= 1964–65 William & Mary Indians men's basketball team =

American college basketball season

1964–65 William & Mary Indians men's basketball
- Conference: Southern Conference
- Record: 12–13 (6–8 SoCon)
- Head coach: Bill Chambers (8th season)
- Home arena: Blow Gymnasium; Norfolk Municipal Auditorium (one game)

1964–65 Southern Conference men's basketball standings
	Conf.				Overall
Team	W		L	PCT	W		L	PCT
No. 6 Davidson	12	–	0	1.000	24	–	2	.923
Virginia Tech	9	–	5	.643	13	–	10	.565
The Citadel	8	–	4	.667	13	–	11	.542
West Virginia †	8	–	6	.571	14	–	15	.483
George Washington	6	–	7	.462	10	–	13	.435
William & Mary	6	–	8	.429	12	–	13	.480
Richmond	6	–	10	.375	10	–	16	.385
VMI	5	–	9	.357	8	–	13	.381
Furman	2	–	13	.133	6	–	19	.240
East Carolina*		–		–	12	–	10	.545
† Tournament winner * – Played as non-major program As of April 30, 1965; Rankings from AP Poll

The 1964–65 William & Mary Indians men's basketball team represented the College of William & Mary in intercollegiate basketball during the 1964–65 NCAA University Division men's basketball season. Under the eighth year of head coach Bill Chambers, the team finished the season 12–13 and 6–8 in the Southern Conference.

William & Mary played most of its home games on campus at Blow Gymnasium, with one home game played off campus at the Norfolk Municipal Auditorium in Norfolk, Virginia. This was the 60th season of the collegiate basketball program at William & Mary, whose nickname is now the Tribe.

The Indians finished in sixth place in the conference and qualified for the 1965 Southern Conference men's basketball tournament, held at the Charlotte Coliseum in Charlotte, North Carolina. William & Mary defeated The Citadel in the first round and VPI in the second round before falling, in double overtime, to fourth-seeded West Virginia in the championship game (67–70).

The Indians did not participate in a post-season tournament.

== Schedule ==
Date time, TV	Rank^{#}	Opponent^{#}	Result	Record	Site city, state
Regular season
December 1*		at Virginia	L 58–72	0–1	Memorial Gymnasium; Charlottesville, VA
December 3*		Hampden–Sydney	W 98–70	1–1	Blow Gymnasium; Williamsburg, VA
December 5*		East Carolina	W 86–72	2–1	Blow Gymnasium; Williamsburg, VA
December 8		George Washington	W 54–44	3–1 (1–0)	Blow Gymnasium; Williamsburg, VA
December 11		Furman	L 64–65 ^{OT}	3–2 (1–1)	Blow Gymnasium; Williamsburg, VA
December 14		at West Virginia	L 63–72	3–1 (2–1)	Stansbury Hall; Morgantown, WV
December 17		VMI	W 66–63	4–1 (3–1)	Blow Gymnasium; Williamsburg, VA
December 21*		at Georgia Tech	L 73–91	4–2	Alexander Memorial Coliseum; Atlanta, GA
December 29*		at Texas Western; Sun Carnival Classic	L 50–56	4–3	Memorial Gymnasium; El Paso, TX
December 30*		vs. Texas Christian; Sun Carnival Classic	L 71–76	4–4	Memorial Gymnasium; El Paso, TX
January 2		vs. Davidson	L 57–77	4–5 (3–2)	Charlotte, NC
January 5		The Citadel	L 64–70	4–6 (3–3)	Blow Gymnasium; Williamsburg, VA
January 9		at George Washington	L 50–56	4–7 (3–4)	Fort Myer Gymnasium; Fort Myer, VA
January 11		VPI	L 75–89	4–8 (3–5)	Blow Gymnasium; Williamsburg, VA
January 16		at Richmond	W 61–59	5–8 (4–5)	Richmond Arena; Richmond, VA
January 30*		vs. East Carolina	W 61–58	6–8	Norfolk Municipal Auditorium; Norfolk, VA
February 1		at Furman	W 68–64	7–8 (5–5)	Greenville Memorial Auditorium; Greenville, SC
February 3		at The Citadel	W 79–70	8–8 (6–5)	McAlister Field House; Charleston, SC
February 10		at VMI	L 57–61	8–9 (6–6)	VMI Field House; Lexington, VA
February 13*		Pittsburgh	W 63–61	9–9	Blow Gymnasium; Williamsburg, VA
February 16		at VPI	L 57–76	9–10 (6–7)	Cassell Coliseum; Blacksburg, VA
February 20		Richmond	W 87–77	10–10 (7–7)	Blow Gymnasium; Williamsburg, VA
1965 Southern Conference Basketball Tournament
February 25		vs. (3) The Citadel; Quarterfinals	W 68–60	11–10	Charlotte Coliseum; Charlotte, NC
February 26		vs. (2) VPI; Semifinals	W 70–59	12–10	Charlotte Coliseum; Charlotte, NC
February 27		vs. (4) West Virginia; Championship	L 67–70 ^{2OT}	12–11	Charlotte Coliseum; Charlotte, NC
*Non-conference game. ^{#}Rankings from AP Poll. (#) Tournament seedings in parentheses.
