= 1961–62 William & Mary Indians men's basketball team =

American college basketball season

1961–62 William & Mary Indians men's basketball
- Conference: Southern Conference
- Record: 7–17 (5–11 SoCon)
- Head coach: Bill Chambers (5th season)
- Home arena: Blow Gymnasium; Norfolk Municipal Auditorium (one game)

1961–62 Southern Conference men's basketball standings
	Conf.				Overall
Team	W		L	PCT	W		L	PCT
West Virginia †	12	–	1	.923	24	–	6	.800
Virginia Tech	9	–	3	.750	19	–	6	.760
Furman	8	–	5	.615	15	–	12	.556
George Washington	6	–	7	.462	9	–	15	.375
Davidson	5	–	6	.455	14	–	11	.560
VMI	6	–	8	.429	9	–	11	.450
The Citadel	4	–	8	.333	8	–	15	.348
Richmond	5	–	11	.313	6	–	21	.222
William & Mary	5	–	11	.313	7	–	17	.292
† Southern Conference Tournament winner Rankings from AP Poll

The 1961–62 William & Mary Indians men's basketball team represented the College of William & Mary in intercollegiate basketball during the 1961–62 NCAA University Division men's basketball season. Under the fifth year of head coach Bill Chambers, the team finished the season 7–17 and 5–11 in the Southern Conference.

William & Mary played its home games on campus at Blow Gymnasium, with one home game played at the Norfolk Municipal Auditorium in Norfolk, Virginia. This was the 57th season of the collegiate basketball program at William & Mary, whose nickname is now the Tribe.

The Indians finished in 8th place in the conference and failed to qualified for the 1962 Southern Conference men's basketball tournament, held at the Richmond Arena. William & Mary did not participate in a post-season tournament.

== Program notes ==
- William & Mary played three teams for the first time this year: Texas Tech, Texas, and Loyola–New Orleans.

== Schedule ==
Date time, TV	Rank^{#}	Opponent^{#}	Result	Record	Site city, state
Regular season
December 2		at West Virginia	L 53–69	0–1 (0–1)	Stansbury Hall; Morgantown, WV
December 5		at The Citadel	L 76–83	0–2 (0–2)	McAlister Field House; Charleston, SC
December 6*		at Georgia Tech	L 56–72	0–3	Alexander Memorial Coliseum; Atlanta, GA
December 9		George Washington	W 86–55	1–3 (1–2)	Blow Gymnasium; Williamsburg, VA
December 12*		Virginia	W 71–63	2–3	Blow Gymnasium; Williamsburg, VA
December 15*		East Carolina	W 81–60	3–3	Blow Gymnasium; Williamsburg, VA
December 28*		at Texas Tech	L 70–91	3–4	Lubbock Municipal Coliseum; Lubbock, TX
December 29*		at Texas	L 71–84	3–5	Lubbock Municipal Coliseum; Lubbock, TX
January 2		at Furman	L 76–77	3–6 (1–3)	Greenville Memorial Auditorium; Greenville, SC
January 3		at Davidson	L 47–62	3–7 (1–4)	Johnston Gym; Davidson, NC
January 6		at Richmond	L 65–73	3–8 (1–5)	Richmond Arena; Richmond, VA
January 11		The Citadel	W 71–58	4–8 (2–5)	Blow Gymnasium; Williamsburg, VA
January 13		VPI	L 49–63	4–9 (2–6)	Blow Gymnasium; Williamsburg, VA
January 16		at VMI	L 71–74	4–10 (2–7)	Cormack Field House; Lexington, VA
January 27		vs. West Virginia	L 61–70	4–11 (2–8)	Norfolk Municipal Auditorium; Norfolk, VA
January 31		Furman	W 79–67	5–11 (3–8)	Blow Gymnasium; Williamsburg, VA
February 3		Davidson	L 54–61	5–12 (3–9)	Blow Gymnasium; Williamsburg, VA
February 6*		at Memphis State	L 63–73	5–13	Memorial Fieldhouse; Memphis, TN
February 7*		at Loyola–New Orleans	L 62–67	5–14	The Field House; New Orleans, LA
February 10*		at Navy	L 59–71	5–15	Dahlgren Hall; Annapolis, MD
February 14		at VPI	L 65–104	5–16 (3–10)	Cassell Coliseum; Blacksburg, VA
February 17		VMI	W 102–84	6–16 (4–10)	Blow Gymnasium; Williamsburg, VA
February 20		at George Washington	L 84–92	6–17 (4–11)	Fort Myer Gymnasium; Fort Myer, VA
February 24		Richmond	W 54–49	7–17 (5–11)	Blow Gymnasium; Williamsburg, VA
*Non-conference game. ^{#}Rankings from AP Poll. (#) Tournament seedings in parentheses.
