= 1960–1969 VMI Keydets basketball =

Virginia Military Institute's sports season

The VMI Keydets basketball teams represented the Virginia Military Institute in Lexington, Virginia. The program began in 1908, and played their games out of Cormack Field House, nicknamed "The Pit". The Keydets were members of the Southern Conference. Their primary rival is The Citadel.

== 1959–60 ==
1959–60 VMI Keydets men's basketball
- Conference: Southern Conference
- Record: 4–16 (3–11 SoCon)
- Head coach: Weenie Miller
- Home arena: Cormack Field House

1959–60 Southern Conference men's basketball standings
	Conf.				Overall
Team	W		L	PCT	W		L	PCT
Virginia Tech	12	–	1	.923	20	–	6	.769
No. 5 West Virginia †	9	–	2	.818	26	–	5	.839
William & Mary	10	–	5	.667	15	–	11	.577
The Citadel	8	–	4	.667	15	–	8	.652
George Washington	7	–	5	.583	15	–	11	.577
Furman	6	–	7	.462	9	–	16	.360
VMI	3	–	11	.214	4	–	16	.200
Richmond	2	–	12	.143	7	–	18	.280
Davidson	0	–	10	.000	5	–	19	.208
† Southern Conference Tournament winner Rankings from AP Poll

Date time, TV	Opponent	Result	Record	Site city, state
December 3 no, no	William & Mary	L 78–79	0–1 (0–1)	Cormack Field House; Lexington, Virginia
December 5* no, no	at Bridgewater	L 68–70	0–2	Nininger Hall; Bridgewater, Virginia
December 8 no, no	George Washington	L 77–90	0–3 (0–2)	Cormack Field House; Lexington, Virginia
December 10* no, no	Hampden–Sydney	W 108–96 ^{3OT}	1–3	Cormack Field House; Lexington, Virginia
December 14 no, no	at West Virginia	L 76–91	1–4 (0–3)	Stansbury Hall; Morgantown, West Virginia
December 18* no, no	at Kentucky Wesleyan; All-America Tournament	L 90–102	1–5	Owensboro, Kentucky
December 19* no, no	vs. Middle Tennessee; All-America Tournament	L 61–74	1–6	Owensboro, Kentucky
January 6* no, no	Virginia	L 71–83	1–7	Cormack Field House; Lexington, Virginia
January 9 no, no	at The Citadel	L 53–74	1–8 (0–4)	The Citadel Armory; Charleston, South Carolina
January 11 no, no	at Davidson	W 70–38	2–8 (1–4)	Johnston Gym; Davidson, North Carolina
January 16 no, no	at Richmond	W 77–76 ^{OT}	3–8 (2–4)	Richmond Arena; Richmond, Virginia
January 19 no, no	Virginia Tech	L 93–95 ^{OT}	3–9 (2–5)	Cormack Field House; Lexington, Virginia
February 1 no, no	at West Virginia	L 71–101	3–10 (2–6)	Stansbury Hall; Morgantown, West Virginia
February 5 no, no	The Citadel	L 45–76	3–11 (2–7)	Cormack Field House; Lexington, Virginia
February 9 no, no	Davidson	W 72–60	4–11 (3–7)	Cormack Field House; Lexington, Virginia
February 11 no, no	at George Washington	L 78–95	4–12 (3–8)	Washington, D.C.
February 12 no, no	at William & Mary	L 67–89	4–13 (3–9)	Blow Gymnasium; Williamsburg, Virginia
February 15 no, no	Richmond	L 58–64	4–14 (3–10)	Cormack Field House; Lexington, Virginia
February 19 no, no	at Virginia Tech	L 71–100	4–15 (3–11)	War Memorial Gymnasium; Blacksburg, Virginia
1960 Southern Conference men's basketball tournament
February 25 no, no	vs. West Virginia	L 83–90	4–16	Richmond Arena; Richmond, Virginia
*Non-conference game. (#) Tournament seedings in parentheses. All times are in Eastern Time.

== 1960–61 ==
1960–61 VMI Keydets men's basketball
- Conference: Southern Conference
- Record: 5–17 (3–11 SoCon)
- Head coach: Weenie Miller
- Home arena: Cormack Field House

1960–61 Southern Conference men's basketball standings
	Conf.				Overall
Team	W		L	PCT	W		L	PCT
No. 9 West Virginia	11	–	1	.917	23	–	4	.852
Virginia Tech	12	–	3	.800	15	–	7	.682
The Citadel	10	–	3	.769	17	–	8	.680
William & Mary	9	–	6	.600	14	–	10	.583
Furman	6	–	7	.462	15	–	11	.577
Richmond	5	–	11	.313	9	–	14	.391
George Washington †	3	–	9	.250	9	–	17	.346
VMI	3	–	11	.214	5	–	17	.227
Davidson	2	–	10	.167	9	–	14	.391
† Southern Conference Tournament winner Rankings from AP Poll

Date time, TV	Opponent	Result	Record	Site city, state
December 1* no, no	at Kentucky	L 56–72	0–1	Memorial Coliseum; Lexington, Kentucky
December 3* no, no	at Pennsylvania	L 80–84	0–2	The Palestra; Philadelphia
December 8 no, no	Davidson	W 72–68	1–2 (1–0)	Cormack Field House; Lexington, Virginia
December 10 no, no	at William & Mary	L 58–66	1–3 (1–1)	Blow Gymnasium; Williamsburg, Virginia
December 13* no, no	at Virginia	W 75–63	2–3	Memorial Gymnasium; Charlottesville, Virginia
December 17 no, no	George Washington	L 86–90	2–4 (1–2)	Cormack Field House; Lexington, Virginia
December 29* no, no	at Richmond; Richmond Invitational	L 90–100	2–5	Richmond Arena; Richmond, Virginia
December 30* no, no	vs. Virginia; Richmond Invitational	L 68–76	2–6	Richmond Arena; Richmond, Virginia
January 5 no, no	at West Virginia	L 72–87	2–7 (1–3)	Stansbury Hall; Morgantown, West Virginia
January 7 no, no	The Citadel	L 69–70	2–8 (1–4)	Cormack Field House; Lexington, Virginia
January 12 no, no	at Virginia Tech	L 63–78	2–9 (1–5)	War Memorial Gymnasium; Blacksburg, Virginia
January 14 no, no	at Richmond	L 62–69	2–10 (1–6)	Richmond Arena; Richmond, Virginia
January 17 no, no	at George Washington	W 93–77	3–10 (2–6)	Washington, D.C.
January 28* no, no	Bucknell	W 101–79	4–10	Cormack Field House; Lexington, Virginia
January 31 no, no	vs. West Virginia	L 91–102	4–11 (2–7)	Bluefield, West Virginia
February 4 no, no	at Davidson	L 79–88	4–12 (2–8)	Johnston Gym; Davidson, North Carolina
February 6 no, no	Virginia Tech	L 85–86	4–13 (2–9)	Cormack Field House; Lexington, Virginia
February 8 no, no	at The Citadel	L 83–91	4–14 (2–10)	The Citadel Armory; Charleston, South Carolina
February 17 no, no	William & Mary	L 77–86	4–15 (2–11)	Cormack Field House; Lexington, Virginia
February 21 no, no	Richmond	W 78–75	5–15 (3–11)	Cormack Field House; Lexington, Virginia
February 25* no, no	at Morris Harvey	L 85–88	5–16	Charleston, West Virginia
1961 Southern Conference men's basketball tournament
March 2 no, no	vs. West Virginia	L 71–89	5–17	Richmond Arena; Richmond, Virginia
*Non-conference game. (#) Tournament seedings in parentheses. All times are in Eastern Time.

== 1961–62 ==
1961–62 VMI Keydets men's basketball
- Conference: Southern Conference
- Record: 9–11 (6–8 SoCon)
- Head coach: Weenie Miller
- Home arena: Cormack Field House

1961–62 Southern Conference men's basketball standings
	Conf.				Overall
Team	W		L	PCT	W		L	PCT
West Virginia †	12	–	1	.923	24	–	6	.800
Virginia Tech	9	–	3	.750	19	–	6	.760
Furman	8	–	5	.615	15	–	12	.556
George Washington	6	–	7	.462	9	–	15	.375
Davidson	5	–	6	.455	14	–	11	.560
VMI	6	–	8	.429	9	–	11	.450
The Citadel	4	–	8	.333	8	–	15	.348
Richmond	5	–	11	.313	6	–	21	.222
William & Mary	5	–	11	.313	7	–	17	.292
† Southern Conference Tournament winner Rankings from AP Poll

Date time, TV	Opponent	Result	Record	Site city, state
December 2* no, no	at Clemson	L 84–87	0–1	Clemson Field House; Clemson, South Carolina
December 5 no, no	at West Virginia	L 56–90	0–2 (0–1)	Stansbury Hall; Morgantown, West Virginia
December 9 no, no	Davidson	W 84–60	1–2 (1–1)	Cormack Field House; Lexington, Virginia
December 14 no, no	at George Washington	L 85–105	1–3 (1–2)	Washington, D.C.
December 29* no, no	vs. George Washington; Richmond Invitational	W 75–67	2–3	Richmond Arena; Richmond, Virginia
December 30* no, no	vs. Georgetown; Richmond Invitational	L 59–67	2–4	Richmond Arena; Richmond, Virginia
January 3 no, no	at West Virginia	L 79–101	2–5 (1–3)	Stansbury Hall; Morgantown, West Virginia
January 6 no, no	Virginia Tech	L 75–97	2–6 (1–4)	Cormack Field House; Lexington, Virginia
January 10 no, no	The Citadel	W 71–69 ^{OT}	3–6 (2–4)	Cormack Field House; Lexington, Virginia
January 13 no, no	at Richmond	L 52–72	3–7 (2–5)	Richmond Arena; Richmond, Virginia
January 16 no, no	William & Mary	W 74–71	4–7 (3–5)	Cormack Field House; Lexington, Virginia
January 31 no, no	George Washington	W 80–72	5–7 (4–5)	Cormack Field House; Lexington, Virginia
February 3 no, no	at The Citadel	W 73–70	6–7 (5–5)	The Citadel Armory; Charleston, South Carolina
February 7 no, no	Richmond	L 81–82 ^{OT}	6–8 (5–6)	Cormack Field House; Lexington, Virginia
February 10 no, no	at Davidson	W 68–66	7–8 (6–6)	Johnston Gym; Davidson, North Carolina
February 14 no, no	at Virginia Tech	L 71–85	7–9 (6–7)	Cassell Coliseum; Blacksburg, Virginia
February 17 no, no	at William & Mary	L 84–102	7–10 (6–8)	Blow Gymnasium; Williamsburg, Virginia
February 24* no, no	at Marshall	W 76–65	8–10	Veterans Memorial Fieldhouse; Huntington, West Virginia
1962 Southern Conference men's basketball tournament
March 1 no, no	vs. Furman	W 76–61	9–10	Richmond Arena; Richmond, Virginia
March 2 no, no	vs. Virginia Tech	L 66–70	9–11	Richmond Arena; Richmond, Virginia
*Non-conference game. (#) Tournament seedings in parentheses. All times are in Eastern Time.

== 1962–63 ==
1962–63 VMI Keydets men's basketball
- Conference: Southern Conference
- Record: 6–15 (6–10 SoCon)
- Head coach: Weenie Miller
- Home arena: Cormack Field House

1962–63 Southern Conference men's basketball standings
	Conf.				Overall
Team	W		L	PCT	W		L	PCT
West Virginia †	11	–	2	.846	23	–	8	.742
Davidson	8	–	3	.727	20	–	7	.741
William & Mary	10	–	5	.667	15	–	9	.625
Furman	9	–	6	.600	14	–	14	.500
George Washington	6	–	6	.500	8	–	15	.348
Virginia Tech	6	–	6	.500	12	–	12	.500
VMI	6	–	10	.375	6	–	15	.286
Richmond	3	–	13	.188	7	–	18	.280
The Citadel	2	–	10	.167	3	–	20	.130
† Southern Conference Tournament winner Rankings from AP Poll

Date time, TV	Opponent	Result	Record	Site city, state
December 1* no, no	East Carolina	L 66–76	0–1	Cormack Field House; Lexington, Virginia
December 4* no, no	vs. West Virginia	L 74–100	0–2 (0–1)	Charleston, West Virginia
December 8 no, no	at Davidson	L 62–64	0–3 (0–2)	Johnston Gym; Davidson, North Carolina
December 11 no, no	George Washington	W 74–73	1–3 (1–2)	Cormack Field House; Lexington, Virginia
December 15 no, no	Furman	W 88–68	2–3 (2–2)	Cormack Field House; Lexington, Virginia
January 3 no, no	at West Virginia	L 74–86	2–4 (2–3)	Stansbury Hall; Morgantown, West Virginia
January 5 no, no	The Citadel	W 106–71	3–4 (3–3)	Cormack Field House; Lexington, Virginia
January 8 no, no	at Virginia Tech	L 70–74	3–5 (3–4)	Cassell Coliseum; Blacksburg, Virginia
January 11 no, no	Richmond	W 79–77	4–5 (4–4)	Cormack Field House; Lexington, Virginia
January 15 no, no	at William & Mary	L 71–80	4–6 (4–5)	Blow Gymnasium; Williamsburg, Virginia
January 26* no, no	at Marshall	L 82–98	4–7	Veterans Memorial Fieldhouse; Huntington, West Virginia
January 28* no, no	Clemson	L 58–68	4–8	Cormack Field House; Lexington, Virginia
February 1 no, no	Virginia Tech	L 66–77	4–9 (4–6)	Cormack Field House; Lexington, Virginia
February 5 no, no	at George Washington	L 69–81	4–10 (4–7)	Washington, D.C.
February 8 no, no	Davidson	L 57–64	4–11 (4–8)	Cormack Field House; Lexington, Virginia
February 11 no, no	at Furman	L 85–91	4–12 (4–9)	Greenville Memorial Auditorium; Greenville, South Carolina
February 12 no, no	at The Citadel	W 70–65 ^{OT}	5–12 (5–9)	The Citadel Armory; Charleston, South Carolina
February 15 no, no	William & Mary	L 65–75	5–13 (5–10)	Cormack Field House; Lexington, Virginia
February 20 no, no	at Richmond	W 85–60	6–13 (6–10)	Richmond Arena; Richmond, Virginia
February 23* no, no	at NC State	L 72–88	6–14	Reynolds Coliseum; Raleigh, North Carolina
1963 Southern Conference men's basketball tournament
February 28 no, no	vs. Davidson	L 69–108	6–15	Richmond Arena; Richmond, Virginia
*Non-conference game. (#) Tournament seedings in parentheses. All times are in Eastern Time.

== 1963–64 ==
1963–64 VMI Keydets men's basketball

Southern Conference tournament champions

1964 NCAA tournament, First round
- Conference: Southern Conference
- Record: 12–12 (7–7 SoCon)
- Head coach: Weenie Miller
- Home arena: Cormack Field House

1963–64 Southern Conference men's basketball standings
	Conf.				Overall
Team	W		L	PCT	W		L	PCT
No. 10 Davidson	9	–	2	.818	22	–	4	.846
West Virginia	11	–	3	.786	18	–	10	.643
Virginia Tech	7	–	3	.700	16	–	7	.696
VMI †	7	–	7	.500	12	–	12	.500
Furman	7	–	8	.467	11	–	15	.423
George Washington	5	–	7	.417	11	–	15	.423
William & Mary	5	–	9	.357	9	–	13	.409
The Citadel	4	–	8	.333	11	–	10	.524
Richmond	4	–	12	.250	6	–	16	.273
† Southern Conference Tournament winner Rankings from AP Poll

Date time, TV	Opponent	Result	Record	Site city, state
November 30* no, no	at NC State	L 57–69	0–1	Reynolds Coliseum; Raleigh, North Carolina
December 2* no, no	at Tennessee	L 59–71	0–2	Stokely Athletic Center; Knoxville, Tennessee
December 6 no, no	William & Mary	L 51–56	0–3 (0–1)	Cormack Field House; Lexington, Virginia
December 10 no, no	at George Washington	W 80–75	1–3 (1–1)	Washington, D.C.
December 13 no, no	at West Virginia	W 68–64	2–3 (2–1)	Stansbury Hall; Morgantown, West Virginia
December 15 no, no	Furman	W 64–51	3–3 (3–1)	Cormack Field House; Lexington, Virginia
December 20* no, no	at Clemson	L 80–100	3–4	Clemson Field House; Clemson, South Carolina
December 31* no, no	at Vanderbilt	L 71–87	3–5	Memorial Gymnasium; Nashville, Tennessee
January 4* no, no	Florida State	W 83–72	4–5	Cormack Field House; Lexington, Virginia
January 7 no, no	Davidson	L 58–70	4–6 (3–2)	Cormack Field House; Lexington, Virginia
January 9 no, no	at West Virginia	L 73–75	4–7 (3–3)	Stansbury Hall; Morgantown, West Virginia
January 28* no, no	East Carolina	W 86–78	5–7	Cormack Field House; Lexington, Virginia
February 1 no, no	at Davidson	L 91–129	5–8 (3–4)	Johnston Gym; Davidson, North Carolina
February 4 no, no	George Washington	W 94–75	6–8 (4–4)	Cormack Field House; Lexington, Virginia
February 8 no, no	at Richmond	L 90–96	6–9 (4–5)	Richmond Arena; Richmond, Virginia
February 11 no, no	The Citadel	W 89–88	7–9 (5–5)	Cormack Field House; Lexington, Virginia
February 15 no, no	at William & Mary	W 70–65	8–9 (6–5)	Blow Gymnasium; Williamsburg, Virginia
February 18 no, no	Richmond	W 98–83	9–9 (7–5)	Cormack Field House; Lexington, Virginia
February 21 no, no	at The Citadel	L 77–79	9–10 (7–6)	The Citadel Armory; Charleston, South Carolina
February 22 no, no	at Furman	L 64–70	9–11 (7–7)	Greenville Memorial Auditorium; Greenville, South Carolina
1964 Southern Conference men's basketball tournament
February 27 no, no	vs. Furman	W 77–73	10–11	Charlotte Coliseum; Charlotte, North Carolina
February 28 no, no	vs. Davidson	W 82–81	11–11	Charlotte Coliseum; Charlotte, North Carolina
March 1 no, no	vs. George Washington	W 61–56	12–11	Charlotte Coliseum; Charlotte, North Carolina
1964 NCAA Division I men's basketball tournament
March 9* no, no	vs. Princeton; First Round	L 60–86	12–12	The Palestra; Philadelphia
*Non-conference game. (#) Tournament seedings in parentheses. All times are in Eastern Time.

== 1964–65 ==
1964–65 VMI Keydets men's basketball
- Conference: Southern Conference
- Record: 8–13 (5–9 SoCon)
- Head coach: Gary McPherson
- Home arena: Cormack Field House

1964–65 Southern Conference men's basketball standings
	Conf.				Overall
Team	W		L	PCT	W		L	PCT
No. 6 Davidson	12	–	0	1.000	24	–	2	.923
Virginia Tech	9	–	5	.643	13	–	10	.565
The Citadel	8	–	4	.667	13	–	11	.542
West Virginia †	8	–	6	.571	14	–	15	.483
George Washington	6	–	7	.462	10	–	13	.435
William & Mary	6	–	8	.429	12	–	13	.480
Richmond	6	–	10	.375	10	–	16	.385
VMI	5	–	9	.357	8	–	13	.381
Furman	2	–	13	.133	6	–	19	.240
East Carolina*		–		–	12	–	10	.545
† Tournament winner * – Played as non-major program As of April 30, 1965; Rankings from AP Poll

Date time, TV	Opponent	Result	Record	Site city, state
December 2* no, no	at Florida	L 59–68	0–1	Florida Gymnasium; Gainesville, Florida
December 3* no, no	at Florida State	L 72–76	0–2	Tully Gymnasium; Tallahassee, Florida
December 9* no, no	Virginia	W 95–75	1–2	Cormack Field House; Lexington, Virginia
December 11 no, no	vs. West Virginia	L 73–79	1–3 (0–1)	Charleston, West Virginia
December 15 no, no	at Davidson	L 69–91	1–4 (0–2)	Johnston Gym; Davidson, North Carolina
December 17 no, no	at William & Mary	L 63–66	1–5 (0–3)	Blow Gymnasium; Williamsburg, Virginia
December 29* no, no	at Centenary; Gulf South Classic	W 91–86	2–5	Shreveport, Louisiana
December 30* no, no	vs. Arkansas; Gulf South Classic	W 72–70	3–5	Shreveport, Louisiana
January 2 no, no	at George Washington	L 62–70	3–6 (0–4)	Washington, D.C.
January 4 no, no	The Citadel	W 71–70	4–6 (1–4)	Cormack Field House; Lexington, Virginia
January 6 no, no	at West Virginia	L 79–87	4–7 (1–5)	Stansbury Hall; Morgantown, West Virginia
January 12 no, no	at Richmond	L 65–71	4–8 (1–6)	Richmond Arena; Richmond, Virginia
January 18* no, no	at Georgia Tech	L 71–82	4–9	Alexander Memorial Coliseum; Atlanta
January 30 no, no	at Furman	W 98–83	5–9 (2–6)	Greenville Memorial Auditorium; Greenville, South Carolina
February 2 no, no	Davidson	L 78–84	5–10 (2–7)	Cormack Field House; Lexington, Virginia
February 5 no, no	at The Citadel	L 72–84	5–11 (2–8)	The Citadel Armory; Charleston, South Carolina
February 6 no, no	at Furman	W 69–67	6–11 (3–8)	Greenville Memorial Auditorium; Greenville, South Carolina
February 10 no, no	William & Mary	W 61–57	7–11 (4–8)	Cormack Field House; Lexington, Virginia
February 16 no, no	Richmond	L 80–81	7–12 (4–9)	Cormack Field House; Lexington, Virginia
February 18 no, no	George Washington	W 87–79	8–12 (5–9)	Cormack Field House; Lexington, Virginia
1965 Southern Conference men's basketball tournament
February 25 no, no	vs. Davidson	L 73–86	8–13	Charlotte Coliseum; Charlotte, North Carolina
*Non-conference game. (#) Tournament seedings in parentheses. All times are in Eastern Time.

== 1965–66 ==
1965–66 VMI Keydets men's basketball
- Conference: Southern Conference
- Record: 5–18 (5–11 SoCon)
- Head coach: Gary McPherson
- Home arena: Cormack Field House

1965–66 Southern Conference men's basketball standings
	Conf.				Overall
Team	W		L	PCT	W		L	PCT
Davidson †	11	–	1	.917	21	–	7	.750
West Virginia	8	–	2	.800	19	–	9	.679
William & Mary	8	–	3	.727	13	–	12	.520
Richmond	9	–	7	.563	12	–	13	.480
East Carolina	5	–	7	.417	11	–	15	.423
Furman	4	–	8	.333	9	–	17	.346
VMI	5	–	11	.313	5	–	18	.217
The Citadel	4	–	9	.308	7	–	16	.304
George Washington	3	–	9	.250	3	–	18	.143
† Southern Conference Tournament winner Rankings from AP Poll

Date time, TV	Opponent	Result	Record	Site city, state
December 1 no, no	vs. West Virginia	L 58–69	0–1 (0–1)	Charleston, West Virginia
December 4 no, no	Richmond	L 73–77	0–2 (0–2)	Cormack Field House; Lexington, Virginia
December 8 no, no	at West Virginia	L 75–93	0–3 (0–3)	Stansbury Hall; Morgantown, West Virginia
December 14 no, no	Davidson	L 64–67	0–4 (0–4)	Cormack Field House; Lexington, Virginia
December 17* no, no	at Centenary; Gulf South Classic	L 77–78	0–5	Shreveport, Louisiana
December 18* no, no	vs. LSU; Gulf South Classic	L 70–73	0–6	Shreveport, Louisiana
December 20* no, no	vs. Florida State; Tampa Invitational	L 64–65	0–7	Tampa, Florida
December 21* no, no	vs. Columbia; Tampa Invitational	L 73–80	0–8	Tampa, Florida
January 3 no, no	at George Washington	W 97–74	1–8 (1–4)	Washington, D.C.
January 8 no, no	William & Mary	W 89–74	2–8 (2–4)	Cormack Field House; Lexington, Virginia
January 10 no, no	Furman	W 90–83	3–8 (3–4)	Cormack Field House; Lexington, Virginia
January 13 no, no	at Richmond	L 88–103	3–9 (3–5)	Richmond Arena; Richmond, Virginia
January 15* no, no	at Georgia Tech	L 73–86	3–10	Alexander Memorial Coliseum; Atlanta
January 17 no, no	at East Carolina	L 85–87	3–11 (3–6)	Minges Coliseum; Greenville, North Carolina
January 29 no, no	East Carolina	L 80–93	3–12 (3–7)	Cormack Field House; Lexington, Virginia
February 1 no, no	at Davidson	L 84–97	3–13 (3–8)	Johnston Gym; Davidson, North Carolina
February 5 no, no	George Washington	W 109–92	4–13 (4–8)	Cormack Field House; Lexington, Virginia
February 8 no, no	The Citadel	W 80–77	5–13 (5–8)	Cormack Field House; Lexington, Virginia
February 12 no, no	at William & Mary	L 67–94	5–14 (5–9)	Blow Gymnasium; Williamsburg, Virginia
February 14 no, no	at The Citadel	L 69–71	5–15 (5–10)	The Citadel Armory; Charleston, South Carolina
February 15 no, no	at Furman	L 72–73	5–16 (5–11)	Greenville Memorial Auditorium; Greenville, South Carolina
February 19* no, no	at Virginia	L 65–79	5–17	University Hall; Charlottesville, Virginia
1966 Southern Conference men's basketball tournament
February 24 no, no	vs. West Virginia	L 80–95	5–18	Charlotte Coliseum; Charlotte, North Carolina
*Non-conference game. (#) Tournament seedings in parentheses. All times are in Eastern Time.

== 1966–67 ==
1966–67 VMI Keydets men's basketball
- Conference: Southern Conference
- Record: 5–16 (4–12 SoCon)
- Head coach: Gary McPherson
- Home arena: Cormack Field House

1966–67 Southern Conference men's basketball standings
	Conf.				Overall
Team	W		L	PCT	W		L	PCT
West Virginia †	9	–	1	.900	19	–	9	.679
Davidson	8	–	4	.667	15	–	12	.556
William & Mary	8	–	5	.615	14	–	11	.560
Richmond	9	–	7	.563	11	–	12	.478
The Citadel	6	–	7	.462	8	–	16	.333
George Washington	5	–	7	.417	6	–	18	.250
Furman	4	–	6	.400	9	–	15	.375
East Carolina	4	–	8	.333	7	–	17	.292
VMI	4	–	12	.250	5	–	16	.238
† Southern Conference Tournament winner Rankings from AP Poll

Date time, TV	Opponent	Result	Record	Site city, state
December 1* no, no	at NC State	L 58–67	0–1	Reynolds Coliseum; Raleigh, North Carolina
December 3 no, no	Richmond	L 74–76	0–2 (0–1)	Cormack Field House; Lexington, Virginia
December 7 no, no	at West Virginia	L 75–99	0–3 (0–2)	Stansbury Hall; Morgantown, West Virginia
December 10 no, no	Furman	W 105–96	1–3 (1–2)	Cormack Field House; Lexington, Virginia
December 13 no, no	Davidson	L 80–82	1–4 (1–3)	Cormack Field House; Lexington, Virginia
December 20 no, no	at Richmond	L 65–89	1–5 (1–4)	Richmond Arena; Richmond, Virginia
December 28* no, no	at Arkansas State; Arkansas State Invitational	L 71–81	1–6	Jonesboro, Arkansas
December 29* no, no	vs. Kent State; Arkansas State Invitational	W 66–63 ^{OT}	2–6	Jonesboro, Arkansas
January 7 no, no	at East Carolina	L 72–79	2–7 (1–5)	Minges Coliseum; Greenville, North Carolina
January 11 no, no	George Washington	L 62–65	2–8 (1–6)	Cormack Field House; Lexington, Virginia
January 14* no, no	Wake Forest	L 70–71	2–9	Cormack Field House; Lexington, Virginia
January 16 no, no	vs. West Virginia	L 77–91	2–10 (1–7)	Charleston, West Virginia
January 28 no, no	East Carolina	W 68–67	3–10 (2–7)	Cormack Field House; Lexington, Virginia
January 30 no, no	vs. George Washington	L 66–71	3–11 (2–8)	Fort Myer, Virginia
February 3 no, no	The Citadel	L 70–73	3–12 (2–9)	Cormack Field House; Lexington, Virginia
February 7 no, no	at William & Mary	L 57–64	3–13 (2–10)	Blow Gymnasium; Williamsburg, Virginia
February 11 no, no	at Furman	W 71–57	4–13 (3–10)	Greenville Memorial Auditorium; Greenville, South Carolina
February 13 no, no	at The Citadel	L 78–81 ^{OT}	4–14 (3–11)	The Citadel Armory; Charleston, South Carolina
February 17 no, no	William & Mary	W 81–67	5–14 (4–11)	Cormack Field House; Lexington, Virginia
February 21 no, no	at Davidson	L 69–73	5–15 (4–12)	Johnston Gym; Davidson, North Carolina
February 24* no, no	Samford	L 71–81	5–16	Cormack Field House; Lexington, Virginia
*Non-conference game. (#) Tournament seedings in parentheses. All times are in Eastern Time.

== 1967–68 ==
1967–68 VMI Keydets men's basketball
- Conference: Southern Conference
- Record: 9–12 (8–7 SoCon)
- Head coach: Gary McPherson
- Home arena: Cormack Field House

1967–68 Southern Conference men's basketball standings
	Conf.				Overall
Team	W		L	PCT	W		L	PCT
No. 8 Davidson †	9	–	1	.900	24	–	5	.828
West Virginia	9	–	2	.818	19	–	9	.679
The Citadel	6	–	5	.545	11	–	14	.440
VMI	8	–	7	.533	9	–	12	.429
Furman	6	–	6	.500	13	–	14	.481
Richmond	8	–	8	.500	12	–	13	.480
East Carolina	6	–	7	.462	9	–	16	.360
William & Mary	4	–	10	.286	6	–	18	.250
George Washington	2	–	12	.143	5	–	19	.208
† 1968 Southern Conference tournament winner Rankings from AP Poll

Date time, TV	Opponent	Result	Record	Site city, state
December 2 no, no	at Davidson	L 73–80	0–1 (0–1)	Johnston Gym; Davidson, North Carolina
December 4* no, no	at Samford	L 79–80	0–2	Seibert Hall; Homewood, Alabama
December 7* no, no	Virginia	L 79–84	0–3	Cormack Field House; Lexington, Virginia
December 11 no, no	Furman	W 83–80	1–3 (1–1)	Cormack Field House; Lexington, Virginia
December 16* no, no	Old Dominion	W 96–88	2–3	Cormack Field House; Lexington, Virginia
December 20 no, no	at William & Mary	L 82–96	2–4 (1–2)	Blow Gymnasium; Williamsburg, Virginia
December 22 no, no	at West Virginia	L 57–77	2–5 (1–3)	Stansbury Hall; Morgantown, West Virginia
January 3 no, no	vs. West Virginia	W 92–90	3–5 (2–3)	Beckley, West Virginia
January 6* no, no	at Wake Forest	L 60–92	3–6	Winston-Salem Memorial Coliseum; Winston-Salem, North Carolina
January 9 no, no	Richmond	W 91–85	4–6 (3–3)	Cormack Field House; Lexington, Virginia
January 27 no, no	George Washington	W 70–58	5–6 (4–3)	Cormack Field House; Lexington, Virginia
January 30* no, no	at Georgia Tech	L 70–90	5–7	Alexander Memorial Coliseum; Atlanta
February 2 no, no	The Citadel	W 81–67	6–7 (5–3)	Cormack Field House; Lexington, Virginia
February 5 no, no	William & Mary	W 68–62	7–7 (6–3)	Cormack Field House; Lexington, Virginia
February 7 no, no	vs. George Washington	L 59–60	7–8 (6–4)	Fort Myer, Virginia
February 10 no, no	at Furman	L 73–76	7–9 (6–5)	Greenville Memorial Auditorium; Greenville, South Carolina
February 12 no, no	at The Citadel	W 87–77	8–9 (7–5)	The Citadel Armory; Charleston, South Carolina
February 15 no, no	East Carolina	W 69–64	9–9 (8–5)	Cormack Field House; Lexington, Virginia
February 17 no, no	at Richmond	L 76–86	9–10 (8–6)	Richmond Arena; Richmond, Virginia
February 24 no, no	at East Carolina	L 68–79	9–11 (8–7)	Minges Coliseum; Greenville, North Carolina
1968 Southern Conference men's basketball tournament
February 29 no, no	vs. Furman	L 52–62	9–12	Charlotte Coliseum; Charlotte, North Carolina
*Non-conference game. (#) Tournament seedings in parentheses. All times are in Eastern Time.

== 1968–69 ==
1968–69 VMI Keydets men's basketball
- Conference: Southern Conference
- Record: 5–18 (3–11 SoCon)
- Head coach: Gary McPherson
- Home arena: Cormack Field House

1968–69 Southern Conference men's basketball standings
	Conf.				Overall
Team	W		L	PCT	W		L	PCT
No. 5 Davidson †	9	–	0	1.000	27	–	3	.900
East Carolina	9	–	2	.818	17	–	11	.607
George Washington	7	–	5	.583	14	–	11	.560
Richmond	6	–	7	.462	13	–	14	.481
Furman	5	–	6	.455	9	–	17	.346
The Citadel	5	–	8	.385	13	–	12	.520
William & Mary	3	–	8	.273	6	–	20	.231
VMI	3	–	11	.214	5	–	18	.217
† 1969 Southern Conference tournament winner Rankings from AP Poll

Date time, TV	Opponent	Result	Record	Site city, state
November 30 no, no	at Davidson	L 72–82	0–1 (0–1)	Johnston Gym; Davidson, North Carolina
December 2 no, no	at The Citadel	L 70–88	0–2 (0–2)	The Citadel Armory; Charleston, South Carolina
December 5 no, no	Furman	W 83–55	1–2 (1–2)	Cormack Field House; Lexington, Virginia
December 10 no, no	at George Washington	L 72–83	1–3 (1–3)	Washington, D.C.
December 19* no, no	vs. Richmond; Big 5 Tournament	L 80–90	1–4	Salem, Virginia
December 27* no, no	at Utah; Utah Classic	L 75–83	1–5	Nielsen Fieldhouse; Salt Lake City, Utah
December 28* no, no	vs. Rutgers; Utah Classic	L 72–79	1–6	Nielsen Fieldhouse; Salt Lake City, Utah
December 30* no, no	at Indiana State	L 53–73	1–7	College Arena; Terre Haute, Indiana
January 8* no, no	vs. West Virginia	L 65–68	1–8	Beckley, West Virginia
January 11 no, no	Richmond	L 74–89	1–9 (1–4)	Cormack Field House; Lexington, Virginia
January 15* no, no	at West Virginia	W 87–84	2–9	Stansbury Hall; Morgantown, West Virginia
January 18 no, no	Davidson	L 64–66	2–10 (1–5)	Cormack Field House; Lexington, Virginia
January 20 no, no	East Carolina	L 75–83	2–11 (1–6)	Cormack Field House; Lexington, Virginia
January 25 no, no	at Furman	L 68–71	2–12 (1–7)	Greenville Memorial Auditorium; Greenville, South Carolina
January 27* no, no	Old Dominion	W 99–93	3–12	Cormack Field House; Lexington, Virginia
January 30 no, no	William & Mary	W 72–71	4–12 (2–7)	Cormack Field House; Lexington, Virginia
February 5* no, no	vs. Georgia Tech	L 74–87	4–13	Salem, Virginia
February 8 no, no	at Richmond	L 88–104	4–14 (2–8)	Richmond Arena; Richmond, Virginia
February 10 no, no	The Citadel	L 77–79	4–15 (2–9)	Cormack Field House; Lexington, Virginia
February 15 no, no	at William & Mary	L 78–83	4–16 (2–10)	Blow Gymnasium; Williamsburg, Virginia
February 18 no, no	George Washington	W 90–86	5–16 (3–10)	Cormack Field House; Lexington, Virginia
February 22 no, no	at East Carolina	L 62–78	5–17 (3–11)	Minges Coliseum; Greenville, North Carolina
1969 Southern Conference men's basketball tournament
February 27 no, no	vs. Davidson	L 75–99	5–18	Charlotte Coliseum; Charlotte, North Carolina
*Non-conference game. (#) Tournament seedings in parentheses. All times are in Eastern Time.
