= The Citadel Bulldogs basketball, 1960–1969 =

The Citadel Bulldogs basketball teams represented The Citadel, The Military College of South Carolina in Charleston, South Carolina, United States. The program was established in 1900–01, and has continuously fielded a team since 1912–13. Their primary rivals are College of Charleston, Furman and VMI.

== 1959–60 ==
1959–60 The Citadel Bulldogs men's basketball
- Conference: Southern Conference
- Record: 15–8 (8–4 SoCon)
- Head coach: Norm Sloan
- Home arena: The Citadel Armory

1959–60 Southern Conference men's basketball standings
	Conf.				Overall
Team	W		L	PCT	W		L	PCT
Virginia Tech	12	–	1	.923	20	–	6	.769
No. 5 West Virginia †	9	–	2	.818	26	–	5	.839
William & Mary	10	–	5	.667	15	–	11	.577
The Citadel	8	–	4	.667	15	–	8	.652
George Washington	7	–	5	.583	15	–	11	.577
Furman	6	–	7	.462	9	–	16	.360
VMI	3	–	11	.214	4	–	16	.200
Richmond	2	–	12	.143	7	–	18	.280
Davidson	0	–	10	.000	5	–	19	.208
† Southern Conference Tournament winner Rankings from AP Poll

Date time, TV	Opponent	Result	Record	Site city, state
December 1*	Presbyterian	W 93–40	1–0	The Citadel Armory; Charleston, South Carolina
December 4	West Virginia	L 76–98	1–1 (0–1)	The Citadel Armory; Charleston, South Carolina
December 7*	Alabama	W 68–60	2–1	The Citadel Armory; Charleston, South Carolina
December 11	George Washington	W 75–58	3–1 (1–1)	The Citadel Armory; Charleston, South Carolina
December 12	at Richmond	L 52–63	3–2 (1–2)	Richmond Arena; Richmond, Virginia
December 16*	Morris Harvey	W 89–68	4–2	The Citadel Armory; Charleston, South Carolina
December 19*	at Dayton	L 48–60	4–3	University of Dayton Fieldhouse; Dayton, Ohio
December 21*	vs. Xavier	L 91–94	4–4	Allen County War Memorial Coliseum; Fort Wayne, Indiana
January 1*	vs. Bucknell	W 95–73	5–4	Greenville Memorial Auditorium; Greenville, South Carolina
January 2	at Furman	W 77–73	6–4	Greenville Memorial Auditorium; Greenville, South Carolina
January 5*	at Florida State	W 76–74 ^{OT}	7–4	Tully Gymnasium; Tallahassee, Florida
January 9	VMI	W 74–53	8–4 (2–2)	The Citadel Armory; Charleston, South Carolina
January 29*	at No. 1 Cincinnati	L 43–64	8–5	Armory Fieldhouse; Cincinnati, Ohio
February 1	Richmond	W 85–55	9–5 (3–2)	The Citadel Armory; Charleston, South Carolina
February 3	at William & Mary	L 65–79	9–6 (3–3)	Blow Gymnasium; Williamsburg, Virginia
February 5	at VMI	W 76–45	10–6 (4–3)	Cormack Field House; Lexington, Virginia
February 8	Furman	W 84–81	11–6 (5–3)	The Citadel Armory; Charleston, South Carolina
February 11	Furman	W 59–55	12–6 (6–3)	The Citadel Armory; Charleston, South Carolina
February 12	Virginia Tech	L 74–86	12–7 (6–4)	The Citadel Armory; Charleston, South Carolina
February 15*	Florida State	W 100–60	13–7	The Citadel Armory; Charleston, South Carolina
February 16	at Davidson	W 73–55	14–7 (7–4)	Johnston Gym; Davidson, North Carolina
February 20	Davidson	W 92–65	15–7 (8–4)	The Citadel Armory; Charleston, South Carolina
1960 Southern Conference men's basketball tournament
February 25	vs. George Washington	L 60–74	15–8	Richmond Arena; Richmond, Virginia
*Non-conference game. (#) Tournament seedings in parentheses. All times are in Eastern Time.

== 1960–61 ==
1960–61 The Citadel Bulldogs men's basketball
- Conference: Southern Conference
- Record: 17–8 (10–4 SoCon)
- Head coach: Mel Thompson
- Home arena: The Citadel Armory

1960–61 Southern Conference men's basketball standings
	Conf.				Overall
Team	W		L	PCT	W		L	PCT
No. 9 West Virginia	11	–	1	.917	23	–	4	.852
Virginia Tech	12	–	3	.800	15	–	7	.682
The Citadel	10	–	3	.769	17	–	8	.680
William & Mary	9	–	6	.600	14	–	10	.583
Furman	6	–	7	.462	15	–	11	.577
Richmond	5	–	11	.313	9	–	14	.391
George Washington †	3	–	9	.250	9	–	17	.346
VMI	3	–	11	.214	5	–	17	.227
Davidson	2	–	10	.167	9	–	14	.391
† Southern Conference Tournament winner Rankings from AP Poll

Date time, TV	Opponent	Result	Record	Site city, state
December 1*	East Carolina	W 99–83	1–0	The Citadel Armory; Charleston, South Carolina
December 3	at Richmond	W 92–78	2–0 (1–0)	Richmond Arena; Richmond, Virginia
December 6	at West Virginia	W 83–80	3–0 (2–0)	WVU Field House; Morgantown, West Virginia
December 10*	at NC State	L 71–88	3–1	Reynolds Coliseum; Raleigh, North Carolina
December 15*	at Loyola	W 88–78	4–1	New Orleans
December 17*	at Clemson	L 68–78	4–2	Clemson Field House; Clemson, South Carolina
December 19*	at Georgia	W 82–72	5–2	Woodruff Hall; Athens, Georgia
December 20*	at Georgia Southern	W 90–84	6–2	Statesboro, Georgia
December 29*	vs. BYU; Poinsettia Classic	W 94–83	7–2	Greenville Memorial Auditorium; Greenville, South Carolina
December 30	at Furman; Poinsettia Classic	L 56–62 ^{OT}	7–3 (2–1)	Greenville Memorial Auditorium; Greenville, South Carolina
January 3	at Virginia Tech	L 63–73	7–4 (2–2)	War Memorial Gymnasium; Blacksburg, Virginia
January 7	at VMI	W 70–69	8–4 (3–2)	Cormack Field House; Lexington, Virginia
January 10	William & Mary	W 64–63 ^{OT}	9–4 (4–2)	The Citadel Armory; Charleston, South Carolina
January 14	at Davidson	W 74–73	10–4 (5–2)	Johnston Gym; Davidson, North Carolina
January 16	at Furman	L 84–92	10–5 (5–3)	Greenville Memorial Auditorium; Greenville, South Carolina
January 27	Richmond	W 89–80	11–5 (6–3)	The Citadel Armory; Charleston, South Carolina
January 31	at Virginia Tech	L 93–116	11–6 (6–4)	War Memorial Gymnasium; Blacksburg, Virginia
February 3	George Washington	W 89–72	12–6 (7–4)	The Citadel Armory; Charleston, South Carolina
February 6*	at Florida State	L 77–83	12–7	Tully Gymnasium; Tallahassee, Florida
February 11	Furman	W 78–66	13–7 (8–4)	The Citadel Armory; Charleston, South Carolina
February 13	VMI	W 91–83	14–7 (9–4)	The Citadel Armory; Charleston, South Carolina
February 18	Florida State	W 79–66	15–7	The Citadel Armory; Charleston, South Carolina
February 25	Davidson	W 88–66	16–7 (10–4)	The Citadel Armory; Charleston, South Carolina
1961 Southern Conference men's basketball tournament
March 2	at Richmond	W 70–66	17–7	Richmond Arena; Richmond, Virginia
March 3	vs. George Washington	L 87–94	17–8	Richmond Arena; Richmond, Virginia
*Non-conference game. (#) Tournament seedings in parentheses. All times are in Eastern Time.

== 1961–62 ==
1961–62 The Citadel Bulldogs men's basketball
- Conference: Southern Conference
- Record: 8–15 (4–8 SoCon)
- Head coach: Mel Thompson
- Home arena: The Citadel Armory

1961–62 Southern Conference men's basketball standings
	Conf.				Overall
Team	W		L	PCT	W		L	PCT
West Virginia †	12	–	1	.923	24	–	6	.800
Virginia Tech	9	–	3	.750	19	–	6	.760
Furman	8	–	5	.615	15	–	12	.556
George Washington	6	–	7	.462	9	–	15	.375
Davidson	5	–	6	.455	14	–	11	.560
VMI	6	–	8	.429	9	–	11	.450
The Citadel	4	–	8	.333	8	–	15	.348
Richmond	5	–	11	.313	6	–	21	.222
William & Mary	5	–	11	.313	7	–	17	.292
† Southern Conference Tournament winner Rankings from AP Poll

Date time, TV	Opponent	Result	Record	Site city, state
December 2*	East Carolina	W 85–73	1–0	The Citadel Armory; Charleston, South Carolina
December 5	William & Mary	W 83–76	2–0 (1–0)	The Citadel Armory; Charleston, South Carolina
December 8	West Virginia	L 70–78	2–1 (1–1)	The Citadel Armory; Charleston, South Carolina
December 16*	Clemson	L 62–68	2–2	The Citadel Armory; Charleston, South Carolina
December 21*	at Toledo	L 58–96	2–3	Toledo, Ohio
December 28*	vs. West Virginia; Canton Invitational Tournament	W 88–69	3–3	Canton, Ohio
December 29*	vs. Westminster; Canton Invitational Tournament	L 65–80	3–4	Canton, Ohio
January 3	Richmond	L 68–76	3–5 (1–2)	The Citadel Armory; Charleston, South Carolina
January 6	at Davidson	L 71–77	3–6 (1–3)	Johnston Gym; Davidson, North Carolina
January 8	Furman	L 51–59	3–7 (1–4)	The Citadel Armory; Charleston, South Carolina
January 10	at VMI	L 69–71	3–8 (1–5)	Cormack Field House; Lexington, Virginia
January 11	at William & Mary	L 58–71	3–9 (1–6)	Blow Gymnasium; Williamsburg, Virginia
January 15*	Southern Miss	W 79–67	4–9	The Citadel Armory; Charleston, South Carolina
January 30*	at Memphis State	L 72–86	4–10	Memorial Fieldhouse; Memphis, Tennessee
January 31*	at Arkansas State	L 75–80	4–11	Jonesboro, Arkansas
February 3	VMI	L 70–73	4–12 (1–7)	The Citadel Armory; Charleston, South Carolina
February 6*	at Georgia	L 86–91	4–13	Auburn Sports Arena; Auburn, Alabama
February 8*	East Tennessee State	W 86–67	5–13	The Citadel Armory; Charleston, South Carolina
February 10	at Furman	W 86–75	6–13 (2–7)	Greenville Memorial Auditorium; Greenville, South Carolina
February 15	at Richmond	W 58–57	7–13 (3–7)	Richmond Arena; Richmond, Virginia
February 16	at George Washington	L 76–79	7–14 (3–8)	Washington, D.C.
February 24	Davidson	W 70–62	8–14 (4–8)	The Citadel Armory; Charleston, South Carolina
1962 Southern Conference men's basketball tournament
March 1	vs. Virginia Tech	L 83–101	8–15	Richmond Arena; Richmond, Virginia
*Non-conference game. (#) Tournament seedings in parentheses. All times are in Eastern Time.

== 1962–63 ==
1962–63 The Citadel Bulldogs men's basketball
- Conference: Southern Conference
- Record: 3–20 (2–10 SoCon)
- Head coach: Mel Thompson
- Home arena: The Citadel Armory

1962–63 Southern Conference men's basketball standings
	Conf.				Overall
Team	W		L	PCT	W		L	PCT
West Virginia †	11	–	2	.846	23	–	8	.742
Davidson	8	–	3	.727	20	–	7	.741
William & Mary	10	–	5	.667	15	–	9	.625
Furman	9	–	6	.600	14	–	14	.500
George Washington	6	–	6	.500	8	–	15	.348
Virginia Tech	6	–	6	.500	12	–	12	.500
VMI	6	–	10	.375	6	–	15	.286
Richmond	3	–	13	.188	7	–	18	.280
The Citadel	2	–	10	.167	3	–	20	.130
† Southern Conference Tournament winner Rankings from AP Poll

Date time, TV	Opponent	Result	Record	Site city, state
December 1	at No. 5 West Virginia	L 61–86	0–1 (0–1)	WVU Field House; Morgantown, West Virginia
December 3*	Georgia	L 73–89	0–2	The Citadel Armory; Charleston, South Carolina
December 8*	East Carolina	L 66–83	0–3	The Citadel Armory; Charleston, South Carolina
December 15	Richmond	W 80–76	1–3 (1–1)	The Citadel Armory; Charleston, South Carolina
December 17*	at Tennessee	L 56–73	1–4	Stokely Athletic Center; Knoxville, Tennessee
December 19*	at Marshall	L 69–71	1–5	Veterans Memorial Fieldhouse; Huntington, West Virginia
December 28*	at East Tennessee State	L 61–64	1–6	Johnson City, Tennessee
December 29*	vs. Tennessee Tech	L 73–75	1–7	Johnson City, Tennessee
January 3	at Richmond	L 98–112	1–8 (1–2)	Richmond Arena; Richmond, Virginia
January 5	VMI	L 71–106	1–9 (1–3)	The Citadel Armory; Charleston, South Carolina
January 8	at William & Mary	L 69–83	1–10 (1–4)	Blow Gymnasium; Williamsburg, Virginia
January 12	Furman	W 83–78	2–10 (2–4)	The Citadel Armory; Charleston, South Carolina
January 14*	at Clemson	L 56–93	2–11	Clemson Field House; Clemson, South Carolina
January 26*	at NC State	L 65–82	2–12	Reynolds Coliseum; Raleigh, North Carolina
January 29*	at Florida	L 75–83	2–13	Florida Gymnasium; Gainesville, Florida
February 2	William & Mary	L 69–82	2–14 (2–5)	The Citadel Armory; Charleston, South Carolina
February 4	Davidson	L 49–50	2–15 (2–6)	The Citadel Armory; Charleston, South Carolina
February 8	George Washington	L 52–59	2–16 (2–7)	The Citadel Armory; Charleston, South Carolina
February 9*	Memphis State	L 63–72	2–17	The Citadel Armory; Charleston, South Carolina
February 12	VMI	L 65–70	2–18 (2–8)	The Citadel Armory; Charleston, South Carolina
February 16	at Furman	L 55–59	2–19 (2–9)	Greenville Memorial Auditorium; Greenville, South Carolina
February 21*	Arkansas State	W 71–57	3–19	The Citadel Armory; Charleston, South Carolina
February 23	at Davidson	L 71–99	3–20 (2–10)	Johnston Gym; Davidson, North Carolina
*Non-conference game. (#) Tournament seedings in parentheses. All times are in Eastern Time.

== 1963–64 ==
1963–64 The Citadel Bulldogs men's basketball
- Conference: Southern Conference
- Record: 11–10 (4–8 SoCon)
- Head coach: Mel Thompson
- Home arena: McAlister Field House

1963–64 Southern Conference men's basketball standings
	Conf.				Overall
Team	W		L	PCT	W		L	PCT
No. 10 Davidson	9	–	2	.818	22	–	4	.846
West Virginia	11	–	3	.786	18	–	10	.643
Virginia Tech	7	–	3	.700	16	–	7	.696
VMI †	7	–	7	.500	12	–	12	.500
Furman	7	–	8	.467	11	–	15	.423
George Washington	5	–	7	.417	11	–	15	.423
William & Mary	5	–	9	.357	9	–	13	.409
The Citadel	4	–	8	.333	11	–	10	.524
Richmond	4	–	12	.250	6	–	16	.273
† Southern Conference Tournament winner Rankings from AP Poll

Date time, TV	Opponent	Result	Record	Site city, state
November 30*	Erskine	W 69–59	1–0	The Citadel Armory; Charleston, South Carolina
December 2	West Virginia	L 53–58	1–1 (0–1)	The Citadel Armory; Charleston, South Carolina
December 7*	Clemson	W 68–57	2–1	The Citadel Armory; Charleston, South Carolina
December 12*	Presbyterian	W 97–61	3–1	The Citadel Armory; Charleston, South Carolina
December 14	at Richmond	L 73–77	3–2 (0–2)	Richmond Arena; Richmond, Virginia
December 16	at George Washington	L 81–102	3–3 (0–3)	Washington, D.C.
December 18*	at Delaware	W 88–78	4–3	Newark, Delaware
December 27*	vs. Alabama; Poinsettia Classic	W 76–67	5–3	Greenville Memorial Auditorium; Greenville, South Carolina
December 28*	at Furman	W 42–41	6–3	Greenville Memorial Auditorium; Greenville, South Carolina
January 4	Richmond	L 65–67	6–4 (0–4)	The Citadel Armory; Charleston, South Carolina
January 6	William & Mary	W 63–60	7–4 (1–4)	The Citadel Armory; Charleston, South Carolina
January 11	Furman	W 74–65	8–4 (2–4)	The Citadel Armory; Charleston SC
January 13	at No. 5 Davidson	L 67–88	8–5 (2–5)	Johnston Gym; Davidson, North Carolina
January 28*	Georgia Southern	L 83–91	8–6	The Citadel Armory; Charleston, South Carolina
February 1	at William & Mary	W 80–56	9–6 (3–5)	Blow Gymnasium; Williamsburg, Virginia
February 3*	East Carolina	W 85–79	10–6	The Citadel Armory; Charleston, South Carolina
February 8	at Furman	L 59–61	10–7 (3–6)	Greenville Memorial Auditorium; Greenville, South Carolina
February 11	VMI	L 88–89	10–8 (3–7)	The Citadel Armory; Charleston, South Carolina
February 22	at VMI	W 79–77	11–8 (4–7)	Cormack Field House; Lexington, Virginia
February	No. 8 Davidson	L 78–86	11–9 (5–8)	The Citadel Armory; Charleston, South Carolina
1964 Southern Conference men's basketball tournament
February 27	vs. No. 7 Davidson	L 62–91	11–10	Charlotte Coliseum; Charlotte, North Carolina
*Non-conference game. (#) Tournament seedings in parentheses. All times are in Eastern Time.

== 1964–65 ==
1964–65 The Citadel Bulldogs men's basketball
- Conference: Southern Conference
- Record: 13–11 (8–7 SoCon)
- Head coach: Mel Thompson
- Home arena: McAlister Field House

1964–65 Southern Conference men's basketball standings
	Conf.				Overall
Team	W		L	PCT	W		L	PCT
No. 6 Davidson	12	–	0	1.000	24	–	2	.923
Virginia Tech	9	–	5	.643	13	–	10	.565
The Citadel	8	–	4	.667	13	–	11	.542
West Virginia †	8	–	6	.571	14	–	15	.483
George Washington	6	–	7	.462	10	–	13	.435
William & Mary	6	–	8	.429	12	–	13	.480
Richmond	6	–	10	.375	10	–	16	.385
VMI	5	–	9	.357	8	–	13	.381
Furman	2	–	13	.133	6	–	19	.240
East Carolina*		–		–	12	–	10	.545
† Tournament winner * – Played as non-major program As of April 30, 1965; Rankings from AP Poll

Date time, TV	Opponent	Result	Record	Site city, state
December 1	at West Virginia	W 75–73	1–0 (1–0)	WVU Field House; Morgantown, West Virginia
December 5*	Arkansas State	W 94–75	2–0	The Citadel Armory; Charleston, South Carolina
December 7*	at Clemson	L 75–90	2–1	Clemson Field House; Clemson, South Carolina
December 11*	Presbyterian	W 86–37	3–1	The Citadel Armory; Charleston, South Carolina
December 12	George Washington	W 69–68	4–1 (2–0)	The Citadel Armory; Charleston, South Carolina
December 15	at Richmond	W 76–75	5–1 (3–0)	Richmond Arena; Richmond, Virginia
December 17*	at Marshall	W 96–84	6–1	Veterans Memorial Fieldhouse; Huntington, West Virginia
December 19*	at Toledo	L 78–82	6–2	Toledo, Ohio
December 30*	at East Tennessee State	W 65–63	7–2	Johnson City, Tennessee
December 31	at Virginia Tech	W 94–90	8–2 (4–0)	Cassell Coliseum; Blacksburg, Virginia
January 4	at VMI	L 70–71	8–3 (4–1)	Cormack Field House; Lexington, Virginia
January 5	at William & Mary	W 70–64	9–3 (5–1)	Blow Gymnasium; Williamsburg, Virginia
January 8	Furman	W 99–96	10–3 (6–1)	The Citadel Armory; Charleston, South Carolina
January 11	No. 10 Davidson	L 81–100	10–4 (6–2)	The Citadel Armory; Charleston, South Carolina
January 15	at East Carolina	L 69–75	10–5 (6–3)	Greenville, North Carolina
January 18*	Erskine	W 108–62	11–5	The Citadel Armory; Charleston, South Carolina
January 30	Richmond	L 81–83	11–6 (6–4)	The Citadel Armory; Charleston, South Carolina
February 3	William & Mary	L 70–79	11–7 (6–5)	The Citadel Armory; Charleston, South Carolina
February 5	VMI	W 84–72	12–7 (7–5)	The Citadel Armory; Charleston, South Carolina
February 8	East Carolina	L 71–81	12–8 (7–6)	The Citadel Armory; Charleston, South Carolina
February 11*	at Georgia Southern	L 82–107	12–9	Statesboro, Georgia
February 13*	Phillips 66ers	L 80–82		The Citadel Armory; Charleston, South Carolina
February 16	at Furman	W 69–57	13–9 (8–6)	Greenville Memorial Auditorium; Greenville, South Carolina
February 20	at No. 5 Davidson	L 50–62	13–10 (8–7)	Johnston Gym; Davidson, North Carolina
1965 Southern Conference men's basketball tournament
February 25	vs. William & Mary	L 60–68	13–11	Charlotte Coliseum; Charlotte, North Carolina
*Non-conference game. (#) Tournament seedings in parentheses. All times are in Eastern Time.

== 1965–66 ==
1965–66 The Citadel Bulldogs men's basketball
- Conference: Southern Conference
- Record: 7–16 (4–9 SoCon)
- Head coach: Mel Thompson
- Home arena: McAlister Field House

1965–66 Southern Conference men's basketball standings
	Conf.				Overall
Team	W		L	PCT	W		L	PCT
Davidson †	11	–	1	.917	21	–	7	.750
West Virginia	8	–	2	.800	19	–	9	.679
William & Mary	8	–	3	.727	13	–	12	.520
Richmond	9	–	7	.563	12	–	13	.480
East Carolina	5	–	7	.417	11	–	15	.423
Furman	4	–	8	.333	9	–	17	.346
VMI	5	–	11	.313	5	–	18	.217
The Citadel	4	–	9	.308	7	–	16	.304
George Washington	3	–	9	.250	3	–	18	.143
† Southern Conference Tournament winner Rankings from AP Poll

Date time, TV	Opponent	Result	Record	Site city, state
December 1*	at Arkansas State	L 73–74	0–1	Jonesboro, Arkansas
December 4*	Jacksonville	W 93–84	1–1	The Citadel Armory; Charleston, South Carolina
December 6*	Stetson	W 71–64	2–1	The Citadel Armory; Charleston, South Carolina
December 9*	Georgia Southern	W 78–73	3–1	The Citadel Armory; Charleston, South Carolina
December 11*	at East Tennessee State	L 75–102	3–2	Johnson City, Tennessee
December 16	at George Washington	L 84–95	3–3 (0–1)	Washington, D.C.
December 17	at Richmond	L 86–100	3–4 (0–2)	Richmond Arena; Richmond, Virginia
December 20*	at Xavier	L 81–104	3–5	Schmidt Field House; Cincinnati, Ohio
December 30*	at Duquesne	L 60–86	3–6	Pittsburgh Civic Arena; Pittsburgh, Pennsylvania
January 3	at East Carolina	L 66–68	3–7 (0–3)	The Citadel Armory; Charleston, South Carolina
January 8	Furman	L 72–74	3–8 (0–4)	The Citadel Armory; Charleston, South Carolina
January 11	at Davidson	L 77–81	3–9 (0–5)	Johnston Gym; Davidson, North Carolina
January 15	East Carolina	W 82–74	4–9 (1–5)	The Citadel Armory; Charleston, South Carolina
January 18*	Clemson	L 61–70	4–10	The Citadel Armory; Charleston, South Carolina
January 29	William & Mary	L 65–70	4–11 (1–6)	The Citadel Armory; Charleston, South Carolina
February 4	Richmond	W 88–70	5–11 (2–6)	The Citadel Armory; Charleston, South Carolina
February 7	at William & Mary	L 46–59	5–12 (2–7)	Blow Gymnasium; Williamsburg, Virginia
February 8	at VMI	L 77–80	5–13 (2–8)	Cormack Field House; Lexington, Virginia
February 12	at Furman	W 77–75	6–13 (3–8)	Greenville Memorial Auditorium; Greenville, South Carolina
February 14	VMI	W 71–69	7–13 (4–8)	The Citadel Armory; Charleston, South Carolina
February 16*	Virginia Tech	L 61–67	7–14	The Citadel Armory; Charleston, South Carolina
February 19	Davidson	L 64–77	7–15 (4–9)	The Citadel Armory; Charleston, South Carolina
1966 Southern Conference men's basketball tournament
February 24	vs. Davidson	L 61–79	7–16	Charlotte Coliseum; Charlotte, North Carolina
*Non-conference game. (#) Tournament seedings in parentheses. All times are in Eastern Time.

== 1967–68 ==
1967–68 The Citadel Bulldogs men's basketball
- Conference: Southern Conference
- Record: 11–14 (6–5 SoCon)
- Head coach: Dick Campbell
- Home arena: McAlister Field House

1967–68 Southern Conference men's basketball standings
	Conf.				Overall
Team	W		L	PCT	W		L	PCT
No. 8 Davidson †	9	–	1	.900	24	–	5	.828
West Virginia	9	–	2	.818	19	–	9	.679
The Citadel	6	–	5	.545	11	–	14	.440
VMI	8	–	7	.533	9	–	12	.429
Furman	6	–	6	.500	13	–	14	.481
Richmond	8	–	8	.500	12	–	13	.480
East Carolina	6	–	7	.462	9	–	16	.360
William & Mary	4	–	10	.286	6	–	18	.250
George Washington	2	–	12	.143	5	–	19	.208
† 1968 Southern Conference tournament winner Rankings from AP Poll

Date time, TV	Opponent	Result	Record	Site city, state
December 1*	at Auburn	W 73–70	1–0	Auburn Sports Arena; Auburn, Alabama
December 4*	Clemson	W 74–70	2–0	The Citadel Armory; Charleston, South Carolina
December 7*	Wofford	L 60–68	2–1	The Citadel Armory; Charleston, South Carolina
December 9*	Stetson	L 76–77	2–2	The Citadel Armory; Charleston, South Carolina
December 14*	at Merchant Marine	W 83–80	3–2	Edwin J. O'Hara Hall; Kings Point, New York
December 16	at George Washington	W 83–66	4–2 (1–0)	Washington, D.C.
December 27*	at Arkansas State; Arkansas State Invitational	W 79–71	5–2	Jonesboro, Arkansas
December 28*	vs. New Mexico State	L 66–92	5–3	Jonesboro, Arkansas
January 2*	Florida State	L 75–96	5–4	The Citadel Armory; Charleston, South Carolina
January 4*	Loyola	W 61–59	6–4	The Citadel Armory; Charleston, South Carolina
January 6	at Richmond	L 70–83	6–5 (1–1)	Richmond Arena; Richmond, Virginia
January 13	Furman	L 85–95	6–6 (1–2)	The Citadel Armory; Charleston, South Carolina
January 15	East Carolina	W 59–57	7–6 (2–2)	The Citadel Armory; Charleston, South Carolina
January 25*	at Jacksonville	L 59–63	7–7	Jacksonville, Florida
January 27	Richmond	W 92–77	8–7 (3–2)	The Citadel Armory; Charleston, South Carolina
January 29*	Hofstra	L 77–80	8–8	The Citadel Armory; Charleston, South Carolina
February 2	at VMI	L 67–81	8–9 (3–3)	Cormack Field House; Lexington, Virginia
February 3	at William & Mary	W 84–75	9–9 (4–3)	Blow Gymnasium; Williamsburg, Virginia
February 7*	at Florida State	L 50–93	9–10	Tully Gymnasium; Tallahassee, Florida
February 10*	Jacksonville	L 90–101	9–11	The Citadel Armory; Charleston, South Carolina
February 12	VMI	L 77–87	9–12 (4–4)	The Citadel Armory; Charleston, South Carolina
February 17	at Furman	W 77–61	10–12 (5–4)	Greenville Memorial Auditorium; Greenville, South Carolina
February 19	at East Carolina	L 78–81	10–13 (5–5)	Greenville, North Carolina
February 22	William & Mary	W 84–73	11–13 (6–5)	The Citadel Armory; Charleston, South Carolina
1968 Southern Conference men's basketball tournament
February 28	vs. Richmond	L 88–100 ^{OT}	11–14	Charlotte Coliseum; Charlotte, North Carolina
*Non-conference game. (#) Tournament seedings in parentheses. All times are in Eastern Time.

== 1968–69 ==
1968–69 The Citadel Bulldogs men's basketball
- Conference: Southern Conference
- Record: 13–12 (5–8 SoCon)
- Head coach: Dick Campbell
- Home arena: McAlister Field House

1968–69 Southern Conference men's basketball standings
	Conf.				Overall
Team	W		L	PCT	W		L	PCT
No. 5 Davidson †	9	–	0	1.000	27	–	3	.900
East Carolina	9	–	2	.818	17	–	11	.607
George Washington	7	–	5	.583	14	–	11	.560
Richmond	6	–	7	.462	13	–	14	.481
Furman	5	–	6	.455	9	–	17	.346
The Citadel	5	–	8	.385	13	–	12	.520
William & Mary	3	–	8	.273	6	–	20	.231
VMI	3	–	11	.214	5	–	18	.217
† 1969 Southern Conference tournament winner Rankings from AP Poll

Date time, TV	Opponent	Result	Record	Site city, state
November 30	George Washington	L 91–101	0–1 (0–1)	McAlister Field House; Charleston, South Carolina
December 2	VMI	W 88–70	1–1 (1–1)	The Citadel Armory; Charleston, South Carolina
December 7*	Augusta	W 93–75	2–1	The Citadel Armory; Charleston, South Carolina
December 11*	at Stetson	W 87–74	3–1	DeLand, Florida
December 14*	Appalachian State	W 80–78	4–1	The Citadel Armory; Charleston, South Carolina
December 27*	vs. Memphis State; Poinsettia Classic	W 76–73	5–1	Greenville Memorial Auditorium; Greenville, South Carolina
December 28*	vs. NYU	L 62–87	5–2	Greenville Memorial Auditorium; Greenville, South Carolina
January 2*	at Clemson	W 73–72	6–2	Littlejohn Coliseum; Clemson, South Carolina
January 4	at East Carolina	L 64–75	6–3 (1–2)	Williams Arena at Minges Coliseum; Greenville, North Carolina
January 6*	Wofford	W 102–85	7–3	The Citadel Armory; Charleston, South Carolina
January 9	at William & Mary	L 56–73	7–4 (1–3)	Blow Gymnasium; Williamsburg, Virginia
January 11	at Furman	W 67–64	8–4 (2–3)	Greenville Memorial Auditorium; Greenville, South Carolina
January 13	Chattanooga	W 73–72 ^{OT}	9–4	The Citadel Armory; Charleston, South Carolina
January 18*	UNC Wilmington	W 97–84	10–4	The Citadel Armory; Charleston, South Carolina
January 25	at No. 4 Davidson	L 72–80	10–5 (2–4)	Johnston Gym; Davidson, North Carolina
January 28*	NC State	L 65–84	10–6	The Citadel Armory; Charleston, South Carolina
February 1	Richmond	W 81–77	11–6 (3–4)	The Citadel Armory; Charleston, South Carolina
February 3	William & Mary	W 95–61	12–6 (4–4)	The Citadel Armory; Charleston, South Carolina
February 8	Furman	L 84–89	12–7 (4–5)	The Citadel Armory; Charleston, South Carolina
February 10	at VMI	W 79–77	13–7 (5–5)	Cormack Field House; Lexington, Virginia
February 14	at George Washington	L 53–84	13–8 (5–6)	Washington, D.C.
February 15	at Richmond	L 89–108	13–9 (5–7)	Richmond Arena; Richmond, Virginia
February 18	East Carolina	L 68–97	13–10 (5–8)	The Citadel Armory; Charleston, South Carolina
February 22*	at No. 3 North Carolina	L 59–106	13–11	Carmichael Arena; Chapel Hill, North Carolina
1969 Southern Conference men's basketball tournament
February 27	vs. George Washington	L 73–90	13–12	Charlotte Coliseum; Charlotte, North Carolina
*Non-conference game. (#) Tournament seedings in parentheses. All times are in Eastern Time.
