= 1959–60 William & Mary Indians men's basketball team =

American college basketball season

1959–60 William & Mary Indians men's basketball
- Conference: Southern Conference
- Record: 15–11 (10–5 SoCon)
- Head coach: Bill Chambers (3rd season)
- Home arena: Blow Gymnasium

1959–60 Southern Conference men's basketball standings
	Conf.				Overall
Team	W		L	PCT	W		L	PCT
Virginia Tech	12	–	1	.923	20	–	6	.769
No. 5 West Virginia †	9	–	2	.818	26	–	5	.839
William & Mary	10	–	5	.667	15	–	11	.577
The Citadel	8	–	4	.667	15	–	8	.652
George Washington	7	–	5	.583	15	–	11	.577
Furman	6	–	7	.462	9	–	16	.360
VMI	3	–	11	.214	4	–	16	.200
Richmond	2	–	12	.143	7	–	18	.280
Davidson	0	–	10	.000	5	–	19	.208
† Southern Conference Tournament winner Rankings from AP Poll

The 1959–60 William & Mary Indians men's basketball team represented the College of William & Mary in intercollegiate basketball during the 1959–60 NCAA University Division men's basketball season. Under the third year of head coach Bill Chambers, the team finished the season 15–11 and 10–5 in the Southern Conference. William & Mary played its home games at Blow Gymnasium. This was the 55th season of the collegiate basketball program at William & Mary, whose nickname is now the Tribe.

The Indians finished in 3rd place in the conference and qualified for the 1960 Southern Conference men's basketball tournament, held at the Richmond Arena. William & Mary defeated Furman in the quarterfinals before losing in the semifinals to top-seeded West Virginia.

== Program notes ==
- William & Mary played one team for the first time this season: Duquesne.
- Jeff Cohen, for the second consecutive year, was also named to the first team all-Southern Conference. Ben Vaughan was named to the second team.

== Schedule ==
Date time, TV	Rank^{#}	Opponent^{#}	Result	Record	Site city, state
Regular season
*		Virginia	W 82–70	1–0	Blow Gymnasium; Williamsburg, VA
		at VMI	W 79–78	2–0 (1–0)	Cormack Field House; Lexington, VA
December 5*		at Tennessee	W 77–71	3–0	University of Tennessee Armory–Fieldhouse; Knoxville, TN
*		Hampden–Sydney	W 97–83	4–0	Blow Gymnasium; Williamsburg, VA
December 11*		vs. Duquesne; Steel Bowl	L 52–53	4–1	Fitzgerald Field House; Pittsburgh, PA
December 12*		vs. St. John's (NY); Steel Bowl	L 65–77	4–2	Fitzgerald Field House; Pittsburgh, PA
*		Morris Harvey	W 95–82	5–2	Blow Gymnasium; Williamsburg, VA
		at George Washington	L 71–98	5–3 (1–1)	Fort Myer Gymnasium; Fort Myer, VA
December 28*		vs. Lafayette; UR Invitational	L 63–81	5–4	Richmond Arena; Richmond, VA
December 29*		at Richmond; UR Invitational	L 65–71	5–5	Richmond Arena; Richmond, VA
		Davidson	W 72–64	6–5 (2–1)	Blow Gymnasium; Williamsburg, VA
January 9		at Richmond	W 90–76	7–5 (3–1)	Richmond Arena; Richmond, VA
January 11		vs. No. 3 West Virginia	L 74–94	7–6 (3–2)	WVU Field House; Morgantown, WV
January 14*		vs. Pittsburgh	L 69–75	7–7	Fitzgerald Field House; Pittsburgh, PA
		VPI	L 91–92	7–8 (3–3)	Blow Gymnasium; Williamsburg, VA
January 30		vs. No. 4 West Virginia	W 94–86	8–8 (4–3)	Norfolk Municipal Auditorium; Norfolk, VA
		The Citadel	W 79–65	9–8 (5–3)	Blow Gymnasium; Williamsburg, VA
February 6		Furman	W 101–68	10–8 (6–3)	Blow Gymnasium; Williamsburg, VA
		at VPI	L 66–82	10–9 (6–4)	War Memorial Gymnasium; Blacksburg, VA
		VMI	W 89–67	11–9 (7–4)	Blow Gymnasium; Williamsburg, VA
		George Washington	W 75–66	12–9 (8–4)	Blow Gymnasium; Williamsburg, VA
February 15		at Furman	L 73–92	12–10 (8–5)	Greenville Memorial Auditorium; Greenville, SC
		at Davidson	W 73–65	13–10 (9–5)	Johnston Gym; Davidson, NC
February 20		Richmond	W 64–42	14–10 (10–5)	Blow Gymnasium; Williamsburg, VA
1960 Southern Conference Basketball Tournament
February 25		at (6) Furman; Quarterfinals	W 82–74	15–10	Richmond Arena; Richmond, VA
February 26		vs. No. 7 (2) West Virginia; Semifinals	L 83–117	15–11	Richmond Arena; Richmond, VA
*Non-conference game. ^{#}Rankings from AP Poll. (#) Tournament seedings in parentheses.
