= 1963–64 William & Mary Indians men's basketball team =

American college basketball season

1963–64 William & Mary Indians men's basketball
- Conference: Southern Conference
- Record: 9–13 (5–9 SoCon)
- Head coach: Bill Chambers (7th season)
- Home arena: Blow Gymnasium; Norfolk Municipal Auditorium (one game)

1963–64 Southern Conference men's basketball standings
	Conf.				Overall
Team	W		L	PCT	W		L	PCT
No. 10 Davidson	9	–	2	.818	22	–	4	.846
West Virginia	11	–	3	.786	18	–	10	.643
Virginia Tech	7	–	3	.700	16	–	7	.696
VMI †	7	–	7	.500	12	–	12	.500
Furman	7	–	8	.467	11	–	15	.423
George Washington	5	–	7	.417	11	–	15	.423
William & Mary	5	–	9	.357	9	–	13	.409
The Citadel	4	–	8	.333	11	–	10	.524
Richmond	4	–	12	.250	6	–	16	.273
† Southern Conference Tournament winner Rankings from AP Poll

The 1963–64 William & Mary Indians men's basketball team represented the College of William & Mary in intercollegiate basketball during the 1963–64 NCAA University Division men's basketball season. Under the seventh year of head coach Bill Chambers, the team finished the season 9–13 and 5–9 in the Southern Conference.

William & Mary played most of its home games on campus at Blow Gymnasium, with one home game played off campus at the Norfolk Municipal Auditorium in Norfolk, Virginia. This was the 59th season of the collegiate basketball program at William & Mary, whose nickname is now the Tribe.

The Indians finished in seventh place in the conference and qualified for the 1964 Southern Conference men's basketball tournament, held at the Charlotte Coliseum in Charlotte, North Carolina. William & Mary, however, fell to second-seeded West Virginia in the first round.

The Indians did not participate in a post-season tournament.

== Schedule ==
Date time, TV	Rank^{#}	Opponent^{#}	Result	Record	Site city, state
Regular season
December 3*		Hampden–Sydney	W 81–49	1–0	Blow Gymnasium; Williamsburg, VA
December 6		at VMI	W 67–60	2–0 (1–0)	Cormack Field House; Lexington, VA
December 14		Furman	W 67–60	3–0 (2–0)	Blow Gymnasium; Williamsburg, VA
December 18		at West Virginia	L 73–78	3–1 (2–1)	Stansbury Hall; Morgantown, WV
December 20*		at Arkansas State; Arkansas State Tournament	W 73–71 ^{OT}	4–1	Jonesboro, AR
December 21*		vs. Texas Western; Arkansas State Tournament	L 51–61	4–2	Jonesboro, AR
December 27*		vs. Eastern Kentucky; Watauga Invitational	W 73–71 ^{OT}	4–3	Brooks Gym; Johnson City, TN
December 28*		at East Tennessee State; Watauga Invitational	L 51–61	5–3	Brooks Gym; Johnson City, TN
January 4		at Furman	W 66–60	6–3 (3–1)	Greenville Memorial Auditorium; Greenville, SC
January 6		at The Citadel	L 60–63	6–4 (3–2)	McAlister Field House; Charleston, SC
January 11		at Richmond	L 52–53	6–5 (3–3)	Richmond Arena; Richmond, VA
January 13*		East Carolina	W 64–47	7–5	Blow Gymnasium; Williamsburg, VA
January 16		VPI	L 66–73	7–6 (3–4)	Blow Gymnasium; Williamsburg, VA
February 1		The Citadel	L 67–80	7–7 (3–5)	Blow Gymnasium; Williamsburg, VA
February 4		vs. No. 5 Davidson	L 84–111	7–8 (3–6)	Norfolk Municipal Auditorium; Norfolk, VA
February 6		at George Washington	L 77–81	7–9 (3–7)	Fort Myer Gymnasium; Fort Myer, VA
February 8*		Virginia	L 54–56	7–10	Blow Gymnasium; Williamsburg, VA
February 10		at VPI	L 86–90 ^{2OT}	7–11 (3–8)	Cassell Coliseum; Blacksburg, VA
February 15		VMI	L 65–70	7–12 (3–9)	Blow Gymnasium; Williamsburg, VA
February 19		George Washington	W 82–67	8–12 (4–9)	Blow Gymnasium; Williamsburg, VA
February 22		Richmond	W 84–53	9–12 (5–9)	Blow Gymnasium; Williamsburg, VA
1964 Southern Conference Basketball Tournament
February 27		vs. (2) West Virginia; Quarterfinals	L 73–85	9–13	Charlotte Coliseum; Charlotte, NC
*Non-conference game. ^{#}Rankings from AP Poll. (#) Tournament seedings in parentheses.
