= 1960–61 William & Mary Indians men's basketball team =

American college basketball season

1960–61 William & Mary Indians men's basketball
- Conference: Southern Conference
- Record: 14–10 (9–6 SoCon)
- Head coach: Bill Chambers (4th season)
- MVP: Jeff Cohen
- Home arena: Blow Gymnasium; Norfolk Municipal Auditorium (one game)

1960–61 Southern Conference men's basketball standings
	Conf.				Overall
Team	W		L	PCT	W		L	PCT
No. 9 West Virginia	11	–	1	.917	23	–	4	.852
Virginia Tech	12	–	3	.800	15	–	7	.682
The Citadel	10	–	3	.769	17	–	8	.680
William & Mary	9	–	6	.600	14	–	10	.583
Furman	6	–	7	.462	15	–	11	.577
Richmond	5	–	11	.313	9	–	14	.391
George Washington †	3	–	9	.250	9	–	17	.346
VMI	3	–	11	.214	5	–	17	.227
Davidson	2	–	10	.167	9	–	14	.391
† Southern Conference Tournament winner Rankings from AP Poll

The 1960–61 William & Mary Indians men's basketball team represented the College of William & Mary in intercollegiate basketball during the 1960–61 NCAA University Division men's basketball season. Under the fourth year of head coach Bill Chambers, the team finished the season 14–10 and 9–6 in the Southern Conference.

William & Mary played its home games at Blow Gymnasium with one home game played at the Norfolk Municipal Auditorium in Norfolk, Virginia. This was the 56th season of the collegiate basketball program at William & Mary, whose nickname is now the Tribe.

The Indians finished in 4th place in the conference and qualified for the 1961 Southern Conference men's basketball tournament, held at the Richmond Arena. William & Mary defeated fifth-seed Furman in the quarterfinals and top-seeded, and #8 in the country, West Virginia in the semifinals before falling to seventh-seed George Washington in the championship game.

The Indians did not participate in a post-season tournament.

== Program notes ==
- Jeff Cohen was named the Southern Conference Men's Basketball Player of the Year, the first ever conference player of the year award for a William & Mary player. The only other players to be named conference players of the year (SoCon, ECAC South, or CAA) have been Tom Jasper in 1970–71 and Marcus Thornton in 2014–15.
- William & Mary's appearance in the Southern Conference championship game would be the second of nine such appearances (the others came in 1959, 1965, 1975, 1983, 2008, 2010, 2014, and 2015). Each of these games were also losses.

== Schedule ==
Date time, TV	Rank^{#}	Opponent^{#}	Result	Record	Site city, state
Regular season
*		Hampden–Sydney	W 113–75	1–0	Blow Gymnasium; Williamsburg, VA
December 3		at West Virginia	L 72–74	1–1 (0–1)	Stansbury Hall; Morgantown, WV
December 5*		at Tennessee	L 76–83	1–2	University of Tennessee Armory–Fieldhouse; Knoxville, TN
December 10		VMI	W 66–58	2–2 (1–1)	Blow Gymnasium; Williamsburg, VA
December 14		at George Washington	W 61–57	3–2 (2–1)	Fort Myer Gymnasium; Fort Myer, VA
December 17		Davidson	W 54–49	4–2 (3–1)	Blow Gymnasium; Williamsburg, VA
December 20*		Virginia	W 80–50	5–2	Memorial Gymnasium; Charlottesville, VA
December 29*		vs. Virginia; UR Invitational	W 91–75	6–2	Richmond Arena; Richmond, VA
December 30*		at Richmond; UR Invitational	L 87–101	6–3	Richmond Arena; Richmond, VA
January 3		at Furman	L 56–78	6–4 (3–2)	Greenville Memorial Auditorium; Greenville, SC
January 4		at Davidson	L 45–54	6–5 (3–3)	Johnston Gym; Davidson, NC
January 7		at Richmond	W 63–60	7–5 (4–3)	Richmond Arena; Richmond, VA
January 10		The Citadel	L 63–64	7–6 (4–4)	Blow Gymnasium; Williamsburg, VA
January 14		VPI	W 74–60	8–6 (5–4)	Blow Gymnasium; Williamsburg, VA
January 28		vs. West Virginia	L 69–76	8–7 (5–5)	Norfolk Municipal Auditorium; Norfolk, VA
February 1		Furman	W 65–57	9–7 (6–5)	Blow Gymnasium; Williamsburg, VA
February 8*		at Navy	L 69–76	9–8	Dahlgren Hall; Annapolis, MD
February 11		George Washington	W 85–80	10–8 (7–5)	Blow Gymnasium; Williamsburg, VA
February 14		at VPI	L 67–85	10–9 (7–6)	War Memorial Gymnasium; Blacksburg, VA
February 17		at VMI	W 86–77	11–9 (8–6)	Cormack Field House; Lexington, VA
February 25		Richmond	W 105–84	12–9 (9–6)	Blow Gymnasium; Williamsburg, VA
1961 Southern Conference Basketball Tournament
March 2		at (5) Furman; Quarterfinals	W 86–84 ^{3OT}	13–9	Richmond Arena; Richmond, VA
March 3		vs. No. 8 (1) West Virginia; Semifinals	W 88–76	14–9	Richmond Arena; Richmond, VA
March 4		vs. (7) George Washington; Championship	L 82–93	14–10	Richmond Arena; Richmond, VA
*Non-conference game. ^{#}Rankings from AP Poll. (#) Tournament seedings in parentheses.
