= 1962–63 William & Mary Indians men's basketball team =

American college basketball season

1962–63 William & Mary Indians men's basketball
- Conference: Southern Conference
- Record: 15–9 (10–5 SoCon)
- Head coach: Bill Chambers (6th season)
- Home arena: Blow Gymnasium; Norfolk Municipal Auditorium (one game)

1962–63 Southern Conference men's basketball standings
	Conf.				Overall
Team	W		L	PCT	W		L	PCT
West Virginia †	11	–	2	.846	23	–	8	.742
Davidson	8	–	3	.727	20	–	7	.741
William & Mary	10	–	5	.667	15	–	9	.625
Furman	9	–	6	.600	14	–	14	.500
George Washington	6	–	6	.500	8	–	15	.348
Virginia Tech	6	–	6	.500	12	–	12	.500
VMI	6	–	10	.375	6	–	15	.286
Richmond	3	–	13	.188	7	–	18	.280
The Citadel	2	–	10	.167	3	–	20	.130
† Southern Conference Tournament winner Rankings from AP Poll

The 1962–63 William & Mary Indians men's basketball team represented the College of William & Mary in intercollegiate basketball during the 1962–63 NCAA University Division men's basketball season. Under the sixth year of head coach Bill Chambers, the team finished the season 15–9 and 10–5 in the Southern Conference.

William & Mary played most of its home games on campus at Blow Gymnasium, with one home game played off campus at the Norfolk Municipal Auditorium in Norfolk, Virginia. This was the 58th season of the collegiate basketball program at William & Mary, whose nickname is now the Tribe.

The Indians finished in 3rd place in the conference and qualified for the 1963 Southern Conference men's basketball tournament, held at the Richmond Arena. Third-seeded William & Mary, however, fell to sixth-seeded VPI in the first round.

The Indians did not participate in a post-season tournament.

== Schedule ==
Date time, TV	Rank^{#}	Opponent^{#}	Result	Record	Site city, state
Regular season
December 1		at George Washington	L 50–60	0–1 (0–1)	Fort Myer Gymnasium; Fort Myer, VA
December 4*		Hampden–Sydney	W 77–64	1–1	Blow Gymnasium; Williamsburg, VA
December 8		at VPI	L 71–77	1–2 (0–2)	Cassell Coliseum; Blacksburg, VA
December 11*		Virginia	W 71–69	2–2	Memorial Gymnasium; Charlottesville, VA
December 14*		at Pittsburgh; Steel Bowl	L 56–66	2–3	Fitzgerald Field House; Pittsburgh, PA
December 15*		vs. Boston College; Steel Bowl	L 53–66	2–4	Fitzgerald Field House; Pittsburgh, PA
December 17		Furman	L 55–56	2–5 (0–3)	Blow Gymnasium; Williamsburg, VA
December 28*		vs. Lehigh; UR Invitational	W 73–58	3–5	Richmond Arena; Richmond, VA
December 29*		at Richmond; UR Invitational	W 76–59	4–5	Richmond Arena; Richmond, VA
January 2		at Davidson	L 70–73	4–6 (0–4)	Johnston Gym; Davidson, NC
January 3		at Furman	W 70–68	5–6 (1–4)	Greenville Memorial Auditorium; Greenville, SC
January 5		at Richmond	L 55–59	5–7 (1–5)	Richmond Arena; Richmond, VA
January 8		The Citadel	W 83–69	6–7 (2–5)	Blow Gymnasium; Williamsburg, VA
January 10		VPI	W 78–63	7–7 (3–5)	Blow Gymnasium; Williamsburg, VA
January 15		VMI	W 80–71	8–7 (4–5)	Blow Gymnasium; Williamsburg, VA
January 30		Davidson	W 70–63	9–7 (5–5)	Blow Gymnasium; Williamsburg, VA
February 4*		at No. 6 Georgia Tech	L 49–50	9–8	Alexander Memorial Coliseum; Atlanta, GA
February 7		at The Citadel	W 82–69	10–8 (6–5)	McAlister Field House; Charleston, SC
February 9		vs. West Virginia	W 75–72	11–8 (7–5)	Norfolk Municipal Auditorium; Norfolk, VA
February 11*		East Carolina	W 81–65	12–8	Blow Gymnasium; Williamsburg, VA
February 15		at VMI	W 75–65	13–8 (8–5)	Cormack Field House; Lexington, VA
February 19		George Washington	W 79–75	14–8 (9–5)	Blow Gymnasium; Williamsburg, VA
February 23		Richmond	W 75–39	15–8 (10–5)	Blow Gymnasium; Williamsburg, VA
1963 Southern Conference Basketball Tournament
February 28		at (6) VPI; Quarterfinals	L 72–74	15–9	Richmond Arena; Richmond, VA
*Non-conference game. ^{#}Rankings from AP Poll. (#) Tournament seedings in parentheses.
