= 1968–69 Davidson Wildcats men's basketball team =

American college basketball season

1968–69 Davidson Wildcats men's basketball

Southern Conference tournament champions

NCAA tournament, Elite Eight
- Conference: Southern Conference
- South

Ranking
- Coaches: No. 3
- AP: No. 5
- Record: 27–3 (9–0 SoCon)
- Head coach: Lefty Driesell (9th season)
- Home arena: Johnston Gym

1968–69 Southern Conference men's basketball standings
	Conf.				Overall
Team	W		L	PCT	W		L	PCT
No. 5 Davidson †	9	–	0	1.000	27	–	3	.900
East Carolina	9	–	2	.818	17	–	11	.607
George Washington	7	–	5	.583	14	–	11	.560
Richmond	6	–	7	.462	13	–	14	.481
Furman	5	–	6	.455	9	–	17	.346
The Citadel	5	–	8	.385	13	–	12	.520
William & Mary	3	–	8	.273	6	–	20	.231
VMI	3	–	11	.214	5	–	18	.217
† 1969 Southern Conference tournament winner Rankings from AP Poll

The 1968–69 Davidson Wildcats men's basketball team represented Davidson College in NCAA men's Division I competition during the 1968–69 NCAA University Division men's basketball season. Led by head coach Lefty Driesell, the team played its home games at Johnston Gym. The Wildcats finished first in the Southern Conference regular season standings and won the Southern Conference tournament to receive an automatic bid to the NCAA tournament – the school's fourth appearance in five years. Davidson finished win an overall record of 27–3 (9–0 SoCon).

== Roster ==
1968–69 Davidson Wildcats men's basketball team
Players	Coaches
Pos. / # / Name / Height / Weight / Year / Hometown; F / 15 / Mike Maloy / 6 ft 7 in (2.01 m) / 215 lb (98 kg) / Jr / New York City, New York	Head coach: Lefty Driesell (Duke); Assistant coach(es) Legend: (C) Team captain; (S) Suspended; (I) Ineligible; (W) Walk-on; Injured; Current redshirt; Roster

== Schedule and results ==
Date time, TV	Rank^{#}	Opponent^{#}	Result	Record	Site city, state
Regular season
Nov 30, 1968		VMI	W 83–72	1–0 (1–0)	Johnston Gym; Davidson, North Carolina
Dec 3, 1968		Furman	W 105–70	2–0 (2–0)	Johnston Gym; Davidson, North Carolina
Dec 7, 1968*		No. 12 Vanderbilt	W 101–84	3–0	Charlotte Coliseum; Charlotte, North Carolina
Dec 17, 1968		at Richmond	W 62–60	4–0 (3–0)	Richmond Arena; Richmond, Virginia
Dec 20, 1968*	No. 3	vs. South Carolina	W 62–55	5–0	Charlotte Coliseum; Charlotte, North Carolina
Dec 27, 1968*		Maryland; Charlotte Invitational Tournament	W 83–69	6–0	Charlotte Coliseum; Charlotte, North Carolina
Dec 28, 1968*		Texas; Charlotte Invitational Tournament	W 98–76	7–0	Charlotte Coliseum; Charlotte, North Carolina
Dec 31, 1968*		at Michigan	W 94–82	8–0	Crisler Arena; Ann Arbor, Michigan
Jan 4, 1969*	No. 2	vs. No. 17 St. John's	W 98–76 ^{OT}	8–1	Charlotte Coliseum; Charlotte, North Carolina
Jan 7, 1969*		Saint Joseph's	W 83–69	9–1	Charlotte Coliseum; Charlotte, North Carolina
Jan 11, 1969*		West Virginia	W 102–71	10–1	Charlotte Coliseum; Charlotte, North Carolina
Jan 15, 1969*		Wake Forest	W 90–82	11–1	Charlotte Coliseum; Charlotte, North Carolina
Jan 18, 1969		at VMI	W 66–64	12–1 (4–0)	Cormack Field House; Lexington, Virginia
Jan 23, 1969*	No. 4	Princeton	W 71–54	13–1	Charlotte Coliseum; Charlotte, North Carolina
Jan 25, 1969	No. 4	The Citadel	W 80–72	14–1 (5–0)	Johnston Gym; Davidson, North Carolina
Jan 28, 1969		at George Washington	W 94–74	15–1 (6–0)	Fort Myer Ceremonial Hall; Washington, D.C.
Feb 1, 1969*	No. 4	vs. Iowa	L 61–76	15–2	Chicago, Illinois
Feb 4, 1969*		at West Virginia	W 94–79	16–2	Stansbury Hall; Morgantown, West Virginia
Feb 6, 1969*		vs. No. 19 Dayton	W 64–63	17–2	Madison Square Garden; New York, New York
Feb 8, 1969		George Washington	W 126–98	18–2 (7–0)	Johnston Gymnasium; Davidson, North Carolina
Feb 11, 1969		Richmond	W 114–95	19–2 (8–0)	Johnston Gymnasium; Davidson, North Carolina
Feb 15, 1969		at Furman	W 103–67	20–2 (9–0)	Greenville Memorial Auditorium; Greenville, South Carolina
Feb 19, 1969*		Duke	W 88–80 ^{OT}	21–2	Charlotte Coliseum; Charlotte, North Carolina
Feb 22, 1969*		vs. Virginia Tech	W 79–71	22–2	Charlotte Coliseum; Charlotte, North Carolina
SoCon Tournament
Feb 27, 1969*	No. 5	VMI; Quarterfinals	W 99–75	23–2	Charlotte Coliseum; Charlotte, North Carolina
Feb 28, 1969*	No. 5	Richmond; Semifinals	W 97–83	24–2	Charlotte Coliseum; Charlotte, North Carolina
Mar 1, 1969*	No. 5	East Carolina; Championship game	W 102–76	25–2	Charlotte Coliseum; Charlotte, North Carolina
NCAA Tournament
Mar 8, 1969*	No. 5	vs. No. 10 Villanova; First round	W 75–61	26–2	Reynolds Coliseum; Raleigh, North Carolina
Mar 13, 1969*	No. 5	vs. No. 8 St. John's; Regional Semifinal – Sweet Sixteen	W 79–69	27–2	Cole Fieldhouse; College Park, Maryland
Mar 15, 1969*	No. 5	vs. No. 4 North Carolina; Regional final – Elite Eight	L 85–87	27–3	Cole Fieldhouse; College Park, Maryland
*Non-conference game. ^{#}Rankings from AP. (#) Tournament seedings in parentheses. All times are in Eastern.
