= 1967–68 Davidson Wildcats men's basketball team =

American college basketball season

1967–68 Davidson Wildcats men's basketball

Southern Conference tournament champions

NCAA tournament, Elite Eight
- Conference: Southern Conference
- South

Ranking
- Coaches: No. 8
- AP: No. 8
- Record: 24–5 (9–1 SoCon)
- Head coach: Lefty Driesell (8th season)
- Home arena: Johnston Gym

1967–68 Southern Conference men's basketball standings
	Conf.				Overall
Team	W		L	PCT	W		L	PCT
No. 8 Davidson †	9	–	1	.900	24	–	5	.828
West Virginia	9	–	2	.818	19	–	9	.679
The Citadel	6	–	5	.545	11	–	14	.440
VMI	8	–	7	.533	9	–	12	.429
Furman	6	–	6	.500	13	–	14	.481
Richmond	8	–	8	.500	12	–	13	.480
East Carolina	6	–	7	.462	9	–	16	.360
William & Mary	4	–	10	.286	6	–	18	.250
George Washington	2	–	12	.143	5	–	19	.208
† 1968 Southern Conference tournament winner Rankings from AP Poll

The 1967–68 Davidson Wildcats men's basketball team represented Davidson College in NCAA men's Division I competition during the 1967–68 NCAA University Division men's basketball season. Led by head coach Lefty Driesell, the team played its home games at Johnston Gym. The Wildcats finished first in the Southern Conference regular season standings and won the Southern Conference tournament to receive an automatic bid to the NCAA tournament – the school's fourth appearance in five years. Davidson finished win an overall record of 24–5 (9–1 SoCon).

== Roster ==
1967–68 Davidson Wildcats men's basketball team
Players
Coaches

Pos.	#	Name	Height	Weight	Year	Hometown
F	15	Mike Maloy	6 ft 7 in (2.01 m)	215 lb (98 kg)	So	New York City, New York
C		Doug Cook	6 ft 6 in (1.98 m)	—	So
C		Perry Crosswhite	6 ft 9 in (2.06 m)	—	Jr	Washington, D.C.
G		Fox DeMoisey	6 ft 3 in (1.91 m)	—	So
G		Wayne Huckel	6 ft 3 in (1.91 m)	—	Jr
C		Rod Knowles	6 ft 9 in (2.06 m)	215 lb (98 kg)	Sr	Greenville, North Carolina
F		Jerry Kroll	6 ft 4 in (1.93 m)	—	So
G		Dave Moser	6 ft 1 in (1.85 m)	—	Jr
F		Mike O'Neill	6 ft 5 in (1.96 m)	—	Jr
		Tony Osborn	6 ft 3 in (1.91 m)	—	Jr
		Bob Pickens	6 ft 1 in (1.85 m)	—
F		Jan Postma	6 ft 5 in (1.96 m)	—	So
		Mike Spann	6 ft 4 in (1.93 m)	—
		Tom Youngdale	6 ft 10 in (2.08 m)	—	Sr

Head coach

- Lefty Driesell (Duke)

Assistant coach(es)

Legend

- (C) Team captain
- (S) Suspended
- (I) Ineligible
- (W) Walk-on
- Injured
- Current redshirt

Roster

== Schedule and results ==
Date time, TV	Rank^{#}	Opponent^{#}	Result	Record	Site city, state
Regular season
Dec 1, 1967*		Bucknell	W 91–70	1–0	Johnston Gym; Davidson, North Carolina
Dec 2, 1967		VMI	W 80–73	2–0 (1–0)	Charlotte Coliseum; Charlotte, North Carolina
Dec 5, 1967		Furman	W 95–68	3–0 (2–0)	Johnston Gym; Davidson, North Carolina
Dec 9, 1967*		Michigan	W 91–70	4–0	Charlotte Coliseum; Charlotte, North Carolina
Dec 12, 1967*		at No. 3 Vanderbilt	L 79–81	4–1	Memorial Gymnasium; Nashville, Tennessee
Dec 15, 1967		William & Mary	W 81–75	5–1 (3–0)	Charlotte Coliseum; Charlotte, North Carolina
Dec 18, 1967*		vs. Rice	W 90–68	6–1	Charlotte Coliseum; Charlotte, North Carolina
Dec 19, 1967*		Temple	W 63–60	7–1	Charlotte Coliseum; Charlotte, North Carolina
Dec 29, 1967*		vs. Memphis State	W 51–44	8–1	
Dec 30, 1967*		vs. No. 9 Vanderbilt	L 67–80	8–2	
Jan 3, 1968*		at Duke	L 84–89	8–3	Duke Indoor Stadium; Durham, North Carolina
Jan 6, 1968*		at St. John's	W 70–54	9–3	Alumni Hall; Queens, New York
Jan 10, 1968		George Washington	W 107–75	10–3 (4–0)	Johnston Gym; Davidson, North Carolina
Jan 13, 1968		at West Virginia	L 86–89 ^{OT}	10–4 (4–1)	Stansbury Hall; Morgantown, West Virginia
Jan 27, 1968*		vs. Wake Forest	W 75–52	11–4	
Jan 31, 1968*		vs. Virginia Tech	W 81–76	12–4	Charlotte Coliseum; Charlotte, North Carolina
Feb 3, 1968		West Virginia	W 91–77	13–4 (5–1)	Charlotte Coliseum; Charlotte, North Carolina
Feb 6, 1968		at Furman	W 55–40	14–4 (6–1)	Greenville Memorial Auditorium; Greenville, South Carolina
Feb 10, 1968		at Richmond	W 85–67	15–4 (7–1)	Richmond Arena; Richmond, Virginia
Feb 14, 1968*		at Saint Joseph's	W 66–60	16–4	Alumni Memorial Fieldhouse; Philadelphia, Pennsylvania
Feb 17, 1968		at George Washington	W 85–72	17–4 (8–1)	Fort Myer Ceremonial Hall; Washington, D.C.
Feb 21, 1968		Richmond	W 106–89	18–4 (9–1)	Johnston Gym; Davidson, North Carolina
Feb 24, 1968*		Tulane	W 76–68	19–4	Charlotte Coliseum; Charlotte, North Carolina
SoCon Tournament
Feb 29, 1968*	(1)	(8) William & Mary; Quarterfinals	W 107–68	20–4	Charlotte Coliseum; Charlotte, North Carolina
Mar 1, 1968*	(1) No. 10	(5) Furman; Semifinals	W 79–63	21–4	Charlotte Coliseum; Charlotte, North Carolina
Mar 2, 1968*	(1) No. 10	(2) West Virginia; Championship game	W 87–70	22–4	Charlotte Coliseum; Charlotte, North Carolina
NCAA Tournament
Mar 9, 1968*	No. 10	vs. St. John's; First round	W 79–70	23–4	Cole Fieldhouse; College Park, Maryland
Mar 15, 1968*	No. 8	vs. No. 7 Columbia; Regional semifinal – Sweet Sixteen	W 61–59 ^{OT}	24–4	Reynolds Coliseum; Raleigh, North Carolina
Mar 16, 1968*	No. 8	vs. No. 4 North Carolina; Regional Final – Elite Eight	L 66–70	24–5	Reynolds Coliseum; Raleigh, North Carolina
*Non-conference game. ^{#}Rankings from AP. (#) Tournament seedings in parentheses. All times are in Eastern.
