= 1960 Southern Conference men's basketball tournament =

- Classification: Division I
- Season: 1959–60
- Teams: 8
- Site: Richmond Arena; Richmond, VA
- Champions: West Virginia (6th title)
- Winning coach: Fred Schaus (6th title)

1959–60 Southern Conference men's basketball standings
	Conf.				Overall
Team	W		L	PCT	W		L	PCT
Virginia Tech	12	–	1	.923	20	–	6	.769
No. 5 West Virginia †	9	–	2	.818	26	–	5	.839
William & Mary	10	–	5	.667	15	–	11	.577
The Citadel	8	–	4	.667	15	–	8	.652
George Washington	7	–	5	.583	15	–	11	.577
Furman	6	–	7	.462	9	–	16	.360
VMI	3	–	11	.214	4	–	16	.200
Richmond	2	–	12	.143	7	–	18	.280
Davidson	0	–	10	.000	5	–	19	.208
† Southern Conference Tournament winner Rankings from AP Poll

The 1960 Southern Conference men's basketball tournament took place from February 25–27, 1960 at the Richmond Arena in Richmond, Virginia. The West Virginia Mountaineers, led by head coach Fred Schaus, won their sixth Southern Conference title and received the automatic berth to the 1960 NCAA tournament.

== Format ==
The top eight finishers of the conference's nine members were eligible for the tournament. Teams were seeded based on conference winning percentage. The tournament used a preset bracket consisting of three rounds.

== Bracket ==
Quarterfinals; February 25
1	Virginia Tech	78
8	Richmond	58
4	The Citadel	60
5	George Washington	74
2	#7 West Virginia	90
7	VMI	83
3	William & Mary	82
6	Furman	74

Semifinals; February 26
1	Virginia Tech	88
5	George Washington	52
2	#7 West Virginia	117
3	William & Mary	83

Finals; February 27
1	Virginia Tech	72
2	#7 West Virginia	82

* Overtime game

== See also ==
- List of Southern Conference men's basketball champions
