= Norfolk Arena =

- For the retitled Norfolk, England, UK venue, see King's Lynn Stadium.
- For the former Norfolk, Virginia, USA venue, see Norfolk Municipal Auditorium.
