= 1963 Southern Conference men's basketball tournament =

- Classification: Division I
- Season: 1962–63
- Teams: 8
- Site: Richmond Arena; Richmond, VA
- Champions: West Virginia (8th title)
- Winning coach: George King (2nd title)

1962–63 Southern Conference men's basketball standings
	Conf.				Overall
Team	W		L	PCT	W		L	PCT
West Virginia †	11	–	2	.846	23	–	8	.742
Davidson	8	–	3	.727	20	–	7	.741
William & Mary	10	–	5	.667	15	–	9	.625
Furman	9	–	6	.600	14	–	14	.500
George Washington	6	–	6	.500	8	–	15	.348
Virginia Tech	6	–	6	.500	12	–	12	.500
VMI	6	–	10	.375	6	–	15	.286
Richmond	3	–	13	.188	7	–	18	.280
The Citadel	2	–	10	.167	3	–	20	.130
† Southern Conference Tournament winner Rankings from AP Poll

The 1963 Southern Conference men's basketball tournament took place from February 28 to March 2, 1963, at the Richmond Arena in Richmond, Virginia. The West Virginia Mountaineers, led by head coach George King, won their eighth Southern Conference title and received the automatic berth to the 1963 NCAA tournament.

== Format ==
The top eight finishers of the conference's nine members were eligible for the tournament. The teams were seeded based on conference winning percentage. The tournament used a preset bracket consisting of three rounds.

== Bracket ==
Quarterfinals; February 28
1	West Virginia	75
8	Richmond	44
4	Furman	57
5	George Washington	54
2	Davidson	108
7	VMI	71
3	William & Mary	72
6	Virginia Tech	74

Semifinals; March 1
1	West Virginia	81
4	Furman	63
2	Davidson	75
6	Virginia Tech	67

Finals; March 2
1	West Virginia	79
2	Davidson	74

* Overtime game

== See also ==
- List of Southern Conference men's basketball champions
