= 1962 Southern Conference men's basketball tournament =

- Classification: Division I
- Season: 1961–62
- Teams: 8
- Site: Richmond Arena; Richmond, VA
- Champions: West Virginia (7th title)
- Winning coach: George King (1st title)

1961–62 Southern Conference men's basketball standings
	Conf.				Overall
Team	W		L	PCT	W		L	PCT
West Virginia †	12	–	1	.923	24	–	6	.800
Virginia Tech	9	–	3	.750	19	–	6	.760
Furman	8	–	5	.615	15	–	12	.556
George Washington	6	–	7	.462	9	–	15	.375
Davidson	5	–	6	.455	14	–	11	.560
VMI	6	–	8	.429	9	–	11	.450
The Citadel	4	–	8	.333	8	–	15	.348
Richmond	5	–	11	.313	6	–	21	.222
William & Mary	5	–	11	.313	7	–	17	.292
† Southern Conference Tournament winner Rankings from AP Poll

The 1962 Southern Conference men's basketball tournament took place from March 1–3, 1962 at the Richmond Arena in Richmond, Virginia. The West Virginia Mountaineers, led by head coach George King, won their seventh Southern Conference title and received the automatic berth to the 1962 NCAA tournament.

== Format ==
The top eight finishers of the conference's nine members were eligible for the tournament. Teams were seeded based on conference winning percentage. The tournament used a preset bracket consisting of three rounds.

== Bracket ==
Quarterfinals; March 1
1	West Virginia	97
8	Richmond	75
4	George Washington	85
5	Davidson	81
2	Virginia Tech	101
7	The Citadel	83
3	Furman	61
6	VMI	76

Semifinals; March 2
1	West Virginia	86
4	George Washington	73
2	Virginia Tech	70
6	VMI	66

Finals; March 3
1	West Virginia	88
2	Virginia Tech	72

* Overtime game

== See also ==
- List of Southern Conference men's basketball champions
