= 1961 Southern Conference men's basketball tournament =

- Classification: Division I
- Season: 1960–61
- Teams: 8
- Site: Richmond Arena; Richmond, VA
- Champions: George Washington (2nd title)
- Winning coach: Bill Reinhart (2nd title)

1960–61 Southern Conference men's basketball standings
	Conf.				Overall
Team	W		L	PCT	W		L	PCT
No. 9 West Virginia	11	–	1	.917	23	–	4	.852
Virginia Tech	12	–	3	.800	15	–	7	.682
The Citadel	10	–	3	.769	17	–	8	.680
William & Mary	9	–	6	.600	14	–	10	.583
Furman	6	–	7	.462	15	–	11	.577
Richmond	5	–	11	.313	9	–	14	.391
George Washington †	3	–	9	.250	9	–	17	.346
VMI	3	–	11	.214	5	–	17	.227
Davidson	2	–	10	.167	9	–	14	.391
† Southern Conference Tournament winner Rankings from AP Poll

The 1961 Southern Conference men's basketball tournament took place from March 2–4, 1961 at the Richmond Arena in Richmond, Virginia. The George Washington Colonials, led by head coach Bill Reinhart, won their second Southern Conference title and received the automatic berth to the 1961 NCAA tournament.

== Format ==
The top eight finishers of the conference's nine members were eligible for the tournament. Teams were seeded based on conference winning percentage. The tournament used a preset bracket consisting of three rounds.

== Bracket ==
Quarterfinals; March 2
1	#8 West Virginia	89
8	VMI	71
4	William & Mary	86***
5	Furman	84
2	Virginia Tech	83
7	George Washington	84
3	The Citadel	70
6	Richmond	66

Semifinals; March 3
1	#8 West Virginia	76
4	William & Mary	88
3	The Citadel	87
7	George Washington	94

Finals; March 4
4	William & Mary	82
7	George Washington	93

* Overtime game

== See also ==
- List of Southern Conference men's basketball champions
