= 1964 Southern Conference men's basketball tournament =

Basketball tournament

- Classification: Division I
- Season: 1963–64
- Teams: 8
- Site: Charlotte Coliseum; Charlotte, NC
- Champions: VMI (1st title)
- Winning coach: Weenie Miller (1st title)

1963–64 Southern Conference men's basketball standings
	Conf.				Overall
Team	W		L	PCT	W		L	PCT
No. 10 Davidson	9	–	2	.818	22	–	4	.846
West Virginia	11	–	3	.786	18	–	10	.643
Virginia Tech	7	–	3	.700	16	–	7	.696
VMI †	7	–	7	.500	12	–	12	.500
Furman	7	–	8	.467	11	–	15	.423
George Washington	5	–	7	.417	11	–	15	.423
William & Mary	5	–	9	.357	9	–	13	.409
The Citadel	4	–	8	.333	11	–	10	.524
Richmond	4	–	12	.250	6	–	16	.273
† Southern Conference Tournament winner Rankings from AP Poll

The 1964 Southern Conference men's basketball tournament took place from February 27 to February 29, 1964, at the original Charlotte Coliseum in Charlotte, North Carolina. The VMI Keydets, led by head coach Weenie Miller, won their first Southern Conference title and received the automatic berth to the 1964 NCAA tournament.

== Format ==
The top eight finishers of the conference's nine members were eligible for the tournament. The teams were seeded based on conference winning percentage. The tournament used a preset bracket consisting of three rounds.

== Bracket ==
Quarterfinals; February 27
1	#7 Davidson	91
8	The Citadel	62
4	VMI	77
5	Furman	73
2	West Virginia	85
7	William & Mary	73
3	Virginia Tech	62
6	George Washington	64

Semifinals; February 28
1	#7 Davidson	81
4	VMI	82
2	West Virginia	80
6	George Washington	88

Finals; February 29
4	VMI	61
6	George Washington	56

* Overtime game

== See also ==
- List of Southern Conference men's basketball champions
