= 1965 Southern Conference men's basketball tournament =

- Classification: Division I
- Season: 1964–65
- Teams: 8
- Site: Charlotte Coliseum; Charlotte, NC
- Champions: West Virginia (9th title)
- Winning coach: George King (3rd title)

1964–65 Southern Conference men's basketball standings
	Conf.				Overall
Team	W		L	PCT	W		L	PCT
No. 6 Davidson	12	–	0	1.000	24	–	2	.923
Virginia Tech	9	–	5	.643	13	–	10	.565
The Citadel	8	–	4	.667	13	–	11	.542
West Virginia †	8	–	6	.571	14	–	15	.483
George Washington	6	–	7	.462	10	–	13	.435
William & Mary	6	–	8	.429	12	–	13	.480
Richmond	6	–	10	.375	10	–	16	.385
VMI	5	–	9	.357	8	–	13	.381
Furman	2	–	13	.133	6	–	19	.240
East Carolina*		–		–	12	–	10	.545
† Tournament winner * – Played as non-major program As of April 30, 1965; Rankings from AP Poll

The 1965 Southern Conference men's basketball tournament took place from February 25–27, 1965 at the original Charlotte Coliseum in Charlotte, North Carolina. The West Virginia Mountaineers, led by head coach George King, won their ninth Southern Conference title and received the automatic berth to the 1965 NCAA tournament.

== Format ==
The top eight finishers of the conference's nine members were eligible for the tournament. Teams were seeded based on conference winning percentage. The tournament used a preset bracket consisting of three rounds.

== Bracket ==
Quarterfinals; February 25
1	#6 Davidson	86
8	VMI	73
4	West Virginia	94
5	George Washington	83
2	Virginia Tech	103
7	Richmond	63
3	The Citadel	60
6	William & Mary	68

Semifinals; February 26
1	#6 Davidson	72
4	West Virginia	74*
2	Virginia Tech	59
6	William & Mary	70

Finals; February 27
4	West Virginia	70**
6	William & Mary	67

* Overtime game

== See also ==
- List of Southern Conference men's basketball champions
