= 1968 Southern Conference men's basketball tournament =

- Classification: Division I
- Season: 1967–68
- Teams: 8
- Site: Charlotte Coliseum; Charlotte, NC
- Champions: Davidson (2nd title)
- Winning coach: Lefty Driesell (2nd title)

1967–68 Southern Conference men's basketball standings
	Conf.				Overall
Team	W		L	PCT	W		L	PCT
No. 8 Davidson †	9	–	1	.900	24	–	5	.828
West Virginia	9	–	2	.818	19	–	9	.679
The Citadel	6	–	5	.545	11	–	14	.440
VMI	8	–	7	.533	9	–	12	.429
Furman	6	–	6	.500	13	–	14	.481
Richmond	8	–	8	.500	12	–	13	.480
East Carolina	6	–	7	.462	9	–	16	.360
William & Mary	4	–	10	.286	6	–	18	.250
George Washington	2	–	12	.143	5	–	19	.208
† 1968 Southern Conference tournament winner Rankings from AP Poll

The 1968 Southern Conference men's basketball tournament took place from February 29 – March 2, 1968, at the original Charlotte Coliseum in Charlotte, North Carolina. The Davidson Wildcats, led by head coach Lefty Driesell, won their second Southern Conference title and received the automatic berth to the 1968 NCAA tournament.

== Format ==
The top eight finishers of the conference's nine members were eligible for the tournament. Teams were seeded based on conference winning percentage. The tournament used a preset bracket consisting of three rounds.

== Bracket ==
Quarterfinals; February 29
1	Davidson	107
8	William & Mary	68
4	VMI	52
5	Furman	62
2	West Virginia	76
7	East Carolina	71
3	The Citadel	88
6	Richmond	100*

Semifinals; March 1
1	Davidson	79
5	Furman	63
2	West Virginia	102
6	Richmond	81

Finals; March 2
1	Davidson	87
2	West Virginia	70

* Overtime game

== See also ==
- List of Southern Conference men's basketball champions
