= Mel Thompson (basketball) =

American basketball player and coach

Biographical details
- Born: October 5, 1932; Richmond, Indiana, U.S.
- Died: February 5, 2009 (aged 76); Indianapolis, Indiana, U.S.

Playing career
- 1951–1954: NC State
- Position: Center

Coaching career (HC unless noted)
- 1959–1960: The Citadel (assistant)
- 1960–1967: The Citadel

Accomplishments and honors

Awards
- First-team All-ACC (1954)

Melvin K. Thompson (October 5, 1932 – February 5, 2009) was an American college basketball player and coach. He was the head coach at The Citadel from 1960 to 1967.

Born and raised in Richmond, Indiana, Thompson played college basketball for Everett Case at North Carolina State University. Following a semi-pro playing career, he was named an assistant coach at The Citadel in 1959, then assumed head coaching duties when Norm Sloan left for the University of Florida coaching job. In his seven seasons as head coach of the Bulldogs, Thompson compiled a record of 67–96. He was fired after an 8–17 season that would become the subject of author Pat Conroy's 2002 memoir My Losing Season, in which Conroy described Thompson as a mentally and emotionally abusive coach, whose unrelenting bullying and negativity undermined the team's ability to function.

Thompson was named to the 1975 'Silver Anniversary Team' by the Indiana Basketball Hall of Fame in recognition of his basketball career. He died on February 5, 2009.

== Head coaching record ==
Record table
Season	Team	Overall	Conference	Standing	Postseason
The Citadel Bulldogs (Southern Conference) (1960–1967)
1960–61	The Citadel	17–8	10–4	3rd	
1961–62	The Citadel	8–15	4–8	7th	
1962–63	The Citadel	3–20	2–10	9th	
1963–64	The Citadel	11–10	4–8	8th	
1964–65	The Citadel	13–11	8–4	3rd	
1965–66	The Citadel	7–16	4–9	8th	
1966–67	The Citadel	8–17	6–7	5th	
The Citadel:		67–98 (.406)	38–50 (.432)		
Total:		67–98 (.406)			
National champion Postseason invitational champion Conference regular season champion Conference regular season and conference tournament champion Division regular season champion Division regular season and conference tournament champion Conference tournament champion
