= 1966 Southern Conference men's basketball tournament =

- Classification: Division I
- Season: 1965–66
- Teams: 8
- Site: Charlotte Coliseum; Charlotte, NC
- Champions: Davidson (1st title)
- Winning coach: Lefty Driesell (1st title)

1965–66 Southern Conference men's basketball standings
	Conf.				Overall
Team	W		L	PCT	W		L	PCT
Davidson †	11	–	1	.917	21	–	7	.750
West Virginia	8	–	2	.800	19	–	9	.679
William & Mary	8	–	3	.727	13	–	12	.520
Richmond	9	–	7	.563	12	–	13	.480
East Carolina	5	–	7	.417	11	–	15	.423
Furman	4	–	8	.333	9	–	17	.346
VMI	5	–	11	.313	5	–	18	.217
The Citadel	4	–	9	.308	7	–	16	.304
George Washington	3	–	9	.250	3	–	18	.143
† Southern Conference Tournament winner Rankings from AP Poll

The 1966 Southern Conference men's basketball tournament took place from February 24–26, 1966 at the original Charlotte Coliseum in Charlotte, North Carolina. The Davidson Wildcats, led by head coach Lefty Driesell, won their first Southern Conference title and received the automatic berth to the 1966 NCAA tournament.

== Format ==
The top eight finishers of the conference's nine members were eligible for the tournament. Teams were seeded based on conference winning percentage. The tournament used a preset bracket consisting of three rounds.

== Bracket ==
Quarterfinals; February 24
1	Davidson	79
8	The Citadel	61
4	Richmond	76
5	East Carolina	74
2	West Virginia	95
7	VMI	80
3	William & Mary	78
6	Furman	73

Semifinals; February 25
1	Davidson	85
4	Richmond	65
2	West Virginia	64
3	William & Mary	50

Finals; February 26
1	Davidson	80
2	West Virginia	69

* Overtime game

== See also ==
- List of Southern Conference men's basketball champions
