= 1969 Southern Conference men's basketball tournament =

- Classification: Division I
- Season: 1968–69
- Teams: 8
- Site: Charlotte Coliseum; Charlotte, NC
- Champions: Davidson (3rd title)
- Winning coach: Lefty Driesell (3rd title)

1968–69 Southern Conference men's basketball standings
	Conf.				Overall
Team	W		L	PCT	W		L	PCT
No. 5 Davidson †	9	–	0	1.000	27	–	3	.900
East Carolina	9	–	2	.818	17	–	11	.607
George Washington	7	–	5	.583	14	–	11	.560
Richmond	6	–	7	.462	13	–	14	.481
Furman	5	–	6	.455	9	–	17	.346
The Citadel	5	–	8	.385	13	–	12	.520
William & Mary	3	–	8	.273	6	–	20	.231
VMI	3	–	11	.214	5	–	18	.217
† 1969 Southern Conference tournament winner Rankings from AP Poll

The 1969 Southern Conference men's basketball tournament took place from February 27 to March 1, 1969, at the original Charlotte Coliseum in Charlotte, North Carolina. The Davidson Wildcats, led by head coach Lefty Driesell, won their third Southern Conference title and received the automatic berth to the 1969 NCAA tournament.

== Format ==
All of the conference's eight members were eligible for the tournament. Teams were seeded based on conference winning percentage. The tournament used a preset bracket consisting of three rounds.

== Bracket ==
Quarterfinals; February 27
1	#5 Davidson	99
8	VMI	75
4	Richmond	66
5	Furman	64
2	East Carolina	48
7	William & Mary	35
3	George Washington	90
6	The Citadel	73

Semifinals; February 28
1	#5 Davidson	97
4	Richmond	83
2	East Carolina	84
3	George Washington	79

Finals; March 1
1	#5 Davidson	102
2	East Carolina	76

* Overtime game

== See also ==
- List of Southern Conference men's basketball champions
