= Tully Gymnasium =

Arena in Tallahassee, Florida

Coordinates: 30.442538°N 84.302053°W

Lucy McDaniel Court at Robert Tully Gym
- Tully Gymnasium
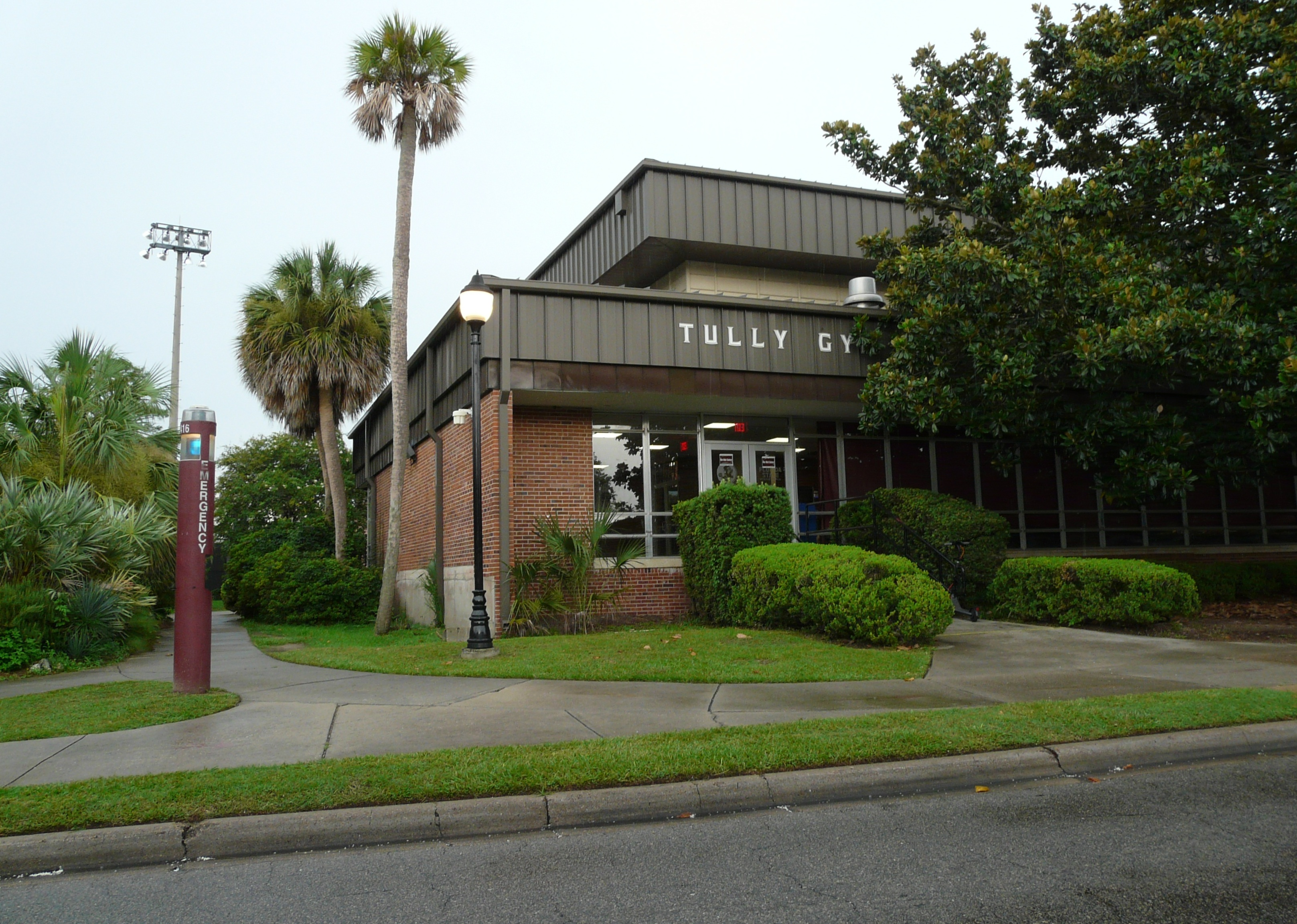
- Interactive map of Lucy McDaniel Court at Robert Tully Gym
- Location: 139 Chieftan Way
- Owner: Florida State University
- Operator: Florida State Athletics
- Capacity: 1,162 2,500
- Surface: Taraflex

Construction
- Opened: 1956

Tenant
- Florida State Seminoles volleyball (NCAA)

The Bobby Tully Gymnasium (in full Lucy McDaniel Court at Robert Tully Gym) is a multi-purpose arena at Florida State University in Tallahassee, Florida that serves as the home for the Lady Seminoles volleyball team and offices of the student recreation department. A million-dollar donation in the late 1990s paid for a renovation that included lighting and armchair seating (which reduced capacity by half). The locker rooms were renovated in 2011 and a Taraflex floor was installed in 2022.

== History ==
=== Teams ===
The building was constructed and opened in 1956 as the venue for Men's basketball and gymnastics, followed by women's basketball. At the time, a gym with 4,200 bleacher-style seats was considered large. The women’s volleyball team began competing in 1973 and the gym was referred to as "Tiny Tully". When the Donald L. Tucker Civic Center opened in 1981, men's basketball moved there, followed by women's basketball in 1995.

=== Namesake ===
The gym was named for Robert Henry Tully. At 24, he was the first FSU varsity athlete to pass away. Bobby was a World War II veteran who played football, was an Alpha Tau Omega brother and member of Omicron Delta Kappa and Gold Key societies. He graduated in 1952 and died in 1954 after a lingering illness. His brother Jim was a real estate agent who helped found Capital Regional Medical Center; older brother Jack was the 1947 captain of FSU's first football team. His mother Winnie was the first juvenile officer in Leon County from 1942-1971.

Lucy McDaniel was the first woman to donate over $1 million to women’s athletics. FSU dedicated the Tully Gym floor to McDaniel in a November 2, 2000 ceremony. It is officially the Lucy McDaniel Volleyball Court at Tully Gymnasium.

=== Other uses ===
The arena played host to numerous concerts including the Rolling Thunder Revue Tour on April 27, 1976, headed by Bob Dylan. It is home to the Seminole Dance Force. The gym has also hosted a Big Shots Basketball Tournament, the Gym Force Gymnastics Championships, the first and second rounds of the 2009 NCAA Volleyball tournament, Tallahassee Indoor Archery Shoot, and an AAU Gymnastics Qualifier competition.

== See also ==
- Florida State Seminoles
