= Norfolk Municipal Auditorium =

Arena in Norfolk, Virginia

- Norfolk Arena
- Interactive map of Norfolk Municipal Auditorium
- Coordinates: 36°51′30″N 76°17′23″W
- Owner: City of Norfolk
- Operator: City of Norfolk
- Capacity: 3,000

Construction
- Opened: 1943
- Closed: 1993
- Cost: $543,000

Tenant
- William & Mary Indians (alternate)

Norfolk Municipal Auditorium was a 5,200 seat multi-purpose arena and music venue in Norfolk, Virginia, United States that opened in May 1943. The arena was constructed after the City of Norfolk and the military found a need to construct an entertainment venue in the city after the population of the city doubled between 1938 and 1941 as a result of World War II-related military buildup.

The building remains standing but has been converted into a storage and administrative facility for the adjoining Harrison Opera House.

== History ==
=== Construction ===
The building was constructed with combined funds from the City of Norfolk, who gave $245,000, and the Military, who allocated $278,000 from the Federal War Fund. The building, designed by architect Clarence Neff, contained a 3,000-person auditorium and sports arena and a 1,800-person theater.

The City of Norfolk took full ownership of the facility in 1947.

=== Operation ===
The venue was host to a large variety of events: trade shows, conventions, industry events, concerts, high school and college graduations, plays, and the television studios of the predecessor to WTKR. Elvis Presley was one prominent act to play at the Norfolk Auditorium.

The venue also served as the alternate home to the William & Mary Indians basketball team; the Indians (now known as the Tribe) usually played one or two home games a year in Norfolk (away from their usual home at Blow Gymnasium in Williamsburg).

=== Decline and renovation ===
The building began to fall out of use with the opening of the modern Norfolk Scope Arena in 1971. William & Mary stopped playing games in Norfolk and Old Dominion University (formerly known as the College of William and Mary in Norfolk) began playing its basketball games at the ODU Fieldhouse on its campus.

Nonetheless, the building saw a massive renovation in 1993 in order for the Virginia Opera, which was founded in 1974 by a group of community leaders organized by Edythe Harrison, to make use of the auditorium's Center Theater. The renovation, which cost around $10 million, added "a dynamic new facade, a three story grand lobby with floor to ceiling windows, glittering chandeliers, and an enclosed elegant staircase to the grand foyer and balcony levels." The theater-portion of the theater, with a new seating capacity of 1,632, was henceforth known as the Harrison Opera House.

=== Current status ===
The old gymnasium and arena, which is still visibly attached to the back of the renovated Opera House, is no longer in use and now serves as a storage and construction area for the Virginia Opera as well as the location for the Opera's administrative offices.

== See also ==
- Met Park
