= Stansbury Hall (West Virginia University) =

Building on the Downtown Campus of West Virginia University

Coordinates: 39°38′05.9″N 79°57′23.5″W

- Interactive map of Stansbury Hall
- Former names: WVU Field House
- Location: Beechurst Ave; Morgantown, WV 26506
- Owner: West Virginia University
- Operator: West Virginia University
- Capacity: 6,000

Construction
- Opened: 1928
- Closed: 1970 as arena; 2019 as an academic building
- Demolished: 2019
- Cost: $250,000

Tenant
- West Virginia Mountaineers (NCAA) (1929–1970)

Stansbury Hall was a building on the Downtown Campus of West Virginia University. It was named after Harry Stansbury (died 1966), a former WVU Athletic Director. Opened in 1929 as the WVU Field House, just to the southwest of "Old" Mountaineer Field, this was the home of WVU basketball until 1970, when the WVU Coliseum was opened. This was the home floor during the days of Hot Rod Hundley and Jerry West. It hosted the Southern Conference men's basketball tournament in 1953. While the home venue of WVU basketball, the team compiled a record of 370–81 (.820) when playing there. In October 1973, it was renamed to honor Stansbury.

Prior to demolition, the building was the home of the Philosophy Department, the Statistics Department, the Program for Humanities, the Program for Religious Studies, the Center for Service and Learning, and the Office of International Programs. Army and Air Force ROTC programs were also housed here. Stansbury's use prior to demolition also retained some vestige of its athletic history; the remaining arena floor was often used by intramural and "pickup" soccer and basketball games, while a gymnasium offering personal-training services was housed elsewhere in the building.

On February 10, 2017, WVU announced plans to demolish Stansbury Hall and replace it with a new building for the WVU College of Business and Economics.

Demolition began August 2019. The building to take its place, Reynolds Hall, was opened June at the beginning of the 2022-23 academic year, and hosts WVU's John Chambers Business and Economics College.
