= Blow Hall =

College of William & Mary building

Blow Gymnasium
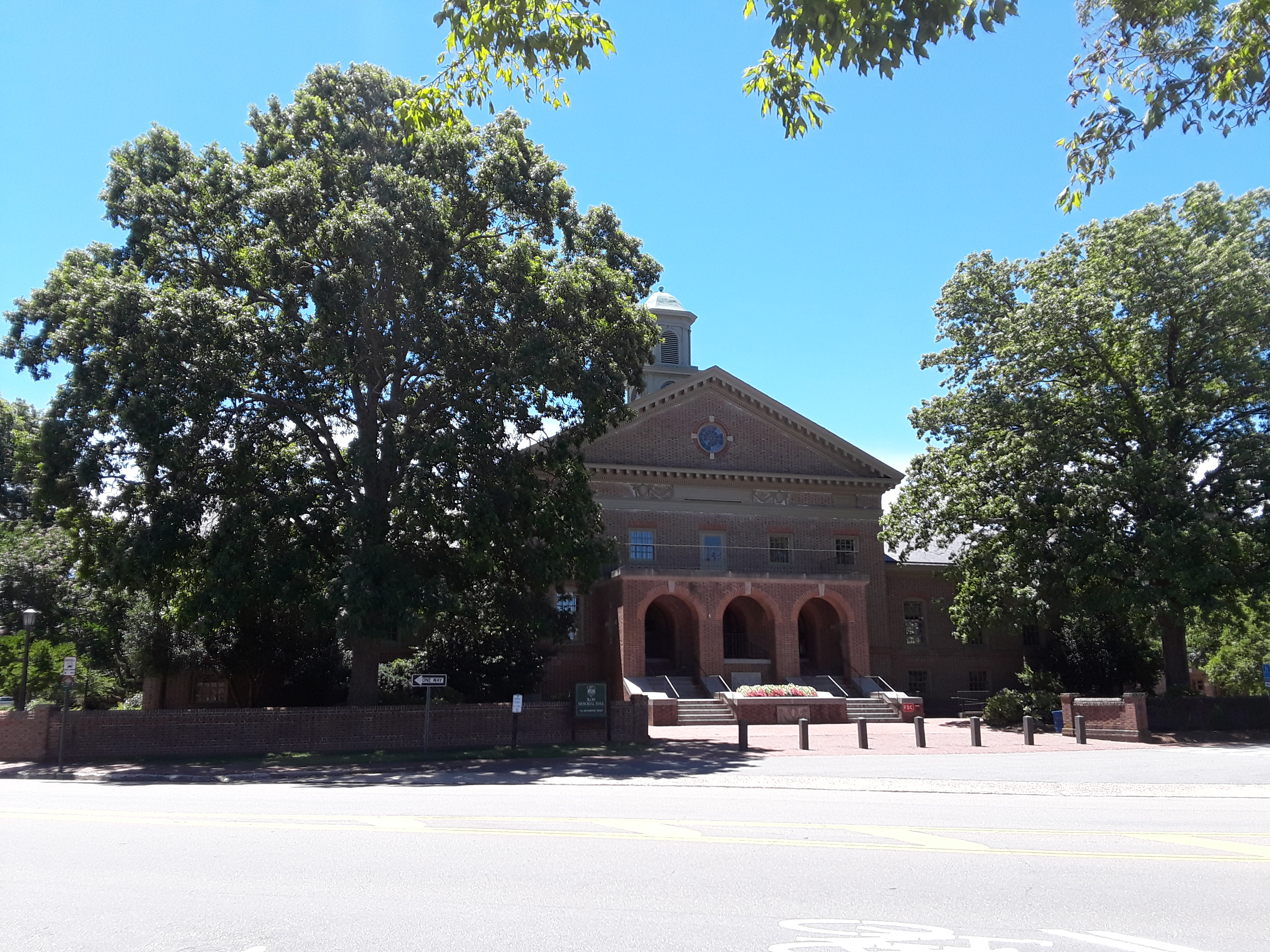
- The front of Blow Memorial Hall, July 2018

General information
- Architectural style: Georgian
- Location: Williamsburg, Virginia, 262 Richmond Road
- Current tenants: Academic classrooms and offices
- Construction started: 1923
- Completed: 1925
- Owner: College of William & Mary

The Blow Hall, formerly George Preston Blow Gymnasium, is a building on the campus of the College of William & Mary. It was the second gymnasium used by the College of William & Mary for the men's basketball team. The building, which was constructed from 1923 to 1925 with an expansion in the early 1950s, was used as the school's men's physical education center and basketball arena until the 1970–1971 season when William & Mary Hall opened. Women's athletics moved to Adair Gymnasium when it opened in 1963, where women's basketball games and other indoor sports were played through the 1980s. Blow Gym continued to be used for physical education classes and as a recreation center for students and staff until its renovation in 1991, when it was rededicated as Blow Memorial Hall.

The building was named for Captain George Preston Blow whose wife, Adele Matthiessen Blow, donated a gift of $130,200 to William and Mary in memory of her husband. It is now used to house the offices of the bursar and registrar as well as academic classrooms and offices. It also contains a large reception room.
