= Cormack Field House =

Military sports facility in Lexington, Virginia

Coordinates: 37°47′21″N 79°25′53″W

Cormack Field House ("The Pit")
- Interactive map of Cormack Field House ("The Pit")
- Location: Lexington, Virginia

Construction
- Opened: 1930s (renamed in 1986)

Tenants
- VMI (Track and Field)

Cormack Field House or "The Pit" is the track and field facility for the Virginia Military Institute (VMI) Keydets, located in Lexington, Virginia. It was VMI's home for basketball until 1981, when Cameron Hall was completed as the new VMI basketball arena. Cormack Field House is named after Walt Cormack, a VMI track coach for twenty-five years and who also started the "Winter Relays".
