= Greenville Memorial Auditorium =

Former arena in Greenville, South Carolina

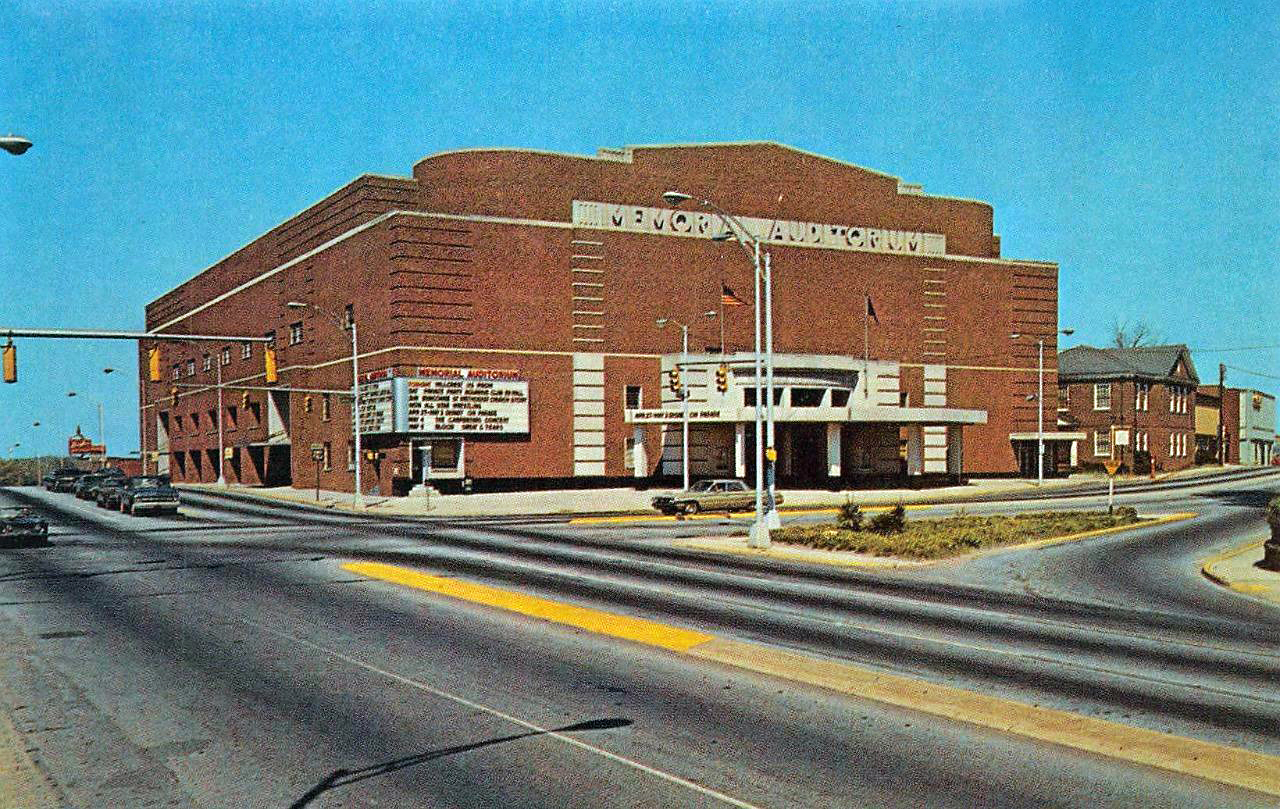
- Interactive map of Greenville Memorial Auditorium
- Location: 401 E North St Greenville, South Carolina 29601
- Coordinates: 34°51′06.9″N 82°23′38.8″W
- Capacity: 7,500 Seated 10,000 SRO

Construction
- Opened: December 1, 1958
- Closed: August 30, 1996
- Demolished: September 20, 1997

Greenville Memorial Auditorium was a 7,500-seat multi-purpose arena built in 1958 that was located in Greenville, South Carolina. It hosted local sporting events, concerts and the Ringling Brothers Circus until the Bon Secours Wellness Arena opened in 1998.

It hosted professional wrestling throughout its history, especially in the 1970s and 1980s, with NWA Jim Crockett Promotions cards held every Monday night.

It hosted the Southern Conference men's basketball tournaments in 1972, 1975, and 1976.

Lynyrd Skynyrd performed there on October 19, 1977, the last concert played by the original band prior to its fatal plane crash that took three of its members the next day en route to Baton Rouge, Louisiana.

The arena's successor, the BI-LO Center (later named the Bon Secours Wellness Arena), was built adjacent to the stadium and opened on September 3, 1998. The Greenville Memorial Auditorium was demolished on September 20, 1997.
