= Richmond Arena =

Sports venue in Richmond, Virginia, United States

Coordinates: 37.569855°N 77.462411°W

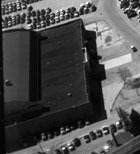
- Richmond Arena in 1955, aerial view
- Interactive map of Richmond Arena
- Location: Hermitage Rd; Richmond, VA 23173
- Owner: City of Richmond
- Capacity: 4,252 permanent seats 900 temporary bleacher seats

Construction
- Groundbreaking: 1906
- Opened: 1908
- Closed: 1986
- Demolished: 1997

Tenants
- Richmond Spiders (men's basketball, 1954–1971); Virginia Squires (ABA) 1970–1971

The Richmond Arena was a multipurpose indoor sports facility located in and owned by the city of Richmond, Virginia. It was located south of Parker Field, between Boulevard and Hermitage Road.

The barrel-vaulted arena originally was opened in 1908 as an exhibition hall and the administrative offices of the State Fair of Virginia, which was originally held at the location. After World War II, however, the State Fair moved and the hall, which had been used as a motor pool garage for the Army during the war, was turned over to the city and used as a city garage. By this time, the University of Richmond was looking for an arena to host its basketball program. No other arena in the city held more than 2,000 spectators, and the university wished for a larger venue. It was the idea of Clyde Ratcliffe, son of the former head of the State Fair, to turn the exhibition hall into an arena. The first sporting event held in the hall was a Richmond Spiders men's basketball game against the VMI Keydets.

It served as the site of basketball games for the Spiders from 1954 through 1971, and was a "regional" home of the Virginia Squires of the American Basketball Association during their first year in the Commonwealth. It also served as the site of the Southern Conference men's basketball championship tournament from 1955 through 1963. In addition to basketball, the 5,152-seat arena also played host to numerous exhibitions, concerts and professional wrestling and boxing events. The largest crowd to ever see an event in the building was 6,022 for a Harlem Globetrotters game in 1955.

The building, which had no insulation or cooling system, fell out of popular use after the opening of the much larger Richmond Coliseum in 1971. The building still held wrestling matches until 1977, when a promoter change led to wrestling matches being moved to the Coliseum. After a Hertz automobile sale in 1986, the arena finally closed. It remained shuttered and unused until being demolished in 1997. The land was given to Virginia Commonwealth University, and in 1999 Sports Backers Stadium was built on its site. One of the Arena's vice-presidents, E. Claiborne Robins, would lend his name to the eventual on-campus arena of the Spiders as a benefactor.
