= NBA–ABA All-Star Game =

Interleague exhibition basketball games

The NBA–ABA All-Star Game was an exhibition basketball match organized by the players associations of the National Basketball Association (NBA) and American Basketball Association (ABA) in which a selection of the best players from each league played in a game against each other. The players organized the all-star game against the wishes of the owners, who refused any interleague play without a merger of the leagues. Billed as a "Supergame", it was held in 1971 and 1972. Another game was originally scheduled to be played in 1974, until the NBA won a binding arbitration blocking their players from participating.

== Background ==
After a costly four-year battle between the NBA and ABA, the two leagues agreed on May 7, 1971, to pursue Congressional approval to allow the merger of the two rivals. They also agreed to permit preseason games between the leagues in the upcoming fall. Days later, the players responded by organizing the all-star game without consent from the owners or consulting with either league commissioner. Teams from the two leagues had never played each other before. Some proceeds from the game went to charity and some to the players' pension fund.

National Basketball Players Association (NBPA) president Oscar Robertson said that the all-star game would show that the two leagues could play against each other without an "illegal merger". The players associations opposed a merger, as they would lose another potential employer. In April 1970, the NBPA had filed the lawsuit Robertson v. National Basketball Ass'n to prevent the leagues from merging due to antitrust arguments. Four months after the first all-star game in 1971, NBA and ABA teams started playing preseason exhibition games against each other.

== Games ==
=== 1971 ===
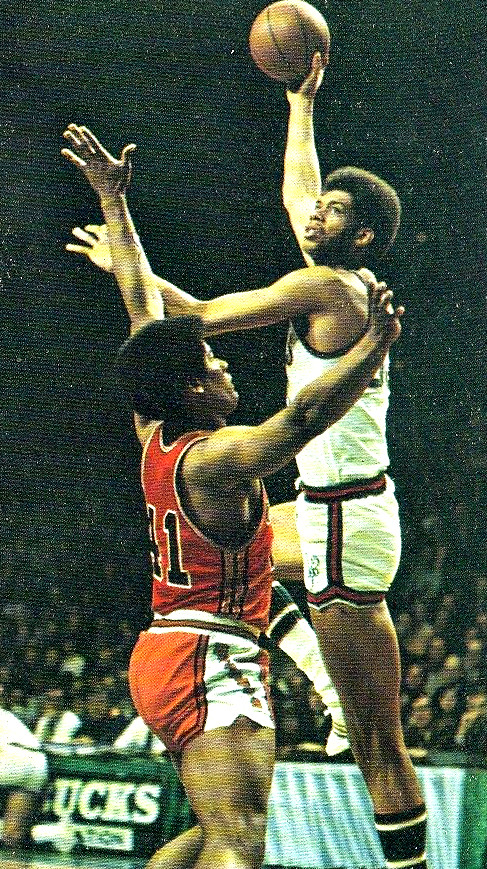
Lew Alcindor (right), later known as Kareem Abdul-Jabbar, did not play for the NBA after getting married earlier in the day.

On May 28, 1971, the first interleague all-star game between the best players of both American professional leagues was held. It was played at the Houston Astrodome with a crowd of 16,364. The NBA team, coached by Bill Russell, won 125–120 in a very competitive match against Larry Brown's ABA team. The NBA's Walt Frazier scored a game-high 26 points on 11-of-16 shooting and was named the game's most valuable player (MVP).

The game was played with a mixture of rules from both leagues. In the first half, the NBA's 24-second shot clock and its conventional ball were used. The shot clock changed in the second half to the ABA's 30 seconds, when the ABA's red-white-and-blue ball and three-point field goal were also in effect.

Nine out of ten NBA players that participated in that match were later named among the 50 Greatest Players in NBA History: Frazier, John Havlicek, Dave DeBusschere, Nate Thurmond, Oscar Robertson, Dave Bing, Elvin Hayes, Earl Monroe, Billy Cunningham. Only Lou Hudson would miss out on joining the 50 Greatest Players in NBA History from that roster, though he would still make it to the Naismith Basketball Hall of Fame alongside the rest of the NBA team's players and five of the ABA team's players. Kareem Abdul-Jabbar was originally scheduled to play in the game, even though he was getting married earlier in the day, but changed his mind after the wedding. His absence made the game more competitive.

The NBA objected to the game, but no fines or suspensions of players were reported. Astrodome publicity director Wayne Chandler said he unofficially heard that "the owners will not raise a hand to help. But on the other hand, they are not trying to prevent the game from being played." According to Sports Illustrated, Kentucky Colonels' management reportedly dissuaded their player Dan Issel from playing. The game was televised nationally by independent network Television Sports on about 200 stations.

The following month on June 20, most of the same players participated in the nationally televised Martin Luther King Jr. Benefit Game in Indianapolis. The contest was organized as an East–West game, with NBA and ABA players teaming together on each side, played with ABA rules. Originally announced in April, the game was sponsored by Black Expo, with proceeds going to the Southern Christian Leadership Conference for the Martin King Jr. benefit fund. In front of 6,078 spectators, the West won 111–100. The East's John Brisker scoring a game-high 21 points and Connie Hawkins of the West named the MVP.

Date: May 28, 1971

Arena: Houston Astrodome

Place: Houston, Texas

Attendance: 16,364

Final: NBA – ABA 125–120

MVP: Walt Frazier, New York Knicks

	1	2	3	4	TOT
NBA	33	33	25	34	125
ABA	33	31	25	31	120

*	Elected to Naismith Memorial Basketball Hall of Fame

NBA

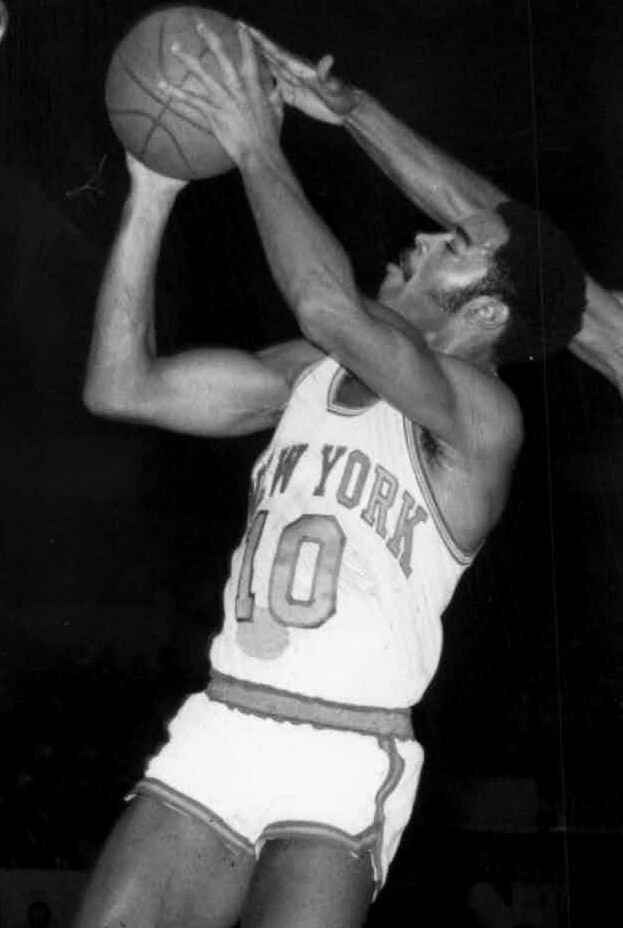
The NBA's Walt Frazier scored a game-high 26 points and was named the game's MVP.

Player	2FG	FT	3P	PF	PTS
John Havlicek*	3/7	4/7	0/0	4	10
Dave DeBusschere*	6/14	5/5	0/0	5	17
Nate Thurmond*	1/5	1/5	0/0	1	3
Oscar Robertson*	4/9	9/14	0/0	1	17
Dave Bing*	2/5	7/12	0/0	2	11
Walt Frazier*	11/16	4/5	0/0	2	26
Elvin Hayes*	8/20	1/5	0/0	4	17
Earl Monroe*	2/5	8/9	0/0	1	12
Lou Hudson*	2/6	3/3	0/0	4	7
Billy Cunningham*	1/5	3/5	0/0	3	5
TOTAL	40/92	45/70	0/0	27	125
	43.5%	64.3%	0.0%		

NBA coach: Bill Russell

ABA

Player	2FG	FT	3P	PF	PTS
Rick Barry*	7/17	6/10	0/1	5	20
Willie Wise	6/13	4/5	0/0	3	16
Zelmo Beaty*	3/5	4/6	0/0	3	10
Larry Jones	6/10	0/0	1/1	6	15
Charlie Scott*	5/12	1/3	0/4	2	11
Mel Daniels*	5/12	5/7	0/0	1	15
John Brisker	1/5	6/6	2/3	3	14
Roger Brown*	3/5	3/5	0/1	2	9
Steve Jones	1/3	1/3	1/1	5	6
Donnie Freeman	2/6	0/0	0/0	3	4
Bill Melchionni	0/1	0/0	0/0	3	0
TOTAL	39/89	30/45	4/11	36	120
	43.8%	66.7%	36.4%		

ABA coach: Larry Brown

=== 1972 ===
On May 25, 1972, the second match was played at Nassau Coliseum with a crowd of 14,086 people. The NBA team (that had players like Wilt Chamberlain and Oscar Robertson) won 106–104, overcoming a 19-point deficit. The different numbers of free-throws between the two teams conceded by the NBA's referee in both games was decisive: 70–45 in the first match and 47–32 in the second. The NBA's Bob Lanier, who was a late replacement for Abdul-Jabbar, scored 15 points, had seven rebounds, and was named the MVP.

The all-stars were voted for by players in each league. Game rules were blended again. The NBA's ball was used in the first half and the ABA's in the second. The NBA's 24-second shot clock was used for the game, as was the ABA's 3-pointers. The game was again televised by Television Sports. Some NBA players did not participate because the league threatened them with fines and suspensions. Conversely, ABA owners and their commissioner, Jack Dolph, supported the game. In June, NBA owners unanimously authorized fines for each NBA participant who was unauthorized to play in the game. The fine matched the amount each player earned in the game, $3,300. Only Connie Hawkins and Paul Silas had received permission from their team, the Phoenix Suns. The NBPA voted to strike if the league followed through on collection.

John Havlicek and Oscar Robertson were the only two players that appeared in both matches for NBA squad, while for ABA team They were Rick Barry, Donnie Freeman, Willie Wise, Roger Brown and Mel Daniels.

Date: May 25, 1972

Arena: Nassau Coliseum

Place: Uniondale, New York

Attendance: 14,086

Final: NBA – ABA 106–104

MVP: Bob Lanier, Detroit Pistons

	1	2	3	4	TOT
NBA	21	29	33	23	106
ABA	30	26	25	23	104

*	Elected to Naismith Memorial Basketball Hall of Fame

NBA

Player	FG	FT	3P	PF	PTS
John Havlicek*	5	7/9			17
Connie Hawkins*	2	2/6			6
Wilt Chamberlain*	2	2/4			6
Oscar Robertson*	5	4/4			14
Archie Clark	5	5/7			15
Bob Lanier*	7	1/4			15
Nate Archibald*	4	4/6			12
Bob Love	4	2/2			10
Gail Goodrich*	3	2/3			8
Paul Silas	1	1/2			3
TOTAL	38	30/47		27	106
		63.8%			

NBA coach: Elgin Baylor

ABA

Player	FG	FT	3P	PF	PTS
Rick Barry*	4	2/2	1		11
Dan Issel*	4	0/0			8
Artis Gilmore*	7	0/5			14
Jimmy Jones	3	1/2			7
Donnie Freeman	5	6/7			16
Julius Erving*	5	3/4			13
Ralph Simpson	5	2/4			12
Willie Wise	4	4/5			12
George Thompson	2	3/3			7
Roger Brown*	1	0/0			2
Mel Daniels*	1	0/0			2
TOTAL	41	21/32		32	104
		65.6%			

ABA coach: Al Bianchi

=== 1974 ===
A third all-star game was scheduled for May 18, 1974, at the Providence Civic Auditorium in Providence, Rhode Island, to be televised on ABC's Wide World of Sports. The network had been the league's broadcaster from 1964 until 1973, when CBS was awarded the NBA contract. The all-star game was cancelled when the NBA owners won a binding arbitration blocking their players from taking part. Larry Fleisher, who was the NBPA's general counsel, believed that television considerations led to the NBA's block, with CBS being unhappy that the game was to be on ABC.

== See also ==
- ABA All-Star Game
- NBA All-Star Game
- ABA–NBA merger
