= Mae Alice Engron =

American artist (1933–2007)

- Born: January 29, 1933; Indianapolis, Indiana
- Died: May 4, 2007 (aged 74); Indianapolis, Indiana
- Education: Herron School of Art
- Known for: Abstract Art
- Parents: Reuben Starks (father); Hattie Starks (mother)

Mae Alice Engron (January 29, 1933 – May 4, 2007) was an American artist known for her oil paintings and one of few Black abstract artists in the 20th century.

== Personal life ==
Alice Engron was born to Reuben and Hattie Starks in Indianapolis, Indiana on January 29, 1933. After attending Indianapolis Public Schools, she went on to work for the U.S. Postal Service where she was injured. This caused her to attend Herron School of Art, where she graduated in 1984.

== Career ==
She showed her work in a number of Indiana-based exhibit galleries such as the Indiana State Museum, and Indiana Black Expo, as well as galleries such as Quotidian in Los Angeles. Her work was also acquired by the Fort Wayne Museum of Art and the Smithsonian American Art Museum. Alice Engron was both an abstract artist and a neo-Expressionist. Through her oil paintings, she focused on incorporating brushstroke texture, unique colors, and organic forms found in nature.

== Work ==
- Mystic Bird (1988), Smithsonian American Art Museum
- Untitled, Fort Wayne Museum of Art
