= 1967–68 UCLA Bruins men's basketball team =

American college basketball season

1967–68 UCLA Bruins men's basketball

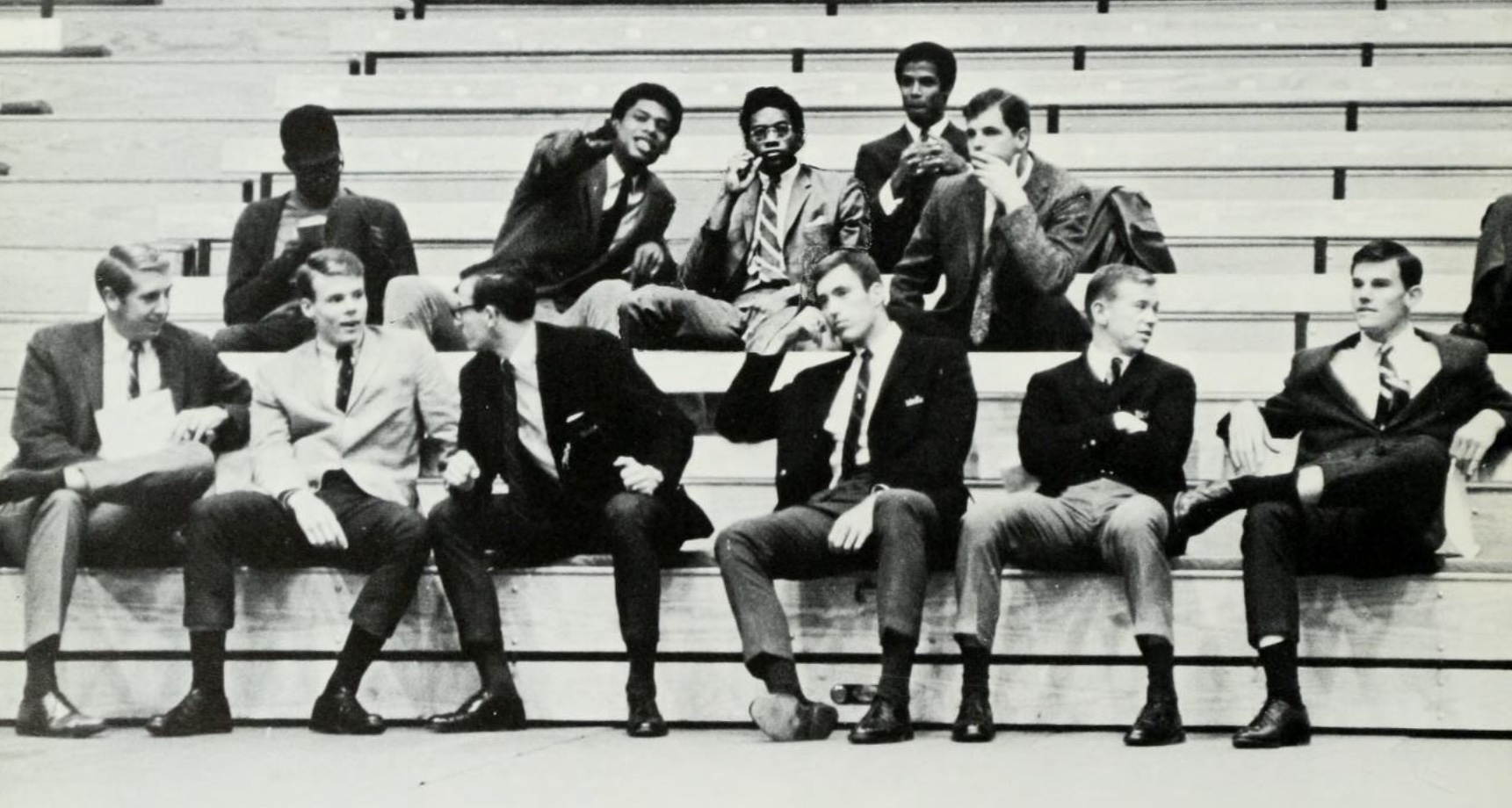
- From the 1968 UCLA yearbook

NCAA tournament National champions AAWU regular season champions

National Championship Game, W 78–55 vs. North Carolina
- Conference: Athletic Association of Western Universities

Ranking
- Coaches: No. 2
- AP: No. 2
- Record: 29–1 (14–0 Pac-8)
- Head coach: John Wooden (20th season)
- Assistant coach: Jerry Norman

1967–68 AAWU Conference men's basketball standings
	Conf.				Overall
Team	W		L	PCT	W		L	PCT
No. 2 UCLA	14	–	0	1.000	29	–	1	.967
USC	11	–	3	.786	18	–	8	.692
Washington State	8	–	6	.571	16	–	9	.640
California	7	–	7	.500	16	–	9	.640
Oregon State	5	–	9	.357	12	–	13	.480
Stanford	5	–	9	.357	11	–	15	.423
Washington	4	–	10	.286	12	–	14	.462
Oregon	2	–	12	.143	7	–	19	.269
Rankings from AP Poll

The 1967–68 UCLA Bruins men's basketball team won a second consecutive NCAA national championship, the fourth in five years under head coach John Wooden, with a win over North Carolina.

UCLA's 47-game winning streak came to an end in January when they were beaten by Houston and All-American Elvin Hayes in the Astrodome 71–69; the game was known as the Game of the Century. The Bruins avenged the loss in a rematch with Houston in the NCAA Final Four, by beating the Cougars 101–69 to become the only team to win consecutive NCAA championships twice.

The Bruins topped the century mark (100 points) in 23 of 30 games, averaged 108.8 points a game and gave up only 64.5 per game.

== Season summary ==
This team ushered in a new era of college hoops when it played and lost to Houston in a regular-season game at Houston Astrodome that was seen by a national television audience. The Bruins avenged the only loss in the Final Four, thrashing the Cougars behind Lew Alcindor's 19 points and 18 rebounds. "Big Lew" was even more dominant in the title game, with 34 points and 16 boards in a win over North Carolina. UCLA limited Houston's Elvin Hayes, who was averaging 37.7 points per game but was held to only 10. Bruins coach John Wooden credited his assistant, Jerry Norman, for devising the diamond-and-one defense that contained Hayes.

== Players ==
1967–68 UCLA Bruins men's basketball team
Players
Coaches

Pos.	#	Name	Height	Weight	Year	Hometown
C	33	Lew Alcindor	7 ft 2 in (2.18 m)	225 lb (102 kg)	Jr	New York, New York
G	42	Lucius Allen	6 ft 2 in (1.88 m)	175 lb (79 kg)	Jr	Kansas City, KS
G	22	Kenny Heitz	6 ft 3 in (1.91 m)	—	Jr	Santa Maria, CA
F	54	Edgar Lacey	6 ft 6 in (1.98 m)	—	Sr	Los Angeles, California
F	35	Mike Lynn	6 ft 7 in (2.01 m)	—	Sr	Covina, California
F	34	Jim Nielsen	—	—
C	30	Neville Saner	6 ft 6 in (1.98 m)	—
F	53	Lynn Shackelford	6 ft 5 in (1.96 m)	190 lb (86 kg)	Jr	Burbank, CA
G	24	Gene Sutherland	6 ft 1 in (1.85 m)	—
G	45	Bill Sweek	6 ft 3 in (1.91 m)	—	Jr	Pasadena, CA
G	44	Michael Warren	5 ft 11 in (1.8 m)	—	Sr	South Bend, IN

Head coach

John Wooden (Purdue)

Assistant coach(es)

- Jerry Norman

Legend

- (C) Team captain
- (S) Suspended
- (I) Ineligible
- (W) Walk-on
- Injured
- Current redshirt

Roster

Lew Alcindor would suffer the first major injury of his athletic career. He suffered a scratched left cornea on January 12, 1968, in a game against the California Golden Bears. He got struck by Ted Henderson of Cal in a rebound battle. He would miss the next two games against Stanford and Portland. This happened right before the game against the University of Houston.

== Schedule ==
Date time, TV	Rank^{#}	Opponent^{#}	Result	Record	Site city, state
Regular Season
December 2, 1967*	No. 1	at Purdue	W 116-71	1-0	Purdue Arena; West Lafayette, IN
December 8, 1967*	No. 1	Wichita State	W 133-86	2-0	Pauley Pavilion; Los Angeles, CA
December 9, 1967*; 8:00 pm, KTLA (delay)	No. 1	Iowa State	W 131-70	3-0	Pauley Pavilion; Los Angeles, CA
December 22, 1967*	No. 1	No. 10 Bradley	W 129-63	4-0	Pauley Pavilion; Los Angeles, CA
December 23, 1967*	No. 1	Notre Dame	W 134-63	5-0	Pauley Pavilion; Los Angeles, CA
December 27, 1967*	No. 1	Minnesota; Los Angeles Classic	W 115-55	6-0	Los Angeles Memorial Sports Arena; Los Angeles, CA
December 29, 1967*	No. 1	Saint Louis; Los Angeles Classic	W 122-67	7-0	Los Angeles Memorial Sports Arena; Los Angeles, CA
December 30, 1967*	No. 1	Wyoming; Los Angeles Classic	W 108-71	8-0	Los Angeles Memorial Sports Arena; Los Angeles, CA
January 5, 1968	No. 1	Washington State	W 107-79	9-0 (1-0)	Pauley Pavilion; Los Angeles, CA
January 6, 1968	No. 1	Washington	W 103-65	10-0 (2-0)	Pauley Pavilion; Los Angeles, CA
January 12, 1968	No. 1	at California	W 104-64	11-0 (3-0)	Harmon Gym; Berkeley, CA
January 13, 1968	No. 1	at Stanford	W 123-63	12-0 (4-0)	Stanford Pavilion; Stanford, CA
January 18, 1968*	No. 1	Portland	W 93-59	13-0	Pauley Pavilion; Los Angeles, CA
January 20, 1968*; TVS	No. 1	vs. No. 2 Houston; Game of the Century	L 69-71	13-1	Houston Astrodome (52,693); Houston, TX
January 26, 1968*	No. 2	vs. Holy Cross	W 100-67	14-1	Madison Square Garden (18,106); New York, NY
January 27, 1968*	No. 2	vs. Boston College	W 94-77	15-1	Madison Square Garden (18,499); New York, NY
February 3, 1968	No. 2	USC	W 121-67	16-1 (5-0)	Pauley Pavilion; Los Angeles, CA
February 9, 1968	No. 2	at Oregon State	W 85-42	17-1 (6-0)	Gill Coliseum; Corvallis, OR
February 10, 1968	No. 2	at Oregon	W 114-63	18-1 (7-0)	McArthur Court; Eugene, OR
February 16, 1968	No. 2	Oregon	W 139-58	19-1 (8-0)	Pauley Pavilion; Los Angeles, CA
February 17, 1968	No. 2	Oregon State	W 108-71	20-1 (9-0)	Pauley Pavilion; Los Angeles, CA
February 24, 1968	No. 2	at Washington	W 104-67	21-1 (10-0)	Hec Edmundson Pavilion; Seattle, WA
February 26, 1968	No. 2	at Washington State	W 111-70	22-1 (11-0)	Bohler Gymnasium; Pullman, WA
March 1, 1968	No. 2	Stanford	W 140-62	23-1 (12-0)	Pauley Pavilion; Los Angeles, CA
March 2, 1968	No. 2	California	W 115-61	24-1 (13-0)	Pauley Pavilion; Los Angeles, CA
March 9, 1968	No. 2	at USC	W 72-44	25-1 (14-0)	Los Angeles Memorial Sports Arena; Los Angeles, CA
NCAA Tournament
March 15, 1968*	No. 2	vs. New Mexico State; Regional semifinal	W 88-49	26-1	University Arena; Albuquerque, NM
March 16, 1968*	No. 2	vs. Santa Clara; Regional Final	W 107-66	27-1	University Arena; Albuquerque, NM
March 22, 1968*	No. 2	vs. No. 1 Houston; National semifinal	W 101-69	28-1	Los Angeles Sports Arena; Los Angeles, CA
March 23, 1968*	No. 2	vs. No. 5 North Carolina; National Final	W 78-55	29-1	Los Angeles Sports Arena; Los Angeles, CA
*Non-conference game. ^{#}Rankings from AP Poll. (#) Tournament seedings in parentheses. All times are in Pacific time.

== Rankings ==
Ranking movements Legend: ██ Increase in ranking ██ Decrease in ranking
	Week															
Poll	Pre	1	2	3	4	5	6	7	8	9	10	11	12	13	14	Final
AP	1	1	1	1	1	1	1	1	2	2	2	2	2	2	2	2
Coaches	1	1	1	1	1	1	1	1	2	2	2	2	2	2	2	2

== Notes ==
- The team opened the season as the No. 1 team in both the AP and UPI polls.
- Second consecutive national championship; fourth in five years.
- UCLA became the first school to have a top winner in both basketball and football in the same year with quarterback Gary Beban winning the Heisman Trophy and Lew Alcindor winning the U.S. Basketball Writers Association player of the year award in 1968.
- Three days after he was benched by Coach Wooden during the "Game of the Century" on January 20, Edgar Lacey, a high school All-American at Jefferson High School and Los Angeles City Section Player of the Year in 1963, quit the team.
- On its 50th anniversary in 2018, the team was honored at halftime of the UCLA–Stanford game at Pauley Pavilion on January 27.

== Awards and honors ==
- Lew Alcindor, NCAA basketball tournament MOP (1968)
- Lew Alcindor, USBWA College Player of the Year
- Lew Alcindor, Helms Foundation Player of the Year award
- Lew Alcindor, First Team All-American; Lucius Allen, Second Team

== Team players drafted into the NBA ==
Round	Pick	Player	NBA Team
4	45	Mike Lynn	Chicago Bulls
4	49	Edgar Lacey	San Francisco Warriors
14	180	Mike Warren	Seattle SuperSonics
