= Oscar J. Underwood Jr. =

American pastor and educator (born 1949)

- Underwood Jr. in 2000
- Born: August 18, 1949 (age 76); Marion, Alabama, U.S.
- Occupations: Educator, pastor, community activist, author

Oscar J. Underwood Jr. (born August 18, 1949) is an American educator, author, pastor, and community activist.

Underwoood is the founder and President of Cornerstone Christian College Preparatory School and Cornerstone Christian Bible College International. His work in urban education spans over 40 years and includes becoming the first African American Indiana Teacher of the Year and testifying before the United States House of Representatives Committee on Small Business on effective urban education methods.

Underwood's published works include Assassination of Human Potential, Burden of Hope: Transition, Retention, and Collegiate Black Men, and Bumblebees Can Fly: Developing the Inherent Power in Young Men of Color Needed to Achieve in Education and Succeed in Life.

== Early life ==
Oscar J. Underwood Jr. was born in Marion, Alabama, and relocated with his family to Fort Wayne, Indiana at age three. He obtained a B.S. in Elementary Education from Indiana University–Purdue University Fort Wayne in 1972, an M.S. in Educational Administration and Curriculum Development from Indiana University in 1978, and an Ed.S. and Ph.D. in Higher Education Leadership, Administration and Foundations from Indiana State University in 2007 and 2012, respectively.

=== Education ===
In 1977, Underwood became the first Indiana African American Teacher of the Year. In 1982, he accepted a principalship at Ralph J. Bunche Elementary School in Fort Wayne, a then- failing, low-income, 98-percent African-American, inner-city school. Within two years, student achievement test scores in every grade level rose to the highest they had been in the school's then-history.

In 1991, Underwood left Ralph J. Bunche and founded Cornerstone Christian College Preparatory School in Fort Wayne. In 1998, Underwood testified before the United States Congressional Committee on Small Businesses regarding his strategies in urban education. In 1991 he opened c-prep and the first year

=== Ministry ===
In 1985, Underwood founded and became Senior Pastor of Cornerstone Christian Worship Center (now, Destiny Dome Embassy at Cathedral of Praise Ministries International) in Fort Wayne. In 1993, the ministry purchased a 46,000 square foot building. In 2000, the ministry opened Cornerstone Christian Bible College International in Fort Wayne.

== Published works ==
- Bumblebees Can Fly: Developing the Inherent Power in Young Men of Color Needed to Achieve in Education and Succeed in Life ǀ ISBN 978-1498444422
- Burden of Hope: Transition, Retention, and Collegiate Black Men ǀ ISBN 978-3639705539
- Assassination of Human Potential ǀ ISBN 978-1607910275

== Awards and honors ==
- Indiana Teacher of the Year (1977)
- Fort Wayne Police Merit Commission (1980)
- Fort Wayne Indiana Black Expo Inc. John Nuckols Award (1984)
- Indiana University - Purdue University Fort Wayne Outstanding Alumni (1994)
- Outstanding Hoosier Award (1994)
- Indiana Institute of Technology Board of Trustees (1993-1998)
- Indiana Platform Chairman of the Republican Party (1995)
- Indiana State Businessman of the Year (1998)
- Named to Stanford's Who's Who (2011)
- Golden Apple Award (2011)
