= 1967–68 Washington State Cougars men's basketball team =

American college basketball season

1967–68 Washington State Cougars men's basketball
- Conference: Athletic Association of Western Universities
- Record: 16–9 (8–6 AAWU, Pac-8)
- Head coach: Marv Harshman (10th season)
- Home arena: Bohler Gymnasium

1967–68 AAWU Conference men's basketball standings
	Conf.				Overall
Team	W		L	PCT	W		L	PCT
No. 2 UCLA	14	–	0	1.000	29	–	1	.967
USC	11	–	3	.786	18	–	8	.692
Washington State	8	–	6	.571	16	–	9	.640
California	7	–	7	.500	16	–	9	.640
Oregon State	5	–	9	.357	12	–	13	.480
Stanford	5	–	9	.357	11	–	15	.423
Washington	4	–	10	.286	12	–	14	.462
Oregon	2	–	12	.143	7	–	19	.269
Rankings from AP Poll

The 1967–68 Washington State Cougars men's basketball team represented Washington State University for the 1967–68 NCAA college basketball season. Led by tenth-year head coach Marv Harshman, the Cougars were members of the Athletic Association of Western Universities (AAWU, Pac-8) and played their home games on campus at Bohler Gymnasium in Pullman, Washington.

The Cougars were 16–9 overall in the regular season and 8–6 in conference play, third in the standings.
