= 1967–68 Washington Huskies men's basketball team =

American college basketball season

1967–68 Washington Huskies men's basketball
- Conference: Athletic Association of Western Universities
- Record: 12–14 (4–10 AAWU, Pac-8)
- Head coach: Mac Duckworth (5th season)
- Assistant coaches: Don Zech; Lynn Nance
- Home arena: Hec Edmundson Pavilion

1967–68 AAWU Conference men's basketball standings
	Conf.				Overall
Team	W		L	PCT	W		L	PCT
No. 2 UCLA	14	–	0	1.000	29	–	1	.967
USC	11	–	3	.786	18	–	8	.692
Washington State	8	–	6	.571	16	–	9	.640
California	7	–	7	.500	16	–	9	.640
Oregon State	5	–	9	.357	12	–	13	.480
Stanford	5	–	9	.357	11	–	15	.423
Washington	4	–	10	.286	12	–	14	.462
Oregon	2	–	12	.143	7	–	19	.269
Rankings from AP Poll

The 1967–68 Washington Huskies men's basketball team represented the University of Washington for the 1967–68 NCAA University Division basketball season. Led by fifth-year head coach Mac Duckworth, the Huskies were members of the Athletic Association of Western Universities (Pacific-8) and played their home games on campus at Hec Edmundson Pavilion in Seattle, Washington.

The Huskies were 12–14 overall in the regular season and 4–10 in conference play, seventh in the standings.

Duckworth resigned on March 19, and Tex Winter was hired away from Kansas State the following week.
