= Game of the Century (college basketball) =

1968 game between Houston and UCLA

Game of the Century College Basketball
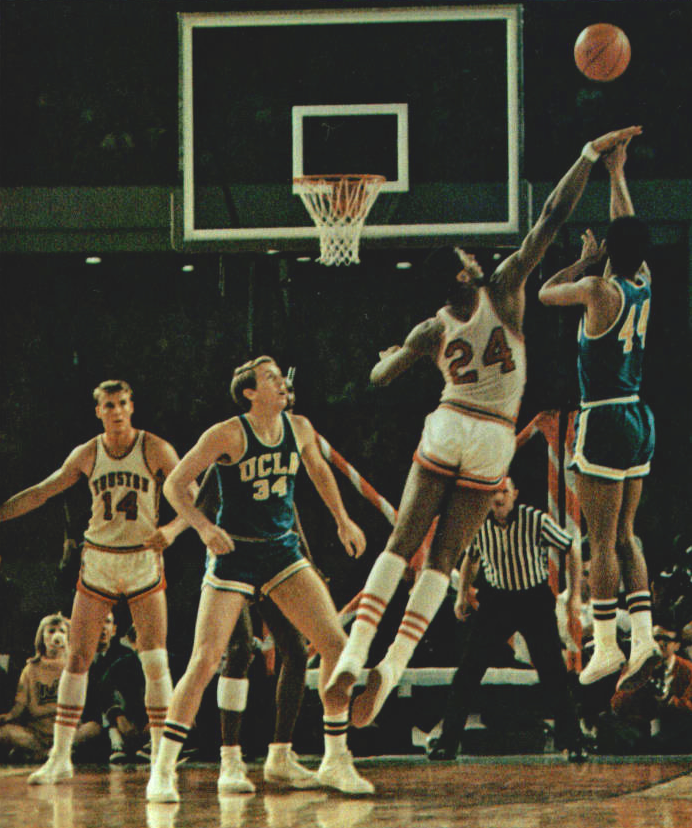
UCLA Bruins	Houston Cougars
Pac-8	Independent
(13–0)	(14–0)
69	71
Head coach: John Wooden	Head coach: Guy Lewis
- AP: 1
- AP: 2
	1st half	2nd half	Total
UCLA Bruins	43	26	69
Houston Cougars	46	25	71
- Date: January 20, 1968
- Venue: Astrodome, Houston, Texas
- Attendance: 52,693

United States TV coverage
- Network: TVS Television Network
- Announcers: Dick Enberg and Bob Pettit

In U.S. men's college basketball, the Game of the Century was a historic National Collegiate Athletic Association (NCAA) game between the Houston Cougars and the UCLA Bruins played on January 20, 1968, at the Astrodome in Houston, Texas. It was the first NCAA regular season game broadcast nationwide in prime time. It established college basketball as a sports commodity on television and led to the modern "March Madness" television coverage.

== History ==
The UCLA Bruins were the dominant NCAA men's basketball program of the era, having won Division I championships in 1964, 1965, and 1967. Kareem Abdul-Jabbar (then known as Lew Alcindor) of UCLA was a talented player credited with reviving interest in college basketball, with Bruin games selling out arenas. Houston Cougars coach Guy Lewis wanted to prove his program's worth to his critics, so he scheduled a game against UCLA that season. Houston and UCLA had met in the previous season in the semifinals of the 1967 NCAA Tournament. UCLA had beaten Houston 73–58 on the way to winning their third NCAA championship.

== The game ==
Ted Nance, the sports information director for the University of Houston, put the schedule together. UCLA sports information director J. D. Morgan talked Bruins head coach John Wooden into the game by explaining how great it would be for college basketball. Nance put advertisements in the Cougar football programs touting the game as the "Game of the Century."

Alcindor went into the game with a scratched cornea. He had been hospitalized the previous week, missing two games, and it was only certain he would play the day before the game.

The game was televised nationally via a syndication package through the TVS Television Network, with Dick Enberg announcing and Bob Pettit providing color commentary. Morgan had insisted to TVS owner Eddie Einhorn that TVS use Enberg, the Bruins' play-by-play announcer. Einhorn paid $27,000 for the broadcast rights on TVS. TVS signed up 120 stations, many of which would preempt regularly scheduled network programming. As the game was played in a baseball stadium, the basketball floor was brought in from the Los Angeles Memorial Sports Arena. As for the physical conditions of play, Wooden said, "'It was a terrible place to play, in reality .... The court was out in the middle, the seats were way back--and of course the dressing rooms seemed a quarter-mile away.'”

The Bruins arrived in Houston with a 47-game, two-and-a-half-season winning streak. The Cougars were also undefeated since the last meeting between the two teams.

The first half between the AP Poll's No. 1 UCLA and No. 2 Houston closed with the Cougars up by three points. The second half saw the tension between the squads highlighted within the matchup of Houston's Elvin Hayes and UCLA's Alcindor. Hayes, a 6-foot-9 forward, was not directly matched against the 7-foot-2 Alcindor, but he did block three of Alcindor's shots, and the crowd roared his nickname, "Big E."

With two minutes remaining in the game, the score was tied at 69 after the Bruins' Lucius Allen made a pair of free throws. Hayes took a shot and was fouled by Bruins reserve Jim Nielsen. Hayes, playing with four fouls in the second half, scored two free throws. The Bruins still had time to score, but an attempted basket by Allen would not drop. On the last possession, UCLA's All-American guard Mike Warren committed a rare mental error deflecting out of bounds a pass meant for UCLA's star shooter Lynn Shackelford, who was unguarded in the corner.

In the end, the Cougars pulled the upset, 71–69, ending the Bruins' 47-game winning streak.

== Aftermath ==
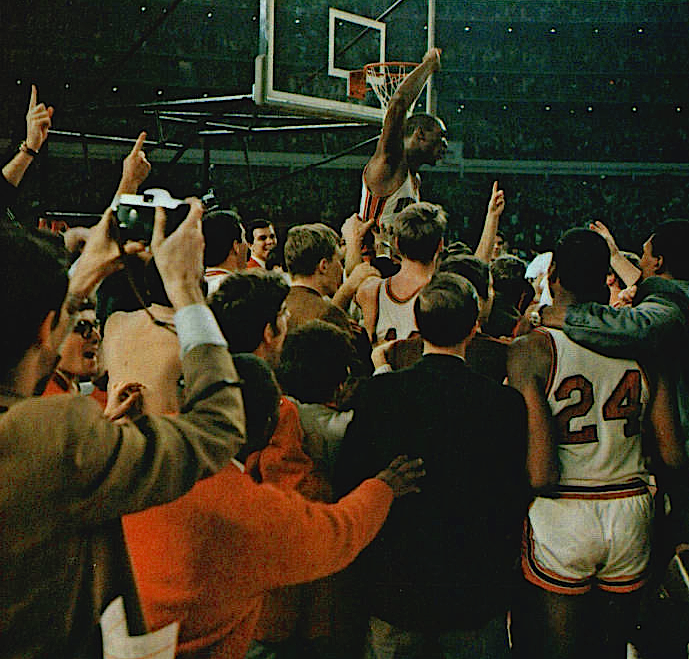
Houston's Elvin Hayes is carried in a victory celebration on the Astrodome's floor

Up to that point, only NCAA post-season games had been broadcast nationally, so there was much skepticism regarding where the broadcast would take the non-profit organization's policy. The broadcast drew a vast television audience in addition to the 52,693 fans who had filled the Astrodome for its first basketball game. Each school received $125,000 for the game, four times the 1968 NCAA tournament payout of $31,781.

The January 1968 cover of Sports Illustrated depicted the game, with Hayes shooting over Alcindor. Alcindor—who had sustained an eye injury at a game against Cal a week earlier—had the worst performance of his college career. It was one of only two times in his UCLA career that he shot less than 50% from the field.

Three days after the game, UCLA starting forward Edgar Lacy quit the team. Wooden had benched him after 11 minutes, and he never re-entered the game. Upset with Wooden's public comments implying that he did not want back into the game, Lacy quit the team. "I've never enjoyed playing for that man," Lacy said of Wooden after quitting. In 2008, Wooden stated, "I'm sorry I said that. It hurt him, and that's why he quit. I was very disappointed. Edgar was a fine boy."

Neither Houston nor UCLA lost another game for the remainder of the regular season. The teams met again in the 1968 NCAA Tournament semifinals, with the then-No. 2 ranked Bruins winning 101–69 against the No. 1 Cougars. Assistant coach Jerry Norman was credited by Wooden for devising the diamond-and-one defense that the Bruins used to contain Hayes, who was averaging 37.7 points per game but was held to only 10. UCLA advanced and defeated the North Carolina Tar Heels 78–55 for the 1968 title. Houston also lost the consolation game to Ohio State. Those games were at the Los Angeles Memorial Sports Arena, on the same floor used in the Astrodome game.

The 1971 NCAA Tournament was held at the Astrodome following the success of the game and drew more than 31,000 spectators for both the semifinals and championship. The 1982 tournament was held at the Louisiana Superdome. Eventually, most Final Fours were awarded only to host cities with domed stadiums. Starting with the 1997 tournament, only domed stadiums have hosted the Final Four.

UCLA and Houston played again in 1969 at Pauley Pavilion for the regular-season rematch. UCLA won 100–64. UCLA won six more national championships under Wooden. Lewis led his Phi Slama Jama teams to three consecutive Final Fours (1982–1984), advancing to the national championship game in 1983 and 1984.

In 2006, Hayes, Kareem Abdul-Jabbar and Wooden were inducted into the National Collegiate Basketball Hall of Fame, followed by Lewis in 2007.

== Significance ==
Previously, only NCAA post-season games were broadcast on national television. The "Game of the Century" proved that a national audience would watch college basketball games during the regular season. Furthermore, it was telecast not by a Big Three Network but rather by the independent TVS Television Network. In 1969, NBC became the first major network to broadcast the championship game, at a cost of more than $500,000. In 2008, the NCAA deal with CBS to televise the entire tournament was worth $545 million.

== Bibliography ==
- Einhorn, Eddie; Ron Rapaport (2006). How March Became Madness: How the NCAA Tournament Became the Greatest Sporting Event in America. Chicago, Illinois: Triumph Books. ISBN 1-57243-809-6.
- Sports Illustrated January 29, 1968
- Jerry Wizig - UH Stuns Mighty UCLA 71-69. Houston Chronicle, January 21, 1968
- Jeff Prugh - Big E Stands For End Of Bruin Streak. Los Angeles Times, January 21, 1968
- J.R. Gonzales - The Game of the Century: Looking back 40 years
- Al Carter - `GAME OF THE CENTURY'/A boon for college basketball, a bust for spectators. Houston Chronicle, January 20, 1988
- Eddie Sefko - `GAME OF THE CENTURY'/Game now unimportant, says Hayes. Houston Chronicle, January 20, 1988
