= Edgar Lacy =

American basketball player (1944–2011)

Personal information
- Born: August 2, 1944 Los Angeles, California, U.S.
- Died: March 22, 2011 (aged 66) West Sacramento, California, U.S.
- Listed height: 6 ft 6 in (1.98 m)
- Listed weight: 190 lb (86 kg)

Career information
- High school: Jefferson (Los Angeles, California)
- College: UCLA (1964–1968)
- NBA draft: 1968: 4th round, 43rd overall pick
- Drafted by: San Francisco Warriors
- Position: Small forward
- Number: 22

Career history
- 1968–1969: Los Angeles Stars

Career highlights
- NCAA champion (1965); Mr. Basketball USA (1963); 2× First-team Parade All-American (1962, 1963); California Mr. Basketball (1963)
- Stats at Basketball Reference

Edgar Eddie Lacy (August 2, 1944 – March 22, 2011) was an American basketball player who won two NCAA championships for the UCLA Bruins, then played one season in the American Basketball Association with the Los Angeles Stars. In public printed media, his last name was generally rendered as Lacey. However, at the time he signed his professional contract, he indicated the correct spelling had always been Lacy.

Lacy was a highly decorated player at Jefferson High School in Los Angeles. He was twice named a high school All-American by Parade and was Los Angeles city player of the year as a senior in 1963. Lacy chose to attend hometown University of California, Los Angeles, and play for future Hall of Fame coach John Wooden. In his sophomore season, he was a starter on the Bruins' 1964–65 championship team. After a strong junior season, Lacy redshirted what would have been his senior year with a broken leg in 1966–67 as the Bruins won their third championship.

In 1967–68, Lacy opted to return and was again a starter for the Bruins. However, in a highly anticipated match-up between the Bruins and the Houston Cougars—a contest dubbed the "Game of the Century" by the media—Wooden benched Lacy after 11 minutes and he never re-entered the game. Upset with Wooden's public comments implying that he did not want back into the game, Lacy quit the team three days later, missing what would be another UCLA championship run. "I've never enjoyed playing for that man," Lacy said of Wooden after quitting. In 2008, Wooden stated, "I'm sorry I said that. It hurt him, and that's why he quit. I was very disappointed. Edgar was a fine boy."

Lacy was drafted by the San Francisco Warriors in the fourth round of the 1968 NBA draft (he had also been drafted by the Boston Celtics the previous year). However, he instead played in the ABA for the Los Angeles Stars. Lacy played one season for the Stars, averaging 5.1 points and 3.9 rebounds in 46 games. Prior to the next season, he retired from professional basketball, stating his intention to return to college to pursue a law degree. Lacy ended up playing his entire basketball career—high school, college and pro—for teams based in Los Angeles.

Edgar Lacy lived in West Sacramento, California where he died on March 22, 2011.
