= TVS Television Network =

Syndicated television production company

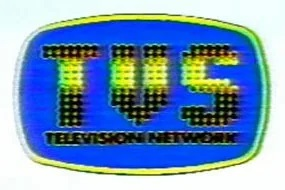
- Industry: Television syndication
- Founded: December 27, 1968 (57 years ago)
- Defunct: August 29, 1993 (33 years ago)
- Fate: Closed
- Headquarters: New York City, New York
- Owner: Eddie Einhorn (1968—1973); Corinthian Broadcasting Corporation (Dun & Bradstreet) (1973—1993)
- Parent: TVS Inc.

The TVS Television Network (commonly referred to as just TVS; informally referred to by the press as the Television Sports Television Network) was a syndicator of American sports programming. It was one of several "occasional" national television networks that sprang up in the 1960s to take advantage of the establishment of independent (mostly UHF) television stations and relaxation of the AT&T Long Lines usage rates.

== History ==
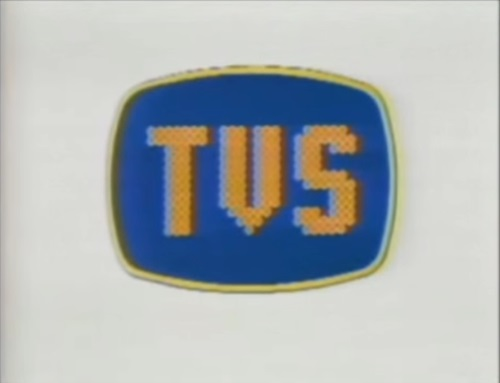
Alternative logo for TVS Television Network

Eddie Einhorn had begun broadcasting radio coverage of college basketball and built a network of radio stations that covered the NCAA Division I men's basketball tournament games. He later moved into television coverage of college basketball games.

=== College basketball ===
Founded by Einhorn on December 27, 1968, and operated through TVS Inc., TVS originally telecast college basketball games to regional networks at a time when the sport was of no interest to the national networks. Taking advantage of intense regional collegiate rivalries, the network blossomed in the 1960s and developed into a full service sports network. Einhorn proceeded to put together a Saturday afternoon TVS "game of the week" concept that often featured some of the major midwestern independent teams such as Marquette, DePaul, and Notre Dame. These games were widely syndicated at least in the east and midwest.

On January 20, 1968, TVS put together the "Game of the Century" (see below) between the UCLA Bruins and Houston Cougars basketball teams at the Houston Astrodome. This was the game that made college basketball a television broadcast commodity. Six years later (January 19, 1974), TVS televised another historic basketball game as the Bruins fell to Notre Dame, 71-70, breaking the Bruins' 88-game winning streak.

TVS proceeded to syndicate a few games nationally each year, often involving UCLA in the middle of their run of 10 national championships in a 12-year span. The company often used late night time slots for its nationally syndicated games which were played on the west coast.

In the early 1970s, TVS became a pioneer in bringing college basketball to a national scope with announcers Dick Enberg and Rod Hundley. The duo would often call a Pac-8 game on a Friday night, fly to the midwest for the TVS game of the week on Saturday afternoon, and then head back to the west coast to call a Pac-8 game on Saturday night.

In 1975, TVS teamed with NBC Sports to regionalize NBC's college basketball coverage on Saturday afternoons, with NBC providing local talent and TVS the production crews. This partnership lasted through 1983, though it had been hampered the previous year as NBC lost the rights to the NCAA Division I Men's College Basketball Tournament to CBS Sports.

In 1984, college sports telecasts underwent a decentralization following the NCAA v. Board of Regents of the University of Oklahoma court decision. The NBC partnership ended and TVS went back to regionalizing games on their own ad-hoc network.

Besides Dick Enberg and Rod Hundley (who worked with Merle Harmon on the January 7, 1973, contest between Kansas and Notre Dame), other broadcast teams for TVS' college basketball coverage included John Ferguson and Joe Dean (who called the February 21, 1970 contest between Kentucky and LSU), Monte Moore and Ed Macauley (who called the January 2, 1971 contest between Dayton and UCLA), Charlie Jones and Elgin Baylor (who called the January 26, 1972 contest between Providence and USC), Ray Scott and Bill O'Donnell (who called the January 14, 1973 contest between SW Louisiana and Oral Roberts), Al Michaels and Tom Hawkins (who called the January 26, 1974, contest between Notre Dame and UCLA), Max Falkenstein and Paul Deweese (Big Eight Conference) and Jay Randolph and Billy Packer (who called the November 17, 1979 contest between Duke and Kentucky, November 22, 1980 contest between DePaul and Louisville) and November 21, 1981 contest between BYU and Virginia).

==== "Game of the Century" ====
The game that really popularized televised college basketball was a prime time Saturday night broadcast on January 20, 1968 between two powerhouse teams that had met in the 1967 NCAA Men's Division I Basketball Tournament. The undefeated, second-ranked Houston Cougars hosted the equally unbeaten, top-ranked UCLA Bruins at the Houston Astrodome. The Bruins were the defending national champions and riding a 47-game winning streak. Eddie Einhorn paid $27,000 for the broadcast rights on TVS. Altogether, Einhorn signed up 120 stations, many of whom were network affiliates that dropped or time-shifted their regular programming to show the game. Houston won, 71–69, in front of a then-record crowd of 52,693, and the contest was soon dubbed "The Game of the Century".

The "Game of the Century" showed that regular-season college basketball action was a viable nationwide product; previously, only NCAA post-season games were broadcast on national TV, but only on evidence that broadcasters were going to make a profit from the broadcasts.

=== Other sports on TVS ===
While college basketball remained the TVS Television Network's signature series, they also expanded into tennis, college football bowl games, NASL pro soccer, tennis, and golf. They also televised the NBA–ABA All-Star Game between the rival professional basketball leagues.

In 1974, the network became the official telecaster of the World Football League. (TVS dropped its coverage of the WFL prior to 1975, contributing to the league's already imminent demise; the league had no national television contract for their shortened second season.) TVS also aired World Championship Tennis.

=== Entertainment programming ===
In the 1970s, TVS began producing entertainment programming, including Sinatra: The Main Event for ABC in 1974. For many years, TVS produced sports and entertainment programming from Las Vegas including the Alan King Tennis Classic at Caesars Palace; Arm Wrestling at the Imperial Palace, Fun Moments in Sports at Bally's; Bowling from Sam's Town and the Showboat; The Ladies Pro Bowlers Tour (LPBT), and One Club Golf from the Desert Inn.

=== Transition ===
By 1973, Einhorn sold his interest in the network to the Corinthian Broadcasting Corporation for $5 million and later on became the head of CBS Sports, and later became an owner of the Chicago White Sox with Jerry Reinsdorf; he would also spend time as owner of the USFL's Chicago Blitz. The network stalled in the 1990s, with the trademark status for the network's branding expiring on August 29, 1993. It was presumed that the network itself would cease operations soon after.

According to a search on the website for the New York State Department of State Division of Corporations, TVS, Inc. itself would eventually cease operations in 1995.

== See also ==
- 1968 in television
- Game of the Century (college basketball)

Preceded by None	Syndication Rights Holder to Southeastern Conference men's basketball 1969-1983	Succeeded by Lorimar Sports Network
