= NBA All-Star Game =

All-Star Game in the NBA

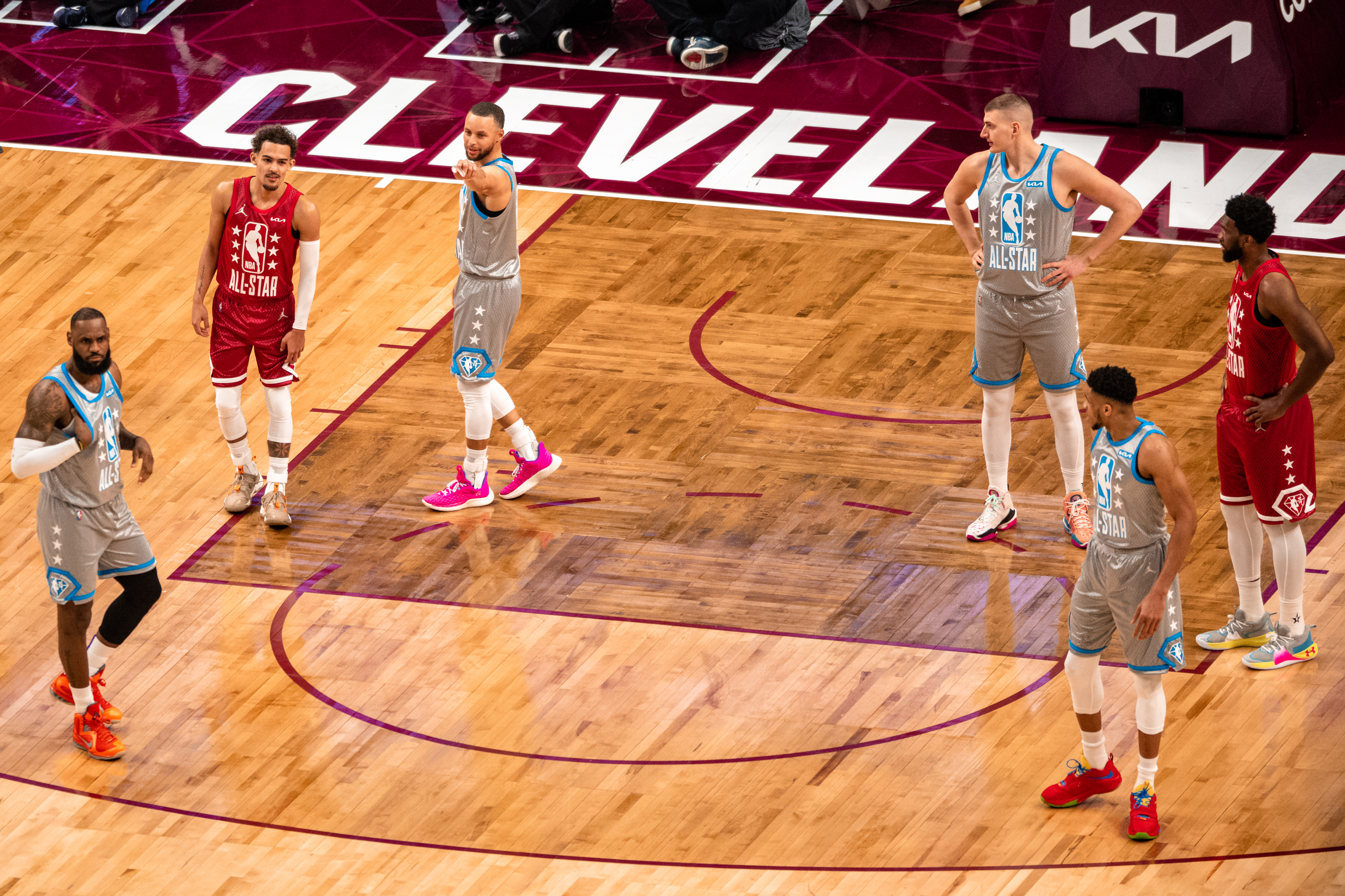
- 2022 NBA All Star Game in Cleveland
- Frequency: Annual
- Inaugurated: 1951 (Boston)
- Previous event: 2026 (Inglewood, California)
- Next event: 2027 (Phoenix, Arizona)
- Participants: Eastern Conference and Western Conference All-Stars
- Organizer: National Basketball Association
- 2026 NBA All-Star Game

The National Basketball Association All-Star Game is the annual all-star game hosted each February by the National Basketball Association (NBA) and showcases 24 of the league's star players. Since 2022, it was held on the third Sunday of February, the same day that the Daytona 500 was held usually the week after the Super Bowl. It is the featured event of NBA All-Star Weekend, a three-day event which goes from Friday to Sunday. The All-Star Game was first played at the Boston Garden on March 2, 1951.

The starting lineup for each squad is selected by a combination of fan, player, and media voting, while head coaches choose the reserves, seven players from their respective conferences, so each side has a 12-man roster. Coaches are not allowed to vote for their own players. If a selected player cannot participate because of injury, the NBA commissioner selects a replacement.

Traditionally, the NBA All-Star Game pitted the top players from both the Eastern Division/Eastern Conference and the Western Division/Western Conference. From 2018 to 2023, the teams were represented by the leading vote-getter from each conference and each player regardless of conference was chosen to either team via a draft. The teams also play for a charity of their choice to help the games remain competitive. In 2025 and 2026, the format consists of an elimination-style tournament in which the winning team is the one who first scores 40 points in a game.

The head coach of the team with the best record in each conference is chosen to lead their respective conference in the All-Star Game, with a prohibition against consecutive appearances. Known as the "Riley Rule", it was created after perennially successful Los Angeles Lakers head coach Pat Riley earned the right to coach the Western Conference team eight times in nine seasons between 1982 and 1990. The coach of the team with the next best record gets to coach instead.

== History ==
The idea of holding an All-Star Game was conceived during a meeting between NBA President Maurice Podoloff, NBA publicity director Haskell Cohen and Boston Celtics owner Walter A. Brown. At that time, the basketball world had just been rocked by the college basketball point-shaving scandal.

To regain public attention to the league, Cohen suggests the league to host an exhibition game featuring the league's best players, similar to Major League Baseball's All-Star Game. Although most people, including Podoloff, were pessimistic about the idea, Brown remained confident that it would be a success, and he offered to host the game and to cover all the expenses or potential losses incurred from the game.

The first All-Star Game was hosted at the Boston Garden on March 2, 1951, where the Eastern All-Stars team defeated the Western All-Stars team, 111–94. Boston Celtics' Ed Macauley was named as the first NBA All-Star Game Most Valuable Player, and the All-Star Game became a success, drawing an attendance of 10,094, much higher than that season's average attendance of 3,500.

In 2010, the NBA All-Star Game set the attendance record for a basketball game with 108,713 people attending at Cowboys Stadium in Arlington, Texas. This shattered the existing attendance record previously held at Ford Field on December 13, 2003, when 78,129 attendees watched Michigan State play Kentucky.

The 2017 All-Star Weekend was originally awarded to Charlotte, North Carolina. On March 23, 2016, North Carolina passed House Bill 2, also known as a "bathroom bill", which was seen as discriminatory against transgender persons. As a result, the NBA announced that it would move the game to another city if the bill was not repealed or revised. After North Carolina took no action, on July 21, 2016, the NBA announced that the 2017 game would be moved to New Orleans. In March 2017, after several provisions of the bill were partially repealed, the NBA awarded the 2019 All-Star Weekend to Charlotte.

On October 3, 2017, the NBA and NBPA announced changes to the game format, starting in 2018. Instead of being divided by conference, the top vote leaders for each conference would be team captains and hold a draft to choose among the rest of the starters and reserves, regardless of conference.

In 2023, Candace Parker became the first female color commentator for an NBA All-Star Game.

On October 25, 2023, the NBA brought back the conference-based format for the 2024 All-Star Game. The untimed fourth quarter (known as Elam Ending), which had been in used since 2020 in honor of Kobe Bryant, was also removed. However, the charity aspect was retained, with the team that scores the most points in each quarter winning a cash prize that went to their chosen charity.

A new format for the 2025 All-Star Game featured a mini-tournament with four teams of eight players: three teams featuring 24 NBA All-Star selections, and a fourth team composed of the winning team from the Rising Stars Challenge, an exhibition game pitting a mix of NBA rookies and sophomores plus standouts from the NBA G League. Each team was named after the analysts of Inside the NBA. The head coaches in the tournament came from the teams who had the best record in their respective conference through February 2, with the assistant coaches from either team taking over the Rising Stars team and the remaining All-Star team. Three games, each to 40 points, were played.

The tournament format was retained for the 2026 All-Star Game, but the three All-Star teams now consist of a "World" team consisting of eight All-Stars born outside the U.S. and two "U.S." teams consisting of 16 All-Stars born in the United States. In the updated format, Team A plays Team B in Game 1. The winner of that game plays Team C in Game 2, and the losing team plays Team C in Game 3. The top two teams after three games would play in the championship game, with the tiebreaker determined by point differential in the first three games. A modified voting format was also introduced, with All-Stars getting selected regardless of position. If the voting does not result in the selection of 16 "U.S." All-Stars and eight "World" All-Stars, then the commissioner will select additional All-Stars in order to reach the minimum of eight players each.

== Rosters selection ==
The starting five from each conference consists of three frontcourt players and two guards, selected by a combination of fan, player, and media voting. In 2017, the NBA moved from a pure fan vote to a weighted process wherein fan voting accounts for 50%, with player and media voting account for 25% each. Prior to 2013, fans selected two forwards and one center instead of generic frontcourt players. The NBA in 2003 began offering All-Star ballots in three languages—English, Spanish and Chinese—for fan voting of the starters. Starting with the 2026 game, voting will no longer be restricted to position.

NBA coaches vote for the reserves for their respective conferences, but they cannot choose players from their own team. Each coach selects two guards, three frontcourt players and two wild cards, with each selected player ranked in order of preference within each category. If a multi-position player is to be selected, coaches are encouraged to vote for the player at the position that is "most advantageous for the All-Star team", regardless of where the player is listed on the All-Star ballot or the position he is listed in box scores. If a player is unavailable for the game due to injury, the NBA commissioner selects a replacement for the roster. If the replacement is for a fan-selected starter, the All-Star Game coach chooses the replacement in the starting lineup, and is not limited to the commissioner's addition to the roster.

Multiple All-Star players can be chosen from one team, with the record being four. This has occurred nine times, the first such instance being in 1962, when four players each from the Boston Celtics and Los Angeles Lakers were chosen. The most recent game with four All-Star players from one team was the Golden State Warriors in the 2018 game.

== The game ==
The game is played under normal NBA rules with some differences. Since the starting All-Stars are selected by fans, players, and media, players sometimes start the game at atypical positions. For instance, in the 2007 game, Kobe Bryant and Tracy McGrady were chosen as the starting Western Conference guards. As both players normally play shooting guard, Bryant started the game as a point guard. Gameplay usually involves players attempting spectacular slam dunks and alley oops and defensive effort is limited. The final score is generally much higher than a competitive NBA game.

If the score is close, the fourth quarter becomes more competitive. The fourth quarter was changed in 2020 to use the Elam Ending. In normal Elam Ending rules, the game clock is turned off with four minutes remaining and a target score is set; whoever reaches the target wins the game. In 2020, the NBA took the score at the end of three quarters and added 24 points (in honor of Kobe Bryant, who had been killed in a helicopter crash a month prior). With Team Giannis leading Team LeBron 133–124 at the end of the third quarter, the target score was 157 points, and Team LeBron won the contest.

The player introductions are accompanied by significant fanfare, including lighting effects, dance music, DJ's, elaborate portable stages, and pyrotechnics. Special uniforms are designed for the game each year, usually red for the Western Conference and blue for the Eastern Conference. From 1997 to 2002, players could wear their normal team uniforms. The "host conference" also traditionally has light uniforms, except from 2010 to 2014. In the past, players who wore the same number were given the option to pick a different numeral. For example, Patrick Ewing, who normally wore #33, ended up wearing #3 early in his career as Larry Bird also had that number. Since 1997, players can keep their uniform numbers. A major recording artist typically sings "O Canada" and "The Star-Spangled Banner" prior to tipoff.

Halftime is longer than a typical NBA game partly due to musical performances by popular artists. The first such halftime show happened in the 2000 game, with Kenny Wayne Shepherd, Mary J. Blige, 98 Degrees, Montell Jordan, Martina McBride, and LL Cool J performing.

== All-Star Game results ==
List of each All-Star Game, the venue at which it was played, and the Game MVP. Parenthesized numbers indicate multiple times that venue, city, or player has occurred as of that instance (e.g. "Michael Jordan (2)" in 1996 indicates that was his second All-Star MVP award). As of the 2025 All-Star Game (the 2024–25 NBA season), the Eastern Conference leads with a record of 38 wins and 29 losses.

Western Conference (29 wins)	Eastern Conference (38 wins)

Note: Venue names are listed as of the date of the All-Star Game.

Year	Result	Host arena	Host city	Game MVP
1951	East 111 – 94 West	Boston Garden	Boston, MA	Ed Macauley; Boston Celtics
1952	East 108 – 91 West	Boston Garden (2)	Boston, MA (2)	Paul Arizin; Philadelphia Warriors
1953	West 79 – 75 East	Allen County War Memorial Coliseum	Fort Wayne, IN	George Mikan; Minneapolis Lakers
1954	East 98 – 93 West (Overtime)	Madison Square Garden III**	New York City, NY	Bob Cousy; Boston Celtics
1955	East 100 – 91 West	Madison Square Garden III** (2)	New York City, NY (2)	Bill Sharman; Boston Celtics
1956	West 108 – 94 East	Rochester War Memorial Coliseum	Rochester, NY	Bob Pettit; St. Louis Hawks
1957	East 109 – 97 West	Boston Garden (3)	Boston, MA (3)	Bob Cousy (2); Boston Celtics
1958	East 130 – 118 West	St. Louis Arena	St. Louis, MO	Bob Pettit (2); St. Louis Hawks
1959	West 124 – 108 East	Olympia Stadium	Detroit, MI	Elgin Baylor; Minneapolis Lakers Bob Pettit (3); St. Louis Hawks
1960	East 125 – 115 West	Convention Hall	Philadelphia, PA	Wilt Chamberlain; Philadelphia Warriors
1961	West 153 – 131 East	Onondaga County War Memorial Coliseum	Syracuse, NY	Oscar Robertson; Cincinnati Royals
1962	West 150 – 130 East	St. Louis Arena (2)	St. Louis, MO (2)	Bob Pettit (4); St. Louis Hawks
1963	East 115 – 108 West	LA Sports Arena	Los Angeles, CA	Bill Russell; Boston Celtics
1964	East 111 – 107 West	Boston Garden (4)	Boston, MA (4)	Oscar Robertson; Cincinnati Royals
1965	East 124 – 123 West	St. Louis Arena (3)	St. Louis, MO (3)	Jerry Lucas; Cincinnati Royals
1966	East 137 – 94 West	Cincinnati Gardens	Cincinnati, OH	Adrian Smith; Cincinnati Royals
1967	West 135 – 120 East	Cow Palace	Daly City, CA	Rick Barry; San Francisco Warriors
1968	East 144 – 124 West	Madison Square Garden III** (3)	New York City, NY (3)	Hal Greer; Philadelphia 76ers
1969	East 123 – 112 West	Baltimore Civic Center	Baltimore, MD	Oscar Robertson (3); Cincinnati Royals
1970	East 142 – 135 West	The Spectrum	Philadelphia, PA (2)	Willis Reed; New York Knicks
1971	West 108 – 107 East	San Diego Sports Arena	San Diego, CA	Lenny Wilkens; Seattle SuperSonics
1972	West 112 – 110 East	The Forum	Inglewood, CA	Jerry West; Los Angeles Lakers
1973	East 104 – 84 West	Chicago Stadium	Chicago, IL	Dave Cowens; Boston Celtics
1974	West 134 – 123 East	Seattle Center Coliseum	Seattle, WA	Bob Lanier; Detroit Pistons
1975	East 108 – 102 West	Arizona Veterans Memorial Coliseum	Phoenix, AZ	Walt Frazier; New York Knicks
1976	East 123 – 109 West	The Spectrum (2)	Philadelphia, PA (3)	Dave Bing; Washington Bullets
1977	West 125 – 124 East	Milwaukee Arena	Milwaukee, WI	Julius Erving; Philadelphia 76ers
1978	East 133 – 125 West	Omni Coliseum	Atlanta, GA	Randy Smith; Buffalo Braves
1979	West 134 – 129 East	Pontiac Silverdome	Pontiac, MI †	David Thompson; Denver Nuggets
1980	East 144 – 136 West (Overtime)	Capital Centre	Landover, MD	George Gervin; San Antonio Spurs
1981	East 123 – 120 West	Coliseum at Richfield	Richfield, OH	Nate Archibald; Boston Celtics
1982	East 120 – 118 West	Brendan Byrne Arena	East Rutherford, NJ	Larry Bird, Boston Celtics
1983	East 132 – 123 West	The Forum (2)	Inglewood, CA (2)	Julius Erving (2); Philadelphia 76ers
1984	East 154 – 145 West (Overtime)	McNichols Sports Arena	Denver, CO	Isiah Thomas; Detroit Pistons
1985	West 140 – 129 East	Hoosier Dome (Note: The Slam Dunk Contest, among other side events, took place at Market Square Arena.)	Indianapolis, IN †	Ralph Sampson; Houston Rockets
1986	East 139 – 132 West	Reunion Arena	Dallas, TX	Isiah Thomas (2); Detroit Pistons
1987	West 154 – 149 East (Overtime)	Kingdome (Note: The Slam Dunk Contest and Three-Point Contest, among other side events, took place at Seattle Center Coliseum.)	Seattle, WA † (2)	Tom Chambers; Seattle SuperSonics
1988	East 138 – 133 West	Chicago Stadium (2)	Chicago, IL (2)	Michael Jordan; Chicago Bulls
1989	West 143 – 134 East	Astrodome (Note: The Slam Dunk Contest and Three-Point Contest, among other side events, took place at The Summit.)	Houston, TX †	Karl Malone; Utah Jazz
1990	East 130 – 113 West	Miami Arena	Miami, FL	Magic Johnson; Los Angeles Lakers
1991	East 116 – 114 West	Charlotte Coliseum	Charlotte, NC	Charles Barkley; Philadelphia 76ers
1992	West 153 – 113 East	Orlando Arena	Orlando, FL	Magic Johnson (2); Los Angeles Lakers
1993	West 135 – 132 East (Overtime)	Delta Center§	Salt Lake City, UT	Karl Malone (2); Utah Jazz John Stockton; Utah Jazz
1994	East 127 – 118 West	Target Center	Minneapolis, MN	Scottie Pippen; Chicago Bulls
1995	West 139 – 112 East	America West Arena §	Phoenix, AZ (2)	Mitch Richmond; Sacramento Kings
1996	East 129 – 118 West	Alamodome	San Antonio, TX	Michael Jordan (2); Chicago Bulls
1997	East 132 – 120 West	Gund Arena §	Cleveland, OH	Glen Rice; Charlotte Hornets
1998	East 135, West 114	Madison Square Garden***	New York City, New York (4)	Michael Jordan (3); Chicago Bulls
1999	Canceled due to the league's lockout. The game was originally set to be played at the First Union Center in Philadelphia, Pennsylvania.			
2000	West 137 – 126 East	The Arena in Oakland	Oakland, CA	Tim Duncan; San Antonio Spurs Shaquille O'Neal; Los Angeles Lakers
2001	East 111 – 110 West	MCI Center	Washington, D.C.	Allen Iverson; Philadelphia 76ers
2002	West 135 – 120 East	First Union Center	Philadelphia, PA (4)	Kobe Bryant; Los Angeles Lakers
2003	West 155 – 145 East (Double overtime)	Philips Arena§	Atlanta, GA (2)	Kevin Garnett; Minnesota Timberwolves
2004	West 136 – 132 East	Staples Center (Note: The Los Angeles Clippers and the Los Angeles Lakers jointly hosted the event.)	Los Angeles, CA (2)	Shaquille O'Neal (2); Los Angeles Lakers
2005	East 125 – 115 West	Pepsi Center	Denver, CO (2)	Allen Iverson (2); Philadelphia 76ers
2006	East 122 – 120 West	Toyota Center	Houston, TX (2)	LeBron James; Cleveland Cavaliers
2007	West 153 – 132 East	Thomas & Mack Center	Paradise, NV*	Kobe Bryant (2); Los Angeles Lakers
2008	East 134 – 128 West	New Orleans Arena §	New Orleans, LA	LeBron James (2); Cleveland Cavaliers
2009	West 146 – 119 East	US Airways Center (2)	Phoenix, AZ (3)	Kobe Bryant (3); Los Angeles Lakers Shaquille O'Neal (3); Phoenix Suns
2010	East 141 – 139 West	Cowboys Stadium (Note: The Slam Dunk Contest and Three-Point Contest, among other side events, took place at American Airlines Center.)	Arlington, TX #†	Dwyane Wade; Miami Heat
2011	West 148 – 143 East	Staples Center (2) (Note: The Los Angeles Clippers and the Los Angeles Lakers jointly hosted the event.)	Los Angeles, CA (3)	Kobe Bryant (4); Los Angeles Lakers
2012	West 152 – 149 East	Amway Center	Orlando, FL (2)	Kevin Durant; Oklahoma City Thunder
2013	West 143 – 138 East	Toyota Center (2)	Houston, TX (3)	Chris Paul; Los Angeles Clippers
2014	East 163 – 155 West	Smoothie King Center (2)	New Orleans, LA (2)	Kyrie Irving; Cleveland Cavaliers
2015	West 163 – 158 East	Madison Square Garden (2)*** (Note: The Slam Dunk Contest and Three-Point Contest, among other side events, took place at Barclays Center. The Brooklyn Nets and the New York Knicks jointly hosted the event.)	New York City, NY (5)	Russell Westbrook; Oklahoma City Thunder
2016	West 196 – 173 East	Air Canada Centre	Toronto, Ontario, Canada	Russell Westbrook (2); Oklahoma City Thunder
2017	West 192 – 182 East	Smoothie King Center (3)	New Orleans, LA (3)	Anthony Davis; New Orleans Pelicans
2018	Team LeBron 148 – 145 Team Stephen	Staples Center (3) (Note: The Los Angeles Clippers and the Los Angeles Lakers jointly hosted the event.)	Los Angeles, CA (4)	LeBron James (3); Cleveland Cavaliers
2019	Team LeBron 178 – 164 Team Giannis	Spectrum Center	Charlotte, NC (2)	Kevin Durant (2); Golden State Warriors
2020	Team LeBron 157 – 155 Team Giannis ‡	United Center	Chicago, IL (3)	Kawhi Leonard; Los Angeles Clippers
2021	Team LeBron 170 – 150 Team Durant	State Farm Arena (2)	Atlanta, GA (3)	Giannis Antetokounmpo; Milwaukee Bucks
2022	Team LeBron 163 – 160 Team Durant	Rocket Mortgage FieldHouse (2)	Cleveland, OH (2)	Stephen Curry; Golden State Warriors
2023	Team Giannis 184 – 175 Team LeBron	Vivint Arena (2)	Salt Lake City, UT (2)	Jayson Tatum; Boston Celtics
2024	East 211 – 186 West	Gainbridge Fieldhouse (Note: The Slam Dunk Contest and Three-Point Contest, among other side events, took place at Lucas Oil Stadium.)	Indianapolis, IN (2)	Damian Lillard; Milwaukee Bucks
2025	Semifinal 1 Chuck's Global Stars 41 – 32 Kenny's Young Stars Semifinal 2 Shaq's OGs 42 – 35 Candace's Rising Stars Championship; Shaq's OGs 41 – 25 Chuck's Global Stars	Chase Center	San Francisco, CA	Stephen Curry (2); Golden State Warriors
2026	Round-robin 1 USA Stars 37 – 35 Team World (Overtime) Round-robin 2 USA Stripes 42 – 40 USA Stars Round-robin 3 USA Stripes 48 – 45 Team World Championship; USA Stars 47 – 21 USA Stripes	Intuit Dome	Inglewood, CA (3)	Anthony Edwards; Minnesota Timberwolves
2027	United States vs. Rest of the World	Mortgage Matchup Center (3)	Phoenix, AZ (4)	

Notes

- * – a city without an NBA team in play during that calendar year.
- ** – a game played at the "third" Madison Square Garden on 8th Avenue between 49th and 50th Streets, site of the first three NBA All-Star Games played in Madison Square Garden (1954, 1955 and 1968).
- *** – a game played at the "fourth" (as of 2017) Madison Square Garden that runs from 31st to 33rd Streets from 8th to west of 7th Avenues above the western half of Penn Station in Manhattan that opened in February 1968, approximately one month after the 1968 game was played in the "old" MSG.
- † – an NBA All-Star Game that is held at an NFL or MLB stadium.
- § – a stadium or arena whose venue name has since changed AND the venue has hosted a subsequent NBA All-Star Game under the alternate name.
- Portland, Sacramento, Memphis, and Oklahoma City are the only NBA cities that have not yet hosted an NBA All-Star Game. (Note: Although Brooklyn has not hosted an All-Star Game (Barclays Center did host the Rising Stars Challenge and All-Star Saturday events in 2015), New York City has hosted at the third and current Madison Square Gardens, both home to the New York Knicks.) The Kings did host 2 All-Star Games when they were in Rochester in 1956 and in Cincinnati in 1966 when they were the Royals, and the Thunder had hosted it twice when they were in Seattle in 1974 and 1987 when they were the SuperSonics. Thus leaving the Portland Trail Blazers and the Memphis Grizzlies as the only two franchises never to play host to an NBA All-Star Game.
- Despite playing in Los Angeles since 1984, the Clippers never hosted an All-Star Game individually until 2026 with the game set to play at Intuit Dome in Inglewood. The team previously co-hosted the 2004, 2011 and 2018 games with the Lakers at Crypto.com Arena (formerly Staples Center), due to being co-tenants of the arena. Its previous incarnation, the Buffalo Braves, never hosted an All-Star Game.
- New arenas that have not hosted the All-Star Game are Fiserv Forum in Milwaukee, TD Garden in Boston, Kaseya Center in Miami, American Airlines Center in Dallas (the venue did host the 2010 Rookie Challenge and All-Star Saturday), Frost Bank Center in San Antonio, FedExForum in Memphis, Little Caesars Arena in Detroit, and Golden 1 Center in Sacramento.
- Market Square Arena in Indianapolis and The Summit in Houston were the only former NBA arenas to host All-Star Saturday but not the All-Star Game as the latter took place in bigger venues within their respective cities, in this case the Hoosier Dome and the Astrodome.
- Other NFL or MLB stadiums that could host the NBA All-Star Game include Mercedes-Benz Stadium in Atlanta, Ford Field in Detroit, NRG Stadium in Houston, Lucas Oil Stadium in Indianapolis, SoFi Stadium in Inglewood (Los Angeles metropolitan area), U.S. Bank Stadium in Minneapolis, Caesars Superdome in New Orleans, State Farm Stadium in Glendale (Phoenix metropolitan area), and Rogers Centre in Toronto. Lucas Oil Stadium, however, would host the 2024 NBA All-Star Saturday Night events.
- # – Arlington, Texas does not have an NBA team within its city limits, but it is a part of the Dallas–Fort Worth metroplex that has an NBA team (the Dallas Mavericks).
- ‡ – the first game played under the Elam scoring format, where instead of a time limit, the fourth quarter would end when either team reached the target score, defined as 24, in honor of Kobe Bryant, plus whichever team had more points after three quarters. Team Giannis led 133–124 after three quarters, so the target score was 157. Anthony Davis hit a walk-off free throw to win it.

== Other All-Star events ==
The All-Star Game is the featured event of All-Star Weekend, and it is held on a Sunday night. All-Star Weekend also features popular exhibition games and competitions featuring NBA players, celebrities, and alumni as well as players from the Women's National Basketball Association (WNBA) and NBA G League (G League).

== See also ==
- ABA All-Star Game
- NBA–ABA All-Star Game
- List of NBA All-Stars
- WNBA All-Star Game
