= Astrodome =

Stadium in Houston, Texas, US

Reliant Astrodome
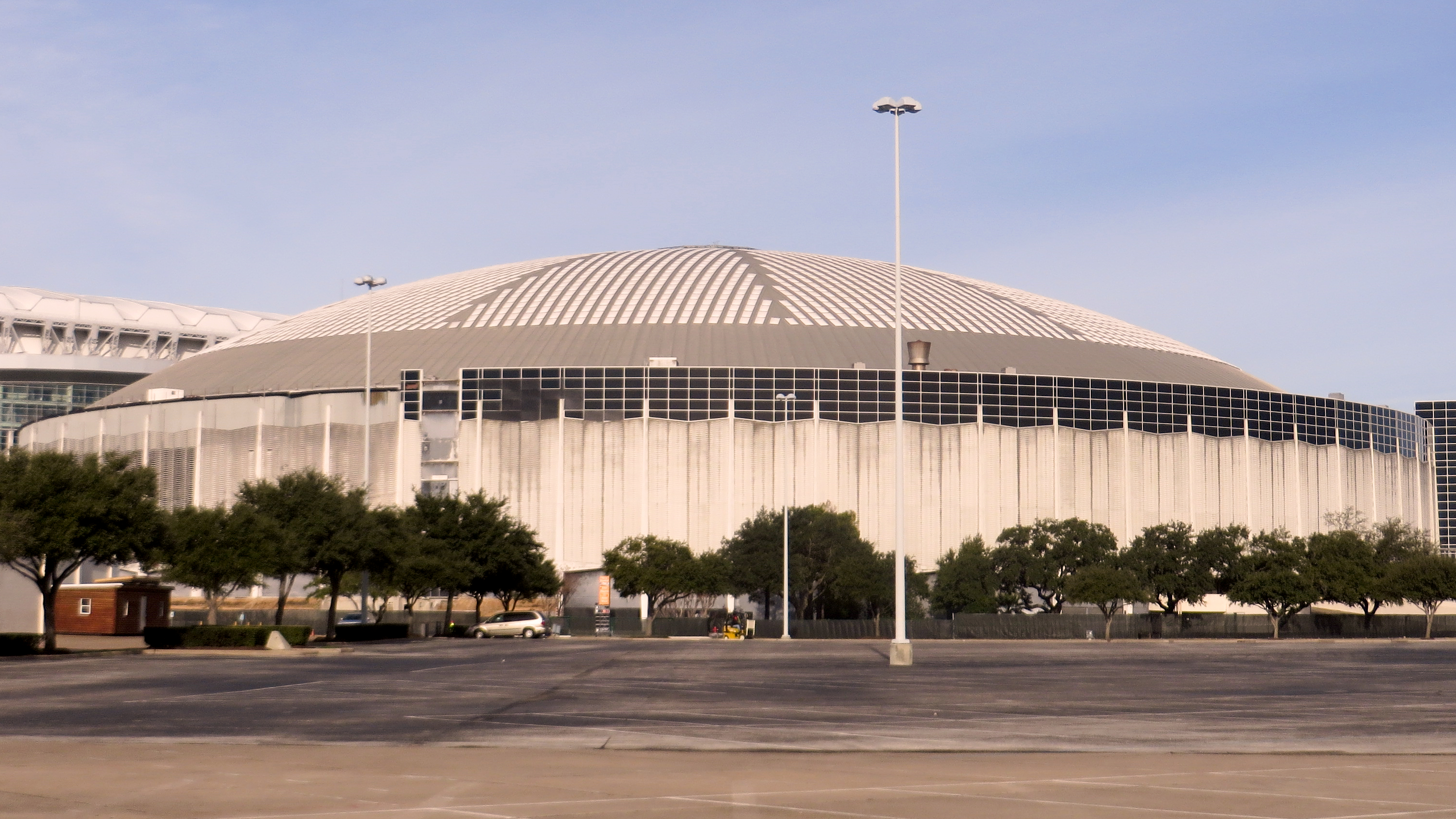
- Astrodome in 2014
- Interactive map of Reliant Astrodome
- Former names: Harris County Domed Stadium (1965); Houston Astrodome (1965–2000); Reliant Astrodome (2000–2014, August 2026–present); NRG Astrodome (2014–July 2026)
- Address: 8400 Kirby Drive
- Location: Houston, Texas, U.S.
- Coordinates: 29°41′6″N 95°24′28″W
- Owner: Harris County
- Operator: Astrodome USA
- Surface: Grass (1965); Painted dirt (1965); AstroTurf (1966–present)
- Record attendance: George Strait concert, 68,266
- Field size: Original; Left field – 340 ft (104 m); Left center – 375 ft (114 m); Center field – 406 ft (124 m); Right center – 375 ft (114 m); Right field – 340 ft (104 m); Backstop – 60.5 ft (18 m); Final; Left field – 325 ft (99 m); Left center – 375 ft (114 m); Center field – 400 ft (122 m); Right center – 375 ft (114 m); Right field – 325 ft (99 m); Backstop – 52 ft (16 m)
- Public transit: Stadium Park/Astrodome

Construction
- Groundbreaking: January 3, 1962
- Built: March 18, 1963–November 1964
- Opened: April 9, 1965
- Renovated: 1988–1989
- Closed: March 22, 2008
- Demolished: April 30, 2013 (partial)
- Cost: US$35 million ($358 million in 2025 dollars)
- Architects: Hermon Lloyd & W. B. Morgan; Wilson, Morris, Crain & Anderson; Praeger-Kavanagh-Waterbury
- Structural engineer: Walter P Moore
- Services engineers: I.A. Naman Associates, Inc.; John G. Turney & Associates
- General contractors: H. A. Lott, Inc.

Tenants
- Houston Astros (MLB) 1965–1999; Houston Cougars (NCAA) 1965–1997; Houston Livestock Show and Rodeo 1966–2002; Houston Stars (USA/NASL) 1967–1968; Houston Oilers (AFL/NFL) 1968–1996; Bluebonnet Bowl (NCAA) 1968–1984, 1987; Texas Southern Tigers (NCAA) 1968–2004; Houston Rockets (NBA) 1971–1975; Houston Texans (WFL) 1974; Houston Hurricane (NASL) 1978–1980; Houston Gamblers (USFL) 1984–1985; Houston Bowl (NCAA) 2000–2001; Houston Energy (WPFL) 2002–2006
- The Astrodome
- U.S. National Register of Historic Places
- Texas State Antiquities Landmark
- Location within the United States Location within Texas
- NRHP reference No.: 13001099

Significant dates
- Added to NRHP: January 15, 2014
- Designated TSAL: January 27, 2017

The Houston Astrodome, officially the Reliant Astrodome and known simply as the Astrodome, is the world's first multi-purpose, domed sports stadium, located in Houston, Texas, United States. It seated around 50,000 fans, with a record attendance of 68,266 set by a George Strait concert in 2002.

It was financed and assisted in development by Roy Hofheinz, mayor of Houston and known for pioneering modern stadiums. Construction on the stadium began in 1963, more than a year after the ceremonial groundbreaking, and it officially opened in 1965. It served as home to the Houston Astros of Major League Baseball (MLB) from 1965 until 1999, and the home to the Houston Oilers of the American Football League (AFL)/National Football League (NFL) from 1968 until 1996, and also the part-time home of the Houston Rockets of the National Basketball Association (NBA) from 1971 until 1975. Additionally, the Astrodome was the primary venue of the Houston Livestock Show and Rodeo from 1966 until 2002. When opened, it was named the Harris County Domed Stadium and was nicknamed the "Eighth Wonder of the World".

After the original natural grass playing surface died, the Astrodome became the first major sports venue to install artificial turf in 1966, which became known as AstroTurf. In another technological first, the Astrodome featured the "Astrolite", which was the first animated scoreboard. The stadium was renovated in 1988–1989, expanding seating and altering many original features.

By the 1990s, the Astrodome was becoming obsolete. Unable to secure a new stadium, Oilers owner Bud Adams moved the team to Tennessee after 1996, and became the Tennessee Titans in 1999. The Astros played at the dome through 1999, then relocated to Enron Field (now Daikin Park) in 2000.

The Houston Livestock Show and Rodeo continued to be held at the Astrodome until the opening of the adjacent Reliant Stadium in 2002 (which coincided with the debut of the Houston Texans, the team that replaced the Oilers). Although the Astrodome no longer had any primary tenants, it regularly hosted events during the early 2000s. It was used as a shelter for residents of New Orleans affected by Hurricane Katrina in 2005.

The Astrodome was declared non-compliant with fire code by the Houston Fire Department in 2008, and parts of it were demolished in 2013 after several years of disuse. In 2014, it was listed on the National Register of Historic Places, preventing full demolition as a result. As of 2024, most of the Astrodome structure was still standing, but it has been closed to the public since 2009 and is currently being used as a storage facility for the surrounding Reliant Park. Various plans to redevelop the Astrodome have been proposed since the structure was abandoned.

== History ==
=== Conception ===
Major League Baseball expanded to Houston in 1960, when the National League agreed to add two teams. The Houston Colt .45s (renamed the Astros in 1965) were to begin play in 1962, along with their expansion brethren New York Mets. Roy Hofheinz, a former mayor of Houston, and his group were granted the franchise after they promised to build a covered stadium. It was thought a covered stadium was a must for a major league team to be viable in Houston due to the area's subtropical climate and hot summers. Game-time temperatures are usually above 97 °F (36 °C) in July and August, with high humidity and frequent rain. Hofheinz claimed inspiration for what became the Astrodome from a tour of Rome, where he learned that the builders of the ancient Colosseum installed a giant velarium (fabric awning) to shield spectators from the sun.

The Astrodome was conceived by Hofheinz as early as 1952, when he and his daughter Dene were rained out once too often at Buffalo Stadium, home of Houston's minor league baseball team, the Houston Buffs. Hofheinz abandoned his interest in The Galleria, and set his sights on bringing major league baseball to Houston.

=== Design and construction ===
The county commissioner was positively indignant at the way everybody, particularly the news media, kept calling the new county facility by the wrong name. "The county built it and the county paid for it," he loudly complained to a packed hearing room, "and, dam[n ]it, the county owns it!" Growing purplish, the commissioner blustered that "People by God ought to start calling it by its right name: The Harris County Domed Stadium!!"
"Well," soothed the agreeable Judge, "you can call it whatever you wanta call it." With the temperate grace of a statesman he smiled amicably, puffed his cigar and added, "But the World is gonna know it as the Astrodome."

— "An Astrofable" (April 1975), Texas Monthly

The Astrodome was designed by architects Hermon Lloyd & W. B. Morgan, and Wilson, Morris, Crain and Anderson (Morris Architects). Structural engineering and structural design were performed by Walter P Moore Engineers and Consultants of Houston. Credit for the design work on the dome roof structural goes to Dr. G. R. Kiewitt and Mr. Louis O. Bass of Roof Structures, Inc. It was constructed by H. A. Lott, Inc. for Harris County. It stands 18 stories tall, covering 9.5 acres (3.8 ha). The dome is 710 feet (220 m) in diameter and the ceiling is 208 feet (63 m) above the playing surface, which itself sits 25 feet (7.6 m) below street level.

The air conditioning system was designed by I. A. Naman; other aspects that were considered included visibility (which could be reduced by cigarette smoke), light admittance, and acoustics (requiring approximately 1/2 the roof area to be covered with sound-absorbing materials), the air handling units were designed to move 2,500,000 ft^{3}/min (1,200 m^{3}/s) of air, with approximately 10% of that being fresh air from outside to limit carbon dioxide buildup.

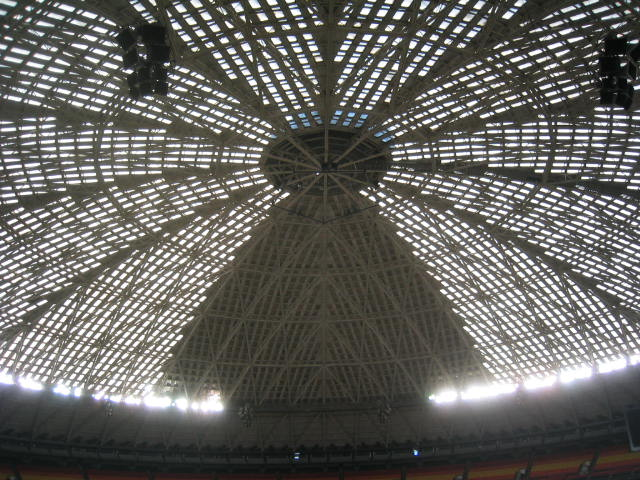
Astrodome Skylights

The scoreboard, eventually known as the "Astrolite", was designed by Fair Play Scoreboards of Des Moines, Iowa. Having designed the scoreboard for Dodger Stadium several years prior, team owner Roy Hofheinz was not impressed with the initial proposal for a much more generic type of scoreboard. Project designer Jack Foster teamed up with a creative professional based in Kansas City to create the first animated scoreboard. Its reported cost was $2.1 million.

The Dome was completed in November 1964, six months ahead of schedule. Many engineering changes were required during construction, including the modest flattening of the supposed "hemispherical roof" to cope with environmentally induced structural deformation and the use of a new paving process called "lime stabilization" to cope with changes in the chemistry of the soil. The air conditioning system was designed by Houston mechanical engineers Israel A. Naman and Jack Boyd Buckley of I. A. Naman + Associates.

The multi-purpose stadium, designed to facilitate both football and baseball, is nearly circular and uses movable lower seating areas. It also ushered in the era of other fully domed stadiums, such as the Caesars Superdome in New Orleans, as well as the all now-demolished Pontiac Silverdome near Detroit, Georgia Dome in Atlanta, Hubert H. Humphrey Metrodome in Minneapolis, Kingdome in Seattle, and RCA Dome in Indianapolis.

To test what effect the enclosed air-conditioned environment might have on the delivery of breaking balls, Satchel Paige, in full Astros uniform, threw the first pitches at the Astrodome on February 7, 1965. He later concluded that it was a "pitcher's paradise", as the lack of wind allowed for greater control of sensitive pitches.

Hofheinz had an opulent apartment in the Dome, which was removed when the facility was remodeled in 1988. The seven-floor apartment was adjacent to the right field bleachers and included a shooting gallery, a bowling alley, a chapel, and a presidential suite.

=== Opening and reception ===
The stadium's opening day took place on April 9, 1965. A sold-out crowd of 47,879 watched an exhibition game between the Astros and the New York Yankees. President Lyndon B. Johnson and his wife Lady Bird were in attendance, as well as Governor John Connally and Mayor Louie Welch. Governor Connally tossed out the first ball for the first indoor MLB game. Dick "Turk" Farrell of the Astros threw the first pitch. The Yankees' Mickey Mantle had both the first hit (a single) and the first home run in the Astrodome, but the Astros won 2–1 in twelve innings.

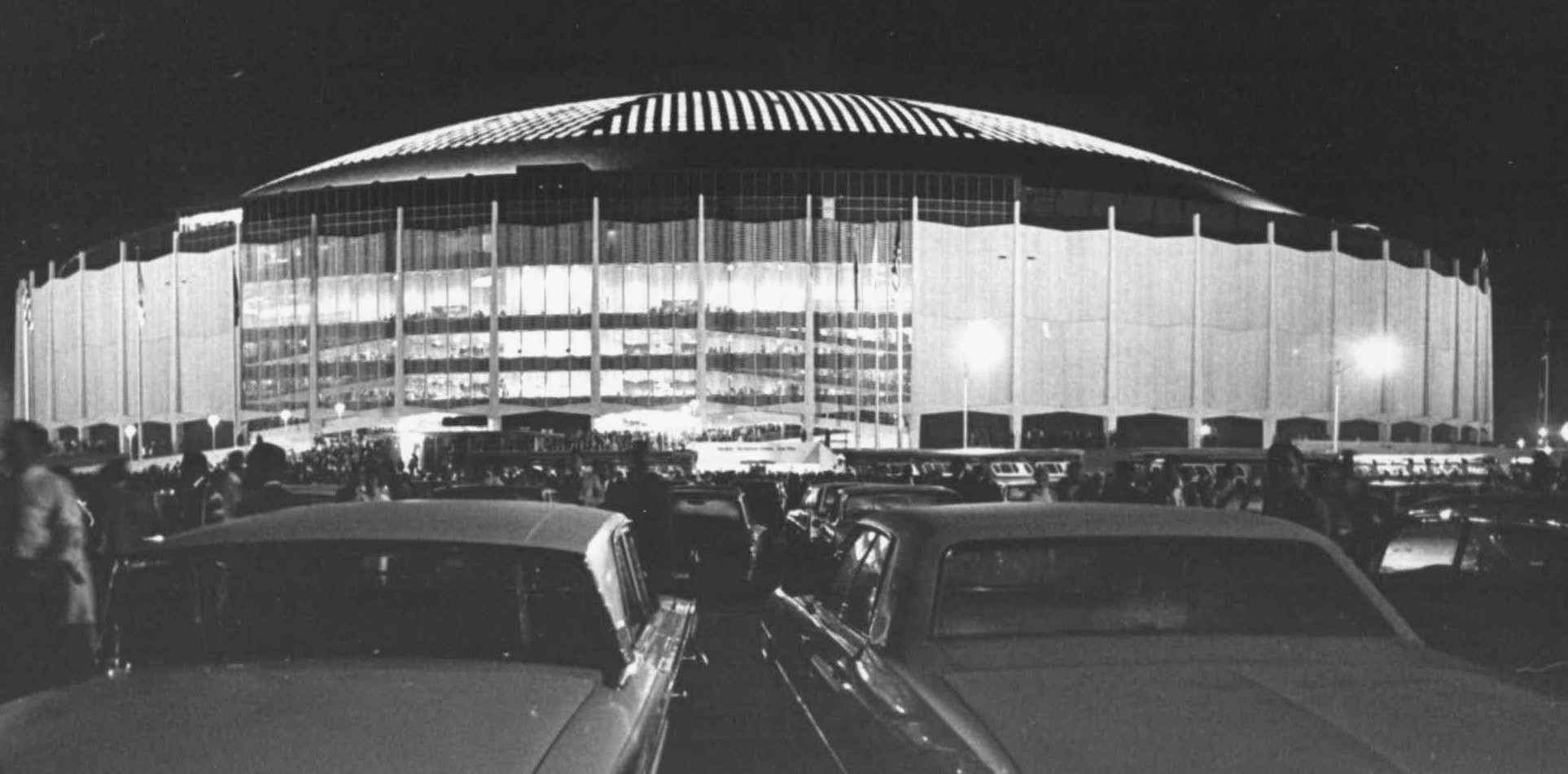
The Astrodome in 1965

President Johnson stopped at the Astrodome that evening en route to his home in Johnson City and paid his respects to baseball and Astros president Roy Hofheinz, a campaign manager for Johnson in the 1940s, just as the second inning got underway. He and Lady Bird watched the opening night game from behind the glass in Judge Hofheinz's private box high in the right field just to the right of the giant scoreboard. LBJ ate hors d'œuvres and chicken and ice cream while watching the game.

"Roy, I want to congratulate you; it shows so much imagination," he was heard to say. Later, he called the stadium "massive" and "beautiful." Although the president's visit overshadowed all others, dignitaries swarmed through the "Eighth Wonder of the World" during the three days of the exhibition series and for opening night against the Phillies on April 12. Chris Short of the Phillies shut out the Astros on four hits, with 12 strikeouts.

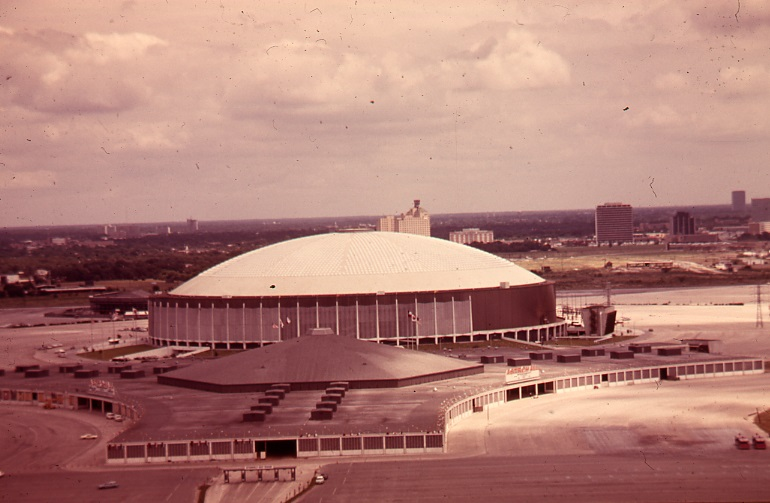
View of the Astrodome in the late 1970s. The structure in the foreground is the Astrohall, which served as a convention and exhibit center until its demolition in 2002.

The first artist to play the Astrodome was Judy Garland on December 17, 1965; The Supremes were her opening act, and tickets were priced $1.00 to $7.50. The dome seated 48,000, and another 12,000 seats were added for this show. Paid $43,000 for the one show, Garland appeared on stage at 10 p.m. and sang for forty minutes, with her set of songs including: "He's Got the Whole World in His Hands"; "Just in Time"; "My Kind of Town, Houston Is"/"Houston"; "As Long As He Needs Me"; "Joey, Joey, Joey"; "Do it Again"; "What Now My Love?"; "By Myself"; "Rock-A-Bye Your Baby"; "San Francisco"; "Chicago"; and "Over the Rainbow." Mort Lindsey conducted.

=== "The Rainout" ===
The Astrodome suffered a rainout on June 15, 1976. The Astros' scheduled game against the Pittsburgh Pirates was called when massive flooding in the Houston area prevented all but a few fans from reaching the stadium. Both teams had arrived early for practice, but the umpires were several hours late. At 5 pm that day, with only a handful of fans on hand and already several hours behind, the umpires and teams agreed to call the game off. Tables were brought onto the field and the teams ate dinner together. Although the Astros still had a home series with Pittsburgh in August, this game was made up in Pittsburgh in July.

=== Recent history ===
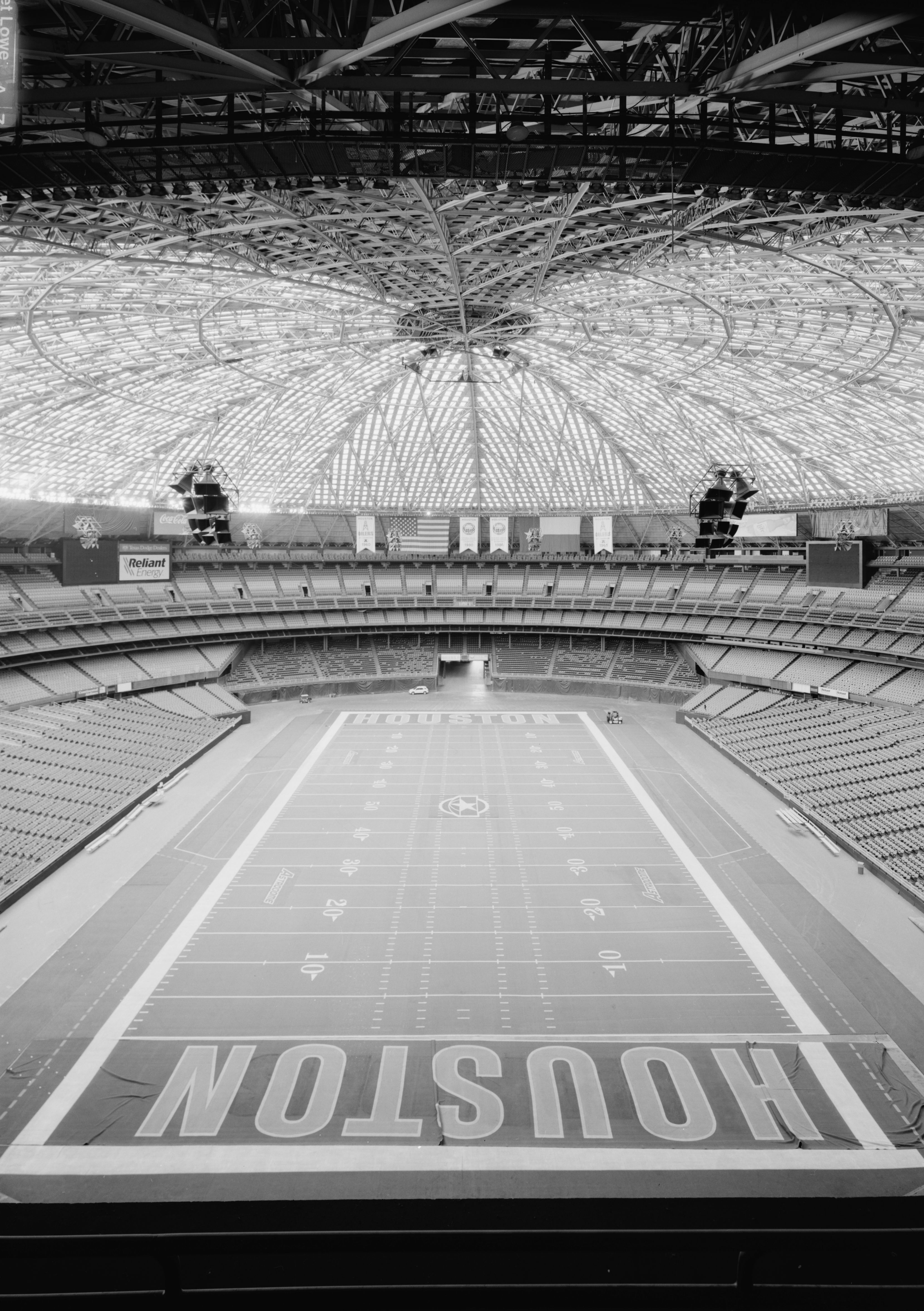
The Astrodome interior in 2004

In 1989, four cylindrical pedestrian ramp columns were constructed outside the Dome for accessibility. This enabled the Astrodome to comply with the Americans with Disabilities Act of 1990.

The 1992 Republican National Convention was held at the Astrodome in August of that year. The Astros accommodated the convention by taking a month-long road trip. A manually operated scoreboard debuted that season.

On August 19, 1995, a scheduled preseason game between the Oilers and the San Diego Chargers had to be canceled due to the dilapidated condition of the playing field. Oilers owner Bud Adams demanded a new stadium, but the city of Houston refused to fund it. After years of threats, Adams moved the team to Nashville, Tennessee after the 1996 season. Around that time the Astros also threatened to leave the city unless a new ballpark was built. The retractable-roofed Enron Field (now known as Daikin Park) opened for the 2000 season in downtown Houston.

One of the largest crowds in the Astrodome's history, more than 66,746 fans, came on Sunday, February 26, 1995, to see Tejano superstar Selena and her band Los Dinos perform for a sell-out crowd during the Houston Livestock Show and Rodeo. Selena y Los Dinos performed two consecutive times before at the Astrodome, breaking previous attendance records each time. This was Selena's last televised concert before she was fatally shot on March 31, 1995, by her fan club president.

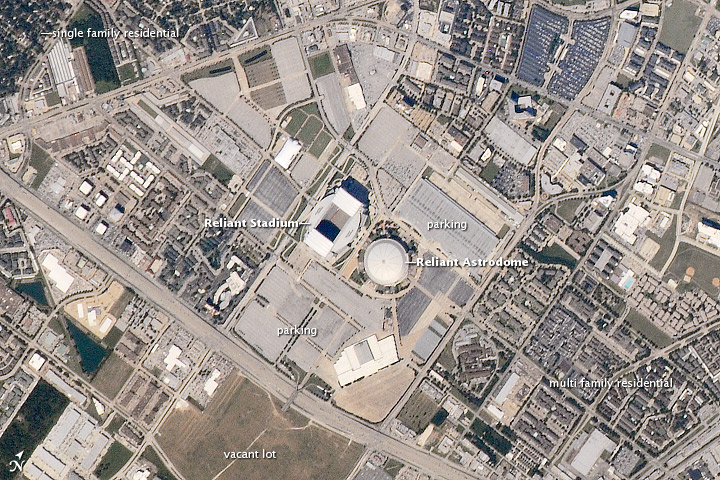
Reliant Park area, Houston, Texas. Astrodome, with Reliant Stadium at center of this 2010 astronaut photo

The Astrodome was joined by a new neighbor in 2002, the retractable-roofed Reliant Stadium, which was built to house Houston's new NFL franchise, the Houston Texans. The Houston Livestock Show and Rodeo moved to the new venue in 2003, leaving the Astrodome without any major tenants. The last concert at the Astrodome was George Strait & the Ace in the Hole Band during the 2002 Houston Livestock Show and Rodeo, before a record crowd of 68,266; the performance was recorded in For the Last Time: Live from the Astrodome.

=== Hurricane Katrina ===
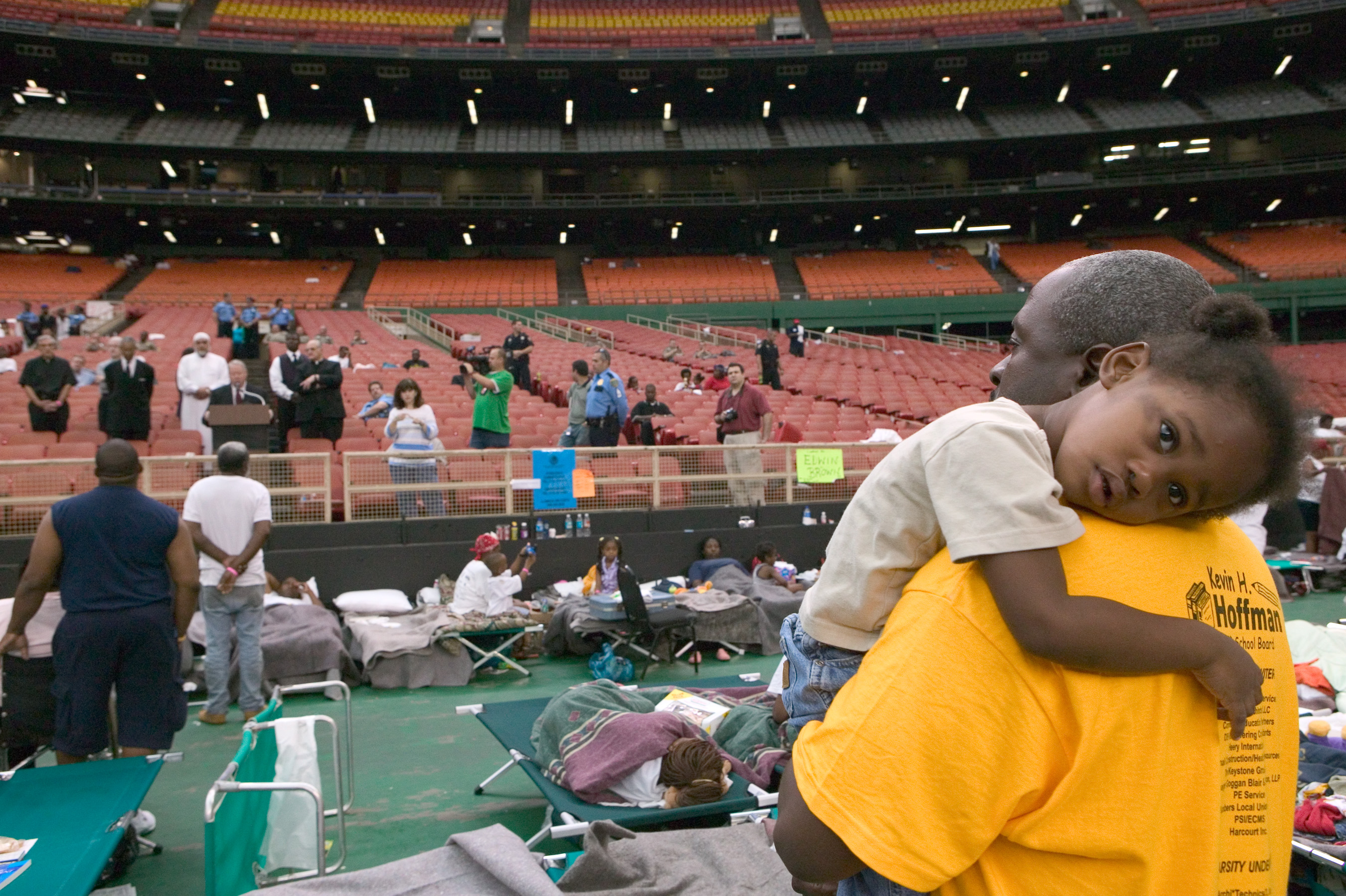
Survivors of Katrina in the Astrodome, 2005

On August 31, 2005, in the wake of Hurricane Katrina, the Harris County Department of Homeland Security and Emergency Management and the State of Louisiana came to an agreement to allow at least 25,000 evacuees from New Orleans, especially those that were sheltered in the Louisiana Superdome, to move to the Astrodome until they could return home. The evacuation began on September 1, 2005. All scheduled events for the final four months of 2005 at the Astrodome were cancelled. Overflow refugees were held in the surrounding Reliant Park complex. There was a full field hospital inside the Reliant Arena, which cared for the entire Katrina evacuee community.

The entire Reliant Park complex was scheduled to be emptied of hurricane evacuees by September 17, 2005. Originally, the Astrodome was planned to be used to house evacuees until December. However, the surrounding parking lots were needed for the first Houston Texans home game. Arrangements were made to help Katrina evacuees find apartments both in Houston and elsewhere in the United States. By September 16, 2005, the last of the hurricane evacuees living in the Astrodome had been moved out either to the neighboring Reliant Arena or to permanent housing north of Houston. As of September 20, 2005, the remaining Katrina evacuees were relocated to Arkansas due to Hurricane Rita.

== Closure ==
In 2008, the facility was cited for numerous code violations. Since then, only maintenance workers and security guards have been allowed to enter the stadium while it is brought up to code. The city council rejected demolition plans on environmental grounds, over concerns that demolition of the Dome might damage the dense development that today closely surrounds it.

== Refurbishment plans ==
Numerous renovation/refurbishment plans for the dome have been presented over the years. Houston's plan to host the 2012 Summer Olympics included renovating the Astrodome for use as an Olympic Stadium hosting the ceremonies, athletics and soccer finals. Houston became one of the USOC's bid finalists, but the organization chose New York City as its candidate city, and the 2012 Summer Olympic Games were held in London, Great Britain by the IOC.

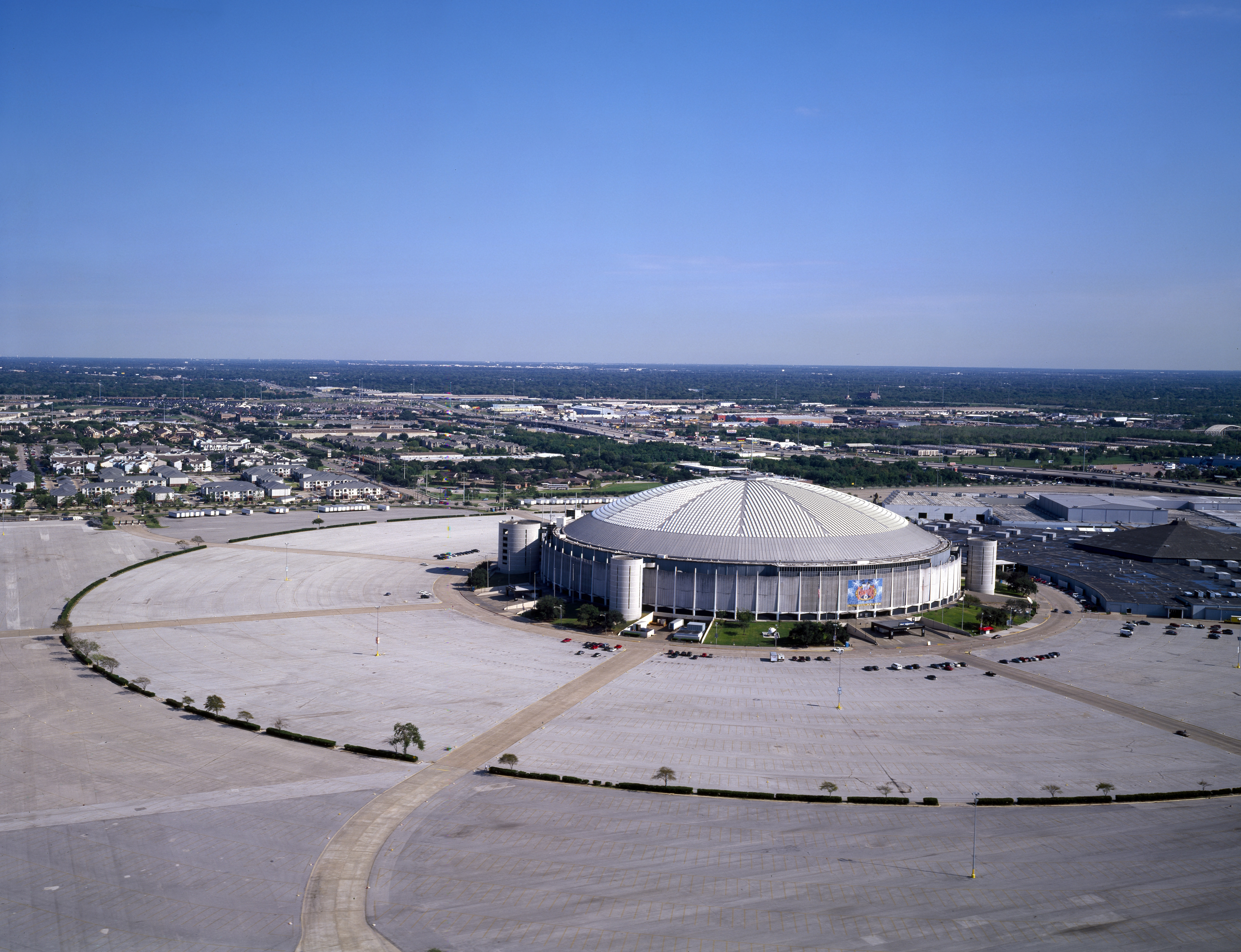
An aerial view of the Astrodome in 1999

Plans to convert the Astrodome into a luxury hotel were rejected. A proposal to convert the Astrodome into a movie production studio was also considered but rejected. Regardless of the type of renovation, all renovation plans must deal with the problem of occupancy code violations that have basically shuttered the Astrodome for the near future.

In June 2013, a comprehensive plan was unveiled that would have seen the aging structure undergo an almost $200 million renovation into a multi-purpose event/convention facility. The measure would have to have been approved first through a bond election in Harris County for the publicly funded project to go forward or else, officials warned, the iconic structure would be demolished. Voters ended up rejecting the measure on November 5, 2013.

=== 2013 referendum and aftermath ===
On November 5, 2013, voters in Houston turned down a $213 million referendum to renovate and convert the Astrodome into a state-of-the-art convention center and exhibition space known as "New Dome Experience". Until a final disposition is made, Harris County commissioners will not approve demolition of the dome. "The building's still there. There's no formal plan or authorization to demolish the building, and until somebody brings such a plan to fruition, there's a chance," according to Willie Loston, executive director of the Harris County Sports and Convention Corporation. "The proposal was rejected by the voters. We're back to where we were. Square one," according to Steve Radack, Harris County commissioner.

Three exterior pedestrian ramp towers were demolished on December 8, 2013. Around that time, the ramp bridges were disconnected from the main structure and the surrounding grass berms were lowered. The ticket booths were also removed along with the interior seats. The demolition was planned prior to the referendum.

=== Astrodome Indoor City Park ===
After the failed bond election of 2013, the county went back to the drawing board and in August 2014 the County Commissioners Court announced a new plan to save and rejuvenate the Astrodome. The new concept centered around leaving the Dome's roof intact and converting the Astrodome's vast central space into a covered semi-climate-controlled city park that could have flexible uses for both public recreation and gatherings such as festivals and concerts. The remainder of the complex would have been redeveloped over time using a combination of public and private funds and include elements such as an educational exploration area to encourage students to learn about the sciences and engineering and possibly meeting, exhibition, and restaurant areas that would not only serve the general public, but could also add value to the Houston Texans' Game Day Experiences and be used by the Rodeo. A key element of this proposal centered around the ability for the county to proceed with the initial phases of the project using existing funds without having to seek voter approval for an expensive bond referendum. However, this plan failed as well.

=== Astrodome Revitalization Project ===
After the failed plans of past years, the Astrodome Revitalization Project was proposed in September 2016. This plan would turn the dome into a massive underground parking garage. Specifically, the first step would raise the dome floor and use the space underneath that as parking, leaving the floor above for other uses. On September 27, 2016, the Harris County Commissioners approved the first part of the plan. This marked a major turning point for the dome, as some feared if the plan wasn't approved the building would be demolished.

In January 2017, the Texas Historical Commission voted unanimously to designate the dome a State Antiquities Landmark. Under the designation, the Astrodome may no longer be removed, altered, damaged, salvaged, or excavated without a permit from the commission. The Harris County Commissioners voted to approve a $105 million renovation plan on February 13, 2018. This plan keeps the parking garage from the Revitalization Project. Construction was set to start in October 2018 and would be completed sometime in 2020.

The construction start date was later moved to early 2019 and was expected to finish in 2020. In September 2019, the plan was put on hold with no word when construction might take place. It was announced in November 2019 that the Revitalization Project has been scrapped by Commissioners Court Judge Lina Hidalgo. Hidalgo explained that "The plan that had been designed wouldn't have yielded truly a usable building".

=== Vision Astrodome ===
The latest project to revitalize the structure came in 2024 from the nonprofit Astrodome Conservancy, which would convert it into a multiuse destination with an arena, an elevated pedestrian boulevard, retail shops, restaurants and a hotel.

== Notable events ==
'Game of the Century'

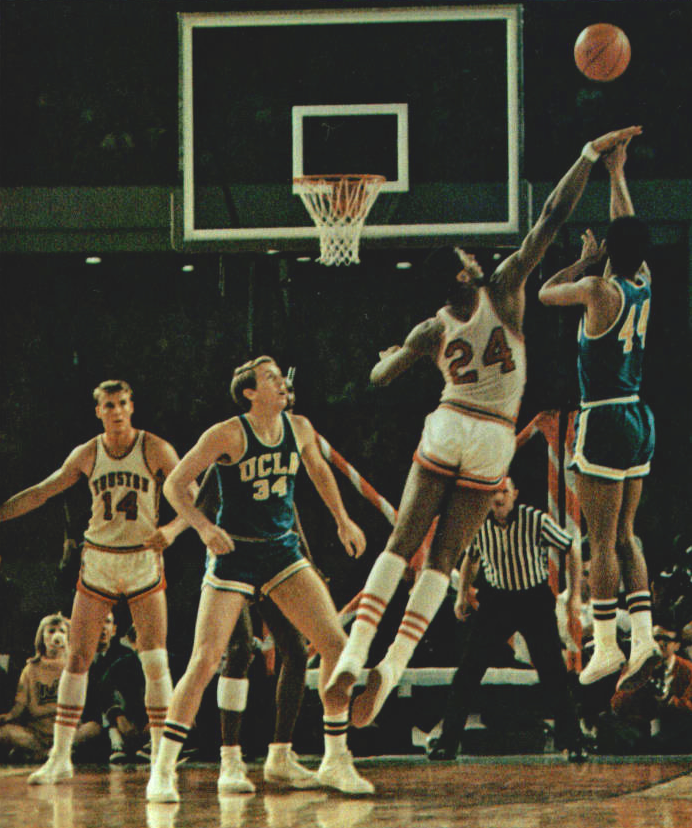
Houston and UCLA play against each other in the 1968 Game of the Century at the Astrodome

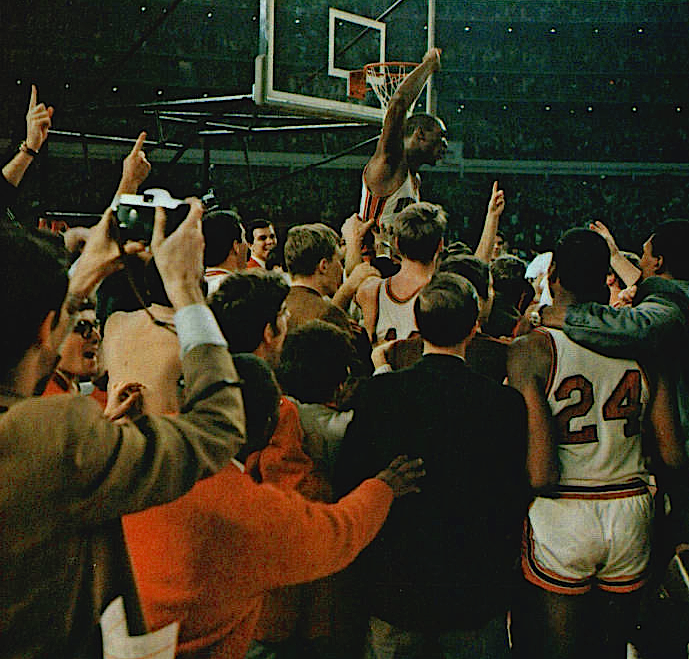
The aftermath of Houston's 71–69 victory over UCLA

=== Baseball ===
- The first home run in the Astrodome was hit by Mickey Mantle off pitcher Turk Farrell on April 9, 1965, in an exhibition game between the Astros and Yankees. The first official home run was hit by Dick Allen of the Philadelphia Phillies in a game on April 12 of that year—a 2–0 Astros loss.
- Lindsey Nelson, an announcer for the visiting New York Mets, broadcast a game on April 28, 1965, while perched in a gondola suspended from the roof above second base.
- On September 19, 1979, during a "Back the Astros" night, KILT (AM) radio announced that the Astros' number one fan, "Astroman," would live on top of the domed stadium and would not come down until the Astros won their first pennant. Over the next 10 days, Astroman, played by KILT-AM salesman Denver Griffith, lived on top of the Astrodome in an eight-man tent. On top of the Astrodome was also a telephone from which Griffith would report as Astroman to KILT-AM listeners throughout the day. He could retreat inside the Dome to a gondola near the ceiling for bad weather, watching a game, and deliveries. At first Astroman got his food and drink by lowering a rope with a basket the 18 stories from the top of the Astrodome to the center of the playing field. He grew tired of this and would later get deliveries at the end of the catwalk instead. At one point Griffith got so desperate for food and drink that his mother had to intervene, interrupting the NFL football coach, Bum Phillips, during practice so that she could deliver the supplies. Every night a local TV station would sign off with a shot of Astroman on top of the Astrodome waving to a circling news chopper.

Although the Astros never played in a World Series while at the Dome, they have participated in five Fall Classics at Daikin Park (2005, 2017, 2019, 2021, and 2022). By the time the Astros finally won the Series in 2017, they had switched to the American League.

- On October 15, 1986, the Astros and the visiting New York Mets played Game 6 of the 1986 NLCS. The 16-inning contest was at the time the longest game in MLB post season history. The Mets would take a 7–4 lead into the bottom of the 16th inning and hold on for a 7–6 victory over the Astros. Coincidentally, the record was broken in Houston 19 years later at Minute Maid Park during the 2005 NLDS when the Astros won an 18-inning game against the Atlanta Braves.
- On October 3, 1999, the Astros played their final regular season game at the Astrodome, clinching the NL Central Division title with a 9–4 win over the Dodgers. The final Astros game in the stadium occurred 6 days later when the Braves eliminated the Astros in Game 4 of the Division Series.

=== Basketball ===
- The 'Game of the Century' between the University of Houston Cougars and the UCLA Bruins took place at the Astrodome on January 20, 1968, before a crowd of 52,963—the record for the largest attendance ever at a basketball game until 2003. The first NCAA regular-season game broadcast nationwide in prime time, the Game of the Century established college basketball as a sports commodity on television, and paved the way for the modern "March Madness" television coverage. The Cougars, coached by Guy V. Lewis, defeated coach John Wooden's Bruins, led by Lew Alcindor, 71–69 behind a 39-point scoring effort from Elvin Hayes.
- The Astrodome hosted the 1989 NBA All-Star Game. Attendance was 44,735 and Karl Malone won MVP honors.

=== Tennis ===
The Battle of the Sexes tennis match occurred on September 20, 1973, aired on ABC with Billie Jean King defeating Bobby Riggs in three straight sets. While more of a publicity stunt than a serious match, it made national headlines and stands as a milestone in the progress of women's sports. Scenes were filmed in the Astrodome for the 2017 film Battle of the Sexes which starred Emma Stone and Steve Carell, who played King and Riggs, respectively.

=== Boxing & Professional wrestling ===
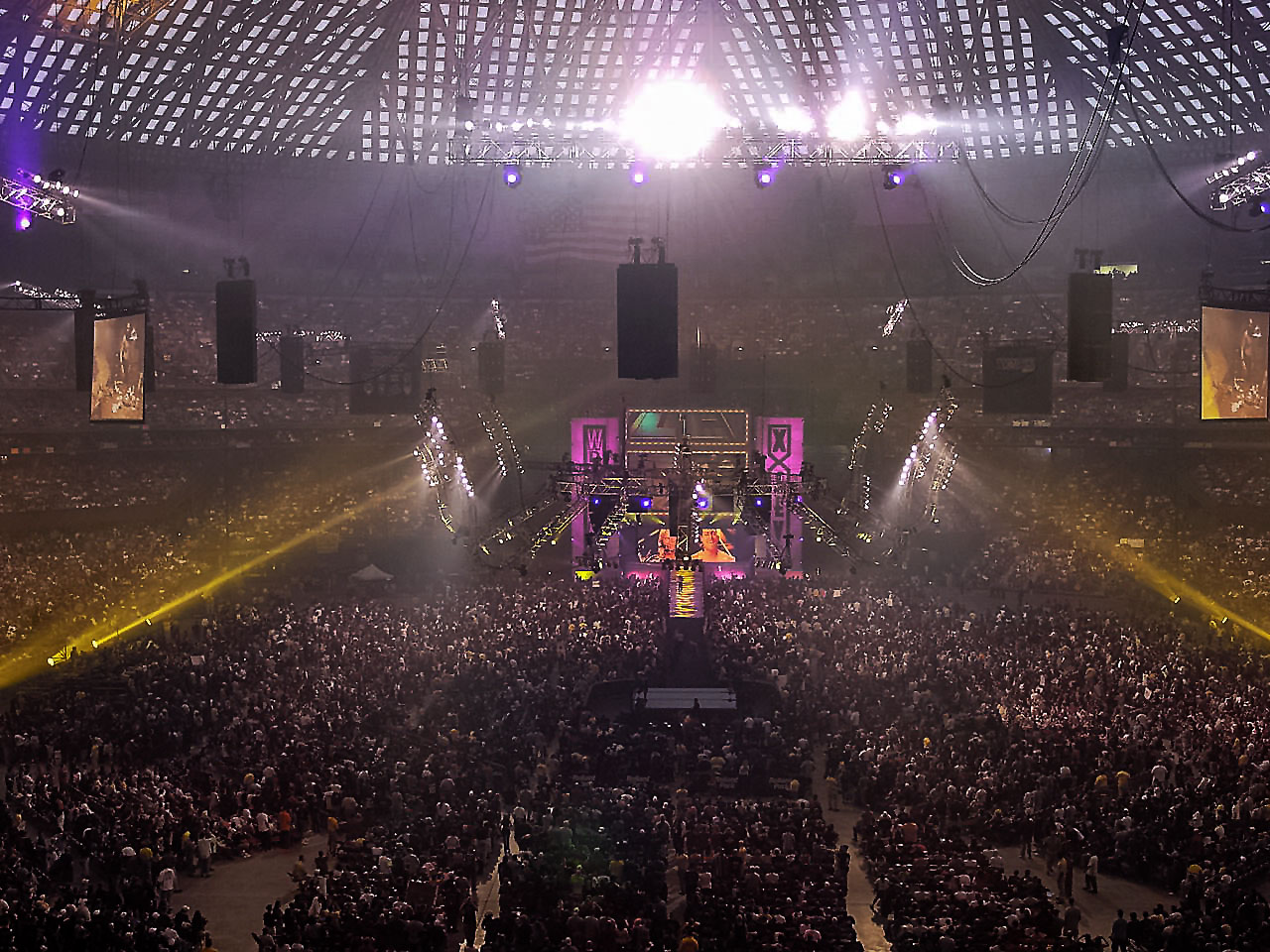
WrestleMania X-Seven set an attendance record for the Astrodome

- Three-time World Heavyweight Boxing Champion Muhammad Ali fought Cleveland Williams in the Astrodome in November 1966; Ernie Terrell in February 1967; Jimmy Ellis in July 1971; and Buster Mathis in November 1971.
- On April 1, 2001, the World Wrestling Federation (WWF, now known as WWE) hosted WrestleMania X-Seven, which set an all-time record attendance for the Astrodome of 67,925. The main event of the card saw Texas native "Stone Cold" Steve Austin challenge and defeat WWF Champion The Rock in a No Disqualification Match for the WWF Championship. The card also featured the first of Houston native The Undertaker's three WrestleMania victories over Triple H, and the second TLC match for the WWF Tag Team Championship with Edge & Christian defeating WWF Tag Team Champions The Dudley Boyz, and The Hardy Boyz. The event was met with universal acclaim, often rated as the greatest WrestleMania of all time.

=== Concerts ===
- Frank Sinatra would perform "Fly me to the Moon" as a tribute to the Apollo 11 mission astronauts on August 16, 1969. He would also perform "The Lady is a Tramp" and "God bless America". All Apollo 11 astronauts were present during this show.
- Elvis Presley gave six performances there between February and March 1970, setting an attendance record with 200,000 over the six shows. He performed there again on March 3, 1974, setting a single day attendance record.
- The first annual Astrodome Jazz Festival presented by George Wein and the Newport Jazz Festival took place on July 7–8, 1972. Performers included Ike & Tina Turner, B.B. King, Cannonball Adderley, Roberta Flack, Lou Rawls, Herbie Mann, Dave Brubeck with Paul Desmond, Jimmy Smith, and The Giants of Jazz" supergroup featuring Gerry Mulligan, Dizzy Gillespie, Thelonious Monk, Art Blakey, Kai Winding, and Al McKibbon.
- The Rolling Stones played October 28 & 29, 1981 on their American Tour 1981. They again played November 8, 1989, on the Steel Wheels/Urban Jungle Tour.
- The Jacksons performed there during their Victory Tour on two nights in November 1984. With Michael Jackson as the lead performer, the group performed on November 9, 1984, and November 10, 1984, with attendance of 80,000.
- Madonna played a concert on July 24, 1987, as part of her Who's That Girl World Tour.
- Pink Floyd played a concert on November 18, 1987, as part of their A Momentary Lapse of Reason Tour.
- September 4, 1992; Co-headlining tour of Metallica and Guns N' Roses with special guest Faith No More. News footage of this concert can be found on YouTube. Additionally, MTV filmed an episode of Live n' Loud during the show.
- Genesis played a concert at the Astrodome, as part of the We Can't Dance Tour on May 9, 1992.
- Live! The Last Concert is a live album by Mexican-American singer Selena. It was recorded on February 26, 1995, at the Houston Astrodome and was televised live on Univision. Over 67,000 people attended.
- U2 played at the Houston Astrodome during their Zoo TV Tour in 1992 and their Popmart Tour in 1997.
- On August 6, 2000, the Up in Smoke Tour came to the Astrodome.
- The last concert at the Astrodome was George Strait & the Ace in the Hole Band during the 2002 Houston Livestock Show and Rodeo, before a record crowd of 68,266.

=== Motorsports ===
The Astrodome held several motorsports events throughout its lifetime. The AMA Grand National Championship held events starting in 1968 and running for 18 years, utilizing the Short Track and TT Steeplechase track configurations in their visits. The AMA Supercross Championship held its first ever indoor Supercross at the Astrodome in 1974, won by Jim Pomeroy.

In the mid-1980s, the Mickey Thompson Entertainment Group held several Stadium Off-Road Racing Series events, showcasing such drivers as Ivan Stewart, Robby Gordon, and Walker Evans (racing driver). Beginning in the early 1980s, both TNT Motorsports and the United States Hot Rod Association held events showcasing mud bogging, truck and tractor pulling, and monster trucks in the Astrodome. After a buy-out of TNT Motorsports, the USHRA continued holding events that would later transform into the current Monster Jam events.

USAC held the Astro Grand Prix as part of the National Midget Championship in the Astrodome on a temporary 1/4-mile dirt oval—which was called the Eighth Wonder International Motor Speedway. Gary Bettenhausen and Lee Kunzman won the feature races in 1969, while Tom Bigelow won the overall event championship. The event returned for 1970, hometown favorite A. J. Foyt won the feature race. Bettenhausen won the final edition in 1972.

With the opening of Reliant Stadium in late 2002, the events held in early 2002 by AMA Supercross and Monster Jam would be their last in the Astrodome before moving next door for 2003, where they continue to hold events every year.

- KTRK-TV Channel 13 Eyewitness News anchorman Dave Ward was injured during a motocross exhibition race (which also included Channel 13 sports anchor Bob Allen, as well as other local media figures) in the Astrodome in the early 1970s.
- Evel Knievel jumped 13 cars two nights in a row, drawing over 100,000 spectators to the Astrodome in January 1971, and though there was talk of him making an actual jump over the stadium itself sometime in the future, it never happened.
- The Astro Spiral car jump was performed January 12, 1972, by Chick Galiano of J.M. Productions' Hell Drivers. This stunt was later performed in the 1974 James Bond film The Man with the Golden Gun.

Domecoming

On April 9, 2018, the Astrodome was used as a museum for the event known as "Domecoming".

=== In popular culture ===
- Robert Altman's 1970 comedy film Brewster McCloud is set at the Astrodome: the eponymous hero is an eccentric young man who lives at the stadium.
- In the "Get Your Freak Off" episode of King of the Hill, parts of the episode showed the Astrodome and took place there.
- The 1972 special Road Company was videotaped here, which starred Dom DeLuise, Bob Hynes, Sheila MacRae & Kenny Rogers.
- The Astrodome was the setting for the filming of an exhibition game with the fictional Houston Toros in the 1977 movie The Bad News Bears in Breaking Training.
- The made-for-TV movie Murder at the World Series was filmed here, about a fictional 1977 World Series between the Astros and Oakland Athletics (the real 1977 World Series featured the Yankees and Dodgers).
- In the science-fiction movie 2010: The Year We Make Contact, the 1984 sequel to 2001: A Space Odyssey, Dr. Heywood Floyd (Roy Scheider) and the spaceship Discovery's designer Walter Curnow (John Lithgow) discuss their favorite sports stadium hot dogs; Curnow says he likes the hot dogs at the Astrodome, while Floyd prefers those at Yankee Stadium.
- In 2001, U2 filmed the music video for "Stuck in a Moment You Can't Get Out Of" inside the Astrodome.
- In the 2004 movie Friday Night Lights, the Astrodome hosted the 1988 5A Football State Championship between the Permian Panthers and the Carter High Cowboys. (The actual 1988 game was a state semifinal and was played elsewhere.)
- The Astrodome is a playable field on MVP Baseball 2005 as it was in 1999.
- A fictional meeting in the Astrodome between the narrator, Pocahontas and Indian rights activist actor Marlon Brando is mentioned in the song "Pocahontas." It was written by Neil Young and was first released on his 1979 album Rust Never Sleeps.
- In the animated film Apollo 10 1/2: A Space Age Childhood, the Astrodome and its construction was featured when describing Houston in the 1960s.

== Awards and recognitions ==
- On June 19, 2013, the Astrodome was named to the National Trust for Historic Preservation's annual list of America's 11 Most Endangered Historic Places as well as to its portfolio.
- The Astrodome was added to the National Register of Historic Places in January 2014.
- The dome celebrated its 50th anniversary on April 9, 2015. A time capsule buried under the site at the time of construction was located. However, it was not extricated to celebrate the occasion, based on concerns about the cost and potential to compromise the structure of a retaining wall. This was also one of the very few times that the Astrodome has been open for the public since 2006.
- In 2017, the Texas Historical Commission designated the dome as a State Antiquities Landmark.
- On May 29, 2018, the dome received a Texas State Historical Marker from the Texas Historical Commission.

== Features ==
=== Scoreboard ===
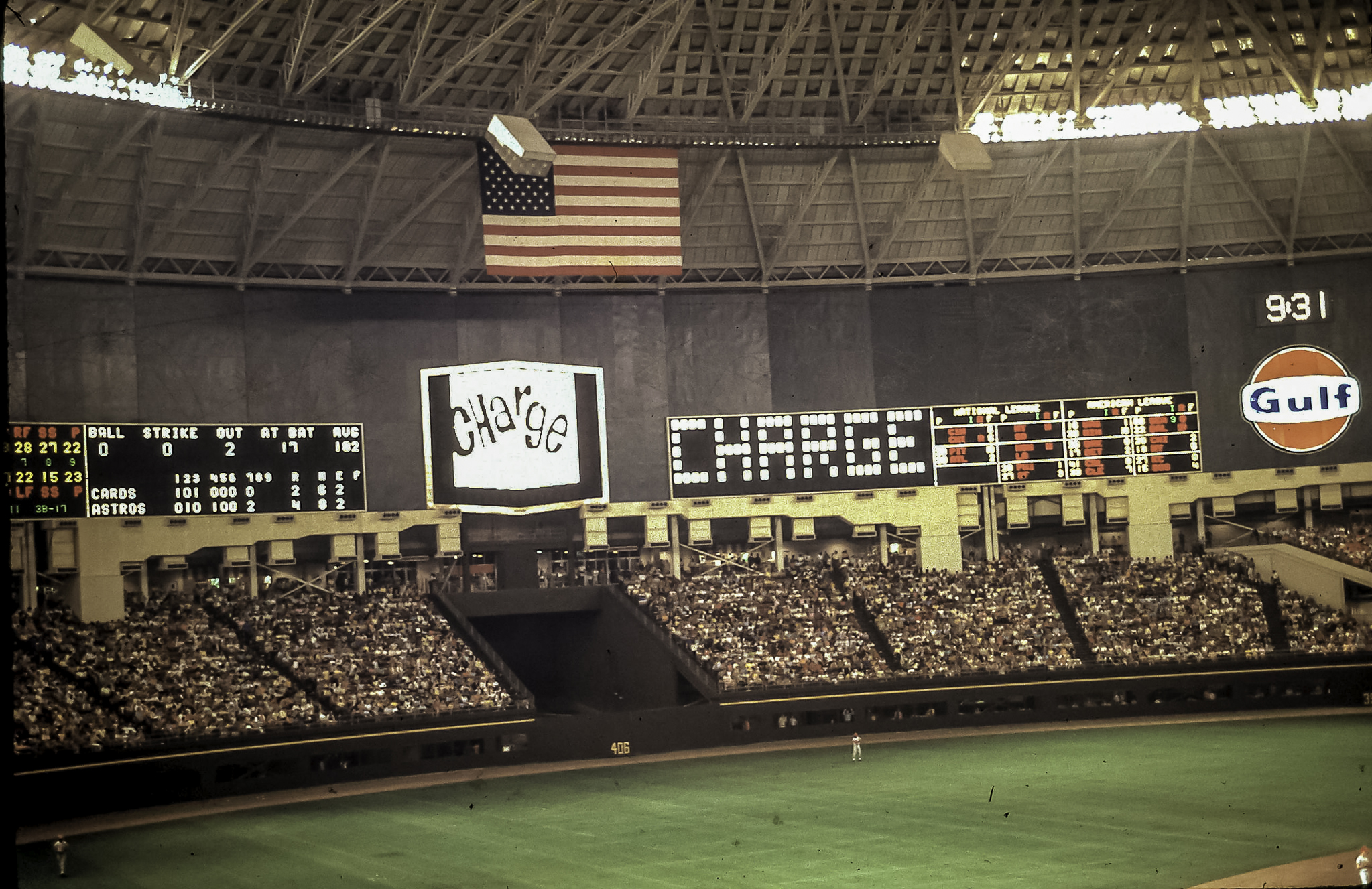
Astrolite, the Astrodome's scoreboard, in 1969. It was the world's first animated scoreboard.

The Astrodome was renowned for its four-story "Astrolite" scoreboard, composed of thousands of light bulbs that featured animation. After every Astros home run, the scoreboard played a minute-long animated celebration of pistols, bulls, and fireworks. The scoreboard remained intact until 1988, when Houston Oilers (now Tennessee Titans) owner Bud Adams suggested its removal to accommodate increased capacity for football, baseball and the Houston Livestock Show and Rodeo. Harris County spent $67 million of public funds on renovations. Approximately 15,000 new seats resembling the 1970s rainbow uniform pattern were installed to bring seating capacity to almost 60,000 for football. On September 6, 1988, a final celebration commemorating the scoreboard occurred prior to expansion renovations commencing.

=== Playing surface ===
The playing surface was originally Tifway 419 Bermuda grass, bred for indoor use. The dome ceiling contained thousands of semi-transparent Lucite panes. Players soon complained that glare from the panes made it hard for them to track fly balls; to solve the problem, two sections of panes were painted white in April. Unfortunately, within a few months the grass died from lack of sunlight. For most of the 1965 season, the Astros played on green-painted dirt and dead grass. Even before then, the grass tended to hold, then release moisture. The resulting condensation often forced games to be delayed while the grounds crews cleaned up the playing surface.

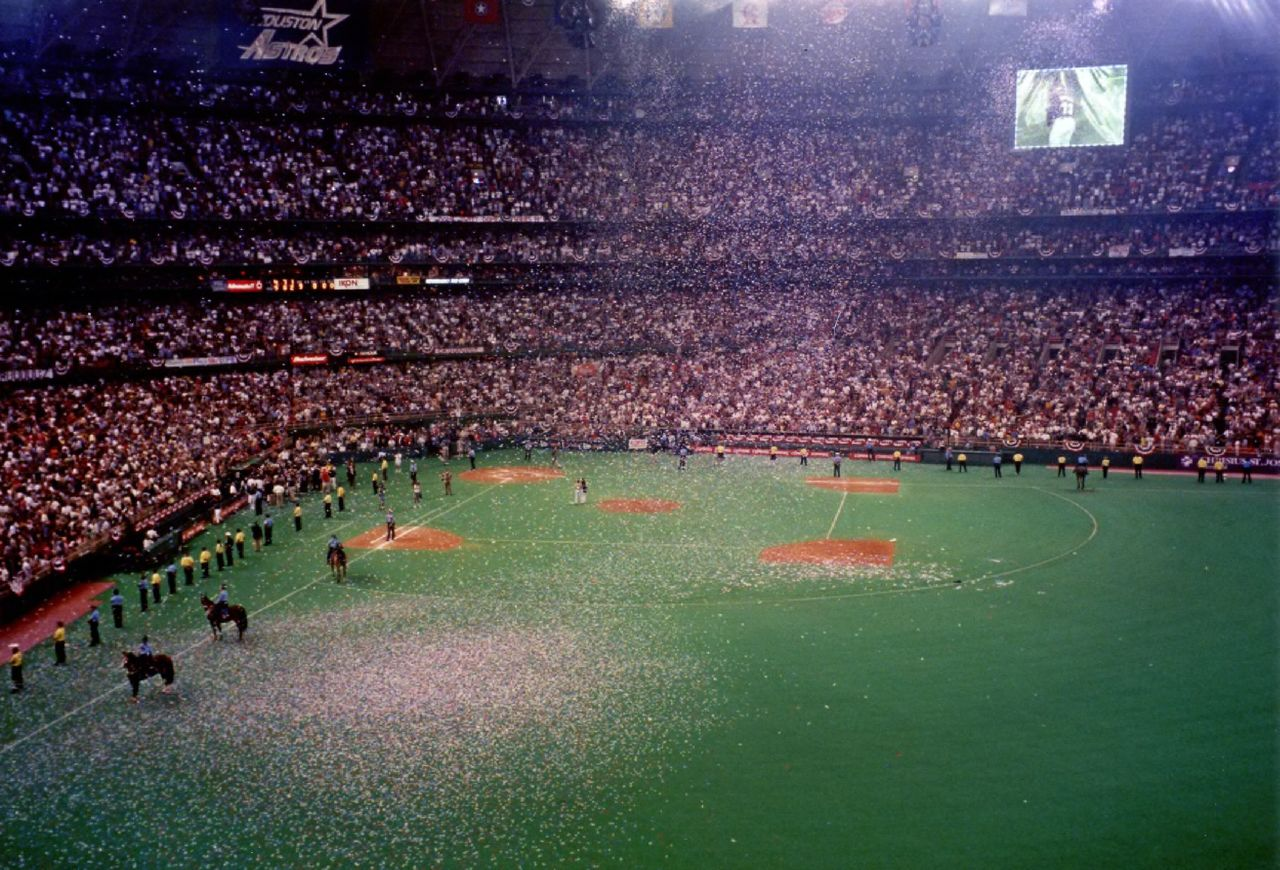
The playing surface in 1999

The solution was to install a new type of artificial grass on the field, ChemGrass, which became known as AstroTurf, named after the stadium. Because the supply of AstroTurf was limited, only a small amount was available at the start of the 1966 season. There was not enough for the entire outfield, so the first phase covered only the traditional grass portion of the infield and foul territory, at a cost of $2 per square foot. It was installed in time to test out during exhibition games against the Dodgers in March.

The outfield remained painted dirt until after the All-Star Game. The Astros completed a seven-game home stand on Wednesday, July 6, then went on a road trip on both sides of the All-Star break. The installation of the outfield portion of AstroTurf was completed for the three-game series with the Phillies starting on Tuesday, July 19, finally covering the entire field. Groundskeepers dressed as astronauts kept the turf clean with vacuum cleaners between innings. The infield design had the same large dirt arc and running paths as a traditional natural grass field.

In 1973, the Astros installed an all-AstroTurf infield, except for dirt patches around the bases. This "sliding pit" configuration was introduced by Cincinnati with the opening of Riverfront Stadium on June 30, 1970. It was then installed in the new stadiums in Philadelphia in 1971, and Kansas City in 1973. The artificial turf fields of Pittsburgh, St. Louis, and San Francisco, all installed in 1970, were traditionally configured like the Astrodome and later changed to sliding pits. San Francisco converted in 1971, Pittsburgh in 1973, and St. Louis in 1978. Rogers Centre in Toronto was the last park in the majors to have sliding pits; it opened in 1989 and switched to a traditional dirt skin infield in 2016.

Throughout its history, the Astrodome was known as a pitcher's park. The power alleys were never shorter than 370 feet (113 m) from the plate; on at least two occasions they were as far as 390 feet (119 m). Over time, it gave up fewer home runs than any other park in the National League. The Astrodome's reputation as a pitcher's park continued even in the mid-1980s, when the fences were moved in closer than the Metrodome, which had been long reckoned as a hitter's park.

=== Seating capacity ===
Baseball
Years	Capacity
1965	42,217
1966–1967	46,000
1968–1974	44,500
1975–1981	45,101
1982–1989	47,690
1990–1991	54,816
1992–1994	53,821
1995–1999	54,370

Football
Years	Capacity
1965–1978	50,000
1979–1981	50,153
1982–1983	50,452
1984–1986	50,495
1987–1988	50,594
1989	60,502
1990–1991	62,439
1992–1994	62,021
1995–2001	59,969

== See also ==
- List of tennis stadiums by capacity
- National Register of Historic Places listings in Harris County, Texas
- Delta Dome
- List of tallest domes

Events and tenants
Preceded by Rice Stadium	Home of the Houston Oilers; 1968–1996	Succeeded by Liberty Bowl Memorial Stadium
Preceded by Colt Stadium	Home of the Houston Astros; 1965–1999	Succeeded by Daikin Park
Preceded by Rice Stadium	Home of the Bluebonnet Bowl; 1968–1984; 1987	Succeeded by Rice Stadium
Preceded by Cole Field House	NCAA; Men's Division I Basketball Tournament; Finals Venue; 1971	Succeeded by Los Angeles Memorial Sports Arena
Preceded by Anaheim Stadium; Hubert H. Humphrey Metrodome	Host of the MLB All-Star Game; 1968; 1986	Succeeded by Robert F. Kennedy Memorial Stadium; Oakland–Alameda County Coliseum
Preceded by Chicago Stadium	Host of the NBA All-Star Game; 1989	Succeeded by Miami Arena
Preceded by Arrowhead Pond	Host of WrestleMania; 2001	Succeeded by SkyDome
