= Indiana Black Expo =

Nonprofit organization based in Indianapolis, Indiana, US

Indiana Black Expo is a nonprofit organization headquartered in Indianapolis, Indiana, U.S. It is responsible for overseeing two of the state's largest cultural events: the Indiana Black Expo Summer Celebration, and the Circle City Classic.

== History ==
The first Indiana Black Expo occurred in 1971.

Since 1983, Indiana Black Expo has hosted the Circle City Classic. The two-day event, held the first weekend in October, includes a parade as well as its main attraction, a college football game held between two historically black colleges and universities (HBCUs).
