= 1967–68 NCAA University Division men's basketball season =

Men's collegiate basketball season

- Preseason AP No. 1: UCLA Bruins
- NCAA Tournament: 1968
- Tournament dates: March 8 – 23, 1968
- National Championship: Los Angeles Memorial Sports Arena; Los Angeles, California
- NCAA Champions: UCLA Bruins
- Helms National Champions: UCLA Bruins
- Other champions: Dayton Flyers (NIT)
- Player of the Year (Helms): Lew Alcindor, UCLA Bruins

The 1967–68 NCAA University Division men's basketball season began in December 1967, progressed through the regular season and conference tournaments, and concluded with the 1968 NCAA University Division basketball tournament championship game on March 23, 1968, at Los Angeles Memorial Sports Arena in Los Angeles, California. The UCLA Bruins won their fourth NCAA national championship with a 78–55 victory over the North Carolina Tar Heels.

== Rule changes ==
The slam dunk — criticized as a move that rewards height rather than skill — is prohibited in NCAA basketball both during games and during pre-game warm-ups. It will not become legal again until the 1976–77 season.

== Season headlines ==
- Marketed as the "Game of the Century," a meeting of the Houston Cougars and the UCLA Bruins on January 20, 1968, was the first college basketball game televised nationwide in prime time in the United States. Syndicated by the TVS Television Network with Dick Enberg as play-by-play announcer and Bob Pettit providing color commentary, the broadcast established college basketball as a sports commodity on American television and paved the way for the television coverage of the NCAA tournament known today.
- UCLA won its second NCAA championship in a row, fourth overall, and fourth in five seasons. In the Athletic Association of Western Universities, it also won its second of what ultimately would be 13 consecutive conference titles.
- The National Invitation Tournament expanded from 14 to 16 teams.

== Season outlook ==
=== Pre-season polls ===
The Top 10 from the AP Poll and Top 20 from the Coaches Poll during the pre-season.

Associated Press
Ranking	Team
1	UCLA
2	Houston
3	Louisville
4	North Carolina
5	Kansas
6	Dayton
7	Boston College
8	Princeton
9	Vanderbilt
10	Davidson

UPI Coaches
Ranking	Team
1	UCLA
2	Houston
3	Kansas
4	Louisville
5	North Carolina
6	Dayton
7	Boston College
8	Princeton
9	Vanderbilt
10	Tennessee
11	Indiana
12	Davidson
13	Cincinnati
14	UTEP
15 (tie)	Loyola-Chicago
15 (tie)	St. John's
15 (tie)	Wyoming
18	Marquette
19 (tie)	Duke
19 (tie)	Niagara

== Conference membership changes ==
School	Former conference	New conference
Memphis State Tigers	NCAA University Division independent	Missouri Valley Conference
NYU Violets	Metropolitan Collegiate Conference	NCAA University Division independent
Northern Illinois Huskies	non-NCAA University Division	NCAA University Division independent
Southern Illinois Salukis	non-NCAA University Division	NCAA University Division independent

== Regular season ==
=== Conference ===
==== Conference winners and tournaments ====
Conference	Regular season winner	Conference player of the year	Conference tournament	Tournament venue (City)	Tournament winner
Athletic Association of Western Universities	UCLA	None selected	No Tournament		
Atlantic Coast Conference	North Carolina	Larry Miller, North Carolina	1968 ACC men's basketball tournament	Charlotte Coliseum (Charlotte, North Carolina)	North Carolina
Big Eight Conference	Kansas State	Donald Smith, Iowa State	No Tournament		
Big Sky Conference	Weber State	None selected	No Tournament		
Big Ten Conference	Iowa & Ohio State	None selected	No Tournament		
Ivy League	Columbia	None selected	No Tournament		
Metropolitan Collegiate Conference	St. Peter's		No Tournament		
Mid-American Conference	Bowling Green State	Fred Foster, Miami (OH)	No Tournament		
Middle Atlantic Conference	La Salle		No Tournament		
Missouri Valley Conference	Drake & Louisville	None selected	No Tournament		
Ohio Valley Conference	East Tennessee State & Murray State	Wayne Chapman, Western Kentucky, & Skeeter Swift, East Tennessee State	No Tournament		
Southeastern Conference	Kentucky	Pete Maravich, LSU	No Tournament		
Southern Conference	Davidson	Ron Williams, West Virginia	1968 Southern Conference men's basketball tournament	Charlotte Coliseum (Charlotte, North Carolina)	Davidson
Southwest Conference	TCU	Billy Arnold, Texas	No Tournament		
West Coast Athletic Conference	Santa Clara	Rick Adelman, Loyola (Calif.)	No Tournament		
Western Athletic Conference	New Mexico	None selected	No Tournament		
Yankee Conference	Massachusetts & Rhode Island	None selected	No Tournament		

==== Conference standings ====
1967–68 AAWU Conference men's basketball standings
	Conf.				Overall
Team	W		L	PCT	W		L	PCT
No. 2 UCLA	14	–	0	1.000	29	–	1	.967
USC	11	–	3	.786	18	–	8	.692
Washington State	8	–	6	.571	16	–	9	.640
California	7	–	7	.500	16	–	9	.640
Oregon State	5	–	9	.357	12	–	13	.480
Stanford	5	–	9	.357	11	–	15	.423
Washington	4	–	10	.286	12	–	14	.462
Oregon	2	–	12	.143	7	–	19	.269
Rankings from AP Poll

1967–68 ACC men's basketball standings
	Conf.				Overall
Team	W		L	PCT	W		L	PCT
No. 4 North Carolina †	12	–	2	.857	28	–	4	.875
No. 10 Duke	11	–	3	.786	22	–	6	.786
NC State	9	–	5	.643	16	–	10	.615
South Carolina	9	–	5	.643	15	–	7	.682
Virginia	5	–	9	.357	9	–	16	.360
Maryland	4	–	10	.286	8	–	16	.333
Clemson	3	–	11	.214	4	–	20	.167
Wake Forest	3	–	11	.214	5	–	21	.192
† 1968 ACC tournament winner Rankings from AP Poll

1967–68 Big Eight Conference men's basketball standings
	Conf.				Overall
Team	W		L	PCT	W		L	PCT
Kansas State	11	–	3	.786	19	–	9	.679
Kansas	10	–	4	.714	22	–	8	.733
Nebraska	8	–	6	.571	15	–	10	.600
Oklahoma	8	–	6	.571	13	–	13	.500
Iowa State	8	–	6	.571	12	–	13	.480
Missouri	5	–	9	.357	10	–	16	.385
Oklahoma State	3	–	11	.214	10	–	16	.385
Colorado	3	–	11	.214	9	–	16	.360
Rankings from AP Poll

1967–68 Big Sky men's basketball standings
	Conf.				Overall
Team	W		L	PCT	W		L	PCT
Weber State	12	–	3	.800	21	–	6	.778
Idaho	9	–	3	.750	15	–	11	.577
Idaho State	7	–	8	.467	13	–	13	.500
Montana State	6	–	9	.400	10	–	15	.400
Gonzaga	6	–	9	.400	9	–	17	.346
Montana	5	–	10	.333	8	–	17	.320

1967–68 Big Ten Conference men's basketball standings
	Conf.				Overall
Team	W		L	PCT	W		L	PCT
Ohio State	10	–	4	.714	21	–	8	.724
Iowa	10	–	4	.714	16	–	9	.640
Purdue	9	–	5	.643	15	–	9	.625
Northwestern	8	–	6	.571	13	–	10	.565
Wisconsin	7	–	7	.500	13	–	11	.542
Michigan State	6	–	8	.429	12	–	12	.500
Illinois	6	–	8	.429	11	–	13	.458
Michigan	6	–	8	.429	11	–	13	.458
Indiana	4	–	10	.286	10	–	14	.417
Minnesota	4	–	10	.286	7	–	17	.292
Rankings from AP Poll

1967–68 Ivy League men's basketball standings
	Conf.				Overall
Team	W		L	PCT	W		L	PCT
No. 7 Columbia†	12	–	2	.857	23	–	5	.821
Princeton	12	–	2	.857	20	–	6	.769
Yale	8	–	6	.571	15	–	9	.625
Cornell	6	–	8	.429	14	–	11	.560
Dartmouth	6	–	8	.429	8	–	18	.308
Brown	4	–	10	.286	9	–	16	.360
Pennsylvania	4	–	10	.286	9	–	17	.346
Harvard	4	–	10	.286	7	–	14	.333
† Regular-season championship winner Rankings from AP Poll

1967–68 Metropolitan Collegiate Conference men's basketball standings
	Conf.				Overall
Team	W		L	PCT	W		L	PCT
Saint Peter's	8	–	0	1.000	24	–	4	.857
LIU	7	–	1	.875	22	–	2	.917
Wagner	5	–	3	.625	21	–	8	.724
Iona	4	–	4	.500	13	–	9	.591
Fairleigh Dickinson	4	–	4	.500	10	–	12	.455
Seton Hall	4	–	4	.500	9	–	15	.375
Manhattan	3	–	5	.375	8	–	14	.364
Hofstra	1	–	7	.125	13	–	12	.520
St. Francis (NY)	0	–	8	.000	7	–	16	.304
Rankings from AP Poll

1967–68 Mid-American Conference men's basketball standings
	Conf.				Overall
Team	W		L	PCT	W		L	PCT
Bowling Green State	10	–	2	.833	18	–	7	.720
Marshall	9	–	3	.750	17	–	8	.680
Toledo	8	–	4	.667	16	–	8	.667
Western Michigan	5	–	7	.417	11	–	13	.458
Miami (Ohio)	4	–	8	.333	11	–	12	.478
Kent State	3	–	9	.250	9	–	15	.375
Ohio	3	–	9	.250	7	–	16	.304
Rankings from AP Poll

1967–68 MAC men's basketball standings
	Conf.				Overall
Team	W		L	PCT	W		L	PCT
La Salle†	8	–	0	1.000	20	–	8	.714
Delaware	7	–	2	.778	16	–	7	.696
American	5	–	2	.714	14	–	12	.538
Temple	5	–	3	.625	19	–	9	.679
Saint Joseph's	2	–	2	.500	17	–	9	.654
Lehigh	5	–	5	.500	12	–	11	.522
Gettysburg	5	–	6	.455	14	–	11	.560
Bucknell	4	–	6	.400	12	–	11	.522
Rider	1	–	6	.143	9	–	15	.375
Lafayette	1	–	11	.083	5	–	19	.208
† Regular-season championship winner Rankings from AP Poll

1967–68 Missouri Valley Conference men's basketball standings
	Conf.				Overall
Team	W		L	PCT	W		L	PCT
No. 9 Louisville	14	–	2	.875	21	–	7	.750
Bradley	12	–	4	.750	19	–	9	.679
Cincinnati	11	–	5	.688	18	–	8	.692
Drake	9	–	7	.563	18	–	8	.692
Saint Louis	9	–	7	.563	15	–	11	.577
Wichita State	7	–	9	.438	12	–	14	.462
Tulsa	5	–	11	.313	11	–	12	.478
North Texas State	3	–	13	.188	8	–	18	.308
Memphis State	2	–	14	.125	8	–	17	.320
Rankings from AP Poll

1967–68 Ohio Valley Conference men's basketball standings
	Conf.				Overall
Team	W		L	PCT	W		L	PCT
East Tennessee State	10	–	4	.714	19	–	8	.704
Murray State	10	–	4	.714	16	–	8	.667
Western Kentucky	9	–	5	.643	18	–	7	.720
Morehead State	8	–	6	.571	12	–	9	.571
Middle Tennessee	7	–	7	.500	15	–	9	.625
Eastern Kentucky	6	–	8	.429	10	–	14	.417
Tennessee Tech	4	–	10	.286	10	–	16	.385
Austin Peay State	2	–	12	.143	8	–	16	.333
Rankings from AP Poll

1967–68 Southeastern Conference men's basketball standings
	Conf.				Overall
Team	W		L	PCT	W		L	PCT
No. 5 Kentucky	15	–	3	.833	22	–	5	.815
Tennessee	13	–	5	.722	20	–	6	.769
Vanderbilt	12	–	6	.667	20	–	6	.769
Georgia	11	–	7	.611	17	–	8	.680
Florida	11	–	7	.611	15	–	10	.600
LSU	8	–	10	.444	14	–	12	.538
Auburn	8	–	10	.444	13	–	13	.500
Mississippi State	5	–	13	.278	9	–	17	.346
Ole Miss	4	–	14	.222	7	–	17	.292
Alabama	3	–	15	.167	10	–	16	.385
Rankings from AP Poll

1967–68 Southern Conference men's basketball standings
	Conf.				Overall
Team	W		L	PCT	W		L	PCT
No. 8 Davidson †	9	–	1	.900	24	–	5	.828
West Virginia	9	–	2	.818	19	–	9	.679
The Citadel	6	–	5	.545	11	–	14	.440
VMI	8	–	7	.533	9	–	12	.429
Furman	6	–	6	.500	13	–	14	.481
Richmond	8	–	8	.500	12	–	13	.480
East Carolina	6	–	7	.462	9	–	16	.360
William & Mary	4	–	10	.286	6	–	18	.250
George Washington	2	–	12	.143	5	–	19	.208
† 1968 Southern Conference tournament winner Rankings from AP Poll

1967–68 Southwest Conference men's basketball standings
	Conf.				Overall
Team	W		L	PCT	W		L	PCT
TCU	9	–	5	.643	15	–	11	.577
Baylor	8	–	6	.571	15	–	9	.625
Texas A&M	8	–	6	.571	14	–	10	.583
Texas	8	–	6	.571	11	–	13	.458
Arkansas	7	–	7	.500	10	–	14	.417
Rice	6	–	8	.429	8	–	16	.333
Texas Tech	5	–	9	.357	9	–	15	.375
SMU	5	–	9	.357	6	–	18	.250
Rankings from AP Poll

1967–68 West Coast Athletic Conference men's basketball standings
	Conf.				Overall
Team	W		L	PCT	W		L	PCT
Santa Clara	11	–	1	.917	22	–	4	.846
Loyola (Calif.)	10	–	2	.833	19	–	6	.760
San Francisco	8	–	4	.667	16	–	10	.615
San Jose State		–		–	13	–	12	.520
Pacific	5	–	7	.417	17	–	9	.654
UC Santa Barbara	3	–	9	.250	9	–	17	.346
Saint Mary's	3	–	9	.250	4	–	20	.167
Pepperdine	2	–	10	.167	9	–	17	.346
Rankings from AP poll

1967–68 WAC men's basketball standings
	Conf.				Overall
Team	W		L	PCT	W		L	PCT
No. 6 New Mexico	8	–	2	.800	23	–	5	.821
Wyoming	5	–	5	.500	18	–	9	.667
Utah	5	–	5	.500	17	–	9	.654
BYU	4	–	6	.400	13	–	12	.520
Arizona	4	–	6	.400	11	–	13	.458
Arizona State	4	–	6	.400	11	–	17	.393
Rankings from AP Poll

1967–68 Yankee Conference men's basketball standings
	Conf.				Overall
Team	W		L	PCT	W		L	PCT
Rhode Island	8	–	2	.800	15	–	11	.577
Massachusetts	8	–	2	.800	14	–	11	.560
Connecticut	7	–	3	.700	11	–	13	.458
Vermont	5	–	5	.500	12	–	12	.500
Maine	2	–	8	.200	7	–	17	.292
New Hampshire	0	–	10	.000	1	–	22	.043

=== University Division independents ===
A total of 53 college teams played as University Division independents. Among them, Houston (31–2) had both the best winning percentage (.939) and the most wins.

1967–68 NCAA University Division men's basketball independents standings
	Conf.				Overall
Team	W		L	PCT	W		L	PCT
No. 1 Houston		–		–	31	–	2	.939
No. 3 St. Bonaventure		–		–	23	–	2	.920
Army		–		–	20	–	5	.800
Marquette		–		–	23	–	6	.793
New Mexico State		–		–	23	–	6	.793
St. Francis (PA)		–		–	19	–	6	.760
Oklahoma City		–		–	20	–	7	.741
Duquesne		–		–	18	–	7	.720
Florida State		–		–	19	–	8	.704
Fordham		–		–	19	–	8	.704
St. John's		–		–	19	–	8	.704
Dayton		–		–	21	–	9	.700
Notre Dame		–		–	21	–	9	.700
Boston College		–		–	17	–	8	.680
Villanova		–		–	19	–	9	.679
Holy Cross		–		–	15	–	8	.652
Loyola Chicago		–		–	15	–	9	.625
Fairfield		–		–	16	–	10	.615
Texas Western		–		–	14	–	9	.609
Miami (FL)		–		–	17	–	11	.607
Rutgers		–		–	14	–	10	.583
Utah State		–		–	14	–	11	.560
VPI		–		–	14	–	11	.560
Southern Illinois		–		–	13	–	11	.542
DePaul		–		–	13	–	12	.520
Detroit		–		–	13	–	12	.520
Seattle		–		–	14	–	13	.519
Jacksonville		–		–	13	–	13	.500
Niagara		–		–	12	–	12	.500
Tulane		–		–	12	–	12	.500
Penn State		–		–	10	–	10	.500
Georgia Tech		–		–	12	–	13	.480
Georgetown		–		–	11	–	12	.478
West Texas State		–		–	10	–	11	.476
Colorado State		–		–	11	–	13	.458
Navy		–		–	9	–	11	.450
Butler		–		–	11	–	14	.440
Denver		–		–	11	–	14	.440
Loyola (LA)		–		–	11	–	14	.440
Providence		–		–	11	–	14	.440
Syracuse		–		–	11	–	14	.440
Boston University		–		–	10	–	14	.417
Northern Illinois		–		–	10	–	14	.417
Colgate		–		–	10	–	16	.385
Hardin–Simmons		–		–	10	–	16	.385
Xavier		–		–	10	–	16	.385
Air Force		–		–	9	–	15	.375
NYU		–		–	8	–	16	.333
Creighton		–		–	8	–	17	.320
Pittsburgh		–		–	7	–	15	.318
Canisius		–		–	7	–	17	.292
Portland		–		–	5	–	21	.192
Centenary		–		–	3	–	23	.115
Rankings from AP Poll

=== Informal championships ===
Conference	Regular season winner	Most Valuable Player
Philadelphia Big 5	Saint Joseph's	Johnny Jones, Villanova

Saint Joseph's finished with a 3–1 record in head-to-head competition among the Philadelphia Big 5.

== Post-season tournaments ==
=== NCAA tournament ===
==== Final Four ====
National semifinals
E	North Carolina	80
ME	Ohio State	66
MW	Houston	69
W	UCLA	101

National finals
E	North Carolina	55
W	UCLA	78
Third place
ME	Ohio State	89
MW	Houston	85

=== National Invitation tournament ===
==== Semifinals & finals ====
Semifinals
Kansas	58
St. Peter's	46
Dayton	76
Notre Dame	74

Finals
Kansas	48
Dayton	61
Third place
St. Peter's	78
Notre Dame	81

== Awards ==
=== Consensus All-American teams ===
Consensus First Team
Player	Position	Class	Team
Lew Alcindor	C	Junior	UCLA
Elvin Hayes	F/C	Senior	Houston
Pete Maravich	G/F	Sophomore	Louisiana State
Larry Miller	F	Senior	North Carolina
Wes Unseld	C	Senior	Louisville

Consensus Second Team
Player	Position	Class	Team
Lucius Allen	G	Junior	UCLA
Bob Lanier	C	Sophomore	St. Bonaventure
Don May	G/F	Senior	Dayton
Calvin Murphy	G	Sophomore	Niagara
Jo Jo White	G	Junior	Kansas

=== Major player of the year awards ===
- Helms Player of the Year: Lew Alcindor, UCLA
- Associated Press Player of the Year: Elvin Hayes, Houston
- UPI Player of the Year: Elvin Hayes, Houston
- Oscar Robertson Trophy (USBWA): Lew Alcindor, UCLA
- Sporting News Player of the Year: Elvin Hayes, Houston

=== Major coach of the year awards ===
- Associated Press Coach of the Year: Guy Lewis, Houston
- Henry Iba Award (USBWA): Guy Lewis, Houston
- NABC Coach of the Year: Guy Lewis, Houston
- UPI Coach of the Year: Guy Lewis, Houston
- Sporting News Coach of the Year: Guy Lewis, Houston

=== Other major awards ===
- Robert V. Geasey Trophy (Top player in Philadelphia Big 5): Johnny Jones, Villanova
- NIT/Haggerty Award (Top player in New York City metro area): Jim McMillian, Columbia

== Coaching changes ==
A number of teams changed coaches throughout the season and after the season ended.

Team	Former Coach	Interim Coach	New Coach	Reason
Alabama	Hayden Riley		C. M. Newton	
Bowling Green State	Bill Fitch		Bob Conibear	
California	Rene Herrerias		Jim Padgett	
Cornell	Sam MacNeil		Jerry Lace	
Denver	Troy Bledsoe		Stan Albeck	
Fairfield	George Bisacca		Jim Lynam	
Fordham	Johnny Bach		Ed Conlin	Bach left to coach Penn State.
Harvard	Floyd Wilson		Bob Harrison	
Kansas State	Tex Winter		Cotton Fitzsimmons	Winter left to coach Washington.
La Salle	Jim Harding		Tom Gola	
Loyola (Calif.)	John Arndt		Richard Baker	
Loyola (LA)	Ron Greene		Bob Luksta	
Maine	Brian McCall		Gil Philbrick	
Manhattan	Ken Norton		John Powers	
Michigan	Dave Strack		Johnny Orr	
Minnesota	John Kundla		Bill Fitch	
Montana	Ron Nord		Bob Cope	
Niagara	James Maloney		Frank Layden	
Ole Miss	Eddie Crawford		Cob Jarvis	
Pepperdine	Duck Dowell		Gary Golson	
Penn State	John Egli		Johnny Bach	
Pittsburgh	Bob Timmons		Charles Ridl	
Rhode Island	Ernie Calverley		Tom Carmody	
Syracuse	Fred Lewis		Roy Danforth	
Tennessee State	Harold Hunter		Edward Martin	
Tulsa	Joe Swank		Ken Hayes	Hayes was an assistant coach under Swank.
Washington	Mac Duckworth		Tex Winter	
Weber State	Dick Motta		Phil Johnson	
