= Larry Weise =

American basketball coach and athletic director

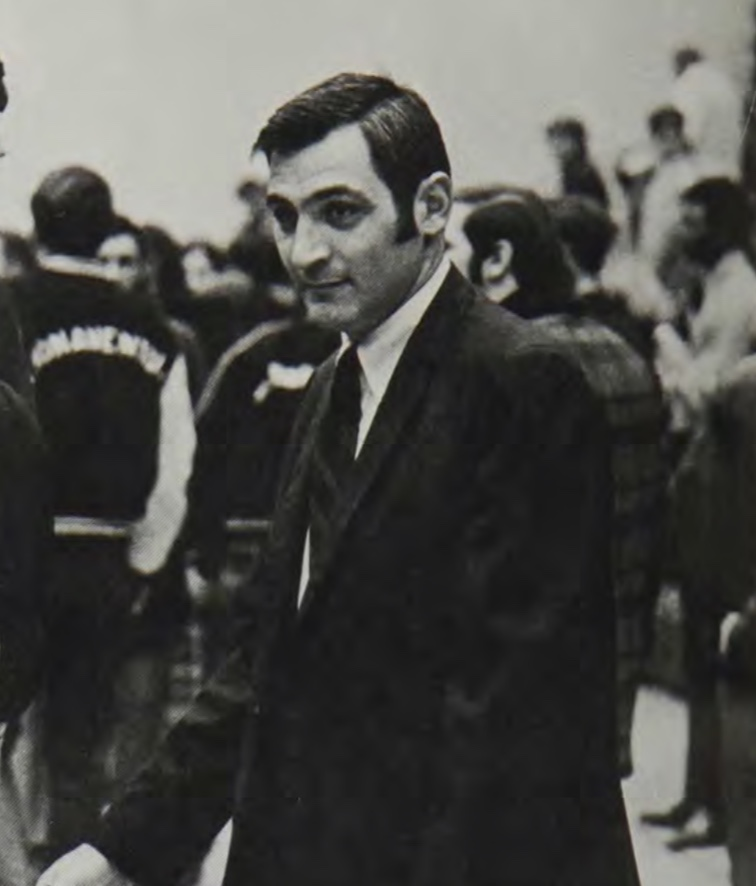
- Weise during the 1969–70 season

Playing career
- 1955–1958: St. Bonaventure

Coaching career (HC unless noted)
- 1961–1973: St. Bonaventure

Administrative career (AD unless noted)
- 1965–1992: St. Bonaventure

Head coaching record
- Overall: 202–90 (.692)
- Tournaments: 4–4 (NCAA); 3–2 (NIT)

Accomplishments and honors

Championships
- NCAA regional—Final Four (1970)

Larry Weise is an American former basketball coach and athletic director. Weise was the head basketball coach at St. Bonaventure University from 1961 to 1973, compiling an overall record of 202–90, and leading the Brown Indians to an NCAA final Four appearance in 1970. He also served as athletic director for St. Bonaventure from 1965 to 1992. Weise was elected to the Greater Buffalo Sports Hall of Fame in 2002.

== Head coaching record ==
Record table
Season	Team	Overall	Conference	Standing	Postseason
St. Bonaventure Brown Indians (NCAA University Division Independent) (1961–1973)
1961–62	St. Bonaventure	14–7			
1962–63	St. Bonaventure	13–12			
1963–64	St. Bonaventure	16–8			NIT First Round
1964–65	St. Bonaventure	15–8			
1965–66	St. Bonaventure	16–7			
1966–67	St. Bonaventure	13–9			
1967–68	St. Bonaventure	23–2			NCAA University Division Regional Semifinals
1968–69	St. Bonaventure	17–7			
1969–70	St. Bonaventure	25–3			NCAA University Division Fourth Place
1970–71	St. Bonaventure	21–6			NIT Third Place
1971–72	St. Bonaventure	16–8			
1972–73	St. Bonaventure	13–13			
St. Bonaventure:		202–90 (.692)			
Total:		202–90 (.692)			

== See also ==
- List of NCAA Division I Men's Final Four appearances by coach
