= 1967–68 St. Bonaventure Brown Indians men's basketball team =

American college basketball season

1967–68 St. Bonaventure Brown Indians men's basketball
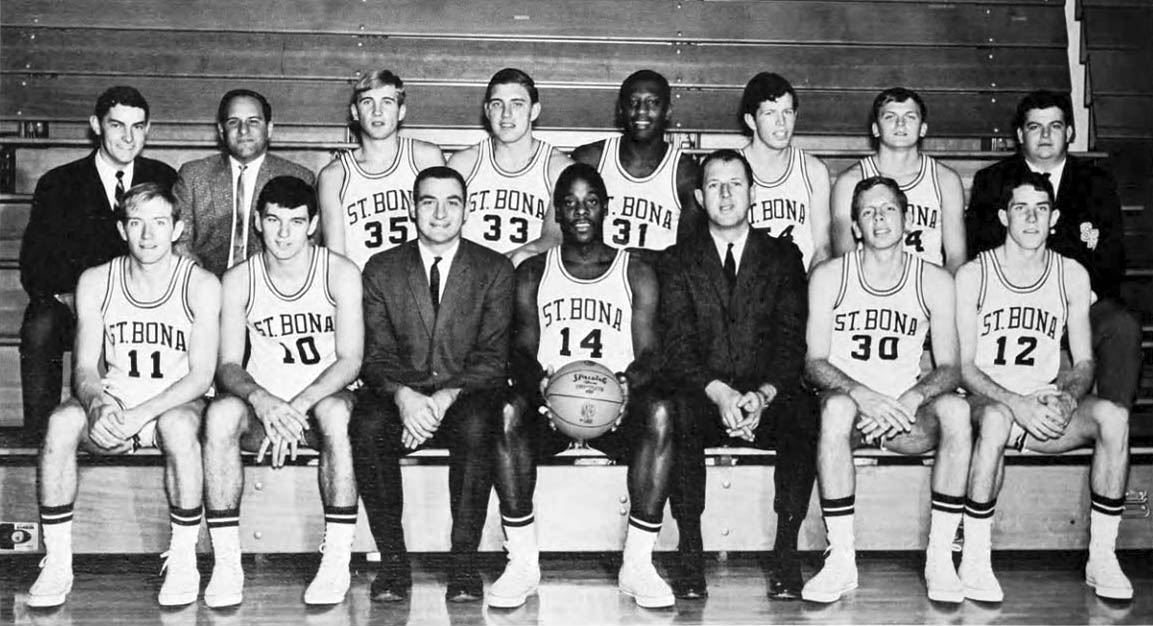

NCAA tournament, Sweet Sixteen
- Conference: Independent

Ranking
- Coaches: No. 3
- AP: No. 3
- Record: 23–2
- Head coach: Larry Weise (7th season)
- Assistant coaches: Bob Sassone; Fred Handler
- Home arena: Reilly Center

1967–68 NCAA University Division men's basketball independents standings
	Conf.				Overall
Team	W		L	PCT	W		L	PCT
No. 1 Houston		–		–	31	–	2	.939
No. 3 St. Bonaventure		–		–	23	–	2	.920
Army		–		–	20	–	5	.800
Marquette		–		–	23	–	6	.793
New Mexico State		–		–	23	–	6	.793
St. Francis (PA)		–		–	19	–	6	.760
Oklahoma City		–		–	20	–	7	.741
Duquesne		–		–	18	–	7	.720
Florida State		–		–	19	–	8	.704
Fordham		–		–	19	–	8	.704
St. John's		–		–	19	–	8	.704
Dayton		–		–	21	–	9	.700
Notre Dame		–		–	21	–	9	.700
Boston College		–		–	17	–	8	.680
Villanova		–		–	19	–	9	.679
Holy Cross		–		–	15	–	8	.652
Loyola Chicago		–		–	15	–	9	.625
Fairfield		–		–	16	–	10	.615
Texas Western		–		–	14	–	9	.609
Miami (FL)		–		–	17	–	11	.607
Rutgers		–		–	14	–	10	.583
Utah State		–		–	14	–	11	.560
VPI		–		–	14	–	11	.560
Southern Illinois		–		–	13	–	11	.542
DePaul		–		–	13	–	12	.520
Detroit		–		–	13	–	12	.520
Seattle		–		–	14	–	13	.519
Jacksonville		–		–	13	–	13	.500
Niagara		–		–	12	–	12	.500
Tulane		–		–	12	–	12	.500
Penn State		–		–	10	–	10	.500
Georgia Tech		–		–	12	–	13	.480
Georgetown		–		–	11	–	12	.478
West Texas State		–		–	10	–	11	.476
Colorado State		–		–	11	–	13	.458
Navy		–		–	9	–	11	.450
Butler		–		–	11	–	14	.440
Denver		–		–	11	–	14	.440
Loyola (LA)		–		–	11	–	14	.440
Providence		–		–	11	–	14	.440
Syracuse		–		–	11	–	14	.440
Boston University		–		–	10	–	14	.417
Northern Illinois		–		–	10	–	14	.417
Colgate		–		–	10	–	16	.385
Hardin–Simmons		–		–	10	–	16	.385
Xavier		–		–	10	–	16	.385
Air Force		–		–	9	–	15	.375
NYU		–		–	8	–	16	.333
Creighton		–		–	8	–	17	.320
Pittsburgh		–		–	7	–	15	.318
Canisius		–		–	7	–	17	.292
Portland		–		–	5	–	21	.192
Centenary		–		–	3	–	23	.115
Rankings from AP Poll

The 1967–68 St. Bonaventure Brown Indians men's basketball team represented St. Bonaventure University during the 1967–68 NCAA University Division men's basketball season. The Brown Indians were independent and not a member of a conference. They were led by seventh year head coach Larry Weise as well as 6′ 11″ center Bob Lanier, named a consensus second-team All-American as a sophomore. St. Bonaventure advanced to the NCAA tournament, and finished with a 23–2 record and No. 3 in the final rankings of both major polls.

== Roster ==
1967–68 St. Bonaventure Brown Indians men's basketball team
Players
Coaches

Pos.	#	Name	Height	Weight	Year	Hometown
G	11	Bill Kalbaugh	5 ft 11 in (1.8 m)	—	So
F	14	Bill Butler	6 ft 3 in (1.91 m)	—	Sr	Washington, D.C.
C	31	Bob Lanier	6 ft 11 in (2.11 m)	265 lb (120 kg)	So	Buffalo, New York
G	12	Gene Fahey	6 ft 1 in (1.85 m)	—	So

Head coach

- Larry Weise (St. Bonaventure)

Assistant coach(es)

Legend

- (C) Team captain
- (S) Suspended
- (I) Ineligible
- (W) Walk-on
- Injured
- Current redshirt

== Schedule and results ==
Date time, TV	Rank^{#}	Opponent^{#}	Result	Record	Site (attendance) city, state
Regular season
*		Quincy	W 103–55	1–0	Reilly Center; Buffalo, New York
*		Gannon	W 105–85	2–0	Reilly Center; Buffalo, New York
Dec 9, 1967*		at Toledo	W 94–93 ^{OT}	3–0	The Field House; Toledo, Ohio
Dec 11, 1967*		Xavier	W 93–69	4–0	Reilly Center; Buffalo, New York
Dec 16, 1967*		Duquesne	W 96–74	5–0	Reilly Center; Buffalo, New York
Dec 18, 1967*		vs. Auburn; Tampa Invitational	W 77–73	6–0	Hixon Hall; Tampa, Florida
Dec 19, 1967*		vs. Seattle; Tampa Invitational	W 83–77	7–0	Hixon Hall; Tampa, Florida
Dec ?, 1967*		Loyola (MD)	W 94–78	8–0	Reilly Center; Buffalo, New York
Dec ?, 1967*		Baldwin Wallace	W 81–69	9–0	Reilly Center; Buffalo, New York
Jan 3, 1968*	No. 9	at Kent State	W 80–63	10–0	Memorial Athletic and Convocation Center; Kent, Ohio
Jan 6, 1968*	No. 9	Niagara	W 101–72	11–0	Reilly Center; Buffalo, New York
Jan 10, 1968*	No. 7	DePaul	W 77–67	12–0	Reilly Center; Buffalo, New York
Jan 20, 1968*	No. 7	at Canisius	W 71–65	13–0	Buffalo Memorial Auditorium; Buffalo, New York
Jan 23, 1968*	No. 5	Detroit	W 103–74	14–0	Reilly Center; Buffalo, New York
Jan 25, 1968*	No. 5	Saint Francis (PA)	W 74–58	15–0	Reilly Center; Buffalo, New York
Jan 31, 1968*	No. 5	at Villanova	W 66–62	16–0	Villanova Field House; Philadelphia, Pennsylvania
Feb 10, 1968*	No. 4	Providence	W 70–56	17–0	Reilly Center; Buffalo, New York
Feb 14, 1968*	No. 4	at Seton Hall	W 81–71	18–0	Walsh Gymnasium; East Rutherford, New Jersey
Feb 19, 1968*	No. 4	Creighton	W 97–84	19–0	Reilly Center; Buffalo, New York
Feb 25, 1968*	No. 4	at Niagara	W 97–84	20–0	Buffalo Memorial Auditorium; Buffalo, New York
Feb 28, 1968*	No. 4	Canisius	W 79–62	21–0	Reilly Center; Buffalo, New York
Mar 5, 1968*	No. 3	at Fairfield	W 70–69 ^{OT}	22–0	Alumni Hall; Fairfield, Connecticut
NCAA tournament
Mar 9, 1968*	No. 3	vs. Boston College; First round	W 102–93	23–0	Keaney Gymnasium; Kingston, Rhode Island
Mar 15, 1968*	No. 3	vs. No. 4 North Carolina; East Regional Semifinal – Sweet Sixteen	L 72–91	23–1	Reynolds Coliseum; Raleigh, North Carolina
Mar 17, 1968*	No. 3	vs. No. 7 Columbia; East Regional Consolation Game	L 75–95	23–2	Reynolds Coliseum; Raleigh, North Carolina
*Non-conference game. ^{#}Rankings from AP Poll. (#) Tournament seedings in parentheses. E=East. All times are in Eastern Time.

== Awards and honors ==
- Bob Lanier – Consensus Second-Team All-American
