= 1968 National Invitation Tournament =

US college basketball tournament

- Season: 1967–68
- Teams: 16
- Finals site: Madison Square Garden, New York City
- Champions: Dayton Flyers (2nd title)
- Runner-up: Kansas Jayhawks (1st title game)
- Semifinalists: Notre Dame Fighting Irish (1st semifinal); Saint Peter's Peacocks (1st semifinal)
- Winning coach: Don Donoher (1st title)
- MVP: Don May (Dayton)

The National Invitation Tournament was originated by the Metropolitan Basketball Writers Association in 1938. Responsibility for its administration was transferred two years later to local colleges, first known as the Metropolitan Intercollegiate Basketball Committee and in 1948, as the Metropolitan Intercollegiate Basketball Association (MIBA), which comprised representatives from five New York City schools: Fordham University, Manhattan College, New York University, St. John's University, and Wagner College. Originally all of the teams qualifying for the tournament were invited to New York City, and all games were played at Madison Square Garden.

The tournament originally consisted of only six teams, which later expanded to eight teams in 1941, 12 teams in 1949, 14 teams in 1965, 16 teams in 1968, 24 teams in 1979, 32 teams in 1980, and 40 teams from 2002 through 2006. In 2007, the tournament reverted to the current 32-team format.

Perennial power Kansas made its first NIT appearance, losing in the final to Dayton. The Jayhawks returned to the NIT the next season for the last time.

== Selected teams ==
Below is a list of the 16 teams selected for the tournament.

Team	Conference	Overall record	Appearance	Last bid
Army	Independent	20–4	5th	1966
Bradley	Missouri Valley	19–8	13th	1965
Dayton	Independent	17–9	11th	1962
Duke	ACC	21–5	2nd	1967
Duquesne	Independent	18–6	12th	1964
Fordham	Independent	18–7	6th	1965
Kansas	Big Eight	19–7	1st	Never
Long Island	Metro Collegiate	21–1	8th	1950
Marshall	MAC	17–7	2nd	1967
Notre Dame	Independent	18–8	1st	Never
Oklahoma City	Independent	20–6	2nd	1959
Saint Peter's	Metro Collegiate	22–2	4th	1967
Temple	Middle Atlantic	19–8	7th	1966
Villanova	Independent	18–8	7th	1967
West Virginia	SoCon	19–8	5th	1947
Wyoming	WAC	18–8	1st	Never

== Bracket ==
Below is the tournament bracket.

First Round
Villanova	77
Wyoming	66
Kansas	82
Temple	76
Saint Peter's	102
Marshall	93
Duke	97
Oklahoma City	81
Dayton	87
West Virginia	68
Fordham	69
Duquesne	60
Notre Dame	62
Army	58
Long Island	80
Bradley	77

Quarterfinals
Villanova	49
Kansas	55
Saint Peter's	100
Duke	71
Dayton	61
Fordham	60
Notre Dame	62
Long Island	60

Semifinals
Kansas	58
Saint Peter's	46
Dayton	76
Notre Dame	74

Finals
Kansas	48
Dayton	61

Third place game
Saint Peter's	78
Notre Dame	81

== See also ==
- 1968 NCAA University Division basketball tournament
- 1968 NCAA College Division basketball tournament
- 1968 NAIA Division I men's basketball tournament
