= 1967–68 Georgetown Hoyas men's basketball team =

American college basketball season

1967–68 Georgetown Hoyas men's basketball
- Conference: Independent
- Record: 11–12
- Head coach: John Magee (2nd season)
- Assistant coach: Bob Reese (2nd season)
- Captains: Dennis Cesar; Bruce Stinebrickner
- Home arena: McDonough Gymnasium

1967–68 NCAA University Division men's basketball independents standings
	Conf.				Overall
Team	W		L	PCT	W		L	PCT
No. 1 Houston		–		–	31	–	2	.939
No. 3 St. Bonaventure		–		–	23	–	2	.920
Army		–		–	20	–	5	.800
Marquette		–		–	23	–	6	.793
New Mexico State		–		–	23	–	6	.793
St. Francis (PA)		–		–	19	–	6	.760
Oklahoma City		–		–	20	–	7	.741
Duquesne		–		–	18	–	7	.720
Florida State		–		–	19	–	8	.704
Fordham		–		–	19	–	8	.704
St. John's		–		–	19	–	8	.704
Dayton		–		–	21	–	9	.700
Notre Dame		–		–	21	–	9	.700
Boston College		–		–	17	–	8	.680
Villanova		–		–	19	–	9	.679
Holy Cross		–		–	15	–	8	.652
Loyola Chicago		–		–	15	–	9	.625
Fairfield		–		–	16	–	10	.615
Texas Western		–		–	14	–	9	.609
Miami (FL)		–		–	17	–	11	.607
Rutgers		–		–	14	–	10	.583
Utah State		–		–	14	–	11	.560
VPI		–		–	14	–	11	.560
Southern Illinois		–		–	13	–	11	.542
DePaul		–		–	13	–	12	.520
Detroit		–		–	13	–	12	.520
Seattle		–		–	14	–	13	.519
Jacksonville		–		–	13	–	13	.500
Niagara		–		–	12	–	12	.500
Tulane		–		–	12	–	12	.500
Penn State		–		–	10	–	10	.500
Georgia Tech		–		–	12	–	13	.480
Georgetown		–		–	11	–	12	.478
West Texas State		–		–	10	–	11	.476
Colorado State		–		–	11	–	13	.458
Navy		–		–	9	–	11	.450
Butler		–		–	11	–	14	.440
Denver		–		–	11	–	14	.440
Loyola (LA)		–		–	11	–	14	.440
Providence		–		–	11	–	14	.440
Syracuse		–		–	11	–	14	.440
Boston University		–		–	10	–	14	.417
Northern Illinois		–		–	10	–	14	.417
Colgate		–		–	10	–	16	.385
Hardin–Simmons		–		–	10	–	16	.385
Xavier		–		–	10	–	16	.385
Air Force		–		–	9	–	15	.375
NYU		–		–	8	–	16	.333
Creighton		–		–	8	–	17	.320
Pittsburgh		–		–	7	–	15	.318
Canisius		–		–	7	–	17	.292
Portland		–		–	5	–	21	.192
Centenary		–		–	3	–	23	.115
Rankings from AP Poll

The 1967–68 Georgetown Hoyas men's basketball team represented Georgetown University during the 1967–68 NCAA University Division college basketball season. John Magee coached them in his second season as head coach. The team was an independent and played its home games at McDonough Gymnasium on the Georgetown campus in Washington, D.C. It finished with a record of 11–12 and had no post-season play.

== Season recap ==
The 1967–68 season saw the beginning of an annual series between Georgetown and Holy Cross. It continued through the 1979–80 season, after which the rivalry between the schools came to an end.

Only five lettermen returned from the previous season's 12–11 team, none of them taller than 6 feet 4 inches (193 cm) tall. After a strong season on the freshman team, sophomore center Charlie Adrion joined them on the varsity this season. In mid-December 1968, Magee moved sophomore forward Paul Favorite to center and moved Adrion to forward. The switch was successful; at forward, Adrion excelled on both offense and defense. In the third game of the season, at Syracuse, he led the Hoyas in scoring for the first time with 18 points. He followed this up with 21 points and 19 rebounds against Loyola, 15 points and 13 rebounds against Rutgers, 18 points and 17 rebounds three days later against Xavier, and, in arguably the best performance by a Georgetown player in a single game, 30 points and 29 rebounds on February 22, 1968, against George Washington. He scored 20 or more points in six of the last eight games of the year and finished the season averaging 17 points and 10 rebounds a game.

Eight games into the season, senior guard and team co-captain Bruce Stinebrickner was shooting 63% from the field – among the top ten in the National Collegiate Athletic Association (NCAA) – and he averaged 12.4 points and 6.2 rebounds per game this year. He scored in double figures in 16 games, twice scored a career-high 23 points, and against New York University (NYU) had 16 points and 13 rebounds, a rebounding effort matched by only two other Georgetown guards. He finished the year shooting 51.7% from the field for his career – still the second highest for a Hoya guard – never having shot under 50% for a season.

Like Adrion and Stinebrickner, senior guard and team co-captain Dennis Cesar, known for his free-throw-shooting prowess, got off to a hot start this season, leading the team in scoring in six of the first 10 games. His 25-point performance on December 6, 1967, against St. Joseph's at the Palestra in Philadelphia, Pennsylvania, in the second game of the season, including shooting 9-for-9 from the free-throw line, led Georgetown to its first victory over the Hawks since 1956. The long-awaited win prompted about 250 Georgetown students to meet the team's bus for an impromptu celebration when it arrived at McDonough Gymnasium at 2:45 a.m. after the drive back to campus.

Junior forward Jim Supple scored in double figures in 16 games, including the last seven games of the season. Among the latter were 20-plus-point performances against NYU and Fairleigh Dickinson.

The 1967–68 Hoyas were the first Georgetown team to play at the new Madison Square Garden, meeting Manhattan there on February 15, 1968, four days after the new arena opened.

The team played inconsistently all season, finishing with a record of 11–12, the first losing record by a Georgetown men's basketball team since the 1959–60 season. It had no post-season play and was not ranked in the Top 20 in the Associated Press Poll or Coaches' Poll at any time.

== Roster ==
From the 1958–59 season through this season, Georgetown players wore even-numbered jerseys for home games and odd-numbered ones for away games; for example, a player would wear No. 10 at home and No. 11 on the road. Players are listed below by the even numbers they wore at home. (The following season, this practice was discontinued, and players wore the same number at home and on the road.)

#	Name	Height	Weight (lbs.)	Position	Class	Hometown	Previous Team(s)
10	Jerry Pyles	N/A	N/A	G	So.	Oxon Hill, MD, U.S.	Oxon Hill HS
12	Bruce Stinebrickner	6'1"	180	G	Sr.	West Hempstead, NY, U.S.	St. Agnes Boys HS
14	Dennis Cesar	6'1"	180	G	So.	Clifton, NJ, U.S.	Clifton HS
20	Jim Higgins	6'1"	N/A	G	So.	Dumont, NJ, U.S.	Don Bosco Preparatory HS
24	Paul Favorite	6'8"	N/A	F	So.	Moorestown, NJ, U.S.	Saint Joseph's Preparatory School
30	Bernard White	6'1"	N/A	G	Jr.	Ann Arbor, MI, U.S.	George Mason University
34	Mike Laska	5'11"	N/A	G	So.	Worcester, MA, U.S.	Assumption Preparatory School
40	Rick Cannon	6'4"	N/A	F	Sr.	Elwood, IN, U.S.	Wendell Willkie HS
50	Bill Stewart	N/A	N/A	C	Sr.	Villanova, PA, U.S.	Saint Joseph's Preparatory School
52	Jim Supple	6'4"	185	F	Jr.	Summit, NJ, U.S.	St. Peter's Preparatory School
54	Charlie Adrian	6'8"	225	C	So.	Hillsdale, NJ, U.S.	Don Bosco Preparatory HS

== 1967–68 schedule and results ==
Date time, TV	Rank^{#}	Opponent^{#}	Result	Record	Site city, state
Regular Season
Sat., Dec. 2, 1967 no, no		American	L 67–80	0-1	McDonough Gymnasium; Washington, DC
Wed., Dec. 6, 1967 no, no		at St. Joseph's	W 86–74	1-1	Palestra; Philadelphia, PA
Tue., Dec. 12, 1967 no, no		Syracuse; Rivalry	L 78–95	1-2	McDonough Gymnasium; Washington, DC
Sat., Dec. 16, 1967 no, no		at Saint Peter's	L 78–82	1-3	Jersey City Armory; Jersey City, NJ
Mon., Dec. 18, 1967 no, no		Columbia	W 65–63 ^{2OT}	2-3	McDonough Gymnasium; Washington, DC
Thu., Dec. 21, 1967 no, no		Fairfield	W 78–61	3-3	McDonough Gymnasium; Washington, DC
Fri., Dec. 22, 1967 no, no		Holy Cross	W 93–59	4-3	McDonough Gymnasium; Washington, DC
Wed., Jan. 3, 1968 no, no		Loyola Maryland	W 69–53	5-3	McDonough Gymnasium; Washington, DC
Fri., Jan. 5, 1968 no, no		Army	L 59–60	5-4	McDonough Gymnasium; Washington, DC
Sun., Jan. 7, 1968 no, no		Catholic	W 78–76 ^{OT}	6-4	McDonough Gymnasium; Washington, DC
Wed., Jan. 10, 1968 no, no		St. John's	L 61–65	6-5	McDonough Gymnasium; Washington, DC
Sat., Jan. 13, 1968 no, no		at Seton Hall	L 57–77	6-6	Walsh Gymnasium; South Orange, NJ
Sat., Jan. 27, 1968 no, no		at Fordham	L 67–84	6-7	Rose Hill Gymnasium; Bronx, NY
Thu., Feb. 1, 1968 no, no		Rutgers	W 80–62	7-7	McDonough Gymnasium; Washington, DC
Sun., Feb. 4, 1968 no, no		at Xavier	L 68–87	7-8	Schmidt Field House; Cincinnati, OH
Wed., Feb. 7, 1968 no, no		at Navy	L 85–89 ^{OT}	7-9	Halsey Field House; Annapolis, MD
Sat., Feb. 10, 1968 no, no		George Washington	W 76–49	8-9	McDonough Gymnasium; Washington, DC
Thu., Feb. 15, 1968 no, no		at Manhattan	W 78–77	9-9	Madison Square Garden; New York, NY
Sat., Feb. 17, 1968 no, no		at Boston College	L 79–103	9-10	Roberts Center; Chestnut Hill, MA
Thu., Feb. 22, 1968 no, no		at George Washington	L 61–65	9-11	Fort Myer Gymnasium; Fort Myer, VA
Sat., Feb. 24, 1968 no, no		New York University	W 81–69	10-11	McDonough Gymnasium; Washington, DC
Mon., Feb. 26, 1968 no, no		Fairleigh Dickinson	W 104–74	11-11	McDonough Gymnasium; Washington, DC
Sat., Mar. 2, 1968 no, no		at Maryland	L 60–68	11-12	Cole Field House; College Park, MD
*Non-conference game. ^{#}Rankings from AP Poll. (#) Tournament seedings in parentheses.
