= 1967–68 Marquette Warriors men's basketball team =

American college basketball season

1967–68 Marquette Warriors men's basketball

NCAA tournament, Sweet Sixteen
- Conference: Independent
- Record: 23–6
- Head coach: Al McGuire (4th season)
- Home arena: Milwaukee Arena

1967–68 NCAA University Division men's basketball independents standings
	Conf.				Overall
Team	W		L	PCT	W		L	PCT
No. 1 Houston		–		–	31	–	2	.939
No. 3 St. Bonaventure		–		–	23	–	2	.920
Army		–		–	20	–	5	.800
Marquette		–		–	23	–	6	.793
New Mexico State		–		–	23	–	6	.793
St. Francis (PA)		–		–	19	–	6	.760
Oklahoma City		–		–	20	–	7	.741
Duquesne		–		–	18	–	7	.720
Florida State		–		–	19	–	8	.704
Fordham		–		–	19	–	8	.704
St. John's		–		–	19	–	8	.704
Dayton		–		–	21	–	9	.700
Notre Dame		–		–	21	–	9	.700
Boston College		–		–	17	–	8	.680
Villanova		–		–	19	–	9	.679
Holy Cross		–		–	15	–	8	.652
Loyola Chicago		–		–	15	–	9	.625
Fairfield		–		–	16	–	10	.615
Texas Western		–		–	14	–	9	.609
Miami (FL)		–		–	17	–	11	.607
Rutgers		–		–	14	–	10	.583
Utah State		–		–	14	–	11	.560
VPI		–		–	14	–	11	.560
Southern Illinois		–		–	13	–	11	.542
DePaul		–		–	13	–	12	.520
Detroit		–		–	13	–	12	.520
Seattle		–		–	14	–	13	.519
Jacksonville		–		–	13	–	13	.500
Niagara		–		–	12	–	12	.500
Tulane		–		–	12	–	12	.500
Penn State		–		–	10	–	10	.500
Georgia Tech		–		–	12	–	13	.480
Georgetown		–		–	11	–	12	.478
West Texas State		–		–	10	–	11	.476
Colorado State		–		–	11	–	13	.458
Navy		–		–	9	–	11	.450
Butler		–		–	11	–	14	.440
Denver		–		–	11	–	14	.440
Loyola (LA)		–		–	11	–	14	.440
Providence		–		–	11	–	14	.440
Syracuse		–		–	11	–	14	.440
Boston University		–		–	10	–	14	.417
Northern Illinois		–		–	10	–	14	.417
Colgate		–		–	10	–	16	.385
Hardin–Simmons		–		–	10	–	16	.385
Xavier		–		–	10	–	16	.385
Air Force		–		–	9	–	15	.375
NYU		–		–	8	–	16	.333
Creighton		–		–	8	–	17	.320
Pittsburgh		–		–	7	–	15	.318
Canisius		–		–	7	–	17	.292
Portland		–		–	5	–	21	.192
Centenary		–		–	3	–	23	.115
Rankings from AP Poll

The 1967–68 Marquette Warriors men's basketball team represented Marquette University during the 1967–68 NCAA University Division men's basketball season.

== Roster ==
1967–68 Marquette Warriors men's basketball team
Players	Coaches
Pos. / # / Name / Height / Weight / Year / Hometown; G / 24 / George Thompson / 6 ft 2 in (1.88 m) / 200 lb (91 kg) / Jr / Brooklyn, New York	Head coach: Al McGuire; Assistant coach(es) Legend: (C) Team captain; (S) Suspended; (I) Ineligible; (W) Walk-on; Injured; Current redshirt

== Schedule ==
Date time, TV	Rank^{#}	Opponent^{#}	Result	Record	Site city, state
Regular season
Dec 2, 1967*		St. Thomas (MN)	W 87–45	1–0	Milwaukee Arena; Milwaukee, Wisconsin
Dec 8, 1967*		South Dakota	W 89–65	2–0	Milwaukee Arena; Milwaukee, Wisconsin
Dec 11, 1967*		Air Force	W 87–61	3–0	Milwaukee Arena; Milwaukee, Wisconsin
Dec 15, 1967*		Florida State	W 78–58	4–0	Milwaukee Arena; Milwaukee, Wisconsin
Dec 16, 1967*		Wisconsin; Milwaukee Classic	L 62–70	4–1	Milwaukee Arena; Milwaukee, Wisconsin
Dec 20, 1967*		Villanova	W 81–63	5–1	Milwaukee Arena; Milwaukee, Wisconsin
Dec 22, 1967*		at Portland	W 73–65	6–1	Howard Hall; Portland, Oregon
Dec 27, 1967*		vs. Ohio State; Rainbow Classic	W 64–60	7–1	Honolulu International Center Arena; Honolulu, Hawaii
Dec 29, 1967*		vs. No. 2 Houston; Rainbow Classic	L 65–77	7–2	Honolulu International Center Arena; Honolulu, Hawaii
Dec 30, 1967*		vs. Northwestern; Rainbow Classic	W 80–67	8–2	Honolulu International Center Arena; Honolulu, Hawaii
Jan 3, 1968*		DePaul	W 71–50	9–2	Milwaukee Arena; Milwaukee, Wisconsin
Jan 6, 1968*		Dayton	W 83–68	10–2	Milwaukee Arena; Milwaukee, Wisconsin
Jan 11, 1968*		Wisconsin	W 71–56	11–2	Milwaukee Arena; Milwaukee, Wisconsin
Jan 13, 1968*		Denver	W 82–57	12–2	Milwaukee Arena; Milwaukee, Wisconsin
Jan 26, 1968*		at Loyola–Chicago	L 71–79	12–3	Alumni Gym; Chicago, Illinois
Jan 27, 1968*		at Detroit	W 80–70	13–3	Calihan Hall; Detroit, Michigan
Feb 3, 1968*		at DePaul	W 58–53	14–3	Alumni Hall; Chicago, Illinois
Feb 7, 1968*		Loyola–Chicago	W 71–57	15–3	Milwaukee Arena; Milwaukee, Wisconsin
Feb 10, 1968*		Xavier	W 72–57	16–3	Milwaukee Arena; Milwaukee, Wisconsin
Feb 14, 1968*		Wisconsin–Milwaukee	W 94–57	17–3	Milwaukee Arena; Milwaukee, Wisconsin
Feb 17, 1968*		Detroit	W 81–70	18–3	Milwaukee Arena; Milwaukee, Wisconsin
Feb 19, 1968*		at South Dakota	W 75–65	19–3	USD Armory; Vermillion, South Dakota
Feb 24, 1968*	No. 10	at St. John's	W 57–56	20–3	Alumni Hall; New York, New York
Feb 26, 1968*		at Xavier	L 83–88 ^{OT}	20–4	Schmidt Fieldhouse; Cincinnati, Ohio
Feb 29, 1968*		Creighton	W 75–57	21–4	Milwaukee Arena; Milwaukee, Wisconsin
Mar 2, 1968*		at Western Michigan	L 66–73	21–5	University Arena; Kalamazoo, Michigan
NCAA tournament
Mar 9, 1968*		vs. Bowling Green State; First round	W 72–71	22–5	Memorial Athletic and Convocation Center; Kent, Ohio
Mar 15, 1968*		vs. No. 5 Kentucky; Regional semifinal – Sweet Sixteen	L 89–107	22–6	Memorial Coliseum; Lexington, Kentucky
Mar 17, 1968*		vs. East Tennessee State; Regional consolation	W 69–57	23–6	Memorial Coliseum; Lexington, Kentucky
*Non-conference game. ^{#}Rankings from AP Poll. (#) Tournament seedings in parentheses. All times are in Eastern.
