= 1967–68 Dayton Flyers men's basketball team =

American college basketball season

1967–68 Dayton Flyers men's basketball

1968 National Invitation Tournament, Champions
- Conference: Independent
- Record: 21-9
- Head coach: Don Donoher
- Home arena: University of Dayton Fieldhouse

1967–68 NCAA University Division men's basketball independents standings
	Conf.				Overall
Team	W		L	PCT	W		L	PCT
No. 1 Houston		–		–	31	–	2	.939
No. 3 St. Bonaventure		–		–	23	–	2	.920
Army		–		–	20	–	5	.800
Marquette		–		–	23	–	6	.793
New Mexico State		–		–	23	–	6	.793
St. Francis (PA)		–		–	19	–	6	.760
Oklahoma City		–		–	20	–	7	.741
Duquesne		–		–	18	–	7	.720
Florida State		–		–	19	–	8	.704
Fordham		–		–	19	–	8	.704
St. John's		–		–	19	–	8	.704
Dayton		–		–	21	–	9	.700
Notre Dame		–		–	21	–	9	.700
Boston College		–		–	17	–	8	.680
Villanova		–		–	19	–	9	.679
Holy Cross		–		–	15	–	8	.652
Loyola Chicago		–		–	15	–	9	.625
Fairfield		–		–	16	–	10	.615
Texas Western		–		–	14	–	9	.609
Miami (FL)		–		–	17	–	11	.607
Rutgers		–		–	14	–	10	.583
Utah State		–		–	14	–	11	.560
VPI		–		–	14	–	11	.560
Southern Illinois		–		–	13	–	11	.542
DePaul		–		–	13	–	12	.520
Detroit		–		–	13	–	12	.520
Seattle		–		–	14	–	13	.519
Jacksonville		–		–	13	–	13	.500
Niagara		–		–	12	–	12	.500
Tulane		–		–	12	–	12	.500
Penn State		–		–	10	–	10	.500
Georgia Tech		–		–	12	–	13	.480
Georgetown		–		–	11	–	12	.478
West Texas State		–		–	10	–	11	.476
Colorado State		–		–	11	–	13	.458
Navy		–		–	9	–	11	.450
Butler		–		–	11	–	14	.440
Denver		–		–	11	–	14	.440
Loyola (LA)		–		–	11	–	14	.440
Providence		–		–	11	–	14	.440
Syracuse		–		–	11	–	14	.440
Boston University		–		–	10	–	14	.417
Northern Illinois		–		–	10	–	14	.417
Colgate		–		–	10	–	16	.385
Hardin–Simmons		–		–	10	–	16	.385
Xavier		–		–	10	–	16	.385
Air Force		–		–	9	–	15	.375
NYU		–		–	8	–	16	.333
Creighton		–		–	8	–	17	.320
Pittsburgh		–		–	7	–	15	.318
Canisius		–		–	7	–	17	.292
Portland		–		–	5	–	21	.192
Centenary		–		–	3	–	23	.115
Rankings from AP Poll

The 1967–68 Dayton Flyers men's basketball team represented the University of Dayton during the 1967-68 NCAA Division I season. The team competed as an independent program and finished the regular season with a 17–9 record.

The Flyers began the season ranked #6 in both the AP and UPI Coaches polls, but lost several early games and stood at 7–9 before a late season 10-game winning streak. The Flyers received an invitation to the NIT where they won four straight games at Madison Square Garden to claim the 1968 NIT championship against Kansas.

== Previous season ==
The Flyers finished the regular season 21-5 and were awarded an at-large berth in the NCAA tournament's Mideast bracket where they finished as the National Runner Up. The Flyers reached the program's first Elite Eight, Final Four, and national championship game before falling to champion UCLA.

== Roster ==
1967–68 Dayton Flyers men's basketball team
Players
Coaches

Pos.	#	Name	Height	Weight	Year	Previous school	Hometown
F	12	Ken May	6 ft 5 in (1.96 m)	210 lb (95 kg)	So	Belmont	Dayton, Ohio
G	13	Jim Gottschall	6 ft 2 in (1.88 m)	—	So	Chaminade	Dayton, Ohio
F	21	Don May	6 ft 4 in (1.93 m)	—	Sr	Belmont	Dayton, Ohio
G	22	Rudy Waterman	6 ft 1 in (1.85 m)	—	Sr	Westbury	Westbury, New York
F	23	Jim Wannemacher	6 ft 6 in (1.98 m)	—	Sr	Ottoville	Cloverdale, Ohio
G	24	Jerry Gottschall	6 ft 2 in (1.88 m)	—	So	Chaminade	Dayton, Ohio
C	31	Dan Obrovac	6 ft 10 in (2.08 m)	—	Jr	Canton Central Catholic	Canton, Ohio
G	32	Jerry Francis	6 ft 3 in (1.91 m)	—	So	Columbus West	Columbus, Ohio
F	33	Dan Sadlier	6 ft 6 in (1.98 m)	—	Jr	Lima Central Catholic	Lima, Ohio
F	35	George Janky	6 ft 8 in (2.03 m)	—	So	St Rita	Chicago, Illinois
G	40	Mike Blevins	6 ft 4 in (1.93 m)	—	So	Springboro	Lebanon, Ohio
F	42	Bobby Joe Hooper	6 ft 0 in (1.83 m)	—	Sr	Simon Kenton	Lees Creek, Ohio
F	43	Glinder Torain	6 ft 6 in (1.98 m)	—	Sr	Muncie Central	Muncie, Indiana
G		Tom Heckman	6 ft 1 in (1.85 m)	—	Jr	Ottawa-Glandorf	Glandorf, Ohio
G		Mike Leffel	6 ft 0 in (1.83 m)	—	So	Piqua	Piqua, Ohio
F		Ned Sharpenter	6 ft 7 in (2.01 m)	—	Jr	Marion Military Academy	Aurora, Illinois

Head coach

- Don Donoher

Assistant coach(es)

- Chuck Grigsby
- Bill Cassidy
- Pat Haley

Legend

- (C) Team captain
- (S) Suspended
- (I) Ineligible
- (W) Walk-on
- Injured
- Current redshirt

== Schedule ==
Date time, TV	Rank^{#}	Opponent^{#}	Result	Record	Site city, state
December 2	No. 6	Northern Michigan	W 78-61	1–0	University of Dayton Fieldhouse (5,882); Dayton, Ohio
December 5	No. 6	Miami (OH)	L 61-64	1-1	University of Dayton Fieldhouse (5,882); Dayton, Ohio
December 9	No. 6	at Eastern Kentucky	L 75-76	1-2	Alumni Coliseum (7,250); Richmond, Kentucky
December 13		No. 5 Louisville	W 63-47	2-2	University of Dayton Fieldhouse (5,882); Dayton, Ohio
December 16		Rice	W 82-58	3-2	University of Dayton Fieldhouse (5,882); Dayton, Ohio
December 22		at No. 7 Kentucky; UK Invitational Tournament	L 85-88	3-3	Memorial Coliseum (11,500); Lexington, Kentucky
December 23		vs. Cincinnati; UK Invitational Tournament	L 70-71	3-4	Memorial Coliseum (11,500); Lexington, Kentucky
December 27		Portland	W 124-68	4-4	University of Dayton Fieldhouse (5,882); Dayton, Ohio
December 30		at Cincinnati	L 68-82	4-5	Armory Fieldhouse (6,883); Cincinnati, Ohio
January 3		at Xavier	W 83-80	5-5	Schmidt Fieldhouse (3,765); Cincinnati, Ohio
January 6		at Marquette	L 68-83	5-6	Milwaukee Arena (11,138); Milwaukee, Wisconsin
January 11		St Louis	W 57-56	6-6	University of Dayton Fieldhouse (5,882); Dayton, Ohio
January 13		Detroit	W 86-74	7-6	University of Dayton Fieldhouse (5,882); Dayton, Ohio
January 17		at Western Kentucky	L 74-75 ^{OT}	7-7	E. A. Diddle Arena (9,122); Bowling Green, Kentucky
January 20		DePaul	L 65–70	7-8	University of Dayton Fieldhouse (5,882); Dayton, Ohio
January 23		at Louisville	L 72-73	7-9	Freedom Hall (11,081); Louisville, Kentucky
January 29		Loyola (LA)	W 81-65	8-9	University of Dayton Fieldhouse (5,882); Dayton, Ohio
February 1		Miami (FL)	W 98-60	9-9	University of Dayton Fieldhouse (5,882); Dayton, Ohio
February 3		St Joseph's	W 86-64	10-9	University of Dayton Fieldhouse (5,882); Dayton, Ohio
February 7		Xavier	W 64-56	11-9	University of Dayton Fieldhouse (5,882); Dayton, Ohio
February 10		Fairfield	W 95-70	12-9	University of Dayton Fieldhouse (5,882); Dayton, Ohio
February 17		at DePaul	W 70-58	13-9	Alumni Hall (3,017); Chicago, Illinois
February 21		Loyola (IL)	W 91-75	14-9	University of Dayton Fieldhouse (5,882); Dayton, Ohio
February 24		at Canisius	W 82-64	15-9	Buffalo Memorial Auditorium (4,110); Buffalo, New York
February 28		St Joseph's (IN)	W 99-66	16-9	University of Dayton Fieldhouse (5,882); Dayton, Ohio
March 2		at Miami (OH)	W 63–51	17-9	Withrow Court (3,914); Oxford, Ohio
National Invitational Tournament
March 16		vs. West Virginia; First round	W 87-68	18–9	Madison Square Garden (16,127); New York City, New York
March 19		vs. Fordham; Quarterfinals	W 61-60	19–9	Madison Square Garden (18,683); New York City, New York
March 21		vs. Notre Dame; Semifinals	W 76-74 ^{OT}	20–9	Madison Square Garden (19,500); New York City, New York
March 23		vs. Kansas; Finals	W 61-48	21–9	Madison Square Garden (19,008); New York City, New York
*Non-conference game. ^{#}Rankings from AP Poll. (#) Tournament seedings in parentheses.

== Rankings ==
Ranking movements Legend: ██ Increase in ranking ██ Decrease in ranking — = Not ranked
	Week																
Poll	Pre	1	2	3	4	5	6	7	8	9	10	11	12	13	14	15	Final
AP	6	6	—	—	—	—	—	—	—	—	—	—	—	—	—	—	—
Coaches	6	6	16	15	—	—	—	—	—	—	—	—	—	—	—	—	—
