= 1967–68 Iowa State Cyclones men's basketball team =

American college basketball season

1967–68 Iowa State Cyclones men's basketball
- Conference: Big Eight Conference

Ranking
- Coaches: No. 20
- Record: 12–13 (8–6 Big Eight)
- Head coach: Glen Anderson (9th season)
- Home arena: Iowa State Armory

1967–68 Big Eight Conference men's basketball standings
	Conf.				Overall
Team	W		L	PCT	W		L	PCT
Kansas State	11	–	3	.786	19	–	9	.679
Kansas	10	–	4	.714	22	–	8	.733
Nebraska	8	–	6	.571	15	–	10	.600
Oklahoma	8	–	6	.571	13	–	13	.500
Iowa State	8	–	6	.571	12	–	13	.480
Missouri	5	–	9	.357	10	–	16	.385
Oklahoma State	3	–	11	.214	10	–	16	.385
Colorado	3	–	11	.214	9	–	16	.360
Rankings from AP Poll

The 1967–68 Iowa State Cyclones men's basketball team represented Iowa State University during the 1967–68 NCAA Division I men's basketball season. The Cyclones were coached by Glen Anderson, who was in his ninth season with the Cyclones. They played their home games at the Iowa State Armory in Ames, Iowa.

Don Smith (later known as Zaid Abdul-Aziz) won Big Eight Conference Player of the Year.

They finished the season 12–13, 8–6 in Big Eight play to finish tied for third place.

== Roster ==
1967–68 Iowa State Cyclones men's basketball team
Players
Coaches

Pos.	#	Name	Height	Weight	Year	Hometown
G		Jim Abrahamson	6 ft 0 in (1.83 m)	—	So
F		Bill Cain	6 ft 7 in (2.01 m)	—	So
F		Dave Collins	6 ft 2 in (1.88 m)	—	So
		Steve Cooper	—	—
G		Tom Goodman	5 ft 10 in (1.78 m)	—	Jr
		Jim Hamberlin	—	—
F		Bob Hannan	6 ft 10 in (2.08 m)	—
G		Dave Hartman	6 ft 3 in (1.91 m)	—	Jr
F		Cole Johansen	6 ft 5 in (1.96 m)	—	Sr
F		Ron Kaufman	6 ft 5 in (1.96 m)	—	So
F		Tom Kreamer	6 ft 5 in (1.96 m)	—	Jr
G		John McGonigle	6 ft 3 in (1.91 m)	—	Sr
G		Mike Murray	6 ft 1 in (1.85 m)	—	So
F		Tom Pyle	6 ft 3 in (1.91 m)	—	Jr
F		Don Smith (C)	6 ft 8 in (2.03 m)	—	Sr	Brooklyn, New York
		Wayne Tjernagel	—	—

Head coach

- Glen Anderson

Assistant coach(es)

Legend

- (C) Team captain
- (S) Suspended
- (I) Ineligible
- (W) Walk-on
- Injured
- Current redshirt

== Schedule and results ==
Date time, TV	Rank^{#}	Opponent^{#}	Result	Record	Site city, state
Regular season
December 1, 1967*; 7:35 pm		South Dakota	W 101–54	1–0	Iowa State Armory; Ames, Iowa
December 5, 1967*; 7:35 pm		Northern Iowa; Iowa Big Four	W 99–73	2–0	Iowa State Armory; Ames, Iowa
December 8, 1967*; 9:55 pm		at San Fernando State	L 72–87	2–1	Matador Gymnasium (1,800); Northridge, California
December 9, 1967*; 10:00 pm, KTLA (delay)		at No. 1 UCLA	L 80–121	2–2	Pauley Pavilion; Los Angeles
December 12, 1967*; 7:35 pm		Northern Illinois	W 77–69	3–2	Iowa State Armory; Ames, Iowa
December 14, 1967*; 7:35 pm, WOI		Drake; Iowa Big Four	W 88–83	4–2	Iowa State Armory; Ames, Iowa
December 20, 1967*; 8:00 pm		at DePaul	L 63–67	4–3	Alumni Hall; Chicago
December 27, 1967*; 7:00 pm		vs. Colorado; Big Eight Holiday Tournament Quarterfinals	L 62–80	4–4	Municipal Auditorium; Kansas City, Missouri
December 29, 1967*; 1:00 pm		vs. Missouri; Big Eight Holiday Tournament Consolation Semifinals	L 63–65	4–5	Municipal Auditorium; Kansas City, Missouri
December 30, 1967*; 1:00 pm		vs. Oklahoma; Big Eight Holiday Tournament Seventh Place	L 61–76	4–6	Municipal Auditorium; Kansas City, Missouri
January 5, 1968; 7:30 pm		Nebraska	W 85–70	5–6 (1–0)	Iowa State Armory; Ames, Iowa
January 8, 1968; 7:35 pm, WOI (delay)		Kansas	L 67–68	5–7 (1–1)	Iowa State Armory; Ames, Iowa
January 13, 1968; 7:30 pm		at Kansas State	W 79–74	6–7 (2–1)	Ahearn Fieldhouse; Manhattan, Kansas
January 17, 1968*; 8:00 pm		at Drake; Iowa Big Four	L 67–72	6–8	Veterans Memorial Auditorium; Des Moines, Iowa
January 20, 1968; 1:10 pm, Big Eight		at Missouri	L 67–72	6–9 (2–2)	Brewer Fieldhouse; Columbia, Missouri
January 25, 1968; 7:35 pm, WOI (delay)		Oklahoma	W 80–70	7–9 (3–2)	Iowa State Armory; Ames, Iowa
January 27, 1968; 1:10 pm, Big Eight		Oklahoma State	W 61–53	8–9 (4–2)	Iowa State Armory; Ames, Iowa
February 3, 1968; 7:35 pm, WOI (delay)		Colorado	W 84–66	9–9 (5–2)	Iowa State Armory; Ames, Iowa
February 10, 1968; 7:35 pm		at Oklahoma	L 68–87	9–10 (5–3)	OU Field House; Norman, Oklahoma
February 12, 1968; 7:35 pm		at Oklahoma State	W 49–48	10–10 (6–3)	Gallagher Hall; Stillwater, Oklahoma
February 17, 1968; 7:35 pm, WOI (delay)		Missouri	W 73–70 ^{OT}	11–10 (7–3)	Iowa State Armory; Ames, Iowa
February 28, 1968; 9:05 pm		at Colorado	L 76–91	11–11 (7–4)	Balch Fieldhouse; Boulder, Colorado
March 1, 1968; 7:35 pm		at Nebraska	W 93–92 ^{OT}	12–11 (8–4)	Nebraska Coliseum; Lincoln, Nebraska
March 4, 1968; 7:35 pm, WOI (delay)		Kansas State	L 61–63	12–12 (8–5)	Iowa State Armory; Ames, Iowa
March 9, 1968; 1:00 pm, Big Eight		at Kansas	L 58–91	12–13 (8–6)	Allen Fieldhouse; Lawrence, Kansas
*Non-conference game. ^{#}Rankings from AP poll. (#) Tournament seedings in parentheses. All times are in Central Time.
