= 1967–68 Princeton Tigers men's basketball team =

American college basketball season

1967–68 Princeton Tigers men's basketball

Ivy League Co-Champions

Ivy League one-game playoff, Lost
- Conference: Ivy League

Ranking
- Coaches: No. 15
- AP: No. unranked (peaked at #8)
- Record: 20–6 (12–3, 1st-t Ivy)
- Head coach: Pete Carril
- Captain: Joe Heiser
- Home arena: Dillon Gymnasium

The 1967–68 Princeton Tigers men's basketball team represented Princeton University in intercollegiate college basketball during the 1967–68 NCAA University Division men's basketball season. Pete Carril served as head coach and the team captain was Joe Heiser. The team played its home games in the Dillon Gymnasium on the University campus in Princeton, New Jersey. The team was the co-champion of the Ivy League, but lost a one-game playoff for an invitation to the 23-team 1968 NCAA Men's Division I Basketball Tournament.

The team posted a 20–6 overall record and a 12–3 conference record. After finishing the regular season tied for the league championship, the team lost the March 5, 1968, one-game Ivy League playoff game at St. John's University's Alumni Hall in Jamaica, Queens in New York City against the Columbia Lions by a 92–74 margin.

During the season, the team spent two weeks of the sixteen-week season ranked in the Associated Press Top Ten Poll, peaking at number eight and ending the season unranked. However, the team also finished the season ranked number fifteen in the final UPI Coaches' Poll, which included twenty teams.

The entire All-Ivy League conference first team was composed of members of Columbia and Princeton with two Lions accompanying the three Tigers: Heiser, Geoff Petrie and Chris Thomforde. This was the second time that one team had three first team selections and the second season in a row that Princeton did so. However, none of the three All-Ivy Princeton players were among the league's top five scorers. Nonetheless, Heiser was the national statistical champion in free throw percentage by making 90.0% of his free throws (117 of 130). His career 88.8% free throw percentage surpassed Bill Bradley's 1965 87.6% mark as the Ivy League record until it was eclipsed by Jim Barton in 1989. Following the season, two players were selected in the 1968 NBA draft: Heiser by the Baltimore Bullets with the 68th overall selection in the 6th round and John Haarlow by the New York Knicks with the 177th overall selection in the 13th round.

== Rankings ==
Ranking movement Legend: ██ Increase in ranking. ██ Decrease in ranking.
Poll	Pre	Wk 1	Wk 2	Wk 3	Wk 4	Wk 5	Wk 6	Wk 7	Wk 8	Wk 9	Wk 10	Wk 11	Wk 12	Wk 13	Wk 14	Final
AP Top 10 Poll	8	-	10	-	-	-	-	-	-	-	-	-	-	-	-	-
