= 1967–68 Santa Clara Broncos men's basketball team =

American college basketball season

1967–68 Santa Clara Broncos men's basketball

West Coast Athletic Conference champions

NCAA tournament, Elite Eight
- Conference: West Coast Athletic Conference

Ranking
- Coaches: No. 17
- Record: 22–4 (11–1 WCAC)
- Head coach: Dick Garibaldi
- Home arena: San Jose Civic Auditorium

1967–68 West Coast Athletic Conference men's basketball standings
	Conf.				Overall
Team	W		L	PCT	W		L	PCT
Santa Clara	11	–	1	.917	22	–	4	.846
Loyola (Calif.)	10	–	2	.833	19	–	6	.760
San Francisco	8	–	4	.667	16	–	10	.615
San Jose State		–		–	13	–	12	.520
Pacific	5	–	7	.417	17	–	9	.654
UC Santa Barbara	3	–	9	.250	9	–	17	.346
Saint Mary's	3	–	9	.250	4	–	20	.167
Pepperdine	2	–	10	.167	9	–	17	.346
Rankings from AP poll

The 1967–68 Santa Clara Broncos men's basketball team represented Santa Clara University as a member of the West Coast Athletic Conference during the 1967–68 NCAA University Division men's basketball season. They finished the season with a 22–4 record (11–1 WCAC) and made the NCAA tournament, reaching the Elite Eight before falling to mighty UCLA. They were led by second-year head coach Dick Garibaldi.

== Roster ==
1967–68 Santa Clara Broncos men's basketball team
Players
Coaches

Pos.	#	Name	Height	Weight	Year	Hometown
F		Bud Ogden	6 ft 6 in (1.98 m)	—	Jr	San Luis Obispo, California
F		Ralph Ogden	6 ft 5 in (1.96 m)	—	So	San Luis Obispo, California
C		Dennis Awtrey	6 ft 10 in (2.08 m)	225 lb (102 kg)	So

Head coach

- Dick Garibaldi

Assistant coach(es)

Legend

- (C) Team captain
- (S) Suspended
- (I) Ineligible
- (W) Walk-on
- Injured
- Current redshirt

== Schedule and results ==
Date time, TV	Rank^{#}	Opponent^{#}	Result	Record	Site city, state
Regular Season
Dec 4, 1967*		San Francisco State	W 106–54	1–0	San Jose Civic Auditorium; San Jose, California
Dec 4, 1967*		Creighton	W 92–80	2–0	San Jose Civic Auditorium; San Jose, California
Dec 15, 1967*		vs. Loyola–Chicago; Cable Car Classic	W 91–88	3–0	San Francisco Civic Auditorium; San Francisco, California
Dec 16, 1967*		vs. Western Kentucky; Cable Car Classic	W 75–68	4–0	San Francisco Civic Auditorium; San Francisco, California
Dec 18, 1967*		at Nevada	W 80–75	5–0	Virginia Street Gymnasium; Reno, Nevada
Dec 22, 1967*		at Brigham Young	W 80–75	6–0	Smith Fieldhouse; Provo, Utah
Dec 23, 1967*		at Brigham Young	L 46–91	6–1	Smith Fieldhouse; Provo, Utah
Dec 27, 1967*		vs. NYU; Hurricane Classic	L 88–93	6–2	Miami Beach Exhibition Hall; Miami, Florida
Dec 28, 1967*		vs. Dartmouth; Hurricane Classic	W 77–69	7–2	Miami Beach Exhibition Hall; Miami, Florida
Jan 6, 1968		at San Francisco	L 68–70	7–3 (0–1)	War Memorial Gymnasium; San Francisco, California
Jan 12, 1968		at Pepperdine	W 102–80	8–3 (1–1)	Campus Gym; Malibu, California
Jan 13, 1968		at Loyola Marymount	W 75–71	9–3 (2–1)	Loyola Memorial Gymnasium; Los Angeles, California
Jan 20, 1968		at UC Santa Barbara	W 85–74	10–3 (3–1)	Rob Gym; Santa Barbara, California
Jan 24, 1968		at San Jose State	W 82–64	11–3	Spartan Gym; San Jose, California
Feb 2, 1968		UC Santa Barbara	W 85–72	12–3 (4–1)	San Jose Civic Auditorium; San Jose, California
Feb 3, 1968*		Cal State Hayward	W 97–74	13–3	San Jose Civic Auditorium; San Jose, California
Feb 9, 1968		at Pacific	W 98–83	14–3 (5–1)	Pacific Pavilion; Stockton, California
Feb 10, 1968		at Saint Mary's	W 107–78	15–3 (6–1)	Madigan Gym; Moraga, California
Feb 17, 1968		San Francisco	W 70–60	16–3 (7–1)	San Jose Civic Auditorium; San Jose, California
Feb 24, 1968		at San Jose State	W 86–66	17–3	Spartan Gym; San Jose, California
Mar 1, 1968*		Saint Mary's	W 72–56	18–3 (8–1)	San Jose Civic Auditorium; San Jose, California
Mar 2, 1968		Pacific	W 72–68	19–3 (9–1)	San Jose Civic Auditorium; San Jose, California
Mar 8, 1968		Pepperdine	W 94–66	20–3 (10–1)	San Jose Civic Auditorium; San Jose, California
Mar 9, 1968		Loyola Marymount	W 77–62	21–3 (11–1)	San Jose Civic Auditorium; San Jose, California
NCAA Tournament
Mar 15, 1968*		vs. No. 6 New Mexico; Regional Semifinal – Sweet Sixteen	W 86–73	22–3	University Arena; Albuquerque, New Mexico
Mar 16, 1968*		vs. No. 2 UCLA; Regional Final – Elite Eight	L 66–87	22–4	University Arena; Albuquerque, New Mexico
*Non-conference game. ^{#}Rankings from AP Poll. (#) Tournament seedings in parentheses. W=West. All times are in Pacific Time.
