= 1967–68 NCAA University Division men's basketball rankings =

- Season: 1967–68
- NCAA Tournament: 1968
- Preseason No. 1: UCLA
- NCAA Tournament Champions: UCLA
NCAA University Division men's basketball rankings


The 1967–68 NCAA University Division men's basketball rankings was made up of two human polls, the AP Poll and the Coaches Poll.

== Legend ==
	Increase in ranking
	Decrease in ranking
	New to rankings from previous week
Italics	Number of first place votes
(#–#)	Win–loss record
т	Tied with team above or below also with this symbol

== AP Poll ==
	Preseason	Week 2 Dec. 5	Week 3 Dec. 12	Week 4 Dec. 19	Week 5 Dec. 26	Week 6 Jan. 2	Week 7 Jan. 9	Week 8 Jan. 16	Week 9 Jan. 23	Week 10 Jan. 30	Week 11 Feb. 6	Week 12 Feb. 13	Week 13 Feb. 20	Week 14 Feb. 27	Week 15 Mar. 5	Final Mar. 12	
1.	UCLA	UCLA (1–0)	UCLA (3–0)	UCLA (3–0)	UCLA (5–0)	UCLA (8–0)	UCLA (10–0)	UCLA (12–0)	Houston (17–0)	Houston (18–0)	Houston (20–0)	Houston (21–0)	Houston (23–0)	Houston (25–0)	Houston (27–0)	Houston (29–0)	1.
2.	Houston	Houston (1–0)	Houston (4–0)	Houston (7–0)	Houston (10–0)	Houston (13–0)	Houston (15–0)	Houston (16–0)	UCLA (13–1)	UCLA (15–1)	UCLA (16–1)	UCLA (17–1)	UCLA (20–1)	UCLA (21–1)	UCLA (24–1)	UCLA (25–1)	2.
3.	Louisville	Louisville (1–0)	Vanderbilt (3–0)	Vanderbilt (5–0)	Indiana (6–0)	North Carolina (7–1)	North Carolina (9–1)	North Carolina (11–1)	North Carolina (11–1)	North Carolina (12–1)	North Carolina (14–1)	North Carolina (17–1)	North Carolina (20–1)	North Carolina (22–1)	St. Bonaventure (21–0)	St. Bonaventure (23–0)	3.
4.	North Carolina	Kansas (1–0)	Kentucky (4–0)	North Carolina (4–1)	Tennessee (4–0)	Vanderbilt (9–1)	Kentucky (8–1)	Tennessee (9–1)	New Mexico (16–0)	New Mexico (16–0)	St. Bonaventure (16–0)	St. Bonaventure (17–0)	St. Bonaventure (18–0)	St. Bonaventure (19–0)	Kentucky (21–4)	North Carolina (25–3)	4.
5.	Kansas	North Carolina (1–0)	Louisville (2–1)	Indiana (5–0)	North Carolina (4–1)	Kentucky (7–1)	Tennessee (7–1)	Utah (13–1)	St. Bonaventure (13–0)	St. Bonaventure (15–0)	Tennessee (14–2)	New Mexico (19–1)	Kentucky (17–4)	Kentucky (19–4)	North Carolina (22–3)	Kentucky (21–4)	5.
6.	Dayton	Dayton (1–0)	Boston College (2–0)	Davidson (5–1)	Kentucky (6–1)	Tennessee (6–1)	Utah (11–1)	New Mexico (14–0)	Tennessee (10–2)	Tennessee (13–2)	New Mexico (17–1)	Columbia (15–3)	Columbia (17–3)	Columbia (19–3)	Duke (20–4)	New Mexico (23–3)	6.
7.	Boston College	Purdue (0–1)	North Carolina (2–1)	Kentucky (4–1)	Utah (8–0)	Utah (10–1)	St. Bonaventure (11–0)	St. Bonaventure (12–0)	Vanderbilt (12–3)	Vanderbilt (13–3)	Columbia (13–3)	Tennessee (15–3)	New Mexico (20–2)	New Mexico (22–2)	New Mexico (23–3)	Columbia (22–4)	7.
8.	Princeton	Vanderbilt (1–0)	Davidson (4–0)	Boston College (3–0)	Davidson (7–1)	Oklahoma City (8–0)	Vanderbilt (10–2)	Kentucky (9–2)	Columbia (11–3)	Columbia (11–3)	Kentucky (13–4)	Kentucky (15–4)	Duke (16–3)	Marquette (20–3)	Columbia (20–4)	Davidson (23–4)	8.
9.	Vanderbilt	Kentucky (1–0)	Indiana (3–0)	Tennessee (3–0)	Vanderbilt (7–1)	St. Bonaventure (9–0)	New Mexico (13–0)	Vanderbilt (11–3)	Kentucky (10–3)	Duke (10–2)	Vanderbilt (14–4)	Vanderbilt (16–4)	Vanderbilt (17–4)	Louisville (18–6)	Louisville (19–6)	Louisville (20–6)	9.
10.	Davidson	Boston College (0–0)	Princeton (4–0)	Bradley (7–0)	Boston College (5–1)	New Mexico (10–0)	Columbia (9–3)	Columbia (10–3)	Utah (13–3)	Kentucky (11–4)	New Mexico State (17–2)	Duke (14–3)	Marquette (18–3)	Duke (18–4)	Davidson (20–4)	Duke (21–5)	10.
	Preseason	Week 2 Dec. 5	Week 3 Dec. 12	Week 4 Dec. 19	Week 5 Dec. 26	Week 6 Jan. 2	Week 7 Jan. 9	Week 8 Jan. 16	Week 9 Jan. 23	Week 10 Jan. 30	Week 11 Feb. 6	Week 12 Feb. 13	Week 13 Feb. 20	Week 14 Feb. 27	Week 15 Mar. 5	Final Mar. 12	
		Dropped: Princeton (1–0); Davidson (2–0)	Dropped: Kansas (1–2); Dayton (1–2); Purdue (2–2)	Dropped: Louisville (2–2); Princeton (5–1)	Dropped: Bradley (8–1)	Dropped: Indiana (6–3); Davidson (8–2); Boston College (6–3)	Dropped: Oklahoma City (8–2)	None	None	Dropped: Utah (13–6)	Dropped: Duke (11–3)	Dropped: New Mexico State (17–4)	Dropped: Tennessee (15–5)	Dropped: Vanderbilt (19–5)	Dropped: Marquette (21–5)	None	

== UPI Poll ==
	Preseason	Week 2 Dec. 5	Week 3 Dec. 12	Week 4 Dec. 19	Week 5 Dec. 26	Week 6 Jan. 2	Week 7 Jan. 9	Week 8 Jan. 16	Week 9 Jan. 23	Week 10 Jan. 30	Week 11 Feb. 6	Week 12 Feb. 13	Week 13 Feb. 20	Week 14 Feb. 27	Week 15 Mar. 5	Final Mar. 12	
1.	UCLA	UCLA (1–0)	UCLA (3–0)	UCLA (3–0)	UCLA (5–0)	UCLA (8–0)	UCLA (10–0)	UCLA (12–0)	Houston (17–0)	Houston (18–0)	Houston (20–0)	Houston (21–0)	Houston (23–0)	Houston (25–0)	Houston (27–0)	Houston (29–0)	1.
2.	Houston	Louisville (1–0)	Houston (4–0)	Houston (7–0)	Houston (10–0)	Houston (13–0)	Houston (15–0)	Houston (16–0)	UCLA (13–1)	UCLA (15–1)	UCLA (16–1)	UCLA (17–1)	UCLA (20–1)	UCLA (21–1)	UCLA (24–1)	UCLA (25–1)	2.
3.	Kansas	Houston (1–0)	Vanderbilt (3–0)	Vanderbilt (5–0)	Vanderbilt (7–1)	Vanderbilt (9–1)	North Carolina (9–1)	North Carolina (11–1)	North Carolina (11–1)	North Carolina (12–1)	North Carolina (14–1)	North Carolina (17–1)	North Carolina (20–1)	North Carolina (22–1)	St. Bonaventure (21–0)	St. Bonaventure (23–0)	3.
4.	Louisville	Kansas (1–0)	Louisville (2–1)	North Carolina (4–1)	North Carolina (4–1)	North Carolina (7–1)	Kentucky (8–1)	Tennessee (9–1)	New Mexico (16–0)	New Mexico (16–0)	Tennessee (14–2)	St. Bonaventure (17–0)	St. Bonaventure (18–0)	St. Bonaventure (19–0)	North Carolina (22–3)	North Carolina (25–3)	4.
5.	North Carolina	North Carolina (1–0)	Boston College (2–0)	Boston College (3–0)	Indiana (6–0)	Kentucky (7–1)	Tennessee (7–1)	Utah (13–1)	St. Bonaventure (13–0)	St. Bonaventure (15–0)	New Mexico (17–1)	New Mexico (19–1)	Kentucky (17–4)	Kentucky (19–4)	Kentucky (21–4)	Kentucky (21–4)	5.
6.	Dayton	Dayton (1–0)	Kentucky (4–0)	Indiana (5–0)	Tennessee (4–0)	Tennessee (6–1) т	Vanderbilt (10–2)	New Mexico (14–0)	Tennessee (10–2)	Tennessee (13–2)	St. Bonaventure (16–0)	Tennessee (15–3)	Columbia (17–3)	Columbia (19–3)	New Mexico (23–3)	Columbia (22–4)	6.
7.	Boston College	Princeton (1–0)	Princeton (4–0)	Tennessee (3–0)	Kentucky (6–1)	Utah (10–1) т	Utah (11–1)	Kentucky (9–2)	Columbia (11–3)	Columbia (11–3)	Columbia (13–3)	Columbia (15–3)	New Mexico (20–2)	New Mexico (22–2)	Duke (20–4)	New Mexico (23–3)	7.
8.	Princeton	Purdue (0–1)	North Carolina (2–1)	Kentucky (4–1)	Boston College (5–1)	Oklahoma City (8–0)	New Mexico (13–0)	St. Bonaventure (12–0)	Utah (13–3)	Vanderbilt (13–3)	Kentucky (13–4)	Kentucky (15–4)	Vanderbilt (17–4)	Louisville (18–6)	Louisville (19–6)	Louisville (20–6)	8.
9.	Vanderbilt	Boston College (0–0)	Davidson (4–0)	Louisville (2–2)	St. John's (6–1)	Columbia (7–3)	St. Bonaventure (11–0)	Vanderbilt (11–3)	Kentucky (10–3)	Kentucky (11–4)	Vanderbilt (14–4)	Vanderbilt (16–4)	Duke (16–3)	Duke (18–4)	Columbia (20–4)	Davidson (23–4)	9.
10.	Tennessee	Tennessee (1–0)	Tennessee (1–0)	Davidson (5–1) т	Kansas (6–2)	Davidson (8–2)	Davidson (9–3)	Columbia (10–3)	Vanderbilt (12–3)	Duke (10–2)	Duke (11–3)	Duke (14–3)	Louisville (16–6)	Marquette (20–3)	Vanderbilt (19–6)	Marquette (22–5)	10.
11.	Indiana	Vanderbilt (1–0)	Kansas (1–2)	Princeton (5–1) т	Davidson (7–1)	St. John's (8–2)	Columbia (9–3)	Kansas (11–4)	Cincinnati (12–3)	Utah (13–6)	Louisville (12–6)	Louisville (14–6)	Tennessee (15–5)	Vanderbilt (19–5)	Davidson (20–4)	Duke (21–5)	11.
12.	Davidson	Davidson (2–0)	Indiana (3–0)	Wyoming (5–1)	Louisville (3–3)	Duke (5–1)	Louisville (7–4)	UTEP (10–2)	Marquette (12–2)	Boston College (9–4) т	New Mexico State (17–2)	New Mexico State (17–4)	Kansas (15–5)	New Mexico State (19–4)	Princeton (20–5)	New Mexico State (22–5)	12.
13.	Cincinnati	Kentucky (1–0)	Wyoming (4–0)	Bradley (7–0) т	Utah (8–0)	Wyoming (8–3)	Kansas (10–3)	Duke (9–2)	Duke (9–2)	New Mexico State (15–2) т	Boston College (10–5) т	Ohio State (13–5)	New Mexico State (17–4)	Tennessee (17–6)	New Mexico State (20–5)	Vanderbilt (20–6)	13.
14.	UTEP	Cincinnati (1–0)	Loyola-Chicago (3–0)	Kansas (3–2) т	New Mexico (8–0) т	Indiana (6–3)	Wyoming (9–3)	Davidson (10–4) т	Davidson (10–4)	Cincinnati (12–4)	Davidson (13–4) т	Army (17–3) т	Princeton (17–4)	USC (17–6)	Marquette (21–5)	Kansas State (19–7)	14.
15.	Loyola-Chicago т	St. John's (1–0)	Purdue (2–2)	Dayton (3–2)	Wisconsin (5–1) т	New Mexico (10–0) т	St. John's (9–3)	Louisville (8–5) т	Tulsa (10–3)	Wyoming (13–4)	Wyoming (14–5)	Princeton (15–4) т	Marquette (18–3) т	Davidson (17–4) т	Tennessee (19–6)	Princeton (20–6)	15.
16.	St. John's т	Indiana (2–0)	Dayton (1–2)	Utah (6–0)	Duke (4–1)	Louisville (5–4) т	Princeton (9–3)	Princeton (11–3) т	New Mexico State (15–2) т	Drake (14–2) т	Ohio State (12–4)	Marquette (16–3)	Utah (17–6) т	Utah (17–7) т	Western Kentucky (18–7)	Army (20–4)	16.
17.	Wyoming т	Syracuse (1–0)	Cincinnati (3–0)	St. John's (5–1)	Bradley (8–1) т	St. Bonaventure (9–0)	Boston College (7–3) т	Cincinnati (9–3)	Princeton (11–3) т	Marquette (13–3) т	Drake (15–3)	Fordham (14–4)	Davidson (16–4)	Kansas State (16–7)	Iowa (16–7)	Santa Clara (21–3)	17.
18.	Marquette	Utah (2–0)	St. John's (2–1)	Wisconsin (4–1)	Princeton (5–2) т	Tulsa (7–1)	Western Kentucky (8–3) т	Tulsa (9–2)	UTEP (10–3) т	Davidson (11–4)	Florida (14–6)	Loyola-Chicago (12–5) т	Army (18–4)	Princeton (18–5)	Santa Clara (19–3)	Utah (17–9)	18.
19.	Duke т	BYU (2–0) т	Bradley (5–0) т	Duke (4–1) т	Florida (4–2)	Temple (8–2)	Oklahoma City (8–2) т	Marquette (12–2) т	Wyoming (11–4)	Northwestern (9–5) т	Utah State (10–10)	Wyoming (15–5) т	Wyoming (15–7)	Western Kentucky (17–7)	Kansas State (18–7) т	Bradley (19–9)	19.
20.	Niagara т	Loyola-Chicago (1–0) т Wyoming (2–0) т	Duke (3–0) т	Purdue (4–3) т	California (6–0) т Tulsa (7–1) т	Western Kentucky (7–2)	UTEP (9–2) т	Oklahoma City (9–3) т St. John's (11–3) т	St. John's (12–3)	Princeton (12–3) т	Kansas (13–5)	Davidson (14–4)	USC (15–6)	West Virginia (17–7)	Utah (17–9) т	Iowa State (12–13)	20.
	Preseason	Week 2 Dec. 5	Week 3 Dec. 12	Week 4 Dec. 19	Week 5 Dec. 26	Week 6 Jan. 2	Week 7 Jan. 9	Week 8 Jan. 16	Week 9 Jan. 23	Week 10 Jan. 30	Week 11 Feb. 6	Week 12 Feb. 13	Week 13 Feb. 20	Week 14 Feb. 27	Week 15 Mar. 5	Final Mar. 12	
		Dropped: UTEP; Marquette; Duke; Niagara	Dropped: Syracuse; Utah; BYU	Dropped: Loyola-Chicago; Cincinnati	Dropped: Wyoming; Dayton; Purdue	Dropped: Boston College; Kansas; Wisconsin; Bradley; Princeton; Florida; California	Dropped: Duke; Indiana; Tulsa; Temple	Dropped: Wyoming; Boston College; Western Kentucky	Dropped: Kansas; Louisville; Oklahoma City	Dropped: Tulsa; UTEP; St. John's	Dropped: Utah; Cincinnati; Marquette; Northwestern; Princeton	Dropped: Boston College; Drake; Florida; Utah State; Kansas	Dropped: Ohio State; Fordham; Loyola-Chicago	Dropped: Kansas; Army; Wyoming	Dropped: USC; West Virginia	Dropped: Tennessee (19–7); Western Kentucky (18–8); Iowa (16–9)	
