= 1968 NAIA basketball tournament =

College basketball tournament

1968 NAIA men's basketball tournament
- Season: 1967–68
- Teams: 32
- Finals site: Municipal Auditorium; Kansas City, Missouri
- Champions: Central State (Ohio) (2nd title, 2nd title game, 2nd Final Four)
- Runner-up: Fairmont State (W.Va.) (1st title game, 2nd Final Four)
- Semifinalists: Wisconsin-Oshkosh (1st Final Four); Westminster (Pa.) (4th Final Four)
- Coach of the year: Jack Dobbins (Northeastern State (Okla.))
- Charles Stevenson Hustle Award: Mike Malone (Wisconsin-Oshkosh)
- MVP: John Jamerson (Fairmont State (W.Va.))
- Top scorer: Ron Hayek (Wisconsin-Oshkosh) (116 points)

The 1968 NAIA men's basketball tournament was held in March at Municipal Auditorium in Kansas City, Missouri. The 31st annual NAIA basketball tournament featured 32 teams playing in a single-elimination format.

== Awards and honors ==
- Leading scorer: Ron Hayek, Wisconsin-Oshkosh; 5 games, 47 field goals, 22 free throws, 116 total points (23.2 average points per game)
- Leading rebounder: Wayne Denham, Fairmont State (W.Va.); 5 games, 68 total rebounds (13.6 average rebounds per game)
- Player of the Year: est. 1994

== 1968 NAIA bracket ==
First round	Second round
1	Guilford (NC)	78
-	Oshkosh State (Wis.)	80
-	Oshkosh State	82
-	Eastern Montana	75
-	Eastern Montana	83
16	Wayne State (Neb.)	70
TOP TIER
9	Union (Ky.)	69
-	Drury (Mo.)	75
-	Drury	85
8	Northeastern State	69
-	Athens (Al.)	72
8	Northeastern State (Okla.)	89
5	St. Cloud State (Minn.)	88
-	Millersville State (Pa.)	77
5	St. Cloud State	68
-	Dickinson State	70
-	Dickinson State (N.D.)	76
12	Washburn (Kan.)	71
TOP TIER
13	Albany State (Ga.)	68
-	New Haven (Conn.)	69
-	New Haven	72
-	Fairmont State	97
-	Fairmont State (W.Va.)	78
4	Oklahoma Christian	75
3	Central State (Ohio)	81
-	Millikin (Ill.)	64
3	Central State (Ohio)	60
14	Valdosta State	53
-	Westmar (Iowa)	57
14	Valdosta State (Ga.)	62
BOTTOM TIER
10	Central Washington State	95
-	Albuquerque (N.Mex.)	72
10	Central Washington State	85
7	Alcorn A&M	70
-	Henderson State (Ark.)	70
7	Alcorn A&M (Miss.)	79
6	Westminster (Pa.)	69
-	Pasadena (Calif.)	67
6	Westminster (Pa.)	70
11	Monmouth	69
-	Bishop (Tex.)	91
11	Monmouth (N.J.)	102
BOTTOM TIER
15	Hanover (Ind)	107
-	Southern Oregon State	59
15	Hanover	81
-	Eastern Michigan	94
-	Eastern Michigan	82
2	Stephen F. Austin (Tex.)	80

Elite Eight
-	Oshkosh State	57
-	Drury	55
-	Dickinson State	81
-	Fairmont State	86
3	Central State (Ohio)	66
10	Central Washington State	47
6	Westminster (Pa.)	92
-	Eastern Michigan	84

NAIA national semifinals
-	Oshkosh State	74
-	Fairmont State	76
3	Central State (Ohio)	72
6	Westminster (Pa.)	51

NAIA national championship
-	Fairmont State	48
3	Central State (Ohio)	51

=== Third-place game ===
The third-place game featured the losing teams from the national semifinalist to determine 3rd and 4th places in the tournament. This game was played until 1988.

NAIA Third-place game
-	Oshkosh State	102
6	Westminster (Pa.)	68

== See also ==
- 1968 NCAA University Division basketball tournament
- 1968 NCAA College Division basketball tournament
