= 1967–68 St. John's Redmen basketball team =

American college basketball season

1967–68 St. John's Redmen men's basketball

ECAC Holiday Festival, Second Place

1968 NCAA Tournament, First Round
- Conference: Independent
- Record: 19–8
- Head coach: Lou Carnesecca
- Assistant coach: John Kresse
- Captain: Rudy Bogad
- Home arena: Alumni Hall; Madison Square Garden

1967–68 NCAA University Division men's basketball independents standings
	Conf.				Overall
Team	W		L	PCT	W		L	PCT
No. 1 Houston		–		–	31	–	2	.939
No. 3 St. Bonaventure		–		–	23	–	2	.920
Army		–		–	20	–	5	.800
Marquette		–		–	23	–	6	.793
New Mexico State		–		–	23	–	6	.793
St. Francis (PA)		–		–	19	–	6	.760
Oklahoma City		–		–	20	–	7	.741
Duquesne		–		–	18	–	7	.720
Florida State		–		–	19	–	8	.704
Fordham		–		–	19	–	8	.704
St. John's		–		–	19	–	8	.704
Dayton		–		–	21	–	9	.700
Notre Dame		–		–	21	–	9	.700
Boston College		–		–	17	–	8	.680
Villanova		–		–	19	–	9	.679
Holy Cross		–		–	15	–	8	.652
Loyola Chicago		–		–	15	–	9	.625
Fairfield		–		–	16	–	10	.615
Texas Western		–		–	14	–	9	.609
Miami (FL)		–		–	17	–	11	.607
Rutgers		–		–	14	–	10	.583
Utah State		–		–	14	–	11	.560
VPI		–		–	14	–	11	.560
Southern Illinois		–		–	13	–	11	.542
DePaul		–		–	13	–	12	.520
Detroit		–		–	13	–	12	.520
Seattle		–		–	14	–	13	.519
Jacksonville		–		–	13	–	13	.500
Niagara		–		–	12	–	12	.500
Tulane		–		–	12	–	12	.500
Penn State		–		–	10	–	10	.500
Georgia Tech		–		–	12	–	13	.480
Georgetown		–		–	11	–	12	.478
West Texas State		–		–	10	–	11	.476
Colorado State		–		–	11	–	13	.458
Navy		–		–	9	–	11	.450
Butler		–		–	11	–	14	.440
Denver		–		–	11	–	14	.440
Loyola (LA)		–		–	11	–	14	.440
Providence		–		–	11	–	14	.440
Syracuse		–		–	11	–	14	.440
Boston University		–		–	10	–	14	.417
Northern Illinois		–		–	10	–	14	.417
Colgate		–		–	10	–	16	.385
Hardin–Simmons		–		–	10	–	16	.385
Xavier		–		–	10	–	16	.385
Air Force		–		–	9	–	15	.375
NYU		–		–	8	–	16	.333
Creighton		–		–	8	–	17	.320
Pittsburgh		–		–	7	–	15	.318
Canisius		–		–	7	–	17	.292
Portland		–		–	5	–	21	.192
Centenary		–		–	3	–	23	.115
Rankings from AP Poll

The 1967–68 St. John's Redmen basketball team represented St. John's University during the 1967–68 NCAA Division I men's basketball season. The team was coached by Lou Carnesecca in his third year at the school. St. John's home games were played at Alumni Hall and Madison Square Garden.

St. John's qualified for the NCAA tournament, where they lost to Davidson in the opening round of their East regional.

== Roster ==
#	Name	Height	Position	Class	Hometown	Previous School(s)
5	Carmine Calzonetti	6'1"	G	JR	Audubon, NJ	Gloucester Catholic HS
10	Jim Smyth	6'5"	G/F	SO	Brooklyn, NY	St. John's Prep
11	Kit Frey	6'9"	F/C	SR	Barryville, NY	Eldred Central HS
14	Rudy Bogad	6'7"	F	SR	New York, NY	Archbishop Molloy HS
15	Ralph Abraham	6'5"	F	SO	Brooklyn, NY	St. John's Prep
21	Richie Jackson	6'2"	G	JR	Lynbrook, NY	St. Agnes HS
24	Jack Bettridge	6'2"	G	SR	North Bergen, NJ	Power Memorial HS
30	John Warren	6'3"	G	JR	Far Rockaway, NY	Far Rockaway HS
44	Dan Cornelius	6'9"	F/C	JR	Wyandanch, NY	Wyandanch Memorial HS
55	Joe DePre	6'3"	G	SO	Westbury, NY	Westbury HS
	Mike Rowland	6'5"	G/F	SR	Ozone Park, NY	Bishop Loughlin HS
	James Plate	6'2"	G	JR	Patchogue, NY	Seton Hall HS

== Schedule and results ==
Date time, TV	Rank^{#}	Opponent^{#}	Result	Record	Site city, state
Regular Season
12/02/67*		Virginia	W 82-63	1-0	Alumni Hall; Queens, NY
12/06/67*		at West Virginia	L 63-65	1-1	Stansbury Hall; Morgantown, WV
12/09/67*		Southern California	W 63-58	2-1	Alumni Hall; Queens, NY
12/12/67*		at Rhode Island	W 64-63	3-1	Keaney Gymnasium; Kingston, RI
12/15/67*		Seton Hall	W 78-49	4-1	Alumni Hall; Queens, NY
12/17/67*		at No. 6 Boston College	W 91-90 ^{2OT}	5-1	Alumni Hall; Queens, NY
12/21/67*		St. Mary's	W 67-50	6-1	Alumni Hall; Queens, NY
12/26/67*		vs. Syracuse; ECAC Holiday Festival	W 60-55	7-1	Madison Square Garden; New York, NY
12/28/67*		vs. No. 10 Boston College; ECAC Holiday Festival	W 60-57	8-1	Madison Square Garden; New York, NY
12/30/67*		vs. Columbia; ECAC Holiday Festival	L 55-60	8-2	Madison Square Garden; New York, NY
01/04/68*		Syracuse	W 79-58	9-2	Alumni Hall; Queens, NY
01/06/68*		Davidson	L 54-70	9-3	Alumni Hall; Queens, NY
01/10/68*		at Georgetown	W 65-61 ^{OT}	10-3	McDonough Gymnasium; Washington, DC
01/13/68*		St. Francis (NY)	W 83-50	11-3	Alumni Hall; Queens, NY
01/17/68*		St. Joseph's	W 80-72	12-3	Alumni Hall; Queens, NY
01/27/68*		Villanova	L 57-62	12-4	Alumni Hall; Queens, NY
02/03/68*		at Niagara	W 74-73	13-4	NU Student Center; Lewiston, NY
02/07/68*		at Temple	L 55-62	13-5	The Palestra; Philadelphia, PA
02/10/68*		Army	L 54-55	13-6	Alumni Hall; Queens, NY
02/13/68*		at Notre Dame	W 83-81	14-6	Notre Dame Fieldhouse; Notre Dame, IN
02/17/68*		Fordham	W 75-71	15-6	Alumni Hall; Queens, NY
02/20/68*		at Massachusetts	W 55-53	16-6	Curry Hicks Cage; Amherst, MA
02/21/68*		at Providence	W 58-56	17-6	Alumni Hall; Providence, RI
02/24/68*		No. 10 Marquette	L 56-57	17-7	Alumni Hall; Queens, NY
02/27/68*		Holy Cross	W 83-67	18-7	Alumni Hall; Queens, NY
03/02/68*		vs. NYU	W 77-58	19-7	Madison Square Garden; New York, NY
NCAA Tournament
03/09/68*		vs. No. 10 Davidson; NCAA Regional Quarterfinal	L 70-79	19-8	Cole Field House; College Park, MD
*Non-conference game. ^{#}Rankings from AP Poll. (#) Tournament seedings in parentheses.

== Team players drafted into the NBA ==
Round	Pick	Player	NBA club
13	164	Rudy Bogad	Baltimore Bullets
