= Alumni Hall (Fairfield University) =

Arena in Fairfield, Connecticut

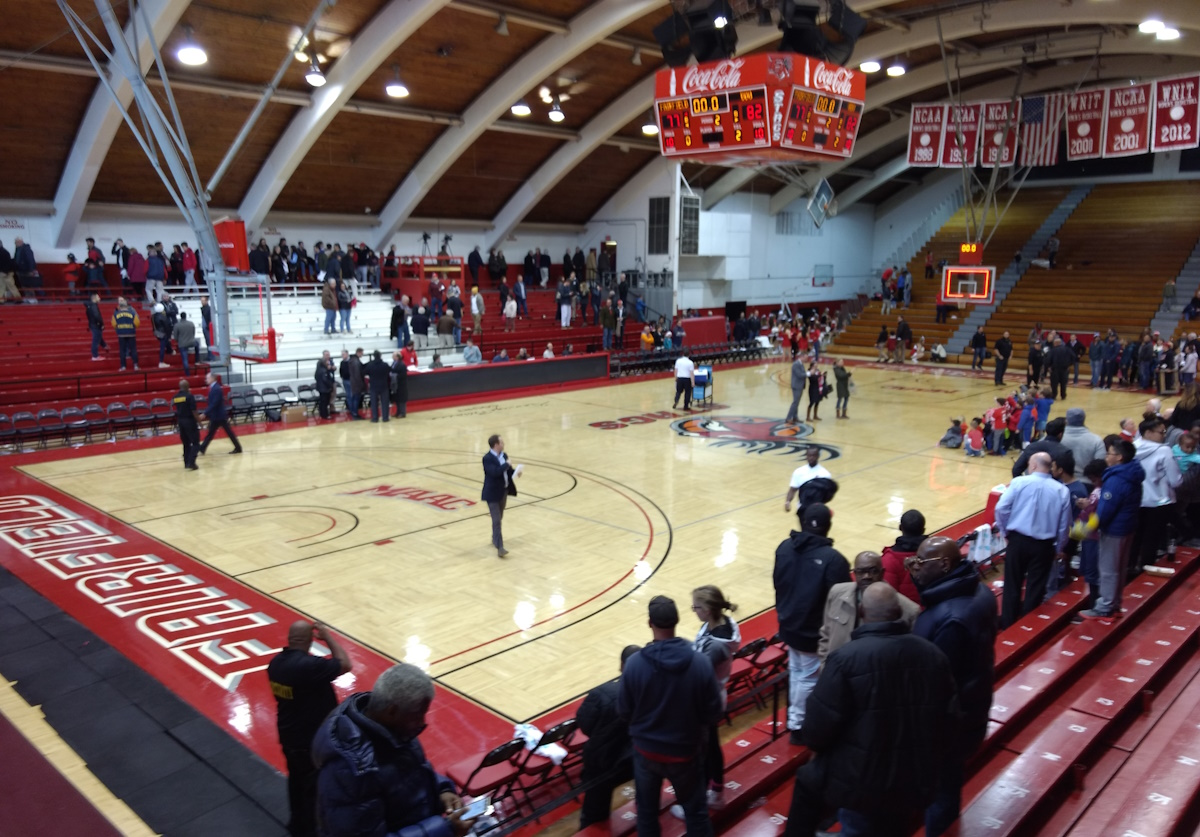
- Interactive map of Alumni Hall
- Location: Fairfield University; Fairfield, Connecticut
- Coordinates: 41.159854°N 73.256646°W
- Owner: Fairfield University
- Capacity: 2,479

Construction
- Groundbreaking: 1958
- Opened: 1959
- Closed: 2021
- Demolished: April 2021

Tenants
- Fairfield Stags (1959–2021); Fairfield Prep Jesuits (1959-2021)

Alumni Hall was a 2,479-seat multi-purpose arena on the campus of Fairfield University, located in Fairfield, Connecticut. It was home to the Fairfield Stags men's and women's basketball teams from its construction in 1959 until 2002, when the teams began playing home games at the Arena at Harbor Yard in Bridgeport, Connecticut. Sports Illustrated reported that Alumni Hall was home to the most vocal and loyal basketball fans in the Northeast.

Alumni Hall was home to the Fairfield Stags women's volleyball team and the Fairfield Prep Jesuits basketball teams, but it hosted two Stags men's and women's basketball games during the 2006–07 and 2007–08 seasons.

== History ==
The Hall, which opened on December 5, 1959, is one of the earliest prestressed concrete structures. Engineering magazines from the time noted that the eleven 160-foot pre-cast arches created a record-breaking span for structures in the United States.

Besides being an athletic venue, Alumni Hall has hosted many political and musical events and annually hosts the Fairfield University Baccalaureate Mass and the Fairfield Prep Commencement Ceremony. During the 1988 United States presidential election, Vice President George H. W. Bush visited Fairfield University days before being elected president. The Fairfield University Students Association hosts semi-annual concerts in the hall, and notable performers have included the Beach Boys in 1967, The Byrds in 1973, Ludacris in Spring 2008, and John Legend in December 2008.

On November 6, 2015, Fairfield University named Alumni Hall's court in honor of legendary basketball coach and the university's former director of athletics George Bisacca.

Alumni Hall was demolished in the spring of 2021 and replaced by Leo D. Mahoney Arena which opened on the same site in November 2022.
