= Edward Martin (basketball) =

American college basketball coach

Biographical details
- Born: June 18, 1925; Allentown, Pennsylvania, U.S.
- Died: February 25, 2002 (aged 76); Nashville, Tennessee, U.S.

Coaching career (HC unless noted)
- 1952–1955: Avery Normal Institute
- 1955–1968: South Carolina State
- 1968–1986: Tennessee State

Head coaching record
- Overall: 516–264 (college)

Edward Martin
- Pitcher

Negro league baseball debut
- 1951, for the Philadelphia Stars

Last appearance
- 1952, for the Philadelphia Stars

Teams
- Philadelphia Stars (1951–1952)

Edward Alfred Martin Sr. (June 18, 1925 – February 25, 2002) was an American college basketball coach and Negro league baseball player.

== Early years and baseball career ==
A native of Allentown, Pennsylvania, Martin graduated from William Allen High School, and served in the US Navy during World War II. Following his service, he attended North Carolina A&T State University, where he starred in baseball and basketball, graduating in 1951. Martin later earned a Master's Degree from Temple University. He went on to play for the Philadelphia Stars in 1951 and 1952.

== Coaching career ==
Following his baseball playing career, Martin took a high school basketball coaching position at Avery Normal Institute in Charleston, South Carolina, where he proceeded to win two state championships. From 1955 to 1968, he coached basketball at South Carolina State University, and from 1968 to 1986, he coached at Tennessee State University, amassing over 500 wins and numerous postseason appearances in over thirty years at the collegiate level.

== Later years ==
In his later years, Martin was assistant basketball coach at Vanderbilt University, and associate professor of human and organizational development at Vanderbilt's Peabody College. He also served as scout for the Minnesota Timberwolves. Martin was inducted into the Tennessee Sports Hall of Fame in 1994, and has also been honored by the athletic halls of fame at North Carolina A&T State University, South Carolina State University, Tennessee State University, and Vanderbilt University. He died in Nashville, Tennessee in 2002 at age 76.
