= 1967–68 Kansas Jayhawks men's basketball team =

American college basketball season

1967–68 Kansas Jayhawks men's basketball

NIT, Runner-Up
- Conference: Big Eight Conference
- Record: 22–8 (10–4 Big 8)
- Head coach: Ted Owens (4th season)
- Assistant coaches: Gale Catlett (1st season); Sam Miranda (2nd season)
- Captain: Rodger Bohnenstiehl
- Home arena: Allen Fieldhouse

1967–68 Big Eight Conference men's basketball standings
	Conf.				Overall
Team	W		L	PCT	W		L	PCT
Kansas State	11	–	3	.786	19	–	9	.679
Kansas	10	–	4	.714	22	–	8	.733
Nebraska	8	–	6	.571	15	–	10	.600
Oklahoma	8	–	6	.571	13	–	13	.500
Iowa State	8	–	6	.571	12	–	13	.480
Missouri	5	–	9	.357	10	–	16	.385
Oklahoma State	3	–	11	.214	10	–	16	.385
Colorado	3	–	11	.214	9	–	16	.360
Rankings from AP Poll

The 1967–68 Kansas Jayhawks men's basketball team represented the University of Kansas during the 1967–68 college men's basketball season.

== Roster ==
- Jo Jo White
- Rodger Bohnenstiehl
- Dave Nash
- Phil Harmon
- Bruce Sloan
- Rich Bradshaw
- Greg Douglas
- Vernon Vanoy
- Howard Arndt
- Chester Lawrence
- Rich Thomas

== Schedule ==
Date time, TV	Rank^{#}	Opponent^{#}	Result	Record	Site city, state
December 2*	No. 5	Utah State	W 84–55	1-0	Allen Fieldhouse; Lawrence, KS
December 6*	No. 4	No. 3 Louisville	L 51–57	1-1	Allen Fieldhouse; Lawrence, KS
December 9*	No. 4	at Loyola (IL)	L 73–83	1-2	Alumni Gym; Chicago, IL
December 15*		Cincinnati	W 67–61	2-2	Allen Fieldhouse; Lawrence, KS
December 16*		vs. Texas A&M	W 78–52	3-2	Ahearn Field House; Manhattan, KS
December 18*		Stanford	W 72–54	4-2	Allen Fieldhouse; Lawrence, KS
December 21*		Louisville	W 84–76	5-2	Freedom Hall; Lexington, KY
December 23		at Saint Louis	W 68–64	6-2	Kiel Auditorium; St. Louis, MO
December 28		vs. Oklahoma State	L 67–79	6-3	Municipal Auditorium; Kansas City, MO
December 29		vs. Nebraska	W 73–57	7-3	Municipal Auditorium; Kansas City, MO
December 30		vs. Missouri; Border War	W 63–47	8-3	Municipal Auditorium; Kansas City, MO
January 6		Colorado	W 66–50	9-3 (1-0)	Allen Fieldhouse; Lawrence, KS
January 8		Iowa State	W 68–67	10-3 (2-0)	Allen Fieldhouse; Lawrence, KS
January 13*		Portland	W 80–37	11-3	Allen Fieldhouse; Lawrence, KS
January 15		Missouri; Border War	L 66–67	11-4 (2-1)	Allen Fieldhouse; Lawrence, KS
January 20		at Kansas State	L 56–71	11-5 (2-2)	Ahearn Field House; Manhattan, KS
February 3		Oklahoma	W 72–70	12-5 (3-2)	Allen Fieldhouse; Lawrence, KS
February 5		Oklahoma State	W 52–50	13-5 (4-2)	Allen Fieldhouse; Lawrence, KS
February 10		at Colorado	W 75–72	14-5 (5-2)	Balch Fieldhouse; Boulder, CO
February 17		Nebraska	W 71–60	15-5 (6-2)	Allen Fieldhouse; Lawrence, KS
February 20		at Missouri; Border War	W 74–65	16-5 (7-2)	Brewer Fieldhouse; Columbia, MO
February 24		Kansas State; Sunflower Showdown	L 61–64	16-6 (7-3)	Allen Fieldhouse; Lawrence, KS
February 27		at Nebraska	L 69–76	16-7 (7-4)	Nebraska Coliseum; Lincoln, NE
March 2		at Oklahoma State	W 70–58	17-7 (8-4)	Gallagher-Iba Arena; Stillwater, OK
March 4		at Oklahoma	W 85–80 ^{OT}	18-7 (9-4)	McCasland Field House; Norman, OK
March 9		Iowa State	W 91–58	19-7 (10-4)	Allen Fieldhouse; Lawrence, KS
March 15		vs. Temple; NIT First Round	W 82–76	20-7	Madison Square Garden (III); New York, NY
March 18		vs. Villanova; NIT Quarterfinals	W 55–49	21-7	Madison Square Garden (III); New York, NY
March 21		vs. Saint Peter's; NIT Semifinals	W 58–46	22-7	Madison Square Garden (III); New York, NY
March 23		vs. Dayton; NIT Finals	L 48–61	22-8	Madison Square Garden (III); New York, NY
*Non-conference game. ^{#}Rankings from AP Poll. (#) Tournament seedings in parentheses.
