= John Powers (basketball) =

American college basketball coach

John "Jack" Powers
Biographical details
- Born: October 22, 1935
- Died: February 27, 2025 (aged 89)

Playing career
- 1955–1958: Manhattan

Coaching career (HC unless noted)
- 1960–1967: Mamaroneck HS (NY)
- 1967–1968: Manhattan (assistant)
- 1968–1978: Manhattan

Administrative career (AD unless noted)
- 1979–1988: Manhattan
- 1988–2005: NIT (executive director)

Head coaching record
- Overall: 142–114 (.555)

John "Jack" Powers (October 22, 1935 – February 27, 2025) was an American Hall of Fame basketball player, coach and executive who played for, coached, and was athletic director at Manhattan College. He was also executive director of the National Invitation Tournament and the Eastern Collegiate Athletic Conference - The ECAC. He was named to the NYC Basketball Hall of Fame as part of its Class of 2024.

== Playing career ==
Powers played for the Manhattan Jaspers men's basketball team from 1955 to 1958. Powers also attended Manhattan's prep school, Manhattan Prep. He averaged 15.4 points per game and 7.5 rebounds per game during his career. He scored 26 points in Manhattan's 84–75 loss to Uconn in the 1956 NCAA basketball tournament. Manhattan returned to the NCAA tournament in 1958, and Powers scored 29 points in the Jaspers' 89–84 victory over Jerry West and the West Virginia Mountaineers. Powers concluded his collegiate career at Manhattan with 1,139 points over 3 seasons.

== Coaching career ==
Powers coached football and basketball at Mamaroneck High School before returning to his alma mater in 1967 as an assistant basketball coach. The following year, he replaced the retiring Ken Norton as head coach. In his ten seasons as head coach, Powers compiled a 142–114 record.

== Administration ==
Powers left coaching in 1978 to accept an administrative position at the school. The following year, he became Manhattan's athletic director. He was the executive director of the National Invitation Tournament from 1988 until the tournament was taken over by the National Collegiate Athletic Association in 2005.

== Honors ==
Powers has been inducted into the Manhattan College, Mamaroneck High School, Catholic High School Athletic Association, and Brooklyn Old Timers halls of fame. In 2012, Powers was honored by the Naismith Memorial Basketball Hall of Fame in Massachusetts at their first annual MAAC Honor Roll dinner. In 2015, he became the first Manhattan College athlete to have their uniform number retired. On September 19, 2024, at the Barclays Center in Brooklyn, Powers was inducted into the NYC Basketball Hall of Fame as part of the incoming Class of 2024.

== Personal life ==
Powers was a longtime resident of both Eastchester, NY and Montauk, NY. He died on February 27, 2025 at 89 years old.
