= 1967–68 Houston Cougars men's basketball team =

American college basketball season

1967–68 Houston Cougars men's basketball
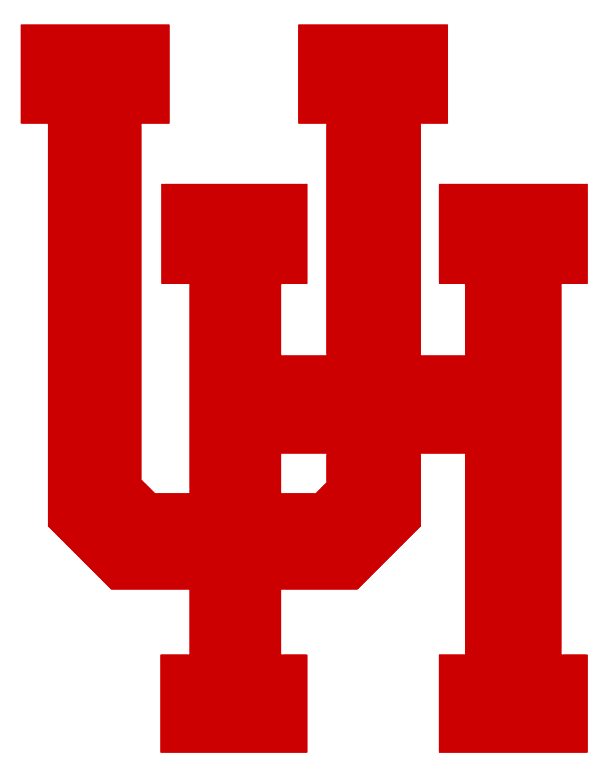

NCAA regular season champions

NCAA tournament, Final Four
- Conference: Independent

Ranking
- Coaches: No. 1
- AP: No. 1
- Record: 31–2
- Head coach: Guy Lewis (12th season)
- Assistant coaches: Harvey Pate; Don Schverak
- Home arena: Delmar Fieldhouse

1967–68 NCAA University Division men's basketball independents standings
	Conf.				Overall
Team	W		L	PCT	W		L	PCT
No. 1 Houston		–		–	31	–	2	.939
No. 3 St. Bonaventure		–		–	23	–	2	.920
Army		–		–	20	–	5	.800
Marquette		–		–	23	–	6	.793
New Mexico State		–		–	23	–	6	.793
St. Francis (PA)		–		–	19	–	6	.760
Oklahoma City		–		–	20	–	7	.741
Duquesne		–		–	18	–	7	.720
Florida State		–		–	19	–	8	.704
Fordham		–		–	19	–	8	.704
St. John's		–		–	19	–	8	.704
Dayton		–		–	21	–	9	.700
Notre Dame		–		–	21	–	9	.700
Boston College		–		–	17	–	8	.680
Villanova		–		–	19	–	9	.679
Holy Cross		–		–	15	–	8	.652
Loyola Chicago		–		–	15	–	9	.625
Fairfield		–		–	16	–	10	.615
Texas Western		–		–	14	–	9	.609
Miami (FL)		–		–	17	–	11	.607
Rutgers		–		–	14	–	10	.583
Utah State		–		–	14	–	11	.560
VPI		–		–	14	–	11	.560
Southern Illinois		–		–	13	–	11	.542
DePaul		–		–	13	–	12	.520
Detroit		–		–	13	–	12	.520
Seattle		–		–	14	–	13	.519
Jacksonville		–		–	13	–	13	.500
Niagara		–		–	12	–	12	.500
Tulane		–		–	12	–	12	.500
Penn State		–		–	10	–	10	.500
Georgia Tech		–		–	12	–	13	.480
Georgetown		–		–	11	–	12	.478
West Texas State		–		–	10	–	11	.476
Colorado State		–		–	11	–	13	.458
Navy		–		–	9	–	11	.450
Butler		–		–	11	–	14	.440
Denver		–		–	11	–	14	.440
Loyola (LA)		–		–	11	–	14	.440
Providence		–		–	11	–	14	.440
Syracuse		–		–	11	–	14	.440
Boston University		–		–	10	–	14	.417
Northern Illinois		–		–	10	–	14	.417
Colgate		–		–	10	–	16	.385
Hardin–Simmons		–		–	10	–	16	.385
Xavier		–		–	10	–	16	.385
Air Force		–		–	9	–	15	.375
NYU		–		–	8	–	16	.333
Creighton		–		–	8	–	17	.320
Pittsburgh		–		–	7	–	15	.318
Canisius		–		–	7	–	17	.292
Portland		–		–	5	–	21	.192
Centenary		–		–	3	–	23	.115
Rankings from AP Poll

The 1967–68 Houston Cougars men's basketball team represented the University of Houston in the 1967–68 NCAA University Division men's basketball season. The team played its home games at Delmar Fieldhouse in Houston for the second consecutive season. This season marked the team's ninth year as an independent member of the NCAA's University Division. Houston was led by twelfth-year head coach Guy Lewis.

During the regular season, the Elvin Hayes-fronted Cougars defeated the Lew Alcindor-led UCLA Bruins on January 20 in what was known as the Game of the Century. Houston attained a perfect 28–0 record for regular season, and finished with a 31–2 overall record, the first thirty-win season in program history. The Cougars finished first in both major polls, were invited to the NCAA tournament, and finished as a semifinalist. It was Houston's second consecutive Final Four appearance.

Following the season, Elvin Hayes was drafted into the National Basketball Association by the San Diego Rockets as the first overall draft pick in the 1968 NBA draft. Don Chaney was also taken as the twelfth overall draft pick by the Boston Celtics.

== Roster ==
1967–68 Houston Cougars men's basketball team
Players
Coaches

Pos.	#	Name	Height	Weight	Year	Hometown
G	10	Vernon Lewis	5 ft 11 in (1.8 m)	170 lb (77 kg)	Sr	Houston, Texas
G	12	Larry Anderson	6 ft 1 in (1.85 m)	170 lb (77 kg)	So	Drumright, Oklahoma
C	14	Ken Spain	6 ft 9 in (2.06 m)	230 lb (104 kg)	Jr	Houston, Texas
G	20	Tom Gribben	6 ft 2 in (1.88 m)	180 lb (82 kg)	So	Berwyn, Illinois
G	22	Niemer Hamood	6 ft 0 in (1.83 m)	170 lb (77 kg)	Jr	Dearborn, Michigan
G	24	Don Chaney	6 ft 5 in (1.96 m)	210 lb (95 kg)	Sr	Baton Rouge, Louisiana
F	30	Larry Cooper	6 ft 6 in (1.98 m)	210 lb (95 kg)	So	Houston, Texas
G	32	Billy Bane	6 ft 2 in (1.88 m)	188 lb (85 kg)	Jr	Charlotte, North Carolina
C	34	Mars Evans	6 ft 10 in (2.08 m)	250 lb (113 kg)	So	New York City, New York
F	40	Theodis Lee	6 ft 7 in (2.01 m)	210 lb (95 kg)	Jr	Monroe, Louisiana
G	42	George Reynolds	6 ft 4 in (1.93 m)	205 lb (93 kg)	Jr	Newark, New Jersey
F	44	Elvin Hayes	6 ft 8 in (2.03 m)	235 lb (107 kg)	Sr	Rayville, Louisiana
G	50	Kent Taylor	6 ft 2 in (1.88 m)	180 lb (82 kg)	So	Houston, Texas
G	52	Bobby Van Landingham	6 ft 2 in (1.88 m)	170 lb (77 kg)	Jr	La Marque, Texas
F	54	Carlos Bell	6 ft 5 in (1.96 m)	215 lb (98 kg)	Jr	Clinton, Oklahoma
F	54	Melvin Bell	6 ft 7 in (2.01 m)	230 lb (104 kg)	Jr	Clinton, Oklahoma

Head coach

- Guy Lewis (Houston)

Assistant coach(es)

- Harvey Pate (Oklahoma State)
- Don Schverak (Houston)

Legend

- (C) Team captain
- (S) Suspended
- (I) Ineligible
- (W) Walk-on
- Injured
- Current redshirt

Roster
Last update: 2010-07-29

== Schedule ==
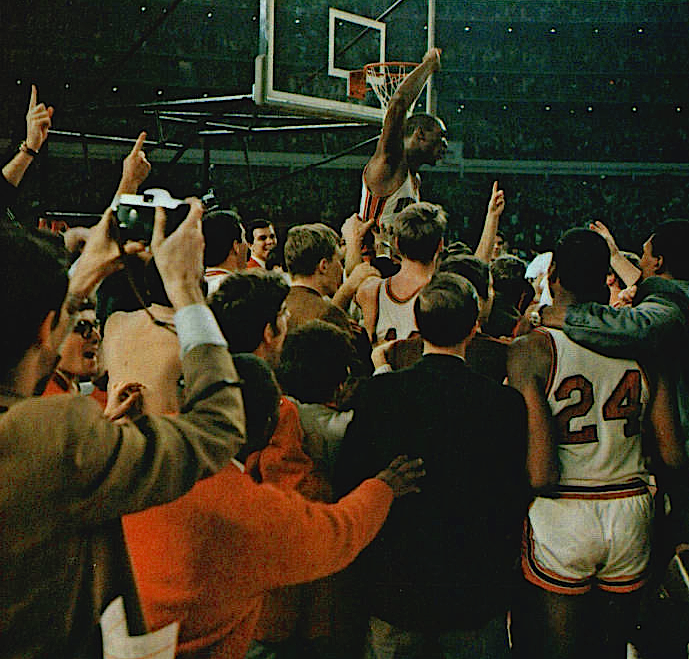
Houston's Elvin Hayes is carried in celebration after the victory over UCLA in the 1968 Game of the Century.

Houston's regular season included the notable Game of Century against #1 UCLA. With an attendance of 52,693, the game had the highest attendance of any basketball game at any level at the time. It was also the first national broadcast of an NCAA basketball game in prime-time.

Date time, TV	Rank^{#}	Opponent^{#}	Result	Record	Site city, state
Regular season
12/2/1967	No. 2	Sacramento State	W 110–79	1–0	Delmar Fieldhouse; Houston, Texas
12/4/1967	No. 2	Abilene Christian	W 90–75	2–0	Delmar Fieldhouse; Houston, Texas
12/7/1967	No. 2	North Dakota State	W 121–88	3–0	Delmar Fieldhouse; Houston, Texas
12/9/1967	No. 2	at Illinois	W 54–46	4–0	Assembly Hall; Champaign, Illinois
12/13/1967	No. 2	George Washington; Bluebonnet Classic	W 86–61	5–0	Delmar Fieldhouse; Houston, Texas
12/14/1967	No. 2	Montana State; Bluebonnet Classic	W 113–67	6–0	Delmar Fieldhouse; Houston, Texas
12/16/1967	No. 2	BYU	W 102–69	7–0	Delmar Fieldhouse; Houston, Texas
12/18/1967	No. 2	Minnesota	W 103–65	8–0	Delmar Fieldhouse; Houston, Texas
12/22/1967	No. 2	at Arizona	W 81–76	9–0	Bear Down Gym; Tucson, Arizona
12/23/1967	No. 2	at Nevada Southern	W 94–85	10–0	Las Vegas Convention Center; Las Vegas, Nevada
12/28/1967	No. 2	vs. Bradley; Rainbow Classic	W 69–52	11–0	Honolulu International Center; Honolulu, Hawaii
12/29/1967	No. 2	vs. Marquette; Rainbow Classic	W 77–65	12–0	Honolulu International Center; Honolulu, Hawaii
12/30/1967	No. 2	vs. North Texas State; Rainbow Classic	W 45–43	13–0	Honolulu International Center; Honolulu, Hawaii
1/2/1968	No. 2	Michigan	W 91–65	14–0	Delmar Fieldhouse; Houston, Texas
1/6/1968	No. 2	Centenary (LA)	W 118–81	15–0	Delmar Fieldhouse; Houston, Texas
1/13/1968	No. 2	West Texas State	W 98–53	16–0	Delmar Fieldhouse; Houston, Texas
1/20/1968; TVS	No. 2	vs. No. 1 UCLA; Game of the Century	W 71–69	17–0	Houston Astrodome (52,693); Houston, Texas
1/27/1968	No. 1	Lamar Tech	W 112–79	18–0	Delmar Fieldhouse; Houston, Texas
1/29/1968	No. 1	Fairfield	W 108–76	19–0	Delmar Fieldhouse; Houston, Houston
2/1/1968	No. 1	vs. Marshall	W 102–93	20–0	Madison Square Garden; New York City, New York
2/10/1968	No. 1	at Centenary (LA)	W 107–56	21–0	Haynes Gymnasium; Shreveport, Louisiana
2/15/1968	No. 1	Miami (FL)	W 106–64	22–0	Delmar Fieldhouse; Houston, Texas
2/17/1968	No. 1	Air Force	W 106–82	23–0	Delmar Fieldhouse; Houston, Texas
2/22/1968	No. 1	Texas–Arlington	W 130–75	24–0	Delmar Fieldhouse; Houston, Texas
2/24/1968	No. 1	Valparaiso	W 158–81	25–0	Delmar Fieldhouse; Houston, Texas
2/26/1968	No. 1	at Hardin–Simmons	W 105–82	26–0	Rose Fieldhouse; Abilene, Texas
3/2/1968	No. 1	Virginia Tech	W 120–79	27–0	Delmar Fieldhouse; Houston, Texas
3/4/1968	No. 1	at West Texas State	W 107–76	28–0	West Texas State Fieldhouse; Canyon, Texas
NCAA tournament
3/9/1968	No. 1	vs. Loyola (IL); Regional quarterfinals – First round	W 94–76	29–0	Nielsen Fieldhouse; Salt Lake City, Utah
3/15/1968	No. 1	vs. No. 9 Louisville; Regional semifinals – Sweet Sixteen	W 91–75	30–0	WSU Field House; Wichita, Kansas
3/16/1968	No. 1	vs. TCU; Regional finals – Elite Eight	W 103–68	31–0	WSU Field House; Wichita, Kansas
3/22/1968; SNI	No. 1	vs. No. 2 UCLA; Final Four	L 69–101	31–1	Los Angeles Memorial Sports Arena; Los Angeles, California
3/23/1968	No. 1	vs. Ohio State; Third-place game	L 85–89	31–2	Los Angeles Memorial Sports Arena; Los Angeles, California
*Non-conference game. ^{#}Rankings from AP Poll. (#) Tournament seedings in parentheses.

== Rankings ==
Ranking movements Legend: ██ Increase in ranking ██ Decrease in ranking
	Week															
Poll	Pre	1	2	3	4	5	6	7	8	9	10	11	12	13	14	Final
AP	2	2	2	2	2	2	2	2	1	1	1	1	1	1	1	1
Coaches	2	2	2	2	2	2	2	2	1	1	1	1	1	1	1	1

== Team players drafted into the NBA ==
Round	Pick	Player	NBA club
Elvin Hayes	1	1	San Diego Rockets
Don Chaney	1	12	Boston Celtics
