= George Bisacca =

American basketball coach

Coaching career (HC unless noted)
- 1958–1968: Fairfield

Head coaching record
- Overall: 151-87

George Bisacca was the fourth head coach of the Fairfield Stags men's basketball team.

== Coaching career ==
Bisacca was the head coach of the Fairfield Stags men's basketball team coach for 11 seasons from 1958 to 1968 where he compiled a 151–87 record.

During his tenure Bisacca led Fairfield to the Tri-State League championship and three straight NCAA College Division II Tournaments from 1960 through 1962. He then elevated the program to NCAA DI status.

In 1967–68, his 10th and final season as a college coach, his Stags faced the nation's No. 1 team, Houston (led by future Hall-of-Famer Elvin Hayes), defeated Niagara (led by another future Hall-of Famer Calvin Murphy) before a capacity crowd in the old New Haven Arena and lost to undefeated St. Bonaventure (led by yet another future Hall-of-Famer Bob Lanier) in overtime.
