= 1968 NCAA University Division basketball tournament =

Edition of USA college basketball tournament

- Season: 1967–68
- Teams: 23
- Finals site: Los Angeles Memorial Sports Arena, Los Angeles, California
- Champions: UCLA Bruins (4th title, 4th title game, 5th Final Four)
- Runner-up: North Carolina Tar Heels (3rd title game, 4th Final Four)
- Semifinalists: Houston Cougars (2nd Final Four); Ohio State Buckeyes (8th Final Four)
- Winning coach: John Wooden (4th title)
- MOP: Lew Alcindor (UCLA)
- Attendance: 160,888
- Top scorer: Elvin Hayes (Houston) (167 points)

The 1968 NCAA University Division basketball tournament involved 23 schools playing in single-elimination play to determine the national champion of men's NCAA Division I college basketball. The 30th annual edition of the tournament began on March 9, 1968, and ended with the championship game on March 23, at the Memorial Sports Arena in Los Angeles, California. A total of 27 games were played, including a third-place game in each region and a national third-place game.

UCLA, coached by John Wooden, won the national title with a 78–55 victory in the final game over North Carolina, coached by Dean Smith. Lew Alcindor of UCLA was named the tournament's Most Outstanding Player for the second of three consecutive years. This UCLA team, led by All-Americans Lew Alcindor and Lucius Allen, was named the greatest college basketball team of all time by The Sporting News.

The NCAA semi-final match between the Houston Cougars and UCLA Bruins was a re-match of the college basketball Game of the Century held in January at the Astrodome, in the Cougars' home city. The match was historic, the first nationally syndicated college basketball game and the first to play in a domed stadium before more than 52,000 fans. It was UCLA's only loss in two years, a two-pointer, to the then-#2 Houston, but with UCLA's dominating center Alcindor playing with an eye injury that limited his effectiveness after being hospitalized the week before. The loss broke a 47-game winning streak for UCLA. In the March NCAA Tournament Final 4, the Bruins at full strength avenged that loss with a 101–69 drubbing of that same Houston team, now ranked #1, in UCLA's home city at the Memorial Sports Arena. UCLA limited Houston's Elvin Hayes, who was averaging 37.7 points per game but was held to only 10. Bruins coach John Wooden credited his assistant, Jerry Norman, for devising the diamond-and-one defense that contained Hayes.

== Locations ==
| Round | Region | Site | Venue | Host |
|---|---|---|---|---|
| First Round | East | College Park, Maryland | Cole Field House | Maryland |
| First Round | East | Kingston, Rhode Island | Keaney Gymnasium | Rhode Island |
| First Round | Mideast | Kent, Ohio | Memorial Gymnasium | Kent State |
| First Round | Midwest & West | Salt Lake City, Utah | Nielsen Fieldhouse | Utah |
| Regionals | East | Raleigh, North Carolina | Reynolds Coliseum | North Carolina State |
| Regionals | Mideast | Lexington, Kentucky | Memorial Coliseum | Kentucky |
| Regionals | Midwest | Wichita, Kansas | WSU Field House | Wichita State |
| Regionals | West | Albuquerque, New Mexico | University Arena ("The Pit") | New Mexico |
| Final Four | | Los Angeles, California | Los Angeles Memorial Sports Arena | Southern California |

== Teams ==
| Region | Team | Coach | Conference | Finished | Final Opponent | Score |
East
| East | Boston College | Bob Cousy | Independent | First round | St. Bonaventure | L 102–93 |
| East | Columbia | John Rohan | Ivy League | Regional third place | St. Bonaventure | W 95–75 |
| East | Davidson | Lefty Driesell | Southern | Regional Runner-up | North Carolina | L 70–66 |
| East | La Salle | Jim Harding | Middle Atlantic | First round | Columbia | L 83–69 |
| East | North Carolina | Dean Smith | Atlantic Coast | Runner Up | UCLA | L 78–55 |
| East | St. Bonaventure | Larry Weise | Independent | Regional Fourth Place | Columbia | L 95–75 |
| East | St. John's | Lou Carnesecca | Independent | First round | Davidson | L 79–70 |
Mideast
| Mideast | Bowling Green | Bill Fitch | Mid-American | First round | Marquette | L 72–71 |
| Mideast | East Tennessee State | J. Madison Brooks | Ohio Valley | Regional Fourth Place | Marquette | L 69–57 |
| Mideast | Florida State | Hugh Durham | Independent | First round | East Tennessee State | L 79–69 |
| Mideast | Kentucky | Adolph Rupp | Southeastern | Regional Runner-up | Ohio State | L 82–81 |
| Mideast | Marquette | Al McGuire | Independent | Regional third place | East Tennessee State | W 69–57 |
| Mideast | Ohio State | Fred Taylor | Big Ten | Third Place | Houston | W 89–85 |
Midwest
| Midwest | Houston | Guy Lewis | Independent | Fourth Place | Ohio State | L 89–85 |
| Midwest | Kansas State | Tex Winter | Big Eight | Regional Fourth Place | Louisville | L 93–63 |
| Midwest | Louisville | John Dromo | Missouri Valley | Regional third place | Kansas State | W 93–63 |
| Midwest | Loyola–Chicago | George Ireland | Independent | First round | Houston | L 94–76 |
| Midwest | TCU | Johnny Swaim | Southwest | Regional Runner-up | Houston | L 103–68 |
West
| West | New Mexico | Bob King | Western Athletic | Regional Fourth Place | New Mexico State | L 62–58 |
| West | New Mexico State | Lou Henson | Independent | Regional third place | New Mexico | W 62–58 |
| West | Santa Clara | Dick Garibaldi | West Coast Athletic | Regional Runner-up | UCLA | L 87–66 |
| West | UCLA | John Wooden | AAWU | Champion | North Carolina | W 78–55 |
| West | Weber State | Dick Motta | Big Sky | First round | New Mexico State | L 68–57 |

== Bracket ==
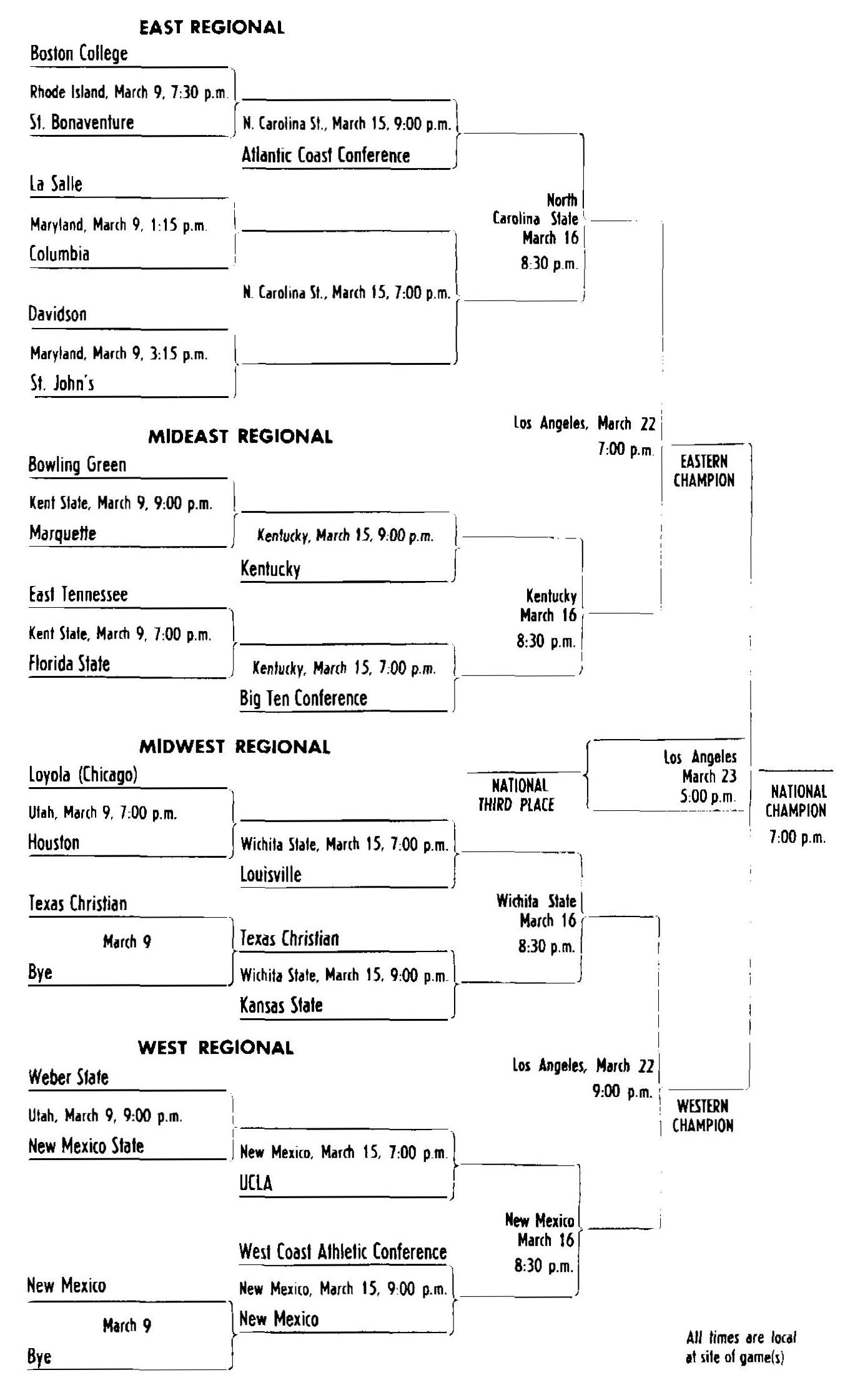
The 1968 tournament bracket as depicted in NCAA's monthly press newsletter

* – Denotes overtime period

=== East region ===
Quarterfinals
St. Bonaventure | 102
Boston College | 93
Davidson | 79
St. John's | 70
Columbia | 83
La Salle | 69

Semifinals
North Carolina | 91
St. Bonaventure | 72
Davidson | 61
Columbia | 59*

Finals
North Carolina | 70
Davidson | 66

=== Mideast region ===
Quarterfinals
East Tennessee State | 79
Florida State | 69
Marquette | 72
Bowling Green | 71

Semifinals
Ohio State | 79
East Tennessee State | 72
Kentucky | 107
Marquette | 89

Finals
Ohio State | 82
Kentucky | 81

=== Midwest region ===
Quarterfinals
Houston | 94
Loyola–Chicago | 76

Semifinals
TCU | 77
Kansas State | 72
Louisville | 75
Houston | 91

Finals
TCU | 68
Houston | 103

=== West region ===
Quarterfinals
New Mexico State | 68
Weber State | 57

Semifinals
Santa Clara | 86
New Mexico | 73
UCLA | 58
New Mexico State | 49

Finals
Santa Clara | 66
UCLA | 87

=== Final Four ===
National Semifinals
E | North Carolina | 80
ME | Ohio State | 66
MW | Houston | 69
W | UCLA | 101

National Championship Game
E | North Carolina | 55
W | UCLA | 78

=== National third-place game ===
| National third-place game |
| ME | Ohio State | 89 |
| MW | Houston | 85 |

=== Regional third-place games ===
| East Regional third place |
| Columbia | 95 |
| St. Bonaventure | 75 |

| Mideast Regional third place |
| Marquette | 69 |
| East Tennessee State | 57 |

| Midwest Regional third place |
| Louisville | 93 |
| Kansas State | 63 |

| West Regional third place |
| New Mexico State | 62 |
| New Mexico | 58 |

== See also ==
- 1968 NCAA College Division basketball tournament
- 1968 National Invitation Tournament
- 1968 NAIA basketball tournament

== Notes ==
- This would be the last year of the 23 team field, as the field would stay at 25 teams for the next six seasons until the expansion of the field to 32 teams in the 1975 tournament.
- Four teams - East Tennessee State, Florida State, New Mexico and Weber State - made their tournament debuts. Weber State would return to the tournament for five consecutive seasons; Florida State and New Mexico would not return until 1972 and 1974, respectively; and East Tennessee State would not return for 21 seasons, until 1989.
- Two teams - Bowling Green and Columbia - made their most recent tournament appearances in this tournament. They are tied for the third longest active drought behind Tennessee Tech (1963) and Dartmouth (1959), and are currently tied for the fourth longest drought all-time, after Tennessee Tech, Dartmouth and Harvard (1946–2012, 66 years).
