= Clemson Tigers men's basketball, 1960–1969 =

American collegiate basketball team seasons

The Clemson Tigers men's basketball teams of 1960–1969 represented Clemson University in NCAA college basketball competition.

== 1959–60 ==
1959–60 Clemson Tigers men's basketball
- Conference: Atlantic Coast Conference
- Record: 10–16 (4–10 ACC)
- Head coach: Press Maravich
- Home arena: Clemson Field House

1959–60 ACC men's basketball standings
	Conf.				Overall
Team	W		L	PCT	W		L	PCT
North Carolina	12	–	2	.857	18	–	6	.750
No. 19 Wake Forest	12	–	2	.857	21	–	7	.750
Maryland	9	–	5	.643	15	–	8	.652
No. 18 Duke †	7	–	7	.500	17	–	11	.607
South Carolina	6	–	8	.429	10	–	16	.385
NC State	5	–	9	.357	11	–	15	.423
Clemson	4	–	10	.286	10	–	16	.385
Virginia	1	–	13	.071	6	–	18	.250
† 1960 ACC tournament winner Rankings from AP Poll

Date	Opponent	Site	Result
December 1*	Erskine	Clemson Field House • Clemson, South Carolina	W 71–63
December 5	at Duke	Duke Indoor Stadium • Durham, North Carolina	L 59–68
December 7*	at Tennessee	Alumni Memorial Gym • Knoxville, Tennessee	L 62–80
December 12*	at Villanova	Villanova Field House • Villanova, Pennsylvania	L 64–77
December 14*	Davidson	Clemson Field House • Clemson, South Carolina	W 74–70
December 18*	Florida State	Clemson Field House • Clemson, South Carolina	W 68–64
December 28*	vs. Oklahoma City	Oklahoma City (All-College Tournament Quarterfinal)	L 54–84
December 29*	vs. Tulsa	Oklahoma City (All-College Tournament Consolation)	L 52–70
December 30*	vs. Cornell	Oklahoma City (All-College Tournament Consolation)	W 59–58
January 2*	at Davidson	Charlotte Coliseum • Charlotte, North Carolina	W 66–60 (OT)
January 4	at #12 Wake Forest	Winston–Salem Memorial Coliseum • Winston-Salem, North Carolina	L 62–77
January 7*	Furman	Clemson Field House • Clemson, South Carolina	L 69–80
January 12	Duke	Clemson Field House • Clemson, South Carolina	L 41–50
January 14*	at Furman	Alley Gymnasium • Greenville, South Carolina	W 87–85 (2OT)
January 16	South Carolina	Clemson Field House • Clemson, South Carolina	W 74–69
January 19	Wake Forest	Clemson Field House • Clemson, South Carolina	L 64–83
January 30	at NC State	Reynolds Coliseum • Raleigh, North Carolina	L 69–90
February 6	Virginia	Clemson Field House • Clemson, South Carolina	W 74–56
February 8	#11 North Carolina	Clemson Field House • Clemson, South Carolina	L 54–73
February 13	at Virginia	Memorial Gymnasium • Charlottesville, Virginia	W 59–58
February 15	at Maryland	Cole Field House • College Park, Maryland	L 55–70
February 19	vs. #19 North Carolina	Charlotte Coliseum • Charlotte, North Carolina (North–South Doubleheader)	L 80–85
February 20	vs. NC State	Charlotte Coliseum • Charlotte, North Carolina (North–South Doubleheader)	W 65–62
February 24	at South Carolina	Carolina Fieldhouse • Columbia, South Carolina	L 65–66
February 26	Maryland	Clemson Field House • Clemson, South Carolina	L 59–66
March 3*	vs. #18 Wake Forest	Reynolds Coliseum • Raleigh, North Carolina (ACC Tournament Quarterfinal)	L 59–74
*Non-Conference Game. #Rankings from AP Poll released prior to game.

== 1960–61 ==
1960–61 Clemson Tigers men's basketball
- Conference: Atlantic Coast Conference
- Record: 10–16 (5–9 ACC)
- Head coach: Press Maravich
- Home arena: Clemson Field House

1960–61 ACC men's basketball standings
	Conf.				Overall
Team	W		L	PCT	W		L	PCT
No. 5 North Carolina	12	–	2	.857	19	–	4	.826
Wake Forest †	11	–	3	.786	19	–	11	.633
No. 10 Duke	10	–	4	.714	22	–	6	.786
NC State	8	–	6	.571	16	–	9	.640
Maryland	6	–	8	.429	14	–	12	.538
Clemson	5	–	9	.357	10	–	16	.385
South Carolina	2	–	12	.143	9	–	17	.346
Virginia	2	–	12	.143	3	–	23	.115
† 1961 ACC tournament winner Rankings from AP Poll

Date	Opponent	Site	Result
December 2*	vs. Syracuse	Memorial Gym • Kent, Ohio (Midwest Invitational Semifinal)	W 78–67
December 3*	vs. Kent State	Memorial Gym • Kent, Ohio (Midwest Invitational Final)	W 78–67
December 6	NC State	Clemson Field House • Clemson, South Carolina	L 67–70
December 8*	at Marshall	Veterans Memorial Fieldhouse • Huntington, West Virginia	L 65–82
December 12*	at Florida State	Tully Gymnasium • Tallahassee, Florida	L 57–74
December 15	#8 Duke	Clemson Field House • Clemson, South Carolina	L 58–75
December 17*	The Citadel	Clemson Field House • Clemson, South Carolina	W 78–68
December 19*	Florida State	Clemson Field House • Clemson, South Carolina	L 64–65
December 29*	vs. Texas	Houston, Texas (Rice–Texas Classic Semifinal)	W 48–44
December 30*	vs. Rice	Houston, Texas (Rice–Texas Classic Final)	L 65–66
January 4	at Wake Forest	Winston–Salem Memorial Coliseum • Winston-Salem, North Carolina	L 59–81
January 5*	Furman	Clemson Field House • Clemson, South Carolina	W 57–53
January 7*	Davidson	Clemson Field House • Clemson, South Carolina	W 74–63
January 12*	at Furman	Alley Gymnasium • Greenville, South Carolina	L 61–70
January 14	at South Carolina	Carolina Fieldhouse • Columbia, South Carolina	W 71–63
January 16	Wake Forest	Clemson Field House • Clemson, South Carolina	L 65–86
January 28	at #5 Duke	Duke Indoor Stadium • Durham, North Carolina	L 59–79
January 31	at #5 North Carolina	Woollen Gymnasium • Chapel Hill, North Carolina	L 46–77
February 3	Virginia	Clemson Field House • Clemson, South Carolina	W 89–81
February 10	Maryland	Clemson Field House • Clemson, South Carolina	W 76–59
February 17	vs. NC State	Charlotte Coliseum • Charlotte, North Carolina (North–South Doubleheader)	L 52–63
February 18	vs. #7 North Carolina	Charlotte Coliseum • Charlotte, North Carolina (North–South Doubleheader)	L 55–61
February 21	South Carolina	Clemson Field House • Clemson, South Carolina	W 93–72
February 24	at Virginia	Memorial Gymnasium • Charlottesville, Virginia	W 85–63
February 25	at Maryland	Cole Field House • College Park, Maryland	L 80–82 (OT)
March 2*	vs. Maryland	Reynolds Coliseum • Raleigh, North Carolina (ACC Tournament Quarterfinal)	L 75–91
*Non-Conference Game. #Rankings from AP Poll released prior to game.

== 1961–62 ==
1961–62 Clemson Tigers men's basketball
- Conference: Atlantic Coast Conference
- Record: 12–15 (4–10 ACC)
- Head coach: Press Maravich
- Home arena: Clemson Field House

1961–62 ACC men's basketball standings
	Conf.				Overall
Team	W		L	PCT	W		L	PCT
Wake Forest †	12	–	2	.857	22	–	9	.710
No. 10 Duke	11	–	3	.786	20	–	5	.800
NC State	10	–	4	.714	11	–	6	.647
North Carolina	7	–	7	.500	8	–	9	.471
South Carolina	7	–	7	.500	15	–	12	.556
Clemson	4	–	10	.286	12	–	15	.444
Maryland	3	–	11	.214	8	–	17	.320
Virginia	2	–	12	.143	5	–	18	.217
† 1962 ACC tournament winner Rankings from AP Poll

Date	Opponent	Site	Result
December 2*	VMI	Clemson Field House • Clemson, South Carolina	W 87–84
December 5	North Carolina	Clemson Field House • Clemson, South Carolina	L 52–54
December 9	Virginia	Clemson Field House • Clemson, South Carolina	W 70–68 (OT)
December 11	at #6 Duke	Duke Indoor Stadium • Durham, North Carolina	L 66–89
December 14*	at Florida State	Tully Gymnasium • Tallahassee, Florida	W 82–77 (2OT)
December 16*	at The Citadel	The Citadel Armory • Charleston, South Carolina	W 68–62
December 29*	vs. Arkansas	Greenville, South Carolina (Poinsettia Classic Semifinal)	L 60–62
December 30*	vs. Furman	Greenville, South Carolina (Poinsettia Classic Consolation)	L 63–89
January 6	at Wake Forest	Winston–Salem Memorial Coliseum • Winston-Salem, North Carolina	L 54–81
January 8*	Florida State	Clemson Field House • Clemson, South Carolina	W 75–69
January 11	#10 Duke	Clemson Field House • Clemson, South Carolina	L 96–104
January 13*	at Marshall	Veterans Memorial Fieldhouse • Huntington, West Virginia	L 75–90
January 15*	Furman	Clemson Field House • Clemson, South Carolina	W 86–63
January 27	at NC State	Reynolds Coliseum • Raleigh, North Carolina	L 64–80
January 29*	at Furman	Alley Gymnasium • Greenville, South Carolina	W 97–88
February 3	Wake Forest	Clemson Field House • Clemson, South Carolina	L 82–83
February 6	at South Carolina	Carolina Fieldhouse • Columbia, South Carolina	L 74–86
February 10	Maryland	Clemson Field House • Clemson, South Carolina	W 73–61
February 12*	at Davidson	Davidson, North Carolina	L 55–61
February 16	vs. North Carolina	Charlotte Coliseum • Charlotte, North Carolina (North–South Doubleheader)	L 59–69
February 17	vs. NC State	Charlotte Coliseum • Charlotte, North Carolina (North–South Doubleheader)	L 71–73
February 20	South Carolina	Clemson Field House • Clemson, South Carolina	L 81–87
February 23	at Virginia	Memorial Gymnasium • Charlottesville, Virginia	W 72–71
February 24	at Maryland	Cole Field House • College Park, Maryland	W 75–68
March 1*	vs. NC State	Reynolds Coliseum • Raleigh, North Carolina (ACC Tournament Quarterfinal)	W 67–46
March 2*	vs. #8 Duke	Reynolds Coliseum • Raleigh, North Carolina (ACC Tournament Semifinal)	W 77–72
March 3*	vs. Wake Forest	Reynolds Coliseum • Raleigh, North Carolina (ACC Tournament Final)	L 66–77
*Non-Conference Game. #Rankings from AP Poll released prior to game.

== 1962–63 ==
1962–63 Clemson Tigers men's basketball
- Conference: Atlantic Coast Conference
- Record: 12–13 (5–9 ACC)
- Head coach: Bobby Roberts
- Home arena: Clemson Field House

Date	Opponent	Site	Result
December 3	NC State	Clemson Field House • Clemson, South Carolina	L 55–56
December 5	at North Carolina	Woollen Gymnasium • Chapel Hill, North Carolina	L 48–64
December 8*	at Georgia	Woodruff Hall • Athens, Georgia	W 93–73
December 13	#2 Duke	Clemson Field House • Clemson, South Carolina	L 67–92
December 15*	at Creighton	Omaha Civic Auditorium • Omaha, Nebraska	L 67–87
December 17*	at Iowa	Iowa Field House • Iowa City, Iowa	L 64–74
December 28*	vs. Vanderbilt	Greenville, South Carolina (Poinsettia Classic Semifinal)	L 58–60
December 29*	vs. Army	Greenville, South Carolina (Poinsettia Classic Consolation)	W 72–49
January 3*	Georgia	Clemson Field House • Clemson, South Carolina	W 77–60
January 5	at Wake Forest	Winston–Salem Memorial Coliseum • Winston-Salem, North Carolina	L 62–80
January 8*	at Furman	Alley Gymnasium • Greenville, South Carolina	W 66–64
January 12	at #6 Duke	Duke Indoor Stadium • Durham, North Carolina	L 67–78
January 14*	The Citadel	Clemson Field House • Clemson, South Carolina	W 93–65
January 26*	Furman	Clemson Field House • Clemson, South Carolina	W 74–73
January 28*	at VMI	VMI Field House • Lexington, Virginia	W 68–58
February 2	Wake Forest	Clemson Field House • Clemson, South Carolina	W 71–70
February 5	South Carolina	Clemson Field House • Clemson, South Carolina	W 80–61
February 8	Virginia	Clemson Field House • Clemson, South Carolina	W 86–64
February 9	Maryland	Clemson Field House • Clemson, South Carolina	W 62–60
February 15	vs. NC State	Charlotte Coliseum • Charlotte, North Carolina (North–South Doubleheader)	L 50–66
February 16	vs. North Carolina	Charlotte Coliseum • Charlotte, North Carolina (North–South Doubleheader)	L 63–79
February 19	at South Carolina	Carolina Fieldhouse • Columbia, South Carolina	L 45–51
February 22	at Virginia	Memorial Gymnasium • Charlottesville, Virginia	W 52–50
February 22	at Maryland	Cole Field House • College Park, Maryland	L 67–69
February 28*	vs. NC State	Reynolds Coliseum • Raleigh, North Carolina (ACC Tournament Quarterfinal)	L 78–79
*Non-Conference Game. #Rankings from AP Poll released prior to game.

== 1963–64 ==
1963–64 Clemson Tigers men's basketball
- Conference: Atlantic Coast Conference
- Record: 13–12 (8–6 ACC)
- Head coach: Bobby Roberts
- Home arena: Clemson Field House

1963–64 ACC men's basketball standings
	Conf.				Overall
Team	W		L	PCT	W		L	PCT
No. 3 Duke †	13	–	1	.929	26	–	5	.839
Wake Forest	9	–	5	.643	16	–	11	.593
Clemson	8	–	6	.571	13	–	12	.520
South Carolina	7	–	7	.500	10	–	14	.417
North Carolina	6	–	8	.429	12	–	12	.500
Maryland	5	–	9	.357	9	–	17	.346
Virginia	4	–	10	.286	8	–	16	.333
NC State	4	–	10	.286	8	–	11	.421
† 1964 ACC tournament winner Rankings from AP Poll

Date	Opponent	Site	Result
December 3	North Carolina	Clemson Field House • Clemson, South Carolina	W 66–64 (OT)
December 5*	Georgia	Clemson Field House • Clemson, South Carolina	L 86–87
December 8*	The Citadel	The Citadel Armory • Charleston, South Carolina	L 57–68
December 14	at #3 Duke	Duke Indoor Stadium • Durham, North Carolina	L 52–75
December 16	at Maryland	Cole Field House • College Park, Maryland	L 48–56
December 17	at Virginia	Memorial Gymnasium • Charlottesville, Virginia	W 53–52
December 20*	VMI	Clemson Field House • Clemson, South Carolina	W 100–80
December 28*	vs. Texas Western	El Paso, Texas (Sun Bowl Carnival Semifinal)	L 55–76
December 30*	vs. Baylor	El Paso, Texas (Sun Bowl Carnival Consolation)	L 71–73
January 4	at Wake Forest	Winston–Salem Memorial Coliseum • Winston-Salem, North Carolina	W 87–61
January 8	#9 Duke	Clemson Field House • Clemson, South Carolina	L 75–81
January 11*	Erskine	Clemson Field House • Clemson, South Carolina	W 74–64
January 14*	at Furman	Alley Gymnasium • Greenville, South Carolina	W 74–68
January 25	at South Carolina	Carolina Fieldhouse • Columbia, South Carolina	L 56–67
February 4*	Furman	Clemson Field House • Clemson, South Carolina	L 58–66
February 6*	at Georgia	Woodruff Hall • Athens, Georgia	W 83–81 (OT)
February 8	at NC State	Reynolds Coliseum • Raleigh, North Carolina	W 66–52
February 14	vs. North Carolina	Charlotte Coliseum • Charlotte, North Carolina (North–South Doubleheader)	W 97–90 (2OT)
February 15	vs. NC State	Charlotte Coliseum • Charlotte, North Carolina (North–South Doubleheader)	L 43–45 (OT)
February 21	Wake Forest	Clemson Field House • Clemson, South Carolina	L 73–75
February 25	South Carolina	Clemson Field House • Clemson, South Carolina	W 63–50
February 28	Maryland	Clemson Field House • Clemson, South Carolina	W 83–68
February 29	Virginia	Clemson Field House • Clemson, South Carolina	W 90–73
March 5*	vs. Maryland	Reynolds Coliseum • Raleigh, North Carolina (ACC Tournament Quarterfinal)	W 81–67
March 6*	vs. Wake Forest	Reynolds Coliseum • Raleigh, North Carolina (ACC Tournament Semifinal)	L 67–86
*Non-Conference Game. #Rankings from AP Poll released prior to game.

== 1964–65 ==
1964–65 Clemson Tigers men's basketball
- Conference: Atlantic Coast Conference
- Record: 8–15 (4–10 ACC)
- Head coach: Bobby Roberts
- Home arena: Clemson Field House

1964–65 ACC men's basketball standings
	Conf.				Overall
Team	W		L	PCT	W		L	PCT
No. 10 Duke	11	–	3	.786	20	–	5	.800
NC State †	10	–	4	.714	21	–	5	.808
Maryland	10	–	4	.714	18	–	8	.692
North Carolina	10	–	4	.714	15	–	9	.625
Wake Forest	6	–	8	.429	12	–	15	.444
Clemson	4	–	10	.286	8	–	15	.348
Virginia	3	–	11	.214	7	–	18	.280
South Carolina	2	–	12	.143	6	–	17	.261
† 1965 ACC tournament winner Rankings from AP Poll

Date	Opponent	Site	Result
December 1	at North Carolina	Woollen Gymnasium • Chapel Hill, North Carolina	L 59–77
December 5*	Georgia	Clemson Field House • Clemson, South Carolina	W 72–60
December 7*	The Citadel	Clemson Field House • Clemson, South Carolina	W 90–75
December 16	#6 Duke	Clemson Field House • Clemson, South Carolina	L 79–80
December 22*	at Georgia	Woodruff Hall • Athens, Georgia	L 75–93
December 28*	vs. Auburn	Greenville, South Carolina (Poinsettia Classic Semifinal)	W 77–65
December 29*	vs. Baylor	Greenville, South Carolina (Poinsettia Classic Final)	L 59–68
January 5*	Furman	Clemson Field House • Clemson, South Carolina	W 80–66
January 7	Maryland	Clemson Field House • Clemson, South Carolina	L 65–67 (2OT)
January 9	Virginia	Clemson Field House • Clemson, South Carolina	W 99–72
January 12	at #10 Duke	Duke Indoor Stadium • Durham, North Carolina	L 81–106
January 30	South Carolina	Clemson Field House • Clemson, South Carolina	W 94–87
February 1	at Wake Forest	Winston–Salem Memorial Coliseum • Winston-Salem, North Carolina	L 75–82
February 3*	at Georgia Tech	Alexander Memorial Coliseum • Atlanta	L 78–93
February 6	NC State	Clemson Field House • Clemson, South Carolina	L 74–78
February 9*	at Furman	Alley Gymnasium • Greenville, South Carolina	L 61–74
February 13	at South Carolina	Carolina Fieldhouse • Columbia, South Carolina	W 72–67
February 16	Wake Forest	Clemson Field House • Clemson, South Carolina	W 84–65
February 19	vs. NC State	Charlotte Coliseum • Charlotte, North Carolina (North–South Doubleheader)	L 61–62
February 20	vs. North Carolina	Charlotte Coliseum • Charlotte, North Carolina (North–South Doubleheader)	L 84–86
February 26	at Maryland	Cole Field House • College Park, Maryland	L 71–88
February 27	at Virginia	Memorial Gymnasium • Charlottesville, Virginia	L 67–69
March 4*	vs. Maryland	Reynolds Coliseum • Raleigh, North Carolina (ACC Tournament Quarterfinal)	L 50–61
*Non-Conference Game. #Rankings from AP Poll released prior to game.

== 1965–66 ==
1965–66 Clemson Tigers men's basketball

Poinsettia Classic Champions
- Conference: Atlantic Coast Conference
- Record: 15–10 (8–6 ACC)
- Head coach: Bobby Roberts
- Home arena: Clemson Field House

1965–66 ACC men's basketball standings
	Conf.				Overall
Team	W		L	PCT	W		L	PCT
No. 2 Duke †	12	–	2	.857	26	–	4	.867
NC State	9	–	5	.643	18	–	9	.667
Clemson	8	–	6	.571	15	–	10	.600
North Carolina	8	–	6	.571	16	–	11	.593
Maryland	7	–	7	.500	14	–	11	.560
South Carolina	4	–	10	.286	11	–	13	.458
Virginia	4	–	10	.286	7	–	15	.318
Wake Forest	4	–	10	.286	8	–	18	.308
† 1966 ACC tournament winner Rankings from AP Poll

Date	Opponent	Site	Result
December 1	North Carolina	Clemson Field House • Clemson, South Carolina	W 84–74
December 4	at Duke	Duke Indoor Stadium • Durham, North Carolina	L 68–83
December 17*	vs. Alabama	VPI Coliseum • Blacksburg, Virginia (VPI Invitational Semifinal)	W 76–62
December 18*	vs. Virginia Tech	VPI Coliseum • Blacksburg, Virginia (VPI Invitational Final)	L 62–72
December 29*	vs. Ole Miss	Greenville, South Carolina (Poinsettia Classic Semifinal)	W 85–57
December 30*	vs. Manhattan	Greenville, South Carolina (Poinsettia Classic Final)	W 77–67
January 3	at South Carolina	Carolina Fieldhouse • Columbia, South Carolina	L 48–57
January 6*	at Georgia Tech	Alexander Memorial Coliseum • Atlanta	L 72–87
January 11	#1 Duke	Clemson Field House • Clemson, South Carolina	L 85–87
January 15	South Carolina	Clemson Field House • Clemson, South Carolina	W 86–82
January 18*	The Citadel	The Citadel Armory • Charleston, South Carolina	W 70–61
January 22*	Virginia Tech	Clemson Field House • Clemson, South Carolina	L 87–90
January 28	Virginia	Clemson Field House • Clemson, South Carolina	W 70–69
January 29	Maryland	Clemson Field House • Clemson, South Carolina	W 71–66
February 1	at Wake Forest	Winston–Salem Memorial Coliseum • Winston-Salem, North Carolina	W 72–71
February 3*	Furman	Clemson Field House • Clemson, South Carolina	W 107–72
February 5	at NC State	Reynolds Coliseum • Raleigh, North Carolina	L 58–76
February 10*	at Furman	Alley Gymnasium • Greenville, South Carolina	W 98–86
February 14	Wake Forest	Clemson Field House • Clemson, South Carolina	W 104–89
February 18	vs. North Carolina	Charlotte Coliseum • Charlotte, North Carolina (North–South Doubleheader)	L 66–70
February 19	vs. NC State	Charlotte Coliseum • Charlotte, North Carolina (North–South Doubleheader)	W 76–74 (OT)
February 22*	Georgia Tech	Clemson Field House • Clemson, South Carolina	W 106–90
February 25	at Virginia	University Hall • Charlottesville, Virginia	L 61–63
February 26	at Maryland	Cole Field House • College Park, Maryland	W 81–69
March 3*	vs. South Carolina	Reynolds Coliseum • Raleigh, North Carolina (ACC Tournament Quarterfinal)	L 52–60
*Non-Conference Game. #Rankings from AP Poll released prior to game.

== 1966–67 ==
1966–67 Clemson Tigers men's basketball

Poinsettia Classic Champions
- Conference: Atlantic Coast Conference
- Record: 17–8 (9–5 ACC)
- Head coach: Bobby Roberts
- Home arena: Fike Field House

1966–67 ACC men's basketball standings
	Conf.				Overall
Team	W		L	PCT	W		L	PCT
No. 4 North Carolina †	12	–	2	.857	26	–	6	.813
Duke	9	–	3	.750	18	–	9	.667
South Carolina	8	–	4	.667	16	–	7	.696
Clemson	9	–	5	.643	17	–	8	.680
Wake Forest	5	–	9	.357	9	–	18	.333
Maryland	5	–	9	.357	11	–	14	.440
Virginia	4	–	10	.286	9	–	17	.346
NC State	2	–	12	.143	7	–	19	.269
† 1967 ACC tournament winner Rankings from AP Poll

Date	Opponent	Site	Result
December 1	at North Carolina	Carmichael Auditorium • Chapel Hill, North Carolina	L 65–76
December 3*	The Citadel	Fike Field House • Clemson, South Carolina	W 102–85
December 16*	vs. Miami (FL)	Knoxville, Tennessee (Volunteer Classic Semifinal)	W 73–64 (OT)
December 17*	vs. Tennessee	Knoxville, Tennessee (Volunteer Classic Final)	L 44–52
December 29*	vs. LSU	Greenville, South Carolina (Poinsettia Classic Semifinal)	W 92–82
December 30*	vs. Furman	Greenville, South Carolina (Poinsettia Classic Final)	W 83–66
January 5*	at Georgia Tech	Alexander Memorial Coliseum • Atlanta	W 76–55
January 7	at South Carolina	Carolina Fieldhouse • Columbia, South Carolina	W 80–68
January 10	at Duke	Duke Indoor Stadium • Durham, North Carolina	L 61–85
January 12*	at Furman	Alley Gymnasium • Greenville, South Carolina	W 69–68
January 14	at Virginia	University Hall • Charlottesville, Virginia	W 102–88
January 16	at Maryland	Cole Field House • College Park, Maryland	L 48–68
January 19*	at Furman	Alley Gymnasium • Greenville, South Carolina	W 82–67
January 21*	at Virginia Tech	VPI Coliseum • Blacksburg, Virginia	W 70–68
January 24*	Georgia Tech	Fike Field House • Clemson, South Carolina	L 77–88
January 31	at Wake Forest	Winston–Salem Memorial Coliseum • Winston-Salem, North Carolina	L 80–90
February 4	NC State	Fike Field House • Clemson, South Carolina	W 80–60
February 7	South Carolina	Fike Field House • Clemson, South Carolina	W 73–57
February 11	Wake Forest	Fike Field House • Clemson, South Carolina	W 70–68
February 14	#14 Duke	Fike Field House • Clemson, South Carolina	W 73–68
February 17	vs. NC State	Charlotte Coliseum • Charlotte, North Carolina (North–South Doubleheader)	W 62–50
February 18	vs. #4 North Carolina	Charlotte Coliseum • Charlotte, North Carolina (North–South Doubleheader)	W 92–88
February 25	Maryland	Fike Field House • Clemson, South Carolina	W 65–61
February 27	Virginia	Fike Field House • Clemson, South Carolina	L 71–73
March 9*	vs. Wake Forest	Greensboro Coliseum • Greensboro, North Carolina (ACC Tournament Quarterfinal)	L 61–63 (2OT)
*Non-Conference Game. #Rankings from AP Poll released prior to game.

== 1967–68 ==
1967–68 Clemson Tigers men's basketball
- Conference: Atlantic Coast Conference
- Record: 4–20 (3–11 ACC)
- Head coach: Bobby Roberts
- Home arena: Fike Field House

1967–68 ACC men's basketball standings
	Conf.				Overall
Team	W		L	PCT	W		L	PCT
No. 4 North Carolina †	12	–	2	.857	28	–	4	.875
No. 10 Duke	11	–	3	.786	22	–	6	.786
NC State	9	–	5	.643	16	–	10	.615
South Carolina	9	–	5	.643	15	–	7	.682
Virginia	5	–	9	.357	9	–	16	.360
Maryland	4	–	10	.286	8	–	16	.333
Clemson	3	–	11	.214	4	–	20	.167
Wake Forest	3	–	11	.214	5	–	21	.192
† 1968 ACC tournament winner Rankings from AP Poll

Date	Opponent	Site	Result
December 4*	at The Citadel	The Citadel Armory • Charleston, South Carolina	L 70–74
December 29*	vs. Hardin–Simmons	Greenville, South Carolina (Poinsettia Classic Semifinal)	L 63–77
December 30*	vs. Furman	Greenville, South Carolina (Poinsettia Classic Consolation)	W 78–53
January 4*	Furman	Fike Field House • Clemson, South Carolina	L 68–70
January 6	South Carolina	Fike Field House • Clemson, South Carolina	L 71–93
January 9	at Duke	Duke Indoor Stadium • Durham, North Carolina	L 79–101
January 11	Virginia	Fike Field House • Clemson, South Carolina	L 92–95
January 13	#3 North Carolina	Fike Field House • Clemson, South Carolina	L 83–115
January 15	Maryland	Fike Field House • Clemson, South Carolina	W 94–93 (2OT)
January 20	at Virginia	University Hall • Charlottesville, Virginia	L 73–81
January 24*	at LSU	Parker Coliseum • Baton Rouge, Louisiana	L 81–104
January 27*	Virginia Tech	Fike Field House • Clemson, South Carolina	L 78–101
January 30	Wake Forest	Fike Field House • Clemson, South Carolina	W 70–67
February 1*	at Georgia Tech	Alexander Memorial Coliseum • Atlanta	L 64–99
February 3	at NC State	Reynolds Coliseum • Raleigh, North Carolina	L 66–78
February 7	at South Carolina	Carolina Fieldhouse • Columbia, South Carolina	L 74–89
February 10	at Wake Forest	Winston–Salem Memorial Coliseum • Winston-Salem, North Carolina	W 78–66
February 16	vs. #3 North Carolina	Charlotte Coliseum • Charlotte, North Carolina (North–South Doubleheader)	L 74–96
February 17	vs. NC State	Charlotte Coliseum • Charlotte, North Carolina (North–South Doubleheader)	L 67–69
February 20	#8 Duke	Fike Field House • Clemson, South Carolina	L 70–82
February 22*	at Furman	Alley Gymnasium • Greenville, South Carolina	L 64–66
February 24	at Maryland	Cole Field House • College Park, Maryland	L 68–81
February 28*	Georgia Tech	Fike Field House • Clemson, South Carolina	L 51–80
March 7*	vs. #6 Duke	Charlotte Coliseum • Charlotte, North Carolina (ACC Tournament Quarterfinal)	L 40–43
*Non-Conference Game. #Rankings from AP Poll released prior to game.

== 1968–69 ==
1968–69 Clemson Tigers men's basketball
- Conference: Atlantic Coast Conference
- Record: 6–19 (2–12 ACC)
- Head coach: Bobby Roberts
- Home arena: Littlejohn Coliseum

1968–69 ACC men's basketball standings
	Conf.				Overall
Team	W		L	PCT	W		L	PCT
No. 4 North Carolina †	12	–	2	.857	27	–	5	.844
No. 13 South Carolina	11	–	3	.786	21	–	7	.750
Duke	8	–	6	.571	15	–	13	.536
NC State	8	–	6	.571	15	–	10	.600
Wake Forest	8	–	6	.571	18	–	9	.667
Virginia	5	–	9	.357	10	–	15	.400
Maryland	2	–	12	.143	8	–	18	.308
Clemson	2	–	12	.143	6	–	19	.240
† 1969 ACC tournament winner Rankings from AP Poll

Littlejohn Coliseum was opened with a win over Georgia Tech.

Date	Opponent	Site	Result
November 30*	Georgia Tech	Littlejohn Coliseum • Clemson, South Carolina	W 76–72
December 7*	LSU	Littlejohn Coliseum • Clemson, South Carolina	L 85–86
December 16	#2 North Carolina	Carmichael Auditorium • Chapel Hill, North Carolina	L 69–90
December 19*	at Alabama	Memorial Coliseum • Tuscaloosa, Alabama	W 96–74
December 21*	vs. Auburn	Municipal Auditorium • Birmingham, Alabama	L 72–92
December 28	at Duke	Duke Indoor Stadium • Durham, North Carolina	L 70–96
January 2*	The Citadel	Littlejohn Coliseum • Clemson, South Carolina	L 72–73
January 4	at South Carolina	Carolina Coliseum • Columbia, South Carolina	L 62–77
January 8*	at Georgia Tech	Alexander Memorial Coliseum • Atlanta	L 66–72
January 11	at Virginia	University Hall • Charlottesville, Virginia	L 75–82
January 13	at Maryland	Cole Field House • College Park, Maryland	L 78–83
January 16*	Furman	Littlejohn Coliseum • Clemson, South Carolina	W 91–70
January 23*	at Furman	Alley Gymnasium • Greenville, South Carolina	W 95–82
January 25*	at Virginia Tech	VPI Coliseum • Blacksburg, Virginia	L 75–86
February 1	NC State	Littlejohn Coliseum • Clemson, South Carolina	W 78–77
February 5	Duke	Littlejohn Coliseum • Clemson, South Carolina	L 76–85
February 7*	Florida State	Littlejohn Coliseum • Clemson, South Carolina	L 67–70
February 10	South Carolina	Littlejohn Coliseum • Clemson, South Carolina	L 79–106
February 14	vs. NC State	Charlotte Coliseum • Charlotte, North Carolina (North–South Doubleheader)	L 74–84
February 15	vs. #2 North Carolina	Charlotte Coliseum • Charlotte, North Carolina (North–South Doubleheader)	L 81–107
February 18	at Wake Forest	Winston–Salem Memorial Coliseum • Winston-Salem, North Carolina	L 84–100
February 22	Maryland	Littlejohn Coliseum • Clemson, South Carolina	L 83–84
February 24	Virginia	Littlejohn Coliseum • Clemson, South Carolina	W 92–90
February 27	Wake Forest	Littlejohn Coliseum • Clemson, South Carolina	L 104–112 (2OT)
March 6*	vs. #4 North Carolina	Charlotte Coliseum • Charlotte, North Carolina (ACC Tournament Quarterfinal)	L 70–94
*Non-Conference Game. #Rankings from AP Poll released prior to game.
