= Len Chappell =

American basketball player (1941–2018)

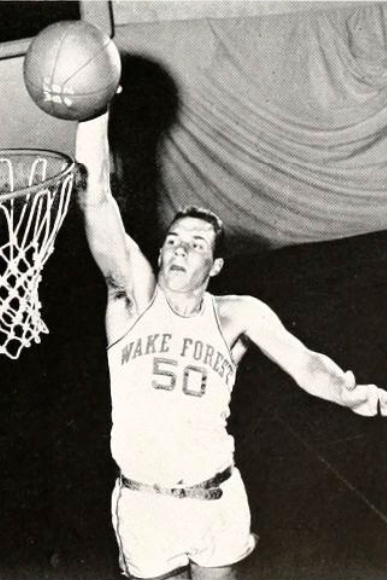
- Chappell as a junior at Wake Forest

Personal information
- Born: January 31, 1941 Portage, Pennsylvania, U.S.
- Died: July 12, 2018 (aged 77) Oconomowoc, Wisconsin, U.S.
- Listed height: 6 ft 8 in (2.03 m)
- Listed weight: 240 lb (109 kg)

Career information
- High school: Portage (Portage, Pennsylvania)
- College: Wake Forest (1959–1962)
- NBA draft: 1962: 1st round, 4th overall pick
- Drafted by: Syracuse Nationals
- Playing career: 1962–1972
- Position: Power forward / center
- Number: 23, 24, 17, 19, 50, 25, 40

Career history
- 1962–1963: Syracuse Nationals / Philadelphia 76ers
- 1963–1966: New York Knicks
- 1966: Chicago Bulls
- 1966–1967: Cincinnati Royals
- 1967–1968: Detroit Pistons
- 1968–1970: Milwaukee Bucks
- 1970: Cleveland Cavaliers
- 1970–1971: Atlanta Hawks
- 1971–1972: Dallas Chaparrals

Career highlights
- NBA All-Star (1964); Consensus first-team All-American (1962); 2× ACC Player of the Year (1961, 1962); ACC Athlete of the Year (1962); 3× First-team All-ACC (1960–1962); No. 50 retired by Wake Forest Demon Deacons
- Stats at NBA.com
- Stats at Basketball Reference

Leonard Roy Chappell (January 31, 1941 – July 12, 2018) was an American basketball player. He played for 10 years in the National Basketball Association (NBA) and the American Basketball Association (ABA) and was selected to one NBA All-Star Game. He played college basketball for the Wake Forest Demon Deacons in the Atlantic Coast Conference (ACC) from 1959 to 1962. He was the ACC Player of the Year twice, led the ACC in scoring and rebounding in the same season twice, was first-team All-ACC three times, led his team to two ACC tournament championships as the Most Valuable Player both of those years, and was a consensus All-American as a senior while leading his team to the NCAA final four in 1962.

== Early life ==
Chappell was born on January 31, 1941, in Portage, Pennsylvania. His father John was a coal miner. He attended Portage Joint High School, where he was on the basketball team. As a sophomore (1955–56) he scored 522 points. As a junior (1956–57), he scored 741 points for a 32.2 points per game average, third highest in Pennsylvania. As a 6 ft 8 in (2.03 m) 230 lb (104.3 kg) 17-year old senior (1957-1958), playing center, he was the second leading high school scorer in the United States, averaging 37.7 points per game. He had a 66 per cent field goal percentage. In his 74-game high school career, he scored either 2,240 points, or 2,270 points (30.7 points per game).

At that time, Wilt Chamberlain was the only other Pennsylvania high school basketball player to score more than 2,000 points in three years (2,252). As a senior, he also led all Pennsylvania high school basketball players with 592 rebounds (22.7 rebounds per game). Because many of his games were lopsided victories, his coach Jim Hess would take Chappell out of games after the third quarter.

Chappell's senior scoring average was a record for Pennsylvania high schools, and his 977 points in 26 games was a Class A basketball state record. Both the Associated Press (AP) and United Press International (UPI) named Chappell first-team Pennsylvania All-State; and he was selected to play in the first East-West high school All-Star Game, held in Monticello, New York.

== College career ==
Chappell was contacted by 70 colleges, and chose to attend Wake Forest University.

Chappell was a star at Wake Forest, playing in the Atlantic Coast Conference (ACC), where he was a teammate of future college sports broadcaster and color commentator Billy Packer for three years (1959-1962), under head coach Bones McKinney. He led the ACC both in total points and rebounds for all three seasons. He played both center and power forward during his career at Wake Forest. As a sophomore (1959–60), he averaged 17.4 points and 12.5 rebounds per game; second in the ACC in both categories. He was named first-team All-ACC.

As a 6 ft 8 in 240 lb junior, Chappell was named first-team All-ACC and the ACC Men's Basketball Player of the Year in 1961. He averaged 26.6 points and 14 rebounds per game; leading the ACC in both categories; even though hampered by a knee injury early in the season. Chappell was an Associated Press honorable mention All-American in 1961.

He led the team in winning the 1961 ACC tournament, and was the tournament's Most Valuable Player. Wake Forest reached the round of eight in the 1961 NCAA tournament, defeating St. John's University and St. Bonaventure University, before losing to St. Joseph's University. Chappell had 87 points (29 points per game) and 51 rebounds (17 rebounds per game) over the three games. He had 32 points and 16 rebounds in the 96–86 loss to St. Joseph's University. He was named to the NCAA tournament's East All-Region team.

As a senior (1961–62), he averaged 31.1 points and 15.2 rebounds per game, again leading the ACC in both categories. He led the Demon Deacons to the 1962 ACC tournament championship. Wake Forest went on to a third-place finish in the 1962 NCAA tournament. He was again named first team All-ACC, Most Valuable Player in the ACC tournament, and the ACC Men's Basketball Player of the Year. He was named to the 1962 NCAA All-Tournament Team. He was a first team consensus All-American.

In the five games Chappell played in the NCAA tournament, he had 134 points (26.8 points per game) and 86 rebounds (17.2 rebounds per game). He had 27 points and 18 rebounds in their sole loss, to Ohio State University, 84–68; a team that included future Naismith Hall of Fame players John Havlicek and Jerry Lucas. Chappell outscored and outrebounded both Lucas and Havlicek individually in that game. The Associated Press ranked Ohio State No. 1 that season, even after they lost to the University of Cincinnati in the NCAA championship game.

== Professional career ==
After college, the Syracuse Nationals selected Chappell with the fourth pick in the 1962 NBA draft, but sixth overall after Dave DeBusschere and Jerry Lucas had been taken as territorial picks before the draft. Chappell was also drafted by the Pittsburgh Rens of the short-lived American Basketball League.

In 1962-63, Chappell played one full season with the Nationals. He played in all 80 games, averaging 15.5 minutes, 8.9 points and 5.8 rebounds per game, playing as a reserve power forward. The Nationals lost in the first round of the 1963 NBA playoffs to the Cincinnati Royals in five games. Chappell averaged 5.3 points and 4.5 rebounds in 13.3 minutes per game over the four games he played in that series.

The following season (1963–64) the team moved to Philadelphia and was renamed the 76ers. After one game in Philadelphia, the New York Knicks purchased his contract. After moving to New York, he had his best professional season with any team, averaging career-highs of 31.9 minutes, 17.3 points and 9.8 rebounds per game with the Knicks, over 78 games. Chappell earned his only All-Star selection that season. He was second on the Knicks in scoring average (slightly behind Bob Boozer who played in 29 less games for the Knicks that season), and second in rebounding to Johnny Green's 10 per game.

In the 1964-65 season, Chappell started the season slowly at forward, with some minor injuries. Knicks head coach Eddie Donovan replaced him at forward, starting Boozer and Green, and then later Jim Barnes. Donovan moved Chappell to backup center behind Rookie of the Year Willis Reed; a position Chappell felt did not suit him. Donovan was fired during the season and replaced by Harry Gallatin, but this did not change Chappell's circumstances. He played in only 43 games that season, averaging 15.2 minutes, 8.3 points and 3.3 rebounds per game. The following season, with Walt Bellamy now joining the Knicks at center and Reed moved to power forward, Chappell played even less, now as a reserve power forward. He played in only 46 games, averaging 5.3 points and 2.8 rebounds in 11.8 minutes per game.

After the 1965-66 season ended, the Knicks left Chappell unprotected, and he was selected by the Chicago Bulls in the expansion draft. He scored the first basket in Chicago Bulls history on October 15, 1966. Chappell played in only 19 games for the Bulls, averaging less than 10 minutes per game. In late November 1966, the Bulls traded Chappell to the Cincinnati Royals for reserve player George Wilson. At Cincinnati, he was a backup center, and averaged less than 10 minutes per game in 54 games.

He began the 1967-68 season with the Royals, and had played less than seven minutes a game in 10 games when he was traded in late November to the Detroit Pistons for a third round draft pick and cash. He was given a greater opportunity to play in Detroit, and averaged 10 points and 6.1 rebounds in 17.5 minutes per game, over 57 games; playing backup center. His scoring average was 2.5 points higher than starting center Joe Strawder, who averaged 10 more minutes played per game.

In May 1968, he was again left unprotected in an expansion draft, this time being selected by the Milwaukee Bucks. Chappell had his second-best NBA season in 1968-69. He averaged nearly 28 minutes per game and played in 80 games, playing power forward. He averaged 14.6 points and 8.0 rebounds per game. While on the Bucks during their inaugural season, on December 19, 1968, he scored a career-best 35 points during a 113–111 loss to the Chicago Bulls.

The following season (1969–70) he was back in a reserve forward role behind starting forwards 22-year old future Hall of Fame rookie Bob Dandridge and 23-year old Greg Smith, and forward Zaid Abdul-Aziz (formerly Don Smith). This was also center Kareem Abdul-Jabbar's rookie season. Chappell averaged a little over 15 minutes a game, with 8.3 points and 3.7 rebounds per game averages. He averaged 9.5 points per game in the Bucks first round playoff win over the Philadelphia 76ers that season. The Bucks lost in five games in the next playoff round to the eventual NBA champion New York Knicks. Chappell averaged 15.2 minutes, 6.2 points and 4.2 rebounds per game in that series.

In May 1970, for the third time in his career, Chappell was exposed to the expansion draft. He was selected by the expansion Cleveland Cavaliers. He played only six games for the Cavaliers and was waived. The Atlanta Hawks then signed Chappell at the end of October 1970. In the remainder of his final NBA season, Chappell played in 42 games for the Hawks, averaging nearly 11 minutes, 4.8 points and 3.2 rebounds per game.

In 1971-72, Chappell played his final season of profession basketball, with the Dallas Chaparrals of the American Basketball Association. He appeared in 79 games, averaging nearly 18 minutes per game. He averaged 7.7 points and 4.0 rebounds per game. The Chaparrals were swept by the Utah Stars in four games in the first round of the 1972 playoffs. Chappell appeared in all four games, averaging 22.3 minutes, 7.3 points and 4.5 rebounds per game.

== Legacy and honors ==
In 1962, he became Wake Forest's first consensus All-American. Chappell was the ACC Athlete of the Year in 1962. He was the ACC tournament's all-time leading scorer (220 career points) until Duke University's J. J. Redick surpassed him in 2006. Chappell was named to the ACC 50th Anniversary men's basketball team in 2002, honoring him as one of the 50 greatest players in Atlantic Coast Conference history.

He is a member of the Wake Forest Hall of Fame. His jersey No. 50 is retired by Wake Forest. At the time of his death, he ranked third in school history in total career points (2,165) and rebounds (1,213). He is a member of the Cambria County, Pennsylvania Sports Hall of Fame.

Along with George Wilson, for whom he was once traded, and McCoy McLemore, Chappell was one of three players taken in three distinct expansion drafts between 1966 and 1995.

== Personal life and death ==
Chappell and his wife Joanne founded Chappell Sports, a store in New Berlin, Wisconsin and product promotion company. His sons were both college basketball centers; Jason at the University of Wisconsin, and John at the University of South Carolina.

Chappell suffered a brain hemorrhage after a fall at his home in Waterford, Wisconsin in April 2018 and later suffered a stroke and pneumonia. He died July 12, 2018, at a hospice in Oconomowoc, Wisconsin.

== NBA & ABA career statistics ==
Legend
GP	Games played	GS	Games started	MPG	Minutes per game
FG%	Field goal percentage	3P%	3-point field goal percentage	FT%	Free throw percentage
RPG	Rebounds per game	APG	Assists per game	SPG	Steals per game
BPG	Blocks per game	PPG	Points per game	**Bold**	Career high

=== Regular season ===
Year	Team	GP	GS	MPG	FG%	3P%	FT%	RPG	APG	SPG	BPG	PPG
1962–63	Syracuse	**80**	-	15.5	.465	-	.622	5.8	0.7	-	-	8.9
1963–64	Philadelphia	1	-	16.0	.000	-	.500	4.0	0.0	-	-	1.0
1963–64	New York	78	-	**31.9**	.449	-	.716	**9.8**	1.1	-	-	**17.3**
1964–65	New York	43	-	15.2	.395	-	.680	3.3	0.3	-	-	8.3
1965–66	New York	46	-	11.8	.420	-	.590	2.8	0.6	-	-	5.3
1966–67	Chicago	19	-	9.4	.449	-	.667	2.0	0.6	-	-	4.9
1966–67	Cincinnati	54	-	9.8	.411	-	.650	2.8	0.4	-	-	4.1
1967–68	Cincinnati	10	-	6.5	.500	-	.800	1.5	0.5	-	-	3.8
1967–68	Detroit	57	-	17.5	**.514**	-	.707	6.1	0.8	-	-	10.0
1968–69	Milwaukee	80	-	27.6	.454	-	.737	8.0	**1.2**	-	-	14.6
1969–70	Milwaukee	75	-	15.1	.465	-	.640	3.7	0.7	-	-	8.3
1970–71	Cleveland	6	-	14.3	.395	-	.786	3.0	0.2	-	-	6.8
1970–71	Atlanta	42	-	10.7	.441	-	**.811**	3.2	0.4	-	-	4.8
1971–72	Dallas	79	-	17.8	.452	-	.746	4.0	0.9	-	-	7.7
Career		670	-	17.9	.452	-	.697	5.1	0.8	-	-	9.3

=== Playoffs ===
Year	Team	GP	GS	MPG	FG%	3P%	FT%	RPG	APG	SPG	BPG	PPG
1962–63	Syracuse	4	-	13.3	.190	-	**.813**	**4.5**	0.8	-	-	5.3
1966–67	Cincinnati	4	-	16.5	.370	-	.500	3.3	**2.3**	-	-	5.5
1967–68	Detroit	5	-	4.2	.286	-	.500	2.4	0.0	-	-	1.4
1969–70	Milwaukee	**9**	-	14.8	**.560**	-	.684	2.9	0.6	-	-	**7.7**
1971–72	Dallas	4	-	**22.3**	.500	-	.625	**4.5**	0.8	-	-	7.3
Career		26	-	13.9	.434	-	.679	3.3	0.8	-	-	5.7

== See also ==
- List of NCAA Division I men's basketball players with 2,000 points and 1,000 rebounds
