= 1961–62 Wake Forest Demon Deacons men's basketball team =

American college basketball season

1961–62 Wake Forest Demon Deacons men's basketball
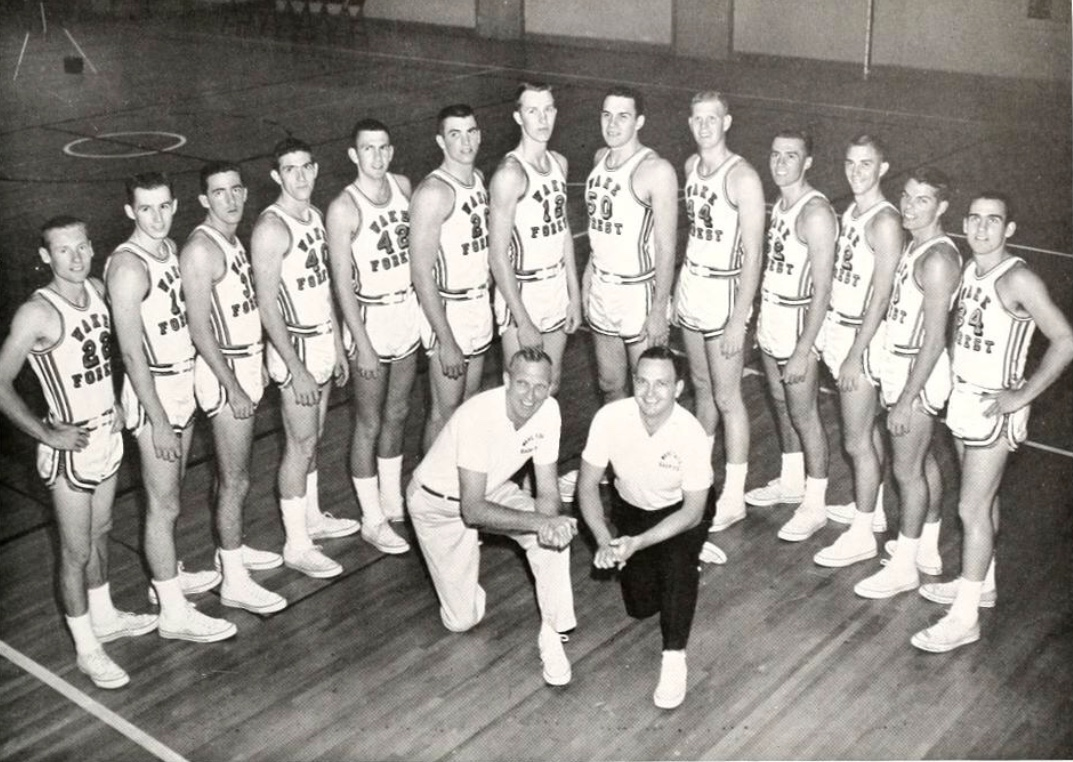

ACC regular season champion ACC Tournament champion

NCAA Men's Division I Tournament, Final Four
- Conference: Atlantic Coast Conference

Ranking
- Coaches: No. 7
- Record: 22–9 (12–2 ACC)
- Head coach: Bones McKinney (5th season)
- Home arena: Winston-Salem Memorial Coliseum

1961–62 ACC men's basketball standings
	Conf.				Overall
Team	W		L	PCT	W		L	PCT
Wake Forest †	12	–	2	.857	22	–	9	.710
No. 10 Duke	11	–	3	.786	20	–	5	.800
NC State	10	–	4	.714	11	–	6	.647
North Carolina	7	–	7	.500	8	–	9	.471
South Carolina	7	–	7	.500	15	–	12	.556
Clemson	4	–	10	.286	12	–	15	.444
Maryland	3	–	11	.214	8	–	17	.320
Virginia	2	–	12	.143	5	–	18	.217
† 1962 ACC tournament winner Rankings from AP Poll

The 1961–62 Wake Forest Demon Deacons men's basketball team represented Wake Forest University.

== Roster ==
1961–62 Wake Forest Demon Deacons men's basketball team
Players
Coaches

Pos.	#	Name	Height	Weight	Year	Hometown
G		Billy Packer	—	—	Sr	Bethlehem, Pennsylvania
F/C	50	Len Chappell	6 ft 8 in (2.03 m)	230 lb (104 kg)	Sr	Portage, Pennsylvania

Head coach

- Bones McKinney

Assistant coach(es)

Legend

- (C) Team captain
- (S) Suspended
- (I) Ineligible
- (W) Walk-on
- Injured
- Current redshirt

== Schedule and results ==
Date time, TV	Rank^{#}	Opponent^{#}	Result	Record	Site city, state
Regular Season
Dec 2, 1961*	No. 3	Davidson	W 96–62	1–0	Winston-Salem Memorial Coliseum; Winston-Salem, North Carolina
Dec 5, 1961	No. 3	NC State	W 77–65	2–0 (1–0)	Winston-Salem Memorial Coliseum; Winston-Salem, North Carolina
Dec 9, 1961*	No. 3	No. 1 Ohio State	L 62–84	2–1	Winston-Salem Memorial Coliseum; Winston-Salem, North Carolina
Dec 12, 1961*	No. 3	at Florida	L 65–71	2–2	Florida Gymnasium; Gainesville, Florida
Dec 15, 1961	No. 3	at Virginia	W 84–65	3–2 (2–0)	Memorial Gymnasium; Charlottesville, Virginia
Dec 16, 1961	No. 3	at Maryland	L 62–79	3–3 (2–1)	Cole Fieldhouse; College Park, Maryland
Dec 30, 1961		vs. No. 10 Duke	L 73–75	3–4	Greensboro Coliseum; Greensboro, North Carolina
Jan 2, 1962*		Minnesota	W 79–70	4–4	Winston-Salem Memorial Coliseum; Winston-Salem, North Carolina
Jan 6, 1962		Clemson	W 81–54	5–4 (3–1)	Winston-Salem Memorial Coliseum; Winston-Salem, North Carolina
Jan 10, 1962*		North Carolina	W 91–72	6–4 (4–1)	Winston-Salem Memorial Coliseum; Winston-Salem, North Carolina
Jan 12, 1962*		at Saint Francis (PA)	W 71–66	7–4	Doyle Hall; Loretto, Pennsylvania
Jan 13, 1962*		at Saint Joseph's	L 63–65	7–5	Alumni Memorial Fieldhouse; Philadelphia, Pennsylvania
Jan 27, 1962		at No. 7 Duke	L 68–82	7–6 (4–2)	Cameron Indoor Stadium; Durham, North Carolina
Jan 31, 1962*		at West Virginia	L 99–101	7–7	Charleston Civic Center; Charleston, West Virginia
Feb 2, 1962		at South Carolina	W 78–74	8–7 (5–2)	Carolina Fieldhouse; Columbia, South Carolina
Feb 3, 1962		at Clemson	W 83–82	9–7 (6–2)	Clemson Field House; Clemson, South Carolina
Feb 8, 1962*		at Virginia Tech	L 81–87	9–8	Cassell Coliseum; Blacksburg, Virginia
Feb 10, 1962		at North Carolina	W 87–80	10–8 (7–2)	Woollen Gymnasium; Chapel Hill, North Carolina
Feb 12, 1962		Virginia	W 116–67	11–8 (8–2)	Winston-Salem Memorial Coliseum; Winston-Salem, North Carolina
Feb 15, 1962		No. 7 Duke	W 97–79	12–8 (9–2)	Winston-Salem Memorial Coliseum; Winston-Salem, North Carolina
Feb 17, 1962		Maryland	W 81–78	13–8 (10–2)	Winston-Salem Memorial Coliseum; Winston-Salem, North Carolina
Feb 21, 1962		at NC State	W 69–62	14–8 (11–2)	Reynolds Coliseum; Raleigh, North Carolina
Feb 24, 1962		South Carolina	W 97–85	15–8 (12–2)	Winston-Salem Memorial Coliseum; Winston-Salem, North Carolina
ACC Tournament
Mar 1, 1962*		vs. Virginia; ACC Tournament Quarterfinal	W 81–58	16–8	Reynolds Coliseum; Raleigh, North Carolina
Mar 2, 1962*		vs. South Carolina; ACC Tournament Semifinal	W 88–75	17–8	Reynolds Coliseum; Raleigh, North Carolina
Mar 3, 1962*		vs. Clemson; ACC tournament championship	W 77–66	18–8	Reynolds Coliseum; Raleigh, North Carolina
NCAA Tournament
Mar 12, 1962*		vs. Yale; First round	W 92–82 ^{OT}	19–8	Palestra; Philadelphia, Pennsylvania
Mar 16, 1962*		vs. Saint Joseph's; East regional semifinal	W 96–85 ^{OT}	20–8	Cole Fieldhouse; College Park, Maryland
Mar 17, 1962*		vs. Villanova; East Regional Final	W 79–69	21–8	Cole Fieldhouse; College Park, Maryland
Mar 23, 1962*		vs. No. 1 Ohio State; National semifinal	L 68–84	21–9	Freedom Hall; Louisville, Kentucky
Mar 24, 1962*		vs. UCLA; National consolation Game – Third Place	W 82–80	22–9	Freedom Hall; Louisville, Kentucky
*Non-conference game. ^{#}Rankings from AP Poll. (#) Tournament seedings in parentheses. E=East. All times are in Eastern Time.

=== NCAA basketball tournament ===
- East
  - Wake Forest 92, Yale 82
  - Wake Forest 96, St. Joseph's, Pennsylvania 85
  - Wake Forest 79, Villanova 69
- Final Four
  - Ohio State 84, Wake Forest 68
- Third-place game
  - Wake Forest 82, UCLA 80

== Awards and honors ==
- Len Chappell – ACC Player of the Year (2x)

== Team players drafted into the NBA ==
Round	Pick	Player	NBA club
1	5	Len Chappell	Syracuse Nationals

== Other notable players ==
- Billy Packer, who would become famous as a college basketball broadcaster.
