= 1967–68 Duke Blue Devils men's basketball team =

American college basketball season

1967–68 Duke Blue Devils men's basketball

NIT tournament, Quarterfinals
- Conference: Atlantic Coast Conference

Ranking
- Coaches: No. 11
- AP: No. 10
- Record: 22–6 (11–3 ACC)
- Head coach: Vic Bubas
- Home arena: Duke Indoor Stadium

1967–68 ACC men's basketball standings
	Conf.				Overall
Team	W		L	PCT	W		L	PCT
No. 4 North Carolina †	12	–	2	.857	28	–	4	.875
No. 10 Duke	11	–	3	.786	22	–	6	.786
NC State	9	–	5	.643	16	–	10	.615
South Carolina	9	–	5	.643	15	–	7	.682
Virginia	5	–	9	.357	9	–	16	.360
Maryland	4	–	10	.286	8	–	16	.333
Clemson	3	–	11	.214	4	–	20	.167
Wake Forest	3	–	11	.214	5	–	21	.192
† 1968 ACC tournament winner Rankings from AP Poll

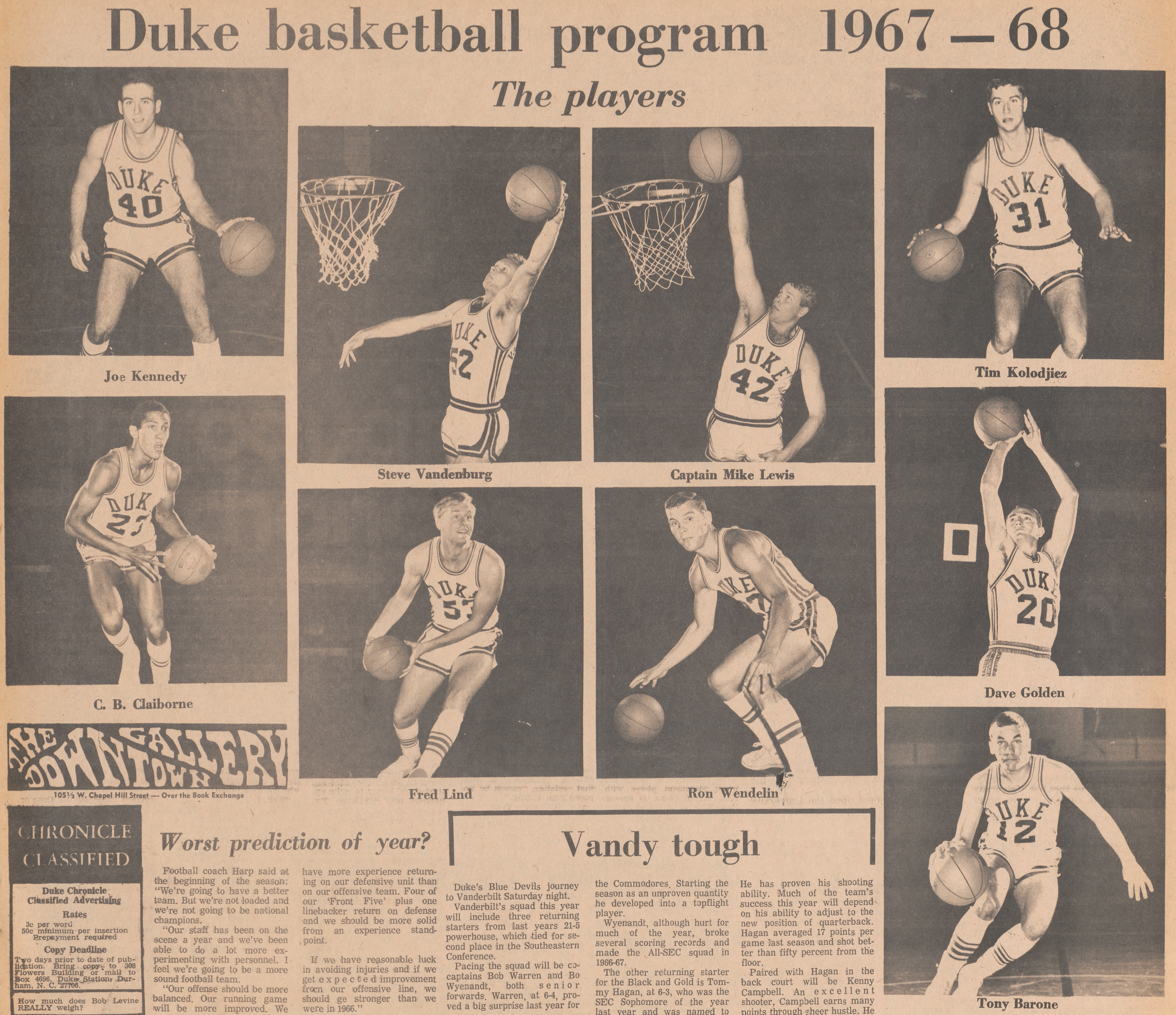
The 1967–68 team featured in the Duke Chronicle

The 1967–68 Duke Blue Devils men's basketball team represented Duke University in the 1967–68 NCAA Division I men's basketball season. The head coach was Vic Bubas and the team finished the season with an overall record of 22–6 and did not qualify for the NCAA tournament.

== Roster ==
1967–68 Duke Blue Devils men's basketball team
Players
Coaches

Pos.	#	Name	Height	Weight	Year	Hometown
G	12	Tony Barone	5 ft 9 in (1.75 m)	—	Sr	Chicago, Ill.
G	23	C. B. Claiborne	6 ft 2 in (1.88 m)	—	Jr	Danville, Va.
G	20	Dave Golden	6 ft 0 in (1.83 m)	—	Jr
F	33	Doug Jackson	—	—
F	40	Joe Kennedy	6 ft 6 in (1.98 m)	210 lb (95 kg)	Sr	Bowie, Md.
F	31	Tim Kolodziej	6 ft 5 in (1.96 m)	—	Sr	Amsterdam, N.Y.
G	41	Ray Kuhlmeier	6 ft 2 in (1.88 m)	—	So
C	42	Mike Lewis (C)	6 ft 7 in (2.01 m)	225 lb (102 kg)	Sr	Missoula, Mont.
F	53	Fred Lind	6 ft 7 in (2.01 m)	215 lb (98 kg)	Jr	Highland Park, Ill.
G	43	John Posen	6 ft 3 in (1.91 m)	—	So
F	50	Glen Smiley	—	—	So
F	34	Tim Teer	6 ft 3 in (1.91 m)	—	So
F	52	Steve Vandenberg	6 ft 7 in (2.01 m)	220 lb (100 kg)	Jr	Cresaptown, Md.
G	22	Ron Wendelin	6 ft 7 in (2.01 m)	—	Sr

Head coach

Vic Bubas

Assistant coach(es)

Legend

- (C) Team captain
- (S) Suspended
- (I) Ineligible
- (W) Walk-on
- Injured
- Current redshirt

Roster

Compiled from multiple sources

== Schedule ==
Date time, TV	Rank^{#}	Opponent^{#}	Result	Record	Site city, state
Regular season
December 1, 1967*		vs. VPI	W 74–66	1–0	Greensboro Coliseum; Greensboro, NC
December 6, 1967*		at Michigan	W 93–72	2–0	
December 9, 1967*		at Alabama	W 86–80	3–0	
December 13, 1967		Virginia	W 103–61	4–0	Duke Indoor Stadium; Durham, NC
December 16, 1967*		at No. 3 Vanderbilt	L 75–76	4–1	
December 19, 1967*		Princeton	W 85–79	5–1	Duke Indoor Stadium; Durham, NC
December 30, 1967		vs. Wake Forest	W 103–76	6–1	Greensboro Coliseum; Greensboro, NC
January 3, 1968*		Davidson	W 89–84	7–1	Duke Indoor Stadium; Durham, NC
January 6, 1968		at No. 3 North Carolina	L 72–75	7–2	
January 9, 1968		Clemson	W 101–79	8–2	Duke Indoor Stadium; Durham, N.C.
January 13, 1968		at Maryland	W 84–52	9–2	
January 27, 1968		NC State	W 82–76	10–2	Duke Indoor Stadium; Durham, NC
January 30, 1968	No. 9	at South Carolina	L 80–83	10–3	
February 1, 1968	No. 9	at Virginia	W 90–78	11–3	
February 6, 1968		Maryland	W 85–64	12–3	Duke Indoor Stadium; Durham, NC
February 8, 1968*		vs. Southern Illinois	W 78–54	13–3	Madison Square Garden; New York, NY
February 10, 1968*		vs. Notre Dame	W 73–67	14–3	Chicago Stadium; Chicago, IL
February 14, 1968	No. 10	Wake Forest	W 105–65	15–3	Duke Indoor Stadium; Durham, NC
February 17, 1968*	No. 10	Temple	W 92–57	16–3	Duke Indoor Stadium; Durham, NC
February 20, 1968	No. 8	at Clemson	W 82–70	17–3	
February 22, 1968	No. 8	at Wake Forest	W 50–41	18–3	
February 24, 1968	No. 8	South Carolina	L 50–56	18–4	Duke Indoor Stadium; Durham, N.C.
February 28, 1968	No. 10	at NC State	W 71–61	19–4	
March 2, 1968	No. 10	No. 3 North Carolina	W 87–86 ^{3OT}	20–4	Duke Indoor Stadium; Durham, N.C.
ACC tournament
March 7, 1968	No. 6	vs. Clemson; ACC Quarterfinal	W 43–40	21–4	Charlotte Coliseum; Charlotte, NC
March 8, 1968	No. 6	vs. NC State; ACC Semifinal	L 10–12	21–5	Charlotte Coliseum; Charlotte, N.C.
NIT
March 14, 1968*	No. 10	vs. Oklahoma City; NIT First Round	W 97–81	22–5	Madison Square Garden; New York, NY
March 18, 1968*	No. 10	vs. St. Peter's; NIT Quarterfinal	L 71–100	22–6	Madison Square Garden; New York, NY
*Non-conference game. ^{#}Rankings from AP Poll. (#) Tournament seedings in parentheses. Source: Duke media guide
