= 1961–62 North Carolina Tar Heels men's basketball team =

American college basketball season

1961–62 North Carolina Tar Heels men's basketball
- Conference: Atlantic Coast Conference
- Record: 8–9 (7–7 ACC)
- Head coach: Dean Smith (1st season)
- Assistant coach: Ken Rosemond
- Home arena: Woollen Gymnasium

1961–62 ACC men's basketball standings
	Conf.				Overall
Team	W		L	PCT	W		L	PCT
Wake Forest †	12	–	2	.857	22	–	9	.710
No. 10 Duke	11	–	3	.786	20	–	5	.800
NC State	10	–	4	.714	11	–	6	.647
North Carolina	7	–	7	.500	8	–	9	.471
South Carolina	7	–	7	.500	15	–	12	.556
Clemson	4	–	10	.286	12	–	15	.444
Maryland	3	–	11	.214	8	–	17	.320
Virginia	2	–	12	.143	5	–	18	.217
† 1962 ACC tournament winner Rankings from AP Poll

The 1961–62 North Carolina Tar Heels men's basketball team was Dean Smith's first as the head coach at North Carolina. The 1961–62 team finished with an 8–9 overall record, despite a young and inexperienced roster. They tied for fourth in the Atlantic Coast Conference with a 7–7 record. Their season ended with a first round loss in the ACC Tournament to South Carolina. This was Dean Smith's only losing season as a head coach at North Carolina.

== Roster ==
Name	Height	Year	Hometown
Bruce Bowers	6–8	Sophomore	Wellesley Hills, MA
Larry Brown	5–11	Junior	Long Beach, NY
Charlie Burns	6–2	Junior	Wadesboro, NC
Peppy Callahan	6–2	Junior	Smithtown, NY
Mike Cooke	6–2	Sophomore	Mt. Airy, NC
Jim Donohue	6–8	Senior	Yonkers, NY
Jim Hudock	6–7	Senior	Tunkhannock, PA
Harry Jones	6–7	Senior	Charlotte, NC
Art Katz	6–7	Sophomore	Williston Park, NY
Dieter Krause	6–5	Junior	Norfolk, VA
Bryan McSweeney	6–5	Sophomore	Hewlett, NY
Charlie Shaffer	6–3	Sophomore	Chapel Hill, NC
Richard Vinroot	6–7	Sophomore	Charlotte, NC
Donnie Walsh	6–0	Senior	Riverdale, NY

== Pre Season ==
At the conclusion of the 1960–61 season, North Carolina, hired Dean Smith to replace Frank McGuire as head coach. McGuire was North Carolina Men's basketball Head Coach from 1953 to 1961, but was forced to resign by Chancellor William Aycock due to the program's placement on NCAA probation in 1960. Aycock, however, hired Smith, one of McGuire's assistants and who had been at North Carolina for two seasons already. Smith, who was only 30 at the time, was instructed by Aycock to run a clean program and represent the University well. Wins and losses were an afterthought to the Chancellor. However, in Smith's first season he was faced with a number of challenges, including a limited game schedule and the loss of two key players.

Prior to the start of the 1961 season, the ACC experienced a point shaving scandal. Four N.C. State players were accused of altering the score of several games and one UNC player was found to be involved with a gambler. As a result of this, the Dixie Classic was abolished and William Friday, the President of the University of North Carolina system, also de-emphasized basketball by allowing only sixteen regular season games. Therefore, Smith was limited to only two games against out of conference opponents. Smith kept the two most challenging opponents on the schedule, Notre Dame and Indiana, both games which would be played in North Carolina, one in Greensboro and the other in Charlotte, respectively.

The 1961–62 squad should have included Ken McComb and Yogi Poteet, both projected starters, but they were ruled academically ineligible before the season started. This was a big blow for the Tar Heels since they also had to withstand the loss of two All-Americans, Doug Moe and York Larese, to graduation. As a result, Smith's first team was young and inexperienced.

== Season summary ==
Dean Smith's illustrious career started on December 2, 1961, with a victory against Virginia in Chapel Hill. The Heels and Smith rolled to their first victory, defeating the Cavaliers 80–46. UNC won their next game at Clemson by a narrow margin, 54–52. They split their next two games against out-of-conference opponents, Indiana and Notre Dame. Despite the betting odds in Notre Dame's favor, the Heels dominated the Fighting Irish, 99–80. Through January, the Heels had an accumulated a 6–2 record, but the rest of the season was not as successful. In February, they lost four straight games, all to Tobacco Road opponents (Duke, Wake Forest, and North Carolina State), before rebounding to win two of their last four games, with victories against Clemson and Maryland. Their season ended with a two-point loss to South Carolina in the ACC Tournament, which placed the Heels in a tie for fourth place with South Carolina in the final ACC standings.

Junior guard Larry Brown and senior center Jim Hudock led the Heels to an 8–9 overall record and a 7–7 ACC record. Brown averaged 16.5 points per game, eighth in the league, and shot 79.5% from the foul line, third in the league. Hudock averaged a double double over the season, with 14.9 points per game and 10.3 rebounds per game, fourth in the league. Both were named to the All-ACC Second team. Donnie Walsh led the ACC in field-goal percentage for the season, shooting 55.9% from the field.

Despite the challenges faced by Smith's first squad, he credits them as being one of the most hard-working teams in his 36 seasons at North Carolina. They also set North Carolina single-season record for highest field-goal percentage. However, they were the least successful, setting a record for most regular-season conference losses in a single-season (7) and their record against Tobacco Road opponents was only (1–5).

== Post Season ==
Jim Hudock was drafted in the sixth round of the NBA by the Philadelphia Warriors, which ironically was coached by former North Carolina head coach, Frank McGuire. Donnie Walsh and former Tar Heel, Ken McComb were also drafted by the Warriors in the 11th and 10th round respectively. These former Tar Heels went on to enjoy limited success as players in the NBA. However, Donnie Walsh went on to enjoy various coaching stints in the NCAA and the NBA, before becoming the general manager of the Indiana Pacers for over two decades. After a brief stint as President of the New York Knicks, Walsh returned to Indiana and now serves as a consultant for the team.

After Smith's first season, Adolph Rupp, Kentucky's head coach, called him requesting to set up a ten-year home-and-home series with UNC. Rupp demanded that North Carolina would play at Kentucky six times and home only four times. Despite North Carolina's disadvantage, the Heels won seven of those ten games.

== Schedule and results ==
Date time, TV	Rank^{#}	Opponent^{#}	Result	Record	Site city, state
December 2		Virginia	W 80–46	1–0 (1–0)	Woollen Gymnasium; Chapel Hill, NC
December 5		at Clemson	W 54–52	2–0 (2–0)	Clemson, SC
December 11*		Indiana	L 70–76	2–1	Greensboro, NC
January 6*		Notre Dame	W 99–80	3–1	Charlotte, NC
January 10		at Wake Forest	L 72–91	3–2 (2–1)	Winston-Salem, NC
January 13		vs. Virginia	W 100–71	4–2 (3–1)	Greensboro, NC
January 15		South Carolina	W 81–73	5–2 (4–1)	Woollen Gymnasium; Chapel Hill, NC
January 17		NC State	W 66–56	6–2 (5–1)	Woollen Gymnasium; Chapel Hill, NC
February 3		at No. 6 Duke; Rivalry	L 57–79	6–3 (5–2)	Cameron Indoor Stadium; Durham, NC
February 6		at Maryland	L 62–79	6–4 (5–3)	College Park, MD
February 10		Wake Forest	L 80–87	6–5 (5–4)	Woollen Gymnasium; Chapel Hill, NC
February 14		at NC State	L 57–85	6–6 (5–5)	Raleigh, NC
February 16		vs. Clemson; North-South Doubleheader	W 69–59	7–6 (6–5)	Charlotte, NC
February 17		vs. South Carolina; North-South Doubleheader	L 82–97	7–7 (6–6)	Charlotte, NC
February 19		Maryland	W 70–67	8–7 (7–6)	Woollen Gymnasium; Chapel Hill, NC
February 24		No. 8 Duke	L 74–82	8–8 (7–7)	Woollen Gymnasium; Chapel Hill, NC
March 1*		vs. South Carolina; ACC tournament	L 55–57	8–9	Raleigh, NC
*Non-conference game. ^{#}Rankings from AP Poll. (#) Tournament seedings in parentheses.

== Season Statistics ==
Player	GP	FGM	FGA	Pct.	FTM	FTA	Pct.	Pts.	Avg.	Hi
Larry Brown	17	90	204	0.441	101	127	0.795	281	16.5	26
Jim Hudock	17	98	215	0.456	57	89	0.640	253	14.9	26
Donnie Walsh	17	85	152	0.559	57	95	0.600	227	13.4	22
Bryan McSweeney	17	43	91	0.473	41	60	0.683	127	7.5	22
Mike Cooke	17	41	106	0.387	17	27	0.630	99	5.8	13
Charlie Shaffer	9	35	55	0.636	24	36	0.667	94	10.4	25
Jim Donohue	14	31	74	0.419	13	20	0.650	75	5.4	14
Dieter Krause	10	16	28	0.571	9	21	0.429	41	4.1	11
Art Katz	11	3	7	0.429	6	8	0.750	12	1.1	6
Charlie Burns	8	6	8	0.750	0	0	0.000	12	1.5	6
Peppy Callahan	9	1	10	0.100	4	7	0.571	6	0.7	3
Harry Jones	5	1	8	0.125	0	1	0.000	2	0.4	2
Richard Vinroot	5	0	1	0.000	1	4	0.250	1	0.2	1
Totals	17	450	959	0.469	330	495	0.667	1230	72.4	–
