= 1967–68 North Carolina Tar Heels men's basketball team =

American college basketball season

1967–68 North Carolina Tar Heels men's basketball

NCAA tournament, runner-up ACC Tournament champions ACC regular season champions

National Championship Game, L 55-78 vs. UCLA
- Conference: Atlantic Coast Conference

Ranking
- Coaches: No. 4
- AP: No. 4
- Record: 28–4 (12–2 ACC)
- Head coach: Dean Smith (7th season)
- Assistant coach: Bill Guthridge (1st season)
- Home arena: Carmichael Auditorium

1967–68 ACC men's basketball standings
	Conf.				Overall
Team	W		L	PCT	W		L	PCT
No. 4 North Carolina †	12	–	2	.857	28	–	4	.875
No. 10 Duke	11	–	3	.786	22	–	6	.786
NC State	9	–	5	.643	16	–	10	.615
South Carolina	9	–	5	.643	15	–	7	.682
Virginia	5	–	9	.357	9	–	16	.360
Maryland	4	–	10	.286	8	–	16	.333
Clemson	3	–	11	.214	4	–	20	.167
Wake Forest	3	–	11	.214	5	–	21	.192
† 1968 ACC tournament winner Rankings from AP Poll

The 1967–68 North Carolina Tar Heels men's basketball team represented the University of North Carolina at Chapel Hill during the 1967–68 men's college basketball season.

== Schedule ==
Date time, TV	Rank^{#}	Opponent^{#}	Result	Record	Site city, state
December 2*	No. 4	Virginia Tech	W 89–76		Carmichael Auditorium; Chapel Hill, NC
December 6*	No. 5	Kent	W 107–83		Carmichael Auditorium; Chapel Hill, NC
December 9*	No. 5	at No. 8 Vanderbilt	L 76–89		Nashville, TN
December 12*	No. 5	vs. No. 4 Kentucky; Rivalry	W 84–77		Greensboro, NC
December 16*	No. 7	No. 10 Princeton	W 71–63		Greensboro, NC
December 28*	No. 5	vs. Stanford; Far West Classic	W 87–78		Portland, OR
December 29*	No. 5	vs. No. 7 Utah; Far West Classic	W 86–64		Portland, OR
December 30*	No. 5	vs. Oregon State; Far West Classic	W 68–61		Portland, OR
January 3	No. 3	Wake Forest	W 74–62		Carmichael Auditorium; Chapel Hill, NC
January 6	No. 3	Duke; Rivalry	W 75–72		Carmichael Auditorium; Chapel Hill, NC
January 10	No. 3	at NC State; Rivalry	W 68–66		Raleigh, NC
January 13	No. 3	at Clemson	W 115–83		Clemson, SC
January 27*	No. 3	vs. Georgia Tech	W 82–54		Charlotte, NC
February 1*	No. 3	Florida State	W 86–80		Carmichael Auditorium; Chapel Hill, NC
February 3	No. 3	at Maryland	W 73–67		College Park, MD
February 6	No. 3	Virginia	W 108–64		Carmichael Auditorium; Chapel Hill, NC
February 8	No. 3	at Wake Forest	W 80–60		Winston-Salem, NC
February 10*	No. 3	at Virginia Tech	W 80–70		Blacksburg, VA
February 12	No. 3	NC State	W 96–84		Carmichael Auditorium; Chapel Hill, NC
February 16	No. 3	vs. Clemson; North-South Doubleheader	W 96–74		Charlotte, NC
February 17	No. 3	vs. South Carolina; North-South Doubleheader	W 84–80		Charlotte, NC
February 21	No. 3	Maryland	W 83–60		Carmichael Auditorium; Chapel Hill, NC
February 24	No. 3	at Virginia	W 92–74		Charlottesville, VA
February 28	No. 3	South Carolina	L 86–87		Carmichael Auditorium; Chapel Hill, NC
March 2	No. 3	at No. 10 Duke	L 86–87 ^{3OT}		Cameron Indoor Stadium; Durham, NC
March 7*	No. 5	vs. Wake Forest; ACC tournament • Quarterfinals	W 83–70		Charlotte, NC
March 8*	No. 5	vs. South Carolina; ACC Tournament • Semifinals	W 82–79 ^{OT}		Charlotte, NC
March 9*	No. 5	vs. NC State; ACC Tournament • Final	W 87–50		Charlotte, NC
March 15*	No. 4	No. 3 St. Bonaventure; NCAA tournament • Regional semifinals	W 91–72		Reynolds Coliseum; Raleigh, NC
March 16*	No. 4	vs. No. 8 Davidson; NCAA Tournament • Regional Final	W 70–66		Reynolds Coliseum; Raleigh, NC
March 22*	No. 4	vs. Ohio State; NCAA Tournament • National semifinals	W 80–66		Los Angeles Sports Arena; Los Angeles, CA
March 23*	No. 4	vs. No. 2 UCLA; NCAA Tournament • National Final	L 55–78	28–4	Los Angeles Sports Arena; Los Angeles, CA
*Non-conference game. ^{#}Rankings from AP Poll. (#) Tournament seedings in parentheses. E=East. All times are in Eastern Time.
