= 1967–68 NC State Wolfpack men's basketball team =

American college basketball season

1967–68 NC State Wolfpack men's basketball
- Conference: Atlantic Coast Conference
- Record: 16–10 (9–5 ACC)
- Head coach: Norm Sloan (2nd season)
- Captains: Eddie Biedenbach; Bill Kretzer
- Home arena: Reynolds Coliseum

1967–68 ACC men's basketball standings
	Conf.				Overall
Team	W		L	PCT	W		L	PCT
No. 4 North Carolina †	12	–	2	.857	28	–	4	.875
No. 10 Duke	11	–	3	.786	22	–	6	.786
NC State	9	–	5	.643	16	–	10	.615
South Carolina	9	–	5	.643	15	–	7	.682
Virginia	5	–	9	.357	9	–	16	.360
Maryland	4	–	10	.286	8	–	16	.333
Clemson	3	–	11	.214	4	–	20	.167
Wake Forest	3	–	11	.214	5	–	21	.192
† 1968 ACC tournament winner Rankings from AP Poll

The 1967–68 NC State Wolfpack men's basketball team represented North Carolina State University during the 1967–68 NCAA men's basketball season.

== Schedule ==
Date time, TV	Rank^{#}	Opponent^{#}	Result	Record	Site city, state
December 2		at Wake Forest	W 79–63	1–0 (1–0)	Winston-Salem, NC
December 6		at Maryland	W 75–62	2–0 (2–0)	College Park, MD
December 13*		William & Mary	W 88–73	3–0	Reynolds Coliseum; Raleigh, NC
December 16*		No. 9 Indiana	L 97–101	3–1	Reynolds Coliseum; Raleigh, NC
December 20*		vs. No. 8 Boston College; Boston Garden Invitational	L 55–72	3–2	Boston Garden; Boston, MA
December 21*		vs. La Salle; Boston Garden Invitational	L 63–68	3–3	Boston Garden; Boston, MA
December 28*		Army; Triangle Classic	W 75–60	4–3	Reynolds Coliseum; Raleigh, NC
December 29*		Georgia; Triangle Classic	L 56–62	4–4	Reynolds Coliseum; Raleigh, NC
January 2*		Atlantic Christian	W 111–52	5–4	Reynolds Coliseum; Raleigh, NC
January 6		Maryland	W 68–52	6–4 (3–0)	Reynolds Coliseum; Raleigh, NC
January 10		No. 3 North Carolina	L 66–68	6–5 (3–1)	Reynolds Coliseum; Raleigh, NC
January 20*		East Carolina	W 83–67	7–5	Reynolds Coliseum; Raleigh, NC
January 22*		at Jacksonville	W 69–52	8–5	Jacksonville, FL
January 27		at Duke	L 76–82	8–6 (3–2)	Durham, NC
January 29		at Virginia	W 79–77	9–6 (4–2)	Charlottesville, VA
February 3		Clemson	W 78–66	10–6 (5–2)	Reynolds Coliseum; Raleigh, NC
February 12		at No. 3 North Carolina	L 84–96	11–7 (6–3)	Chapel Hill, NC
February 16		vs. South Carolina; North–South Doubleheader	W 72–59	12–7 (7–3)	Charlotte, NC
February 17		vs. Clemson; North–South Doubleheader	W 69–67	13–7 (8–3)	Charlotte, NC
February 24		Wake Forest	L 66–72	13–8 (8–4)	Reynolds Coliseum; Raleigh, NC
February 28		No. 10 Duke	L 61–71	13–9 (8–5)	Reynolds Coliseum; Raleigh, NC
March 2		at South Carolina	W 55–54	14–9 (9–5)	Reynolds Coliseum; Raleigh, NC
March 7*		vs. Maryland; ACC tournament	W 63–54	15–9	Charlotte, NC
March 8		vs. No. 6 Duke; ACC Tournament	W 12–10	16–9	Charlotte, NC
March 9*		vs. No. 5 North Carolina; ACC Tournament	L 50–87	16–10	Charlotte, NC
*Non-conference game. ^{#}Rankings from AP Poll. (#) Tournament seedings in parentheses.
