= 1961–62 Duke Blue Devils men's basketball team =

American college basketball season

1961–62 Duke Blue Devils men's basketball

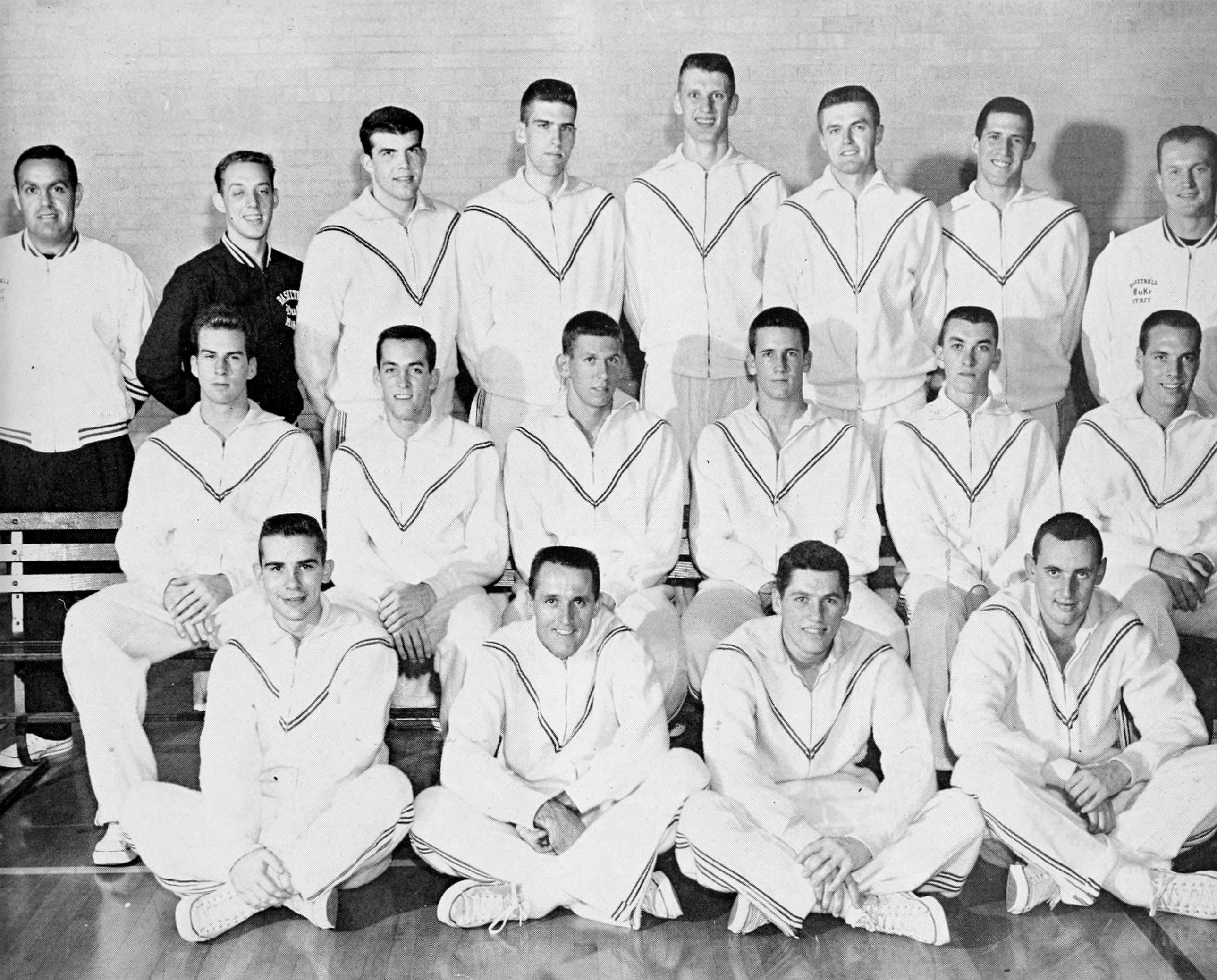
- Conference: Atlantic Coast Conference

Ranking
- Coaches: No. 13
- AP: No. 10
- Record: 20–5 (11–3 ACC)
- Head coach: Vic Bubas
- Assistant coach: Fred Shabel
- Home arena: Duke Indoor Stadium

1961–62 ACC men's basketball standings
	Conf.				Overall
Team	W		L	PCT	W		L	PCT
Wake Forest †	12	–	2	.857	22	–	9	.710
No. 10 Duke	11	–	3	.786	20	–	5	.800
NC State	10	–	4	.714	11	–	6	.647
North Carolina	7	–	7	.500	8	–	9	.471
South Carolina	7	–	7	.500	15	–	12	.556
Clemson	4	–	10	.286	12	–	15	.444
Maryland	3	–	11	.214	8	–	17	.320
Virginia	2	–	12	.143	5	–	18	.217
† 1962 ACC tournament winner Rankings from AP Poll

The 1961–62 Duke Blue Devils men's basketball team represented Duke University in the 1961–62 NCAA Division I men's basketball season. The head coach was Vic Bubas and the team finished the season with an overall record of 20–5.
