= 1968 ACC men's basketball tournament =

- Classification: Division I
- Season: 1967–68
- Teams: 8
- Site: Charlotte Coliseum; Charlotte, North Carolina
- Champions: North Carolina (3rd title)
- Winning coach: Dean Smith (2nd title)
- MVP: Larry Miller (North Carolina)

1967–68 ACC men's basketball standings
	Conf.				Overall
Team	W		L	PCT	W		L	PCT
No. 4 North Carolina †	12	–	2	.857	28	–	4	.875
No. 10 Duke	11	–	3	.786	22	–	6	.786
NC State	9	–	5	.643	16	–	10	.615
South Carolina	9	–	5	.643	15	–	7	.682
Virginia	5	–	9	.357	9	–	16	.360
Maryland	4	–	10	.286	8	–	16	.333
Clemson	3	–	11	.214	4	–	20	.167
Wake Forest	3	–	11	.214	5	–	21	.192
† 1968 ACC tournament winner Rankings from AP Poll

The 1968 Atlantic Coast Conference men's basketball tournament was held in Charlotte, North Carolina, at the original Charlotte Coliseum from March 7–9, 1968. North Carolina defeated NC State, 87–50, to win the championship. Larry Miller of North Carolina was named tournament MVP. NC State's 12–10 victory over Duke in the semifinals was the lowest-scoring game in ACC Tournament history. This was the first ACC Tournament held in Charlotte.

== Bracket ==
Quarterfinals; March 7
1	#5 North Carolina	83
8	Wake Forest	70
4	South Carolina	101
5	Virginia	78
2	#6 Duke	43
7	Clemson	40
3	NC State	63
6	Maryland	54

Semifinals; March 8
1	#5 North Carolina	82^{OT}
4	South Carolina	79
2	#6 Duke	10
3	NC State	12

Championship Game; March 9
1	#5 North Carolina	87
3	NC State	50
