= 1968 NCAA University Division basketball championship game =

1968 NCAA Tournament Championship Game
National championship game
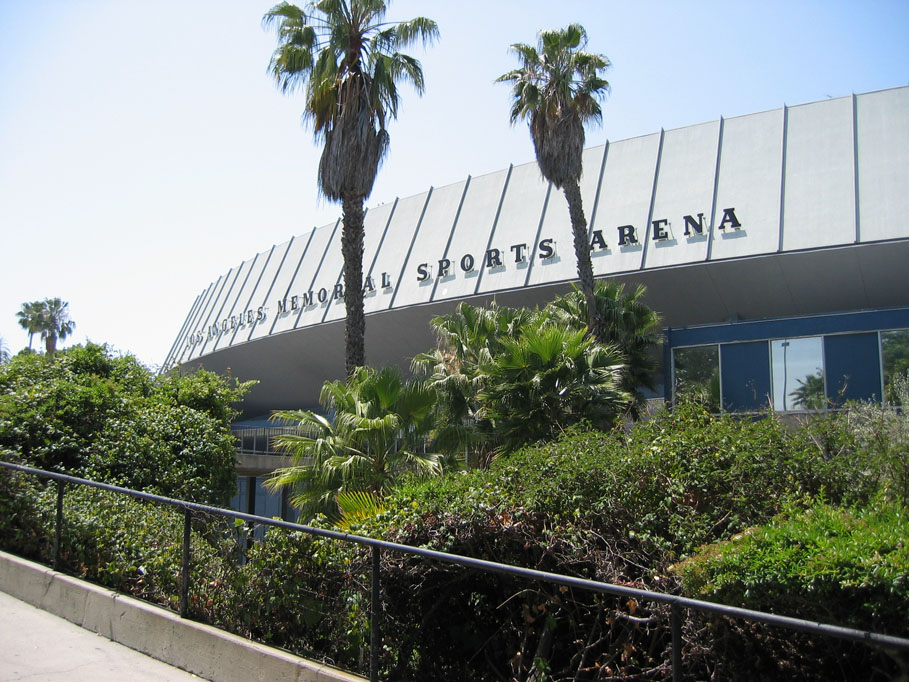
- The Sports Arena in Los Angeles, California, hosted the championship game.
North Carolina Tar Heels	UCLA Bruins
ACC	Pac-8
(28-3)	(28-1)
55	78
Head coach: Dean Smith	Head coach: John Wooden
- AP: 4
- Coaches: 4
- AP: 2
- Coaches: 2
	1st half	2nd half	Total
North Carolina Tar Heels	22	33	55
UCLA Bruins	32	46	78
- Date: March 23, 1968
- Venue: Los Angeles Memorial Sports Arena, Los Angeles, California
- MVP: Kareem Abdul-Jabbar, UCLA
- Referees: Charles Fouty & Steve Honzo

United States TV coverage
- Network: Sports Network Incorporated
- Announcers: Frank Sims and Bill Flemming

The 1968 NCAA University Division Basketball Championship Game took place on March 23, 1968, between the North Carolina Tar Heels and the defending national champion UCLA Bruins at the Sports Arena in Los Angeles. The matchup was the final one of the thirtieth edition of the single-elimination tournament now known as the NCAA Division I men's basketball tournament – commonly referred to as the NCAA Tournament – organized by the National Collegiate Athletic Association (NCAA). It was used to crown a national champion for men's basketball in the NCAA's University Division, the predecessor to what has been known since 1973 as NCAA Division I.

The Bruins handily defeated the Tar Heels to win their second of seven consecutive national championships.

== Box score ==
Sports Network Inc.

March 23, 1968

#2 UCLA Bruins 78, #4 North Carolina Tar Heels 55
Scoring by half: 32-22, 46-33
Pts: Lew Alcindor 34; Rebs: Lew Alcindor 16; Asts: Lucius Allen 5	Pts: Larry Miller 14; Rebs: Rusty Clark 6 Asts: Larry Miller 3

Sports Arena, Los Angeles, California
Referees: Charles Fouty & Steve Honzo
