= 1960–61 Duke Blue Devils men's basketball team =

American college basketball season

1960–61 Duke Blue Devils men's basketball

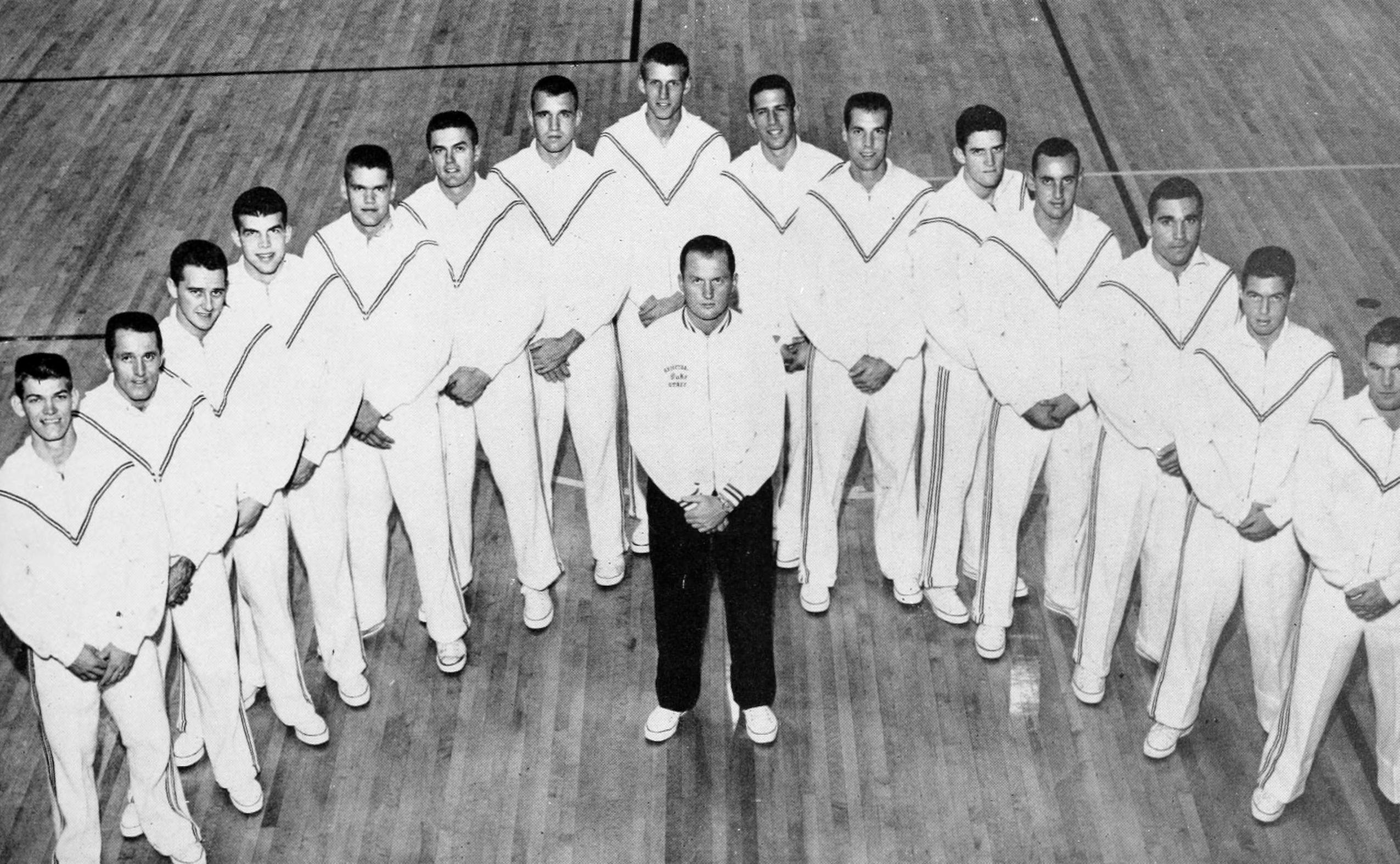
- Conference: Atlantic Coast Conference

Ranking
- Coaches: No. 9
- AP: No. 10
- Record: 22–6 (10–4 ACC)
- Head coach: Vic Bubas
- Assistant coach: Fred Shabel
- Home arena: Duke Indoor Stadium

1960–61 ACC men's basketball standings
	Conf.				Overall
Team	W		L	PCT	W		L	PCT
No. 5 North Carolina	12	–	2	.857	19	–	4	.826
Wake Forest †	11	–	3	.786	19	–	11	.633
No. 10 Duke	10	–	4	.714	22	–	6	.786
NC State	8	–	6	.571	16	–	9	.640
Maryland	6	–	8	.429	14	–	12	.538
Clemson	5	–	9	.357	10	–	16	.385
South Carolina	2	–	12	.143	9	–	17	.346
Virginia	2	–	12	.143	3	–	23	.115
† 1961 ACC tournament winner Rankings from AP Poll

The 1960–61 Duke Blue Devils men's basketball team represented Duke University in the 1960–61 NCAA University Division men's basketball season. The head coach was Vic Bubas and the team finished the season with an overall record of 22–6.
