= 1969 ACC men's basketball tournament =

- Classification: Division I
- Season: 1968–69
- Teams: 8
- Site: Charlotte Coliseum; Charlotte, North Carolina
- Champions: North Carolina (4th title)
- Winning coach: Dean Smith (3rd title)
- MVP: Charlie Scott (North Carolina)

1968–69 ACC men's basketball standings
	Conf.				Overall
Team	W		L	PCT	W		L	PCT
No. 4 North Carolina †	12	–	2	.857	27	–	5	.844
No. 13 South Carolina	11	–	3	.786	21	–	7	.750
Duke	8	–	6	.571	15	–	13	.536
NC State	8	–	6	.571	15	–	10	.600
Wake Forest	8	–	6	.571	18	–	9	.667
Virginia	5	–	9	.357	10	–	15	.400
Maryland	2	–	12	.143	8	–	18	.308
Clemson	2	–	12	.143	6	–	19	.240
† 1969 ACC tournament winner Rankings from AP Poll

The 1969 Atlantic Coast Conference men's basketball tournament was held in Charlotte, North Carolina, at the original Charlotte Coliseum from March 6–8, 1969. North Carolina defeated Duke, 85–74, to win the championship. Charlie Scott of North Carolina was named tournament MVP.

== Bracket ==
Quarterfinals; March 6
1	#2 North Carolina	94
8	Clemson	70
4	NC State	73
5	Wake Forest	81
2	#8 South Carolina	92
7	Maryland	71
3	Duke	99
6	Virginia	86

Semifinals; March 7
1	#2 North Carolina	80
5	Wake Forest	72
2	#8 South Carolina	59
3	Duke	68

Championship Game; March 8
1	#2 North Carolina	85
3	Duke	74
