= 1962 ACC men's basketball tournament =

- Classification: Division I
- Season: 1961–62
- Teams: 8
- Site: Reynolds Coliseum; Raleigh, North Carolina
- Champions: Wake Forest (2nd title)
- Winning coach: Bones McKinney (2nd title)
- MVP: Len Chappell (Wake Forest)

1961–62 ACC men's basketball standings
	Conf.				Overall
Team	W		L	PCT	W		L	PCT
Wake Forest †	12	–	2	.857	22	–	9	.710
No. 10 Duke	11	–	3	.786	20	–	5	.800
NC State	10	–	4	.714	11	–	6	.647
North Carolina	7	–	7	.500	8	–	9	.471
South Carolina	7	–	7	.500	15	–	12	.556
Clemson	4	–	10	.286	12	–	15	.444
Maryland	3	–	11	.214	8	–	17	.320
Virginia	2	–	12	.143	5	–	18	.217
† 1962 ACC tournament winner Rankings from AP Poll

The 1962 Atlantic Coast Conference men's basketball tournament was held in Raleigh, North Carolina, at Reynolds Coliseum from March 1–3, 1962. Wake Forest defeated Clemson, 77–66, to win the championship for the second consecutive year. Len Chappell of Wake Forest was named tournament MVP.

== Bracket ==
Quarterfinals; March 1
1	Wake Forest	81
8	Virginia	58
4	North Carolina	55
5	South Carolina	57
2	#8 Duke	71
7	Maryland	58
3	NC State	46
6	Clemson	67

Semifinals; March 2
1	Wake Forest	88
5	South Carolina	75
2	#8 Duke	72
6	Clemson	77

Championship Game; March 3
1	Wake Forest	77
6	Clemson	66
