= 1968–69 North Carolina Tar Heels men's basketball team =

American college basketball season

1968–69 North Carolina Tar Heels men's basketball

ACC Tournament Champions ACC Regular Season Champions

NCAA tournament, National Consolation Game
- Conference: Atlantic Coast Conference

Ranking
- Coaches: No. 2
- AP: No. 4
- Record: 27–5 (12–2 ACC)
- Head coach: Dean Smith (8th season)
- Assistant coach: Bill Guthridge (2nd season)
- Home arena: Carmichael Auditorium

1968–69 ACC men's basketball standings
	Conf.				Overall
Team	W		L	PCT	W		L	PCT
No. 4 North Carolina †	12	–	2	.857	27	–	5	.844
No. 13 South Carolina	11	–	3	.786	21	–	7	.750
Duke	8	–	6	.571	15	–	13	.536
NC State	8	–	6	.571	15	–	10	.600
Wake Forest	8	–	6	.571	18	–	9	.667
Virginia	5	–	9	.357	10	–	15	.400
Maryland	2	–	12	.143	8	–	18	.308
Clemson	2	–	12	.143	6	–	19	.240
† 1969 ACC tournament winner Rankings from AP Poll

The 1968–69 North Carolina Tar Heels men's basketball team represented the University of North Carolina at Chapel Hill during the 1968–69 men's college basketball season.

== Schedule ==
Date time, TV	Rank^{#}	Opponent^{#}	Result	Record	Site city, state
December 2*	No. 2	vs. Oregon	W 89–78		Greensboro, NC
December 3*	No. 2	Oregon	W 106–73		Carmichael Auditorium; Chapel Hill, NC
December 7*	No. 2	at No. 3 Kentucky; Rivalry	W 87–77		Lexington, KY
December 9*	No. 2	vs. No. 12 Vanderbilt	W 100–78		Charlotte, NC
December 16	No. 2	Clemson	W 90–69		Carmichael Auditorium; Chapel Hill, NC
December 17	No. 2	Virginia	W 94–67		Carmichael Auditorium; Chapel Hill, NC
December 27*	No. 2	vs. No. 8 Villanova; ECAC Holiday Festival	W 69–61		Madison Square Garden; New York, NY
December 28*	No. 2	vs. St. John's; ECAC Holiday Festival	L 70–72		Madison Square Garden; New York, NY
December 30*	No. 2	vs. Princeton; ECAC Holiday Festival	W 103–76		Madison Square Garden; New York, NY
January 4	No. 4	Duke; Rivalry	W 94–70		Carmichael Auditorium; Chapel Hill, NC
January 8	No. 2	NC State; Rivalry	W 83–63		Carmichael Auditorium; Chapel Hill, NC
January 11*	No. 2	Virginia Tech	W 99–77		Carmichael Auditorium; Chapel Hill, NC
January 14*	No. 2	at Georgia Tech	W 101–70		Atlanta, GA
February 1	No. 2	Maryland	W 107–87		Carmichael Auditorium; Chapel Hill, NC
January 18	No. 2	at Wake Forest	W 94–89		Winston-Salem, NC
February 1	No. 2	Maryland	W 107–87		Carmichael Auditorium; Chapel Hill, NC
February 4	No. 2	at Virginia	W 99–76		Charlottesville, VA
February 6	No. 2	Wake Forest	W 84–76		Carmichael Auditorium; Chapel Hill, NC
February 8*		vs. Florida State	W 100–82		Greensboro, NC
February 10	No. 2	at NC State	W 85–62		Raleigh, NC
February 14	No. 2	vs. South Carolina; North-South Doubleheader	L 66–68		Charlotte, NC
February 15	No. 2	vs. Clemson; North-South Doubleheader	W 107–81		Charlotte, NC
February 19	No. 3	at Maryland	W 88–86		College Park, MD
February 22*	No. 3	The Citadel	W 106–59		Carmichael Auditorium; Chapel Hill, NC
February 26	No. 2	at No. 8 South Carolina	W 68–62		Columbia, SC
March 1	No. 2	at Duke	L 81–87		Cameron Indoor Stadium; Durham, NC
March 6*	No. 4	vs. Clemson; ACC tournament	W 94–70		Charlotte, NC
March 7*	No. 4	vs. Wake Forest; ACC Tournament	W 80–72		Charlotte, NC
March 8*	No. 4	vs. Duke; ACC Tournament	W 85–74		Charlotte, NC
March 13*	No. 4	vs. No. 9 Duquesne; NCAA tournament	W 79–78		Cole Fieldhouse; College Park, MD
March 15*	No. 4	vs. No. 5 Davidson; NCAA Tournament	W 87–85		Cole Fieldhouse; College Park, MD
March 20*	No. 4	vs. No. 6 Purdue; NCAA Tournament	L 65–92		Louisville, KY
March 22*	No. 4	vs. No. 11 Drake; NCAA Tournament	L 84–104		Louisville, KY
*Non-conference game. ^{#}Rankings from AP Poll. (#) Tournament seedings in parentheses. E=East.
