= 1964–65 New York Knicks season =

Season of National Basketball Association team the New York Knicks

- Head coach: Eddie Donovan; Harry Gallatin
- General manager: Fred Podesta; Eddie Donovan
- Arena: Madison Square Garden

Results
- Record: 31–49 (.388)
- Place: Division: 4th (Eastern)
- Playoff finish: Did not qualify
- Stats at Basketball Reference

Local media
- Television: WPIX
- Radio: WOR

The 1964–65 New York Knicks season was the Knicks' 19th season in the NBA.

== Roster ==
New York Knicks roster
Players

Pos.	No.	Player	Height	Weight	DOB	From
F	22	Jim Barnes	6 ft 8 in (2.03 m)	210 lb (95 kg)		UTEP
F	14	Bob Boozer	6 ft 8 in (2.03 m)	215 lb (98 kg)		Kansas State
G	7	Em Bryant	6 ft 1 in (1.85 m)	175 lb (79 kg)		DePaul
F	10	Dave Budd	6 ft 6 in (1.98 m)	205 lb (93 kg)		Wake Forest
C	24	Len Chappell	6 ft 8 in (2.03 m)	240 lb (109 kg)		Wake Forest
G	15	Johnny Egan	5 ft 11 in (1.80 m)	180 lb (82 kg)		Providence
G	6	Tom Gola	6 ft 6 in (1.98 m)	205 lb (93 kg)		La Salle
F	11	Johnny Green	6 ft 5 in (1.96 m)	200 lb (91 kg)		Michigan State
G	4	Art Heyman	6 ft 5 in (1.96 m)	205 lb (93 kg)		Duke
C	23	Tom Hoover	6 ft 9 in (2.06 m)	230 lb (104 kg)		Villanova
G	16	Howard Komives	6 ft 1 in (1.85 m)	185 lb (84 kg)		Bowling Green
F	21	Barry Kramer	6 ft 4 in (1.93 m)	200 lb (91 kg)		NYU
C	19	Willis Reed	6 ft 9 in (2.06 m)	235 lb (107 kg)		Grambling State
F	18	John Rudometkin	6 ft 6 in (1.98 m)	205 lb (93 kg)		USC

Coaches
Head coach
- Harry Gallatin (Truman)

Legend
- (DP) Unsigned draft pick
- (FA) Free agent
- (S) Suspended
- Injured

Roster

== Regular season ==
=== Season standings ===
Eastern Division	W	L	PCT	GB	Home	Road	Neutral	Div
x-Boston Celtics	62	18	.775	–	27–3	27–11	8–4	20–10
x-Cincinnati Royals	48	32	.600	14	25–7	17–21	6–4	16–14
x-Philadelphia 76ers	40	40	.500	22	13–12	9–21	18–7	14–16
New York Knicks	31	49	.388	31	15–20	9–21	7–8	10–20

x – clinched playoff spot

=== Game log ===
1964–65 game log
#	Date	Opponent	Score	High points	Record
1	October 17	Los Angeles	113–109	Johnny Green (20)	0–1
2	October 24	Detroit	118–108 (OT)	Willis Reed (20)	0–2
3	October 25	N Detroit	108–95	Komives, Reed (20)	1–2
4	October 27	Boston	131–103	Willis Reed (20)	1–3
5	October 30	Philadelphia	90–94	Len Chappell (24)	2–3
6	October 31	@ Philadelphia	105–116	Willis Reed (22)	2–4
7	November 5	@ Los Angeles	96–106	Jim Barnes (21)	2–5
8	November 6	@ San Francisco	127–133 (2OT)	Johnny Green (32)	2–6
9	November 8	@ San Francisco	121–130	Willis Reed (38)	2–7
10	November 10	@ Los Angeles	101–108	Jim Barnes (21)	2–8
11	November 12	Los Angeles	132–123 (OT)	Willis Reed (38)	2–9
12	November 14	Cincinnati	111–110	Howard Komives (29)	2–10
13	November 20	N Boston	120–127	Jim Barnes (28)	2–11
14	November 21	Baltimore	94–103	Howard Komives (20)	3–11
15	November 24	San Francisco	93–101	Willis Reed (25)	4–11
16	November 25	N Philadelphia	124–93	Bob Boozer (18)	4–12
17	November 28	St. Louis	91–106	Willis Reed (23)	5–12
18	November 29	@ Cincinnati	95–105	Boozer, Heyman (13)	5–13
19	December 1	Boston	117–113 (OT)	Johnny Green (32)	5–14
20	December 2	@ Boston	91–116	Johnny Green (26)	5–15
21	December 5	@ Detroit	100–110	Jim Barnes (24)	5–16
22	December 6	@ St. Louis	94–115	Jim Barnes (26)	5–17
23	December 8	Detroit	102–100	Johnny Egan (21)	5–18
24	December 9	@ Baltimore	111–90	Johnny Egan (26)	6–18
25	December 12	Philadelphia	106–133	Willis Reed (25)	7–18
26	December 13	N Philadelphia	121–115	Len Chappell (26)	7–19
27	December 15	San Francisco	134–132 (OT)	Johnny Egan (35)	7–20
28	December 16	N St. Louis	117–103	Barnes, Chappell (20)	7–21
29	December 17	N Boston	113–112	Willis Reed (22)	8–21
30	December 19	Cincinnati	133–105	Bob Boozer (19)	8–22
31	December 21	@ Los Angeles	113–125	Howard Komives (24)	8–23
32	December 22	N San Francisco	118–124	Willis Reed (25)	9–23
33	December 25	Baltimore	114–108	Willis Reed (26)	9–24
34	December 26	@ Baltimore	118–116	Jim Barnes (32)	10–24
35	December 27	St. Louis	99–89	Jim Barnes (21)	10–25
36	December 28	N Detroit	117–123	Bob Boozer (29)	10–26
37	December 30	N San Francisco	102–118	Johnny Green (33)	11–26
38	January 1	San Francisco	100–101	Jim Barnes (21)	12–26
39	January 5	Cincinnati	125–116 (OT)	Johnny Egan (26)	12–27
40	January 6	@ Cincinnati	102–116	Johnny Egan (23)	12–28
41	January 8	@ St. Louis	82–83	Willis Reed (18)	12–29
42	January 9	Detroit	118–115	Jim Barnes (23)	12–30
43	January 10	@ Baltimore	122–120 (OT)	Johnny Egan (23)	13–30
44	January 15	@ San Francisco	89–87	Boozer, Reed (15)	14–30
45	January 16	@ San Francisco	102–89	Art Heyman (23)	15–30
46	January 20	@ Los Angeles	103–119	Jim Barnes (28)	15–31
47	January 22	@ Los Angeles	107–117	Jim Barnes (25)	15–32
48	January 26	Los Angeles	111–99	Jim Barnes (17)	15–33
49	January 27	@ St. Louis	100–117	Bob Boozer (25)	15–34
50	January 29	N Detroit	106–99	Willis Reed (22)	16–34
51	January 30	Boston	97–90	Willis Reed (25)	16–35
52	January 31	@ Boston	95–123	Willis Reed (18)	16–36
53	February 2	San Francisco	102–113	Johnny Green (23)	17–36
54	February 3	N Philadelphia	116–95	Willis Reed (35)	17–37
55	February 5	@ Detroit	118–112 (OT)	Willis Reed (29)	18–37
56	February 6	Detroit	106–109	Jim Barnes (21)	19–37
57	February 9	St. Louis	108–103	Howard Komives (23)	19–38
58	February 10	N Cincinnati	115–112 (OT)	Johnny Green (27)	20–38
59	February 12	@ Boston	92–94 (OT)	Jim Barnes (23)	20–39
60	February 13	Boston	113–123	Bob Boozer (23)	21–39
61	February 16	N Baltimore	106–102	Howard Komives (25)	22–39
62	February 17	Los Angeles	118–98	Willis Reed (30)	22–40
63	February 20	N Philadelphia	111–92	Willis Reed (24)	22–41
64	February 21	Cincinnati	104–109	Willis Reed (22)	23–41
65	February 23	Philadelphia	104–132	Bob Boozer (25)	24–41
66	February 24	@ Baltimore	100–111	Howard Komives (17)	24–42
67	February 27	Baltimore	99–102	Bob Boozer (21)	25–42
68	February 28	N Cincinnati	117–126	Willis Reed (36)	25–43
69	March 2	St. Louis	99–98	Willis Reed (21)	25–44
70	March 5	Los Angeles	105–103	Willis Reed (46)	25–45
71	March 6	@ Detroit	96–93	Willis Reed (33)	26–45
72	March 7	@ St. Louis	106–132	Willis Reed (19)	26–46
73	March 9	Philadelphia	122–124 (OT)	Willis Reed (22)	27–46
74	March 10	@ Philadelphia	134–123	Howard Komives (26)	28–46
75	March 13	@ Baltimore	114–102	Willis Reed (31)	29–46
76	March 14	Cincinnati	113–103	Dave Budd (25)	29–47
77	March 16	@ Cincinnati	102–111	Willis Reed (25)	29–48
78	March 17	Boston	114–119	Willis Reed (28)	30–48
79	March 20	Baltimore	114–118	Bob Boozer (23)	31–48
80	March 21	@ St. Louis	103–112	Johnny Egan (18)	31–49

== Awards and records ==
- Willis Reed, NBA Rookie of the Year Award
- Willis Reed, NBA All-Rookie Team 1st Team
- Jim Barnes, NBA All-Rookie Team 1st Team
- Howard Komives, NBA All-Rookie Team 1st Team
