= 1968–69 South Carolina Gamecocks men's basketball team =

American college basketball season

1968–69 South Carolina Gamecocks men's basketball

NIT
- Conference: Atlantic Coast Conference

Ranking
- Coaches: No. 20
- AP: No. 13
- Record: 21–7 (11–3 ACC)
- Head coach: Frank McGuire (5th season)
- Home arena: Carolina Coliseum

1968–69 ACC men's basketball standings
	Conf.				Overall
Team	W		L	PCT	W		L	PCT
No. 4 North Carolina †	12	–	2	.857	27	–	5	.844
No. 13 South Carolina	11	–	3	.786	21	–	7	.750
Duke	8	–	6	.571	15	–	13	.536
NC State	8	–	6	.571	15	–	10	.600
Wake Forest	8	–	6	.571	18	–	9	.667
Virginia	5	–	9	.357	10	–	15	.400
Maryland	2	–	12	.143	8	–	18	.308
Clemson	2	–	12	.143	6	–	19	.240
† 1969 ACC tournament winner Rankings from AP Poll

The 1968–69 South Carolina Gamecocks men's basketball team represented the University of South Carolina during the 1968–69 men's college basketball . South Carolina finished 2nd in the ACC at 11–3 with a win over #2 ranked North Carolina. South Carolina finished the season ranked 13th in the AP poll.

== Roster ==
Name	Position	Height	Year	Stats
John Roche	Guard	6–3	Sophomore	23.6 Pts, 2.6 Reb
Tom Owens	Center	6–10	Sophomore	16.4 Pts, 13.0 Reb
Bill Walsh	Guard	6–0	Sophomore	12.7 Pts, 2.3 Reb
John Ribock	Forward	6–8	Sophomore	9.2 Pts, 9.4 Reb
Bobby Cremins	Guard	6–2	Junior	6.9 Pts, 8.1 Reb
Gene Spencer	Forward	6–8	Junior	1.6 Pts, 1.5 Reb
Charlie Vacca	Forward	6–3	Senior	1.6 Pts, 1.4 Reb
Corkey Carnevale	Guard	6–3	Junior	1.0 Pts, 0.4 Reb
Tommy Terry	Guard	6–2	Junior	0.9 Pts, 0.2 Reb
Hank Martin	Guard	5–9	Senior	0.5 Pts, 0.2 Reb
Dennis Powell	Center	6–0	Sophomore	0.5 Pts, 0.2 Reb

== Schedule ==
Date time, TV	Rank^{#}	Opponent^{#}	Result	Record	Site city, state
November 30*		Auburn	W 51–49	1-0	Carolina Coliseum; Columbia, SC
December 4		at Wake Forrest	W 68–63	2-0 (1-0)	Winston-Salem Memorial Coliseum; Winston-Salem, NC
December 7		Maryland	W 79-67	3-0 (2-0)	Carolina Coliseum; Columbia, SC
December 14		Virginia	L 70–86	3-1 (2-1)	University Hall; Charlottesville, VA
December 18*		East Carolina	W 75–61	4-1	Carolina Coliseum; Columbia, SC
December 20*		vs. No. 3 Davidson	L 55–62	4-2	Charlotte Coliseum; Charlotte, NC
December 27*		vs. Rhode Island	W 86–68	5-2	
December 28*		at Saint Joseph's	W 64–48	6-2	Hagan Arena; Philadelphia, PA
December 30*		at No. 17 LaSalle	W 62–59	7-2	The Spectrum; Philadelphia, PA
January 4		Clemson	W 77–62	8-2 (3-1)	Carolina Coliseum; Columbia, SC
January 8		at Maryland	W 69–67	9-2 (4-1)	Cole Fieldhouse; College Park, MD
January 28*	No. 18	at Florida State	L 76–87	10-3	Tully Gymnasium; Tallahassee, FL
February 1	No. 19	Duke	W 64–57	11-3 (5-1)	Carolina Coliseum; Columbia, SC
February 3	No. 19	Wake Forrest	W 73–62	12-3 (6-1)	Carolina Coliseum; Columbia, SC
February 5*		Furman	W 90–67	13-3	Carolina Coliseum; Columbia, SC
February 8		at Duke	W 82-72	14-3 (7-1)	Cameron Indoor Stadium; Durham, NC
February 10		at Clemson	W 106–79	15-3 (8-1)	Littlejohn Coliseum; Clemson, SC
February 14		vs. No. 2 North Carolina	W 68–66	16-3 (9-1)	
February 15		vs. North Carolina State	W 45–35	17-3 (10-1)	
February 19*	No. 12	Furman	W 63–53	18-3	Memorial Auditorium; Greenville, SC
February 22	No. 7	Virginia	W 86–70	19-3 (11-1)	Carolina Coliseum; Columbia, SC
February 26	No. 8	No. 2 North Carolina	L 62–68	19-4 (11-2)	Carolina Coliseum; Columbia, SC
March 1	No. 8	at NC State	L 64–67	19-5 (11-3)	Reynolds Coliseum; Raleigh, NC
March 6*	No. 8	vs. Maryland; ACC tournament	W 92–71	20-5	Charlotte Coliseum; Charlotte, NC
March 7*	No. 8	vs. Duke; ACC tournament	L 59–68	20-6	Charlotte Coliseum; Charlotte, NC
March 15*	No. 13	vs. Southern Illinois; NIT	W 72-63	21-6	Madison Square Garden; Manhattan, NY
March 28*	No. 13	vs. Army; NIT	L 45-59	21-7	Madison Square Garden; Manhattan, NY
*Non-conference game. ^{#}Rankings from AP Poll. (#) Tournament seedings in parentheses.

== Rankings ==
Ranking movements Legend: ██ Increase in ranking ██ Decrease in ranking — = Not ranked
	Week															
Poll	Pre	1	2	3	4	5	6	7	8	9	10	11	12	13	14	Final
AP	—	—	—	—	—	—	—	—	—	—	19	—	—	12	8	13
Coaches	—	—	—	—	—	—	—	—	—	—	—	18	12	12	16	20
