= 1963–64 New York Knicks season =

Season of National Basketball Association team the New York Knicks

- Head coach: Eddie Donovan
- General manager: Fred Podesta
- Arena: Madison Square Garden

Results
- Record: 22–58 (.275)
- Place: Division: 4th (Eastern)
- Playoff finish: Did not qualify
- Stats at Basketball Reference

Local media
- Television: WPIX
- Radio: WCBS

The 1963–64 New York Knicks season was the Knicks' 18th season in the NBA.

== Regular season ==
=== Season standings ===
Eastern Division	W	L	PCT	GB	Home	Road	Neutral	Div
x-Boston Celtics	59	21	.738	–	26–4	21–17	12–0	25–11
x-Cincinnati Royals	55	25	.688	4	26–7	18–18	11–0	27–9
x-Philadelphia 76ers	34	46	.425	25	18–12	12–22	4–12	13–23
New York Knicks	22	58	.275	37	10–25	8–27	4–6	7–29

x – clinched playoff spot

=== Game log ===
1963–64 game log
#	Date	Opponent	Score	High points	Record
1	October 17	Baltimore	115–113	Johnny Green (23)	0–1
2	October 19	@ Cincinnati	97–121	Richie Guerin (21)	0–2
3	October 22	Los Angeles	130–117	Art Heyman (24)	0–3
4	October 23	@ Baltimore	106–115	Tom Gola (19)	0–4
5	October 25	@ Philadelphia	136–112	Johnny Green (25)	1–4
6	October 26	Philadelphia	101–109	Len Chappell (21)	2–4
7	October 29	St. Louis	109–103 (OT)	Len Chappell (20)	2–5
8	October 30	@ St. Louis	104–121	Len Chappell (19)	2–6
9	November 2	Baltimore	105–123	Len Chappell (22)	3–6
10	November 6	@ Los Angeles	109–111	Art Heyman (22)	3–7
11	November 7	@ San Francisco	88–110	Butler, McGill (13)	3–8
12	November 9	@ San Francisco	89–84	Len Chappell (23)	4–8
13	November 10	@ Los Angeles	79–104	Len Chappell (23)	4–9
14	November 13	St. Louis	102–106	Bill McGill (28)	5–9
15	November 15	@ Boston	116–133	Bill McGill (33)	5–10
16	November 16	Cincinnati	114–122	Johnny Green (27)	6–10
17	November 19	Boston	126–98	Len Chappell (27)	6–11
18	November 20	@ Philadelphia	101–118	Art Heyman (20)	6–12
19	November 23	Detroit	99–108	Art Heyman (23)	7–12
20	November 26	Los Angeles	119–112	Bill McGill (41)	7–13
21	November 27	N San Francisco	118–89	Bill McGill (22)	7–14
22	November 29	@ Cincinnati	110–135	Johnny Green (22)	7–15
23	November 30	Philadelphia	132–125	Tom Gola (29)	7–16
24	December 3	San Francisco	116–108	Bill McGill (25)	7–17
25	December 4	@ Detroit	120–119	Len Chappell (30)	8–17
26	December 6	N Baltimore	102–116	Green, McGill (28)	8–18
27	December 7	Cincinnati	116–105	Johnny Green (25)	8–19
28	December 10	Boston	132–113	John Rudometkin (26)	8–20
29	December 11	@ Philadelphia	103–113	Johnny Green (18)	8–21
30	December 12	@ Cincinnati	102–112	Len Chappell (28)	8–22
31	December 14	Philadelphia	123–119	Len Chappell (34)	8–23
32	December 17	Detroit	107–103	Len Chappell (22)	8–24
33	December 18	@ Boston	111–133	Boozer, Chappell (23)	8–25
34	December 19	N Boston	140–143	Bob Boozer (25)	8–26
35	December 21	Boston	117–127	Bill McGill (31)	9–26
36	December 25	Los Angeles	134–126	Bill McGill (30)	9–27
37	December 26	@ St. Louis	111–107	Len Chappell (24)	10–27
38	December 29	@ Cincinnati	99–105	Johnny Green (17)	10–28
39	December 31	San Francisco	101–79	Len Chappell (15)	10–29
40	January 2	@ Baltimore	109–124	Johnny Green (21)	10–30
41	January 3	N Baltimore	120–118	Johnny Green (23)	11–30
42	January 4	Cincinnati	125–116	Bill McGill (32)	11–31
43	January 5	@ Philadelphia	142–118	Bob Boozer (26)	12–31
44	January 8	@ Los Angeles	118–136	Bill McGill (23)	12–32
45	January 9	@ San Francisco	97–112	Bob Boozer (20)	12–33
46	January 11	N Los Angeles	118–108	Len Chappell (23)	13–33
47	January 12	@ San Francisco	105–112	Johnny Green (23)	13–34
48	January 16	N Detroit	124–116	Johnny Green (26)	14–34
49	January 17	N Detroit	99–101	Johnny Egan (20)	14–35
50	January 19	@ Baltimore	109–107	Bob Boozer (23)	15–35
51	January 21	Cincinnati	139–124	Bob Boozer (25)	15–36
52	January 23	@ Baltimore	114–130	John Rudometkin (21)	15–37
53	January 25	Philadelphia	131–129	Bill McGill (29)	15–38
54	January 26	@ Boston	102–115	Bill McGill (18)	15–39
55	January 28	Boston	127–133	Bob Boozer (28)	16–39
56	January 29	@ St. Louis	105–104	Johnny Egan (26)	17–39
57	January 30	N Cincinnati	110–133	Johnny Egan (22)	17–40
58	February 1	San Francisco	125–106	Johnny Egan (20)	17–41
59	February 4	Baltimore	137–134 (OT)	Len Chappell (31)	17–42
60	February 6	@ Philadelphia	117–128	Al Butler (25)	17–43
61	February 7	@ Boston	112–133	Johnny Egan (28)	17–44
62	February 8	Boston	135–114	Bob Boozer (21)	17–45
63	February 11	@ St. Louis	103–125	Heyman, McGill (19)	17–46
64	February 14	@ Cincinnati	114–126	Bob Boozer (22)	17–47
65	February 15	Cincinnati	130–124	Art Heyman (29)	17–48
66	February 18	Los Angeles	117–118	Johnny Green (26)	18–48
67	February 19	N St. Louis	114–120	Art Heyman (33)	19–48
68	February 22	@ Detroit	125–119 (OT)	Len Chappell (26)	20–48
69	February 23	Philadelphia	114–105	Bob Boozer (26)	20–49
70	February 25	Boston	114–102	Bob Boozer (23)	20–50
71	February 28	N Detroit	110–112	Art Heyman (29)	20–51
72	February 29	San Francisco	136–110	Bill McGill (28)	20–52
73	March 3	Cincinnati	117–108	Bill McGill (24)	20–53
74	March 4	@ Baltimore	108–115	Bill McGill (23)	20–54
75	March 7	@ Philadelphia	115–130	Len Chappell (30)	20–55
76	March 8	Philadelphia	108–140	Len Chappell (27)	21–55
77	March 10	St. Louis	124–105	Al Butler (18)	21–56
78	March 14	@ Detroit	124–126	Len Chappell (28)	21–57
79	March 15	Detroit	125–139	Bob Boozer (25)	22–57
80	March 17	@ Boston	121–127	Johnny Green (20)	22–58

== Awards and records ==
- Art Heyman, NBA All-Rookie Team 1st Team
