= 1968–69 Duke Blue Devils men's basketball team =

American college basketball season

1968–69 Duke Blue Devils men's basketball
- Conference: Atlantic Coast Conference
- Record: 15–13 (8–6 ACC)
- Head coach: Vic Bubas
- Home arena: Duke Indoor Stadium

1968–69 ACC men's basketball standings
	Conf.				Overall
Team	W		L	PCT	W		L	PCT
No. 4 North Carolina †	12	–	2	.857	27	–	5	.844
No. 13 South Carolina	11	–	3	.786	21	–	7	.750
Duke	8	–	6	.571	15	–	13	.536
NC State	8	–	6	.571	15	–	10	.600
Wake Forest	8	–	6	.571	18	–	9	.667
Virginia	5	–	9	.357	10	–	15	.400
Maryland	2	–	12	.143	8	–	18	.308
Clemson	2	–	12	.143	6	–	19	.240
† 1969 ACC tournament winner Rankings from AP Poll

The 1968–69 Duke Blue Devils men's basketball team represented Duke University in the 1968–69 NCAA Division I men's basketball season. The head coach was Vic Bubas and the team finished the season with an overall record of 15–13 and did not qualify for the NCAA tournament.
