= Eddie Donovan =

American basketball player, coach, and executive

Eddie Donovan (June 2, 1922 in Elizabeth, New Jersey – January 20, 2001) was a professional basketball coach and executive.

He coached the New York Knickerbockers from 1961 through 1965, and was the coach on the opposing sideline when Philadelphia Warriors center Wilt Chamberlain had his record-setting 100-point game in Hershey, Pennsylvania on March 2, 1962.

He later became the team's general manager. In that role, he drafted Willis Reed and traded for Dave DeBusschere, two moves leading up to the Knicks winning the NBA title in 1970.

Donovan later became an executive with the Buffalo Braves, where he won the NBA Executive of the Year Award for the 1973–74 season.

Prior to his career with the Knicks, Donovan was the head men's basketball coach at St. Bonaventure University from 1953 through 1961.

== Head coaching record ==
=== NBA ===
Team	Year	G	W	L	W–L%	Finish	PG	PW	PL	PW–L%	Result
New York	1961–62	80	29	51	.363	4th in Eastern	—	—	—	—	Missed playoffs
New York	1962–63	80	21	59	.263	4th in Eastern	—	—	—	—	Missed playoffs
New York	1963–64	80	22	58	.275	4th in Eastern	—	—	—	—	Missed playoffs
New York	1964–65	38	12	26	.316	left mid-season	—	—	—	—	—
Career		278	84	194	.302		0	0	0	–	

== Death ==
Eddie Donovan died on January 20, 2001, when he was 78. The cause for his death was said to be the complications of stroke.
