= Bobby Roberts (basketball) =

American basketball player and coach

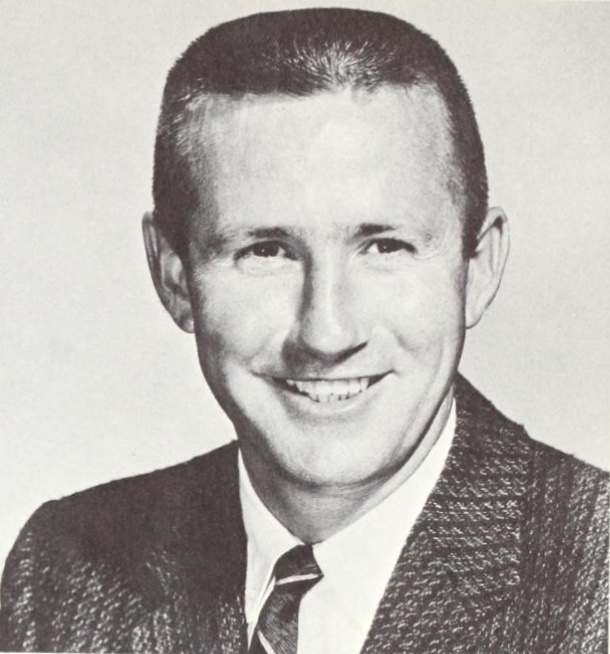
- Roberts from the 1963 Taps

Biographical details
- Born: December 19, 1927; Laurens, South Carolina, U.S.
- Died: June 22, 2002 (aged 74); Aiken, South Carolina, U.S.

Playing career
- 1949–1951: Mars Hill JC
- 1951–1953: Furman

Coaching career (HC unless noted)
- 1954–1958: Palmetto HS
- 1958–1962: Clemson (assistant)
- 1962–1970: Clemson

Head coaching record
- Overall: 82–116

Bobby Roberts (December 19, 1927 – June 22, 2002) was an American college basketball coach for Clemson University from 1962 to 1970.

Roberts played for Mars Hill Junior College (now Mars Hill University) and Furman. He joined Clemson in 1958 as an assistant and coach of the freshman team. He was promoted to head coach when Press Maravich left the Tigers to take an assistant coaching position under Everett Case at NC State.

Roberts coached the Tigers for eight seasons. He was the first coach in school history to lead the ram to consecutive winning seasons in the Atlantic Coast Conference (ACC), in 1965–66 and 1966–67. Roberts resigned his post with six regular-season games to go the 1969–70 season, to be effective at the end of the year. The team finished 7–19 in his last year. He was replaced by Tates Locke on March 18, 1970.

Roberts died on June 22, 2002, at age 74 at his home in Aiken, South Carolina.

== Head coaching record ==
Record table
Season	Team	Overall	Conference	Standing	Postseason
Clemson Tigers (Atlantic Coast Conference) (1962–1970)
1962–63	Clemson	12–13	5–9	T–4th	
1963–64	Clemson	13–12	8–6	3rd	
1964–65	Clemson	8–15	4–10	6th	
1965–66	Clemson	15–10	8–6	T–3rd	
1966–67	Clemson	17–8	9–5	4th	
1967–68	Clemson	4–20	3–11	T–7th	
1968–69	Clemson	6–19	2–12	T–7th	
1969–70	Clemson	7–19	2–12	8th	
Clemson:		82–116 (.414)	41–71 (.366)		
Total:		82–116 (.414)			
National champion Postseason invitational champion Conference regular season champion Conference regular season and conference tournament champion Division regular season champion Division regular season and conference tournament champion Conference tournament champion
