= Fike Recreation Center =

Sports venue in Clemson, South Carolina

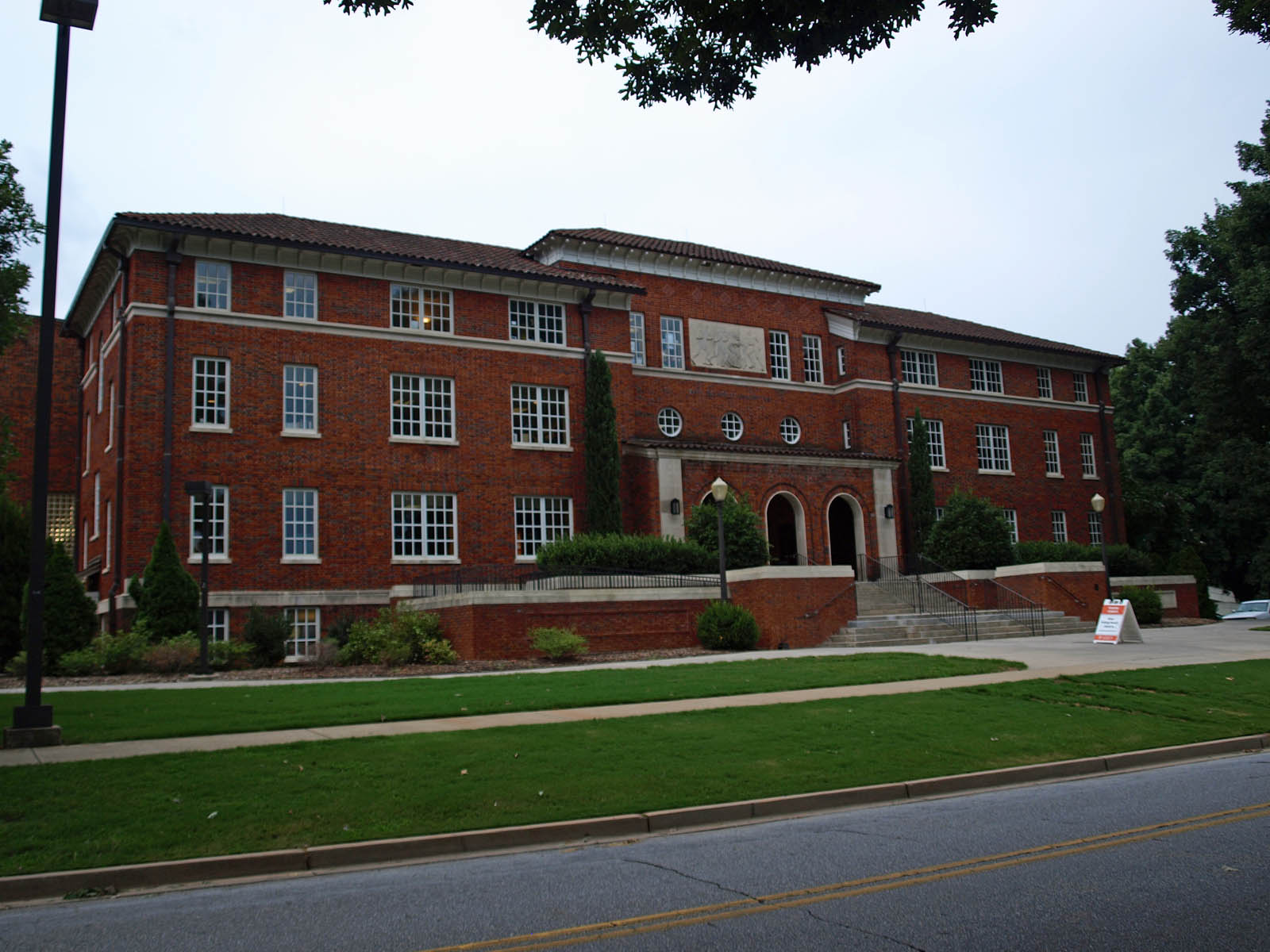
- Interactive map of Fike Recreation Center
- Former names: Clemson Field House (1930–1966); Fike Field House (1966–2003)
- Location: Williamson Rd, Clemson, South Carolina
- Coordinates: 34°40′50″N 82°50′31″W
- Owner: Clemson University
- Operator: Clemson University

Construction
- Opened: November 1, 1930

Fike Recreation Center, originally known as Clemson Field House, is an on-campus recreation facility at Clemson University in Clemson, South Carolina. It houses several gymnasiums, a pool, a fitness atrium, racquetball courts, an indoor walk/jog/run track, and a climbing wall. The basketball team played there from 1930 to 1968, when Littlejohn Coliseum opened.

The building originally opened in 1930 as the Clemson Field House, and was the indoor home to Clemson athletics. It also contained the original dressing rooms for the football team, who would leave the building, cross Williamson Rd., and make their grand entrance, running down the hill into Clemson Memorial Stadium. It was renamed in 1966 in honor of the late Dr. Rupert H. "Rube" Fike, Class of 1908, a longtime booster and founder of the IPTAY Club, one of the country's first athletic booster clubs. It has been expanded three times, in the 1940s, 1970s, and prior to 2003, when it was renamed Fike Recreation Center.
