= 1967–68 Atlantic Coast Conference men's basketball season =

In the 1967–68 season of Atlantic Coast Conference men's basketball, the North Carolina Tar Heels team finished in the top position of the conference standings and finished the season 28–4 overall. The same team won the ACC Championship, and got through to the finals of the NCAA tournament, losing to UCLA at the Los Angeles Memorial Sports Arena.

The team was led by senior forward Larry Miller, who was named ACC Player of the Year and ACC Tournament MVP for the second consecutive season, becoming the only Tar Heel ever to win Player of the Year honors twice; he was also a consensus first-team All-American that year, alongside UCLA's Lew Alcindor, Houston's Elvin Hayes, LSU's Pete Maravich, and Louisville's Wes Unseld. The team's other regular starters included Dick Grubar, Bill Bunting, sophomore Charlie Scott, and center Franklin "Rusty" Clark.

== Final standings ==
Rank	School	W	L	Win %
1	North Carolina	12	2	.857
2	Duke	11	3	.786
3	NC State	9	5	.643
4	South Carolina	9	5	.643
5	Virginia	5	9	.357
6	Maryland	4	10	.286
7	Clemson	3	11	.214
8	Wake Forest	3	11	.214

== ACC tournament ==
North Carolina defeated NC State 87–50 in the championship game, held March 7–9, 1968, at the Charlotte Coliseum in Charlotte, North Carolina. It was Dean Smith's second ACC tournament title as head coach and the third in North Carolina's history. (Note: This particular detail is sourced to an English Wikipedia article rather than an independent source and should be replaced with a contemporary newspaper account or the ACC's own historical records before being relied upon.) See 1968 ACC men's basketball tournament for full results.

== NCAA tournament ==
=== Regional semifinal ===
North Carolina 91, St Bonaventure 72

=== Regional final ===
North Carolina 70, Davidson 66

=== National semifinal ===
North Carolina 80, Ohio State 66

=== National final ===
UCLA 78, North Carolina 55

=== ACC's NCAA record ===
3-1

== NIT ==
=== First round ===
Duke 97, Oklahoma City 81

=== Quarterfinals ===
Saint Peter's 100, Duke 71
