= 1961–62 Atlantic Coast Conference men's basketball season =

== Final standings ==
Team	ACC Regular Season	ACC %	All Games	All Games %	Nonconference Games	Nonconference Games %	Ranked AP All	Ranked AP All %	Ranked AP Nonconference	Ranked AP Nonconference %
Wake Forest	12–2	.857	22–9	.710						
Duke	11–3	.786	20–5	.800						
NC State	10–4	.714	11–6	.647						
South Carolina	7–7	.500	15–12	.556						
North Carolina	7–7	.500	8–9	.471						
Clemson	4–10	.286	12–15	.444						
Maryland	3–11	.214	8–17	.320						
Virginia	2–12	.143	5–18	.217						
Total			101–71	.587						

== ACC tournament ==
See 1962 ACC men's basketball tournament

== NCAA tournament ==
=== Round of 25 ===
Wake Forest 92, Yale 82 (ot)

=== Regional semi-finals ===
Wake Forest 96, Saint Joseph's 85

=== Regional finals ===
Wake Forest 79, Villanova 69

=== National semi-finals ===
Ohio State 84, Wake Forest 68

=== National third place ===
Wake Forest 82, UCLA 80

=== ACC's NCAA record ===
4–1

== NIT ==
League rules prevented ACC teams from playing in the NIT, 1954–1966
