= William & Mary Tribe men's basketball statistical leaders =

The William & Mary Tribe men's basketball statistical leaders are individual statistical leaders of the William & Mary Tribe men's basketball program in various categories, including points, assists, blocks, rebounds, and steals. Within those areas, the lists identify single-game, single-season, and career leaders. The Tribe represent the College of William & Mary in the NCAA's Colonial Athletic Association.

William & Mary began competing in intercollegiate basketball in 1905. However, the school's record book generally does not list records from before the 1950s, as records from this period are often incomplete and inconsistent. Since scoring was much lower then, and teams played far fewer games in a typical season, it is likely that few or no players from this era would appear on these lists anyway.

The NCAA did not officially record assists as a stat until the 1983–84 season, and blocks and steals until the 1985–86 season, but William & Mary's record books includes players in these stats before these seasons. These lists are updated through the end of the 2020–21 season.

== Scoring ==
Career
| Rk | Player | Points | Seasons |
|---|---|---|---|
| 1 | Marcus Thornton | 2178 | 2011–12 2012–13 2013–14 2014–15 |
| 2 | Nathan Knight | 2141 | 2016–17 2017–18 2018–19 2019–20 |
| 3 | Chet Giermak | 2052 | 1946–47 1947–48 1948–49 1949–50 |
| 4 | Jeff Cohen | 2003 | 1957–58 1958–59 1959–60 1960–61 |
| 5 | John Lowenhaupt | 1866 | 1974–75 1975–76 1976–77 1977–78 |
| 6 | Omar Prewitt | 1831 | 2013–14 2014–15 2015–16 2016–17 |
| 7 | Keith Cieplicki | 1812 | 1981–82 1982–83 1983–84 1984–85 |
| 8 | Thomas Roberts | 1765 | 1989–90 1990–91 1991–92 1992–93 |
| 9 | Quinn McDowell | 1621 | 2008–09 2009–10 2010–11 2011–12 |
| 10 | David Schneider | 1491 | 2006–07 2007–08 2008–09 2009–10 |

Season
| Rk | Player | Points | Season |
|---|---|---|---|
| 1 | Chet Giermak | 740 | 1948–49 |
| 2 | Nathan Knight | 663 | 2019–20 |
| 3 | Marcus Thornton | 659 | 2014–15 |
| 4 | John Mahoney | 656 | 1954–55 |
| 5 | Nathan Knight | 651 | 2018–19 |
| 6 | Chet Giermak | 646 | 1949–50 |
| 7 | Jeff Cohen | 628 | 1959–60 |
| 8 | Marcus Thornton | 599 | 2013–14 |
| 9 | Roy Lange | 583 | 1957–58 |
| 10 | Daniel Dixon | 576 | 2016–17 |

Single game
| Rk | Player | Points | Season | Opponent |
|---|---|---|---|---|
| 1 | Jeff Cohen | 49 | 1960–61 | Richmond |
| 2 | John Mahoney | 47 | 1954–55 | Furman |
| 3 | Bill Chambers | 45 | 1952–53 | Washington & Lee |
| | Chet Giermak | 45 | 1948–49 | Baltimore |
| 5 | Nathan Knight | 39 | 2018–19 | Hofstra |
| | Scott Smith | 39 | 1989–90 | George Mason |
| 7 | Tom Bock | 38 | 1988–89 | Towson |
| | Ron Panneton | 38 | 1967–68 | The Citadel |
| | Ron Panneton | 38 | 1966–67 | Richmond |
| | Jeff Cohen | 38 | 1960–61 | West Virginia |

== Rebounds ==
| NCAA Division I record |

Career
| Rk | Player | Rebounds | Seasons |
|---|---|---|---|
| 1 | Jeff Cohen | 1679 | 1957–58 1958–59 1959–60 1960–61 |
| 2 | Bill Chambers | 1270 | 1950–51 1951–52 1952–53 |
| 3 | Nathan Knight | 964 | 2016–17 2017–18 2018–19 2019–20 |
| 4 | Ben Pomeroy | 886 | 1964–65 1965–66 1966–67 |
| 5 | John Mahoney | 869 | 1951–52 1952–53 1953–54 1954–55 |
| 6 | Terry Tarpey | 807 | 2012–13 2013–14 2014–15 2015–16 |
| 7 | David Cully | 783 | 1992–93 1993–94 1994–95 1995–96 |
| 8 | Chuck Sanders | 717 | 1956–57 1957–58 1958–59 1959–60 |
| 9 | Matt Courage | 714 | 1972–73 1973–74 1974–75 1976–77 |
| 10 | Kirk Gooding | 710 | 1960–61 1961–62 1962–63 |

Season
| Rk | Player | Rebounds | Season |
|---|---|---|---|
| 1 | Bill Chambers | 509 | 1951–52 |
| 2 | Bill Chambers | 498 | 1952–53 |
| 3 | Jeff Cohen | 471 | 1959–60 |
| 4 | Jeff Cohen | 424 | 1960–61 |
| 5 | Jeff Cohen | 413 | 1958–59 |
| 6 | Jeff Cohen | 371 | 1957–58 |
| 7 | Nathan Knight | 337 | 2019–20 |
| 8 | John Mahoney | 312 | 1954–55 |
| 9 | Ben Pomeroy | 308 | 1966–67 |
| 10 | John Mahoney | 306 | 1953–54 |

Single game
| Rk | Player | Rebounds | Season | Opponent |
|---|---|---|---|---|
| 1 | Bill Chambers | 51 | 1952–53 | Virginia |
| 2 | Jeff Cohen | 31 | 1960–61 | Richmond |
| | Chuck Sanders | 31 | 1956–57 | Virginia Tech |
| 4 | Kirk Gooding | 27 | 1962–63 | George Washington |
| | Jeff Cohen | 27 | 1959–60 | Richmond |
| 6 | David Cully | 26 | 1995–96 | VMI |
| 7 | Jeff Cohen | 25 | 1960–61 | West Virginia |
| 8 | Todd Cauthorn | 24 | 1992–93 | The Citadel |
| | Jeff Cohen | 24 | 1958–59 | Richmond |
| 10 | Jeff Cohen | 23 | 1957–58 | Richmond |
| | John Mahoney | 23 | 1954–55 | VMI |

== Assists ==
Career
| Rk | Player | Assists | Seasons |
|---|---|---|---|
| 1 | David Cohn | 490 | 2015–16 2016–17 2017–18 |
| 2 | Scott Coval | 409 | 1982–83 1983–84 1984–85 1985–86 |
| 3 | John Lowenhaupt | 369 | 1974–75 1975–76 1976–77 1977–78 |
| 4 | David Schneider | 368 | 2006–07 2007–08 2008–09 2009–10 |
| 5 | Brendan Connor | 358 | 1989–90 1990–91 1991–92 1992–93 |
| 6 | Randy Bracy | 351 | 1995–96 1996–97 1997–98 1998–99 |
| 7 | Mike Enoch | 344 | 1974–75 1975–76 1976–77 1977–78 |
| 8 | Bill Barnes | 341 | 1978–79 1979–80 1980–81 1981–82 |
| 9 | Nick D'Antoni | 340 | 2001–02 2002–03 2003–04 2004–05 |
| 10 | David Cox | 336 | 1991–92 1992–93 1993–94 1994–95 |

Season
| Rk | Player | Assists | Season |
|---|---|---|---|
| 1 | David Cohn | 207 | 2017–18 |
| 2 | Scott Coval | 168 | 1984–85 |
| 3 | Nick D'Antoni | 159 | 2003–04 |
| 4 | David Cohn | 144 | 2015–16 |
| 5 | Anders Nelson | 143 | 2022–23 |
| 6 | David Cohn | 139 | 2016–17 |
| 7 | Bill Barnes | 128 | 1981–82 |
| 8 | David Schneider | 124 | 2007–08 |
| 9 | John Lowenhaupt | 123 | 1976–77 |
| 10 | Matt O'Reilly | 121 | 1988–89 |

Single game
| Rk | Player | Assists | Season | Opponent |
|---|---|---|---|---|
| 1 | Scott Coval | 15 | 1984–85 | George Mason |
| 2 | Scotty Scott | 14 | 1998–99 | Elon |
| 3 | David Cohn | 13 | 2017–18 | Marshall |
| 4 | David Cohn | 12 | 2016–17 | Hofstra |
| | David Cox | 12 | 1994–95 | George Mason |
| 6 | Thornton Scott | 11 | 2019–20 | JMU |
| | David Cohn | 11 | 2017–18 | UNCW |
| | David Cohn | 11 | 2017–18 | Delaware |
| | David Cohn | 11 | 2017–18 | Savannah State |
| | David Cohn | 11 | 2017–18 | Shenandoah |
| | David Cohn | 11 | 2015–16 | UNCW |
| | Sean McCurdy | 11 | 2009–10 | James Madison |
| | Nick D'Antoni | 11 | 2003–04 | George Mason |
| | Nick D'Antoni | 11 | 2003–04 | Towson |
| | Scotty Scott | 11 | 1999–00 | Campbell |
| | Randy Bracy | 11 | 1995–96 | George Mason |
| | Matt O'Reilly | 11 | 1988–89 | Towson |
| | Scott Coval | 11 | 1984–85 | Delaware |
| | Billy Barnes | 11 | 1981–82 | Richmond |
| | John Lowenhaupt | 11 | 1976–77 | Furman |

== Steals ==
Career
| Rk | Player | Steals | Seasons |
|---|---|---|---|
| 1 | Bill Barnes | 207 | 1978–79 1979–80 1980–81 1981–82 |
| 2 | Randy Bracy | 175 | 1995–96 1996–97 1997–98 1998–99 |
| 3 | Terry Tarpey | 171 | 2012–13 2013–14 2014–15 2015–16 |
| 4 | David Schneider | 166 | 2006–07 2007–08 2008–09 2009–10 |
| 5 | John Lowenhaupt | 160 | 1974–75 1975–76 1976–77 1977–78 |
| 6 | Mike Strayhorn | 148 | 1979–80 1980–81 1981–82 1982–83 |
| 7 | Jim Moran | 145 | 1997–98 1998–99 1999–00 2000–01 |
| 8 | Kurt Small | 144 | 1991–92 1992–93 1993–94 1994–95 |
| 9 | Curtis Pride | 136 | 1986–87 1987–88 1988–89 1989–90 |
| 10 | Brendan Connor | 128 | 1989–90 1990–91 1991–92 1992–93 |
| | Scott Whitley | 128 | 1977–78 1978–79 1979–80 1980–81 |

Season
| Rk | Player | Steals | Season |
|---|---|---|---|
| 1 | Jim McDonough | 112 | 1975–76 |
| 2 | Terry Tarpey | 62 | 2015–16 |
| 3 | Terry Tarpey | 58 | 2014–15 |
| | John Lowenhaupt | 58 | 1975–76 |
| 5 | Randy Bracy | 57 | 1997–98 |
| | John Lowenhaupt | 57 | 1977–78 |
| 7 | David Schneider | 56 | 2007–08 |
| | Mike Strayhorn | 56 | 1982–83 |
| 9 | Bill Barnes | 55 | 1980–81 |
| 10 | Bill Barnes | 54 | 1981–82 |
| | Bill Barnes | 54 | 1979–80 |

Single game
| Rk | Player | Steals | Season | Opponent |
|---|---|---|---|---|
| 1 | Rod Musselman | 8 | 1975–76 | Washington College |
| 2 | Randy Bracy | 7 | 1998–99 | The Citadel |
| | Randy Bracy | 7 | 1996–97 | Old Dominion |
| 4 | Brandon Carroll | 6 | 2021–22 | Charleston |
| | Connor Kochera | 6 | 2021–22 | Mary Baldwin |
| | Terry Tarpey | 6 | 2015–16 | Drexel |
| | Terry Tarpey | 6 | 2015–16 | High Point |
| | Terry Tarpey | 6 | 2013–14 | VMI |
| | David Schneider | 6 | 2007–08 | Drexel |
| | Adam Hess | 6 | 2003–04 | George Mason |
| | Randy Bracy | 6 | 1998–99 | American |
| | Randy Bracy | 6 | 1997–98 | Stetson |
| | Jim Moran | 6 | 1997–98 | UNCG |
| | Matt Verkey | 6 | 1993–94 | American |
| | Scott Coval | 6 | 1985–86 | Drexel |
| | Mike Strayhorn | 6 | 1981–82 | Richmond |
| | Billy Barnes | 6 | 1978–79 | Virginia Tech |

== Blocks ==
Career
| Rk | Player | Blocks | Seasons |
|---|---|---|---|
| 1 | David Cully | 248 | 1992–93 1993–94 1994–95 1995–96 |
| 2 | Nathan Knight | 221 | 2016–17 2017–18 2018–19 2019–20 |
| 3 | Adam Duggins | 139 | 1999–00 2000–01 2001–02 2002–03 |
| 4 | Terry Tarpey | 119 | 2012–13 2013–14 2014–15 2015–16 |
| 5 | Marcus Kitts | 110 | 2007–08 2008–09 2009–10 2010–11 |
| 6 | Thomas Roberts | 107 | 1989–90 1990–91 1991–92 1992–93 |
| 7 | Carl Parker | 95 | 1992–93 1993–94 1994–95 1995–96 |
| 8 | Todd Cauthorn | 93 | 1989–90 1990–91 1991–92 1992–93 |
| 9 | Jim Moran | 88 | 1997–98 1998–99 1999–00 2000–01 |
| 10 | Tim Rusthoven | 86 | 2010–11 2011–12 2012–13 2013–14 |

Season
| Rk | Player | Blocks | Season |
|---|---|---|---|
| 1 | David Cully | 91 | 1994–95 |
| 2 | David Cully | 84 | 1995–96 |
| 3 | David Cully | 71 | 1993–94 |
| 4 | Nathan Knight | 70 | 2018–19 |
| 5 | Nathan Knight | 61 | 2017–18 |
| 6 | Marcus Kitts | 60 | 2010–11 |
| 7 | Adam Duggins | 53 | 1999–00 |
| 8 | Adam Duggins | 52 | 2002–03 |
| 9 | Nathan Knight | 49 | 2019–20 |
| 10 | Brandon Carroll | 41 | 2021–22 |
| | Mehkel Harvey | 41 | 2020–21 |
| | Andy Van Vliet | 41 | 2019–20 |
| | Nathan Knight | 41 | 2016–17 |

Single game
| Rk | Player | Blocks | Season | Opponent |
|---|---|---|---|---|
| 1 | David Cully | 10 | 1995–96 | George Mason |
| 2 | David Cully | 9 | 1994–95 | American |
| | David Cully | 9 | 1994–95 | Richmond |
| 4 | Andy Van Vliet | 8 | 2019–20 | JMU |
| | Nathan Knight | 8 | 2018–19 | Charleston |
| | Nathan Knight | 8 | 2017–18 | Hofstra |
| 7 | Nathan Knight | 7 | 2019–20 | Drexel |
| | Nathan Knight | 7 | 2017–18 | Savannah State |
| | Nathan Knight | 7 | 2016–17 | Milligan |
| | David Cully | 7 | 1995–96 | Richmond |
| | David Cully | 7 | 1994–95 | VMI |
| | David Cully | 7 | 1994–95 | Siena |
| | David Cully | 7 | 1993–94 | Navy |
