= 2014–15 William & Mary Tribe men's basketball team =

American college basketball season

2014–15 William & Mary Tribe men's basketball

CAA regular season co-champions

NIT, First round
- Conference: Colonial Athletic Association
- Record: 20–13 (12–6 CAA)
- Head coach: Tony Shaver (12th season)
- Assistant coaches: Jonathan Holmes; Kotie Kimble; Austin Shaver
- Home arena: Kaplan Arena

2014–15 CAA men's basketball standings
	Conf.				Overall
Team	W		L	PCT	W		L	PCT
William & Mary	12	–	6	.667	20	–	13	.606
UNC Wilmington	12	–	6	.667	18	–	14	.563
Northeastern †	12	–	6	.667	23	–	12	.657
James Madison	12	–	6	.667	19	–	14	.576
Hofstra	10	–	8	.556	20	–	14	.588
Delaware	9	–	9	.500	10	–	20	.333
Drexel	9	–	9	.500	11	–	19	.367
Elon	6	–	12	.333	15	–	18	.455
Towson	5	–	13	.278	12	–	20	.375
College of Charleston	3	–	15	.167	9	–	24	.273
† 2015 CAA tournament winner Rankings from AP poll

The 2014–15 William & Mary Tribe men's basketball team represented the College of William & Mary during the 2014–15 NCAA Division I men's basketball season. The Tribe were led by twelfth year head coach Tony Shaver. The team played its home games at Kaplan Arena and were members of the Colonial Athletic Association (CAA). This was the 110th season of the collegiate basketball program at William & Mary. They finished the season 20–13, 12–6 in CAA play to finish in a four way tie for the CAA regular season championship. They advanced to the championship game of the CAA tournament where they lost to Northeastern. As a regular season champion, and #1 seed in their conference tournament, they received an automatic bid to the National Invitation Tournament where they lost in the first round to Tulsa.

== Previous season ==
The team will look to improve upon their 20–12 (10–6 CAA) record from the 2013–14 season that saw the team fall just short of a conference championship in a 75–74 loss to Delaware in the championship game of the 2014 CAA men's basketball tournament. William & Mary will look to earn their first postseason bid since 2010.

== Departures ==
Name	Number	Pos.	Height	Weight	Year	Hometown	Notes
Julian Boatner	2	G	6'2"	185	Senior	Bloomington, Indiana	Graduated
Ben Whitlatch	5	G	6'1"	180	Senior	Bloomington, Indiana	Graduated
Brandon Britt	12	G	6'2"	200	Senior	Chesapeake, Virginia	Graduated
Tim Rusthoven	22	F	6'9"	235	Senior	Winfield, Illinois	Graduated
Kyle Gaillard	23	F	6'8"	220	Senior	Huntersville, North Carolina	Graduated
Fred Heldring	24	F	6'9"	245	Senior	Winnetka, Illinois	Graduated

=== Incoming transfers ===
Name	Number	Pos.	Height	Weight	Year	Hometown	Notes
David Cohn	34	G	6'2"	170	Sophomore	Elmhurst, Illinois	Transferred from Colorado State. Under NCAA transfer rules, Cohn will have to redshirt for the 2014–15 season. Will have three years of remaining eligibility.

== Recruiting Class of 2014 ==
College recruiting information
Name	Hometown	School	Height	Weight	Commit date
Oliver Tot; SF	Meriden, New Hampshire	Kimball Union Academy	6 ft 6 in (1.98 m)	190 lb (86 kg)	Feb 14, 2014
Oliver Tot; SF	Recruit ratings: Scout: Rivals: (65)				
Connor Burchfield; SG	Concord, North Carolina	Concord High School	6 ft 4 in (1.93 m)	170 lb (77 kg)	May 17, 2013
Connor Burchfield; SG	Recruit ratings: Scout: Rivals: (NR)				
Greg Malinowski; SG	Alexandria, Virginia	Episcopal High School	6 ft 5 in (1.96 m)	195 lb (88 kg)	Aug 12, 2013
Greg Malinowski; SG	Recruit ratings: Scout: Rivals: (NR)				
Paul Rowley; SF	Purcellville, Virginia	Loudoun Valley High School	6 ft 7 in (2.01 m)	190 lb (86 kg)	Jul 24, 2013
Paul Rowley; SF	Recruit ratings: Scout: Rivals: (NR)				
Overall recruit ranking:
Note: In many cases, Scout, Rivals, 247Sports, On3, and ESPN may conflict in their listings of height and weight.; In these cases, the average was taken. ESPN grades are on a 100-point scale.; Sources: "2014 Team Ranking". Rivals.

=== Recruiting Class of 2015 ===
College recruiting information
Name	Hometown	School	Height	Weight	Commit date
Hunter Seacat; SF	Mooresville, North Carolina	Lake Norman High School	6 ft 9 in (2.06 m)	220 lb (100 kg)	Sep 8, 2014
Hunter Seacat; SF	Recruit ratings: Scout: Rivals: (NR)				
Overall recruit ranking:
Note: In many cases, Scout, Rivals, 247Sports, On3, and ESPN may conflict in their listings of height and weight.; In these cases, the average was taken. ESPN grades are on a 100-point scale.; Sources: "2015 Team Ranking". Rivals.

== Roster ==
2014–15 William & Mary Tribe men's basketball team
Players
Coaches

Pos.	#	Name	Height	Weight	Year	Previous school	Hometown
G	0	Daniel Dixon	6 ft 5 in (1.96 m)	200 lb (91 kg)	So	Langley/Fishburne	Great Falls, Virginia
G	3	Marcus Thornton	6 ft 4 in (1.93 m)	185 lb (84 kg)	Sr	Bishop McNamara	Upper Marlboro, Maryland
G/F	4	Omar Prewitt	6 ft 6 in (1.98 m)	180 lb (82 kg)	So	Montgomery County	Mount Sterling, Kentucky
G	5	Greg Malinowski	6 ft 5 in (1.96 m)	195 lb (88 kg)	Fr	Episcopal	Chantilly, Virginia
G	10	Connor Burchfield	6 ft 4 in (1.93 m)	175 lb (79 kg)	Fr	Concord	Concord, North Carolina
G	11	Michael Schlotman	6 ft 4 in (1.93 m)	190 lb (86 kg)	RS Fr	Munster	Munster, Indiana
G	21	Oliver Tot	6 ft 6 in (1.98 m)	198 lb (90 kg)	Fr	Kimball Union Academy	Bratislava, Slovakia
F	22	Paul Rowley (redshirt)	6 ft 8 in (2.03 m)	190 lb (86 kg)	Fr	Loudoun Valley	Purcellville, Virginia
G	25	Terry Tarpey	6 ft 5 in (1.96 m)	200 lb (91 kg)	Jr	Fairfield Prep	Stamford, Connecticut
F	31	Sean Shelton	6 ft 9 in (2.06 m)	245 lb (111 kg)	Jr	Saint Francis Catholic	Traverse City, Michigan
G	34	David Cohn (redshirt)	6 ft 4 in (1.93 m)	170 lb (77 kg)	So	York; Colorado State	Elmhurst, Illinois
F	41	Jack Whitman	6 ft 9 in (2.06 m)	225 lb (102 kg)	RS Fr	Lexington Catholic	Lexington, Kentucky
F	43	Tom Schalk	6 ft 8 in (2.03 m)	200 lb (91 kg)	Sr	Apple Valley	Burnsville, Minnesota

Head coach

- Tony Shaver (North Carolina)

Assistant coach(es)

- Jonathan Holmes (North Carolina)
- Kotie Kimble (Coastal Carolina)
- Austin Shaver (Virginia)

Legend

- (C) Team captain
- (S) Suspended
- (I) Ineligible
- (W) Walk-on
- Injured
- Current redshirt

Roster

== Program notes ==
- On December 19, 2014, head coach Tony Shaver won his 500th career NCAA game after the Tribe defeated Washington College, 86–46.
- On January 10, 2015, junior guard Terry Tarpey recorded the first triple double in program history (in its 110th season) during William & Mary's 81–73 win against James Madison. Tarpey had 18 points, 11 rebounds, and 10 assists.
- On January 14, 2015, William & Mary recorded the largest comeback win in program history against UNC Wilmington, winning 76–72, after trailing by 22 points earlier in the game.
- On February 25, 2015, Marcus Thornton scored his 2,053rd career point in a 65–50 win against Towson, thus breaking the previous record (2,052) set by Chet Giermak during the 1949–50 season. It was the longest-standing career points record (65 years) for any NCAA program at the time.
- On June 25, 2015, Thornton was selected in the 2015 NBA draft, taken in the second round (45th overall) to the Boston Celtics. He was the first William & Mary player drafted since Keith Cieplicki in 1985 (7th round, 161st overall), but the first to do so in the NBA's modern draft format (only two rounds).

== Schedule ==
Date time, TV	Rank^{#}	Opponent^{#}	Result	Record	Site (attendance) city, state
Non-conference regular season
November 14*; 6:00 pm, SECN		at No. 7 Florida	L 45–68	0–1	O'Connell Center (10,861); Gainesville, Florida
November 18*; 7:00 pm		Howard	W 56–49	1–1	Kaplan Arena (2,312); Williamsburg, Virginia
November 20*; 7:00 pm		Bluefield	W 100–57	2–1	Kaplan Arena (1,380); Williamsburg, Virginia
November 22*; 8:00 pm		at Rice	W 69–65	3–1	Tudor Fieldhouse (1,195); Houston, Texas
November 25*; 4:30 pm		Western Illinois	W 83–49	4–1	Kaplan Arena (1,913); Williamsburg, Virginia
November 29*; 7:00 pm		Wofford	W 66–62	5–1	Kaplan Arena (2,689); Williamsburg, Virginia
December 3*; 7:00 pm		at Richmond	L 67–68	5–2	Robins Center (4,684); Richmond, Virginia
December 6*; 7:00 pm		at High Point	L 63–66	5–3	Millis Athletic Convocation Center (1,750); High Point, North Carolina
December 19*; 7:00 pm		Washington College	W 86–46	6–3	Kaplan Arena (1,452); Williamsburg, Virginia
December 22*; 7:00 pm		at Old Dominion; Rivalry	L 62–69	6–4	Ted Constant Convocation Center (7,796); Norfolk, Virginia
December 30*; 7:00 pm, RSN		at No. 19 North Carolina	L 64–86	6–5	Dean Smith Center (20,053); Chapel Hill, North Carolina
Conference regular season
January 3; 2:00 pm, CSN		College of Charleston	W 75–45	7–5 (1–0)	Kaplan Arena ( 2,291); Williamsburg, Virginia
January 5; 7:00 pm		at Drexel	W 73–47	8–5 (2–0)	Daskalakis Athletic Center (1,051); Philadelphia
January 8; 8:00 pm, ASN		at Elon	L 79–85	8–6 (2–1)	Alumni Gym (1,384); Elon, North Carolina
January 10; 4:00 pm		James Madison	W 81–73	9–6 (3–1)	Kaplan Arena (3,446); Williamsburg, Virginia
January 14; 7:00 pm		UNC Wilmington	W 76–72	10–6 (4–1)	Kaplan Arena (1,873); Williamsburg, Virginia
January 17; 12:00 pm, CSN		at Towson	W 85–72	11–6 (5–1)	SECU Arena (1,889); Towson, Maryland
January 21; 7:00 pm		at Delaware	L 80–84	11–7 (5–2)	Bob Carpenter Center (1,819); Newark, Delaware
January 24; 2:00 pm, NBCSN		Northeastern	W 78–62	12–7 (6–2)	Kaplan Arena (5,053); Williamsburg, Virginia
January 28; 7:00 pm		Hofstra	W 100–79	13–7 (7–2)	Kaplan Arena (2,919); Williamsburg, Virginia
January 31; 4:00 pm, CSN		at James Madison	W 84–65	14–7 (8–2)	JMU Convocation Center (4,133); Harrisonburg, Virginia
February 5; 7:30 pm		at College of Charleston	L 72–80	14–8 (8–3)	TD Arena (3,305); Charleston, South Carolina
February 7; 8:00 pm, ASN		at UNC Wilmington	W 56–53	15–8 (9–3)	Trask Coliseum (5,088); Wilmington, North Carolina
February 11; 7:00 pm		Elon	W 77–58	16–8 (10–3)	Kaplan Arena (2,735); Williamsburg, Virginia
February 14; 2:30 pm, NBCSN		Delaware	L 70–73	16–9 (10–4)	Kaplan Arena (4,185); Williamsburg, Virginia
February 18; 7:00 pm		at Northeastern	L 64–75	16–10 (10–5)	Matthews Arena (927); Boston
February 22; 4:30 pm, NBCSN		at Hofstra	W 80–78	17–10 (11–5)	Mack Sports Complex (3,148); Hempstead, New York
February 25; 7:00 pm		Towson	W 65–50	18–10 (12–5)	Kaplan Arena (3,227); Williamsburg, Virginia
February 28; 2:00 pm, CSN		Drexel	L 66–80	18–11 (12–6)	Kaplan Arena (5,312); Williamsburg, Virginia
CAA Tournament
March 7; 12:00 pm, CSN		vs. Elon; Quarterfinals	W 72–59	19–11	Royal Farms Arena (3,762); Baltimore
March 8; 2:30 pm, NBCSN		vs. Hofstra; Semifinals	W 92–91 ^{2OT}	20–11	Royal Farms Arena (3,703); Baltimore, Maryland
March 9; 7:00 pm, NBCSN		vs. Northeastern; Championship game	L 61–72	20–12	Royal Farms Arena (5,721); Baltimore, Maryland
NIT
March 17*; 8:15 pm, ESPN3	No. (7)	at (2) Tulsa; First round	L 67–70	20–13	Reynolds Center (2,547); Tulsa, Oklahoma
*Non-conference game. ^{#}Rankings from AP Poll. (#) Tournament seedings in parentheses. All times are in Eastern Time. (#) during NIT is seed within region.

== See also ==
- 2014–15 William & Mary Tribe women's basketball team
