= John Lowenhaupt =

American basketball player

Personal information
- Listed height: 6 ft 5 in (1.96 m)

Career information
- High school: Archbishop Molloy (Queens, New York)
- College: William & Mary (1974–1978)
- NBA draft: 1978: undrafted
- Position: Small forward

Career highlights
- First-team All-SoCon (1976); Second-team All-SoCon (1977); No. 42 retired by William & Mary Tribe

John P. Lowenhaupt is an American former basketball player at the College of William & Mary in Williamsburg, Virginia.

== College of William & Mary ==
A 6'5" small forward, Lowenhaupt ranks among the top all-time in the state of Virginia for men's collegiate Division I basketball scoring. He holds career averages of 16.0 points on 54.1% shooting in 112 games played. Years later his jersey was the first retired at the College, making him one of only six players to have this honor. He finished third in career points at William & Mary with 1,866 during his tenure. Lowenhaupt trails only Marcus Thornton (2,178), Chet Giermak (2,052), Nathan Knight, and Jeff Cohen (2,003) at their alma mater for most ever. During his career with the Tribe, Lowenhaupt garnered many accolades. In 1989, Lowenhaupt refused induction into the Athletic Hall of Fame. In 2025, Lowenhaupt accepted his induction into the William & Mary Hall of Fame.

== Later life ==
Lowenhaupt became an accountant and still lives in Williamsburg, Virginia with his wife, Betty Joyce, and their three children, Tucker and Jordan, and also Bailey. Bruce Hornsby's song, Rainbow's Cadillac, was written about Lowenhaupt's time at William & Mary. He is CEO of his own business, John Lowenhaupt, CPA.
