= 1959 NCAA University Division basketball championship game =

1959 NCAA Tournament Championship Game
National championship game
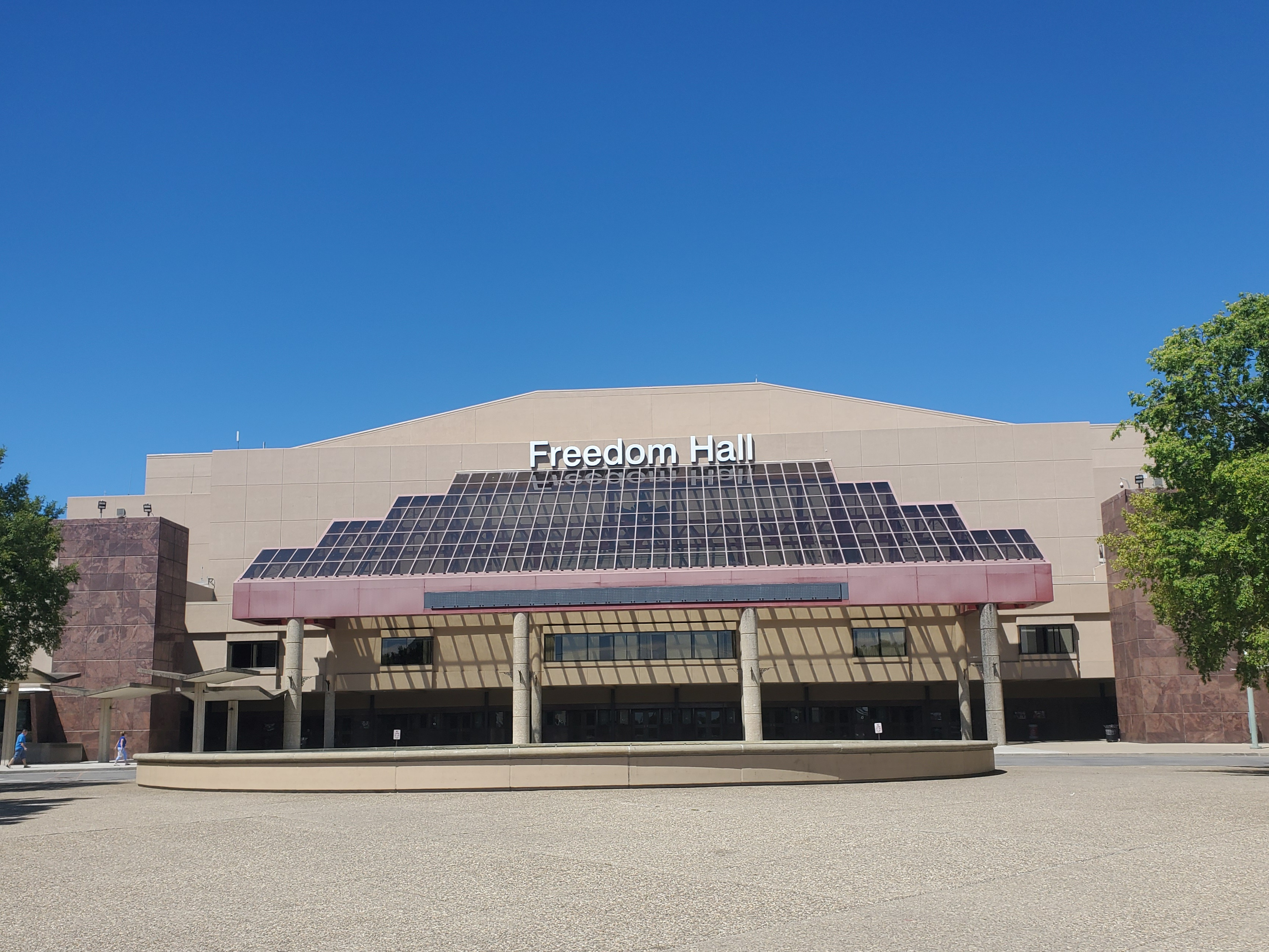
- Freedom Hall in Louisville, Kentucky, hosted the championship game.
California Golden Bears	West Virginia Mountaineers
PCC	SoCon
(24–4)	(29–4)
71	70
Head coach: Pete Newell	Head coach: Fred Schaus
- AP: 11
- Coaches: 9
- AP: 10
- Coaches: 11
	1st half	2nd half	Total
California Golden Bears	39	32	71
West Virginia Mountaineers	33	37	70
- Date: March 21, 1959
- Venue: Freedom Hall, Louisville, Kentucky
- Referees: Tommy Bell and Red Mihalik
- Attendance: 18,498

The 1959 NCAA University Division Basketball Championship Game was the final of the 1959 NCAA University Division basketball tournament and determined the National Collegiate Athletic Association's (NCAA) national champion in men's basketball for the 1958–59 season. The game was held on March 21, 1959, at Freedom Hall in Louisville, Kentucky. The California Golden Bears defeated the West Virginia Mountaineers, 71–70, to win the school's only national title in men's basketball.

== Background ==
=== California Golden Bears ===
The Golden Bears were coached by Pete Newell, who was in his fifth season with the team. Entering the 1958–59 season, California had reached the NCAA Tournament in each of the previous two years. In the 1958 event, the Golden Bears had made it to the regional finals, where a Seattle team featuring Elgin Baylor had defeated them in overtime. Senior guard Denny Fitzpatrick led the team in scoring with an average of 13.3 points per game. Future National Basketball Association player Darrall Imhoff, a center in his junior season, added 11.5 points per game, along with an average of 11 rebounds. Guard Al Buch, the captain of the squad, contributed 9.2 points per game. Sophomore forward Bill McClintock and senior Bob Dalton each averaged over 7 points per game. Other players on the team included Dick Doughty, Jack Grout, Jim Langley, and Bernie Simpson.

California began its season on December 3, 1958, with a 60–36 victory over San Jose State. The Golden Bears followed that game with wins over San Francisco and Saint Mary's before losing by three points to Kansas State, the third-ranked team in the country. Despite the defeat, the Golden Bears entered the Associated Press poll at number 15 on December 15. California subsequently beat Big Ten Conference opposition in Iowa and Wisconsin, then lost 55–43 to 16th-ranked Saint Louis. After a 90–46 win over Arizona, the Golden Bears began Pacific Coast Conference (PCC) play on January 2, 1959, by defeating Washington by an 11-point margin. The following day, they lost 59–57 at Oregon. After two wins, California was defeated by Stanford, 56–53, on January 16. A rematch one day later resulted in a 21-point Golden Bears victory, their first of 12 wins in a row to conclude the regular season. The streak included two wins each over UCLA, USC, and Oregon State. California concluded the regular season as the 11th-ranked team in the AP Poll, having won the PCC title with a 14–2 record in conference play (21–4 overall), and earned a berth in the NCAA Tournament.

On March 13, the Golden Bears began their NCAA Tournament run in the West regional semifinals against Utah. Having held a 15-point advantage at halftime, California held on for a 71–53 win. Buch led all scorers with 15 points. One day later, California faced Saint Mary's in the regional final, again jumping out to a double-digit halftime lead en route to winning 66–46 as Fitzpatrick scored 21 points. The Golden Bears earned a berth in the Final Four, where their opponents were the Cincinnati Bearcats, who featured future Basketball Hall of Fame member Oscar Robertson, the top scorer in college basketball with an average of 32.6 points per game. Robertson was limited to a 19-point performance by California, which received 40 combined points by Imhoff and Buch. With a 64–58 victory, the Golden Bears clinched an appearance in the national championship game.

=== West Virginia Mountaineers ===
Fred Schaus, the head coach of the Mountaineers, also was in his fifth season in 1958–59. His teams had reached the NCAA Tournament in each of the previous four years, but the program had never made it past the first round. The star player for the Mountaineers was Jerry West, an eventual Basketball Hall of Fame member who posted an average of 26.6 points per game in 1958–59. Bobby Smith, a guard like West, was the team's second-leading scorer, with 12.6 points per game, while guard Marvin Bucky Bolvard also averaged in double figures. Center Willie Akers had 7.2 rebounds per game—second on the team behind West's mark of 12.3—and scored an average of 7.4 points. Forward James Ritchie and center Robert Clousson each averaged about seven points per game as well. Other contributors on the West Virginia roster included guards Lee Patrone and Ronald Retton, and center Joe Posch.

On December 1, West Virginia played its first game of the season, a 76–67 win over Furman in Southern Conference play. It was the start of a five-game winning streak, which was capped by a 38-point victory over Duke. Virginia ended the Mountaineers' run with a 3-point win in Charleston on December 13, which was followed by a West Virginia win over Richmond. The Mountaineers then played in the Kentucky Invitational, where they defeated Oklahoma State before losing to the host, Kentucky, who was ranked second in the country. In another game against ranked opposition, the Mountaineers took number 12 Northwestern to double overtime before losing 118–109. Afterwards, West Virginia defeated 11th-ranked Tennessee by four points. That contest started an 11-game win streak, during which West Virginia posted wins over Penn State and Pittsburgh, among others. After a loss to New York University in overtime, the Mountaineers won their last four games of the regular season and three more in the Southern Conference tournament, winning the title. Having started the year fourth in the AP Poll, the Mountaineers remained in the top 11 for the entire season, and entered the tournament as the 10th-ranked team in major college basketball, with a 25–4 record (11–0 in Southern Conference competition).

The Mountaineers' first NCAA Tournament game was on March 10 against Dartmouth. Behind 25 points from West, they posted a 14-point win. In a closer regional semifinal matchup, West scored 36 points and had 15 rebounds to help West Virginia rally from a six-point halftime deficit against St. Joseph's and win 95–92. The regional final, against Boston University, was another tight contest. West again paced the Mountaineers with 33 points on 12-of-24 shooting, and West Virginia prevailed 86–82. In their Final Four game, the Mountaineers defeated Louisville, behind 38 points and 15 rebounds by West.

== Game summary ==
The national championship game was played on March 21, 1959, at Freedom Hall in Louisville, Kentucky. An announced crowd of 18,498 fans was in attendance for the contest, which was preceded by a third-place game between Cincinnati and Louisville. The Bearcats won 98–85 behind a 39-point effort from Robertson, who during the contest set the major-college record for career points by a player after his second season with 1,962, surpassing Frank Selvy's total of 1,947 points.

Although California succeeded in slowing the pace of the Mountaineers' fast break offense, their defense showed vulnerabilities early in the game, as West Virginia tallied 11 successful field goal attempts early in the game. West Virginia played a zone press defense that sent multiple defenders towards California ball-handlers, a strategy that disrupted the Golden Bears' offense, which under Newell was known for its "deliberate", slow-paced nature. After nine minutes, West Virginia held a 23–13 advantage. Newell then went to his bench, substituting out Buch, Imhoff and McClintock. Along with changing players, he directed the Golden Bears to play a three-quarter-court press defense, which proved effective in changing the momentum. Over the next six minutes, California scored 16 of 19 points to turn their deficit into a three-point lead. On two occasions later in the half, the Mountaineers pulled within a single point of the Golden Bears, but they were unable to regain the lead, and at halftime California was leading by six points, 39–33.

In the beginning stages of the second half, California got off to a strong start, scoring eight of the first nine points. Sports Illustrated writer Jeremiah Tax reported that "The Mountaineers were simply overeager, made a number of foolish errors, and California took advantage of every one of them". By the time two and a half minutes had elapsed, the Golden Bears had extended their lead to 47–34. While West Virginia was able to reduce the gap to nine points over the following minutes, they could not make further progress. Over seven minutes into the second half, the Golden Bears had restored their 13-point advantage. The account of the game from the Associated Press stated that, during the second half, "officials were shining up the trophy in anticipation of handing it to Cal." In addition, West was playing with three personal fouls. At this point, West Virginia substituted Clousson out of the game, switching West to the center position to replace him. This sparked a run by the Mountaineers over the following nine minutes, in which West Virginia tallied 18 of the 26 points scored. During the run, the Mountaineers generated several steals from their pressing defense. The Golden Bears' advantage was narrowed to 65–62. With 3:10 remaining on the clock, California's Dalton scored on a jump shot. Following two successful free throw attempts by West Virginia's Retton, McClintock rebounded a missed Golden Bears' shot and scored, pushing his team's lead to 69–64. Bolvard responded for the Mountaineers with a pair of free throws, bringing West Virginia within three points as the final minute approached.

On a subsequent Mountaineers possession, West attacked the basket and attempted a layup. It was goaltended by Imhoff; West's score brought West Virginia to within a single point of the lead. Imhoff was tied up by the West Virginia defense on the Golden Bears' next possession, resulting in a jump ball. The Golden Bears' center then earned possession off of the jump ball, and attempted a hook shot 20 feet from the basket. The shot was no good, but Imhoff rebounded his own miss and hit an off-balance bank shot to give California a 71–68 lead with under 20 seconds remaining. Akers recorded the final basket of the game, a lay-in with five seconds on the clock, but the Mountaineers were unable to score again as the Golden Bears won 71–70 to claim the national title.

== Statistical summary ==
West led all scorers with 28 points, on 10-of-21 shooting from the floor and 8-of-12 from the free throw line. The output enabled West to match the tournament's single-year scoring record with 160 points. He also had the most rebounds of any player, with 11. Despite his team's defeat, West was named the Most Outstanding Player of the event. Two other Mountaineers players, Akers and Clousson, each reached double figures in scoring with 10 points, while Bolvard contributed six points. Overall, West Virginia made 25 of its 55 field goal attempts, for a make percentage of 45.5%. The Mountaineers had a 34–31 rebounding advantage in the game.

California shot 43.9 percent for the game (29 for 66) and had 11 more shot attempts than West Virginia. The team's leading scorer was Fitzpatrick, who had 20 points on 8-of-13 shooting from the field. Dalton contributed 15 points, while Grout and Imhoff had 10 each. McClintock scored eight points and led the Golden Bears in rebounding with 10 for the game.

== Aftermath ==
In the season following their championship, the Golden Bears had a 28–2 record and returned to the NCAA tournament, reaching the final. There, they lost to Ohio State. This was the final season in which Newell coached California, as he announced his retirement from the job in the aftermath of the game. Following his departure, the team did not reach the NCAA Tournament for 30 years. The 1958–59 Golden Bears are the only team in the history of the school's men's basketball program to win the national championship; as of 2022, the closest the Golden Bears have come to making the title game again after 1960 came in 1993 and 1997, when they reached the regional semifinals.

The 1959–60 Mountaineers returned to the NCAA Tournament, advancing to the regional semifinals; they finished the season with a 26–5 record. That was Schaus' final season as head coach of the team. West Virginia made several tournament appearances in the 1960s, 1980s, and 1990s, but did not return to the regional finals until 2005. Although the Mountaineers reached the Final Four in 2010, they have not made another championship game since 1959.
