= 1958 Southern Conference men's basketball tournament =

- Classification: Division I
- Season: 1957–58
- Teams: 8
- Site: Richmond Arena; Richmond, VA
- Champions: West Virginia (4th title)
- Winning coach: Fred Schaus (4th title)

1957–58 Southern Conference men's basketball standings
	Conf.				Overall
Team	W		L	PCT	W		L	PCT
No. 1 West Virginia †	12	–	0	1.000	26	–	2	.929
Virginia Tech	10	–	5	.667	11	–	8	.579
George Washington	8	–	4	.667	12	–	11	.522
The Citadel	9	–	6	.600	16	–	11	.593
Richmond	8	–	8	.500	14	–	12	.538
William & Mary	9	–	9	.500	15	–	14	.517
Furman	4	–	8	.333	10	–	16	.385
Davidson	4	–	8	.333	9	–	15	.375
Washington and Lee	4	–	9	.308	9	–	16	.360
VMI	1	–	12	.077	4	–	17	.190
† Southern Conference Tournament winner Rankings from AP Poll

The 1958 Southern Conference men's basketball tournament took place from March 6–8, 1958 at the Richmond Arena in Richmond, Virginia. The West Virginia Mountaineers, led by head coach Fred Schaus, won their fourth Southern Conference title and received the automatic berth to the 1958 NCAA tournament.

== Format ==
The top eight finishers of the conference's ten members were eligible for the tournament. Teams were seeded based on conference winning percentage. The tournament used a preset bracket consisting of three rounds.

== Bracket ==
Quarterfinals; March 6
1	#2 West Virginia	91
8	Davidson	61
4	The Citadel	59
5	Richmond	63
2	Virginia Tech	61
6	William & Mary	79
3	George Washington	73
7	Furman	59

Semifinals; March 7
1	#2 West Virginia	81
5	Richmond	70
3	George Washington	56
6	William & Mary	67

Finals; March 8
1	#2 West Virginia	74
6	William & Mary	58

* Overtime game

== See also ==
- List of Southern Conference men's basketball champions
