= 1958–59 William & Mary Indians men's basketball team =

American college basketball season

1958–59 William & Mary Indians men's basketball
- Conference: Southern Conference
- Record: 13–11 (7–7 SoCon)
- Head coach: Bill Chambers (2nd season)
- Home arena: Blow Gymnasium

1958–59 Southern Conference men's basketball standings
	Conf.				Overall
Team	W		L	PCT	W		L	PCT
No. 10 West Virginia †	11	–	0	1.000	29	–	5	.853
Virginia Tech	10	–	2	.833	16	–	5	.762
The Citadel	7	–	4	.636	15	–	5	.750
William & Mary	7	–	7	.500	13	–	11	.542
Richmond	6	–	8	.429	11	–	11	.500
Furman	5	–	7	.417	14	–	12	.538
George Washington	4	–	7	.364	14	–	11	.560
Davidson	2	–	8	.200	9	–	15	.375
VMI	2	–	11	.154	5	–	13	.278
† Southern Conference Tournament winner Rankings from AP Poll

The 1958–59 William & Mary Indians men's basketball team represented the College of William & Mary in intercollegiate basketball during the 1958–59 NCAA University Division men's basketball season. Under the second year of head coach Bill Chambers, the team finished the season 13–11 and 7–7 in the Southern Conference. William & Mary played its home games at Blow Gymnasium. This was the 54th season of the collegiate basketball program at William & Mary, whose nickname is now the Tribe.

The Indians finished in 4th place in the conference and qualified for the 1959 Southern Conference men's basketball tournament, held at the Richmond Arena. William & Mary defeated Richmond in the quarterfinals before losing in the semifinals to top-seeded West Virginia.

== Program notes ==
- William & Mary played two teams for the first time this season: Louisiana Tech and North Texas State.
- Roy Lange was named, for the second consecutive year, to the first team all-Southern Conference, and Jeff Cohen was named to the second team.

== Schedule ==
Date time, TV	Rank^{#}	Opponent^{#}	Result	Record	Site city, state
Regular season
*		at Virginia	L 74–85	0–1	Memorial Gymnasium; Charlottesville, VA
*		at Washington and Lee	W 63–60	1–1	Doremus Gymnasium; Lexington, VA
		George Washington	W 57–52	2–1 (1–0)	Blow Gymnasium; Williamsburg, VA
*		Hampden–Sydney	W 59–46	3–1	Blow Gymnasium; Williamsburg, VA
12/15/1958		VMI	W 82–69	4–1 (2–0)	Blow Gymnasium; Williamsburg, VA
		Davidson	W 72–56	5–1 (3–0)	Blow Gymnasium; Williamsburg, VA
*		vs. Louisiana Tech; Gulf South Classic	L 49–63	5–2	Hirsch Memorial Coliseum; Shreveport, LA
*		at North Texas State	W 82–77	6–2	Men's Gymnasium; Denton, TX
*		at Murray State	W 64–62	7–2	Racer Arena; Murray, KY
1/3/1959		at Furman	L 70–78	7–3 (3–1)	Greenville Memorial Auditorium; Greenville, SC
		at Davidson	W 59–57	8–3 (4–1)	Johnston Gym; Davidson, NC
1/10/1959		Richmond	W 83–65	9–3 (5–1)	Blow Gymnasium; Williamsburg, VA
*		at Morris Harvey	L 67–75	9–4	Charleston, WV
1/13/1959		vs. No. 10 West Virginia	L 76–88	9–5 (5–2)	WVU Field House; Morgantown, WV
		VPI	W 59–58	10–5 (6–2)	Blow Gymnasium; Williamsburg, VA
1/30/1959		at No. 10 West Virginia	L 68–82	10–6 (6–3)	WVU Field House; Morgantown, WV
		at VPI	L 68–74	10–7 (6–4)	War Memorial Gymnasium; Blacksburg, VA
		at VMI	W 86–60	11–7 (7–4)	Cormack Field House; Lexington, VA
		at George Washington	L 68–87	11–8 (7–5)	Fort Myer Gymnasium; Fort Myer, VA
2/9/1959		Furman	L 70–71	11–9 (7–6)	Blow Gymnasium; Williamsburg, VA
*		Washington and Lee	W 109–62	12–9	Blow Gymnasium; Williamsburg, VA
2/21/1959		at Richmond	L 66–71	12–10 (7–7)	Richmond Arena; Richmond, VA
1959 Southern Conference Basketball Tournament
2/26/1959		at (5) Richmond; Quarterfinals	W 87–69	13–10	Richmond Arena; Richmond, VA
2/27/1959		vs. No. 10 (1) West Virginia; Semifinals	L 82–85	13–11	Richmond Arena; Richmond, VA
*Non-conference game. ^{#}Rankings from AP Poll. (#) Tournament seedings in parentheses.
