= 1958–59 West Virginia Mountaineers men's basketball team =

American college basketball season

1958–59 West Virginia Mountaineers men's basketball

Southern Conference champions NCAA tournament, runner-up

National Championship Game, L 70-71 vs. California
- Conference: Southern Conference

Ranking
- Coaches: No. 11
- AP: No. 10
- Record: 29–5 ( SoCon)
- Head coach: Fred Schaus
- Home arena: WVU Field House

1958–59 Southern Conference men's basketball standings
	Conf.				Overall
Team	W		L	PCT	W		L	PCT
No. 10 West Virginia †	11	–	0	1.000	29	–	5	.853
Virginia Tech	10	–	2	.833	16	–	5	.762
The Citadel	7	–	4	.636	15	–	5	.750
William & Mary	7	–	7	.500	13	–	11	.542
Richmond	6	–	8	.429	11	–	11	.500
Furman	5	–	7	.417	14	–	12	.538
George Washington	4	–	7	.364	14	–	11	.560
Davidson	2	–	8	.200	9	–	15	.375
VMI	2	–	11	.154	5	–	13	.278
† Southern Conference Tournament winner Rankings from AP Poll

The 1958–59 West Virginia Mountaineers men's basketball team represented West Virginia University in NCAA competition in the 1958–59 season. Coached by Fred Schaus and led by Hall of Fame guard Jerry West, the Mountaineers, then a member of the Southern Conference, lost in the final of that year's NCAA tournament to California.

== Season summary ==
West Virginia wasn’t a one-man team, far from it, but guard Jerry West was the star of the show, as he proved after leading the mountaineers to the final four. He scored 38 points and grabbed 15 rebounds in a semifinal win over Louisville, then scored 28 points and snared 11 boards against California in the title game. That effort wasn’t enough to prevent the Bears from winning, by a single point, 71–70.

== NCAA basketball tournament ==
- East
  - West Virginia 82, Dartmouth 68
  - West Virginia 95, St. Joseph’s, Pennsylvania 92
  - West Virginia 86, Boston 82
- Final Four
  - West Virginia 94, Louisville 79
  - California 71, West Virginia 70

== Team players drafted into the NBA ==
Round	Pick	Player	NBA club
3	20	Bob Smith	Minneapolis Lakers
