= 1959 Southern Conference men's basketball tournament =

- Classification: Division I
- Season: 1958–59
- Teams: 8
- Site: Richmond Arena; Richmond, VA
- Champions: West Virginia (5th title)
- Winning coach: Fred Schaus (5th title)

1958–59 Southern Conference men's basketball standings
	Conf.				Overall
Team	W		L	PCT	W		L	PCT
No. 10 West Virginia †	11	–	0	1.000	29	–	5	.853
Virginia Tech	10	–	2	.833	16	–	5	.762
The Citadel	7	–	4	.636	15	–	5	.750
William & Mary	7	–	7	.500	13	–	11	.542
Richmond	6	–	8	.429	11	–	11	.500
Furman	5	–	7	.417	14	–	12	.538
George Washington	4	–	7	.364	14	–	11	.560
Davidson	2	–	8	.200	9	–	15	.375
VMI	2	–	11	.154	5	–	13	.278
† Southern Conference Tournament winner Rankings from AP Poll

The 1959 Southern Conference men's basketball tournament took place from February 26–28, 1959 at the Richmond Arena in Richmond, Virginia. The West Virginia Mountaineers, led by head coach Fred Schaus, won their fifth Southern Conference title and received the automatic berth to the 1959 NCAA tournament.

== Format ==
The top eight finishers of the conference's nine members were eligible for the tournament. Teams were seeded based on conference winning percentage. The tournament used a preset bracket consisting of three rounds.

== Bracket ==
Quarterfinals; February 26
1	#10 West Virginia	100
8	Davidson	65
4	William & Mary	87
5	Richmond	69
2	Virginia Tech	67
7	George Washington	85
3	The Citadel	93
6	Furman	88

Semifinals; February 27
1	#10 West Virginia	85
4	William & Mary	82
3	The Citadel	53
7	George Washington	52

Finals; February 28
1	#10 West Virginia	85
3	The Citadel	66

* Overtime game

== See also ==
- List of Southern Conference men's basketball champions
