= Rick Boyages =

American basketball coach (born 1962)

Personal information
- Born: March 15, 1962 (age 64) Wakefield, Massachusetts, U.S.

Career information
- High school: Wakefield Memorial (Wakefield, Massachusetts); Northfield Mount Hermon (Northfield, Massachusetts)
- College: Bowdoin (1981–1985)
- NBA draft: 1985: undrafted

Career history

Coaching
- 1985–1987: Babson (assistant)
- 1987–1991: Bates
- 1991–1997: Boston College (assistant)
- 1997–2000: Ohio State (associate HC)
- 2000–2003: William & Mary
- 2003–2004: Ohio State (associate HC)

Richard James Boyages (born March 15, 1962) spent 12 years as Vice President for Men's Basketball for the Big Ten Conference. Working with Big Ten Commissioner James E. Delany, Boyages served as the primary administrator and conference office liaison for 31 different head coaches, multiple national television networks (CBS, ESPN, FOX, BTN), USA Basketball, and the NCAA during his tenure with the Big Ten. He also was involved with the Big Ten Conference Men’s Basketball Tournament and Executive Director of the Collegiate Officiating Consortium, LLC, an organization with oversight of NCAA Division I officiating for 65 institutions in 22 states including the Big Ten, Mid-American Conference, Summit League, Horizon League, Metro Atlantic Athletic Conference and America East Conference.

Prior to this, Boyages was Associate Commissioner for the Mid-American Conference (MAC), which he joined in 2005 after stints as Special Assistant to the Athletic Director at Ohio State University in its 2004–05 academic year, and as Head Men’s Basketball Coach for the William & Mary Tribe men's basketball team from 2000 to 2003. He compiled a 33–52 overall record (21–31 in the CAA) during his three seasons as William & Mary's coach.

Boyages started his coaching career at Bates College in Lewiston, Maine, where he coached for four seasons. In 1987, he became Bates' Head Men’s Basketball Coach at age 25, becoming the nation's youngest collegiate head coach. His NCAA Division I coaching career began with Boston College in 1991, following his years at Bates. He also spent two separate stints as the Associate Head Coach for the Ohio State Men’s Basketball (1998–2000 and 2003–2004). Boyages coached in five NCAA Tournaments including an Elite Eight appearance with Boston College in 1994, and a Final Four with Ohio State University in 1999.

A native of Wakefield, Massachusetts, Boyages is a 1985 graduate of Bowdoin College in Brunswick, Maine, where he was a studio art major and a basketball team captain. At his graduation, he received the college's Andrew Allison Haldane Cup for outstanding leadership and character. He earned a master's degree in education from Boston University. Boyages has also coached with international Basketball Federations in Czechia, Greece and Burundi. He was inducted into the New England Basketball Hall of Fame in Glastonbury, Connecticut, in 2009.
