= 1957–58 West Virginia Mountaineers men's basketball team =

American college basketball season

1957–58 West Virginia Mountaineers men's basketball

NCAA regular season champions Southern Conference champions

NCAA Men's Division I Tournament, First Round
- Conference: Southern Conference

Ranking
- Coaches: No. 1
- AP: No. 1
- Record: 26–2 ( SoCon)
- Head coach: Fred Schaus
- Home arena: WVU Field House

1957–58 Southern Conference men's basketball standings
	Conf.				Overall
Team	W		L	PCT	W		L	PCT
No. 1 West Virginia †	12	–	0	1.000	26	–	2	.929
Virginia Tech	10	–	5	.667	11	–	8	.579
George Washington	8	–	4	.667	12	–	11	.522
The Citadel	9	–	6	.600	16	–	11	.593
Richmond	8	–	8	.500	14	–	12	.538
William & Mary	9	–	9	.500	15	–	14	.517
Furman	4	–	8	.333	10	–	16	.385
Davidson	4	–	8	.333	9	–	15	.375
Washington and Lee	4	–	9	.308	9	–	16	.360
VMI	1	–	12	.077	4	–	17	.190
† Southern Conference Tournament winner Rankings from AP Poll

The 1957–58 West Virginia Mountaineers men's basketball team represented West Virginia University in NCAA competition in the 1957–58 season. Coached by Fred Schaus and featuring future Hall of Fame guard Jerry West, the Mountaineers, then a member of the Southern Conference, lost in the first round of that year's NCAA tournament to Manhattan.

== NCAA basketball tournament ==
- East
  - Manhattan 89, West Virginia 84

== Team players drafted into the NBA ==
Round	Pick	Player	NBA club
2	13	Lloyd Sharrar	Philadelphia Warriors
