= 2000–01 William & Mary Tribe men's basketball team =

American college basketball season

2000–01 William & Mary Tribe men's basketball
- Conference: Colonial Athletic Association
- Record: 11–17 (7–9 CAA)
- Head coach: Rick Boyages (1st season)
- Home arena: Kaplan Arena

The 2000–01 William & Mary Tribe men's basketball team represented The College of William & Mary during the 2000–01 college basketball season. This was head coach Rick Boyages' first season at William & Mary. The Tribe competed in the Colonial Athletic Association and played their home games at Kaplan Arena. They finished the season 11–17, 7–9 and in fifth place in CAA play. They then lost in the preliminary rounds of the 2001 CAA men's basketball tournament to Old Dominion. They did not participate in any post-season tournaments.
