= Jim Moran (basketball) =

American-Irish basketball player and coach (born 1978)

Florida State Seminoles
- Title: Associate head coach
- League: Atlantic Coast Conference

Personal information
- Born: December 3, 1978 (age 47) Syosset, New York, U.S.
- Listed height: 6 ft 7 in (2.01 m)
- Listed weight: 227 lb (103 kg)

Career information
- High school: St. Dominic (Oyster Bay, New York)
- College: William & Mary (1997–2001)
- NBA draft: 2001: undrafted
- Playing career: 2001–2011
- Position: Small forward
- Coaching career: 2015–present

Career history

Playing
- 2001–2011: Gran Canaria

Coaching
- 2015–2021: Portland Trail Blazers (assistant)
- 2021–2023: Detroit Pistons (assistant)
- 2023–2024: Rip City Remix
- 2024–2025: Sacramento Kings (assistant)
- 2025–present: Florida State (associate HC)

Career highlights
- As player: 5× Copa Toyota champion (2003–2007); 2× Second-team All-CAA (2000, 2001); No. 20 retired by Gran Canaria

James Timothy Moran (born December 3, 1978) is an American-Irish former professional basketball player and current coach who is the associate head coach of the Florida State Seminoles of the Atlantic Coast Conference.

== Playing career ==
Moran was born in Syosset, New York and attended St. Dominic High School in Oyster Bay from 1993 to 1997. He played on a state championship team during his prep years. After graduating, Moran played four years of college basketball at William & Mary (1997–2001) where he scored 1,324 points and was a two-time All-Colonial Athletic Association (CAA) Team member in his junior and senior seasons.

Moran played his entire professional career for CB Gran Canaria in Spain's Liga ACB (2001 to 2011). On April 21, 2013, Moran became the only player in Gran Canaria history to have his jersey retired. In 10 seasons with the team he recorded 2,060 points, 802 rebounds and 321 assists in 7,452 minutes.

Moran has also competed for Ireland's national team.

== Coaching career ==
In November 2013, Moran began his coaching career as a player development coach for the NBA Development League's Maine Red Claws. He then became the Portland Trail Blazers' associate video coordinator for the 2014–15 season. The Trail Blazers finished that season with a 51–31 record, a Northwest Division championship, and a berth into the Western Conference playoffs as a fourth-seed. Moran was promoted to be a full-time assistant coach upon the start of the 2015–16 season. He then spent the next six years with Portland, but was fired as part of a wholesale coaching staff change at the conclusion of the 2020–21 season. Moran was hired soon thereafter as a top assistant for the Detroit Pistons.

On June 15, 2023, Moran was named the first ever head coach of the Rip City Remix, Portland's G League affiliate.

On July 25, 2024, Moran joined the Sacramento Kings as an assistant coach and on September 9, he was officially named an assistant coach.

On April 21, 2025, Moran was hired to serve as an assistant coach at Florida State under head coach Luke Loucks.
