= Bill Chambers (basketball) =

American basketball player and coach

Personal information
- Born: December 13, 1930 Lynchburg, Virginia, U.S.
- Died: July 11, 2017 (aged 86) Alexander City, Alabama, U.S.
- Listed height: 6 ft 4 in (1.93 m)

Career information
- High school: E. C. Glass (Lynchburg, Virginia)
- College: William & Mary (1950–1953)
- NBA draft: 1953: – round, –
- Drafted by: Minneapolis Lakers
- Position: Center
- Number: 32

Career history

Coaching
- 1953–1954: Warwick HS
- 1954–1957: Newport News HS
- 1957–1966: William & Mary

Career highlights
- NCAA record for rebounds in a game (51); 2× Second-team All-SoCon (1952, 1953); No. 32 retired by William & Mary Tribe
- Stats at Basketball Reference

William B. Chambers (December 13, 1930 – July 11, 2017) was an American college basketball player and coach for the William & Mary Tribe.

== Playing career ==
=== High school ===
He attended E. C. Glass High School in Lynchburg, Virginia where he led his team to a state championship and an undefeated season (22–0) during his senior year.

=== William & Mary ===
Chambers then went on to play collegiately for the College of William & Mary in Williamsburg, Virginia from 1950 to 1953. He earned all-state, All-Southern Conference and Helms All-American status while playing for the Tribe. On February 14 of his senior year, Chambers set an NCAA single game rebound record of 51 against the University of Virginia. It is a record that still stands to this day. He was also selected as Virginia's Outstanding Collegiate Basketball Player that same year.

Chambers ended his William & Mary career with 1,456 points. He also set the Virginia schools' record for rebounds in a single season when he grabbed 509 in 1951–52. His jersey number (#32) was retired and now hangs in the rafters of Kaplan Arena.

=== NBA ===
In the 1953 NBA draft, Chambers was selected by the Minneapolis Lakers as their 11th pick. Despite the selection, he was cut by the Lakers during preseason.

== Coaching career ==
In 1957, Chambers returned to his alma mater to coach his former team after several years of highly successful high school coaching. Over the course of the next nine seasons (six of which were winning years), he compiled at 113–110 career record, a win total not surpassed by any other W&M men's basketball coach until Tony Shaver passed the mark in February 2013. The most notable win during his tenure was on January 30, 1960, when his unranked Tribe defeated No. 4 West Virginia University 94–86. The win broke the Mountaineers' 56-game Southern Conference winning streak. For his accomplishments, Chambers has been inducted into the William & Mary Hall of Fame. In 1995, Chambers was also inducted into the Virginia Sports Hall of Fame.

=== Head coaching record ===
Record table
Season	Team	Overall	Conference	Standing	Postseason
William & Mary Indians (Southern Conference) (1957–1966)
1957–58	William & Mary	15–14	9–9	5th	
1958–59	William & Mary	13–11	7–7	4th	
1959–60	William & Mary	15–11	10–5	3rd	
1960–61	William & Mary	14–10	9–6	4th	
1961–62	William & Mary	7–17	5–11	T–8th	
1962–63	William & Mary	15–9	10–5	3rd	
1963–64	William & Mary	9–13	5–9	7th	
1964–65	William & Mary	12–13	6–8	6th	
1965–66	William & Mary	13–12	8–3	3rd	
William & Mary:		113–110 (.507)	69–63 (.523)		
Total:		113–110 (.507)			

== Later years and death ==
After retiring from coaching in 1966, Chambers worked in sales and management for the Converse shoe company and later became a salesman of sporting goods in Florida. In 1990, he was appointed vice president of sales for Russell Athletic.

Chambers died on July 11, 2017, in Alexander City, Alabama, following a lengthy battle with Parkinson's disease. He was 86.

== See also ==
- List of NCAA Division I men's basketball players with 30 or more rebounds in a game
