= 1978–79 William & Mary Tribe men's basketball team =

American college basketball season

1978–79 William & Mary Tribe men's basketball
- Conference: Independent
- Record: 9–17
- Head coach: Bruce Parkhill (2nd season)
- Home arena: William & Mary Hall

1978–79 NCAA Division I men's basketball independents standings
	Conf.				Overall
Team	W		L	PCT	W		L	PCT
No. 8 Syracuse		–		–	26	–	4	.867
Georgetown		–		–	24	–	5	.828
No. 6 DePaul		–		–	26	–	6	.813
No. 4 Notre Dame		–		–	24	–	6	.800
VCU		–		–	20	–	5	.800
Iona		–		–	23	–	6	.793
Detroit		–		–	22	–	6	.786
Tennessee State		–		–	20	–	6	.769
Old Dominion		–		–	23	–	7	.767
No. 10 Marquette		–		–	22	–	7	.759
Wagner		–		–	21	–	7	.750
Connecticut		–		–	21	–	8	.724
UNLV		–		–	21	–	8	.724
UNC Wilmington		–		–	19	–	8	.704
Boston College		–		–	21	–	9	.700
James Madison		–		–	18	–	8	.692
Rhode Island		–		–	20	–	9	.690
George Mason		–		–	17	–	8	.680
St. Bonaventure		–		–	19	–	9	.679
Illinois State		–		–	20	–	10	.667
St. John's		–		–	21	–	11	.656
Dayton		–		–	19	–	10	.655
Boston University		–		–	17	–	9	.654
Fairfield		–		–	17	–	9	.654
Georgia Tech		–		–	17	–	9	.654
Oral Roberts		–		–	17	–	10	.630
Holy Cross		–		–	17	–	11	.607
Seton Hall		–		–	16	–	11	.593
Cleveland State		–		–	15	–	10	.600
East Tennessee State		–		–	16	–	11	.593
Maine		–		–	14	–	10	.583
UAB		–		–	15	–	11	.577
Army		–		–	14	–	11	.560
Denver		–		–	15	–	12	.556
South Carolina		–		–	15	–	12	.556
Stetson		–		–	15	–	12	.556
Siena		–		–	14	–	12	.538
St. Francis (NY)		–		–	14	–	12	.538
Navy		–		–	13	–	12	.520
Xavier		–		–	14	–	13	.519
Northeastern		–		–	13	–	13	.500
Saint Francis (PA)		–		–	13	–	13	.500
Robert Morris		–		–	13	–	14	.481
Southern Miss		–		–	13	–	14	.481
Air Force		–		–	12	–	13	.480
Long Island University		–		–	12	–	13	.480
Canisius		–		–	12	–	14	.462
Colgate		–		–	12	–	14	.462
Evansville		–		–	13	–	16	.448
East Carolina		–		–	12	–	15	.444
Loyola-Chicago		–		–	12	–	15	.444
Butler		–		–	11	–	16	.407
North Texas State		–		–	11	–	16	.407
Saint Peter's		–		–	10	–	15	.400
Campbell		–		–	10	–	16	.385
New Hampshire		–		–	10	–	16	.385
Providence		–		–	10	–	16	.385
Richmond		–		–	10	–	16	.385
Hawaii		–		–	10	–	17	.370
William & Mary		–		–	9	–	17	.346
Georgia Southern		–		–	9	–	18	.333
Fairleigh Dickinson		–		–	8	–	18	.308
Wisconsin-Milwaukee		–		–	8	–	18	.308
Vermont		–		–	8	–	18	.308
Northwestern State		–		–	7	–	19	.269
Fordham		–		–	7	–	22	.241
Catholic		–		–	6	–	20	.231
Arkansas-Little Rock		–		–	6	–	20	.231
Manhattan		–		–	6	–	20	.231
Niagara		–		–	6	–	20	.231
Portland State		–		–	6	–	21	.222
Baltimore		–		–	4	–	20	.167
Valparaiso		–		–	4	–	21	.160
Baptist		–		–	2	–	25	.074
Rankings from AP Poll

The 1978–79 William & Mary Tribe men's basketball team represented the College of William & Mary in intercollegiate basketball during the 1978–79 season. Under the second year of head coach Bruce Parkhill, the team finished the season 9–17. This was the 74th season of the collegiate basketball program at William & Mary. William & Mary's home games were played at William & Mary Hall. For the second consecutive season, the Tribe played as an Independent. As such, they did not quality for any postseason tournaments.

Starting in 1978, William & Mary athletic teams dropped the nickname Indians in favor of the Tribe.

== Schedule ==
Date time, TV	Rank^{#}	Opponent^{#}	Result	Record	Site city, state
Regular season
11/25/1978*		Delaware Valley	W 86–64	1–0	William & Mary Hall; Williamsburg, VA
11/27/1978*		Christopher Newport	W 66–54	2–0	William & Mary Hall; Williamsburg, VA
11/29/1978*		at West Virginia	L 39–45	2–1	WVU Coliseum; Morgantown, WV
12/2/1978*		East Carolina	W 60–54	3–1	William & Mary Hall; Williamsburg, VA
12/9/1978*		at Virginia Tech	L 59–84	3–2	Cassell Coliseum; Blacksburg, VA
12/29/1978*		vs. VCU; TD Invitational Tournament	L 43–60	3–3	Richmond Coliseum; Richmond, VA
12/30/1978*		vs. Richmond; TD Invitational Tournament	L 62–64 ^{OT}	3–4	Richmond Coliseum; Richmond, VA
1/3/1979*		Muhlenberg	W 80–64	4–4	William & Mary Hall; Williamsburg, VA
1/6/1979*		James Madison	L 55–56	4–5	William & Mary Hall; Williamsburg, VA
1/10/1979*		at Virginia	L 56–95	4–6	William & Mary Hall; Charlottesville, VA
1/13/1979*		at Richmond	L 72–83	4–7	Robins Center; Richmond, VA
1/16/1979*		Virginia Wesleyan	W 67–62	5–7	William & Mary Hall; Williamsburg, VA
1/20/1979*		at Old Dominion	L 42–48	5–8	ODU Fieldhouse; Norfolk, VA
1/24/1979*		at VCU	L 46–67	5–9	Richmond Coliseum; Richmond, VA
1/27/1979*		South Carolina	L 54–62	5–10	William & Mary Hall; Williamsburg, VA
1/30/1979*		at East Carolina	L 59–61 ^{2OT}	5–11	Williams Arena at Minges Coliseum; Greenville, NC
2/1/1979*		Roanoke College	W 44–43	6–11	William & Mary Hall; Williamsburg, VA
2/3/1979*		Navy	W 68–63	7–11	William & Mary Hall; Williamsburg, VA
2/6/1979*		at James Madison	L 57–70	7–12	Harrisonburg, VA
2/8/1979*		Davidson	W 68–62 ^{2OT}	8–12	William & Mary Hall; Williamsburg, VA
2/10/1979*		at American	L 45–61	8–13	Cassell Center; Washington, DC
2/12/1979*		Virginia Tech	L 49–55	8–14	William & Mary Hall; Williamsburg, VA
2/14/1979*		at No. 4 North Carolina	L 60–85	8–15	Carmichael Arena; Chapel Hill, NC
2/17/1979*		Richmond	W 68–64	9–15	William & Mary Hall; Williamsburg, VA
2/21/1979*		Virginia	L 40–44	9–16	William & Mary Hall; Williamsburg, VA
2/24/1979*		Old Dominion	L 56–57	9–17	William & Mary Hall; Williamsburg, VA
*Non-conference game. ^{#}Rankings from AP Poll. (#) Tournament seedings in parentheses.
