= Daniel Dixon (basketball) =

American basketball player and coach (born 1994)

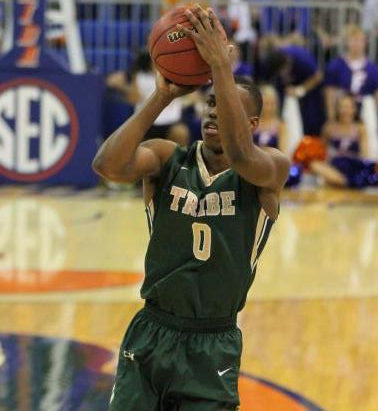
- Dixon shooting for William & Mary in 2014

Oklahoma City Blue
- Title: Head coach
- League: NBA G League

Personal information
- Born: February 13, 1994 (age 32)
- Listed height: 6 ft 6 in (1.98 m)
- Listed weight: 210 lb (95 kg)

Career information
- High school: Langley (McLean, Virginia); Fishburne Military School (Waynesboro, Virginia)
- College: William & Mary (2013–2017)
- NBA draft: 2017: undrafted
- Playing career: 2017–2020
- Position: Shooting guard
- Coaching career: 2022–present

Career history

Playing
- 2017–2018: Maine Red Claws
- 2018: JL Bourg
- 2018–2019: Northern Arizona Suns
- 2020: Windy City Bulls

Coaching
- 2022–2024: Oklahoma City Blue (assistant)
- 2024–2025: Oklahoma City Thunder (assistant)
- 2025–present: Oklahoma City Blue

Career highlights
- As player: First-team All-CAA (2017); As assistant coach: NBA Champion (2025); NBA G League champion (2024)
- Stats at Basketball Reference

Daniel Dixon (born February 13, 1994) is an American professional basketball coach who currently serves as the head coach for the Oklahoma City Blue of the NBA G League. He played college basketball for William & Mary, and played professionally in the NBA G League. He won the 2025 NBA Finals as an assistant coach with the Oklahoma City Thunder.

== Early life ==
Dixon competed for Langley High School in Virginia. As a senior, he averaged 18 points per game. Despite his high scoring, he drew interest from only one college, so he decided to enroll at Fishburne Military School as a postgraduate. At Fishburne, he was the best defensive player and received scholarship offers from Northeastern, Elon and William & Mary, selecting William & Mary.

== College career ==
As a freshman, Dixon missed five games with an injury and averaged 3.5 points per game. Dixon scored 11.1 points per game as a sophomore at William & Mary as a complementary option to Marcus Thornton. Dixon hit 70 three-pointers and contributed 12.5 points per game as a junior, guiding the team to a 20–11 record. On December 29, 2016, he scored a career-high 36 points in a 65–54 win over Old Dominion, shooting 5 of 7 from 3-point range. As a senior, Dixon averaged 19.2 points, 4.7 rebounds and 2.5 assists per game, shooting 37.8 percent from the three-point arc. He was named to the first-team All-CAA.

== Professional career ==
Dixon signed with the Boston Celtics on August 19, 2017, but was waived on October 12 without appearing in a game. Instead, he joined the Maine Red Claws of the NBA G League and had two 20-point outings in his first five matches. While with the Red Claws, he was noted for his versatility and ability to guard all five positions. However, he was hampered by a groin injury and missed four games with a concussion. On January 17, 2018, Dixon scoring 22 points, pulled down seven rebounds, made two steals and dished out three assists in a 113–107 loss to the Westchester Knicks. Dixon posted a triple-double against the Delaware Blue Coats. In the second to last game of the season, he scored 29 points on 11-of-21 shooting. He averaged 13.3 points, 4.8 rebounds and 2.7 assists per game in his rookie season. Dixon joined the Boston Celtics in the 2018 NBA Summer League.

On August 20, 2018, he signed with JL Bourg Basket of the French LNB Pro A but had a mutual agreement to leave the team on October 1, 2018. Dixon was traded by the Red Claws to the Northern Arizona Suns on October 19 in exchange for Archie Goodwin. He did not play in the season opener versus the Santa Cruz Warriors with an ankle injury. Dixon averaged 8.9 points, 3.8 boards and 2.2 assists per game in the 2018–19 season. He re-signed with the Northern Arizona Suns on January 7, 2020. He was later claimed off waivers by the Windy City Bulls on January 26, 2020.

== Coaching career ==
Dixon retired from playing professional basketball in 2020. He then joined the Charlotte Hornets as a basketball operations intern for the 2020–21 season. He was promoted to be their assistant video coordinator for the 2021–22 season. In July 2022, Dixon went to the G League's Oklahoma City Blue to become an assistant coach. During the summer of 2024, Dixon served as the Head Coach of the Oklahoma City Thunder during the Las Vegas Summer League. In July 2024, Dixon was promoted to the Oklahoma City Thunder to become an assistant coach; with the team, he won the 2025 NBA Finals.

On August 28, 2025, Dixon was promoted to serve as the head coach for the Oklahoma City Blue of the NBA G League.

== Head coaching record ==
=== G League ===
Team	Year	G	W	L	W–L%	Finish	PG	PW	PL	PW–L%	Result
Oklahoma City	2025–26	36	12	24	.333	13th in Western	—	—	—	—	Missed playoffs
Career		36	12	24	.333		—	—	—	—	

== Personal life ==
Dixon's father David is a vice president at Wells Fargo and ran track at Boston University. His mother Terri was a former cheerleader for the New England Patriots and works for Lockheed Martin. His brother Darren is a managing director at Goldman Sachs and was named to Forbes' 30 Under 30 in 2016. Another brother Damon ran track at Hampton University and works as a senior consultant at Capgemini. His third brother Darwin works for Freddie Mac as a data analyst.
