= 1954–55 William & Mary Indians men's basketball team =

American college basketball season

1954–55 William & Mary Indians men's basketball
- Conference: Southern Conference
- Record: 11–14 (7–5 SoCon)
- Head coach: Boydson Baird (3rd season)
- Home arena: Blow Gymnasium

1954–55 Southern Conference men's basketball standings
	Conf.				Overall
Team	W		L	PCT	W		L	PCT
No. 19 West Virginia †	9	–	1	.900	19	–	11	.633
No. 14 George Washington	8	–	2	.800	24	–	6	.800
Richmond	10	–	4	.714	19	–	9	.679
Washington and Lee	8	–	5	.615	16	–	13	.552
Furman	6	–	4	.600	17	–	10	.630
William & Mary	7	–	5	.583	11	–	14	.440
Davidson	4	–	6	.400	8	–	13	.381
VMI	4	–	9	.308	8	–	15	.348
Virginia Tech	4	–	14	.222	7	–	20	.259
The Citadel	0	–	10	.000	0	–	17	.000
† Southern Conference Tournament winner Rankings from AP Poll

The 1954–55 William & Mary Indians men's basketball team represented the College of William & Mary in intercollegiate basketball during the 1954–55 NCAA men's basketball season. Under the third year of head coach Boydson Baird, the team finished the season 11–14, 7–5 in the Southern Conference. This was the 50th season of the collegiate basketball program at William & Mary, whose nickname is now the Tribe. William & Mary played its home games at Blow Gymnasium.

The Indians finished in 6th place in the conference and qualified for the 1955 Southern Conference men's basketball tournament, held at the Richmond Arena. However, William & Mary fell to Richmond in the quarterfinals.

== Program notes ==
- William & Mary played two teams for the first time this season: Tennessee and Vanderbilt.
- The Indians competed in their first-ever regular season tournament or invitational when they took part in the UR Invitational, hosted by the University of Richmond, at Richmond Arena in December 1954.

== Schedule ==
Date time, TV	Rank^{#}	Opponent^{#}	Result	Record	Site city, state
Regular season
12/1/1954*		NC State	L 97–111	0–1	Blow Gymnasium; Williamsburg, VA
12/4/1954		at Furman	W 103–101	1–1 (1–0)	Old Textile Hall; Greenville, SC
12/6/1954*		at Tennessee	L 79–91	1–2	Alumni Memorial Gym; Knoxville, TN
*		Hampden–Sydney	W 108–76	2–2	Blow Gymnasium; Williamsburg, VA
*		North Carolina	W 79–76	3–2	Blow Gymnasium; Williamsburg, VA
12/17/1954*		at Seton Hall	L 89–109	3–3	Walsh Gymnasium; South Orange, NJ
12/28/1954*		vs. Boston University; UR Invitational	W 84–74	4–3	Richmond Arena; Richmond, VA
12/29/1954*		vs. No. 9 George Washington; UR Invitational	L 53–65	4–4	Richmond Arena; Richmond, VA
*		vs. VPI; UR Invitational	W 82–67	5–4	Richmond Arena; Richmond, VA
1/3/1955*		at Vanderbilt	L 61–86	5–5	Memorial Gymnasium; Nashville, TN
1/5/1955*		at Navy	L 56–77	5–6	Dahlgren Hall; Annapolis, MD
		Washington and Lee	W 78–73	6–6 (2–0)	Blow Gymnasium; Williamsburg, VA
		at No. 8 George Washington	L 65–79	6–7 (2–1)	Washington, DC
1/15/1955		at No. 13 Richmond	L 71–92	6–8 (2–2)	Richmond Arena; Richmond, VA
		at VPI	W 75–69	7–8 (3–2)	War Memorial Gymnasium; Blacksburg, VA
		at VMI	W 88–68	8–8 (4–2)	Cormack Field House; Lexington, VA
2/5/1955*		No. 12 Maryland	L 62–67	8–9	Blow Gymnasium; Williamsburg, VA
		VPI	W 105–73	9–9 (5–2)	Blow Gymnasium; Williamsburg, VA
2/9/1955*		No. 7 NC State	L 99–126	9–10	Blow Gymnasium; Williamsburg, VA
2/12/1955		VMI	W 89–66	10–10 (6–2)	Blow Gymnasium; Williamsburg, VA
2/14/1955		vs. West Virginia	L 81–95	10–11 (6–3)	Parkersburg, WV
		Washington and Lee	L 67–86	10–12 (6–4)	Blow Gymnasium; Williamsburg, VA
		at No. 10 George Washington	L 76–119	10–13 (6–5)	Washington, DC
2/26/1955		at Richmond	W 93–78	11–13 (7–5)	Richmond Arena; Richmond, VA
1955 Southern Conference Basketball Tournament
3/3/1955		vs. (3) Richmond; Quarterfinals	L 75–90	11–14	Richmond Arena; Richmond, VA
*Non-conference game. ^{#}Rankings from AP Poll. (#) Tournament seedings in parentheses.
