= Andy Van Vliet =

Belgian basketball player (born 1995)

No. 81 – Rostock Seawolves
- Position: Center / power forward
- League: Basketball Bundesliga

Personal information
- Born: 27 July 1995 (age 31) Brasschaat, Belgium
- Listed height: 7 ft 0 in (2.13 m)
- Listed weight: 231 lb (105 kg)

Career information
- High school: Canarias Basketball Academy (Tenerife, Spain)
- College: Wisconsin (2015–2018); William & Mary (2019–2020)
- NBA draft: 2020: undrafted
- Playing career: 2014–present

Career history
- 2014–2015: Antwerp Giants
- 2020–2021: Šiauliai
- 2021–2023: Bnei Herzliya
- 2023–2024: Trefl Sopot
- 2025: Maroussi
- 2025: BCM Gravelines-Dunkerque
- 2025–present: Rostock Seawolves

Career highlights
- PLK champion (2024); Third-team All-CAA (2020)

Andy Van Vliet (born 27 July 1995) is a Belgian professional basketball player for Rostock Seawolves of the German Basketball Bundesliga. He played college basketball for the University of Wisconsin and the College of William & Mary. He plays at the power forward and center positions.

== Early and personal life ==
Van Vliet was born in Brasschaat, Belgium, and his hometown is Antwerp, Belgium. He speaks Dutch, French, English, and German. He is 7 ft 0 in (213 cm) tall, and weighs 231 pounds (105 kg).

He played as an amateur for the Antwerp Giants on its B team in 2013–15. Van Vilet would make brief appearances with the senior team mainly during the 2014–2015 season including games against Enisey and Trabzonspor in the EuroChallenge. Van Vliet also played on the Belgian Youth National Basketball Team, and competed in the European Championship on its U16, U18 and the U20 team in July 2015. He averaged 5.8 points and 5.2 rebounds per game during the 2015 European Championship.

Van Vliet attended Canarias Basketball Academy in Spain for high school.

== College career ==
Van Vliet first attended the University of Wisconsin, where he studied Sociology and played for the Badgers in the Big Ten Conference. He was the sixth 7-footer in team history. In his freshman season in 2015–16, he sat out the season after the NCAA ruled him ineligible for not enrolling in college within a year of his high school graduation.

In his sophomore season in 2016–17, Van Vliet played only 3.4 minutes a game, during which he averaged 1.3 points and 1.4 rebounds. In his junior season in 2017–18, he averaged 3.4 points and 1.4 rebounds per game.

After transferring from Wisconsin to the College of William & Mary ('20), where he earned a degree in kinesiology and played for the Tribe in the Colonial Athletic Association (CAA), Van Vliet sat out his junior season in 2018–19 as a redshirt due to NCAA transfer rules.

In his senior season in 2019–20, Van Vliet ranked second in the CAA in blocks per game (1.3), third in defensive rebounds (7.3), fourth in overall rebounds (8.7), fifth in field goal percentage (.461), and 13th in scoring (13.2). He ranked 17th nationally in defensive rebounds, 61st in overall rebounds, and 77th in rebounds per game. He was named CAA Player of the Week on November 18. He was named All-CAA Third Team.

== Professional career ==
In 2020 he started his professional career with BC Šiauliai in the Lithuanian Basketball League, averaging 11.1 points, 5.8 rebounds (10th in the league), and 0.6 blocks per game.

In 2021 Van Vliet joined the Israeli team Bnei Herzliya Basket in the Israeli Basketball Premier League, for whom he played both power forward and center.

On 1 August 2023 he signed with Trefl Sopot of the Polish Basketball League (PLK).

On 1 January 2025 Van Vliet joined the Greek club Maroussi.

On June 21, 2025, he signed with Rostock Seawolves of Basketball Bundesliga (BBL).

== International play ==
In 2020 Van Vliet was called up to the Belgian Lions national basketball team for the first time.
