= 1957–58 William & Mary Indians men's basketball team =

American college basketball season

1957–58 William & Mary Indians men's basketball
- Conference: Southern Conference
- Record: 15–14 (9–9 SoCon)
- Head coach: Bill Chambers (1st season)
- Home arena: Blow Gymnasium

1957–58 Southern Conference men's basketball standings
	Conf.				Overall
Team	W		L	PCT	W		L	PCT
No. 1 West Virginia †	12	–	0	1.000	26	–	2	.929
Virginia Tech	10	–	5	.667	11	–	8	.579
George Washington	8	–	4	.667	12	–	11	.522
The Citadel	9	–	6	.600	16	–	11	.593
Richmond	8	–	8	.500	14	–	12	.538
William & Mary	9	–	9	.500	15	–	14	.517
Furman	4	–	8	.333	10	–	16	.385
Davidson	4	–	8	.333	9	–	15	.375
Washington and Lee	4	–	9	.308	9	–	16	.360
VMI	1	–	12	.077	4	–	17	.190
† Southern Conference Tournament winner Rankings from AP Poll

The 1957–58 William & Mary Indians men's basketball team represented the College of William & Mary in intercollegiate basketball during the 1957–58 NCAA University Division men's basketball season. Under the first year of head coach Bill Chambers, the team finished the season 15–14, 9–9 in the Southern Conference. This was the 53rd season of the collegiate basketball program at William & Mary, whose nickname is now the Tribe. William & Mary played its home games at Blow Gymnasium.

The Indians finished in 6th place in the conference and qualified for the 1958 Southern Conference men's basketball tournament, held at the Richmond Arena. In a surprising run, William & Mary defeated #2 VPI in the quarterfinals and #3 George Washington in the semifinals before losing in the championship game to top-seeded West Virginia. This was the first of eight times that the Indians played in the championship game of a conference tournament.

== Program notes ==
- William & Mary played two teams for the first time this season: Evansville and Murray State.
- William & Mary's appearance in the Southern Conference championship game would be the first of nine such appearances (the others came in 1961, 1965, 1975, 1983, 2008, 2010, 2014, and 2015).
- On February 10, the Indians played their first-ever game against a team ranked #1 in the AP poll, losing 68–82 at West Virginia.
- Roy Lange was named to the first team all-Southern Conference.

== Schedule ==
Date time, TV	Rank^{#}	Opponent^{#}	Result	Record	Site city, state
Regular season
*		Virginia	W 73–69	1–0	Blow Gymnasium; Williamsburg, VA
12/4/1957*		at Penn	L 70–86	1–1	Palestra; Philadelphia, PA
		George Washington	W 71–60	2–1 (1–0)	Blow Gymnasium; Williamsburg, VA
		at The Citadel	L 60–75	2–2 (1–1)	The Citadel Armory; Charleston, SC
		at The Citadel	L 63–85	2–3 (1–2)	The Citadel Armory; Charleston, SC
12/13/1957		vs. No. 8 West Virginia	L 52–68	2–4 (1–3)	Logan, WV
*		at Evansville	L 65–83	2–5	Roberts Municipal Stadium; Evansville, IN
*		at Murray State	W 76–66	3–5	Racer Arena; Murray, KY
12/30/1957*		at Tennessee	L 62–84	3–6	Alumni Memorial Gym; Knoxville, TN
*		at No. 3 North Carolina	L 63–79	3–7	Woollen Gymnasium; Chapel Hill, NC
1/11/1958		at Richmond	W 72–66	4–7 (2–3)	Richmond Arena; Richmond, VA
		Davidson	W 75–61	5–7 (3–3)	Blow Gymnasium; Williamsburg, VA
		at George Washington	L 80–91	5–8 (3–4)	Uline Arena; Washington, DC
		VPI	L 75–87	5–9 (3–5)	Blow Gymnasium; Williamsburg, VA
2/1/1958		at Furman	L 73–89	5–10 (3–6)	Old Textile Hall; Greenville, SC
		at Davidson	W 72–53	6–10 (4–6)	Johnston Gym; Davidson, NC
*		Hampden–Sydney	W 85–59	7–10	Blow Gymnasium; Williamsburg, VA
2/8/1958*		vs. Navy	W 90–78	8–10	Norfolk Municipal Auditorium; Norfolk, VA
2/10/1958		at No. 1 West Virginia	L 68–82	8–11 (4–7)	WVU Field House; Morgantown, WV
		at VMI	W 79–61	9–11 (5–7)	Cormack Field House; Lexington, VA
		at Washington and Lee	W 86–84	10–11 (6–7)	Doremus Gymnasium; Lexington, VA
2/17/1958		Furman	W 87–46	11–11 (7–7)	Blow Gymnasium; Williamsburg, VA
2/21/1958		Washington and Lee	W 88–72	12–11 (8–7)	Blow Gymnasium; Williamsburg, VA
		VMI	W 96–78	13–11 (9–7)	Blow Gymnasium; Williamsburg, VA
		at VPI	L 68–72	13–12 (9–8)	War Memorial Gymnasium; Blacksburg, VA
3/1/1958		Richmond	L 67–79 ^{3OT}	13–13 (9–9)	Blow Gymnasium; Williamsburg, VA
1958 Southern Conference Basketball Tournament
3/6/1958		vs. (2) VPI; Quarterfinals	W 79–61	14–13	Richmond Arena; Richmond, VA
3/7/1958		vs. (3) George Washington; Semifinals	W 57–56	15–13	Richmond Arena; Richmond, VA
3/8/1958		vs. No. 2 (1) West Virginia; Championship	L 58–74	15–14	Richmond Arena; Richmond, VA
*Non-conference game. ^{#}Rankings from AP Poll. (#) Tournament seedings in parentheses.
