= Terry Tarpey =

French-American basketball player

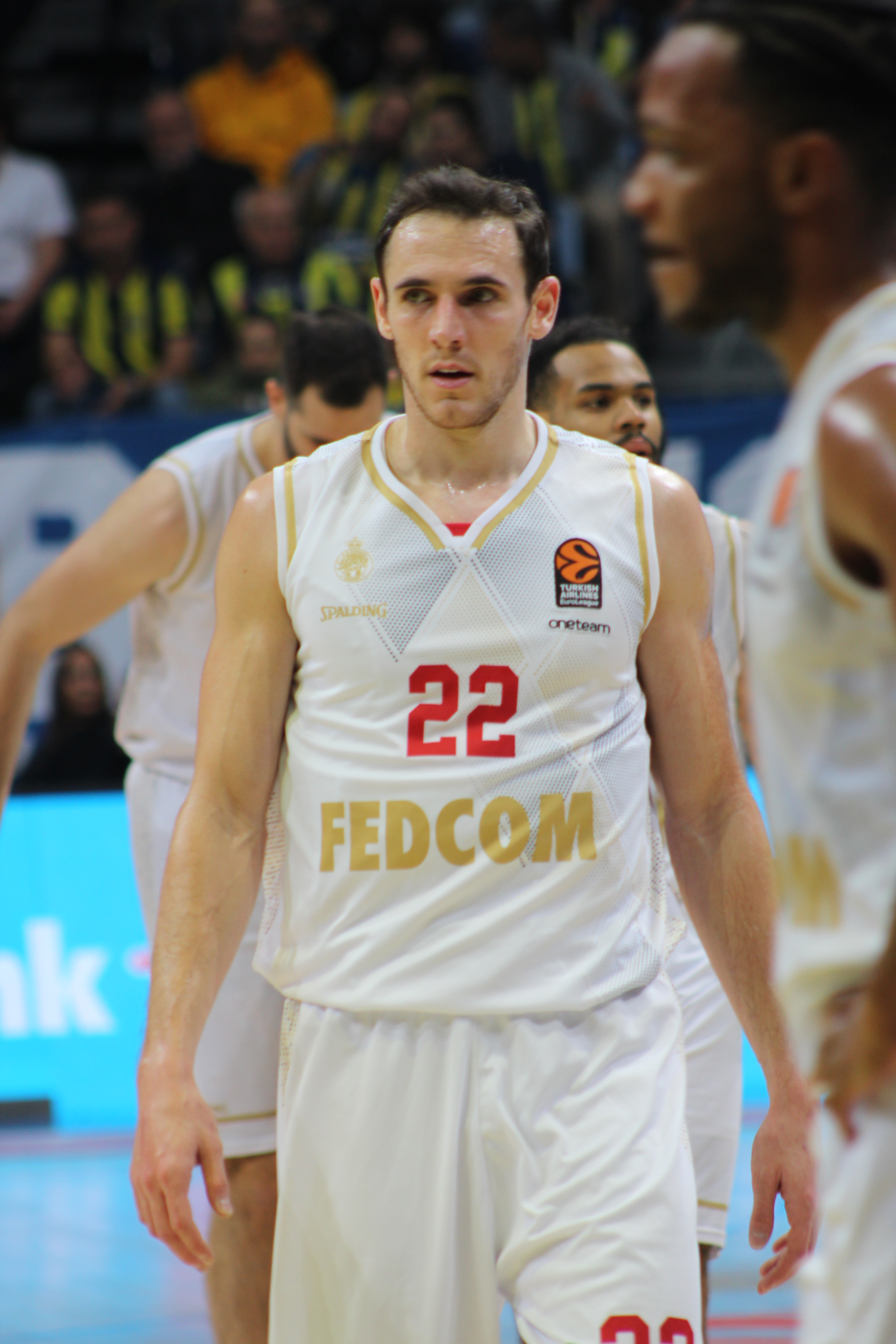
- Tarpey with Monaco in 2024

No. 3 – Paris Basketball
- Position: Small forward
- League: LNB Élite; EuroLeague

Personal information
- Born: March 2, 1994 (age 32) Poissy, France
- Listed height: 6 ft 5 in (1.96 m)
- Listed weight: 210 lb (95 kg)

Career information
- High school: Fairfield College Prep (Fairfield, Connecticut)
- College: William & Mary (2012–2016)
- NBA draft: 2016: undrafted
- Playing career: 2016–present

Career history
- 2016–2017: Denain Voltaire
- 2017–2023: Le Mans Sarthe
- 2023–2026: AS Monaco
- 2026–present: Paris Basketball

Career highlights
- 3× French League champion (2018, 2024, 2026); French Cup winner (2026); French League Cup winner (2026); French Supercup winner (2025); 2× Second-team All-CAA (2015, 2016); 2× CAA Defensive Player of the Year (2015, 2016); 2× CAA All-Defensive Team (2015, 2016)

Terence "Terry" Tarpey III (born March 2, 1994) is a French–American professional basketball player for Paris Basketball of the French LNB Élite and the EuroLeague. He also represents the French national team in international competition. Tarpey played college basketball with the William & Mary Tribe.

== Early life ==
Born in Poissy, Tarpey spent his first three years in Le Mans where his father was playing professionally. He is the son of Terence "Terry" Tarpey Jr., an American-French former professional basketball player who spent most of his career playing in France. He is of Lithuanian descent through a grandparent. At the age of four, Tarpey moved with his family to New York City before settling in Stamford, Connecticut. Before choosing to focus on basketball, Tarpey also played baseball and football. Standing at 6 ft 5 in (1.96 m), Tapey possesses a 6 ft 10 in (2.08 m) wingspan.

== High school and college career ==
Tarpey attended and played basketball at Fairfield Prep in Connecticut. As a senior, he averaged 25.6 points per game, leading Fairfield Prep to the Class LL and SCC semifinals. In May 2011, Tarpey committed to play college basketball at the College of William & Mary. He was twice named the best defender in the Colonial Athletic Association. As a junior, Tarpey posted 11.8 points, 8.4 rebounds, 1.8 steals, and 1.3 blocks per game. Tarpey was the first William & Mary player to record a triple-double with 18 points, 11 rebounds and 10 assists against James Madison in 2015. As a senior, he averaged 10.4 points and 7.8 rebounds per game.

== Professional career ==
=== Denain Voltaire (2016–2017) ===
After going undrafted in the 2016 NBA draft, Tarpey signed with Denain Voltaire of the French second division LNB Pro B on August 7, 2016.

=== Le Mans Sarthe (2017–2023) ===
On May 31, 2017, Tarpey signed a two-year deal with Le Mans Sarthe of the LNB Pro A, a club his father played for in the 1990s. In the 2017–18 season, Tarpey helped Le Mans win their fifth French league title, the first in 12 years. He averaged 6.8 points, 4.8 rebounds, two assists and 1.3 steals per game. On May 5, 2021, Tarpey extended his contract with the club until 2024.

=== AS Monaco (2023–2026) ===
On June 22, 2023, Tarpey signed a three-year contract with AS Monaco of the LNB Pro A and the EuroLeague.

=== Paris Basketball (2026–present) ===
On June 30, 2026, Tarpey signed with Paris Basketball of the LNB Élite and the EuroLeague.

== National team career ==
Tarpey was named to the 12-man France National A team in 2016. In November 2021, Tarpey made his France senior national team debut during the qualifying rounds for the 2023 FIBA World Cup. In August 2022, he was selected to the final squad for the EuroBasket 2022 championship. Tarpey averaged 5.4 points on 64 percent shooting, 4.3 rebounds, 1.6 assists and 1.7 steals, helping the French team to a silver medal.

== Career statistics ==
Legend
GP	Games played	GS	Games started	MPG	Minutes per game
FG%	Field-goal percentage	3P%	3-point field-goal percentage	FT%	Free-throw percentage
RPG	Rebounds per game	APG	Assists per game	SPG	Steals per game
BPG	Blocks per game	PPG	Points per game	PIR	Performance index rating
**Bold**	Career high

=== EuroLeague ===
Year	Team	GP	GS	MPG	FG%	3P%	FT%	RPG	APG	SPG	BPG	PPG	PIR
2023–24	Monaco	6	2	10.0	.250	.500	1.000	1.2	.8	.5	.2	1.2	0.5
Career		6	2	10.0	.250	.500	1.000	1.2	.8	.5	.2	1.2	0.5

=== Basketball Champions League ===
Year	Team	GP	GS	MPG	FG%	3P%	FT%	RPG	APG	SPG	BPG	PPG
2018–19	Le Mans	14	9	21.3	.448	.360	.714	4.1	1.4	1.5	.4	4.7
Career		14	9	21.3	.448	.360	.714	4.1	1.4	1.5	.4	4.7

=== Domestic leagues ===
Year	Team	League	GP	MPG	FG%	3P%	FT%	RPG	APG	SPG	BPG	PPG
2016–17	(France) Denain Voltaire	Pro B	34	22.0	.488	.392	.797	4.9	2.3	1.4	.6	8.3
2017–18	(France) Le Mans	Pro A	26	23.6	.426	.393	.742	4.8	2.0	1.3	.4	6.8
2018–19	(France) Le Mans	LNB Élite	27	19.5	.429	.241	.571	3.5	1.3	1.0	.6	3.6
2019–20	(France) Le Mans	LNB Élite	20	24.1	.484	.314	.744	4.7	1.6	1.3	.4	8.5
2020–21	(France) Le Mans	LNB Élite	33	27.0	.548	.371	.803	5.7	2.6	1.4	.7	8.1
2021–22	(France) Le Mans	LNB Élite	27	23.9	.506	.349	.878	5.6	2.8	1.7	.7	8.5
2022–23	(France) Le Mans	LNB Élite	28	24.9	.500	.449	.839	4.8	3.2	1.4	.5	8.7
2023–24	(France) Monaco	LNB Élite	25	19.1	.356	.362	.769	3.8	1.4	1.1	.7	4.6

=== College ===
Year	Team	GP	GS	MPG	FG%	3P%	FT%	RPG	APG	SPG	BPG	PPG
2012–13	William & Mary	30	3	14.8	.346	.174	.636	3.7	1.2	.5	.5	2.7
2013–14	William & Mary	**32**	31	24.8	**.540**	.250	.627	6.1	1.8	1.1	.8	5.4
2014–15	William & Mary	**32**	**32**	**31.3**	.530	**.343**	**.824**	**8.4**	**3.2**	1.8	**1.3**	**11.8**
2015–16	William & Mary	30	30	30.2	.489	.258	.789	7.8	2.5	**2.1**	**1.3**	10.4
Career		124	96	25.3	.496	.281	.745	6.5	2.2	1.4	1.0	7.6
