= Keith Cieplicki =

American basketball player-coach (born 1963)

Personal information
- Born: June 6, 1963 (age 63) Burlington, Vermont, U.S.
- Listed height: 6 ft 4 in (1.93 m)
- Listed weight: 165 lb (75 kg)

Career information
- High school: Rice Memorial (South Burlington, Vermont)
- College: William & Mary (1981–1985)
- NBA draft: 1985: 7th round, 161st overall pick
- Drafted by: Los Angeles Lakers
- Position: Shooting guard

Career history

Coaching
- 1986–1987: Vermont (men's asst.)
- 1987–1991: Rice Mem. HS (boys' HC)
- 1991–1993: Vermont (women's asst.)
- 1993–1995: Boston College (women's asst.)
- 1995–1997: Rice Mem. HS (girls' HC)
- 1997–2003: Vermont
- 2003–2006: Syracuse

Career highlights
- As player: 3× First-team All-ECAC South (1983–1985); No. 14 retired by William & Mary Tribe; As coach: 3× America East regular season champion (1998, 2000, 2002); 2× America East Coach of the Year (2000, 2002)
- Stats at Basketball Reference

Keith Cieplicki (born June 6, 1963) is an American former college basketball player and women's college basketball coach. From 1997 to 2003, he coached at Vermont, where he posted a 127–53 (.705) record. He left Vermont to take the head coaching job at Syracuse. In his three seasons there, he posted a 28–55 overall record. After the 2006 season he resigned. He was named one of the 50 Greatest Sports Figures from Vermont by Sports Illustrated.

== Playing career ==
Cieplicki was the first Vermont high school player to ever score over 2,000 points while at Rice Memorial High School, where he played under his father Bernie Cieplicki Sr. He was a two-time Vermont high school athlete of the year and led Rice to a state title in 1980.

After high school, Cieplicki played college basketball at William & Mary where he was a three-time ECAC South first team all-conference selection and helped the Tribe reach its first-ever postseason tournament with a berth in the 1983 NIT. Through 2020–21, Cieplicki is seventh all-time in scoring with 1,812 points at William & Mary and had his number 14 retired by the school.

Cieplicki was taken in the seventh round by the Los Angeles Lakers in the 1985 NBA draft.

== Coaching career ==
In 1986, Cieplicki returned home and began his coaching career under Tom Brennan at Vermont. He then went back to his alma mater Rice where he was the head coach of the boys' basketball team. Cieplicki then transitioned to the Vermont women's program as an assistant under Cathy Inglese, and followed her to Boston College as an assistant between the years of 1991 and 1995. He returned to his alma mater once more, this time to coach the Rice girls' basketball team for two seasons before being named the head women's basketball coach at Vermont.

While at Vermont, his teams won three America East Conference regular season titles, and advanced to the NCAA tournament in 2000. In 2000, and 2002, he was named American East Conference Coach of the year. In 2003, he was named the head women's basketball coach at Syracuse and resigned in 2006.

== Personal ==
Cieplicki is a member of the Vermont Sports Hall of Fame, New England Basketball Hall of Fame, Rice Memorial Athletic Hall of Fame and the William & Mary Athletic Hall of Fame. He comes from a prominent basketball family as his father Bernie Sr. won three Vermont state boys basketball championships as a coach, while brother Bernie Jr. played collegiately at both Fairfield and Vermont. His brother Kevin also coached the Rice boys program, while nephew Kyle played collegiately at Vermont and is a current assistant coach with the Catamounts.

He currently lives in Syracuse, New York and works in the non-profit sector.
