= Adam Hess (basketball) =

American-German basketball player (born 1981)

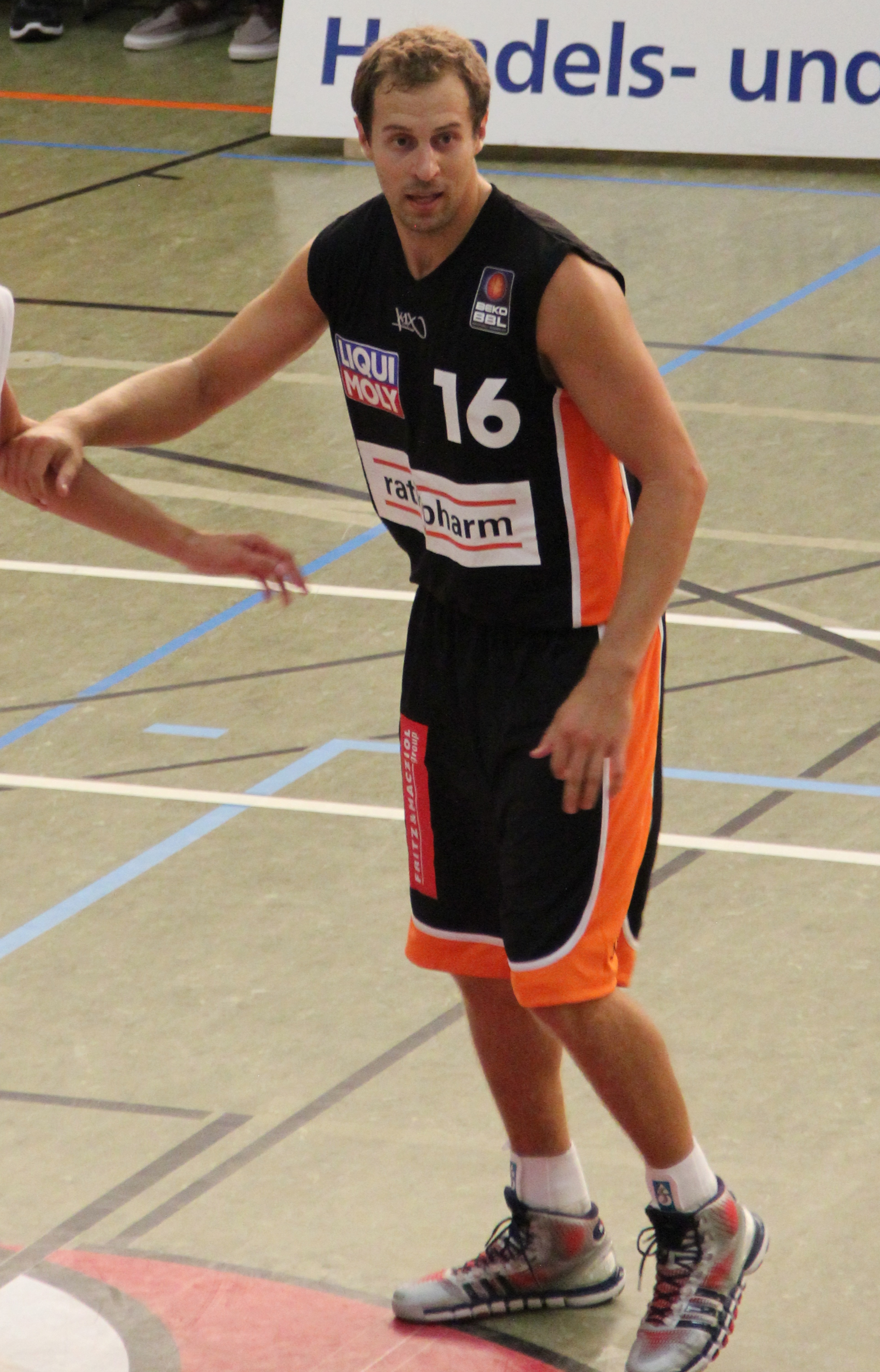

Personal information
- Born: April 4, 1981 (age 45) Warren, Michigan, U.S.
- Listed height: 6 ft 6 in (1.98 m)
- Listed weight: 220 lb (100 kg)

Career information
- High school: Grosse Pointe South (Grosse Pointe Farms, Michigan)
- College: Eastern Michigan (1999–2000); William & Mary (2001–2004)
- NBA draft: 2004: undrafted
- Playing career: 2004–2016
- Position: Small forward
- Number: 16

Career history
- 2004–2006: ČEZ Nymburk
- 2006–2007: Artland Dragons
- 2007–2008: Chorale Roanne
- 2008–2009: Artland Dragons
- 2009–2010: Tarragona
- 2010–2012: Artland Dragons
- 2012–2013: Phoenix Hagen
- 2013–2015: ratiopharm Ulm
- 2015–2016: Phoenix Hagen

Career highlights
- 2× NBLCR champion (2005, 2006); 2× NBLCR All-Star (2005, 2006); 2× First-team All-CAA (2003, 2004); CAA Male Scholar Athlete of the Year (2004); Phoenix Hagen Team of the Century

Adam Hess (born April 4, 1981) is an American-German retired professional basketball player who last played for Phoenix Hagen in Germany's Basketball Bundesliga. He previously played for ratiopharm Ulm. After graduating from William & Mary in 2004, Hess began his career overseas with ČEZ Nymburk in the Czech Republic's National Basketball League. In his two seasons with the team, he was named an All-Star and his team won league championships. Hess has acquired German citizenship and is eligible to play for German national teams if he chooses.
