= David Cohn =

American basketball player (born 1995)

Free Agent
- Position: Point guard

Personal information
- Born: March 28, 1995 (age 31) Chicago, Illinois
- Listed height: 6 ft 2 in (1.88 m)
- Listed weight: 167 lb (76 kg)

Career information
- High school: York Community (Elmhurst, Illinois)
- College: Colorado State (2013–2014); William & Mary (2015–2018)
- NBA draft: 2018: undrafted
- Playing career: 2018–present

Career history
- 2018–2019: Hapoel Eilat
- 2019–2020: Maccabi Haifa
- 2021–2022: Panthers Schwenningen
- 2022–2023: Newcastle Eagles
- 2023–2024: VfL AstroStars Bochum
- 2025: Tigers Tübingen
- 2025: Álftanes
- 2025–2026: PS Karlsruhe Lions

Career highlights
- Third-team All-CAA (2018)

David Allan Cohn (born March 28, 1995) is an American basketball player who last played for PS Karlsruhe Lions of the German ProA. Cohn earlier played in England, Israel and Germany. He plays the point guard position.

== Personal life ==
Cohn was born in Chicago, Illinois, and grew up in Elmhurst, Illinois. His parents are Paula and Dave Cohn. He has a younger sister, Olivia, and a younger brother, Erik. He is 6 ft 2 in (1.88 m) tall and weighs 167 pounds (76 kg).

== High school career ==
He went to York Community High School ('13) in Elmhurst. Cohn averaged 22 points, 5 rebounds, and 5 assists per game as a junior in 2011–12, and set a school single-game scoring record with 47 points during the season. He averaged 17 points, 5 rebounds, and 3 assists per game in his senior year. He was an All-State selection his junior and senior seasons, and as a senior both Chicago Sun-Time's All-Area and Daily Herald DuPage County All-Area. He scored more than 1,600 career points, second in York history.

== College career ==
Cohn attended Colorado State University for his freshman year of college, playing basketball for the Colorado State Rams.

He then transferred and attended the College of William & Mary ('18), and played college basketball for the William & Mary Tribe. In 2015–16 Cohn had the second-best assists per game percentage in the Colonial Athletic Association (4.6), and the third-best free throw shooting percentage (.835). In 2016–17 he had the fifth-best assists per game percentage in the CAA (4.5). In his senior year in 2017–18 he scored 14.2 points and had 6.7 assists per game (best in the CAA; 11th-best in the NCAA). He also had the best free throw percentage in the CAA (.911; fifth-best in the NCAA), was second-best in steals per game (1.6), and sixth-best 2-point field goal percentage in the CAA (.605). He was the only player in the nation, out of the players on 351 Division I teams, who shot at least 50% from the field (52.9%), 40% on 3-point attempts (42.6%), and 90% in free-throw attempts (91.2%). As of November 2020, he was one of only ten NCAA players to have joined the DI men's basketball's 50–40–90 club since 1993. In 2018 he was All-CAA Third Team. He became the all-time assists leader at William & Mary.

== Professional career ==
Cohn played for Hapoel Eilat in 2018–19, and for Maccabi Haifa of the Israeli Basketball Premier League in 2019–20. In September 2021, he was signed by the Panthers Schwenningen of the second-tier of German basketball, ProA. Cohn averaged a league-high 9.1 assists per game for the Schwenningen team in 2021–22, while scoring 12 points a game. He also averaged 3.7 rebounds and 2 steals per contest.

On September 17, 2022, Cohn was signed by the Newcastle Eagles of the British Basketball League (BBL). He appeared in 36 BBL games, averaging 10.5 points, 6.4 assists and 3.1 rebounds per contest. On November 1, 2023, he signed with the VfL AstroStars Bochum of the German ProA. Cohn finished the 2023–24 season for Bochum with per game averages of 13.3 points, 6.6 assists and 2.8 rebounds. On January 16, 2025, he put pen to paper on a deal with German ProA side Tigers Tübingen.

In August 2025, he signed with Álftanes of the Icelandic Úrvalsdeild karla

On September 25, 2025, he signed with PS Karlsruhe Lions of the German ProA.
