= Marcus Thornton (basketball, born 1993) =

American basketball player (born 1993)

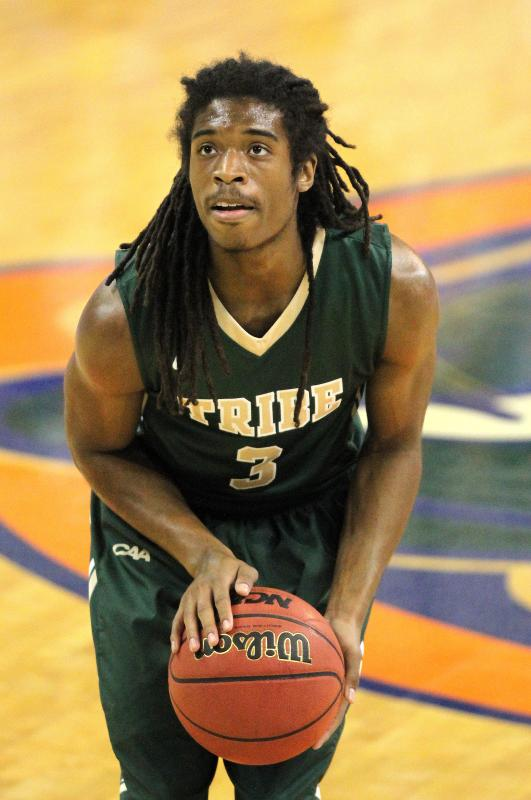
- Thornton with the William & Mary Tribe in 2014

No. 8 – Beirut Club
- Position: Shooting guard / small forward
- League: Lebanese Basketball League

Personal information
- Born: February 9, 1993 (age 33) Upper Marlboro, Maryland, U.S.
- Listed height: 6 ft 4 in (1.93 m)
- Listed weight: 190 lb (86 kg)

Career information
- High school: Bishop McNamara (Forestville, Maryland)
- College: William & Mary (2011–2015)
- NBA draft: 2015: 2nd round, 45th overall pick
- Drafted by: Boston Celtics
- Playing career: 2015–present

Career history
- 2015–2016: Sydney Kings
- 2016: Maine Red Claws
- 2016–2017: Consultinvest Pesaro
- 2017: Guangxi Rhinos
- 2017–2018: Canton Charge
- 2018–2019: Seoul SK Knights
- 2019–2020: Élan Chalon
- 2020–2021: Niners Chemnitz
- 2021–2022: Medi Bayreuth
- 2022–2023: Fortitudo Bologna
- 2023–2024: Lavrio
- 2024: Astros de Jalisco
- 2024–2025: Benfica
- 2025: Lavrio
- 2025–2026: Argeș Pitești
- 2026–present: Beirut Club

Career highlights
- CAA Player of the Year (2015); AP honorable mention All-American (2015); 2× First-team All-CAA (2014, 2015); Second-team All-CAA (2013); CAA All-Rookie Team (2012); No. 3 jersey retired by William & Mary Tribe
- Stats at Basketball Reference

Marcus Alexander Thornton (born February 9, 1993) is an American professional basketball player for Beirut Club of the Lebanese Basketball League (LBL). He completed his collegiate career at the College of William & Mary (W&M) in 2015 and was named the 2014–15 Colonial Athletic Association Player of the Year. Thornton was drafted by the Boston Celtics with the 45th overall pick in the 2015 NBA draft, and spent 10 days on the NBA roster of the Cleveland Cavaliers, but never played in a regular season game in the NBA.

On February 25, 2015, Thornton surpassed 2,052 career points to overtake Chet Giermak's long-standing school record. Giermak's mark stood for 65 years – the longest-lasting NCAA Division I school record in the nation at the time it was broken.

== High school career ==
Thornton, a native of Upper Marlboro, Maryland, fell in love with basketball at an early age and was considered very talented throughout his youth. He attended Bishop McNamara High School, a perennial basketball power, not because of the sport but because of its academic reputation and its proximity to his home. He suited up for the varsity team as a sophomore but did not play, largely because he was playing behind future NCAA Division I players Talib Zanna (Pittsburgh), Rashad Whack (Mount St. Mary's), Lawrence Smith (North Carolina A&T), and Jerome Couplin III, who went on to play football at William & Mary (and eventually, the NFL).

He made the most out of his two-year varsity career at Bishop McNamara. Thornton scored 1,254 points, set the school career scoring average at 19.9 points per game, three-point field goal percentage (.430), and three-pointers made (161). He was named the Gatorade Maryland State Player of the Year as a senior after averaging 23.4 points, 4.8 rebounds, 2.3 assists and 1.7 steals per game, all while competing in the Washington Catholic Athletic Conference, the toughest high school basketball conference in the country. In his final game for Bishop McNamara, he scored a career high and school record 43 points.

== College career ==
Thornton became the first William & Mary Tribe signee to be named a Gatorade state player of the year. He chose William & Mary over other schools partly because of its academic reputation and partly because of the attention then-assistant coach Jamion Christian paid him during recruitment. Although Christian ended up taking an assistant coaching job at VCU the spring before Thornton enrolled, it did not affect his decision to attend.

The 2011–12 season, his freshman year, saw the Tribe go 6–26 and finish third from the bottom of the CAA standings. He averaged 11.1 points, scoring 355 on the year, and was named to the CAA All-Rookie Team. He increased his scoring to 18.8 points per game in 2012–13 while he began to establish himself as a player who could create his own shot late in a possession. Thornton was named Second Team All-CAA, becoming just the second W&M player to earn a second team honor in his sophomore year. After scoring 565 points that season, entered his junior year just 80 points shy of 1,000 for his career.

Thornton junior season of 2013–14 was a historic one for both himself and the team. The Tribe recorded 20 wins (20–12 overall), finished third in the CAA, and advanced to their third CAA tournament championship game in seven seasons. The Tribe lost by one point to Delaware, 75 to 74, barely missing out on the program's first-ever NCAA tournament appearance. Thornton's potential game-winning jump shot rattled off the back of the rim as time expired. He was the tournament's high scorer with 59 points in three games and was named to the All-CAA Tournament Team along with teammate Brandon Britt. His 599 total points for the season rank fifth-most in school history and Thornton became just the second W&M player to be named NABC All-District 10 First Team in back to back seasons. He also became the third W&M player to be named First Team All-CAA. Thornton ended the season with 1,519 career points, the most in school history for a player through his first three seasons.

Entering his senior season, Thornton was selected by the league's coaches as the preseason CAA Player of the Year. Lindy's also chose Thornton as the league's most versatile player and its top NBA prospect. He also entered 2014–15 as the only returning All-CAA First Team player with a legitimate shot at breaking the school's scoring mark of 2,052. During the February 18, 2015 game against Northeastern, Thornton surpassed the 2,000-point mark and ended the game with 2,016. The W&M mark of 2,052, set by All-American Chet Giermak, was broken by Thornton exactly one week later in a game against Towson. The school record had stood since 1950 and was the longest-standing Division I men's basketball school scoring record in the country. Thornton guided the Tribe to a 12–6 CAA record as they finished in a four-way tie for the regular season conference championship with James Madison, Northeastern, and UNC Wilmington. On March 5, Thornton was named as the 2015 CAA Player of the Year, becoming the first W&M player to win it in the 32-year history of the award. He also repeated as an All-CAA First Team selection, becoming just the second W&M player to earn the honor twice (joining Adam Hess in 2003 and 2004).

For the second consecutive season, William & Mary earned a berth in the CAA tournament championship game. However, for the first time in school history, the Tribe entered the tournament as the number one seed. They went on to lose the 2015 tournament's final game to Northeastern, 72 to 61, thus ending their chance at a bid into the NCAA tournament. Thornton, however, was named to the CAA All-Tournament Team as well as being the tournament's leading scorer in both 2014 and 2015. By owning the regular season tie-breakers over the other three co-champions, William & Mary earned the automatic National Invitation Tournament (NIT) bid, making the 2015 appearance their third in school history. On March 17, 2015, in the NIT's first round, Thornton scored a game-high 23 points despite the Tribe's 70–67 loss to Tulsa. Thornton finished his collegiate career having amassed 2,178 points, which is the most in William & Mary history and seventh most in CAA history as of the end of the 2014–15 season. He scored 659 points in his senior season, which stands as the second most for a season in school history behind Giermak's 740. He also set the single season three-point field goals made (102) and most career games played (127 – tied) records.

On March 30, the Associated Press named Thornton an honorable mention All-American. He was the first W&M player since 1981 (Mike Strayhorn) to earn the distinction and only the sixth overall to that point.

=== College statistics ===
Year	Team	GP	GS	MPG	FG%	3P%	FT%	RPG	APG	SPG	BPG	PPG
2011–12	William & Mary	32	14	27.8	.371	.336	.707	2.4	1.3	.3	.2	11.1
2012–13	William & Mary	30	30	36.3	.440	.435	.827	2.8	2.8	.9	.5	18.8
2013–14	William & Mary	32	30	35.6	.435	.403	.779	2.3	2.8	1.1	.2	18.7
2014–15	William & Mary	33	33	36.7	.456	.402	.830	2.8	2.9	.6	.1	20.0
Career		127	107	34.1	.430	.402	.789	2.6	2.4	.7	.2	17.1

== Professional career ==
=== NBA Draft and Summer League ===
On June 25, 2015, Thornton was selected with the 45th overall pick in the 2015 NBA draft by the Boston Celtics, making him the first William & Mary player ever taken in the modern draft format (two rounds; since 1989). He later joined the Celtics for the 2015 NBA Summer League and averaged 5.1 points and 1.1 rebounds in eight games.

=== Sydney Kings (2015–2016) ===
On July 22, 2015, Thornton signed with the Sydney Kings for Australia's 2015–16 National Basketball League season. On October 10, 2015, he made his debut for the Kings against the Cairns Taipans. In 29 minutes of action as a starter, he recorded nine points, three rebounds and three assists in an 87–63 win. On November 1, he scored a season-high 29 points on 11-of-17 shooting in a loss to Melbourne United. He appeared in all 28 games for the last-placed Kings, averaging 12.8 points, 2.5 rebounds and 2.0 assists per game, but shot just 37.7 percent from the field and 28.1 percent on three-pointers.

=== Maine Red Claws (2016) ===
On March 1, 2016, Thornton was acquired by the Maine Red Claws, the Celtics' D-League affiliate. Four days later, he made his debut for Maine in a 122–106 win over Raptors 905, recording seven points, one rebound, three assists and one steal in 15 minutes.

=== Consultinvest Pesaro (2016–2017) ===
On July 30, 2016, Thornton signed a two-year deal with Italian side Consultinvest Pesaro. On June 26, 2017, Boston Celtics was reported to have renounced their rights to Thornton.

=== Guangxi Rhinos (2017) ===
In 2017, Thornton played for the Guangxi Rhinos of the second-tier National Basketball League in China.

=== Canton Charge (2017–2018) ===
On November 3, 2017, Thornton was included in the opening roster of Canton Charge.

On February 21, 2018, the Cleveland Cavaliers signed Thornton to a 10-day contract; he was then assigned back to the G-League. On March 4, he was reported to not have his second 10-day contract offered by the Cavaliers and returned to Canton Charge. Thornton never played a game for the Cavaliers.

=== Élan Chalon (2019–2020) ===
On July 4, 2019, he has signed with Élan Chalon of the LNB Pro A. Thornton averaged 10.4 points per game.

=== Niners Chemnitz (2020–2021) ===
On July 28, 2020, Thornton signed with Niners Chemnitz in Germany.

He averaged a team high 13.9 points and 4.2 assists in 33 games during the 2020–2021 season.

=== Medi Bayreuth (2021–2022) ===
On June 28, 2021, he has signed with Medi Bayreuth of the Basketball Bundesliga. In his two seasons in Germany's top-tier league for Niners Chemnitz and Medi Bayreuth, Thornton averaged a convincing 13.2 points, 3.5 assists, and 1.9 rebounds across 58 games.

=== Fortitudo Bologna (2022–2023) ===
Thornton spent the 2022–23 campaign with the historic Italian club Fortitudo Bologna.

=== Lavrio (2023–2024) ===
On August 14, 2023, Thornton signed with Greek club Lavrio. In 27 games, he averaged 11.4 points, 2.3 rebounds and 2.8 assists per contest.

=== Astros de Jalisco (2024) ===
On May 3, 2024, Thornton signed with the Astros de Jalisco of the Circuito de Baloncesto de la Costa del Pacífico (CIBACOPA) in Mexico.

=== Benfica (2024–2025) ===
Thornton started the 2024–25 campaign with Portuguese club Benfica.

=== Return to Lavrio (2025) ===
On February 18, 2025, Thornton made his return to Lavrio for the rest of the season.

== Personal life ==
Thornton is the son of Wayne and Debra Thornton. His brother, Andre Brooks, played basketball at Bridgeport University in Connecticut. His sister Tasha Brooks-Thornton was a high school state champion in Columbia, Maryland. Thornton's dreadlocks have become a signature look and help define his personal brand. He graduated with a kinesiology degree from William & Mary.
