= Chet Giermak =

American college basketball player

Personal information
- Born: May 25, 1927 Chicago, Illinois, U.S.
- Died: March 16, 2015 (aged 87) Erie, Pennsylvania, U.S.
- Listed height: 6 ft 6 in (1.98 m)

Career information
- High school: Lindblom Tech (Chicago, Illinois)
- College: William & Mary (1946–1950)
- NBA draft: 1950: 4th round, 45th overall pick
- Drafted by: Rochester Royals
- Position: Center
- Number: 32

Career highlights
- Second-team All-American – Collier's (1950); 2× AP Honorable mention All-American (1949, 1950); 2× First-team All-SoCon (1949, 1950); Second-team All-SoCon (1947); SoCon tournament MVP (1949); No. 32 retired by William & Mary Tribe
- Stats at Basketball Reference

Chester Frank Giermak (May 25, 1927 – March 16, 2015) was an All-American basketball player for William & Mary from 1946 to 1950.

== High school ==
Prior to matriculating at the College of William & Mary in Williamsburg, Virginia, Giermak attended Lindblom Technical High School in Chicago, Illinois, where he was a four-year stand-out center on the basketball team. In 1945, Giermak's senior year, he led Lindblom to the semi-finals of the All-Chicago high school basketball tournament and earned Second Team All-City for the center position. In April 1945, Chet enlisted into the Navy, where he spent the next 14 months serving as a corpsman.

== College ==
After arriving on William & Mary's campus in September 1946, one year removed from high school, Chet Giermak was not a heralded basketball prospect. He began his collegiate career as a walk-on player, asking for a uniform from varsity coach Dick Gallagher (whom he later credited with teaching him "the finer points of the game"). He made the junior varsity team but did not stay on it long. During the team's first intra-squad game, Gallagher noticed Chet's ability and immediately promoted him to the Tribe's varsity team.

Over the next four seasons, Giermak was consistently the nation's top scorer or close to it, using his lanky frame and deadly hookshot to amass myriad points. He recorded back-to-back seasons during his junior and senior years where he averaged 20+ points (21.8 and 20.8, respectively). On January 13, 1949, Chet scored 45 points against the University of Baltimore, establishing a new Blow Gymnasium record. This total set the all-time Virginia state collegiate mark, plus the national, conference, and state individual single game marks for the 1948–49 college basketball season. All of those records have since been broken. Seton Hall University's coach and basketball legend John "Honey" Russell once praised Chet's abilities by noting, "[t]his Giermak is better than Tony Lavelli."

Chester Giermak's 111-game career and its achievements earned him a spot in the William & Mary Hall of Fame. He is ranked among the all-time statistical leaders in many categories, and some of Giermak's more notable accomplishments include:

- 4 years All-State
- 3 seasons All-Southern Conference
- 2 years as team captain
- Numerous All-America honors (1950)
- 2,052 career points (second all-time at W&M)
  - Giermak's career mark was set in 1950. It stood for 65 years – the longest-lasting NCAA Division I school record in the nation at the time it was broken by Marcus Thornton on February 25, 2015.
- 740 single season points in 1948–49 (school record)
- His jersey number (#32) was retired years later

In the 1950 NBA draft, the Rochester Royals selected Giermak as their ninth pick in the 4th round (45th overall) Though he was drafted, Chet never made the team's final cut and thus never played in an actual NBA game.

Giermak died on March 16, 2015, in Erie, Pennsylvania, due to complications from a stroke.
