= Jeff Cohen (basketball) =

American basketball player (1939–1978)

Personal information
- Born: October 12, 1939 Kenosha, Wisconsin, U.S.
- Died: June 22, 1978 (aged 38) Zurich, Switzerland
- Listed height: 6 ft 7 in (2.01 m)
- Listed weight: 225 lb (102 kg)

Career information
- High school: Bradford (Kenosha, Wisconsin)
- College: William & Mary (1958–1961)
- NBA draft: 1961: 2nd round, 23rd overall pick
- Drafted by: Chicago Packers
- Playing career: 1961–1963
- Position: Power forward

Career history
- 1961–1962: Hawaii Chiefs
- 1962–1963: Chicago Majors

Career highlights
- SoCon Player of the Year (1961); 2× First-team All-SoCon (1960, 1961); Second-team All-SoCon (1959); No. 52 retired by William & Mary Tribe
- Stats at Basketball Reference

Jeffrey Maxwell Cohen (October 12, 1939 – June 22, 1978) was an All-American basketball player at the College of William & Mary in 1960–61. He was selected as the 14th pick in the second round (23rd overall) of the 1961 NBA draft by the Chicago Packers (now the Washington Wizards).

At William & Mary, Cohen played his way into the NCAA record books. He is the ninth all-time leading rebounder in the pre-1973 college basketball era, having grabbed 1,679 boards. He is one of very few men's basketball players in NCAA history to score 2,000 points and grab 1,000 rebounds during a collegiate career. At the time of his graduation, he was only one of 10 players to ever accomplish that feat. As of 2019–20, Cohen's 2,003 career points rank fourth all-time at William & Mary. He was a three-time All-Southern Conference selection from 1959 to 1961, and in 1990 he had his jersey number retired posthumously. Additionally, Jeff set a W&M single game scoring record of 49 points on February 25, 1961. He was a member of the Sigma Nu fraternity.

Despite being drafted to the NBA, Jeff was never signed by any team. He spent some time playing professionally in the now-defunct American Basketball League from 1961 to 1963. As a member of the Hawaii Chiefs, he averaged 10.8 points, 6.6 rebounds and 0.6 assists per game for the 1961–62 season. The following season, Cohen averaged 12.5 points, 8.0 rebounds and 1.2 assists while playing for the Chicago Majors.

Cohen moved to Switzerland in 1972 and worked at a pharmaceutical firm. He was married and had a daughter. On June 22, 1978, Cohen died of cancer in Zurich, aged 38.

== See also ==
- List of NCAA Division I men's basketball players with 2,000 points and 1,000 rebounds
- List of NCAA Division I men's basketball career rebounding leaders
- List of select Jewish basketball players
