= William & Mary Tribe men's basketball =

Basketball team

2026–27 William & Mary Tribe men's basketball team
- University: College of William & Mary
- Head coach: Brian Earl (3rd season)
- Location: Williamsburg, Virginia
- Arena: Kaplan Arena (capacity: 11,300)
- Conference: Coastal Athletic Association
- Nickname: Tribe
- Colors

Conference regular-season champions
- 1983, 1998, 2015

Uniforms
Home	Away

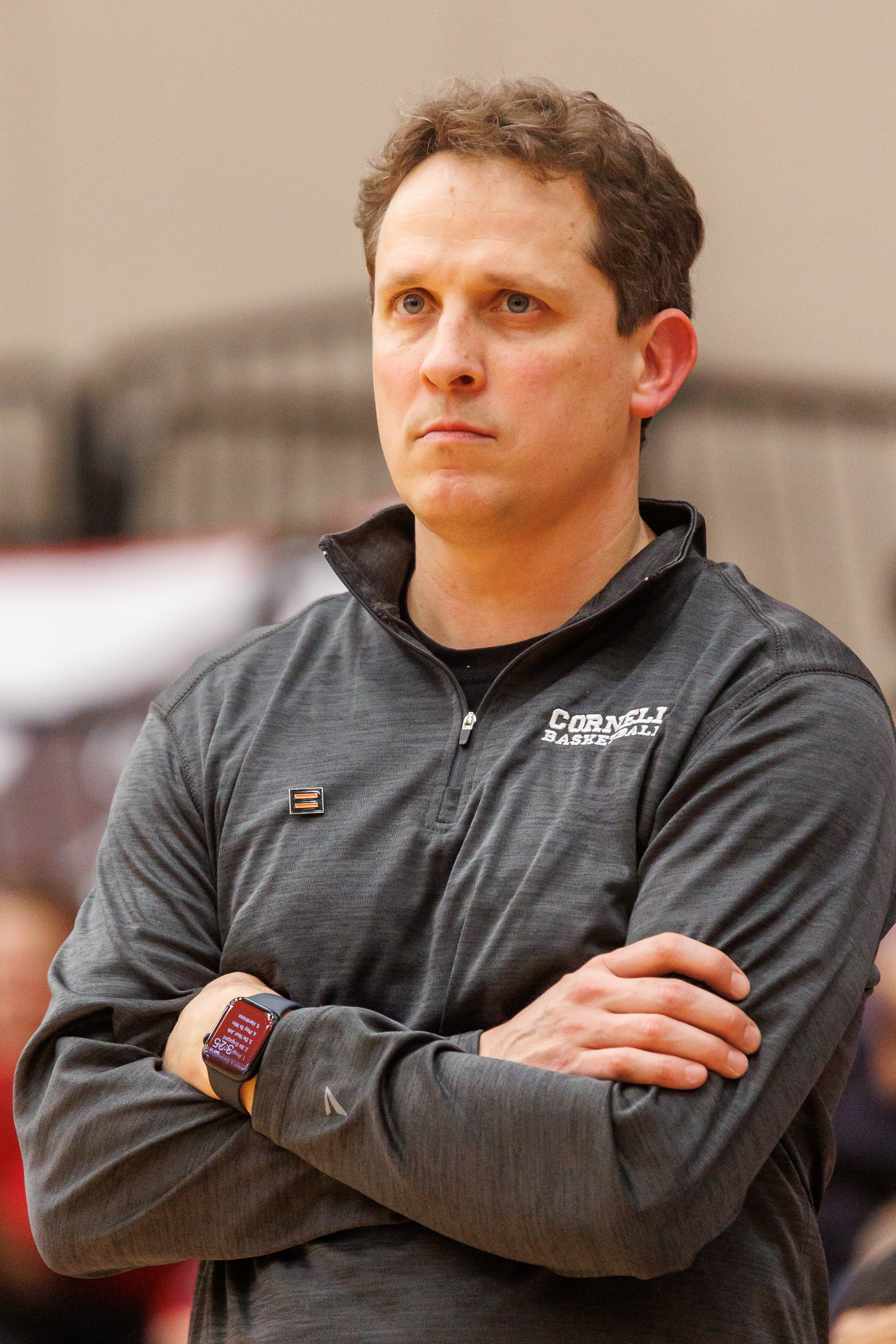
Head Coach Brian Earl

The William & Mary Tribe men's basketball team represents the College of William & Mary in Williamsburg, Virginia in NCAA Division I competition. The school's team competes in the Coastal Athletic Association (CAA) and play their home games in Kaplan Arena. Former Cornell Head Coach Brian Earl was hired as the 32nd coach in school history following the dismissal of Coach Dane Fischer. Tony Shaver served as the head coach from 2003–2019 and leads the school in all-time wins for a coach.

== Postseason berths ==
=== NIT results ===
The Tribe have appeared in the National Invitation Tournament three times. Their combined record is 0–3.

Year	Round	Opponent	Result
1983	First Round	Virginia Tech	L 79–85
2010	First Round	North Carolina	L 72–80
2015	First Round	Tulsa	L 67–70

=== NCAA tournament results ===
- None (have never qualified)

The Tribe (an original Division I team since the NCAA division classification began for the 1956–57 season and retroactively recognized as a de facto Division I team since the Associated Press started classifying teams as either major programs or small colleges in 1948) are one of 42 Division I programs to have never appeared in the NCAA Division I men's basketball tournament. Of all Division I schools today that were charter members of this new classification, only William & Mary, The Citadel, and Army have never reached the NCAA men's basketball tournament at least once. (St. Francis Brooklyn was also part of this group before it discontinued all athletics in 2023.) The closest effort by the Tribe to reach the NCAA tournament was a 75–74 loss in the 2014 CAA Tournament Final to Delaware. The Tribe also lost conference tournament championships in 1958, 1961, 1965, 1975, 1983, 2008, 2010, and 2015, now having gone 0–9 in NCAA tournament berth-clinching games.

== Rivalries ==
William & Mary's traditional rivals have included in-state opponents Old Dominion University, James Madison University, the University of Richmond, Virginia Commonwealth University, and George Mason University. However, of these teams, none are still members of the CAA. The Richmond Spiders, VCU Rams, and George Mason Patriots have all moved on to the Atlantic 10 Conference while the Old Dominion Monarchs left for Conference USA in 2013 and the James Madison Dukes left for the Sun Belt Conference in 2022. Some of these teams are maintained as part of William & Mary's out of conference schedule each year along with other Virginia schools like Virginia, Virginia Tech, Hampton, Radford, VMI, and Liberty.

=== Series records ===
- Records through the 2019–20 season

Opponent	Match Ups	Record (Pct.)	Last Game
Richmond	200	97–103 (.487)	December 3, 2014
VMI	118	77–41 (.653)	November 27, 2013
Virginia Tech	117	41–76 (.350)	December 17, 2005
James Madison	98	49–49 (.500)	February 22, 2020
Old Dominion	91	23–68 (.253)	December 3, 2019
Virginia	81	29–52 (.358)	December 22, 2018
George Mason	68	28–40 (.412)	December 1, 2018
VCU	51	12–39 (.235)	February 1, 2012

== NCAA records ==
Individual

- Bill Chambers – single game rebound total (51); occurred on February 14, 1953 vs. Virginia (rules changes since then make this record unlikely to be broken)

== Accolades ==
=== Southern Conference (1936–1977) ===
Season	Player of the Year	Defensive Player of the Year	Coach of the Year	First Team All-SoCon	Second Team All-SoCon	Third Team All-SoCon	Rookie of the Year
1936–37	N/A	—					
1937–38	N/A	—					
1938–39	N/A	—					
1939–40	N/A	—					
1940–41	N/A	—					
1941–42	N/A	—					
1942–43	N/A	—					
1943–44	N/A	—					
1944–45	N/A	—					
1945–46	N/A	—					
1946–47	N/A				Chet Giermak		
1947–48	N/A	—					
1948–49	N/A			Chet Giermak			
1949–50	N/A			Chet Giermak (2)			
1950–51	N/A				Perry Lewis; Ed McMillan		
1951–52					Bill Chambers		
1952–53					Bill Chambers (2)		
1953–54	—						
1954–55	—						
1955–56	—						
1956–57	—						
1957–58				Roy Lange			
1958–59				Roy Lange (2)	Jeff Cohen		
1959–60				Jeff Cohen	Ben Vaughan		
1960–61	Jeff Cohen			Jeff Cohen (2)			
1961–62	—						
1962–63					Roger Bergey		
1963–64					Dave Hunter		
1964–65	—						
1965–66				Ben Pomeroy			
1966–67				Ben Pomeroy (2)	Ron Panneton		
1967–68				Bob Sherwood			
1968–69	—						
1969–70					Bob Sherwood		
1970–71	Tom Jasper			Tom Jasper	Steve Dodge		
1971–72					Jeffrey Trammell		
1972–73					Mike Arizin		
1973–74					Mike Arizin (2)		
1974–75				Ron Satterthwaite			
1975–76				John Lowenhaupt	Ron Satterthwaite		
1976–77					John Lowenhaupt		

=== ECAC South (1977–1982) ===
William & Mary joined the CAA, its current conference, in 1982–83. The CAA's predecessor was the ECAC South, which existed between 1977–78 and 1984–85. The CAA recognizes the 1982–83 through 1984–85 seasons as part of its basketball history but not any earlier. The CAA was formally founded in 1982–83 as the ECAC South Basketball League. It was renamed the Colonial Athletic Association in 1985–86 when it added championships in other sports, and the Coastal Athletic Association in 2023 (although a number of members maintain ECAC affiliation in some sports).

Season	Player of the Year	Defensive Player of the Year	Coach of the Year	First Team All-ECAC	Second Team All-ECAC	Third Team All-ECAC	Rookie of the Year
1977–78	—						
1978–79	—						
1979–80	—						
1980–81				Mike Strayhorn			
1981–82	—						

=== Colonial/Coastal Athletic Association (1982–present) ===
Season	Player of the Year	Defensive Player of the Year	Coach of the Year	First Team All-CAA	Second Team All-CAA	Third Team All-CAA	Rookie of the Year
1982–83			Bruce Parkhill	Keith Cieplicki, Brant Weidner			
1983–84				Keith Cieplicki (2)			
1984–85				Keith Cieplicki (3)			
1985–86	—						
1986–87	—						
1987–88					Tim Trout		
1988–89					Tom Bock		
1989–90							Thomas Roberts
1990–91					Thomas Roberts		
1991–92					Thomas Roberts (2)		
1992–93					Thomas Roberts (3)		
1993–94	—						
1994–95					Kurt Small		
1995–96					David Cully		
1996–97					Bobby Fitzgibbons		
1997–98			Charlie Woollum	Randy Bracy	Terence Jennings		
1998–99	—						
1999–00					Jim Moran		
2000–01					Jim Moran (2)		
2001–02					Mike Johnson		
2002–03				Adam Hess			
2003–04				Adam Hess (2)		Corey Cofield	Corey Cofield
2004–05						Corey Cofield (2)	
2005–06	—						
2006–07						Adam Payton	
2007–08			Tony Shaver			Laimis Kisielius	
2008–09						David Schneider	
2009–10			Tony Shaver (2)		David Schneider	Quinn McDowell	
2010–11						Quinn McDowell (2)	
2011–12	—						
2012–13					Marcus Thornton	Tim Rusthoven	
2013–14				Marcus Thornton	Tim Rusthoven		Omar Prewitt
2014–15	Marcus Thornton	Terry Tarpey		Marcus Thornton (2)	Terry Tarpey	Omar Prewitt	
2015–16		Terry Tarpey (2)		Omar Prewitt	Terry Tarpey (2)		
2016–17				Daniel Dixon	Omar Prewitt (2)		
2017–18					Nathan Knight	David Cohn, Justin Pierce	
2018–19				Nathan Knight (2)		Justin Pierce (2)	
2019–20	Nathan Knight	Nathan Knight	Dane Fischer	Nathan Knight (3)		Andy Van Vliet	
2020–21					Luke Loewe		Connor Kochera
2021–22	—						
2022–23	—						
2023–24	—						
2024–25					Gabe Dorsey		
2025–26	—						

== Retired jerseys ==
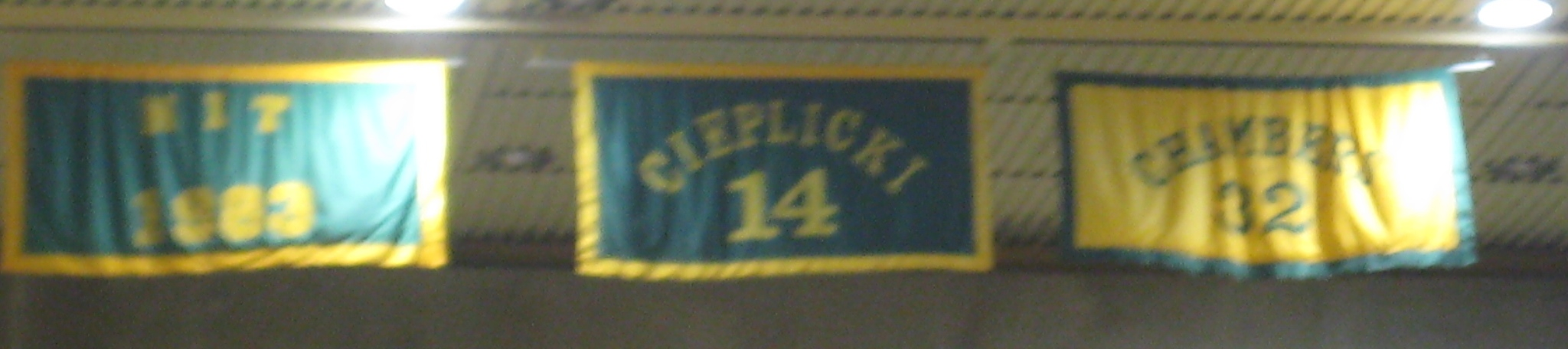
Banners honoring the 1983 NIT berth, Keith Cieplicki, Bill Chambers

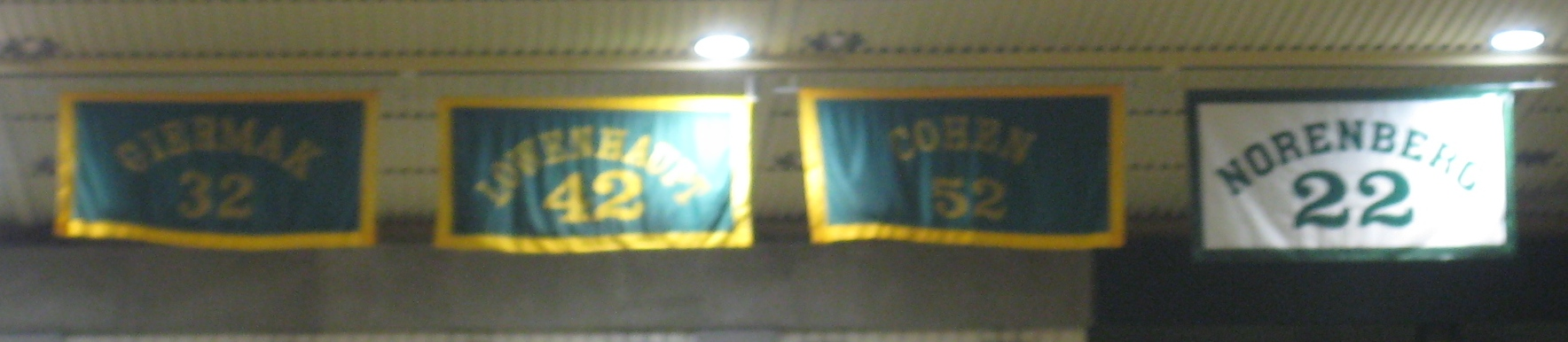
Banners honoring Chet Giermak, John Lowenhaupt, Jeff Cohen and Lynn Norenberg

William & Mary has retired six men's basketball jerseys in its program's history. Uniform numbers are not retired, only ceremonial jerseys. Banners depicting the all-time greats hang in the rafters of Kaplan Arena (the banner in white is for Lynn Norenberg, the only W&M women's basketball player to have a jersey retired). There also hang banners which commemorate their 1983 National Invitation Tournament and 2010 National Invitation Tournament bids.

== Players in the NBA ==
This section is for William & Mary players who have appeared in at least one regular season or postseason NBA game.

- Andy Duncan – Rochester Royals, Boston Celtics (1947–1951)
- Nathan Knight – Atlanta Hawks (2020–2021), Minnesota Timberwolves (2021–2023)
- Brant Weidner – San Antonio Spurs (1983–1984)

== Players in international leagues ==
- Matteus Case - Bristol Flyers
- David Cohn – PS Karlsruhe Lions
- Caleb Dorsey - KK Kansai Helios Domžale
- Gabe Dorsey - BK Patrioti Levice
- Jo'el Emanuel Cheshire Phoenix
- Sean Houpt - Pully Lausanne Foxes
- Nathan Knight – Bnei Herzliya Basket
- Kyle Pulliam - BC Slovan Bratislava
- Anders Nelson — BK Ogre
- Terry Tarpey — Paris Basketball
- Marcus Thornton – FC Argeș Pitești
- Andy Van Vliet – Rostock Seawolves
