= Clemson Tigers men's basketball, 1930–1939 =

American collegiate basketball team seasons

The Clemson Tigers men's basketball teams of 1930–1939 represented Clemson Agricultural College in NCAA college basketball competition.

== 1929–30 ==
1929–30 Clemson Tigers men's basketball
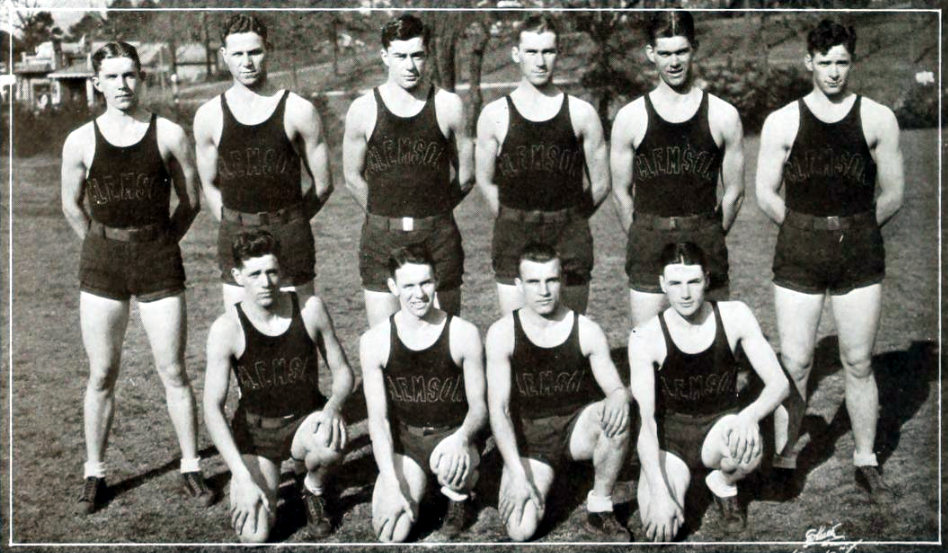
- Conference: Southern Conference
- Record: 16–9 (8–6 SoCon)
- Head coach: Josh Cody
- Home arena: Clemson Field House

Date	Opponent	Site	Result
December 11*	at Erskine	Due West, South Carolina	W 46–24
December 18*	at Presbyterian	Clinton, South Carolina	W 42–27
January 3	at Kentucky	Alumni Gymnasium • Lexington, Kentucky	L 15–31
January 4	at Tennessee	Knoxville, Tennessee	L 26–35
January 7*	Furman	Clemson Field House • Calhoun, South Carolina	L 28–34
January 10	at Alabama Polytechnic	Auburn, Alabama	W 39–31
January 11	at Georgia Tech	Temporary Gym • Atlanta	W 25–24
January 13	at Sewanee	Sewanee, Tennessee	L 24–26
January 14	at Vanderbilt	Nashville, Tennessee	W 48–42 (2OT)
January 17*	Presbyterian	Clemson Field House • Calhoun, South Carolina	W 37–12
January 18*	Newberry	Clemson Field House • Calhoun, South Carolina	W 59–9
January 25*	Wofford	Clemson Field House • Calhoun, South Carolina	W 51–21
January 28*	at Furman	Greenville, South Carolina	L 28–30
January 31	Vanderbilt	Clemson Field House • Calhoun, South Carolina	W 32–37
February 1*	at Wofford	Spartanburg, South Carolina	W 39–16
February 3	Kentucky	Clemson Field House • Calhoun, South Carolina	L 20–34
February 5	Georgia	Clemson Field House • Calhoun, South Carolina	L 24–39
February 12	Florida	Clemson Field House • Calhoun, South Carolina	W 33–28
February 13	Florida	Clemson Field House • Calhoun, South Carolina	W 47–20
February 15	Georgia Tech	Clemson Field House • Calhoun, South Carolina	W 40–26
February 17*	The Citadel	Clemson Field House • Calhoun, South Carolina	W 38–35 (OT)
February 18	at Georgia	Woodruff Hall • Athens, Georgia	L 32–36
February 21	South Carolina	Clemson Field House • Calhoun, South Carolina	W 47–24
N/A*	Wofford	Clemson Field House • Calhoun, South Carolina	W 44–13
February 28*	vs. Alabama	Municipal Auditorium • Atlanta (Southern Conference tournament)	L 22–33
*Non-Conference Game.

== 1930–31 ==
1930–31 Clemson Tigers men's basketball
- Conference: Southern Conference
- Record: 6–7 (3–5 SoCon)
- Head coach: Josh Cody
- Home arena: Clemson Field House

1930–31 Southern Conference men's basketball standings
	Conf.				Overall
Team	W		L	PCT	W		L	PCT
Georgia	15	–	1	.938	23	–	2	.920
Maryland †	8	–	1	.889	18	–	4	.818
Alabama	11	–	2	.846	14	–	6	.700
Kentucky	8	–	2	.800	15	–	3	.833
Auburn	7	–	4	.636	8	–	6	.571
Washington and Lee	4	–	3	.571	11	–	7	.611
Duke	5	–	4	.556	14	–	7	.667
Georgia Tech	8	–	7	.533	11	–	13	.458
Vanderbilt	7	–	7	.500	16	–	8	.667
North Carolina	6	–	6	.500	15	–	9	.625
NC State	5	–	5	.500	8	–	8	.500
LSU	4	–	4	.500	7	–	8	.467
Virginia	5	–	6	.455	11	–	9	.550
Florida	5	–	7	.417	10	–	9	.526
Clemson	3	–	5	.375	6	–	7	.462
Sewanee	3	–	5	.375	5	–	9	.357
Tennessee	4	–	8	.333	11	–	10	.524
Ole Miss	2	–	4	.333	6	–	9	.400
Virginia Tech	3	–	7	.300	5	–	10	.333
VMI	2	–	8	.200	4	–	12	.250
Tulane	2	–	10	.167	6	–	14	.300
South Carolina	1	–	12	.077	1	–	17	.056
† Southern Conference Tournament winner

Some games were cancelled due to a meningitis quarantine on campus.

Date	Opponent	Site	Result
December 16*	at Presbyterian	Clinton, South Carolina	W 36–32
December 17*	at Newberry	Newberry, South Carolina	W 40–9
January 3	at Kentucky	Alumni Gymnasium • Lexington, Kentucky	L 21–31
January 5	at Tennessee	Knoxville, Tennessee	L 32–38
January 10	at Alabama Polytechnic	Auburn, Alabama	L 20–44
January 12*	at Presbyterian	Clinton, South Carolina	W 42–24
January 17	Tennessee	Clemson Field House • Calhoun, South Carolina	W 38–31
January 20	at Georgia	Woodruff Hall • Athens, Georgia	L 25–34
January 26	Alabama Polytechnic	Clemson Field House • Calhoun, South Carolina	W 37–33
February 3	Georgia	Clemson Field House • Calhoun, South Carolina	L 21–31
February 12*	at Furman	Greenville, South Carolina	L 22–24
February 14	Kentucky	Clemson Field House • Calhoun, South Carolina	W 29–26
February 27*	vs. Duke	Municipal Auditorium • Atlanta (Southern Conference tournament)	L 27–31
*Non-Conference Game.

== 1931–32 ==
1931–32 Clemson Tigers men's basketball
- Conference: Southern Conference
- Record: 7–13 (2–9 SoCon)
- Head coach: Joe Davis
- Home arena: Clemson Field House

1931–32 Southern Conference men's basketball standings
	Conf.				Overall
Team	W		L	PCT	W		L	PCT
Kentucky	9	–	1	.900	15	–	2	.882
Maryland	9	–	1	.900	16	–	4	.800
Auburn	9	–	2	.818	12	–	3	.800
Alabama	11	–	3	.786	16	–	4	.800
North Carolina	6	–	3	.667	16	–	5	.762
Virginia	6	–	3	.667	13	–	8	.619
Georgia †	7	–	4	.636	19	–	7	.731
Ole Miss	8	–	5	.615	9	–	6	.600
Georgia Tech	5	–	3	.625	7	–	6	.538
NC State	6	–	4	.600	10	–	6	.625
Duke	6	–	5	.545	14	–	11	.560
LSU	8	–	8	.500	11	–	9	.550
Tennessee	5	–	5	.500	8	–	7	.533
South Carolina	2	–	2	.500	9	–	7	.563
Vanderbilt	5	–	7	.417	8	–	11	.421
Mississippi A&M	4	–	7	.364	5	–	10	.333
Tulane	5	–	9	.357	6	–	10	.375
Florida	4	–	10	.286	8	–	12	.400
Washington and Lee	3	–	8	.273	9	–	10	.474
Virginia Tech	2	–	8	.200	8	–	9	.471
Clemson	2	–	9	.182	8	–	12	.400
Sewanee	1	–	7	.125	3	–	9	.250
VMI	0	–	9	.000	0	–	14	.000
† Southern Conference Tournament winner

Date	Opponent	Site	Result
December 18*	Royal Athletic Club	Clemson Field House • Calhoun, South Carolina	W 27–25
January 2	at Kentucky	Alumni Gymnasium • Lexington, Kentucky	L 25–43
January 4	at Tennessee	Knoxville, Tennessee	L 18–23
January 7	at South Carolina	Carolina Fieldhouse • Columbia, South Carolina	W 24–22 (OT)
January 8	at South Carolina	Carolina Fieldhouse • Columbia, South Carolina	L 23–31
January 13*	Presbyterian	Clemson Field House • Calhoun, South Carolina	W 27–19
January 14	Kentucky	Clemson Field House • Calhoun, South Carolina	L 17–30
January 28*	at Wofford	Andrews Field House • Spartanburg, South Carolina	L 27–28
January 30*	Furman	Clemson Field House • Calhoun, South Carolina	L 18–24
February 2	Georgia	Clemson Field House • Calhoun, South Carolina	L 26–41
February 3*	Jewish Athletic Club	Clemson Field House • Calhoun, South Carolina	L 40–42
February 5	at Florida	Building R • Gainesville, Florida	L 25–36
February 6	at Florida	Building R • Gainesville, Florida	L 33–36
February 9	at Georgia	Woodruff Hall • Athens, Georgia	L 16–40
February 12	South Carolina	Clemson Field House • Calhoun, South Carolina	W 31–22
February 13	South Carolina	Clemson Field House • Calhoun, South Carolina	L 22–24
February 15*	The Citadel	Clemson Field House • Calhoun, South Carolina	W 19–12
February 16*	at Presbyterian	Clinton, South Carolina	W 43–23
February 19*	at Furman	Greenville, South Carolina	L 19–23
February 23*	Wofford	Clemson Field House • Calhoun, South Carolina	W 28–23
*Non-Conference Game.

== 1932–33 ==
1932–33 Clemson Tigers men's basketball
- Conference: Southern Conference
- Record: 10–9 (0–2 SoCon)
- Head coach: Joe Davis
- Home arena: Clemson Field House

1932–33 Southern Conference men's basketball standings
	Conf.				Overall
Team	W		L	PCT	W		L	PCT
South Carolina †	4	–	0	1.000	17	–	2	.895
Duke	7	–	3	.700	17	–	5	.773
Maryland	7	–	3	.700	11	–	9	.550
NC State	6	–	3	.667	11	–	8	.579
North Carolina	5	–	3	.625	12	–	5	.706
Virginia	5	–	3	.625	12	–	6	.667
Virginia Tech	3	–	7	.300	5	–	10	.333
VMI	2	–	8	.200	5	–	10	.333
Washington and Lee	1	–	8	.111	6	–	10	.375
Clemson	0	–	2	.000	10	–	9	.526
† Southern Conference Tournament winner

Date	Opponent	Site	Result
December 15*	Royal Athletic Club	Clemson Field House • Calhoun, South Carolina	W 39–21
January 2*	Tennessee Tech	Clemson Field House • Calhoun, South Carolina	W 44–34
January 3*	at Vanderbilt	Nashville, Tennessee	L 22–39
January 4*	at Sewanee	Sewanee, Tennessee	W 32–18
January 7*	Georgia Tech	Clemson Field House • Calhoun, South Carolina	L 28–29
January 13*	Florida	Clemson Field House • Calhoun, South Carolina	L 28–38
January 14*	Florida	Clemson Field House • Calhoun, South Carolina	L 33–37
January 16*	at Kentucky	Alumni Gymnasium • Lexington, Kentucky	L 18–67
January 20	at South Carolina	Carolina Fieldhouse • Columbia, South Carolina	L 26–47
February 1*	Kentucky	Clemson Field House • Calhoun, South Carolina	L 32–42
February 3*	Furman	Clemson Field House • Calhoun, South Carolina	W 31–16
February 4*	at Presbyterian	Clinton, South Carolina	W 38–25
February 10*	at Furman	Greenville, South Carolina	L 26–27
February 14*	at Georgia	Woodruff Hall • Athens, Georgia	W 35–25
February 16*	Georgia	Clemson Field House • Calhoun, South Carolina	W 36–29
February 17*	at Wofford	Andrews Field House • Spartanburg, South Carolina	W 30–28
February 18*	at Presbyterian	Clinton, South Carolina	W 55–6
February 20*	Wofford	Clemson Field House • Calhoun, South Carolina	W 26–23
February 21	South Carolina	Clemson Field House • Calhoun, South Carolina	L 20–28
*Non-Conference Game.

== 1933–34 ==
1933–34 Clemson Tigers men's basketball
- Conference: Southern Conference
- Record: 7–12 (0–6 SoCon)
- Head coach: Joe Davis
- Home arena: Clemson Field House

1933–34 Southern Conference men's basketball standings
	Conf.				Overall
Team	W		L	PCT	W		L	PCT
South Carolina	6	–	0	1.000	18	–	1	.947
North Carolina	12	–	2	.857	18	–	4	.818
Maryland	6	–	1	.857	11	–	8	.579
Duke	9	–	4	.692	18	–	6	.750
North Carolina State	6	–	5	.545	11	–	6	.647
Washington and Lee †	4	–	5	.444	10	–	6	.625
VMI	3	–	6	.333	4	–	9	.308
Virginia	1	–	9	.100	7	–	11	.389
Virginia Tech	1	–	10	.091	1	–	15	.063
Clemson	0	–	6	.000	7	–	12	.368
† Southern Conference Tournament winner

Date	Opponent	Site	Result
January 3	at North Carolina	Indoor Athletic Center • Chapel Hill, North Carolina	L 26–38
January 4	at Duke	Card Gymnasium • Durham, North Carolina	L 23–36
January 5	at NC State	Thompson Gym • Raleigh, North Carolina	L 27–36
January 9*	at Tennessee	Knoxville, Tennessee	L 27–30
January 10*	at Vanderbilt	Nashville, Tennessee	L 25–27
January 11*	at Tennessee Tech	Cookeville, Tennessee	W 31–20
January 16*	Wofford	Clemson Field House • Calhoun, South Carolina	L 25–34
January 19	South Carolina	Clemson Field House • Calhoun, South Carolina	L 15–41
January 30*	Furman	Clemson Field House • Calhoun, South Carolina	W 28–23
January 31*	Presbyterian	Clemson Field House • Calhoun, South Carolina	W 43–21
February 2*	at Wofford	Andrews Field House • Spartanburg, South Carolina	W 32–29
February 6*	at Georgia	Woodruff Hall • Athens, Georgia	L 23–29
February 7*	at Georgia Tech	Municipal Auditorium • Atlanta	L 25–31
February 9*	Florida	Clemson Field House • Calhoun, South Carolina	L 31–36
February 10*	Florida	Clemson Field House • Calhoun, South Carolina	W 31–26
February 13*	at Furman	Greenville, South Carolina	W 29–15
February 16	at South Carolina	Carolina Fieldhouse • Columbia, South Carolina	L 17–42
February 17	at South Carolina	Carolina Fieldhouse • Columbia, South Carolina	L 18–41
February 20*	Georgia	Clemson Field House • Calhoun, South Carolina	W 29–23
*Non-Conference Game.

== 1934–35 ==
1934–35 Clemson Tigers men's basketball
- Conference: Southern Conference
- Record: 15–3 (3–1 SoCon)
- Head coach: Joe Davis
- Home arena: Clemson Field House

1934–35 Southern Conference men's basketball standings
	Conf.				Overall
Team	W		L	PCT	W		L	PCT
North Carolina †	12	–	1	.923	23	–	2	.920
Clemson	3	–	1	.750	15	–	3	.833
Duke	10	–	4	.714	18	–	8	.692
Virginia	7	–	5	.583	13	–	9	.591
Maryland	4	–	3	.571	8	–	10	.444
North Carolina State	6	–	5	.545	10	–	9	.526
South Carolina	5	–	7	.417	15	–	9	.625
Washington and Lee	4	–	8	.333	10	–	10	.500
VMI	2	–	9	.182	3	–	14	.176
Virginia Tech	1	–	11	.083	3	–	16	.158
† Southern Conference Tournament winner

Date	Opponent	Site	Result
January 3*	at Vanderbilt	Nashville, Tennessee	W 32–22
January 4*	at Tennessee Tech	Cookeville, Tennessee	W 28–19
January 5*	at Sewanee	Sewanee, Tennessee	W 40–16
January 7*	at Tennessee	Knoxville, Tennessee	W 40–33
January 12*	Georgia Tech	Clemson Field House • Calhoun, South Carolina	W 43–29
January 15*	at Wofford	Andrews Field House • Spartanburg, South Carolina	W 51–40
January 18	NC State	Clemson Field House • Calhoun, South Carolina	W 44–21
January 26*	at Georgia	Woodruff Hall • Athens, Georgia	W 31–20
February 2*	Furman	Clemson Field House • Calhoun, South Carolina	W 20–17
February 5	at South Carolina	Carolina Fieldhouse • Columbia, South Carolina	L 30–38
February 7*	at Furman	Greenville, South Carolina	W 43–26
February 9*	Georgia	Clemson Field House • Calhoun, South Carolina	L 43–44 (OT)
February 12*	Wofford	Clemson Field House • Calhoun, South Carolina	W 32–18
February 14	South Carolina	Clemson Field House • Calhoun, South Carolina	W 22–16
February 16*	Mercer	Clemson Field House • Calhoun, South Carolina	W 50–20
February 20*	Presbyterian	Clemson Field House • Calhoun, South Carolina	W 39–23
February 22	Washington and Lee	Clemson Field House • Calhoun, South Carolina	W 48–33
February 28*	vs. Washington and Lee	Thompson Gym • Raleigh, North Carolina (Southern Conference tournament)	L 25–29
*Non-Conference Game.

== 1935–36 ==
1935–36 Clemson Tigers men's basketball
- Conference: Southern Conference
- Record: 15–7 (5–5 SoCon)
- Head coach: Joe Davis
- Home arena: Clemson Field House

1935–36 Southern Conference men's basketball standings
	Conf.				Overall
Team	W		L	PCT	W		L	PCT
Washington and Lee	10	–	1	.909	19	–	2	.905
North Carolina †	13	–	3	.813	21	–	4	.840
North Carolina State	10	–	3	.769	15	–	4	.789
Maryland	4	–	3	.571	14	–	6	.700
Clemson	5	–	5	.500	15	–	7	.682
Duke	4	–	5	.444	20	–	6	.769
Virginia	4	–	8	.333	11	–	13	.458
South Carolina	1	–	6	.143	11	–	8	.579
Virginia Tech	1	–	9	.100	5	–	16	.238
VMI	0	–	10	.000	3	–	14	.176
† Southern Conference Tournament winner

Date	Opponent	Site	Result
December 19*	at Alabama Polytechnic	Auburn, Alabama	W 33–23
December 20*	at Alabama Polytechnic	Auburn, Alabama	W 31–18
January 3	at North Carolina	Indoor Athletic Center • Chapel Hill, North Carolina	L 23–24
January 4	at Virginia	Charlottesville, Virginia	W 45–34
January 6	at NC State	Thompson Gym • Raleigh, North Carolina	L 33–47
January 11*	at Georgia Tech	Naval Armory • Atlanta	W 35–32
January 14*	Wofford	Clemson Field House • Calhoun, South Carolina	W 37–13
January 17	South Carolina	Clemson Field House • Calhoun, South Carolina	W 31–30
January 18*	Presbyterian	Clemson Field House • Calhoun, South Carolina	W 46–27
January 25*	Georgia Tech	Clemson Field House • Calhoun, South Carolina	W 39–31
February 1*	at Furman	Greenville, South Carolina	W 41–33
February 5	at Virginia Tech	Blacksburg, Virginia	W 46–32
February 6	at Washington and Lee	Lexington, Virginia	L 26–34
February 7	at VMI	VMI Field House • Lexington, Virginia	W 43–36
February 12*	at Georgia	Woodruff Hall • Athens, Georgia	L 13–33
February 14*	Furman	Clemson Field House • Calhoun, South Carolina	W 50–23
February 15	at South Carolina	Carolina Fieldhouse • Columbia, South Carolina	W 43–30
February 18	NC State	Clemson Field House • Calhoun, South Carolina	L 21–27
February 20*	Georgia	Clemson Field House • Calhoun, South Carolina	W 27–24
February 24	North Carolina	Clemson Field House • Calhoun, South Carolina	L 34–35 (OT)
February 26*	at Wofford	Andrews Field House • Spartanburg, South Carolina	W 20–19
March 5*	vs. NC State	Thompson Gym • Raleigh, North Carolina (Southern Conference tournament)	L 31–32 (OT)
*Non-Conference Game.

== 1936–37 ==
1936–37 Clemson Tigers men's basketball
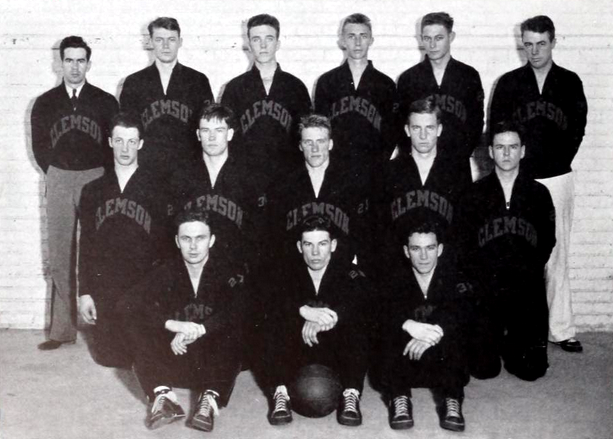
- Conference: Southern Conference
- Record: 6–15 (3–7 SoCon)
- Head coach: Joe Davis
- Home arena: Clemson Field House

1936–37 Southern Conference men's basketball standings
	Conf.				Overall
Team	W		L	PCT	W		L	PCT
Washington and Lee †	11	–	1	.917	17	–	4	.810
North Carolina	14	–	3	.824	18	–	5	.783
Wake Forest	9	–	4	.692	15	–	6	.714
North Carolina State	14	–	7	.667	15	–	9	.625
Duke	11	–	6	.647	15	–	8	.652
South Carolina	7	–	4	.636	13	–	7	.650
Richmond	5	–	4	.556	13	–	7	.650
Virginia	6	–	7	.462	9	–	10	.474
Furman	3	–	4	.429	8	–	7	.533
Davidson	5	–	8	.385	13	–	10	.565
Maryland	5	–	8	.385	8	–	12	.400
Virginia Tech	4	–	9	.308	6	–	11	.353
VMI	5	–	11	.313	6	–	11	.353
Clemson	2	–	7	.222	6	–	15	.286
The Citadel	0	–	5	.000	7	–	12	.368
William & Mary	0	–	13	.000	0	–	18	.000
† Southern Conference Tournament winner

Date	Opponent	Site	Result
December 16	Duke	Clemson Field House • Calhoun, South Carolina	L 25–33
December 17*	at Tennessee	Alumni Memorial Gym • Knoxville, Tennessee	L 22–33
January 4*	at Florida	Building R • Gainesville, Florida	L 36–52
January 5*	at Florida	Building R • Gainesville, Florida	W 31–30 (OT)
January 11	at NC State	Thompson Gym • Raleigh, North Carolina	L 29–54
January 12	Wake Forest	Clemson Field House • Calhoun, South Carolina	L 36–53
January 14*	at Wofford	Andrews Field House • Spartanburg, South Carolina	W 38–31
January 20*	at Georgia Tech	Naval Armory • Atlanta	L 13–51
January 23*	Georgia	Clemson Field House • Calhoun, South Carolina	L 35–36 (OT)
January 30*	at Presbyterian	Clinton, South Carolina	L 27–30
February 3	at Furman	Greenville, South Carolina	W 40–34 (OT)
February 5	at South Carolina	Carolina Fieldhouse • Columbia, South Carolina	L 30–32 (OT)
February 9	NC State	Clemson Field House • Calhoun, South Carolina	L 40–41
February 12	The Citadel	Clemson Field House • Calhoun, South Carolina	W 44–38
February 13*	at Georgia	Woodruff Hall • Athens, Georgia	L 20–29
February 15*	Alabama Polytechnic	Clemson Field House • Calhoun, South Carolina	L 33–41
February 16*	Alabama Polytechnic	Clemson Field House • Calhoun, South Carolina	L 26–33
February 18	Wake Forest	Clemson Field House • Calhoun, South Carolina	L 27–29
February 20	Furman	Clemson Field House • Calhoun, South Carolina	L 25–29
February 23	South Carolina	Clemson Field House • Calhoun, South Carolina	W 31–29
February 25*	at Wofford	Andrews Field House • Spartanburg, South Carolina	W 33–32
*Non-Conference Game.

== 1937–38 ==
1937–38 Clemson Tigers men's basketball
- Conference: Southern Conference
- Record: 16–7 (9–4 SoCon)
- Head coach: Joe Davis
- Home arena: Clemson Field House

1937–38 Southern Conference men's basketball standings
	Conf.				Overall
Team	W		L	PCT	W		L	PCT
North Carolina	13	–	3	.813	16	–	5	.762
North Carolina State	10	–	3	.769	13	–	6	.684
The Citadel	7	–	3	.700	13	–	5	.722
Clemson	9	–	4	.692	16	–	7	.696
Duke †	9	–	5	.643	15	–	9	.625
Richmond	7	–	4	.636	15	–	5	.750
Maryland	6	–	4	.600	15	–	9	.625
Washington and Lee	6	–	5	.545	12	–	9	.571
Wake Forest	7	–	8	.467	7	–	12	.368
Virginia Tech	4	–	5	.444	6	–	8	.429
Davidson	4	–	11	.267	10	–	12	.455
Furman	2	–	6	.250	6	–	13	.316
VMI	2	–	7	.222	4	–	11	.267
South Carolina	2	–	12	.143	3	–	21	.125
William & Mary	0	–	9	.000	2	–	10	.167
† Southern Conference Tournament winner

Date	Opponent	Site	Result
December 17*	Tennessee	Clemson Field House • Calhoun, South Carolina	W 28–15
January 8	at Davidson	Davidson, North Carolina	W 41–26
January 11*	at Georgia	Woodruff Hall • Athens, Georgia	L 22–26
January 13*	Presbyterian	Clemson Field House • Calhoun, South Carolina	W 39–29
January 15	NC State	Clemson Field House • Calhoun, South Carolina	L 31–33 (OT)
January 18*	Wofford	Clemson Field House • Calhoun, South Carolina	W 60–36
January 22	Furman	Clemson Field House • Calhoun, South Carolina	W 46–15
February 1	at North Carolina	Chapel Hill, North Carolina	L 34–44
February 2	at Wake Forest	Gore Gymnasium • Wake Forest, North Carolina	W 42–33
February 3	at NC State	Thompson Gym • Raleigh, North Carolina	L 35–55
February 8*	Georgia	Clemson Field House • Calhoun, South Carolina	W 40–28
February 11	at South Carolina	Carolina Fieldhouse • Columbia, South Carolina	W 54–38
February 12	at The Citadel	Charleston, South Carolina	L 26–28
February 15	at Furman	Greenville, South Carolina	W 43–35
February 16	Wake Forest	Clemson Field House • Calhoun, South Carolina	W 46–40
February 19	South Carolina	Clemson Field House • Calhoun, South Carolina	W 58–39
February 21*	at Davidson	Davidson, North Carolina	W 35–34
February 23*	at Georgia Tech	Naval Armory • Atlanta	L 33–53
February 25	The Citadel	Clemson Field House • Calhoun, South Carolina	W 47–35
February 28*	at Wofford	Andrews Field House • Spartanburg, South Carolina	W 52–24
March 3*	vs. Richmond	Thompson Gym • Raleigh, North Carolina (Southern Conference tournament quarterfinal)	W 35–32
March 4*	vs. Washington and Lee	Thompson Gym • Raleigh, North Carolina (Southern Conference tournament semifinal)	W 38–33
March 5*	vs. Duke	Thompson Gym • Raleigh, North Carolina (Southern Conference tournament Final)	L 30–40
*Non-Conference Game.

== 1938–39 ==
1938–39 Clemson Tigers men's basketball

Southern Conference Champions
- Conference: Southern Conference
- Record: 16–8 (6–6 SoCon)
- Head coach: Joe Davis
- Home arena: Clemson Field House

1938–39 Southern Conference men's basketball standings
	Conf.				Overall
Team	W		L	PCT	W		L	PCT
Wake Forest	15	–	3	.833	18	–	6	.750
Maryland	8	–	3	.727	15	–	9	.625
Washington and Lee	8	–	3	.727	13	–	9	.591
The Citadel	7	–	3	.700	14	–	5	.737
Davidson	9	–	7	.563	19	–	10	.655
North Carolina	8	–	7	.533	10	–	11	.476
North Carolina State	7	–	6	.538	10	–	7	.588
Duke	8	–	8	.500	10	–	12	.455
Clemson †	6	–	6	.500	16	–	8	.667
VMI	6	–	6	.500	7	–	10	.412
Richmond	5	–	5	.500	10	–	10	.500
William & Mary	4	–	9	.308	9	–	12	.429
South Carolina	2	–	8	.200	5	–	18	.217
Virginia Tech	2	–	10	.167	3	–	14	.176
Furman	0	–	10	.000	6	–	16	.273
† Southern Conference Tournament winner

Date	Opponent	Site	Result
December 10*	at Tennessee	Alumni Memorial Gym • Knoxville, Tennessee	L 24–29
December 15	at Maryland	Ritchie Coliseum • College Park, Maryland	L 35–45
December 16	at George Washington	Washington, D.C.	L 44–47
December 17*	at Catholic	Washington, D.C.	W 33–30
January 4	Wake Forest	Clemson Field House • Calhoun, South Carolina	L 38–39
January 7*	at Georgia	Woodruff Hall • Athens, Georgia	W 37–30
January 10	at Duke	Card Gymnasium • Durham, North Carolina	L 33–39
January 11	at NC State	Thompson Gym • Raleigh, North Carolina	L 37–54
January 12	at Wake Forest	Gore Gymnasium • Wake Forest, North Carolina	L 38–44
January 18*	at Presbyterian	Clinton, South Carolina	W 51–43
January 21	Furman	Clemson Field House • Calhoun, South Carolina	W 43–31
January 28*	Wofford	Clemson Field House • Calhoun, South Carolina	W 62–37
February 6*	Georgia	Clemson Field House • Calhoun, South Carolina	W 38–29
February 10	at South Carolina	Carolina Fieldhouse • Columbia, South Carolina	W 38–16
February 11	at The Citadel	Thompson Hall • Charleston, South Carolina	L 38–42
February 13	Duke	Clemson Field House • Calhoun, South Carolina	W 38–36
February 18	South Carolina	Clemson Field House • Calhoun, South Carolina	W 43–16
February 20	The Citadel	Clemson Field House • Calhoun, South Carolina	W 51–36
February 22	at Furman	Greenville, South Carolina	W 41–28
February 23*	at Wofford	Andrews Field House • Spartanburg, South Carolina	W 29–22
March 1*	vs. North Carolina	Thompson Gym • Raleigh, North Carolina (Southern Conference tournament first round)	W 44–43
March 2*	vs. Wake Forest	Thompson Gym • Raleigh, North Carolina (Southern Conference tournament quarterfinal)	W 30–28
March 3*	vs. Davidson	Thompson Gym • Raleigh, North Carolina (Southern Conference tournament semifinal)	W 49–33
March 4*	vs. Maryland	Thompson Gym • Raleigh, North Carolina (Southern Conference tournament Final)	W 39–27
*Non-Conference Game.
