= 1936–37 William & Mary Indians men's basketball team =

American college basketball season

1936–37 William & Mary Indians men's basketball
- Conference: Southern Conference
- Record: 0–18 (0–13 Southern)
- Head coach: Tom Dowler (3rd season)
- Home arena: Blow Gymnasium

The 1936–37 William & Mary Indians men's basketball team represented the College of William & Mary in intercollegiate basketball during the 1936–37 season. Under the third year of head coach Tom Dowler, the team finished the season 0–18, 0–13 in Southern Conference play. This was the 32nd season of the collegiate basketball program at William & Mary, whose nickname is now the Tribe. As of 2019, this has remained William & Mary men's basketball's worst single season record and winning percentage and its only winless season.

After playing as an independent for the previous 31 seasons, this was William & Mary's first season as members of the Southern Conference. They finished in 16th place and did not quality for the 1937 Southern Conference men's basketball tournament in Raleigh, North Carolina.

== Schedule ==
1936–37 Southern Conference men's basketball standings
	Conf.				Overall
Team	W		L	PCT	W		L	PCT
Washington and Lee †	11	–	1	.917	17	–	4	.810
North Carolina	14	–	3	.824	18	–	5	.783
Wake Forest	9	–	4	.692	15	–	6	.714
North Carolina State	14	–	7	.667	15	–	9	.625
Duke	11	–	6	.647	15	–	8	.652
South Carolina	7	–	4	.636	13	–	7	.650
Richmond	5	–	4	.556	13	–	7	.650
Virginia	6	–	7	.462	9	–	10	.474
Furman	3	–	4	.429	8	–	7	.533
Davidson	5	–	8	.385	13	–	10	.565
Maryland	5	–	8	.385	8	–	12	.400
Virginia Tech	4	–	9	.308	6	–	11	.353
VMI	5	–	11	.313	6	–	11	.353
Clemson	2	–	7	.222	6	–	15	.286
The Citadel	0	–	5	.000	7	–	12	.368
William & Mary	0	–	13	.000	0	–	18	.000
† Southern Conference Tournament winner

Date time, TV	Rank^{#}	Opponent^{#}	Result	Record	Site city, state
Regular season
		at NC State	L 21–49	0–1 (0–1)	Thompson Gym; Raleigh, NC
		at Wake Forest	L 29–49	0–2 (0–2)	Gore Gymnasium; Wake Forest, NC
		at Virginia	L 30–33	0–3 (0–3)	Memorial Gymnasium; Charlottesville, VA
		at VPI	L 29–36	0–4 (0–4)	War Memorial Gymnasium; Blacksburg, VA
		at Washington and Lee	L 15–64	0–5 (0–5)	Doremus Gymnasium; Lexington, VA
		at VMI	L 39–42	0–6 (0–6)	Cormack Field House; Lexington, VA
*		at Roanoke	L 39–48	0–7	Roanoke, VA
		Wake Forest	L 25–61	0–8 (0–7)	Blow Gymnasium; Williamsburg, VA
		VPI	L 30–38	0–9 (0–8)	Blow Gymnasium; Williamsburg, VA
2/4/1937		Richmond	L 22–48	0–10 (0–9)	Blow Gymnasium; Williamsburg, VA
*		Roanoke College	L 21–40	0–11	Blow Gymnasium; Williamsburg, VA
2/9/1937*		at Maryland	L 29–41	0–12	Ritchie Coliseum; College Park, MD
2/10/1937*		at Navy	W 26–25	0–13	Dahlgren Hall; Annapolis, MD
*		Randolph–Macon	L 27–58	0–14	Blow Gymnasium; Williamsburg, VA
2/17/1937		at Richmond	L 21–40	0–15 (0–10)	Millhiser Gymnasium; Richmond, VA
		VMI	L 26–49	0–16 (0–11)	Blow Gymnasium; Williamsburg, VA
		NC State	L 20–58	0–17 (0–12)	Blow Gymnasium; Williamsburg, VA
		Virginia	L 21–52	0–18 (0–13)	Blow Gymnasium; Williamsburg, VA
*Non-conference game. ^{#}Rankings from AP Poll. (#) Tournament seedings in parentheses.
