= 1937–38 Duke Blue Devils men's basketball team =

American college basketball season

1937–38 Duke Blue Devils men's basketball

SoCon Tournament champions
- Conference: Southern Conference
- Record: 15–9 (9–5 Southern)
- Head coach: Eddie Cameron
- Home arena: Card Gymnasium

1937–38 Southern Conference men's basketball standings
	Conf.				Overall
Team	W		L	PCT	W		L	PCT
North Carolina	13	–	3	.813	16	–	5	.762
North Carolina State	10	–	3	.769	13	–	6	.684
The Citadel	7	–	3	.700	13	–	5	.722
Clemson	9	–	4	.692	16	–	7	.696
Duke †	9	–	5	.643	15	–	9	.625
Richmond	7	–	4	.636	15	–	5	.750
Maryland	6	–	4	.600	15	–	9	.625
Washington and Lee	6	–	5	.545	12	–	9	.571
Wake Forest	7	–	8	.467	7	–	12	.368
Virginia Tech	4	–	5	.444	6	–	8	.429
Davidson	4	–	11	.267	10	–	12	.455
Furman	2	–	6	.250	6	–	13	.316
VMI	2	–	7	.222	4	–	11	.267
South Carolina	2	–	12	.143	3	–	21	.125
William & Mary	0	–	9	.000	2	–	10	.167
† Southern Conference Tournament winner

The 1937–38 Duke Blue Devils men's basketball team represented Duke University during the 1937–38 men's college basketball season. The head coach was Eddie Cameron, coaching his 10th season with the Blue Devils. The team finished with an overall record of 15–9.
