= 1938–39 William & Mary Indians men's basketball team =

American college basketball season

1938–39 William & Mary Indians men's basketball
- Conference: Southern Conference
- Record: 9–12 (4–9 SoCon)
- Head coach: John Kellison (7th season)
- Home arena: Blow Gymnasium

The 1938–39 William & Mary Indians men's basketball team represented the College of William & Mary in intercollegiate basketball during the 1938–39 season. Under the second year of head coach John Kellison's second stint with William & Mary, the team finished the season 9–12 and 4–9 in the Southern Conference. This was the 34th season of the collegiate basketball program at William & Mary, whose nickname is now the Tribe.

The Indians finished 12th in the conference and did not quality for the 1939 Southern Conference men's basketball tournament. However, the Indians did record their first ever conference victories during 1939.

== Schedule ==
1938–39 Southern Conference men's basketball standings
	Conf.				Overall
Team	W		L	PCT	W		L	PCT
Wake Forest	15	–	3	.833	18	–	6	.750
Maryland	8	–	3	.727	15	–	9	.625
Washington and Lee	8	–	3	.727	13	–	9	.591
The Citadel	7	–	3	.700	14	–	5	.737
Davidson	9	–	7	.563	19	–	10	.655
North Carolina	8	–	7	.533	10	–	11	.476
North Carolina State	7	–	6	.538	10	–	7	.588
Duke	8	–	8	.500	10	–	12	.455
Clemson †	6	–	6	.500	16	–	8	.667
VMI	6	–	6	.500	7	–	10	.412
Richmond	5	–	5	.500	10	–	10	.500
William & Mary	4	–	9	.308	9	–	12	.429
South Carolina	2	–	8	.200	5	–	18	.217
Virginia Tech	2	–	10	.167	3	–	14	.176
Furman	0	–	10	.000	6	–	16	.273
† Southern Conference Tournament winner

Date time, TV	Rank^{#}	Opponent^{#}	Result	Record	Site city, state
Regular season
		Davidson	L 35–45	0–1 (0–1)	Blow Gymnasium; Williamsburg, VA
		at NC State	W 32–28	1–1 (1–1)	Thompson Gym; Raleigh, NC
		at Wake Forest	L 35–58	1–2 (1–2)	Gore Gymnasium; Wake Forest, NC
*		Virginia	W 48–38	2–2	Blow Gymnasium; Williamsburg, VA
		at Washington and Lee	L 42–62	2–3 (1–3)	Doremus Gymnasium; Lexington, VA
		at VPI	W 46–33	3–3 (2–3)	War Memorial Gymnasium; Blacksburg, VA
		VMI	L 43–48	3–4 (2–4)	Blow Gymnasium; Williamsburg, VA
*		Randolph–Macon	W 60–37	4–4	Blow Gymnasium; Williamsburg, VA
*		Virginia	L 37–39	4–5	Blow Gymnasium; Williamsburg, VA
*		Hampden–Sydney	W 64–40	5–5	Blow Gymnasium; Williamsburg, VA
*		at Langley Field	W 46–38	6–5	Hampton, VA
		VPI	W 57–30	7–5 (3–4)	Blow Gymnasium; Williamsburg, VA
*		at Randolph–Macon	W 36–25	8–5	Ashland, VA
2/11/1939		Richmond	L 37–39	8–6 (3–5)	Blow Gymnasium; Williamsburg, VA
2/13/1939*		at Saint Joseph's	L 43–52	8–7	Philadelphia, PA
2/14/1939		at Maryland	W 57–49	9–7 (4–5)	Ritchie Coliseum; College Park, MD
2/15/1939*		at Navy	L 29–52	9–8	Annapolis, MD
		Washington and Lee	L 37–46	9–9 (4–6)	Blow Gymnasium; Williamsburg, VA
		Wake Forest	L 42–46	9–10 (4–7)	Blow Gymnasium; Williamsburg, VA
2/23/1939		at Richmond	L 31–40	9–11 (4–8)	Millhiser Gymnasium; Richmond, VA
		VMI	L 31–45	9–12 (4–9)	Blow Gymnasium; Williamsburg, VA
*Non-conference game. ^{#}Rankings from AP Poll. (#) Tournament seedings in parentheses.
