= The Citadel Bulldogs basketball, 1930–1939 =

The Citadel Bulldogs basketball teams represented The Citadel, The Military College of South Carolina in Charleston, South Carolina, United States. The program was established in 1900–01, and has continuously fielded a team since 1912–13. Their primary rivals are College of Charleston, Furman and VMI.

== 1929–30 ==
1929–30 The Citadel Bulldogs men's basketball
- Conference: Southern Intercollegiate Athletic Association
- Record: 10–11 ( SIAA)
- Head coach: Benny Blatt

Date time, TV	Opponent	Result	Record	Site city, state
January 1*	at Parris Island Marines	L 41–45	0–1	Parris Island, South Carolina
January 2*	at Parris Island Marines	W 36–33	1–1	Parris Island, South Carolina
January 3*	at Augusta YMCA	W 38–29	2–1	Augusta, Georgia
January 4*	at Atlanta YMCA	L 21–36	2–2	Atlanta
January 6*	at Fort Benning	L 41–63	2–3	Columbus, Georgia
January 7*	at Fort Benning	L 36–58	2–4	Columbus, Georgia
January 8*	at Mercer	L 35–53	2–5	Macon, Georgia
January 10*	Erskine	L 21–32	2–6	Charleston, South Carolina
January 11*	Erskine	L 20–28	2–7	Charleston, South Carolina
January 17*	Wofford	W 38–18	3–7	Charleston, South Carolina
January 18*	South Carolina	W 31–27	4–7	Charleston, South Carolina
January 25*	Furman	L 20–43	4–8	Charleston, South Carolina
January 31*	Presbyterian	W 53–41	5–8	Charleston, South Carolina
February 1*	Presbyterian	W 38–20	6–8	Charleston, South Carolina
February 12*	at South Carolina	L 31–32	6–9	Columbia, South Carolina
February 13*	at Newberry	W 34–28	7–9	Newberry, South Carolina
February 14*	at Wofford	W 45–21	8–9	Spartanburg, South Carolina
February 15*	at Furman	L 25–52	8–10	Greenville, South Carolina
February 17*	at Clemson	L 35–38 ^{OT}	(8–11)	Clemson Field House; Calhoun, South Carolina
February 21*	Newberry	W 46–28	9–11	Charleston, South Carolina
March 1*	College of Charleston	W 50–44	10–11	Charleston, South Carolina
*Non-conference game. (#) Tournament seedings in parentheses. All times are in Eastern Time.

== 1930–31 ==
1930–31 The Citadel Bulldogs men's basketball
- Conference: Southern Intercollegiate Athletic Association
- Record: 6–9 ( SIAA)
- Head coach: Johnny Douglas

Date time, TV	Opponent	Result	Record	Site city, state
January 9*	Erskine	L 13–37	0–1	Charleston, South Carolina
January 10*	Erskine	L 23–26	0–2	Charleston, South Carolina
January 16*	Wofford	L 16–22	0–3	Charleston, South Carolina
January 24*	Furman	L 22–45	0–4	Charleston, South Carolina
January 31*	Newberry	W 49–35	1–4	Charleston, South Carolina
February 7*	College of Charleston	L 30–32	1–5	Charleston, South Carolina
February 12*	at South Carolina	W 22–19	2–5	Columbia, South Carolina
February 13*	at Newberry	W 33–26	3–5	Newberry, South Carolina
February 14*	at Wofford	W 32–28	4–5	Spartanburg, South Carolina
February 16*	at Furman	L 21–35	4–6	Greenville, South Carolina
February 17*	at Presbyterian	L 34–39	4–7	Clinton, South Carolina
February 18*	at Presbyterian	L 32–33	4–8	Clinton, South Carolina
February 21*	Davidson	W 22–21	5–8	Charleston, South Carolina
February 27*	College of Charleston	W 40–37	6–8	Charleston, South Carolina
February 28*	College of Charleston	L 26–30	6–9	Charleston, South Carolina
*Non-conference game. (#) Tournament seedings in parentheses. All times are in Eastern Time.

== 1931–32 ==
1931–32 The Citadel Bulldogs men's basketball
- Conference: Southern Intercollegiate Athletic Association
- Record: 8–11 ( SIAA)
- Head coach: Johnny Douglas

Date time, TV	Opponent	Result	Record	Site city, state
January 6*	at Jewish Alliance	W 42–23	1–0	
January 7*	at Stetson	L 29–39	1–1	DeLand, Florida
January 8*	at Stetson	L 24–29	1–2	DeLand, Florida
January 9*	at Rollins	W 45–22	2–2	Winter Park, Florida
January 11*	at Rollins	W 46–16	3–2	Winter Park, Florida
January 12*	at Sears	W 30–28	4–2	
January 17*	Wofford	W 24–20	5–2	Charleston, South Carolina
January 24*	Furman	L 24–26	5–3	Charleston, South Carolina
January 29*	Stetson	L 22–26	5–4	Charleston, South Carolina
January 30*	Newberry	L 26–32	5–5	Charleston, South Carolina
February 6	South Carolina	L 17–25	5–6	Charleston, South Carolina
February 12*	at Newberry	L 27–29	5–7	Newberry, South Carolina
February 13*	at Wofford	L 14–22	5–8	Spartanburg, South Carolina
February 15*	at Clemson	L 12–17	5–9	Clemson Field House; Calhoun, South Carolina
February 16*	at Furman	L 11–23	5–10	Greenville, South Carolina
February 17*	at South Carolina	L 22–24	5–11	Columbia, South Carolina
February 19*	at Davidson	W 32–21	6–11	Charleston, South Carolina
February 27*	College of Charleston	W 31–25	7–11	Charleston, South Carolina
March 4*	College of Charleston	W 36–21	8–11	Charleston, South Carolina
*Non-conference game. (#) Tournament seedings in parentheses. All times are in Eastern Time.

== 1932–33 ==
1932–33 The Citadel Bulldogs men's basketball
- Conference: Southern Intercollegiate Athletic Association
- Record: 4–11 ( SIAA)
- Head coach: Johnny Douglas

Date time, TV	Opponent	Result	Record	Site city, state
January 3*	at Parris Island Marines	W 31–26	1–0	Parris Island, South Carolina
January 4*	at Parris Island Marines	L 27–28	1–1	Parris Island, South Carolina
January 14*	Wofford	L 29–30	1–2	Charleston, South Carolina
January 22*	City League	L 14–36	1–3	Charleston, South Carolina
January 28*	Newberry	L 24–46	1–4	Charleston, South Carolina
February 4*	at Erskine	L 26–29	1–5	Charleston, South Carolina
February 8*	at South Carolina	L 36–57	1–6	Columbia, South Carolina
February 9*	at Newberry	L 30–37	1–7	Newberry, South Carolina
February 10*	at Erskine	L 30–33	1–8	Due West, South Carolina
February 11*	at Presbyterian	W 53–33	2–8	Clinton, South Carolina
February 13*	at Furman	L 30–33	2–9	Greenville, South Carolina
February 14*	at Wofford	L 24–33	2–10	Spartanburg, South Carolina
February 18*	Furman	L 19–28	2–11	Charleston, South Carolina
February 24*	College of Charleston	W 35–25	3–11	Charleston, South Carolina
February 25*	College of Charleston	W 38–21	4–11	Charleston, South Carolina
*Non-conference game. (#) Tournament seedings in parentheses. All times are in Eastern Time.

== 1933–34 ==
1933–34 The Citadel Bulldogs men's basketball
- Conference: Southern Intercollegiate Athletic Association
- Record: 8–7 ( SIAA)
- Head coach: Charlie Willard

Date time, TV	Opponent	Result	Record	Site city, state
January 5*	at Augusta YMCA	L 43–49	0–1	Augusta, Georgia
January 6*	at Augusta YMCA	W 42–38	1–1	Augusta, Georgia
January 12*	Wofford	L 15–26	1–2	Charleston, South Carolina
January 13*	Boston Celtics	L 34–42	1–3	Charleston, South Carolina
January 20*	College of Charleston	W 30–27	2–3	Charleston, South Carolina
January 27*	Newberry	W 44–25	3–3	Charleston, South Carolina
February 3*	Erskine	L 22–30	3–4	Charleston, South Carolina
February 16*	at Presbyterian	W 29–22	4–4	Clinton, South Carolina
February 17*	at Erskine	L 33–35	4–5	Due West, South Carolina
February 19*	at Furman	W 30–23	5–5	Greenville, South Carolina
February 20*	at Wofford	L 26–33	5–6	Spartanburg, South Carolina
February 21*	at Newberry	W 34–22	6–6	Newberry, South Carolina
February 24*	at Furman	W 30–22	7–6	Charleston, South Carolina
March 2*	College of Charleston	L 32–33	7–7	Charleston, South Carolina
March 3*	College of Charleston	W 35–32	8–7	Charleston, South Carolina
*Non-conference game. (#) Tournament seedings in parentheses. All times are in Eastern Time.

== 1934–35 ==
1934–35 The Citadel Bulldogs men's basketball
- Conference: Southern Intercollegiate Athletic Association
- Record: 5–9 ( SIAA)
- Head coach: Charlie Willard

Date time, TV	Opponent	Result	Record	Site city, state
January 11*	Presbyterian	W 26–24	1–0	Charleston, South Carolina
January 12*	South Carolina	L 17–33	1–1	Charleston, South Carolina
January 18	Wofford	L 23–39	1–2	Charleston, South Carolina
January 26*	at Newberry	W 37–36	2–2	Newberry, South Carolina
February 6*	at Newberry	W 39–33	3–2	Newberry, South Carolina
February 7*	at Presbyterian	W 44–39	4–2	Clinton, South Carolina
February 8*	at Erskine	W 31–22	5–2	Due West, South Carolina
February 9*	at Furman	L 30–45	5–3	Greenville, South Carolina
February 11*	at Wofford	L 30–43	5–4	Spartanburg, South Carolina
February 12*	at South Carolina	L 25–54	5–5	Columbia, South Carolina
February 15*	Erskine	L 26–27	5–6	Charleston, South Carolina
February 22*	Furman	L 22–34	5–7	Charleston, South Carolina
March 8*	College of Charleston	L 18–43	5–8	Charleston, South Carolina
March 9*	College of Charleston	L 18–33	5–9	Charleston, South Carolina
*Non-conference game. (#) Tournament seedings in parentheses. All times are in Eastern Time.

== 1935–36 ==
1935–36 The Citadel Bulldogs men's basketball
- Conference: Southern Intercollegiate Athletic Association
- Record: 7–5 ( SIAA)
- Head coach: Rock Norman

Date time, TV	Opponent	Result	Record	Site city, state
January 11*	Erskine	W 31–29	1–0	Charleston, South Carolina
January 18*	Wofford	L 34–42	1–1	Charleston, South Carolina
January 25*	Newberry	W 46–33	2–1	Charleston, South Carolina
January 31*	College of Charleston	W 31–28	3–1	Charleston, South Carolina
February 1*	Presbyterian	W 42–31	4–1	Charleston, South Carolina
February 8*	at Furman	L 33–40	4–2	Greenville, South Carolina
February 10*	at Wofford	L 39–40	4–3	Spartanburg, South Carolina
February 11*	at South Carolina	L 18–54	4–4	Columbia, South Carolina
February 17*	at Newberry	W 46–38	5–4	Newberry, South Carolina
February 18*	at Presbyterian	W 27–24	6–4	Clinton, South Carolina
February 19*	at Erskine	L 29–35	6–5	Due West, South Carolina
February 22*	Furman	W 32–30	7–5	Charleston, South Carolina
*Non-conference game. (#) Tournament seedings in parentheses. All times are in Eastern Time.

== 1936–37 ==
1936–37 The Citadel Bulldogs men's basketball
- Conference: Southern Conference
- Record: 7–12 (0–7 SoCon)

1936–37 Southern Conference men's basketball standings
	Conf.				Overall
Team	W		L	PCT	W		L	PCT
Washington and Lee †	11	–	1	.917	17	–	4	.810
North Carolina	14	–	3	.824	18	–	5	.783
Wake Forest	9	–	4	.692	15	–	6	.714
North Carolina State	14	–	7	.667	15	–	9	.625
Duke	11	–	6	.647	15	–	8	.652
South Carolina	7	–	4	.636	13	–	7	.650
Richmond	5	–	4	.556	13	–	7	.650
Virginia	6	–	7	.462	9	–	10	.474
Furman	3	–	4	.429	8	–	7	.533
Davidson	5	–	8	.385	13	–	10	.565
Maryland	5	–	8	.385	8	–	12	.400
Virginia Tech	4	–	9	.308	6	–	11	.353
VMI	5	–	11	.313	6	–	11	.353
Clemson	2	–	7	.222	6	–	15	.286
The Citadel	0	–	5	.000	7	–	12	.368
William & Mary	0	–	13	.000	0	–	18	.000
† Southern Conference Tournament winner

Date time, TV	Opponent	Result	Record	Site city, state
January 9*	Erskine	W 26–15	1–0	Charleston, South Carolina
January 15	Furman	L 26–28	1–1 (0–1)	Charleston, South Carolina
January 16*	Wofford	L 23–39	1–2	Charleston, South Carolina
January 23*	College of Charleston	L	1–3	Charleston, South Carolina
January 30*	Newberry	W 44–22	2–3	Charleston, South Carolina
February 1*	at Presbyterian	W 27–16	3–3	Clinton, South Carolina
February 2*	at Erskine	L 23–24	3–4	Due West, South Carolina
February 3*	at Newberry	L 31–34	3–5	Newberry, South Carolina
February 6*	Davidson	L 37–46	3–6 (0–2)	Charleston, South Carolina
February 12	at Clemson	L 38–44	3–7 (0–3)	Clemson Field House; Calhoun, South Carolina
February 13*	at Wofford	W 39–24	4–7	Spartanburg, South Carolina
February 15	at Davidson	L 34–46	4–8 (0–3)	Alumni Gymnasium; Davidson, North Carolina
February 16	at Furman	L 28–44	4–9 (0–4)	Greenville, South Carolina
February 19	at Wake Forest	L 18–42	4–10 (0–5)	Wake Forest, North Carolina
February 20*	College of Charleston	W 41–35	5–10	Charleston, South Carolina
February 22*	at College of Charleston	W 32–27	6–10	Charleston, South Carolina
February 26*	Presbyterian	W 31–30	7–10	Charleston, South Carolina
February 27	South Carolina	L 27–48	7–11 (0–6)	Charleston, South Carolina
March 1	at South Carolina	W 32–24	7–12 (0–7)	Columbia, South Carolina
*Non-conference game. (#) Tournament seedings in parentheses. All times are in Eastern Time.

== 1937–38 ==
1937–38 The Citadel Bulldogs men's basketball
- Conference: Southern Conference
- Record: 13–5 (7–3 SoCon)
- Head coach: Rock Norman

1937–38 Southern Conference men's basketball standings
	Conf.				Overall
Team	W		L	PCT	W		L	PCT
North Carolina	13	–	3	.813	16	–	5	.762
North Carolina State	10	–	3	.769	13	–	6	.684
The Citadel	7	–	3	.700	13	–	5	.722
Clemson	9	–	4	.692	16	–	7	.696
Duke †	9	–	5	.643	15	–	9	.625
Richmond	7	–	4	.636	15	–	5	.750
Maryland	6	–	4	.600	15	–	9	.625
Washington and Lee	6	–	5	.545	12	–	9	.571
Wake Forest	7	–	8	.467	7	–	12	.368
Virginia Tech	4	–	5	.444	6	–	8	.429
Davidson	4	–	11	.267	10	–	12	.455
Furman	2	–	6	.250	6	–	13	.316
VMI	2	–	7	.222	4	–	11	.267
South Carolina	2	–	12	.143	3	–	21	.125
William & Mary	0	–	9	.000	2	–	10	.167
† Southern Conference Tournament winner

Date time, TV	Opponent	Result	Record	Site city, state
January 7	Furman	W 37–17	1–0 (1–0)	Charleston, South Carolina
January 8	South Carolina	W 31–21	2–0 (2–0)	Charleston, South Carolina
January 14*	Erskine	W 28–24	3–0	Charleston, South Carolina
January 22*	Wofford	L 31–33	3–1	Charleston, South Carolina
January 29*	Presbyterian	W 37–18	4–1	Charleston, South Carolina
January 30*	Newberry	W 45–31	5–1	Charleston, South Carolina
February 4	at Davidson	W 33–29	6–1 (3–0)	Alumni Gymnasium; Davidson, North Carolina
February 5	at Wake Forest	L 33–45	6–2 (3–1)	Wake Forest, North Carolina
February 7	at NC State	L 29–43	6–3 (3–2)	Thompson Gym; Raleigh, North Carolina
February 12	Clemson	W 28–26	7–3 (4–2)	Charleston, South Carolina
February 15	at South Carolina	W 37–27	8–3 (5–2)	Columbia, South Carolina
February 16*	at Wofford	W 39–35	9–3	Spartanburg, South Carolina
February 17	at Furman	W 46–36	10–3 (6–2)	Greenville, South Carolina
February 19	Davidson	W 28–26	11–3 (7–2)	Charleston, South Carolina
February 25	at Clemson	L 35–47	11–4 (7–3)	Clemson Field House; Calhoun, South Carolina
February 26*	at Newberry	W 58–45	12–4	Newberry, South Carolina
February 28*	at Presbyterian	W 44–30	13–4	Clinton, South Carolina
1938 Southern Conference men's basketball tournament
March 3	vs. Maryland	L 43–45	13–5	Thompson Gym; Raleigh, North Carolina
*Non-conference game. (#) Tournament seedings in parentheses. All times are in Eastern Time.

== 1938–39 ==
1938–39 The Citadel Bulldogs men's basketball
- Conference: Southern Conference
- Record: 13–5 (7–4 SoCon)
- Head coach: Rock Norman
- Home arena: Thompson Hall

1938–39 Southern Conference men's basketball standings
	Conf.				Overall
Team	W		L	PCT	W		L	PCT
Wake Forest	15	–	3	.833	18	–	6	.750
Maryland	8	–	3	.727	15	–	9	.625
Washington and Lee	8	–	3	.727	13	–	9	.591
The Citadel	7	–	3	.700	14	–	5	.737
Davidson	9	–	7	.563	19	–	10	.655
North Carolina	8	–	7	.533	10	–	11	.476
North Carolina State	7	–	6	.538	10	–	7	.588
Duke	8	–	8	.500	10	–	12	.455
Clemson †	6	–	6	.500	16	–	8	.667
VMI	6	–	6	.500	7	–	10	.412
Richmond	5	–	5	.500	10	–	10	.500
William & Mary	4	–	9	.308	9	–	12	.429
South Carolina	2	–	8	.200	5	–	18	.217
Virginia Tech	2	–	10	.167	3	–	14	.176
Furman	0	–	10	.000	6	–	16	.273
† Southern Conference Tournament winner

With season sweeps of South Carolina, Furman, Wofford, and Presbyterian, a win in their only matchup with Newberry and a season split with Clemson, the Bulldogs claim a South Carolina "state championship" for the 1938–39 season.

Date time, TV	Opponent	Result	Record	Site city, state
December 14	at Duke	L 37–49	0–1 (0–1)	Card Gymnasium; Durham, South Carolina
December 16	at Richmond	W 39–24	1–1 (1–1)	Millhiser Gymnasium; Richmond, Virginia
December 17	at George Washington	L 35–46	1–2 (1–2)	Washington, D.C.
December 19*	at Catholic University	W 48–37	2–2	Washington, D.C.
January 6	Furman	W 32–28	3–2 (2–2)	Thompson Hall; Charleston, South Carolina
January 13	South Carolina	W 40–37	4–2 (3–2)	Thompson Hall; Charleston, South Carolina
January 21*	Wofford	W 44–32	5–2	Thompson Hall; Charleston, South Carolina
February 3*	at Presbyterian	W 39–37	6–2	Clinton, South Carolina
February 4	at Davidson	L 32–46	6–3 (3–3)	Alumni Gymnasium; Davidson, North Carolina
February 12	Clemson	W 42–38	7–3 (4–3)	Thompson Hall; Charleston, South Carolina
February 14	at South Carolina	W 50–38	8–3 (5–3)	Columbia, South Carolina
February 15*	at Wofford	W 31–23	9–3	Spartanburg, South Carolina
February 16	at Furman	W 56–34	10–3 (6–3)	Greenville, South Carolina
February 18	Davidson	W 45–30	11–3 (7–3)	Thompson Hall; Charleston, South Carolina
February 20	at Clemson	L 36–51	11–4 (7–4)	Clemson Field House; Calhoun, South Carolina
February 21*	at Newberry	W 49–48	12–4	Newberry, South Carolina
February 25*	at Presbyterian	W 55–39	13–4	Clinton, South Carolina
1939 Southern Conference men's basketball tournament
March 2	vs. NC State	L 38–40	13–5	Thompson Gym; Raleigh, North Carolina
*Non-conference game. (#) Tournament seedings in parentheses. All times are in Eastern Time.
