= 1934–35 Duke Blue Devils men's basketball team =

American college basketball season

1934–35 Duke Blue Devils men's basketball
- Conference: Southern Conference
- Record: 18–8 (10–4 Southern)
- Head coach: Eddie Cameron
- Home arena: Card Gymnasium

1934–35 Southern Conference men's basketball standings
	Conf.				Overall
Team	W		L	PCT	W		L	PCT
North Carolina †	12	–	1	.923	23	–	2	.920
Clemson	3	–	1	.750	15	–	3	.833
Duke	10	–	4	.714	18	–	8	.692
Virginia	7	–	5	.583	13	–	9	.591
Maryland	4	–	3	.571	8	–	10	.444
North Carolina State	6	–	5	.545	10	–	9	.526
South Carolina	5	–	7	.417	15	–	9	.625
Washington and Lee	4	–	8	.333	10	–	10	.500
VMI	2	–	9	.182	3	–	14	.176
Virginia Tech	1	–	11	.083	3	–	16	.158
† Southern Conference Tournament winner

The 1934–35 Duke Blue Devils men's basketball team represented Duke University during the 1934–35 men's college basketball season. The head coach was Eddie Cameron, coaching his seventh season with the Blue Devils. The team finished with an overall record of 18–8.
