= 1938 Southern Conference men's basketball tournament =

- Classification: Division I
- Teams: 8
- Site: Thompson Gym; Raleigh, NC
- Champions: Duke (1st title)
- Winning coach: Eddie Cameron (1st title)

1937–38 Southern Conference men's basketball standings
	Conf.				Overall
Team	W		L	PCT	W		L	PCT
North Carolina	13	–	3	.813	16	–	5	.762
North Carolina State	10	–	3	.769	13	–	6	.684
The Citadel	7	–	3	.700	13	–	5	.722
Clemson	9	–	4	.692	16	–	7	.696
Duke †	9	–	5	.643	15	–	9	.625
Richmond	7	–	4	.636	15	–	5	.750
Maryland	6	–	4	.600	15	–	9	.625
Washington and Lee	6	–	5	.545	12	–	9	.571
Wake Forest	7	–	8	.467	7	–	12	.368
Virginia Tech	4	–	5	.444	6	–	8	.429
Davidson	4	–	11	.267	10	–	12	.455
Furman	2	–	6	.250	6	–	13	.316
VMI	2	–	7	.222	4	–	11	.267
South Carolina	2	–	12	.143	3	–	21	.125
William & Mary	0	–	9	.000	2	–	10	.167
† Southern Conference Tournament winner

The 1938 Southern Conference men's basketball tournament took place from March 3–5, 1938 at Thompson Gym in Raleigh, North Carolina. The Duke Blue Devils won their first Southern Conference title, led by head coach Eddie Cameron.

== Format ==
The top eight finishers of the conference's fifteen members were eligible for the tournament. Teams were seeded based on conference winning percentage. The tournament used a preset bracket consisting of three rounds.

== Bracket ==
Quarterfinals; March 3
Clemson	35
Richmond	32
Washington and Lee	48
North Carolina	33
Maryland	45
The Citadel	43
Duke	44
NC State	33

Semifinals; March 4
Clemson	38
Washington and Lee	33
Maryland	32
Duke	35

Finals; March 5
Clemson	30
Duke	40

* Overtime game

== See also ==
- List of Southern Conference men's basketball champions
