= 1933–34 Duke Blue Devils men's basketball team =

American college basketball season

1933–34 Duke Blue Devils men's basketball
- Conference: Southern Conference
- Record: 18–6 (9–4 Southern)
- Head coach: Eddie Cameron
- Home arena: Card Gymnasium

1933–34 Southern Conference men's basketball standings
	Conf.				Overall
Team	W		L	PCT	W		L	PCT
South Carolina	6	–	0	1.000	18	–	1	.947
North Carolina	12	–	2	.857	18	–	4	.818
Maryland	6	–	1	.857	11	–	8	.579
Duke	9	–	4	.692	18	–	6	.750
North Carolina State	6	–	5	.545	11	–	6	.647
Washington and Lee †	4	–	5	.444	10	–	6	.625
VMI	3	–	6	.333	4	–	9	.308
Virginia	1	–	9	.100	7	–	11	.389
Virginia Tech	1	–	10	.091	1	–	15	.063
Clemson	0	–	6	.000	7	–	12	.368
† Southern Conference Tournament winner

The 1933–34 Duke Blue Devils men's basketball team represented Duke University during the 1933–34 men's college basketball season. The head coach was Eddie Cameron, coaching his sixth season with the Blue Devils. The team finished with an overall record of 18–6.
