= 1938–39 Duke Blue Devils men's basketball team =

American college basketball season

1938–39 Duke Blue Devils men's basketball
- Conference: Southern Conference
- Record: 10–12 (8–8 Southern)
- Head coach: Eddie Cameron
- Home arena: Card Gymnasium

1938–39 Southern Conference men's basketball standings
	Conf.				Overall
Team	W		L	PCT	W		L	PCT
Wake Forest	15	–	3	.833	18	–	6	.750
Maryland	8	–	3	.727	15	–	9	.625
Washington and Lee	8	–	3	.727	13	–	9	.591
The Citadel	7	–	3	.700	14	–	5	.737
Davidson	9	–	7	.563	19	–	10	.655
North Carolina	8	–	7	.533	10	–	11	.476
North Carolina State	7	–	6	.538	10	–	7	.588
Duke	8	–	8	.500	10	–	12	.455
Clemson †	6	–	6	.500	16	–	8	.667
VMI	6	–	6	.500	7	–	10	.412
Richmond	5	–	5	.500	10	–	10	.500
William & Mary	4	–	9	.308	9	–	12	.429
South Carolina	2	–	8	.200	5	–	18	.217
Virginia Tech	2	–	10	.167	3	–	14	.176
Furman	0	–	10	.000	6	–	16	.273
† Southern Conference Tournament winner

The 1938–39 Duke Blue Devils men's basketball team represented Duke University during the 1938–39 men's college basketball season. The head coach was Eddie Cameron, coaching his 11th season with the Blue Devils. The team finished with an overall record of 10–12.
