= 1936–37 Duke Blue Devils men's basketball team =

American college basketball season

1936–37 Duke Blue Devils men's basketball
- Conference: Southern Conference
- Record: 15–8 (11–6 Southern)
- Head coach: Eddie Cameron
- Home arena: Card Gymnasium

1936–37 Southern Conference men's basketball standings
	Conf.				Overall
Team	W		L	PCT	W		L	PCT
Washington and Lee †	11	–	1	.917	17	–	4	.810
North Carolina	14	–	3	.824	18	–	5	.783
Wake Forest	9	–	4	.692	15	–	6	.714
North Carolina State	14	–	7	.667	15	–	9	.625
Duke	11	–	6	.647	15	–	8	.652
South Carolina	7	–	4	.636	13	–	7	.650
Richmond	5	–	4	.556	13	–	7	.650
Virginia	6	–	7	.462	9	–	10	.474
Furman	3	–	4	.429	8	–	7	.533
Davidson	5	–	8	.385	13	–	10	.565
Maryland	5	–	8	.385	8	–	12	.400
Virginia Tech	4	–	9	.308	6	–	11	.353
VMI	5	–	11	.313	6	–	11	.353
Clemson	2	–	7	.222	6	–	15	.286
The Citadel	0	–	5	.000	7	–	12	.368
William & Mary	0	–	13	.000	0	–	18	.000
† Southern Conference Tournament winner

The 1936–37 Duke Blue Devils men's basketball team represented Duke University during the 1936–37 men's college basketball season. The head coach was Eddie Cameron, coaching his ninth season with the Blue Devils. The team finished with an overall record of 15–8.
