= 1930–31 Georgia Bulldogs basketball team =

American college basketball team season

1930–31 Georgia Bulldogs basketball

SoCon regular season champion
- Conference: Southern Conference
- Record: 23–2 (15–1 SoCon)
- Head coach: Herman Stegeman (12th season)
- Captain: Sandford Sanford
- Home arena: Woodruff Hall

1930–31 Southern Conference men's basketball standings
| | Conf. | | | | Overall |
| Team | W | | L | PCT | W | | L | PCT |
|---|---|---|---|---|---|---|---|---|
| Georgia | 15 | – | 1 | .938 | 23 | – | 2 | .920 |
| Maryland † | 8 | – | 1 | .889 | 18 | – | 4 | .818 |
| Alabama | 11 | – | 2 | .846 | 14 | – | 6 | .700 |
| Kentucky | 8 | – | 2 | .800 | 15 | – | 3 | .833 |
| Auburn | 7 | – | 4 | .636 | 8 | – | 6 | .571 |
| Washington and Lee | 4 | – | 3 | .571 | 11 | – | 7 | .611 |
| Duke | 5 | – | 4 | .556 | 14 | – | 7 | .667 |
| Georgia Tech | 8 | – | 7 | .533 | 11 | – | 13 | .458 |
| Vanderbilt | 7 | – | 7 | .500 | 16 | – | 8 | .667 |
| North Carolina | 6 | – | 6 | .500 | 15 | – | 9 | .625 |
| NC State | 5 | – | 5 | .500 | 8 | – | 8 | .500 |
| LSU | 4 | – | 4 | .500 | 7 | – | 8 | .467 |
| Virginia | 5 | – | 6 | .455 | 11 | – | 9 | .550 |
| Florida | 5 | – | 7 | .417 | 10 | – | 9 | .526 |
| Clemson | 3 | – | 5 | .375 | 6 | – | 7 | .462 |
| Sewanee | 3 | – | 5 | .375 | 5 | – | 9 | .357 |
| Tennessee | 4 | – | 8 | .333 | 11 | – | 10 | .524 |
| Ole Miss | 2 | – | 4 | .333 | 6 | – | 9 | .400 |
| Virginia Tech | 3 | – | 7 | .300 | 5 | – | 10 | .333 |
| VMI | 2 | – | 8 | .200 | 4 | – | 12 | .250 |
| Tulane | 2 | – | 10 | .167 | 6 | – | 14 | .300 |
| South Carolina | 1 | – | 12 | .077 | 1 | – | 17 | .056 |
† Southern Conference Tournament winner

The 1930–31 Georgia Bulldogs basketball team represented the University of Georgia as a member of the Southern Conference (SoCon) during the 1930–31 NCAA men's basketball season. Led by Herman Stegeman in his 12th and final season as head coach, the Bulldogs compiled an overall record of 23–2 with a mark of 15–1 in conference play, winning the SoCon regular season title. The team captain was Sandford Sanford.

== Roster ==
1930–31 Georgia Bulldogs men's basketball team
Players
Coaches

| Pos. | # | Name | Height | Weight | Year | Previous school | Hometown |
|---|---|---|---|---|---|---|---|
| | | Sandford Sanford | — | — |
| | | Tommy Moran | — | — |
| | | Frank Terrell | — | — |
| | | Bill Strickland | — | — |
| | | Vernon Smith | — | — |
| | | Leroy Young | — | — |
| | | Tommy Reeder | — | — |

Head coach

Herman Stegeman

Assistant coach(es)

Legend

- (C) Team captain
- (S) Suspended
- (I) Ineligible
- (W) Walk-on
- Injured
- Current redshirt

== Schedule ==
| Date time, TV | Opponent | Result | Record | Site city, state |
|---|---|---|---|---|
| 12/13/1930 | Alpha S.S. Class | | | |
| 12/20/1930 | Atlanta J.C.C. | | | |
| 12/22/1930 | New Holland A.C. | | | |
| 12/24/1930 | Gulf Refining Co. | | | |
| 12/25/1930 | Atlanta YMCA | | | |
| 1/3/1931 | South Carolina | W 31-16 | 6–0 | |
| 1/9/1931 | at Florida | W 32-29 | 7–0 | |
| 1/11/1931 | at Florida | W 47-29 | 8–0 | |
| 1/13/1931 | N.C. State | W 26-20 | 9–0 | |
| 1/16/1931 | Tennessee | W 22-19 | 10–0 | |
| 1/17/1931 | Ga. Tech | W 39-30 | 11–0 | |
| 1/20/1931 | Clemson | W 34-25 | 12–0 | |
| 1/23/1931 | Auburn | W 30-27 | 13–0 | |
| 1/31/1931 | at Ga. Tech | L 19-37 | 13–1 | |
| 2/3/1931 | at Clemson | W 31-21 | 14–1 | |
| 2/4/1931 | at South Carolina | W 27-21 | 15–1 | |
| 2/6/1931 | Florida | W 38-23 | 16–1 | |
| 2/7/1931 | Florida | W 33-32 | 17–1 | |
| 2/13/1931 | Kentucky | W 25-16 | 18–1 | |
| 2/14/1931 | Ga. Tech | W 44-15 | 19–1 | |
| 2/20/1931 | at Tennessee | W 31-18 | 20–1 | |
| 2/21/1931 | A.A.C. | W 40-29 | 21–1 | |
| 2/27/1931 | Washington & Lee | W 32-31 | 22–1 | |
| 2/28/1931 | Auburn | W 31-27 | 23–1 | |
| 3/1/1931 | Maryland | L 25-26 | 23–2 | |
*Non-conference game. (#) Tournament seedings in parentheses.
