= 1937 Southern Conference men's basketball tournament =

U.S. collegiate basketball event

- Classification: Division I
- Teams: 8
- Site: Thompson Gym; Raleigh, NC
- Champions: Washington and Lee (2nd title)
- Winning coach: Harry Young (2nd title)

1936–37 Southern Conference men's basketball standings
	Conf.				Overall
Team	W		L	PCT	W		L	PCT
Washington and Lee †	11	–	1	.917	17	–	4	.810
North Carolina	14	–	3	.824	18	–	5	.783
Wake Forest	9	–	4	.692	15	–	6	.714
North Carolina State	14	–	7	.667	15	–	9	.625
Duke	11	–	6	.647	15	–	8	.652
South Carolina	7	–	4	.636	13	–	7	.650
Richmond	5	–	4	.556	13	–	7	.650
Virginia	6	–	7	.462	9	–	10	.474
Furman	3	–	4	.429	8	–	7	.533
Davidson	5	–	8	.385	13	–	10	.565
Maryland	5	–	8	.385	8	–	12	.400
Virginia Tech	4	–	9	.308	6	–	11	.353
VMI	5	–	11	.313	6	–	11	.353
Clemson	2	–	7	.222	6	–	15	.286
The Citadel	0	–	5	.000	7	–	12	.368
William & Mary	0	–	13	.000	0	–	18	.000
† Southern Conference Tournament winner

The 1937 Southern Conference men's basketball tournament took place from March 4–6, 1937 at Thompson Gym in Raleigh, North Carolina. The Washington and Lee Generals won their second Southern Conference title, led by head coach Harry Young.

== Format ==
The top eight finishers of the conference's sixteen members were eligible for the tournament. Teams were seeded based on conference winning percentage. The tournament used a preset bracket consisting of three rounds.

== Bracket ==
Quarterfinals; March 4
Washington and Lee	42
South Carolina	22
NC State	42
Maryland	35
Wake Forest	33
Richmond	24
North Carolina	34
Duke	30

Semifinals; March 5
Washington and Lee	27
NC State	23
Wake Forest	35
North Carolina	37

Finals; March 6
Washington and Lee	44
North Carolina	33

* Overtime game

== See also ==
- List of Southern Conference men's basketball champions
