= 1934 Southern Conference men's basketball tournament =

- Classification: Division I
- Teams: 8
- Site: Thompson Gym; Raleigh, NC
- Champions: Washington & Lee (1st title)
- Winning coach: Harry Young (1st title)

1933–34 Southern Conference men's basketball standings
| | Conf. | | | | Overall |
| Team | W | | L | PCT | W | | L | PCT |
|---|---|---|---|---|---|---|---|---|
| South Carolina | 6 | – | 0 | 1.000 | 18 | – | 1 | .947 |
| North Carolina | 12 | – | 2 | .857 | 18 | – | 4 | .818 |
| Maryland | 6 | – | 1 | .857 | 11 | – | 8 | .579 |
| Duke | 9 | – | 4 | .692 | 18 | – | 6 | .750 |
| North Carolina State | 6 | – | 5 | .545 | 11 | – | 6 | .647 |
| Washington and Lee † | 4 | – | 5 | .444 | 10 | – | 6 | .625 |
| VMI | 3 | – | 6 | .333 | 4 | – | 9 | .308 |
| Virginia | 1 | – | 9 | .100 | 7 | – | 11 | .389 |
| Virginia Tech | 1 | – | 10 | .091 | 1 | – | 15 | .063 |
| Clemson | 0 | – | 6 | .000 | 7 | – | 12 | .368 |
† Southern Conference Tournament winner

The 1934 Southern Conference men's basketball tournament took place from March 1–3, 1934 at Thompson Gym in Raleigh, North Carolina. The Washington & Lee Generals won their first Southern Conference title, led by head coach Harry "Cy" Young.

== Format ==
The top eight finishers of the conference's ten members were eligible for the tournament. Teams were seeded based on conference winning percentage. The tournament used a preset bracket consisting of three rounds.

== Bracket ==
Quarterfinals; March 1
Washington & Lee | 45
Maryland | 37
NC State | 43
South Carolina | 24
North Carolina | 27
Virginia | 18
Duke | 35
VMI | 14

Semifinals; March 2
Washington & Lee | 32
NC State | 28
Duke | 21
North Carolina | 18

Finals; March 3
Washington & Lee | 30
Duke | 29

* Overtime game

== See also ==
- List of Southern Conference men's basketball champions
