= 1937–38 William & Mary Indians men's basketball team =

American college basketball season

1937–38 William & Mary Indians men's basketball
- Conference: Southern Conference
- Record: 2–10 (0–8 Southern)
- Head coach: John Kellison (1st season)
- Home arena: Blow Gymnasium

The 1937–38 William & Mary Indians men's basketball team represented the College of William & Mary in intercollegiate basketball during the 1937–38 season. Under the first year of head coach John Kellison, the team finished the season 2–10, 0–8 in Southern Conference play. This was the second straight season that the Indians' finished winless in the Southern Conference. This was the 33rd season of the collegiate basketball program at William & Mary, whose nickname is now the Tribe. The Indians finished 15th in the conference and did not quality for the 1938 Southern Conference men's basketball tournament in Raleigh, North Carolina.

== Schedule ==
1937–38 Southern Conference men's basketball standings
	Conf.				Overall
Team	W		L	PCT	W		L	PCT
North Carolina	13	–	3	.813	16	–	5	.762
North Carolina State	10	–	3	.769	13	–	6	.684
The Citadel	7	–	3	.700	13	–	5	.722
Clemson	9	–	4	.692	16	–	7	.696
Duke †	9	–	5	.643	15	–	9	.625
Richmond	7	–	4	.636	15	–	5	.750
Maryland	6	–	4	.600	15	–	9	.625
Washington and Lee	6	–	5	.545	12	–	9	.571
Wake Forest	7	–	8	.467	7	–	12	.368
Virginia Tech	4	–	5	.444	6	–	8	.429
Davidson	4	–	11	.267	10	–	12	.455
Furman	2	–	6	.250	6	–	13	.316
VMI	2	–	7	.222	4	–	11	.267
South Carolina	2	–	12	.143	3	–	21	.125
William & Mary	0	–	9	.000	2	–	10	.167
† Southern Conference Tournament winner

Date time, TV	Rank^{#}	Opponent^{#}	Result	Record	Site city, state
Regular season
		at VPI	L 25–29	0–1 (0–1)	War Memorial Gymnasium; Blacksburg, VA
		at Washington and Lee	L 20–42	0–2 (0–2)	Lexington, VA
		at VMI	L 26–29	0–3 (0–3)	Cormack Field House; Lexington, VA
		VPI	L 31–41	0–4 (0–4)	Blow Gymnasium; Williamsburg, VA
*		at Virginia	W 31–27	1–4 (0–4)	Memorial Gymnasium; Charlottesville, VA
2/9/1937*		at Navy	L 20–61	1–5 (0–4)	Annapolis, MD
2/10/1937*		at Maryland	L 38–45	1–6 (0–4)	Ritchie Coliseum; College Park, MD
2/14/1937		at Richmond	L 28–43	1–7 (0–5)	Millhiser Gymnasium; Richmond, VA
*		Virginia	W 41–40	2–7 (0–5)	Blow Gymnasium; Williamsburg, VA
		VMI	L 30–35	2–8 (0–6)	Blow Gymnasium; Williamsburg, VA
		Washington and Lee	L 40–61	2–9 (0–7)	Blow Gymnasium; Williamsburg, VA
2/26/1937		Richmond	L 42–46	2–10 (0–8)	Blow Gymnasium; Williamsburg, VA
*Non-conference game. ^{#}Rankings from AP Poll. (#) Tournament seedings in parentheses.
