= Cap (nickname) =

Cap is the nickname of the following people:

- Charles A. Allen (American politician), Los Angeles City Council, 1940s
- Cap Anson (1852–1922), American Major League Baseball player
- C. E. Barham (1904–1972), Lieutenant Governor of Louisiana, 1952–1956
- Cap Boso (born 1963), American former National Football League player
- Irwin Caplan (1919–2007), American illustrator, painter, designer and cartoonist
- Wilbur Wade Card (1873–1948), American baseball player, coach and athletic director at Duke University
- Forrest Craver (1875–1958), American college football player and coach and athletic director
- Cap Crowell (1892–1962), American Major League Baseball pitcher
- Cap Curtis (1873–1955), American circus superintendent
- Cap Dierks (1932–2021), American politician
- Cap Edwards (1888–?), National Football League coach and player
- Cap Fear (1901–1978), Canadian Football League player
- Ernest R. Graham (politician) (1886–1957), American politician
- Walthall Robertson Joyner (1854–1925), mayor of Atlanta, Georgia
- Austin E. Lathrop (1865–1950), American industrialist and outspoken opponent of Alaskan statehood
- Bill Narleski (1900–1964), American Major League Baseball player
- John Oehler (1910–1983), American National Football League player
- Cap Peterson (1942–1980), American Major League Baseball player
- Cap Raeder (born 1953), American former World Hockey Association goaltender and National Hockey League coach
- Joseph Shaw (editor) (1874–1952), American magazine editor and fencer
- George Streeter (1837–1921), American crook
- Andrew Tilles (1865–1951), American business magnate and philanthropist
- Cap Timm (1908–1987), longest-tenured college baseball coach for the Iowa State University Cyclones
- Caspar Weinberger (1917–2006), American politician and businessman, Secretary of Defense under President Reagan
- Clarence W. Wigington (1883–1967), African-American architect
- Carl S. Williams (1872–1960), American football player and coach
- Marsh Williams (1893–1935), American Major League Baseball pitcher in 1916

== See also ==
- Cappy (disambiguation)
- Sarge (nickname)
