= Joe Davis (basketball, born 1902) =

American athletics coach (1902–1990)

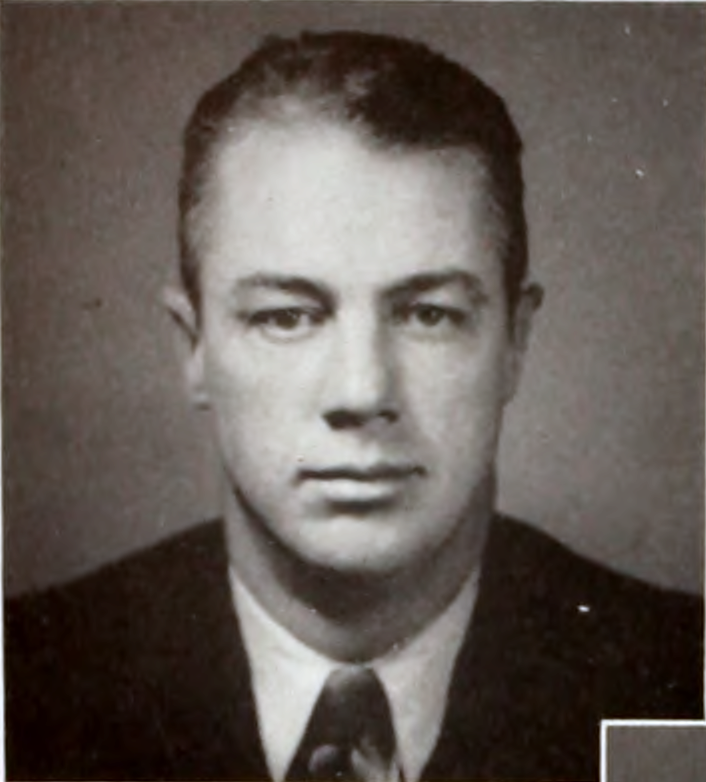
- Davis in 1940

Biographical details
- Born: January 30, 1902; Smyrna, Tennessee, U.S.
- Died: January 5, 1990 (aged 87); Sugar Land, Texas, U.S.

Playing career

Football/Basketball/Baseball
- 1924–1928: Southwestern (TN)
- Position: End (football)

Coaching career (HC unless noted)

Basketball
- 1931–1940: Clemson
- 1942–1949: Rice

Football
- 1931–1939: Clemson (assistant)
- 1940–1967: Rice (assistant)

Head coaching record
- Overall: 184–142

Accomplishments and honors

Championships
- 1 SoCon (1938–39); 4 SWC (1942-43, 1943-44, 1944-45, 1948-49)

Joseph Wallace Davis III (January 30, 1902 – January 5, 1990) was an American college basketball and football coach at Clemson and Rice.

Born in Smyrna, Tennessee, Davis played football, basketball, and baseball at Southwestern Presbyterian in Memphis, Tennessee, playing football for coach Jess Neely. After two years in business and coaching high school football in Mississippi, Davis joined Neely's staff at Clemson, and was also named head basketball coach. Davis left Clemson as the school's winningest basketball coach, including winning the 1939 Southern Conference tournament with star center Banks McFadden.

In 1940 he and Neely moved to Rice University, where the two would coach together for 27 more years. Davis took over as the Owls' head basketball coach in 1942, and won three consecutive Southwest Conference regular season championships, and a fourth in 1948–49, his last as basketball coach. Davis retired from football coaching after the 1967 season. He was inducted into the Rice Athletics Hall of Fame in 1973.
