= 1935 Southern Conference men's basketball tournament =

- Classification: Division I
- Teams: 8
- Site: Thompson Gym; Raleigh, NC
- Champions: North Carolina (5th title)
- Winning coach: Bo Shepard (1st title)

1934–35 Southern Conference men's basketball standings
	Conf.				Overall
Team	W		L	PCT	W		L	PCT
North Carolina †	12	–	1	.923	23	–	2	.920
Clemson	3	–	1	.750	15	–	3	.833
Duke	10	–	4	.714	18	–	8	.692
Virginia	7	–	5	.583	13	–	9	.591
Maryland	4	–	3	.571	8	–	10	.444
North Carolina State	6	–	5	.545	10	–	9	.526
South Carolina	5	–	7	.417	15	–	9	.625
Washington and Lee	4	–	8	.333	10	–	10	.500
VMI	2	–	9	.182	3	–	14	.176
Virginia Tech	1	–	11	.083	3	–	16	.158
† Southern Conference Tournament winner

The 1935 Southern Conference men's basketball tournament took place from February 28–March 2, 1935, at Thompson Gym in Raleigh, North Carolina. The North Carolina Tar Heels won their fifth Southern Conference title, led by head coach Bo Shepard.

== Format ==
The top eight finishers of the conference's ten members were eligible for the tournament. Teams were seeded based on conference winning percentage. The tournament used a preset bracket consisting of three rounds.

== Bracket ==
Quarterfinals; February 28
North Carolina	46
South Carolina	25
NC State	42
VMI	30
Duke	39
Virginia	32
Washington and Lee	29
Clemson	25

Semifinals; March 1
North Carolina	30
NC State	28
Washington and Lee	31
Duke	27

Finals; March 2
North Carolina	35
Washington and Lee	27

* Overtime game

== See also ==
- List of Southern Conference men's basketball champions
