= 1930–31 Duke Blue Devils men's basketball team =

American college basketball season

1930–31 Duke Blue Devils men's basketball
- Conference: Southern Conference
- Record: 14–7 (5–4 Southern)
- Head coach: Eddie Cameron
- Home arena: Card Gymnasium

1930–31 Southern Conference men's basketball standings
	Conf.				Overall
Team	W		L	PCT	W		L	PCT
Georgia	15	–	1	.938	23	–	2	.920
Maryland †	8	–	1	.889	18	–	4	.818
Alabama	11	–	2	.846	14	–	6	.700
Kentucky	8	–	2	.800	15	–	3	.833
Auburn	7	–	4	.636	8	–	6	.571
Washington and Lee	4	–	3	.571	11	–	7	.611
Duke	5	–	4	.556	14	–	7	.667
Georgia Tech	8	–	7	.533	11	–	13	.458
Vanderbilt	7	–	7	.500	16	–	8	.667
North Carolina	6	–	6	.500	15	–	9	.625
North Carolina State	5	–	5	.500	8	–	8	.500
LSU	4	–	4	.500	7	–	8	.467
Virginia	5	–	6	.455	11	–	9	.550
Florida	5	–	7	.417	10	–	9	.526
Clemson	3	–	5	.375	6	–	7	.462
Sewanee	3	–	5	.375	5	–	9	.357
Tennessee	4	–	8	.333	11	–	10	.524
Ole Miss	2	–	4	.333	6	–	9	.400
Virginia Tech	3	–	7	.300	5	–	10	.333
VMI	2	–	8	.200	4	–	12	.250
Tulane	2	–	10	.167	6	–	14	.300
South Carolina	1	–	12	.077	1	–	17	.056
† Southern Conference Tournament winner

The 1930–31 Duke Blue Devils men's basketball team represented Duke University during the 1930–31 men's college basketball season. The head coach was Eddie Cameron, coaching his third season with the Blue Devils. The team finished with an overall record of 14–7.
