= 1931 Southern Conference men's basketball tournament =

- Classification: Division I
- Teams: 16
- Site: Municipal Auditorium; Atlanta, GA
- Champions: Maryland (1st title)
- Winning coach: Burton Shipley (1st title)
- MVP: Louis Berger (Maryland)

1930–31 Southern Conference men's basketball standings
	Conf.				Overall
Team	W		L	PCT	W		L	PCT
Georgia	15	–	1	.938	23	–	2	.920
Maryland †	8	–	1	.889	18	–	4	.818
Alabama	11	–	2	.846	14	–	6	.700
Kentucky	8	–	2	.800	15	–	3	.833
Auburn	7	–	4	.636	8	–	6	.571
Washington and Lee	4	–	3	.571	11	–	7	.611
Duke	5	–	4	.556	14	–	7	.667
Georgia Tech	8	–	7	.533	11	–	13	.458
Vanderbilt	7	–	7	.500	16	–	8	.667
North Carolina	6	–	6	.500	15	–	9	.625
NC State	5	–	5	.500	8	–	8	.500
LSU	4	–	4	.500	7	–	8	.467
Virginia	5	–	6	.455	11	–	9	.550
Florida	5	–	7	.417	10	–	9	.526
Clemson	3	–	5	.375	6	–	7	.462
Sewanee	3	–	5	.375	5	–	9	.357
Tennessee	4	–	8	.333	11	–	10	.524
Ole Miss	2	–	4	.333	6	–	9	.400
Virginia Tech	3	–	7	.300	5	–	10	.333
VMI	2	–	8	.200	4	–	12	.250
Tulane	2	–	10	.167	6	–	14	.300
South Carolina	1	–	12	.077	1	–	17	.056
† Southern Conference Tournament winner

The 1931 Southern Conference men's basketball tournament took place from February 27–March 3, 1931, at Municipal Auditorium in Atlanta, Georgia. The Maryland Terrapins won their first Southern Conference title, led by head coach Burton Shipley.

== Bracket ==
First round February 27
North Carolina	23
Vanderbilt	21
Maryland	37
LSU	33
Auburn	33
Virginia	26
Georgia	32
Washington & Lee	31
Duke	31
Clemson	27
Kentucky	33
NC State	28
Tennessee	26
Alabama	20
Florida	53
Georgia Tech	48

Quarterfinals; February 28
North Carolina	17
Maryland	19
Georgia	31
Auburn	27
Duke	30
Kentucky	35
Florida	33
Tennessee	29

Semifinals; March 2
Maryland	26
Georgia	25
Kentucky	56
Florida	35

Finals; March 3
Maryland	29
Kentucky	27

* Overtime game

=== Championship ===
March 3

Maryland 29, Kentucky 27
Pts: Louis Berger 12	Pts: Jake Bronston 14

Municipal Auditorium, Atlanta, Georgia

== All-Southern tournament team ==
Player	Position	Class	Team
Louis Berger	G	Junior	Maryland
Edward Ronkin	G	Senior	Maryland
Louis McGinnis	F	Senior	Kentucky
Carey Spicer	F	Senior	Kentucky
George Yates	C	Junior	Kentucky

== See also ==
- List of Southern Conference men's basketball champions
