= Cappy =

Cappy may refer to:

== Places ==
- Cappy, Somme, a commune of the Somme département, France
- Cappy, a townland in County Fermanagh, Northern Ireland

== People ==
- Ralph Cappy (1943–2009), Chief Justice of the Supreme Court of Pennsylvania
- Cappy Thompson (born 1952), American artist in the medium of glass
- nickname of Fred Capossela (1902–1991), American thoroughbred race track announcer
- nickname of Franklin Cappon (1900–1961), American college football and basketball player and coach
- nickname of Cara Capuano, American sports reporter and television sports anchor
- nickname of Catharine Bond Hill, American economics professor and current president of Vassar College
- nickname of W. H. Lillard (1881–1967), American football coach and educator

== Characters ==
- Cappy (Robots), a character in the 2005 film Robots
- Cappy (Kirby), a type of monster in the Kirby franchise
- Cappy, in the anime series Hamtaro
- Cappy, a minor character in the TV series Twin Peaks — see List of Twin Peaks characters
- Cappy, a hat character in the 2017 video game Super Mario Odyssey

== Other uses ==
- Cappy (juice), a brand of juices produced and commercialized by the Coca-Cola Company in Eastern Europe

== See also ==
- Cappie (disambiguation)
- Cap (nickname)
