= Sarge (nickname) =

Sarge is the nickname of:

- Paul Chambers (footballer) (born 1982), Australian rules footballer
- Norris Coleman (born 1961), American retired basketball player nicknamed "The Sarge"
- Sarge Ferris (1928–1989), American poker player
- Gary Matthews (born 1950), former Major League Baseball player and coach, and current Phillies broadcaster
- Brad McCrimmon (1959–2011), Canadian National Hockey League player and coach
- Orville Moody (1933–2008), American golfer
- Charles Rangel (born 1930), American politician, lawyer and Korean War soldier
- Mitchell Sargent (born 1979), Australian former rugby league footballer
- Lewis Sargentich, professor at Harvard Law School
- Tony Schumacher (drag racer) (born 1969), American drag racer

== See also ==
- Gabby Street (1882–1951), American catcher, manager, coach, and radio broadcaster in Major League Baseball nicknamed "The Old Sarge"
- Hoyt Wilhelm (1922–2002), American Major League Baseball pitcher nicknamed "Ol' Sarge"
- Cap (nickname)
