= Cappie =

Cappie may refer to:

- Cappie Pondexter (born 1983), American professional basketball player in the WNBA
- Cappie (Captain John Paul Jones), a character from the TV series Greek played by Scott Michael Foster
- Cappie the Witch, the younger sister of Hattie the Witch in Wallykazam!
- Cappie Roew, a character in the film Lucas played by Charlie Sheen
- Critics and Awards Program for High School Students, also known as the Cappies, an international program for recognizing, celebrating, and providing learning experiences for high school theater and journalism students and teenage playwrights
- A capitalist, somebody who believes in the economic system of capitalism

== See also ==
- Cappy (disambiguation)
