= 1939 Southern Conference men's basketball tournament =

- Classification: Division I
- Teams: 11
- Site: Thompson Gym; Raleigh, NC
- Champions: Clemson (1st title)
- Winning coach: Joe Davis (1st title)

1938–39 Southern Conference men's basketball standings
	Conf.				Overall
Team	W		L	PCT	W		L	PCT
Wake Forest	15	–	3	.833	18	–	6	.750
Maryland	8	–	3	.727	15	–	9	.625
Washington and Lee	8	–	3	.727	13	–	9	.591
The Citadel	7	–	3	.700	14	–	5	.737
Davidson	9	–	7	.563	19	–	10	.655
North Carolina	8	–	7	.533	10	–	11	.476
North Carolina State	7	–	6	.538	10	–	7	.588
Duke	8	–	8	.500	10	–	12	.455
Clemson †	6	–	6	.500	16	–	8	.667
VMI	6	–	6	.500	7	–	10	.412
Richmond	5	–	5	.500	10	–	10	.500
William & Mary	4	–	9	.308	9	–	12	.429
South Carolina	2	–	8	.200	5	–	18	.217
Virginia Tech	2	–	10	.167	3	–	14	.176
Furman	0	–	10	.000	6	–	16	.273
† Southern Conference Tournament winner

The 1939 Southern Conference men's basketball tournament took place from March 1–4, 1939 at Thompson Gym in Raleigh, North Carolina. The Clemson Tigers won their first Southern Conference title, led by head coach Joe Davis.

== Format ==
The top eight finishers of the conference's fifteen members were eligible for the tournament. Teams were seeded based on conference winning percentage. The tournament used a preset bracket consisting of three rounds.

== Bracket ==
First round March 1
Clemson	44
North Carolina	43
Richmond	31
VMI	20
NC State	40
Duke	39

Quarterfinals; March 2
Wake Forest	28
Clemson	30
Davidson	43
Washington and Lee	32
Maryland	47
Richmond	32
The Citadel	38
NC State	40

Semifinals; March 3
Clemson	49
Davidson	33
Maryland	53
NC State	29

Finals; March 4
Clemson	39
Maryland	27

* Overtime game

== See also ==
- List of Southern Conference men's basketball champions
