= Wilbur Wade Card =

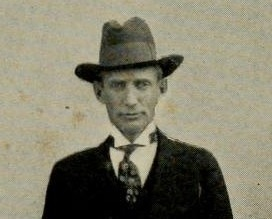
- Card in 1922

Biographical details
- Born: October 29, 1873; Franklinton, North Carolina, U.S.
- Died: September 3, 1948 (aged 74); Durham, North Carolina, U.S.
- Education: Trinity (NC); Harvard

Coaching career (HC unless noted)
- 1905–1912: Duke

Administrative career (AD unless noted)
- 1902–1948: Duke

Head coaching record
- Overall: 30–17 (.638)

Wilbur Wade "Cap" Card (October 29, 1873 – September 3, 1948) was an American baseball player, coach and athletic director at Duke University. He initially introduced college basketball to the state of North Carolina and became the university's first men's coach of that program from 1906 to 1912 as well as being Duke's first athletic director from 1902 to 1948.

Card was born in Franklinton, North Carolina on October 29, 1873, to Sabert Henry Card and Cecilia Bennett Fuller. He attended Trinity College in Durham in 1895, becoming one of the school's best athletes as an outfielder and batter, breaking a number of baseball records and eventually earning his nickname "Cap." Card was team captain in 1899. He graduated from college the following year.

In 1900, Card entered the School of Physical Education at Harvard University and later trained and worked at the Sargent Normal School every summer through 1913. After graduating from Harvard in 1901, Card worked as director at the YMCA in Mobile, Alabama. In 1902, he was invited by President John Carlisle Kilgo to return to Trinity College and become director of the new physical education program there.

Card served as athletic director at Trinity College (later named Duke University in 1924) through the rest of his life. He also was a sports coach, including baseball and basketball, at the school through 1912. Card was first to introduce college basketball in North Carolina after being asked by coach Richard Crozier of Wake Forest College (now Wake Forest University) in 1905 about playing a game. After recruiting a makeshift team and setting the gym up for basketball, he coached Trinity College during its inaugural game played in Durham verus Wake Forest in 1906, but lost 24–10. From doing this, he was soon known as the "Father of Intercollegiate Basketball in North Carolina." Card would finish in 1912 with a 30–17 lifetime record as Duke University's first men's basketball coach.

On September 3, 1948, Card died from a heart attack at age 74. He is buried at Maplewood Cemetery in Durham. In his honor, the gymnasium at Duke University was renamed Card Gymnasium in March 1958. The gym, which opened in 1930, is located adjacent to the famous Cameron Indoor Stadium.

== Head coaching record ==
Record table
Season	Team	Overall	Conference	Standing	Postseason
Duke Blue Devils (No Conference) (1905–1912)
1905–06	Duke	2–3	—	—	—
1906–07	Duke	4–2	—	—	—
1907–08	Duke	2–3	—	—	—
1908–09	Duke	8–1	—	—	—
1909–10	Duke	4–4	—	—	—
1910–11	Duke	4–3	—	—	—
1911–12	Duke	6–1	—	—	—
Duke:		30–17			
Total:		30–17			
National champion Postseason invitational champion Conference regular season champion Conference regular season and conference tournament champion Division regular season champion Division regular season and conference tournament champion Conference tournament champion
