= Alumni Gymnasium (University of Kentucky) =

Building at the University of Kentucky

Coordinates: 38°02′26.40″N 84°30′12.50″W

Alumni Gymnasium, now known as Alumni Gym Fitness Center, is a building on the University of Kentucky (UK) campus in Lexington, Kentucky. It is located on the corner of South Limestone Street and Avenue of Champions (Euclid Avenue) next to the University of Kentucky Student Center. When it opened in 1924, replacing Alumni Hall (now known as Barker Hall and Buell Armory), it was a 2,800 seat multi-purpose arena, serving as home to the UK Wildcats basketball team. It was replaced when Memorial Coliseum opened in 1950. The building later became a student recreation facility, and was frequently used for recreational and intramural basketball. During this period, it was also home to the University of Kentucky Men's Club Basketball team, University of Kentucky Club Dodgeball team, and the UK Men's Club Volleyball team. The interior of the facility was gutted in 2017 as part of a project to renovate the university's student center, and the building reopened in 2018 as a student fitness center.

== History ==
Alumni Gymnasium opened in 1924 in what had been the site of a lake and swamp on the edge of the University of Kentucky campus. The gymnasium cost $92,000 to construct and included seating for 2,800 people, which could accommodate the entire student body with seats left over. The Kentucky Wildcats men's basketball played 271 games at Alumni Gymnasium from 1924 to 1950, going 247–24 (.911). The first game held here was against the University of Cincinnati in which the Wildcats won with a final score of 28–23. The arena has also been home to the University of Kentucky Club Basketball team, University of Kentucky Club Dodgeball team, and the UK Men's Club Volleyball team.

== Renovation and reopening ==
As part of the UK Student Center Renovation and Expansion, Alumni Gym was renovated and now includes spaces for aerobics, strength training, spinning, fitness studios, and men's/women's lockers and showers. During the renovation, the interior was gutted and the roof replaced, but the original exterior shell was maintained. The updated gym consists of two levels of fitness and wellness equipment, with a structure with stadium-like screens at its center. The fitness center was the first available to residents of the university's north campus for several decades; during the last few years before the reopening of Alumni Gym as such, UK had subsidized 500 student memberships at Lexington's downtown YMCA location. In its new role, it relieved stress on the university's only previous student fitness facility, the Johnson Center on the south campus.

== Arena high statistics ==
The following are record high statistics for Alumni Gymnasium.

Category	#	UK player	#	Opp player	#	UK game opponent	#	Opp game opponent
Points	40	Bill Spivey (2/18/1950)	32	Jim Nolan (2/21/1948)	98	Western Ontario (1/3/1948)	66	Vanderbilt (2/25/1950)
Free Throws	14	Alex Groza (2/21/1949)	9	Tony Karpowich (1/31/1944)	25	Georgia (2/21/1949)	23	Alabama (2/6/1943)
Field Goals	16	Bill Spivey (2/18/1950)	12	Jim Nolan (2/21/1948)	44	Western Ontario (1/31/1948)	24	Vanderbilt (2/25/1950)
