= Gore Gymnasium =

Gymnasium in Wake Forest, North Carolina

- Location: 199 N. Wingate St. Wake Forest, NC 27587
- Owner: Southeastern Baptist Theological Seminary
- Operator: Wake Forest University
- Capacity: n/a
- Surface: Wood

Construction
- Groundbreaking: 1934
- Opened: May, 1935
- Cost: $150,000 (approx.)
- Architect: W.H. Dietrich

Tenants
- Wake Forest Demon Deacons (men's basketball)

Gore Gymnasium was an on-campus gymnasium at Wake Forest College (now University) in Wake Forest, North Carolina. The gym opened in 1935 as the home of the Wake Forest Demon Deacons men's basketball team. The gymnasium served the Deacons for twenty seasons before the entire school moved to Winston-Salem, North Carolina in 1956. It was in this gym that Wake's first two tournament teams, the 1939 Elite Eight squad and the 1953 Sweet Sixteen squad, played their home games. Prior to its construction, the team had played most of its games at Raleigh Memorial Auditorium, because the original gym was too small.

The gym is now known as the Ledford Student Center, the student union of the Southeastern Baptist Theological Seminary, the school which now uses the original Wake campus. The original gymnasium itself is still used for intramural sports, although the seats have been removed.
