= Woodruff Hall =

Multi-purpose arena in Athens, Georgia

Coordinates: 33.952270°N 83.374004°W

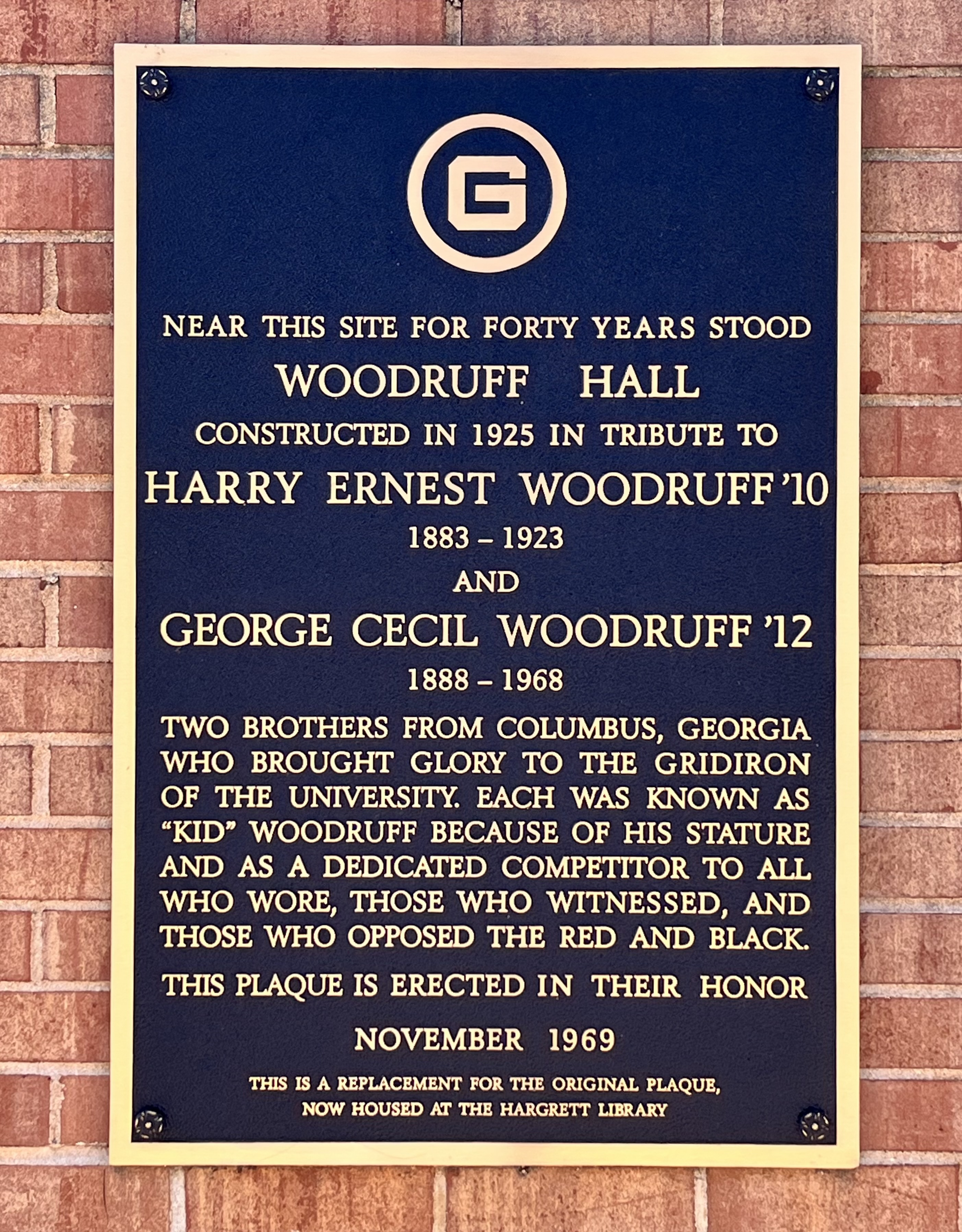
A plaque commemorating Woodruff Hall

Woodruff Hall was a 3,000 seat multi-purpose arena on the University of Georgia campus in Athens, Georgia. It opened in 1923, and was located on North Campus in the area bounded by Baldwin Street, Sanford Drive, and Hooper Street now occupied by the Psychology-Journalism Complex. The building was named for George Cecil Woodruff and his brother Harry, both of whom were football players, with the former becoming coach in the mid-1920s. The building featured a gabled wood roof, many windows, and wrap around bleachers and a balcony. It was home to the University of Georgia Bulldogs' basketball team until it was replaced when Georgia Coliseum opened in 1964. The Hall was one of the buildings that was used for the training of servicemen in the Second World War.

Prior to the building of the gymnasium, the Bulldogs had played in a variety of locations, including the Athens YMCA (now the site of the Georgia Theatre) from 1905 to 1911, the then-partially-completed Memorial Hall from 1911 to 1918, and the off-campus Moss Auditorium from 1919 to 1923.
