= Ritchie Coliseum =

Multipurpose athletics facility and music venue at the University of Maryland

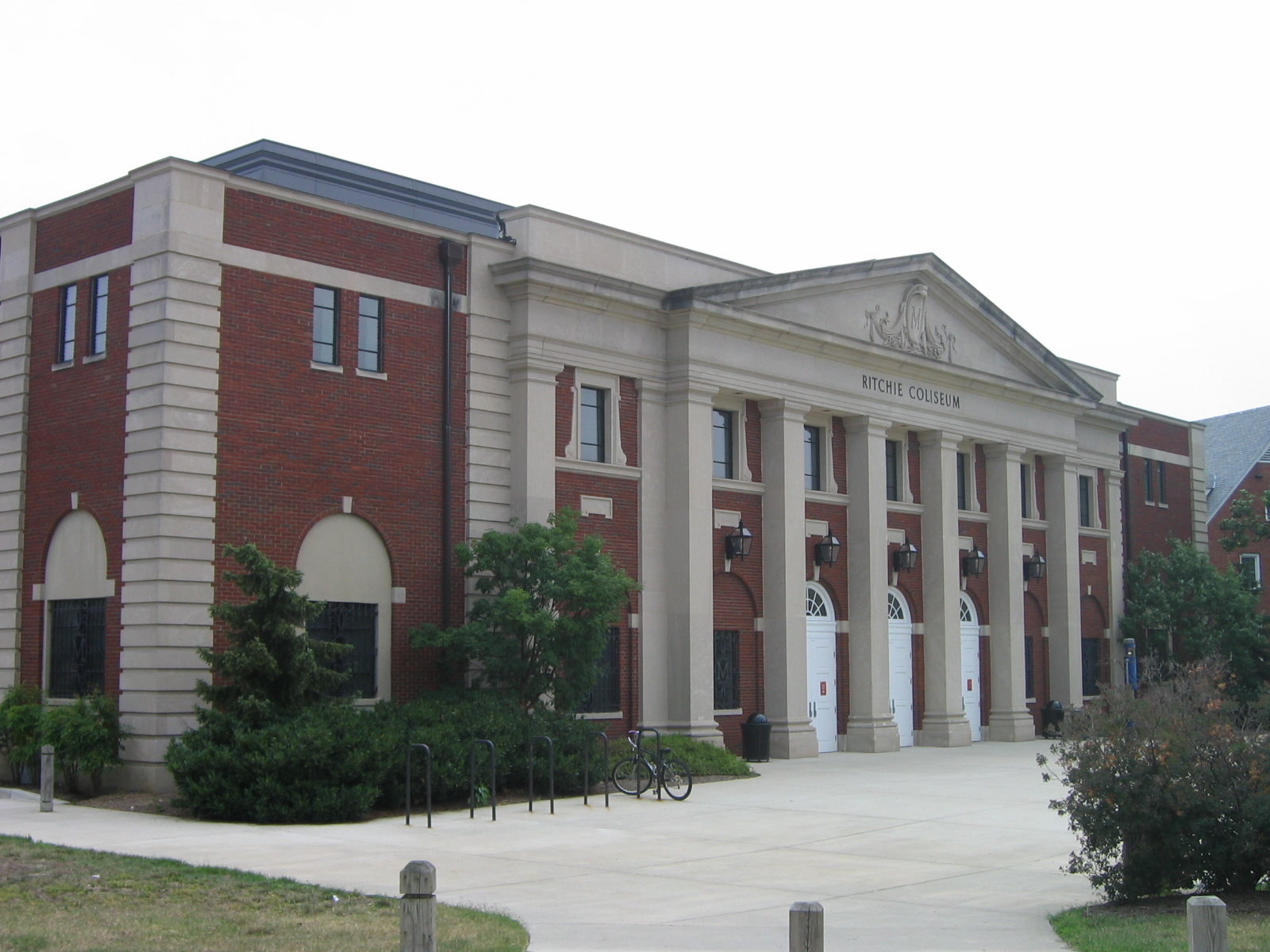
- Interactive map of Ritchie Coliseum
- Location: 7675 Baltimore Avenue; College Park, Maryland 20742
- Coordinates: 38.9850°N 76.9365°W
- Owner: University of Maryland
- Operator: University of Maryland
- Capacity: 1,500
- Surface: Maple hardwood
- Field size: 11,000 ft^{2} (1,021.9 m^{2})

Construction
- Built: 1931
- Opened: 1931
- Renovated: 1997
- Cost: $200,000
- Architect: H. D. Watts Construction Company

Tenants
- Maryland Terrapins (1931–2002); Maryland Terrapins men's basketball (1931–1955)

University of Maryland, College Park campus

Ritchie Coliseum is a multipurpose athletics facility and music venue at the University of Maryland. It served as the home arena for the Maryland Terrapins men's basketball team from 1931 to 1955, and for its gymnastics, wrestling, and volleyball teams until 2002. It is located on the east side of Baltimore Avenue in College Park, Maryland. The official seating capacity is 1,500.

== History ==
Ritchie Coliseum, named after then Maryland governor Albert Cabell Ritchie, was built in 1931, at a cost of $200,000, to replace a facility known as "the Gymnasium" as the home arena for the basketball and boxing teams. The arena was built by the H. D. Watts Construction Company, which was owned by Harry Watts, an alumnus who played as a fullback on the football team from 1901 to 1903. The building hosted the basketball and boxing teams until 1955, when it was replaced by Cole Field House centrally located on the campus.

For 26 years at Ritchie Coliseum, basketball games were held immediately before or after boxing matches. During the 1930s, boxing was the most popular sport at Maryland and bouts often drew crowds of as many as 6,000, far exceeding the facility's capacity. In 1937, Ritchie Coliseum hosted the Southern Conference boxing tournament, which the undefeated Maryland team won. Terrapins pugilists Ben Alperstein and Tom Birmingham went on to compete in the national intercollegiate championship in Sacramento, California.

After he took over in 1950, basketball coach Bud Millikan said the boxing doubleheader events were indicative of the sad state of Maryland athletics, and put an end to them early in his tenure. He also complained the facility had no ball racks, with basketballs stored in duct-taped cardboard boxes instead, and that the team had played in high school arenas that were more adequate than Ritchie Coliseum.

When Maryland joined the Atlantic Coast Conference in 1953, basketball games routinely attracted capacity crowds to Ritchie Coliseum. Newspapers quoted football coach Jim Tatum as saying basketball games were always sold out and it was impossible to get tickets. Millikan later said that this was the only thing Tatum ever did to anger him. Millikan said that he told Tatum, "I thought we should be getting students standing in line from Baltimore to D.C., trying to get into the damn games. Please don't tell people the games are sold out."

In 1972, Title IX was enacted and the women's basketball team was formed. With a requirement for equal facilities, the university offered to make Ritchie Coliseum a dedicated arena for the women. Head coach Chris Weller rejected this, wanting instead to use the same facility as the men's team, Cole Field House.

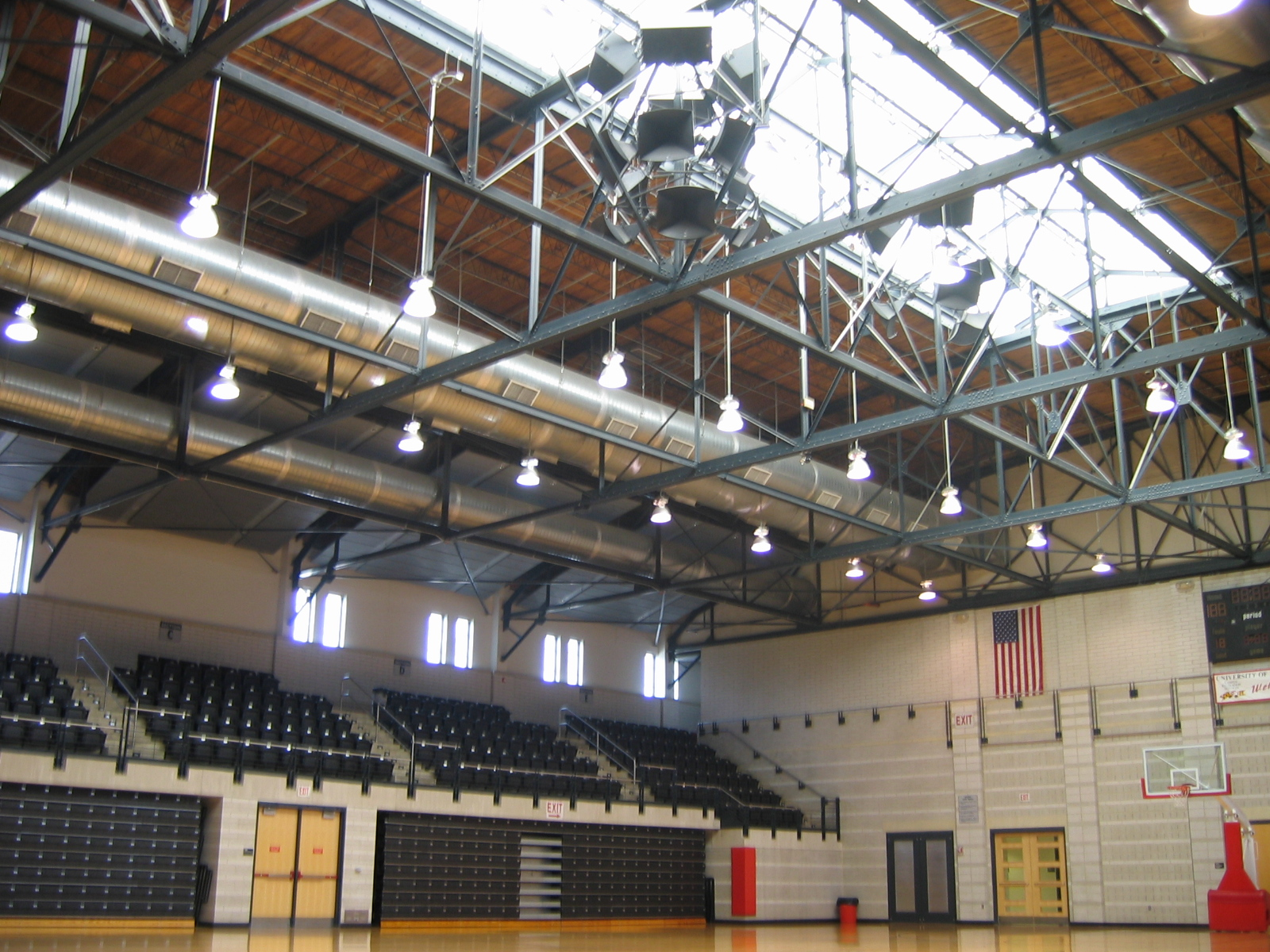
The interior of Ritchie Coliseum in 2007.

The building was renovated in the spring of 1997 and is used as a multipurpose facility. It served as the home arena of the Maryland Terrapins gymnastics, wrestling, and volleyball teams until the completion of the Comcast Center in 2002. Those athletics teams temporarily returned to Ritchie when a water main burst in 2004. The facility is also the host site of the Maryland state high school volleyball championships.

Music Venue

Ritchie Coliseum has also been used as a music venue as long ago as 1956 and holds the Annual College Park Free Blues Festival (11th CPBF is Saturday, November 10, 2018). Duke Ellington performed in 1956, in a Jazz vs. Classics Pop Concert. As reported by The Diamondback, the cost to students to witness this historic concert was only $1 (that's just $8.72 today with inflation). The industrial band Skinny Puppy also played there in 1990.

== Description ==
The floor dimensions are 11,000 ft^{2} (1,021.9 m^{2}) with a surface of maple hardwood. The official seating capacity used to be 1,500. There are 1,900 total seats, which includes 600 folding seat-back chairs in the upper mezzanine, 700 pull-out bench seats, and 600 chairs on the floor. Other features are concessions stands on two levels, a ticket booth, and scoreboard. Additional facilities consist of a weight room with free weights and cardiovascular equipment, and a martial arts room with padded walls and mats.
