= Eddie Cameron =

American football and basketball player, coach, college athletics administrator

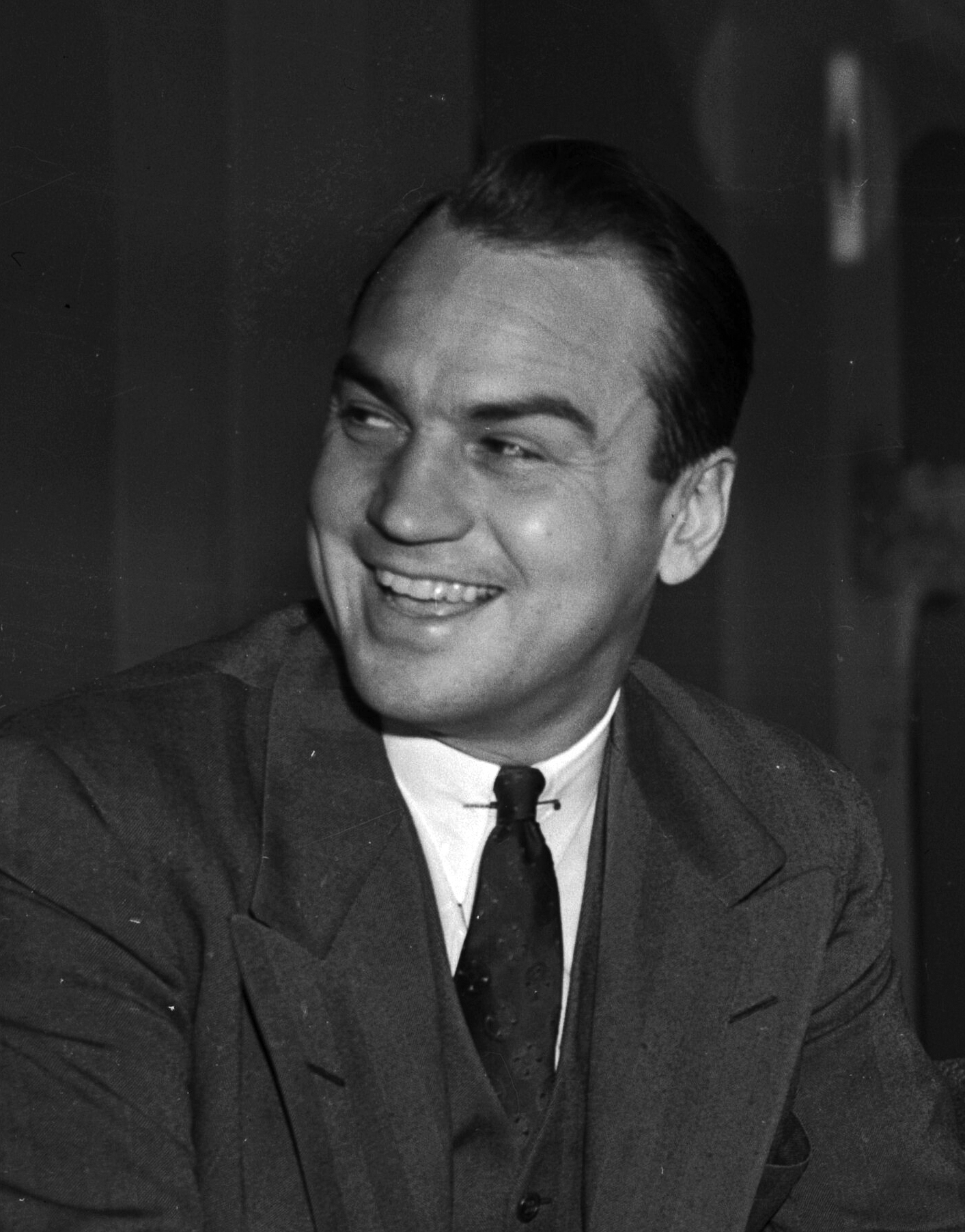
- Cameron in 1938

Biographical details
- Born: April 22, 1902; Pittsburgh, Pennsylvania, U.S.
- Died: November 25, 1988 (aged 86); Durham, North Carolina, U.S.

Playing career

Football
- 1923: Washington and Lee
- Position: Fullback

Coaching career (HC unless noted)

Football
- 1926–1941: Duke (assistant)
- 1942–1945: Duke

Basketball
- 1924–1925: Washington and Lee
- 1928–1942: Duke

Administrative career (AD unless noted)
- 1951–1972: Duke

Head coaching record
- Overall: 25–11–1 (football); 234–104 (basketball)
- Bowls: 1–0

Accomplishments and honors

Championships
- Football; 3 SoCon (1943–1945) Basketball; 3 SoCon (1938, 1941–1942)
- College Football Hall of Fame; Inducted in 1976 (profile)

Edmund McCullough Cameron (April 22, 1902 – November 25, 1988) was an American football and basketball player, coach, and college athletics administrator. He served as the head basketball coach at Washington and Lee University for one season in 1924–25 and at Duke University from 1928 to 1942, compiling a career college basketball record of 234–104. Cameron was also the head football coach at Duke University from 1942 to 1945, tallying a mark of 25–11–1, and the athletic director at the school from 1951 to 1972. Cameron was part of Duke athletics from 1926 to 1972, the second longest tenure in the school's history. Duke's home basketball arena was renamed as Cameron Indoor Stadium in his honor in 1972.

== Early life and playing career ==
Cameron attended Culver Military Academy in Culver, Indiana, before becoming a fullback at Washington and Lee University in Virginia. At Washington and Lee, he was captain of both the basketball and football teams, and tied for the national scoring title in football.

== Coaching career ==
When Washington and Lee coach Jimmy DeHart was hired by Duke, Cameron followed him to coach the freshman team. After Wallace Wade was lured away from University of Alabama by Duke, school administrators urged him to retain Cameron. Cameron eventually became the backfield coach, scout, and recruiter for Wade. In 1929, he got the additional responsibility of head basketball coach, a position he kept until 1949.

Cameron's first two Duke basketball teams made the Southern Conference tournament finals even as a new team in the league. Cameron's teams had a 226–99 record (.695), 119–56 (.680) in conference play, during his 14 years as head coach, which included conference championships in 1938, 1941 and 1942. During his tenure, in 1940, Duke built the largest basketball arena south of the Palestra in Philadelphia, Pennsylvania. Cameron coached the first game, a 36–27 victory over Princeton University, on January 6, 1940. That arena would eventually come to bear his name.

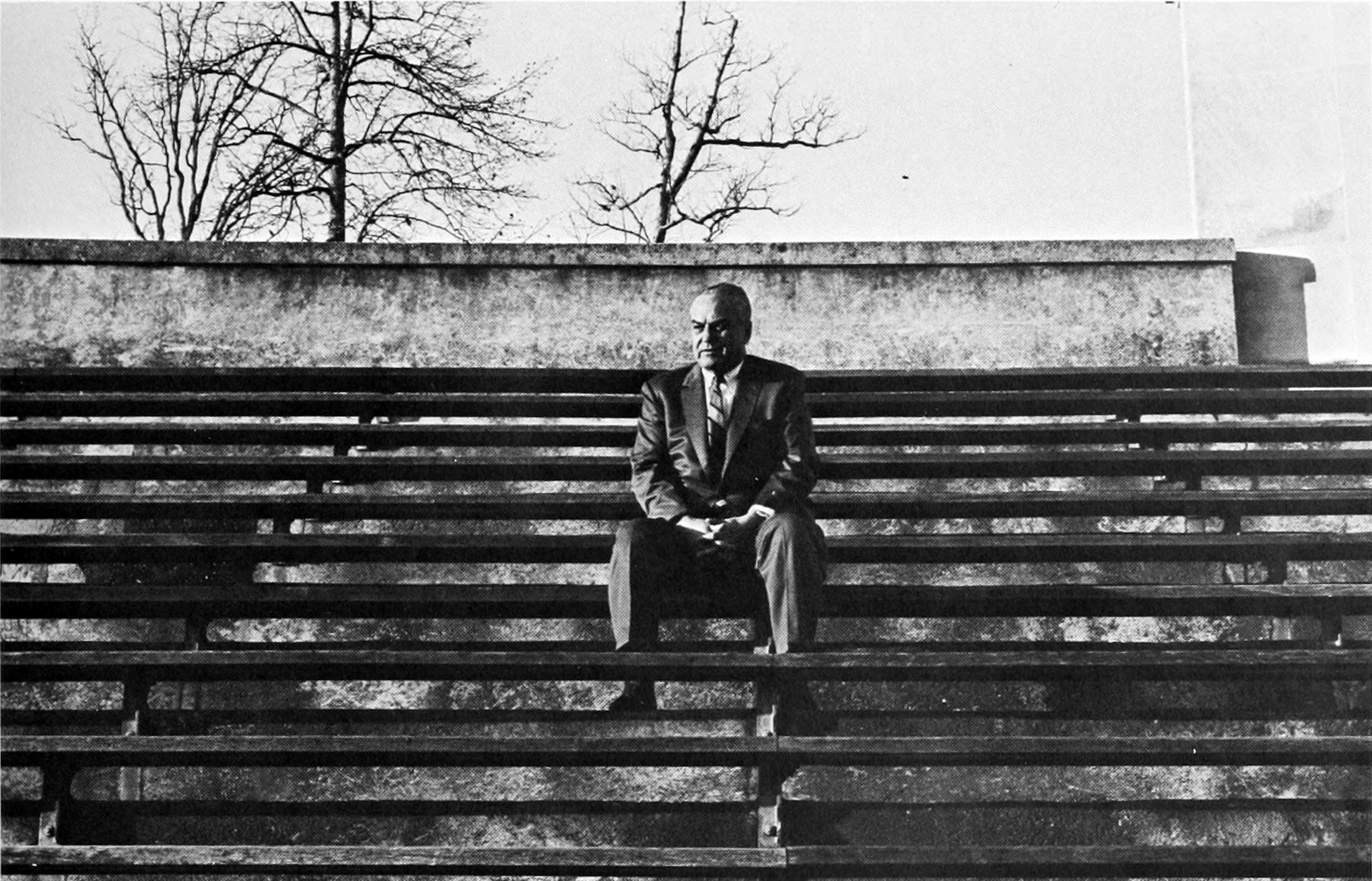
Cameron in Wallace Wade Stadium during his tenure as Duke's athletic director

After Wade entered the military service in World War II, Cameron became the head football coach. In four years Cameron's teams won three conference championships, compiled a record of 25–11–1 and won the 1945 Sugar Bowl by beating Alabama, 29–26. Cameron became permanent Director of Physical Education and Athletics in 1946 when Wade returned and resumed coaching football.

== Later life ==
Cameron was a founder of the Atlantic Coast Conference, chaired the basketball committee of the Southern and ACC conferences for decades, was on the selection committee for the NFL Hall of Fame and was on the governing committee of the Olympics.

Cameron died at the age 86 on November 25, 1988, at his home in Durham, North Carolina.

== Head coaching record ==
=== Basketball ===
Record table
| Season | Coach | Overall | Conference | Standing | Postseason |
|---|---|---|---|---|---|
Washington and Lee Generals (Southern Conference) (1924–1925)
| 1924–25 | Washington and Lee | 8–5 | — | — | — |
| Washington and Lee: | | 8–5 (.615) | | | |
Duke Blue Devils (Southern Conference) (1928–1942)
| 1928–29 | Duke | 12–8 | 5–4 | — | — |
| 1929–30 | Duke | 18–2 | 9–1 | — | — |
| 1930–31 | Duke | 14–7 | 5–4 | — | — |
| 1931–32 | Duke | 14–11 | 6–5 | — | — |
| 1932–33 | Duke | 17–5 | 7–3 | — | — |
| 1933–34 | Duke | 18–6 | 9–4 | — | — |
| 1934–35 | Duke | 18–8 | 10–4 | — | — |
| 1935–36 | Duke | 20–6 | 4–5 | — | — |
| 1936–37 | Duke | 15–8 | 11–6 | — | — |
| 1937–38 | Duke | 15–9 | 9–5 | — | — |
| 1938–39 | Duke | 10–12 | 8–8 | — | — |
| 1939–40 | Duke | 19–7 | 13–2 | — | — |
| 1940–41 | Duke | 14–8 | 8–4 | — | — |
| 1941–42 | Duke | 22–2 | 15–1 | — | — |
| Duke: | | 226–99 (.695) | 119–56 | | |
| Total: | | 234–104 (.692) | | | |
National champion Postseason invitational champion Conference regular season champion Conference regular season and conference tournament champion Division regular season champion Division regular season and conference tournament champion Conference tournament champion

=== Football ===
| Year | Team | Overall | Conference | Standing | Bowl/playoffs | AP^{#} |
|---|---|---|---|---|---|---|
Duke Blue Devils (Southern Conference) (1942–1945)
| 1942 | Duke | 5–4–1 | 3–1–1 | T–4th | | |
| 1943 | Duke | 8–1 | 4–0 | 1st | | 7 |
| 1944 | Duke | 6–4 | 4–0 | 1st | W Sugar | 11 |
| 1945 | Duke | 6–2 | 4–0 | 1st | | 13 |
| Duke: | | 25–11–1 | 15–1–1 | | | |
| Total: | | 25–11–1 | | | | |
National championship Conference title Conference division title or championship game berth
