= Card Gymnasium =

Arena in Durham, North Carolina

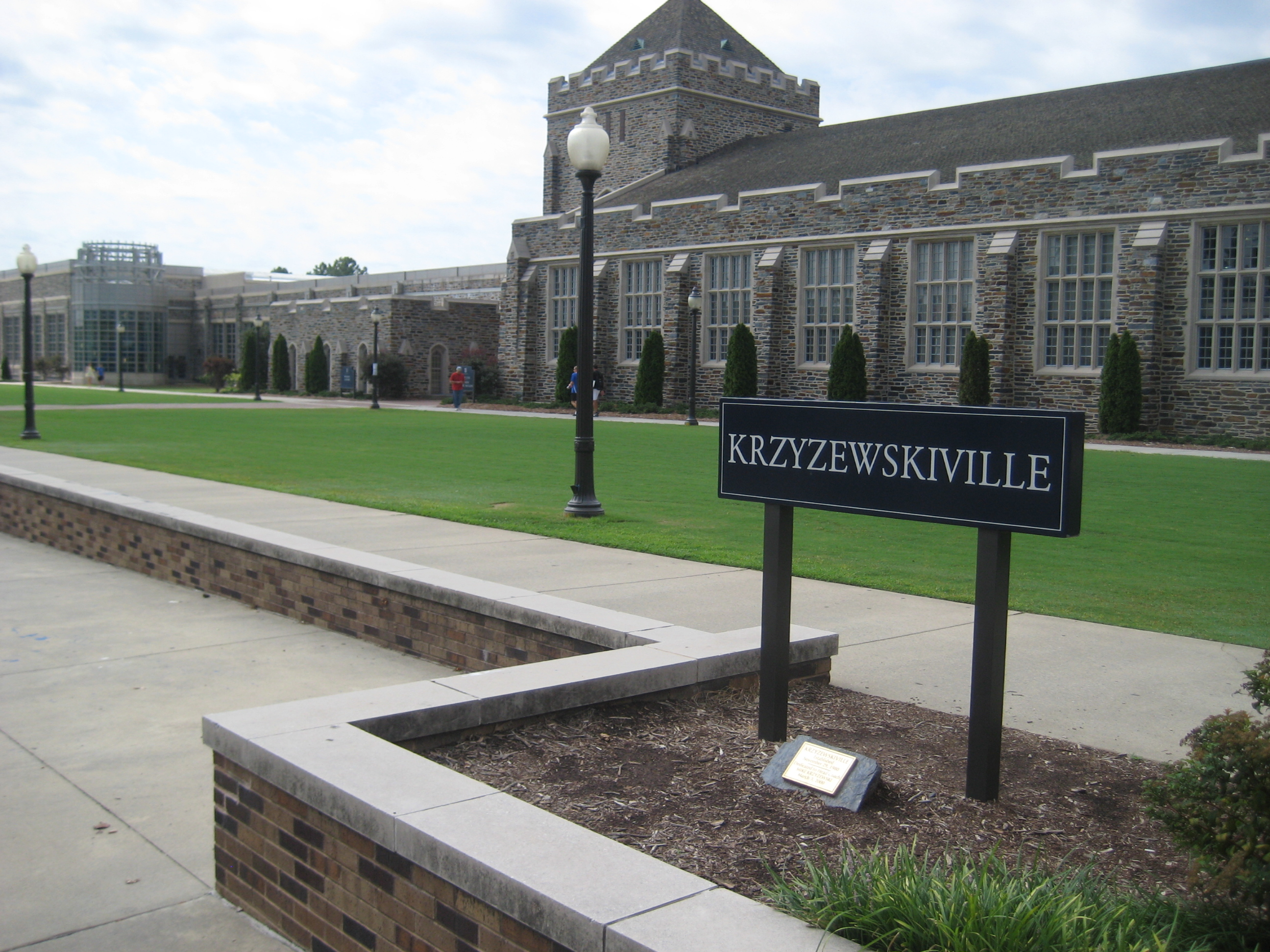
- Card Gym shown behind Krzyzewskiville
- Interactive map of Card Gymnasium
- Former names: Duke Gymnasium (1930–1958)
- Location: 320 Towerview Drive; Durham, NC 27708
- Coordinates: 35.997374°N 78.941392°W
- Owner: Duke University
- Operator: Duke University
- Surface: Hardwood

Construction
- Opened: 1930
- Cost: $345,557
- Architect: Office of Horace Trumbauer

Tenants
- Duke Blue Devils (Wrestling, Fencing, Men’s Basketball 1930–1939)

Card Gymnasium is a multi-purpose arena in Durham, North Carolina. It was home to the Duke University Blue Devils basketball team from its opening in 1930 until Cameron Indoor Stadium opened in 1940. During its years as home to the men's basketball team, it had a capacity of approximately 4,000. It was originally named Duke Gymnasium before being named after former Blue Devils head basketball coach, Wilbur Wade Card, in 1958. It currently serves as the home to Duke Wrestling and Fencing.

== Predecessors ==
The two previous venues used by the basketball team still stand, a short walk from each other on the East Campus.

Immediately prior to the opening of Card Gymnasium, the games were held in Alumni Memorial Gymnasium, which had opened in 1924. That building stands west of the traffic circle, the Lilly Library and the tennis courts. It is now part of the Brodie Recreation Center.

The earliest games were played at an Angier B. Duke Gymnasium, otherwise known as "The Ark". It contained a smaller court than what is now standard. The building dates to 1898, and intercollegiate basketball was first played there in about 1906. After the team left at the end of 1923, the building was remodeled for various purposes through the years, eventually becoming a dance studio. It stands just east of the traffic circle and the East Campus Wellness Center.

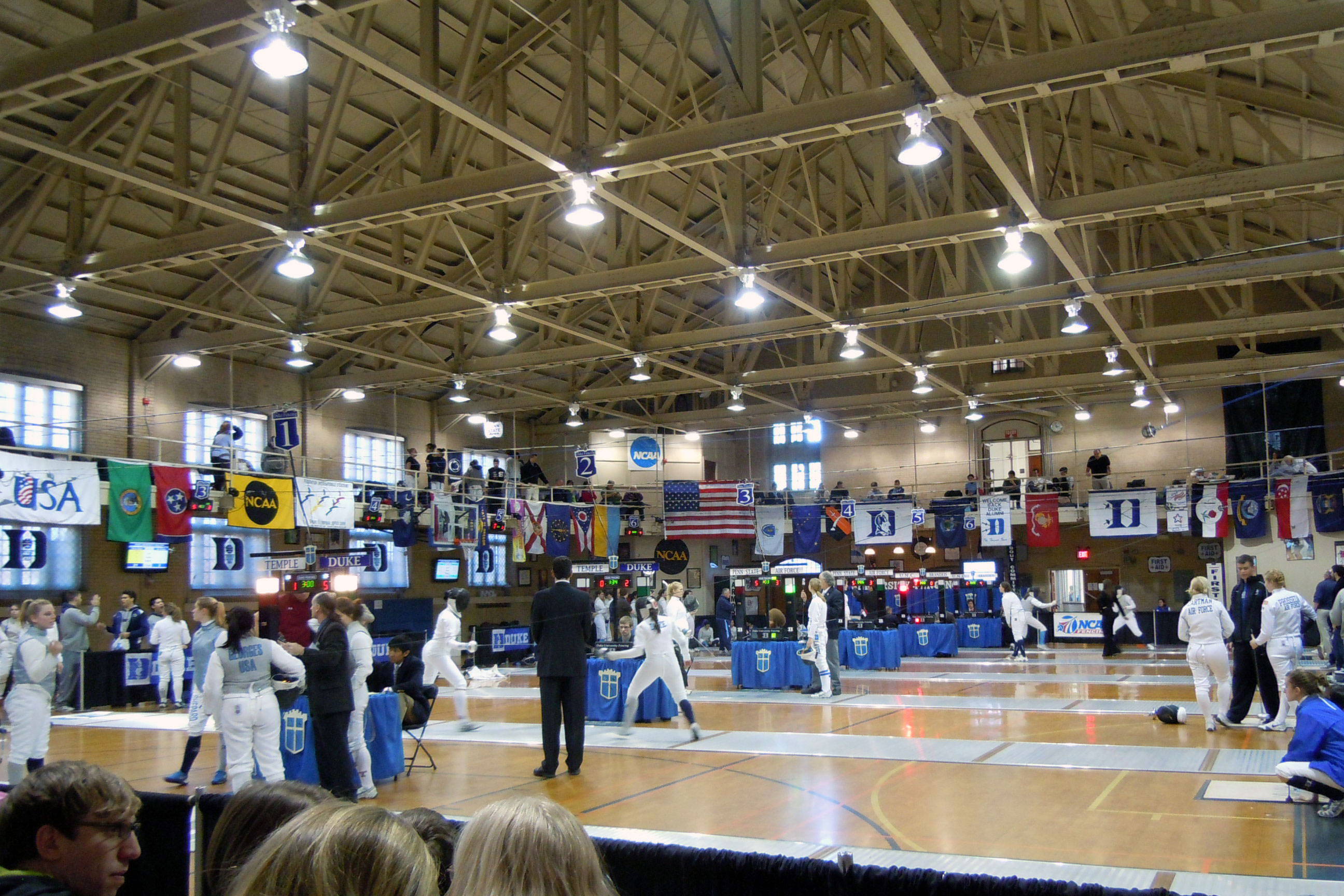
Duke fencing meet at Card
