= Thompson Gym =

Indoor arena in Raleigh, North Carolina

Coordinates: 35.7827°N 78.6668°W

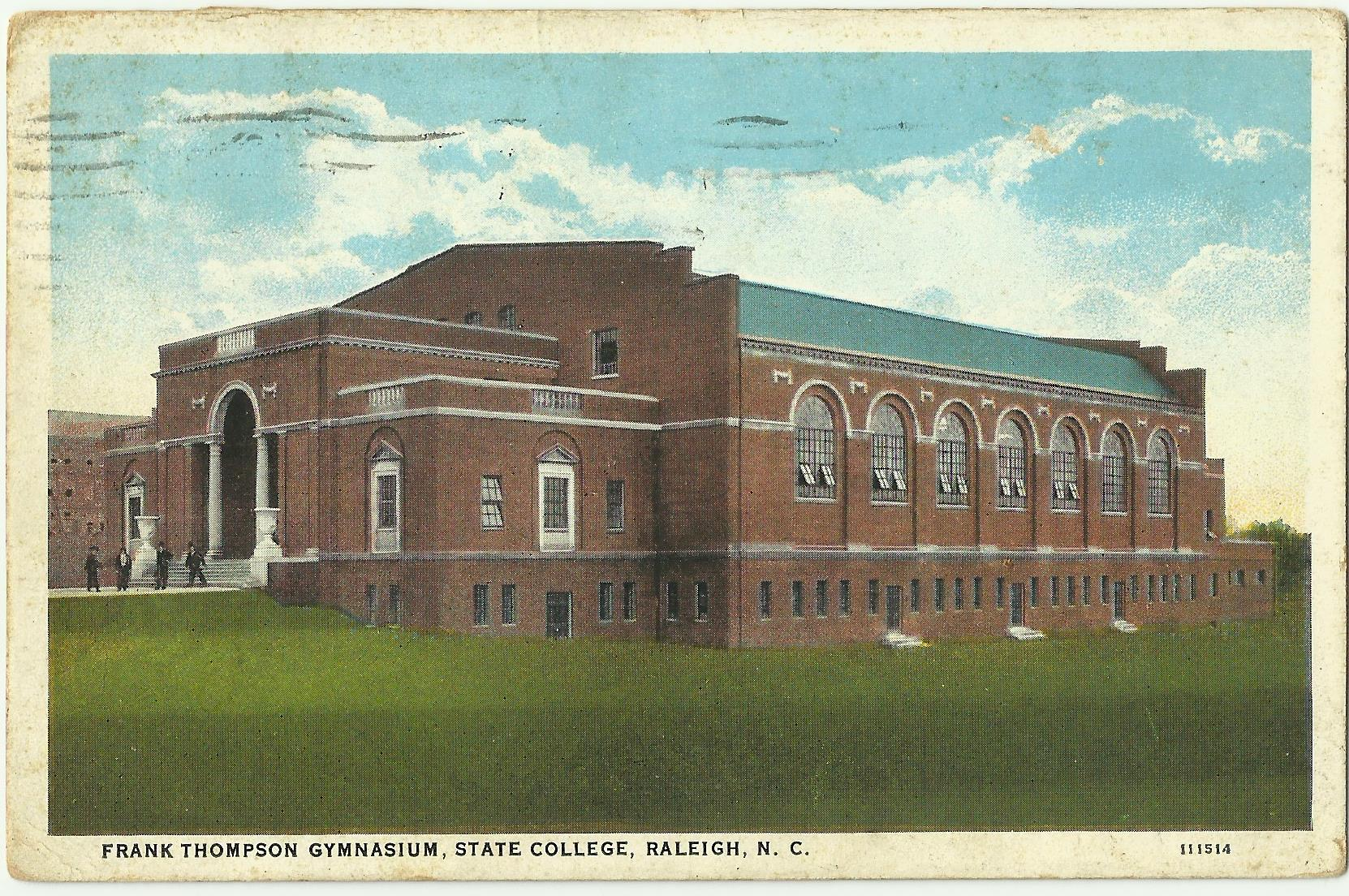

Thompson Gym, built in 1925, was the indoor arena of North Carolina State University until Reynolds Coliseum opened in 1949. The facility hosted mainly basketball games, including the Southern Conference men's basketball tournament from 1933 to 1946. Reynolds Coliseum has since been replaced by Lenovo Center.

The building has since been converted to a theater seating 250 people.

It was named for Frank Martin Thompson, an NCSU athlete killed in World War I.
