= 1948–49 Duke Blue Devils men's basketball team =

American college basketball season

1948–49 Duke Blue Devils men's basketball
- Conference: Southern Conference
- Record: 13–9 (5–7 Southern)
- Head coach: Gerry Gerard
- Home arena: Duke Indoor Stadium

1948–49 Southern Conference men's basketball standings
	Conf.				Overall
Team	W		L	PCT	W		L	PCT
No. 13 North Carolina State†	14	–	1	.933	25	–	8	.758
William & Mary	10	–	3	.769	24	–	10	.706
North Carolina	13	–	5	.722	20	–	8	.714
George Washington	9	–	4	.692	18	–	8	.692
Davidson	11	–	6	.647	18	–	8	.692
South Carolina	7	–	6	.538	10	–	12	.455
Wake Forest	7	–	7	.500	11	–	13	.458
Maryland	7	–	7	.500	9	–	17	.346
Virginia Tech	6	–	8	.429	10	–	13	.435
Duke	5	–	7	.417	13	–	9	.591
Clemson	6	–	9	.400	10	–	11	.476
Washington and Lee	5	–	9	.357	10	–	12	.455
Richmond	5	–	10	.333	8	–	15	.348
Furman	4	–	11	.267	8	–	14	.364
VMI	3	–	8	.273	3	–	16	.158
The Citadel	0	–	11	.000	1	–	17	.056
† Southern Conference Tournament winner Rankings from AP Poll

The 1948–49 Duke Blue Devils men's basketball team represented Duke University during the 1948–49 men's college basketball season. The head coach was Gerry Gerard, coaching his seventh season with the Blue Devils. The team finished with an overall record of 13–9.
