= The Citadel Bulldogs basketball, 1940–1949 =

The Citadel Bulldogs basketball teams represented The Citadel, The Military College of South Carolina in Charleston, South Carolina, United States. The program was established in 1900–01, and has continuously fielded a team since 1912–13. Their primary rivals are College of Charleston, Furman and VMI.

== 1939–40 ==
1939–40 The Citadel Bulldogs men's basketball
- Conference: Southern Conference
- Record: 8–9 (6–4 SoCon)
- Head coach: Rock Norman/Ben Parker
- Home arena: Thompson Hall/The Citadel Armory

1939–40 Southern Conference men's basketball standings
	Conf.				Overall
Team	W		L	PCT	W		L	PCT
Duke	13	–	2	.867	19	–	7	.731
North Carolina †	11	–	2	.846	23	–	3	.885
Washington and Lee	7	–	3	.700	13	–	5	.722
Wake Forest	10	–	5	.667	13	–	9	.591
Maryland	7	–	5	.583	14	–	9	.609
Clemson	9	–	7	.563	9	–	12	.429
Richmond	5	–	4	.556	11	–	6	.647
The Citadel	6	–	5	.545	8	–	9	.471
William & Mary	6	–	5	.545	12	–	11	.522
Furman	4	–	6	.400	11	–	11	.500
North Carolina State	5	–	10	.333	8	–	11	.421
Davidson	4	–	11	.267	8	–	13	.381
South Carolina	3	–	10	.231	5	–	13	.278
VMI	2	–	9	.182	3	–	12	.200
Virginia Tech	1	–	9	.100	4	–	15	.211
† Southern Conference Tournament winner

The Bulldogs moved into their new venue, The Citadel Armory on January 20, 1940. Ben Parker replaced Rock Norman as head coach on January 27, 1940.

Date time, TV	Opponent	Result	Record	Site city, state
January 5	Furman	W 30–24	1–0 (1–0)	Thompson Hall; Charleston, South Carolina
January 6*	Erskine	W 40–38	2–0	Thompson Hall; Charleston, South Carolina
January 12*	Presbyterian	L 36–38	2–1	Thompson Hall; Charleston, South Carolina
January 13	South Carolina	W 33–27	3–1 (2–0)	Thompson Hall; Charleston, South Carolina
January 16	Duke	L 40–51	3–2 (2–1)	Thompson Hall; Charleston, South Carolina
January 17	at North Carolina	L 36–66	3–3 (2–2)	Woollen Gymnasium; Chapel Hill, North Carolina
January 20*	Wofford	L 39–45	3–4	The Citadel Armory; Charleston, South Carolina
January 27	William & Mary	W 36–35	4–4 (3–2)	The Citadel Armory; Charleston, South Carolina
February 1*	at Presbyterian	L 32–40	4–5	Clinton, South Carolina
February 2	at South Carolina	W 27–26	5–5 (4–2)	Columbia, South Carolina
February 3	at Davidson	L 42–52	5–6 (4–3)	Alumni Gymnasium; Davidson, North Carolina
February 10	Clemson	L 27–38	5–7 (4–4)	The Citadel Armory; Charleston, South Carolina
February 17	Davidson	W 46–31	6–7 (5–4)	The Citadel Armory; Charleston, South Carolina
February 21	at Furman	W 36–35	7–7 (6–4)	Greenville, South Carolina
February 22*	at Wofford	W 28–23	8–7	Spartanburg, South Carolina
February 23	at Clemson	L 30–46	8–8 (6–5)	Clemson Field House; Clemson, South Carolina
1940 Southern Conference men's basketball tournament
February 29	Duke	L 35–40	8–9	Thompson Gym; Raleigh, North Carolina
*Non-conference game. (#) Tournament seedings in parentheses. All times are in Eastern Time.

== 1940–41 ==
1940–41 The Citadel Bulldogs men's basketball
- Conference: Southern Conference
- Record: 3–12 (1–9 SoCon)
- Head coach: Ben Parker
- Home arena: The Citadel Armory

1940–41 Southern Conference men's basketball standings
	Conf.				Overall
Team	W		L	PCT	W		L	PCT
North Carolina	14	–	1	.933	19	–	9	.679
South Carolina	8	–	3	.727	15	–	9	.625
William & Mary	8	–	3	.727	15	–	10	.600
Washington and Lee	9	–	4	.692	11	–	11	.500
Duke †	8	–	4	.667	14	–	8	.636
VMI	8	–	4	.667	10	–	6	.625
Richmond	7	–	5	.583	11	–	10	.524
Wake Forest	7	–	6	.538	9	–	9	.500
Clemson	7	–	8	.467	8	–	14	.364
Davidson	5	–	7	.417	11	–	12	.478
North Carolina State	6	–	9	.400	6	–	9	.400
Virginia Tech	4	–	8	.333	8	–	13	.381
The Citadel	1	–	8	.111	5	–	13	.278
Furman	1	–	10	.091	4	–	13	.235
Maryland	0	–	13	.000	1	–	21	.045
† Southern Conference Tournament winner

Date time, TV	Opponent	Result	Record	Site city, state
Exhibition games
*	at Parris Island Marines	W 28–27		Parris Island, South Carolina
*	at Parris Island Marines	W 55–36		Parris Island, South Carolina
*	at Savannah Ice Service	L 51–62		Savannah, Georgia
*	at Augusta Sporters	W 58–50		Augusta, Georgia
Regular Season
January 10*	Presbyterian	L 36–39	0–1	The Citadel Armory; Charleston, South Carolina
January 11	Furman	L 44–48	0–2 (0–1)	The Citadel Armory; Charleston, South Carolina
January 17	at South Carolina	L 28–40	0–3 (0–2)	Columbia, South Carolina
January 18*	Wofford	W 46–41	1–3	The Citadel Armory; Charleston, South Carolina
*	vs. Erskine	W 46–41	2–3	
January 30	at Davidson	L 43–51	2–4 (0–3)	Alumni Gymnasium; Davidson, North Carolina
January 31	at Wake Forest	L 48–63	2–5 (0–4)	Wake Forest, North Carolina
February 1	at NC State	W 57–50	3–5 (1–4)	Thompson Gym; Raleigh, North Carolina
February 3	at South Carolina	L 37–55	3–6 (1–5)	Columbia, South Carolina
February 8	Clemson	L 48–62	3–7 (1–6)	The Citadel Armory; Charleston, South Carolina
February 12*	at Presbyterian	L 48–53	3–8	Clinton, South Carolina
February 15	Davidson	L 37–39	3–9 (1–7)	The Citadel Armory; Charleston, South Carolina
February 21	at Clemson	L 43–62	3–10 (1–8)	Clemson Field House; Calhoun, South Carolina
February 22*	at Wofford	L 42–65	3–11	Spartanburg, South Carolina
February 24	at Furman	L 35–41	3–12 (1–9)	Greenville, South Carolina
*Non-conference game. (#) Tournament seedings in parentheses. All times are in Eastern Time.

== 1941–42 ==
1941–42 The Citadel Bulldogs men's basketball
- Conference: Southern Conference
- Record: 2–14 (1–12 SoCon)
- Head coach: Ben Clemons
- Home arena: The Citadel Armory

1941–42 Southern Conference men's basketball standings
	Conf.				Overall
Team	W		L	PCT	W		L	PCT
Duke †	15	–	1	.938	22	–	2	.917
George Washington	8	–	3	.727	11	–	9	.550
Wake Forest	13	–	5	.722	16	–	8	.667
North Carolina State	9	–	4	.692	15	–	7	.682
William & Mary	8	–	4	.667	15	–	9	.625
South Carolina	8	–	4	.667	12	–	9	.571
North Carolina	9	–	5	.643	14	–	9	.609
Washington and Lee	7	–	7	.500	10	–	15	.400
Furman	7	–	8	.467	10	–	9	.526
Richmond	4	–	8	.333	9	–	9	.500
Virginia Tech	4	–	8	.333	10	–	10	.500
VMI	5	–	10	.333	7	–	11	.389
Maryland	3	–	8	.273	7	–	15	.318
Davidson	3	–	9	.250	12	–	13	.480
Clemson	2	–	10	.167	3	–	14	.176
The Citadel	1	–	12	.077	2	–	14	.125
† Southern Conference Tournament winner

Date time, TV	Opponent	Result	Record	Site city, state
January 9*	Presbyterian	L 40–50	0–1	The Citadel Armory; Charleston, South Carolina
January 10*	Newberry	W 45–28	1–1	The Citadel Armory; Charleston, SC
January 24	NC State	L 23–41	1–2 (0–1)	The Citadel Armory; Charleston, South Carolina
January 28	vs. Virginia Tech	L 35–48	1–3 (0–2)	Charlotte, North Carolina
January 31	Furman	W 40–22	2–3 (1–2)	The Citadel Armory; Charleston, South Carolina
February 1	at South Carolina	L 27–47	2–4 (1–3)	Columbia, South Carolina
February 3	at Furman	L 22–42	2–5 (1–4)	Greenville, South Carolina
February 7	Clemson	L 38–39	2–6 (1–5)	The Citadel Armory; Charleston, South Carolina
February 9	at Wake Forest	L 40–64	2–7 (1–6)	Wake Forest, North Carolina
February 10	at NC State	L 40–64	2–8 (1–7)	Thompson Gym; Raleigh, North Carolina
February 13	Wake Forest	L 51–60	2–9 (1–8)	The Citadel Armory; Charleston, South Carolina
February 14	at Davidson	L 39–41	2–10 (1–9)	Alumni Gymnasium; Davidson, North Carolina
February 17	Davidson	L 33–48	2–11 (1–10)	The Citadel Armory; Charleston, South Carolina
February 21	South Carolina	L 52–54 ^{OT}	2–12 (1–11)	The Citadel Armory; Charleston, South Carolina
February 24	at Clemson	L 27–35	2–13 (1–12)	Clemson Field House; Calhoun, South Carolina
February 27*	Erskine	L 35–36	2–14	The Citadel Armory; Charleston, South Carolina
*Non-conference game. (#) Tournament seedings in parentheses. All times are in Eastern Time.

== 1942–43 ==
1942–43 The Citadel Bulldogs men's basketball
- Conference: Southern Conference
- Record: 8–4 (5–3 SoCon)
- Head coach: Bo Sherman
- Home arena: The Citadel Armory

1942–43 Southern Conference men's basketball standings
	Conf.				Overall
Team	W		L	PCT	W		L	PCT
Duke	12	–	1	.923	20	–	6	.769
George Washington †	8	–	2	.800	17	–	6	.739
South Carolina	6	–	3	.667	13	–	6	.684
Davidson	7	–	4	.636	18	–	6	.750
The Citadel	5	–	3	.625	8	–	5	.615
William & Mary	6	–	4	.600	11	–	10	.524
VMI	7	–	5	.583	8	–	8	.500
North Carolina State	7	–	5	.583	7	–	9	.438
Maryland	5	–	5	.500	8	–	8	.500
Richmond	4	–	4	.500	11	–	5	.688
North Carolina	8	–	9	.471	12	–	10	.545
Virginia Tech	3	–	6	.333	7	–	7	.500
Washington and Lee	2	–	10	.167	7	–	12	.368
Wake Forest	1	–	10	.091	1	–	10	.091
Clemson	0	–	10	.000	3	–	13	.188
† Southern Conference Tournament winner

Date time, TV	Opponent	Result	Record	Site city, state
February 2	at South Carolina	L 41–47	0–1 (0–1)	Columbia, South Carolina
February 5	Wake Forest	W 38–36	1–1 (1–1)	The Citadel Armory; Charleston, South Carolina
February 5	Wake Forest	W 52–39	2–1 (2–1)	The Citadel Armory; Charleston, South Carolina
February 6	Clemson	W 49–35	3–1 (3–1)	The Citadel Armory; Charleston, South Carolina
*	at Shaw Field; Exh.	W 51–40		Sumter, South Carolina
February 12*	Newberry	W 46–38	4–1	The Citadel Armory; Charleston, South Carolina
February 13*	Charleston Coast Guard	W 52–29	5–1	The Citadel Armory; Charleston, South Carolina
February 19	at Davidson	L 49–54	5–2 (3–2)	Alumni Gymnasium; Davidson, North Carolina
February 23	Davidson	L 44–48	5–3 (3–3)	The Citadel Armory; Charleston, South Carolina
February 24	at Clemson	W 63–38	6–3 (4–3)	Clemson Field House; Clemson, South Carolina
*	Lemoco; Exh.	W 41–34		The Citadel Armory; Charleston, South Carolina
February 27	South Carolina	W 44–38	6–4 (5–3)	The Citadel Armory; Charleston, South Carolina
1943 Southern Conference men's basketball tournament
March 4	vs. South Carolina	W 37–23	8–4	Thompson Gym; Raleigh, North Carolina
March 5	vs. Duke	L 37–56	8–5	Thompson Gym; Raleigh, North Carolina
*Non-conference game. (#) Tournament seedings in parentheses. All times are in Eastern Time.

== 1943–44 ==
1943–44 The Citadel Bulldogs men's basketball
- Conference: Southern Conference
- Record: 2–3 (0–1 SoCon)
- Head coach: Ben Clemons
- Home arena: The Citadel Armory

1943–44 Southern Conference men's basketball standings
	Conf.				Overall
Team	W		L	PCT	W		L	PCT
North Carolina	9	–	1	.900	17	–	10	.630
Virginia Tech	4	–	1	.800	11	–	4	.733
Duke †	4	–	2	.667	13	–	13	.500
Maryland	2	–	1	.667	4	–	14	.222
Richmond	2	–	2	.500	7	–	6	.538
Davidson	3	–	4	.429	16	–	7	.696
South Carolina	1	–	2	.333	13	–	2	.867
Clemson	1	–	2	.333	1	–	10	.091
North Carolina State	2	–	5	.286	5	–	13	.278
William & Mary	1	–	3	.250	10	–	11	.476
The Citadel	0	–	1	.000	2	–	3	.400
VMI	0	–	5	.000	0	–	14	.000
† Southern Conference Tournament winner

Date time, TV	Opponent	Result	Record	Site city, state
February 5	Davidson	L 43–47	0–1 (0–1)	The Citadel Armory; Charleston, South Carolina
February 7*	Stark General Hospital	W 24–23	1–1	The Citadel Armory; Charleston, South Carolina
February 9*	Fort Moultrie	W 44–23	2–1	The Citadel Armory; Charleston, South Carolina
*	at Fort Moultrie	L 28–30	2–2	Sullivan's Island, South Carolina
*	at Florence Army Airbase	L 38–42	2–3	Florence, South Carolina
*Non-conference game. (#) Tournament seedings in parentheses. All times are in Eastern Time.

== 1944–45 ==
1944–45 The Citadel Bulldogs men's basketball
- Conference: Southern Conference
- Record: 9–5 (8–4 SoCon)
- Head coach: Ernest Wehman
- Home arena: The Citadel Armory

1944–45 Southern Conference men's basketball standings
	Conf.				Overall
Team	W		L	PCT	W		L	PCT
South Carolina	9	–	0	1.000	19	–	3	.864
Richmond	2	–	0	1.000	3	–	4	.429
Duke	6	–	1	.857	13	–	9	.591
North Carolina †	11	–	3	.786	22	–	6	.786
The Citadel	8	–	4	.667	16	–	7	.696
North Carolina State	7	–	5	.583	10	–	11	.476
William & Mary	3	–	4	.429	7	–	11	.389
Clemson	3	–	5	.375	8	–	8	.500
Maryland	2	–	5	.286	2	–	14	.125
Virginia Tech	1	–	3	.250	6	–	8	.429
Davidson	2	–	7	.222	9	–	9	.500
VMI	1	–	4	.200	2	–	10	.167
Wake Forest	0	–	6	.000	3	–	14	.176
Furman	0	–	8	.000	2	–	15	.118
† Southern Conference Tournament winner

Date time, TV	Opponent	Result	Record	Site city, state
Exhibition games
*	Charleston Navy Base	L 48–66		The Citadel Armory; Charleston, South Carolina
*	Charleston Marines	W 49–32		The Citadel Armory; Charleston, South Carolina
*	Gray Line	W 43–32		The Citadel Armory; Charleston, South Carolina
*	Charleston Marines	W 64–26		The Citadel Armory; Charleston, South Carolina
*	Charleston Military Police	W 60–34		The Citadel Armory; Charleston, South Carolina
*	Charleston Navy Base	W 57–23		The Citadel Armory; Charleston, South Carolina
Regular Season
January 12	Furman	W 46–28	1–0 (1–0)	The Citadel Armory; Charleston, South Carolina
January 13	Furman	W 46–32	2–0 (2–0)	The Citadel Armory; Charleston, South Carolina
January 19	at Furman	W 57–36	3–0 (3–0)	Greenville, South Carolina
January 20	at Furman	W 60–52	4–0 (4–0)	Greenville, South Carolina
January 27	South Carolina	L 51–59	4–1 (4–1)	The Citadel Armory; Charleston, South Carolina
February 2*	Newberry	W 55–44	5–1	The Citadel Armory; Charleston, South Carolina
February 3	Davidson	W 52–32	6–1 (5–1)	The Citadel Armory; Charleston, South Carolina
February 9	Clemson	L 43–52	6–2 (5–2)	The Citadel Armory; Charleston, South Carolina
February 10	Clemson	W 52–29	7–2 (6–2)	The Citadel Armory; Charleston, South Carolina
February 13	at Davidson	W 60–26	8–2 (7–2)	Alumni Gymnasium; Davidson, North Carolina
February 16	at Clemson	W 41–39	9–2 (8–2)	Clemson Field House; Clemson, South Carolina
February 16	at Clemson	L 38–43	9–3 (8–3)	Clemson Field House; Charleston, South Carolina
February 17	at South Carolina	L 47–73	9–4 (8–4)	Columbia, South Carolina
1945 Southern Conference men's basketball tournament
February 22	vs. William & Mary	L 41–54	9–5	Thompson Gym; Raleigh, North Carolina
*Non-conference game. (#) Tournament seedings in parentheses. All times are in Eastern Time.

== 1945–46 ==
1945–46 The Citadel Bulldogs men's basketball
- Conference: Southern Conference
- Record: 8–10 (2–6 SoCon)
- Head coach: Eugene Clark
- Home arena: The Citadel Armory

1945–46 Southern Conference men's basketball standings
	Conf.				Overall
Team	W		L	PCT	W		L	PCT
North Carolina	13	–	1	.929	30	–	5	.857
Duke †	12	–	2	.857	21	–	6	.778
Virginia Tech	7	–	3	.700	11	–	8	.579
Wake Forest	8	–	5	.615	12	–	6	.667
Maryland	5	–	4	.556	9	–	12	.429
William & Mary	5	–	5	.500	10	–	10	.500
Furman	4	–	4	.500	16	–	3	.842
George Washington	4	–	5	.444	7	–	8	.467
Clemson	5	–	7	.417	9	–	11	.450
North Carolina State	5	–	7	.417	6	–	12	.333
South Carolina	4	–	7	.364	9	–	11	.450
Davidson	5	–	9	.357	13	–	12	.520
Richmond	3	–	7	.300	8	–	12	.400
The Citadel	1	–	6	.143	7	–	11	.389
VMI	1	–	6	.143	1	–	10	.091
Washington and Lee	0	–	4	.000	2	–	11	.154
† Southern Conference tournament winner

Date time, TV	Opponent	Result	Record	Site city, state
January 11*	Gray Line	W 38–30	1–0	The Citadel Armory; Charleston, South Carolina
January 12*	Charleston Coast Guard	W 53–45	2–0	The Citadel Armory; Charleston, South Carolina
January 18*	Charleston Navy Base	L 41–57	2–1	The Citadel Armory; Charleston, South Carolina
January 19*	Wofford	W 46–40	3–1	The Citadel Armory; Charleston, South Carolina
January 21*	at Presbyterian	W 37–36	4–1	Clinton, South Carolina
January 22	at South Carolina	L 29–66	4–2 (0–1)	Columbia, South Carolina
January 26*	Erskine	W 57–15	5–2	The Citadel Armory; Charleston, South Carolina
February 1*	Newberry	L 44–50	5–3	The Citadel Armory; Charleston, South Carolina
February 3	Davidson	W 41–39	6–3 (1–1)	The Citadel Armory; Charleston, South Carolina
February 8*	Presbyterian	W 41–35	7–3	The Citadel Armory; Charleston, South Carolina
February 9	Clemson	L 46–63	7–4 (1–2)	The Citadel Armory; Charleston, South Carolina
February 11*	at Newberry	L 50–61	7–5	Newberry, South Carolina
February 12	at Davidson	L 30–37	7–6 (1–3)	Alumni Gymnasium; Davidson, North Carolina
February 15	South Carolina	L 33–52	7–7 (1–4)	The Citadel Armory; Charleston, South Carolina
February 16	Furman	W 65–45	8–7 (2–4)	The Citadel Armory; Charleston, South Carolina
February 22*	at Wofford	L 44–58	8–8	Spartanburg, South Carolina
February 23	at Clemson	L 24–76	8–9 (2–5)	Clemson Field House; Clemson, South Carolina
February 25	at Furman	L 45–58	8–10 (2–6)	Greenville, South Carolina
*Non-conference game. (#) Tournament seedings in parentheses. All times are in Eastern Time.

== 1946–47 ==
1946–47 The Citadel Bulldogs men's basketball
- Conference: Southern Conference
- Record: 4–11 (0–10 SoCon)
- Head coach: Whitey Piro
- Home arena: The Citadel Armory

1946–47 Southern Conference men's basketball standings
	Conf.				Overall
Team	W		L	PCT	W		L	PCT
North Carolina State †	11	–	2	.846	26	–	5	.839
North Carolina	10	–	2	.833	19	–	8	.704
Duke	10	–	4	.714	19	–	8	.704
George Washington	9	–	4	.692	21	–	7	.750
Maryland	9	–	5	.643	14	–	10	.583
Richmond	8	–	5	.615	17	–	9	.654
South Carolina	7	–	5	.583	16	–	9	.640
Washington and Lee	7	–	6	.538	16	–	7	.696
Davidson	7	–	7	.500	17	–	8	.680
William & Mary	6	–	6	.500	14	–	12	.538
Wake Forest	8	–	9	.471	11	–	13	.458
Furman	5	–	7	.417	9	–	10	.474
Virginia Tech	4	–	9	.308	13	–	13	.500
Clemson	2	–	12	.143	7	–	13	.350
The Citadel	1	–	11	.083	5	–	11	.313
VMI	1	–	11	.083	2	–	14	.125
† Southern Conference Tournament winner

Date time, TV	Opponent	Result	Record	Site city, state
January 10*	Presbyterian	W 66–47	1–0	The Citadel Armory; Charlreston, South Carolina
January 14*	at Presbyterian	W 57–49	2–0	Clinton, South Carolina
January 15	at South Carolina	L 35–62	2–1 (0–1)	Columbia, South Carolina
January 17	Furman	L 51–59	2–2 (0–2)	The Citadel Armory; Charleston, South Carolina
January 24	at Clemson	L 40–60	2–3 (0–3)	Clemson Field House; Clemson, South Carolina
January 25	at Furman	L 41–52	2–4 (0–4)	Greenville, South Carolina
January 27*	at Newberry	W 60–49	3–4	Newberry, South Carolina
February 1	Davidson	L 34–60	3–5 (0–5)	The Citadel Armory; Charleston, South Carolina
February 8	at Wake Forest	L 46–56	3–6 (0–6)	Wake Forest, North Carolina
February 10	NC State	L 35–75	3–7 (0–7)	The Citadel Armory; Charleston, South Carolina
February 11	Davidson	L 46–72	3–8 (0–8)	The Citadel Armory; Charleston, South Carolina
February 14	South Carolina	L 45–49	3–9 (0–9)	The Citadel Armory; Charleston, South Carolina
February 21*	Newberry	W 41–35	4–9	The Citadel Armory; Charleston, South Carolina
February 25	at George Washington	L 41–72	4–10 (0–10)	Washington, D.C.
February 27	at Maryland	L 40–52	4–11 (0–11)	Ritchie Coliseum; College Park, Maryland
*Non-conference game. (#) Tournament seedings in parentheses. All times are in Eastern Time.

== 1947–48 ==
1947–48 The Citadel Bulldogs men's basketball
- Conference: Southern Conference
- Record: 8–9 (4–8 SoCon)
- Head coach: Bernard O'Neil
- Home arena: The Citadel Armory

1947–48 Southern Conference men's basketball standings
	Conf.				Overall
Team	W		L	PCT	W		L	PCT
North Carolina State †	12	–	0	1.000	29	–	3	.906
George Washington	13	–	3	.813	19	–	7	.731
North Carolina	11	–	4	.733	20	–	7	.741
Maryland	9	–	6	.600	11	–	14	.440
Davidson	10	–	7	.588	19	–	9	.679
Virginia Tech	7	–	5	.583	14	–	9	.609
Duke	8	–	6	.571	17	–	12	.586
Wake Forest	8	–	7	.533	18	–	11	.621
William & Mary	8	–	7	.533	13	–	10	.565
South Carolina	8	–	7	.533	12	–	11	.522
Washington and Lee	5	–	9	.357	7	–	17	.292
The Citadel	4	–	8	.333	8	–	9	.471
Richmond	4	–	9	.308	8	–	14	.364
Furman	3	–	10	.231	11	–	15	.423
Clemson	3	–	14	.176	6	–	17	.261
VMI	1	–	12	.077	3	–	16	.158
† Southern Conference Tournament winner

Date time, TV	Opponent	Result	Record	Site city, state
December 6	William & Mary	L 41–64	0–1 (0–1)	The Citadel Armory; Charleston, South Carolina
December 10*	Charleston Navy Base	W 70–50	1–1	The Citadel Armory; Charleston, South Carolina
January 9	South Carolina	L 41–49	1–2 (0–2)	The Citadel Armory; Charleston, South Carolina
January 10*	Newberry	W 59–30	2–2	The Citadel Armory; Charleston, South Carolina
January 16	Furman	W 40–33	3–2 (1–2)	The Citadel Armory; Charleston, South Carolina
January 23	at Clemson	W 52–50	4–2 (2–2)	Clemson Field House; Clemson, South Carolina
January 24	at Furman	W 66–64	5–2 (3–2)	Greenville, South Carolina
January 26*	at Presbyterian	W 44–41	6–2	Clinton, South Carolina
January 29	at William & Mary	L 34–50	6–3 (3–3)	Blow Gymnasium; Williamsburg, Virginia
January 30	at Richmond	L 50–71	6–4 (3–4)	Blues Armory; Richmond, Virginia
February 3*	at Newberry	L 43–56	6–5	Newberry, South Carolina
February 7	Clemson	W 47–43	7–5 (4–4)	The Citadel Armory; Charleston, South Carolina
February 14	at Davidson	L 30–69	7–6 (4–5)	Alumni Gymnasium; Davidson, North Carolina
February 20*	Presbyterian	W 81–44	8–6	The Citadel Armory; Charleston, South Carolina
February 21	at Wake Forest	L 48–62	8–7 (4–6)	Wake Forest, North Carolina
February 27	Davidson	L 42–49	8–8 (4–7)	The Citadel Armory; Charleston, South Carolina
February 28	at South Carolina	L 38–53	8–9 (4–8)	Columbia, South Carolina
*Non-conference game. (#) Tournament seedings in parentheses. All times are in Eastern Time.

== 1948–49 ==
1948–49 The Citadel Bulldogs men's basketball
- Conference: Southern Conference
- Record: 1–15 (0–11 SoCon)
- Head coach: Bernard O'Neil
- Home arena: The Citadel Armory

1948–49 Southern Conference men's basketball standings
	Conf.				Overall
Team	W		L	PCT	W		L	PCT
No. 13 North Carolina State†	14	–	1	.933	25	–	8	.758
William & Mary	10	–	3	.769	24	–	10	.706
North Carolina	13	–	5	.722	20	–	8	.714
George Washington	9	–	4	.692	18	–	8	.692
Davidson	11	–	6	.647	18	–	8	.692
South Carolina	7	–	6	.538	10	–	12	.455
Wake Forest	7	–	7	.500	11	–	13	.458
Maryland	7	–	7	.500	9	–	17	.346
Virginia Tech	6	–	8	.429	10	–	13	.435
Duke	5	–	7	.417	13	–	9	.591
Clemson	6	–	9	.400	10	–	11	.476
Washington and Lee	5	–	9	.357	10	–	12	.455
Richmond	5	–	10	.333	8	–	15	.348
Furman	4	–	11	.267	8	–	14	.364
VMI	3	–	8	.273	3	–	16	.158
The Citadel	0	–	11	.000	1	–	17	.056
† Southern Conference Tournament winner Rankings from AP Poll

Date time, TV	Opponent	Result	Record	Site city, state
Exhibition games
*	Richmond Royals	L 39–55		The Citadel Armory; Charleston, South Carolina
*	Quantico Marines	L 38–62		The Citadel Armory; Charleston, South Carolina
Regular season
January 7	at Furman	L 57–65	0–1 (0–1)	Greenville, South Carolina
January 8	at Clemson	L 39–65	0–2 (0–2)	Clemson Field House; Clemson, South Carolina
January 11	at South Carolina	L 35–60	0–3 (0–3)	Columbia, South Carolina
January 15	Furman	L 38–55	0–4 (0–4)	The Citadel Armory; Charleston, South Carolina
January 22	at Wake Forest	L 36–57	0–5 (0–5)	Wake Forest, North Carolina
January 24	at Davidson	L 25–54	0–6 (0–6)	Alumni Gymnasium; Davidson, North Carolina
January 28*	Newberry	L 47–67	0–7	The Citadel Armory; Charleston, South Carolina
January 29*	Presbyterian	W 55–46	1–7	The Citadel Armory; Charleston, South Carolina
February 5	Clemson	L 44–63	1–8 (0–7)	The Citadel Armory; Charleston, South Carolina
February 11*	at Newberry	L 30–49	1–9	Newberry, North Carolina
February 12*	at Presbyterian	L 40–50	1–10	Clinton, South Carolina
February 18	at William & Mary	L 39–57	1–11 (0–8)	Blow Gymnasium; Williamsburg, Virginia
February 19	at Richmond	L 42–58	1–12 (0–9)	Blues Armory; Richmond, Virginia
February 23*	at Tennessee	L 42–64	1–13	Alumni Memorial Gym; Knoxville, Tennessee
February 25	South Carolina	L 45–58	1–14 (0–10)	The Citadel Armory; Charleston, South Carolina
February 26	Davidson	L 42–50	1–15 (0–11)	The Citadel Armory; Charleston, South Carolina
*Non-conference game. (#) Tournament seedings in parentheses. All times are in Eastern Time.
