= 1942–43 Duke Blue Devils men's basketball team =

American college basketball season

1942–43 Duke Blue Devils men's basketball

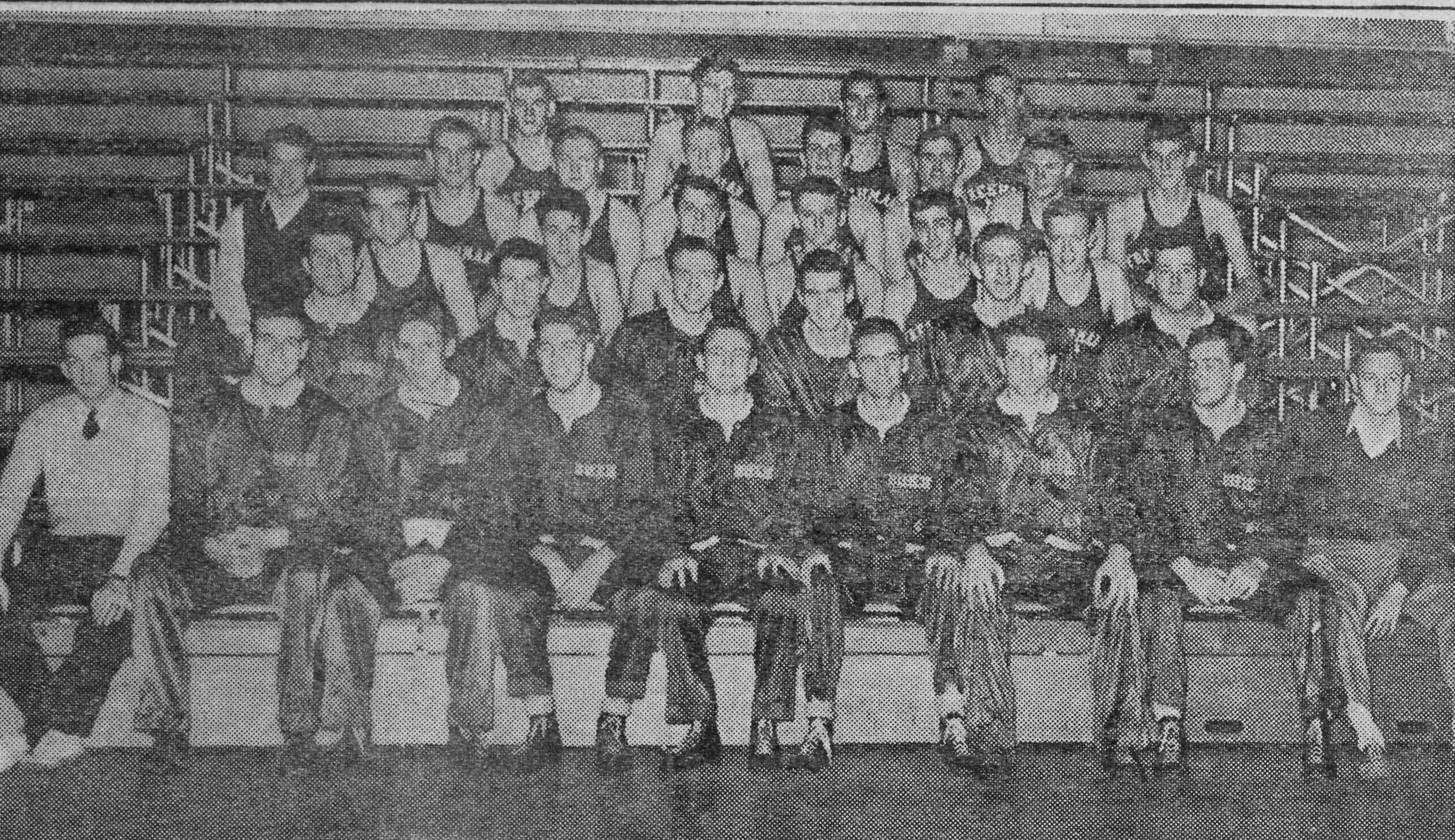

SoCon Regular Season champions
- Conference: Southern Conference
- Record: 20–6 (12–1 Southern)
- Head coach: Gerry Gerard
- Home arena: Duke Indoor Stadium

1942–43 Southern Conference men's basketball standings
	Conf.				Overall
Team	W		L	PCT	W		L	PCT
Duke	12	–	1	.923	20	–	6	.769
George Washington †	8	–	2	.800	17	–	6	.739
South Carolina	6	–	3	.667	13	–	6	.684
Davidson	7	–	4	.636	18	–	6	.750
The Citadel	5	–	3	.625	8	–	5	.615
William & Mary	6	–	4	.600	11	–	10	.524
VMI	7	–	5	.583	8	–	8	.500
North Carolina State	7	–	5	.583	7	–	9	.438
Maryland	5	–	5	.500	8	–	8	.500
Richmond	4	–	4	.500	11	–	5	.688
North Carolina	8	–	9	.471	12	–	10	.545
Virginia Tech	3	–	6	.333	7	–	7	.500
Washington and Lee	2	–	10	.167	7	–	12	.368
Wake Forest	1	–	10	.091	1	–	10	.091
Clemson	0	–	10	.000	3	–	13	.188
† Southern Conference Tournament winner

The 1942–43 Duke Blue Devils men's basketball team represented Duke University during the 1942–43 men's college basketball season. The head coach was Gerry Gerard, coaching his first season with the Blue Devils. The team finished with an overall record of 20–6.
