= 1947–48 William & Mary Indians men's basketball team =

American college basketball season

1947–48 William & Mary Indians men's basketball
- Conference: Southern Conference
- Record: 13–10 (8–7 SoCon)
- Head coach: Barney Wilson (1st season)
- Home arena: Blow Gymnasium

1947–48 Southern Conference men's basketball standings
	Conf.				Overall
Team	W		L	PCT	W		L	PCT
North Carolina State †	12	–	0	1.000	29	–	3	.906
George Washington	13	–	3	.813	19	–	7	.731
North Carolina	11	–	4	.733	20	–	7	.741
Maryland	9	–	6	.600	11	–	14	.440
Davidson	10	–	7	.588	19	–	9	.679
Virginia Tech	7	–	5	.583	14	–	9	.609
Duke	8	–	6	.571	17	–	12	.586
Wake Forest	8	–	7	.533	18	–	11	.621
William & Mary	8	–	7	.533	13	–	10	.565
South Carolina	8	–	7	.533	12	–	11	.522
Washington and Lee	5	–	9	.357	7	–	17	.292
The Citadel	4	–	8	.333	8	–	9	.471
Richmond	4	–	9	.308	8	–	14	.364
Furman	3	–	10	.231	11	–	15	.423
Clemson	3	–	14	.176	6	–	17	.261
VMI	1	–	12	.077	3	–	16	.158
† Southern Conference Tournament winner

The 1947–48 William & Mary Indians men's basketball team represented the College of William & Mary in intercollegiate basketball during the 1947–48 NCAA men's basketball season. Under the first year of head coach Barney Wilson, the team finished the season 13–10 and 8–7 in the Southern Conference. This was the 43rd season of the collegiate basketball program at William & Mary, whose nickname is now the Tribe. William & Mary played its home games at Blow Gymnasium.

The Indians finished in a tie for 8th place in the conference and qualified for the 1948 Southern Conference men's basketball tournament, hosted by Duke University at the Duke Indoor Stadium in Durham, North Carolina, where the Indians defeated Wake Forest in the opening round before losing to NC State in the quarterfinals.

The Indians played two teams for the first time this season: American International and Western Maryland.

== Schedule ==
Date time, TV	Rank^{#}	Opponent^{#}	Result	Record	Site city, state
Regular season
12/6/1947		at The Citadel	W 64–41	1–0 (1–0)	The Citadel Armory; Charleston, SC
12/8/1947		at Furman	L 50–51	1–1 (1–1)	Greenville, SC
*		Hampden–Sydney	L 36–37	1–2	Blow Gymnasium; Williamsburg, VA
*		Western Maryland	W 75–49	2–2	Blow Gymnasium; Williamsburg, VA
*		Virginia	W 51–33	3–2	Blow Gymnasium; Williamsburg, VA
		Wake Forest	L 52–61	3–3 (1–2)	Blow Gymnasium; Williamsburg, VA
*		Randolph–Macon	W 68–35	4–3	Blow Gymnasium; Williamsburg, VA
		VMI	W 53–39	5–3 (2–2)	Blow Gymnasium; Williamsburg, VA
		at VPI	L 41–59	5–4 (2–3)	War Memorial Gymnasium; Blacksburg, VA
		at Washington & Lee	L 56–61	5–5 (2–4)	Doremus Gymnasium; Lexington, VA
1/17/1948		at Richmond	W 50–47	6–5 (3–4)	Blues Armory; Richmond, VA
		The Citadel	W 50–34	7–5 (4–4)	Blow Gymnasium; Williamsburg, VA
		George Washington	L 40–65	7–6 (4–5)	Blow Gymnasium; Williamsburg, VA
2/5/1948		Duke	L 36–45	7–7 (4–6)	Blow Gymnasium; Williamsburg, VA
		VPI	W 46–42	8–7 (5–6)	Blow Gymnasium; Williamsburg, VA
		North Carolina	L 61–63	8–8 (5–7)	Blow Gymnasium; Williamsburg, VA
*		at Boston University	L 61–71	8–9	Boston, MA
*		at American International	W 61–35	9–9	Springfield, MA
2/24/1948		Washington & Lee	W 71–47	10–9 (6–7)	Blow Gymnasium; Williamsburg, VA
		at VMI	W 53–52	11–9 (7–7)	Cormack Field House; Lexington, VA
2/28/1948		Richmond	W 52–47	12–9 (8–7)	Blow Gymnasium; Williamsburg, VA
1948 Southern Conference Tournament
3/2/1948		vs. Wake Forest; First Round	W 61–56	13–9	Duke Indoor Stadium; Durham, NC
3/3/1948		vs. NC State; Quarterfinals	L 52–73	13–10	Duke Indoor Stadium; Durham, NC
*Non-conference game. ^{#}Rankings from AP Poll. (#) Tournament seedings in parentheses.
