= 1948–49 William & Mary Indians men's basketball team =

American college basketball season

1948–49 William & Mary Indians men's basketball

Cincinnati Invitational Tournament
- Conference: Southern Conference
- Record: 24–10 (10–3 SoCon)
- Head coach: Barney Wilson (2nd season)
- Home arena: Blow Gymnasium

1948–49 Southern Conference men's basketball standings
	Conf.				Overall
Team	W		L	PCT	W		L	PCT
No. 13 North Carolina State†	14	–	1	.933	25	–	8	.758
William & Mary	10	–	3	.769	24	–	10	.706
North Carolina	13	–	5	.722	20	–	8	.714
George Washington	9	–	4	.692	18	–	8	.692
Davidson	11	–	6	.647	18	–	8	.692
South Carolina	7	–	6	.538	10	–	12	.455
Wake Forest	7	–	7	.500	11	–	13	.458
Maryland	7	–	7	.500	9	–	17	.346
Virginia Tech	6	–	8	.429	10	–	13	.435
Duke	5	–	7	.417	13	–	9	.591
Clemson	6	–	9	.400	10	–	11	.476
Washington and Lee	5	–	9	.357	10	–	12	.455
Richmond	5	–	10	.333	8	–	15	.348
Furman	4	–	11	.267	8	–	14	.364
VMI	3	–	8	.273	3	–	16	.158
The Citadel	0	–	11	.000	1	–	17	.056
† Southern Conference Tournament winner Rankings from AP Poll

The 1948–49 William & Mary Indians men's basketball team represented the College of William & Mary in intercollegiate basketball during the 1948–49 NCAA men's basketball season. Under the second year of head coach Barney Wilson, the team finished the season 24–10 and 10–3 in the Southern Conference, the most wins in program history. This was the 44th season of the collegiate basketball program at William & Mary, whose nickname is now the Tribe. William & Mary played its home games at Blow Gymnasium.

The Indians finished in 2nd place in the conference and qualified for the 1949 Southern Conference men's basketball tournament, hosted by Duke University at the Duke Indoor Stadium in Durham, North Carolina, where the Indians defeated Davidson in the quarterfinals before losing a triple overtime game against George Washington in the semifinals.

However, William & Mary was invited to participate in the 1949 Cincinnati Invitational Tournament, where the Indians lost against both Xavier and La Salle.

== Program notes ==
- With 24 wins, 1948–49 remains William & Mary's winningest season in program history. The next best seasons for the Indians/Tribe came in 1949–50 (23 wins) and 2009–10 (22 wins).
- This was the first 20 win season in program history. The Indians would record 20 wins again during both subsequent seasons under head coach Barney Wilson. Wilson would go on to record the highest career winning percentage of any William & Mary men's basketball coach.
- The Indians played six teams for the first time this season: Milligan, Albright, Rider, Towson, Baltimore, and La Salle.
- The Indians played their first ever game against a ranked opponent when they lost to #17 NC State on February 5, 1949.
- William & Mary's triple overtime loss to George Washington in the Southern Conference tournament remains tied with 6 other games (from 1958, 1961, 1981, 2008, and 2009) for the longest game in school history.
- William & Mary's appearance in the Cincinnati Invitational Tournament was the program's first ever postseason tournament bid.

== Schedule ==
1948–49 Southern Conference men's basketball standings
	Conf.				Overall
Team	W		L	PCT	W		L	PCT
No. 13 North Carolina State†	14	–	1	.933	25	–	8	.758
William & Mary	10	–	3	.769	24	–	10	.706
North Carolina	13	–	5	.722	20	–	8	.714
George Washington	9	–	4	.692	18	–	8	.692
Davidson	11	–	6	.647	18	–	8	.692
South Carolina	7	–	6	.538	10	–	12	.455
Wake Forest	7	–	7	.500	11	–	13	.458
Maryland	7	–	7	.500	9	–	17	.346
Virginia Tech	6	–	8	.429	10	–	13	.435
Duke	5	–	7	.417	13	–	9	.591
Clemson	6	–	9	.400	10	–	11	.476
Washington and Lee	5	–	9	.357	10	–	12	.455
Richmond	5	–	10	.333	8	–	15	.348
Furman	4	–	11	.267	8	–	14	.364
VMI	3	–	8	.273	3	–	16	.158
The Citadel	0	–	11	.000	1	–	17	.056
† Southern Conference Tournament winner Rankings from AP Poll

Date time, TV	Rank^{#}	Opponent^{#}	Result	Record	Site city, state
Regular season
*		Langley Field	W 80–29	1–0	Blow Gymnasium; Williamsburg, VA
*		Quantico Marines	W 55–50	2–0	Blow Gymnasium; Williamsburg, VA
*		Norfolk NAS	W 68–46	3–0	Blow Gymnasium; Williamsburg, VA
*		Milligan	W 55–45	4–0	Blow Gymnasium; Williamsburg, VA
		at VMI	W 77–54	5–0 (1–0)	Cormack Field House; Lexington, VA
*		Norfolk Naval Base	W 75–46	6–0	Blow Gymnasium; Williamsburg, VA
		Wake Forest	W 52–47	7–0 (2–0)	Blow Gymnasium; Williamsburg, VA
*		at Rider	W 52–37	8–0	Lawrenceville, NJ
*		at Villanova	L 48–70	8–1	Villanova Field House; Villanova, PA
*		at Albright	W 73–54	9–1	Reading, PA
12/23/1948*		at Seton Hall	L 55–59	9–2	Walsh Gymnasium; South Orange, NJ
*		MSTC at Towson	W 94–31	10–2	Blow Gymnasium; Williamsburg, VA
*		Georgetown	W 69–58	11–2	Blow Gymnasium; Williamsburg, VA
		VMI	W 75–37	12–2 (3–0)	Blow Gymnasium; Williamsburg, VA
1/11/1949*		Baltimore	W 96–28	13–2	Blow Gymnasium; Williamsburg, VA
		at Washington & Lee	W 42–39	14–2 (4–0)	Doremus Gymnasium; Lexington, VA
		at VPI	L 52–54	14–3 (4–1)	War Memorial Gymnasium; Blacksburg, VA
*		Hampden–Sydney	W 67–56	15–3	Blow Gymnasium; Williamsburg, VA
		at North Carolina	L 61–69	15–4 (4–2)	Woollen Gymnasium; Chapel Hill, NC
*		Little Creek	W 70–26	16–4	Blow Gymnasium; Williamsburg, VA
		VPI	W 62–47	17–4 (5–2)	Blow Gymnasium; Williamsburg, VA
2/2/1949		No. 17 NC State	L 52–66	17–5 (5–3)	Blow Gymnasium; Williamsburg, VA
2/7/1949		Furman	W 73–60	18–5 (6–3)	Blow Gymnasium; Williamsburg, VA
2/9/1949		Richmond	W 61–47	19–5 (7–3)	Blow Gymnasium; Williamsburg, VA
*		Roanoke	W 77–45	20–5	Blow Gymnasium; Williamsburg, VA
*		at Quantico Marines	L 36–42	20–6	Quantico, VA
2/18/1949		The Citadel	W 57–39	21–6 (8–3)	Blow Gymnasium; Williamsburg, VA
2/24/1948		Washington & Lee	W 89–46	22–6 (9–3)	Blow Gymnasium; Williamsburg, VA
*		at Virginia	L 44–58	22–7	Memorial Gymnasium; Charlottesville, VA
2/26/1949		at Richmond	W 82–53	23–7 (10–3)	Blues Armory; Richmond, VA
1949 Southern Conference Tournament
3/2/1949		vs. Davidson; Quarterfinals	W 54–50	24–7	Duke Indoor Stadium; Durham, NC
3/3/1949		vs. George Washington; Semifinals	L 74–78 ^{3OT}	24–8	Duke Indoor Stadium; Durham, NC
1949 Cincinnati Invitational Tournament
3/7/1949		vs. Xavier	L 65–82	24–9	Cincinnati, OH
3/9/1949		vs. La Salle	L 51–63	24–10	Cincinnati, OH
*Non-conference game. ^{#}Rankings from AP Poll. (#) Tournament seedings in parentheses.
