= 1942–43 William & Mary Indians men's basketball team =

American college basketball season

1942–43 William & Mary Indians men's basketball
- Conference: Southern Conference
- Record: 11–10 (6–4 SoCon)
- Head coach: Dwight Steussey (4th season)
- Home arena: Blow Gymnasium

The 1942–43 William & Mary Indians men's basketball team represented the College of William & Mary in intercollegiate basketball during the 1942–43 NCAA men's basketball season. Under the fourth, and final, year of head coach Dwight Steussey, the team finished the season 11–10 and 6–4 in the Southern Conference. This was the 38th season of the collegiate basketball program at William & Mary, whose nickname is now the Tribe.

The Indians finished in 6th place in the conference and qualified for the 1943 Southern Conference men's basketball tournament, hosted by North Carolina State University at the Thompson Gym in Raleigh, North Carolina, where they lost in the first round to George Washington.

== Schedule ==
1942–43 Southern Conference men's basketball standings
	Conf.				Overall
Team	W		L	PCT	W		L	PCT
Duke	12	–	1	.923	20	–	6	.769
George Washington †	8	–	2	.800	17	–	6	.739
South Carolina	6	–	3	.667	13	–	6	.684
Davidson	7	–	4	.636	18	–	6	.750
The Citadel	5	–	3	.625	8	–	5	.615
William & Mary	6	–	4	.600	11	–	10	.524
VMI	7	–	5	.583	8	–	8	.500
North Carolina State	7	–	5	.583	7	–	9	.438
Maryland	5	–	5	.500	8	–	8	.500
Richmond	4	–	4	.500	11	–	5	.688
North Carolina	8	–	9	.471	12	–	10	.545
Virginia Tech	3	–	6	.333	7	–	7	.500
Washington and Lee	2	–	10	.167	7	–	12	.368
Wake Forest	1	–	10	.091	1	–	10	.091
Clemson	0	–	10	.000	3	–	13	.188
† Southern Conference Tournament winner

Date time, TV	Rank^{#}	Opponent^{#}	Result	Record	Site city, state
Regular season
*		Randolph–Macon	W 58–38	1–0	Blow Gymnasium; Williamsburg, VA
*		at Apprentice School	L 46–60	1–1	Newport News, VA
		at VMI	L 38–41	1–2 (0–1)	Cormack Field House; Lexington, VA
		at VPI	L 34–49	1–3 (0–2)	War Memorial Gymnasium; Blacksburg, VA
		at Washington and Lee	W 34–33	2–3 (1–2)	Doremus Gymnasium; Lexington, VA
1/12/1943		Richmond	W 40–27	3–3 (2–2)	Blow Gymnasium; Williamsburg, VA
*		Hampden–Sydney	W 57–28	4–3	Blow Gymnasium; Williamsburg, VA
*		Apprentice School	W 45–41	5–3	Blow Gymnasium; Williamsburg, VA
2/2/1943		at Richmond	W 40–20	6–3 (3–2)	Millhiser Gymnasium; Richmond, VA
*		Hampden–Sydney	W 48–38	7–3	Blow Gymnasium; Williamsburg, VA
		George Washington	W 53–51	8–3 (4–2)	Blow Gymnasium; Williamsburg, VA
		VPI	W 55–25	9–3 (5–2)	Blow Gymnasium; Williamsburg, VA
*		Norfolk NAS	L 34–65	9–4	Blow Gymnasium; Williamsburg, VA
*		Fort Eustis	W 50–43	10–4	Blow Gymnasium; Williamsburg, VA
		VMI	L 33–41	10–5 (5–3)	Blow Gymnasium; Williamsburg, VA
		Washington and Lee	W 52–42	11–5 (6–3)	Blow Gymnasium; Williamsburg, VA
2/23/1943		at Maryland	L 36–51	11–6 (6–4)	Ritchie Coliseum; College Park, MD
2/24/1943*		at Navy	L 30–57	11–7	Dahlgren Hall; Annapolis, MD
*		at Randolph–Macon	L 52–54	11–8	Ashland, VA
*		Norfolk NTS	L 34–62	11–9	Blow Gymnasium; Williamsburg, VA
1943 Southern Conference Tournament
3/4/1943		vs. George Washington; Quarterfinals	L 23–49	11–10	Thompson Gym; Raleigh, NC
*Non-conference game. ^{#}Rankings from AP Poll. (#) Tournament seedings in parentheses.
