= 1946–47 Duke Blue Devils men's basketball team =

American college basketball season

1946–47 Duke Blue Devils men's basketball
- Conference: Southern Conference
- Record: 19–8 (10–4 Southern)
- Head coach: Gerry Gerard
- Home arena: Duke Indoor Stadium

1946–47 Southern Conference men's basketball standings
	Conf.				Overall
Team	W		L	PCT	W		L	PCT
North Carolina State †	11	–	2	.846	26	–	5	.839
North Carolina	10	–	2	.833	19	–	8	.704
Duke	10	–	4	.714	19	–	8	.704
George Washington	9	–	4	.692	21	–	7	.750
Maryland	9	–	5	.643	14	–	10	.583
Richmond	8	–	5	.615	17	–	9	.654
South Carolina	7	–	5	.583	16	–	9	.640
Washington and Lee	7	–	6	.538	16	–	7	.696
Davidson	7	–	7	.500	17	–	8	.680
William & Mary	6	–	6	.500	14	–	12	.538
Wake Forest	8	–	9	.471	11	–	13	.458
Furman	5	–	7	.417	9	–	10	.474
Virginia Tech	4	–	9	.308	13	–	13	.500
Clemson	2	–	12	.143	7	–	13	.350
The Citadel	1	–	11	.083	5	–	11	.313
VMI	1	–	11	.083	2	–	14	.125
† Southern Conference Tournament winner

The 1946–47 Duke Blue Devils men's basketball team represented Duke University during the 1946–47 men's college basketball season. The head coach was Gerry Gerard, coaching his fifth season with the Blue Devils. The team finished with an overall record of 19–8.
