= 1940–41 William & Mary Indians men's basketball team =

American college basketball season

1940–41 William & Mary Indians men's basketball
- Conference: Southern Conference
- Record: 15–10 (8–3 SoCon)
- Head coach: Dwight Steussey (2nd season)
- Home arena: Blow Gymnasium

The 1940–41 William & Mary Indians men's basketball team represented the College of William & Mary in intercollegiate basketball during the 1940–41 season. Under the second year of head coach Dwight Steussey, the team finished the season 15–10 and 8–3 in the Southern Conference. This was the 36th season of the collegiate basketball program at William & Mary, whose nickname is now the Tribe.

The Indians finished in a tie for 2nd place in the conference and qualified for the 1941 Southern Conference men's basketball tournament at Thompson Gym in Raleigh, North Carolina. This was the Indians' first-ever conference tournament appearance. Additionally, the team recorded the program's first-ever conference tournament victory with a win over Wake Forest in the first round. However, the Indians lost to Duke, the eventual champions, in the semifinals.

The Indians played several teams for the first time this season, including Xavier, Miami (OH), and Bradley.

== Schedule ==
1940–41 Southern Conference men's basketball standings
	Conf.				Overall
Team	W		L	PCT	W		L	PCT
North Carolina	14	–	1	.933	19	–	9	.679
South Carolina	8	–	3	.727	15	–	9	.625
William & Mary	8	–	3	.727	15	–	10	.600
Washington and Lee	9	–	4	.692	11	–	11	.500
Duke †	8	–	4	.667	14	–	8	.636
VMI	8	–	4	.667	10	–	6	.625
Richmond	7	–	5	.583	11	–	10	.524
Wake Forest	7	–	6	.538	9	–	9	.500
Clemson	7	–	8	.467	8	–	14	.364
Davidson	5	–	7	.417	11	–	12	.478
North Carolina State	6	–	9	.400	6	–	9	.400
Virginia Tech	4	–	8	.333	8	–	13	.381
The Citadel	1	–	8	.111	5	–	13	.278
Furman	1	–	10	.091	4	–	13	.235
Maryland	0	–	13	.000	1	–	21	.045
† Southern Conference Tournament winner

Date time, TV	Rank^{#}	Opponent^{#}	Result	Record	Site city, state
Regular season
*		at Langley Field	W 36–33	1–0	Hampton, VA
*		at Apprentice School	W 47–33	2–0	Newport News, VA
12/17/1940		Clemson	W 33–22	3–0 (1–0)	Blow Gymnasium; Williamsburg, VA
*		Xavier	L 50–61	3–1	Blow Gymnasium; Williamsburg, VA
12/20/1940*		at Miami (OH)	L 40–43	3–2	Withrow Court; Oxford, OH
*		at Bradley	L 36–59	3–3	Peoria, IL
*		Randolph–Macon	W 63–46	4–3	Blow Gymnasium; Williamsburg, VA
		VMI	W 43–35	5–3 (2–0)	Blow Gymnasium; Williamsburg, VA
		at VPI	W 54–51	6–3 (3–0)	War Memorial Gymnasium; Blacksburg, VA
		at Washington and Lee	L 29–35	6–4 (3–1)	Doremus Gymnasium; Lexington, VA
*		Hampden–Sydney	W 44–26	7–4	Blow Gymnasium; Williamsburg, VA
*		at Virginia	L 32–48	7–5	Memorial Gymnasium; Charlottesville, VA
		VMI	L 36–43	7–6 (3–2)	Blow Gymnasium; Williamsburg, VA
*		at Randolph–Macon	W 43–36	8–6	Ashland, VA
2/3/1941		Richmond	W 37–32	9–6 (4–2)	Blow Gymnasium; Williamsburg, VA
2/7/1941		Furman	W 47–37	10–6 (5–2)	Blow Gymnasium; Williamsburg, VA
		VPI	W 52–50	11–6 (6–2)	Blow Gymnasium; Williamsburg, VA
*		Virginia	L 40–41	11–7	Blow Gymnasium; Williamsburg, VA
2/14/1941		at Maryland	W 58–40	12–7 (7–2)	Ritchie Coliseum; College Park, MD
2/15/1941*		at Navy	L 32–51	12–8	Annapolis, MD
*		Hampden–Sydney	W 47–39	13–8	Blow Gymnasium; Williamsburg, VA
2/20/1941		at Richmond	L 41–46	13–9 (7–3)	Millhiser Gymnasium; Richmond, VA
		Washington and Lee	W 34–32 ^{OT}	14–9 (8–3)	Blow Gymnasium; Williamsburg, VA
Southern Conference Tournament
2/27/1941		vs. Wake Forest; Quarterfinals	W 52–34	15–9	Thompson Gym; Raleigh, NC
2/28/1941		vs. Duke; Semifinals	L 42–57	15–10	Thompson Gym; Raleigh, NC
*Non-conference game. ^{#}Rankings from AP Poll. (#) Tournament seedings in parentheses.
