= 1944–45 Duke Blue Devils men's basketball team =

American college basketball season

1944–45 Duke Blue Devils men's basketball
- Conference: Southern Conference
- Record: 13–9 (6–1 Southern)
- Head coach: Gerry Gerard
- Home arena: Duke Indoor Stadium

1944–45 Southern Conference men's basketball standings
	Conf.				Overall
Team	W		L	PCT	W		L	PCT
South Carolina	9	–	0	1.000	19	–	3	.864
Richmond	2	–	0	1.000	3	–	4	.429
Duke	6	–	1	.857	13	–	9	.591
North Carolina †	11	–	3	.786	22	–	6	.786
The Citadel	8	–	4	.667	16	–	7	.696
North Carolina State	7	–	5	.583	10	–	11	.476
William & Mary	3	–	4	.429	7	–	11	.389
Clemson	3	–	5	.375	8	–	8	.500
Maryland	2	–	5	.286	2	–	14	.125
Virginia Tech	1	–	3	.250	6	–	8	.429
Davidson	2	–	7	.222	9	–	9	.500
VMI	1	–	4	.200	2	–	10	.167
Wake Forest	0	–	6	.000	3	–	14	.176
Furman	0	–	8	.000	2	–	15	.118
† Southern Conference Tournament winner

The 1944–45 Duke Blue Devils men's basketball team represented Duke University during the 1944–45 men's college basketball season. The head coach was Gerry Gerard, coaching his third season with the Blue Devils. The team finished with an overall record of 13–9.
