= 1939–40 William & Mary Indians men's basketball team =

American college basketball season

1939–40 William & Mary Indians men's basketball
- Conference: Southern Conference
- Record: 13–10 (6–5 SoCon)
- Head coach: Dwight Steussey (1st season)
- Home arena: Blow Gymnasium

The 1939–40 William & Mary Indians men's basketball team represented the College of William & Mary in intercollegiate basketball during the 1939–40 season. Under the first year of head coach Dwight Steussey, the team finished the season 13–10 and 6–5 in the Southern Conference. This was the 35th season of the collegiate basketball program at William & Mary, whose nickname is now the Tribe.

The Indians finished in a tie for 8th in the conference and did not quality for the 1940 Southern Conference men's basketball tournament.

William & Mary played its first overtime game in program history in February 1940 against Washington and Lee in a 33–36 loss. Additionally, the Indians played several teams for the first time this season, including St. Francis (NY), Seton Hall, The Citadel, and Furman.

== Schedule ==
1939–40 Southern Conference men's basketball standings
	Conf.				Overall
Team	W		L	PCT	W		L	PCT
Duke	13	–	2	.867	19	–	7	.731
North Carolina †	11	–	2	.846	23	–	3	.885
Washington and Lee	7	–	3	.700	13	–	5	.722
Wake Forest	10	–	5	.667	13	–	9	.591
Maryland	7	–	5	.583	14	–	9	.609
Clemson	9	–	7	.563	9	–	12	.429
Richmond	5	–	4	.556	11	–	6	.647
The Citadel	6	–	5	.545	8	–	9	.471
William & Mary	6	–	5	.545	12	–	11	.522
Furman	4	–	6	.400	11	–	11	.500
North Carolina State	5	–	10	.333	8	–	11	.421
Davidson	4	–	11	.267	8	–	13	.381
South Carolina	3	–	10	.231	5	–	13	.278
VMI	2	–	9	.182	3	–	12	.200
Virginia Tech	1	–	9	.100	4	–	15	.211
† Southern Conference Tournament winner

Date time, TV	Rank^{#}	Opponent^{#}	Result	Record	Site city, state
Regular season
*		at Norfolk NTS	L 44–46	0–1	Norfolk, Virginia
*		Newport News Apprentice School	W 50–37	1–1	Blow Gymnasium; Williamsburg, Virginia
*		at Randolph–Macon	W 33–22	2–1	Ashland, Virginia
*		at Langley Field	W 62–50	3–1	Hampton, Virginia
*		Norfolk NTS	W 55–44	4–1	Blow Gymnasium; Williamsburg, Virginia
*		at Panser	L 44–50	4–2	
*		at St. Francis (NY)	W 32–28	5–2	Park Slope Armory; Brooklyn, New York
1/8/1940*		at Seton Hall	L 35–51	5–3	Walsh Gymnasium; South Orange, New Jersey
1/10/1940		at Richmond	L 33–35	5–4 (0–1)	Millhiser Gymnasium; Richmond, Virginia
*		at Virginia	L 31–49	5–5	Memorial Gymnasium; Charlottesville, Virginia
		at The Citadel	L 35–36	5–6 (0–2)	The Citadel Armory; Charleston, South Carolina
1/29/1940		at Furman	W 47–37	6–6 (1–2)	Greenville, South Carolina
		VPI	W 38–33	7–6 (2–2)	Blow Gymnasium; Williamsburg, Virginia
		at NC State	L 29–36	7–7 (2–3)	Thompson Gym; Raleigh, North Carolina
*		Virginia	W 29–28	8–7	Blow Gymnasium; Williamsburg, Virginia
*		Hampden–Sydney	W 42–31	9–7	Blow Gymnasium; Williamsburg, Virginia
		at Washington and Lee	L 39–49	9–8 (2–4)	Doremus Gymnasium; Lexington, Virginia
		at VPI	W 49–29	10–8 (3–4)	War Memorial Gymnasium; Blacksburg, Virginia
		at VMI	W 50–48	11–8 (4–4)	Cormack Field House; Lexington, Virginia
2/19/1940		Richmond	W 43–38	12–8 (5–4)	Blow Gymnasium; Williamsburg, Virginia
		Washington and Lee	L 33–36 ^{OT}	12–9 (5–5)	Blow Gymnasium; Williamsburg, Virginia
		VMI	W 59–36	13–9 (6–5)	Blow Gymnasium; Williamsburg, Virginia
2/24/1940*		at Navy	L 46–52	13–10	Annapolis, Maryland
*Non-conference game. ^{#}Rankings from AP Poll. (#) Tournament seedings in parentheses.
