= 1943–44 Duke Blue Devils men's basketball team =

American college basketball season

1943–44 Duke Blue Devils men's basketball

SoCon Tournament champions
- Conference: Southern Conference
- Record: 13–13 (4–2 Southern)
- Head coach: Gerry Gerard
- Home arena: Duke Indoor Stadium

1943–44 Southern Conference men's basketball standings
	Conf.				Overall
Team	W		L	PCT	W		L	PCT
North Carolina	9	–	1	.900	17	–	10	.630
Virginia Tech	4	–	1	.800	11	–	4	.733
Duke †	4	–	2	.667	13	–	13	.500
Maryland	2	–	1	.667	4	–	14	.222
Richmond	2	–	2	.500	7	–	6	.538
Davidson	3	–	4	.429	16	–	7	.696
South Carolina	1	–	2	.333	13	–	2	.867
Clemson	1	–	2	.333	1	–	10	.091
North Carolina State	2	–	5	.286	5	–	13	.278
William & Mary	1	–	3	.250	10	–	11	.476
The Citadel	0	–	1	.000	2	–	3	.400
VMI	0	–	5	.000	0	–	14	.000
† Southern Conference Tournament winner

The 1943–44 Duke Blue Devils men's basketball team represented Duke University during the 1943–44 men's college basketball season. The head coach was Gerry Gerard, coaching his second season with the Blue Devils. The team finished with an overall record of 13–13.
