= Cutting down the nets =

Celebratory tradition in basketball

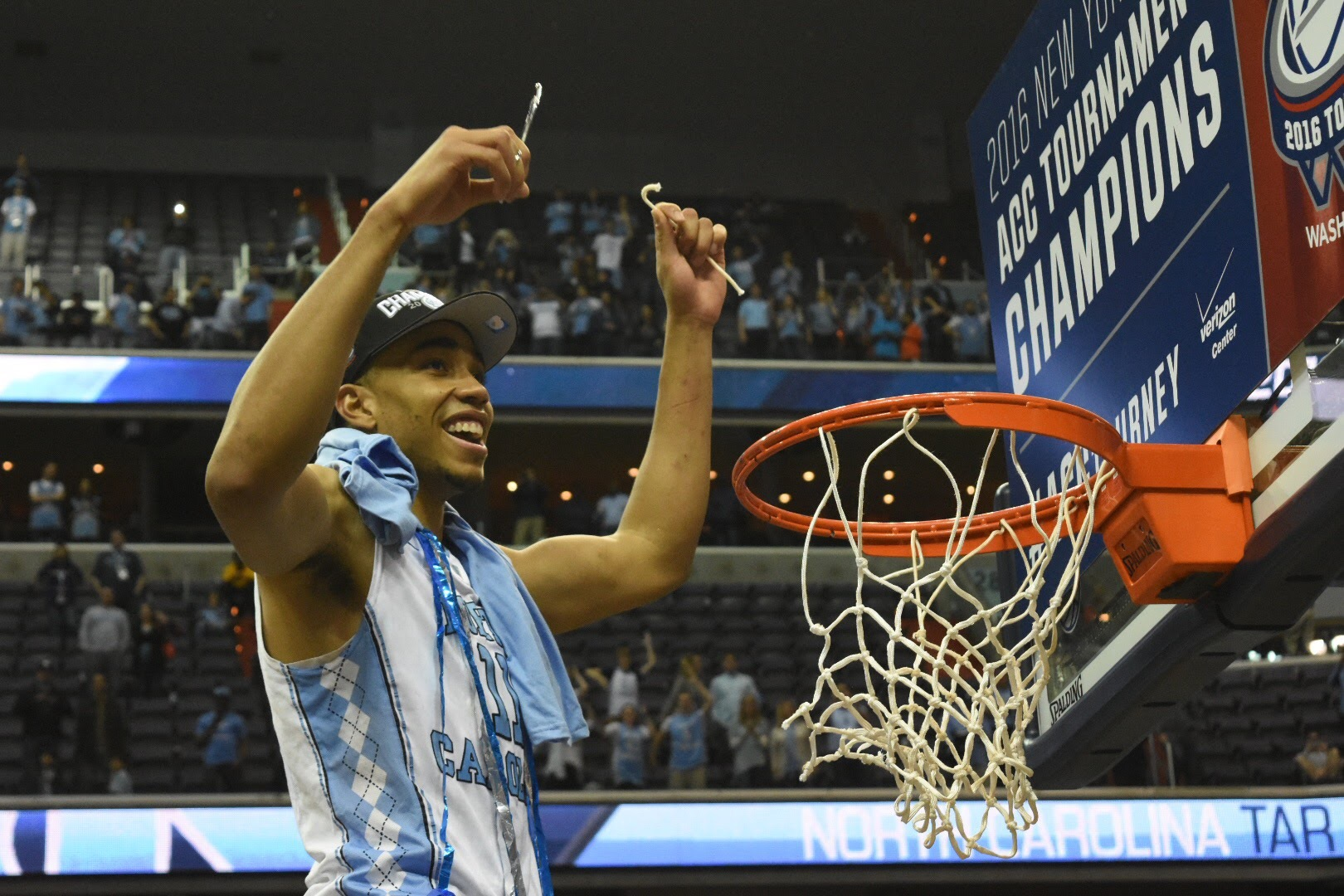
Brice Johnson cuts down the nets after winning the 2016 ACC tournament with North Carolina.

Cutting down the nets is a celebratory tradition in basketball wherein a coach or player removes the net from one of the backboards after winning a game. In college basketball in the United States, it is usually done after winning a conference tournament, regional title, or national championship game.

== History ==
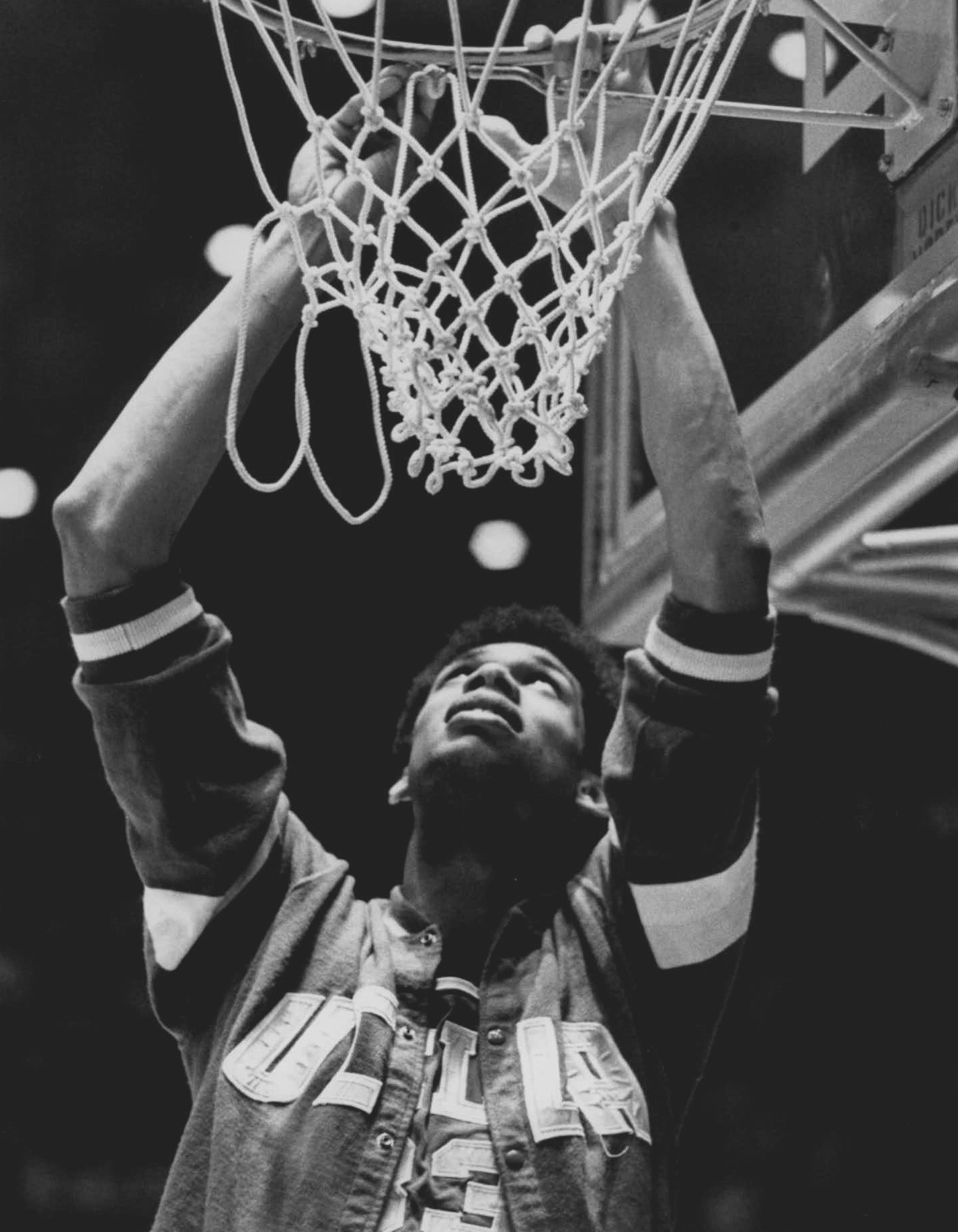
Kareem Abdul-Jabbar (then known as Lew Alcindor) cuts down the nets after winning the 1969 NCAA Championship with UCLA.

Sports historians believe the tradition of cutting the nets first started in Indiana high school basketball in the 1920s and 1930s. The tradition first came to men's college basketball in 1947, when the NC State Wolfpack won the Southern Conference Championship. Following the tournament win, Wolfpack coach Everett Case had his players hoist him up so he could cut down the net to keep as a souvenir. Case had previously coached in Indiana, where he had cut down the nets on four occasions. The tradition then began to spread to the rest of college basketball.

In the 1980s, NC State coach Jim Valvano was said to have his players practice cutting down the nets in order to mentally condition them to be winners. Valvano's Wolfpack team went on an unlikely run as a 6-seed to win the 1983 NCAA tournament.

In 2008, Werner Co., a ladder manufacturer, began sponsoring the NCAA tournament and providing all the ladders used for cutting down the nets in the tournament.

== In other countries ==
=== Canada ===
The tradition is also practiced in Canadian university basketball.

=== Philippines ===
In the Philippine Basketball Association, the tradition of cutting the nets has been performed since the league's establishment in 1975. This is usually done before the champion team is awarded with the championship trophy. This ritual is also followed by collegiate leagues UAAP and NCAA.

== See also ==
- Gatorade shower
