= 1946–47 William & Mary Indians men's basketball team =

American college basketball season

1946–47 William & Mary Indians men's basketball
- Conference: Southern Conference
- Record: 14–12 (6–6 SoCon)
- Head coach: Richard F. Gallagher (1st season)
- Home arena: Blow Gymnasium

1946–47 Southern Conference men's basketball standings
	Conf.				Overall
Team	W		L	PCT	W		L	PCT
North Carolina State †	11	–	2	.846	26	–	5	.839
North Carolina	10	–	2	.833	19	–	8	.704
Duke	10	–	4	.714	19	–	8	.704
George Washington	9	–	4	.692	21	–	7	.750
Maryland	9	–	5	.643	14	–	10	.583
Richmond	8	–	5	.615	17	–	9	.654
South Carolina	7	–	5	.583	16	–	9	.640
Washington and Lee	7	–	6	.538	16	–	7	.696
Davidson	7	–	7	.500	17	–	8	.680
William & Mary	6	–	6	.500	14	–	12	.538
Wake Forest	8	–	9	.471	11	–	13	.458
Furman	5	–	7	.417	9	–	10	.474
Virginia Tech	4	–	9	.308	13	–	13	.500
Clemson	2	–	12	.143	7	–	13	.350
The Citadel	1	–	11	.083	5	–	11	.313
VMI	1	–	11	.083	2	–	14	.125
† Southern Conference Tournament winner

The 1946–47 William & Mary Indians men's basketball team represented the College of William & Mary in intercollegiate basketball during the 1946–47 NCAA men's basketball season. Under the only year of head coach Richard F. Gallagher (who concurrently served as the head baseball coach), the team finished the season 14–12 and 6–6 in the Southern Conference. This was the 42nd season of the collegiate basketball program at William & Mary, whose nickname is now the Tribe. William & Mary played its home games at Blow Gymnasium.

The Indians finished in 9th place in the conference and failed to qualify for the 1947 Southern Conference men's basketball tournament.

The Indians played three teams for the first time this season: American, Penn, and Boston University.

== Schedule ==
Date time, TV	Rank^{#}	Opponent^{#}	Result	Record	Site city, state
Regular season
*		at Langley Field	W 66–34	1–0	Hampton, VA
*		Camp Lee	W 66–44	2–0	Blow Gymnasium; Williamsburg, VA
*		American	W 48–44	3–0	Blow Gymnasium; Williamsburg, VA
*		at Navy	W 45–37	3–1	Dahlgren Hall; Annapolis, MD
*		at Penn	W 45–37	3–2	The Palestra; Philadelphia, PA
*		at Seton Hall	L 33–65	3–3	Walsh Gymnasium; South Orange, NJ
*		at Merchant Marine	L 35–50	3–4	Kings Point, NY
		Wake Forest	L 33–40	3–5 (0–1)	Blow Gymnasium; Williamsburg, VA
*		Virginia	W 59–40	4–5	Blow Gymnasium; Williamsburg, VA
1/11/1947		at Richmond	W 47–45	5–5 (1–1)	Millhiser Gymnasium; Richmond, VA
*		Roanoke College	W 68–32	6–5	Blow Gymnasium; Williamsburg, VA
*		at Virginia	L 46–52	6–6	Memorial Gymnasium; Charlottesville, VA
1/18/1947		Richmond	L 34–40	6–7 (1–2)	Blow Gymnasium; Williamsburg, VA
		VPI	W 50–41	7–7 (2–2)	Blow Gymnasium; Williamsburg, VA
2/3/1947		at Duke	L 45–69	7–8 (2–3)	Duke Indoor Stadium; Durham, NC
2/4/1947		at NC State	L 33–45	7–9 (2–4)	Thompson Gym; Raleigh, NC
*		Hampden–Sydney	W 46–40	8–9	Blow Gymnasium; Williamsburg, VA
		George Washington	W 37–32	9–9 (3–4)	Blow Gymnasium; Williamsburg, VA
*		Newport News Air Station	W 66–37	10–9	Blow Gymnasium; Williamsburg, VA
		at VMI	W 63–56	11–9 (4–4)	Cormack Field House; Lexington, VA
		at VPI	L 52–56	11–10 (4–5)	War Memorial Gymnasium; Blacksburg, VA
		Washington & Lee	L 56–61	11–11 (4–6)	Blow Gymnasium; Williamsburg, VA
*		at Newport News Air Station	W 55–52	12–11	Newport News, VA
		VMI	W 66–32	13–11 (5–6)	Blow Gymnasium; Williamsburg, VA
2/25/1947*		at Boston University	L 45–62	13–12	Boston, MA
		Washington & Lee	W 58–37	14–12 (6–6)	Blow Gymnasium; Williamsburg, VA
*Non-conference game. ^{#}Rankings from AP Poll. (#) Tournament seedings in parentheses.
