= 1945 Southern Conference men's basketball tournament =

- Classification: Division I
- Teams: 8
- Site: Thompson Gym; Raleigh, NC
- Champions: North Carolina (8th title)
- Winning coach: Ben Carnevale (1st title)

1944–45 Southern Conference men's basketball standings
	Conf.				Overall
Team	W		L	PCT	W		L	PCT
South Carolina	9	–	0	1.000	19	–	3	.864
Richmond	2	–	0	1.000	3	–	4	.429
Duke	6	–	1	.857	13	–	9	.591
North Carolina †	11	–	3	.786	22	–	6	.786
The Citadel	8	–	4	.667	16	–	7	.696
North Carolina State	7	–	5	.583	10	–	11	.476
William & Mary	3	–	4	.429	7	–	11	.389
Clemson	3	–	5	.375	8	–	8	.500
Maryland	2	–	5	.286	2	–	14	.125
Virginia Tech	1	–	3	.250	6	–	8	.429
Davidson	2	–	7	.222	9	–	9	.500
VMI	1	–	4	.200	2	–	10	.167
Wake Forest	0	–	6	.000	3	–	14	.176
Furman	0	–	8	.000	2	–	15	.118
† Southern Conference Tournament winner

The 1945 Southern Conference men's basketball tournament took place from February 22–24, 1945 at Thompson Gym in Raleigh, North Carolina. The North Carolina Tar Heels won their eighth Southern Conference title, led by head coach Ben Carnevale.

== Format ==
The top eight finishers of the conference's fourteen members were eligible for the tournament. Teams were seeded based on conference winning percentage. The tournament used a preset bracket consisting of three rounds.

== Bracket ==
Quarterfinals; February 22
South Carolina	55'
Clemson	24
North Carolina	55
NC State	28
Duke	76
Maryland	49
William & Mary	54
The Citadel	41

Semifinals; February 23
North Carolina	39
South Carolina	26
Duke	59
William & Mary	22

Finals; February 24
North Carolina	49
Duke	48

* Overtime game

== See also ==
- List of Southern Conference men's basketball champions
