= 1943–44 William & Mary Indians men's basketball team =

American college basketball season

1943–44 William & Mary Indians men's basketball
- Conference: Southern Conference
- Record: 10–11 (1–3 SoCon)
- Head coach: Rube McCray (1st season)
- Home arena: Blow Gymnasium

1943–44 Southern Conference men's basketball standings
| | Conf. | | | | Overall |
| Team | W | | L | PCT | W | | L | PCT |
|---|---|---|---|---|---|---|---|---|
| North Carolina | 9 | – | 1 | .900 | 17 | – | 10 | .630 |
| Virginia Tech | 4 | – | 1 | .800 | 11 | – | 4 | .733 |
| Duke † | 4 | – | 2 | .667 | 13 | – | 13 | .500 |
| Maryland | 2 | – | 1 | .667 | 4 | – | 14 | .222 |
| Richmond | 2 | – | 2 | .500 | 7 | – | 6 | .538 |
| Davidson | 3 | – | 4 | .429 | 16 | – | 7 | .696 |
| South Carolina | 1 | – | 2 | .333 | 13 | – | 2 | .867 |
| Clemson | 1 | – | 2 | .333 | 1 | – | 10 | .091 |
| North Carolina State | 2 | – | 5 | .286 | 5 | – | 13 | .278 |
| William & Mary | 1 | – | 3 | .250 | 10 | – | 11 | .476 |
| The Citadel | 0 | – | 1 | .000 | 2 | – | 3 | .400 |
| VMI | 0 | – | 5 | .000 | 0 | – | 14 | .000 |
† Southern Conference Tournament winner

The 1942–43 William & Mary Indians men's basketball team represented the College of William & Mary in intercollegiate basketball during the 1943–44 NCAA men's basketball season. Under the first year of head coach Rube McCray, the team finished the season 10–11 and 1–3 in the Southern Conference. Due to World War II, the Indians played a reduced conference schedule. This was the 39th season of the collegiate basketball program at William & Mary, whose nickname is now the Tribe.

The Indians finished in 10th place in the conference and qualified for the 1944 Southern Conference men's basketball tournament, hosted by North Carolina State University at the Thompson Gym in Raleigh, North Carolina, where they lost in the first round to Duke.

== Schedule ==
| Date time, TV | Rank^{#} | Opponent^{#} | Result | Record | Site city, state |
Regular season
| * | | Fort Story | W 44–29 | 1–0 | Blow Gymnasium; Williamsburg, VA |
| * | | Wilson General Hospital | W 46–29 | 2–0 | Blow Gymnasium; Williamsburg, VA |
| * | | Camp Patrick Henry | W 53–37 | 3–0 | Blow Gymnasium; Williamsburg, VA |
| * | | Camp Peary | W 100–18 | 4–0 | Blow Gymnasium; Williamsburg, VA |
| * | | Norfolk NTS | L 35–65 | 4–1 | Blow Gymnasium; Williamsburg, VA |
| * | | at Norfolk NAS | L 34–65 | 4–2 | Norfolk, VA |
| * | | Midshipmen School | L 45–59 | 4–3 | Blow Gymnasium; Williamsburg, VA |
| * | | Richmond Air Base | L 40–42 | 4–4 | Blow Gymnasium; Williamsburg, VA |
| * | | at Camp Peary | L 24–52 | 4–5 | Yorktown, VA |
| 1/15/1944 | | at Richmond | W 58–55 ^{OT} | 5–5 (1–0) | Millhiser Gymnasium; Richmond, VA |
| * | | Apprentice School | W 46–40 | 6–5 | Blow Gymnasium; Williamsburg, VA |
| * | | Fort Story | W 39–36 | 7–5 | Blow Gymnasium; Williamsburg, VA |
| * | | Hampden–Sydney | W 47–28 | 8–5 | Blow Gymnasium; Williamsburg, VA |
| | | at VPI | L 22–46 | 8–6 (1–1) | War Memorial Gymnasium; Blacksburg, VA |
| * | | at Hampden–Sydney | L 40–45 | 8–7 | Hampden Sydney, VA |
| * | | at Camp Patrick Henry | L 40–56 | 8–8 | Warwick County, VA |
| 2/18/1944 | | Richmond | L 42–47 | 8–9 (1–2) | Blow Gymnasium; Williamsburg, VA |
| | | VPI | L 29–48 | 8–10 (1–3) | Blow Gymnasium; Williamsburg, VA |
| * | | Cheatham Marines | W 81–39 | 9–10 | Blow Gymnasium; Williamsburg, VA |
| * | | at Apprentice School | W 55–52 | 10–10 | Newport News, VA |
1943 Southern Conference Tournament
| 2/24/1944 | | vs. Duke; Quarterfinals | L 25–68 | 10–11 | Thompson Gym; Raleigh, NC |
*Non-conference game. ^{#}Rankings from AP Poll. (#) Tournament seedings in parentheses.
