= 1940 Southern Conference men's basketball tournament =

- Classification: Division I
- Season: 1939–40
- Teams: 8
- Site: Thompson Gym; Raleigh, NC
- Champions: North Carolina (7th title)
- Winning coach: Bill Lange (1st title)

1939–40 Southern Conference men's basketball standings
| | Conf. | | | | Overall |
| Team | W | | L | PCT | W | | L | PCT |
|---|---|---|---|---|---|---|---|---|
| Duke | 13 | – | 2 | .867 | 19 | – | 7 | .731 |
| North Carolina † | 11 | – | 2 | .846 | 23 | – | 3 | .885 |
| Washington and Lee | 7 | – | 3 | .700 | 13 | – | 5 | .722 |
| Wake Forest | 10 | – | 5 | .667 | 13 | – | 9 | .591 |
| Maryland | 7 | – | 5 | .583 | 14 | – | 9 | .609 |
| Clemson | 9 | – | 7 | .563 | 9 | – | 12 | .429 |
| Richmond | 5 | – | 4 | .556 | 11 | – | 6 | .647 |
| The Citadel | 6 | – | 5 | .545 | 8 | – | 9 | .471 |
| William & Mary | 6 | – | 5 | .545 | 12 | – | 11 | .522 |
| Furman | 4 | – | 6 | .400 | 11 | – | 11 | .500 |
| North Carolina State | 5 | – | 10 | .333 | 8 | – | 11 | .421 |
| Davidson | 4 | – | 11 | .267 | 8 | – | 13 | .381 |
| South Carolina | 3 | – | 10 | .231 | 5 | – | 13 | .278 |
| VMI | 2 | – | 9 | .182 | 3 | – | 12 | .200 |
| Virginia Tech | 1 | – | 9 | .100 | 4 | – | 15 | .211 |
† Southern Conference Tournament winner

The 1940 Southern Conference men's basketball tournament took place from February 29–March 2, 1940, at Thompson Gym in Raleigh, North Carolina. The North Carolina Tar Heels won their seventh Southern Conference title, led by head coach Bill Lange.

== Format ==
The top eight finishers of the conference's fifteen members were eligible for the tournament. Teams were seeded based on conference winning percentage. The tournament used a preset bracket consisting of three rounds.

== Bracket ==
Quarterfinals; February 29
Wake Forest | 40
Richmond | 34
North Carolina | 50
Clemson | 41
Duke | 40
The Citadel | 35
Maryland | 43
Washington and Lee | 30

Semifinals; March 1
Wake Forest | 35
North Carolina | 43
Duke | 44
Maryland | 32

Finals; March 2
North Carolina | 43
Duke | 23

* Overtime game

== See also ==
- List of Southern Conference men's basketball champions
