= 1949 Southern Conference men's basketball tournament =

- Classification: Division I
- Season: 1948–49
- Teams: 8
- Site: Duke Indoor Stadium; Durham, NC
- Champions: NC State (4th title)
- Winning coach: Everett Case (3rd title)
- MVP: Chet Giermak (William & Mary)

1948–49 Southern Conference men's basketball standings
	Conf.				Overall
Team	W		L	PCT	W		L	PCT
No. 13 North Carolina State†	14	–	1	.933	25	–	8	.758
William & Mary	10	–	3	.769	24	–	10	.706
North Carolina	13	–	5	.722	20	–	8	.714
George Washington	9	–	4	.692	18	–	8	.692
Davidson	11	–	6	.647	18	–	8	.692
South Carolina	7	–	6	.538	10	–	12	.455
Wake Forest	7	–	7	.500	11	–	13	.458
Maryland	7	–	7	.500	9	–	17	.346
Virginia Tech	6	–	8	.429	10	–	13	.435
Duke	5	–	7	.417	13	–	9	.591
Clemson	6	–	9	.400	10	–	11	.476
Washington and Lee	5	–	9	.357	10	–	12	.455
Richmond	5	–	10	.333	8	–	15	.348
Furman	4	–	11	.267	8	–	14	.364
VMI	3	–	8	.273	3	–	16	.158
The Citadel	0	–	11	.000	1	–	17	.056
† Southern Conference Tournament winner Rankings from AP Poll

The 1949 Southern Conference men's basketball tournament took place from March 2–4, 1949 at Duke Indoor Stadium in Durham, North Carolina. The North Carolina State Wolfpack won their fourth Southern Conference title, led by head coach Everett Case.

== Format ==
The top eight finishers of the conference's sixteen members were eligible for the tournament. Teams were seeded based on conference winning percentage. The tournament used a preset bracket consisting of three rounds.

== Bracket ==
Quarterfinals; March 2
#15 NC State	64
Wake Forest	42
North Carolina	79
Maryland	61
George Washington	62
South Carolina	45
William & Mary	54
Davidson	50

Semifinals; March 3
#15 NC State	43
North Carolina	40
George Washington	78
William & Mary	74

Finals; March 4
#15 NC State	55
George Washington	39

* Overtime game

== See also ==
- List of Southern Conference men's basketball champions
