= 1944–45 William & Mary Indians men's basketball team =

American college basketball season

1944–45 William & Mary Indians men's basketball
- Conference: Southern Conference
- Record: 7–10 (3–4 SoCon)
- Head coach: Rube McCray (2nd season)
- Home arena: Blow Gymnasium

1944–45 Southern Conference men's basketball standings
	Conf.				Overall
Team	W		L	PCT	W		L	PCT
South Carolina	9	–	0	1.000	19	–	3	.864
Richmond	2	–	0	1.000	3	–	4	.429
Duke	6	–	1	.857	13	–	9	.591
North Carolina †	11	–	3	.786	22	–	6	.786
The Citadel	8	–	4	.667	16	–	7	.696
North Carolina State	7	–	5	.583	10	–	11	.476
William & Mary	3	–	4	.429	7	–	11	.389
Clemson	3	–	5	.375	8	–	8	.500
Maryland	2	–	5	.286	2	–	14	.125
Virginia Tech	1	–	3	.250	6	–	8	.429
Davidson	2	–	7	.222	9	–	9	.500
VMI	1	–	4	.200	2	–	10	.167
Wake Forest	0	–	6	.000	3	–	14	.176
Furman	0	–	8	.000	2	–	15	.118
† Southern Conference Tournament winner

The 1944–45 William & Mary Indians men's basketball team represented the College of William & Mary in intercollegiate basketball during the 1944–45 NCAA men's basketball season. Under the second, and final, year of head coach Rube McCray (who concurrently served as the head football coach), the team finished the season 7–10 and 3–4 in the Southern Conference. This was the 40th season of the collegiate basketball program at William & Mary, whose nickname is now the Tribe.

The Indians finished in 7th place in the conference and qualified for the 1945 Southern Conference men's basketball tournament, hosted by North Carolina State University at the Thompson Gym in Raleigh, North Carolina. William & Mary defeated The Citadel in the quarterfinals before falling to Duke in the semifinal round.

== Schedule ==
Date time, TV	Rank^{#}	Opponent^{#}	Result	Record	Site city, state
Regular season
*		Cheatham Annex	L 31–34	0–1	Blow Gymnasium; Williamsburg, VA
*		Langley Air Base	L 39–47	0–2	Blow Gymnasium; Williamsburg, VA
*		Virginia	W 37–24	1–2	Blow Gymnasium; Williamsburg, VA
*		Cheatham Annex	W 53–33	2–2	Blow Gymnasium; Williamsburg, VA
*		Hampden–Sydney	L 39–41	2–3	Blow Gymnasium; Williamsburg, VA
		NC State	L 37–58	2–4 (0–1)	Blow Gymnasium; Williamsburg, VA
1/12/1945		Richmond	L 37–58	2–5 (0–2)	Blow Gymnasium; Williamsburg, VA
		NC State	W 43–38	3–5 (1–2)	Blow Gymnasium; Williamsburg, VA
		VMI	W 43–24	4–5 (2–2)	Blow Gymnasium; Williamsburg, VA
		North Carolina	L 46–80	4–6 (2–3)	Blow Gymnasium; Williamsburg, VA
		VPI	W 41–30	5–6 (3–3)	Blow Gymnasium; Williamsburg, VA
*		Virginia	L 37–41	5–7	Blow Gymnasium; Williamsburg, VA
*		at Hampden–Sydney	L 38–54	5–8	Blow Gymnasium; Williamsburg, VA
2/17/1945		Maryland	L 46–53	5–9 (3–4)	Blow Gymnasium; Williamsburg, VA
*		Randolph–Macon	W 50–39	6–9	Blow Gymnasium; Williamsburg, VA
1945 Southern Conference Tournament
2/22/1945		vs. The Citadel; Quarterfinals	W 54–41	7–9	Thompson Gym; Raleigh, NC
2/23/1945		vs. Duke; Semifinals	L 32–59	7–10	Thompson Gym; Raleigh, NC
*Non-conference game. ^{#}Rankings from AP Poll. (#) Tournament seedings in parentheses.
