= 1943 Southern Conference men's basketball tournament =

- Classification: Division I
- Teams: 8
- Site: Thompson Gym; Raleigh, NC
- Champions: George Washington (1st title)
- Winning coach: Otis Zahn (1st title)

1942–43 Southern Conference men's basketball standings
	Conf.				Overall
Team	W		L	PCT	W		L	PCT
Duke	12	–	1	.923	20	–	6	.769
George Washington †	8	–	2	.800	17	–	6	.739
South Carolina	6	–	3	.667	13	–	6	.684
Davidson	7	–	4	.636	18	–	6	.750
The Citadel	5	–	3	.625	8	–	5	.615
William & Mary	6	–	4	.600	11	–	10	.524
VMI	7	–	5	.583	8	–	8	.500
North Carolina State	7	–	5	.583	7	–	9	.438
Maryland	5	–	5	.500	8	–	8	.500
Richmond	4	–	4	.500	11	–	5	.688
North Carolina	8	–	9	.471	12	–	10	.545
Virginia Tech	3	–	6	.333	7	–	7	.500
Washington and Lee	2	–	10	.167	7	–	12	.368
Wake Forest	1	–	10	.091	1	–	10	.091
Clemson	0	–	10	.000	3	–	13	.188
† Southern Conference Tournament winner

The 1943 Southern Conference men's basketball tournament took place in March 1943 at Thompson Gym in Raleigh, North Carolina. The George Washington Colonials won their first Southern Conference title, led by head coach Otis Zahn.

== Format ==
The top eight finishers of the conference's fifteen members were eligible for the tournament. Teams were seeded based on conference winning percentage. The tournament used a preset bracket consisting of three rounds.

== Bracket ==
Quarterfinals; March 4
Davidson	33
NC State	30
George Washington	49
William & Mary	23
Duke	57
VMI	41
South Carolina	23
The Citadel	37

Semifinals; March 5
Davidson	40
George Washington	47
Duke	56
The Citadel	37

Finals; March 6
George Washington	56
Duke	40

* Overtime game

== See also ==
- List of Southern Conference men's basketball champions
