= 1947–48 Duke Blue Devils men's basketball team =

American college basketball season

1947–48 Duke Blue Devils men's basketball
- Conference: Southern Conference
- Record: 17–12 (8–6 Southern)
- Head coach: Gerry Gerard
- Home arena: Duke Indoor Stadium

1947–48 Southern Conference men's basketball standings
	Conf.				Overall
Team	W		L	PCT	W		L	PCT
North Carolina State †	12	–	0	1.000	29	–	3	.906
George Washington	13	–	3	.813	19	–	7	.731
North Carolina	11	–	4	.733	20	–	7	.741
Maryland	9	–	6	.600	11	–	14	.440
Davidson	10	–	7	.588	19	–	9	.679
Virginia Tech	7	–	5	.583	14	–	9	.609
Duke	8	–	6	.571	17	–	12	.586
Wake Forest	8	–	7	.533	18	–	11	.621
William & Mary	8	–	7	.533	13	–	10	.565
South Carolina	8	–	7	.533	12	–	11	.522
Washington and Lee	5	–	9	.357	7	–	17	.292
The Citadel	4	–	8	.333	8	–	9	.471
Richmond	4	–	9	.308	8	–	14	.364
Furman	3	–	10	.231	11	–	15	.423
Clemson	3	–	14	.176	6	–	17	.261
VMI	1	–	12	.077	3	–	16	.158
† Southern Conference Tournament winner

The 1947–48 Duke Blue Devils men's basketball team represented Duke University during the 1947–48 men's college basketball season. The head coach was Gerry Gerard, coaching his sixth season with the Blue Devils. The team finished with an overall record of 17–12.
