= 1941 Southern Conference men's basketball tournament =

- Classification: Division I
- Teams: 8
- Site: Thompson Gym; Raleigh, NC
- Champions: Duke (2nd title)
- Winning coach: Eddie Cameron (2nd title)

1940–41 Southern Conference men's basketball standings
	Conf.				Overall
Team	W		L	PCT	W		L	PCT
North Carolina	14	–	1	.933	19	–	9	.679
South Carolina	8	–	3	.727	15	–	9	.625
William & Mary	8	–	3	.727	15	–	10	.600
Washington and Lee	9	–	4	.692	11	–	11	.500
Duke †	8	–	4	.667	14	–	8	.636
VMI	8	–	4	.667	10	–	6	.625
Richmond	7	–	5	.583	11	–	10	.524
Wake Forest	7	–	6	.538	9	–	9	.500
Clemson	7	–	8	.467	8	–	14	.364
Davidson	5	–	7	.417	11	–	12	.478
North Carolina State	6	–	9	.400	6	–	9	.400
Virginia Tech	4	–	8	.333	8	–	13	.381
The Citadel	1	–	8	.111	5	–	13	.278
Furman	1	–	10	.091	4	–	13	.235
Maryland	0	–	13	.000	1	–	21	.045
† Southern Conference Tournament winner

The 1941 Southern Conference men's basketball tournament took place from February 27–March 1, 1941, at Thompson Gym in Raleigh, North Carolina. The Duke Blue Devils won their second Southern Conference title, led by head coach Eddie Cameron.

== Format ==
The top eight finishers of the conference's fifteen members were eligible for the tournament. Teams were seeded based on conference winning percentage. The tournament used a preset bracket consisting of three rounds.

== Bracket ==
Quarterfinals; February 27
Duke	38
North Carolina	37
William & Mary	52
Wake Forest	34
South Carolina	41
Richmond	32
Washington and Lee	32
VMI	39

Semifinals; February 28
Duke	57
William & Mary	42
South Carolina	37
VMI	36

Finals; March 1
Duke	53
South Carolina	30

* Overtime game

== See also ==
- List of Southern Conference men's basketball champions
