= 1948 Southern Conference men's basketball tournament =

- Classification: Division I
- Teams: 10
- Site: Duke Indoor Stadium; Durham, NC
- Champions: North Carolina State (3rd title)
- Winning coach: Everett Case (2nd title)

1947–48 Southern Conference men's basketball standings
	Conf.				Overall
Team	W		L	PCT	W		L	PCT
North Carolina State †	12	–	0	1.000	29	–	3	.906
George Washington	13	–	3	.813	19	–	7	.731
North Carolina	11	–	4	.733	20	–	7	.741
Maryland	9	–	6	.600	11	–	14	.440
Davidson	10	–	7	.588	19	–	9	.679
Virginia Tech	7	–	5	.583	14	–	9	.609
Duke	8	–	6	.571	17	–	12	.586
Wake Forest	8	–	7	.533	18	–	11	.621
William & Mary	8	–	7	.533	13	–	10	.565
South Carolina	8	–	7	.533	12	–	11	.522
Washington and Lee	5	–	9	.357	7	–	17	.292
The Citadel	4	–	8	.333	8	–	9	.471
Richmond	4	–	9	.308	8	–	14	.364
Furman	3	–	10	.231	11	–	15	.423
Clemson	3	–	14	.176	6	–	17	.261
VMI	1	–	12	.077	3	–	16	.158
† Southern Conference Tournament winner

The 1948 Southern Conference men's basketball tournament took place from March 2–5, 1948 at Duke Indoor Stadium in Durham, North Carolina. The North Carolina State Wolfpack won their third Southern Conference title, led by head coach Everett Case.

== Format ==
The top ten finishers of the conference's sixteen members were eligible for the tournament. Teams were seeded based on conference winning percentage. The tournament used a preset bracket consisting of four rounds, the first of which featured two games, with the winners moving on to the quarterfinals.

== Bracket ==
First round March 2
Wake Forest	56
William & Mary	61
Duke	63
South Carolina	48

Quarterfinals; March 3
NC State	73
William & Mary	52
North Carolina	61
Virginia Tech	40
Maryland	51
Davidson	58
Duke	54
George Washington	51

Semifinals; March 4
NC State	55
North Carolina	50
Duke	53
Davidson	37

Finals; March 5
NC State	58
Duke	50

* Overtime game

== See also ==
- List of Southern Conference men's basketball champions
