= 1944 Southern Conference men's basketball tournament =

- Classification: Division I
- Teams: 8
- Site: Thompson Gym; Raleigh, NC
- Champions: Duke (4th title)
- Winning coach: Gerry Gerard (2nd title)

1943–44 Southern Conference men's basketball standings
	Conf.				Overall
Team	W		L	PCT	W		L	PCT
North Carolina	9	–	1	.900	17	–	10	.630
Virginia Tech	4	–	1	.800	11	–	4	.733
Duke †	4	–	2	.667	13	–	13	.500
Maryland	2	–	1	.667	4	–	14	.222
Richmond	2	–	2	.500	7	–	6	.538
Davidson	3	–	4	.429	16	–	7	.696
South Carolina	1	–	2	.333	13	–	2	.867
Clemson	1	–	2	.333	1	–	10	.091
North Carolina State	2	–	5	.286	5	–	13	.278
William & Mary	1	–	3	.250	10	–	11	.476
The Citadel	0	–	1	.000	2	–	3	.400
VMI	0	–	5	.000	0	–	14	.000
† Southern Conference Tournament winner

The 1944 Southern Conference men's basketball tournament took place from February 24–26, 1944 at Thompson Gym in Raleigh, North Carolina. The Duke Blue Devils won their fourth Southern Conference title, led by head coach Gerry Gerard.

== Format ==
The top eight finishers of the conference's twelve members were eligible for the tournament. Teams were seeded based on conference winning percentage. The tournament used a preset bracket consisting of three rounds.

== Bracket ==
Quarterfinals; February 24
Virginia Tech	38
Davidson	34
North Carolina	62
Richmond	41
NC State	42
Maryland	23
Duke	68
William & Mary	25

Semifinals; February 25
Virginia Tech	24
North Carolina	39
Duke	40
NC State	32

Finals; February 26
North Carolina	27
Duke	44

* Overtime game

== See also ==
- List of Southern Conference men's basketball champions
