= 1940–41 Duke Blue Devils men's basketball team =

American college basketball season

1940–41 Duke Blue Devils men's basketball

SoCon Tournament champions
- Conference: Southern Conference
- Record: 14–8 (8–4 Southern)
- Head coach: Eddie Cameron
- Home arena: Duke Indoor Stadium

1940–41 Southern Conference men's basketball standings
	Conf.				Overall
Team	W		L	PCT	W		L	PCT
North Carolina	14	–	1	.933	19	–	9	.679
South Carolina	8	–	3	.727	15	–	9	.625
William & Mary	8	–	3	.727	15	–	10	.600
Washington and Lee	9	–	4	.692	11	–	11	.500
Duke †	8	–	4	.667	14	–	8	.636
VMI	8	–	4	.667	10	–	6	.625
Richmond	7	–	5	.583	11	–	10	.524
Wake Forest	7	–	6	.538	9	–	9	.500
Clemson	7	–	8	.467	8	–	14	.364
Davidson	5	–	7	.417	11	–	12	.478
North Carolina State	6	–	9	.400	6	–	9	.400
Virginia Tech	4	–	8	.333	8	–	13	.381
The Citadel	1	–	8	.111	5	–	13	.278
Furman	1	–	10	.091	4	–	13	.235
Maryland	0	–	13	.000	1	–	21	.045
† Southern Conference Tournament winner

The 1940–41 Duke Blue Devils men's basketball team represented Duke University during the 1940–41 men's college basketball season. The head coach was Eddie Cameron, coaching his 13th season with the Blue Devils. The team finished with an overall record of 14–8.
