= 1947 Macalester Scots football team =

American college football season

1947 Macalester Scots football

MIAC co-champion
- Conference: Minnesota Intercollegiate Athletic Conference
- Record: 5–0–1 (4–0 MIAC)
- Head coach: Dwight Stuessy (4th season)
- Home stadium: Shaw Field

1947 Minnesota Intercollegiate Athletic Conference football standings
	Conf.					Overall
Team	W		L		T	W		L		T
Macalester +	4	–	0	–	0	5	–	0	–	1
St. Thomas (MN) +	4	–	0	–	0	4	–	3	–	0
Gustavus Adolphus	4	–	1	–	0	7	–	1	–	1
St. Olaf	3	–	2	–	0	5	–	3	–	0
Saint John's (MN)	3	–	2	–	0	3	–	2	–	0
Hamline	2	–	3	–	0	3	–	5	–	0
Concordia (MN)	1	–	4	–	0	3	–	4	–	0
Saint Mary's (MN)	0	–	4	–	0	1	–	6	–	0
Augsburg	0	–	5	–	0	0	–	7	–	0
+ – Conference co-champions

The 1947 Macalester Scots football team represented Macalester College as a member of the Minnesota Intercollegiate Athletic Conference (MIAC) during the 1947 college football season. Led by fourth-year head coach Dwight Stuessy, the Scots compiled an overall record 5–0–1 with a mark of 4–0 in conference play, sharing the MIAC title with the St. Thomas Tommies. Macalester played home games at Shaw Field in Saint Paul, Minnesota.

== Schedule ==
Date	Time	Opponent	Site	Result	Source
September 27		at Carleton*	Northfield, MN	T 0–0	
October 4		Saint Mary's (MN)	Shaw Field; Saint Paul, MN	W 7–0	
October 18		at Concordia (MN)	Moorhead, MN	W 14–6	
October 25		at Jamestown*	Jamestown, ND	W 31–0	
November 1	2:00 p.m.	Hamline^{†}	Saint Paul, MN	W 6–0	
November 8		at St. Olaf	Northfield, MN	W 14–6	
*Non-conference game; ^{†}Homecoming; All times are in Central time
