= 1939–40 Duke Blue Devils men's basketball team =

American college basketball season

1939–40 Duke Blue Devils men's basketball

SoCon Regular Season champions
- Conference: Southern Conference
- Record: 19–7 (13–2 Southern)
- Head coach: Eddie Cameron
- Home arena: Duke Indoor Stadium

1939–40 Southern Conference men's basketball standings
	Conf.				Overall
Team	W		L	PCT	W		L	PCT
Duke	13	–	2	.867	19	–	7	.731
North Carolina †	11	–	2	.846	23	–	3	.885
Washington and Lee	7	–	3	.700	13	–	5	.722
Wake Forest	10	–	5	.667	13	–	9	.591
Maryland	7	–	5	.583	14	–	9	.609
Clemson	9	–	7	.563	9	–	12	.429
Richmond	5	–	4	.556	11	–	6	.647
The Citadel	6	–	5	.545	8	–	9	.471
William & Mary	6	–	5	.545	12	–	11	.522
Furman	4	–	6	.400	11	–	11	.500
North Carolina State	5	–	10	.333	8	–	11	.421
Davidson	4	–	11	.267	8	–	13	.381
South Carolina	3	–	10	.231	5	–	13	.278
VMI	2	–	9	.182	3	–	12	.200
Virginia Tech	1	–	9	.100	4	–	15	.211
† Southern Conference Tournament winner

The 1939–40 Duke Blue Devils men's basketball team represented Duke University during the 1939–40 men's college basketball season. The head coach was Eddie Cameron, coaching his 12th season with the Blue Devils. The team finished with an overall record of 19–7.
