= 1947 Southern Conference men's basketball tournament =

- Classification: Division I
- Teams: 8
- Site: Duke Indoor Stadium; Durham, NC
- Champions: North Carolina State (2nd title)
- Winning coach: Everett Case (1st title)

1946–47 Southern Conference men's basketball standings
| | Conf. | | | | Overall |
| Team | W | | L | PCT | W | | L | PCT |
|---|---|---|---|---|---|---|---|---|
| North Carolina State † | 11 | – | 2 | .846 | 26 | – | 5 | .839 |
| North Carolina | 10 | – | 2 | .833 | 19 | – | 8 | .704 |
| Duke | 10 | – | 4 | .714 | 19 | – | 8 | .704 |
| George Washington | 9 | – | 4 | .692 | 21 | – | 7 | .750 |
| Maryland | 9 | – | 5 | .643 | 14 | – | 10 | .583 |
| Richmond | 8 | – | 5 | .615 | 17 | – | 9 | .654 |
| South Carolina | 7 | – | 5 | .583 | 16 | – | 9 | .640 |
| Washington and Lee | 7 | – | 6 | .538 | 16 | – | 7 | .696 |
| Davidson | 7 | – | 7 | .500 | 17 | – | 8 | .680 |
| William & Mary | 6 | – | 6 | .500 | 14 | – | 12 | .538 |
| Wake Forest | 8 | – | 9 | .471 | 11 | – | 13 | .458 |
| Furman | 5 | – | 7 | .417 | 9 | – | 10 | .474 |
| Virginia Tech | 4 | – | 9 | .308 | 13 | – | 13 | .500 |
| Clemson | 2 | – | 12 | .143 | 7 | – | 13 | .350 |
| The Citadel | 1 | – | 11 | .083 | 5 | – | 11 | .313 |
| VMI | 1 | – | 11 | .083 | 2 | – | 14 | .125 |
† Southern Conference Tournament winner

The 1947 Southern Conference men's basketball tournament took place from March 6–8, 1947 at Duke Indoor Stadium in Durham, North Carolina. The North Carolina State Wolfpack won their second Southern Conference title, led by head coach Everett Case.

== Format ==
The top eight finishers of the conference's sixteen members were eligible for the tournament. Teams were seeded based on conference winning percentage. The tournament used a preset bracket consisting of three rounds.

== Bracket ==
Quarterfinals; March 6
NC State | 55
Maryland | 43
George Washington | 70
Washington and Lee | 55
North Carolina | 55
Richmond | 43
Duke | 54
South Carolina | 56

Semifinals; March 7
NC State | 70
George Washington | 47
North Carolina | 58
South Carolina | 53

Finals; March 8
NC State | 50
North Carolina | 48

* Overtime game

== See also ==
- List of Southern Conference men's basketball champions
