= Barney Wilson =

American basketball coach

Biographical details
- Born: February 23, 1912; Chattanooga, Tennessee, U.S.
- Died: April 6, 1999 (aged 87); Tennessee, U.S.

Coaching career (HC unless noted)
- 1947–1951: William & Mary

Head coaching record
- Overall: 80–40

Bernard Edgar "Barney" Wilson Jr. (February 23, 1912 – April 6, 1999) was the head coach for the William & Mary Tribe men's basketball team from 1947 to 1951. He led the Tribe to a 43–20 mark in Southern Conference play and 80–40 overall. Wilson holds the W&M all-time highest win percentage (.667) for men's basketball coaches who have coached 100+ games at the college.

Wilson attended Tennessee Wesleyan University and Eastern Kentucky University. He later worked in the insurance industry. He died in 1999.

== Head coaching record ==
Record table
Season	Team	Overall	Conference	Standing	Postseason
William & Mary Indians (Southern Conference) (1947–1951)
1947–48	William & Mary	13–10	8–7	T–8th	
1948–49	William & Mary	24–10	10–3	2nd	Cincinnati Invitational Tournament
1949–50	William & Mary	23–9	12–4	T–2nd	Cincinnati Invitational Tournament
1950–51	William & Mary	20–11	13–6	T–4th	
William & Mary:		80–40	43–20		
Total:		80–40			

== See also ==
- William & Mary scandal of 1951
