= Rock Norman =

American basketball and track coach (1892–1981)

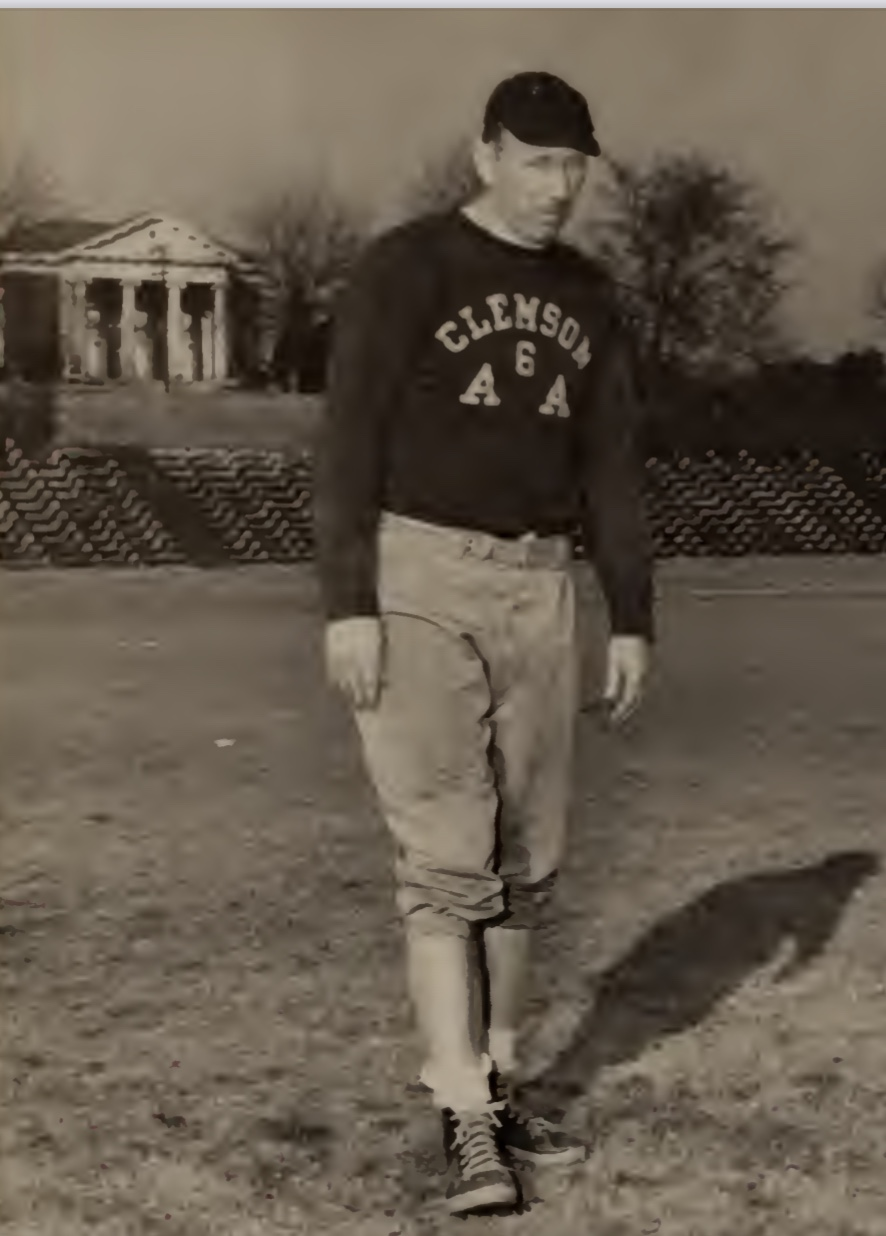
- Norman circa 1942

Biographical details
- Born: September 15, 1892; Stevensburg, Virginia, U.S.
- Died: June 20, 1981 (aged 88); Anderson, South Carolina, U.S.

Playing career
- 1910–1913: Roanoke

Coaching career (HC unless noted)

Basketball
- 1927–1928: Furman
- 1928–1932: South Carolina
- 1933–1935: South Carolina
- 1935–1939: The Citadel
- 1940–1946: Clemson

Head coaching record
- Overall: 149–161

Accomplishments and honors

Championships
- SoCon regular season (1934)

Absalom Willis "Rock" Norman (September 15, 1892 – June 20, 1981) was an American college basketball and track coach. Norman spent 51 years coaching at the college and high school level, with basketball head coaching stints at several colleges in the state of South Carolina: Furman, South Carolina, The Citadel and Clemson.

He also served as an assistant football coach at Clemson, as well as head track coach for the Tigers, where he is the namesake of the Rock Norman Track and Field Complex.

Norman died at Anderson Memorial Hospital in Anderson, South Carolina, on June 20, 1981, at age 88.
