= Dwight Stuessy =

American football and basketball coach and college athletics administrator

Biographical details
- Born: June 15, 1906
- Died: February 12, 1957 (aged 50); Saint Paul, Minnesota, U.S.

Playing career

Football
- 1926–1928: Illinois
- Position: Quarterback

Coaching career (HC unless noted)

Football
- 1929–1936: Durham HS (NC)
- 1937–1938: Macalester
- 1946–1956: Macalester

Basketball
- 1929–1937: Durham HS (NC)
- 1937–1939: Macalester
- 1939–1943: William & Mary
- 1946–1957: Macalester

Administrative career (AD unless noted)
- 1946–1957: Macalester

Head coaching record
- Overall: 45–49–7 (college football)

Accomplishments and honors

Championships
- 1 MIAC (1947)

T. Dwight "Slip" Stuessy (June 15, 1906 – February 12, 1957) was an American football and basketball coach and college athletics administrator. He served two stints as the head football coach at Macalester College in Saint Paul, Minnesota, from 1937 to 1938 and 1946 to 1956, compiling a record of 45–49–7. Stuessy also had two stints as the head basketball coach at Macalester, from 1937 to 1939 and 1946 until his death in early 1957. In between his two runs as Macalester, he was the head basketball coach at the College of William & Mary in Williamsburg, Virginia, from 1939 to 1943. He led the William & Mary Tribe to a 54–39 overall record and a 28–16 mark in Southern Conference play during his four seasons as coach.

A native of Woodstock, Illinois, Stuessy played college football at the University of Illinois at Urbana–Champaign as quarterback from 1926 to 1928 under head coach Robert Zuppke. He was a member of the 1927 Illinois Fighting Illini football team, which was recognized as a national champion. Stuessy died of a heart attack on February 12, 1957, after coaching a basketball game at the College of St. Thomas in Saint Paul, Minnesota.

== Head coaching record ==
=== College football ===
Year	Team	Overall	Conference	Standing	Bowl/playoffs
Macalester Scots (Minnesota Intercollegiate Athletic Conference) (1937–1938)
1937	Macalester	1–5–1	1–4	7th	
1938	Macalester	4–3	2–3	T–5th	
Macalester Scots (Minnesota Intercollegiate Athletic Conference) (1946–1956)
1946	Macalester	1–6–1	0–4–1	8th	
1947	Macalester	5–0–1	4–0	T–1st	
1948	Macalester	6–2	4–1	T–2nd	
1949	Macalester	3–4–1	2–3–1	T–5th	
1950	Macalester	5–3–1	3–2–1	4th	
1951	Macalester	2–7	0–6	T–9th	
1952	Macalester	2–4–1	2–2–1	T–4th	
1953	Macalester	5–3	4–2	T–3rd	
1954	Macalester	2–6	1–5	7th	
1955	Macalester	4–3–1	4–2	T–2nd	
1956	Macalester	5–3	4–3	T–3rd	
Macalester:		45–49–7	31–37–4		
Total:		45–49–7			
National championship Conference title Conference division title or championship game berth
