= Blues Armory =

Historic structure in Virginia, US

- U.S. National Register of Historic Places
- Virginia Landmarks Register
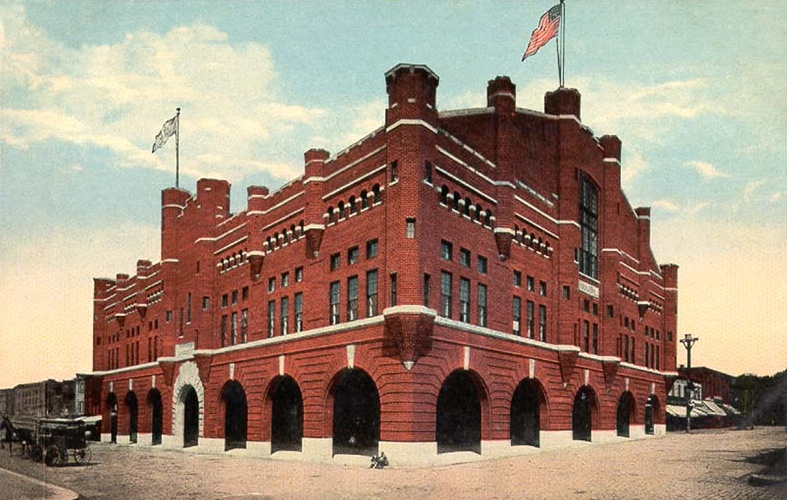

- Location within Virginia Location within the United States
- Location: 6th and Marshall Sts., Richmond, Virginia
- Coordinates: 37°32′35″N 77°26′9″W
- Area: less than one acre
- Built: 1910
- Architect: Averill & Hall
- NRHP reference No.: 76002229
- VLR No.: 127-0278

Significant dates
- Added to NRHP: May 17, 1976
- Designated VLR: December 16, 1975

The Blues Armory is a large brick armory in downtown Richmond, Virginia. Housing the Richmond Light Infantry Blues, the castle-like structure originally served multiple purposes, with a food market on the ground floor and a drill hall for the National Guard of the United States on the top floor. The level between housed suites of offices for each individual National Guard company. The Richmond Spiders played their home basketball games at the site for a period of time. In 1985, the ground floor was converted to retail and restaurant space, part of the Sixth Street Marketplace.

The composite steel-reinforced structure is clad with brick and heavily rusticated stone masonry. Completed in 1910, it was designed by the Washington, D.C. firm of Averill and Hall. The castellated design was not entirely whimsical, as the structure was designed to withstand attack during riots. The ground floor was entirely separated from the military upper floors. The structure extends over the sidewalks, forming an arcade at ground level, with five bays on the Marshall Street side and seven bays on Sixth Street. The corners are marked with projecting turrets or bartizans, while the upper level is machicolated. The roof of the drill hall rises above the parapet.

The Richmond Light Infantry Blues existed from 1789. They were called in 1800 to deal with Gabriel's Rebellion, led by the slave Gabriel. During the American Civil War the unit was part of the Army of Northern Virginia. From 1894 the Blues were a battalion, then a regiment after World War II. A 1968 reorganization of the National Guard disestablished the Blues and the armory fell into disuse. By the 1990s, the lower level was incorporated into the Sixth Street Marketplace development. The upper floor offices and first floor food court closed in 2002.

The Blues Armory was listed on the National Register of Historic Places on May 17, 1976.
