= Gerry Gerard =

American basketball and soccer coach (1903–1951)

Biographical details
- Born: July 14, 1903; Indiana, U.S.
- Died: January 17, 1951 (aged 47); Durham, North Carolina, U.S.

Playing career

Football
- c. 1925: Illinois

Basketball
- c. 1925: Illinois

Track and field
- c. 1925: Illinois
- Positions: End, quarterback (football); Javelin (track and field)

Coaching career (HC unless noted)

Football
- 1928: Athen HS (PA)

Basketball
- 1941–1943: Duke (assistant)
- 1943–1950: Duke

Soccer
- 1935–1948: Duke

Head coaching record
- Overall: 131–78 (basketball); 41–27–10 (soccer)

Accomplishments and honors

Championships
- Basketball; 1 SoCon regular season (1943); 2 SoCon tournament (1944, 1946)

Awards
- Basketball; 2× SoCon Coach of the Year (1944, 1946)

Kenneth Carlyle "Gerry" Gerard (July 14, 1903 – January 17, 1951) was an American basketball and soccer coach. He served as the head basketball coach at Duke University from 1943 to 1950, compiling a record of 131–78. Gerard first arrived at Duke to serve as the director of intramural sports in 1931. He helped form the Duke Blue Devils men's soccer program in 1935, coaching the team for 11 seasons.

A native of Mishawaka, Indiana, Gerard attended the University of Illinois, where played basketball and football as an end and quarterback. He also threw the javelin on Illinois track team. He graduated from Illinois in June 1928 with a Bachelor of Science degree and began his career that fall as a teacher and head football coach at the high school in Athens, Pennsylvania.

Gerard joined the Duke basketball coaching staff in 1941, acting as an assistant coach under Eddie Cameron for two seasons, prior to being named head coach in 1943. He coached Duke for eight seasons (1943–1950), winning the Southern Conference tournament and Coach of the Year honors in 1944 and 1946.

Gerard's health began to decline in 1949 and he took a leave of absence in November 1950. He died on January 17, 1951, at Duke University Hospital, in Durham, North Carolina after a serious injury lasting several months.

== Head coaching record ==
=== Basketball ===
Record table
Season	Team	Overall	Conference	Standing	Postseason
Duke Blue Devils (Southern Conference) (1942–1950)
1942–43	Duke	20–6	12–1	1st	
1943–44	Duke	13–13	4–2	T–3rd	
1944–45	Duke	13–9	6–1	3rd	
1945–46	Duke	21–6	12–2	2nd	
1946–47	Duke	19–8	10–4	3rd	
1947–48	Duke	17–12	8–6	7th	
1948–49	Duke	13–9	5–7	10th	
1949–50	Duke	15–15	9–7	8th	
Duke:		131–78	66–30		
Total:		131–78			
National champion Postseason invitational champion Conference regular season champion Conference regular season and conference tournament champion Division regular season champion Division regular season and conference tournament champion Conference tournament champion
