= Clemson Tigers men's basketball, 1940–1949 =

The Clemson Tigers men's basketball teams of 1940–1949 represented Clemson Agricultural College in NCAA college basketball competition.

== 1939–40 ==
1939–40 Clemson Tigers men's basketball
- Conference: Southern Conference
- Record: 9–12 (9–8 SoCon)
- Head coach: Joe Davis
- Home arena: Clemson Field House

| Date | Opponent | Site | Result |
|---|---|---|---|
| December 21* | vs. Kentucky | Asheville, North Carolina | L 30–55 |
| December 30* | at Baltimore | Baltimore, Maryland | L 41–54 |
| January 1 | at Maryland | Ritchie Coliseum • College Park, Maryland | L 26–53 |
| January 2 | at George Washington | Washington, D.C. | L 32–49 |
| January 6* | Georgia | Clemson Field House • Calhoun, South Carolina | L 29–32 |
| January 10 | Wake Forest | Clemson Field House • Calhoun, South Carolina | W 30–28 |
| January 12 | Furman | Clemson Field House • Calhoun, South Carolina | W 68–36 |
| January 13 | NC State | Clemson Field House • Calhoun, South Carolina | W 66–31 |
| January 18 | at NC State | Thompson Gym • Raleigh, North Carolina | W 48–38 |
| January 19 | at Duke | Card Gymnasium • Durham, North Carolina | L 49–54 |
| January 27 | Maryland | Clemson Field House • Calhoun, South Carolina | W 48–30 |
| February 3 | North Carolina | Clemson Field House • Calhoun, South Carolina | L 31–39 (OT) |
| February 9 | at South Carolina | Carolina Fieldhouse • Columbia, South Carolina | W 37–32 |
| February 10 | at The Citadel | The Citadel Armory • Charleston, South Carolina | W 38–27 |
| February 12 | Duke | Clemson Field House • Calhoun, South Carolina | L 37–39 (OT) |
| February 14 | at Furman | Greenville, South Carolina | L 37–38 |
| February 17 | South Carolina | Clemson Field House • Calhoun, South Carolina | W 56–25 |
| February 19 | at North Carolina | Woollen Gymnasium • Chapel Hill, North Carolina | L 30–47 |
| February 20 | at Wake Forest | Gore Gymnasium • Wake Forest, North Carolina | L 39–53 |
| February 23 | at The Citadel | Clemson Field House • Calhoun, South Carolina | W 46–30 |
| February 29* | vs. North Carolina | Thompson Gym • Raleigh, North Carolina (Southern Conference tournament first round) | L 41–50 |
*Non-Conference Game.

== 1940–41 ==
1940–41 Clemson Tigers men's basketball
- Conference: Southern Conference
- Record: 8–14 (7–10 SoCon)
- Head coach: Rock Norman
- Home arena: Clemson Field House

| Date | Opponent | Site | Result |
|---|---|---|---|
| December 13* | Georgia | Clemson Field House • Calhoun, South Carolina | L 51–65 |
| December 17 | at William & Mary | Blow Gymnasium • Williamsburg, Virginia | L 40–60 |
| December 18 | at Richmond | Millhiser Gymnasium • Richmond, Virginia | L 45–52 |
| December 19 | vs. Maryland | Baltimore, Maryland | W 48–34 |
| December 20 | at George Washington | Washington, D.C. | L 40–64 |
| January 2* | at Georgia | Woodruff Hall • Athens, Georgia | L 43–58 |
| January 6 | Furman | Clemson Field House • Calhoun, South Carolina | W 43–32 |
| January 8* | at Georgia Tech | Heisman Gymnasium • Atlanta | L 51–63 |
| January 10 | NC State | Clemson Field House • Calhoun, South Carolina | W 48–39 |
| January 14 | George Washington | Clemson Field House • Calhoun, South Carolina | L 49–69 |
| January 16 | at NC State | Thompson Gym • Raleigh, North Carolina | L 43–44 |
| January 17 | at Wake Forest | Gore Gymnasium • Wake Forest, North Carolina | L 35–42 |
| January 18 | at Duke | Duke Indoor Stadium • Durham, North Carolina | L 42–45 |
| January 22* | Georgia Tech | Clemson Field House • Calhoun, South Carolina | W 52–49 (OT) |
| February 7 | at South Carolina | Carolina Fieldhouse • Columbia, South Carolina | L 31–50 |
| February 8 | at The Citadel | The Citadel Armory • Charleston, South Carolina | W 62–48 |
| February 10 | at North Carolina | Woollen Gymnasium • Chapel Hill, North Carolina | L 53–76 |
| February 13 | at Furman | Greenville, South Carolina | W 56–36 |
| February 15 | South Carolina | Clemson Field House • Calhoun, South Carolina | L 39–40 |
| February 18 | Wake Forest | Clemson Field House • Calhoun, South Carolina | W 54–53 |
| February 21 | The Citadel | Clemson Field House • Calhoun, South Carolina | W 62–43 |
| February 24* | Presbyterian | Clemson Field House • Calhoun, South Carolina | L 48–59 |
*Non-Conference Game.

== 1941–42 ==
1941–42 Clemson Tigers men's basketball
- Conference: Southern Conference
- Record: 3–14 (2–10 SoCon)
- Head coach: Rock Norman
- Home arena: Clemson Field House

| Date | Opponent | Site | Result |
|---|---|---|---|
| January 6* | vs. Georgia | Augusta, Georgia | L 31–38 |
| January 7 | George Washington | Clemson Field House • Calhoun, South Carolina | L 34–67 |
| January 10 | Furman | Clemson Field House • Calhoun, South Carolina | L 39–40 |
| January 13 | at NC State | Thompson Gym • Raleigh, North Carolina | L 36–52 |
| January 14 | at Wake Forest | Gore Gymnasium • Wake Forest, North Carolina | L 40–58 |
| January 16 | North Carolina | Clemson Field House • Calhoun, South Carolina | L 34–54 |
| January 31* | at Wofford | Andrews Field House • Spartanburg, South Carolina | L 27–57 |
| February 5 | William & Mary | Clemson Field House • Calhoun, South Carolina | L 28–54 |
| February 6 | at South Carolina | Carolina Fieldhouse • Columbia, South Carolina | L 35–62 |
| February 7 | at The Citadel | The Citadel Armory • Charleston, South Carolina | W 39–38 |
| February 10 | at Furman | Greenville, South Carolina | L 42–56 |
| February 14 | South Carolina | Clemson Field House • Calhoun, South Carolina | L 24–38 |
| February 20* | at Presbyterian | Clinton, South Carolina | L 29–53 |
| February 23 | Wake Forest | Clemson Field House • Calhoun, South Carolina | L 37–52 |
| February 24 | The Citadel | Clemson Field House • Calhoun, South Carolina | W 37–25 |
| February 27* | Wofford | Clemson Field House • Calhoun, South Carolina | W 31–22 |
*Non-Conference Game.

== 1942–43 ==
1942–43 Clemson Tigers men's basketball
- Conference: Southern Conference
- Record: 3–13 (0–10 SoCon)
- Head coach: Rock Norman
- Home arena: Clemson Field House

| Date | Opponent | Site | Result |
|---|---|---|---|
| December 16* | Erskine | Clemson Field House • Clemson, South Carolina | W 44–22 |
| January 8 | NC State | Clemson Field House • Clemson, South Carolina | L 40–48 |
| January 12 | Wake Forest | Clemson Field House • Clemson, South Carolina | L 56–71 |
| January 23* | at Presbyterian | Clinton, South Carolina | W 48–44 |
| January 20* | Wofford | Clemson Field House • Clemson, South Carolina | W 54–45 |
| January 23* | Presbyterian | Clemson Field House • Clemson, South Carolina | L 44–49 |
| February 1 | at NC State | Thompson Gym • Raleigh, North Carolina | L 34–69 |
| February 2 | at North Carolina | Woollen Gymnasium • Chapel Hill, North Carolina | L 32–52 |
| February 5 | at South Carolina | Carolina Fieldhouse • Columbia, South Carolina | L 30–48 |
| February 6 | at The Citadel | The Citadel Armory • Charleston, South Carolina | L 35–49 |
| February 10* | at Georgia Tech | Heisman Gymnasium • Atlanta | L 32–43 |
| February 13 | South Carolina | Clemson Field House • Clemson, South Carolina | L 40–42 |
| February 16 | at Davidson | Davidson, North Carolina | L 31–53 |
| February 20* | at Wofford | Clemson Field House • Clemson, South Carolina | L 36–46 |
| February 24 | The Citadel | Clemson Field House • Clemson, South Carolina | L 38–63 |
| February 27 | Davidson | Clemson Field House • Clemson, South Carolina | L 32–49 |
*Non-Conference Game.

== 1943–44 ==
1943–44 Clemson Tigers men's basketball
- Conference: Southern Conference
- Record: 1–10 (0–3 SoCon)
- Head coach: Rock Norman
- Home arena: Clemson Field House

| Date | Opponent | Site | Result |
|---|---|---|---|
| January 10* | Georgia | Clemson Field House • Clemson, South Carolina | L 40–44 |
| January 12* | at Presbyterian | Clinton, South Carolina | L 33–55 |
| January 19* | at Georgia | Woodruff Hall • Athens, Georgia | L 31–54 |
| January 22* | Georgia Tech | Clemson Field House • Clemson, South Carolina | L 34–50 |
| January 29* | at Georgia Tech | Heisman Gymnasium • Atlanta | L 24–58 |
| February 1* | Presbyterian | Clemson Field House • Clemson, South Carolina | W 43–41 |
| February 2* | Catawba | Clemson Field House • Clemson, South Carolina | L 29–38 |
| February 12 | South Carolina | Clemson Field House • Clemson, South Carolina | L 37–66 |
| February 15* | at Catawba | Salisbury, North Carolina | L 33–42 |
| February 16 | at Davidson | Davidson, North Carolina | L 40–42 |
| February 19 | at South Carolina | Carolina Fieldhouse • Columbia, South Carolina | L 31–57 |
*Non-Conference Game.

== 1944–45 ==
1944–45 Clemson Tigers men's basketball
- Conference: Southern Conference
- Record: 8–8 (4–5 SoCon)
- Head coach: Rock Norman
- Home arena: Clemson Field House

| Date | Opponent | Site | Result |
|---|---|---|---|
| January 8* | at Georgia | Woodruff Hall • Athens, Georgia | L 30–37 |
| January 13* | at Wofford | Andrews Field House • Spartanburg, South Carolina | W 32–21 |
| January 17* | at Presbyterian | Clinton, South Carolina | W 44–36 |
| January 19 | South Carolina | Clemson Field House • Clemson, South Carolina | L 34–58 |
| January 23* | Georgia | Clemson Field House • Clemson, South Carolina | L 40–51 |
| January 27 | Furman | Clemson Field House • Clemson, South Carolina | W 29–22 |
| February 2* | Presbyterian | Clemson Field House • Clemson, South Carolina | W 58–34 |
| February 6* | Wofford | Clemson Field House • Clemson, South Carolina | W 32–21 |
| February 8 | at South Carolina | Carolina Fieldhouse • Columbia, South Carolina | L 38–76 |
| February 9 | at The Citadel | The Citadel Armory • Charleston, South Carolina | W 52–43 |
| February 10 | at The Citadel | The Citadel Armory • Charleston, South Carolina | L 29–52 |
| February 15 | The Citadel | Clemson Field House • Clemson, South Carolina | L 39–41 (OT) |
| February 16 | The Citadel | Clemson Field House • Clemson, South Carolina | W 43–38 |
| February 17 | Davidson | Clemson Field House • Clemson, South Carolina | L 31–34 |
| February 20 | at Furman | Greenville, South Carolina | W 34–31 |
| February 23* | vs. South Carolina | Thompson Gym • Raleigh, North Carolina (Southern Conference tournament) | L 24–55 |
*Non-Conference Game.

== 1945–46 ==
1945–46 Clemson Tigers men's basketball
- Conference: Southern Conference
- Record: 9–11 (5–7 SoCon)
- Head coach: Rock Norman
- Home arena: Clemson Field House

| Date | Opponent | Site | Result |
|---|---|---|---|
| December 12* | Georgia | Clemson Field House • Clemson, South Carolina | L 34–41 |
| December 20* | at Georgia Tech | Heisman Gymnasium • Atlanta | L 38–52 |
| January 5* | Georgia Tech | Clemson Field House • Clemson, South Carolina | L 46–61 |
| January 7 | NC State | Clemson Field House • Clemson, South Carolina | L 43–48 |
| January 8* | at Wofford | Andrews Field House • Spartanburg, South Carolina | W 34–21 |
| January 15 | Furman | Clemson Field House • Clemson, South Carolina | W 44–36 |
| January 17* | Wofford | Clemson Field House • Clemson, South Carolina | W 60–25 |
| January 19 | Duke | Clemson Field House • Clemson, South Carolina | L 29–42 |
| January 23* | at Presbyterian | Clinton, South Carolina | W 56–18 |
| January 26 | South Carolina | Clemson Field House • Clemson, South Carolina | W 47–42 |
| February 2* | Presbyterian | Clemson Field House • Clemson, South Carolina | W 56–46 |
| February 6 | Davidson | Clemson Field House • Clemson, South Carolina | L 33–44 |
| February 8 | at South Carolina | Carolina Fieldhouse • Columbia, South Carolina | L 41–51 |
| February 9 | at The Citadel | The Citadel Armory • Charleston, South Carolina | W 63–46 |
| February 13 | at NC State | Thompson Gym • Raleigh, North Carolina | L 46–51 (OT) |
| February 14 | at Duke | Duke Indoor Stadium • Durham, North Carolina | L 33–61 |
| February 15 | at Davidson | Davidson, North Carolina | W 53–49 |
| February 19 | at Furman | Greenville, South Carolina | L 39–49 |
| February 21* | at Georgia | Woodruff Hall • Athens, Georgia | L 51–72 |
| February 23 | The Citadel | Clemson Field House • Clemson, South Carolina | W 76–24 |
*Non-Conference Game.

== 1946–47 ==
1946–47 Clemson Tigers men's basketball
- Conference: Southern Conference
- Record: 7–13 (2–12 SoCon)
- Head coach: Banks McFadden
- Home arena: Clemson Field House

| Date | Opponent | Site | Result |
|---|---|---|---|
| December 11* | Erskine | Clemson Field House • Clemson, South Carolina | W 58–30 |
| December 14* | Wofford | Clemson Field House • Clemson, South Carolina | W 52–50 |
| January 7* | Presbyterian | Clemson Field House • Clemson, South Carolina | W 58–42 |
| January 8 | Wake Forest | Clemson Field House • Clemson, South Carolina | L 43–58 |
| January 11 | NC State | Clemson Field House • Clemson, South Carolina | L 54–86 |
| January 15 | at NC State | Thompson Gym • Raleigh, North Carolina | L 21–69 |
| January 16 | at Wake Forest | Gore Gymnasium • Wake Forest, North Carolina | L 51–67 |
| January 21* | at Wofford | Andrews Field House • Spartanburg, South Carolina | L 31–40 |
| January 24 | The Citadel | Clemson Field House • Clemson, South Carolina | W 60–40 |
| January 25 | at South Carolina | Carolina Fieldhouse • Columbia, South Carolina | L 39–73 |
| February 8 | South Carolina | Clemson Field House • Clemson, South Carolina | L 55–73 |
| February 10 | at Washington and Lee | Lexington, Virginia | L 56–101 |
| February 11 | at VMI | VMI Field House • Lexington, Virginia | L 63–64 |
| February 14 | at Davidson | Davidson, North Carolina | W 57–53 |
| February 15* | at Presbyterian | Clinton, South Carolina | W 54–53 |
| February 17 | at Furman | Greenville, South Carolina | L 53–65 |
| February 20 | at Davidson | Davidson, North Carolina | L 48–86 |
| February 24 | Furman | Clemson Field House • Clemson, South Carolina | L 45–50 |
| February 25* | at Erskine | Due West, South Carolina | W 63–47 |
| March 1 | at The Citadel | The Citadel Armory • Charleston, South Carolina | L 53–58 |
*Non-Conference Game.

== 1947–48 ==
1947–48 Clemson Tigers men's basketball
- Conference: Southern Conference
- Record: 6–17 (3–14 SoCon)
- Head coach: Banks McFadden
- Home arena: Clemson Field House

| Date | Opponent | Site | Result |
|---|---|---|---|
| December 9 | Davidson | Clemson Field House • Clemson, South Carolina | L 43–60 |
| December 11* | Georgia | Clemson Field House • Clemson, South Carolina | L 52–61 |
| December 13 | Washington and Lee | Clemson Field House • Clemson, South Carolina | L 58–65 |
| December 16* | at Wofford | Andrews Field House • Spartanburg, South Carolina | L 46–52 |
| December 20 | George Washington | Clemson Field House • Clemson, South Carolina | L 35–60 |
| January 9 | at George Washington | Washington, D.C. | L 67–79 |
| January 10 | at Maryland | Ritchie Coliseum • College Park, Maryland | L 42–49 |
| January 13* | Wofford | Clemson Field House • Clemson, South Carolina | W 59–44 |
| January 16 | at Duke | Duke Indoor Stadium • Durham, North Carolina | L 47–80 |
| January 17 | at Wake Forest | Gore Gymnasium • Wake Forest, North Carolina | L 48–68 |
| January 21 | South Carolina | Clemson Field House • Clemson, South Carolina | L 54–73 |
| January 23 | The Citadel | Clemson Field House • Clemson, South Carolina | L 50–52 |
| February 2* | Presbyterian | Clemson Field House • Clemson, South Carolina | W 82–40 |
| February 4 | Furman | Clemson Field House • Clemson, South Carolina | W 77–52 |
| February 6 | at South Carolina | Carolina Fieldhouse • Columbia, South Carolina | L 57–59 |
| February 7 | at The Citadel | The Citadel Armory • Charleston, South Carolina | L 43–47 |
| February 12 | at Davidson | Davidson, North Carolina | L 52–85 |
| February 14* | at Presbyterian | Clinton, South Carolina | W 64–43 |
| February 17 | Duke | Clemson Field House • Clemson, South Carolina | W 63–57 |
| February 19 | Wake Forest | Clemson Field House • Clemson, South Carolina | L 59–66 |
| February 20 | at Furman | Greenville, South Carolina | W 63–61 |
| February 23 | Maryland | Clemson Field House • Clemson, South Carolina | L 61–63 |
| February 28* | at Georgia | Woodruff Hall • Athens, Georgia | L 35–81 |
*Non-Conference Game.

== 1948–49 ==
1948–49 Clemson Tigers men's basketball
- Conference: Southern Conference
- Record: 10–11 (6–9 SoCon)
- Head coach: Banks McFadden
- Home arena: Clemson Field House

| Date | Opponent | Site | Result |
|---|---|---|---|
| December 3* | at Georgia | Woodruff Hall • Athens, Georgia | L 48–70 |
| December 8* | Georgia | Clemson Field House • Clemson, South Carolina | L 58–60 |
| December 11 | at Wake Forest | Gore Gymnasium • Wake Forest, North Carolina | L 50–58 |
| December 14* | Wofford | Clemson Field House • Clemson, South Carolina | W 49–44 |
| December 17 | at Richmond | Blues Armory • Richmond, Virginia | L 45–47 |
| December 18 | at Maryland | Ritchie Coliseum • College Park, Maryland | L 50–74 |
| January 8 | The Citadel | Clemson Field House • Clemson, South Carolina | W 65–39 |
| January 11* | at Wofford | Andrews Field House • Spartanburg, South Carolina | W 61–59 |
| January 13 | at Furman | Greenville, South Carolina | L 45–48 |
| January 15 | Wake Forest | Clemson Field House • Clemson, South Carolina | W 59–57 |
| January 21 | South Carolina | Clemson Field House • Clemson, South Carolina | L 48–51 |
| February 1 | at Davidson | Davidson, North Carolina | L 55–65 |
| February 4 | at South Carolina | Carolina Fieldhouse • Columbia, South Carolina | L 49–82 |
| February 5 | at The Citadel | The Citadel Armory • Charleston, South Carolina | W 63–44 |
| February 9* | Presbyterian | Clemson Field House • Clemson, South Carolina | W 79–29 |
| February 11 | at Washington and Lee | Lexington, Virginia | L 70–73 |
| February 12 | at VMI | VMI Field House • Lexington, Virginia | W 64–43 |
| February 15* | at Presbyterian | Clinton, South Carolina | W 65–41 |
| February 19 | Davidson | Clemson Field House • Clemson, South Carolina | L 52–54 |
| February 21 | Maryland | Clemson Field House • Clemson, South Carolina | W 68–49 |
| February 26 | Furman | Clemson Field House • Clemson, South Carolina | W 70–53 |
*Non-Conference Game.
