= 1958–59 Duke Blue Devils men's basketball team =

American college basketball season

1958–59 Duke Blue Devils men's basketball
- Conference: Atlantic Coast Conference
- Record: 13–12 (7–7 ACC)
- Head coach: Harold Bradley
- Assistant coach: Fred Shabel
- Home arena: Duke Indoor Stadium

1958–59 ACC men's basketball standings
	Conf.				Overall
Team	W		L	PCT	W		L	PCT
No. 6 NC State †	12	–	2	.857	22	–	4	.846
No. 9 North Carolina	12	–	2	.857	20	–	5	.800
Duke	7	–	7	.500	13	–	12	.520
Maryland	7	–	7	.500	10	–	13	.435
Virginia	6	–	8	.429	11	–	14	.440
Wake Forest	5	–	9	.357	10	–	14	.417
Clemson	5	–	9	.357	8	–	16	.333
South Carolina	2	–	12	.143	4	–	20	.167
† 1959 ACC tournament winner Rankings from AP Poll

The 1958–59 Duke Blue Devils men's basketball team represented Duke University in the 1958–59 NCAA University Division men's basketball season. The head coach was Harold Bradley and the team finished the season with an overall record of 13–12. This was the last season with Harold Bradley as their coach, as he left the following year to Texas.
