= 1955–56 William & Mary Indians men's basketball team =

American college basketball season

1955–56 William & Mary Indians men's basketball
- Conference: Southern Conference
- Record: 12–14 (9–7 SoCon)
- Head coach: Boydson Baird (4th season)
- Home arena: Blow Gymnasium

1955–56 Southern Conference men's basketball standings
	Conf.				Overall
Team	W		L	PCT	W		L	PCT
George Washington	10	–	2	.833	19	–	7	.731
No. 20 West Virginia †	10	–	2	.833	21	–	9	.700
Virginia Tech	10	–	7	.588	14	–	11	.560
Richmond	8	–	6	.571	16	–	13	.552
William & Mary	9	–	7	.563	12	–	14	.462
Furman	7	–	7	.500	12	–	16	.429
Davidson	5	–	7	.417	10	–	15	.400
Washington and Lee	5	–	8	.385	12	–	16	.429
VMI	3	–	11	.214	4	–	19	.174
The Citadel	0	–	10	.000	2	–	19	.095
† Southern Conference Tournament winner Rankings from AP Poll

The 1955–56 William & Mary Indians men's basketball team represented the College of William & Mary in intercollegiate basketball during the 1955–56 NCAA men's basketball season. Under the fourth year of head coach Boydson Baird, the team finished the season 12–14, 9–7 in the Southern Conference. This was the 51st season of the collegiate basketball program at William & Mary, whose nickname is now the Tribe. William & Mary played its home games at Blow Gymnasium.

The Indians finished in 5th place in the conference and qualified for the 1956 Southern Conference men's basketball tournament, held at the Richmond Arena. However, for the second consecutive year William & Mary fell to Richmond in the quarterfinals.

== Program notes ==
- William & Mary played one team for the first time this season: Rhode Island.

== Schedule ==
Date time, TV	Rank^{#}	Opponent^{#}	Result	Record	Site city, state
Regular season
		George Washington	L 75–81	0–1 (0–1)	Blow Gymnasium; Williamsburg, VA
12/8/1955*		at Maryland	L 51–52	0–2	Cole Field House; College Park, MD
*		Hampden–Sydney	W 76–69	1–2	Blow Gymnasium; Williamsburg, VA
12/28/1955*		vs. Rhode Island; UR Invitational	W 100–69	2–2	Richmond Arena; Richmond, VA
12/29/1955*		at Richmond; UR Invitational	L 60–72	2–3	Richmond Arena; Richmond, VA
12/30/1955*		vs. Seton Hall; UR Invitational	L 55–80	2–4	Richmond Arena; Richmond, VA
1/2/1956*		at Tennessee	W 93–83	3–4	Alumni Memorial Gym; Knoxville, TN
1/3/1956*		No. 4 Vanderbilt	L 80–89	3–5	Blow Gymnasium; Williamsburg, VA
		Washington and Lee	W 79–70	4–5 (1–1)	Blow Gymnasium; Williamsburg, VA
1/9/1956		Furman	W 92–81	5–5 (2–1)	Blow Gymnasium; Williamsburg, VA
1/14/1956		at Richmond	L 53–75	5–6 (2–2)	Richmond Arena; Richmond, VA
		at VPI	W 66–57	6–6 (3–2)	War Memorial Gymnasium; Blacksburg, VA
		at VMI	W 81–72	7–6 (4–2)	Cormack Field House; Lexington, VA
1/21/1956*		at No. 3 NC State	L 71–90	7–7	Reynolds Coliseum; Raleigh, NC
		at Davidson	W 85–75	8–7 (5–2)	Johnston Gym; Davidson, NC
2/4/1956		at Furman	L 85–109	8–8 (5–3)	Old Textile Hall; Greenville, SC
*		at No. 12 North Carolina	L 63–115	8–9	Woollen Gymnasium; Chapel Hill, NC
		VMI	W 89–78	9–9 (6–3)	Blow Gymnasium; Williamsburg, VA
2/13/1956		vs. West Virginia	L 90–105	9–10 (6–4)	Norfolk, VA
		at George Washington	L 69–81	9–11 (6–5)	Washington, DC
		at Washington and Lee	L 57–70	9–12 (6–6)	Doremus Gymnasium; Lexington, VA
2/20/1956		VPI	W 79–74	10–12 (7–6)	Blow Gymnasium; Williamsburg, VA
2/22/1956		at West Virginia	L 88–97	10–13 (7–7)	WVU Field House; Morgantown, WV
		Davidson	W 77–67	11–13 (8–7)	Blow Gymnasium; Williamsburg, VA
2/25/1956		Richmond	W 79–77	12–13 (9–7)	Blow Gymnasium; Williamsburg, VA
1956 Southern Conference Basketball Tournament
3/1/1956		vs. (4) Richmond; Quarterfinals	L 62–79	12–14	Richmond Arena; Richmond, VA
*Non-conference game. ^{#}Rankings from AP Poll. (#) Tournament seedings in parentheses.
