= 1956–57 William & Mary Indians men's basketball team =

American college basketball season

1956–57 William & Mary Indians men's basketball
- Conference: Southern Conference
- Record: 9–18 (7–11 SoCon)
- Head coach: Boydson Baird (5th season)
- Home arena: Blow Gymnasium

1956–57 Southern Conference men's basketball standings
	Conf.				Overall
Team	W		L	PCT	W		L	PCT
No. 7 West Virginia †	12	–	0	1.000	25	–	5	.833
Washington and Lee	10	–	3	.769	20	–	7	.741
Virginia Tech	12	–	5	.706	14	–	8	.636
Furman	7	–	5	.583	10	–	17	.370
Richmond	9	–	7	.563	15	–	11	.577
William & Mary	7	–	11	.389	9	–	18	.333
The Citadel	5	–	9	.357	11	–	14	.440
Davidson	4	–	8	.333	7	–	20	.259
George Washington	3	–	9	.250	3	–	21	.125
VMI	1	–	13	.071	4	–	22	.154
† Southern Conference Tournament winner Rankings from AP Poll

The 1956–57 William & Mary Indians men's basketball team represented the College of William & Mary in intercollegiate basketball during the 1956–57 NCAA University Division men's basketball season. Under the fifth, and final, year of head coach Boydson Baird, the team finished the season 9–18, 7–11 in the Southern Conference. This was the 52nd season of the collegiate basketball program at William & Mary, whose nickname is now the Tribe. William & Mary played its home games at Blow Gymnasium.

The Indians finished in 6th place in the conference and qualified for the 1957 Southern Conference men's basketball tournament, held at the Richmond Arena. However, William & Mary fell to VPI in the quarterfinals.

== Program notes ==
- William & Mary played two teams for the first time this season: Lafayette and Columbia.

== Schedule ==
Date time, TV	Rank^{#}	Opponent^{#}	Result	Record	Site city, state
Regular season
11/30/1956		The Citadel	W 87–74	1–0 (1–0)	Blow Gymnasium; Williamsburg, VA
12/1/1956*		Hampden–Sydney	W 98–81	2–0	Blow Gymnasium; Williamsburg, VA
12/3/1956		The Citadel	W 82–74	3–0 (2–0)	Blow Gymnasium; Williamsburg, VA
12/6/1956		at Washington and Lee	L 72–79	3–1 (2–1)	Doremus Gymnasium; Lexington, VA
12/8/1956		George Washington	W 89–85	4–1 (3–1)	Blow Gymnasium; Williamsburg, VA
12/11/1956		at Furman	L 66–69	4–2 (3–2)	Old Textile Hall; Greenville, SC
12/15/1956*		at Villanova	L 73–81	4–3	Villanova Field House; Villanova, PA
12/27/1956*		vs. Lafayette; UR Invitational	L 72–85	4–4	Richmond Arena; Richmond, VA
12/28/1956*		vs. Columbia; UR Invitational	L 78–93	4–5	Richmond Arena; Richmond, VA
12/29/1956*		vs. Davidson; UR Invitational	W 72–63	5–5	Richmond Arena; Richmond, VA
1/1/1957*		at No. 12 Tennessee	L 68–81	5–6	Alumni Memorial Gym; Knoxville, TN
1/2/1957*		at No. 9 Vanderbilt	L 65–80	5–7	Memorial Gymnasium; Nashville, TN
1/5/1957		at Davidson	W 80–67	6–7 (4–2)	Johnston Gym; Davidson, NC
1/8/1957*		No. 2 North Carolina	L 61–71	6–8	Blow Gymnasium; Williamsburg, VA
1/12/1957		at Richmond	W 80–67	6–9 (4–3)	Richmond Arena; Richmond, VA
1/14/1957		vs. No. 15 West Virginia	L 72–81	6–10 (4–4)	Norfolk, VA
1/18/1957		VPI	W 72–70	7–10 (5–4)	Blow Gymnasium; Williamsburg, VA
2/2/1957		Davidson	L 77–86	7–11 (5–5)	Blow Gymnasium; Williamsburg, VA
2/4/1957		Furman	L 78–80	7–12 (5–6)	Blow Gymnasium; Williamsburg, VA
2/9/1957		at George Washington	L 77–79	7–13 (5–7)	Uline Arena; Washington, DC
12/14/1957		VMI	W 83–66	8–13 (6–7)	Blow Gymnasium; Williamsburg, VA
12/16/1957		at VPI	L 83–94	8–14 (6–8)	War Memorial Gymnasium; Blacksburg, VA
12/18/1957		at VMI	W 65–58	9–14 (7–8)	Cormack Field House; Lexington, VA
12/22/1957		Washington and Lee	L 58–80	9–15 (7–9)	Blow Gymnasium; Williamsburg, VA
2/25/1957		at West Virginia	L 57–80	9–16 (7–10)	WVU Field House; Morgantown, WV
3/2/1957		Richmond	L 73–82	9–17 (7–11)	Blow Gymnasium; Williamsburg, VA
1957 Southern Conference Basketball Tournament
3/7/1957		vs. (3) VPI; Quarterfinals	L 56–64	9–18	Richmond Arena; Richmond, VA
*Non-conference game. ^{#}Rankings from AP Poll. (#) Tournament seedings in parentheses.
