= 1953–54 William & Mary Indians men's basketball team =

American college basketball season

1953–54 William & Mary Indians men's basketball
- Conference: Southern Conference
- Record: 9–14 (6–5 SoCon)
- Head coach: Boydson Baird (2nd season)
- Home arena: Blow Gymnasium

1953–54 Southern Conference men's basketball standings
	Conf.				Overall
Team	W		L	PCT	W		L	PCT
No. 12 George Washington †	10	–	0	1.000	23	–	3	.885
Furman	6	–	1	.857	23	–	9	.719
Richmond	10	–	3	.769	23	–	8	.742
West Virginia	6	–	4	.600	12	–	11	.522
William & Mary	6	–	5	.545	9	–	14	.391
VMI	6	–	7	.462	11	–	12	.478
Davidson	3	–	5	.375	7	–	15	.318
Washington and Lee	3	–	9	.250	6	–	17	.261
Virginia Tech	3	–	13	.188	3	–	24	.111
The Citadel	1	–	7	.125	2	–	17	.105
† Southern Conference Tournament winner Rankings from AP Poll

The 1953–54 William & Mary Indians men's basketball team represented the College of William & Mary in intercollegiate basketball during the 1953–54 NCAA men's basketball season. Under the second year of head coach Boydson Baird, the team finished the season 9–14, 6–5 in the Southern Conference. This was the 49th season of the collegiate basketball program at William & Mary, whose nickname is now the Tribe. William & Mary played its home games at Blow Gymnasium.

The Indians finished in 5th place in the conference and qualified for the 1954 Southern Conference men's basketball tournament, held at the WVU Field House in Morgantown, West Virginia. However, the Indians fell to West Virginia in the quarterfinals.

== Program notes ==
- Following the previous season, seven of William & Mary's Southern Conference co-members departed for the new Atlantic Coast Conference: Clemson, Duke, Maryland, North Carolina, North Carolina State, South Carolina, and Wake Forest. As such, only 10 teams remained in the Southern Conference during the 1953–54 season.

== Schedule ==
Date time, TV	Rank^{#}	Opponent^{#}	Result	Record	Site city, state
Regular season
*		at Hampden–Sydney	W 78–58	1–0	Hampden Sydney, VA
12/8/1953*		at Maryland	L 54–69	1–1	Ritchie Coliseum; College Park, MD
*		at North Carolina	L 61–71	1–2	Woollen Gymnasium; Chapel Hill, NC
2/12/1953*		at Duke	L 44–109	1–3	Duke Indoor Stadium; Durham, NC
		George Washington	L 53–65	1–4 (0–1)	Blow Gymnasium; Williamsburg, VA
1/1/1954*		at Seton Hall	W 57–55	2–4	Walsh Gymnasium; South Orange, NJ
*		Clemson	L 72–75	2–5	Blow Gymnasium; Williamsburg, VA
*		Hampden–Sydney	W 78–65	3–5	Blow Gymnasium; Williamsburg, VA
1/9/1954		at West Virginia	W 78–76	4–5 (1–1)	WVU Field House; Morgantown, WV
		VMI	W 71–67	5–5 (2–1)	Blow Gymnasium; Williamsburg, VA
1/16/1954		at Richmond	L 73–85	5–6 (2–2)	Benedictine High School Gymnasium; Richmond, VA
		VPI	W 82–66	6–6 (3–2)	Blow Gymnasium; Williamsburg, VA
2/2/1954*		at NC State	L 70–80	6–7	Reynolds Coliseum; Raleigh, NC
2/6/1954		at Washington and Lee	W 73–58	7–7 (4–2)	Doremus Gymnasium; Lexington, VA
2/8/1954		at VPI	W 66–52	8–7 (5–2)	War Memorial Gymnasium; Blacksburg, VA
		at VMI	L 62–81	8–8 (5–3)	Cormack Field House; Lexington, VA
2/13/1954*		at No. 19 NC State	L 48–65	8–9	Reynolds Coliseum; Raleigh, NC
		at No. 8 George Washington	L 58–69	8–10 (5–4)	Washington, DC
		Washington and Lee	W 68–54	9–10 (6–4)	Blow Gymnasium; Williamsburg, VA
2/20/1954*		Wake Forest	L 56–57 ^{OT}	9–11	Blow Gymnasium; Williamsburg, VA
2/25/1954*		No. 11 Maryland	L 55–74	9–12	Blow Gymnasium; Williamsburg, VA
2/27/1954		at Richmond	L 63–68	9–13 (6–5)	Benedictine High School Gymnasium; Richmond, VA
1954 Southern Conference Basketball Tournament
3/4/1954		vs. (4) West Virginia; Quarterfinals	L 69–84	9–14	WVU Field House; Morgantown, WV
*Non-conference game. ^{#}Rankings from AP Poll. (#) Tournament seedings in parentheses.
