= The Citadel Bulldogs basketball, 1950–1959 =

The Citadel Bulldogs basketball teams represented The Citadel, The Military College of South Carolina in Charleston, South Carolina, United States. The program was established in 1900–01, and has continuously fielded a team since 1912–13. Their primary rivals are College of Charleston, Furman and VMI.

== 1949–50 ==
1949–50 The Citadel Bulldogs men's basketball
- Conference: Southern Conference
- Record: 4–16 (2–10 SoCon)
- Head coach: Bernard O'Neil
- Home arena: The Citadel Armory

1949–50 Southern Conference men's basketball standings
	Conf.				Overall
Team	W		L	PCT	W		L	PCT
No. 5 NC State †	12	–	2	.857	27	–	6	.818
William & Mary	12	–	4	.750	23	–	9	.719
George Washington	12	–	4	.750	17	–	8	.680
South Carolina	12	–	5	.706	13	–	9	.591
North Carolina	13	–	6	.684	17	–	12	.586
Virginia Tech	9	–	5	.643	16	–	9	.640
Wake Forest	11	–	8	.579	14	–	16	.467
Duke	9	–	7	.563	15	–	15	.500
Clemson	8	–	8	.500	10	–	10	.500
Davidson	6	–	12	.333	10	–	16	.385
Furman	4	–	8	.333	9	–	12	.429
Washington and Lee	4	–	9	.308	8	–	12	.400
Maryland	5	–	13	.278	7	–	18	.280
Richmond	4	–	13	.235	8	–	16	.333
The Citadel	2	–	10	.167	4	–	16	.200
VMI	2	–	11	.154	4	–	17	.190
† 1950 Southern Conference tournament winner As of April 30, 1950; Rankings from AP Poll

Date time, TV	Opponent	Result	Record	Site city, state
December 30*	Parris Island Marines	L 55–64	0–1	The Citadel Armory; Charleston, South Carolina
January 7*	Presbyterian	L 64–66	0–2	The Citadel Armory; Charleston, South Carolina
January 9*	at Camp Lejeune	W 58–56	1–2	Jacksonville, North Carolina
January 13	South Carolina	L 46–67	1–3 (0–1)	The Citadel Armory; Charleston, South Carolina
January 14*	at Parris Island Marines	L 46–49	1–4	Parris Island, South Carolina
January 17	at Furman	L 23–40	1–5 (0–2)	Greenville, South Carolina
January 18	at Clemson	L 38–63	1–6 (0–3)	Clemson Field House; Clemson, South Carolina
January 27*	Newberry	L 47–55	1–7	The Citadel Armory; Charleston, South Carolina
January 28	Furman	W 52–48	2–7 (1–3)	The Citadel Armory; Charleston, South Carolina
January 30	at North Carolina	L 39–77	2–8 (1–4)	Woollen Gymnasium; Chapel Hill, North Carolina
January 31	at Wake Forest	L 43–82	2–9 (1–5)	Wake Forest, North Carolina
February 3	Davidson	W 41–34	3–9 (2–5)	The Citadel Armory; Charleston, South Carolina
February 4	Clemson	L 34–59	3–10 (2–6)	The Citadel Armory; Charleston, South Carolina
February 7	at Duke	L 39–65	3–11 (2–7)	Duke Indoor Stadium; Durham, North Carolina
February 13*	at Presbyterian	L 42–56	3–12	Clinton, South Carolina
February 17*	North Georgia	W 54–43	4–12	The Citadel Armory; Charleston, South Carolina
February 18	Wake Forest	L 57–62	4–13 (2–8)	The Citadel Armory; Charleston, South Carolina
February 21	at South Carolina	L 42–68	4–14 (2–9)	Columbia, South Carolina
February 24*	at Newberry	L 56–83	4–15	Newberry, South Carolina
February 25	at Davidson	L 48–87	4–16 (2–10)	Johnston Gym; Davidson, North Carolina
*Non-conference game. (#) Tournament seedings in parentheses. All times are in Eastern Time.

== 1950–51 ==
1950–51 The Citadel Bulldogs men's basketball
- Conference: Southern Conference
- Record: 6–11 (2–7 SoCon)
- Head coach: Bernard O'Neil
- Home arena: The Citadel Armory

1950–51 Southern Conference men's basketball standings
	Conf.				Overall
Team	W		L	PCT	W		L	PCT
No. 8 North Carolina State †	13	–	1	.929	30	–	7	.811
West Virginia	9	–	3	.750	18	–	9	.667
Clemson	9	–	4	.692	11	–	7	.611
William & Mary	13	–	6	.684	20	–	11	.645
Duke	13	–	6	.684	20	–	13	.606
Virginia Tech	9	–	5	.643	19	–	10	.655
South Carolina	12	–	7	.632	13	–	12	.520
Maryland	11	–	8	.579	15	–	10	.600
North Carolina	9	–	8	.529	12	–	15	.444
Wake Forest	8	–	9	.471	16	–	14	.533
George Washington	8	–	9	.471	12	–	12	.500
Richmond	5	–	10	.333	7	–	14	.333
Washington and Lee	5	–	13	.278	8	–	17	.320
VMI	3	–	11	.214	3	–	18	.143
Davidson	5	–	15	.250	7	–	19	.269
The Citadel	2	–	7	.222	6	–	11	.353
Furman	1	–	13	.071	3	–	20	.130
† Southern Conference Tournament winner Rankings from AP Poll

Date time, TV	Opponent	Result	Record	Site city, state
January 6	Davidson	L 52–55	0–1 (0–1)	The Citadel Armory; Charleston, South Carolina
January 12*	at Piedmont	W 67–55	1–1	Demorest, Georgia
January 13*	at North Georgia	L 55–57	1–2	Dahlonega, Georgia
January 15	at South Carolina	L 45–79	1–3 (0–2)	Columbia, South Carolina
January 18*	at Newberry	L 85–91	1–4	Newberry, South Carolina
January 19	at Furman	W 62–54	2–4 (1–2)	Greenville, South Carolina
January 20	at Clemson	L 43–69	2–5 (1–3)	Clemson Field House; Clemson, South Carolina
February 2*	at Presbyterian	L 72–74	2–6	Clinton, South Carolina
February 3	at Davidson	L 49–69	2–7 (1–4)	Johnston Gym; Davidson, North Carolina
February 9	Furman	W 61–54	3–7 (2–4)	The Citadel Armory; Charleston, South Carolina
February 10	North Carolina	L 53–71	3–8 (2–5)	The Citadel Armory; Charleston, South Carolina
February 13	Newberry	W 69–57	4–8	The Citadel Armory; Charleston, South Carolina
February 16	at Grove Cove Navy	L 45–67	4–9	Green Cove Springs, Florida
February 17*	at Stetson	W 63–61	5–9	DeLand, Florida
February 20	South Carolina	L 58–82	5–10 (2–6)	The Citadel Armory; Charleston, South Carolina
February 23	Presbyterian	W 75–69	6–10	The Citadel Armory; Charleston, South Carolina
February 24	Clemson	L 57–73	6–11 (2–7)	The Citadel Armory; Charleston, South Carolina
*Non-conference game. (#) Tournament seedings in parentheses. All times are in Eastern Time.

== 1951–52 ==
1951–52 The Citadel Bulldogs men's basketball
- Conference: Southern Conference
- Record: 8–21 (1–11 SoCon)
- Head coach: Bernard O'Neil
- Home arena: The Citadel Armory

1951–52 Southern Conference men's basketball standings
	Conf.				Overall
Team	W		L	PCT	W		L	PCT
No. 9 West Virginia	15	–	1	.938	23	–	4	.852
North Carolina State †	12	–	2	.857	24	–	10	.706
No. 12 Duke	13	–	3	.813	24	–	6	.800
Clemson	11	–	4	.733	17	–	7	.708
George Washington	12	–	6	.667	15	–	9	.625
Maryland	9	–	5	.643	13	–	9	.591
Furman	9	–	5	.643	18	–	6	.750
William & Mary	10	–	6	.625	15	–	13	.536
South Carolina	8	–	7	.533	14	–	10	.583
Wake Forest	7	–	9	.438	10	–	19	.345
North Carolina	8	–	11	.421	12	–	15	.444
Virginia Tech	3	–	10	.231	4	–	16	.200
Richmond	3	–	11	.214	7	–	15	.318
Washington and Lee	3	–	11	.214	6	–	21	.222
Davidson	4	–	15	.211	7	–	18	.280
VMI	2	–	13	.133	3	–	21	.125
The Citadel	1	–	11	.083	8	–	20	.286
† Southern Conference Tournament winner Rankings from AP Poll

Date time, TV	Opponent	Result	Record	Site city, state
December 1	North Carolina	L 69–87	0–1 (0–1)	The Citadel Armory; Charleston, South Carolina
December 3*	Charleston Navy Base	W 90–37	1–1	The Citadel Armory; Charleston, South Carolina
December 6	at South Carolina	L 56–76	1–2 (0–2)	Columbia, South Carolina
December 15*	at Erskine	W 68–59	2–2	Due West, South Carolina
December 17*	at Morehead State	L 45–78	2–3	Morehead, Kentucky
December 18*	at Elon	L 49–81	2–4	Alumni Gym; Elon, North Carolina
December 19*	at Enks	L 49–64	2–5	
December 20*	at High Point	L 48–53	2–6	High Point, North Carolina
January 4*	Presbyterian	L 58–63	2–7	The Citadel Armory; Charleston, South Carolina
January 5*	Piedmont	W 62–54	3–7	The Citadel Armory; Charleston, South Carolina
January 7*	Erskine	W 56–50	4–7	The Citadel Armory; Charleston, South Carolina
January 11	at Davidson	L 66–100	4–8 (0–3)	Johnston Gym; Davidson, North Carolina
January 12	at Clemson	L 59–89	4–9 (0–4)	Clemson Field House; Clemson, South Carolina
January 15*	Newberry	W 73–50	5–9	The Citadel Armory; Charleston, South Carolina
January 19	at Furman	L 53–76	5–10 (0–5)	Greenville, South Carolina
January 23*	Charleston Navy Base	L 55–74	5–11	The Citadel Armory; Charleston, South Carolina
January 25	Furman	L 63–86	5–12 (0–6)	The Citadel Armory; Charleston, South Carolina
January 26	Clemson	L 63–66	5–13 (0–7)	The Citadel Armory; Charleston, South Carolina
January 29*	at Presbyterian	L 50–89	5–14	Clinton, South Carolina
January 30*	at Newberry	W 65–58	6–14	Newberry, South Carolina
February 2	South Carolina	L 59–76	6–15 (0–8)	The Citadel Armory; Charleston, South Carolina
February 6	George Washington	L 64–73	6–16 (0–9)	The Citadel Armory; Charleston, South Carolina
February 8	at North Carolina	L 62–80	6–17 (0–10)	Woollen Gymnasium; Chapel Hill, North Carolina
February 11*	at Wofford	L 69–70	6–18	Spartanburg, South Carolina
February 15*	Wofford	W 74–65	7–18	The Citadel Armory; Charleston, South Carolina
February 16	Davidson	W 62–52	8–18 (1–10)	The Citadel Armory; Charleston, South Carolina
February 22*	at East Carolina	L 71–87	8–19	Greenville, North Carolina
February 23	at George Washington	L 56–78	8–20 (1–11)	Washington, D.C.
February 25*	at Cherry Point	L 50–64	8–21	Havelock, North Carolina
*Non-conference game. (#) Tournament seedings in parentheses. All times are in Eastern Time.

== 1952–53 ==
1952–53 The Citadel Bulldogs men's basketball
- Conference: Southern Conference
- Record: 4–14 (0–11 SoCon)
- Head coach: Leo Zack
- Home arena: The Citadel Armory

1952–53 Southern Conference men's basketball standings
	Conf.				Overall
Team	W		L	PCT	W		L	PCT
No. 18 North Carolina State	13	–	3	.813	26	–	6	.813
No. 15 Wake Forest †	12	–	3	.800	19	–	6	.760
Maryland	12	–	3	.800	15	–	8	.652
West Virginia	11	–	3	.786	19	–	17	.528
Furman	10	–	3	.769	21	–	6	.778
Duke	12	–	4	.750	17	–	8	.680
Richmond	13	–	5	.722	21	–	7	.750
North Carolina	15	–	6	.714	17	–	10	.630
George Washington	12	–	6	.667	15	–	7	.682
Clemson	6	–	8	.429	8	–	10	.444
South Carolina	7	–	12	.368	11	–	13	.458
William & Mary	6	–	13	.316	10	–	13	.435
Virginia Tech	4	–	13	.235	4	–	19	.174
Davidson	3	–	14	.176	4	–	16	.200
VMI	1	–	14	.067	5	–	19	.208
Washington and Lee	1	–	17	.056	2	–	20	.091
The Citadel	0	–	11	.000	4	–	14	.222
† Southern Conference Tournament winner Rankings from AP Poll

Date time, TV	Opponent	Result	Record	Site city, state
November 30	at North Carolina	L 50–70	0–1 (0–1)	Woollen Gymnasium; Chapel Hill, North Carolina
January 9*	Wofford	L 71–85	0–2	The Citadel Armory; Charleston, South Carolina
January 10	Wake Forest	L 67–96	0–3 (0–2)	The Citadel Armory; Charleston, South Carolina
January 16	Furman	L 72–96	0–4 (0–3)	The Citadel Armory; Charleston, South Carolina
January 17	Clemson	L 58–64	0–5 (0–4)	The Citadel Armory; Charleston, South Carolina
January 23	at Clemson	L 50–79	0–6 (0–5)	Clemson Field House; Clemson, South Carolina
January 24	at Furman	L 68–107	0–7 (0–6)	Greenville, South Carolina
January 30*	at Newberry	W 74–61	1–7	Newberry, South Carolina
January 31	Piedmont	W 95–67	2–7	The Citadel Armory; Charleston, South Carolina
February 4*	at Wofford	L 62–96	2–8	Spartanburg, South Carolina
February 7	Davidson	L 64–81	2–9 (0–7)	The Citadel Armory; Charleston, South Carolina
February 11*	at Presbyterian	L 63–82	2–10	Clinton, South Carolina
February 14	North Carolina	L 69–94	2–11 (0–8)	The Citadel Armory; Charleston, South Carolina
February 17	Presbyterian	W 72–63	3–11	The Citadel Armory; Charleston, South Carolina
February 19	at Davidson	L 59–68	3–12 (0–9)	Johnston Gym; Davidson, North Carolina
February 21*	Newberry	W 67–57	4–12	The Citadel Armory; Charleston, South Carolina
February 27	at South Carolina	L 59–78	4–13 (0–10)	Columbia, South Carolina
February 28	South Carolina	L 72–97	4–14 (0–11)	The Citadel Armory; Charleston, South Carolina
*Non-conference game. (#) Tournament seedings in parentheses. All times are in Eastern Time.

== 1953–54 ==
1953–54 The Citadel Bulldogs men's basketball
- Conference: Southern Conference
- Record: 2–18 (1–7 SoCon)
- Head coach: Leo Zack
- Home arena: The Citadel Armory

1953–54 Southern Conference men's basketball standings
	Conf.				Overall
Team	W		L	PCT	W		L	PCT
No. 12 George Washington †	10	–	0	1.000	23	–	3	.885
Furman	6	–	1	.857	23	–	9	.719
Richmond	10	–	3	.769	23	–	8	.742
West Virginia	6	–	4	.600	12	–	11	.522
William & Mary	6	–	5	.545	9	–	14	.391
VMI	6	–	7	.462	11	–	12	.478
Davidson	3	–	5	.375	7	–	15	.318
Washington and Lee	3	–	9	.250	6	–	17	.261
Virginia Tech	3	–	13	.188	3	–	24	.111
The Citadel	1	–	7	.125	2	–	17	.105
† Southern Conference Tournament winner Rankings from AP Poll

Date time, TV	Opponent	Result	Record	Site city, state
January 8*	at North Carolina	L 42–83	0–1	Woollen Gymnasium; Chapel Hill, North Carolina
January 9	at Davidson	L 51–82	0–2 (0–1)	Johnston Gym; Davidson, North Carolina
January 13*	MinLant	L 53–56	0–3	The Citadel Armory; Charleston, South Carolina
January 15*	Newberry	W 71–60	1–3	The Citadel Armory; Charleston, South Carolina
January 16*	Clemson	L 52–76	1–4	The Citadel Armory; Charleston, South Carolina
January 22*	Piedmont	L 55–79	1–5	The Citadel Armory; Charleston, South Carolina
January 23	Furman	L 63–91	1–6 (0–2)	The Citadel Armory; Charleston, South Carolina
January 29*	at Clemson	L 55–78	1–7	Clemson Field House; Clemson, South Carolina
January 30	at Furman	L 72–114	1–8 (0–3)	Greenville, South Carolina
February 5	VMI	L 57–77	1–9 (0–4)	The Citadel Armory; Charleston, South Carolina
February 6*	Presbyterian	L 46–75	1–10	The Citadel Armory; Charleston, South Carolina
February 12*	South Carolina	L 59–79	1–11	The Citadel Armory; Charleston, South Carolina
February 13	Davidson	W 75–70	2–11 (1–4)	The Citadel Armory; Charleston, South Carolina
February 19*	at Newberry	L 75–82	2–12	Newberry, South Carolina
February 20*	at Presbyterian	L 73–106	2–13	Clinton, South Carolina
February 22	at VMI	L 55–91	2–14 (1–5)	Cormack Field House; Lexington, Virginia
February 23	at Washington and Lee	L 55–84	2–15 (1–6)	Lexington, Virginia
February 24	at Virginia Tech	L 70–85	2–16 (1–7)	War Memorial Gymnasium; Blacksburg, Virginia
February 26*	at South Carolina	L 74–79	2–17	Columbia, South Carolina
February 27*	North Carolina	L 52–79	2–18	The Citadel Armory; Charleston, South Carolina
*Non-conference game. (#) Tournament seedings in parentheses. All times are in Eastern Time.

== 1954–55 ==
1954–55 The Citadel Bulldogs men's basketball
- Conference: Southern Conference
- Record: 1–18 (0–10 SoCon)
- Head coach: Jim Browning
- Home arena: The Citadel Armory

1954–55 Southern Conference men's basketball standings
	Conf.				Overall
Team	W		L	PCT	W		L	PCT
No. 19 West Virginia †	9	–	1	.900	19	–	11	.633
No. 14 George Washington	8	–	2	.800	24	–	6	.800
Richmond	10	–	4	.714	19	–	9	.679
Washington and Lee	8	–	5	.615	16	–	13	.552
Furman	6	–	4	.600	17	–	10	.630
William & Mary	7	–	5	.583	11	–	14	.440
Davidson	4	–	6	.400	8	–	13	.381
VMI	4	–	9	.308	8	–	15	.348
Virginia Tech	4	–	14	.222	7	–	20	.259
The Citadel	0	–	10	.000	0	–	17	.000
† Southern Conference Tournament winner Rankings from AP Poll

Southern Conference record books do not include The Citadel's home games against Jacksonville NAS or Parris Island Marines. The Citadel counts these two games towards its records, but does not count earlier road games against non-collegiate competition (Gibbs AAU, Jacksonville NAS and Parris Island Marines). The result of this difference is that The Citadel counts one additional win and one additional loss for the 1954–55 season, while the Southern Conference does not.

Date time, TV	Opponent	Result	Record	Site city, state
December 10	Davidson	L 51–70	0–1 (0–1)	The Citadel Armory; Charleston, South Carolina
December 13	Virginia Tech	L 69–91	0–2 (0–2)	The Citadel Armory; Charleston, South Carolina
December 15*	at Gibbs AAU	L 65–121	exh.	
December 16*	at Rollins	L 71–84	0–3	Winter Park, Florida
December 17*	at Jacksonville NAS	L 90–94	exh.	Jacksonville, Florida
December 18*	at Parris Island Marines	L 54–125	exh.	Parris Island, South Carolina
January 7	at Davidson	L 66–87	0–4 (0–3)	Johnston Gym; Davidson, North Carolina
January 8	at Furman	L 67–154	0–5 (0–4)	Greenville, South Carolina
January 14*	Presbyterian	L 72–93	0–6	The Citadel Armory; Charleston, South Carolina
January 15*	Wofford	L 74–100	0–7	The Citadel Armory; Charleston, South Carolina
January 21*	South Carolina	L 72–97	0–8	The Citadel Armory; Charleston, South Carolina
February 3*	at South Carolina	L 65–97	0–9	Columbia, South Carolina
February 5	Washington and Lee	L 53–70	0–10 (0–5)	The Citadel Armory; Charleston, South Carolina
February 7	VMI	L 59–78	0–11 (0–6)	The Citadel Armory; Charleston, South Carolina
February 11*	Jacksonville NAS	W 86–80	1–11	The Citadel Armory; Charleston, South Carolina
February 12	Furman	L 24–26	1–12 (0–7)	The Citadel Armory; Charleston, South Carolina
February 18*	at Newberry	L 63–80	1–13	Newberry, South Carolina
February 19*	at Wofford	L 72–94	1–14	Spartanburg, South Carolina
February 21	at Virginia Tech	L 53–88	1–15 (0–8)	Blacksburg, Virginia
February 22	at Washington and Lee	L 50–89	1–16 (0–9)	Lexington, Virginia
February 23	at VMI	L 62–88	1–17 (0–10)	Cormack Field House; Lexington, Virginia
February 26*	Parris Island Marines	L 70–92	1–18	The Citadel Armory; Charleston, South Carolina
*Non-conference game. (#) Tournament seedings in parentheses. All times are in Eastern Time.

== 1955–56 ==
1955–56 The Citadel Bulldogs men's basketball
- Conference: Southern Conference
- Record: 2–19 (0–10 SoCon)
- Head coach: Hank Witt
- Home arena: The Citadel Armory

1955–56 Southern Conference men's basketball standings
	Conf.				Overall
Team	W		L	PCT	W		L	PCT
George Washington	10	–	2	.833	19	–	7	.731
No. 20 West Virginia †	10	–	2	.833	21	–	9	.700
Virginia Tech	10	–	7	.588	14	–	11	.560
Richmond	8	–	6	.571	16	–	13	.552
William & Mary	9	–	7	.563	12	–	14	.462
Furman	7	–	7	.500	12	–	16	.429
Davidson	5	–	7	.417	10	–	15	.400
Washington and Lee	5	–	8	.385	12	–	16	.429
VMI	3	–	11	.214	4	–	19	.174
The Citadel	0	–	10	.000	2	–	19	.095
† Southern Conference Tournament winner Rankings from AP Poll

Date time, TV	Opponent	Result	Record	Site city, state
December 1*	at South Carolina	L 50–80	0–1	Columbia, South Carolina
December 3*	Presbyterian	L 67–117	0–2	The Citadel Armory; Charleston, South Carolina
December 10	Davidson	L 64–93	0–3 (0–1)	The Citadel Armory; Charleston, South Carolina
December 12	Virginia Tech	L 64–97	0–4 (0–2)	The Citadel Armory; Charleston, South Carolina
December 15*	College of Charleston	W 56–52	1–4	The Citadel Armory; Charleston, South Carolina
December 17	Furman	L 61–90	1–5 (0–3)	The Citadel Armory; Charleston, South Carolina
January 5*	at Newberry	L 56–81	1–6	Newberry, South Carolina
January 6	at Davidson	L 59–65	1–7 (0–4)	Johnston Gym; Davidson, North Carolina
January 13*	Wofford	L 61–90	1–8	The Citadel Armory; Charleston, South Carolina
January 14	at Furman	L 68–113	1–9 (0–5)	The Citadel Armory; Charleston, South Carolina
January 30*	Clemson	L 70–86	1–10	The Citadel Armory; Charleston, South Carolina
February 3	VMI	L 59–76	1–11 (0–6)	The Citadel Armory; Charleston, South Carolina
February 4	South Carolina	L 76–121	1–12	The Citadel Armory; Charleston, South Carolina
February 6*	at Clemson	L 69–114	1–13	Clemson Field House; Clemson, South Carolina
February 10*	Newberry	W 82–78	2–13	The Citadel Armory; Charleston, South Carolina
February 11	Washington and Lee	L 67–99	2–14 (0–7)	The Citadel Armory; Charleston, South Carolina
February 18*	at Wofford	L 68–100	2–15	Spartanburg, South Carolina
February 20	at Washington and Lee	L 54–91	2–16 (0–8)	Lexington, Virginia
February 21	at VMI	L 59–90	2–17 (0–9)	Cormack Field House; Lexington, Virginia
February 23	at Virginia Tech	L 47–103	2–18 (0–10)	War Memorial Gymnasium; Blacksburg, Virginia
February 25*	at Presbyterian	L 63–113	2–19	Clinton, South Carolina
*Non-conference game. (#) Tournament seedings in parentheses. All times are in Eastern Time.

== 1956–57 ==
1956–57 The Citadel Bulldogs men's basketball
- Conference: Southern Conference
- Record: 11–14 (5–9 SoCon)
- Head coach: Norm Sloan
- Home arena: The Citadel Armory

1956–57 Southern Conference men's basketball standings
	Conf.				Overall
Team	W		L	PCT	W		L	PCT
No. 7 West Virginia †	12	–	0	1.000	25	–	5	.833
Washington and Lee	10	–	3	.769	20	–	7	.741
Virginia Tech	12	–	5	.706	14	–	8	.636
Furman	7	–	5	.583	10	–	17	.370
Richmond	9	–	7	.563	15	–	11	.577
William & Mary	7	–	11	.389	9	–	18	.333
The Citadel	5	–	9	.357	11	–	14	.440
Davidson	4	–	8	.333	7	–	20	.259
George Washington	3	–	9	.250	3	–	21	.125
VMI	1	–	13	.071	4	–	22	.154
† Southern Conference Tournament winner Rankings from AP Poll

Date time, TV	Opponent	Result	Record	Site city, state
November 30	at William & Mary	L 74–87	0–1 (0–1)	Williamsburg, Virginia
December 2	at Richmond	L 69–91	0–2 (0–2)	Richmond Arena; Richmond, Virginia
December 3	at William & Mary	L 74–82	0–3 (0–3)	Williamsburg, Virginia
December 8	Davidson	W 63–62	1–3 (1–3)	The Citadel Armory; Charleston, South Carolina
December 10*	at Presbyterian	L 73–82	1–4	Clinton, South Carolina
December 15*	Clemson	W 71–66	2–5	The Citadel Armory; Charleston, South Carolina
December 17	Virginia Tech	L 68–72	2–5 (1–4)	The Citadel Armory; Charleston, South Carolina
January 7	at VMI	W 81–71	3–5 (2–4)	Cormack Field House; Lexington, Virginia
January 8	at Washington and Lee	L 69–72	3–6 (2–5)	Lexington, Virginia
January 10	at Virginia Tech	L 72–83	3–7 (2–6)	War Memorial Gymnasium; Blacksburg, Virginia
January 12	Furman	W 77–76	3–7 (3–6)	The Citadel Armory; Charleston, South Carolina
January 28*	at South Carolina	L 77–90	4–8	Columbia, South Carolina
February 1*	Presbyterian	W 65–63	5–8	The Citadel Armory; Charleston, South Carolina
February 2*	Wofford	W 86–74	6–8	The Citadel Armory; Charleston, South Carolina
February 5*	at Newberry	W 67–55	7–8	Newberry, South Carolina
February 8	VMI	W 78–70	8–8 (4–6)	The Citadel Armory; Charleston, South Carolina
February 9	Washington and Lee	L 58–64	8–9 (4–7)	The Citadel Armory; Charleston, South Carolina
February 11	Richmond	L 54–67	8–10 (4–8)	The Citadel Armory; Charleston, South Carolina
February 15*	at Clemson	L 66–68	8–11	Clemson Field House; Clemson, South Carolina
February 16	at Furman	W 85–79	9–11 (5–8)	Greenville, South Carolina
February 19*	Newberry	W 97–63	10–11	The Citadel Armory; Charleston, South Carolina
February 22*	Wofford	W 68–62	11–11	The Citadel Armory; Charleston, South Carolina
February 23	at Davidson	L 57–60	11–12 (5–9)	Johnston Gym; Davidson, North Carolina
February 26*	South Carolina	L 96–98	11–13	The Citadel Armory; Charleston, South Carolina
1957 Southern Conference men's basketball tournament
March 7	vs. Washington and Lee	L 62–85	11–14	Richmond Arena; Richmond, Virginia
*Non-conference game. (#) Tournament seedings in parentheses. All times are in Eastern Time.

== 1957–58 ==
1957–58 The Citadel Bulldogs men's basketball
- Conference: Southern Conference
- Record: 16–11 (9–6 SoCon)
- Head coach: Norm Sloan
- Home arena: The Citadel Armory

1957–58 Southern Conference men's basketball standings
	Conf.				Overall
Team	W		L	PCT	W		L	PCT
No. 1 West Virginia †	12	–	0	1.000	26	–	2	.929
Virginia Tech	10	–	5	.667	11	–	8	.579
George Washington	8	–	4	.667	12	–	11	.522
The Citadel	9	–	6	.600	16	–	11	.593
Richmond	8	–	8	.500	14	–	12	.538
William & Mary	9	–	9	.500	15	–	14	.517
Furman	4	–	8	.333	10	–	16	.385
Davidson	4	–	8	.333	9	–	15	.375
Washington and Lee	4	–	9	.308	9	–	16	.360
VMI	1	–	12	.077	4	–	17	.190
† Southern Conference Tournament winner Rankings from AP Poll

Date time, TV	Opponent	Result	Record	Site city, state
December 2*	Newberry	W 60–46	1–0	The Citadel Armory; Charleston, South Carolina
December 6*	Presbyterian	W 81–56	2–0	The Citadel Armory; Charleston, South Carolina
December 9	William & Mary	W 75–60	3–0 (1–0)	The Citadel Armory; Charleston, South Carolina
December 10	William & Mary	W 85–63	4–0 (2–0)	The Citadel Armory; Charleston, South Carolina
December 14	Virginia Tech	W 55–54 ^{OT}	5–0 (3–0)	The Citadel Armory; Charleston, South Carolina
December 16*	at No. 20 Memphis State	L 63–70	5–1	Memorial Fieldhouse; Memphis, Tennessee
December 18*	at Vanderbilt	L 61–90	5–2	Memorial Gymnasium; Nashville, Tennessee
December 26*	at Centenary; Louisiana Invitational	L 62–87	5–3	Shreveport, Louisiana
December 27*	vs. West Texas State; Louisiana Invitational	W 79–71	6–3	Shreveport, Louisiana
December 28*	vs. Tennessee Tech; Louisiana Invitational	L 60–69	6–4	Shreveport, Louisiana
January 1*	vs. Florida State; Senior Bowl Tournament	W 59–57	7–4	Mobile, Alabama
January 2*	vs. Spring Hill; Senior Bowl Tournament	W 65–55	8–4	Mobile, Alabama
January 6	at George Washington	L 68–72	8–5 (3–1)	Washington, D.C.
January 7	at Richmond	L 50–54	8–6 (3–2)	Richmond Arena; Richmond, Virginia
January 11	Furman	W 85–69	9–6 (4–2)	The Citadel Armory; Charleston, South Carolina
January 18	at Davidson	W 61–42	10–6 (5–2)	Johnston Gym; Davidson, North Carolina
January 25*	at Clemson	W 60–57	11–6	Clemson Field House; Clemson, South Carolina
February 1*	Memphis State	W 62–54	12–6	The Citadel Armory; Charleston, South Carolina
February 7	VMI	W 77–63	13–6 (6–2)	The Citadel Armory; Charleston, South Carolina
February 8	Washington and Lee	L 68–74	13–7 (6–3)	The Citadel Armory; Charleston, South Carolina
February 10	Richmond	W 62–54	14–7 (7–3)	The Citadel Armory; Charleston, South Carolina
February 12	Davidson	W 49–42	15–7 (8–3)	The Citadel Armory; Charleston, South Carolina
February 17	at VMI	W 86–54	16–7 (9–3)	Cormack Field House; Lexington, Virginia
February 18	at Washington and Lee	L 66–72	16–8 (9–4)	Lexington, Virginia
February 20	at Virginia Tech	L 44–75	16–9 (9–5)	War Memorial Gymnasium; Blacksburg, Virginia
February 28	at Furman	L 74–90	16–10 (9–6)	Old Textile Hall; Greenville, South Carolina
1958 Southern Conference men's basketball tournament
March 6	vs. Richmond	L 59–63	16–11	Richmond Arena; Richmond, Virginia
*Non-conference game. (#) Tournament seedings in parentheses. All times are in Eastern Time.

== 1958–59 ==
1958–59 The Citadel Bulldogs men's basketball
- Conference: Southern Conference
- Record: 15–5 (7–4 SoCon)
- Head coach: Norm Sloan
- Home arena: The Citadel Armory

1958–59 Southern Conference men's basketball standings
	Conf.				Overall
Team	W		L	PCT	W		L	PCT
No. 10 West Virginia †	11	–	0	1.000	29	–	5	.853
Virginia Tech	10	–	2	.833	16	–	5	.762
The Citadel	7	–	4	.636	15	–	5	.750
William & Mary	7	–	7	.500	13	–	11	.542
Richmond	6	–	8	.429	11	–	11	.500
Furman	5	–	7	.417	14	–	12	.538
George Washington	4	–	7	.364	14	–	11	.560
Davidson	2	–	8	.200	9	–	15	.375
VMI	2	–	11	.154	5	–	13	.278
† Southern Conference Tournament winner Rankings from AP Poll

Date time, TV	Opponent	Result	Record	Site city, state
December 1	Richmond	W 55–45	1–0 (1–0)	The Citadel Armory; Charleston, South Carolina
December 6*	at Presbyterian	W 71–62	2–0	Clinton, South Carolina
December 9	at No. 4 West Virginia	L 61–89	2–1 (1–1)	WVU Field House; Morgantown, West Virginia
December 13*	Washington and Lee	W 89–69	3–1	The Citadel Armory; Charleston, South Carolina
December 19*	Georgia; Citadel Invitational	W 78–52	4–1	The Citadel Armory; Charleston, South Carolina
December 20*	Miami (FL); Citadel Invitational	W 93–77	5–1	The Citadel Armory; Charleston, South Carolina
January 6	at Richmond	L 62–69	5–2 (1–2)	Richmond Arena; Richmond, Virginia
January 10	VMI	W 47–36	6–2 (2–2)	The Citadel Armory; Charleston, South Carolina
January 17	at Davidson	W 78–72	7–2 (3–2)	Johnston Gym; Davidson, North Carolina
January 19*	Clemson	W 55–44	8–2	The Citadel Armory; Charleston, South Carolina
January 31	at Furman	W 85–80	9–2 (4–2)	Greenville Memorial Auditorium; Greenville, South Carolina
February 4	at Virginia Tech	L 69–76	9–3 (4–3)	War Memorial Gymnasium; Blacksburg, Virginia
February 6	at VMI	W 47–46	10–3 (5–3)	Cormack Field House; Lexington, Virginia
February 7	at Washington and Lee	W 66–54	11–3	Lexington, Virginia
February 13	George Washington	W 64–44	12–3 (6–3)	The Citadel Armory; Charleston, South Carolina
February 16	Furman	L 52–53	12–4 (6–4)	The Citadel Armory; Charleston, South Carolina
February 20	Davidson	W 64–60	13–4 (7–4)	The Citadel Armory; Charleston, South Carolina
1959 Southern Conference men's basketball tournament
February 26	vs. Furman	W 93–88	14–4	Richmond Arena; Richmond, Virginia
February 27	vs. George Washington	W 53–52	15–4	Richmond Arena; Richmond, Virginia
February 28	vs. No. 10 West Virginia	L 66–85	15–5	Richmond Arena; Richmond, Virginia
*Non-conference game. (#) Tournament seedings in parentheses. All times are in Eastern Time.
