= 1952–53 William & Mary Indians men's basketball team =

American college basketball season

1952–53 William & Mary Indians men's basketball
- Conference: Southern Conference
- Record: 10–13 (6–13 SoCon)
- Head coach: Boydson Baird (1st season)
- Home arena: Blow Gymnasium

1952–53 Southern Conference men's basketball standings
	Conf.				Overall
Team	W		L	PCT	W		L	PCT
No. 18 North Carolina State	13	–	3	.813	26	–	6	.813
No. 15 Wake Forest †	12	–	3	.800	19	–	6	.760
Maryland	12	–	3	.800	15	–	8	.652
West Virginia	11	–	3	.786	19	–	17	.528
Furman	10	–	3	.769	21	–	6	.778
Duke	12	–	4	.750	17	–	8	.680
Richmond	13	–	5	.722	21	–	7	.750
North Carolina	15	–	6	.714	17	–	10	.630
George Washington	12	–	6	.667	15	–	7	.682
Clemson	6	–	8	.429	8	–	10	.444
South Carolina	7	–	12	.368	11	–	13	.458
William & Mary	6	–	13	.316	10	–	13	.435
Virginia Tech	4	–	13	.235	4	–	19	.174
Davidson	3	–	14	.176	4	–	16	.200
VMI	1	–	14	.067	5	–	19	.208
Washington and Lee	1	–	17	.056	2	–	20	.091
The Citadel	0	–	11	.000	4	–	14	.222
† Southern Conference Tournament winner Rankings from AP Poll

The 1952–53 William & Mary Indians men's basketball team represented the College of William & Mary in intercollegiate basketball during the 1952–53 NCAA men's basketball season. Under the first year of head coach Boydson Baird, the team finished the season 10–13 and 6–13 in the Southern Conference. This was the 48th season of the collegiate basketball program at William & Mary, whose nickname is now the Tribe. William & Mary played its home games at Blow Gymnasium.

The Indians finished in 12th place in the conference and failed to qualify for the Southern Conference men's basketball tournament, the first such occurrence since 1947.

== Program notes ==
- On February 14, 1953, Bill Chambers set the NCAA record for highest single game rebound total (51) in a game against Virginia,
- Boydson Baird came to William & Mary after three seasons at Davidson, where he had a 24–53 record.
- Bill Chambers was named to the second team all-Southern Conference for the second straight season.
- Following the 1952–53 season, seven of William & Mary's Southern Conference co-members departed for the new Atlantic Coast Conference: Clemson, Duke, Maryland, North Carolina, North Carolina State, South Carolina, and Wake Forest.

== Schedule ==
Date time, TV	Rank^{#}	Opponent^{#}	Result	Record	Site city, state
Regular season
12/3/1952		at George Washington	L 79–90	0–1 (0–1)	Washington, DC
12/4/1952		at Maryland	L 61–64	0–2 (0–2)	Ritchie Coliseum; College Park, MD
		at Washington and Lee	W 87–62	1–2 (1–2)	Doremus Gymnasium; Lexington, VA
12/13/1952*		at Virginia	W 87–71	2–2	Memorial Gymnasium; Charlottesville, VA
12/17/1952		West Virginia	L 100–101 ^{OT}	2–3 (1–3)	Blow Gymnasium; Williamsburg, VA
*		Winston–Salem Bullets	W 82–63	3–3	Blow Gymnasium; Williamsburg, VA
		at Clemson	L 71–81	3–4 (1–4)	Clemson Field House; Clemson, SC
1/3/1953		at Furman	L 78–85	3–5 (1–5)	Old Textile Hall; Greenville, SC
*		Hampden–Sydney	W 74–65	4–5	Blow Gymnasium; Williamsburg, VA
		VMI	W 88–64	5–5 (2–5)	Blow Gymnasium; Williamsburg, VA
1/13/1953		No. 8 NC State	L 58–62	5–6 (2–6)	Blow Gymnasium; Williamsburg, VA
1/17/1953		at Richmond	L 78–82	5–7 (2–7)	Benedictine High School Gymnasium; Richmond, VA
		VPI	W 91–74	6–7 (3–7)	Blow Gymnasium; Williamsburg, VA
		at VMI	W 88–54	7–7 (4–7)	Cormack Field House; Lexington, VA
2/7/1953		at No. 15 NC State	L 71–101	7–8 (4–8)	Reynolds Coliseum; Raleigh, NC
2/10/1953		vs. Wake Forest	L 76–78	7–9 (4–9)	Norfolk, VA
2/14/1953*		Virginia	W 105–84	8–9	Blow Gymnasium; Williamsburg, VA
2/17/1953		Maryland	L 57–79	8–10 (4–10)	Blow Gymnasium; Williamsburg, VA
2/19/1953		No. 18 Duke	W 85–82 ^{OT}	9–10 (5–10)	Blow Gymnasium; Williamsburg, VA
2/21/1953		Washington and Lee	W 94–73	10–10 (6–10)	Blow Gymnasium; Williamsburg, VA
		at VPI	L 74–75	10–11 (6–11)	War Memorial Gymnasium; Blacksburg, VA
		George Washington	L 63–70	10–12 (6–12)	Blow Gymnasium; Williamsburg, VA
2/28/1953		Richmond	L 70–76	10–13 (6–13)	Blow Gymnasium; Williamsburg, VA
*Non-conference game. ^{#}Rankings from AP Poll. (#) Tournament seedings in parentheses.
