= 1956 Southern Conference men's basketball tournament =

- Classification: Division I
- Season: 1955–56
- Teams: 8
- Site: Richmond Arena; Richmond, VA
- Champions: West Virginia (2nd title)
- Winning coach: Fred Schaus (2nd title)

1955–56 Southern Conference men's basketball standings
	Conf.				Overall
Team	W		L	PCT	W		L	PCT
George Washington	10	–	2	.833	19	–	7	.731
No. 20 West Virginia †	10	–	2	.833	21	–	9	.700
Virginia Tech	10	–	7	.588	14	–	11	.560
Richmond	8	–	6	.571	16	–	13	.552
William & Mary	9	–	7	.563	12	–	14	.462
Furman	7	–	7	.500	12	–	16	.429
Davidson	5	–	7	.417	10	–	15	.400
Washington and Lee	5	–	8	.385	12	–	16	.429
VMI	3	–	11	.214	4	–	19	.174
The Citadel	0	–	10	.000	2	–	19	.095
† Southern Conference Tournament winner Rankings from AP Poll

The 1956 Southern Conference men's basketball tournament took place from March 1–3, 1956 at the Richmond Arena in Richmond, Virginia. The West Virginia Mountaineers, led by head coach Fred Schaus, won their second Southern Conference title and received the automatic berth to the 1956 NCAA tournament.

== Format ==
The top eight finishers of the conference's ten members were eligible for the tournament. Teams were seeded based on conference winning percentage. The tournament used a preset bracket consisting of three rounds.

== Bracket ==
Quarterfinals; March 1
1	George Washington	60
8	Washington and Lee	63
4	Richmond	79
5	William & Mary	62
2	West Virginia	59
7	Davidson	53
3	Virginia Tech	70
6	Furman	84

Semifinals; March 2
4	Richmond	65
8	Washington and Lee	56
2	West Virginia	77
6	Furman	74

Finals; March 3
2	West Virginia	58
4	Richmond	56

* Overtime game

== See also ==
- List of Southern Conference men's basketball champions
