= 1957 Southern Conference men's basketball tournament =

- Classification: Division I
- Season: 1956–57
- Teams: 8
- Site: Richmond Arena; Richmond, Virginia
- Champions: West Virginia (3rd title)
- Winning coach: Fred Schaus (3rd title)

1956–57 Southern Conference men's basketball standings
	Conf.				Overall
Team	W		L	PCT	W		L	PCT
No. 7 West Virginia †	12	–	0	1.000	25	–	5	.833
Washington and Lee	10	–	3	.769	20	–	7	.741
Virginia Tech	12	–	5	.706	14	–	8	.636
Furman	7	–	5	.583	10	–	17	.370
Richmond	9	–	7	.563	15	–	11	.577
William & Mary	7	–	11	.389	9	–	18	.333
The Citadel	5	–	9	.357	11	–	14	.440
Davidson	4	–	8	.333	7	–	20	.259
George Washington	3	–	9	.250	3	–	21	.125
VMI	1	–	13	.071	4	–	22	.154
† Southern Conference Tournament winner Rankings from AP Poll

The 1957 Southern Conference men's basketball tournament took place from March 7–9, 1957 at the Richmond Arena in Richmond, Virginia, United States. The West Virginia Mountaineers, led by head coach Fred Schaus, won their third Southern Conference title and received the automatic berth to the 1957 NCAA tournament.

== Format ==
The top eight finishers of the conference's ten members were eligible for the tournament. Teams were seeded based on conference winning percentage. The tournament used a preset bracket consisting of three rounds.

== Bracket ==
Quarterfinals; March 7
1	#11 West Virginia	71
8	Davidson	51
4	Furman	71
5	Richmond	90
2	Washington and Lee	85
7	The Citadel	62
3	Virginia Tech	64
6	William & Mary	56

Semifinals; March 8
1	#11 West Virginia	83
5	Richmond	62
2	Washington and Lee	68
3	Virginia Tech	54

Finals; March 9
1	#11 West Virginia	67
2	Washington and Lee	52

* Overtime game

== See also ==
- List of Southern Conference men's basketball champions
