= 1954–55 North Carolina Tar Heels men's basketball team =

American college basketball season

1954–55 North Carolina Tar Heels men's basketball
- Conference: Atlantic Coast Conference
- Record: 10–11 (8–6 ACC)
- Head coach: Frank McGuire
- Assistant coach: Buck Freeman
- Home arena: Woollen Gymnasium

In the 1954–1955 season, the North Carolina Tar Heels men's basketball team competed in a total of twenty-one games and finished with a record of 10–11. The team finished the season in sixth place in the Atlantic Coast Conference.

== Schedule and results ==
1954–55 ACC men's basketball standings
	Conf.				Overall
Team	W		L	PCT	W		L	PCT
No. 4 NC State †	12	–	2	.857	28	–	4	.875
Duke	11	–	3	.786	20	–	8	.714
Maryland	10	–	4	.714	17	–	7	.708
Wake Forest	8	–	6	.571	17	–	10	.630
North Carolina	8	–	6	.571	10	–	11	.476
Virginia	5	–	9	.357	14	–	15	.483
South Carolina	2	–	12	.143	10	–	17	.370
Clemson	0	–	14	.000	2	–	21	.087
† 1955 ACC tournament winner Rankings from AP Poll

December 4 Clemson H W 99–66
December 9 South Carolina H W 88–69
December 11 William & Mary A L 76–79
December 18 Maryland H L 60–70
Dixie Classic
December 27 USC (-/13) RAL W 67–58
December 28 NC State (-/2) RAL L 44–47
December 29 Duke (-/18) RAL W 65–52
January 3 LSU A L 77–84
January 4 Alabama (-/13) A L 55–77
January 8 Wake Forest H W 95–78
January 11 Virginia H W 96–87
January 14 South Carolina A W 73–64
January 15 Clemson A W 95–87
January 18 NC State (-/2) A W 84–80
February 4 Duke H L 68–91
February 11 Virginia GR L 73–98
February 12 Maryland (-/11) A L 61–63
February 16 Wake Forest A W 83–79
February 22 NC State (-/6) H L 75–79
February 25 Duke A L 74–96
ACC Tournament
March 3 Wake Forest RAL L 82–95

== Roster ==
Name	#	Height	Year	Home Town
Buddy Clark	23	6–3	Sophomore	Louisville, KY
Frank Goodwin	34	6–1	Sophomore	Belleville, NJ
Hilliard Greene	42	6–5	Junior	Zebulon, NC
Willis Henderson	15	6–3	Sophomore	Charlotte, NC
Al Lifson	21	6–2	Junior	Elizabeth, NJ
Paul Likins	41	6–9	Junior	Elkhart, IN
Gerry McCabe	31	6–3	Sophomore	New York, NY
Tony Radovich	44	6–2	Senior	Hoboken, NJ
Lennie Rosenbluth	10	6–5	Sophomore	New York, NY
Ed Sutton	22	6–1	Sophomore	Cullowhee, NC
Jerry Vayda	43	6–4	Sophomore	Bayonne, NJ
Dick Ward	11	6–1	Sophomore	Wilson, NC
Bob Young	20	6–6	Sophomore	New York, NY
