= 1959 ACC men's basketball tournament =

- Classification: Division I
- Season: 1958–59
- Teams: 8
- Site: Reynolds Coliseum; Raleigh, North Carolina
- Champions: NC State (4th title)
- Winning coach: Everett Case (4th title)
- MVP: Lou Pucillo (NC State)

1958–59 ACC men's basketball standings
	Conf.				Overall
Team	W		L	PCT	W		L	PCT
No. 6 NC State †	12	–	2	.857	22	–	4	.846
No. 9 North Carolina	12	–	2	.857	20	–	5	.800
Duke	7	–	7	.500	13	–	12	.520
Maryland	7	–	7	.500	10	–	13	.435
Virginia	6	–	8	.429	11	–	14	.440
Wake Forest	5	–	9	.357	10	–	14	.417
Clemson	5	–	9	.357	8	–	16	.333
South Carolina	2	–	12	.143	4	–	20	.167
† 1959 ACC tournament winner Rankings from AP Poll

The 1959 Atlantic Coast Conference men's basketball tournament was held in Raleigh, North Carolina, at Reynolds Coliseum from March 5–7, 1959. NC State defeated North Carolina, 80–56, to win the championship. Lou Pucillo of NC State was named tournament MVP.

== Bracket ==
Quarterfinals; March 5
1	#10 NC State	75^{OT}
8	South Carolina	72
4	Maryland	65
5	Virginia	66
2	#5 North Carolina	93
7	Clemson	69
3	Duke	78
6	Wake Forest	71

Semifinals; March 6
1	#10 NC State	66
5	Virginia	63
2	#5 North Carolina	74
3	Duke	71

Championship Game; March 7
1	#10 NC State	80
2	#5 North Carolina	56
