= 1954–55 Duke Blue Devils men's basketball team =

American college basketball season

1954–55 Duke Blue Devils men's basketball

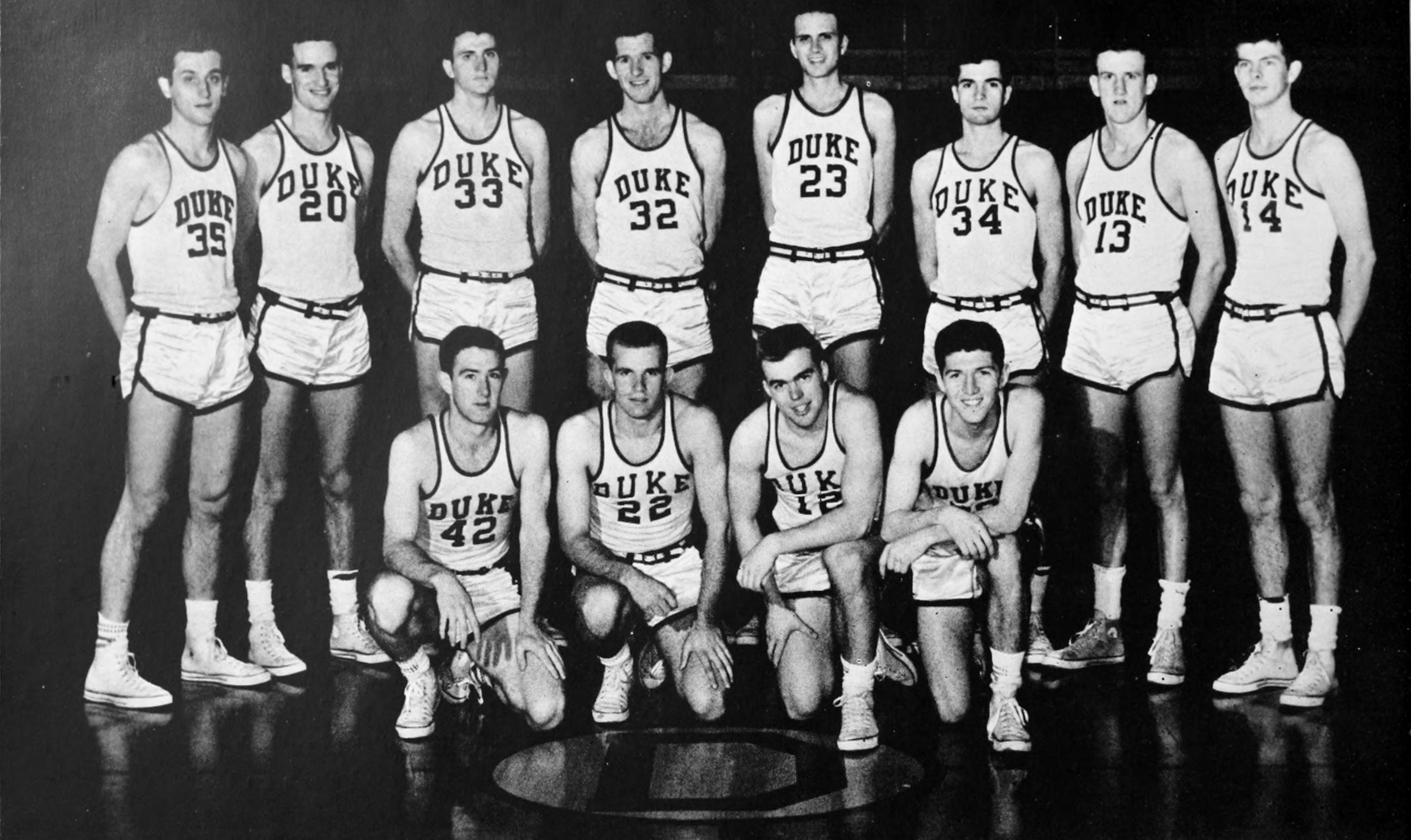

NCAA tournament, first round
- Conference: Atlantic Coast Conference
- Record: 20–8 (11–3 ACC)
- Head coach: Harold Bradley
- Home arena: Cameron Indoor Stadium

1954–55 ACC men's basketball standings
	Conf.				Overall
Team	W		L	PCT	W		L	PCT
No. 4 NC State †	12	–	2	.857	28	–	4	.875
Duke	11	–	3	.786	20	–	8	.714
Maryland	10	–	4	.714	17	–	7	.708
Wake Forest	8	–	6	.571	17	–	10	.630
North Carolina	8	–	6	.571	10	–	11	.476
Virginia	5	–	9	.357	14	–	15	.483
South Carolina	2	–	12	.143	10	–	17	.370
Clemson	0	–	14	.000	2	–	21	.087
† 1955 ACC tournament winner Rankings from AP Poll

The 1954–55 Duke Blue Devils men's basketball team represented Duke University in the 1954–55 NCAA Division I men's basketball season. The head coach was Harold Bradley and the team finished the season with an overall record of 20–8.
