= 1950–51 William & Mary Indians men's basketball team =

American college basketball season

1950–51 William & Mary Indians men's basketball
- Conference: Southern Conference
- Record: 20–11 (13–6 SoCon)
- Head coach: Barney Wilson (4th season)
- Home arena: Blow Gymnasium

1950–51 Southern Conference men's basketball standings
	Conf.				Overall
Team	W		L	PCT	W		L	PCT
No. 8 North Carolina State †	13	–	1	.929	30	–	7	.811
West Virginia	9	–	3	.750	18	–	9	.667
Clemson	9	–	4	.692	11	–	7	.611
William & Mary	13	–	6	.684	20	–	11	.645
Duke	13	–	6	.684	20	–	13	.606
Virginia Tech	9	–	5	.643	19	–	10	.655
South Carolina	12	–	7	.632	13	–	12	.520
Maryland	11	–	8	.579	15	–	10	.600
North Carolina	9	–	8	.529	12	–	15	.444
Wake Forest	8	–	9	.471	16	–	14	.533
George Washington	8	–	9	.471	12	–	12	.500
Richmond	5	–	10	.333	7	–	14	.333
Washington and Lee	5	–	13	.278	8	–	17	.320
VMI	3	–	11	.214	3	–	18	.143
Davidson	5	–	15	.250	7	–	19	.269
The Citadel	2	–	7	.222	6	–	11	.353
Furman	1	–	13	.071	3	–	20	.130
† Southern Conference Tournament winner Rankings from AP Poll

The 1950–51 William & Mary Indians men's basketball team represented the College of William & Mary in intercollegiate basketball during the 1950–51 NCAA men's basketball season. Under the fourth, and final, year of head coach Barney Wilson, the team finished the season 20–11 and 13–6 in the Southern Conference. This was the 46th season of the collegiate basketball program at William & Mary, whose nickname is now the Tribe. William & Mary played its home games at Blow Gymnasium.

The Indians finished in a tie for 4th place in the conference and qualified as the #4 seed for the 1951 Southern Conference men's basketball tournament, hosted by North Carolina State University at Reynolds Coliseum in Raleigh, North Carolina, where the Indians defeated West Virginia in the quarterfinals before losing against Duke in the semifinals.

After appearances in the Cincinnati Invitational Tournament the previous two seasons, William & Mary did not qualify for a post-season tournament this year. The Indians' next post-season appearance would not come until 1983.

== Program notes ==
- This was the third of three consecutive 20-win seasons for William & Mary, all under head coach Barney Wilson. This was the only such streak in program history. The Indians' next 20-win season would not come until 1982–83.
- The Indians played four teams for the first time this season: St. John's (NY), Marshall, Louisville, and West Virginia.

== Schedule ==
1950–51 Southern Conference men's basketball standings
	Conf.				Overall
Team	W		L	PCT	W		L	PCT
No. 8 North Carolina State †	13	–	1	.929	30	–	7	.811
West Virginia	9	–	3	.750	18	–	9	.667
Clemson	9	–	4	.692	11	–	7	.611
William & Mary	13	–	6	.684	20	–	11	.645
Duke	13	–	6	.684	20	–	13	.606
Virginia Tech	9	–	5	.643	19	–	10	.655
South Carolina	12	–	7	.632	13	–	12	.520
Maryland	11	–	8	.579	15	–	10	.600
North Carolina	9	–	8	.529	12	–	15	.444
Wake Forest	8	–	9	.471	16	–	14	.533
George Washington	8	–	9	.471	12	–	12	.500
Richmond	5	–	10	.333	7	–	14	.333
Washington and Lee	5	–	13	.278	8	–	17	.320
VMI	3	–	11	.214	3	–	18	.143
Davidson	5	–	15	.250	7	–	19	.269
The Citadel	2	–	7	.222	6	–	11	.353
Furman	1	–	13	.071	3	–	20	.130
† Southern Conference Tournament winner Rankings from AP Poll

Date time, TV	Rank^{#}	Opponent^{#}	Result	Record	Site city, state
Regular season
12/2/1950*		vs. St. John's (NY)	L 47–63	0–1	Madison Square Garden; New York City, NY
12/6/1950*		at Randolph–Macon	W 78–38	1–1	Ashland, VA
12/9/1950		Wake Forest	W 71–49	2–1 (1–0)	Blow Gymnasium; Williamsburg, VA
12/11/1950		at Maryland	L 41–48	2–2 (1–1)	Ritchie Coliseum; College Park, MD
12/14/1950*		Hampden–Sydney	W 70–46	3–2	Blow Gymnasium; Williamsburg, VA
12/16/1950		Davidson	W 65–49	4–2 (2–1)	Blow Gymnasium; Williamsburg, VA
12/19/1950*		at Marshall	W 56–38	5–2	Veterans Memorial Fieldhouse; Huntington, WV
12/20/1950*		at Louisville	L 47–70	5–3	Jefferson County Armory; Louisville, KY
12/21/1950*		at No. 17 Cincinnati	L 60–89	5–4	Cincinnati Gardens; Cincinnati, OH
12/22/1950*		at Morris Harvey	W 55–54	6–4	Charleston, WV
1/6/1951		Washington and Lee	W 76–55	7–4 (3–1)	Blow Gymnasium; Williamsburg, VA
1/8/1951		Furman	W 65–37	8–4 (4–1)	Blow Gymnasium; Williamsburg, VA
1/12/1951		at No. 7 NC State	L 54–61	8–5 (4–2)	Reynolds Coliseum; Raleigh, NC
1/13/1951		at Wake Forest	L 50–72	8–6 (4–3)	Gore Gymnasium; Wake Forest, NC
1/15/1951		Duke	W 74–57	9–6 (5–3)	Blow Gymnasium; Williamsburg, VA
1/17/1951		Washington and Lee	W 73–65	10–6 (6–3)	Blow Gymnasium; Williamsburg, VA
1/20/1951		Richmond	W 64–46	11–6 (7–3)	Blow Gymnasium; Williamsburg, VA
2/2/1951		VPI	W 73–67	12–6 (8–3)	Blow Gymnasium; Williamsburg, VA
2/3/1951		No. 8 NC State	W 88–78	13–6 (9–3)	Blow Gymnasium; Williamsburg, VA
2/6/1951		at Duke	L 54–61	13–7 (9–4)	Duke Indoor Stadium; Durham, NC
2/9/1951		at George Washington	L 62–66	13–8 (9–5)	Washington, DC
2/10/1951		VMI	W 87–67	14–8 (10–5)	Blow Gymnasium; Williamsburg, VA
2/13/1951*		Virginia	W 78–48	15–8	Blow Gymnasium; Williamsburg, VA
2/17/1951		Maryland	W 55–50	16–8 (11–5)	Blow Gymnasium; Williamsburg, VA
2/19/1951		at VPI	L 77–82	16–9 (11–6)	War Memorial Gymnasium; Blacksburg, VA
2/20/1951		at VMI	W 76–43	17–9 (12–6)	Cormack Field House; Lexington, VA
2/24/1951		at Richmond	W 76–58	18–9 (13–6)	Grays Armory; Richmond, VA
3/6/1951*		at Georgetown	W 75–64	20–10	Uline Arena; Washington, DC
3/7/1951*		Villanova	L 59–87	20–11	Blow Gymnasium; Williamsburg, VA
1951 Southern Conference Tournament
3/1/1951		vs. (2) West Virginia; Quarterfinals	W 88–67	19–9	Reynolds Coliseum; Raleigh, NC
3/3/1951		vs. (5) Duke; Semifinals	L 69–71	19–10	Reynolds Coliseum; Raleigh, NC
*Non-conference game. ^{#}Rankings from AP Poll. (#) Tournament seedings in parentheses.
