= Boydson Baird =

American basketball coach (1918–2010)

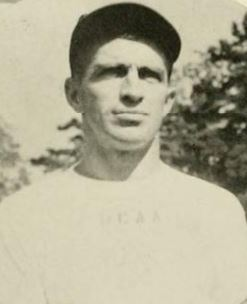
- Baird in the 1950–51 season

Biographical details
- Born: December 12, 1918; Kilbourne, Ohio, U.S.
- Died: January 24, 2010 (aged 91); Knoxville, Tennessee, U.S.

Playing career
- 1937–1941: Maryville (TN) (football, basketball, baseball, track)

Coaching career (HC unless noted)

Football
- 1953–1958: William & Mary (assistant)
- 1959–1963: Maryville (TN)
- 1973: Maryville (TN) (interim HC)

Basketball
- 1949–1952: Davidson
- 1952–1957: William & Mary
- 19??–19??: Maryville (TN)

Baseball
- 1967: Maryville (TN)
- 1970–1974: Maryville

Administrative career (AD unless noted)
- 1959–1975: Maryville (TN)

Head coaching record
- Overall: 27–23 (football); 75–126 (basketball); 81–66 (baseball)

Boydson Howard Baird (December 12, 1918 – January 24, 2010) was the head coach for the William & Mary Tribe men's basketball team from 1952 to 1957. In Southern Conference play, he guided his teams to a cumulative 35–41 record. Overall, Baird finished 51–73 in his five seasons as coach.

== Head coaching record ==
=== Basketball ===
Record table
Season	Team	Overall	Conference	Standing	Postseason
Davidson Wildcats (Southern Conference) (1949–1952)
1949–50	Davidson	10–16	6–12	10th	
1950–51	Davidson	7–19	5–15	14th	
1951–52	Davidson	7–18	4–15	15th	
Davidson:		24–53 (.312)	15–42 (.263)		
William & Mary Indians (Southern Conference) (1952–1957)
1952–53	William & Mary	10–13	6–13	12th	
1953–54	William & Mary	9–4	6–5	5th	
1954–55	William & Mary	11–14	7–5	6th	
1955–56	William & Mary	12–14	9–7	5th	
1956–57	William & Mary	9–18	7–11	6th	
William & Mary:		51–73 (.411)	35–41 (.461)		
Total:		75–126 (.373)			
