= Clemson Tigers men's basketball, 1950–1959 =

American collegiate basketball team seasons

The Clemson Tigers men's basketball teams of 1950–1959 represented Clemson Agricultural College in NCAA college basketball competition.

== 1949–50 ==
1949–50 Clemson Tigers men's basketball
- Conference: Southern Conference
- Record: 10–10 (8–8 SoCon)
- Head coach: Banks McFadden
- Home arena: Clemson Field House

1949–50 Southern Conference men's basketball standings
	Conf.				Overall
Team	W		L	PCT	W		L	PCT
No. 5 NC State †	12	–	2	.857	27	–	6	.818
William & Mary	12	–	4	.750	23	–	9	.719
George Washington	12	–	4	.750	17	–	8	.680
South Carolina	12	–	5	.706	13	–	9	.591
North Carolina	13	–	6	.684	17	–	12	.586
Virginia Tech	9	–	5	.643	16	–	9	.640
Wake Forest	11	–	8	.579	14	–	16	.467
Duke	9	–	7	.563	15	–	15	.500
Clemson	8	–	8	.500	10	–	10	.500
Davidson	6	–	12	.333	10	–	16	.385
Furman	4	–	8	.333	9	–	12	.429
Washington and Lee	4	–	9	.308	8	–	12	.400
Maryland	5	–	13	.278	7	–	18	.280
Richmond	4	–	13	.235	8	–	16	.333
The Citadel	2	–	10	.167	4	–	16	.200
VMI	2	–	11	.154	4	–	17	.190
† 1950 Southern Conference tournament winner As of April 30, 1950; Rankings from AP Poll

Date	Opponent	Site	Result
December 3*	at Georgia	Woodruff Hall • Athens, Georgia	L 40–59
December 6*	Georgia	Clemson Field House • Clemson, South Carolina	L 57–65
December 10*	Presbyterian	Clemson Field House • Clemson, South Carolina	W 55–53
December 16	at Maryland	Ritchie Coliseum • College Park, Maryland	W 60–55
December 17	at Richmond	Blues Armory • Richmond, Virginia	W 75–53
January 7	at Furman	Greenville, South Carolina	L 55–56 (OT)
January 10	Wake Forest	Clemson Field House • Clemson, South Carolina	L 58–66
January 14	Davidson	Clemson Field House • Clemson, South Carolina	W 88–82 (2OT)
January 18	The Citadel	Clemson Field House • Clemson, South Carolina	W 63–38
January 21	South Carolina	Clemson Field House • Clemson, South Carolina	L 56–66
February 3	at South Carolina	Carolina Fieldhouse • Columbia, South Carolina	L 40–43
February 4	at The Citadel	The Citadel Armory • Charleston, South Carolina	W 59–34
February 7	George Washington	Clemson Field House • Calhoun, South Carolina	L 61–66
February 10*	at Presbyterian	Clinton, South Carolina	W 74–51
February 14	at Davidson	Davidson, North Carolina	L 65–77
February 15	at Wake Forest	Gore Gymnasium • Wake Forest, North Carolina	L 52–65
February 18	Furman	Clemson Field House • Clemson, South Carolina	L 52–56
February 20	at Washington and Lee	Lexington, Virginia	W 78–63
February 21	at VMI	VMI Field House • Lexington, Virginia	W 83–73
February 25	Maryland	Clemson Field House • Clemson, South Carolina	W 70–68
*Non-Conference Game.

== 1950–51 ==
1950–51 Clemson Tigers men's basketball
- Conference: Southern Conference
- Record: 11–7 (9–4 SoCon)
- Head coach: Banks McFadden
- Home arena: Clemson Field House

1950–51 Southern Conference men's basketball standings
	Conf.				Overall
Team	W		L	PCT	W		L	PCT
No. 8 North Carolina State †	13	–	1	.929	30	–	7	.811
West Virginia	9	–	3	.750	18	–	9	.667
Clemson	9	–	4	.692	11	–	7	.611
William & Mary	13	–	6	.684	20	–	11	.645
Duke	13	–	6	.684	20	–	13	.606
Virginia Tech	9	–	5	.643	19	–	10	.655
South Carolina	12	–	7	.632	13	–	12	.520
Maryland	11	–	8	.579	15	–	10	.600
North Carolina	9	–	8	.529	12	–	15	.444
Wake Forest	8	–	9	.471	16	–	14	.533
George Washington	8	–	9	.471	12	–	12	.500
Richmond	5	–	10	.333	7	–	14	.333
Washington and Lee	5	–	13	.278	8	–	17	.320
VMI	3	–	11	.214	3	–	18	.143
Davidson	5	–	15	.250	7	–	19	.269
The Citadel	2	–	7	.222	6	–	11	.353
Furman	1	–	13	.071	3	–	20	.130
† Southern Conference Tournament winner Rankings from AP Poll

Date	Opponent	Site	Result
December 9*	at Presbyterian	Clinton, South Carolina	L 76–78
December 14*	at Georgia	Woodruff Hall • Athens, Georgia	L 45–58
December 18*	Georgia	Clemson Field House • Clemson, South Carolina	W 70–69
January 6*	Presbyterian	Clemson Field House • Clemson, South Carolina	W 87–78
January 9	South Carolina	Clemson Field House • Clemson, South Carolina	L 61–76
January 16	Furman	Clemson Field House • Clemson, South Carolina	W 85–59
January 20	The Citadel	Clemson Field House • Clemson, South Carolina	W 69–43
January 27	Davidson	Clemson Field House • Clemson, South Carolina	W 74–62
February 1	at Furman	Greenville, South Carolina	W 89–72
February 3	Maryland	Clemson Field House • Clemson, South Carolina	W 50–44
February 9	at Davidson	Davidson, North Carolina	L 55–56
February 10	at Wake Forest	Gore Gymnasium • Wake Forest, North Carolina	L 72–73 (OT)
February 15	Wake Forest	Clemson Field House • Clemson, South Carolina	W 57–47
February 20	at Maryland	Ritchie Coliseum • College Park, Maryland	L 50–54 (OT)
February 21	at George Washington	Washington, D.C.	W 82–76
February 23	at South Carolina	Carolina Fieldhouse • Columbia, South Carolina	W 78–72
February 24	at The Citadel	The Citadel Armory • Charleston, South Carolina	W 73–57
March 6*	vs. Maryland	Reynolds Coliseum • Raleigh, North Carolina (Southern Conference tournament)	L 48–50
*Non-Conference Game.

== 1951–52 ==
1951–52 Clemson Tigers men's basketball
- Conference: Southern Conference
- Record: 17–7 (11–4 SoCon)
- Head coach: Banks McFadden
- Home arena: Clemson Field House

1951–52 Southern Conference men's basketball standings
	Conf.				Overall
Team	W		L	PCT	W		L	PCT
No. 9 West Virginia	15	–	1	.938	23	–	4	.852
North Carolina State †	12	–	2	.857	24	–	10	.706
No. 12 Duke	13	–	3	.813	24	–	6	.800
Clemson	11	–	4	.733	17	–	7	.708
George Washington	12	–	6	.667	15	–	9	.625
Maryland	9	–	5	.643	13	–	9	.591
Furman	9	–	5	.643	18	–	6	.750
William & Mary	10	–	6	.625	15	–	13	.536
South Carolina	8	–	7	.533	14	–	10	.583
Wake Forest	7	–	9	.438	10	–	19	.345
North Carolina	8	–	11	.421	12	–	15	.444
Virginia Tech	3	–	10	.231	4	–	16	.200
Richmond	3	–	11	.214	7	–	15	.318
Washington and Lee	3	–	11	.214	6	–	21	.222
Davidson	4	–	15	.211	7	–	18	.280
VMI	2	–	13	.133	3	–	21	.125
The Citadel	1	–	11	.083	8	–	20	.286
† Southern Conference Tournament winner Rankings from AP Poll

Date	Opponent^{#}	Site	Result
December 1*	Georgia	Clemson Field House • Clemson, South Carolina	W 57–47
December 5*	at Georgia	Woodruff Hall • Athens, Georgia	W 77–54
December 11*	Presbyterian	Clemson Field House • Clemson, South Carolina	W 85–72
December 14*	at Presbyterian	Clinton, South Carolina	W 78–76 (OT)
December 17*	at Tennessee	Alumni Memorial Gym • Knoxville, Tennessee	L 52–61
December 27*	vs. Florida	Jacksonville, Florida (Gator Bowl Tournament Quarterfinal)	L 61–76
December 28*	vs. Florida State	Jacksonville, Florida (Gator Bowl Tournament Consolation)	W 62–56
December 29*	vs. Georgia	Jacksonville, Florida (Gator Bowl Tournament Consolation)	W 85–60
January 5	at North Carolina	Woollen Gymnasium • Chapel Hill, North Carolina	L 59–65
January 8	Furman	Clemson Field House • Clemson, South Carolina	W 70–65
January 12	The Citadel	Clemson Field House • Clemson, South Carolina	W 89–59
January 15	at South Carolina	Carolina Fieldhouse • Columbia, South Carolina	L 65–71
January 26	at The Citadel	The Citadel Armory • Charleston, South Carolina	W 66–63
January 30	at Furman	Greenville, South Carolina	W 67–66
February 2	Davidson	Clemson Field House • Clemson, South Carolina	W 67–49
February 4	George Washington	Clemson Field House • Clemson, South Carolina	W 80–65
February 8	at Davidson	Davidson, North Carolina	W 71–69
February 9	at Wake Forest	Gore Gymnasium • Wake Forest, North Carolina	W 68–63
February 16	North Carolina	Clemson Field House • Clemson, South Carolina	W 77–69
February 19	Wake Forest	Clemson Field House • Clemson, South Carolina	W 85–84 (OT)
February 22	at #12 West Virginia	WVU Field House • Morgantown, West Virginia	L 73–88
February 23	at #12 West Virginia	WVU Field House • Morgantown, West Virginia	L 69–80
March 6*	vs. George Washington	Reynolds Coliseum • Raleigh, North Carolina (Southern Conference tournament)	L 65–78
*Non-Conference Game. #Rankings from AP Poll released prior to game.

== 1952–53 ==
1952–53 Clemson Tigers men's basketball
- Conference: Southern Conference
- Record: 8–10 (6–8 SoCon)
- Head coach: Banks McFadden
- Home arena: Clemson Field House

1952–53 Southern Conference men's basketball standings
	Conf.				Overall
Team	W		L	PCT	W		L	PCT
No. 18 North Carolina State	13	–	3	.813	26	–	6	.813
No. 15 Wake Forest †	12	–	3	.800	19	–	6	.760
Maryland	12	–	3	.800	15	–	8	.652
West Virginia	11	–	3	.786	19	–	17	.528
Furman	10	–	3	.769	21	–	6	.778
Duke	12	–	4	.750	17	–	8	.680
Richmond	13	–	5	.722	21	–	7	.750
North Carolina	15	–	6	.714	17	–	10	.630
George Washington	12	–	6	.667	15	–	7	.682
Clemson	6	–	8	.429	8	–	10	.444
South Carolina	7	–	12	.368	11	–	13	.458
William & Mary	6	–	13	.316	10	–	13	.435
Virginia Tech	4	–	13	.235	4	–	19	.174
Davidson	3	–	14	.176	4	–	16	.200
VMI	1	–	14	.067	5	–	19	.208
Washington and Lee	1	–	17	.056	2	–	20	.091
The Citadel	0	–	11	.000	4	–	14	.222
† Southern Conference Tournament winner Rankings from AP Poll

Date	Opponent	Site	Result
December 2*	at Georgia	Woodruff Hall • Athens, Georgia	L 60–66
December 4*	Presbyterian	Clemson Field House • Clemson, South Carolina	W 77–64
December 6*	Georgia	Clemson Field House • Clemson, South Carolina	L 55–57
December 10	at North Carolina	Woollen Gymnasium • Chapel Hill, North Carolina	L 56–82
December 13	Richmond	Clemson Field House • Clemson, South Carolina	L 60–74
December 16*	at Presbyterian	Clinton, South Carolina	W 82–64
January 2	William & Mary	Clemson Field House • Clemson, South Carolina	W 81–71
January 9	Furman	Clemson Field House • Clemson, South Carolina	L 64–66
January 14	Wake Forest	Clemson Field House • Clemson, South Carolina	L 66–93
January 16	at South Carolina	Carolina Fieldhouse • Columbia, South Carolina	W 74–63
January 17	at The Citadel	The Citadel Armory • Charleston, South Carolina	W 64–58
January 19	The Citadel	Clemson Field House • Clemson, South Carolina	W 79–50
January 21	North Carolina	Clemson Field House • Clemson, South Carolina	L 80–91
February 2	South Carolina	Clemson Field House • Clemson, South Carolina	L 67–71
February 13	at Davidson	Davidson, North Carolina	W 64–59
February 14	at Wake Forest	Gore Gymnasium • Wake Forest, North Carolina	L 56–87
February 23	Davidson	Clemson Field House • Clemson, South Carolina	W 72–58
February 27	at Furman	Greenville, South Carolina	L 70–95
*Non-Conference Game.

== 1953–54 ==
1953–54 Clemson Tigers men's basketball
- Conference: Atlantic Coast Conference
- Record: 5–18 (0–9 ACC)
- Head coach: Banks McFadden
- Home arena: Clemson Field House

1953–54 ACC men's basketball standings
	Conf.				Overall
Team	W		L	PCT	W		L	PCT
No. 15 Duke	9	–	1	.900	21	–	6	.778
No. 20 Maryland	7	–	2	.778	23	–	7	.767
Wake Forest	8	–	4	.667	17	–	12	.586
NC State †	5	–	3	.625	26	–	7	.788
North Carolina	5	–	6	.455	11	–	10	.524
South Carolina	2	–	8	.200	10	–	16	.385
Virginia	1	–	4	.200	16	–	11	.593
Clemson	0	–	9	.000	5	–	18	.217
† 1954 ACC tournament winner Rankings from AP Poll

The Tigers began play in the Atlantic Coast Conference.

Date	Opponent^{#}	Site	Result
December 1*	at Presbyterian	Clinton, South Carolina	L 61–92
December 3	Maryland	Clemson Field House • Clemson, South Carolina	L 41–81
December 5*	Georgia	Clemson Field House • Clemson, South Carolina	L 63–71
December 8*	at Tennessee	Alumni Memorial Gym • Knoxville, Tennessee	L 56–82
December 9*	at Tennessee Tech	Cookeville, Tennessee	L 80–97
December 12*	at Georgia	Woodruff Hall • Athens, Georgia	L 51–77
December 15*	Presbyterian	Clemson Field House • Clemson, South Carolina	W 72–56
December 19	at North Carolina	Woollen Gymnasium • Chapel Hill, North Carolina	L 48–85
January 4*	at William & Mary	Blow Gymnasium • Williamsburg, Virginia	W 75–72
January 5*	at George Washington	Washington, D.C.	L 55–95
January 6	at Maryland	Ritchie Coliseum • College Park, Maryland	L 54–79
January 12*	at Furman	Greenville, South Carolina	L 69–87
January 15	at South Carolina	Carolina Fieldhouse • Columbia, South Carolina	L 57–65
January 16*	at The Citadel	The Citadel Armory • Charleston, South Carolina	W 76–52
January 29*	The Citadel	Clemson Field House • Clemson, South Carolina	W 78–55
February 1*	Furman	Clemson Field House • Clemson, South Carolina	L 55–70
February 6	Wake Forest	Clemson Field House • Clemson, South Carolina	L 69–101
February 9	at Wake Forest	Gore Gymnasium • Wake Forest, North Carolina	L 57–98
February 13	North Carolina	Clemson Field House • Clemson, South Carolina	L 56–72
February 16	South Carolina	Clemson Field House • Clemson, South Carolina	L 61–64
February 20	at NC State	Reynolds Coliseum • Raleigh, North Carolina	L 59–113
February 27*	Davidson	Clemson Field House • Clemson, South Carolina	W 81–69
March 5*	vs. #17 Maryland	Reynolds Coliseum • Raleigh, North Carolina (ACC Tournament Quarterfinal)	L 59–75
*Non-Conference Game. #Rankings from AP Poll released prior to game.

== 1954–55 ==
1954–55 Clemson Tigers men's basketball
- Conference: Atlantic Coast Conference
- Record: 2–21 (0–14 ACC)
- Head coach: Banks McFadden
- Home arena: Clemson Field House

1954–55 ACC men's basketball standings
	Conf.				Overall
Team	W		L	PCT	W		L	PCT
No. 4 NC State †	12	–	2	.857	28	–	4	.875
Duke	11	–	3	.786	20	–	8	.714
Maryland	10	–	4	.714	17	–	7	.708
Wake Forest	8	–	6	.571	17	–	10	.630
North Carolina	8	–	6	.571	10	–	11	.476
Virginia	5	–	9	.357	14	–	15	.483
South Carolina	2	–	12	.143	10	–	17	.370
Clemson	0	–	14	.000	2	–	21	.087
† 1955 ACC tournament winner Rankings from AP Poll

Date	Opponent	Site	Result
December 1*	Presbyterian	Clemson Field House • Clemson, South Carolina	L 75–81
December 2	at Duke	Duke Indoor Stadium • Durham, North Carolina	L 54–115
December 4	at North Carolina	Woollen Gymnasium • Chapel Hill, North Carolina	L 66–99
December 7*	at Georgia	Woodruff Hall • Athens, Georgia	W 74–72
December 14	#4 NC State	Clemson Field House • Clemson, South Carolina	L 72–112
December 17	Virginia	Clemson Field House • Clemson, South Carolina	L 94–100
January 3*	at Tennessee	Alumni Memorial Gym • Knoxville, Tennessee	L 55–94
January 4*	at Tennessee Tech	Cookeville, Tennessee	L 71–84
January 8	#11 Maryland	Clemson Field House • Clemson, South Carolina	L 63–71
January 11	Duke	Clemson Field House • Clemson, South Carolina	L 66–75
January 15	North Carolina	Clemson Field House • Clemson, South Carolina	L 87–95
January 18	South Carolina	Clemson Field House • Clemson, South Carolina	L 87–90
January 29*	Furman	Clemson Field House • Clemson, South Carolina	L 73–89
February 1*	at Presbyterian	Clinton, South Carolina	L 56–92
February 4	at Wake Forest	Gore Gymnasium • Wake Forest, North Carolina	L 65–120
February 5	at #6 NC State	Reynolds Coliseum • Raleigh, North Carolina	L 85–119
February 14	at Virginia	Memorial Gymnasium • Charlottesville, Virginia	L 68–106
February 15	at #11 Maryland	Ritchie Coliseum • College Park, Maryland	L 66–68
February 18	at South Carolina	Carolina Fieldhouse • Columbia, South Carolina	L 68–85
February 21*	at Georgia	Clemson Field House • Clemson, South Carolina	W 105–94
February 24*	at Furman	Greenville, South Carolina	L 87–124
February 26	Wake Forest	Clemson Field House • Clemson, South Carolina	L 79–100
March 3*	vs. #5 NC State	Reynolds Coliseum • Raleigh, North Carolina (ACC Tournament Quarterfinal)	L 76–101
*Non-Conference Game. #Rankings from AP Poll released prior to game.

== 1955–56 ==
1955–56 Clemson Tigers men's basketball

Gator Bowl Tournament Champions
- Conference: Atlantic Coast Conference
- Record: 9–17 (1–13 ACC)
- Head coach: Banks McFadden
- Home arena: Clemson Field House

1955–56 ACC men's basketball standings
	Conf.				Overall
Team	W		L	PCT	W		L	PCT
No. 2 NC State †	11	–	3	.786	24	–	4	.857
No. 13 North Carolina	11	–	3	.786	18	–	5	.783
No. 16 Wake Forest	10	–	4	.714	19	–	9	.679
No. 17 Duke	10	–	4	.714	19	–	7	.731
Maryland	7	–	7	.500	14	–	10	.583
South Carolina	3	–	11	.214	9	–	14	.391
Virginia	3	–	11	.214	10	–	17	.370
Clemson	1	–	13	.071	9	–	17	.346
† 1956 ACC tournament winner Rankings from AP Poll

Date	Opponent	Site	Result
December 2	at Duke	Duke Indoor Stadium • Durham, North Carolina	L 63–97
December 3	at North Carolina	Woollen Gymnasium • Chapel Hill, North Carolina	L 58–73
December 13	#2 NC State	Clemson Field House • Clemson, South Carolina	L 83–100
December 16	Virginia	Clemson Field House • Clemson, South Carolina	W 75–73
December 19*	vs. Florida State	Charlotte, North Carolina (Carousel Classic Quarterfinal)	W 94–76
December 20*	vs. Tennessee	Charlotte, North Carolina (Carousel Classic Semifinal)	W 89–86
December 21*	vs. Wake Forest	Charlotte, North Carolina (Carousel Classic Final)	L 79–98
December 28*	vs. LSU	Jacksonville, Florida (Gator Bowl Tournament Semifinal)	W 100–95
December 29*	vs. South Carolina	Jacksonville, Florida (Gator Bowl Tournament Final)	W 94–87
January 4*	vs. Spring Hill	Mobile, Alabama (Senior Bowl Tournament Semifinal)	L 91–102
January 5*	vs. Miami (FL)	Mobile, Alabama (Senior Bowl Tournament Consolation)	W 98–96
January 7	Maryland	Clemson Field House • Clemson, South Carolina	L 63–71
January 11	#6 Duke	Clemson Field House • Clemson, South Carolina	L 80–109
January 14	#9 North Carolina	Clemson Field House • Clemson, South Carolina	L 99–103 (OT)
January 18	at South Carolina	Carolina Fieldhouse • Columbia, South Carolina	L 79–94
January 21*	at Furman	Greenville, South Carolina	W 112–99
January 28	Wake Forest	Clemson Field House • Clemson, South Carolina	L 103–104
January 30*	at The Citadel	The Citadel Armory • Charleston, South Carolina	W 86–70
February 3	at Wake Forest	Gore Gymnasium • Wake Forest, North Carolina	L 87–108
February 4	at #4 NC State	Reynolds Coliseum • Raleigh, North Carolina	L 88–105
February 6*	The Citadel	Clemson Field House • Clemson, South Carolina	W 114–69
February 13	at Virginia	Memorial Gymnasium • Charlottesville, Virginia	L 85–96
February 14	at Maryland	Student Activities Building • College Park, Maryland	L 69–81
February 21	South Carolina	Clemson Field House • Clemson, South Carolina	L 83–89
February 23*	Furman	Clemson Field House • Clemson, South Carolina	L 80–91
March 1*	vs. #5 NC State	Reynolds Coliseum • Raleigh, North Carolina (ACC Tournament Quarterfinal)	L 84–88
*Non-Conference Game. #Rankings from AP Poll released prior to game.

== 1956–57 ==
1956–57 Clemson Tigers men's basketball
- Conference: Atlantic Coast Conference
- Record: 7–17 (3–11 ACC)
- Head coach: Press Maravich
- Home arena: Clemson Field House

1956–57 ACC men's basketball standings
	Conf.				Overall
Team	W		L	PCT	W		L	PCT
No. 1 North Carolina†	14	–	0	1.000	32	–	0	1.000
Maryland	9	–	5	.643	16	–	10	.615
Duke	8	–	6	.571	13	–	11	.542
No. 18 Wake Forest	7	–	7	.500	19	–	9	.679
NC State	7	–	7	.500	15	–	11	.577
South Carolina	5	–	9	.357	17	–	12	.586
Virginia	3	–	11	.214	6	–	19	.240
Clemson	3	–	11	.214	7	–	17	.292
† 1957 ACC tournament winner Rankings from AP Poll

Date	Opponent	Site	Result
December 4	Duke	Clemson Field House • Clemson, South Carolina	L 78–84
December 8	vs. North Carolina	Charlotte, North Carolina	L 75–94
December 11	#8 NC State	Clemson Field House • Clemson, South Carolina	W 96–94 (OT)
December 15*	at The Citadel	The Citadel Armory • Charleston, South Carolina	L 66–71
December 17*	vs. Alabama Polytechnic	Charlotte, North Carolina (Carousel Classic Quarterfinal)	L 64–89
December 18*	vs. Davidson	Charlotte, North Carolina (Carousel Classic Consolation)	W 75–67
December 19*	vs. Muhlenberg	Charlotte, North Carolina (Carousel Classic Consolation)	L 65–88
December 27*	vs. Georgia	Jacksonville, Florida (Gator Bowl Tournament Semifinal)	L 76–84
December 28*	vs. Florida	Jacksonville, Florida (Gator Bowl Tournament Consolation)	L 71–105
January 4	Maryland	Clemson Field House • Clemson, South Carolina	L 52–59
January 11	at #2 North Carolina	Woollen Gymnasium • Chapel Hill, North Carolina	L 54–86
January 12	at #15 Duke	Duke Indoor Stadium • Durham, North Carolina	L 70–80
January 16*	Furman	Clemson Field House • Clemson, South Carolina	W 80–77 (OT)
February 1	at #13 Wake Forest	Winston–Salem Memorial Coliseum • Winston-Salem, North Carolina	L 70–81
February 2	at NC State	Reynolds Coliseum • Raleigh, North Carolina	L 71–75
February 8	#10 Wake Forest	Clemson Field House • Clemson, South Carolina	L 72–93
February 12	South Carolina	Clemson Field House • Clemson, South Carolina	W 79–71
February 6*	The Citadel	Clemson Field House • Clemson, South Carolina	W 68–66
February 16	Virginia	Clemson Field House • Clemson, South Carolina	W 84–81
February 21*	at Furman	Greenville, South Carolina	W 91–79
February 23	at Virginia	Memorial Gymnasium • Charlottesville, Virginia	L 71–85
February 25	at Maryland	Cole Field House • College Park, Maryland	L 65–74
March 2	vs. South Carolina	Charlotte, North Carolina	L 85–113
March 7*	vs. #1 North Carolina	Reynolds Coliseum • Raleigh, North Carolina (ACC Tournament Quarterfinal)	L 61–81
*Non-Conference Game. #Rankings from AP Poll released prior to game.

== 1957–58 ==
1957–58 Clemson Tigers men's basketball
- Conference: Atlantic Coast Conference
- Record: 8–16 (4–10 ACC)
- Head coach: Press Maravich
- Home arena: Clemson Field House

1957–58 ACC men's basketball standings
	Conf.				Overall
Team	W		L	PCT	W		L	PCT
No. 10 Duke	11	–	3	.786	18	–	7	.720
No. 20 NC State	10	–	4	.714	18	–	6	.750
No. 13 North Carolina	10	–	4	.714	19	–	7	.731
No. 6 Maryland †	9	–	5	.643	22	–	7	.759
Virginia	6	–	8	.429	10	–	13	.435
Clemson	4	–	10	.286	8	–	16	.333
South Carolina	3	–	11	.214	5	–	19	.208
Wake Forest	3	–	11	.214	6	–	17	.261
† 1958 ACC tournament winner Rankings from AP Poll

Date	Opponent	Site	Result
December 4*	Georgia	Clemson Field House • Clemson, South Carolina	L 60–72
December 6	at Duke	Duke Indoor Stadium • Durham, North Carolina	L 66–79
December 7	at North Carolina	Woollen Gymnasium • Chapel Hill, North Carolina	L 55–79
December 10	#12 NC State	Clemson Field House • Clemson, South Carolina	W 63–59
December 19*	vs. Alabama	Charlotte, North Carolina (Carousel Classic Quarterfinal)	L 75–78
December 20*	vs. Lafayette	Charlotte, North Carolina (Carousel Classic Consolation)	W 78–65
December 21*	vs. Bucknell	Charlotte, North Carolina (Carousel Classic Consolation)	W 71–66
December 30*	vs. Florida	Jacksonville, Florida (Gator Bowl Tournament Semifinal)	L 64–76
December 31*	vs. South Carolina	Jacksonville, Florida (Gator Bowl Tournament Consolation)	W 85–65
January 3	Virginia	Clemson Field House • Clemson, South Carolina	L 85–88 (2OT)
January 4	#7 Maryland	Clemson Field House • Clemson, South Carolina	W 73–66
January 11	at South Carolina	Carolina Fieldhouse • Columbia, South Carolina	L 67–74
January 14	at Wake Forest	Winston–Salem Memorial Coliseum • Winston-Salem, North Carolina	W 81–72
January 18	#6 North Carolina	Clemson Field House • Clemson, South Carolina	L 81–90
January 25*	The Citadel	Clemson Field House • Clemson, South Carolina	L 57–60
February 1	at #10 NC State	Reynolds Coliseum • Raleigh, North Carolina	L 54–56
February 4	vs. #13 Duke	Charlotte, North Carolina	L 57–73
February 13	at #9 Maryland	Cole Field House • College Park, Maryland	L 54–72
February 14	at Virginia	Memorial Gymnasium • Charlottesville, Virginia	L 59–74
February 20	South Carolina	Clemson Field House • Clemson, South Carolina	L 60–61
February 22*	at Furman	Greenville, South Carolina	L 95–102 (OT)
February 24	Wake Forest	Clemson Field House • Clemson, South Carolina	W 86–76
March 1*	Furman	Clemson Field House • Clemson, South Carolina	W 73–58
March 6*	vs. #13 North Carolina	Reynolds Coliseum • Raleigh, North Carolina (ACC Tournament Quarterfinal)	L 51–62
*Non-Conference Game. #Rankings from AP Poll released prior to game.

== 1958–59 ==
1958–59 Clemson Tigers men's basketball
- Conference: Atlantic Coast Conference
- Record: 8–16 (5–9 ACC)
- Head coach: Press Maravich
- Home arena: Clemson Field House

1958–59 ACC men's basketball standings
	Conf.				Overall
Team	W		L	PCT	W		L	PCT
No. 6 NC State †	12	–	2	.857	22	–	4	.846
No. 9 North Carolina	12	–	2	.857	20	–	5	.800
Duke	7	–	7	.500	13	–	12	.520
Maryland	7	–	7	.500	10	–	13	.435
Virginia	6	–	8	.429	11	–	14	.440
Wake Forest	5	–	9	.357	10	–	14	.417
Clemson	5	–	9	.357	8	–	16	.333
South Carolina	2	–	12	.143	4	–	20	.167
† 1959 ACC tournament winner Rankings from AP Poll

Date	Opponent	Site	Result
December 1*	at Georgia	Woodruff Hall • Athens, Georgia	L 59–76
December 3	at North Carolina	Woollen Gymnasium • Chapel Hill, North Carolina	L 67–83
December 5	Duke	Clemson Field House • Clemson, South Carolina	W 56–55
December 9	#5 NC State	Clemson Field House • Clemson, South Carolina	L 54–56
December 12*	vs. Duquesne	Pittsburgh, Pennsylvania (Steel Bowl Semifinal)	L 54–71
December 13*	vs. Miami (FL)	Pittsburgh, Pennsylvania (Steel Bowl Consolation)	W 66–61
December 29*	vs. George Washington	Charlotte, North Carolina (Carousel Classic Quarterfinal)	L 53–72
December 30*	vs. Pittsburgh	Charlotte, North Carolina (Carousel Classic Consolation)	L 50–60
December 31*	vs. South Carolina	Charlotte, North Carolina (Carousel Classic Consolation)	W 55–49
January 3	at Wake Forest	Winston–Salem Memorial Coliseum • Winston-Salem, North Carolina	L 47–57
January 5	South Carolina	Clemson Field House • Clemson, South Carolina	L 69–83
January 9	Virginia	Clemson Field House • Clemson, South Carolina	W 70–63
January 10	Maryland	Clemson Field House • Clemson, South Carolina	W 55–46
January 13	at Duke	Duke Indoor Stadium • Durham, North Carolina	L 41–45
January 16*	Furman	Clemson Field House • Clemson, South Carolina	L 48–69
January 19*	at The Citadel	The Citadel Armory • Charleston, South Carolina	L 44–55
January 30	vs. #2 North Carolina	Charlotte Coliseum • Charlotte, North Carolina (North–South Doubleheader)	L 46–60
January 31	vs. #6 NC State	Charlotte Coliseum • Charlotte, North Carolina (North–South Doubleheader)	L 54–69
February 12*	at Furman	Alley Gymnasium • Greenville, South Carolina	W 73–64
February 14	at Virginia	Memorial Gymnasium • Charlottesville, Virginia	L 61–69
February 16	at Maryland	Cole Field House • College Park, Maryland	L 58–77
February 21	at South Carolina	Carolina Fieldhouse • Columbia, South Carolina	W 58–56 (OT)
February 23	Wake Forest	Clemson Field House • Clemson, South Carolina	W 58–51
March 5*	vs. #5 North Carolina	Reynolds Coliseum • Raleigh, North Carolina (ACC Tournament Quarterfinal)	L 69–93
*Non-Conference Game. #Rankings from AP Poll released prior to game.
