= 1953 Southern Conference men's basketball tournament =

- Classification: Division I
- Season: 1952–53
- Teams: 8
- Site: Reynolds Coliseum; Raleigh, NC
- Champions: Wake Forest (1st title)
- Winning coach: Murray Greason (1st title)

1952–53 Southern Conference men's basketball standings
	Conf.				Overall
Team	W		L	PCT	W		L	PCT
No. 18 North Carolina State	13	–	3	.813	26	–	6	.813
No. 15 Wake Forest †	12	–	3	.800	19	–	6	.760
Maryland	12	–	3	.800	15	–	8	.652
West Virginia	11	–	3	.786	19	–	17	.528
Furman	10	–	3	.769	21	–	6	.778
Duke	12	–	4	.750	17	–	8	.680
Richmond	13	–	5	.722	21	–	7	.750
North Carolina	15	–	6	.714	17	–	10	.630
George Washington	12	–	6	.667	15	–	7	.682
Clemson	6	–	8	.429	8	–	10	.444
South Carolina	7	–	12	.368	11	–	13	.458
William & Mary	6	–	13	.316	10	–	13	.435
Virginia Tech	4	–	13	.235	4	–	19	.174
Davidson	3	–	14	.176	4	–	16	.200
VMI	1	–	14	.067	5	–	19	.208
Washington and Lee	1	–	17	.056	2	–	20	.091
The Citadel	0	–	11	.000	4	–	14	.222
† Southern Conference Tournament winner Rankings from AP Poll

The 1953 Southern Conference men's basketball tournament took place from March 5–7, 1953 at the Reynolds Coliseum in Raleigh, North Carolina. The Wake Forest Demon Deacons, led by head coach Murray Greason, won their first Southern Conference title and received the automatic berth to the 1953 NCAA tournament.

== Format ==
The top eight finishers of the conference's seventeen members were eligible for the tournament. Teams were seeded based on conference winning percentage. The tournament used a preset bracket consisting of three rounds.

== Bracket ==
Quarterfinals; March 5
1	#12 NC State	86
8	North Carolina	54
4	West Virginia	91
5	Furman	87
2	Wake Forest	88
7	Richmond	70
3	Maryland	74
6	Duke	65

Semifinals; March 6
1	#12 NC State	85
4	West Virginia	80
2	Wake Forest	61
3	Maryland	59

Finals; March 7
1	#12 NC State	70
2	Wake Forest	71

* Overtime game

== See also ==
- List of Southern Conference men's basketball champions
