= 1951 Southern Conference men's basketball tournament =

- Classification: Division I
- Season: 1950–51
- Teams: 8
- Site: Reynolds Coliseum; Raleigh, NC
- Champions: North Carolina State (6th title)
- Winning coach: Everett Case (5th title)

1950–51 Southern Conference men's basketball standings
	Conf.				Overall
Team	W		L	PCT	W		L	PCT
No. 8 North Carolina State †	13	–	1	.929	30	–	7	.811
West Virginia	9	–	3	.750	18	–	9	.667
Clemson	9	–	4	.692	11	–	7	.611
William & Mary	13	–	6	.684	20	–	11	.645
Duke	13	–	6	.684	20	–	13	.606
Virginia Tech	9	–	5	.643	19	–	10	.655
South Carolina	12	–	7	.632	13	–	12	.520
Maryland	11	–	8	.579	15	–	10	.600
North Carolina	9	–	8	.529	12	–	15	.444
Wake Forest	8	–	9	.471	16	–	14	.533
George Washington	8	–	9	.471	12	–	12	.500
Richmond	5	–	10	.333	7	–	14	.333
Washington and Lee	5	–	13	.278	8	–	17	.320
VMI	3	–	11	.214	3	–	18	.143
Davidson	5	–	15	.250	7	–	19	.269
The Citadel	2	–	7	.222	6	–	11	.353
Furman	1	–	13	.071	3	–	20	.130
† Southern Conference Tournament winner Rankings from AP Poll

The 1951 Southern Conference men's basketball tournament took place from March 6–8, 1951 at the Reynolds Coliseum in Raleigh, North Carolina. The North Carolina State Wolfpack, led by head coach Everett Case, won their sixth Southern Conference title and received the automatic berth to the 1951 NCAA tournament.

== Format ==
The top eight finishers of the conference's seventeen members were eligible for the tournament. Teams were seeded based on conference winning percentage. The tournament used a preset bracket consisting of three rounds.

== Bracket ==
Quarterfinals; March 6
1	#8 NC State	83
7	South Carolina	53
3	Clemson	48
8	Maryland	50
5	Duke	64
6	Virginia Tech	61
2	West Virginia	67
4	William & Mary	88

Semifinals; March 7
1	#8 NC State	54
8	Maryland	45
4	William & Mary	69
5	Duke	71

Finals; March 8
1	#8 NC State	67
5	Duke	63

* Overtime game

== See also ==
- List of Southern Conference men's basketball champions
