= 1956–57 West Virginia Mountaineers men's basketball team =

American college basketball season

1956–57 West Virginia Mountaineers men's basketball

Southern Conference champions

NCAA tournament, first round
- Conference: Southern Conference

Ranking
- AP: No. 7
- Record: 25–5 (12–0 SoCon)
- Head coach: Fred Schaus
- Home arena: WVU Field House

1956–57 Southern Conference men's basketball standings
	Conf.				Overall
Team	W		L	PCT	W		L	PCT
No. 7 West Virginia †	12	–	0	1.000	25	–	5	.833
Washington and Lee	10	–	3	.769	20	–	7	.741
Virginia Tech	12	–	5	.706	14	–	8	.636
Furman	7	–	5	.583	10	–	17	.370
Richmond	9	–	7	.563	15	–	11	.577
William & Mary	7	–	11	.389	9	–	18	.333
The Citadel	5	–	9	.357	11	–	14	.440
Davidson	4	–	8	.333	7	–	20	.259
George Washington	3	–	9	.250	3	–	21	.125
VMI	1	–	13	.071	4	–	22	.154
† Southern Conference Tournament winner Rankings from AP Poll

The 1956–57 West Virginia Mountaineers men's basketball team represented West Virginia University in NCAA college basketball competition in the 1956–57 season. Coached by Fred Schaus and competing in the Southern Conference, the Mountaineers started the season strong, beating their first eight opponents, which included 19th-ranked NC State. However, in the 1956 Dixie Classic, the undefeated streak fell apart, and West Virginia lost all three of their tournament games. The team regrouped and won their next 11, only losing one more game in the regular season. They cruised through the Southern Conference tournament, beating Davidson, Richmond, and Washington & Lee each by double-digit margins for their third consecutive Southern Conference championship. Their season came to an end when 20th-ranked Canisius felled them in the first round of the NCAA tournament.
