= 1954 Southern Conference men's basketball tournament =

- Classification: Division I
- Season: 1953–54
- Teams: 8
- Site: WVU Fieldhouse; Morgantown, WV
- Champions: George Washington (2nd title)
- Winning coach: Bill Reinhart (1st title)

1953–54 Southern Conference men's basketball standings
	Conf.				Overall
Team	W		L	PCT	W		L	PCT
No. 12 George Washington †	10	–	0	1.000	23	–	3	.885
Furman	6	–	1	.857	23	–	9	.719
Richmond	10	–	3	.769	23	–	8	.742
West Virginia	6	–	4	.600	12	–	11	.522
William & Mary	6	–	5	.545	9	–	14	.391
VMI	6	–	7	.462	11	–	12	.478
Davidson	3	–	5	.375	7	–	15	.318
Washington and Lee	3	–	9	.250	6	–	17	.261
Virginia Tech	3	–	13	.188	3	–	24	.111
The Citadel	1	–	7	.125	2	–	17	.105
† Southern Conference Tournament winner Rankings from AP Poll

The 1954 Southern Conference men's basketball tournament took place from March 4–6, 1954 at the West Virginia Fieldhouse in Morgantown, West Virginia. The George Washington Colonials, led by head coach Bill Reinhart, won their second Southern Conference title and received the automatic berth to the 1954 NCAA tournament.

== Format ==
The top eight finishers of the conference's ten members were eligible for the tournament. Teams were seeded based on conference winning percentage. The tournament used a preset bracket consisting of three rounds.

== Bracket ==
Quarterfinals; March 4
1	#9 George Washington	76
8	Washington and Lee	64
4	West Virginia	84
5	William & Mary	69
2	Furman	84
7	Davidson	68
3	Richmond	84
6	VMI	66

Semifinals; March 5
1	#9 George Washington	83
4	West Virginia	74
2	Furman	81
3	Richmond	85*

Finals; March 6
1	#9 George Washington	83
3	Richmond	70

* Overtime game

== See also ==
- List of Southern Conference men's basketball champions
