= 1955 ACC men's basketball tournament =

- Classification: Division I
- Season: 1954–55
- Teams: 8
- Site: Reynolds Coliseum; Raleigh, North Carolina
- Champions: NC State (2nd title)
- Winning coach: Everett Case (2nd title)
- MVP: Ronnie Shavlik (NC State)

1954–55 ACC men's basketball standings
	Conf.				Overall
Team	W		L	PCT	W		L	PCT
No. 4 NC State †	12	–	2	.857	28	–	4	.875
Duke	11	–	3	.786	20	–	8	.714
Maryland	10	–	4	.714	17	–	7	.708
Wake Forest	8	–	6	.571	17	–	10	.630
North Carolina	8	–	6	.571	10	–	11	.476
Virginia	5	–	9	.357	14	–	15	.483
South Carolina	2	–	12	.143	10	–	17	.370
Clemson	0	–	14	.000	2	–	21	.087
† 1955 ACC tournament winner Rankings from AP Poll

The 1955 Atlantic Coast Conference men's basketball tournament was held in Raleigh, North Carolina, at Reynolds Coliseum from March 3–5, 1955. NC State defeated Duke, 87–77, to win the championship. Ronnie Shavlik of NC State was named tournament MVP. However, as NC State was ineligible for the NCAA tournament due to violating NCAA rules, Duke earned the automatic bid to the 1955 NCAA basketball tournament.

== Bracket ==
Quarterfinals; March 3
1	#5 NC State	101
8	Clemson	76
4	Wake Forest	95
5	North Carolina	82
2	Duke	83
7	South Carolina	67
3	#18 Maryland	67
6	Virginia	68^{OT}

Semifinals; March 4
1	#5 NC State	85
4	Wake Forest	70
2	Duke	90^{OT}
6	Virginia	77

Championship Game; March 5
1	#5 NC State	87
2	Duke	77
