= Southern Textile Exposition =

Textile trade fair in South Carolina (1915–2004)

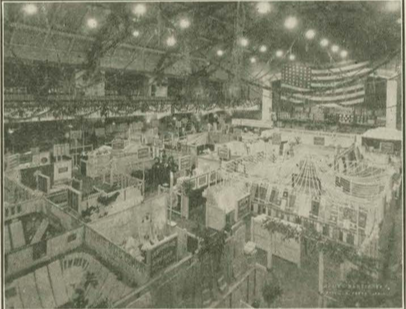
Southern Textile Exposition, 1920, Old Textile Hall, Greenville, South Carolina.

The Southern Textile Exposition (1915-2004) was an intermittent trade fair for textile manufacturers held in Greenville, South Carolina.

By the early 20th century, American textile production had moved into the Carolina Piedmont from its earlier center in New England. By the second decade of the century, South Carolina ranked second only to Massachusetts in textile production; and Greenville, located between Charlotte and Atlanta, was central to the industry.

In 1914, the Southern Textile Association approved the bid of Greenville mill owners to host the first textile machinery trade fair in the South. The first show, in 1915, was held in borrowed warehouses; but the trade fair was so successful that Greenville's Southern Textile Exposition, Inc. soon raised the money needed to build a permanent exhibition space, Textile Hall, on West Washington Street, which was effectively completed before the second exposition in 1917. In succeeding years the exhibition was often held biennially.

By 1946 Greenville could advertise itself as the "Textile Capital of the World," and by 1962 Textile Hall, even with nine annexes and additional leased space, proved inadequate to host the Textile Exposition. The Greenville corporation put up a larger building adjoining the Greenville Downtown Airport on the new U.S. Route 29-Bypass. In 1969 the Exposition joined with the American Textile Machinery Association to sponsor the American Textile Machinery Exhibition-International, the largest textile machinery show ever held in the United States.

By the end of the 20th century, low wages and new production capacity in countries such as China, India, and Brazil dramatically reduced textile production in the United States, especially in the Southeast. The Southern Textile Exposition was held in Greenville for a final time in 2004.
