= 1952–53 Duke Blue Devils men's basketball team =

American college basketball season

1952–53 Duke Blue Devils men's basketball

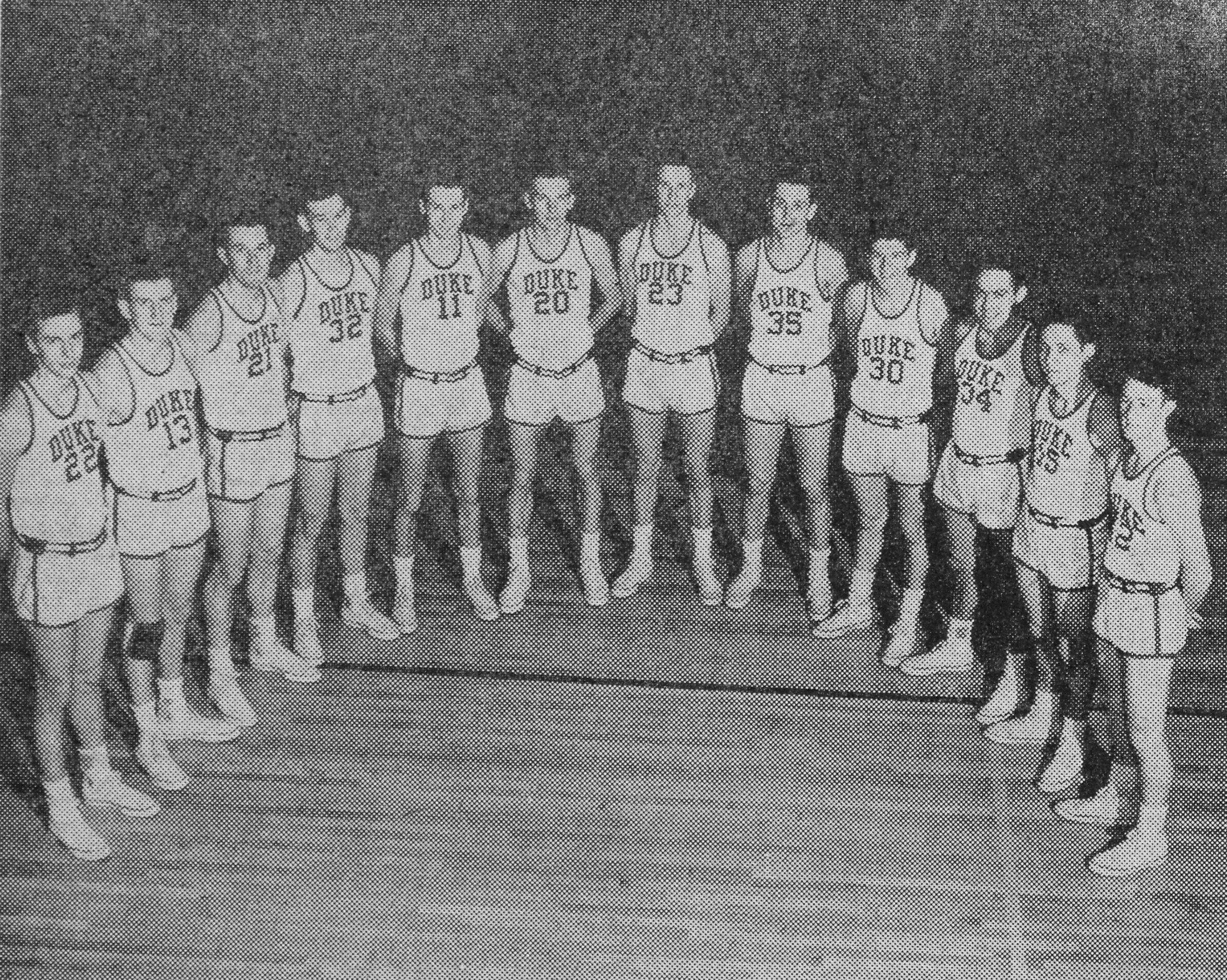
- Conference: Southern Conference
- Record: 17–8 (11–4 Southern)
- Head coach: Harold Bradley
- Home arena: Duke Indoor Stadium

1952–53 Southern Conference men's basketball standings
	Conf.				Overall
Team	W		L	PCT	W		L	PCT
No. 18 North Carolina State	13	–	3	.813	26	–	6	.813
No. 15 Wake Forest †	12	–	3	.800	19	–	6	.760
Maryland	12	–	3	.800	15	–	8	.652
West Virginia	11	–	3	.786	19	–	17	.528
Furman	10	–	3	.769	21	–	6	.778
Duke	12	–	4	.750	17	–	8	.680
Richmond	13	–	5	.722	21	–	7	.750
North Carolina	15	–	6	.714	17	–	10	.630
George Washington	12	–	6	.667	15	–	7	.682
Clemson	6	–	8	.429	8	–	10	.444
South Carolina	7	–	12	.368	11	–	13	.458
William & Mary	6	–	13	.316	10	–	13	.435
Virginia Tech	4	–	13	.235	4	–	19	.174
Davidson	3	–	14	.176	4	–	16	.200
VMI	1	–	14	.067	5	–	19	.208
Washington and Lee	1	–	17	.056	2	–	20	.091
The Citadel	0	–	11	.000	4	–	14	.222
† Southern Conference Tournament winner Rankings from AP Poll

The 1952–53 Duke Blue Devils men's basketball team represented Duke University during the 1952–53 men's college basketball season.

== Schedule ==
Date time, TV	Rank^{#}	Opponent^{#}	Result	Record	Site (attendance) city, state
December 1*		Vanderbilt	W 94–88	1–0	Duke Indoor Stadium; Durham, NC
December 6		Wake Forest	L 86–91	1–1 (0–1)	Duke Indoor Stadium (3,500); Durham, NC
December 9		at Washington & Lee	W 91–80	2–1 (1–1)	Lynchburg, VA
December 13*		at Tennessee	W 89–82	3–1	Alumni Memorial Gym; Knoxville, TN
December 16		Davidson	W 94–65	4–1 (2–1)	Duke Indoor Stadium; Durham, NC
December 20*		at Temple	L 64–67	4–2	Philadelphia, PA
December 22		at George Washington	L 87–113	4–3 (2–2)	Uline Arena; Washington, D.C.
December 29*		vs. BYU; Dixie Classic	L 68–69	4–4	Reynolds Coliseum; Raleigh, NC
December 30*; 7:30 p.m.		vs. Pennsylvania; Dixie Classic	L 80–97	4–5	Reynolds Coliseum; Raleigh, NC
December 31*		vs. Princeton; Dixie Classic	W 74–59	5–5	Reynolds Coliseum; Raleigh, NC
January 7		at South Carolina	W 76–67	6–5 (3–2)	Carolina Fieldhouse; Columbia, SC
January 10		NC State	L 64–82	6–6 (3–3)	Duke Indoor Stadium (8,000); Durham, NC
January 13		VMI	W 78–55	7–6 (4–3)	Duke Indoor Stadium; Durham, NC
January 31*		Navy	W 78–73	8–6	Duke Indoor Stadium; Durham, NC
February 3*		West Virginia	W 91–86	9–6	Duke Indoor Stadium; Durham, NC
February 5*		NYU	W 89–82	10–6	Duke Indoor Stadium; Durham, NC
February 6		at No. 12 North Carolina; Rivalry	W 95–89	11–6 (5–3)	Woollen Gymnasium (5,500); Chapel Hill, NC
February 9		George Washington	W 83–80	12–6 (6–3)	Duke Indoor Stadium; Durham, NC
February 12		at Wake Forest	W 101–99 ^{OT}	13–6 (7–3)	Gore Gymnasium; Winston-Salem, NC
February 14		at No. 12 NC State	W 84–82	14–6 (8–3)	Reynolds Coliseum (12,000); Raleigh, NC
February 19	No. 18	at William & Mary	L 82–85 ^{OT}	14–7 (8–4)	Williamsburg, VA
February 21	No. 18	South Carolina	W 98–68	15–7 (9–4)	Duke Indoor Stadium; Durham, NC
February 23	No. 18	at Davidson	W 99–72	16–7 (10–4)	Johnston Gym; Davidson, NC
February 27		North Carolina	W 83–58	17–7 (11–4)	Duke Indoor Stadium; Durham, NC
March 5*		vs. Maryland; Southern Conference tournament	L 65–74	17–8	Reynolds Coliseum; Raleigh, NC
*Non-conference game. ^{#}Rankings from AP Poll. (#) Tournament seedings in parentheses. All times are in Eastern Standard Time.
