= 1958–59 Atlantic Coast Conference men's basketball season =

== Final standings ==
Team	ACC Regular Season	Regular season %	All Games	All Games %	Nonconference Games	Ranked AP All	Ranked AP Nonconference
NC State	12–2	.857	22–4	.846			
North Carolina	12–2	.857	20–5	.800			
Duke	7–7	.500	13–12	.520			
Maryland	7–7	.500	10–13	.435			
Virginia	6–8	.429	11–14	.440			
Wake Forest	5–9	.357	10–14	.417			
Clemson	5–9	.357	8–16	.333			
South Carolina	2–12	.143	4–20	.167			
Total			98–98	.500			

== ACC tournament ==
See 1959 ACC men's basketball tournament

== NCAA tournament ==
=== Round of 23 ===
Navy 76, North Carolina 63

=== NCAA record ===
0–1

== NIT ==
League rules prevented ACC teams from playing in the NIT, 1954–1966
