= Old Textile Hall =

Former trade hall in Greenville, South Carolina

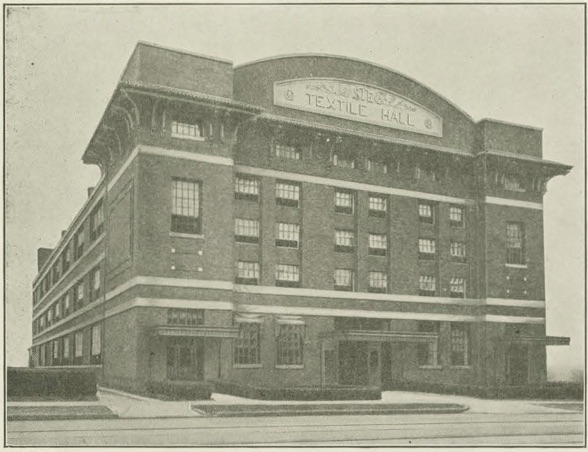
Old Textile Hall, 1922.

Old Textile Hall was a former building in Greenville, South Carolina, which from 1917 to 1962, hosted the Southern Textile Exposition, a trade fair for textile machinery. The building also functioned as a municipal auditorium for Greenville until 1958. Old Textile Hall was listed on the National Register of Historic Places in 1980, but it was removed after the building was demolished in 1992.

By the early 20th century, American textile production had clearly moved into the Carolina Piedmont from its earlier center in New England. In 1900, a New York Times correspondent noted that prosperity in Greenville was "evident on all sides" and that mill owners there made huge profits. By the second decade of the century, South Carolina was ranked second only to Massachusetts in textile production; and Greenville, located between Charlotte and Atlanta, was central to the industry.

In 1914, the Southern Textile Association approved the bid of Greenville mill owners to host the first textile machinery trade fair in the South. The first show, in 1915, was held in borrowed warehouses; but the trade fair was so successful that Greenville's Southern Textile Exposition, Inc. soon raised donations for the building of a permanent exhibition hall, which was effectively completed for the second exposition in 1917.

The five-story building, approximately 101 by 235 feet, was designed by J. E. Sirrine and Company in Renaissance Revival style and was built by Fiske-Carter Construction Company on West Washington Street, near its intersection with Academy Street, in the western part of Greenville's central business district. The building had load bearing brick perimeter walls that incorporated "horizontal reinforced concrete and granolithic bond beams." Its auditorium, on the second level, included a stage and a balcony; and the tongue-and-groove maple floors were designed to accommodate operating textile machinery.

From 1917 until 1962, the Southern Textile Exposition held trade shows, usually biennially; and for most of those years, they were directed by W. G. "Bill" Sirrine, a prosperous Greenville lawyer and landowner. The 4,000-seat Textile Hall was also used for other kinds of trade shows and for dances, concerts, movies, pageants, conventions, religious revivals, high school graduations, and basketball games, including the annual Southern Piedmont Textile Basketball Tournament.

By 1962 Textile Hall had built or leased nine annexes, but even the additional space now proved inadequate for the Textile Exposition, and a new building was built adjoining the Greenville Downtown Airport. From 1962 until 1978, the old building was used only for storage. Some efforts were made to repurpose the building as a concert venue, and during this period, it was added to the National Register of Historic Places. Eventually the Greenville fire marshal condemned the building, and it was purchased and demolished by neighboring St. Mary's Catholic Church in 1992.
