= 1951–52 Princeton Tigers men's basketball team =

American college basketball season

1951–52 Princeton Tigers men's basketball
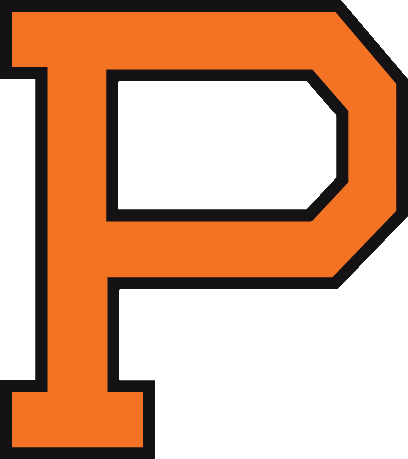

EIBL Champions

1952 NCAA Division I men's basketball tournament, Regional 4th place
- Conference: Eastern Intercollegiate Basketball League
- Record: 16–11 (10–2, 1st EIBL)
- Head coach: Franklin Cappon
- Captain: Chuck DeVoe
- Home arena: Dillon Gymnasium

The 1951–52 Princeton Tigers men's basketball team represented Princeton University in intercollegiate college basketball during the 1951–52 NCAA men's basketball season. The head coach was Franklin Cappon and the team captain was Chuck DeVoe. The team played its home games in the Dillon Gymnasium on the university campus in Princeton, New Jersey. The team was the winner of the Eastern Intercollegiate Basketball League (EIBL).

The team posted a 16–11 overall record and a 10–2 conference record. During the season, after winning the first three games the team lost six in a row and eight of ten before winning eleven consecutive games. The team then lost the conference finale against Penn Quakers. The team earned an invitation to the sixteen-team 1952 NCAA Division I men's basketball tournament, where it lost to the Duquesne Dukes by a 60–49 margin on March 21, 1952, at the Chicago Stadium in the first round and then subsequently lost to the Dayton Flyers by a 77–61 margin the next night in a consolation game. This was Princeton's first invitation to the NCAA Division I men's basketball tournament.
