= 1951–52 Washington Huskies men's basketball team =

American college basketball season

1951–52 Washington Huskies men's basketball

PCC Northern Division Champions
- Conference: Pacific Coast Conference

Ranking
- Coaches: No. 5
- AP: No. 6
- Record: 25–6 (14–2 PCC)
- Head coach: Tippy Dye (2nd season)
- Home arena: Hec Edmundson Pavilion

1951–52 Pacific Coast Conference men's basketball standings
	Conf.				Overall
Team	W		L	PCT	W		L	PCT
North
No. 6 Washington	14	–	2	.875	25	–	6	.806
Idaho	9	–	7	.563	19	–	13	.594
Oregon	8	–	8	.500	14	–	16	.467
Washington State	6	–	10	.375	19	–	16	.543
Oregon State	3	–	13	.188	9	–	19	.321
South
No. 19 UCLA †	8	–	4	.667	19	–	12	.613
Stanford	6	–	6	.500	19	–	8	.704
California	6	–	6	.500	17	–	13	.567
USC	4	–	8	.333	16	–	14	.533
† Conference playoff series winner Rankings from AP Poll

The 1951–52 Washington Huskies men's basketball team represented the University of Washington for the 1951–52 NCAA college basketball season. Led by second-year head coach Tippy Dye, the Huskies were members of the Pacific Coast Conference and played their home games on campus at Hec Edmundson Pavilion in Seattle, Washington.

The Huskies were 24–4 overall in the regular season and 14–2 in conference play; in the PCC title series in Los Angeles against Southern division winner UCLA, the underdog Bruins won in three games, but lost early in the NCAA tournament. The Final Four was played on the Huskies' home floor, which were won by Kansas.

Washington returned to the NCAA Tournament the next year, and advanced to the Final Four.

== Postseason results ==
Date time, TV	Rank^{#}	Opponent^{#}	Result	Record	Site (attendance) city, state
Pacific Coast Conference Playoff Series
Fri, March 7; 8:30 pm	No. 6	No. 19 UCLA; Game One	L 53–65	24–5	UCLA Men's Gym; Los Angeles, California
Sat, March 8; 8:30 pm	No. 6	No. 19 UCLA; Game Two	W 53–50	25–5	UCLA Men's Gym; Los Angeles, California
Mon, March 10; 8:30 pm	No. 6	No. 19 UCLA; Game Three	L 50–60	25–6	UCLA Men's Gym; Los Angeles, California
*Non-conference game. ^{#}Rankings from AP Poll. (#) Tournament seedings in parentheses. All times are in Pacific time.
