= 1952 SEC men's basketball tournament =

- Classification: Division I
- Season: 1951–52
- Teams: 12
- Site: Jefferson County Armory; Louisville, Kentucky
- Champions: Kentucky (13th title)
- Winning coach: Adolph Rupp (13th title)
- MVP: None

1951–52 Southeastern Conference men's basketball standings
	Conf.				Overall
Team	W		L	PCT	W		L	PCT
No. 1 Kentucky †	14	–	0	1.000	29	–	3	.906
LSU	9	–	5	.643	17	–	7	.708
Vanderbilt	9	–	5	.643	18	–	9	.667
Alabama	9	–	5	.643	13	–	9	.591
Ole Miss	8	–	6	.571	15	–	11	.577
Florida	7	–	7	.500	15	–	9	.625
Tennessee	7	–	7	.500	13	–	9	.591
Tulane	7	–	7	.500	12	–	12	.500
Auburn	6	–	8	.429	14	–	12	.538
Mississippi State	4	–	10	.286	12	–	11	.522
Georgia Tech	2	–	12	.143	7	–	15	.318
Georgia	2	–	12	.143	3	–	22	.120
† 1952 SEC Tournament winner Rankings from AP Poll

The 1952 SEC men's basketball tournament took place February 28–March 1, 1952 in Louisville, Kentucky at the Jefferson County Armory. It was the nineteenth SEC tournament and the final edition before its 26-year hiatus.

The Kentucky Wildcats won the tournament championship game by beating LSU, 44–43. Kentucky would go on to play in the 1952 NCAA tournament, but fell in the East Regional Final to St. John's.

The next tournament would not be held until 1979. From 1953 until 1978, the SEC awarded its championship and NCAA tournament bid to the team with the best record in conference play.

== Bracket ==
First Round; February 28
LSU	77
Mississippi State	44
Vanderbilt	61
Georgia	49
Alabama	63
Auburn	49
#1 Kentucky	80
Georgia Tech	59

Second Round; February 29
Ole Miss	60
LSU	75
Florida	66
Vanderbilt	63
Tennessee	61
Alabama	60
Tulane	61
#1 Kentucky	85

Semifinals; March 1
LSU	77
Florida	69
Tennessee	66
#1 Kentucky	81

Championship; March 1
LSU	43
#1 Kentucky	44
