= 1951–52 Idaho Vandals men's basketball team =

American college basketball season

1951–52 Idaho Vandals men's basketball
- Conference: Pacific Coast Conference
- Record: 19–13 (9–7 PCC)
- Head coach: Charles Finley (5th season)
- MVP: Herb Millard
- Home arena: Memorial Gymnasium

1951–52 Pacific Coast Conference men's basketball standings
	Conf.				Overall
Team	W		L	PCT	W		L	PCT
North
No. 6 Washington	14	–	2	.875	25	–	6	.806
Idaho	9	–	7	.563	19	–	13	.594
Oregon	8	–	8	.500	14	–	16	.467
Washington State	6	–	10	.375	19	–	16	.543
Oregon State	3	–	13	.188	9	–	19	.321
South
No. 19 UCLA †	8	–	4	.667	19	–	12	.613
Stanford	6	–	6	.500	19	–	8	.704
California	6	–	6	.500	17	–	13	.567
USC	4	–	8	.333	16	–	14	.533
† Conference playoff series winner Rankings from AP Poll

The 1951–52 Idaho Vandals men's basketball team represented the University of Idaho during the 1951–52 NCAA college basketball season. Members of the Pacific Coast Conference, the Vandals were led by fifth-year head coach Charles Finley and played their home games on campus at Memorial Gymnasium in Moscow, Idaho.

The Vandals were 19–13 overall and 9–7 in conference play.

In early January, Idaho upset the third-ranked Washington Huskies at Hec Edmundson Pavilion in Seattle.
