= Chuck DeVoe =

- Full name: Leslie Charles Devoe
- Born: March 18, 1930 Indianapolis, Indiana, U.S.
- Died: December 28, 2013 (aged 83) Indianapolis, Indiana, U.S.
- Height: 6 ft 0 in (183 cm)
- College: Princeton University

Leslie Charles DeVoe (March 18, 1930 – December 28, 2013) was an American athlete and businessman who was a founder of the Indiana Pacers of the American Basketball Association.

== Basketball ==
DeVoe played basketball and football at the Park School in Indianapolis and was a member of the Princeton Tigers men's basketball team from 1949 to 1952. He was named most valuable player of the 1951 MSC Classic after scoring 21 points against Minnesota and putting up 15 in a finals loss to Michigan State. He averaged 10 points per game over his career. He was team captain his senior season and helped lead them to an Eastern Intercollegiate Basketball League title and Princeton's first NCAA basketball tournament appearance. He was awarded the B. Franklin Bunn Trophy as Princeton's most valuable basketball player for the 1951–52 season.

== Tennis ==
DeVoe was a nationally ranked junior tennis player and played in the 1949, 1950, and 1951 U.S. National Championships (now known as the US Open). He lettered in tennis at Princeton in 1950, 1951, and 1952 and helped lead the team to an Eastern Intercollegiate Tennis Association each season. In 1966, the 36-year-old DeVoe upset 21-year-old NCAA champion Charlie Pasarell in the first round of the Western Tennis Championship in Indianapolis. DeVoe was a very successful senior tennis player, capturing 64 United States Tennis Association senior single and doubles national championships.

== Business ==
DeVoe was president of L. M. DeVoe Co., an electronics firm founded by his father. He was a co-founder of the Indiana Pacers of the American Basketball Association and was team president from 1968 to 1975. The Pacers won the ABA title in 1970, 1972, and 1973, but were unable to turn a profit. In 1975, the club's original investors sold the team to Tom Binford.

DeVoe was also chairman of Market Square Associates, which managed the Market Square Arena. In 1973, he, Dick Tinkham, and Charlie Finley reached an agreement in principle to move the National Hockey League's California Golden Seals to Market Square Arena. The relocation was denied by the NHL with, 13 owners voting against, two voting in favor, and one team not attending the meeting. DeVoe later help found the Indianapolis Racers of the World Hockey Association.

== Death ==
DeVoe was diagnosed with melanoma in September 2013. He died on December 28, 2013.
