= 1951–52 UCLA Bruins men's basketball team =

American college basketball season

1951–52 UCLA Bruins men's basketball

PCC Southern Division

NCAA tournament, L Regional consolation Game
- Conference: Pacific Coast Conference

Ranking
- Coaches: No. 20
- AP: No. 19
- Record: 19–12 (8–4 PCC)
- Head coach: John R. Wooden (4th season)
- Assistant coaches: Eddie Powell; Alan Sawyer
- Home arena: Men's Gym

1951–52 Pacific Coast Conference men's basketball standings
	Conf.				Overall
Team	W		L	PCT	W		L	PCT
North
No. 6 Washington	14	–	2	.875	25	–	6	.806
Idaho	9	–	7	.563	19	–	13	.594
Oregon	8	–	8	.500	14	–	16	.467
Washington State	6	–	10	.375	19	–	16	.543
Oregon State	3	–	13	.188	9	–	19	.321
South
No. 19 UCLA †	8	–	4	.667	19	–	12	.613
Stanford	6	–	6	.500	19	–	8	.704
California	6	–	6	.500	17	–	13	.567
USC	4	–	8	.333	16	–	14	.533
† Conference playoff series winner Rankings from AP Poll

The 1951–52 UCLA Bruins men's basketball team represented the University of California, Los Angeles during the 1951–52 NCAA men's basketball season and were members of the Pacific Coast Conference. The Bruins were led by fourth year head coach John Wooden. They finished the regular season with a record of 19–12 and won the PCC Southern Division with a record of 8–4. UCLA defeated the Washington Huskies in the conference play-offs and lost to Santa Clara in the NCAA regional semifinals and Oklahoma City in the regional consolation game.

== Previous season ==
The Bruins finished the regular season with a record of 19–10 and tied for the southern division championship with a record of 9–4. The Bruins lost to the Washington Huskies in the conference play-offs.

== Roster ==
1951–52 UCLA Bruins men's basketball team
Players
Coaches

Pos.	#	Name	Height	Weight	Year	Hometown
F	57	Ron Bane	6 ft 2 in (1.88 m)	—	Fr
F	56	Don Bragg	6 ft 4 in (1.93 m)	—	Fr
G		Mark Costello	6 ft 2 in (1.88 m)	—	Fr	El Monte, California
G	72	Jack Davidson	6 ft 2 in (1.88 m)	—	Jr
F	59	Jerry Evans	6 ft 3 in (1.91 m)	—
F		Mike Hibler	6 ft 7 in (2.01 m)	—	So
G	73	Don Johnson (C)	6 ft 3 in (1.91 m)	195 lb (88 kg)	Sr
G	75	Ron Livingston	5 ft 10 in (1.78 m)	—	So
G	70	Gene Logan	6 ft 1 in (1.85 m)	—
F	32	John Moore	6 ft 5 in (1.96 m)	—	Fr
F	52	Jerry Norman (C)	6 ft 0 in (1.83 m)	—	Sr
G	71	Barry Porter	6 ft 1 in (1.85 m)	—	So
G	71	Barry Porter	6 ft 1 in (1.85 m)	—	Jr
	53	Bobby Pounds	—	—	Sr

Head coach

John Wooden (Purdue)

Assistant coach(es)

- Eddie Powell (Indiana St)
- Alan Sawyer (UCLA)

Legend

- (C) Team captain
- (S) Suspended
- (I) Ineligible
- (W) Walk-on
- Injured
- Current redshirt

Roster
Last update: 30 January 2018

== Schedule ==
Date time, TV	Rank^{#}	Opponent^{#}	Result	Record	Site city, state
Regular Season
December 1, 1951*		Arizona State	W 85–56	1–0	Men's Gym; Los Angeles, CA
December 7, 1951		at Washington	L 52–60	1–1	Hec Edmundson Pavilion; Seattle, WA
December 8, 1951		at Washington	L 61–76	1–2	Hec Edmundson Pavilion; Seattle, WA
December 14, 1951*		San Francisco	W 64–55	2–2	Men's Gym; Los Angeles, CA
December 15, 1951*		West Texas State	W 64–57	3–2	Men's Gym; Los Angeles, CA
December 21, 1951*		Denver	W 60–58	4–2	Men's Gym; Los Angeles, CA
December 22, 1951*		Denver	W 60–51	5–2	Men's Gym; Los Angeles, CA
December 26, 1951*	No. 16	at No. 1 Kentucky	L 53–84	5–3	Memorial Coliseum; Lexington, KY
December 28, 1951*	No. 16	at No. 2 Illinois	L 67–73	5–4	Huff Hall; Champaign, IL
December 29, 1951*		at Bradley	W 67–66	6–4	Robertson Memorial Field House; Peoria, IL
January 4, 1952		Stanford	W 81–63	7–4 (1–0)	Men's Gym; Los Angeles, CA
January 5, 1952		Stanford	L 71–73	7–5 (1–1)	Men's Gym; Los Angeles, CA
January 11, 1952		at USC	W 55–48	8–5 (2–1)	Pan-Pacific Auditorium; Los Angeles, CA
January 12, 1952		at USC	W 67–58	9–5 (3–1)	Pan-Pacific Auditorium; Los Angeles, CA
January 18, 1952		at California	W 69–61	9–6 (3–2)	Men's Gym; Berkeley, CA
January 19, 1952		at California	L 51–54	9–7 (3–3)	Men's Gym; Berkeley, CA
February 1, 1952*		vs. Saint Mary's	W 70–62	10–7	Cow Palace; Daly City, CA
February 2, 1952*		vs. Santa Clara	L 59–66	10–8	Cow Palace; Daly City, CA
February 8, 1952*		Pepperdine	W 72–70	11–8	Men's Gym; Los Angeles, CA
February 9, 1952*		Cal Poly	W 67–40	12–8	Men's Gym; Los Angeles, CA
February 15, 1952		at Stanford	W 72–68	13–8 (4–3)	Stanford Pavilion; Stanford, CA
February 16, 1952		at Stanford	L 68–77	13–9 (4–4)	Stanford Pavilion; Stanford, CA
February 22, 1952		California	W 67–54	14–9 (5–4)	Men's Gym; Los Angeles, CA
February 23, 1952		California	W 68–42	15–9 (6–4)	Men's Gym; Los Angeles, CA
February 29, 1952		USC	W 66–51	16–9 (7–4)	Men's Gym; Los Angeles, CA
March 1, 1952		USC	W 63–57	17–9 (8–4)	Men's Gym; Los Angeles, CA
Conference Championship
March 7, 1952	No. 19	No. 6 Washington; PCC Championship play-offs	W 65–53	18–9	Men's Gym; Los Angeles, CA
March 8, 1952	No. 19	No. 6 Washington; PCC Championship play-offs	L 50–53	18–10	Men's Gym; Los Angeles, CA
March 10, 1952	No. 19	No. 6 Washington; PCC Championship play-offs	W 60–50	19–10	Men's Gym; Los Angeles, CA
NCAA tournament
March 21, 1952*	No. 19	vs. Santa Clara; Regional semifinals	L 59–68	19–11	Oregon State Coliseum; Corvallis, OR
March 22, 1952*	No. 19	vs. Oklahoma City; Regional consolation Game	L 53–55	19–12	Oregon State Coliseum; Corvallis, OR
*Non-conference game. ^{#}Rankings from AP Poll. (#) Tournament seedings in parentheses. All times are in Pacific Time.
