= 1951–52 Washington State Cougars men's basketball team =

American college basketball season

1951–52 Washington State Cougars men's basketball
- Conference: Pacific Coast Conference
- Record: 19–16 (6–10 PCC)
- Head coach: Jack Friel (24th season)
- Home arena: Bohler Gymnasium

1951–52 Pacific Coast Conference men's basketball standings
	Conf.				Overall
Team	W		L	PCT	W		L	PCT
North
No. 6 Washington	14	–	2	.875	25	–	6	.806
Idaho	9	–	7	.563	19	–	13	.594
Oregon	8	–	8	.500	14	–	16	.467
Washington State	6	–	10	.375	19	–	16	.543
Oregon State	3	–	13	.188	9	–	19	.321
South
No. 19 UCLA †	8	–	4	.667	19	–	12	.613
Stanford	6	–	6	.500	19	–	8	.704
California	6	–	6	.500	17	–	13	.567
USC	4	–	8	.333	16	–	14	.533
† Conference playoff series winner Rankings from AP Poll

The 1951–52 Washington State Cougars men's basketball team represented Washington State College for the 1951–52 NCAA college basketball season. Led by 24th-year head coach Jack Friel, the Cougars were members of the Pacific Coast Conference and played their home games on campus at Bohler Gymnasium in Pullman, Washington.

The Cougars were 19–16 overall in the regular season and 6–10 in conference play, fourth in the Northern division.
