= 1951–52 Santa Clara Broncos men's basketball team =

American college basketball season

1951–52 Santa Clara Broncos men's basketball

NCAA tournament, Fourth Place
- Conference: Independent
- Record: 17–12
- Head coach: Bob Feerick (2nd season)
- Home arena: San Jose Civic Auditorium

The 1951–52 Santa Clara Broncos men's basketball team represented Santa Clara University as an Independent during the 1951–52 NCAA men's basketball season. They finished the season with a 17–12 record and made the NCAA tournament Final Four for the first time school history. They were led by second-year head coach Bob Feerick.

Coming into the 1951–52 season off of a 9–15 record the year before, the Broncos remained under the radar. Even during the 1952 Final Four season they were inconsistent: through the first 14 games the Broncos went 7–7, including a three-game losing streak. They found their rhythm on February 1 against San Francisco State. The Broncos' 67–51 victory began a streak in which Santa Clara won eight of their final 11 games, capped by an improbable deep NCAA Tournament run. In the NCAA West Regional they won their opening match against UCLA, 68–59. The next day, the Broncos topped Wyoming, 56–53, to advance to the national semifinals.

Santa Clara would go on to lose to Kansas in the Final Four by a score of 55–74. They then lost again in the third-place game, falling 64–67 to Illinois, ending the NCAA tournament in fourth place – Santa Clara's best ever finish.

== Schedule and results ==
Date time, TV	Rank^{#}	Opponent^{#}	Result	Record	Site city, state
Regular Season
December 1, 1951*		vs. Sacramento State	W 62–50	1–0	Santa Clara High School; Santa Clara, California
December 4*		Fresno State	W 63–50	2–0	Seifert Gymnasium; Santa Clara, California
December 7*		at California	L 51–69	2–1	Berkeley, California
December 14*		vs. San Francisco YMI	W 76–59	3–1	Santa Clara High School; Santa Clara, California
December 21*		at BYU	L 59–64	3–2	Smith Fieldhouse; Provo, Utah
December 22*		at BYU	L 61–66	3–3	Smith Fieldhouse; Provo, Utah
December 27*		at Denver	L 59–65	3–4	Denver, Colorado
December 29*		at Utah State	W 63–62	4–4	George Nelson Fieldhouse; Logan, Utah
January 2, 1952*		at Saint Mary's	L 53–54	4–5	Richmond Auditorium; Richmond, California
January 4*		at Fresno State	W 69–63	5–5	College Gym; Fresno, California
January 5*		at Pacific	W 75–51	6–5	Pacific Pavilion; Stockton, California
January 11*		vs. Loyola Marymount	L 54–61	6–6	Archbishop Riordan High School; San Francisco, California
January 15*		Saint Mary's	W 65–51	7–6	San Jose Civic Auditorium; Santa Clara, California
January 26*		San Francisco	L 38–44	7–7	Winterland; San Francisco, California
February 1*		vs. San Francisco State	W 67–51	8–7	Cow Palace; Daly City, California
February 2*		vs. UCLA	W 66–59	9–7	Cow Palace; Daly City, California
February 8*		vs. USC	L 57–59	9–8	Cow Palace; Daly City, California
February 9*		Stanford	L 64–70	9–9	San Jose Civic Auditorium; Santa Clara, California
February 12*		Pacific	W 61–49	10–9	San Jose Civic Auditorium; Santa Clara, California
February 18*		San Francisco	W 59–58	11–9	San Jose Civic Auditorium; Santa Clara, California
February 21*		vs. San Jose State	W 66–55	12–9	Cow Palace; Daly City, California
February 22*		vs. San Francisco	W 51–50	13–9	Cow Palace; Daly City, California
February 27*		at Hawaii	W 71–52	14–9	Honolulu, Hawaii
February 29*		vs. Universal Motors	W 72–59	15–9	Honolulu, Hawaii
March 1*		vs. Hickam Field	L 56–57	15–10	Honolulu, Hawaii
NCAA Tournament
March 21*		vs. No. 19 UCLA; West Regional first round	W 68–59	16–10	Oregon State Coliseum; Corvallis, Oregon
March 22*		vs. No. 16 Wyoming; West regional final	W 56–53	17–10	Oregon State Coliseum; Corvallis, Oregon
March 25*		vs. No. 8 Kansas; National semifinal – Final Four	L 55–74	17–11	Bank of America Arena; Seattle, Washington
March 26*		vs. No. 2 Illinois; Third-place game	L 64–67	17–12	Bank of America Arena; Seattle, Washington
*Non-conference game. ^{#}Rankings from AP Poll. (#) Tournament seedings in parentheses. W=West. All times are in Pacific Time.
