= George McCarty =

Biographical details
- Born: October 15, 1915; Bassett, Texas, U.S.
- Died: November 30, 2011 (aged 96); Marble Falls, Texas, U.S.

Playing career

Football
- 1938: New Mexico A&M

Coaching career (HC unless noted)

Basketball
- 1949–1953: New Mexico A&M
- 1953–1959: Texas Western

Administrative career (AD unless noted)
- 1959–1970: Texas Western / UTEP
- 1970–1980: Wyoming

Head coaching record
- Overall: 140–113

George Courtney McCarty (October 15, 1915 – November 30, 2011) was an American college basketball coach and athletic director.

McCarty attended and played football at New Mexico State University. His college career was interrupted by World War II as he was drafted into the U. S. Army. McCarty served until 1946 and reached the rank of lieutenant colonel as a pilot and flight instructor.

McCarty's college coaching career began at his alma mater, as he led the Aggies to a 65–55 record from 1949 to 1953. He then moved to UTEP, where he coached from 1953 to 1959. He compiled a record of 75–58 and broke the color barrier at UTEP, recruiting the program's first African-American player, Charles Brown.

Following his stint as head coach of the Miners, McCarty was named athletic director at UTEP, a position he held until 1970. During this time, he hired future Hall of Fame coach Don Haskins - who brought UTEP their only national basketball championship in 1966. In 1970, McCarty left UTEP to become athletic director at the University of Wyoming, where he served until 1980. He retired to Albuquerque, where he ran the fund-raising efforts of the school's athletic club.

McCarty died November 30, 2011, at his home in Marble Falls, Texas.

== Head coaching record ==
Record table
Season	Team	Overall	Conference	Standing	Postseason
New Mexico A&M Aggies (Border Intercollegiate Athletic Association) (1949–1953)
1949–50	New Mexico A&M	17–13	7–11		NAIA First Round
1950–51	New Mexico A&M	19–14	10–6	T–2nd	
1951–52	New Mexico A&M	22–11	14–4	T–1st	NCAA first round
1952–53	New Mexico A&M	7–17	5–9	T–5th	
New Mexico A&M:		65–55 (.542)	36–30 (.545)		
Texas Western Miners (Border Intercollegiate Athletic Association) (1953–1959)
1953–54	Texas Western	8–14	4–8	T–5th	
1954–55	Texas Western	13–8	8–4	T–3rd	
1955–56	Texas Western	12–10	7–5	T–2nd	
1956–57	Texas Western	14–8	8–2	1st	
1957–58	Texas Western	14–9	5–5	3rd	
1958–59	Texas Western	14–9	7–3	T–1st	
Texas Western:		75–58 (.564)	39–27 (.591)		
Total:		123–100 (.552)			
National champion Postseason invitational champion Conference regular season champion Conference regular season and conference tournament champion Division regular season champion Division regular season and conference tournament champion Conference tournament champion
