= 1951–52 Georgia Bulldogs basketball team =

American college basketball season

1951–52 Georgia Bulldogs basketball
- Conference: Southeastern Conference
- Record: 3–22 (2–12 SEC)
- Head coach: Harbin Lawson (1st season)
- Captain: Jim Umbricht
- Home arena: Woodruff Hall

1951–52 Southeastern Conference men's basketball standings
	Conf.				Overall
Team	W		L	PCT	W		L	PCT
No. 1 Kentucky †	14	–	0	1.000	29	–	3	.906
LSU	9	–	5	.643	17	–	7	.708
Vanderbilt	9	–	5	.643	18	–	9	.667
Alabama	9	–	5	.643	13	–	9	.591
Ole Miss	8	–	6	.571	15	–	11	.577
Florida	7	–	7	.500	15	–	9	.625
Tennessee	7	–	7	.500	13	–	9	.591
Tulane	7	–	7	.500	12	–	12	.500
Auburn	6	–	8	.429	14	–	12	.538
Mississippi State	4	–	10	.286	12	–	11	.522
Georgia Tech	2	–	12	.143	7	–	15	.318
Georgia	2	–	12	.143	3	–	22	.120
† 1952 SEC Tournament winner Rankings from AP Poll

The 1951–52 Georgia Bulldogs basketball team represented the University of Georgia as a member of the Southeastern Conference (SEC) during the 1951–52 NCAA men's basketball season. Led by first-year head coach Harbin Lawson, the Bulldogs compiled an overall record of 3–22 with a mark of 2–12 conference play, tying for 11th place at the bottom of the SEC standings. The team captain was Jim Umbricht.

== Roster ==
1951–52 Georgia Bulldogs men's basketball team
Players
Coaches

Pos.	#	Name	Height	Weight	Year	Previous school	Hometown
G		Zippy Morocco	5 ft 10 in (1.78 m)	—	Jr
		Jim Umbricht	—	—

Head coach

Harbin Lawson

Assistant coach(es)

Legend

- (C) Team captain
- (S) Suspended
- (I) Ineligible
- (W) Walk-on
- Injured
- Current redshirt

== Schedule ==
Date time, TV	Opponent	Result	Record	Site city, state
12/1/1951	at Clemson	L 47-57	0–1	
12/3/1951	at Mercer	L 61-66	0–2	
12/5/1951	Clemson	L 54-77	0–3	Athens, GA
12/8/1951	Auburn	L 48-62	0–4	Athens, GA
12/26/1951	Florida State	W 79-50	1–4	Athens, GA
12/28/1951	Florida	L 47-62	1–5	Athens, GA
12/29/1951	Clemson	L 60-85	1–6	Athens, GA
1/5/1952	at Mississippi State	L 55-88	1–7	
1/7/1952	at Mississippi	L 52-103	1–8	
1/12/1952	South Carolina	L 63-80	1–9	Athens, GA
1/14/1952	Kentucky	L 55-95	1–10	Athens, GA
1/16/1952	Florida	L 55-74	1–11	Athens, GA
1/18/1952	at LSU	L 60-98	1–12	
1/19/1952	at Tulane	L 49-82	1–13	
1/22/1952	Mercer	L 48-63	1–14	Athens, GA
1/26/1952	at Auburn	L 51-65	1–15	
1/28/1952	Tennessee	L 62-68	1–16	Athens, GA
1/31/1952	at South Carolina	L 61-62	1–17	
2/6/1952	Georgia Tech	W 72-64	2–17	Athens, GA
2/9/1952	Alabama	W 53-51	3–17	Athens, GA
2/12/1952	at Florida	L 60-74	3–18	
2/16/1952	Vanderbilt	L 51-73	3–19	Athens, GA
2/19/1952	at Alabama	L 56-74	3–20	
2/23/1952	at Georgia Tech	L 73-79	3–21	
2/28/1952	Vanderbilt	L 49-61	3–22	Athens, GA
*Non-conference game. (#) Tournament seedings in parentheses.
