= 1951–52 Kentucky Wildcats men's basketball team =

1951–52 season of University of Kentucky men's basketball team

1951–52 Kentucky Wildcats men's basketball

NCAA regular season champions SEC regular season and tournament champions

NCAA tournament, Elite Eight
- Conference: Southeast Conference

Ranking
- Coaches: No. 1
- AP: No. 1
- Record: 29–3 (14–0 SEC)
- Head coach: Adolph Rupp
- Assistant coach: Harry Lancaster
- Home arena: Memorial Coliseum

1951–52 Southeastern Conference men's basketball standings
	Conf.				Overall
Team	W		L	PCT	W		L	PCT
No. 1 Kentucky †	14	–	0	1.000	29	–	3	.906
LSU	9	–	5	.643	17	–	7	.708
Vanderbilt	9	–	5	.643	18	–	9	.667
Alabama	9	–	5	.643	13	–	9	.591
Ole Miss	8	–	6	.571	15	–	11	.577
Florida	7	–	7	.500	15	–	9	.625
Tennessee	7	–	7	.500	13	–	9	.591
Tulane	7	–	7	.500	12	–	12	.500
Auburn	6	–	8	.429	14	–	12	.538
Mississippi State	4	–	10	.286	12	–	11	.522
Georgia Tech	2	–	12	.143	7	–	15	.318
Georgia	2	–	12	.143	3	–	22	.120
† 1952 SEC Tournament winner Rankings from AP Poll

The 1951–52 Kentucky Wildcats men's basketball team represented University of Kentucky. The head coach was Adolph Rupp. The team was a member of the Southeast Conference and played their home games at Memorial Coliseum in Lexington, Kentucky. The Wildcats finished the season with a 29–3 (14–0 SEC) record.

== Roster ==
1951–52 Kentucky Wildcats men's basketball team
Players
Coaches

Pos.	#	Name	Height	Weight	Year	Previous school	Hometown
C	6	Cliff Hagan	6 ft 4 in (1.93 m)	200 lb (91 kg)	Jr	Owensboro	Owensboro, Kentucky
F	11	Shelby Linville	6 ft 5 in (1.96 m)	200 lb (91 kg)	Sr	Middletown	Middletown, Ohio
G	38	Bobby Watson (C)	5 ft 10 in (1.78 m)	155 lb (70 kg)	Sr	Owensboro	Owensboro, Kentucky
G	32	Lucian Whitaker	6 ft 0 in (1.83 m)	170 lb (77 kg)	Sr	Sarasota	Sarasota, Florida

Head coach

- Adolph Rupp (Kansas)

Assistant coach(es)

Legend

- (C) Team captain
- (S) Suspended
- (I) Ineligible
- (W) Walk-on
- Injured
- Current redshirt

== Schedule and results ==
Date time, TV	Rank^{#}	Opponent^{#}	Result	Record	Site city, state
Regular Season
Dec 8, 1951*		Washington and Lee	W 96–46	1–0	Memorial Coliseum; Lexington, Kentucky
Dec 10, 1951*	No. 1	at Xavier	W 97–72	2–0	Schmidt Fieldhouse; Cincinnati, Ohio
Dec 13, 1951*	No. 1	at Minnesota	L 57–61	2–1	Williams Arena; Minneapolis, Minnesota
Dec 17, 1951*	No. 2	No. 1 St. John's	W 81–40	3–1	Memorial Coliseum; Lexington, Kentucky
Dec 20, 1951*	No. 2	DePaul	W 98–60	4–1	Memorial Coliseum; Lexington, Kentucky
Dec 26, 1951*	No. 1	No. 16 UCLA	W 84–53	5–1	Memorial Coliseum; Lexington, Kentucky
Dec 28, 1951*	No. 1	vs. Brigham Young; Sugar Bowl Classic	W 84–64	6–1	Municipal Auditorium; New Orleans, Louisiana
Dec 29, 1951*	No. 1	vs. No. 12 Saint Louis; Sugar Bowl Classic	L 60–61	6–2	Municipal Auditorium; New Orleans, Louisiana
Jan 3, 1952	No. 4	vs. Ole Miss	W 116–58	7–2 (1–0)	Owensboro Sportscenter; Owensboro, Kentucky
Jan 5, 1952	No. 4	LSU	W 57–47	8–2 (2–0)	Memorial Coliseum; Lexington, Kentucky
Jan 7, 1952*	No. 4	Xavier	W 83–50	9–2	Memorial Coliseum; Lexington, Kentucky
Jan 12, 1952	No. 3	at Florida	W 99–52	10–2 (3–0)	Florida Gymnasium; Gainesville, Florida
Jan 14, 1952	No. 3	Georgia	W 95–55	11–2 (4–0)	Jefferson County Armory; Louisville, Kentucky
Jan 19, 1952	No. 3	at Tennessee	W 65–56	12–2 (5–0)	Alumni Memorial Gym; Knoxville, Tennessee
Jan 21, 1952	No. 3	at Georgia Tech	W 96–51	13–2 (6–0)	Heisman Gymnasium; Atlanta, Georgia
Jan 26, 1952	No. 3	at Alabama	W 71–67	14–2 (7–0)	Foster Auditorium; Tuscaloosa, Alabama
Jan 28, 1952	No. 3	at Vanderbilt	W 88–51	15–2 (8–0)	Old Gym; Nashville, Tennessee
Jan 30, 1952	No. 1	at Auburn	W 88–48	16–2 (8–0)	Auburn Sports Arena; Auburn, Alabama
Feb 2, 1952*	No. 1	vs. Notre Dame	W 71–66	17–2	Chicago Stadium; Chicago, Illinois
Feb 4, 1952	No. 1	Tulane	W 103–54	18–2 (9–0)	Memorial Coliseum; Lexington, Kentucky
Feb 6, 1952	No. 1	Ole Miss	W 81–61	19–2 (10–0)	Memorial Coliseum; Lexington, Kentucky
Feb 9, 1952	No. 1	Georgia Tech	W 93–42	20–2 (11–0)	Memorial Coliseum; Lexington, Kentucky
Feb 11, 1952	No. 1	Mississippi State	W 110–66	21–2 (12–0)	Memorial Coliseum; Lexington, Kentucky
Feb 16, 1952	No. 1	Tennessee	W 95–40	22–2 (13–0)	Memorial Coliseum; Lexington, Kentucky
Feb 21, 1952	No. 1	Vanderbilt	W 75–45	23–2 (14–0)	Memorial Coliseum; Lexington, Kentucky
Feb 23, 1952*	No. 1	at DePaul	W 63–61	24–2	Chicago Stadium; Chicago, Illinois
SEC Tournament
Feb 28, 1952*	(1) No. 1	vs. (12) Georgia Tech; First round	W 80–59	25–2	Jefferson County Armory; Louisville, Kentucky
Feb 29, 1952*	(1) No. 1	vs. (8) Tulane; Second Round	W 85–61	26–2	Jefferson County Armory; Louisville, Kentucky
Mar 1, 1952*	(1) No. 1	vs. (5) Tennessee; Semifinal	W 81–66	27–2	Jefferson County Armory; Louisville, Kentucky
Mar 1, 1952*	(1) No. 1	vs. (3) LSU; Championship Game	W 44–43	28–2	Jefferson County Armory; Louisville, Kentucky
NCAA Tournament
Mar 21, 1952*	No. 1	vs. Penn State; East Regional semifinal	W 82–54	29–2	Reynolds Coliseum; Raleigh, North Carolina
Mar 22, 1952*	No. 1	vs. No. 10 St. John's; East Regional Final	L 57–64	29–3	Reynolds Coliseum; Raleigh, North Carolina
*Non-conference game. ^{#}Rankings from AP Poll. (#) Tournament seedings in parentheses. E=East.

=== NCAA basketball tournament ===
- East
  - Kentucky 82, Penn State 54
  - St. John's, New York 64, Kentucky 57

== Awards and honors ==
- Cliff Hagan – Consensus First-team All-American

== Team players drafted into the NBA ==
Round	Overall	Player	NBA club
7	64	Skippy Whitaker	Indianapolis Olympians
