= Indiana Pacers =

National Basketball Association team in Indianapolis, Indiana

- 2026–27 Indiana Pacers season
- Conference: Eastern
- Division: Central
- Founded: 1967
- History: Indiana Pacers; 1967–1976 (ABA); 1976–present (NBA)
- Arena: Gainbridge Fieldhouse
- Location: Indianapolis, Indiana
- Team colors: Navy blue, gold, gray
- Main sponsor: Lucas Oil
- President: Kevin Pritchard
- General manager: Chad Buchanan
- Head coach: Rick Carlisle
- Ownership: Herb Simon
- Affiliation: Noblesville Boom
- Championships: 3 ABA: 3 (1970, 1972, 1973); NBA: 0
- Conference titles: 2 (2000, 2025)
- Division titles: 9 ABA: 3 (1969, 1970, 1971); NBA: 6 (1995, 1999, 2000, 2004, 2013, 2014)
- Retired numbers: 5 (30, 31, 34, 35, 529)
- Website: nba.com/pacers
Association	Icon	Statement

The Indiana Pacers are an American professional basketball team based in Indianapolis. The Pacers compete in the National Basketball Association (NBA) as a member of the Central Division of the Eastern Conference. The team was founded in 1967 as an original member of the American Basketball Association (ABA) and became a member of the NBA in 1976 as a result of the ABA–NBA merger. They play their home games at Gainbridge Fieldhouse. The team is named after the state of Indiana's history with the Indianapolis 500's pace cars and with the harness racing industry.

The Pacers have won three championships, in 1970, 1972, and 1973, all in the ABA. They also reached the ABA Finals in 1969 and 1975, and have also appeared in the NBA Finals in 2000 and 2025. The team has also won nine division titles.

Six Hall of Fame players – Reggie Miller, Chris Mullin, Alex English, Mel Daniels, Roger Brown, and George McGinnis – played with the Pacers for multiple seasons. The franchise has multiple Hall of Fame coaches in Bobby "Slick" Leonard, Jack Ramsay, and Larry Brown. Furthermore, former Pacers inducted into international Halls of Fame include Miller and Detlef Schrempf in the FIBA Hall of Fame.

== History ==
=== 1967–1976: ABA dynasty ===
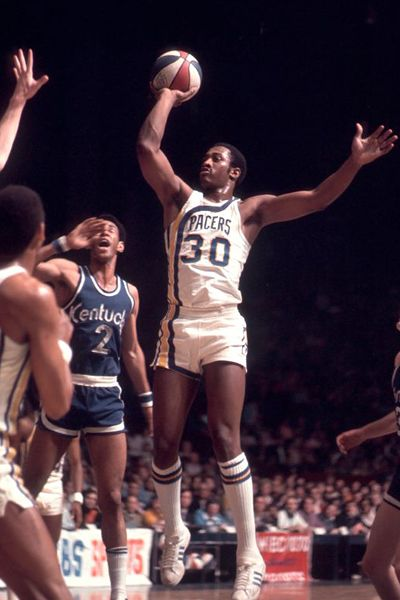
George McGinnis was an early standout for the Pacers during their time in the ABA

In early 1967, a group of six investors (attorney Richard Tinkham, John DeVoe, Chuck DeVoe, entrepreneur Lyn Treece, sports agent Chuck Barnes, and Indianapolis Star sports writer Bob Collins) pooled their resources to purchase a franchise in the proposed American Basketball Association.

For their first seven years, they played in the Indiana State Fairgrounds Coliseum, although they did play select playoff games in various places, such as Anderson High School Wigwam for four playoff games (1969, 1971, 1972). and even Assembly Hall for two playoff games (1972). In 1974, they moved to the new Market Square Arena in downtown Indianapolis, where they played for 25 years.

Early in the Pacers' second season, former Indiana Hoosiers standout Bob "Slick" Leonard became the team's head coach, replacing Larry Staverman. Leonard quickly turned the Pacers into a juggernaut. His teams were buoyed by the great play of superstars such as Mel Daniels, George McGinnis, Bob Netolicky, Rick Mount, Freddie Lewis and Roger Brown. The Pacers were the most successful team in ABA history, winning three ABA Championships in four years. In all, they appeared in the ABA Finals five times in the league's nine-year history, which was an ABA record.

=== 1976–1987: Early NBA struggles ===
The Pacers were one of four ABA teams that joined the NBA in the ABA–NBA merger in the 1976–77 season, along with the Denver Nuggets, New York Nets, and San Antonio Spurs.

The league charged a $3.2 million entry fee for each former ABA team. Since the NBA would only agree to accept four ABA teams in the merger, the surviving ABA teams also had to compensate the two remaining ABA franchises which were not a part of the merger, the Spirits of St. Louis and Kentucky Colonels (a third ABA team, the Virginia Squires, would fold operations before the merger talks began). As a result of the merger, the four teams dealt with financial troubles. Additionally, the Pacers had some financial troubles, which dated back to their waning days in the ABA; they had begun selling off some of their star players in the last ABA season. The new NBA teams also were barred from sharing in national TV revenues for four years.

The Pacers finished their inaugural NBA season with a record of 36–46. Billy Knight and Don Buse represented Indiana in the NBA All-Star Game. However, this was one of the few bright spots of the Pacers' first 13 years in the NBA. During this time, they had only two non-losing seasons and only two playoff appearances.

A lack of continuity became the norm for most of the next decade, as they traded away Knight and Buse before the 1977–78 season even started. They acquired Adrian Dantley in exchange for Knight, but Dantley (who was averaging nearly 27 points per game at the time) was traded in December, while the Pacers' second-leading scorer, John Williamson, was dealt in January.

The early Pacers came out on the short end of two of the most one-sided trades in NBA history. In 1980, they traded Alex English to the Nuggets to reacquire former ABA star George McGinnis. McGinnis was long past his prime and contributed very little during his two-year return. English, in contrast, went on to become one of the greatest scorers in NBA history. The next year, they traded a 1984 draft pick to the Portland Trail Blazers for center Tom Owens, who had played for the Pacers during their last ABA season. Owens played one year for the Pacers with little impact and was out of the league altogether a year later. In 1983–84, the Pacers finished with the worst record in the Eastern Conference, which would have given the Pacers the second overall pick in the draft – the pick that the Blazers used to select Sam Bowie, while Michael Jordan was still available. As a result of the Owens trade, they were left as bystanders in the midst of one of the deepest drafts in NBA history – including such future stars as Jordan, Hakeem Olajuwon, Sam Perkins, Charles Barkley, and John Stockton.

Clark Kellogg was drafted by the Pacers in the 1982 and finished second in the Rookie of the Year voting, but the Pacers finished the 1982–83 season with their all-time worst record of 20–62 and won only 26 games the following season. After winning 22 games in 1984–85 and 26 games in 1985–86, Jack Ramsay replaced George Irvine as coach and led the Pacers to a 41–41 record in 1986–87 and their second playoff appearance as an NBA team. Chuck Person, nicknamed "The Rifleman" for his renowned long-range shooting, led the team in scoring as a rookie and won NBA Rookie of the Year honors. Their first playoff win in NBA franchise history was earned in game 3 of their first-round, best-of-five series against the Atlanta Hawks, but it was their only victory in that series, as the Hawks defeated them in four games.

=== 1987–2005: The Reggie Miller era ===
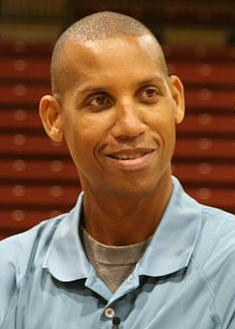
Reggie Miller played his entire 18-year Hall of Fame career with the Pacers.

Reggie Miller from UCLA was drafted by the Pacers in 1987, beginning his career as a backup to John Long. Many fans at the time disagreed with Miller's selection over Indiana Hoosiers' standout Steve Alford. The Pacers missed the playoffs in 1987–88, drafted Rik Smits in the 1988 NBA draft, and suffered through a disastrous 1988–89 season in which coach Jack Ramsay stepped down following an 0–7 start. Mel Daniels and George Irvine filled in on an interim basis before Dick Versace took over the 6–23 team on the way to a 28–54 finish. In February 1989, the team traded veteran center Herb Williams to the Dallas Mavericks for future NBA Sixth Man-of-the Year Detlef Schrempf.

From 1989 to 1993, the Pacers would play at or near .500 and qualify for the playoffs; in 1989–90, the Pacers parlayed a fast start into the team's third playoff appearance under coach Bob Hill. But the Pacers were swept by the Detroit Pistons, who would go on to win their second consecutive NBA championship. Reggie Miller became the first Pacer to play in the All-Star Game since 1976 on the strength of his 24.6 points-per-game average. Despite four straight first-round exits, this period was highlighted by a first-round series with the Boston Celtics in the 1991 playoffs that went to game 5. The next season, the Pacers returned to the playoffs in 1992 and met the Boston Celtics for the second year in a row. This time, the Celtics swept the Pacers in three games. Chuck Person and point guard Micheal Williams were traded to the Minnesota Timberwolves in the off-season, and the Pacers got Pooh Richardson and Sam Mitchell in return. For the 1992–93 season, Detlef Schrempf moved from sixth man to the starter at small forward and was elected to his first All-Star game. Meanwhile, Miller became the Pacers' all-time NBA era leading scorer during this season (fourth overall). The Pacers returned to the playoffs with a 41–41 record, but lost to the New York Knicks in the first round, three games to one.

==== 1994–1997: Larry Brown era ====
Larry Brown was brought aboard as Pacers' coach for the 1993–94 season, and Pacers' general manager Donnie Walsh completed a then highly criticized trade as he sent Schrempf to the Seattle SuperSonics in exchange for Derrick McKey and little known Gerald Paddio. But the Pacers won their last eight games of the season to finish with an NBA-era franchise-high 47 wins. They stormed past Shaquille O'Neal and the Orlando Magic in a first-round sweep to earn their first NBA playoff series win, and pulled off an upset by defeating the top-seeded Atlanta Hawks in the conference semifinals.

===== Back-to-back Eastern Conference finals appearances =====
With the 1994 Eastern Conference finals tied going into game 5 in New York, and the Pacers trailing the Knicks by 15 points early in the fourth quarter, Reggie Miller scored 25 points, which included five 3-point field goals. Miller also flashed the choke sign to the Knicks' celebrity fan, Spike Lee, while leading the Pacers to the come from behind victory. The Knicks ultimately came back to win the next two games and the series. Miller was a tri-captain and leading scorer of the USA Basketball team that won the gold medal at the 1994 FIBA World Championship.

Mark Jackson joined the team in an off-season trade with the Los Angeles Clippers, giving the team a steady hand at the point guard position that had been lacking in recent years. The Pacers enjoyed a 52–30 campaign in 1994–95, giving them their first Central Division title and first 50+ win season since the ABA days. The team swept the Hawks in the first round of the 1995 NBA playoffs, before another meeting with the rival Knicks in the conference semifinals. This time, with the Pacers down six points with 16.4 seconds remaining in game 1, Miller scored eight points in 8.9 seconds to help secure a two-point victory. The Pacers beat the Knicks in seven games. They pushed the Orlando Magic to seven games before falling in the Eastern Conference finals.

===== Injury-plagued seasons =====
The Pacers duplicated their 52–30 record in 1995–96, but were hurt severely by an injury to Reggie Miller's eye socket in April, from which he was not able to return until game 5 of their first-round series against the Hawks. Miller scored 29 points in that game, but the Hawks came away with a two-point victory to put an early end to Indiana's season. This 1995–96 Pacers did manage to go down in history as the only team to defeat the Chicago Bulls twice that year, a Bulls team which made history with a then all-time best 72–10 record. The Pacers could not withstand several key injuries in 1996–97, nor could they handle the absence of Mark Jackson, who had been traded to the Denver Nuggets before the season (though they did re-acquire Jackson at the trading deadline). The Pacers finished 39–43 and missed the playoffs for the first time since 1989, after which coach Larry Brown stepped down.

==== 1997–2000: Larry Bird era ====
In the 1997–98 NBA season, Indiana native and former Boston Celtics great Larry Bird was hired as head coach. He led the Pacers to a 19-game improvement over the previous season, finishing 58–24 at the time, the most the franchise had ever won as an NBA team, and tying the 1970–71 ABA Pacers for the franchise record.

===== Back-to-back Eastern Conference finals appearances =====
Chris Mullin joined the team in the off-season and immediately became a valuable part of the Pacers lineup as the starting small forward. Assistant coaches Rick Carlisle, in charge of the offense, and Dick Harter, who coached the defense, were key in getting the most out of the Pacers' role players such as Dale Davis, Derrick McKey, and a young Antonio Davis. Miller and Rik Smits both made the All-Star team that year, and in the playoffs, the Pacers breezed past the Cleveland Cavaliers and New York Knicks before falling to the Chicago Bulls in a seven-game Eastern Conference finals.

In the lockout-shortened 1998–99 season, the Pacers won the Central Division with a 33–17 record and swept the Milwaukee Bucks and Philadelphia 76ers before falling to the Knicks in a six-game Eastern Conference finals.

===== 2000 NBA Finals appearance =====
Prior to the 1999–2000 NBA season, the Pacers traded forward Antonio Davis to the Toronto Raptors in exchange for first-round draft choice Jonathan Bender. In the 2000 NBA playoffs, after a 56–26 regular season, the Pacers survived the upset-minded Milwaukee Bucks in the first round, handled the Philadelphia 76ers in the second round and finally broke through to the NBA Finals by virtue of a six-game conference finals victory over the New York Knicks. Their first NBA Finals appearance was against the Los Angeles Lakers, who ended Indiana's championship hopes in six games. However, the Pacers dealt Los Angeles their worst playoff defeat up to that time by a margin of 33 points in game five.

==== 2000–2003: Isiah Thomas era ====
The off-season brought sweeping changes to the Pacers' lineup, as Rik Smits and coach Larry Bird retired, Chris Mullin returned to the Golden State Warriors, Mark Jackson signed a long-term contract with Toronto, and Dale Davis was traded to Portland for Jermaine O'Neal, who went on to average 12.9 points per game in his first year as a starter. It was a rebuilding year for the Pacers under the new head coach Isiah Thomas. However, the team still managed to return to the playoffs, where they lost to the top-seeded Philadelphia 76ers in four games.

===== Jermaine O'Neal's rise to stardom =====
In the midseason of 2001–02, the Pacers made a blockbuster trade with the Chicago Bulls that sent Jalen Rose and Travis Best to Chicago in exchange for Brad Miller, Ron Artest, Kevin Ollie and Ron Mercer. In the next few years, Miller and Artest would go on to be All-Stars for the Pacers. The trade bolstered a team that had been floundering, and the Pacers managed to return to the playoffs, where they pushed the top-seeded New Jersey Nets to five games before losing game 5 in double overtime. Jermaine O'Neal made his first of what would be several All-Star appearances in his Pacers career.

The Pacers got off to a 13–2 start in 2002–03 but hit the wall after the All-Star break thanks in no small part to Ron Artest's multiple suspensions and family tragedies befalling Jermaine O'Neal, Jamaal Tinsley and Austin Croshere. O'Neal and Brad Miller both made the All-Star team, and the Pacers made a substantial improvement as they finished 48–34, but they suffered a loss to the underdog Boston Celtics in the first round of the playoffs.

==== 2003–2007: Rick Carlisle era ====
In the 2003 off-season, the Pacers managed to re-sign O'Neal for the NBA maximum and inked Reggie Miller to a modest two-year deal, but they could not afford to keep their talented center, Brad Miller. He was dealt to the Sacramento Kings in exchange for Scot Pollard, who spent much of the following year watching from the bench and backing up Jeff Foster. The Pacers also signed Larry Bird as team president, and Bird wasted little time in dismissing coach Isiah Thomas and replacing him with Rick Carlisle.

===== Ron Artest's rise to stardom =====
The Pacers responded to Carlisle extremely well and had a breakthrough 2003–04 season in which they finished 61–21, earning the best record in the NBA as well as a franchise record. O'Neal and Artest made the All-Star team, and Artest was named the NBA's Defensive Player of the Year; the Pacers swept the Boston Celtics in the first round and squeezed by the Miami Heat in the conference semifinals. But the Detroit Pistons proved an impediment to Indiana's championship aspirations, as they defeated the Pacers in six games on their way to the NBA Championship.

===== Miller's final season and Malice at the Palace =====
Al Harrington, a small forward who had established himself as one of the best sixth-men in the NBA, was dealt in the off-season to the Atlanta Hawks in return for Stephen Jackson after Harrington allegedly demanded that the Pacers start him or trade him. Nevertheless, the Pacers started the 2004–05 season strongly until a November 19, 2004 game. Toward the end of a Pacers victory over the Detroit Pistons at The Palace of Auburn Hills, the Pacers' Ron Artest committed a hard foul against Ben Wallace. Wallace retaliated with a hard push, threw a towel at Artest, and the situation escalated to a full-scale brawl, with fans and several Pacers taking part. While Artest lay atop the scorer's table trying to calm down and do an interview, Pistons fan John Green (who was sitting next to Wallace's brother) threw a cup of Diet Coke at Artest, causing him to charge into the stands. Stephen Jackson followed him into the stands while Jermaine O'Neal struck a fan who came onto the court. The game was called off with 45.9 seconds left on the clock, and the Pacers left the floor amid a shower of beer and other beverages that rained down from the stands.

Several of the involved players were suspended by NBA Commissioner David Stern. Artest was suspended for the rest of the regular season and playoffs, a total of 73 games – the longest suspension for an on-court incident in NBA history. Other suspensions included Jackson (suspended for 30 games), O'Neal (25 games), Wallace (6 games), and the Pacers' Anthony Johnson (5 games) (O'Neal's suspension was later reduced to 15 games by arbitrator Roger Kaplan, a decision that was upheld by U. S. District Judge George B. Daniels). O'Neal was charged with two counts of assault and battery, while Artest, Jackson, Johnson, and David Harrison were charged with one count each.

After the brawl and suspensions that followed, the Pacers fell into the Central Division. They went from a legitimate title contender to a team that hovered around .500 in winning percentage. The Pistons eventually became the Central Division champions. Despite the difficulties with the suspensions and injuries, the Pacers earned a sixth seed in the playoffs with a record of 44–38. An important reason for their strong finish was the re-acquisition of Dale Davis, who had been released by the New Orleans Hornets after being traded there by the Golden State Warriors. He played the final 25 games of the regular season and every playoff game, contributing a strong presence at center. And Davis' signing coincided with an injury to Jermaine O'Neal that would knock him out for virtually the remainder of the regular season.

Despite the adversity they had gone through, the Pacers made the playoffs for the 13th time in 14 years. In the first round, Indiana defeated the Atlantic Division champion Boston Celtics, winning game 7 in Boston with a score of 97–70, just the third time the Celtics had dropped a game 7 at home. The Pacers then advanced to the second round against the Detroit Pistons, in a rematch of the previous year's Eastern Conference finals. The series featured games back at The Palace of Auburn Hills, the scene of the brawl that many assumed at the time had effectively ended the Pacers' season. After losing game 1, the Pacers won the next two games to take a 2–1 lead. However, the Pacers could not repeat their victories against the Pistons and lost the next three games, losing the series 4–2. The final game (game 6) was on May 19, 2005; Reggie Miller, in his final NBA game, scored 27 points and received a standing ovation from the crowd. Despite Miller's effort, the Pacers lost, sending Miller into retirement without an NBA Championship in his 18-year career, all with the Pacers. Miller had his No. 31 jersey retired by the Pacers on March 30, 2006, when the Pacers played the Phoenix Suns.

=== 2005–2012: The Danny Granger era ===
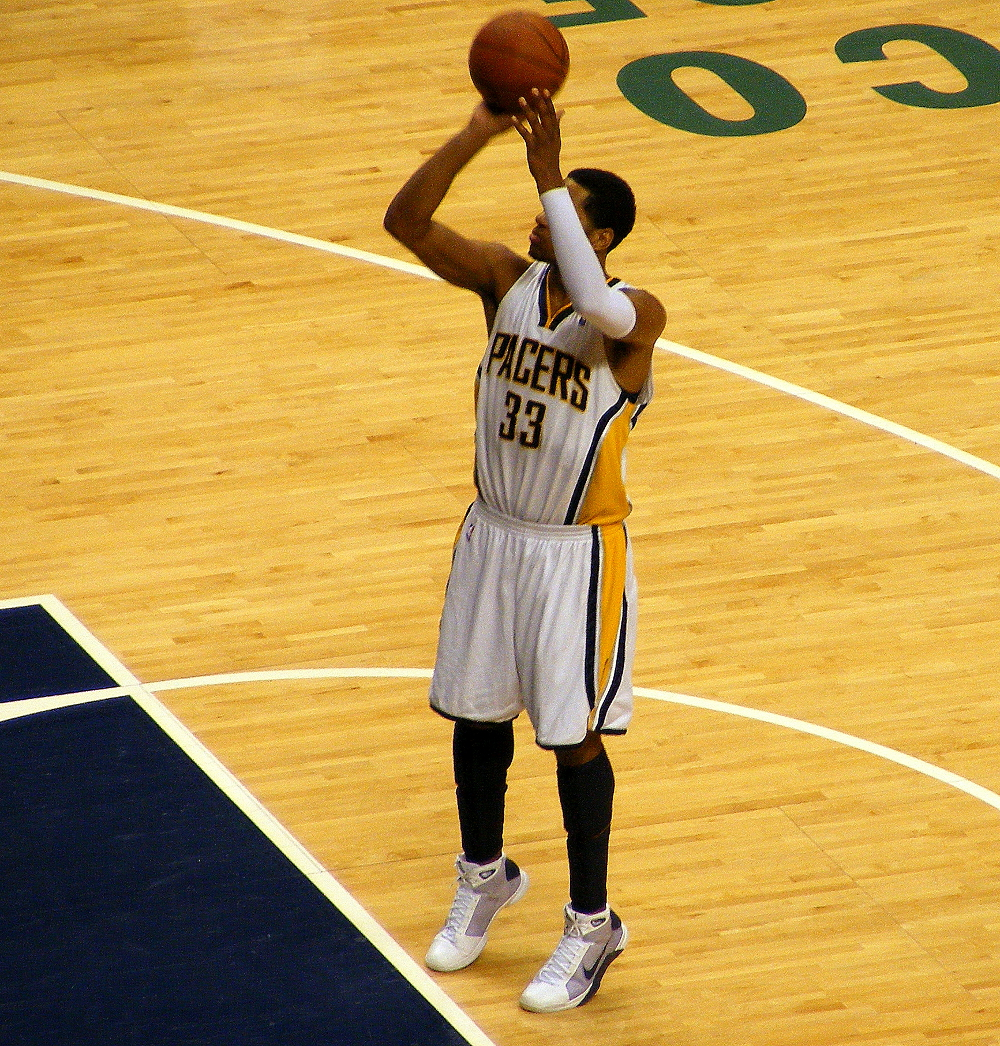
Danny Granger led the team in scoring for five consecutive seasons

The team went on to draft Danny Granger 17th overall in the 2005 NBA draft. During the 2005–06 season, the Pacers traded Ron Artest to the Sacramento Kings in exchange for Peja Stojaković. Despite the loss of Reggie Miller, the Artest saga, and many key injuries, the Pacers made the playoffs in 2006 for the 14th time in 15 years. They also were the only road team to win game 1 of a first-round playoff series. However, New Jersey won game 2 to tie the series at 1–1, heading back to Indiana. In game 3, Jermaine O'Neal scored 37 points, as the Pacers regained a 2–1 series lead. The Nets, however, won games four and five to take a 3–2 series lead. In game 6, Anthony Johnson scored 40 points, but the Pacers' season came to an end as the Nets won 96–90.

The Pacers finished the 2006–07 season as one of the worst seasons in team history. The turning point of the season would be an 11-game losing streak that started around the all-star break. Injuries to Jermaine O'Neal and Marquis Daniels, a lack of a solid backup point guard, the blockbuster trade midway through the season that interrupted the team chemistry, poor defensive efforts, and being the NBA's worst offensive team were the main reasons leading to the team's struggles. The April 15 loss to New Jersey Nets knocked the Pacers out of the playoffs for the first time since the 1996–97 season.

==== 2007–2010: O'Neal's final season and rebuilding years ====
On April 10, 2007, the Pacers announced that coach Rick Carlisle had been fired, with the Pacers' first losing record in ten seasons being the main reason for the coach's dismissal. Pacers President Larry Bird noted that Carlisle had the opportunity to return to the Pacers franchise in another role. Later, Carlisle opted to leave and took a broadcasting job with ESPN before returning to coach the Dallas Mavericks in 2008 (where he would win a championship in 2011). On May 31, 2007, Jim O'Brien was named Carlisle's successor. O'Brien made it clear that he intended to take the Pacers back to the playoffs in the 2007–08 season, but he did not in his tenure. He also made it known that he favored a more up-tempo, fast-paced style as opposed to Carlisle's slower, more meticulous style of coaching. Many people have taken note that this style, while exciting at times, failed to produce a winning record, and O'Brien's inability to change his style to better suit his talent available has hurt the team.

Despite missing the playoffs in back-to-back seasons for the first time since the 1980s, the 2007–08 season displayed many signs of growth in the team, especially towards the end of the season. Off-court legal distraction from Jamaal Tinsley, Marquis Daniels, and Shawne Williams in the middle of the season did not help the Pacers struggles, and injuries to Tinsley and Jermaine O'Neal damaged the Pacers' already weak defense and left almost all point guard duties to recently acquired Travis Diener, who saw minimal minutes on his previous NBA teams. Despite this, and a 36–46 record, the Pacers had a very strong finish to the season, which included a desperate attempt to steal the eighth seed from the Atlanta Hawks, and dramatic improvement in forwards Danny Granger and Mike Dunleavy. Both Granger and Dunleavy were involved in the voting for Most Improved Player, with Dunleavy finishing in the top 10. The two were also the first Pacers players to score 1500 points each in a single season since Reggie Miller and Detlef Schrempf did it in the early 1990s.

In April of the 2007–08 season, Donnie Walsh, Pacers Sports & Entertainment CEO & President, left the Indiana Pacers to join the New York Knicks. All of Walsh's basketball-related duties were given to Pacers' President of Basketball Operations Larry Bird. Walsh's business-related roles were given to co-owner Herb Simon and Jim Morris, who was promoted to President of Pacers Sports & Entertainment.

During the 2009 off-season, the Pacers traded declining Jermaine O'Neal along with Nathan Jawai to the Toronto Raptors in exchange for Roy Hibbert, T. J. Ford, Rasho Nesterović and Maceo Baston. Hibbert would go on to be a two-time all–star for the Pacers and was known as a defensive force with his shot-blocking abilities.

During the 2009–10 season, Pacers forward Tyler Hansbrough (drafted in 2009) suffered a season-ending ear injury, and without center Jeff Foster, the Pacers again fell into another season under .500 and missed the playoffs for four years in a row. Despite another disappointing season, the Pacers managed to sweep the waning Detroit Pistons for the first time in five years, and the abysmal New Jersey Nets. The team showed signs of life near the end of the season, winning nearly all of their last 14 games.

In May 2010, after completing his rookie season, guard A. J. Price suffered a knee injury during a charity pick-up game that would require surgery. His expected rehabilitation was to last between four and six months, to be back just in time for training camp.

==== 2010–2012: The arrival of Paul George and Danny Granger's final years ====
In the 2010 NBA draft, the Pacers selected forward/guard Paul George with the 10th overall pick. In the second round, they drafted guard Lance Stephenson, as well as forward Ryan Reid. The draft rights to Reid were traded on draft night to the Oklahoma City Thunder in exchange for the rights to forward/center Magnum Rolle. The Pacers signed George to his rookie contract on July 1, 2010. Stephenson signed a multi-year contract with the team on July 22. Just before training camp, Rolle was signed, along with big man Lance Allred. Both were cut before the regular season began.

On August 11, 2010, the Pacers acquired guard Darren Collison and swingman James Posey from the New Orleans Hornets in a four-team, five-player deal. Troy Murphy was dealt to the New Jersey Nets in that trade.

In the 2010–11 season, the team went 2–3 in the first five games. On November 9, in a home game against Denver, the team scored 54 points in the third quarter alone, shooting 20–21 in the process, on the way to a 144–113 rout of the Nuggets. Led by Mike Dunleavy's 24 points in the period, the team set a franchise record for most points in a quarter and was only four points short of the all-time NBA record for points in a quarter (58) set in the 1970s.

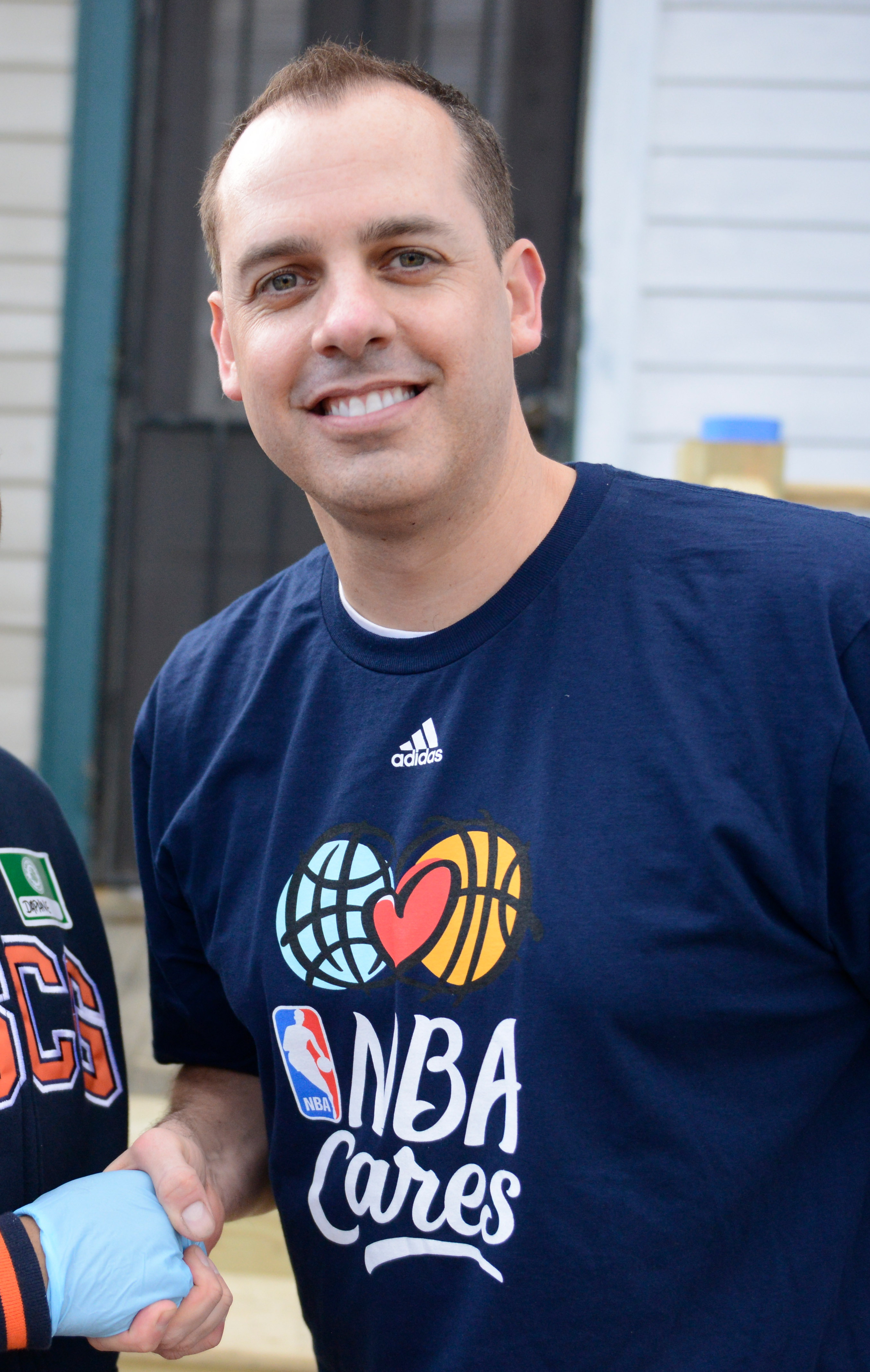
Frank Vogel was the Pacers' head coach from 2011 to 2016

On January 30, 2011, the Pacers relieved Jim O'Brien of his coaching duties and named assistant coach Frank Vogel interim head coach.

With a victory over the Washington Wizards on April 6, 2011, the Pacers clinched their first playoff berth since 2006. In the first round, they were defeated by the first seed Chicago Bulls in five games. Despite a lopsided comparison in terms of the two teams' win-loss records, three of the four Pacers' losses were close, losing games 1–3 by an average of five points.

The Pacers named Vogel their permanent head coach on July 7, 2011. They acquired George Hill from the San Antonio Spurs on draft night. After the lockout, and losing Mike Dunleavy Jr. to free agency, the Pacers signed former two-time All-Star power forward David West to a two-year deal. These new players contributed to the Pacers' record of 21–12 at the All-Star break. The Pacers acquired another key piece in Leandro Barbosa from the Toronto Raptors at the trade deadline, mid-season.

At the end of the 2011–12 season, the team, led in scoring by Danny Granger, clinched the playoffs as the third seed in the Eastern Conference. They finished with a 42–24 record, their best record since their 2003–04 season. On May 8, 2012, the Pacers defeated the Orlando Magic 105–87 to win their first playoff series since 2005 and would go on to play the Miami Heat in the Eastern Conference semifinals. On May 15, 2012, they defeated Miami to tie the second-round series at 1–1. On May 17, they again beat Miami 94–75 to take the series lead 2–1. However, despite a hard-fought series between the two, the Heat won game 6 to close the series at 4–2.

The following season, Granger was sidelined by a knee injury and managed only to play five games. Granger made his return during the 2013–14 season; however, he failed to regain his form of the previous seasons. Granger was then traded to the Philadelphia 76ers for wing Evan Turner and forward Lavoy Allen in a swap that took place approximately 30 minutes before the trade deadline.

=== 2012–2017: The Paul George era ===
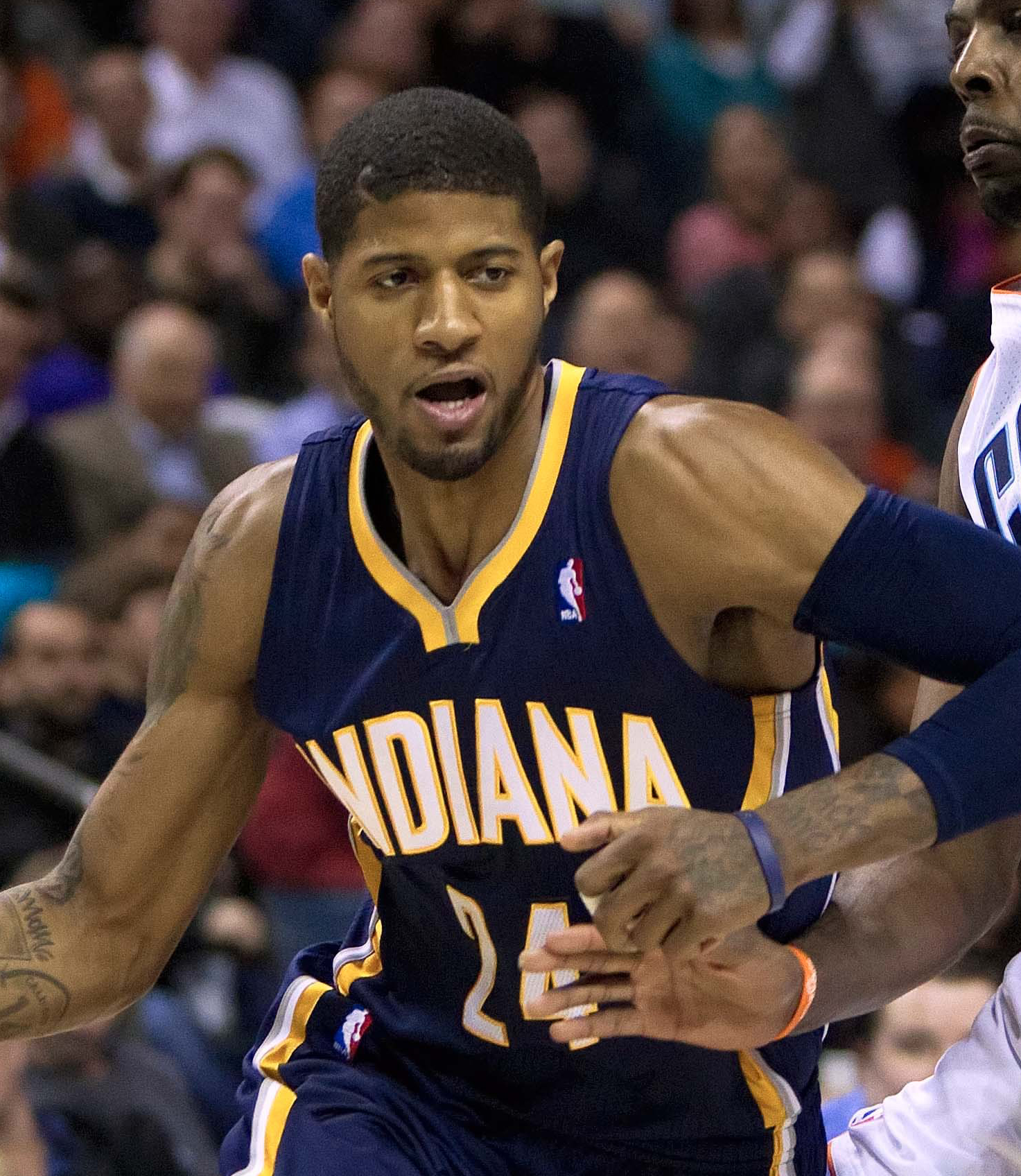
Paul George with the Pacers in 2014

==== 2012–2014: Championship aspirations ====
On June 26, 2012, general manager David Morway officially resigned. The following day, president of basketball operations, Larry Bird stepped down. Bird and Morway were officially replaced by Donnie Walsh and Kevin Pritchard, respectively. Walsh returned to the organization after spending the previous three seasons in the Knicks' front office. Pritchard was promoted by the Pacers after serving as the team's director of player personnel. In the 2012 NBA draft, the Pacers selected Miles Plumlee with the 26th pick and acquired Orlando Johnson, the 36th pick from the Sacramento Kings. The team also acquired key bench players Ian Mahinmi, Gerald Green, and D. J. Augustin.

On April 7, 2013, the Pacers clinched their first Central Division championship since the 2003–04 season. They finished the 2012–13 season with a 49–32 record, the third seed in the Eastern Conference, and beat the Atlanta Hawks in the first round of the playoffs. The Pacers then beat the New York Knicks in six games to advance to the Eastern Conference finals for the first time since 2004 to face the defending champs, the Miami Heat. The Pacers lost game 1 of the Eastern Conference finals on May 22, 2013, in overtime 103–102. On May 24, 2013, in game 2 of the Eastern Conference finals, the Pacers were victorious by a score of 97–93. The game was clinched for Indiana after David West deflected a pass from LeBron James. The team headed home to Indianapolis, where they had been a perfect 6–0 in the playoffs. The Heat won game 3 in Indianapolis on May 26, 2013, with contributions from role players Udonis Haslem and Chris Andersen, and won 114–96. The Pacers bounced back in game 4 with a strong contribution from Lance Stephenson and won 99–92. The Pacers lost game 5 in Miami on May 30 but won game 6 at home on June 1, extending the series to game 7. The Pacers were defeated by Miami 99–76.

One year after stepping down, Larry Bird returned as president of basketball operations. Donnie Walsh, who was brought back to hold the position for Bird, was named a consultant for the Pacers. In the 2013 NBA draft, the Pacers selected Solomon Hill with the 23rd overall pick. During the 2013 off-season, the Pacers made strengthening their bench a priority, resulting in the acquisitions of point guard C. J. Watson, and forwards Chris Copeland and Luis Scola, the latter being acquired via trade with the Phoenix Suns.

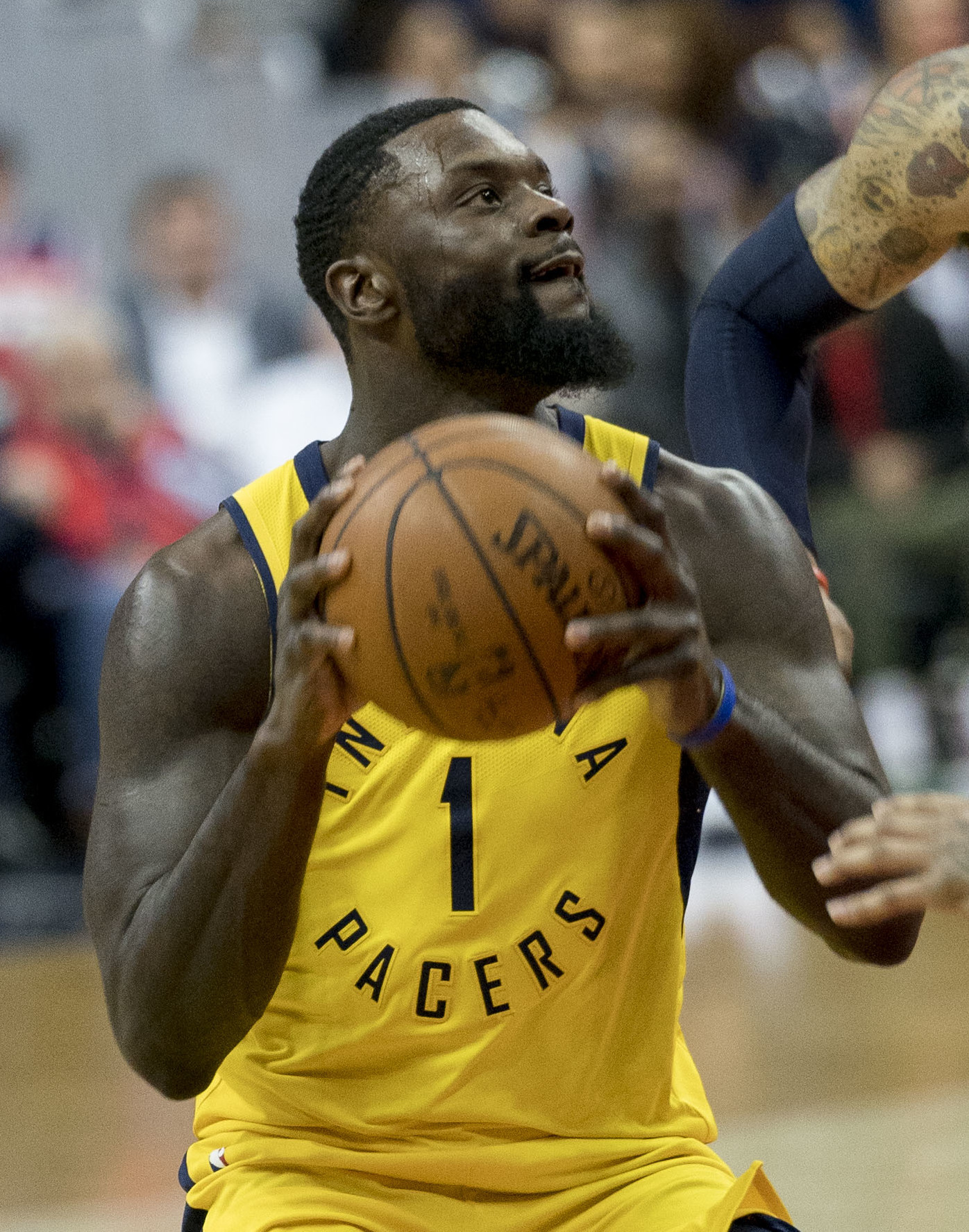
Lance Stephenson in 2018

The 2013–14 season saw the Pacers jump to an explosive first half of a season, as they started the season 33–7 thanks to the rise of Paul George and Lance Stephenson. On January 14, 2014, Vogel was named the Eastern Conference head coach for 2014 NBA All-Star Game. Paul George and Roy Hibbert were selected for the All-Star Game. The Pacers signed two-time NBA champion and 2012 All-Star Andrew Bynum for the remainder of the season. However, after the All-Star Break, the Pacers collapsed. After starting the season 40–11, the Pacers crashed and stumbled to a 16–15 finish, with rumors of fighting in the locker room being a potential cause for the meltdown. Regardless, they managed to hold onto their first seed in the East, finished the season with a 56–26 record.

The Pacers started off the playoffs against the Atlanta Hawks, defeating them in seven games. The Pacers then defeated Washington in six games in the semifinals, then a rematch with the second-seeded and defending champion Miami in the Eastern Conference finals. The Pacers surprised many critics, taking game 1 in the Eastern Conference finals with a score of 107–95. Unfortunately for the Pacers, they ended up losing the next three to the Heat before managing to avoid elimination in game 5 with a close win over the Heat. The game was notable for the infamous incident where Lance Stephenson blew into LeBron James' ear. Despite the win, the Pacers were eliminated in game 6 by the Miami Heat for the third straight year.

==== 2014–2017: George's injury and final seasons ====
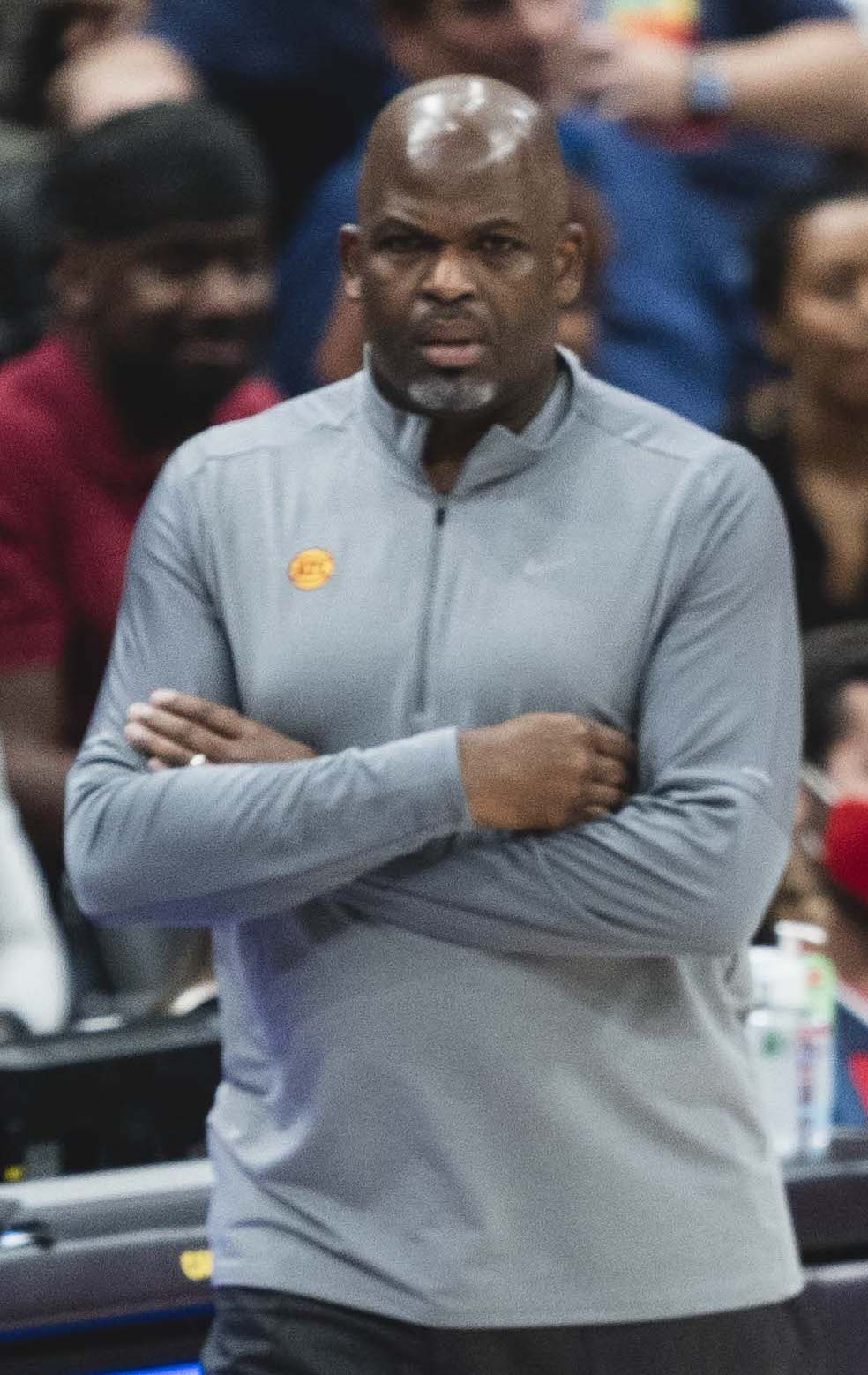
Nate McMillan, Pacers coach from 2016 until 2020.

On August 1, 2014, Paul George, who was playing in a Team USA scrimmage in preparation for the FIBA World Cup, suffered a catastrophic open fracture to his right leg (tibia and fibula) while trying to defend James Harden on a fast break. As he tried to defend Harden from advancing to the rim, George's leg caught on the stanchion of the hoop and fractured. He was stretchered off of the court. A day later, George successfully underwent surgery. He was expected to miss the entire 2014–15 season. On April 5, 2015, Paul George returned from his injury to play in a game against the Miami Heat. George shot 5-of-12 from the field and tallied two steals, two rebounds, and two assists in a winning effort. He played for fifteen minutes. After failing to reach the 2015 NBA Playoffs, the team departed with core players Roy Hibbert, David West, and Luis Scola. In the 2015 NBA draft, the Pacers selected Myles Turner 11th overall.

During the off-season, the Pacers signed star Monta Ellis as well as role player Jordan Hill, while acquiring Ty Lawson during the season. Paul George fully recovered from his injury and made the 2016 NBA All-Star Game as a starter. The Pacers would go on to lose game 7 in the first round against the Toronto Raptors ending their 2015–16 season. Despite the Pacers going 45–37 and making the playoffs, on May 5, 2016, Pacers' president Larry Bird announced that head coach Frank Vogel's contract would not be renewed, citing a need for "a new voice" to lead the players. Later that month former Seattle SuperSonics and Portland Trail Blazers head coach Nate McMillan was promoted to replace Vogel.

The team made several off-season moves, acquiring new starters Jeff Teague and Thaddeus Young, as well as key bench players Al Jefferson and Aaron Brooks. During the season, the Pacers waived Rodney Stuckey in order to sign former fan-favorite Lance Stephenson. The Pacers qualified to play in the 2017 NBA Playoffs with a 42–40 record, which earned them the seventh seed in the Eastern Conference. However, they were given a quick exit by the defending champions, the Cleveland Cavaliers, who swept them in four games.

=== 2017–2021: The Oladipo and Sabonis era ===
On June 30, 2017, Paul George was traded to the Oklahoma City Thunder for Victor Oladipo and Domantas Sabonis. The Pacers received heavy criticism for this trade, but it would eventually prove to be the best season of Oladipo's career, with him showing an increase in points, steals, assists, rebounds, free throw percentage, field goal percentage, and three-point percentage, which resulted to winning the NBA Most Improved Player Award. Sabonis also showed an increase in points, rebounds, and assists while leading the Pacers in rebounding during the 2017–18 season. Oladipo would be selected as a 2018 NBA All-Star reserve, while Sabonis was selected to represent Team World in the Rising Stars Challenge. Oladipo ended the season leading the NBA in steals per game. The team welcomed back former Pacer Darren Collison as well as newcomers Bojan Bogdanović and Cory Joseph. The Pacers ended the season with a 48–34 record, which earned them the fifth seed in the Eastern Conference. Their record was a six–game improvement from last season with Paul George. The Pacers faced the Cleveland Cavaliers in the first round of the 2018 NBA playoffs for the second year in a row. After taking a 2–1 series lead, the Pacers fell to the Cavaliers in seven games.

The 2018–19 season welcomed new players Tyreke Evans, Wesley Matthews, and Doug McDermott. Oladipo would be selected as an All-Star reserve again for the 2019 game. However, while playing against the Toronto Raptors on January 23, 2019, he left the game with a ruptured quad tendon, and he was ruled out for the rest of the season. Regardless, the Pacers again finished the season going 48–34 and secured a playoff spot for the fourth consecutive time on March 22, but were swept in the first round of the 2019 playoffs by the Boston Celtics.

After an active 2019 off-season, the Pacers fielded four new starters on opening night. Holdover Myles Turner was joined by reserve–turned–starter Domantas Sabonis, as well as new acquisitions Malcolm Brogdon, T. J. Warren, and Jeremy Lamb, who was slated to become a top reserve once all-star guard Victor Oladipo returned from injury. The Pacers also signed reserves T. J. McConnell and Justin Holiday, with Holiday joining his younger brother Aaron Holiday on the team. The Pacers also saw three players with the name "T. J." take the court in McConnell, Warren, and Leaf. in Following an 0–3 start to the season, the Pacers held a 26–15 record halfway through the season, ranking them fifth place in the Eastern Conference. Domantas Sabonis averaged a careerbest 18.5 points, 12.4 rebounds, and 5 assists a game. Subsequently, Sabonis was named an NBA All-Star for the first time in his career. Unfortunately, his season was cut short due to a foot injury and would miss the postseason.

Following the suspension of the 2019–20 NBA season, the Pacers were one of the 22 teams invited to the NBA Bubble to participate in the final eight games of the regular season. The Pacers would finish the 2019–20 regular season with a record of 45–28 and headed into the playoffs as the fourth seed in the Eastern Conference. On August 12, 2020, the team announced that they had extended Nate McMillan's contract. They then matched up with the fifth seeded Miami Heat where they would go on to lose the first-round series 4–0 which subsequently ended their 2019–20 season.

Following the loss to the Heat, the Pacers parted ways with head coach Nate McMillan, despite the recent extension. On October 20, 2020, it was announced that former Toronto Raptors assistant coach, Nate Bjorkgren, had signed a multi-year deal to become the next head coach. On January 16, 2021, Victor Oladipo was traded to the Houston Rockets as a part of a four-team deal that sent James Harden to the Brooklyn Nets and Caris LeVert to Indiana. Sabonis would go on to earn his second NBA All-Star appearance during the 2020–21 season. The team also signed Oshae Brissett this year. The season would end in the 2021 NBA play-in tournament in a loss to the Washington Wizards. After missing the 2021 NBA Playoffs, and amid reported locker room tension, the Pacers fired Bjorkgren on June 9, 2021.

=== 2021–present: Return of Rick Carlisle ===
On June 24, 2021, the Pacers announced that they had reached an agreement with former Dallas Mavericks coach Rick Carlisle to become the next head coach following Bjorkgren's departure. Carlisle previously was an assistant coach for the Pacers from 1997 to 2000, and was also the head coach of the Pacers previously from 2003 to 2007. The team also hired former Charlotte Hornets assistant and Indiana-native Ronald Nored as well as former Atlanta Hawks head coach Lloyd Pierce to serve as lead assistant to Carlisle. The arrival of Carlisle also brought over Jenny Boucek and Mike Weinar, both formerly serving with the Dallas Mavericks. Boucek served as the first female assistant coach for the Pacers franchise. In the 2021 NBA draft, the Pacers selected Chris Duarte with the 13th pick and traded up for the 22nd pick, Isaiah Jackson. Duarte was selected to the 2022 NBA All-Rookie Second Team.

==== 2022–present: The Tyrese Haliburton era ====
The Pacers failed to qualify for the 2022 NBA Playoffs with a record of 25–57 in the 2021–22 NBA season, which marks the first time the team failed to reach the playoffs for consecutive seasons since 2007–10. The 2021–22 season also saw fan-favorite Lance Stephenson serve his third stint with the Pacers franchise. During the season, the Pacers traded away core players including Domantas Sabonis, Caris LeVert, Justin Holiday, Jeremy Lamb, and Malcolm Brogdon between seasons. In return, the Pacers notably received multiple first-round draft picks, sharpshooter Buddy Hield, veterans Daniel Theis and Tristan Thompson, as well as young stars Tyrese Haliburton, Jalen Smith and Aaron Nesmith, all lottery picks in the 2020 NBA draft.

The team would go on to draft Bennedict Mathurin sixth overall in the 2022 NBA draft along with standout second-round pick Andrew Nembhard. Mathurin was the Pacers' highest pick the franchise has owned since selecting Rik Smits second overall in the 1988 NBA draft. On January 31, 2023, both Mathurin and Nembhard were named 2023 NBA Rising Stars. Tyrese Haliburton was also selected to his first ever NBA All-Star Game in 2023 as a reserve guard for the Eastern Conference. Both Tyrese Haliburton and Buddy Hield were selected to participate in the 2023 NBA Three-Point Contest. At the 2023 trade deadline, the team acquired three future second-round picks, Jordan Nwora, Serge Ibaka, as well as Indiana-native and former Pacer, George Hill in exchange for the draft rights to Juan Pablo Vaulet. On March 25, against the Atlanta Hawks, Jordan Nwora posted his Pacers season-high 33 points and added six rebounds, scoring 25 of his 33 points in the second quarter, setting the Pacers regular season franchise record for most points in a quarter since tracking began in the 1996–97 NBA season. At the conclusion of the season, Bennedict Mathurin passed Chris Duarte for most three-pointers made as a rookie in Pacers franchise history. Additionally, Buddy Hield broke Reggie Miller's record of most three-pointers made in a season in Pacers history. Furthermore, Bennedict Mathurin finished fourth in the 2023 NBA Rookie of the Year Award voting and earned NBA All-Rookie Team honors.

Following a 35–47 record in the 2022–23 season, the 2023 NBA draft saw the Pacers select Bilal Coulibaly seventh overall. The Washington Wizards selected Jarace Walker with the eighth overall pick and immediately traded him to the Pacers along with two future second-round picks for the draft rights to Bilal Coulibaly. Following several draft-day trades, the Pacers walked away with the eighth pick Jarace Walker, the 26th pick Ben Sheppard, the 47th pick Mojave King, and the 55th pick Isaiah Wong. On July 1, 2023, Jarace Walker signed his rookie contract with the Pacers alongside Ben Sheppard.

On July 6, 2023, during NBA free agency, Haliburton officially signed a max contract extension with the Pacers worth up to $260 million over five years. It was also announced that Haliburton would represent the United States men's national team at the 2023 FIBA Basketball World Cup. The same day, the team announced they had signed Bruce Brown to a two-year, $45 million contract.

During the 2023 off-season, the Pacers made several acquisitions including trading away Chris Duarte to the Sacramento Kings in exchange for two future second-round picks. Oshae Brissett left the Pacers to sign a contract with the Boston Celtics while the team decided against bringing back veteran George Hill but later re-signed James Johnson. In addition, the Pacers acquired Obi Toppin, the eighth overall pick in the 2020 NBA draft, from the New York Knicks in exchange for two future second-round picks. On the Pacers, Toppin joined Jalen Smith, Tyrese Haliburton, Aaron Nesmith, and Jordan Nwora, all selected in the 2020 NBA draft. The same off-season, the team announced they had lost Ronald Nored to an assistant coaching position with the Atlanta Hawks, while simultaneously rehiring former Pacers assistant and Chicago Bulls head coach Jim Boylen to replace Nored, who had been previously serving as a Pacers consultant. The team also hired former Pacer player Shayne Whittington as an assistant to Carlisle. In a surprising move, the Pacers brought back Larry Bird to serve as a consultant, returning to the franchise for the first time since July 2022.

The Pacers were particularly successful in the 2023 NBA In-Season Tournament, beating the Boston Celtics and Milwaukee Bucks en route to reaching the In-Season Tournament finals against the Los Angeles Lakers, where they lost 123–109.

On January 17, 2024, it was reported that the Pacers acquired All-Star forward Pascal Siakam in a three-team deal with the Toronto Raptors and New Orleans Pelicans, where the Pacers gave up Bruce Brown, Jordan Nwora, and three future first-round picks for Siakam. On January 25, 2024, Siakam earned his first win as a Pacer in a 134–122 victory against the Philadelphia 76ers, also recording his first triple double of the season. That same day, Haliburton was named an Eastern Conference starting guard for the 2024 NBA All-Star Game, which was played in Indianapolis. This marked his second consecutive All-Star selection and his first selection as a starter.

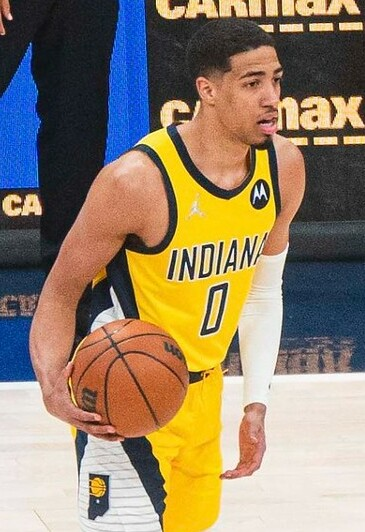
Tyrese Haliburton was acquired in 2022 and is the centerpiece of the Pacers' offense.

The Pacers finished the regular season with a record of 47–35, securing the sixth seed in the Eastern Conference. In the first round they faced the third seed Milwaukee Bucks, who were without star player Giannis Antetokounmpo due to injury. The Pacers won the series 4–2, with second star Damian Lillard also missing time for the Bucks. In the conference semifinals, the Pacers faced the second seed New York Knicks. The Knicks had their own injury issues, with starting forward Julius Randle and role-player Bojan Bogdanovic set to miss the series. The Knicks won game 1 after a series of controversial officiating decisions in the final minute, before also winning game 2, in which they lost OG Anunoby to injury. The Pacers responded by winning games 3 and 4 at home, before the teams traded home wins in games 5 and 6. The Pacers won the series with a historic offensive performance in game 7, winning the series 4–3. They were then beaten by Boston.

On March 27, 2025, the Pacers defeated the Washington Wizards 162–109, breaking their NBA scoring record.

The Pacers ended the 2024–2025 season as the 4th seed winning 50 games and qualifying for the playoffs. They faced the Milwaukee Bucks in the first round and beat them in 5 games. They entered the second round playing against the 1st seed Cleveland Cavaliers. They beat the Cavaliers in 5 games, advancing to the Eastern Conference finals against the New York Knicks. They won in 6 games with Tyrese Halliburton hitting a game-tying 2-point shot in Game 1. After hitting the 2-pointer, Haliburton imitated Reggie Miller's iconic choke sign done in the 1994 Eastern conference finals, also against the Knicks. The Pacers got to their 2nd NBA finals in franchise history, where they faced the Oklahoma City Thunder. They held a 2–1 lead before falling behind 3–2 they were able to force the first Game 7 in the finals since the 2016 NBA Finals. In the Game 7, Haliburton would tear his Achilles tendon in the first quarter, and would miss all of the following season.

The 2024–25 Pacers were well known for their unexpected comebacks throughout the playoffs, such as Game 5 against the Bucks, Game 2 against the Cavaliers, Game 1 against the Knicks, and Game 1 of the Finals against the Thunder. Due to their comebacks, the level of competition they had to face, such as both #1 seeds, the Cavaliers and Thunder, and Haliburton's astounding clutch performance throughout the playoffs, such as three game-winners vs. Milwaukee, Cleveland, and Oklahoma City, and a game-tying shot vs. New York, the Pacers were widely considered to have one of the most improbable playoff runs in NBA history.

2025–26 saw the Pacers finish with their worst record in franchise history at 19–63, with multiple key players missing time, including Haliburton's year-long absence from his achilles injury along with the off-season departure of Myles Turner to the rival Milwaukee Bucks after ten seasons with the franchise. They also had their two longest losing streaks at 13 games and 16 games.

== Home arenas ==
=== Indiana State Fairgrounds Coliseum (1967–1974) ===
The Indiana State Fairgrounds Coliseum was home to the Pacers from 1967 to 1974. The Pacers were very successful in their tenure at the Coliseum, winning three ABA Championships. They captured the ABA titles in 1969–70, defeating the Los Angeles Stars in six games, in 1971–72, defeating the New York Nets in six games, and in the 1972–73 season, defeating the Kentucky Colonels in seven games. The team moved to Market Square Arena in 1974. In 1976, the Pacers became a franchise in the National Basketball Association (NBA) when the ABA merged with the NBA.

=== Market Square Arena (1974–1999) ===
Market Square Arena was home of the Indiana Pacers from 1974 to 1999. The first Pacers basketball game ever held in the arena was a preseason game against the Milwaukee Bucks; attendance was 16,929. The first regular-season ABA game in the arena was held on October 18, 1974, against the San Antonio Spurs; the Pacers lost in double overtime, 129–121 in front of 7,473 fans. The 1974–75 season ended for the Pacers with the ABA Finals played in Market Square Arena and Freedom Hall against their archrivals, the Kentucky Colonels. The Colonels defeated the Pacers in that championship series, winning the ABA title in five games. The 1975–76 Pacers won their final home ABA game in Market Square Arena with a 109–95 victory against the Colonels. (Kentucky won the next game by one point to win the series and advance, ending the Pacers' ABA tenure.) The Pacers continued to play in Market Square Arena after they joined the NBA, with their first game at the arena as an NBA team being a 129–122 overtime loss to the Boston Celtics on October 21, 1976. Michael Jordan's return to the Chicago Bulls after his first retirement took place at Market Square Arena in a loss to the Pacers on March 19, 1995. The final Pacers game to be played in Market Square Arena was a pre-season exhibition game against the Utah Jazz on October 23, 1999.

=== Conseco, Bankers Life, and Gainbridge Fieldhouse (1999–present) ===
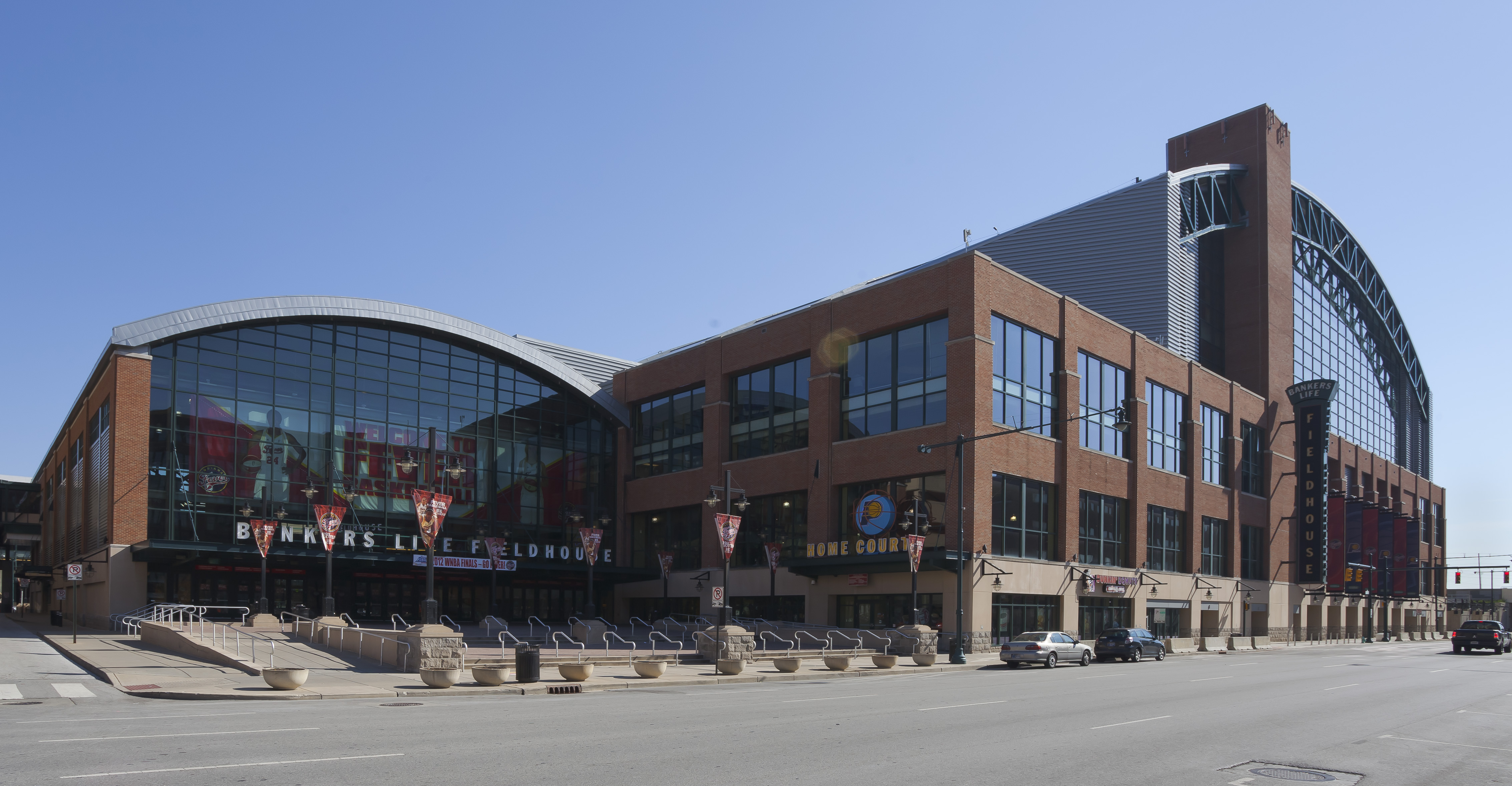
Bankers Life Fieldhouse in 2012.

The Indiana Pacers play their home games at Gainbridge Fieldhouse, which opened in 1999. Gainbridge Fieldhouse is located in downtown Indianapolis and is owned and operated by the Capital Improvement Board, City of Indianapolis and its groundbreaking was on July 22, 1997, by Ellerbe Becket Architects & Engineers. Originally known as Conseco Fieldhouse, the arena officially opened on November 6, 1999. The Fieldhouse is considered one of the best arenas in the NBA, being rated the best venue in the NBA according to the Sports Business Journal/Sports Business Daily Reader Survey. The arena was renamed to Bankers Life Fieldhouse on December 22, 2011, after a subsidiary company of Conseco. The arena adopted its current name on September 27, 2021, being sponsored by Indianapolis-based financial platform Gainbridge. It presently seats 18,165 for basketball games, down from the original 18,345 due to removal of bleacher seats at the south end in favor of adding a premium club area known as Legends. Gainbridge Fieldhouse is also the home of the Indiana Fever of the Women's National Basketball Association (WNBA), who are also owned by Herb Simon via Pacers Sports & Entertainment (PS&E).

It hosted the Big Ten men's basketball tournament in 2002, 2004, 2006, 2008–2012, 2014, 2016, 2022, and 2025. Gainbridge has been the home to the NCAA Division I Men's Basketball Tournament in 2017, 2021, 2022, and 2024. Previously, the men's tournament was held at Market Square Arena in 1978 and 1982. Furthermore, the stadium hosted the NCAA Division I Women's Basketball Tournament in 2011, 2016, and 2028. The Fieldhouse also hosted the 2024 NBA All-Star Weekend. It hosts concerts and philanthropic events as well.

== Logos and uniforms ==
The Indiana Pacers colors are (navy) blue, yellow (gold), cool gray and white. The original team colors of blue and yellow, using a more medium shade of blue, came from the flag of Indiana.

=== ABA years ===
The Pacers wear blue and white uniforms with yellow trim. Their initial uniforms featured either the state or team name in block letters, with some changes in striping. The shorts initially featured contrasting side stripes with the team name written inside, before simplifying altogether. The "P" logo would debut on the white uniform in the 1970–71 season.

Ahead of the 1971–72 season, the Pacers debuted their "double stripes" uniform, featuring said stripes running through the right side. The "P" logo then occupied the left leg. This uniform would be worn during two of their three ABA championship seasons. In 1974, the stripes were modified, and both the team and state name was changed to a script lettering design.

=== 1976–1990 ===
The Pacers reverted to a simpler look reminiscent of their early ABA years upon moving to the NBA in 1976, this time extending the side stripes through the uniform. After one season, the white uniform was tweaked, incorporating the "P" logo to the "PACERS" wordmark. Slight changes were made in the early 1980s, with both the white and blue uniform incorporating the team logo on the left leg and changing the typeface on the state and team name. The white uniform was then replaced with a gold uniform in 1983, featuring the state name.

In 1985, the Pacers radically changed their uniform, featuring a contrasting stripe on the chest and incorporating a "streaking bullet" stripe across the "PACERS" wordmark. Initially, the numbers were located on the left chest and right leg, but was changed the following year, with the numbers now centered and the team logo replacing the shorts number. This would be the first uniform that Reggie Miller wore upon joining the Pacers.

=== 1990–1997: FloJos ===
Midway through the 1989–90 season, the Pacers introduced a new uniform that would debut the following season. Designed by track and field star Florence Griffith Joyner, the uniform featured a darker navy blue and deeper yellow palette, and incorporated a Helvetica-like typeface with drop shadows. The contrasting side stripes on the right taper towards the top of the uniform. The logo itself removed the outstretched hand and added some lines towards the yellow basketball to signify motion. This look became synonymous with the Pacers' mid-1990s success, which included two Conference Finals appearances and a budding rivalry with the New York Knicks.

=== 1997–2005: Pinstripes ===
The arrival of Larry Bird in 1997 brought a new look to the Pacers. Block letters returned as were the contrasting side stripes. For the first time, the uniform incorporated pinstripes, a design feature that was used by a few NBA teams during the 1990s. In the 1998–99 season, a yellow alternate uniform was added. All three uniforms used the state name on the chest. This design would be worn by the Pacers during their first NBA Finals appearance in 2000.

=== 2005–2017: Post-Miller era ===
On September 29, 2005, the Indiana Pacers unveiled then-new uniforms, coinciding with a new era following the retirement of Reggie Miller. This design eliminated the pinstripes and incorporated thinner stripes across the uniform. The team name returned on the white uniform, which also added bolder yellow accents on each side. Silver was also added to both the logo and uniforms. Updated typefaces were introduced, and an alternate roundel logo featuring the full team name in a yellow circle with navy blue and silver borders surrounding the "P" logo also debuted. The roundel logo would make its way to the uniforms. A gold alternate uniform was added ahead of the 2008–09 season. The uniform would become synonymous with Paul George, as he wore this set throughout his Pacers career, including two Conference Finals appearances.

==== Hoosiers uniform ====
On July 21, 2015, the Indiana Pacers, in collaboration with Metro-Goldwyn-Mayer (MGM) Studios, unveiled a new uniform based on the 1986 motion picture Hoosiers. The Pacers wore these maroon and gold "Hickory" (the name and colors of the fictional High School from the film) uniforms for several home games and a few select road contests during the 2015–16 season. It is the first time a major North American pro sports team wore a uniform based on a film.

=== 2017–present: Nike era ===
The Indiana Pacers unveiled new uniforms and logos to coincide with the NBA's uniform contract with Nike on July 28, 2017. The roundel logo, which had been the alternate since 2005, was promoted to a "Global" logo. Initially, the white "Association", navy blue "Icon" and yellow "Statement" uniforms mirrored each other, with the full team name encircling the uniform number and subtle pinstripes added on each side. However, ahead of the 2019–20 season, the Pacers released an updated "Statement" uniform, which was a nod to the FloJo design from 1990 to 1997. The right side incorporated subtle silver pinstripes as a nod to Indiana's farmlands, while the state name was emblazoned on the chest. This "Statement" uniform was worn during their second NBA Finals appearance in 2025. The "Statement" uniform was again updated prior to the 2026–27 season, incorporating pinstripes as a nod to the 1997–2005 uniforms.

==== "City" and "Earned" uniforms ====
A fourth uniform set, the "City" uniform, was also part of Nike's contract with the NBA. The Pacers' first "City" uniform is in navy blue with subtle yellow racing flag stripes on the left side. A vertical orientation of the state name was emblazoned within the yellow stripe and yellow numbers were encircled in a nod to IndyCar racing history. A white and navy blue version of the uniform served as its "City" uniform in the 2019–20 season.

The 2018–19 "City" uniform was loosely based on the 1990s FloJos design and was also inspired by Indiana's racing history. It featured a gray base with an italicized "PACERS" wordmark in yellow trimmed in navy blue. A tapered navy blue stripe with yellow pinstripes was hugely inspired by a similar motif that defined the FloJo uniforms. A white version served as its "Earned" uniform that season as a reward for making the NBA playoffs the previous year.

For the Pacers' 2020–21 "City" uniform, they revived the original royal blue and yellow shade worn in their ABA years while incorporating pinstripes as a nod to the early 2000s teams. This design with a yellow base and navy blue pinstripes was used as its "Earned" uniform that season.

The following season, the Pacers wore a "mix-tape" version of the "City" uniform in commemoration of the NBA's 75th anniversary. The design featured subtle nods to the franchise's history, from the "streaking bullet" stripe of the late 1980s to the 1990s FloJos striping, as well as a reimagined version of the classic Pacers logo which merged the current gold ball with the outstretched arm of the original logo. This design was reused for two seasons starting in 2025, but recolored to a white base and the original shades of royal blue and yellow.

The "City" uniform in the 2022–23 season honored the team's current home of Gainbridge Fieldhouse. Black was featured heavily on the uniform, with the only blue elements seen on the top. Subtle yellow stripes separate the blue and black bases.

The Pacers' "City" uniform in the 2023–24 season featured a black base with light blue and yellow accents, incorporating a graffiti-style "INDY" wordmark across the chest. This uniform was a nod to Indiana's art scene. A white version was worn as their "City" uniform the following season.

== Rivalries ==
=== Detroit Pistons ===
The Pacers and Pistons met for the first time in the 1990 Playoffs; the Pistons swept the Pacers in three straight games on their way to their second straight NBA championship. But the rivalry truly began in the 2000s, specifically during the 2003–04 season. The Pacers finished with a league-best 61 wins and were led by Jermaine O'Neal, Ron Artest, and Reggie Miller, and coached by Rick Carlisle. Carlisle had been fired by Detroit at the end of the previous season. Detroit was led by Chauncey Billups, Ben Wallace, Rasheed Wallace, Tayshaun Prince, and Richard Hamilton, and coached by former Pacers head coach Larry Brown. Indiana won the first three matchups in the regular season, before being defeated by the Pistons in the final regular-season meeting at the Palace. That was also the first time the two met after Rasheed Wallace was traded to Detroit.

They met in the 2004 Eastern Conference finals. Indiana narrowly won game 1, thanks to some late heroics from Miller. Rasheed, unimpressed, stated "they will not win game 2" during an interview before the second game (locally known as the "Guaran-Sheed" victory). Late in game 2, Detroit held a two-point lead, Billups turned over the ball, and Miller appeared to have an uncontested lay-up that would have tied the game. However, before Miller could score, he was chased down by Prince, who leapt from behind and blocked the shot. Near the end of game 6, when Detroit held a slight lead, Artest committed a flagrant foul on Hamilton, which nearly caused tempers to boil over. Detroit won the series 4–2, and went on to win the NBA title.

On November 19, 2004, at The Palace of Auburn Hills, what has become known as the Malice at the Palace took place. Nine players were suspended for varying lengths after a violent altercation in the stands. Artest received the longest penalty: the remainder of the season.

That year teams split the four regular season meetings. They met in the Eastern Conference semifinals and split the first two games. The Pacers blew an 18-point lead, but still won game 3 in Indianapolis. However, just as he did a year earlier, Rasheed promised a win in game 4 saying, "When we return, we will be tied at two". The Pistons won games 4 and 5. The Pacers, knowing a loss would lead to Miller's retirement, fought hard, but fell to the Pistons 88–79.

=== New York Knicks ===
The Knicks–Pacers Rivalry has been heavily documented since 1977. During the 1990s, the Knicks and Pacers were perennial playoff teams. They met in the playoffs six times from 1993 to 2000, fueling a rivalry epitomized by the enmity between Reggie Miller and prominent Knick fan Spike Lee. The rivalry was likened by Miller to the Hatfield–McCoy feud, and described by The New York Times, in 1998 as being "as combustible as any in the league". During those years, the Pacers were led by a core of Reggie Miller, Rik Smits, Mark Jackson, Jalen Rose, Chris Mullin, Dale Davis, Antonio Davis, Derrick McKey, Detlef Schrempf, and others. On the other hand, the Knicks consistently built teams around Patrick Ewing, John Starks, Charles Oakley, Allan Houston, Larry Johnson, Latrell Sprewell, as well as former Pacer legend Herb Williams.

The Knicks and Pacers next met in the 2013 Eastern Conference semifinals with the Pacers upsetting the New York Knicks 4–2. This series included Pacers All–Star Paul George, David West, Roy Hibbert, George Hill, Lance Stephenson, Tyler Hansbrough, Gerald Green, Ian Mahinmi, and D. J. Augustin. The Knicks consisted of All-Star Carmelo Anthony, J. R. Smith, Raymond Felton, Tyson Chandler, Jason Kidd, Iman Shumpert, Rasheed Wallace, Kenyon Martin, and Marcus Camby. The Pacers battled without All-Star forward Danny Granger as he sustained a season-ending injury, while Knicks All-Star big-man Amar'e Stoudemire also experienced limited playing-time due to injury. Following the season, Chris Copeland left the Knicks to sign with the Pacers.

The Knicks and Pacers would again meet in the 2024 Eastern Conference semifinals. The Pacers were now led by All-Star point guard Tyrese Haliburton, joined by Myles Turner, Pascal Siakam, Aaron Nesmith and Andrew Nembhard in the starting lineup. The "Nova Knicks" in turn were led by their own All-Star point guard, Jalen Brunson, while other key players included Julius Randle, OG Anunoby, Mitchell Robinson, Donte DiVincenzo and Josh Hart. Despite Randle missing the series due to injury, the Knicks jumped out to a series lead after winning game 1 at home, via a series of controversial officiating decisions in the final minute, before also winning game 2, in which they lost Anunoby to injury. The Pacers responded by winning games 3 and 4 at home, before the teams traded home wins in games 5 and 6. The Pacers won the series with a historic offensive performance in game 7, winning the series 4–3.

=== Miami Heat ===
The two franchises first met in the 2004 NBA playoffs, when Indiana won 4–2 in the Eastern Conference semifinals. Indiana was seen as title contenders, having the first seed in the Eastern Conference, and the best record in the league, led by Reggie Miller, Jermaine O'Neal, Ron Artest, and Al Harrington. The Heat were led by rookie Dwyane Wade, Lamar Odom, Eddie Jones, and Caron Butler, with this being Wade's first ever playoff experience. The Pacers would go on to lose in six games in the Eastern Conference finals to the eventual 2004 NBA champion Detroit Pistons. Following the 2003–04 NBA season, and before meeting again in 2012, Indiana remained competitive in the Eastern Conference, while Miami would win their first ever championship in 2006 after acquiring Shaquille O'Neal.

A true rivalry with the Miami Heat was triggered in the Eastern Conference semifinals of the 2012 NBA playoffs. During the series, both head coaches were fined for statements made relating to the officiating: Frank Vogel accused the Heat of flopping before the series started, while Erik Spoelstra took offense to what he perceived to be deliberate "head-hunting" of his players on the part of the Pacers. In 2012, Indiana took a 2–1 lead after Miami's Chris Bosh was sidelined with an abdominal strain. Powered by LeBron James and Dwyane Wade, Miami won three straight games to take the series, 4–2 and later become 2012 NBA Champions. The series was marked by several suspensions, flagrant fouls, and confrontations between the players: Tyler Hansbrough's flagrant foul on Dwyane Wade (which drew blood), Udonis Haslem's retaliatory flagrant foul on Hansborough (which led to Haslem's game 6 suspension), Wade colliding with Darren Collison in transition, Juwan Howard confronting Lance Stephenson over the latter's flashing of the choke sign to James, and Dexter Pittman elbowing Stephenson in the neck (which led to his own three-game suspension). Indiana's Danny Granger received technical fouls in three consecutive games for his confrontations with Heat players; he stripped James of his headband in game 2, while attempting to block a shot, pulled the back of James' jersey in game 3, while trying to stop a fast-break, and chest-bumped Wade in game 4 after the latter was fouled by Roy Hibbert.

The following season saw improvements for both teams, from Miami's acquisitions of Ray Allen and Chris Andersen, to the emergence of Paul George and Lance Stephenson in the absence of Danny Granger due to a season-ending injury. Notably, it was after the Heat lost to the Pacers that they compiled a 27-game winning streak; the last time the Heat lost two in a row in the year were the games against Indiana and Portland. During the waning minutes of game 6 in the conference semifinals between the Pacers and the New York Knicks, the Pacers' fans were chanting "Beat The Heat" as their team beat their old New York rivals. True to form, the Heat and the Pacers met in the conference finals of the 2013 NBA playoffs on May 22, 2013. Several instances of physicality became prominent in the series: Shane Battier received an offensive foul for throwing his knee at Hibbert's midsection; Hibbert claimed that it was intentional dirty play on the part of Battier. Andersen suffered a bloodied nose after colliding with David West. Ian Mahinmi received a retroactive flagrant foul for a grab of James' arm. Norris Cole latched a hand on West's groin area as he tried to slip through West. Wade received a retroactive flagrant foul for hitting Stephenson in the head, another incident that the Pacers, notably Paul George, felt was a dirty play. The Heat survived game 1 on a James game-winning layup, while the Pacers came back to tie the series at 1–1 after forcing James into two late fourth-quarter turnovers for game 2. In Game 3, the Heat set a team record for points in a postseason half with 70. It was the first time the Pacers had given up 70 points since 1992. Allen's single turnover was the least ever suffered by the Heat in a first half. Their five total turnovers is tied for the fewest in franchise history. The game 3 victory marked the first time that an NBA team had won five straight road games by double digits. The Heat won the series 4–3, with a 99–76 win in game 7, eventually becoming 2013 NBA champions.

In the 2014 NBA playoffs, the Pacers and Heat renewed their rivalry in a second consecutive Eastern Conference finals match up. Indiana entered the series with home court advantage, having earned the first seed in the Eastern Conference, with a 56–26 record during the 2013–14 season. Indiana's core players from this series included Paul George, David West, Lance Stephenson, George Hill, Roy Hibbert, and new acquisitions, Evan Turner, Luis Scola, and Andrew Bynum. Likewise, Miami's key players again consisted of LeBron James, Dwyane Wade, Chris Bosh, Ray Allen, Mario Chalmers, as well as newcomers Greg Oden and Michael Beasley. Even though the Pacers were viewed as legitimate title contenders, Miami eliminated Indiana again, this time in six games.

In 2023, the last players active on either team was Udonis Haslem on the Heat and George Hill on the Pacers, who both competed in all three 2012, 2013, and 2014 playoff series.

Indiana and Miami would meet again for the first time since 2014 in the 2020 NBA playoffs with the Heat sweeping the Pacers in the first round. Indiana was led by Victor Oladipo, Malcolm Brogdon, T.J. Warren and Myles Turner. The Heat were led by Jimmy Butler, Bam Adebayo, Goran Dragić, and Tyler Herro, who ended up reaching the 2020 NBA Finals. Indiana sustained significant injuries preventing All-Star Domantas Sabonis and Jeremy Lamb from playing in the 2020 NBA Bubble.

=== Milwaukee Bucks ===
While the franchises have been divisional rivals since 1976 (originally as part of the Midwest Division, though both have since moved to the Central Division), it is only in recent years that the matchup has been described as a true rivalry. On December 7, 2023, the two teams met in Las Vegas, Nevada during the semifinals of that season's inaugural In-Season Tournament. While the Bucks led for most of the game, the Pacers staged a comeback in the fourth quarter, culminating in Tyrese Haliburton hitting a game-winning stepback 3-pointer over Bucks center Brook Lopez. Haliburton then tapped his wrist, mimicking Bucks guard Damian Lillard's iconic "Dame Time" celebration. The loss resulted in Bobby Portis later calling out former Bucks coach Adrian Griffin in the locker room, as well as his other teammates.

Almost a week later, on December 13, the teams met at Fiserv Forum in Milwaukee, wherein Bucks franchise superstar Giannis Antetokounmpo scored a career-high 64 points. In the same game, Pacers rookie Oscar Tshiebwe scored his first career points, resulting in both teams wanting the official game ball to give to their players. At the end of the game, both teams had a basketball, but confusion arose towards who had the game ball; believing that the Pacers had it, multiple Bucks players entered the Pacers' tunnel to retrieve it, leading to a verbal altercation between Antetokounmpo and Haliburton. Footage later showed a member of Bucks' security receiving a ball from the officials towards the end of the game, however it is not known if it was the game ball or an alternate, with Antetokounmpo later stating he did not believe it to be the game ball. Pacers coach Rick Carlisle also alleged a member of the Bucks of elbowing general manager Chad Buchanan in the ribs, though this was not confirmed and multiple Bucks players chose not to comment on it.

The matchup intensified during the first round of the 2024 NBA Playoffs, where the 3rd-seed Bucks had home-court advantage over the 6th-seed Pacers. The Pacers' core players included Tyrese Haliburton, Pascal Siakam, Myles Turner, Benedict Mathurin, and Andrew Nembhard. The Bucks' core included Giannis Antetokounmpo, Damian Lillard, Khris Middleton, Brook Lopez, and Bobby Portis. The Bucks dealt with injury trouble throughout the series, with Antetokounmpo not playing the entire series and Lillard missing games 4 and 5. Despite missing key contributors, the Bucks were able to remain competitive, though in the end the Pacers won the series 4–2.

The two teams met again in the first round of the 2025 NBA Playoffs, featuring an almost identical core from the Pacers, whereas the Bucks had traded Middleton for Kyle Kuzma at the trade deadline and added Gary Trent Jr. in free agency. The Pacers had earned the 4th-seed and home-court advantage after going 50–32 in the regular season, whereas the Bucks owned the 5th-seed with a 48–34 record. While Antetokoumpo was healthy and played every game of the series, Lillard missed game 1, playing in games 2, 3, and 4 before tearing his achilles tendon in the latter game, ending his season. The Pacers would win the series 4–1 in game 5, following a comeback win from the Pacers and a game-winning basket from Tyrese Haliburton. When the game concluded, Antetokounmpo was involved in a scuffle with Benedict Mathurin, and later a verbal altercation with Haliburton's father, John. John Haliburton would later be barred from attending Pacers games for most of their playoff run. The Pacers would go on to make it to that year's NBA Finals, but lost the Oklahoma City Thunder in 7 games, wherein Tyrese Haliburton would tear his achilles tendon in the final game of the series. That offseason began with a shocking move where Pacers center Myles Turner, who was the team's longest tenured player (having been with the team since 2015) signed with the Bucks, who had lost veteran center Brook Lopez to the Los Angeles Clippers in free agency. Pacers executives later stated they had been willing to enter the luxury tax to keep Turner, but had not had the chance to match Milwaukee's offer.

== Season-by-season record ==
List of the last five seasons completed by the Pacers. For the full season-by-season history, see List of Indiana Pacers seasons.

Note: GP = Games played, W = Wins, L = Losses, W–L% = Winning percentage

Overview of recent Pacers seasons
Season	GP	W	L	W–L%	Finish	Playoffs
2021–22	82	25	57	.305	4th, Central	Did not qualify
2022–23	82	35	47	.427	4th, Central	Did not qualify
2023–24	82	47	35	.573	3rd, Central	Lost in conference finals, 0–4 (Celtics)
2024–25	82	50	32	.610	2nd, Central	Lost in NBA Finals, 3–4 (Thunder)
2025–26	82	19	63	.232	5th, Central	Did not qualify

== Personnel ==
=== Current roster ===
Indiana Pacers roster
Players

Pos.	No.	Player	Height	Weight	DOB	From
F	24	Kobe Brown (TW)	6 ft 7 in (2.01 m)	250 lb (113 kg)	2000-01-01	Missouri
G	12	Johnny Furphy (injured)	6 ft 8 in (2.03 m)	200 lb (91 kg)	2004-12-08	Kansas
G	0	Tyrese Haliburton (injured)	6 ft 5 in (1.96 m)	185 lb (84 kg)	2000-02-29	Iowa State
C	32	Jay Huff	7 ft 1 in (2.16 m)	240 lb (109 kg)	1997-08-25	Virginia
G	29	Quenton Jackson	6 ft 4 in (1.93 m)	173 lb (78 kg)	1998-09-15	Texas A&M
G	9	T. J. McConnell	6 ft 1 in (1.85 m)	190 lb (86 kg)	1992-03-25	Arizona
F/C	22	Larry Nance Jr.	6 ft 8 in (2.03 m)	245 lb (111 kg)	1993-01-01	Wyoming
G/F	2	Andrew Nembhard	6 ft 4 in (1.93 m)	191 lb (87 kg)	2000-01-16	Gonzaga
G/F	23	Aaron Nesmith	6 ft 5 in (1.96 m)	215 lb (98 kg)	1999-10-16	Vanderbilt
G/F	10	Kelly Oubre Jr.	6 ft 7 in (2.01 m)	210 lb (95 kg)	1995-09-12	Kansas
G	26	Ben Sheppard (injured)	6 ft 6 in (1.98 m)	190 lb (86 kg)	2001-07-16	Belmont
F	43	Pascal Siakam	6 ft 9 in (2.06 m)	245 lb (111 kg)	1994-04-02	New Mexico State
F	18	Jalen Slawson (TW)	6 ft 7 in (2.01 m)	215 lb (98 kg)	1999-10-22	Furman
G	3	Braden Smith (TW)	5 ft 11 in (1.80 m)	170 lb (77 kg)	2003-07-25	Purdue
F	1	Obi Toppin	6 ft 9 in (2.06 m)	220 lb (100 kg)	1998-03-04	Dayton
F	5	Jarace Walker	6 ft 7 in (2.01 m)	235 lb (107 kg)	2003-09-04	Houston
C	40	Ivica Zubac	7 ft 0 in (2.13 m)	240 lb (109 kg)	1997-03-18	Croatia

Coaches
Head coach
- Rick Carlisle
Assistant(s)
- Maurice Baker
- Jenny Boucek
- Jim Boylen
- Jannero Pargo
- Lloyd Pierce
- Isaac Yacob

Legend
- (DP) Unsigned draft pick
- (FA) Free agent
- (S) Suspended
- (GL) On assignment to G League affiliate
- (TW) Two-way affiliate player
- Injured

Roster
Updated: October 17, 2026

=== Retired numbers ===
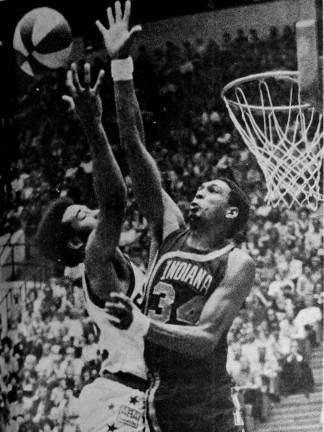
Mel Daniels (right) played for Indiana from 1968 to 1974. His uniform No. 34 was retired in 1985

Indiana Pacers retired numbers
No.	Player	Position	Tenure	Date
30	George McGinnis	F	1971–1975; 1980–1982	November 2, 1985
31	Reggie Miller	G	1987–2005	March 30, 2006
34	Mel Daniels	C^{1}	1968–1974	November 2, 1985
35	Roger Brown	F	1967–1974, 1975	November 2, 1985
529	Bobby Leonard	Coach	1968–1980	March 15, 1996

Notes:

- ^{1} Also served as coach (1988)
- The NBA retired Bill Russell's No. 6 for all its member teams on August 11, 2022.

=== Naismith Memorial Basketball Hall of Famers ===
Indiana Pacers players Hall of Famers
No.	Name	Position	Tenure	Inducted
22	Alex English	F	1978–1980	1997
4	Adrian Dantley	F/G	1977	2008
25	Gus Johnson	F/C	1972–1973	2010
17	Chris Mullin	F/G	1997–2000	2011
34	Mel Daniels	C	1968–1974	2012
31	Reggie Miller	G	1987–2005	2012
1; 35	Roger Brown	F/G	1967–1974; 1975	2013
30	George McGinnis	F	1971–1975; 1980–1982	2017
14	Tim Hardaway	G	2003	2022

Indiana Pacers coaches Hall of Famers
No.	Name	Position	Tenure	Inducted
—N/a	Jack Ramsay	Head coach	1986–1988	1992
—N/a	Larry Brown	Head coach	1993–1997	2002
529	Bobby Leonard	Head coach	1968–1980	2014

Indiana Pacers contributors Hall of Famers
Name	Position	Tenure	Inducted
Herb Simon	Owner	1983–present	2024

Notes:

- ^{1}In total, Mullin was inducted into the Hall of Fame twice – as player and as member of the 1992 Olympic team.
- ^{2}He also coached the Pacers in 1988.
- ^{3}Inducted posthumously.

=== FIBA Hall of Famers ===
Indiana Pacers FIBA Hall of Famers
No.	Name	Position	Tenure	Inducted
11	Detlef Schrempf	F	1989–1993	2021
16	Peja Stojaković	F	2006	2024
31	Reggie Miller	G	1987–2005	2024

== Head coaches ==
There have been 13 head coaches for the Pacers franchise. Larry Staverman was the first coach of the team in 1967, when the team was in the ABA. Coach Bobby Leonard has the most wins in franchise history, with 529 in his 12 seasons with the team. After Leonard, Jack McKinney, George Irvine, and Jack Ramsay. When Ramsay abruptly resigned in 1988 after the team got off to a weak start, Pacers legend Mel Daniels took over on an interim basis for two games, before Irvine returned for 20 more. Dick Versace then led the Pacers through another sub-par stretch before Bob Hill got the Pacers back to the playoffs and into contention. Then in 1993, Larry Brown joined the Pacers franchise and led the team to many playoff appearances as Reggie Miller blossomed into a superstar and eventual Hall of Famer. Larry Bird took over the team in 1997 and coached until 2000. Bird took the Pacers to their first NBA Finals appearance in the 1999–2000 season. Isiah Thomas, Rick Carlisle, and Jim O'Brien were next up as the Pacers top coach. The most recent head coach of the Pacers was Frank Vogel, until May 5, 2016, when his contract was not renewed after the seventh-seeded Pacers lost game 7 of the first round of the 2016 NBA playoffs to the number two seeded Toronto Raptors. Subsequently, associate head coach Nate McMillan was promoted to the top spot. After four seasons in which he compiled a 183–136 record, McMillan and the team parted ways on August 26, 2020, just two weeks after it had been announced that the team had re-signed him. On October 20, 2020, the team hired former Toronto Raptors assistant coach Nate Bjorkgren as their new head coach. Bjorkgren would lead the Pacers to a 34–38 record in his lone season and the team missed the playoffs. On June 24, 2021, the Pacers re-hired Rick Carlisle for a second stint as the team's head coach.

== Franchise records and individual awards ==
=== Franchise leaders ===
Bold denotes still active with team.

Italic denotes still active but not with team.

Points scored (regular season) (as of the end of the 2025–26 season)

1. Reggie Miller (25,279)
2. Rik Smits (12,871)
3. Billy Knight (10,780)
4. Roger Brown (10,058)
5. Jermaine O'Neal (9,580)
6. Danny Granger (9,571)
7. George McGinnis (9,545)
8. Vern Fleming (9,535)
9. Mel Daniels (9,314)
10. Freddie Lewis (9,257)
11. Chuck Person (9,096)
12. Myles Turner (9,031)
13. Herb Williams (8,637)
14. Paul George (8,090)
15. Bob Netolicky (8,078)
16. Billy Keller (6,588)
17. Dale Davis (6,523)
18. Detlef Schrempf (6,009)
19. Roy Hibbert (5,909)
20. Jalen Rose (5,712)

Other statistics (regular season) (as of the end of the 2025–26 season)

Most minutes played
Player	Minutes
Reggie Miller	47,619
Rik Smits	23,100
Vern Fleming	22,974
Roger Brown	20,315
Dale Davis	19,814
Freddie Lewis	19,534
Herb Williams	18,455
Myles Turner	18,454
Jermaine O'Neal	17,997
Billy Knight	17,787

Most rebounds
Player	Rebounds
Mel Daniels	7,643
Dale Davis	6,006
Rik Smits	5,277
Jeff Foster	5,248
George McGinnis	5,219
Jermaine O'Neal	4,933
Bob Netolicky	4,566
Herb Williams	4,494
Myles Turner	4,349
Reggie Miller	4,182

Most assists
Player	Assists
Reggie Miller	4,141
Vern Fleming	4,038
Mark Jackson	3,294
Jamaal Tinsley	2,786
Don Buse	2,737
**T. J. McConnell**	2,367
Freddie Lewis	2,279
**Tyrese Haliburton**	2,259
Roger Brown	2,214
Travis Best	1,980

Most steals
Player	Steals
Reggie Miller	1,505
Don Buse	1,284
Vern Fleming	885
George McGinnis	752
Paul George	740
Jamaal Tinsley	660
Billy Knight	651
Danny Granger	545
Derrick McKey	512
Jeff Foster	507

Most blocks
Player	Blocks
Myles Turner	1,412
Jermaine O'Neal	1,245
Rik Smits	1,111
Herb Williams	1,094
Roy Hibbert	990
Dale Davis	904
Darnell Hillman	611
Danny Granger	471
Len Elmore	423
Clemon Johnson	415

=== NBA individual awards ===
NBA Eastern Conference Finals Most Valuable Player

- Pascal Siakam – 2025

NBA Defensive Player of the Year

- Ron Artest – 2004

NBA Rookie of the Year

- Chuck Person – 1987

NBA Sixth Man of the Year

- Detlef Schrempf – 1991, 1992

NBA Most Improved Player of the Year

- Jalen Rose – 2000
- Jermaine O'Neal – 2002
- Danny Granger – 2009
- Paul George – 2013
- Victor Oladipo – 2018

NBA Coach of the Year

- Jack McKinney – 1981
- Larry Bird – 1998

NBA Executive of the Year

- Larry Bird – 2012

All-NBA Second Team

- Jermaine O'Neal – 2004

All-NBA Third Team

- Reggie Miller – 1995, 1996, 1998
- Jermaine O'Neal – 2002, 2003
- Ron Artest – 2004
- Paul George – 2013, 2014, 2016
- Victor Oladipo – 2018
- Tyrese Haliburton – 2024, 2025

NBA All-Defensive First Team

- Don Buse – 1977
- Ron Artest – 2004
- Paul George – 2014
- Victor Oladipo – 2018

NBA All-Defensive Second Team

- Dudley Bradley – 1981
- Micheal Williams – 1992
- Derrick McKey – 1995, 1996
- Ron Artest – 2003
- Paul George – 2013, 2016
- Roy Hibbert – 2014

Magic Johnson Award

- Jermaine O'Neal – 2004

J. Walter Kennedy Citizenship Award

- Reggie Miller – 2004
- Malcolm Brogdon – 2020

USA Basketball Male Athlete of the Year

- Chuck Person – 1985
- Reggie Miller – 2002

NBA All-Rookie First Team

- Clark Kellogg – 1983
- Steve Stipanovich – 1984
- Chuck Person – 1987
- Rik Smits – 1989
- Bennedict Mathurin – 2023

NBA All-Rookie Second Team

- Jamaal Tinsley – 2002
- Danny Granger – 2006
- Paul George – 2011
- Myles Turner – 2016
- Chris Duarte – 2022

NBA Annual Assists Leaders

- Don Buse – 1977
- Mark Jackson – 1997
- Tyrese Haliburton – 2024

NBA Annual Steals Leaders

- Don Buse – 1977
- Victor Oladipo – 2018

NBA Annual Blocks Leaders

- Myles Turner – 2019, 2021

NBA Annual Three-Point Field Goal Leaders

- Don Buse – 1982
- Reggie Miller – 1993, 1997

NBA Annual Three-Point Field Goal Percentage Leaders

- Darren Collison – 2018

NBA Annual Free Throw Percentage Leaders

- Reggie Miller – 1991, 1999, 2001, 2002, 2005
- Chris Mullin – 1998

NBA 50–40–90 Club

- Reggie Miller – 1994

NBA All-Seeding Games First Team

- T. J. Warren – 2020

NBA 75th Anniversary Team

- Reggie Miller – 2021

Top 15 Greatest Coaches in NBA History

- Larry Brown – 2021
- Jack Ramsay – 2021

Top 10 Coaches in NBA History

- Jack Ramsay – 1996

=== ABA individual awards ===
ABA Most Valuable Player Award

- Mel Daniels – 1969, 1971
- George McGinnis – 1975

ABA Playoffs Most Valuable Player

- Roger Brown – 1970
- Freddie Lewis – 1972
- George McGinnis – 1973

ABA All-Star Game Most Valuable Player Award

- Mel Daniels – 1971

ABA All-Star East Head coach

- Bobby Leonard – 1970

ABA All-Star selections

- Bob Netolicky – 1968, 1969, 1970, 1971
- Roger Brown – 1968, 1970, 1971, 1972
- Freddie Lewis – 1968, 1970, 1972
- Mel Daniels – 1969, 1970, 1971, 1972, 1973, 1974
- George McGinnis – 1973, 1974, 1975
- Billy Knight – 1976
- Don Buse – 1976

All-ABA First Team

- Mel Daniels – 1969, 1970, 1971
- Roger Brown – 1971
- George McGinnis – 1974, 1975
- Billy Knight – 1976

All-ABA Second Team

- Roger Brown – 1968, 1970
- Bob Netolicky – 1970
- George McGinnis – 1973
- Mel Daniels – 1973
- Don Buse – 1976

ABA All-Defensive Team

- Don Buse – 1975, 1976

ABA All-Rookie Team

- Bob Netolicky – 1968
- George McGinnis – 1972
- Billy Knight – 1975

ABA All-Time Team

- Mel Daniels – 1997
- George McGinnis – 1997
- Roger Brown – 1997
- Donnie Freeman – 1997
- Freddie Lewis – 1997
- Billy Knight – 1997
- Bob Netolicky – 1997
- Warren Jabali – 1997

ABA All-Time Coaches

- Bobby "Slick" Leonard – 1997

=== NBA All-Star Weekend ===
NBA All-Star selections

- Billy Knight – 1977
- Don Buse – 1977
- Reggie Miller – 1990, 1995, 1996, 1998, 2000
- Detlef Schrempf – 1993
- Rik Smits – 1998
- Dale Davis – 2000
- Jermaine O'Neal – 2002, 2003, 2004, 2005, 2006, 2007
- Brad Miller – 2003
- Ron Artest – 2004
- Danny Granger – 2009
- Roy Hibbert – 2012, 2014
- Paul George – 2013, 2014, 2016, 2017
- Victor Oladipo – 2018, 2019
- Domantas Sabonis – 2020, 2021
- Tyrese Haliburton – 2023, 2024
- Pascal Siakam – 2025, 2026

NBA All-Star Eastern Conference head coach

- Larry Bird – 1998
- Isiah Thomas – 2003
- Rick Carlisle – 2004
- Frank Vogel – 2014

NBA Rising Stars Challenge head coach

- Nate McMillan – 2014

NBA All-Star Legends Game

- Mel Daniels – 1985
- Roger Brown – 1985
- Phil Chenier – 1991
- Dan Roundfield – 1991, 1992, 1993

NBA Three-Point Contest

- Reggie Miller – 1989, 1990, 1993, 1995, 1998
- Danny Granger – 2009
- Paul George – 2013
- Buddy Hield – 2023
- Tyrese Haliburton – 2023, 2024

NBA Rising Stars Challenge Most Valuable Player

- Bennedict Mathurin – 2024

NBA Rising Stars Challenge

- Antonio Davis – 1994
- Erick Dampier – 1997
- Jamaal Tinsley – 2002, 2003
- Šarūnas Jasikevičius – 2006
- Danny Granger – 2006, 2007
- Paul George – 2012
- Myles Turner – 2017
- Domantas Sabonis – 2018
- Chris Duarte – 2022
- Tyrese Haliburton – 2022
- Andrew Nembhard – 2023
- Bennedict Mathurin – 2023, 2024
- Oscar Tshiebwe – 2024

NBA Skills Challenge

- Domantas Sabonis – 2020, 2021
- Myles Turner – 2024
- Bennedict Mathurin – 2024
- Tyrese Haliburton – 2024

NBA Clorox Clutch Challenge

- Tyrese Haliburton – 2022
- Chris Duarte – 2022

NBA Slam Dunk Contest

- Darnell Hillman – 1977
- Terence Stansbury – 1985, 1986
- Kenny Williams – 1991
- Antonio Davis – 1994
- Jonathan Bender – 2001
- Fred Jones – 2004
- Paul George – 2012, 2014
- Gerald Green – 2013
- Glenn Robinson III – 2017
- Victor Oladipo – 2018
- Cassius Stanley – 2021

== Mascot ==
Boomer, the Pacers Panther, has been the official team mascot since the 1991–1992 season. Boomer is known for performing high flying dunks and dance moves. Boomer has performed for multiple NBA All-Star Games. He used to have a partner, known as Bowser who was a canine ("K-9") mascot that worked in tandem with Boomer who was retired during the 2009–10 season.

== Dance squad ==
Founded in 1967, the same year as the Pacers franchise, the Indiana Pacemates were one of the original professional sports dance squads and the first such entity in the NBA. Originally known in the ABA era as the Marathon Scoreboard Girls, then later as the Paul Harris Pacesetters, the Pacemates name has been used since the 1972–1973 season.

Preceded by Oakland Oaks (1969)	ABA champions 1969–70	Succeeded by Utah Stars (1971)
Preceded by Utah Stars (1971)	ABA champions 1971–72, 1972–73	Succeeded by New York Nets (1974)
