= Dick Tinkham =

American sports executive

- Born: Richard P. Tinkham; June 24, 1932
- Died: October 14, 2018 (aged 86)
- Education: Law degree
- Alma mater: University of Michigan
- Occupation: Sports executive
- Years active: 1967-2018
- Known for: Establishing the American Basketball Association and the Indiana Pacers

Richard P. Tinkham (June 24, 1932 – October 14, 2018) was an American sports executive who was the co-founder of the American Basketball Association with Joe Newman.

== Biography ==
Tinkham grew up in Hammond, Indiana. He graduated from DePauw University, where he was on the varsity basketball and relay teams, before earning his law degree from the University of Michigan law school in 1957. He later served in the United States Marine Corps, where he reached the rank of captain and served as general court martial counsel. Afterwards, he started a legal practice in Indianapolis, and chaired the ABA–NBA merger.

In 1967, he co-founded the original ABA and the Indiana Pacers franchise, serving for two years as President of the ABA Board of Trustees. Tinkham was also owner and executive of the Pacers franchise, and was responsible for its early success. He hired Mike Storen, then business manager of the Cincinnati Royals, as the first general manager of the Pacers. Tinkham and Storen had first met while serving in the Marines together. In 1972–75, he was instrumental in the creation of Market Square Arena in Indianapolis.

Tinkham died on October 14, 2018, from muscular dystrophy at the age of 86.
