= 1952 NCAA basketball tournament =

Edition of USA college basketball tournament

- Season: 1951–52
- Teams: 16
- Finals site: Hec Edmundson Pavilion, Seattle, Washington
- Champions: Kansas Jayhawks (1st title, 2nd title game, 2nd Final Four)
- Runner-up: St. John's Redmen (1st title game, 1st Final Four)
- Semifinalists: Illinois Fighting Illini (3rd Final Four); Santa Clara Broncos (1st Final Four)
- Winning coach: Phog Allen (1st title)
- MOP: Clyde Lovellette (Kansas)
- Attendance: 115,712
- Top scorer: Clyde Lovellette (Kansas) (141 points)

The 1952 NCAA basketball tournament involved 16 schools playing in single-elimination play to determine the national champion of men's NCAA Division I college basketball. The 14th annual edition of the tournament began on March 21, 1952, and ended with the championship game on March 26, at the Hec Edmundson Pavilion, located on the University of Washington's campus in Seattle. A total of 20 games were played, including a third place game in each region and a national third place game.

Kansas, coached by Phog Allen, won the national title with an 80–63 victory in the final game over St. John's, coached by Frank McGuire. Clyde Lovellette of Kansas was named the tournament's Most Outstanding Player.

This tournament was the first to have a true "Final Four" format, with the winners at four regional sites advancing to the final site—although the four regionals did not receive distinct names until the 1956 tournament. It was also the first to have regional television coverage.

== Locations ==
The following are the sites selected to host each round of the 1952 tournament:

=== Regionals ===
March 21 and 22
East-1 Regional, Reynolds Coliseum, Raleigh, North Carolina (Host: North Carolina State University)
East-2 Regional, Chicago Stadium, Chicago, Illinois (Hosts: Northwestern University, Loyola University Chicago, DePaul University)
West-1 Regional, Municipal Auditorium, Kansas City, Missouri (Host: Missouri Valley Conference)
West-2 Regional, Oregon State Coliseum, Corvallis, Oregon (Host: Oregon State University)

=== Final Four ===
March 25 and 26
Hec Edmundson Pavilion, Seattle, Washington (Host: University of Washington)

== Teams ==
Region	Team	Coach	Conference	Finished	Final Opponent	Score
East
East	Dayton	Tom Blackburn	Independent	Regional third place	Princeton	W 77–61
East	Duquesne	Dudey Moore	Independent	Elite Eight	Illinois	L 74–68
East	Illinois	Harry Combes	Big Ten	Third Place	Santa Clara	W 67–64
East	Kentucky	Adolph Rupp	Southeastern	Elite Eight	St. John's	L 64–57
East	NC State	Everett Case	Southern	Regional third place	Penn State	W 69–60
East	Penn State	Elmer Gross	Independent	Regional Fourth Place	NC State	L 69–60
East	Princeton	Franklin Cappon	Ivy League	Regional Fourth Place	Dayton	L 77–61
East	St. John's	Frank McGuire	Metro NY	Runner-up	Kansas	L 80–63
West
West	Kansas	Phog Allen	Big 7	Champion	St. John's	W 80–63
West	New Mexico A&M	George McCarty	Border	Regional Fourth Place	TCU	L 61–44
West	Oklahoma City	Doyle Parrack	Independent	Regional third place	UCLA	W 55–53
West	Santa Clara	Bob Feerick	Independent	Fourth Place	Illinois	L 67–64
West	Saint Louis	Eddie Hickey	Missouri Valley	Elite Eight	Kansas	L 74–55
West	TCU	Buster Brannon	Southwest	Regional third place	New Mexico A&M	W 61–44
West	UCLA	John Wooden	Pacific Coast	Regional Fourth Place	Oklahoma City	L 55–53
West	Wyoming	Everett Shelton	Mountain States	Elite Eight	Santa Clara	L 56–53

== Bracket ==
=== East-1 regional – Raleigh, North Carolina ===
Regional Semifinals; March 21
Kentucky	82
Penn State	54
St. John's	60
NC State	49

Regional Finals; March 22
Kentucky	57
St John's	64
Third place
NC State	69
Penn State	60

=== East-2 regional – Chicago, Illinois ===
Regional Semifinals; March 21
Illinois	80
Dayton	61
Duquesne	60
Princeton	49

Regional Finals; March 22
Illinois	74
Duquesne	68
Third place
Dayton	77
Princeton	61

=== West-1 regional – Kansas City, Missouri ===
Regional Semifinals; March 21
Kansas	68
TCU	64
Saint Louis	62
New Mexico A&M	53

Regional Finals; March 22
Kansas	74
Saint Louis	55
Third place
TCU	61
New Mexico A&M	44

=== West-2 regional – Corvallis, Oregon ===
Regional Semifinals; March 21
Santa Clara	68
UCLA	59
Wyoming	54
Oklahoma City	48

Regional Finals; March 22
Santa Clara	56
Wyoming	53
Third place
Oklahoma City	55
UCLA	53

=== Final Four – Seattle, Washington ===
National Semifinals; March 25
St John's	61
Illinois	59
Kansas	74
Santa Clara	55

National Finals; March 26
St. John's	63
Kansas	80
Third place
Illinois	67
Santa Clara	64

== See also ==
- 1952 National Invitation Tournament
- 1952 NAIA Basketball Tournament
