= La Salle Explorers men's basketball statistical leaders =

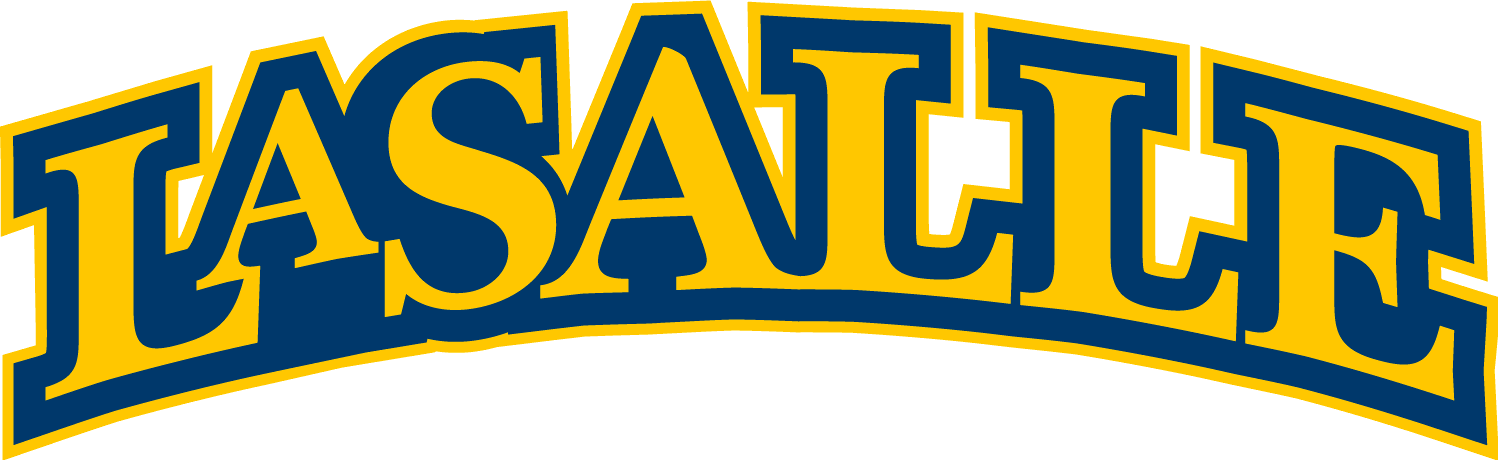

The La Salle Explorers men's basketball statistical leaders are individual statistical leaders of the La Salle Explorers men's basketball program in various categories, including points, rebounds, assists, steals, and blocks. Within those areas, the lists identify single-game, single-season, and career leaders. The Explorers represent La Salle University in the NCAA's Atlantic 10 Conference.

La Salle began competing in intercollegiate basketball in 1930. However, the school's record book does not generally list records from before the 1950s, as records from before this period are often incomplete and inconsistent. Since scoring was much lower in this era, and teams played much fewer games during a typical season, it is likely that few or no players from this era would appear on these lists anyway.

The NCAA did not officially record assists as a stat until the 1983–84 season, and blocks and steals until the 1985–86 season, but La Salle's record books includes players in these stats before these seasons. These lists are updated through the end of the 2020–21 season.

== Scoring ==
Career
Rank	Player	Points	Seasons
1	Lionel Simmons	3,217	1986–87 1987–88 1988–89 1989–90
2	Michael Brooks	2,628	1976–77 1977–78 1978–79 1979–80
3	Tom Gola	2,461	1951–52 1952–53 1953–54 1954–55
4	Rasual Butler	2,125	1998–99 1999–00 2000–01 2001–02
5	Donnie Carr	2,067	1996–97 1997–98 1998–99 1999–00
6	Steve Black	2,012	1981–82 1982–83 1983–84 1984–85
7	Steven Smith	1,940	2002–03 2003–04 2004–05 2005–06
8	Kareem Townes	1,925	1992–93 1993–94 1994–95
9	Rodney Green	1,914	2006–07 2007–08 2008–09 2009–10
10	Randy Woods	1,811	1989–90 1990–91 1991–92

Season
Rank	Player	Points	Season
1	Lionel Simmons	908	1988–89
2	Randy Woods	847	1991–92
	Lionel Simmons	847	1989–90
4	Lionel Simmons	792	1987–88
5	Tom Gola	750	1954–55
6	Michael Brooks	747	1979–80
7	Kareem Townes	699	1994–95
8	Michael Brooks	696	1977–78
9	Tom Gola	690	1953–54
10	Hubie Marshall	674	1965–66

Single game
Rank	Player	Points	Season	Opponent
1	Kareem Townes	52	1994–95	Loyola (Ill.)
2	Michael Brooks	51	1979–80	Brigham Young
3	Randy Woods	46	1990–91	Loy. Marymount
4	Doug Overton	45	1990–91	Loy. Marymount
	Ken Durrett	45	1970–71	W. Kentucky
6	Ken Durrett	44	1969–70	Lafayette
	Rasual Butler	44	2001–02	Rhode Island
8	Randy Woods	42	1991–92	Fairfield
	Randy Woods	42	1991–92	California
	Hubie Marshall	42	1965–66	Louisville
	Hubie Marshall	42	1965–66	Albright
	Bob McAteer	42	1961–62	Millersville

== Rebounds ==
NCAA Division I record

Career
Rank	Player	Rebounds	Seasons
1	Tom Gola	2,201	1951–52 1952–53 1953–54 1954–55
2	Lionel Simmons	1,429	1986–87 1987–88 1988–89 1989–90
3	Michael Brooks	1,372	1976–77 1977–78 1978–79 1979–80
4	Ralph Lewis	966	1981–82 1982–83 1983–84 1984–85
5	Steven Smith	872	2002–03 2003–04 2004–05 2005–06
6	Ken Durrett	850	1968–69 1969–70 1970–71
7	Steve Zack	843	2011–12 2012–13 2013–14 2014–15
8	Jerrell Wright	841	2011–12 2012–13 2013–14 2014–15
9	Norm Grekin	832	1950–51 1951–52 1952–53
10	George Sutor	826	1962–63 1963–64 1964–65

Season
Rank	Player	Rebounds	Season
1	Tom Gola	652	1953–54
2	Tom Gola	618	1954–55
3	Tom Gola	497	1951–52
4	Tom Gola	434	1952–53
5	Lionel Simmons	386	1987–88
6	Jackie Moore	367	1951–52
7	Lionel Simmons	365	1988–89
8	Michael Brooks	356	1977–78
9	Lionel Simmons	356	1989–90
	Michael Brooks	356	1979–80

Single game
Rank	Player	Rebounds	Season	Opponent
1	Tom Gola	37	1954–55	L Lebanon Valley

== Assists ==
Career
Rank	Player	Assists	Seasons
1	Doug Overton	671	1987–88 1988–89 1989–90 1990–91
2	Julian Blanks	570	1998–99 1999–00 2000–01 2001–02
3	Paul Burke	567	1991–92 1992–93 1993–94 1994–95
4	Tyreek Duren	500	2010–11 2011–12 2012–13 2013–14
5	Darryl Gladden	461	1976–77 1977–78 1978–79 1979–80
	Chip Greenberg	461	1982–83 1983–84 1984–85 1985–86
7	Rich Tarr	429	1984–85 1985–86 1986–87 1987–88
8	Jhamir Brickus	426	2020–21 2021–22 2022–23 2023–24
9	Charlie Wise	407	1972–73 1973–74 1974–75 1975–76
10	Donnie Carr	404	1996–97 1997–98 1998–99 1999–00

Season
Rank	Player	Assists	Season
1	Doug Overton	244	1988–89
2	Doug Overton	212	1989–90
3	Rich Tarr	189	1986–87
4	Darryl Gladden	186	1977–78
5	Paul Burke	180	1993–94
6	Julian Blanks	174	2001–02
	Greg Webster	174	1980–81
8	Rich Tarr	168	1987–88
9	Paul Burke	166	1994–95
10	Shawn Smith	165	1995–96

Single game
Rank	Player	Assists	Season	Opponent
1	Doug Overton	18	1988–89	Holy Cross

== Steals ==
Career
Rank	Player	Steals	Seasons
1	Doug Overton	277	1987–88 1988–89 1989–90 1990–91
2	Lionel Simmons	239	1986–87 1987–88 1988–89 1989–90
3	Tyreek Duren	227	2010–11 2011–12 2012–13 2013–14
4	Randy Woods	220	1989–90 1990–91 1991–92
5	Paul Burke	214	1991–92 1992–93 1993–94 1994–95
6	Jack Hurd	205	1988–89 1989–90 1990–91 1991–92
7	Ralph Lewis	200	1981–82 1982–83 1983–84 1984–85
8	Kareem Townes	196	1992–93 1993–94 1994–95
9	Rodney Green	185	2006–07 2007–08 2008–09 2009–10
10	Chip Greenberg	176	1982–83 1983–84 1984–85 1985–86

Season
Rank	Player	Steals	Season
1	Doug Overton	98	1988–89
2	Randy Woods	89	1989–90
3	Doug Overton	85	1989–90
4	Kareem Townes	75	1994–95
	Randy Woods	75	1991–92
6	Lionel Simmons	71	1987–88
7	Ralph Lewis	70	1983–84
8	Shawn Smith	65	1996–97
	Paul Burke	65	1993–94
	Kareem Townes	65	1993–94
	Ramon Galloway	65	2012–13

Single game
Rank	Player	Steals	Season	Opponent
1	Doug Overton	8	1988–89	Army
	Paul Burke	8	1993–94	Detroit
	Shawn Smith	8	1997–98	Virginia Tech

== Blocks ==
Career
Rank	Player	Blocks	Seasons
1	Lionel Simmons	248	1986–87 1987–88 1988–89 1989–90
2	Steve Zack	169	2011–12 2012–13 2013–14 2014–15
3	Aaric Murray	143	2009–10 2010–11
4	Rasual Butler	120	1998–99 1999–00 2000–01 2001–02
5	Clifton Moore	116	2020–21 2021–22
6	Jerrell Wright	107	2011–12 2012–13 2013–14 2014–15
	Ron Barnes	107	1985–86 1986–87
8	Ralph Lewis	94	1981–82 1982–83 1983–84 1984–85
9	Anwar Wilson	91	1998–99 1999–00 2000–01
10	Devon White	83	2009–10 2010–11 2011–12

Season
Rank	Player	Blocks	Season
1	Clifton Moore	83	2021–22
2	Lionel Simmons	77	1987–88
3	Aaric Murray	73	2010–11
4	Aaric Murray	70	2009–10
5	Lionel Simmons	65	1989–90
6	Lionel Simmons	61	1988–89
7	Steve Zack	58	2014–15
	Steve Zack	58	2013–14
9	Ron Barnes	57	1985–86
10	Travar Johnson	52	1996–97

Single game
Rank	Player	Blocks	Season	Opponent
1	Aaric Murray	9	2010–11	Morgan St.
