= 1951–52 NCAA men's basketball season =

Men's collegiate basketball season

- Preseason AP No. 1: None; Kentucky Wildcats (UP)
- NCAA Tournament: 1952
- Tournament dates: March 21, 1952 – March 26, 1952
- National Championship: Hec Edmundson Pavilion; Seattle, Washington
- NCAA Champions: Kansas Jayhawks
- Helms National Champions: Kansas Jayhawks
- Other champions: La Salle Explorers (NIT)
- Player of the Year (Helms): Clyde Lovellette, Kansas Jayhawks

The 1951–52 NCAA men's basketball season began in December 1951, progressed through the regular season and conference tournaments, and concluded with the 1952 NCAA basketball tournament championship game on March 26, 1952, at Hec Edmundson Pavilion in Seattle, Washington. The Kansas Jayhawks won their first NCAA national championship with an 80–63 victory over the St. John's Redmen.

== Season headlines ==
- The 1951–52 season was the last one in which colleges and universities could include non-collegiate opponents in their schedules with the games recognized as part of their official record for the season, a common practice for many years. After the season, the NCAA ruled that colleges and universities could no longer count games played against non-collegiate opponents in their annual won-loss records.
- Long Island University began the first season of its six-year ban from playing NCAA basketball as a result of the CCNY point-shaving scandal that had been revealed in 1951.
- After finishing second in the Southern Conference in regular-season play, North Carolina State became the first team to receive an automatic NCAA tournament bid by winning its conference tournament championship without finishing first in its conference during the regular season.
- The 1952 NCAA tournament was the first NCAA tournament to have four regional sites, and therefore was the first to have a true "Final Four," with the winners at four regional sites advancing to play at the finals site. Although four teams had advanced to the finals site since 1946, they previously had come from only two regional sites.
- Elmer Gross of Penn State became the first head coach to lead his alma mater into the NCAA tournament after having played in the tournament. He had played for Penn State in the 1942 NCAA basketball tournament.
- Doyle Parrack of Oklahoma City became the first head coach to lead a school other than his alma mater into the NCAA tournament after having played in the tournament. He had played for Oklahoma A&M in the 1945 NCAA basketball tournament.
- Clyde Lovellette of Kansas became the first player to score 40 or more points in an NCAA tournament game when he scored 44 against Saint Louis in a West Region final game on March 22, 1952. He was the first player to lead the United States in scoring and win the NCAA title in the same year.
- The NCAA tournament received regional television coverage for the first time.
- In the Olympic Trials held immediately after the tournaments, NCAA champion Kansas defeated NAIA champion Southwest Missouri State in the collegiate semi-finals and then NIT champion La Salle in the collegiate final. This was the first time the NIT and NCAA champions had met since the Red Cross benefit game in 1945. Kansas lost to the AAU champion Peoria Caterpillars in the Olympic Trials overall final.

== Harlem Globetrotters vs. Seattle University ==
On January 21, 1952, the Harlem Globetrotters played Seattle in a game designed to raise funds for the United States Olympic efforts. Five days before the game was held, Royal Brougham received a call from Howard Hobson, who was the Yale basketball coach and a United States Olympic Committee member. It was reported that money was needed to support the country's Olympic effort for the games held in Helsinki, Finland. The Globetrotters had agreed to a three-game fund-raiser against college teams in the West, Midwest and East.

Tickets cost $1.50 and they were sold out in 48 hours. Jazz great Louis Armstrong played at halftime and actress Joan Caulfield performed a ceremonial opening tip off. The game was played at the University of Washington's Hec Edmondson Pavilion and was filled to its 12,500 capacity.

The Globetrotters were considered the best basketball team in the world and the club paid their two star players "Goose" Tatum and Marques Hayes twenty five thousand dollars each. Entering the game with Seattle, the Globetrotters had played 3571 games winning 93 percent of their contests.

Seattle player Johnny O'Brien was the nation's leading scorer at that time. O'Brien would become the first player in the history of college basketball to score 1000 points in a single season. He would finish the season with 1,051 points. Against the Globetrotters, O'Brien poured in 43 points. Johnny's brother Eddie played point guard for Chieftains and his half court shot lifted the club to a 10-point lead.

After halftime, the Globetrotters got back in the game as Johnny O'Brien sat out most of the third quarter. With seconds left in the game, the Globetrotters called a time out they did not have. A free throw was made by Johnny O'Brien and there was a possession change. The Chieftains were ahead 84–81.

Globetrotter owner Abe Saperstein was so upset that he canceled the rest of the Trotters benefit schedule that year.

== Major rule changes ==
Beginning in 1951–52, the following rules change was implemented:

- Games were divided into four 10-minute quarters. Previously, they had been divided into two 20-minute halves.

== Conference membership changes ==
School	Former conference	New conference
Bradley Braves	Missouri Valley Conference	Independent
Drake Bulldogs	Missouri Valley Conference	Independent
Kent State Golden Flashes	Independent	Mid-American Conference
Montana Grizzlies	Independent	Mountain States (Skyline) Conference
New Mexico Lobos	Border Conference	Mountain States (Skyline) Conference
Toledo Rockets	Independent	Mid-American Conference

== New arenas ==
Georgetown, which had played since the 1927–28 season at various off-campus sites, opened McDonough Gymnasium, its first on-campus intercollegiate basketball venue since its final season as Ryan Gymnasium in the 1926–27 season. In the first regular-season game in the new gymnasium, played the day before McDonough's official opening, the Hoyas lost to Fordham 57–50 on December 7, 1951, their only home loss of the season. McDonough served as Georgetown's home court until the Hoyas moved to the Capital Centre (later USAir Arena and USAirways Arena) in Landover, Maryland, for the 1981–82 season, but has hosted occasional Hoya home games since then.

== Regular season ==
=== Conferences ===
==== Conference winners and tournaments ====
Conference	Regular Season Winner	Conference player of the year	Conference Tournament	Tournament Venue (City)	Tournament winner
Big Seven Conference	Kansas	None Selected	No Tournament		
Big Ten Conference	Illinois	None Selected	No Tournament		
Border Conference	New Mexico A&M & West Texas State	None Selected	No Tournament		
Eastern Intercollegiate Basketball League	Princeton	None Selected	No Tournament		
Metropolitan New York Conference	St. John's	None Selected	No Tournament		
Mid-American Conference	Miami & Western Michigan	None Selected	No Tournament		
Missouri Valley Conference	Saint Louis	None Selected	No Tournament		
Mountain States (Skyline) Conference	Wyoming	None Selected	No Tournament		
Ohio Valley Conference	Western Kentucky State	None Selected	1952 Ohio Valley Conference men's basketball tournament	Jefferson County Armory, (Louisville, Kentucky)	Western Kentucky State
Pacific Coast Conference	Washington (North); UCLA (South)	None Selected	No Tournament; UCLA defeated Washington in best-of-three conference championship playoff series		
Southeastern Conference	Kentucky	None Selected	1952 SEC men's basketball tournament	Jefferson County Armory, (Louisville, Kentucky)	Kentucky
Southern Conference	West Virginia	Dick Groat, Duke	1952 Southern Conference men's basketball tournament	Reynolds Coliseum (Raleigh, North Carolina)	North Carolina State
Southwest Conference	TCU	None Selected	No Tournament		
Western New York Little Three Conference	Canisius & St. Bonaventure		No Tournament		
Yankee Conference	Connecticut	None Selected	No Tournament		

==== Conference standings ====
1951–52 Big Seven Conference men's basketball standings
	Conf.				Overall
Team	W		L	PCT	W		L	PCT
No. 8 Kansas	11	–	1	.917	28	–	3	.903
No. 3 Kansas State	10	–	2	.833	19	–	5	.792
Missouri	6	–	6	.500	14	–	10	.583
Iowa State	4	–	8	.333	10	–	11	.476
Colorado	4	–	8	.333	8	–	16	.333
Oklahoma	4	–	8	.333	7	–	17	.292
Nebraska	3	–	9	.250	7	–	17	.292
Rankings from AP Poll

1951–52 Big Ten Conference men's basketball standings
	Conf.				Overall
Team	W		L	PCT	W		L	PCT
No. 2 Illinois	12	–	2	.857	22	–	4	.846
No. 7 Iowa	11	–	3	.786	19	–	3	.864
Minnesota	10	–	4	.714	15	–	7	.682
Indiana	9	–	5	.643	16	–	6	.727
Michigan State	6	–	8	.429	13	–	9	.591
Ohio State	6	–	8	.429	8	–	14	.364
Wisconsin	5	–	9	.357	10	–	12	.455
Michigan	4	–	10	.286	7	–	15	.318
Northwestern	4	–	10	.286	7	–	15	.318
Purdue	3	–	11	.214	8	–	14	.364
Rankings from AP Poll

1951–52 Border Conference men's basketball standings
	Conf.				Overall
Team	W		L	PCT	W		L	PCT
West Texas State†	12	–	2	.857	19	–	9	.679
New Mexico A&M†	14	–	4	.778	22	–	11	.667
Texas Tech	9	–	5	.643	14	–	10	.583
Arizona	6	–	8	.429	11	–	16	.407
Arizona State–Tempe	6	–	8	.429	8	–	16	.333
Hardin–Simmons	5	–	9	.357	17	–	15	.531
Texas Western	5	–	9	.357	8	–	17	.320
Arizona State–Flagstaff	1	–	13	.071	4	–	23	.148
† Regular-season co-championship winner Rankings from AP Poll

1951–52 Eastern Intercollegiate Basketball League standings
	Conf.				Overall
Team	W		L	PCT	W		L	PCT
Princeton	10	–	2	.833	16	–	11	.593
Pennsylvania	9	–	3	.750	21	–	8	.724
Cornell	8	–	4	.667	16	–	9	.640
Columbia	7	–	5	.583	12	–	10	.545
Yale	4	–	8	.333	14	–	14	.500
Dartmouth	4	–	8	.333	11	–	19	.367
Harvard	0	–	12	.000	5	–	17	.227
Rankings from AP Poll

1951–52 Metropolitan New York Conference men's basketball standings
	Conf.				Overall
Team	W		L	PCT	W		L	PCT
No. 10 St. John's	6	–	0	1.000	25	–	6	.806
St. Francis (NY)	4	–	2	.667	20	–	8	.714
Manhattan	4	–	2	.667	12	–	9	.571
Fordham	3	–	3	.500	20	–	8	.714
NYU	2	–	3	.400	17	–	8	.680
CCNY	1	–	5	.167	8	–	11	.421
Brooklyn	0	–	5	.000	9	–	7	.563
Rankings from AP Poll

1951–52 Mid-American Conference men's basketball standings
	Conf.				Overall
Team	W		L	PCT	W		L	PCT
Miami (Ohio)	9	–	3	.750	19	–	6	.760
Western Michigan	9	–	3	.750	16	–	8	.667
Toledo	8	–	4	.667	20	–	11	.645
Ohio	6	–	6	.500	12	–	12	.500
Cincinnati	5	–	5	.500	11	–	16	.407
Kent State	3	–	7	.300	14	–	10	.583
Western Reserve	0	–	12	.000	1	–	23	.042
Rankings from AP Poll

1951–52 Missouri Valley Conference men's basketball standings
	Conf.				Overall
Team	W		L	PCT	W		L	PCT
No. 5 Saint Louis	9	–	1	.900	23	–	8	.742
Oklahoma A&M	7	–	3	.700	19	–	8	.704
Tulsa	5	–	5	.500	14	–	10	.583
Detroit	4	–	6	.400	14	–	12	.538
Houston	3	–	7	.300	7	–	14	.333
Wichita Municipal	2	–	8	.200	11	–	19	.367
Rankings from AP Poll

1951–52 Mountain States Conference men's basketball standings
	Conf.				Overall
Team	W		L	PCT	W		L	PCT
No. 16 Wyoming	13	–	1	.929	28	–	7	.800
BYU	9	–	5	.643	14	–	10	.583
Utah State	9	–	5	.643	16	–	15	.516
Utah	8	–	6	.571	19	–	9	.679
Montana	7	–	7	.500	12	–	14	.462
Denver	6	–	8	.429	11	–	15	.423
Colorado A&M	3	–	11	.214	13	–	15	.464
New Mexico	1	–	13	.071	6	–	19	.240
Rankings from AP Poll

1951–52 Ohio Valley Conference men's basketball standings
	Conf.				Overall
Team	W		L	PCT	W		L	PCT
Western Kentucky State†	11	–	1	.917	26	–	5	.839
Eastern Kentucky State	10	–	2	.833	13	–	11	.542
Murray State		–		–	24	–	10	.706
Marshall		–		–	15	–	11	.577
Morehead State		–		–	11	–	14	.440
Tennessee Tech		–		–	9	–	13	.409
Evansville		–		–	7	–	20	.259
† Ohio Valley Conference Tournament winner Rankings from AP Poll

1951–52 Pacific Coast Conference men's basketball standings
	Conf.				Overall
Team	W		L	PCT	W		L	PCT
North
No. 6 Washington	14	–	2	.875	25	–	6	.806
Idaho	9	–	7	.563	19	–	13	.594
Oregon	8	–	8	.500	14	–	16	.467
Washington State	6	–	10	.375	19	–	16	.543
Oregon State	3	–	13	.188	9	–	19	.321
South
No. 19 UCLA †	8	–	4	.667	19	–	12	.613
Stanford	6	–	6	.500	19	–	8	.704
California	6	–	6	.500	17	–	13	.567
USC	4	–	8	.333	16	–	14	.533
† Conference playoff series winner Rankings from AP Poll

1951–52 Rocky Mountain Conference men's basketball standings
	Conf.				Overall
Team	W		L	PCT	W		L	PCT
Montana State	8	–	2	.800	22	–	14	.611
Colorado State–Greeley	8	–	2	.800	10	–	12	.455
Idaho State	6	–	4	.600	16	–	11	.593
Colorado Mines	5	–	5	.500	10	–	14	.417
Western State (CO)	2	–	8	.200	5	–	15	.250
Colorado College	1	–	9	.100	3	–	19	.136

1951–52 Southeastern Conference men's basketball standings
	Conf.				Overall
Team	W		L	PCT	W		L	PCT
No. 1 Kentucky †	14	–	0	1.000	29	–	3	.906
LSU	9	–	5	.643	17	–	7	.708
Vanderbilt	9	–	5	.643	18	–	9	.667
Alabama	9	–	5	.643	13	–	9	.591
Ole Miss	8	–	6	.571	15	–	11	.577
Florida	7	–	7	.500	15	–	9	.625
Tennessee	7	–	7	.500	13	–	9	.591
Tulane	7	–	7	.500	12	–	12	.500
Auburn	6	–	8	.429	14	–	12	.538
Mississippi State	4	–	10	.286	12	–	11	.522
Georgia Tech	2	–	12	.143	7	–	15	.318
Georgia	2	–	12	.143	3	–	22	.120
† 1952 SEC Tournament winner Rankings from AP Poll

1951–52 Southern Conference men's basketball standings
	Conf.				Overall
Team	W		L	PCT	W		L	PCT
No. 9 West Virginia	15	–	1	.938	23	–	4	.852
North Carolina State †	12	–	2	.857	24	–	10	.706
No. 12 Duke	13	–	3	.813	24	–	6	.800
Clemson	11	–	4	.733	17	–	7	.708
George Washington	12	–	6	.667	15	–	9	.625
Maryland	9	–	5	.643	13	–	9	.591
Furman	9	–	5	.643	18	–	6	.750
William & Mary	10	–	6	.625	15	–	13	.536
South Carolina	8	–	7	.533	14	–	10	.583
Wake Forest	7	–	9	.438	10	–	19	.345
North Carolina	8	–	11	.421	12	–	15	.444
Virginia Tech	3	–	10	.231	4	–	16	.200
Richmond	3	–	11	.214	7	–	15	.318
Washington and Lee	3	–	11	.214	6	–	21	.222
Davidson	4	–	15	.211	7	–	18	.280
VMI	2	–	13	.133	3	–	21	.125
The Citadel	1	–	11	.083	8	–	20	.286
† Southern Conference Tournament winner Rankings from AP Poll

1951–52 Southwest Conference men's basketball standings
	Conf.				Overall
Team	W		L	PCT	W		L	PCT
TCU	11	–	1	.917	24	–	4	.857
Texas	8	–	4	.667	16	–	8	.667
SMU	5	–	7	.417	11	–	13	.458
Texas A&M	5	–	7	.417	9	–	15	.375
Baylor	5	–	7	.417	6	–	18	.250
Arkansas	4	–	8	.333	10	–	14	.417
Rice	4	–	8	.333	9	–	15	.375
Rankings from AP Poll

1951–52 Western New York Little Three Conference men's basketball standings
	Conf.				Overall
Team	W		L	PCT	W		L	PCT
No. 15 St. Bonaventure†		–		–	21	–	6	.778
Canisius†		–		–	15	–	9	.625
Niagara		–		–	8	–	21	.276
† Regular-season co-championship winner Rankings from AP Poll

1951–52 Yankee Conference men's basketball standings
	Conf.				Overall
Team	W		L	PCT	W		L	PCT
Connecticut	6	–	1	.857	20	–	7	.741
Rhode Island	6	–	2	.750	10	–	13	.435
Vermont	3	–	1	.750	14	–	6	.700
New Hampshire	4	–	5	.444	11	–	9	.550
Maine	2	–	6	.250	7	–	12	.368
Massachusetts	0	–	6	.000	4	–	17	.190

=== Major independents ===
A total of 45 college teams played as major independents. Among them, Seton Hall (25–3) finished with the best winning percentage (.853) and Dayton (28–5) with the most wins.

Although not considered major independents during the season, Seattle (27–8) and Texas State (30–1) played as independents and finished the season with national rankings. In the season's final AP Poll, Seattle was ranked No. 18 and Texas State was No. 20.

1951–52 NCAA men's basketball independents standings
	Conf.				Overall
Team	W		L	PCT	W		L	PCT
No. 14 Seton Hall		–		–	25	–	3	.893
No. 13 Holy Cross		–		–	24	–	4	.857
No. 4 Duquesne		–		–	23	–	4	.852
No. 11 Dayton		–		–	28	–	5	.848
La Salle		–		–	24	–	5	.828
Boston College		–		–	22	–	5	.815
Siena		–		–	24	–	6	.800
No. 17 Louisville		–		–	20	–	6	.769
Penn State		–		–	20	–	6	.769
St. Joseph's		–		–	20	–	7	.741
DePaul		–		–	19	–	8	.704
Oklahoma City		–		–	19	–	8	.704
Villanova		–		–	19	–	8	.704
Syracuse		–		–	14	–	6	.700
Navy		–		–	16	–	7	.696
Loyola (Ill.)		–		–	17	–	8	.680
Miami (Fla.)		–		–	14	–	8	.636
Bowling Green State		–		–	17	–	10	.630
Lafayette		–		–	15	–	9	.625
Notre Dame		–		–	16	–	10	.615
Saint Mary's		–		–	16	–	10	.615
Georgetown		–		–	15	–	10	.600
Bradley		–		–	17	–	12	.586
Santa Clara		–		–	17	–	12	.586
Loyola (La.)		–		–	16	–	13	.552
Drake		–		–	13	–	12	.520
Butler		–		–	12	–	12	.500
Valparaiso		–		–	12	–	12	.500
Army		–		–	8	–	9	.471
Loyola (Calif.)		–		–	12	–	14	.462
Marquette		–		–	12	–	14	.462
San Francisco		–		–	11	–	13	.458
Virginia		–		–	11	–	13	.458
Colgate		–		–	10	–	12	.455
Pittsburgh		–		–	10	–	12	.455
John Carroll		–		–	11	–	14	.440
Muhlenberg		–		–	10	–	13	.435
Baldwin Wallace		–		–	9	–	12	.429
Xavier		–		–	10	–	14	.417
Temple		–		–	9	–	15	.375
Lehigh		–		–	7	–	12	.368
Bucknell		–		–	8	–	16	.333
Rutgers		–		–	6	–	13	.316
Creighton		–		–	6	–	15	.286
Brown		–		–	5	–	15	.250
Rankings from AP Poll

=== Informal championships ===
Conference	Regular season winner	Conference player of the year	Conference tournament	Tournament venue (City)	Tournament winner
Middle Three Conference	Lafayette	None selected	No Tournament		

NOTE: Despite its name, the Middle Three Conference was an informal scheduling alliance rather than a true conference, and its members played as independents. In 1951–52, Lafayette finished with the best record in games played between the three members.

=== Statistical leaders ===
"Points per game			Rebounds per game			Assists per game			Field goal percentage		
Player	School	PPG	Player	School	RPG	Player	School	APG	Player	School	FG%
Clyde Lovellette	Kansas	28.4	Bill Hannon	Army	20.9	Tom O'Toole	Boston College	7.9	Art Spoelstra	Western Kentucky State	51.6
Dick Groat	Duke	26.0	Walter Dukes	Seton Hall	19.7	Dick Groat	Duke	7.6	Gerald Rogers	Texas Western	50.4
Bob Pettit	LSU	25.5	Ernie Beck	Penn	19.0	Malcolm McLean	Davidson	7.5	Norm Swanson	Detroit	50.3
Chuck Darling	Iowa	25.5	Elston Tuttle	Creighton	18.9	Larry Friedman	Muhlenberg	7.3	Karl Klinar	VMI	49.2
Frank Selvy	Furman	24.6	Bill Chambers	William & Mary	18.2	Roger Chadwick	Cornell	6.9	Tom Marshall	Western Kentucky State	49.1

Free throw percentage
Name	School	FT%
Sy Chadroff	Miami (FL)	80.5
Bob Kenney	Kansas	80.3
Drew Turner	St. Mary's (CA)	80.2
Tommy Bartlett	Tennessee	80.2
Russell Rerucha	Colorado A&M	80.0

== Year-end polls ==
The final regular-season top 20 from the AP and Coaches Polls.

Associated Press
Ranking	Team
1	Kentucky
2	Illinois
3	Kansas State
4	Duquesne
5	Saint Louis
6	Washington
7	Iowa
8	Kansas
9	West Virginia
10	St. John's
11	Dayton
12	Duke
13	Holy Cross
14	Seton Hall
15	St. Bonaventure
16	Wyoming
17	Louisville
18	Seattle
19	UCLA
20	Texas State

Coaches
Ranking	Team
1	Kentucky
2	Illinois
3	Kansas
4	Duquesne
5	Washington
6	Kansas State
7	Saint Louis
8	Iowa
9	St. John's
10	Wyoming
11	St. Bonaventure
12	Seton Hall
13	Texas Christian
14	West Virginia
15	Holy Cross
16	Western Kentucky State
17	La Salle
18	Dayton
19	Louisville
20	UCLA
20	Indiana

== Postseason tournaments ==
=== NCAA tournament ===
Phog Allen led the Kansas Jayhawks to their first NCAA tournament title, defeating St. John's 80–63. Jayhawk All-American Clyde Lovellette broke the NCAA record by scoring 141 points in the tournament and was named tournament Most Outstanding Player.

==== Final Four ====
National semifinals
St. John's	61
Illinois	59
Kansas	74
Santa Clara	55

National championship game
St. John's	63
Kansas	80
Third place
Illinois	67
Santa Clara	64

=== National Invitation tournament ===
La Salle won the National Invitation Tournament by beating Dayton, 75–64. Tom Gola and Norm Grekin were named co-MVPs.

==== NIT semifinals and final ====
Played at Madison Square Garden in New York City

Semifinals
St. Bonaventure	62
Dayton	69
Duquesne	46
La Salle	59

Final
Dayton	64
La Salle	75
Third place
St. Bonaventure	48
Duquesne	34

== Award winners ==
=== Consensus All-American team ===
Consensus First Team
Player	Position	Class	Team
Chuck Darling	C	Senior	Iowa
Rod Fletcher	G	Senior	Illinois
Dick Groat	G	Senior	Duke
Cliff Hagan	F	Junior	Kentucky
Clyde Lovellette	C	Senior	Kansas

Consensus Second Team
Player	Position	Class	Team
Bob Houbregs	F	Junior	Washington
Don Meineke	F	Senior	Dayton
Johnny O'Brien	G	Junior	Seattle
Mark Workman	C	Senior	West Virginia
Bob Zawoluk	F	Senior	St. John's

=== Major player of the year awards ===
- Helms Foundation Player of the Year: Clyde Lovellette, Kansas

=== Other major awards ===
- NIT/Haggerty Award (Top player in NYC): Ron MacGilvray, St. John's

== Coaching changes ==
A number of teams changed coaches during the season and after it ended.

Team	Former Coach	Interim Coach	New Coach	Reason
Alabama	Floyd Burdette		John Dee	
Arkansas	Presley Askew		Glen Rose	
Bucknell	Jack Guy		Ben Kribbs	Guy left to coach Rhode Island.
Cincinnati	John Wiethe		George Smith	
The Citadel	Bernard O'Neil		Leo Zack	
Creighton	Duce Belford		Sebastian Salerno	
Davidson	Boydson Baird		Danny Miller	
Georgetown	Buddy O'Grady		Buddy Jeannette	After three seasons, O'Grady resigned.
Loyola (Calif.)	Scotty McDonald		Edwin Powell	
Massachusetts	Lorin Ball		Robert T. Curran	
Miami (Fla.)	Hart Morris		Dave Wike	
Michigan	Ernest McCoy		William Perigo	
New Hampshire	Dale Hall		Bob Kerr	
New Mexico	Berl Huffman		Woody Clements	
North Carolina	Tom Scott		Frank McGuire	
Northwestern	Harold Olsen		Waldo A. Fisher	
Rhode Island	Red Haire		Jack Guy	
Richmond	Malcolm Pitt		H. Lester Hooker	
St. John's	Frank McGuire		Al DeStefano	
Temple	Josh Cody		Harry Litwack	
VMI	Bill O'Hara		Chuck Noe	
Washington & Lee	Scotty Hamilton		Billy McCann	
Western Michigan	William Perigo		Joe Hoy	Perigo left to coach Michigan.
