= List of Alabama Crimson Tide men's basketball head coaches =

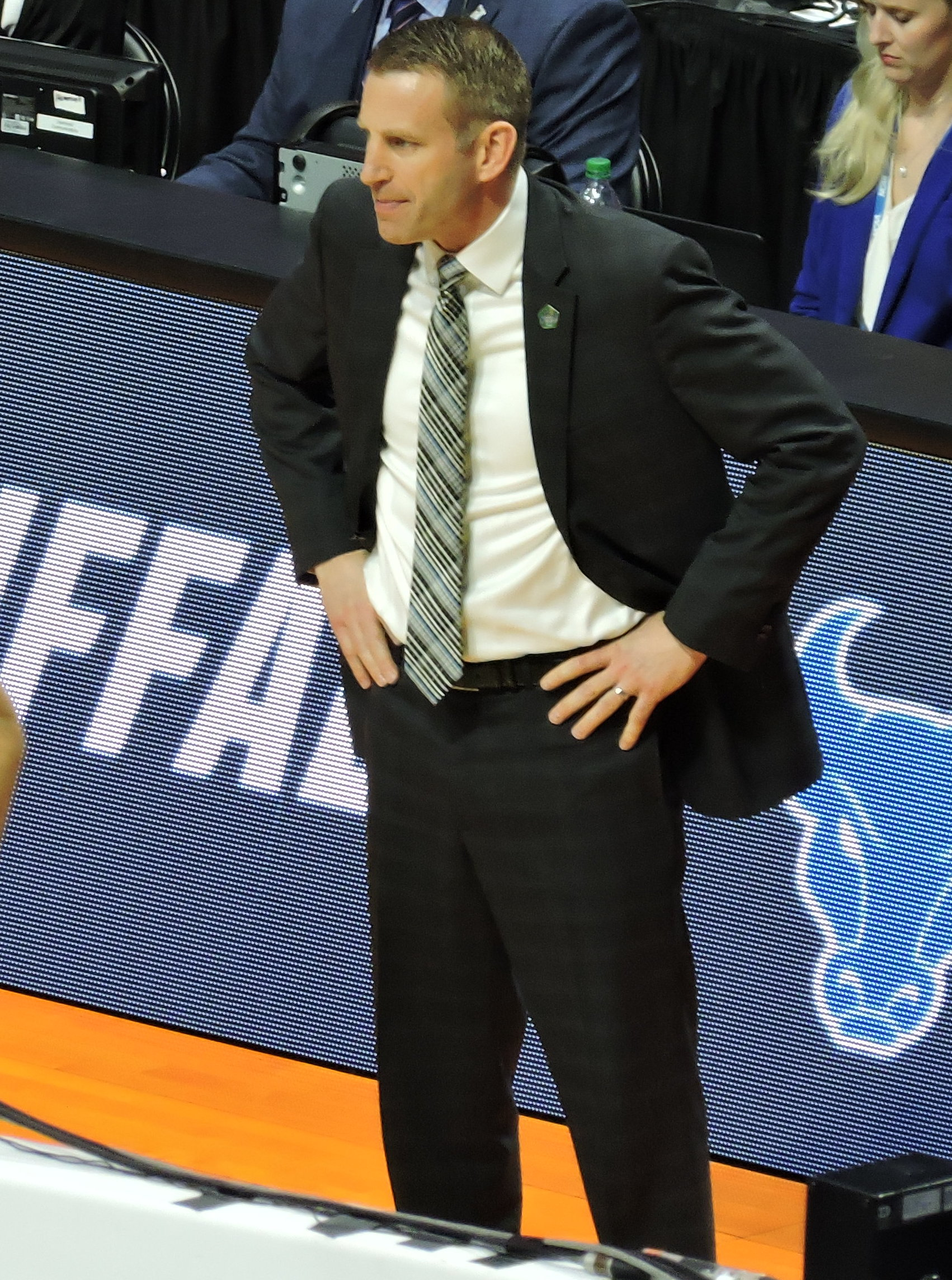
Nate Oats, the current head coach of the Alabama Crimson Tide.

The following is a list of Alabama Crimson Tide men's basketball head coaches. The Crimson Tide have had 21 head coaches in their 110-season history.

Alabama's current head coach is Nate Oats. He was hired in March 2019 to replace Avery Johnson, who was let go by Alabama a few days earlier.

No.	Tenure	Coach	Years	Record	Pct.
1	1912–1915	D. V. Graves	3	20–12	.625
2	1915–1916	Griff Harsh	1	13–4	.765
3	1916–1917	Thomas Kelley	1	6–8	.429
4	1917–1918	B. L. Noojin	1	2–5	.286
5	1918–1919	Yancey Goodall	1	3–3	.500
6	1919–1920	Bill Moore	1	5–7	.417
7	1920–1923	Charles A. Bernier	3	47–19	.712
8	1923–1942; 1945–1946	Hank Crisp	20	264–133	.665
9	1942–1943	Paul Burnum	1	10–10	.500
10	1944–1945	Malcolm Laney	1	10–5	.667
11	1946–1952	Floyd Burdette	6	81–59	.579
12	1952–1956	John Dee	4	68–25	.731
13	1956–1960	Eugene Lambert	4	49–49	.500
14	1960–1968	Hayden Riley	8	102–104	.495
15	1968–1980	C. M. Newton	12	211–123	.632
16	1980–1992	Wimp Sanderson	12	267–119	.692
17	1992–1998	David Hobbs	6	110–76	.591
18	1998–2009	Mark Gottfried	11	216–138	.610
19	2009–2015 (Note: Alabama fired Anthony Grant on March 15, 2015, and named John Brannen as interim coach for the 2015 NIT)	Anthony Grant	6	117–85	.579
–	2015*	John Brannen	1	1–1	.500
20	2015–2019	Avery Johnson	4	75–62	.547
21	2019–present	Nate Oats	7	170–73	.700
Totals		21 coaches	111 seasons	1,847–1,120	.623
Records updated through end of 2025–26 season * - Denotes interim head coach. Source
