= 1951–52 William & Mary Indians men's basketball team =

American college basketball season

1951–52 William & Mary Indians men's basketball
- Conference: Southern Conference
- Record: 15–13 (10–6 SoCon)
- Head coach: H. Lester Hooker (1st season)
- Home arena: Blow Gymnasium

1951–52 Southern Conference men's basketball standings
	Conf.				Overall
Team	W		L	PCT	W		L	PCT
No. 9 West Virginia	15	–	1	.938	23	–	4	.852
North Carolina State †	12	–	2	.857	24	–	10	.706
No. 12 Duke	13	–	3	.813	24	–	6	.800
Clemson	11	–	4	.733	17	–	7	.708
George Washington	12	–	6	.667	15	–	9	.625
Maryland	9	–	5	.643	13	–	9	.591
Furman	9	–	5	.643	18	–	6	.750
William & Mary	10	–	6	.625	15	–	13	.536
South Carolina	8	–	7	.533	14	–	10	.583
Wake Forest	7	–	9	.438	10	–	19	.345
North Carolina	8	–	11	.421	12	–	15	.444
Virginia Tech	3	–	10	.231	4	–	16	.200
Richmond	3	–	11	.214	7	–	15	.318
Washington and Lee	3	–	11	.214	6	–	21	.222
Davidson	4	–	15	.211	7	–	18	.280
VMI	2	–	13	.133	3	–	21	.125
The Citadel	1	–	11	.083	8	–	20	.286
† Southern Conference Tournament winner Rankings from AP Poll

The 1951–52 William & Mary Indians men's basketball team represented the College of William & Mary in intercollegiate basketball during the 1951–52 NCAA men's basketball season. Under the first, and only, year of head coach H. Lester Hooker, the team finished the season 15–13 and 10–6 in the Southern Conference. This was the 47th season of the collegiate basketball program at William & Mary, whose nickname is now the Tribe. William & Mary played its home games at Blow Gymnasium.

The Indians finished in 8th place in the conference and qualified as the #8 seed for the 1952 Southern Conference men's basketball tournament, hosted by North Carolina State University at Reynolds Coliseum in Raleigh, North Carolina, where the Indians lost to #10 West Virginia in the quarterfinals. William & Mary failed to qualify for a post-season tournament.

== Program notes ==
- The Indians played two teams for the first time this season: NYU and Pittsburgh.

== Schedule ==
Date time, TV	Rank^{#}	Opponent^{#}	Result	Record	Site city, state
Regular season
*		at NYU	L 70–85	0–1	New York City, NY
12/3/1951*		at Seton Hall	L 52–63	0–2	Walsh Gymnasium; South Orange, NJ
*		Randolph–Macon	W 61–45	1–2	Blow Gymnasium; Williamsburg, VA
*		Morris Harvey	W 94–46	2–2	Blow Gymnasium; Williamsburg, VA
12/12/1951		at Maryland	L 53–54	2–3 (0–1)	Ritchie Coliseum; College Park, MD
		VMI	W 80–53	3–3 (1–1)	Blow Gymnasium; Williamsburg, VA
12/19/1951*		at Cincinnati	L 61–71	3–4	Cincinnati Gardens; Cincinnati, OH
12/20/1951		at West Virginia	L 66–87	3–5 (1–2)	WVU Field House; Morgantown, WV
*		at Pittsburgh	L 48–63	3–6	Fitzgerald Field House; Pittsburgh, PA
*		Virginia	W 70–59	4–6	Blow Gymnasium; Williamsburg, VA
1/7/1952		Wake Forest	W 97–75	5–6 (2–2)	Blow Gymnasium; Williamsburg, VA
*		Hampden–Sydney	W 75–69	6–6	Blow Gymnasium; Williamsburg, VA
1/12/1952		at NC State	L 46–82	6–7 (2–3)	Reynolds Coliseum; Raleigh, NC
1/14/1952*		No. 15 Louisville	L 65–93	6–8	Blow Gymnasium; Williamsburg, VA
		at Washington and Lee	W 84–82	7–8 (3–3)	Doremus Gymnasium; Lexington, VA
1/19/1952		Richmond	W 86–70	8–8 (4–3)	Blow Gymnasium; Williamsburg, VA
		VPI	W 91–74	9–8 (5–3)	Blow Gymnasium; Williamsburg, VA
2/5/1952		NC State	W 70–61	10–8 (6–3)	Blow Gymnasium; Williamsburg, VA
2/7/1952		at Duke	L 62–68	10–9 (6–4)	Duke Indoor Stadium; Durham, NC
		George Washington	L 68–74	10–10 (6–5)	Blow Gymnasium; Williamsburg, VA
		Washington and Lee	W 89–75	11–10 (7–5)	Blow Gymnasium; Williamsburg, VA
2/16/1952		Maryland	W 71–66	12–10 (8–5)	Blow Gymnasium; Williamsburg, VA
		at VPI	W 86–76	13–10 (9–5)	War Memorial Gymnasium; Blacksburg, VA
2/19/1952		at VMI	W 86–71	14–10 (10–5)	Cormack Field House; Lexington, VA
2/23/1952		at Richmond	L 61–80	14–11 (10–6)	Benedictine High School Gymnasium; Richmond, VA
*		at Virginia	W 87–85	15–11	Memorial Gymnasium; Charlottesville, VA
2/29/1952*		Cincinnati	L 76–82	15–12	Blow Gymnasium; Williamsburg, VA
1952 Southern Conference Tournament
3/6/1952		vs. No. 10 (1) West Virginia; Quarterfinals	L 64–77	15–13	Reynolds Coliseum; Raleigh, NC
*Non-conference game. ^{#}Rankings from AP Poll. (#) Tournament seedings in parentheses.
