= 1952 Southern Conference men's basketball tournament =

- Classification: Division I
- Season: 1951–52
- Teams: 8
- Site: Reynolds Coliseum; Raleigh, NC
- Champions: North Carolina State (7th title)
- Winning coach: Everett Case (6th title)

1951–52 Southern Conference men's basketball standings
	Conf.				Overall
Team	W		L	PCT	W		L	PCT
No. 9 West Virginia	15	–	1	.938	23	–	4	.852
North Carolina State †	12	–	2	.857	24	–	10	.706
No. 12 Duke	13	–	3	.813	24	–	6	.800
Clemson	11	–	4	.733	17	–	7	.708
George Washington	12	–	6	.667	15	–	9	.625
Maryland	9	–	5	.643	13	–	9	.591
Furman	9	–	5	.643	18	–	6	.750
William & Mary	10	–	6	.625	15	–	13	.536
South Carolina	8	–	7	.533	14	–	10	.583
Wake Forest	7	–	9	.438	10	–	19	.345
North Carolina	8	–	11	.421	12	–	15	.444
Virginia Tech	3	–	10	.231	4	–	16	.200
Richmond	3	–	11	.214	7	–	15	.318
Washington and Lee	3	–	11	.214	6	–	21	.222
Davidson	4	–	15	.211	7	–	18	.280
VMI	2	–	13	.133	3	–	21	.125
The Citadel	1	–	11	.083	8	–	20	.286
† Southern Conference Tournament winner Rankings from AP Poll

The 1952 Southern Conference men's basketball tournament took place from March 6–8, 1952 at the Reynolds Coliseum in Raleigh, North Carolina. The North Carolina State Wolfpack, led by head coach Everett Case, won their seventh Southern Conference title and received the automatic berth to the 1952 NCAA tournament.

== Format ==
The top eight finishers of the conference's seventeen members were eligible for the tournament. Teams were seeded based on conference winning percentage. The tournament used a preset bracket consisting of three rounds.

== Bracket ==
Quarterfinals; March 6
1	#10 West Virginia	77
8	William & Mary	64
3	#15 Duke	51
6	Maryland	48
2	NC State	73
7	Furman	68
4	Clemson	65
5	George Washington	78

Semifinals; March 7
1	#10 West Virginia	88
3	#15 Duke	90
2	NC State	76
5	George Washington	64

Finals; March 8
2	NC State	77
3	#15 Duke	68

* Overtime game

== See also ==
- List of Southern Conference men's basketball champions
