= Duke Blue Devils men's basketball statistical leaders =

The Duke Blue Devils basketball statistical leaders are individual statistical leaders of the Duke Blue Devils basketball program in various categories, including points, rebounds, assists, steals, and blocks. Within those areas, the lists identify single-game, single-season, and career leaders. The Blue Devils represent Duke University in the NCAA's Atlantic Coast Conference.

Duke began competing in intercollegiate basketball in 1905. However, the school's record book does not generally list records from before the 1950s, as records from before this period are often incomplete and inconsistent. Since scoring was much lower in this era, and teams played much fewer games during a typical season, it is likely that few or no players from this era would appear on these lists anyway.

The NCAA did not officially record assists as a stat until the 1983–84 season, and blocks and steals until the 1985–86 season, but Duke's record books includes players in these stats before these seasons. These lists are updated through the end of the 2020–21 season.

== Scoring ==
Career
Rk	Player	Points	Seasons
1	JJ Redick	2,769	2002–03 2003–04 2004–05 2005–06
2	Johnny Dawkins	2,556	1982–83 1983–84 1984–85 1985–86
3	Christian Laettner	2,460	1988–89 1989–90 1990–91 1991–92
4	Kyle Singler	2,392	2007–08 2008–09 2009–10 2010–11
5	Mike Gminski	2,323	1976–77 1977–78 1978–79 1979–80
6	Danny Ferry	2,155	1985–86 1986–87 1987–88 1988–89
7	Mark Alarie	2,136	1982–83 1983–84 1984–85 1985–86
8	Gene Banks	2,079	1977–78 1978–79 1979–80 1980–81
	Jason Williams	2,079	1999–00 2000–01 2001–02
10	Jon Scheyer	2,077	2006–07 2007–08 2008–09 2009–10

Season
Rk	Player	Points	Season
1	JJ Redick	964	2005–06
2	RJ Barrett	860	2018–19
3	Cameron Boozer	855	2025–26
4	Jason Williams	841	2000–01
5	Dick Groat	831	1950–51
6	Johnny Dawkins	809	1985–86
7	Danny Ferry	791	1988–89
8	Dick Groat	780	1951–52
9	Grayson Allen	779	2015–16
10	Shane Battier	778	2000–01

Single game
Rk	Player	Points	Season	Opponent
1	Danny Ferry	58	1988–89	Miami
2	Dick Groat	48	1951–52	North Carolina
3	Dick Groat	46	1951–52	George Washington
4	Jeff Mullins	43	1963–64	Villanova
5	Tate Armstrong	42	1975–76	Clemson
	Cooper Flagg	42	2024-25	Notre Dame
7	Bob Verga	41	1966–67	Ohio State
	JJ Redick	41	2005–06	Texas
	JJ Redick	41	2005–06	Georgetown
10	Dick Groat	40	1951–52	South Carolina
	Art Heyman	40	1962–63	North Carolina
	Tate Armstrong	40	1975–76	N.C. State
	JJ Redick	40	2005–06	Virginia

== Rebounds ==
Career
Rk	Player	Rebounds	Seasons
1	Shelden Williams	1,262	2002–03 2003–04 2004–05 2005–06
2	Mike Gminski	1,242	1976–77 1977–78 1978–79 1979–80
3	Christian Laettner	1,149	1988–89 1989–90 1990–91 1991–92
4	Mason Plumlee	1,085	2009–10 2010–11 2011–12 2012–13
5	Randy Denton	1,067	1968–69 1969–70 1970–71
6	Mike Lewis	1,051	1965–66 1966–67 1967–68
7	Kyle Singler	1,015	2007–08 2008–09 2009–10 2010–11
8	Danny Ferry	1,003	1985–86 1986–87 1987–88 1988–89
9	Gene Banks	985	1977–78 1978–79 1979–80 1980–81
10	Ronnie Mayer	954	1952–53 1953–54 1954–55 1955–56

Season
Rk	Player	Rebounds	Season
1	Bernie Janicki	476	1951–52
2	Mike Lewis	402	1967–68
3	Cameron Boozer	389	2025–26
4	Randy Denton	385	1970–71
5	Shelden Williams	384	2005–06
6	Elton Brand	382	1998–99
7	Shelden Williams	369	2004–05
8	Marvin Bagley III	366	2017–18
9	Christian Laettner	364	1989–90
10	Mike Gminski	359	1979–80
	Mason Plumlee	359	2012–13

Single game
Rk	Player	Rebounds	Season	Opponent
1	Bernie Janicki	31	1951–52	North Carolina
2	Randy Denton	25	1970–71	Northwestern
3	Art Heyman	24	1962–63	North Carolina
	Mike Lewis	24	1966–67	Wake Forest
	Paul Schmidt	24	1957–58	Wake Forest
6	Bob Lakata	23	1954–55	Temple
	Jim Newcome	23	1956–57	West Virginia
	Randy Denton	23	1968–69	Davidson
9	Mike Lewis	22	1967–68	NC State
	Mike Lewis	22	1967–68	Temple
	Miles Plumlee	22	2011–12	Maryland

== Assists ==
Career
Rk	Player	Assists	Seasons
1	Bobby Hurley	1,076	1989–90 1990–91 1991–92 1992–93
2	Chris Duhon	819	2000–01 2001–02 2002–03 2003–04
3	Tommy Amaker	708	1983–84 1984–85 1985–86 1986–87
4	Jason Williams	644	1999–00 2000–01 2001–02
5	Quin Snyder	575	1985–86 1986–87 1987–88 1988–89
6	Johnny Dawkins	555	1982–83 1983–84 1984–85 1985–86
7	Quinn Cook	509	2011–12 2012–13 2013–14 2014–15
8	Danny Ferry	506	1985–86 1986–87 1987–88 1988–89
9	Steve Wojciechowski	505	1994–95 1995–96 1996–97 1997–98
10	Greg Paulus	468	2005–06 2006–07 2007–08 2008–09

Season
Rk	Player	Assists	Season
1	Bobby Hurley	289	1990–91
2	Bobby Hurley	288	1989–90
3	Bobby Hurley	262	1992–93
4	Tommy Amaker	241	1985–86
5	Bobby Hurley	237	1991–92
	Jason Williams	237	2000–01
7	Dick Groat	229	1951–52
8	Chris Duhon	225	2003–04
9	Quin Snyder	223	1988–89
10	Jason Williams	220	1999–00

Single game
Rk	Player	Assists	Season	Opponent
1	Bobby Hurley	16	1992–93	Florida State
2	Bobby Hurley	15	1992–93	Oklahoma
	Bobby Hurley	15	1992–93	NC State
	Bobby Hurley	15	1992–93	UCLA
	Greg Paulus	15	2005–06	Valparaiso
6	Kevin Billerman	14	1973–74	North Carolina
	Tommy Amaker	14	1985–86	Miami
	Bobby Hurley	14	1990–91	LSU
	Chris Duhon	14	2003–04	Wake Forest
	Quinn Cook	14	2012–13	Wake Forest

== Steals ==
Career
Rk	Player	Steals	Seasons
1	Chris Duhon	301	2000–01 2001–02 2002–03 2003–04
2	Shane Battier	266	1997–98 1998–99 1999–00 2000–01
3	Tommy Amaker	259	1983–84 1984–85 1985–86 1986–87
4	Jim Spanarkel	253	1975–76 1976–77 1977–78 1978–79
5	Christian Laettner	243	1988–89 1989–90 1990–91 1991–92
6	Jason Williams	235	1999–00 2000–01 2001–02
7	Grant Hill	218	1990–91 1991–92 1992–93 1993–94
8	Jon Scheyer	208	2006–07 2007–08 2008–09 2009–10
9	Steve Wojciechowski	203	1994–95 1995–96 1996–97 1997–98
10	Bobby Hurley	202	1989–90 1990–91 1991–92 1992–93

Season
Rk	Player	Steals	Season
1	Jim Spanarkel	93	1977–78
2	Steve Wojciechowski	82	1996–97
	Shane Battier	82	2000–01
	Chris Duhon	82	2001–02
5	Tommy Amaker	81	1985–86
6	Jason Williams	81	1999–00
7	Mike Dunleavy Jr.	80	2001–02
	Chris Duhon	80	2003–04
9	Jason Williams	78	2000–01
10	Chris Duhon	77	2000–01

Single game
Rk	Player	Steals	Season	Opponent
1	Kenny Dennard	11	1978–79	Maryland
2	Grant Hill	8	1992–93	California
	Steve Wojciechowski	8	1996–97	Vanderbilt
	Quinn Cook	8	2013–14	UCLA
5	George Moses	7	1975–76	Western Kentucky
	George Moses	7	1975–76	Davidson
	Jim Spanarkel	7	1976–77	Lafayette
	Tommy Amaker	7	1985–86	Old Dominion
	Tommy Amaker	7	1985–86	Louisville
	Christian Laettner	7	1991–92	North Carolina
	Shane Battier	7	1997–98	Davidson
	Mike Dunleavy Jr.	7	2001–02	Maryland
	Sean Dockery	7	2003–04	St. John's
	Chris Duhon	7	2003–04	Fairfield
	Chris Duhon	7	2003–04	Georgia Tech
	DeMarcus Nelson	7	2005–06	Boston U.
	David McClure	7	2005–06	UNC Greensboro

== Blocks ==
Career
Rk	Player	Blocks	Seasons
1	Shelden Williams	422	2002–03 2003–04 2004–05 2005–06
2	Mike Gminski	345	1976–77 1977–78 1978–79 1979–80
3	Shane Battier	254	1997–98 1998–99 1999–00 2000–01
4	Cherokee Parks	230	1991–92 1992–93 1993–94 1994–95
5	Mason Plumlee	199	2009–10 2010–11 2011–12 2012–13
6	Christian Laettner	145	1988–89 1989–90 1990–91 1991–92
7	Mark Williams	142	2020–21 2021–22
8	Amile Jefferson	138	2012–13 2013–14 2014–15 2015–16 2016–17
9	Grant Hill	133	1990–91 1991–92 1992–93 1993–94
10	Shavlik Randolph	129	2002–03 2003–04 2004–05

Season
Rk	Player	Blocks	Season
1	Shelden Williams	137	2005–06
2	Shelden Williams	122	2004–05
3	Shelden Williams	111	2003–04
4	Mark Williams	110	2021–22
5	Mike Gminski	97	1979–80
6	Mike Gminski	92	1977–78
7	Mike Gminski	90	1976–77
8	Shane Battier	88	2000–01
9	Elton Brand	86	1998–99
10	Josh McRoberts	82	2006–07
	Dereck Lively II	82	2022–23

Single game
Rk	Player	Blocks	Season	Opponent
1	Cherokee Parks	10	1993–94	Clemson
	Shelden Williams	10	2005–06	Maryland
3	Mike Gminski	9	1976–77	Davidson
	Mike Gminski	9	1977–78	NC State
	Mike Gminski	9	1978–79	Davidson
	Mike Gminski	9	1979–80	Wake Forest
	Shelden Williams	9	2004–05	Virginia
	Shelden Williams	9	2005–06	Davidson
9	Mike Gminski	8	1976–77	Connecticut
	Mike Gminski	8	1979–80	Vermont
	Shane Battier	8	1999–00	Kansas
	Shelden Williams	8	2003–04	Wake Forest
	Shelden Williams	8	2005–06	Virginia
	Mark Williams	8	2021–22	NC State
	Dereck Lively II	8	2022–23	North Carolina
