= 1951–52 La Salle Explorers men's basketball team =

American college basketball season

1951–52 La Salle Explorers men's basketball

National Invitation Tournament, Champions
- Conference: Independent

Ranking
- Coaches: No. 17
- Record: 25–7

The 1951–52 La Salle Explorers men's basketball team represented La Salle University. The Explorers would win the 1952 National Invitation Tournament.

== National Invitation Tournament ==
- First Round
  - La Salle 80, Seton Hall 76
- Quarterfinals
  - La Salle 51, St. John's 45
- Semifinal round
  - La Salle 59, Duquesne 46
- Final
  - La Salle 75, Dayton 64

== Awards and honors ==
- Tom Gola and Norm Grekin, NIT co-Most Valuable Players

== Team players drafted into the NBA ==
Player	NBA club
Newt Jones	Philadelphia Warriors
Bud Donnelly	Syracuse Nationals
