= List of NCAA Division I men's basketball career rebounding leaders =

In basketball, a rebound is the act of gaining possession of the ball after a missed field goal or free throw. The National Collegiate Athletic Association's (NCAA) Division I's top 25 highest rebounders in men's basketball history are listed below. The NCAA did not split into its current divisions format until August 1973. From 1906 to 1955, there were no classifications to the NCAA nor its predecessor, the Intercollegiate Athletic Association of the United States (IAAUS). Then, from 1956 to spring 1973, colleges were classified as either "NCAA University Division (Major College)" or "NCAA College Division (Small College)".

College basketball's all-time leading rebounder is Tom Gola of La Salle. He recorded 2,201 rebounds (while also amassing 2,462 points) between 1951–52 and 1954–55. Gola is also one of seven players in the top 25 who have been enshrined in the Naismith Memorial Basketball Hall of Fame. The others are Bill Russell, Elvin Hayes, Elgin Baylor, Dave DeBusschere, Wes Unseld and Ralph Sampson. Robert Parish of Centenary, also a Hall of Famer, grabbed 1,820 rebounds which would have placed him fifth all-time. However, due to sanctions related to Parish's recruitment, the NCAA omitted all Centenary games and statistics from its official records starting with his freshman year of 1972–73 and continuing through the 1977–78 season, two years after Parish's graduation.

Three teams (Louisville, Wake Forest and Morehead State) each have two players in the top 25 all-time rebounding list. For Louisville, they are Charlie Tyra and Wes Unseld; for Wake Forest they are Dickie Hemric and Tim Duncan; and for Morehead State, they are Steve Hamilton and Kenneth Faried. Only one player, Elgin Baylor, split his college career at two different schools. He spent one season at Albertson College before transferring to Seattle University where he spent the next two years.

== Key ==
Pos.	G	F	C	Ref.
Position	Guard	Forward	Center	References

^	Player still competing in NCAA Division I
*	Inducted into the Naismith Memorial Basketball Hall of Fame
Team (X)	Denotes the number of times a player from that team appears on the list
Italics	Unofficial career total not recognized due to NCAA sanctions
C	Player was active in the 2020–21 season, benefiting from the NCAA's blanket COVID-19 eligibility waiver

== Rebounding leaders ==
=== Top 25 all-time ===
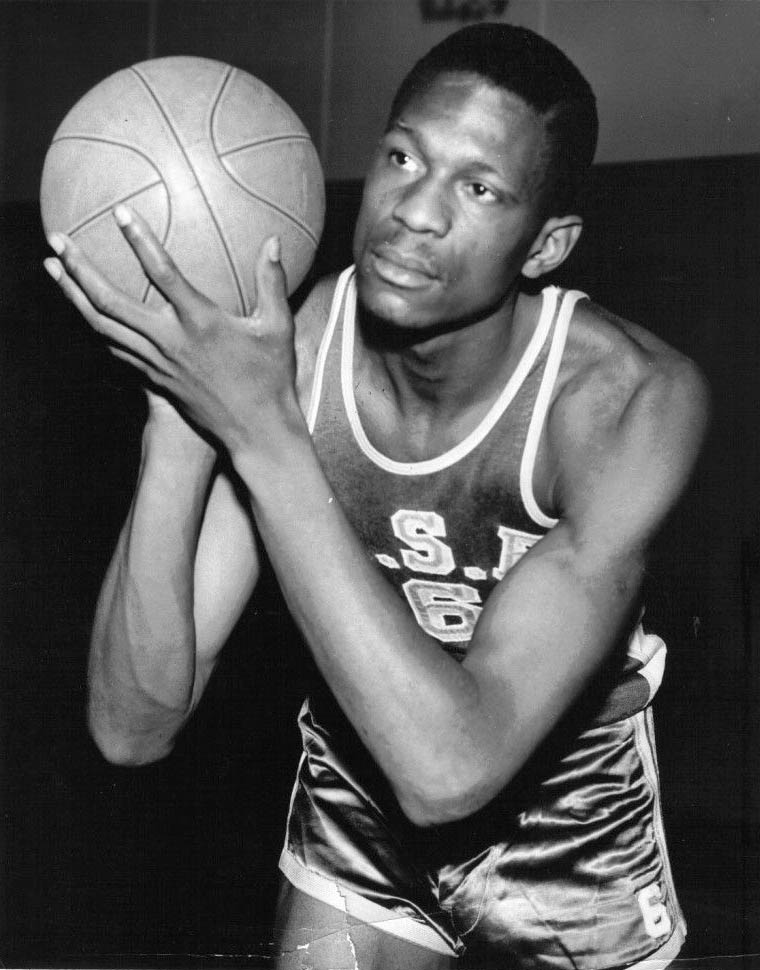
Bill Russell grabbed 1,606 rebounds.

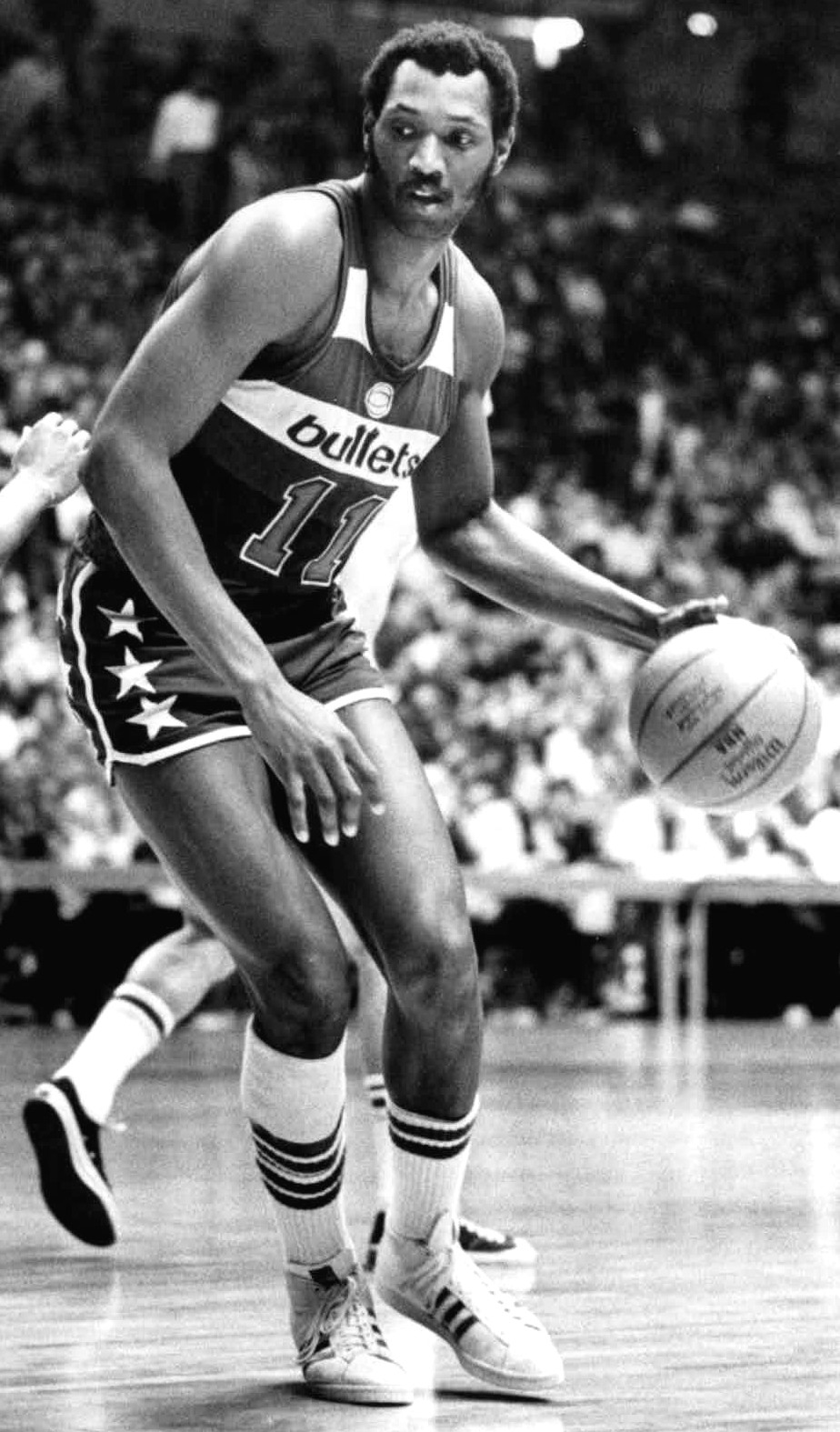
Elvin Hayes grabbed 1,602 rebounds.

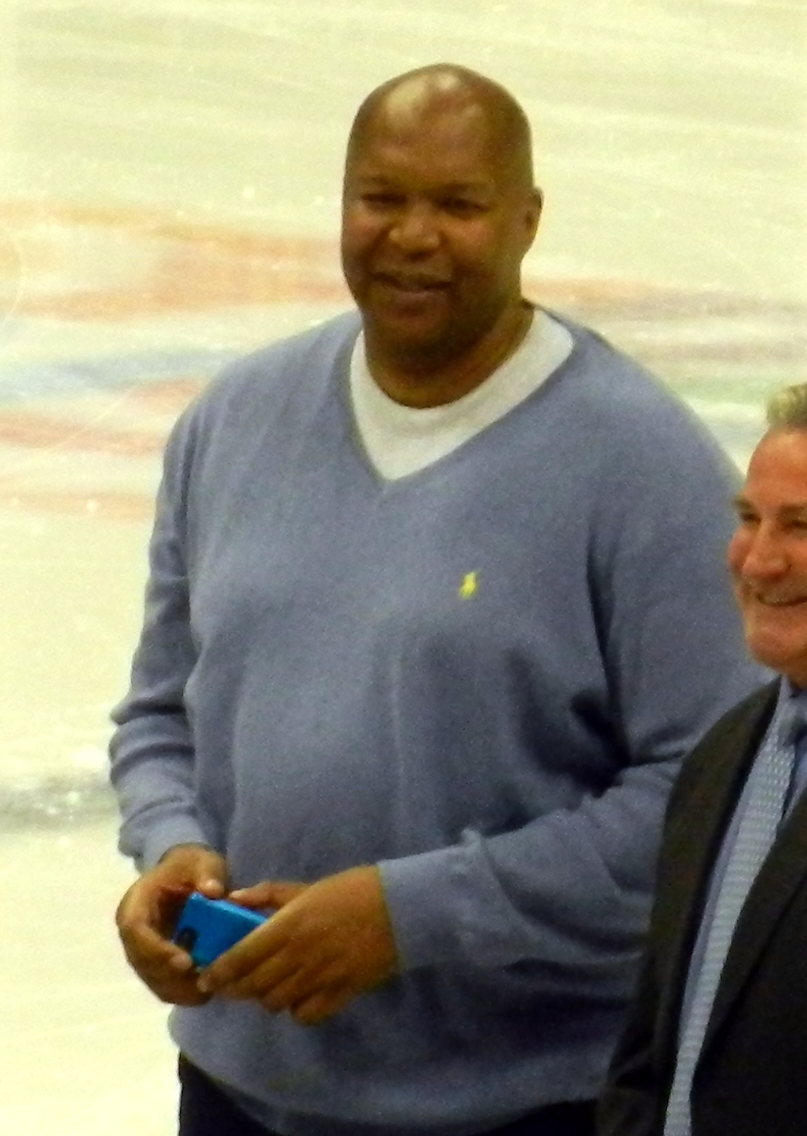
Derrick Coleman grabbed 1,534 rebounds.

Player	Pos.	Team	Career start	Career end	Games played	Rebounds	Ref.
Tom Gola*	F	La Salle	1951	1955	118	2,201	
Joe Holup	F	George Washington	1952	1956	104	2,030	
Charlie Slack	C	Marshall	1952	1956	88	1,916	
Ed Conlin	F	Fordham	1951	1955	102	1,884	
Robert Parish*	C	Centenary	1972	1976	108	1,820	
Dickie Hemric	F/C	Wake Forest	1951	1955	104	1,802	
Paul Silas	C	Creighton	1961	1964	81	1,751	
Art Quimby	C	UConn	1951	1955	80	1,716	
Armando Bacot^{C}	C/F	North Carolina	2019	2024	169	1,715	
Norchad Omier^{C}	F	Arkansas State / Miami (Florida) / Baylor	2020	2025	155	1,694	
Jerry Harper	F/C	Alabama	1952	1956	93	1,688	
Jeff Cohen	F/C	William & Mary	1957	1961	103	1,679	
Steve Hamilton	F/C	Morehead State	1954	1958	102	1,675	
Kenneth Faried	F/C	Morehead State (2)	2007	2011	136	1,673	
Charlie Tyra	F	Louisville	1953	1957	95	1,617	
Bill Russell*	C	San Francisco	1953	1956	79	1,606	
Elvin Hayes*	C	Houston	1965	1968	93	1,602	
Johni Broome^{C}	F/C	Morehead State (3) / Auburn	2020	2025	168	1,594	
Marvin Barnes	F	Providence	1971	1974	89	1,592	
Tim Duncan*	C	Wake Forest (2)	1993	1997	128	1,570	
Ronnie Shavlik	F/C	NC State	1953	1956	93	1,567	
Elgin Baylor*	F	Albertson / Seattle	1954	1958	80	1,559	
Ernie Beck	F	Penn	1950	1953	82	1,557	
Dave DeBusschere*	C	Detroit Mercy	1959	1962	80	1,552	
Wes Unseld*	F/C	Louisville (2)	1965	1968	82	1,551	
Derrick Coleman	F/C	Syracuse	1986	1990	143	1,537	

=== Post-1973 era ===
In the official NCAA men's basketball record book, a distinction is drawn between the pre-1973 era and the post-1973 era. One reason is that because of the split into the three Divisions in use today (Divisions I, II and III), many of the rebounds accumulated in the pre-1973 era were against lesser-talented opponents that would be considered Division II, III or even NAIA in today's classification scheme. Although the 1972–73 season was before the divisional split, the NCAA officially considers that season to be "post-1973" because of the adoption of freshman eligibility for varsity play in all NCAA sports effective in August 1972. Listed below are the top 10 rebounders in NCAA Division I basketball since 1973.

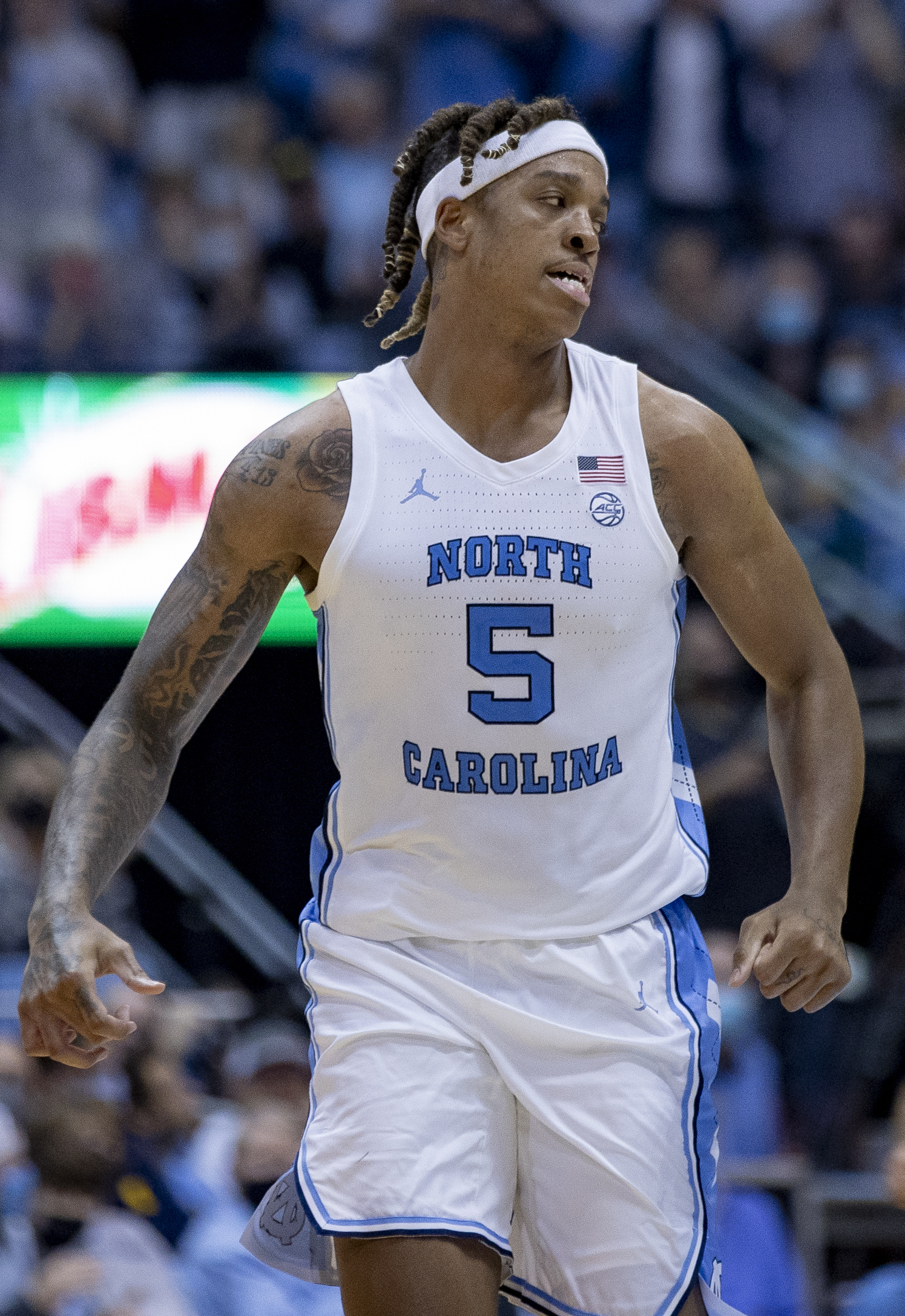
Armando Bacot is the all-time leading rebounder in the post-1973 era.

Player	Pos.	Team	Career start	Career end	Games played	Rebounds	Ref.
Armando Bacot^{C}	C/F	North Carolina	2019	2024	169	1,715	
Norchad Omier^{C}	F	Arkansas State / Miami (Florida) / Baylor	2020	2025	155	1,694	
Kenneth Faried	F/C	Morehead State	2007	2011	136	1,673	
Johni Broome^{C}	F/C	Morehead State (2) / Auburn	2020	2025	168	1,594	
Tim Duncan*	C	Wake Forest	1993	1997	128	1,570	
Derrick Coleman	F/C	Syracuse	1986	1990	143	1,537	
Malik Rose	F	Drexel	1992	1996	120	1,514	
Ralph Sampson*	C	Virginia	1979	1983	132	1,511	
Hunter Dickinson^^{C}	C	Michigan / Kansas	2020	2025	161	1,488	
Pete Padgett	F	Nevada	1972	1976	104	1,464	
