= 1951–52 NCAA men's basketball rankings =

- Season: 1951–52
- NCAA Tournament: 1952
- NCAA Tournament Champions: Kansas
NCAA men's basketball rankings


The 1951–52 NCAA men's basketball rankings was made up of two human polls, the AP Poll and the Coaches Poll.

== Legend ==
	Increase in ranking
	Decrease in ranking
	New to rankings from previous week
Italics	Number of first place votes
(#–#)	Win–loss record
т	Tied with team above or below also with this symbol

== AP Poll ==
	Week 2 Dec. 10	Week 3 Dec. 17	Week 4 Dec. 25	Week 5 Jan. 1	Week 6 Jan. 8	Week 7 Jan. 15	Week 8 Jan. 22	Week 9 Jan. 29	Week 10 Feb. 5	Week 11 Feb. 12	Week 12 Feb. 19	Week 13 Feb. 26	Final Mar. 4	
1.	Kentucky (1–0)	St. John's (5–0)	Kentucky (4–1)	Kansas (10–0)	Kansas (11–0)	Kansas (12–0)	Illinois (11–0)	Kentucky (14–2)	Kentucky (18–2)	Kentucky (21–2)	Kentucky (22–2)	Kentucky (24–2)	Kentucky (28–2)	1.
2.	St. John's (3–0)	Kentucky (2–1)	Illinois (5–0)	Illinois (6–0)	Illinois (8–0)	Illinois (10–0)	Kansas (13–0)	Kansas State (13–3)	Kansas State (13–3)	Kansas State (15–3)	Kansas State (16–3)	Illinois (17–2)	Illinois (19–2)	2.
3.	Illinois (1–0)	Illinois (2–0)	Washington (7–1)	Washington (10–1)	Kentucky (8–2)	Kentucky (10–2)	Kentucky (12–2)	Illinois (11–1)	Illinois (13–1)	Duquesne (16–0)	Duquesne (17–0)	Kansas State (16–3)	Kansas State (18–4)	3.
4.	Saint Louis (1–0)	Saint Louis (3–1)	Kansas (7–0)	Kentucky (6–2)	Indiana (8–0)	Iowa (10–0)	Iowa (12–0)	Kansas (13–1)	St. Bonaventure (13–0)	St. Bonaventure (16–0)	Iowa (16–1)	Duquesne (19–1)	Duquesne (21–1)	4.
5.	Kansas State (3–0)	Kansas State (5–1)	Indiana (5–0)	Indiana (7–0)	Saint Louis (9–2)	Saint Louis (10–3)	St. Bonaventure (10–0)	St. Bonaventure (12–4)	Duquesne (15–0)	Iowa (14–1)	Illinois (15–2)	Saint Louis (19–6)	Saint Louis (20–7)	5.
6.	Washington (1–1)	Indiana (4–0)	NYU (11–0)	NYU (12–0)	Washington (10–2)	St. Bonaventure (10–0)	Washington (14–2)	Saint Louis (12–4)	Kansas (14–2)	Illinois (13–2)	Washington (21–3)	Washington (22–4)	Washington (24–4)	6.
7.	Seton Hall (4–0)	Kansas (5–0)	St. John's (6–1)	Saint Louis (7–2)	Kansas State (9–3)	Duquesne (10–0)	Kansas State (12–3)	Duquesne (11–0)	Saint Louis (15–5)	Saint Louis (16–6)	Kansas (17–2)	Iowa (18–2)	Iowa (19–3)	7.
8.	Kansas (2–0)	Washington (5–1)	Kansas State (6–2)	St. John's (8–1)	St. Bonaventure (7–0)	Washington (12–2)	Saint Louis (11–4)	Iowa (12–1)	Washington (17–3)	Washington (19–3)	St. John's (18–2)	Kansas (19–2)	Kansas (20–2)	8.
9.	La Salle (4–0)	NC State (4–1)	Notre Dame (6–0)	Kansas State (8–3)	Seton Hall (10–0)	Kansas State (10–3)	West Virginia (11–1)	Washington (15–3)	Iowa (13–1)	Kansas (15–2)	Saint Louis (17–6)	St. John's (20–3)	West Virginia (22–3)	9.
10.	NC State (3–0)	Seton Hall (5–0)	Seton Hall (6–0)	St. Bonaventure (6–0)	Iowa (8–0)	West Virginia (9–1)	Duquesne (11–0)	West Virginia (12–1)	St. John's (13–2)	St. John's (17–2)	St. Bonaventure (17–2)	West Virginia (21–2)	St. John's (21–3)	10.
11.	Indiana (3–0)	NYU (10–0)	Western Kentucky (8–0)	Seton Hall (7–0)	West Virginia (8–1)	Siena (12–2)	Holy Cross (11–2)	Seton Hall (15–1)	Dayton (17–2)	Dayton (18–2)	Dayton (21–2)	Dayton (23–2)	Dayton (24–2)	11.
12.	Duke (4–0)	La Salle (5–0)	Saint Louis (4–2)	Iowa (7–0)	St. John's (9–1)	Seton Hall (12–1)	TCU (14–1)	Louisville (15–2)	West Virginia (14–2)	Seton Hall (18–1)	West Virginia (19–2)	St. Bonaventure (18–3)	Duke (22–5)	12.
13.	Oklahoma A&M (1–0)	Oklahoma A&M (4–0)	Stanford (9–1)	La Salle (7–0)	NYU (13–1)	Louisville (11–2)	Seton Hall (14–1)	Indiana (10–3)	Louisville (16–2)	Oklahoma City (13–4)	Penn State (17–1)	Louisville (19–4)	Holy Cross (21–3)	13.
14.	Notre Dame (3–0)	Wyoming (4–1)	Villanova (5–0)	Notre Dame (7–1)	Syracuse (6–0)	Indiana (8–2)	Louisville (14–2)	Dayton (16–2)	Penn State (13–1)	West Virginia (15–2)	Seton Hall (21–1)	Seton Hall (22–2)	Seton Hall (25–2)	14.
15.	Villanova (2–0)	Minnesota (2–2)	Utah (9–1)	Oklahoma City (7–1)	Louisville (9–2)	La Salle (10–1)	St. John's (12–2)	St. John's (13–2)	Oklahoma City (13–4)	Louisville (17–3)	Louisville (18–4)	Duke (20–5)	St. Bonaventure (19–3)	15.
16.	Stanford (3–0)	Western Kentucky (6–0)	UCLA (5–2)	Murray State (10–0)	Duquesne (8–0)	TCU (14–1)	Dayton (14–2)	Oklahoma City (10–4)	Oklahoma A&M (12–4)	Siena (14–3)	Seattle (26–5)	Wyoming (23–5)	Wyoming (23–6)	16.
17.	Louisville (3–0)	Holy Cross (3–0)	La Salle (6–0)	NC State (8–2)	Siena (12–2)	NC State (11–3)	Utah (16–4)	Holy Cross (11–2)	Seton Hall (17–1)	Penn State (15–1)	Holy Cross (17–2)	Holy Cross (19–2)	Louisville (20–5)	17.
18.	Vanderbilt (3–0)	Villanova (3–0)	Murray State (10–0)	Utah (11–2)	Oklahoma City (7–2)	Oklahoma City (9–3)	La Salle (12–1)	Siena (13–3)	Indiana (10–4)	DePaul (18–4)	Siena (16–3)	Western Kentucky (23–4)	Seattle (29–7)	18.
19.	Eastern Kentucky (4–0)	Duke (5–1)	NC State (5–2)	Syracuse (5–0)	Michigan State (6–0)	Dayton (12–2)	Siena (12–3)	DePaul (15–4)	La Salle (14–2)	Holy Cross (14–2)	Wyoming (21–4)	Villanova (16–7)	UCLA (17–9)	19.
20.	NYU (7–0)	Notre Dame (4–0)	Syracuse (5–0)	Michigan State (6–0)	Dayton (10–2)	Holy Cross (8–1)	Indiana (9–3)	Fordham (12–2)	Western Kentucky (15–3)	Indiana (10–4)	La Salle (18–4)	Siena (18–4)	Texas State (24–0)	20.
	Week 2 Dec. 10	Week 3 Dec. 17	Week 4 Dec. 25	Week 5 Jan. 1	Week 6 Jan. 8	Week 7 Jan. 15	Week 8 Jan. 22	Week 9 Jan. 29	Week 10 Feb. 5	Week 11 Feb. 12	Week 12 Feb. 19	Week 13 Feb. 26	Final Mar. 4	
		Dropped: Stanford; Louisville; Vanderbilt; Eastern Kentucky	Dropped: Oklahoma A&M (5–1); Wyoming (6–2); Minnesota; Holy Cross; Duke	Dropped: Western Kentucky; Stanford (11–1); Villanova; UCLA (7–4)	Dropped: La Salle; Notre Dame; Murray State; NC State; Utah	Dropped: St. John's (10–2); NYU (15–1); Syracuse; Michigan State	Dropped: NC State (11–5); Oklahoma City	Dropped: TCU; Utah; La Salle	Dropped: Holy Cross; Siena; DePaul; Fordham	Dropped: Oklahoma A&M; La Salle; Western Kentucky	Dropped: Oklahoma City; DePaul; Indiana (12–5)	Dropped: Penn State; Seattle; La Salle (18–5)	Dropped: Western Kentucky (24–4); Villanova (17–8); Siena (19–5)	

== UP Poll ==
	Week 1 Dec. 6	Week 2 Dec. 10	Week 3 Dec. 17	Week 4 Dec. 25	Week 5 Jan. 1	Week 6 Jan. 8	Week 7 Jan. 15	Week 8 Jan. 22	Week 9 Jan. 29	Week 10 Feb. 5	Week 11 Feb. 12	Week 12 Feb. 19	Week 13 Feb. 26	Week 14 Mar. 4	Final Mar. 11	
1.	Kentucky (0–0)	Kentucky (1–0)	Illinois (2–0)	Illinois (5–0)	Illinois (6–0)	Illinois (8–0)	Illinois (10–0)	Illinois (11–0)	Illinois (11–1)	Kentucky (18–2)	Kentucky (21–2)	Kentucky (22–2)	Kentucky (24–2)	Kentucky (28–2)	Kentucky (28–2)	1.
2.	Illinois (0–0)	Illinois (1–0)	St. John's (5–0)	Kentucky (4–1)	Kentucky (6–2)	Kansas (11–0)	Kansas (12–0)	Kansas (13–0)	Kentucky (14–2)	Illinois (13–1)	Kansas State (15–3)	Kansas State (16–3)	Illinois (17–2)	Illinois (19–2)	Illinois (19–3)	2.
3.	Washington (1–1)	St. John's (3–0)	Kentucky (2–1)	Kansas (7–0)	Kansas (10–0)	Kentucky (8–2)	Kentucky (10–2)	Kentucky (12–2)	Kansas State (13–3)	Kansas State (13–3)	Illinois (13–2)	Illinois (15–2)	Kansas State (16–3)	Kansas State (18–4)	Kansas (21–2)	3.
4.	Oklahoma A&M (0–0)	Washington (1–1)	Kansas (5–0)	Washington (7–1)	Indiana (7–0)	Indiana (8–0)	Washington (12–2)	Iowa (12–0)	Kansas (13–1)	Saint Louis (15–5)	Iowa (14–1)	Duquesne (17–0)	Duquesne (19–1)	Kansas (20–2)	Duquesne (21–1)	4.
5.	St. John's (0–0)	Kansas State (3–0)	Washington (5–1)	Indiana (5–0)	Washington (10–1)	Saint Louis (9–2)	Saint Louis (10–3)	Washington (14–2)	St. Bonaventure (12–0)	St. Bonaventure (13–0)	St. Bonaventure (16–0)	Iowa (16–1)	Kansas (19–2)	Duquesne (21–1)	Washington (25–6)	5.
6.	Saint Louis (0–0)	Saint Louis (1–0)	Saint Louis (3–1)	Kansas State (6–2)	Saint Louis (7–2)	Washington (10–2)	Iowa (10–0)	Kansas State (12–3)	Saint Louis (12–4)	Kansas (14–2)	Duquesne (16–0)	Washington (21–3)	Saint Louis (19–6)	Saint Louis (20–7)	Kansas State (18–5)	6.
7.	NC State (3–0)	Oklahoma A&M (1–0)	Kansas State (5–1)	NYU (11–0)	NYU (12–0)	Kansas State (9–3)	Kansas State (10–3)	Saint Louis (11–4)	Washington (15–3)	Washington (17–3)	Saint Louis (16–6)	Kansas (17–2)	Washington (22–4)	Washington (24–4)	Saint Louis (21–7)	7.
8.	Kansas (1–0)	Kansas (2–0)	Indiana (4–0)	St. John's (6–1)	Kansas State (8–3)	St. John's (9–1)	Indiana (8–2)	St. Bonaventure (10–0)	Iowa (12–1)	Duquesne (15–0)	Kansas (15–2)	Saint Louis (17–6)	St. John's (20–3)	Iowa (19–3)	Iowa (19–3)	8.
9.	Wyoming (1–0)	NC State (3–0)	Oklahoma A&M (4–0)	Saint Louis (4–2)	St. John's (8–1)	NYU (13–1)	St. Bonaventure (9–0)	Duquesne (11–0)	Duquesne (11–0)	Iowa (13–1)	Washington (19–3)	St. John's (18–2)	Iowa (18–2)	St. John's (21–3)	St. John's (22–3)	9.
10.	Kansas State (2–0)	Wyoming (3–0)	NC State (4–1)	Utah (9–1)	NC State (8–2)	Iowa (8–0)	Duquesne (10–0)	Indiana (9–3)	Indiana (10–3)	Oklahoma A&M (12–4)	St. John's (17–2)	St. Bonaventure (17–2)	Wyoming (23–5)	Wyoming (23–6)	Wyoming (27–6)	10.
11.	Indiana (1–0)	Indiana (2–0)	Utah (7–1)	Oklahoma A&M (5–1)	Utah (11–2)	NC State (9–3)	St. John's (10–2)	Oklahoma A&M (11–2)	Seton Hall (15–1)	Seton Hall (17–1)	Indiana (10–4)	Wyoming (21–4)	St. Bonaventure (18–3)	St. Bonaventure (19–3)	St. Bonaventure (19–5)	11.
12.	BYU (1–2)	La Salle (4–0)	Notre Dame (4–0)	Notre Dame (6–0)	Villanova (5–1)	St. Bonaventure (7–0)	NC State (11–3)	Holy Cross (11–2)	West Virginia (12–1)	St. John's (13–2) т	Wyoming (20–4)	Seton Hall (21–1)	West Virginia (21–2)	Seton Hall (25–2)	Seton Hall (25–3)	12.
13.	UCLA (1–0)	Villanova (2–0)	Wyoming (4–1)	Stanford (9–1)	Iowa (7–0)	Louisville (9–2)	Seton Hall (12–1)	Louisville (14–2)	NC State (13–5)	Louisville (16–2) т	Dayton (18–2)	West Virginia (19–2)	Seton Hall (22–2)	Louisville (20–5)	TCU (21–3)	13.
14.	Dayton (3–0)	Notre Dame (3–0) т	NYU (10–0)	Iowa (3–0)	Seton Hall (7–0)	Utah (13–3)	Oklahoma A&M (10–2)	TCU (14–1)	Louisville (14–2) т	West Virginia (14–2)	Seton Hall (18–1)	Dayton (21–2) т	Indiana (13–6)	Dayton (24–2) т	West Virginia (23–4)	14.
15.	Seton Hall (3–0)	Louisville (3–0) т	Seton Hall (5–0)	Syracuse (5–0)	Notre Dame (7–1)	Syracuse (6–0)	NYU (15–1)	Seton Hall (14–1)	DePaul (15–4) т	Wyoming (19–4)	Louisville (17–3)	Louisville (18–4) т	Louisville (19–4)	TCU (21–3) т	Holy Cross (24–3)	15.
16.	La Salle (3–0)	UCLA (1–2)	Western Kentucky (6–0)	NC State (5–2)	St. Bonaventure (6–0)	Seton Hall (10–0)	La Salle (10–1)	St. John's (12–2)	Oklahoma City (10–4)	NC State (16–7)	NC State (16–7)	Indiana (12–5) т	Dayton (23–2)	Western Kentucky (24–4) т	Western Kentucky (26–4)	16.
17.	Villanova (0–0)	Seton Hall (4–0)	La Salle (5–0) т	Seton Hall (6–0)	Oklahoma City (7–1)	Minnesota (5–4)	Louisville (11–2)	West Virginia (11–5) т	Wyoming (16–4)	DePaul (16–4)	Oklahoma City (13–4)	TCU (17–3)	Western Kentucky (23–4)	Villanova (17–8) т	La Salle (21–5)	17.
18.	Columbia (2–0)	NYU (7–0) т	Minnesota (2–2) т	Western Kentucky (8–0)	Minnesota (4–3) т	Notre Dame (7–3)	Wyoming (12–3)	NC State (11–5) т	St. John's (13–2)	Oklahoma City (12–4)	West Virginia (15–2)	NC State (17–8)	La Salle (18–5)	West Virginia (22–3) т	Dayton (25–2)	18.
19.	Holy Cross (0–0)	Western Kentucky (4–0) т	Villanova (3–0)	Wyoming (6–2)	Duquesne (5–0) т	Oklahoma A&M (8–2)	TCU (14–1)	NYU (16–1) т	La Salle (13–2) т	Indiana (10–4)	NYU (17–1)	NYU (18–1)	Minnesota (15–6) т	Holy Cross (21–3) т	Louisville (21–5) т	19.
20.	Texas A&M (0–1)	Dayton (4–0)	Iowa (3–0)	La Salle (6–0); St. Bonaventure (4–0)	Louisville (7–1) т Arkansas (5–1) т	West Virginia (8–1)	West Virginia (9–1)	Villanova (9–3) т	Notre Dame (11–4) т	Dayton (17–2) т Western Kentucky (15–3) т	DePaul (18–4)	Villanova (14–7)	NYU (19–1) т	Indiana (15–6)	UCLA (19–10) т Indiana (16–6) т	20.
	Week 1 Dec. 6	Week 2 Dec. 10	Week 3 Dec. 17	Week 4 Dec. 25	Week 5 Jan. 1	Week 6 Jan. 8	Week 7 Jan. 15	Week 8 Jan. 22	Week 9 Jan. 29	Week 10 Feb. 5	Week 11 Feb. 12	Week 12 Feb. 19	Week 13 Feb. 26	Week 14 Mar. 4	Final Mar. 11	
		Dropped: BYU; Columbia; Holy Cross; Texas A&M	Dropped: Louisville; UCLA; Dayton	Dropped: Minnesota; Villanova	Dropped: Oklahoma A&M; Stanford (11–1); Syracuse; Western Kentucky; Wyoming; La Salle	Dropped: Villanova; Oklahoma City; Duquesne; Arkansas	Dropped: Utah; Minnesota; Notre Dame	Dropped: La Salle; Wyoming	Dropped: Oklahoma A&M; Holy Cross; TCU; NYU; Villanova	Dropped: La Salle; Notre Dame	Dropped: Oklahoma A&M; Western Kentucky	Dropped: Oklahoma City; DePaul	Dropped: TCU; NC State; Villanova	Dropped: La Salle; Minnesota; NYU	Dropped: Villanova	
