= Aaric Murray =

American basketball player (born 1989)

Personal information
- Born: July 3, 1989 (age 37) Philadelphia, Pennsylvania, U.S.
- Listed height: 6 ft 10 in (2.08 m)
- Listed weight: 245 lb (111 kg)

Career information
- High school: Glen Mills (Glen Mills, Pennsylvania)
- College: La Salle (2009–2011); West Virginia (2012–2013); Texas Southern (2013–2014)
- NBA draft: 2014: undrafted
- Position: Power forward / center

Career history
- 2014: Panelefsiniakos

Career highlights
- SWAC Player of the Year (2014); First-team All-SWAC (2014)

Aaric Murray (born July 3, 1989) is an American former professional basketball player who spent his brief career playing for Panelefsiniakos of the Greek Basket League. Murray played college basketball for the Texas Southern, as well as La Salle and West Virginia. Murray was named the Southwestern Athletic Conference Player of the Year in 2014.

== Early life ==
Murray was brought up in North Philadelphia. He didn't begin playing basketball until relatively late, since he didn't want to be made fun of for his height and not knowing how to play the game. Murray was sent to the Glen Mills School, a school for court-adjudicated children, due to being frequently truant. He was the number 31 overall prospect in the class of 2009 according to Scout.com.

== College career ==
Murray started his collegiate career at La Salle. Despite only being able to read at an elementary level, he was given a chance with Explorers coach John Giannini. "I just had a little attitude problem, I guess," Murray said. "I was young or something, and I didn't know how to read." As a sophomore, Murray averaged 15.2 points and 7.7 rebounds. Giannini forced Murray to transfer after his sophomore year.

Murray opted to transfer to West Virginia. During his redshirt year, he was arrested for possession of a crack cocaine pipe. He was also suspended in 2012 by coach Bob Huggins for multiple disciplinary violations. In his junior year, Murray averaged 8.8 points, 5.9 rebounds and 1.5 blocks on a 13-19 Mountaineers team. Murray acknowledged that he partied too much and got into trouble at West Virginia. After the season, he decided to transfer again, this time to Texas Southern. where he was arrested again for possession of crack cocaine.

At Texas Southern, Murray worked out with John Lucas. Lucas recalled that Murray at first resisted his training regimen, but eventually came to accept it. On December 18, 2013, Murray scored 48 points against Temple in a one-point upset at the Liacouras Center, setting records for the most points scored against Temple by one player as well as a new arena record. He was named the Southwestern Athletic Conference Player of the Year in 2014. He also picked up SWAC Defensive Player of the Year honors after averaging 21 points and almost 8 rebounds a game on a team that captured the automatic bid to the NCAA tournament.

== Professional career ==
Following a lengthy collegiate career, Murray signed with Panelefsiniakos of the Greek Basket League.
