= 1951–52 Seattle Chieftains men's basketball team =

American college basketball season

1951–52 Seattle Redhawks men's basketball

NIT, First round
- Conference: Independent

Ranking
- AP: No. 18
- Record: 29-7
- Head coach: Al Brightman

The 1951–52 Seattle Chieftains men's basketball team (now known as Redhawks) represented Seattle University.

== National Invitation Tournament (NIT) ==
- First Round
  - Holy Cross 77, Seattle 72

== Harlem Globetrotters ==
On January 21, 1952, the Harlem Globetrotters played Seattle in a game designed to raise funds for the United States Olympic efforts. Five days before the game was held, Royal Brougham received a call from Howard Hobson, who was the Yale basketball coach and a United States Olympic Committee member. It was reported that money was needed to support the country's Olympic effort for the games held in Helsinki, Finland. The Globetrotters had agreed to a three-game fund-raiser against college teams in the West, Midwest and East.

Tickets cost $1.50 and they were sold out in 48 hours. Jazz great Louis Armstrong played at halftime and actress Joan Caulfield performed a ceremonial opening tip off. The game was played at the University of Washington's Hec Edmondson Pavilion and was filled to its 12,500 capacity.

The Globetrotters were considered the best basketball team in the world and the club paid their two star players "Goose" Tatum and Marques Hayes twenty five thousand dollars each. Entering the game with Seattle, the Globetrotters had played 3571 games winning 93 percent of their contests.

Seattle player Johnny O'Brien was the nation's leading scorer at that time. O'Brien would become the first player in the history of college basketball to score 1000 points in a single season. He would finish the season with 1,051 points. Against the Globetrotters, O'Brien poured in 43 points. Johnny's brother Eddie played point guard for Chieftains and his half court shot lifted the club to a 10-point lead.

After halftime, the Globetrotters got back in the game as Johnny O'Brien sat out most of the third quarter. With seconds left in the game, the Globetrotters called a time out they did not have. A free throw was made by Johnny O'Brien and there was a possession change. The Chieftains were ahead 84-81. Globetrotter owner Abe Saperstein was so upset that he canceled the rest of the Trotters benefit schedule that year.
