= Floyd Burdette =

American college basketball coach (1914–1995)

Biographical details
- Born: September 5, 1914; Martin, Tennessee, U.S.
- Died: December 1, 1995 (aged 81); Martin, Tennessee, U.S.
- Education: Murray State; Oklahoma A&M

Playing career
- 1935: UT–Martin
- 1936–1938: Murray State
- 1943–1944: Oklahoma A&M
- Position: Center

Coaching career (HC unless noted)
- 1939–1940: Oklahoma A&M (assistant)
- 1946–1952: Alabama
- 1952–1971: UT–Martin

Head coaching record
- Overall: 278–260

Floyd B. Burdette (September 5, 1914 – December 1, 1995) was a head coach for both the Alabama and Tennessee–Martin Skyhawks men's basketball teams. Born in Martin, Tennessee, Burdette played college basketball for one season at UT Junior College and three at Murray State University from 1935 to 1938. In all four season he competed, Burdette led his team in scoring and was an all-conference selection. He then attended Oklahoma A&M where he both coached and played in 1944 before he began his head coaching career.

== Early life ==
Burdette was born at Martin, Tennessee on September 5, 1914. He attended UT Junior College (now known as the University of Tennessee at Martin) in 1935 where he was a member of the basketball team. Burdette led the Mississippi Valley Conference in scoring and was a selection to the all-conference squad, but transferred to Murray State University after the season. As a member of the Racers squad for the 1936, 1937 and 1938 seasons, Burdette was both their leading scorer and was selected All-SIAA in each season.

After he graduated from Murray State, Burdette went to graduate school at Oklahoma A&M (now known as Oklahoma State University) in 1939. As he pursued his master's degree in physical education, Burdette coached the Cowboys freshman team. He then played for the Oklahoma City 89ers AAU basketball team in Oklahoma City before he returned to Oklahoma A&M to head the school's air crew training program during World War II. As a result of changes to eligibility requirements for participation in intercollegiate athletics due to the war, Burdette played for Henry Iba as a center on the 1943–44 Oklahoma A&M basketball squad.

== Coaching career ==
Burdette served as head men's basketball coach at Alabama from 1946 through 1952. During his six-season tenure with the Crimson Tide, he amassed an overall record of 81 wins and 59 losses (81–59). After he left Alabama, Burdette returned to his hometown and coached at the University of Tennessee at Martin from 1952 to 1971. During his nineteen-year tenure with the Pacers, he amassed an overall record of 197 wins and 201 losses (197–201) and the 1970 Volunteer State Athletic Conference championship.

=== Head coaching record ===
Record table
Season	Coach	Overall	Conference	Standing	Postseason
Alabama Crimson Tide (Southeastern Conference) (1946–1952)
1946–47	Alabama	16–6	13–5	4th	
1947–48	Alabama	15–12	8–8	4th	
1948–49	Alabama	13–12	9–9	6th	
1949–50	Alabama	9–12	8–9	5th	
1950–51	Alabama	15–8	10–4	2nd	
1951–52	Alabama	13–9	9–5	2nd	
Alabama:		81–59	57–40		
Tennessee–Martin Skyhawks (Independent) (1952–1960)
1952–53	Tennessee–Martin	7–9			
1953–54	Tennessee–Martin	15–3			
1954–55	Tennessee–Martin	14–4			
1955–56	Tennessee–Martin	13–6			
1956–57	Tennessee–Martin	7–13			
1957–58	Tennessee–Martin	8–2			
1958–59	Tennessee–Martin	9–13			
1959–60	Tennessee–Martin	10–9			
Tennessee–Martin Skyhawks (Volunteer State Athletic Conference) (1960–1971)
1960–61	Tennessee–Martin	13–10	7–5		
1961–62	Tennessee–Martin	13–11	8–6		
1962–63	Tennessee–Martin	12–12	6–4		
1963–64	Tennessee–Martin	11–10	8–4		
1964–65	Tennessee–Martin	11–13	6–6		
1965–66	Tennessee–Martin	12–8	7–2		
1966–67	Tennessee–Martin	11–13	6–1		
1967–68	Tennessee–Martin	3–18	3–7		
1968–69	Tennessee–Martin	8–12	5–5		
1969–70	Tennessee–Martin	14–12	6–4		
1970–71	Tennessee–Martin	3–20	0–9		
Tennessee–Martin:		197–201	62–53		
Total:		278–260			
National champion Postseason invitational champion Conference regular season champion Conference regular season and conference tournament champion Division regular season champion Division regular season and conference tournament champion Conference tournament champion
