= 1952 National Invitation Tournament =

United States college basketball tournament

- Season: 1951–52
- Teams: 12
- Finals site: Madison Square Garden, New York City
- Champions: La Salle Explorers (1st title)
- Runner-up: Dayton Flyers (2nd title game)
- Semifinalists: St. Bonaventure Bonnies (1st semifinal); Duquesne Dukes (3rd semifinal)
- Winning coach: Ken Loeffler (1st title)
- MVP: Tom Gola and Norm Grekin (La Salle)

The 1952 National Invitation Tournament was the 1952 edition of the annual NCAA college basketball competition. The 1952 tournament was won by La Salle University. Tom Gola and Norm Grekin were co-MVPs.

== Selected teams ==
Below is a list of the 12 teams selected for the tournament.

- Dayton
- Duquesne
- Holy Cross
- La Salle
- Louisville
- NYU
- St. Bonaventure
- St. John's
- Saint Louis
- Seattle
- Seton Hall
- Western Kentucky

== Bracket ==
Below is the tournament bracket.

First round
Western Kentucky	62
Louisville	59
Dayton	81
NYU	66
La Salle	80
Seton Hall	76
Holy Cross	77
Seattle	72

Quarterfinals
Western Kentucky	69
St. Bonaventure	70
Saint Louis	58
Dayton	68
La Salle	51
St. John's	45
Duquesne	78
Holy Cross	68

Semifinals
St. Bonaventure	62
Dayton	69
La Salle	59
Duquesne	46

Finals
Dayton	64
La Salle	75

Third place game
St. Bonaventure	48
Duquesne	34

== See also ==
- 1952 NCAA basketball tournament
- 1952 NAIA Basketball Tournament
