= 1951–52 Duke Blue Devils men's basketball team =

American college basketball season

1951–52 Duke Blue Devils men's basketball

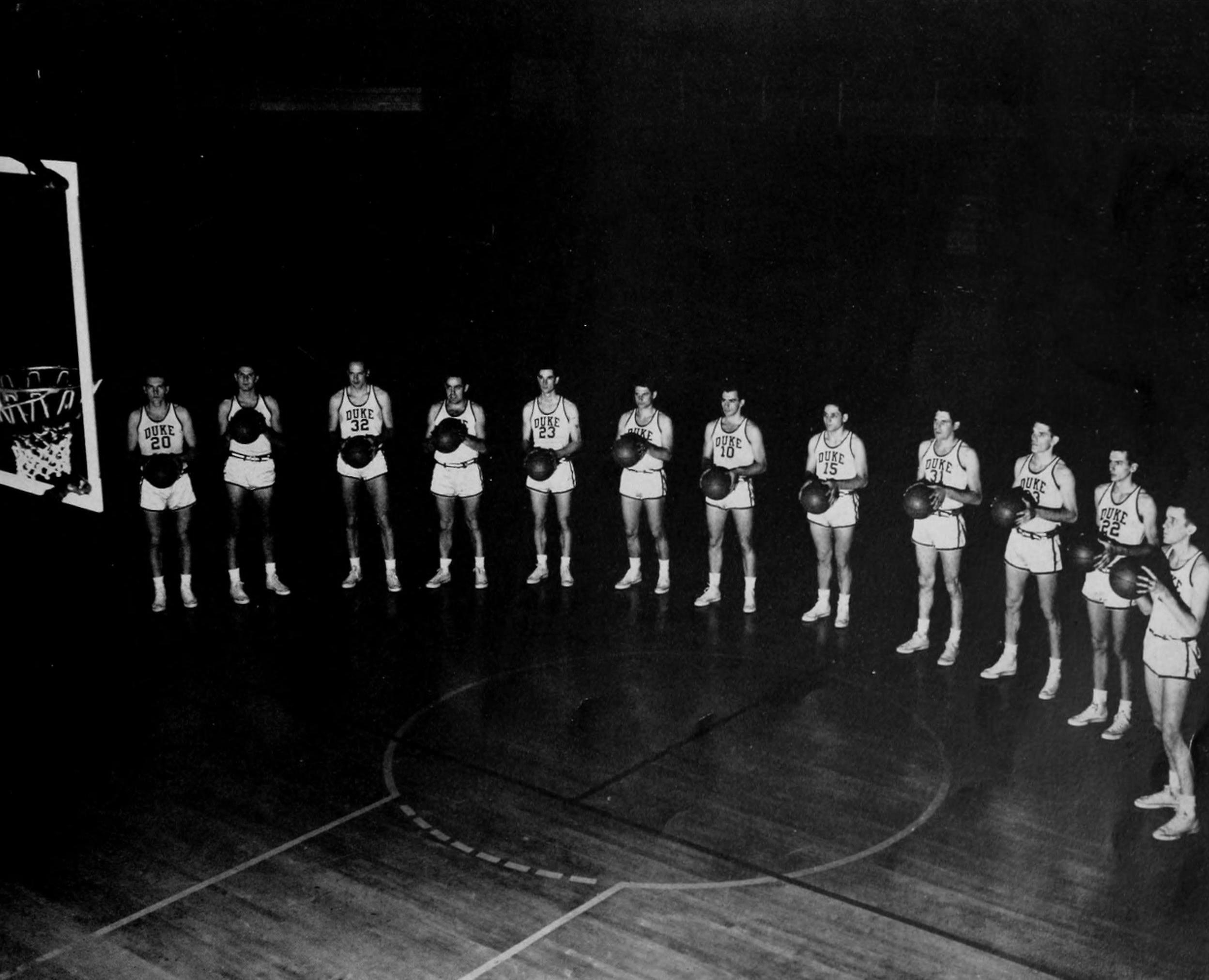
- Conference: Southern Conference

Ranking
- AP: No. 12
- Record: 24–6 (13–3 Southern)
- Head coach: Harold Bradley
- Home arena: Duke Indoor Stadium

1951–52 Southern Conference men's basketball standings
	Conf.				Overall
Team	W		L	PCT	W		L	PCT
No. 9 West Virginia	15	–	1	.938	23	–	4	.852
North Carolina State †	12	–	2	.857	24	–	10	.706
No. 12 Duke	13	–	3	.813	24	–	6	.800
Clemson	11	–	4	.733	17	–	7	.708
George Washington	12	–	6	.667	15	–	9	.625
Maryland	9	–	5	.643	13	–	9	.591
Furman	9	–	5	.643	18	–	6	.750
William & Mary	10	–	6	.625	15	–	13	.536
South Carolina	8	–	7	.533	14	–	10	.583
Wake Forest	7	–	9	.438	10	–	19	.345
North Carolina	8	–	11	.421	12	–	15	.444
Virginia Tech	3	–	10	.231	4	–	16	.200
Richmond	3	–	11	.214	7	–	15	.318
Washington and Lee	3	–	11	.214	6	–	21	.222
Davidson	4	–	15	.211	7	–	18	.280
VMI	2	–	13	.133	3	–	21	.125
The Citadel	1	–	11	.083	8	–	20	.286
† Southern Conference Tournament winner Rankings from AP Poll

The 1951–52 Duke Blue Devils men's basketball team represented Duke University during the 1951–52 men's college basketball season. The head coach was Harold Bradley, coaching his second season with the Blue Devils. The team finished with an overall record of 24–6.
