= Norm Grekin =

American basketball player (1930–1981)

Personal information
- Born: June 22, 1930 Philadelphia, Pennsylvania, U.S.
- Died: September 29, 1981 (aged 51) Bryn Mawr, Pennsylvania, U.S.
- Listed height: 6 ft 5 in (1.96 m)
- Listed weight: 180 lb (82 kg)

Career information
- High school: West Philadelphia (Philadelphia, Pennsylvania)
- College: La Salle (1950–1953)
- NBA draft: 1953: 3rd round, 16th overall pick
- Drafted by: Philadelphia Warriors
- Playing career: 1953–1955
- Position: Power forward

Career history
- 1953: Philadelphia Warriors
- 1953–1954: Pottsville Bolognas
- 1954–1955: Sunbury Mercuries

Career highlights
- NIT champion (1952); NIT co-MVP (1952)

Career NBA statistics
- Games played: 1
- Personal fouls: 1
- Stats at NBA.com
- Stats at Basketball Reference

Norman Grekin (June 22, 1930 – September 29, 1981) was an American professional basketball player. After playing college basketball for the La Salle Explorers, he went on to play for the Philadelphia Warriors in the National Basketball Association (NBA).

== Early life ==
Grekin was born in 1930 in Philadelphia. He started playing basketball at the age of 14. He attended West Philadelphia High School.

== College career ==
After attending West Philadelphia High School, Grekin went on to star at La Salle College from 1950 to 1953. Grekin led the Explorers to the 1952 National Invitation Tournament championship and was named co-Most Valuable Player with his teammate, Tom Gola. It was the first time the honor was shared. In 1953, Grekin received honorable mention in All-American voting from Newspaper Enterprise Association and United Press International. He left La Salle as the second-leading scorer in the school's history.

== Professional career ==
Grekin was selected in the 1953 NBA draft by the Philadelphia Warriors. He entered the Marines in September 1953, but he received a medical discharge after 10 days. He played in his only game for the Warriors on October 31, where he recorded one personal foul, before being waived in early November. According to Warriors coach Eddie Gottlieb, Grekin did not fit as a playmaker playing at guard. Following his brief NBA stint, he played two seasons in the Eastern Professional Basketball League for the Pottsville Bolognas and the Sunbury Mercuries.

== Halls of fame ==
He was inducted into the La Salle Hall of Athletics in 1967. In 2002, Grekin was inducted into the Philadelphia Jewish Sports Hall of Fame.

== Death ==
Grekin died on September 29, 1981, at Bryn Mawr Hospital in Bryn Mawr, Pennsylvania. He was 51.

== Career statistics ==
Legend
GP	Games played	GS	Games started	MPG	Minutes per game
FG%	Field goal percentage	3P%	3-point field goal percentage	FT%	Free throw percentage
RPG	Rebounds per game	APG	Assists per game	SPG	Steals per game
BPG	Blocks per game	PPG	Points per game	**Bold**	Career high

=== NBA ===
==== Regular season ====
Year	Team	GP	MPG	FG%	FT%	RPG	APG	PPG
1953–54	Philadelphia	1	1.0	–	–	.0	.0	.0
