= Tom Gola =

American basketball player and politician (1933–2014)

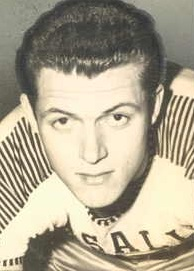
- Gola in 1953

Personal information
- Born: January 13, 1933 Philadelphia, Pennsylvania, U.S.
- Died: January 26, 2014 (aged 81) Philadelphia, Pennsylvania, U.S.
- Listed height: 6 ft 6 in (1.98 m)
- Listed weight: 205 lb (93 kg)

Career information
- High school: La Salle College (Philadelphia, Pennsylvania)
- College: La Salle (1951–1955)
- NBA draft: 1955: territorial pick
- Drafted by: Philadelphia Warriors
- Playing career: 1955–1966
- Position: Small forward / shooting guard
- Number: 15, 6

Career history

Playing
- 1955–1956, 1957–1962: Philadelphia / San Francisco Warriors
- 1962–1966: New York Knicks

Career highlights
- NBA champion (1956); 5× NBA All-Star (1960–1964); All-NBA Second Team (1958); NCAA champion (1954); NCAA Final Four MOP (1954); NIT champion (1952); Helms Foundation Player of the Year (1954); UPI Player of the Year (1955); 3× consensus first-team All-American (1953–1955); NIT Co-MVP (1952); No. 15 retired by La Salle Explorers

Career statistics
- Points: 7,871 (11.3 ppg)
- Rebounds: 5,417 (8.0 rpg)
- Assists: 2,962 (4.2 apg)
- Stats at NBA.com
- Stats at Basketball Reference
- Basketball Hall of Fame
- Collegiate Basketball Hall of Fame

Thomas Joseph Gola (January 13, 1933 – January 26, 2014) was an American basketball player and politician. Gola was inducted into the Naismith Memorial Basketball Hall of Fame in 1976 and the National Collegiate Basketball Hall of Fame in 2006. He is widely considered one of the greatest NCAA basketball players of all time, playing four years with the La Salle Explorers (1951 to 1955). Gola was a consensus first-team All-American for three consecutive years. He has held the record for the most total rebounds in NCAA history since 1955, and was the first college player to have over 2,000 points and 2,000 rebounds in a career. Gola was the Helms Foundations College Basketball Player of the Year in 1954, and the United Press Player of the Year in 1955, as well as being the highest vote recipient for the Associated Press' 1955 All-America Team. He was selected the most valuable player in the 1952 National Invitation Tournament and the 1954 NCAA basketball tournament.

Professionally, Gola spent his most productive seasons with the Philadelphia Warriors of the National Basketball Association (NBA), where he averaged a double-double three consecutive seasons and was an NBA All-Star three consecutive seasons; as well as being named to the second-team All-NBA. He was also named an All-Star twice more while playing for the New York Knicks.

Gola led his high school team to the Philadelphia Catholic League championship; his college team to the National Invitation Tournament championship and the NCAA championship; and was on the 1956 Philadelphia Warriors championship team, all in the space of six years. He is one of only two players to win NIT, NCAA, and NBA championships.

Gola was also involved in politics. In 1966, he was elected to Pennsylvania's House of Representatives and was re-elected in 1968. Before finishing his second term, in 1969 Gola won election as the City Controller of Philadelphia. He was unsuccessful in his 1973 re-election effort for that office. In 1980, he was the Philadelphia chair of Ronald Reagan's presidential campaign, and in 1981 he was appointed as regional administrator of the U.S. Department of Housing and Urban Development. He lost in the 1983 Republican primary for Mayor of Philadelphia.

== Early life ==
Thomas Joseph Gola was born on January 13, 1933, in Philadelphia, Pennsylvania, the third of seven children born to Ike and Helen Gola. Gola's father was a Philadelphia policeman of Polish descent who had changed the family's surname from "Galinsky". Gola was praised as a great all-around player as a high school student at La Salle College High School, part of the Philadelphia Catholic League, where he was second-team All-Catholic League in 1949, and first-team in 1950 and 1951. He led the Explorers to a Philadelphia Catholic League Championship in 1950. He also won the Markward Award as the Catholic League's top player (future basketball Hall of Fame coach John Chaney won the Philadelphia Public League Award the same year).

He entered La Salle University in 1951, one year after another Philadelphia basketball Hall of Famer, and future Gola teammate on the Philadelphia Warriors, Paul Arizin, graduated from Villanova. Arizin, ironically, had been cut from the La Salle high school team.

== College career ==
Gola was one of the most talented collegiate athletes in Philadelphia sports history, and NCAA history. He came to national attention while playing for his hometown La Salle University Explorers men's basketball team (1951 to 1955). Among other accolades, he is among the less than 20 players in college basketball history who have been selected three consecutive years as consensus first-team All-Americans. When Gola received the Helms Foundation Player of the Year Award in 1954, it was written that Gola was "regarded by many basketball experts as the finest all-around player ever developed in the college ranks".

Gola has been reported at 6 ft 6 in (1.98 m) 205 lb (92.98 kg) or 6 ft 7 in (2.01 m) 207 lb (93.89 kg) as a college player. He played center and forward at La Salle, and could dribble, pass, and bring the ball up the court like a guard. Offensively, he had facility with a wide range of shot types. As a scorer, Gola averaged over 20 points per game in four college seasons; and is the NCAA's all-time leading rebounder. He would typically defend the opposing team's best offensive player, and could play all five positions defensively. His nickname was "Mr. All-Around".

Gola was recruited for college by the likes of Kentucky coach Adolph Rupp, North Carolina State coach Everett Case, and the U.S. Military Academy at West Point, but he chose La Salle. Gola starred as a college freshman (1951–52), leading La Salle with 17.4 points and 17.1 rebounds per game averages. He led La Salle to the 1952 National Invitation Tournament (NIT) championship, played in Madison Square Garden. La Salle was considered the underdog in its NIT games, as it was not nationally ranked going into the tournament and its two leading players were freshmen. That La Salle team was known as the "Fuzz Kids".

Gola had 30 points in La Salle's upset of Seton Hall in the tournament's first round. Gola then had a low-scoring game against a St. John's team that was focused on stopping him, but La Salle won because St. John's committed 42 personal fouls during the game. La Salle upset Duquesne in a similar manner where the defense collapsed on Gola holding him to 10 points, but leaving other players open to score. Gola led La Salle with 22 points in winning the championship game over Dayton, 75–64. Gola was selected the co-Most Valuable Player (MVP) of the NIT tournament, along with teammate Norm Grekin.

After the end of the NCAA season, in April 1952 Gola was selected as the first college alternate on the 1952 U.S. men's Olympic basketball team. Grekin was also named as an college alternate.

As a sophomore (1952–53), Gola led the Explorers with 18.5 points and 15.5 rebounds per game. He was a consensus first-team All American. La Salle was 23–5 that season, beginning the season ranked No. 1 by the Associated Press (AP) and ending ranked No. 6. La Salle lost to St. John's in the first game of the 1953 NIT Tournament, 75–74, at Madison Square Garden. Gola went into the game with an injured ankle and played only 3½ minutes in the first half. Gola played full out in the second half. He scored 17 points in the game in helping La Salle come back from a 13-point deficit to tie the game at 74–74 with less than one minute to play; before losing by one point.

Gola had an extraordinary junior season. He averaged a double-double of over 20 points and 20 rebounds per game (23 points per game and 21.7 rebounds per game). He led the NCAA in total rebounds (652). The 652 total rebounds set a new collegiate record. He was selected to the Helms Foundation All-America Team and named the Helms Foundation College Basketball Player of the Year. The AP, United Press, Newspaper Enterprise Association (NEA), and International News Service (INS) also selected Gola as a first-team All-American. He was a consensus first-team All-American for the second consecutive season.

The Explorers were 26–4 in Gola's junior season. He led them to the NCAA University Division basketball championship in 1954. La Salle won the first game of the 1954 NCAA tournament against Fordham, 76–74, in overtime; with Gola scoring 28 points and grabbing 16 rebounds. La Salle then defeated North Carolina State at the Palestra in Philadelphia, 88–81. Gola had 26 points, 26 rebounds, and six assists. La Salle played Navy the next night, winning 64–48. Gola had 22 points, 24 rebounds, and four assists. La Salle met Penn State in the Final Four, winning 69–54. Gola had 19 points and 17 rebounds.

Gola had 19 points and 19 rebounds in the 1954 NCAA title game against Bradley, with La Salle winning that national championship game, 92–76. This was the first NCAA championship game to be nationally televised. Gola was selected as the tournament's Most Valuable Player and was the only unanimous choice for the All-Tournament Team. Gola averaged 22.8 points per game in the tournament and over 20 rebounds per game. In addition to his scoring, the Associated Press praised Gola's "needle–threading passes, rebounding and quarter-backing".

Before the tournament, the AP had never ranked La Salle higher than sixth nationally that year. After winning the NCAA championship, the AP ranked La Salle No. 2 at the end of the season, behind the undefeated University of Kentucky Wildcats who had been ranked first or second the entire year. Kentucky had withdrawn from playing in the 1954 NCAA tournament because its three best players were graduate students who would have been forbidden from playing in the tournament.

As a senior (1954–55), Gola averaged 24.2 points and 19.9 rebounds per game, and typically was assigned to defend an opposing team's star offensive player. For the second consecutive season he led the NCAA in total rebounds (618). The United Press named Gola the College Basketball Player of the Year, and it has been later stated that the Associated Press did so as well. For the third consecutive season Gola was a consensus first-team All-American. He was the first college player to be named an Associated Press first-team All-American in three consecutive years; and received the most votes by far of any player selected to the AP's All-America team that year. In announcing Gola as player of the year, the United Press called Gola "basketball's master craftsman who has been lauded by many as the outstanding college star of all time". In 1955, Sport magazine listed Gola among the top five college players on its all-time college all-star team.

La Salle was 26–5 in Gola's senior year, and reached the 1955 NCAA championship game for a second consecutive year. During the tournament, Gola had 22 points and 16 rebounds in the win over West Virginia, 95–61, 24 points and 24 rebounds in the 73–46 win over Princeton, 30 points, 25 rebounds, and five assists in the 99–64 win over Canisius, and 23 points and 13 rebounds in La Salle's 76–73 win over Iowa. La Salle lost to the Bill Russell, K. C. Jones, and the University of San Francisco in the 1955 NCAA championship game, 77–63. Gola had 16 points and 18 rebounds, while Russell had 23 points and 25 rebounds. This was the only one of Gola's ten NCAA tournament games he would lose.

Russell's 118 point total in the 1955 tournament broke the 114 point record Gola set a year earlier. Russell was the 1955 tournament's Most Valuable Player, and he and Gola were the only two unanimous selections for the 1955 NCAA All-Tournament Team, which also included Jones. La Salle finished the season ranked No. 3 by the Associated Press.

In his two years of NCAA tournament play, Gola scored 229 points in ten games. In his four years at La Salle, over 118 games, he scored 2,461 points, and averaged 20.9 points and 18.7 rebounds per game, with a .407 shooting percentage and .745 free throw percentage. Gola is the NCAA all-time rebounding leader with 2,201 career rebounds (through 2025–26). His 2,461 career points was a La Salle record for over 20 years, and is now third best in school history (through 2025–26). He holds the La Salle records for free throw attempts (267) and free throws made (202) in a single season (1954–55), and for total rebounds (652) and rebounding average (21.7 rebounds per game) in a single season (1953–54). Gola's 26 rebounds against North Carolina State during the 1954 NCAA tournament remains a school single game record. He was the first college player to score over 2,000 points and have over 2,000 rebounds. His La Salle teams were 102–19.

== Professional career ==
=== Philadelphia / San Francisco Warriors (1955–56, 1957 to 1962) ===
After his college career, Gola was drafted by the NBA's Philadelphia Warriors as a territorial draft pick. He teamed with All-NBA players Paul Arizin and Neil Johnston to lead the Warriors to an NBA championship in 1956. He gained praise for concentrating on defense, passing and rebounding and allowing the other two to be the chief scorers during his time playing with them. It was Gola's job to defend against the other team's best guard, and to be a playmaker on offense for his teammates. As a rookie, Gola averaged 34.5 minutes, 10.8 points, 9.1 rebounds, and 5.9 assists per game. He was seventh in the voting for the NBA's Most Valuable Player.

In April 1956 Gola was called up as a draftee to serve in the United States Army. There was some thought at the time he might receive a deferral because of his height but this was not the case. He served from 1956 to 1958, and he did not play in the 1956–57 NBA season. Gola played in 59 games during the 1957–58 season. He averaged 13.8 points, 10.8 rebounds, and 5.5 assists per game. In 1958–59, he played in 64 games, averaging 36.5 minutes, 14.1 points, 11.1 rebounds, and 4.2 assists per game. Gola led the Warriors in assists in the 1957–58 and 1958–59 seasons, and was second-team All-NBA in 1957–58. He was 11th in Most Valuable Player voting in 1959.

Johnston retired after playing only 29 games in the 1958–59 season, due to a knee injury. The Warriors drafted seven-foot future Hall of Fame superstar center Wilt Chamberlain in the 1959 draft. Chamberlain was the NBA Rookie of the Year and Most Valuable Player in the 1959–60 NBA season, averaging 37.6 points and 27 rebounds per game. Gola averaged a double-double for the third consecutive season, 15 points and 10.4 rebounds per game, as well as 5.5 assists per game. Gola was selected to play as an All-Star for the first time that season. During the 1959–60 season, Gola became the first Warrior to have three straight games with a triple-double (the only other being Draymond Green, 2016). On January 10, 1960, Gola recorded 18 points, 19 rebounds and 11 assists in a 116–103 win over the New York Knicks.

The Warriors had a 49–26 record. During their first round playoff series win over the Syracuse Nationals in three games, Gola averaged 11.3 points, 15 rebounds, and 6.3 assists per game. The Warriors lost the 1960 Eastern Division finals to the Boston Celtics in six games. Gola averaged 13.2 points, 8.3 rebounds, and 5.2 assists per game in that series.

The following season (1960–61), Gola was again named an All-Star. He averaged 14.2 points, 9.4 rebounds, and 3.9 assists for the Warriors, who had a 46–33 record. Syracuse beat the Warriors in three games in the 1961 NBA playoffs, with Gola averaging 9.7 points, 12.3 rebounds, and five assists per game. Gola was an All-Star again in the 1961–62 season (though he could not play in the 1962 NBA All-Star Game due to injury). During the regular season, Gola averaged 13.7 points, 9.8 rebounds, and 4.9 assists per game.

The Warriors lost the 1962 Eastern Division playoff finals to the Celtics in seven games. Gola suffered from both a back injury and ankle injury during the series, missing three of those games completely. It was doubtful he would play again after suffering the ankle injury in Game 4, but he came back in Game 7, playing 38 minutes in the Warriors' 109–107 loss; with 16 points and eight rebounds.

Gola played in 471 regular season games for the Warriors, averaging 37.2 minutes, 13.6 points, 9.9 rebounds, and 4.9 assists per game. He played in 39 playoff games for the Warriors, averaging a double-double (11.1 points and 10 rebounds per game), along with 4.6 assists per game. While sacrificing himself for his team, Gola helped the Warriors reach the NBA playoffs in five of his six full seasons with the Warriors. They could not beat the Boston Celtics in the NBA Eastern Division finals in 1960 and 1962, however, even with Chamberlain. Those Celtics teams included Hall of Fame players Bill Russell, Tom Heinsohn, Bob Cousy, Bill Sharman, Frank Ramsay, Sam Jones, K. C. Jones, and Tom "Satch" Sanders.

=== New York Knicks (1962 to1966) ===
The Warriors moved to San Francisco before the start of the 1962–63 season. In early December, the Warriors traded Gola to the last-place New York Knicks for Willie Nauls and Ken Sears. At the time, the Knicks were struggling in all aspects and believed Gola could help improve the Knicks in a variety of areas. Gola was also a fan-favorite in New York because of his successes as a college player in Madison Square Garden. Gola was later selected to the Madison Square Garden Hall of Fame and All-Time Team. He played in 52 games for the Knicks in 1962–63, averaged 12 points, 7.1 rebounds, and 4.3 assists per game, and was named to the All-Star team for the fourth consecutive season.

Gola played three more seasons with the Knicks (1963 to 1966). Gola still made his home in Philadelphia, and the trade brought him closer to his family. Gola commuted from Philadelphia to New York when playing for the Knicks. In the 1963–64 season, Gola was named an All-Star for the fifth consecutive season. He averaged 29.1 minutes per game and led the Knicks in total assists that year. In 1964–65, Gola played in 77 games, starting 41, and averaging 22.4 minutes, seven points, 4.1 rebounds and 2.9 assists per game. In his final NBA season (1965–66), Gola played in 74 games, averaging 15.2 minutes per game as a reserve.

During his NBA playing career, Gola averaged a double-double for three consecutive seasons (1957 to 1960), and was named an All-Star five times. Over his career, Gola averaged 32.3 minutes, 11.3 points, eight rebounds and 4.2 assists per game.

== Coaching career ==
=== La Salle (1968–1970) ===
In 1968, Gola returned to his alma mater as head coach, leading the Explorers to a 37–13 record during his two-year stay. He was called in to pull the program out of trouble after a scandal under prior leadership. He was named Coach of the Year by Philadelphia and New York journalists. He led the Explorers to a 23–1 record during the 1968–69 season, but La Salle had been barred from the NCAA tournament before the season because an alumnus had offered some players "no-show" jobs. Many consider the 1968-1969 La Salle team, which was ranked second in the nation, the greatest team in Philadelphia city college basketball history, though barred from tournament play.

== Honors ==
Gola was enshrined in the Naismith Memorial Basketball Hall of Fame on April 26, 1976. In 2006, he was inducted into the National Collegiate Basketball Hall of Fame. Gola was inducted into the La Salle Hall of Athletes in 1961 and the Big 5 Hall of Fame in 1986. In 1977, Tom Gola was inducted into the National Polish American Sports Hall of Fame. He was in the inaugural class of Atlantic Ten Legends. His No. 15 was retired by La Salle University. He is a member of the Madison Square Garden Hall of Fame and All-Time Team.

In addition to being a three-time consensus first-team All-American; the Helms Foundations College Basketball Player of the Year in 1954; and the United Press Player of the Year in 1955, as well as being the highest vote recipient for the Associated Press' 1955 All-America Team; it has been stated that while at La Salle Gola was an All-District player four times (1952 to 1955), and an All-State player four times (1952, 1953, 1954, 1955). In 1955, he was the only unanimous selection on the Associated Press' Pennsylvania All-State college team.

== Legacy ==
Wilt Chamberlain said, "'When I was growing up [in Philadelphia], you whispered the name Tom Gola, because he was like a saint....'" The legendary John Wooden said Gola was the "'greatest all-round basketball player....'" Notoriously difficult college coach Bob Knight once asked someone to introduce him to Gola, saying, "'Can you do me a favor, can you introduce me to Tom Gola? He's the only guy that played back then that could play for me now. He was my hero.'"

In 2014, Philadelphia basketball authority Sonny Hill said that Gola was not the most dominant college basketball player; but was the greatest all-around college basketball player when considering all phases of the game. Nearly sixty years after Gola's college career ended, Hill observed "'In order to understand how great Tom Gola was, where the game is right now with guys between 6–4 and 6–9 who are multidimensional players who can do everything, he did that in the early '50s . . . He was so far ahead of the game that guys today cannot do what he did. Tom Gola played all five positions defensively. He could bring the ball up the floor. He ran the offense'". Like Knight, Hill called Gola one of his heroes for both Gola's play and his character.

Gola and Arnie Ferrin are the only two basketball players to win an NCAA, NIT, and NBA championship. Gola was the first alternate on the United States Olympic men's basketball team in 1952. In 2002, he was honored in Madison Square Garden as one of the NCAA tournament’s five greatest players, along with Bill Bradley, Oscar Robertson, Chris Mullin, and Kareem Abdul-Jabbar.

=== Tom Gola Arena ===
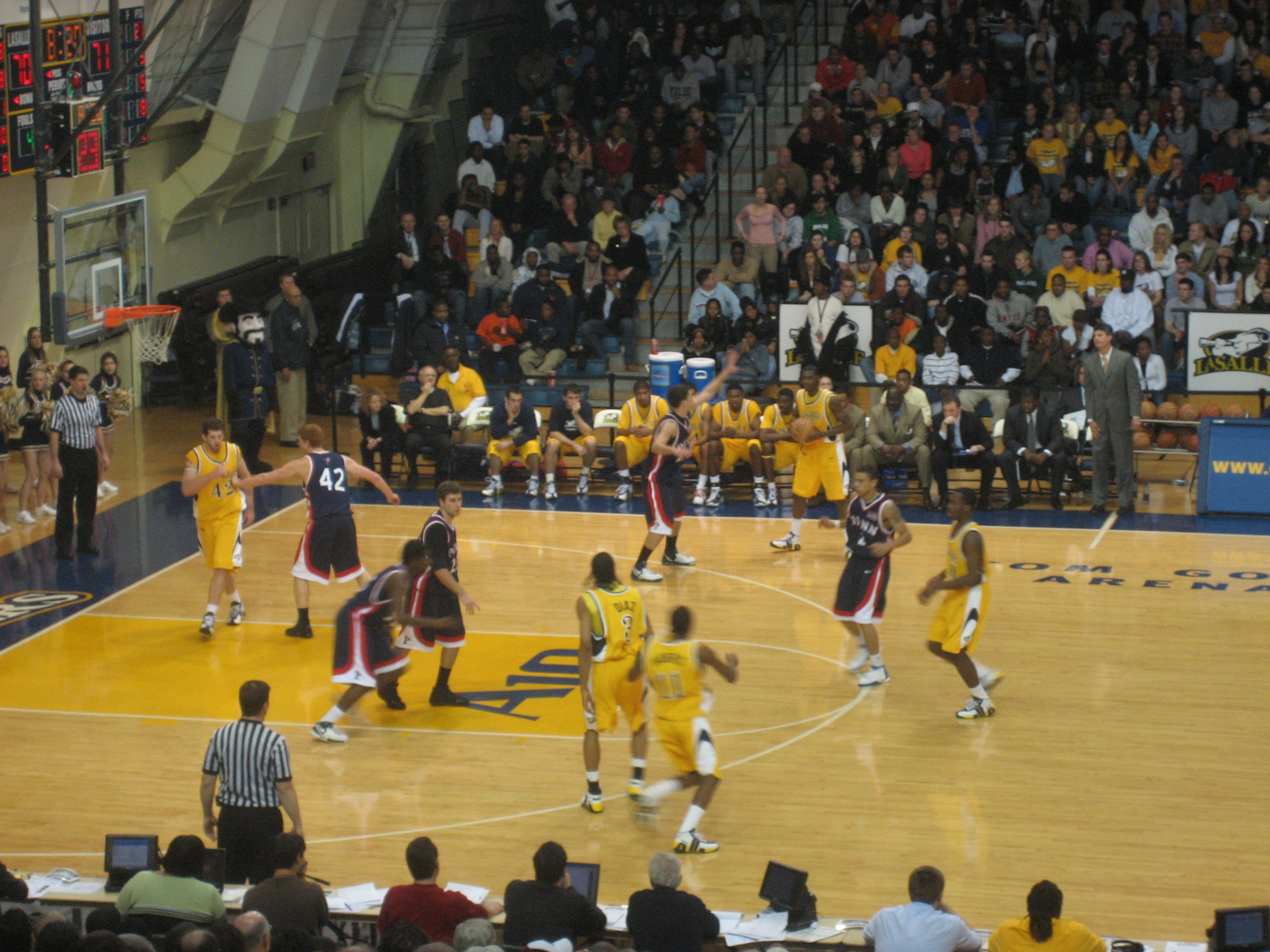
Tom Gola Arena at La Salle University

Tom Gola Arena, home to the La Salle University Explorers men's and women's basketball teams, was named after him. The arena opened in 1998 and hosted its final game in 2024. Tom Gola Arena was reconstructed into the John Glaser Arena, the current home of the Explorers.

=== Tom Gola Plaza ===
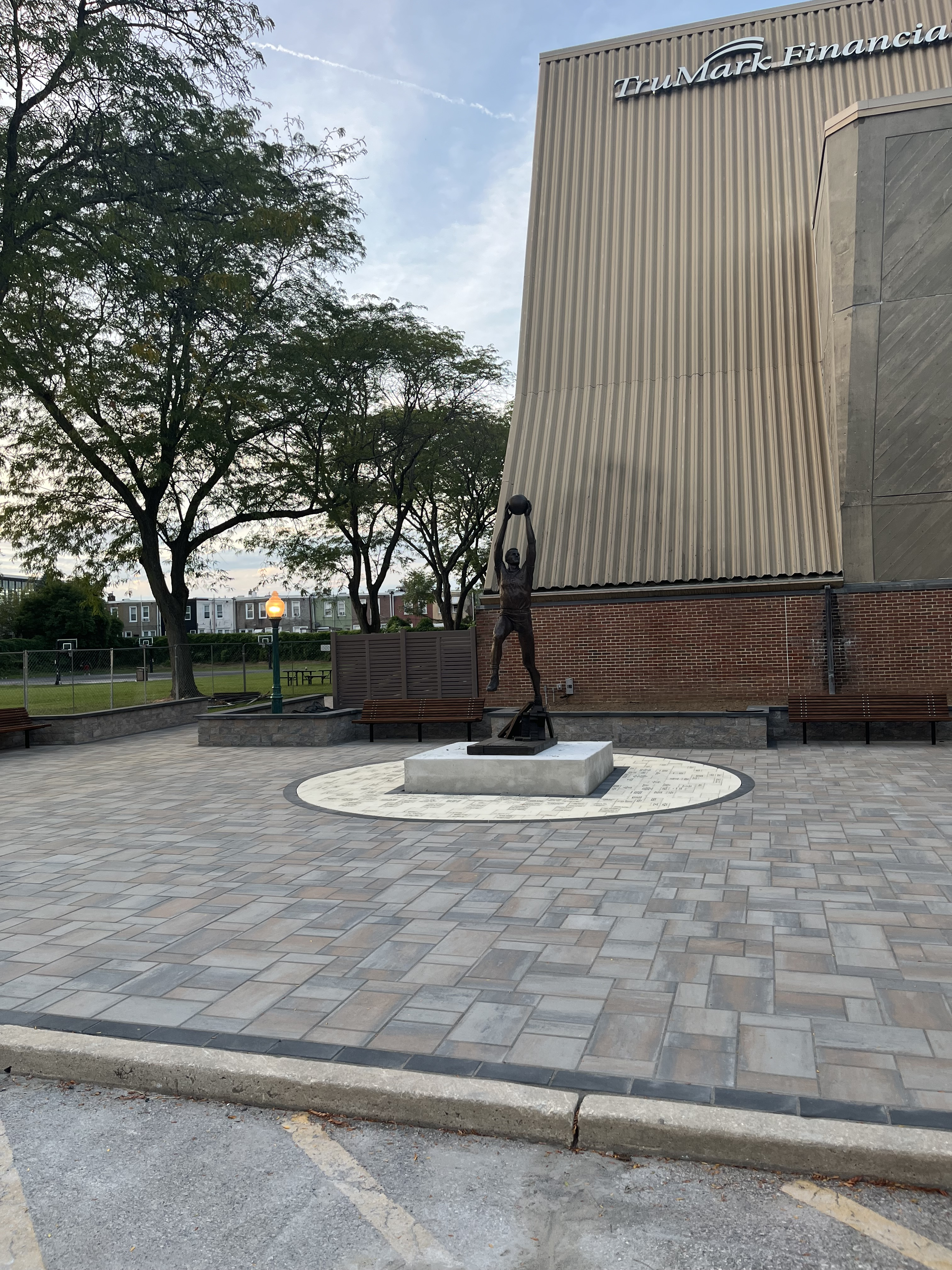
Tom Gola Plaza, outside of TruMark Financial Center

Tom Gola Plaza, located outside of TruMark Financial Center, features a statue honoring Tom Gola surrounded by a brick walkway with names of donors to the men's basketball team, lights, benches, a small garden, and a historical marker. The Plaza was opened on September 26, 2024, to continue the legacy of Gola after his name was no longer connected to the home of the Explorers.

=== Tom Gola Way ===
The driveway in front of TruMark Financial Center was renamed Tom Gola Way in 2024 to honor his legacy.

== Political career ==
In 1966, Gola was elected to the Pennsylvania State House of Representatives as a Republican, representing the newly created Northeast Philadelphia-based 170th District. He won re-election in 1968, even though Democrats prevailed in taking the majority of Pennsylvania House seats that year. A change to the State Constitution made earlier that year had reorganized House seats into legislative districts, replacing the old system of allotting seats on an at-large, county-wide basis. This made Gola the first person to represent the newly created district.

Ultimately, Gola would not finish-out his second term in the House, opting instead to seek the office of Philadelphia City Controller in 1969, and winning that office. He scored an 86,000-vote victory over Democrat Charles Peruto in the general election, and took office the following January. Gola was defeated, however, in his bid for a second term in 1973 by Democrat William Klenk. His defeat was part of a broader setback for Republicans in the city that year, as Arlen Specter lost his bid for a third term as District Attorney of Philadelphia.

Gola was the Philadelphia chair of Ronald Reagan's 1980 presidential campaign, and was appointed by Reagan to be regional administrator of the United States Department of Housing and Urban Development in 1981. Gola made his final attempt at elected office in 1983, when he sought the office of Mayor of Philadelphia. He came in last in the three-man Republican primary, behind Congressman Charlie Dougherty and the winner, John Egan, who went on to lose the fall general election to Wilson Goode.

== Personal life ==
Gola was married to Caroline Norris in June 1955, and they had one son, Thomas Christopher. After retiring from basketball he ran a successful insurance company in Bucks County, Pennsylvania.

At age 70, Gola fell into a coma after a serious fall, in 2003. Gola died on January 26, 2014, thirteen days after his 81st birthday, in Meadowbrook, Pennsylvania. A former U.S. Army specialist, he was buried at the Washington Crossing National Cemetery in Upper Makefield Township, Pennsylvania.

== NBA career statistics ==
Legend
GP	Games played	GS	Games started	MPG	Minutes per game
FG%	Field goal percentage	3P%	3-point field goal percentage	FT%	Free throw percentage
RPG	Rebounds per game	APG	Assists per game	SPG	Steals per game
BPG	Blocks per game	PPG	Points per game	**Bold**	Career high
†	Won an NBA championship

=== Regular season ===
Year	Team	GP	MPG	FG%	FT%	RPG	APG	PPG
1955–56†	Philadelphia	68	34.5	.412	.733	9.1	**5.9**	10.8
1957–58	Philadelphia	59	36.0	.415	.746	10.8	5.5	13.8
1958–59	Philadelphia	64	36.5	.401	.787	**11.1**	4.2	14.1
1959–60	Philadelphia	75	38.3	.433	**.794**	10.4	5.5	**15.0**
1960–61	Philadelphia	74	36.6	.447	.747	9.4	3.9	14.2
1961–62	Philadelphia	60	**41.0**	.421	.765	9.8	4.9	13.7
1962–63	San Francisco	21	39.1	.457	.758	7.0	3.5	13.0
1962–63	New York	52	35.5	**.460**	.784	7.1	4.3	12.0
1963–64	New York	74	29.1	.429	.726	6.3	3.5	9.1
1964–65	New York	**77**	22.4	.448	.739	4.1	2.9	7.0
1965–66	New York	74	15.2	.450	.781	3.9	2.6	4.4
Career		698	32.3	.431	.760	8.0	4.2	11.3
All-Star		4	17.5	.414	.556	2.8	1.8	7.3

=== Playoffs ===
Year	Team	GP	MPG	FG%	FT%	RPG	APG	PPG
1956†	Philadelphia	**10**	36.0	.355	.783	10.1	**5.8**	12.3
1958	Philadelphia	8	40.9	.330	.745	10.5	4.0	**13.8**
1960	Philadelphia	9	37.8	**.412**	**.806**	10.6	5.6	12.6
1961	Philadelphia	3	**42.3**	.206	.750	**12.3**	5.0	9.7
1962	Philadelphia	9	35.1	.271	.760	8.2	2.7	6.3
Career		39	17.5	.336	.771	10.0	4.6	11.1

== Head coaching record ==
Record table
Season	Team	Overall	Conference	Standing	Postseason
La Salle Explorers (Middle Atlantic Conferences) (1968–1970)
1968–69	La Salle	23–1	5–0	1st	‡
1969–70	La Salle	14–12	3–2	2nd	
La Salle:		37–13 (.740)	8–2 (.800)	‡ Ineligible for any postseason tournaments	
Total:		37–13 (.740)			
National champion Postseason invitational champion Conference regular season champion Conference regular season and conference tournament champion Division regular season champion Division regular season and conference tournament champion Conference tournament champion

== See also ==
- List of NBA career playoff triple-double leaders
- List of NCAA Division I men's basketball players with 2,000 points and 1,000 rebounds
- List of NCAA Division I men's basketball career rebounding leaders

Political offices
Pennsylvania House of Representatives
Preceded by District created	Member of the Pennsylvania House of Representatives for the 170th District; 1969–1970	Succeeded by Alvin Katz
Political offices
Preceded by Alexander Hemphill	Philadelphia City Controller; 1970–1974	Succeeded by William Klenk
