= 1977 NBA All-Star Game =

Exhibition basketball game

	1	2	3	4	Total
West	23	35	39	28	125
East	34	34	21	35	124
- Date: February 13, 1977
- Arena: MECCA Arena
- City: Milwaukee
- MVP: Julius Erving
- Attendance: 10,938
- Network: CBS
- Announcers: Brent Musburger and Billy Cunningham

NBA All-Star Game
< 1976	1978 >

The 1977 NBA All-Star Game was an exhibition basketball game played on February 13, 1977, at MECCA Arena in Milwaukee, home of the Milwaukee Bucks. This was the 27th edition of the NBA All-Star Game, and the first to be played after the ABA-NBA merger. It was the first time the NBA All-Star Game was played on a Sunday afternoon after the previous 26 games had been played in the evening. It was the first and only NBA All-Star Game to be held in Milwaukee to date.

The Western Conference defeated the Eastern Conference, 125–124. Julius Erving, in his first All-Star appearance, was awarded the Most Valuable Player trophy by league commissioner Larry O'Brien, becoming only the second player to win the award despite losing. He recorded game highs of 30 points (tied with Bob McAdoo) and 12 rebounds for the East.

== All-Star Game ==
=== Coaches ===
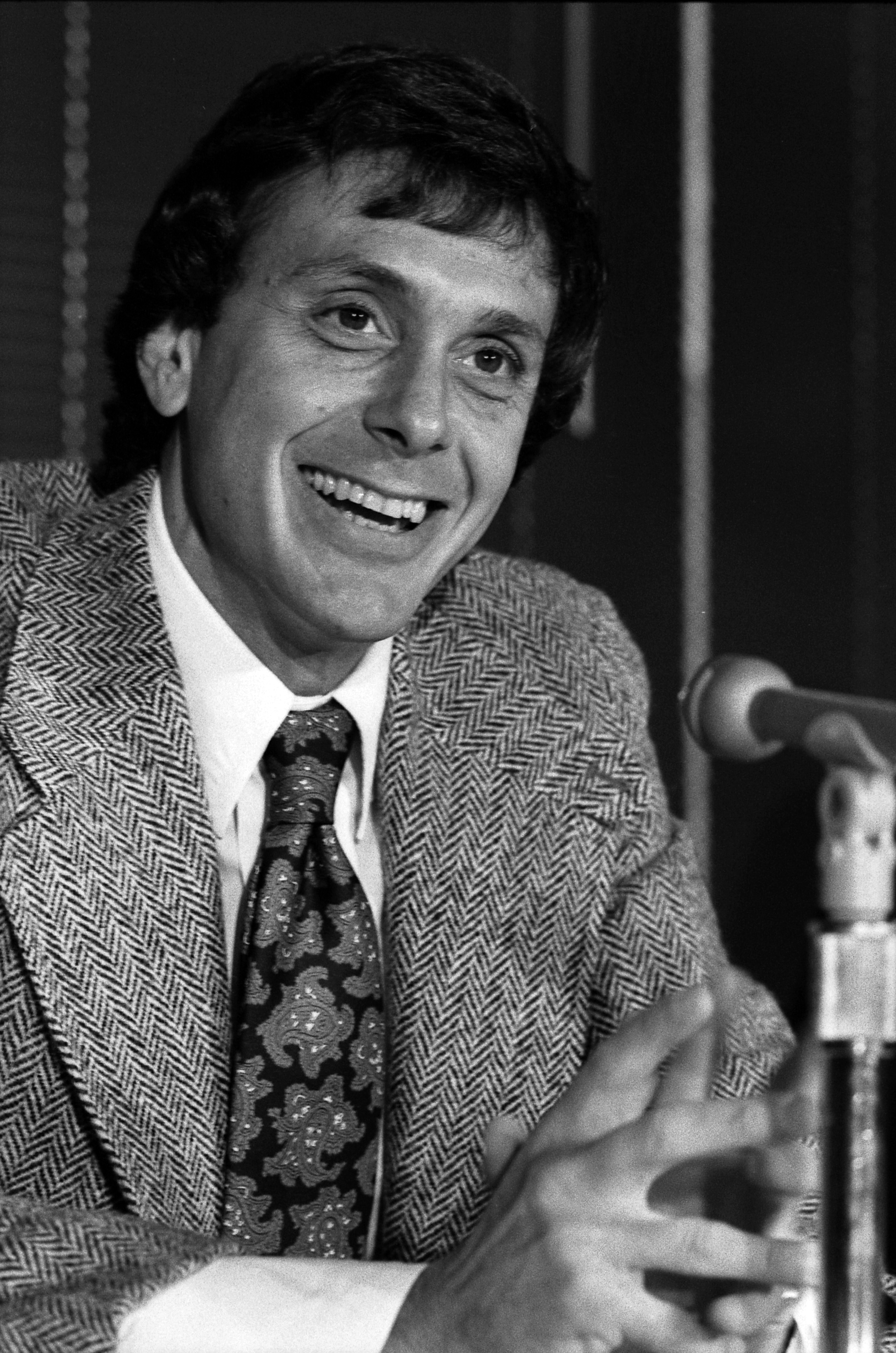
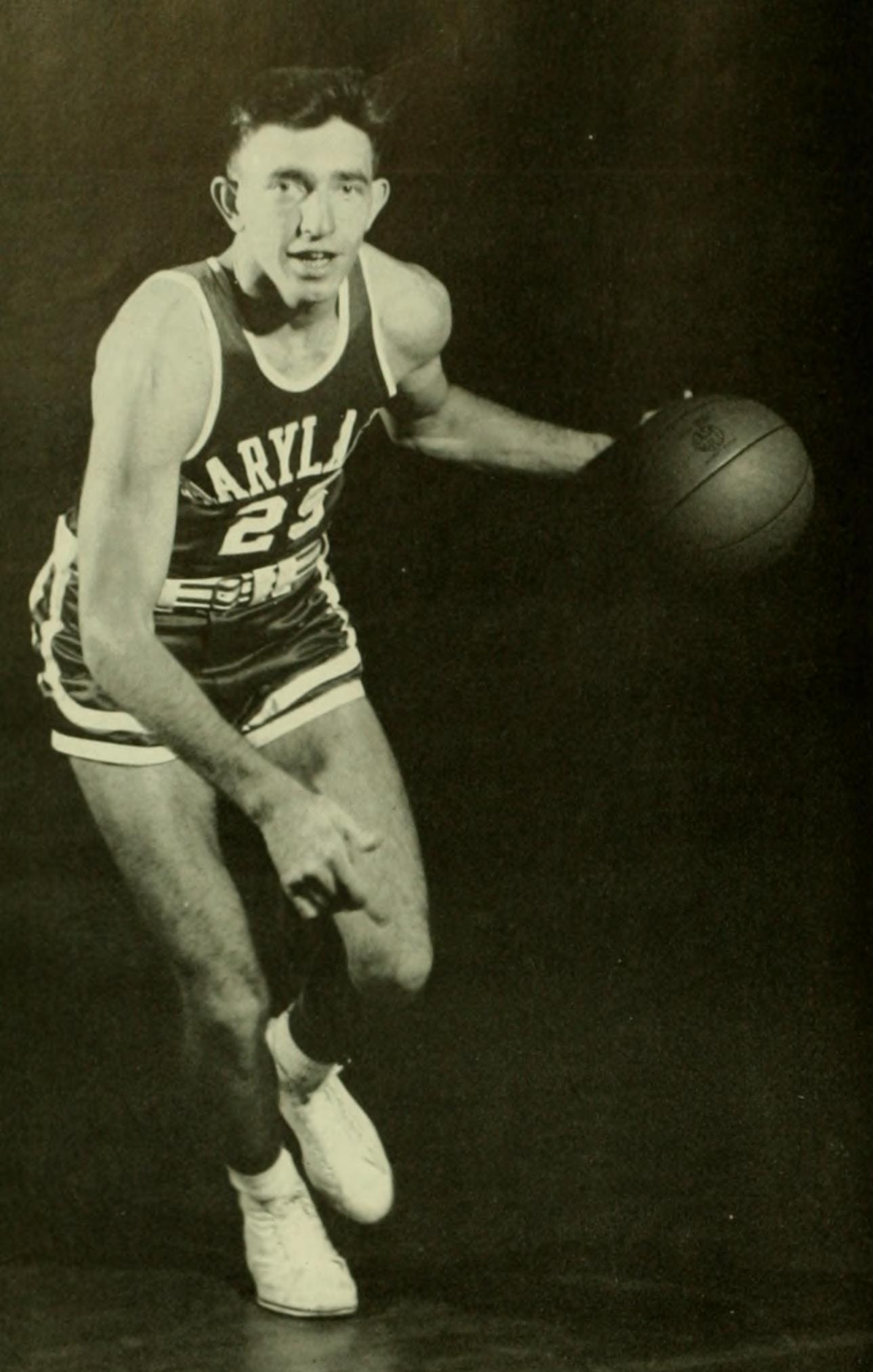
Larry Brown and Gene Shue were selected as the West and East head coach, respectively.

The Eastern Conference team was coached by Gene Shue, head coach of the conference leader Philadelphia 76ers. This was Shue's second time coaching in an All-Star Game. The Western Conference team was coached by future Hall of Famer Larry Brown of the Denver Nuggets, who secured the position by leading the West entering February. Although the Los Angeles Lakers later overtook Denver for the top spot as the game approached, the shift came too late to affect Brown's selection. This was Brown's first time coaching in an All-Star Game.

=== Players ===
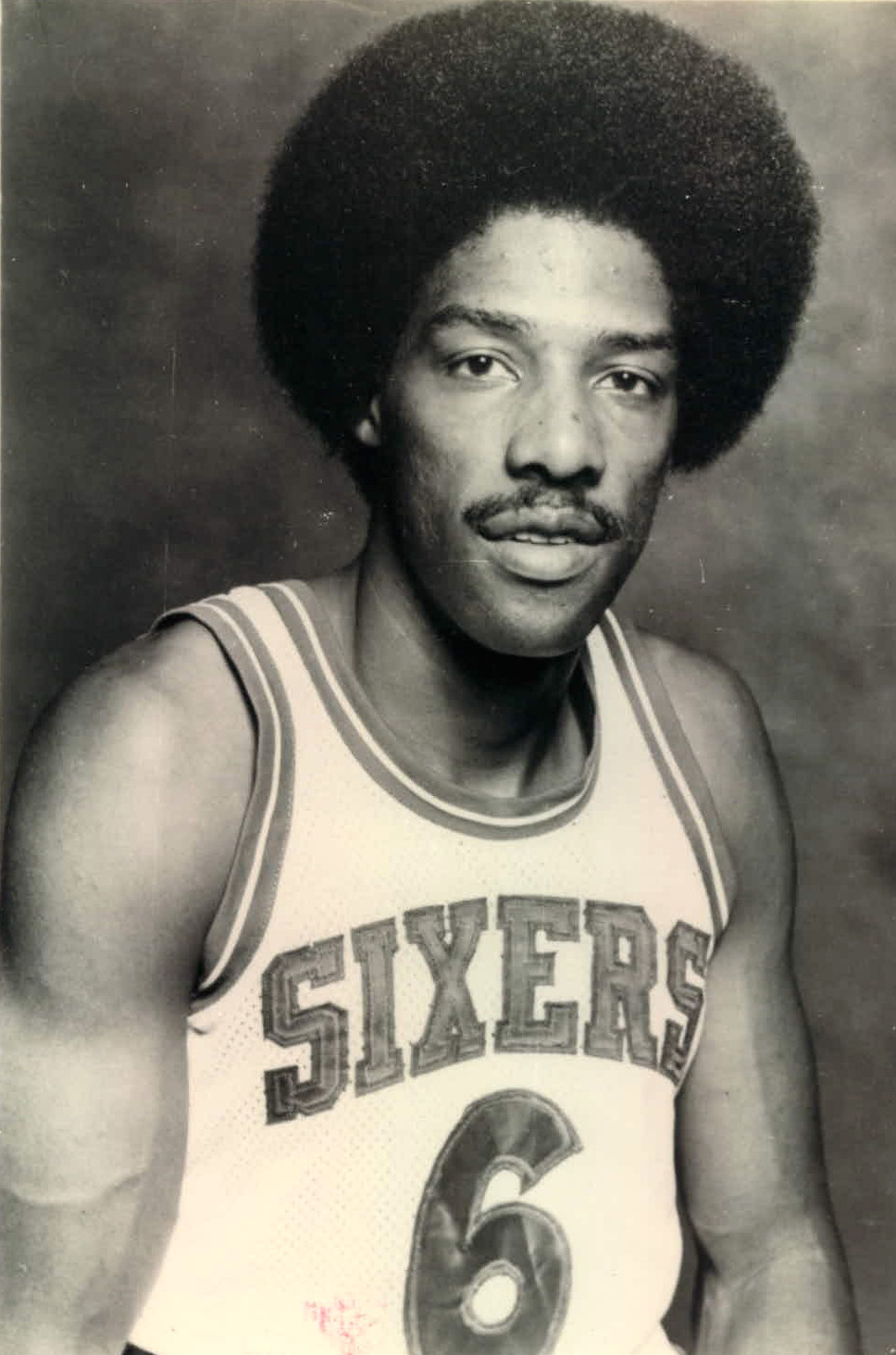
MVP Julius Erving circa 1976

The starting players were voted on by the fans, and seven reserves for each team were selected by their respective coaches. Twelve former ABA players, including Julius Erving of the Philadelphia 76ers, participated in the game. The Eastern Conference team played ten future Hall-of-Famers including Bob McAdoo, Julius Erving, George McGinnis, Rudy Tomjanovich (inducted as a coach), Pete Maravich, John Havlicek, Jo Jo White, Earl Monroe, George Gervin, and Elvin Hayes. The Western Conference Team played seven future Hall-of-Famers including Kareem Abdul-Jabbar, Rick Barry, Paul Westphal, David Thompson, Bob Lanier, Bobby Jones, and Dan Issel.

Despite being selected as a reserve, Los Angeles Lakers player Kareem Abdul-Jabbar led the West team in scoring with 21 points. This was Abdul-Jabbar's eighth appearance in the All-Star Game. Another Western Conference player, Paul Westphal, was an honorable mention scoring 20 points in his first of five consecutive appearances in the All-Star Game. On the Eastern team, Julius Erving and Bob McAdoo of the Buffalo Braves dominated their team's scoring, each recording 30 points. This was McAdoo's fourth All-Star appearance, and Erving's first of eleven consecutive All- appearances.

Notable player selections that did not play due to injury were, on the Western side, future hall-of-famer Bill Walton of the Portland Trail Blazers, and, on the Eastern side, future hall-of-famer Dave Cowens of the Boston Celtics. Walton would be replaced by Don Buse of the Indiana Pacers, and Cowens would be replaced by Phil Chenier of the Washington Bullets. Walton would return that season to lead the Blazers, with the help of All-Star teammate Maurice Lucas, to a 1977 NBA Finals victory over the 76ers, who were led by All-Stars Julius Erving, George McGinnis, and Doug Collins.

=== Roster ===
Eastern Conference All-Stars
Pos	Player	Team	No. of selections	Votes
Starters
G	Pete Maravich	New Orleans Jazz	3rd	235,541
G	Doug Collins	Philadelphia 76ers	2nd	125,173
F	Julius Erving	Philadelphia 76ers	1st	310,517
F	George McGinnis	Philadelphia 76ers	2nd	244,829
C	Bob McAdoo	Buffalo Braves	4th	277,943
Reserves
G	Jo Jo White	Boston Celtics	7th	75,552
G	Earl Monroe	New York Knicks	4th	—
G	Phil Chenier	Washington Bullets	3rd	—
F	Rudy Tomjanovich	Houston Rockets	4th	—
F	John Havlicek	Boston Celtics	12th	187,610
F	George Gervin	San Antonio Spurs	1st	128,130
F	Elvin Hayes	Washington Bullets	9th	65,963
Head coach: Gene Shue (Philadelphia 76ers)

Western Conference All-Stars
Pos	Player	Team	No. of selections	Votes
Starters
G	Paul Westphal	Phoenix Suns	1st	163,173
G	Norm Van Lier	Chicago Bulls	3rd	134,411
F	David Thompson	Denver Nuggets	1st	319,047
F	Rick Barry	Golden State Warriors	7th	179,453
C	Dan Issel	Denver Nuggets	1st	182,585
Reserves
G	Phil Smith	Golden State Warriors	2nd	66,616
G	Don Buse	Indiana Pacers	1st	94,376
F	Bobby Jones	Denver Nuggets	1st	164,892
F	Billy Knight	Indiana Pacers	1st	103,903
F	Maurice Lucas	Portland Trail Blazers	1st	102,624
C	Kareem Abdul-Jabbar	Los Angeles Lakers	8th	146,426
C	Bob Lanier	Detroit Pistons	5th	70,700
Head coach: Larry Brown (Denver Nuggets)

=== Recap ===
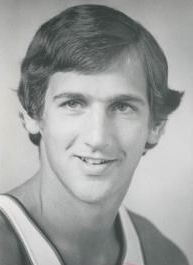
Western Conference guard Paul Westphal circa 1975.

Julius Erving set the tone early, helping the East to a 34–23 lead over the West going into the second quarter. At half-time the West had only shaved the lead by a point with the score sitting at 58–68 in favor of the East. However, in the third quarter the West scored 39 points and stymied the Easts offense limiting them to only 21 points. Going into the fourth quarter with the West favoring the East 97–89, Bob McAdoo of the East produced a flurry of offense scoring 14 points in the period. The boost brought the East back to within one point of the West with a chance to score in the closing seconds of the game. The East never got their final shot of as Paul Westphal stole the ball from West guard Pete Maravich who passed it downcourt to teammate Rick Barry who ran the clock out giving the West the one-point win.

== Eastern Conference ==
Player, Team	MIN	FGM	FGA	FTM	FTA	REB	AST	BLK	PFS	PTS
Bob McAdoo, BUF	38	13	23	4	4	10	2	1	3	30
Julius Erving, PHI	30	12	20	6	6	12	3	1	2	30
George McGinnis, PHI	26	2	9	0	2	7	2	0	3	4
Rudy Tomjanovich, HOU	22	3	9	0	0	10	1	1	1	6
Pete Maravich, NO	21	5	13	0	0	0	4	0	1	10
Doug Collins, PHI	21	3	6	2	2	2	6	0	2	8
John Havlicek, BOS	17	2	5	0	0	1	1	0	1	4
Jo Jo White, BOS	15	5	7	0	0	1	2	0	0	10
Earl Monroe, NY	15	2	7	0	0	0	3	0	1	4
Phil Chenier, WAS	12	3	6	0	0	1	1	0	0	6
George Gervin, SA	12	0	6	0	0	1	0	1	1	0
Elvin Hayes, WAS	11	6	6	0	0	2	1	0	5	12
Dave Cowens, BOS (injured)
Totals	240	56	117	12	14	47	26	4	20	124

== Western Conference ==
Player, Team	MIN	FGM	FGA	FTM	FTA	REB	AST	BLK	PFS	PTS
Paul Westphal, PHO	31	10	16	0	0	1	6	2	2	20
Rick Barry, GS	29	7	16	4	4	4	8	0	1	18
David Thompson, DEN	29	7	9	4	6	7	3	0	3	18
Phil Smith, GS	28	6	13	1	2	6	8	0	3	13
Kareem Abdul-Jabbar, LA	23	8	14	5	6	4	2	1	1	21
Bob Lanier, DET	20	7	8	3	3	10	4	1	3	17
Don Buse, IND	19	2	4	0	0	2	5	0	0	4
Bobby Jones, DEN	14	1	4	0	0	0	3	1	0	2
Norm Van Lier, CHI	14	1	3	0	0	1	1	0	2	2
Billy Knight, IND	12	1	5	2	2	5	0	0	0	4
Maurice Lucas, POR	11	3	9	0	0	4	2	1	2	6
Dan Issel, DEN	10	0	3	0	0	1	0	0	0	0
Bill Walton, POR (injured)
Totals	240	53	104	19	23	45	42	6	17	125

== Score by periods ==
Score by periods:	1	2	3	4	Final
East	34	34	21	35	124
West	23	35	39	28	125

- Halftime— East, 68–58
- Third Quarter— West, 97–89
- Officials: Earl Strom and Lee Jones
- Attendance: 10,938.

== Sources ==
- The Official NBA Basketball Encyclopedia. Villard Books. 1994. p. 249. ISBN 0-679-43293-0.
- "1977 NBA All-Star Game". Basketball Reference. Archived from the original on August 2, 2008.
