= 1974–75 Indiana Pacers season =

ABA professional basketball team season

- Head coach: Bobby Leonard
- Arena: Market Square Arena

Results
- Record: 45–39 (.536)
- Place: Division: 3rd Conference: 3rd
- Playoff finish: ABA Finals (lost to Colonels 1–4)
- Stats at Basketball Reference

Local media
- Television: WTTV 4
- Radio: WIBC

The 1974–75 Indiana Pacers season was Indiana's eighth season both as a team and in the American Basketball Association. This would also become their last season with a majority of their championship core group of players remaining on their team, as the Pacers would trade Mel Daniels and Roger Brown to the Memphis Sounds before the start of the season, though they would be able to get Brown back onto the team before the end of the season through a trade with the Utah Stars. Due to their earlier trade with the Sounds, the Pacers would record a worse record this season than the previous season, though would still make it to the 1975 ABA Playoffs as a third place team in the Western Division in what turned out to be the final season to have divisions in the ABA. Despite the worst regular season finish, the Pacers would not only beat the San Antonio Spurs, but also the Denver Nuggets to reach the ABA Finals for the fifth time in seven years, though they would ultimately lose the championship round to the nearby-rivaling Kentucky Colonels 4–1.

This marked the last ABA Finals appearance for Indiana in this league. The next Finals appearance for the Pacers would be in the 2000 NBA Finals, 24 years after their establishment in that league. They would later reach the NBA Finals once again a quarter-century after that in 2025, though ultimately lose that series in a heartbreaking manner to the Oklahoma City Thunder 4–3 following a serious injury involving point guard Tyrese Haliburton.

== ABA Draft ==
Round	Pick	Player	Position	Nationality	College
1	6	Billy Knight	SG/SF	United States	Pittsburgh
2	16	Bruce King	G	United States	Pan American College
3	26	Roland Grant	C	United States	New Mexico State
5	46	Eddie Woods	C	United States	Oral Roberts
6	56	Ron deVries	C	United States	Illinois State
7	66	Alex English	SF	United States	South Carolina
8	76	Bob Florence	G	United States	UNLV
9	86	Kevin Fitzgerald	G	United States	Oklahoma State
10	96	Mark Brown	F	United States	Missouri Western State

This draft table does not include the "ABA Draft of NBA Players" that was done immediately afterward.

=== ABA Draft of NBA Players ===
Round	Pick	Player	Position	Nationality	College	NBA Team
1	6	Clifford Ray	PF/C	United States	Oklahoma	Chicago Bulls
2	16	Bill Bradley	SF	United States	Princeton	New York Knicks
3	26	Mel Counts	PF/C	United States	Oregon State	Los Angeles Lakers
4	36	Pat Riley	SG	United States	Kentucky	Los Angeles Lakers
5	46	Jim Davis	PF/C	United States	Colorado	Detroit Pistons

The "ABA Draft of NBA Players" that was done on April 17, 1974, happened immediately after the actual ABA Draft done for this season was concluded on that day. None of the five players drafted by the Pacers would report to the team this season. Following this draft's conclusion, both Bill Bradley and Pat Riley would eventually end up becoming members of the Naismith Basketball Hall of Fame, though Riley would make it more for his head coaching prowess (with a potential second induction for his work as a general manager and later executive for teams) over anything else.

== Roster ==
1974–75 Indiana Pacers roster
Players

Pos.	No.	Player	Height	Weight	DOB	From
SF	1	Roger Brown	6 ft 5 in (1.96 m)	205 lb (93 kg)	May 22, 1942	Dayton
PG	10	Don Buse	6 ft 4 in (1.93 m)	190 lb (86 kg)	August 10, 1950	Evansville
SF	35	Charles Edge	6 ft 6 in (1.98 m)	210 lb (95 kg)	February 23, 1950	LeMoyne–Owen
C	41	Len Elmore	6 ft 9 in (2.06 m)	220 lb (100 kg)	March 28, 1952	Maryland
PF	20	Darnell Hillman	6 ft 9 in (2.06 m)	215 lb (98 kg)	August 29, 1949	San José State
SG	43	Kevin Joyce	6 ft 3 in (1.91 m)	190 lb (86 kg)	June 27, 1951	South Carolina
SG	11	Billy Keller	5 ft 10 in (1.78 m)	177 lb (80 kg)	August 30, 1947	Purdue
SF	25	Billy Knight	6 ft 6 in (1.98 m)	195 lb (88 kg)	June 9, 1952	Pittsburgh
PF	30	George McGinnis	6 ft 8 in (2.03 m)	235 lb (107 kg)	August 12, 1950	Indiana
PF	24	Bob Netolicky	6 ft 9 in (2.06 m)	220 lb (100 kg)	August 2, 1942	Drake
SG	4	Johnny Neumann	6 ft 6 in (1.98 m)	200 lb (91 kg)	September 11, 1951	Mississippi
PG	6	Wayne Pack	6 ft 0 in (1.83 m)	165 lb (75 kg)	July 5, 1950	Tennessee Tech

Coaches
Head coach
- Bobby Leonard

Legend
- (DP) Unsigned draft pick
- (FA) Free agent
- (S) Suspended
- Injured

Roster

== Player notes ==
Roger Brown retired after this season.

After leading the Pacers to the finals, George McGinnis decided to jump to the NBA to the Philadelphia 76ers, who held his original NBA draft rights.

== Regular season standings ==
=== Western Division ===
Team	W	L	Pct.
Denver Nuggets	65	19	.774
San Antonio Spurs	51	33	.607
Indiana Pacers	45	39	.536
Utah Stars	38	46	.452
San Diego Conquistadors	31	53	.369

== ABA Playoffs ==
ABA Western Division Semifinals

Game	Date	Location	Score	Record	Attendance
1	April 5	San Antonio	122–119 (OT)	1–0	8,529
2	April 7	San Antonio	98–93	2–0	7,643
3	April 10	Indiana	103–113	3–0	12,217
4	April 12	Indiana	109–110	3–1	17,389
5	April 14	San Antonio	117–123	3–2	10,986
6	April 16	Indiana	115–100	4–2	15,675

Pacers win series, 4–2

ABA Western Division Finals

Game	Date	Location	Score	Record	Attendance
1	April 20	Denver	128–131	0–1	7,444
2	April 22	Denver	131–124	1–1	7,491
3	April 24	Indiana	118–112	2–1	15,496
4	April 25	Indiana	109–126	2–2	17,389
5	April 27	Denver	109–90	3–2	7,483
6	April 30	Indiana	99–104	3–3	17,421
7	May 3	Denver	104–96	4–3	7,401

Pacers win series, 4–3

ABA Finals

Game	Date	Location	Score	Record	Attendance
1	May 13	Kentucky	94–120	0–1	14,368
2	May 15	Kentucky	93–95	0–2	13,212
3	May 17	Indiana	101–109	0–3	17,388
4	May 19	Indiana	94–86	1–3	14,589
5	May 22	Kentucky	95–110	1–4	16,622

Pacers lose championship series, 4–1
