= 1975–76 Indiana Pacers season =

ABA basketball team season (last in ABA)

- Head coach: Bobby Leonard
- Arena: Market Square Arena

Results
- Record: 39–45 (.464)
- Place: Division: 3rd Conference: 5th
- Playoff finish: First Round (lost to Colonels 1–2)

Local media
- Television: WTTV 4
- Radio: WIBC

The 1975–76 Indiana Pacers season was Indiana's ninth season and last in the American Basketball Association (ABA). One noteworthy thing involving the Pacers this season was that they were the team to have been forced to cancel a game against the recently rebranded San Diego Sails franchise after the Sails played in only 11 total games before closing up their franchise on a night where the Pacers were scheduled to play against them in San Diego. Despite later finishing the season with a losing record (which would be their first since the inaugural ABA season), the Pacers would be the fifth and final team to make it to the 1976 ABA Playoffs (being four games ahead of the Spirits of St. Louis despite them having a bunch of star players to their squad), which was the final playoffs ever done in ABA history. Once there, they would lose the quarterfinal round in what would become their final playoff series match against their original ABA rivals (the only other team that would stay put with their team name starting from the initial 1967-68 ABA season, as well as play in every ABA Playoff event, up until this point in time), the Kentucky Colonels 2–1. After that point, the Pacers would ultimately become the final ABA team out of what were considered the four strongest ABA teams in that point in time (the Denver Nuggets, New York Nets, and San Antonio Spurs) to survive the ABA-NBA merger and join the National Basketball Association (NBA) for the following season, with their ABA dynasty they had early on in the league playing a part in them surviving the merger from the ABA to the NBA.

The next time the Pacers would make the playoffs would be in 1981, five years after their original establishment in the NBA, which would also be around the time where they would return to the Eastern Conference after first starting out in the Eastern Division back in the ABA's early days and then playing in the Western Division from 1970 until division play was abolished during the season following the rivaling Utah Stars' departure from the league, and then playing in the NBA's Western Conference from 1976 until 1980. However, they would be the last ABA team to reach the NBA playoffs by that point in time after both the Nuggets and Spurs debuted in the 1977 NBA playoffs following the ABA-NBA merger and the Nets (who would end up moving back to New Jersey following the 1976–77 NBA season, but keep the Nets name after first starting out their ABA tenure as the New Jersey Americans) made their playoff debut in 1979.

== ABA Draft ==
Round	Pick	Player	Position(s)	Nationality	College
1	7	Dan Roundfield	PF	United States	Central Michigan
2	17	Charles Jordan	SF	United States	Canisius College
2	18	Jim Lee	PG	United States	Syracuse
3	27	Ken Tyler	PG	United States	Gonzaga
4	37	Brian Hammel	G	United States	Bentley College
5	47	John Ramsay	F	United States	Seton Hall
6	57	Mike Flynn	PG/SG	United States; Morocco	Kentucky
7	67	Cliff Pratt	G	United States	Shaw University
8	77	Bill Andreas	SF	United States	Ohio State

== Roster ==
1975–76 Indiana Pacers roster
Players

Pos.	No.	Player	Height	Weight	DOB	From
PG	22	Nate Barnett	6 ft 3 in (1.91 m)	175 lb (79 kg)		Akron
PG	10	Don Buse	6 ft 4 in (1.93 m)	190 lb (86 kg)		Evansville
C	41	Len Elmore	6 ft 9 in (2.06 m)	220 lb (100 kg)		Maryland
SG	44	Mike Flynn	6 ft 2 in (1.88 m)	180 lb (82 kg)		Kentucky
SF	5	Travis Grant	6 ft 7 in (2.01 m)	215 lb (98 kg)		Kentucky State
C	20	Darnell Hillman	6 ft 9 in (2.06 m)	215 lb (98 kg)		San José State
SF	34	Charles Jordan	6 ft 8 in (2.03 m)	220 lb (100 kg)		Canisius
SG	11	Billy Keller	5 ft 10 in (1.78 m)	177 lb (80 kg)		Purdue
SF	25	Billy Knight	6 ft 6 in (1.98 m)	195 lb (88 kg)		Pittsburgh
SG	1	Bo Lamar	6 ft 1 in (1.85 m)	180 lb (82 kg)		Louisiana
PF	24	Bob Netolicky	6 ft 9 in (2.06 m)	220 lb (100 kg)		Drake
C	24	Dave Robisch	6 ft 10 in (2.08 m)	235 lb (107 kg)		Kansas
PF	32	Dan Roundfield	6 ft 8 in (2.03 m)	205 lb (93 kg)		Central Michigan

Coaches
**Head coach**
- Slick Leonard
**Assistant(s)**
- Jerry Oliver

**Legend**
- **(DP)** Unsigned draft pick
- **(FA)** Free agent
- **(S)** Suspended
- Injured

=== Season standings ===
Team	W	L	PCT.	GB
Denver Nuggets *	60	24	.714	—
**New York Nets** *	55	29	.655	5
San Antonio Spurs *	50	34	.595	10
Kentucky Colonels *	46	38	.548	14
Indiana Pacers *	39	45	.464	21
Spirits of St. Louis	35	49	.417	25
Virginia Squires †	15	68	.181	44
San Diego Sails †	3	8	.273	—
Utah Stars †	4	12	.250	—
Baltimore Claws †	0	0	.000	—

Asterisk (*) denotes playoff team
† did not survive the end of the season.
Bold – ABA champions

== Player stats ==
Legend
GP	Games played	GS	Games started	MPG	Minutes per game
FG%	Field-goal percentage	3P%	3-point field-goal percentage	FT%	Free-throw percentage
RPG	Rebounds per game	APG	Assists per game	SPG	Steals per game
BPG	Blocks per game	PPG	Points per game

=== Regular season ===
Player	GP	MPG	RPG	APG	SPG	BPG	PPG
Don Buse	84	40.2	3.8	8.2	4.1	0.4	12.5
Billy Knight	70	39.6	10.1	3.7	1.3	0.3	28.1
Len Elmore	76	34.1	10.8	1.6	1.8	2.3	14.6
Dave Robisch	76	31.8	8.8	1.9	0.9	0.6	13.4
Billy Keller	78	29.6	2.9	3.9	0.8	0.1	14.2
Darnell Hillman	74	29.3	9.1	2.0	1.1	1.1	13.4
Bo Lamar	35	25.9	2.8	3.9	1.0	0.0	15.6
Travis Grant	34	16.7	3.0	0.9	0.3	0.4	9.6
Mike Flynn	67	16.4	2.0	2.0	0.7	0.1	6.3
Tom Owens	16	15.2	4.3	0.6	0.1	0.7	6.5
Bob Netolicky	4	13.3	3.0	0.0	0.0	0.3	4.8
Charles Jordan	71	12.0	3.0	0.7	0.5	0.2	5.2
Dan Roundfield	67	11.4	3.9	0.5	0.5	0.6	5.1
Ed Manning	12	11.2	3.1	1.2	0.3	0.2	5.0
Nathaniel Barnett	12	6.1	0.7	0.7	0.3	0.1	2.3

== ABA Playoffs ==
1976 playoff game log
ABA Quarterfinals: 1–2 (home: 1–0; road: 0–2)

Game	Date	Team	Score	High points	High rebounds	High assists	Location Attendance	Series
1	April 8	@ Kentucky	L 109–120	Billy Knight (43)	Darnell Hillman (13)	Darnell Hillman (5)	Freedom Hall; 3,288	0–1
2	April 10	Kentucky	W 109–95	Billy Knight (28)	Billy Knight & Darnell Hillman (11)	Don Buse (12)	Market Square Arena; 5,850	1–1
3	April 12	@ Kentucky	L 99–100	Billy Knight (30)	Billy Knight & Dave Robisch (9)	Don Buse (9)	Freedom Hall; 5,267	1–2

1976 schedule

Pacers lose series, 1–2

== Awards, records, and honors ==
- Don Buse led the ABA in minutes played (3380), steals (346), assists (689), minutes per game average (40.2), assists per game (8.2), and steals per game (4.1)
- Bill Keller led ABA in 3-point field goal attempted (349) and made (123).
- Billy Knight was the ABA's second leading scorer (28.1)

=== ABA All-Stars ===
- Don Buse
- Billy Knight
