= Charles Jordan (basketball) =

American basketball player (1954–2023)

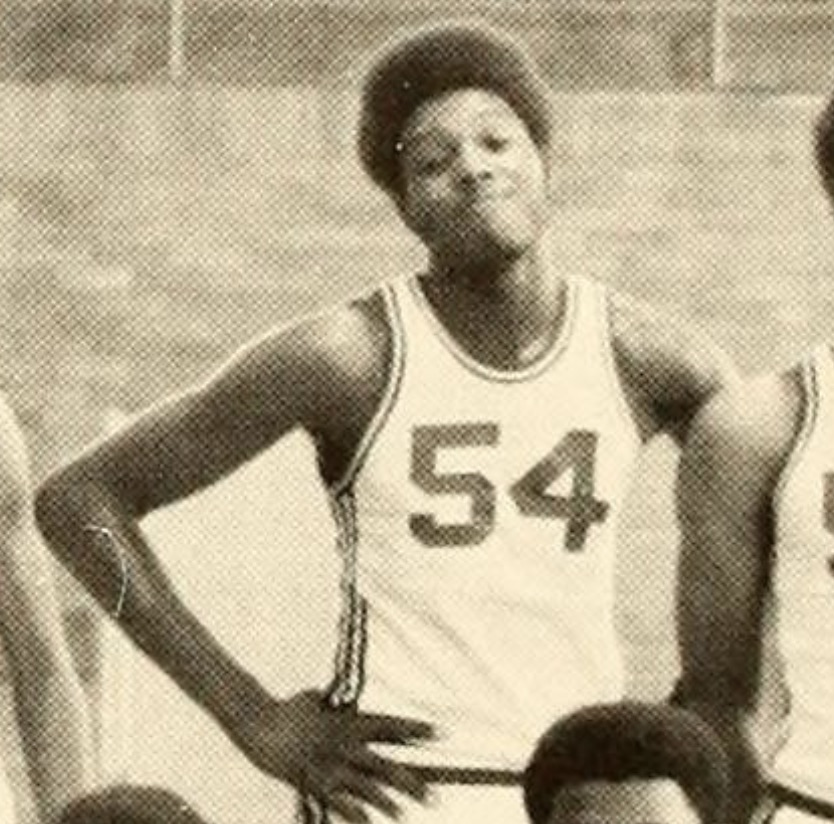
- Jordan in 1972

Personal information
- Born: January 31, 1954 Indianapolis, Indiana, U.S.
- Died: November 10, 2023 (aged 69)
- Listed height: 6 ft 8 in (2.03 m)
- Listed weight: 220 lb (100 kg)

Career information
- High school: Shortridge (Indianapolis, Indiana)
- College: Canisius (1973–1975)
- NBA draft: 1975: undrafted
- Playing career: 1975–1983
- Position: Small forward
- Number: 34

Career history
- 1975–1976: Indiana Pacers
- 1978–1979: ASVEL
- 1979–1982: Fortitudo Bologna
- 1982–1983: Mangiaebevi Ferrara
- Stats at Basketball Reference

Charles C. Jordan (January 31, 1954 – November 10, 2023) was an American professional basketball player who played for one season for the Indiana Pacers of the American Basketball Association (ABA). He then spent the remainder of his career overseas, including stops in France and Italy.

Jordan played college basketball for the Canisius Golden Griffins. He did not play his senior year at Canisius University because the NCAA declared both he and Larry Fogle ineligible for having received "improper financial aid" sometime during his career at the school. Jordan played one year with the Indiana Pacers in the ABA in 1975–76. He also briefly coached at a university in Spain.

Jordan's younger brother, C.J., played college basketball as a 5-foot-10-inch (1.78 m) point guard for the Louisiana Ragin' Cajuns.

Jordan died on November 10, 2023, at the age of 69.
