= NBA All-Defensive Team =

National Basketball Association honor

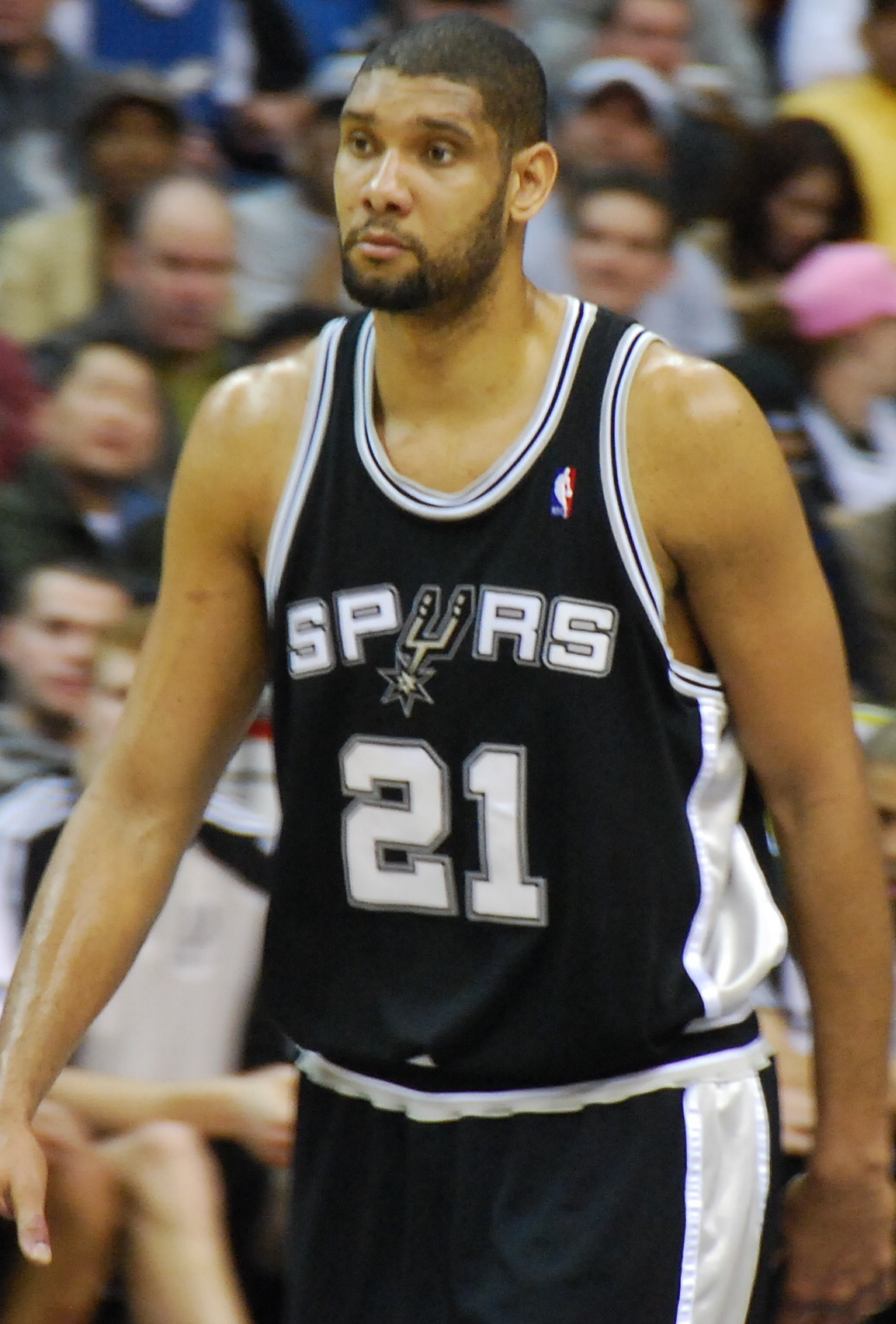
Tim Duncan is the all-time record holder for most All-Defensive team selections (15).

The NBA All-Defensive Team is an annual National Basketball Association (NBA) honor given since the 1968–69 NBA season to the best defensive players during the regular season. The All-Defensive Team is generally composed of ten players in two five-man lineups, a first and a second team. Voting is conducted by a panel of 123 writers and broadcasters. Prior to the 2013–14 NBA season, voting was performed by the NBA head coaches, who were restricted from voting for players on their own team. The players each receive two points for each first team vote and one point for each second team vote. The top five players with the highest point total make the first team, with the next five making the second team. In the case of a tie at the fifth position of either team, the roster is expanded. If the first team consists of six players due to a tie, the second team will still consist of five players with the potential for more expansion in the event of additional ties. Ties have occurred several times, most recently in 2013 when Tyson Chandler and Joakim Noah tied in votes received.

Starting with the 2023–24 season, players must appear in at least 65 games (out of the normal 82-game schedule) to be eligible for most major regular-season playing awards and honors, including the All-Defensive Team. To receive credit for a game for purposes of award eligibility, a player must have been credited with at least 20 minutes played. However, two "near misses", in which the player appeared for 15 to 19 minutes, can be included in the 65-game count. Protections also exist for players who suffer season-ending injuries, who are eligible with 62 credited games, and those affected by what the CBA calls "bad faith circumstances". Also starting with the 2023–24 season, the All-Defensive Teams were no longer bound by position.

Tim Duncan holds the record for the most total selections to the All-Defensive Team with 15. Kevin Garnett and Kobe Bryant follow with 12 total honors each, and Kareem Abdul-Jabbar has 11 total selections. Michael Jordan, Gary Payton, Garnett and Bryant share the record for most NBA All-Defensive first team selections with nine. Rudy Gobert, Scottie Pippen, Bobby Jones, and Duncan made the first team eight times each. Walt Frazier, Dennis Rodman and Chris Paul made the All-Defensive first team seven times. Victor Wembanyama was the first rookie to make the All-Defensive first team, doing it as a member of the San Antonio Spurs during the 2023–24 season.

When the coaches were responsible for voting, there were occasionally inconsistencies between the All-Defensive Team and the NBA Defensive Player of the Year Award, which has been voted on by the media. On four occasions, the Defensive Player of the Year winner was not voted to the All-Defensive first team in the same year. Player of the Year winners Alvin Robertson (1986), Dikembe Mutombo (1995), Tyson Chandler (2012) and Marc Gasol (2013) were instead named to the second team.

== Selections ==
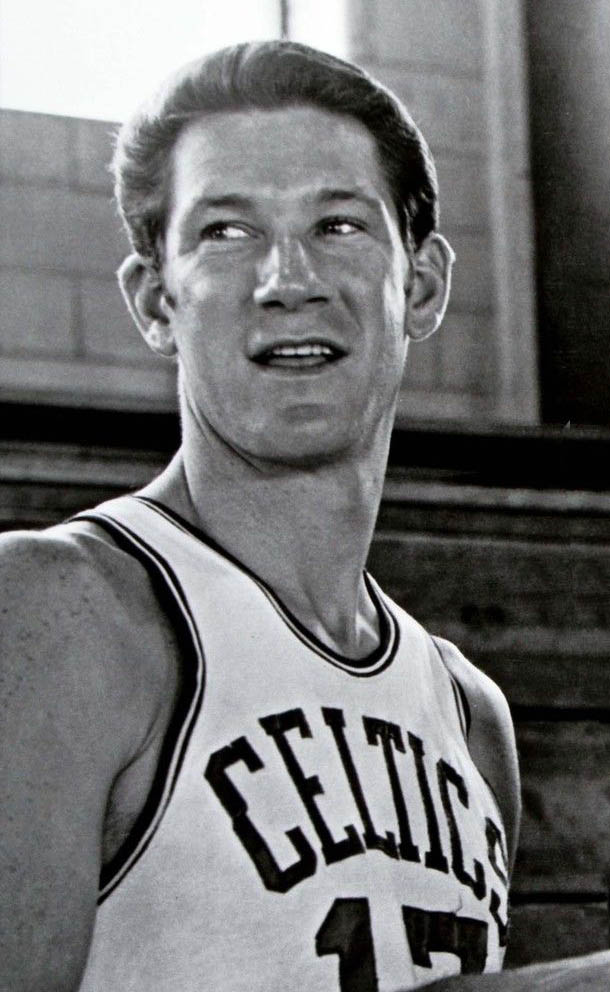
John Havlicek was an eight-time All-Defensive selection.

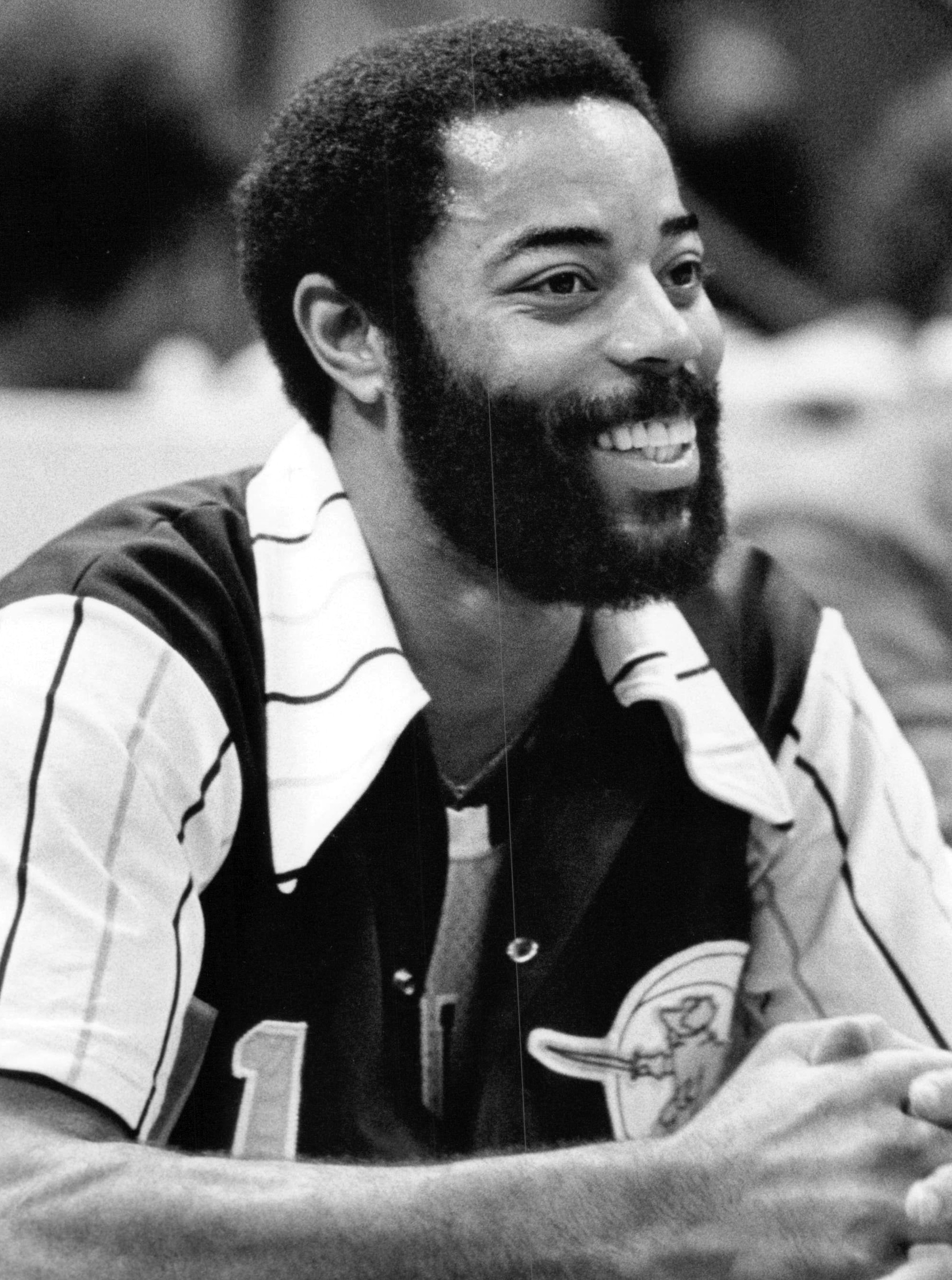
Walt Frazier is the only player to have been on all of the first seven All-Defensive first teams.

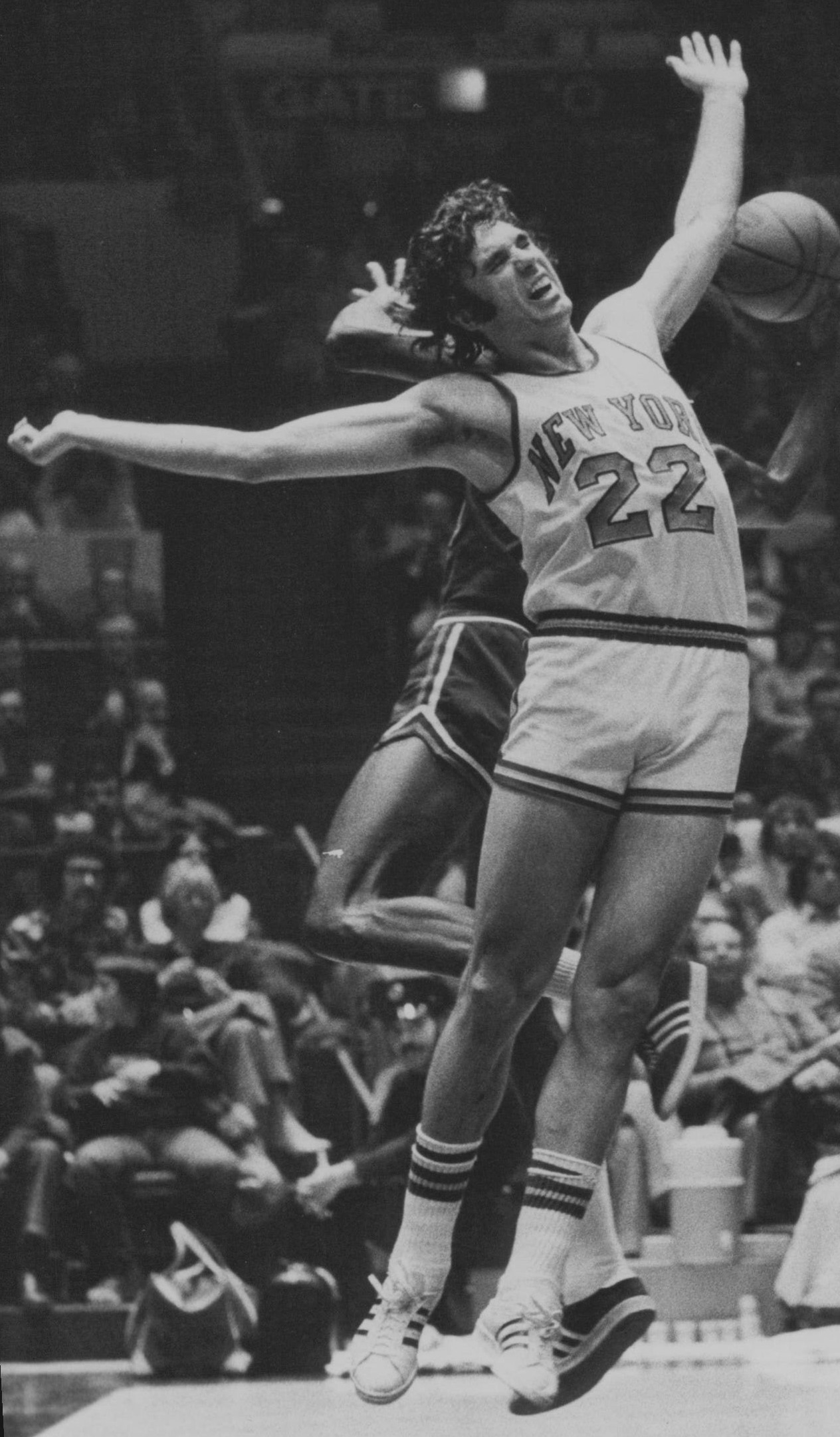
Dave DeBusschere was voted to the first six All-Defensive first teams.

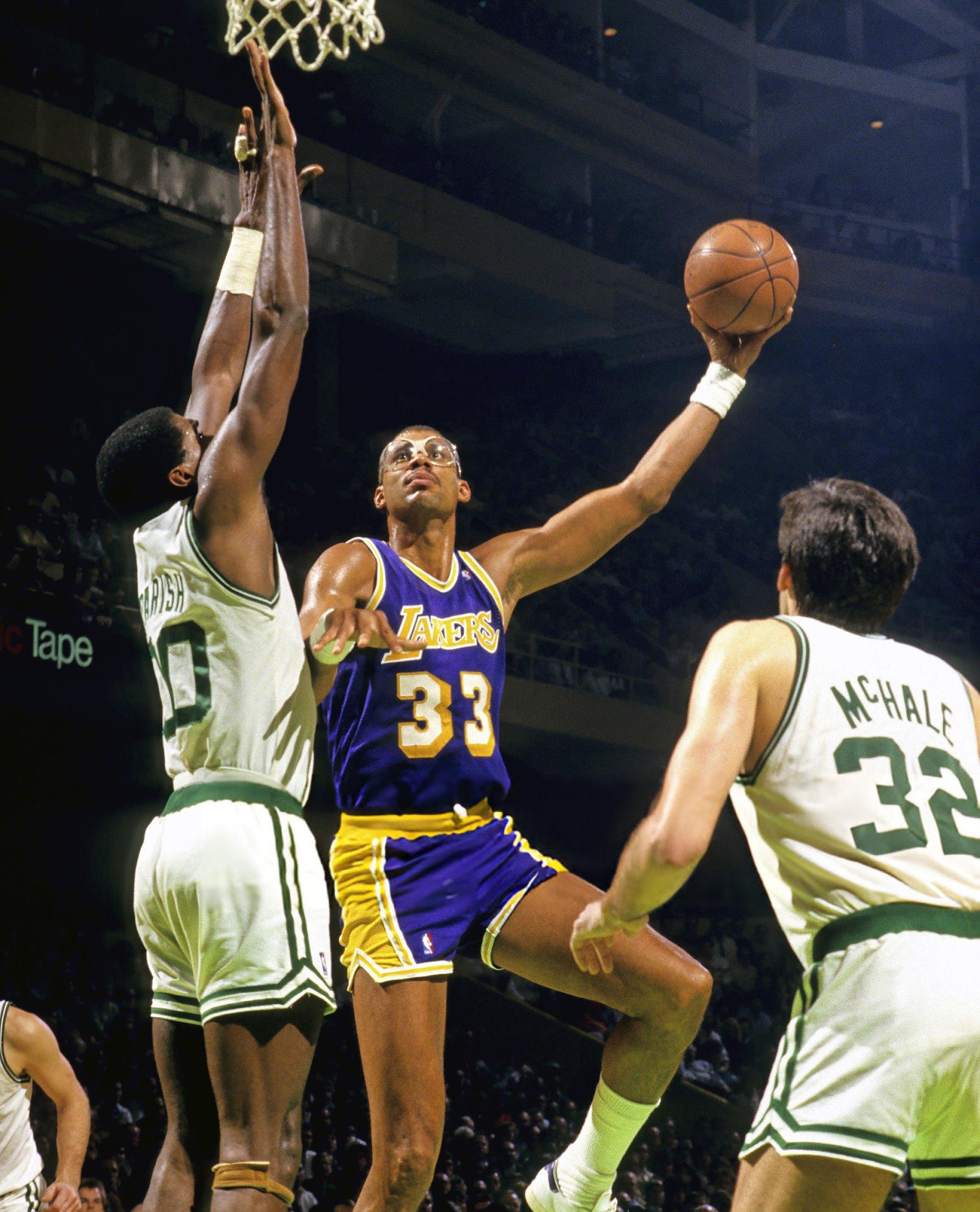
Kareem Abdul-Jabbar, formerly known as Lew Alcindor, has been on 11 All-Defensive teams.

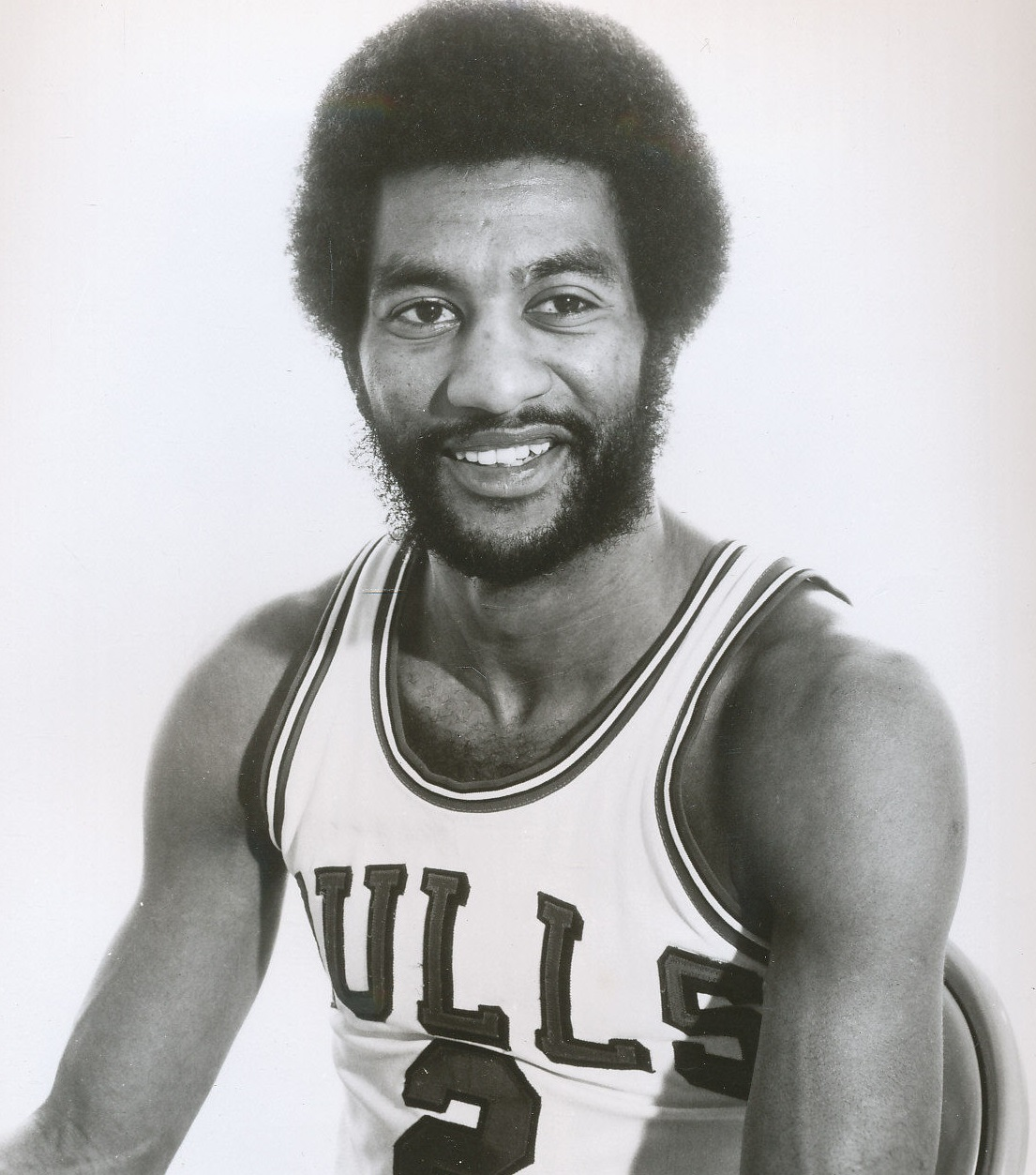
Norm Van Lier was named to eight consecutive All-Defensive teams from 1971 to 1978.

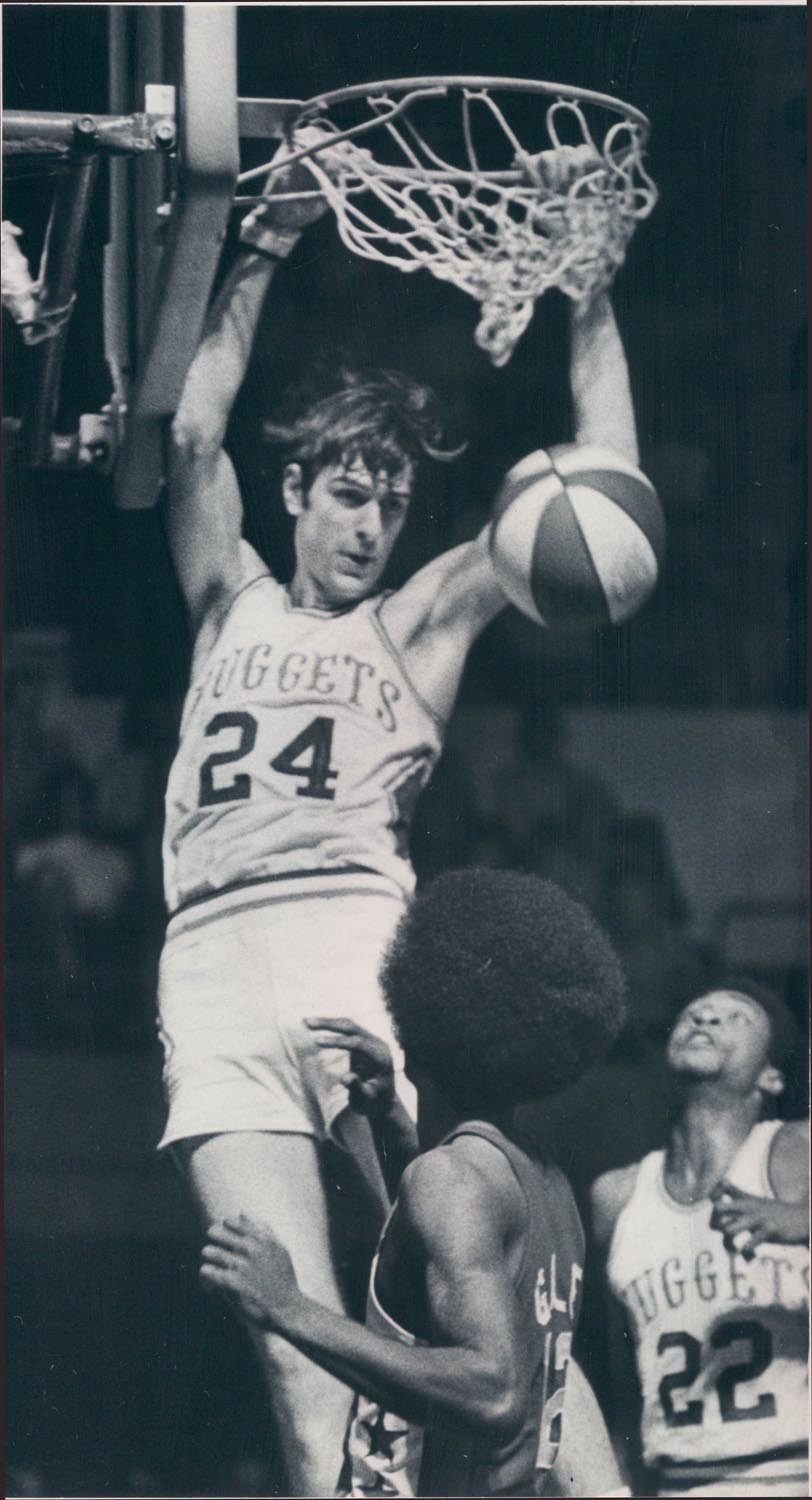
Bobby Jones made nine consecutive All-Defensive Teams from 1977 to 1985.

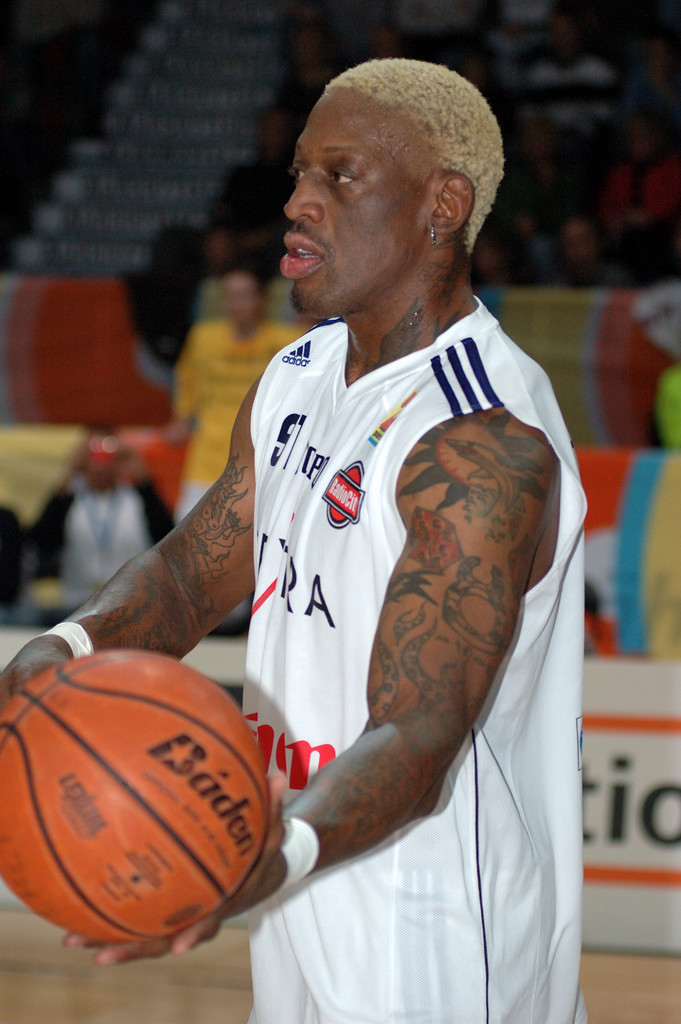
Dennis Rodman has been on the All-Defensive first team seven times.

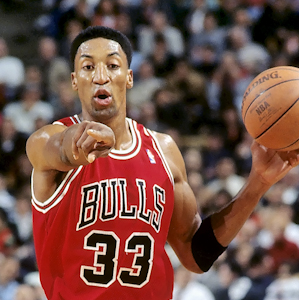
Scottie Pippen made the All-Defensive first team eight consecutive times, from 1991–92 to 1998–99.

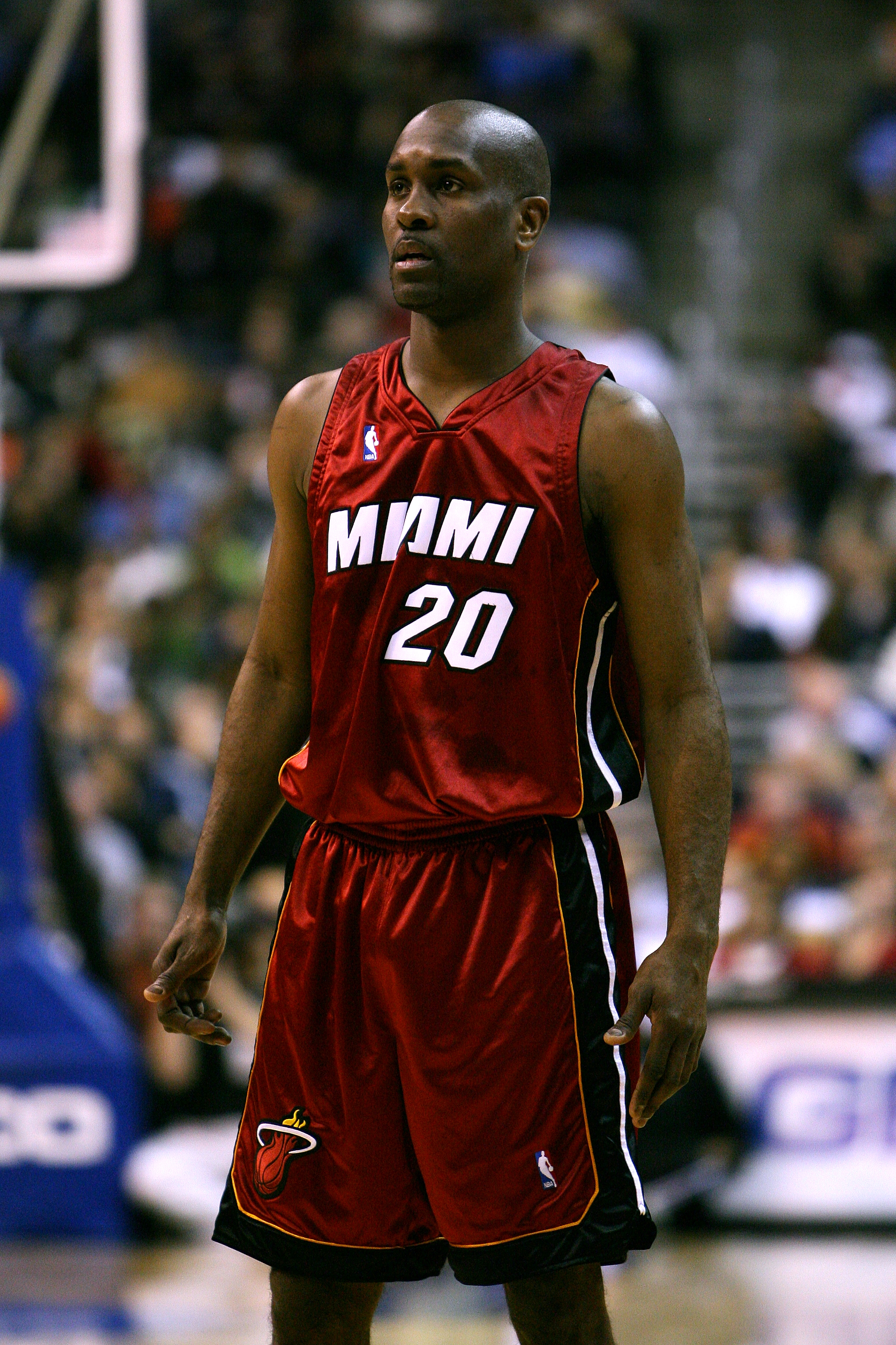
Gary Payton has the record for the most NBA All-Defensive first team selections consecutively, with nine, from 1993–94 to 2001–02.

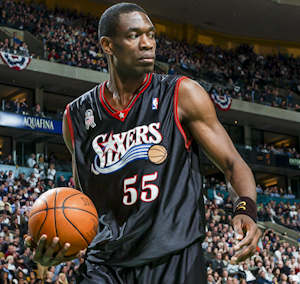
Dikembe Mutombo, who has won four NBA Defensive Player of the Year Awards, has been selected into the All-Defensive first and second team three times each.

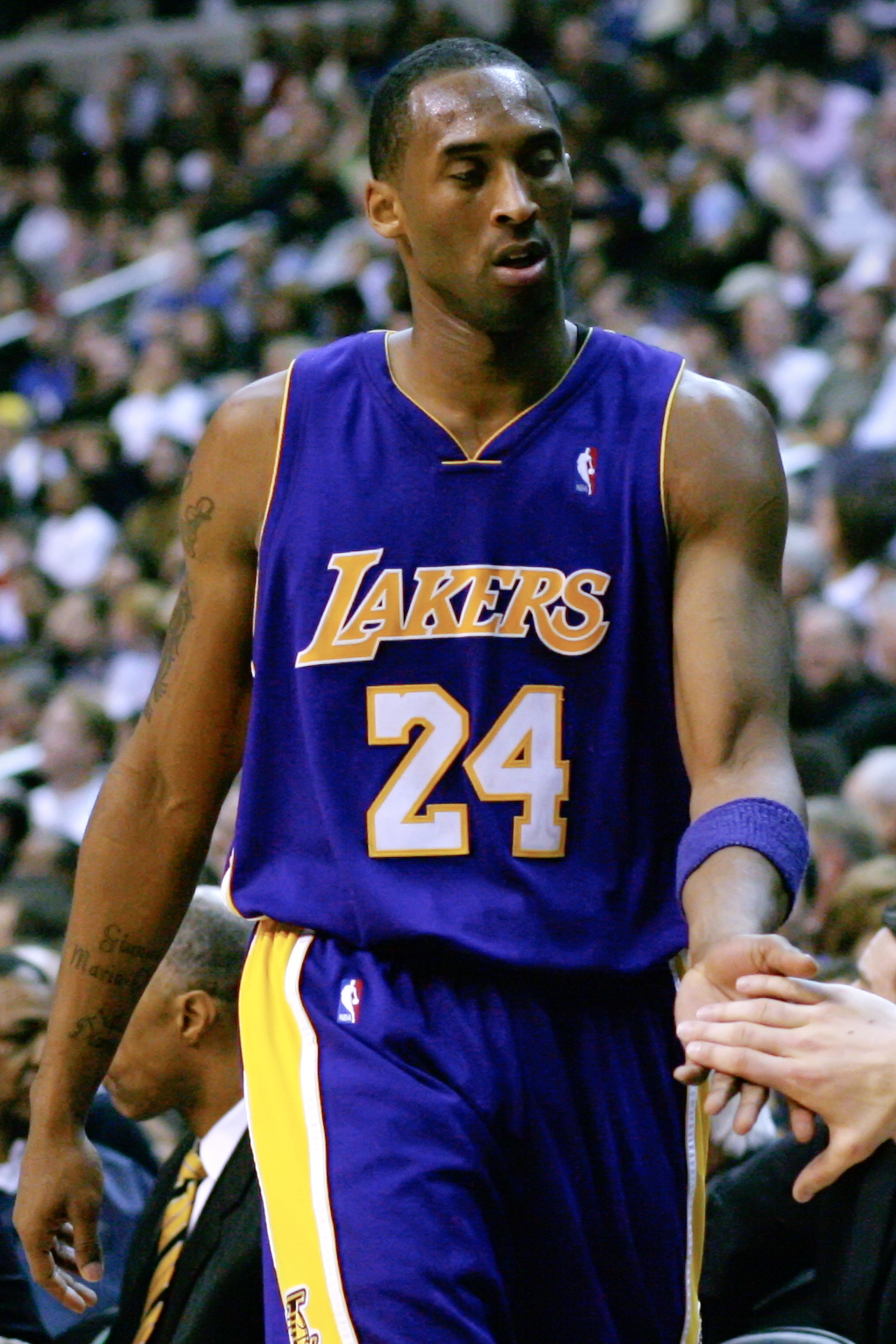
Kobe Bryant has made a total of 12 All-Defensive teams, more than any other guard.

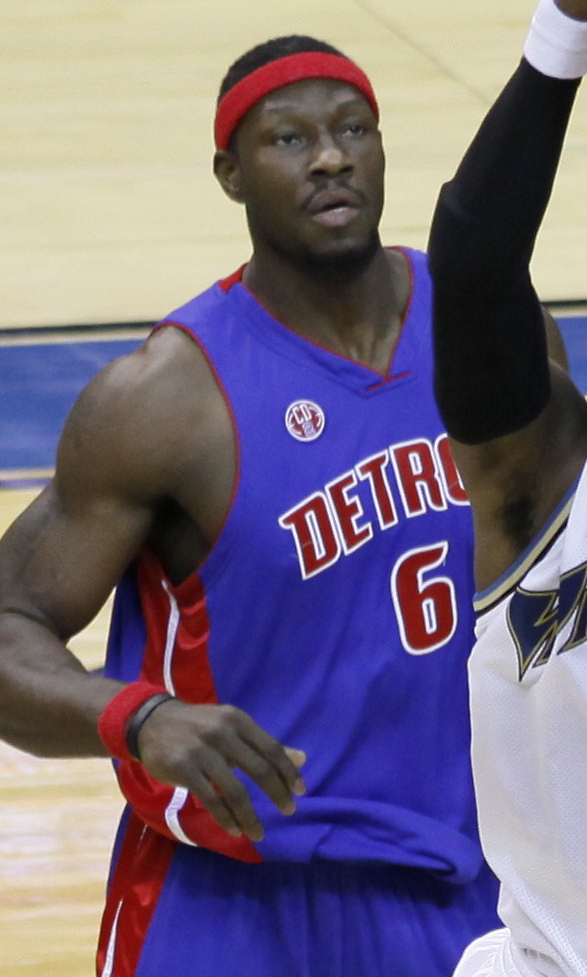
Ben Wallace, who has won four NBA Defensive Player of the Year Awards in five years, has been selected into the All-Defensive first team five times in six selections.

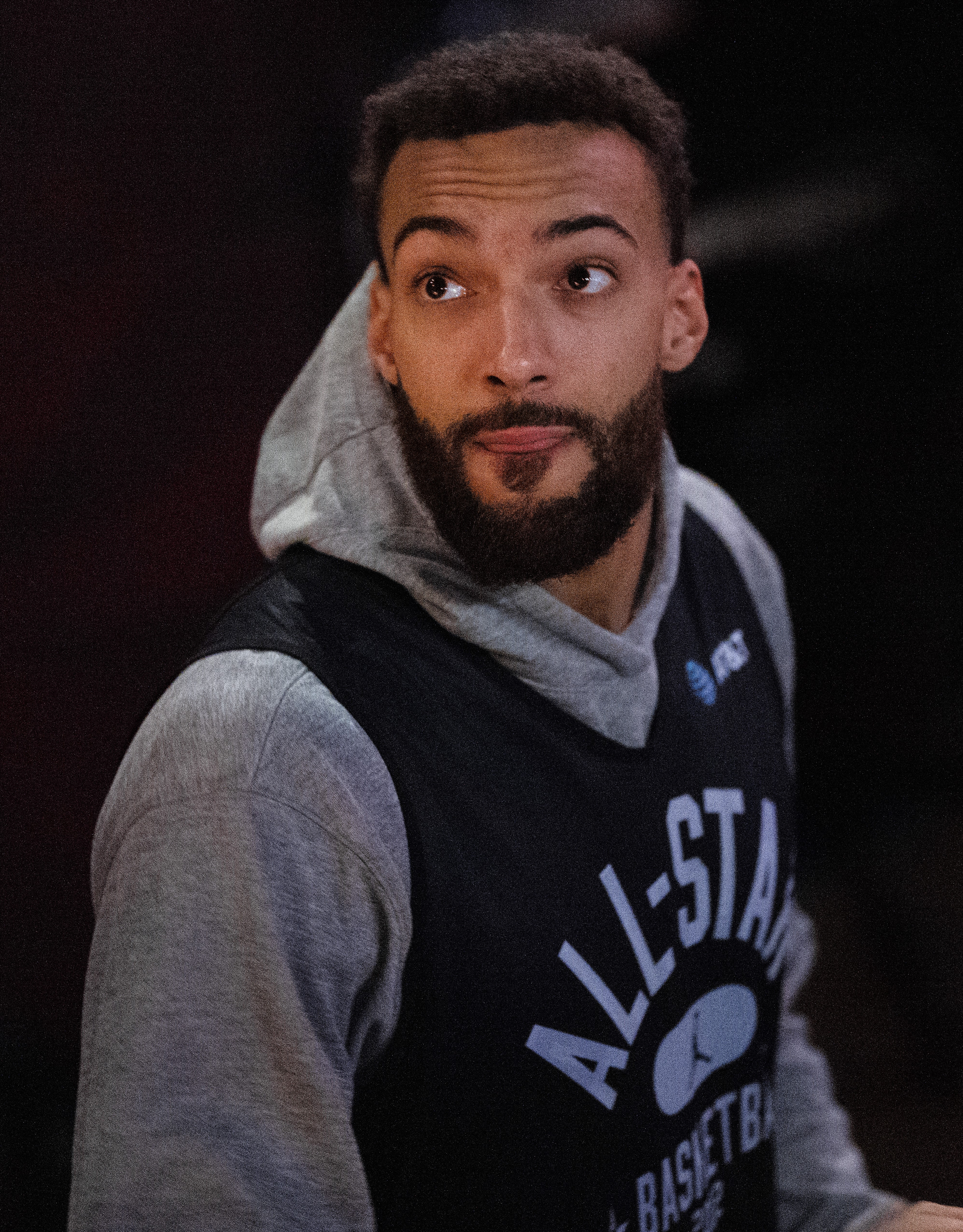
Rudy Gobert, who has won four NBA Defensive Player of the Year Awards, has been selected into the All-Defensive first team eight times.

^	Denotes players who are still active in the NBA
*	Denotes players inducted to the Naismith Memorial Basketball Hall of Fame
†	Not yet eligible for Hall of Fame consideration (Note: A player is not eligible for induction into the Naismith Memorial Basketball Hall of Fame until he has been fully retired for two calendar years.)
§	1st time eligible for Hall of Fame in 2027
Player (X)	Denotes the number of times the player has been selected
**Player** **(in bold text)**	Indicates the player who won the Defensive Player of the Year award in the same year (Note: The Defensive Player of the Year award was first established in 1983.)

Season	First team		Second team	
Season	Players	Teams	Players	Teams
1968–69	(United States) Dave DeBusschere*	New York Knicks	(United States) Rudy LaRusso	San Francisco Warriors
1968–69	(United States) Nate Thurmond*	San Francisco Warriors	(United States) Tom Sanders (Note: Sanders has been inducted to the Naismith Hall as a contributor.)	Boston Celtics
1968–69	(United States) Bill Russell*	Boston Celtics	(United States) John Havlicek*	Boston Celtics
1968–69	(United States) Walt Frazier*	New York Knicks	(United States) Jerry West*	Los Angeles Lakers
1968–69	(United States) Jerry Sloan (Note: Jerry Sloan has been inducted to the Naismith Hall as a coach.)	Chicago Bulls	(United States) Bill Bridges	Atlanta Hawks
1969–70	(United States) Dave DeBusschere* (2)	New York Knicks	(United States) John Havlicek* (2)	Boston Celtics
1969–70	(United States) Gus Johnson*	Baltimore Bullets	(United States) Bill Bridges (2)	Atlanta Hawks
1969–70	(United States) Willis Reed*	New York Knicks	(United States) Lew Alcindor* (Note: Before the 1971–72 season, Lew Alcindor changed his name to Kareem Abdul-Jabbar.)	Milwaukee Bucks
1969–70	(United States) Walt Frazier* (2)	New York Knicks	(United States) Joe Caldwell	Atlanta Hawks
1969–70	(United States) Jerry West* (2)	Los Angeles Lakers	(United States) Jerry Sloan (2)	Chicago Bulls
1970–71	(United States) Dave DeBusschere* (3)	New York Knicks	(United States) John Havlicek* (3)	Boston Celtics
1970–71	(United States) Gus Johnson* (2)	Baltimore Bullets	(United States) Paul Silas	Phoenix Suns
1970–71	(United States) Nate Thurmond* (2)	San Francisco Warriors	(United States) Lew Alcindor* (2)	Milwaukee Bucks
1970–71	(United States) Walt Frazier* (3)	New York Knicks	(United States) Jerry Sloan (3)	Chicago Bulls
1970–71	(United States) Jerry West* (3)	Los Angeles Lakers	(United States) Norm Van Lier	Cincinnati Royals
1971–72	(United States) Dave DeBusschere* (4)	New York Knicks	(United States) Paul Silas (2)	Phoenix Suns
1971–72	(United States) John Havlicek* (4)	Boston Celtics	(United States) Bob Love	Chicago Bulls
1971–72	(United States) Wilt Chamberlain*	Los Angeles Lakers	(United States) Nate Thurmond* (3)	Golden State Warriors
1971–72	(United States) Jerry West* (4)	Los Angeles Lakers	(United States) Norm Van Lier (2)	Chicago Bulls
1971–72	(United States) Walt Frazier* (4) (tie)	New York Knicks	(United States) Don Chaney	Boston Celtics
1971–72	(United States) Jerry Sloan (4) (tie)	Chicago Bulls	(United States) Don Chaney	Boston Celtics
1972–73	(United States) Dave DeBusschere* (5)	New York Knicks	(United States) Paul Silas (3)	Phoenix Suns
1972–73	(United States) John Havlicek* (5)	Boston Celtics	(United States) Mike Riordan	Baltimore Bullets
1972–73	(United States) Wilt Chamberlain* (2)	Los Angeles Lakers	(United States) Nate Thurmond* (4)	Golden State Warriors
1972–73	(United States) Jerry West* (5)	Los Angeles Lakers	(United States) Norm Van Lier (3)	Chicago Bulls
1972–73	(United States) Walt Frazier* (5)	New York Knicks	(United States) Don Chaney (2)	Boston Celtics
1973–74	(United States) Dave DeBusschere* (6)	New York Knicks	(United States) Elvin Hayes*	Capital Bullets
1973–74	(United States) John Havlicek* (6)	Boston Celtics	(United States) Bob Love (2)	Chicago Bulls
1973–74	(United States) Kareem Abdul-Jabbar* (3)	Milwaukee Bucks	(United States) Nate Thurmond* (5)	Golden State Warriors
1973–74	(United States) Norm Van Lier (4)	Chicago Bulls	(United States) Don Chaney (3)	Boston Celtics
1973–74	(United States) Walt Frazier* (6) (tie)	New York Knicks	(United States) Dick Van Arsdale (tie)	Phoenix Suns
1973–74	(United States) Jerry Sloan (5) (tie)	Chicago Bulls	(United States) Jim Price (tie)	Los Angeles Lakers
1974–75	(United States) John Havlicek* (7)	Boston Celtics	(United States) Elvin Hayes* (2)	Washington Bullets
1974–75	(United States) Paul Silas (4)	Boston Celtics	(United States) Bob Love (3)	Chicago Bulls
1974–75	(United States) Kareem Abdul-Jabbar* (4)	Milwaukee Bucks	(United States) Dave Cowens*	Boston Celtics
1974–75	(United States) Jerry Sloan (6)	Chicago Bulls	(United States) Norm Van Lier (5)	Chicago Bulls
1974–75	(United States) Walt Frazier* (7)	New York Knicks	(United States) Don Chaney (4)	Boston Celtics
1975–76	(United States) Paul Silas (5)	Boston Celtics	(United States) Jim Brewer	Cleveland Cavaliers
1975–76	(United States) John Havlicek* (8)	Boston Celtics	(United States) Jamaal Wilkes*	Golden State Warriors
1975–76	(United States) Dave Cowens* (2)	Boston Celtics	(United States) Kareem Abdul-Jabbar* (5)	Los Angeles Lakers
1975–76	(United States) Norm Van Lier (6)	Chicago Bulls	(United States) Jim Cleamons	Cleveland Cavaliers
1975–76	(United States) Don Watts	Seattle SuperSonics	(United States) Phil Smith	Golden State Warriors
1976–77	(United States) Bobby Jones*	Denver Nuggets	(United States) Jim Brewer (2)	Cleveland Cavaliers
1976–77	(United States) E. C. Coleman	New Orleans Jazz	(United States) Jamaal Wilkes* (2)	Golden State Warriors
1976–77	(United States) Bill Walton*	Portland Trail Blazers	(United States) Kareem Abdul-Jabbar* (6)	Los Angeles Lakers
1976–77	(United States) Don Buse	Indiana Pacers	(United States) Brian Taylor	Kansas City Kings
1976–77	(United States) Norm Van Lier (7)	Chicago Bulls	(United States) Don Chaney (5)	Los Angeles Lakers
1977–78	(United States) Bobby Jones* (2)	Denver Nuggets	(United States) E. C. Coleman (2)	Golden State Warriors
1977–78	(United States) Maurice Lucas	Portland Trail Blazers	(United States) Bob Gross	Portland Trail Blazers
1977–78	(United States) Bill Walton* (2)	Portland Trail Blazers	(United States) Kareem Abdul-Jabbar* (7) (tie)	Los Angeles Lakers
1977–78	(United States) Bill Walton* (2)	Portland Trail Blazers	(United States) Artis Gilmore* (tie)	Chicago Bulls
1977–78	(United States) Lionel Hollins	Portland Trail Blazers	(United States) Norm Van Lier (8)	Chicago Bulls
1977–78	(United States) Don Buse (2)	Phoenix Suns	(United States) Quinn Buckner	Milwaukee Bucks
1978–79	(United States) Bobby Jones* (3)	Philadelphia 76ers	(United States) Maurice Lucas (2)	Portland Trail Blazers
1978–79	(United States) Bob Dandridge*	Washington Bullets	(United States) M. L. Carr	Detroit Pistons
1978–79	(United States) Kareem Abdul-Jabbar* (8)	Los Angeles Lakers	(United States) Moses Malone*	Houston Rockets
1978–79	(United States) Dennis Johnson*	Seattle SuperSonics	(United States) Lionel Hollins (2)	Portland Trail Blazers
1978–79	(United States) Don Buse (3)	Phoenix Suns	(United States) Eddie Johnson	Atlanta Hawks
1979–80	(United States) Bobby Jones* (4)	Philadelphia 76ers	(United States) Scott Wedman	Kansas City Kings
1979–80	(United States) Dan Roundfield	Atlanta Hawks	(United States) Kermit Washington	Portland Trail Blazers
1979–80	(United States) Kareem Abdul-Jabbar* (9)	Los Angeles Lakers	(United States) Dave Cowens* (3)	Boston Celtics
1979–80	(United States) Dennis Johnson* (2)	Seattle SuperSonics	(United States) Quinn Buckner (2)	Milwaukee Bucks
1979–80	(United States) Don Buse (4) (tie)	Phoenix Suns	(United States) Eddie Johnson (2)	Atlanta Hawks
1979–80	(United States) Micheal Ray Richardson (tie)	New York Knicks	(United States) Eddie Johnson (2)	Atlanta Hawks
1980–81	(United States) Bobby Jones* (5)	Philadelphia 76ers	(United States) Dan Roundfield (2)	Atlanta Hawks
1980–81	(United States) Caldwell Jones	Philadelphia 76ers	(United States) Kermit Washington (2)	Portland Trail Blazers
1980–81	(United States) Kareem Abdul-Jabbar* (10)	Los Angeles Lakers	(United States) George Johnson	San Antonio Spurs
1980–81	(United States) Dennis Johnson* (3)	Phoenix Suns	(United States) Quinn Buckner (3)	Milwaukee Bucks
1980–81	(United States) Micheal Ray Richardson (2)	New York Knicks	(United States) Dudley Bradley (tie)	Indiana Pacers
1980–81	(United States) Micheal Ray Richardson (2)	New York Knicks	(United States) Michael Cooper* (tie)	Los Angeles Lakers
1981–82	(United States) Bobby Jones* (6)	Philadelphia 76ers	(United States) Larry Bird*	Boston Celtics
1981–82	(United States) Dan Roundfield (3)	Atlanta Hawks	(United States) Lonnie Shelton	Seattle SuperSonics
1981–82	(United States) Caldwell Jones (2)	Philadelphia 76ers	(United States) Jack Sikma*	Seattle SuperSonics
1981–82	(United States) Michael Cooper* (2)	Los Angeles Lakers	(United States) Quinn Buckner (4)	Milwaukee Bucks
1981–82	(United States) Dennis Johnson* (4)	Phoenix Suns	(United States) Sidney Moncrief*	Milwaukee Bucks
1982–83	(United States) Bobby Jones* (7)	Philadelphia 76ers	(United States) Larry Bird* (2)	Boston Celtics
1982–83	(United States) Dan Roundfield (4)	Atlanta Hawks	(United States) Kevin McHale*	Boston Celtics
1982–83	(United States) Moses Malone* (2)	Philadelphia 76ers	(United States) Wayne Rollins	Atlanta Hawks
1982–83	(United States) **Sidney Moncrief*** (2)	Milwaukee Bucks	(United States) Michael Cooper* (3)	Los Angeles Lakers
1982–83	(United States) Dennis Johnson* (5) (tie)	Phoenix Suns	(United States) T. R. Dunn	Denver Nuggets
1982–83	(United States) Maurice Cheeks* (tie)	Philadelphia 76ers	(United States) T. R. Dunn	Denver Nuggets
1983–84	(United States) Bobby Jones* (8)	Philadelphia 76ers	(United States) Larry Bird* (3)	Boston Celtics
1983–84	(United States) Michael Cooper* (4)	Los Angeles Lakers	(United States) Dan Roundfield (5)	Atlanta Hawks
1983–84	(United States) Wayne Rollins (2)	Atlanta Hawks	(United States) Kareem Abdul-Jabbar* (11)	Los Angeles Lakers
1983–84	(United States) Maurice Cheeks* (2)	Philadelphia 76ers	(United States) Dennis Johnson* (6)	Boston Celtics
1983–84	(United States) **Sidney Moncrief*** (3)	Milwaukee Bucks	(United States) T. R. Dunn (2)	Denver Nuggets
1984–85	(United States) Sidney Moncrief* (4)	Milwaukee Bucks	(United States) Bobby Jones* (9)	Philadelphia 76ers
1984–85	(United States) Paul Pressey	Milwaukee Bucks	(United States) Danny Vranes	Seattle SuperSonics
1984–85	(United States) **Mark Eaton**	Utah Jazz	(Nigeria) Akeem Olajuwon* (Note: When Olajuwon arrived to the United States, the University of Houston incorrectly spelled his first name "Akeem". He used that spelling until March 9, 1991, when he announced that he would add an H.)	Houston Rockets
1984–85	(United States) Michael Cooper* (5)	Los Angeles Lakers	(United States) Dennis Johnson* (7)	Boston Celtics
1984–85	(United States) Maurice Cheeks* (3)	Philadelphia 76ers	(United States) T. R. Dunn (3)	Denver Nuggets
1985–86	(United States) Paul Pressey (2)	Milwaukee Bucks	(United States) Michael Cooper* (6)	Los Angeles Lakers
1985–86	(United States) Kevin McHale* (2)	Boston Celtics	(United States) Bill Hanzlik	Denver Nuggets
1985–86	(United States) Mark Eaton (2)	Utah Jazz	(Sudan) Manute Bol	Washington Bullets
1985–86	(United States) Sidney Moncrief* (5)	Milwaukee Bucks	(United States) **Alvin Robertson**	San Antonio Spurs
1985–86	(United States) Maurice Cheeks* (4)	Philadelphia 76ers	(United States) Dennis Johnson* (8)	Boston Celtics
1986–87	(United States) Kevin McHale* (3)	Boston Celtics	(United States) Paul Pressey (3)	Milwaukee Bucks
1986–87	(United States) **Michael Cooper*** (7)	Los Angeles Lakers	(United States) Rodney McCray	Houston Rockets
1986–87	(Nigeria) Akeem Olajuwon* (2)	Houston Rockets	(United States) Mark Eaton (3)	Utah Jazz
1986–87	(United States) Alvin Robertson (2)	San Antonio Spurs	(United States) Maurice Cheeks* (5)	Philadelphia 76ers
1986–87	(United States) Dennis Johnson* (9)	Boston Celtics	(United States) Derek Harper	Dallas Mavericks
1987–88	(United States) Kevin McHale* (4)	Boston Celtics	(United States) Buck Williams	New Jersey Nets
1987–88	(United States) Rodney McCray (2)	Houston Rockets	(United States) Karl Malone*	Utah Jazz
1987–88	(Nigeria) Akeem Olajuwon* (3)	Houston Rockets	(United States) Mark Eaton (4) (tie)	Utah Jazz
1987–88	(Nigeria) Akeem Olajuwon* (3)	Houston Rockets	(Jamaica) Patrick Ewing* (tie)	New York Knicks
1987–88	(United States) Michael Cooper* (8)	Los Angeles Lakers	(United States) Alvin Robertson (3)	San Antonio Spurs
1987–88	(United States) **Michael Jordan***	Chicago Bulls	(United States) Lafayette Lever	Denver Nuggets
1988–89	(United States) Dennis Rodman*	Detroit Pistons	(United States) Kevin McHale* (5)	Boston Celtics
1988–89	(United States) Larry Nance	Cleveland Cavaliers	(United States) A.C. Green	Los Angeles Lakers
1988–89	(United States) **Mark Eaton** (5)	Utah Jazz	(Jamaica) Patrick Ewing* (2)	New York Knicks
1988–89	(United States) Michael Jordan* (2)	Chicago Bulls	(United States) John Stockton*	Utah Jazz
1988–89	(United States) Joe Dumars*	Detroit Pistons	(United States) Alvin Robertson (4)	San Antonio Spurs
1989–90	(United States) **Dennis Rodman*** (2)	Detroit Pistons	(United States) Kevin McHale* (6)	Boston Celtics
1989–90	(United States) Buck Williams (2)	Portland Trail Blazers	(United States) Rick Mahorn	Philadelphia 76ers
1989–90	(Nigeria) Akeem Olajuwon* (4)	Houston Rockets	(United States) David Robinson*	San Antonio Spurs
1989–90	(United States) Michael Jordan* (3)	Chicago Bulls	(United States) Derek Harper (2)	Dallas Mavericks
1989–90	(United States) Joe Dumars* (2)	Detroit Pistons	(United States) Alvin Robertson (5)	Milwaukee Bucks
1990–91	(United States) Michael Jordan* (4)	Chicago Bulls	(United States) Joe Dumars* (3)	Detroit Pistons
1990–91	(United States) Alvin Robertson (6)	Milwaukee Bucks	(United States) John Stockton* (2)	Utah Jazz
1990–91	(United States) David Robinson* (2)	San Antonio Spurs	(Nigeria) Hakeem Olajuwon* (5)	Houston Rockets
1990–91	(United States) **Dennis Rodman*** (3)	Detroit Pistons	(United States) Scottie Pippen*	Chicago Bulls
1990–91	(United States) Buck Williams (3)	Portland Trail Blazers	(United States) Dan Majerle	Phoenix Suns
1991–92	(United States) Dennis Rodman* (4)	Detroit Pistons	(United States) Larry Nance (2)	Cleveland Cavaliers
1991–92	(United States) Scottie Pippen* (2)	Chicago Bulls	(United States) Buck Williams (4)	Portland Trail Blazers
1991–92	(United States) **David Robinson*** (3)	San Antonio Spurs	(Jamaica) Patrick Ewing* (3)	New York Knicks
1991–92	(United States) Michael Jordan* (5)	Chicago Bulls	(United States) John Stockton* (3)	Utah Jazz
1991–92	(United States) Joe Dumars* (4)	Detroit Pistons	(United States) Micheal Williams	Indiana Pacers
1992–93	(United States) Scottie Pippen* (3)	Chicago Bulls	(United States) Horace Grant	Chicago Bulls
1992–93	(United States) Dennis Rodman* (5)	Detroit Pistons	(United States) Larry Nance (3)	Cleveland Cavaliers
1992–93	(Nigeria) **Hakeem Olajuwon*** (6)	Houston Rockets	(United States) David Robinson* (4)	San Antonio Spurs
1992–93	(United States) Michael Jordan* (6)	Chicago Bulls	(United States) Dan Majerle (2)	Phoenix Suns
1992–93	(United States) Joe Dumars* (5)	Detroit Pistons	(United States) John Starks	New York Knicks
1993–94	(United States) Scottie Pippen* (4)	Chicago Bulls	(United States) Dennis Rodman* (6)	San Antonio Spurs
1993–94	(United States) Charles Oakley	New York Knicks	(United States) Horace Grant (2)	Chicago Bulls
1993–94	(Nigeria) **Hakeem Olajuwon*** (7)	Houston Rockets	(United States) David Robinson* (5)	San Antonio Spurs
1993–94	(United States) Gary Payton*	Seattle SuperSonics	(United States) Nate McMillan	Seattle SuperSonics
1993–94	(United States) Mookie Blaylock	Atlanta Hawks	(United States) Latrell Sprewell	Golden State Warriors
1994–95	(United States) Scottie Pippen* (5)	Chicago Bulls	(United States) Horace Grant (3)	Orlando Magic
1994–95	(United States) Dennis Rodman* (7)	San Antonio Spurs	(United States) Derrick McKey	Indiana Pacers
1994–95	(United States) David Robinson* (6)	San Antonio Spurs	(Zaire) **Dikembe Mutombo***	Denver Nuggets
1994–95	(United States) Gary Payton* (2)	Seattle SuperSonics	(United States) John Stockton* (4)	Utah Jazz
1994–95	(United States) Mookie Blaylock (2)	Atlanta Hawks	(United States) Nate McMillan (2)	Seattle SuperSonics
1995–96	(United States) Scottie Pippen* (6)	Chicago Bulls	(United States) Horace Grant (4)	Orlando Magic
1995–96	(United States) Dennis Rodman* (8)	Chicago Bulls	(United States) Derrick McKey (2)	Indiana Pacers
1995–96	(United States) David Robinson* (7)	San Antonio Spurs	(Nigeria) Hakeem Olajuwon* (8)	Houston Rockets
1995–96	(United States) **Gary Payton*** (3)	Seattle SuperSonics	(United States) Mookie Blaylock (3)	Atlanta Hawks
1995–96	(United States) Michael Jordan* (7)	Chicago Bulls	(United States) Bobby Phills	Cleveland Cavaliers
1996–97	(United States) Scottie Pippen* (7)	Chicago Bulls	(United States) Anthony Mason	Charlotte Hornets
1996–97	(United States) Karl Malone* (2)	Utah Jazz	(United States) P. J. Brown	Miami Heat
1996–97	(Zaire) **Dikembe Mutombo*** (2)	Atlanta Hawks	(Nigeria) Hakeem Olajuwon* (9)	Houston Rockets
1996–97	(United States) Michael Jordan* (8)	Chicago Bulls	(United States) Mookie Blaylock (4)	Atlanta Hawks
1996–97	(United States) Gary Payton* (4)	Seattle SuperSonics	(United States) John Stockton* (5)	Utah Jazz
1997–98	(United States) Scottie Pippen* (8)	Chicago Bulls	(United States Virgin Islands) Tim Duncan* (Note: Although Tim Duncan was born in the U.S. Virgin Islands and is a United States citizen, the NBA considers him an international player.)	San Antonio Spurs
1997–98	(United States) Karl Malone* (3)	Utah Jazz	(United States) Charles Oakley (2)	New York Knicks
1997–98	(Democratic Republic of the Congo) **Dikembe Mutombo*** (3)	Atlanta Hawks	(United States) David Robinson* (8)	San Antonio Spurs
1997–98	(United States) Gary Payton* (5)	Seattle SuperSonics	(United States) Mookie Blaylock (5)	Atlanta Hawks
1997–98	(United States) Michael Jordan* (9)	Chicago Bulls	(United States) Eddie Jones	Los Angeles Lakers
1998–99	(United States Virgin Islands) Tim Duncan* (2)	San Antonio Spurs	(United States) P. J. Brown (2)	Miami Heat
1998–99	(United States) Jason Kidd*	Phoenix Suns	(United States) Theo Ratliff	Philadelphia 76ers
1998–99	(United States) **Alonzo Mourning***	Miami Heat	(Democratic Republic of the Congo) Dikembe Mutombo* (4)	Atlanta Hawks
1998–99	(United States) Gary Payton* (6)	Seattle SuperSonics	(United States) Mookie Blaylock (6)	Atlanta Hawks
1998–99	(United States) Karl Malone* (4) (tie)	Utah Jazz	(United States) Eddie Jones (2)	Charlotte Hornets
1998–99	(United States) Scottie Pippen* (9) (tie)	Houston Rockets	(United States) Eddie Jones (2)	Charlotte Hornets
1999–00	(United States Virgin Islands) Tim Duncan* (3)	San Antonio Spurs	(United States) Scottie Pippen* (10)	Portland Trail Blazers
1999–00	(United States) Kevin Garnett*	Minnesota Timberwolves	(United States) Clifford Robinson	Phoenix Suns
1999–00	(United States) **Alonzo Mourning*** (2)	Miami Heat	(United States) Shaquille O'Neal*	Los Angeles Lakers
1999–00	(United States) Gary Payton* (7)	Seattle SuperSonics	(United States) Eddie Jones (3)	Charlotte Hornets
1999–00	(United States) Kobe Bryant*	Los Angeles Lakers	(United States) Jason Kidd* (2)	Phoenix Suns
2000–01	(United States Virgin Islands) Tim Duncan* (4)	San Antonio Spurs	(United States) Bruce Bowen	Miami Heat
2000–01	(United States) Kevin Garnett* (2)	Minnesota Timberwolves	(United States) P. J. Brown (3)	Charlotte Hornets
2000–01	(Democratic Republic of the Congo) **Dikembe Mutombo*** (5)	Philadelphia 76ers	(United States) Shaquille O'Neal* (2)	Los Angeles Lakers
2000–01	(United States) Gary Payton* (8)	Seattle SuperSonics	(United States) Kobe Bryant* (2)	Los Angeles Lakers
2000–01	(United States) Jason Kidd* (3)	Phoenix Suns	(United States) Doug Christie	Sacramento Kings
2001–02	(United States Virgin Islands) Tim Duncan* (5)	San Antonio Spurs	(United States) Bruce Bowen (2)	San Antonio Spurs
2001–02	(United States) Kevin Garnett* (3)	Minnesota Timberwolves	(United States) Clifford Robinson (2)	Detroit Pistons
2001–02	(United States) **Ben Wallace***	Detroit Pistons	(Democratic Republic of the Congo) Dikembe Mutombo* (6)	Philadelphia 76ers
2001–02	(United States) Gary Payton* (9)	Seattle SuperSonics	(United States) Kobe Bryant* (3)	Los Angeles Lakers
2001–02	(United States) Jason Kidd* (4)	New Jersey Nets	(United States) Doug Christie (2)	Sacramento Kings
2002–03	(United States Virgin Islands) Tim Duncan* (6)	San Antonio Spurs	(United States) Ron Artest (Note: Ron Artest changed his name into Metta World Peace on September 16, 2011, and after his playing career changed it again to Metta Sandiford-Artest.)	Indiana Pacers
2002–03	(United States) Kevin Garnett* (4)	Minnesota Timberwolves	(United States) Bruce Bowen (3)	San Antonio Spurs
2002–03	(United States) **Ben Wallace*** (2)	Detroit Pistons	(United States) Shaquille O'Neal* (3)	Los Angeles Lakers
2002–03	(United States) Doug Christie (3)	Sacramento Kings	(United States) Jason Kidd* (5)	New Jersey Nets
2002–03	(United States) Kobe Bryant* (4)	Los Angeles Lakers	(United States) Eric Snow	Philadelphia 76ers
2003–04	(United States) **Ron Artest** (2)	Indiana Pacers	(Russia) Andrei Kirilenko	Utah Jazz
2003–04	(United States) Kevin Garnett* (5)	Minnesota Timberwolves	(United States Virgin Islands) Tim Duncan* (7)	San Antonio Spurs
2003–04	(United States) Ben Wallace* (3)	Detroit Pistons	(United States) Theo Ratliff (2)	Portland Trail Blazers
2003–04	(United States) Bruce Bowen (4)	San Antonio Spurs	(United States) Doug Christie (4)	Sacramento Kings
2003–04	(United States) Kobe Bryant* (5)	Los Angeles Lakers	(United States) Jason Kidd* (6)	New Jersey Nets
2004–05	(United States) **Ben Wallace*** (4)	Detroit Pistons	(United States) Tayshaun Prince	Detroit Pistons
2004–05	(United States) Kevin Garnett* (6)	Minnesota Timberwolves	(United States) Marcus Camby	Denver Nuggets
2004–05	(United States) Bruce Bowen (5)	San Antonio Spurs	(United States) Chauncey Billups*	Detroit Pistons
2004–05	(United States Virgin Islands) Tim Duncan* (8)	San Antonio Spurs	(Russia) Andrei Kirilenko (2)	Utah Jazz
2004–05	(United States) Larry Hughes	Washington Wizards	(United States) Jason Kidd* (7) (tie)	New Jersey Nets
2004–05	(United States) Larry Hughes	Washington Wizards	(United States) Dwyane Wade* (tie)	Miami Heat
2005–06	(United States) Bruce Bowen (6)	San Antonio Spurs	(United States Virgin Islands) Tim Duncan* (9)	San Antonio Spurs
2005–06	(United States) **Ben Wallace*** (5)	Detroit Pistons	(United States) Chauncey Billups* (2)	Detroit Pistons
2005–06	(Russia) Andrei Kirilenko (3)	Utah Jazz	(United States) Kevin Garnett* (7)	Minnesota Timberwolves
2005–06	(United States) Ron Artest (3)	Sacramento Kings	(United States) Marcus Camby (2)	Denver Nuggets
2005–06	(United States) Kobe Bryant* (6) (tie)	Los Angeles Lakers	(United States) Tayshaun Prince (2)	Detroit Pistons
2005–06	(United States) Jason Kidd* (8) (tie)	New Jersey Nets	(United States) Tayshaun Prince (2)	Detroit Pistons
2006–07	(United States) Bruce Bowen (7)	San Antonio Spurs	(United States) Ben Wallace* (6)	Chicago Bulls
2006–07	(United States Virgin Islands) Tim Duncan* (10)	San Antonio Spurs	(United States) Kirk Hinrich	Chicago Bulls
2006–07	(United States) **Marcus Camby** (3)	Denver Nuggets	(United States) Jason Kidd* (9)	New Jersey Nets
2006–07	(United States) Kobe Bryant* (7)	Los Angeles Lakers	(United States) Tayshaun Prince (3)	Detroit Pistons
2006–07	(United States Virgin Islands) Raja Bell (Note: Although Raja Bell was born in the U.S. Virgin Islands and is a United States citizen, the NBA considers him an international player.)	Phoenix Suns	(United States) Kevin Garnett* (8)	Minnesota Timberwolves
2007–08	(United States) **Kevin Garnett*** (9)	Boston Celtics	(United States) Shane Battier	Houston Rockets
2007–08	(United States) Kobe Bryant* (8)	Los Angeles Lakers	(United States) Chris Paul^{†}	New Orleans Hornets
2007–08	(United States) Marcus Camby (4)	Denver Nuggets	(United States) Dwight Howard*	Orlando Magic
2007–08	(United States) Bruce Bowen (8)	San Antonio Spurs	(United States) Tayshaun Prince (4)	Detroit Pistons
2007–08	(United States Virgin Islands) Tim Duncan* (11)	San Antonio Spurs	(United States Virgin Islands) Raja Bell (2)	Phoenix Suns
2008–09	(United States) **Dwight Howard*** (2)	Orlando Magic	(United States Virgin Islands) Tim Duncan* (12)	San Antonio Spurs
2008–09	(United States) Kobe Bryant* (9)	Los Angeles Lakers	(United States) Dwyane Wade* (2)	Miami Heat
2008–09	(United States) LeBron James^	Cleveland Cavaliers	(United States) Rajon Rondo	Boston Celtics
2008–09	(United States) Chris Paul^{†} (2)	New Orleans Hornets	(United States) Shane Battier (2)	Houston Rockets
2008–09	(United States) Kevin Garnett* (10)	Boston Celtics	(United States) Ron Artest (4)	Houston Rockets
2009–10	(United States) **Dwight Howard*** (3)	Orlando Magic	(United States Virgin Islands) Tim Duncan* (13)	San Antonio Spurs
2009–10	(United States) Rajon Rondo (2)	Boston Celtics	(United States) Dwyane Wade* (3)	Miami Heat
2009–10	(United States) LeBron James^ (2)	Cleveland Cavaliers	(United States) Josh Smith	Atlanta Hawks
2009–10	(United States) Kobe Bryant* (10)	Los Angeles Lakers	(Brazil) Anderson Varejão	Cleveland Cavaliers
2009–10	(United States) Gerald Wallace	Charlotte Bobcats	(Switzerland) Thabo Sefolosha	Oklahoma City Thunder
2010–11	(United States) **Dwight Howard*** (4)	Orlando Magic	(United States) Tony Allen	Memphis Grizzlies
2010–11	(United States) Rajon Rondo (3)	Boston Celtics	(United States) Chris Paul^{†} (3)	New Orleans Hornets
2010–11	(United States) LeBron James^ (3)	Miami Heat	(United States) Tyson Chandler	Dallas Mavericks
2010–11	(United States) Kobe Bryant* (11)	Los Angeles Lakers	(United States) Andre Iguodala	Philadelphia 76ers
2010–11	(United States) Kevin Garnett* (11)	Boston Celtics	(United States) Joakim Noah	Chicago Bulls
2011–12	(United States) LeBron James^ (4)	Miami Heat	(United States) Kevin Garnett* (12)	Boston Celtics
2011–12	(Republic of the Congo) Serge Ibaka	Oklahoma City Thunder	(United Kingdom) Luol Deng (Note: Luol Deng, who was born in Sudan (now South Sudan), was raised in Great Britain, became a naturalized British citizen, and represented England and Great Britain internationally.)	Chicago Bulls
2011–12	(United States) Dwight Howard* (5)	Orlando Magic	(United States) **Tyson Chandler** (2)	New York Knicks
2011–12	(United States) Chris Paul^{†} (4)	Los Angeles Clippers	(United States) Rajon Rondo (4)	Boston Celtics
2011–12	(United States) Tony Allen (2)	Memphis Grizzlies	(United States) Kobe Bryant* (12)	Los Angeles Lakers
2012–13	(United States) LeBron James^ (5)	Miami Heat	(United States Virgin Islands) Tim Duncan* (14)	San Antonio Spurs
2012–13	(Republic of the Congo) Serge Ibaka (2)	Oklahoma City Thunder	(United States) Paul George^	Indiana Pacers
2012–13	(United States) Tyson Chandler (3) (tie)	New York Knicks	(Spain) **Marc Gasol**	Memphis Grizzlies
2012–13	(United States) Joakim Noah (2) (tie)	Chicago Bulls	(Spain) **Marc Gasol**	Memphis Grizzlies
2012–13	(United States) Tony Allen (3)	Memphis Grizzlies	(United States) Avery Bradley	Boston Celtics
2012–13	(United States) Chris Paul^{†} (5)	Los Angeles Clippers	(United States) Mike Conley^{†}	Memphis Grizzlies
2013–14	(United States) **Joakim Noah** (3)	Chicago Bulls	(United States) LeBron James^ (6)	Miami Heat
2013–14	(United States) Paul George^ (2)	Indiana Pacers	(United States) Patrick Beverley	Houston Rockets
2013–14	(United States) Chris Paul^{†} (6)	Los Angeles Clippers	(United States) Jimmy Butler^	Chicago Bulls
2013–14	(Republic of the Congo) Serge Ibaka (3)	Oklahoma City Thunder	(United States) Kawhi Leonard^	San Antonio Spurs
2013–14	(United States) Andre Iguodala (2)	Golden State Warriors	(Jamaica) Roy Hibbert	Indiana Pacers
2014–15	(United States) **Kawhi Leonard**^ (2)	San Antonio Spurs	(United States) Anthony Davis^	New Orleans Pelicans
2014–15	(United States) Draymond Green^	Golden State Warriors	(United States) Jimmy Butler^ (2)	Chicago Bulls
2014–15	(United States) Tony Allen (4)	Memphis Grizzlies	(Australia) Andrew Bogut	Golden State Warriors
2014–15	(United States) DeAndre Jordan^	Los Angeles Clippers	(United States) John Wall	Washington Wizards
2014–15	(United States) Chris Paul^{†} (7)	Los Angeles Clippers	(United States Virgin Islands) Tim Duncan* (15)	San Antonio Spurs
2015–16	(United States) **Kawhi Leonard**^ (3)	San Antonio Spurs	(United States) Paul Millsap	Atlanta Hawks
2015–16	(United States) Draymond Green^ (2)	Golden State Warriors	(United States) Paul George^ (3)	Indiana Pacers
2015–16	(United States) DeAndre Jordan^ (2)	Los Angeles Clippers	(United States) Hassan Whiteside	Miami Heat
2015–16	(United States) Avery Bradley (2)	Boston Celtics	(United States) Tony Allen (5)	Memphis Grizzlies
2015–16	(United States) Chris Paul^{†} (8)	Los Angeles Clippers	(United States) Jimmy Butler^ (3)	Chicago Bulls
2016–17	(United States) **Draymond Green**^ (3)	Golden State Warriors	(United States) Tony Allen (6)	Memphis Grizzlies
2016–17	(France) Rudy Gobert^	Utah Jazz	(United States) Danny Green	San Antonio Spurs
2016–17	(United States) Kawhi Leonard^ (4)	San Antonio Spurs	(United States) Anthony Davis^ (2)	New Orleans Pelicans
2016–17	(United States) Chris Paul^{†} (9)	Los Angeles Clippers	(United States) André Roberson	Oklahoma City Thunder
2016–17	(United States) Patrick Beverley (2)	Houston Rockets	(Greece) Giannis Antetokounmpo^	Milwaukee Bucks
2017–18	(France) **Rudy Gobert**^ (2)	Utah Jazz	(Cameroon) Joel Embiid^	Philadelphia 76ers
2017–18	(United States) Anthony Davis^ (3)	New Orleans Pelicans	(United States) Draymond Green^ (4)	Golden State Warriors
2017–18	(United States) Victor Oladipo^{§}	Indiana Pacers	(Dominican Republic) Al Horford^	Boston Celtics
2017–18	(United States) Jrue Holiday^	New Orleans Pelicans	(United States) Dejounte Murray^	San Antonio Spurs
2017–18	(United States) Robert Covington	Philadelphia 76ers	(United States) Jimmy Butler^ (4)	Minnesota Timberwolves
2018–19	(France) **Rudy Gobert**^ (3)	Utah Jazz	(United States) Jrue Holiday^ (2)	New Orleans Pelicans
2018–19	(United States) Paul George^ (4)	Oklahoma City Thunder	(United States) Klay Thompson^	Golden State Warriors
2018–19	(Greece) Giannis Antetokounmpo^ (2)	Milwaukee Bucks	(Cameroon) Joel Embiid^ (2)	Philadelphia 76ers
2018–19	(United States) Marcus Smart^	Boston Celtics	(United States) Draymond Green^ (5)	Golden State Warriors
2018–19	(United States) Eric Bledsoe	Milwaukee Bucks	(United States) Kawhi Leonard^ (5)	Toronto Raptors
2019–20	(Greece) **Giannis Antetokounmpo**^ (3)	Milwaukee Bucks	(United States) Kawhi Leonard^ (6)	Los Angeles Clippers
2019–20	(United States) Anthony Davis^ (4)	Los Angeles Lakers	(United States) Brook Lopez^	Milwaukee Bucks
2019–20	(Australia) Ben Simmons^	Philadelphia 76ers	(United States) Bam Adebayo^	Miami Heat
2019–20	(France) Rudy Gobert^ (4)	Utah Jazz	(United States) Patrick Beverley (3)	Los Angeles Clippers
2019–20	(United States) Marcus Smart^ (2)	Boston Celtics	(United States) Eric Bledsoe (2)	Milwaukee Bucks
2020–21	(France) **Rudy Gobert**^ (5)	Utah Jazz	(United States) Bam Adebayo^ (2)	Miami Heat
2020–21	(Australia) Ben Simmons^ (2)	Philadelphia 76ers	(United States) Jimmy Butler^ (5)	Miami Heat
2020–21	(United States) Draymond Green^ (6)	Golden State Warriors	(Cameroon) Joel Embiid^ (3)	Philadelphia 76ers
2020–21	(United States) Jrue Holiday^ (3)	Milwaukee Bucks	(Australia) Matisse Thybulle^	Philadelphia 76ers
2020–21	(Greece) Giannis Antetokounmpo^ (4)	Milwaukee Bucks	(United States) Kawhi Leonard^ (7)	Los Angeles Clippers
2021–22	(United States) **Marcus Smart**^ (3)	Boston Celtics	(United States) Bam Adebayo^ (3)	Miami Heat
2021–22	(United States) Mikal Bridges^	Phoenix Suns	(United States) Jrue Holiday^ (4)	Milwaukee Bucks
2021–22	(France) Rudy Gobert^ (6)	Utah Jazz	(Australia) Matisse Thybulle^ (2)	Philadelphia 76ers
2021–22	(Greece) Giannis Antetokounmpo^ (5)	Milwaukee Bucks	(United States) Robert Williams III^	Boston Celtics
2021–22	(United States) Jaren Jackson Jr.^	Memphis Grizzlies	(United States) Draymond Green^ (7)	Golden State Warriors
2022–23	(United States) **Jaren Jackson Jr.**^ (2)	Memphis Grizzlies	(United States) Derrick White^	Boston Celtics
2022–23	(United States) Jrue Holiday^ (5)	Milwaukee Bucks	(United States) Draymond Green^ (8)	Golden State Warriors
2022–23	(United States) Brook Lopez^ (2)	Milwaukee Bucks	(United Kingdom) O.G. Anunoby^	Toronto Raptors
2022–23	(United States) Evan Mobley^	Cleveland Cavaliers	(Canada) Dillon Brooks^	Memphis Grizzlies
2022–23	(United States) Alex Caruso^	Chicago Bulls	(United States) Bam Adebayo^ (4)	Miami Heat
2023–24	(France) **Rudy Gobert**^ (7)	Minnesota Timberwolves	(United States) Alex Caruso^ (2)	Chicago Bulls
2023–24	(France) Victor Wembanyama^	San Antonio Spurs	(United States) Jalen Suggs^	Orlando Magic
2023–24	(United States) Bam Adebayo^ (5)	Miami Heat	(United States) Derrick White^ (2)	Boston Celtics
2023–24	(United States) Herbert Jones^	New Orleans Pelicans	(United States) Jaden McDaniels^	Minnesota Timberwolves
2023–24	(United States) Anthony Davis^ (5)	Los Angeles Lakers	(United States) Jrue Holiday^ (6)	Boston Celtics
2024–25	(United States) **Evan Mobley**^ (2)	Cleveland Cavaliers	(Croatia) Ivica Zubac^	Los Angeles Clippers
2024–25	(Australia) Dyson Daniels^	Atlanta Hawks	(United States) Jaren Jackson Jr.^ (3)	Memphis Grizzlies
2024–25	(Canada) Luguentz Dort^	Oklahoma City Thunder	(United States) Jalen Williams^	Oklahoma City Thunder
2024–25	(United States) Draymond Green^ (9)	Golden State Warriors	(Belgium) Toumani Camara^	Portland Trail Blazers
2024–25	(United States) Amen Thompson^	Houston Rockets	(France) Rudy Gobert^ (8)	Minnesota Timberwolves
2025–26	(France) **Victor Wembanyama**^ (2)	San Antonio Spurs	(United States) Bam Adebayo^ (6)	Miami Heat
2025–26	(United States) Chet Holmgren^	Oklahoma City Thunder	(United States) Scottie Barnes^	Toronto Raptors
2025–26	(United States) Ausar Thompson^	Detroit Pistons	(United States) Cason Wallace^	Oklahoma City Thunder
2025–26	(France) Rudy Gobert^ (9)	Minnesota Timberwolves	(Australia) Dyson Daniels^ (2)	Atlanta Hawks
2025–26	(United States) Derrick White^ (3)	Boston Celtics	(United Kingdom) O.G. Anunoby^ (2)	New York Knicks

== Most selections ==
The following table only lists players with at least nine total selections.

*	Denotes players inducted to the Naismith Memorial Basketball Hall of Fame
^	Denotes players who are still active
†	Not yet eligible for Hall of Fame consideration (Note: A player is not eligible for induction into the Naismith Memorial Basketball Hall of Fame until he has been fully retired for two calendar years.)

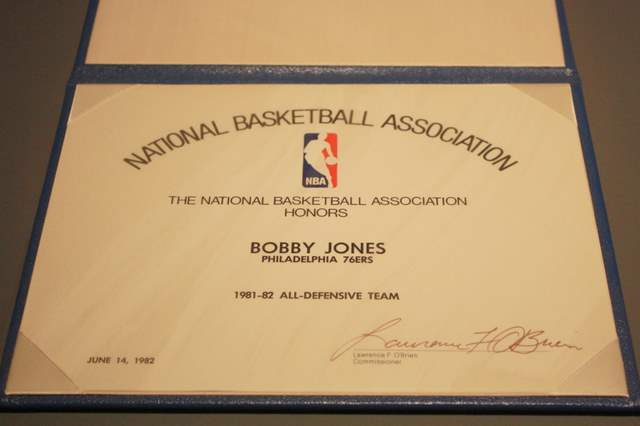
Certificate presented to Bobby Jones for All-Defensive honors in 1981–82.

Player	Pos	Total	First Team	Second Team	Defensive Player of the Year	Seasons
(United States Virgin Islands) Tim Duncan*	F/C	15	8	7	0	19
(United States) Kevin Garnett*	F	12	9	3	1	21
(United States) Kobe Bryant*	G	12	9	3	0	20
(United States) Kareem Abdul-Jabbar*	C	11	5	6	0	20
(United States) Scottie Pippen*	F	10	8	2	0	17
(United States) Gary Payton*	G	9	9	0	1	17
(United States) Michael Jordan*	G	9	9	0	1	15
(France) Rudy Gobert^	C	9	8	1	4	13
(United States) Bobby Jones*	F	9	8	1	0	12
(United States) Chris Paul^{†}	G	9	7	2	0	21
(United States) Dennis Johnson*	G	9	6	3	0	14
(Nigeria) Hakeem Olajuwon*	C	9	5	4	2	18
(United States) Draymond Green^	F	9	5	4	1	14
(United States) Jason Kidd*	G	9	4	5	0	19

== See also ==
- All-NBA Team
- List of NBA regular season records
