= Billy Knight =

American basketball player and executive (born 1952)

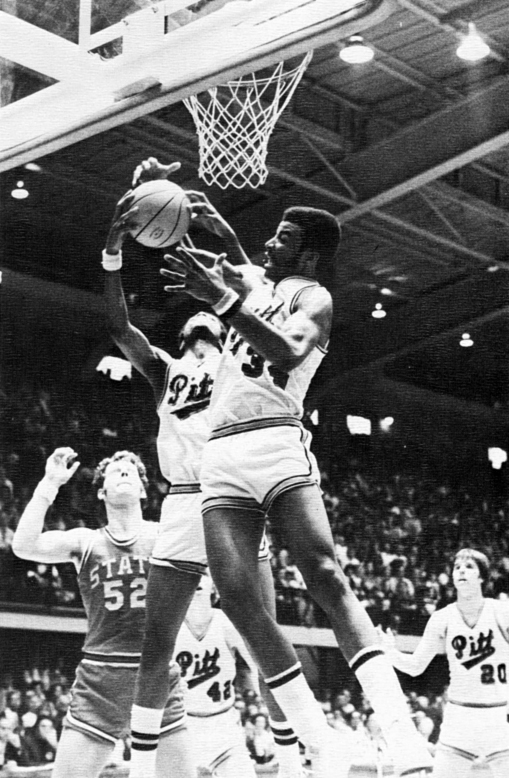
- Knight (front) in the 1974 Elite Eight with Pittsburgh

Personal information
- Born: June 9, 1952 (age 74) Braddock, Pennsylvania, U.S.
- Listed height: 6 ft 6 in (1.98 m)
- Listed weight: 195 lb (88 kg)

Career information
- High school: Braddock (Braddock, Pennsylvania)
- College: Pittsburgh (1971–1974)
- NBA draft: 1974: 2nd round, 21st overall pick
- Drafted by: Los Angeles Lakers
- Playing career: 1974–1985
- Position: Shooting guard / small forward
- Number: 25, 35

Career history
- 1974–1977: Indiana Pacers
- 1977–1978: Buffalo Braves
- 1978–1979: Boston Celtics
- 1979–1983: Indiana Pacers
- 1983–1984: Kansas City Kings
- 1984–1985: San Antonio Spurs
- 1985–1986: CSP Limoges

Career highlights
- 2x NBA All-Star (1977, 1978); ABA All-Star (1976); All-ABA First Team (1976); ABA All-Rookie First Team (1975); Consensus second-team All-American (1974); No. 34 retired by Pittsburgh Panthers

Career ABA and NBA statistics
- Points: 13,901 (16.9 ppg)
- Rebounds: 4,377 (5.3 rpg)
- Assists: 1,862 (2.3 apg)
- Stats at NBA.com
- Stats at Basketball Reference

William R. Knight (born June 9, 1952) is an American former professional basketball player and executive. Playing with the Indiana Pacers in both the American Basketball Association (ABA) and later the National Basketball Association (NBA), he was both an ABA and NBA All-Star. He played college basketball with the Pittsburgh Panthers, who retired his No. 34.

In college, Knight was a consensus second-team All-American in 1974. He began his pro career with the Indiana Pacers, earning ABA All-Rookie First Team honors in 1975. He continued with the Pacers in the NBA, and he also played in the league for the Buffalo Braves, Boston Celtics, Kansas City Kings and San Antonio Spurs. Knight finished his playing career with a season in France. He became an executive with the Pacers and the Vancouver/Memphis Grizzlies. He last served as the executive vice president and general manager of the Atlanta Hawks from 2003 to 2008.

== Early life ==
Knight was born and raised in Braddock, Pennsylvania, a suburb of Pittsburgh, where he attended Braddock High School. He was a member of the 1970 Section High School Basketball Champions Braddock Tigers.

== University of Pittsburgh ==
A 6'6" guard/forward, he then attended the University of Pittsburgh (Pitt), where he starred, and along with Mickey Martin and Kirk Bruce, Knight led the Panthers to the East Regional Finals in the 1974 NCAA Men's Division I Basketball Tournament, where they lost to eventual NCAA Champion North Carolina State, in a matchup between Knight and NCSU's David Thompson. The game was played in Raleigh, North Carolina. NCSU went on to defeat UCLA & Marquette for the National title in Greensboro, North Carolina.

Knight's performance during the 1973–1974 season, in which Pitt went 25–4 and won a school record, 22 games in a row, earned him 2nd team All-American team status. He is considered one of Pitt's best players ever and was voted to Pitt's all-time starting five.

Knight had his number 34 jersey retired by the University of Pittsburgh on February 20, 1989.

== Professional career ==
Knight spent 11 seasons, from 1974 to 1985, in the ABA and NBA as a member of the Indiana Pacers, Buffalo Braves, Boston Celtics, Kansas City Kings, and San Antonio Spurs. He scored 13,901 points in his ABA/NBA career and appeared in two All-Star games as well as one ABA all-star game.

=== Indiana Pacers (1975–77, first stint) ===
Knight's best years were with the Indiana Pacers, after being selected by both the Pacers and the LA Lakers in the player draft. Knight was voted 1st team ABA All-Star for the 1975–1976 season, his second year in the league after averaging 28.1 ppg. This was the last year of the ABA before the Indiana Pacers merged into the NBA. The following year Knight maintained All-Star status, this time in the NBA after averaging 26.6 ppg — second best in the league that season.

=== Buffalo Braves (1978) ===
Following a brief but successful tenure with the Buffalo Braves in the 1978 season, Knight's play slowly began to decline. A primary reason for Knight's initial success in the NBA was the poor state of the Braves franchise upon his arrival. Having recently lost their MVP talent Bob McAdoo, the directionless Braves won only 27 games in Knight's lone season with the franchise. Knight's averages of 23 points and 7 rebounds would nevertheless be enough for the forward to make his third and final career all-star team.

=== Boston Celtics (1978–79) ===
Knight departed from Buffalo via a trade that sent Knight, fellow all star Tiny Archibald, Marvin Barnes, and a 1981 2nd-round draft pick that would become Danny Ainge to the Boston Celtics in exchange for Sidney Wicks, Kermit Washington, Freeman Williams, and Kevin Kunnert. In Boston, Knight's scoring numbers dropped from 22.9 to 13.9.

=== Indiana Pacers (1979–83, second stint), and later career ===
After less than one year in Boston, Knight was traded back to the Pacers for rookie Rick Robey. On November 11, 1980, Knight scored 52 points, grabbed 5 rebounds, and recorded 5 steals during a 119–113 win over the San Antonio Spurs. The 52 point total was a career-high for Knight, and resulted in him winning NBA Player of the Week. Knight remained a reliable player throughout the remainder of his career, averaging between 12 and 18 points for the next five consecutive seasons. He ended his career as a member of the San Antonio Spurs, where he played alongside future Hall of Famers George Gervin and Artis Gilmore for 52 games.

Knight is the Indiana Pacers 3rd all-time leading scorer and is in several other Top 5 all-time categories for the Pacers. His 1976 statline of 28.1 points per game still remains the highest points average by a Pacer in a single season. Knight is one of twenty-three players in NBA/ABA history to average 28 points and 10 rebounds in a season, joining the likes of Wilt Chamberlain (x7), Kareem Abdul-Jabbar (x5), Shaquille O'Neal (x5), Elgin Baylor (x4), Karl Malone (x4), Giannis Antetokounmpo (x3), Bob McAdoo (x3), Bob Pettit (x3), Oscar Robertson (x3), Anthony Davis (x2), Joel Embiid (x2), Julius Erving (x2), Elvin Hayes (x2), Spencer Haywood (x2), Dan Issel (x2), Charles Barkley, Walt Bellamy, Larry Bird, Patrick Ewing, Moses Malone, George McGinnis, George Mikan, and David Robinson. Among these players, Knight remains the only one out of the eligible names to put up such a statline and not be inducted into the Naismith Memorial Basketball Hall of Fame. Furthermore, himself, Oscar Robertson, Julius Erving and Larry Bird are the only four to achieve such a statline while not playing at the center or power forward position. A versatile wing player, it was commonplace for Knight to switch between playing the small forward and shooting guard positions over the course of his eleven-year professional career.

== Front office career ==
Prior to joining the Hawks organization in 2002, Knight worked as a front office executive with the Pacers and the Vancouver/Memphis Grizzlies.

=== Atlanta Hawks (2003–08) ===
Knight's reign as GM of the Atlanta Hawks was marred by a mix of successful and poor draft selections. In 2004, he drafted Josh Childress over future All-Stars Luol Deng and Andre Iguodala. Childress wound up leaving the Atlanta Hawks to join a Greek franchise Olympiakos. In 2005, Billy Knight drafted UNC freshman phenom Marvin Williams over consensus top point guard and future 9-time All Star and 7-time All-NBA team point guard Chris Paul despite the roster's need for a point guard and glut of young players at the swing position between Josh Childress and Josh Smith. 2006 led to the selection of Sheldon Williams, an undersized power forward, despite glaring needs at guard and future all-star Brandon Roy available.

On May 7, 2008, Knight stepped down as Hawks GM. When announcing his resignation from the team he stated that he had left the Hawks "in much better shape than it was in when I took over."

== Personal life ==
Knight currently lives in Atlanta, and continues to play tennis, a game he enjoys and began playing around the age of 30.

== ABA/NBA career statistics ==
Legend
GP	Games played	GS	Games started	MPG	Minutes per game
FG%	Field goal percentage	3P%	3-point field goal percentage	FT%	Free throw percentage
RPG	Rebounds per game	APG	Assists per game	SPG	Steals per game
BPG	Blocks per game	PPG	Points per game	**Bold**	Career high

*	Led the league
‡	ABA record

=== Regular season ===
Year	Team	GP	GS	MPG	FG%	3P%	FT%	RPG	APG	SPG	BPG	PPG
1974–75	Indiana (ABA)	80	–	32.0	.534	.250	.799	7.9	2.1	1.4	**.4**	17.1
1975–76	Indiana (ABA)	70	–	39.6	.494	.400	.828	**10.1**	**3.7**	1.3	.3	**28.1**
1976–77	Indiana	78	–	40.0	.493	–	.816	7.5	3.3	**1.5**	.2	26.6
1977–78	Buffalo	53	–	**40.7**	.494	–	.809	7.2	3.0	**1.5**	.2	22.9
1978–79	Boston	40	–	28.0	.502	–	.808	4.3	1.7	.8	.1	13.9
1978–79	Indiana	39	–	25.0	**.556**	–	.873	4.5	2.2	.8	.1	14.7
1979–80	Indiana	75	–	25.5	.533	.267	.809	4.8	2.1	1.1	.1	13.1
1980–81	Indiana	**82**	–	29.1	.533	.158	.832	5.0	1.9	1.0	.1	17.5
1981–82	Indiana	81	19	22.3	.495	.281	.826	3.2	1.5	.8	.2	12.3
1982–83	Indiana	80	54	28.3	.520	.158	.841	4.1	2.4	.8	.1	17.1
1983–84	Kansas City	75	39	25.1	.491	.286	.859	3.4	2.1	.7	.1	12.8
1984–85	Kansas City	16	0	11.8	.449	**1.000**	.813	1.4	1.3	.1	.1	4.8
1984–85	San Antonio	52	1	11.8	.439	.417	**.895**	1.8	1.1	.3	.0	6.0
Career ABA		150		35.6	.510	.323	.818	8.9	2.8	1.4	0.3	22.3
Career NBA		671	113	27.4	.506	.274	.830	4.5	2.1	0.9	0.1	15.7
Career total		821	113	28.9	.507	.284	.827	5.3	2.3	1.0	.2	16.9
All-Star		2	0	17.5	.526	.000	1.000	7.5	1.0	1.0	.0	12.0

=== Playoffs ===
Year	Team	GP	GS	MPG	FG%	3P%	FT%	RPG	APG	SPG	BPG	PPG
1975	Indiana(ABA)	**18**	–	42.4	**.568**	.000	.845	8.9	2.4	**.9**	**.1**	24.1
1976	Indiana(ABA)	3	–	**47.7**	.554	.000	.864	**10.7**	**4.0**	.7	.0	**33.7**
1981	Indiana	2	–	35.5	.533	–	.625	6.0	2.5	.5	.0	18.5
1984	Kansas City	3	–	12.3	.333	–	**1.000**	1.0	.7	.0	.0	6.0
1985	San Antonio	5	0	9.0	.533	.000	–	1.2	.6	.4	.0	3.2
Career ABA		21		43.1	.565‡	.000	.849	9.1	2.6	0.9	0.0	25.5
Career NBA		10		15.3	.464	.000	.700	2.1	1.0	0.3	0.0	7.1
Career total		31	0	34.2	.550	.000	.837	6.9	2.1	.7	.0	19.5
