= Don Buse =

American basketball player (born 1950)

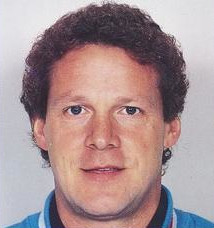
- Buse, circa 1986

Personal information
- Born: August 10, 1950 (age 76) Huntingburg, Indiana, U.S.
- Listed height: 6 ft 4 in (1.93 m)
- Listed weight: 190 lb (86 kg)

Career information
- High school: Holland (Holland, Indiana)
- College: Evansville (1969–1972)
- NBA draft: 1972: 3rd round, 34th overall pick
- Drafted by: Phoenix Suns
- Playing career: 1972–1985
- Position: Point guard
- Number: 10, 11

Career history
- 1972–1977: Indiana Pacers
- 1977–1980: Phoenix Suns
- 1980–1982: Indiana Pacers
- 1982–1983: Portland Trail Blazers
- 1983–1985: Kansas City Kings

Career highlights
- ABA champion (1973); NBA All-Star (1977); ABA All-Star (1976); All-ABA Second Team (1976); ABA steals leader (1976); 4× NBA All-Defensive First Team (1977–1980); 2× ABA All-Defensive First Team (1975, 1976); NBA assists leader (1977); NBA steals leader (1977); NCAA Division II champion (1971); No. 10 jersey retired by Evansville Purple Aces

Career statistics
- Points: 6,890 (7.1 ppg)
- Assists: 4,425 (4.6 apg)
- Steals: 1,818 (2.0 spg)
- Stats at NBA.com
- Stats at Basketball Reference

Donald R. Buse (/ˈbuːziː/ BOO-zee; born August 10, 1950) is an American former professional basketball player. A 6-foot-4-inch (1.93 m) point guard from the University of Evansville, he played 13 seasons (1972–1985) in the American Basketball Association (ABA) and National Basketball Association (NBA) as a member of the Indiana Pacers, the Phoenix Suns, the Portland Trail Blazers, and the Kansas City Kings.

== High school ==
Named an Indiana All-Star in 1968, following a stellar career at Holland High School, which consolidated with Huntingburg High School to become Southridge High School. He started from 1964 to 1968, and led the Dutchmen to Sectional Championships in 1967 and 1968. They finished the 1968 season undefeated but lost the Regional Championship game to perennial power Jeffersonville High School. Buse was selected to the Indiana All-Star Team in 1968.

== College ==
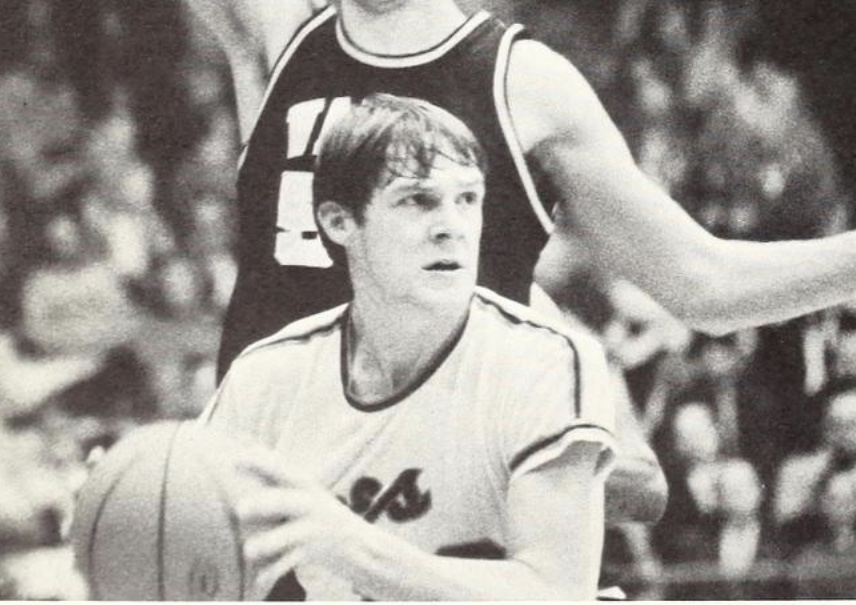
Buse playing for Evansville in 1971

- Played for legendary Arad McCutchan at Evansville; leading the Purple Aces to a four-year record of 68–42 and the 1971 NCAA Men's Division II Basketball Championship title.
- Ranks # 13 all-time in scoring (1,426 pts.)
- Ranks # 9 all-time in scoring average (16.9)
- Ranks # 9 all-time in field goal percentage (.497)
- Ranks # 7 all-time in free throws (364)
- Ranks # 7 all-time in free throw percentage (78.5)
- Selected as 1st Team All-Indiana Collegiate Conference in 1970–71 and 1971–72.
- Selected as 1st Team All-District College Division (NABC) in 1972.
- Selected as 3rd Team All-American College Division (UPI) in 1972.
- Selected as 3rd Team All-American College Division (NABC) in 1972.
- Selected as Honorable Mention All-American College Division (AP) in 1972.
- Selected as 1st Team All-American College Division (Universal Sports) in 1972.
- Retired his number (#10)
- Selected to the USA Basketball Team in 1971; Pan-American Games participant.
- Invited to U.S. Olympic Trials in 1972; declined invitation for professional basketball career.

== Career ==
Don Buse was selected for the NCAA squad to compete for positions on the 1972 U.S. Olympic basketball team, but he was replaced by Jim Forbes as he signed a professional contract.

Buse went on to play professionally for the Indiana Pacers, the Phoenix Suns, the Portland Trail Blazers, and the Kansas City Kings.

Buse was known for his dependable ball-handling, tight defense, and clutch-shooting, and he appeared in two All-Star games (one in the ABA in 1976; one in the NBA in 1977) during the course of his career. His best season occurred in 1975–76, when he led the ABA in both steals per game (4.12) and assists per game (8.2) while also contributing a career high 12.5 points per game. In the next season, his first in the NBA, Buse again led all players in steals per game (3.47) and assists per game (8.5).

In 1979, Buse helped take the Suns deep into the playoffs on a team with notable players, such as Paul Westphal, Walter Davis, Truck Robinson and Alvan Adams.

Buse was an All-Defensive Team member six times, from the 1974–75 season through the 1979–80 season. The first two were in the ABA and the final four were in the NBA.

After Buse's career he was selected to several All-time teams, including:

- Selected to the Indiana Basketball Hall of Fame 'Silver Anniversary' Team in 1993.
- Selected to the Indiana Basketball Hall of Fame in 1998.
- Selected as one of Indiana's Greatest 50 players in 1999.
- Selected to the All-Time University of Evansville Basketball Team in 2005.

== Career statistics ==
Legend
GP	Games played	GS	Games started	MPG	Minutes per game
FG%	Field goal percentage	3P%	3-point field goal percentage	FT%	Free throw percentage
RPG	Rebounds per game	APG	Assists per game	SPG	Steals per game
BPG	Blocks per game	PPG	Points per game	**Bold**	Career high
*	Led the league

†	Denotes seasons in which Buse's team won an ABA championship
*	ABA record

=== Regular season ===
Year	Team	GP	GS	MPG	FG%	3P%	FT%	RPG	APG	SPG	BPG	PPG
1972–73†	Indiana (ABA)	77	13	19.3	.453	.208	.752	2.7	2.9	1.4	.1	5.4
1973–74	Indiana (ABA)	77	41	24.4	.398	.336	.686	3.3	3.4	1.9	.3	5.5
1974–75	Indiana (ABA)	80	63	29.6	.432	.309	.797	3.4	4.2	2.1	.2	6.5
1975–76	Indiana (ABA)	**84**	84	**40.2***	.451	.346	.814	**3.8**	8.2*	**4.1***	**.4**	**12.5**
1976–77	Indiana (NBA)	81	76	36.4	.416	—	.786	3.3	**8.5***	3.5*	.2	8.0
1977–78	Phoenix (NBA)	82	**82**	31.1	.458	—	.824	3.0	4.8	2.3	.2	8.4
1978–79	Phoenix (NBA)	82*	**82***	31.0	**.495**	—	.769	2.6	4.3	1.9	.2	7.8
1979–80	Phoenix (NBA)	81	—	30.9	.443	.241	.664	2.9	4.0	1.6	.1	7.7
1980–81	Indiana (NBA)	58	4	18.9	.397	.328	.769	1.4	2.4	1.3	.1	5.1
1981–82	Indiana (NBA)	82	78	30.8	.455	**.386**	.813	2.7	5.0	2.0	.3	9.7
1982–83	Portland (NBA)	41	1	15.7	.396	.257	**.891**	1.3	2.8	1.1	.0	4.7
1983–84	Kansas City (NBA)	76	10	17.5	.426	.305	.788	1.5	4.0	1.1	.0	5.0
1984–85	Kansas City (NBA)	65	14	14.4	.404	.356	.767	.9	3.1	.6	.0	3.4
Career ABA		318	201	28.6	.437	.327	.777	3.3	4.7	2.4	.2	7.6
Career NBA		648	347	26.3	.442	.333	.780	2.3	4.5	1.8	.1	6.9
Career total		966	548	27.1	.440	.330	.779	2.7	4.6	2.0	.2	7.1
All-Star		2	0	16.5	.444	.500	—	1.5	4.0	2.0	.0	4.5

=== Playoffs ===
Year	Team	GP	GS	MPG	FG%	3P%	FT%	RPG	APG	SPG	BPG	PPG
1973†	Indiana (ABA)	14	—	11.6	.356	.000	.619	1.8	1.2	—	—	3.2
1974	Indiana (ABA)	14	—	23.6	.441	.318	.667	2.6	2.6	2.1	.1	5.2
1975	Indiana (ABA)	**18**	—	32.0	.379	.231	.533	3.2	4.4	**2.5**	**.3**	5.6
1976	Indiana (ABA)	3	—	**46.0**	**.455**	.333	**1.000**	**4.7**	**8.7**	2.3	.0	**12.3**
1978	Phoenix (NBA)	2	—	38.0	.364	—	—	2.5	2.0	2.0	.0	4.0
1979	Phoenix (NBA)	15	—	34.1	.405	—	.727	3.7	3.5	1.5	**.3**	7.9
1980	Phoenix (NBA)	8	—	29.5	.438	.385	.636	2.6	5.5	.8	.0	8.5
1981	Indiana (NBA)	2	—	17.5	.125	.250	**1.000**	2.5	3.5	1.5	.0	2.5
1983	Portland (NBA)	5	—	6.2	.250	—	.750	.4	1.4	.0	.0	1.4
1984	Kansas City (NBA)	3	—	16.7	.438	**.500**	.667	1.0	3.7	.3	**.3**	7.0
Career ABA		49	—	24.7	.402	.250	.609	2.7	3.2	2.3‡	.2	5.2
Career NBA		35	—	26.9	.399	.391	.714	2.6	3.6	1.1	.2	6.5
Career total		84	—	25.6	.400	.287	.658	2.7	3.4	1.7	.2	5.7

== See also ==
- List of NBA annual assists leaders
- List of NBA annual steals leaders
- List of NBA single-season steals per game leaders
- List of NBA single-game steals leaders
