= 1958–59 NCAA University Division men's basketball season =

Men's university basketball season

- Preseason AP No. 1: None
- NCAA Tournament: 1959
- Tournament dates: March 7 – 21, 1959
- National Championship: Freedom Hall; Louisville, Kentucky
- NCAA Champions: California Golden Bears
- Helms National Champions: California Golden Bears
- Other champions: St. John's Redmen (NIT)
- Player of the Year (Helms): Oscar Robertson, Cincinnati Bearcats

The 1958–59 NCAA University Division men's basketball season began in December 1958, progressed through the regular season and conference tournaments, and concluded with the 1959 NCAA University Division basketball tournament championship game on March 21, 1959, at Freedom Hall in Louisville, Kentucky. The California Golden Bears won their first NCAA national championship with a 71–70 victory over the West Virginia Mountainneers.

== Season headlines ==
- The Middle Atlantic Conference began NCAA University Division play, with 10 of its members competing as University Division schools.
- In the 1959 NCAA University Division basketball tournament, Eddie Hickey of Marquette became the first head coach to take three different teams to the NCAA tournament. He had done it previously with Creighton in 1941 in his first year as head coach and with Saint Louis in 1952.
- The Pacific Coast Conference disbanded at the end of the season.

== Season outlook ==
=== Pre-season polls ===
The Top 20 from the AP Poll and the UPI Coaches Poll during the pre-season.

Associated Press
| Ranking | Team |
|---|---|
| 1 | Cincinnati |
| 2 | Kentucky |
| 3 | Kansas State |
| 4 | West Virginia |
| 5 | NC State |
| 6 | Tennessee |
| 7 | Kansas |
| 8 | Mississippi State |
| 9 | Saint Louis |
| 10 | Northwestern |
| 11 | Notre Dame |
| 12 | Auburn |
| 13 | North Carolina |
| 14 | Saint Mary's |
| 15 | Michigan State |
| 16 | Xavier |
| 17 | Marquette |
| 18 | SMU |
| 19 | Indiana |
| 20 (tie) | Oklahoma State |
| 20 (tie) | St. John's |

UPI Coaches
| Ranking | Team |
|---|---|
| 1 | Cincinnati |
| 2 | Kansas State |
| 3 | Notre Dame |
| 4 | Kentucky |
| 5 | Michigan State |
| 6 | Washington |
| 7 | West Virginia |
| 8 | Xavier |
| 9 | Oklahoma State |
| 10 | St. John's |
| 11 | Maryland |
| 12 | NC State |
| 13 | Northwestern |
| 14 | North Carolina |
| 15 | Saint Joseph's |
| 16 | Saint Louis |
| 17 | Mississippi State |
| 18 | Purdue |
| 19 | Louisville |
| 20 | Iowa |

== Conference membership changes ==
| School | Former conference | New conference |
|---|---|---|
| Bucknell Bison | NCAA University Division independent | Middle Atlantic Conference |
| Canisius Golden Griffins | Western New York Little Three Conference | NCAA University Division independent |
| Delaware Fightin' Blue Hens | NCAA University Division independent | Middle Atlantic Conference |
| Fresno State Bulldogs | NCAA University Division independent | non-NCAA University Division |
| Gettysburg Bullets | non-NCAA University Division | Middle Atlantic Conference |
| Idaho State Bengals | non-NCAA University Division | NCAA University Division independent |
| Kentucky Wesleyan Panthers | NCAA University Division independent | non-NCAA University Division |
| La Salle Explorers | NCAA University Division independent | Middle Atlantic Conference |
| Lafayette Leopards | NCAA University Division independent | Middle Atlantic Conference |
| Lehigh Engineers | NCAA University Division independent | Middle Atlantic Conference |
| Muhlenberg Mules | NCAA University Division independent | Middle Atlantic Conference |
| Niagara Purple Eagles | Western New York Little Three Conference | NCAA University Division independent |
| Oklahoma State Cowboys | NCAA University Division independent | Big Eight Conference |
| Rutgers Scarlet Knights | NCAA University Division independent | Middle Atlantic Conference |
| St. Bonaventure Brown Indians | Western New York Little Three Conference | NCAA University Division independent |
| Saint Joseph's Hawks | NCAA University Division independent | Middle Atlantic Conference |
| Temple Owls | NCAA University Division independent | Middle Atlantic Conference |
| Valparaiso Crusaders | NCAA University Division independent | non-NCAA University Division |
| Washington and Lee Generals | Southern Conference | NCAA University Division independent |

== Regular season ==
=== Conferences ===
==== Conference winners and tournaments ====
| Conference | Regular season winner | Conference player of the year | Conference tournament | Tournament venue (City) | Tournament winner |
|---|---|---|---|---|---|
| Atlantic Coast Conference | North Carolina & NC State | Lou Pucillo, NC State | 1959 ACC men's basketball tournament | Reynolds Coliseum (Raleigh, North Carolina) | NC State |
| Big Eight Conference | Kansas State | Bob Boozer, Kansas State | No Tournament | | |
| Big Ten Conference | Michigan State | None selected | No Tournament | | |
| Border Conference | Arizona State, New Mexico State, & Texas Western | | No Tournament | | |
| Ivy League | Dartmouth | None selected | No Tournament | | |
| Metropolitan New York Conference | Manhattan | | No Tournament | | |
| Mid-American Conference | Bowling Green State | None selected | No Tournament | | |
| Middle Atlantic Conference | Saint Joseph's | | No Tournament | | |
| Missouri Valley Conference | Cincinnati | None selected | No Tournament | | |
| Mountain States (Skyline) Conference | Utah | | No Tournament | | |
| Ohio Valley Conference | Eastern Kentucky State | None selected | No Tournament | | |
| Pacific Coast Conference | California | | No Tournament | | |
| Southeastern Conference | Mississippi State | None selected | No Tournament | | |
| Southern Conference | West Virginia | Jerry West, West Virginia | 1959 Southern Conference men's basketball tournament | Richmond Arena (Richmond, Virginia) | West Virginia |
| Southwest Conference | TCU | H. E. Kirchner, TCU | No Tournament | | |
| West Coast Athletic Conference | Saint Mary's | LaRoy Doss, Saint Mary's, & Leroy Wright, Pacific | No Tournament | | |
| Yankee Conference | Connecticut | None selected | No Tournament | | |

==== Conference standings ====
1958–59 ACC men's basketball standings
| | Conf. | | | | Overall |
| Team | W | | L | PCT | W | | L | PCT |
|---|---|---|---|---|---|---|---|---|
| No. 6 NC State † | 12 | – | 2 | .857 | 22 | – | 4 | .846 |
| No. 9 North Carolina | 12 | – | 2 | .857 | 20 | – | 5 | .800 |
| Duke | 7 | – | 7 | .500 | 13 | – | 12 | .520 |
| Maryland | 7 | – | 7 | .500 | 10 | – | 13 | .435 |
| Virginia | 6 | – | 8 | .429 | 11 | – | 14 | .440 |
| Wake Forest | 5 | – | 9 | .357 | 10 | – | 14 | .417 |
| Clemson | 5 | – | 9 | .357 | 8 | – | 16 | .333 |
| South Carolina | 2 | – | 12 | .143 | 4 | – | 20 | .167 |
† 1959 ACC tournament winner Rankings from AP Poll

1958–59 Big Eight Conference men's basketball standings
| | Conf. | | | | Overall |
| Team | W | | L | PCT | W | | L | PCT |
|---|---|---|---|---|---|---|---|---|
| No. 1 Kansas State | 14 | – | 0 | 1.000 | 25 | – | 2 | .926 |
| Oklahoma | 9 | – | 5 | .643 | 15 | – | 10 | .600 |
| Colorado | 8 | – | 6 | .571 | 14 | – | 10 | .583 |
| Kansas | 8 | – | 6 | .571 | 11 | – | 14 | .440 |
| Nebraska | 5 | – | 9 | .357 | 12 | – | 13 | .480 |
| Oklahoma State | 5 | – | 9 | .357 | 11 | – | 14 | .440 |
| Iowa State | 4 | – | 10 | .286 | 9 | – | 16 | .360 |
| Missouri | 3 | – | 11 | .214 | 6 | – | 19 | .240 |
Rankings from AP Poll

1958–59 Big Ten Conference men's basketball standings
| | Conf. | | | | Overall |
| Team | W | | L | PCT | W | | L | PCT |
|---|---|---|---|---|---|---|---|---|
| No. 7 Michigan State | 12 | – | 2 | .857 | 19 | – | 4 | .826 |
| Northwestern | 8 | – | 6 | .571 | 15 | – | 7 | .682 |
| Michigan | 8 | – | 6 | .571 | 15 | – | 7 | .682 |
| Purdue | 8 | – | 6 | .571 | 15 | – | 7 | .682 |
| Illinois | 7 | – | 7 | .500 | 12 | – | 10 | .545 |
| Indiana | 7 | – | 7 | .500 | 11 | – | 11 | .500 |
| Ohio State | 7 | – | 7 | .500 | 11 | – | 11 | .500 |
| Iowa | 7 | – | 7 | .500 | 10 | – | 12 | .455 |
| Minnesota | 5 | – | 9 | .357 | 8 | – | 14 | .364 |
| Wisconsin | 1 | – | 13 | .071 | 3 | – | 19 | .136 |
Rankings from AP Poll

1958–59 Border Conference men's basketball standings
| | Conf. | | | | Overall |
| Team | W | | L | PCT | W | | L | PCT |
|---|---|---|---|---|---|---|---|---|
| New Mexico A&M | 7 | – | 3 | .700 | 17 | – | 11 | .607 |
| Arizona State–Tempe | 7 | – | 3 | .700 | 17 | – | 9 | .654 |
| Texas Western | 7 | – | 3 | .700 | 14 | – | 9 | .609 |
| West Texas State | 5 | – | 5 | .500 | 6 | – | 16 | .273 |
| Hardin–Simmons | 3 | – | 7 | .300 | 14 | – | 12 | .538 |
| Arizona | 1 | – | 9 | .100 | 4 | – | 22 | .154 |
Rankings from AP Poll

1958–59 Ivy League men's basketball standings
| | Conf. | | | | Overall |
| Team | W | | L | PCT | W | | L | PCT |
|---|---|---|---|---|---|---|---|---|
| Dartmouth† | 13 | – | 1 | .929 | 22 | – | 6 | .786 |
| Princeton | 13 | – | 1 | .929 | 19 | – | 5 | .792 |
| Yale | 9 | – | 5 | .643 | 10 | – | 13 | .435 |
| Brown | 6 | – | 8 | .429 | 11 | – | 13 | .458 |
| Pennsylvania | 5 | – | 9 | .357 | 12 | – | 14 | .462 |
| Harvard | 4 | – | 10 | .286 | 10 | – | 15 | .400 |
| Cornell | 4 | – | 10 | .286 | 8 | – | 15 | .348 |
| Columbia | 2 | – | 12 | .143 | 3 | – | 21 | .125 |
† Regular-season championship winner Rankings from AP Poll

1958–59 Metropolitan New York Conference men's basketball standings
| | Conf. | | | | Overall |
| Team | W | | L | PCT | W | | L | PCT |
|---|---|---|---|---|---|---|---|---|
| Manhattan | 4 | – | 0 | 1.000 | 15 | – | 6 | .714 |
| Brooklyn | 3 | – | 1 | .750 | 8 | – | 10 | .444 |
| St. John's | 4 | – | 2 | .667 | 20 | – | 6 | .769 |
| Fordham | 2 | – | 2 | .500 | 17 | – | 8 | .680 |
| NYU | 2 | – | 2 | .500 | 15 | – | 8 | .652 |
| CCNY | 1 | – | 6 | .143 | 6 | – | 12 | .333 |
| St. Francis (NY) | 0 | – | 3 | .000 | 5 | – | 18 | .217 |
Rankings from AP Poll

1958–59 Mid-American Conference men's basketball standings
| | Conf. | | | | Overall |
| Team | W | | L | PCT | W | | L | PCT |
|---|---|---|---|---|---|---|---|---|
| Bowling Green State | 9 | – | 3 | .750 | 18 | – | 8 | .692 |
| Miami (Ohio) | 9 | – | 3 | .750 | 14 | – | 11 | .560 |
| Ohio | 6 | – | 6 | .500 | 14 | – | 10 | .583 |
| Marshall | 6 | – | 6 | .500 | 12 | – | 12 | .500 |
| Kent State | 6 | – | 6 | .500 | 11 | – | 13 | .458 |
| Toledo | 5 | – | 7 | .417 | 11 | – | 13 | .458 |
| Western Michigan | 1 | – | 11 | .083 | 2 | – | 20 | .091 |
Rankings from AP Poll

1958–59 MAC men's basketball standings
| | Conf. | | | | Overall |
| Team | W | | L | PCT | W | | L | PCT |
|---|---|---|---|---|---|---|---|---|
| No. 14 Saint Joseph's | 7 | – | 0 | 1.000 | 22 | – | 5 | .815 |
| La Salle | 5 | – | 2 | .714 | 16 | – | 7 | .696 |
| Muhlenberg | 8 | – | 6 | .571 | 13 | – | 9 | .591 |
| Bucknell | 6 | – | 5 | .545 | 16 | – | 7 | .696 |
| Lafayette | 7 | – | 6 | .538 | 13 | – | 8 | .619 |
| Gettysburg | 4 | – | 5 | .444 | 13 | – | 13 | .500 |
| Delaware | 4 | – | 6 | .400 | 9 | – | 13 | .409 |
| Rutgers | 3 | – | 5 | .375 | 9 | – | 15 | .375 |
| Temple | 4 | – | 7 | .364 | 6 | – | 19 | .240 |
| Lehigh | 4 | – | 10 | .286 | 6 | – | 16 | .273 |
Rankings from AP Poll

1958–59 Missouri Valley Conference men's basketball standings
| | Conf. | | | | Overall |
| Team | W | | L | PCT | W | | L | PCT |
|---|---|---|---|---|---|---|---|---|
| No. 5 Cincinnati | 13 | – | 1 | .929 | 26 | – | 4 | .867 |
| No. 4 Bradley | 12 | – | 2 | .857 | 25 | – | 4 | .862 |
| No. 12 Saint Louis | 10 | – | 4 | .714 | 20 | – | 6 | .769 |
| Wichita Municipal | 7 | – | 7 | .500 | 14 | – | 12 | .538 |
| Houston | 6 | – | 8 | .429 | 12 | – | 14 | .462 |
| Drake | 4 | – | 10 | .286 | 9 | – | 15 | .375 |
| Tulsa | 2 | – | 12 | .143 | 10 | – | 15 | .400 |
| North Texas State | 2 | – | 12 | .143 | 6 | – | 18 | .250 |
Rankings from AP Poll

1958–59 Mountain States Conference men's basketball standings
| | Conf. | | | | Overall |
| Team | W | | L | PCT | W | | L | PCT |
|---|---|---|---|---|---|---|---|---|
| No. 18 Utah | 13 | – | 1 | .929 | 21 | – | 7 | .750 |
| Utah State | 10 | – | 4 | .714 | 19 | – | 7 | .731 |
| Denver | 10 | – | 4 | .714 | 14 | – | 10 | .583 |
| BYU | 8 | – | 6 | .571 | 15 | – | 11 | .577 |
| Montana | 7 | – | 7 | .500 | 10 | – | 14 | .417 |
| Colorado State | 6 | – | 8 | .429 | 8 | – | 14 | .364 |
| Wyoming | 1 | – | 13 | .071 | 4 | – | 22 | .154 |
| New Mexico | 1 | – | 13 | .071 | 3 | – | 19 | .136 |
Rankings from AP Poll

1958–59 Ohio Valley Conference men's basketball standings
| | Conf. | | | | Overall |
| Team | W | | L | PCT | W | | L | PCT |
|---|---|---|---|---|---|---|---|---|
| Eastern Kentucky State | 10 | – | 2 | .833 | 16 | – | 6 | .727 |
| Western Kentucky State | 8 | – | 4 | .667 | 16 | – | 10 | .615 |
| Tennessee Tech | 7 | – | 5 | .583 | 16 | – | 9 | .640 |
| East Tennessee State | 5 | – | 7 | .417 | 13 | – | 10 | .565 |
| Morehead State | 5 | – | 7 | .417 | 11 | – | 12 | .478 |
| Middle Tennessee | 4 | – | 8 | .333 | 9 | – | 17 | .346 |
| Murray State | 3 | – | 9 | .250 | 10 | – | 15 | .400 |
Rankings from AP Poll

1958–59 Pacific Coast Conference men's basketball standings
| | Conf. | | | | Overall |
| Team | W | | L | PCT | W | | L | PCT |
|---|---|---|---|---|---|---|---|---|
| No. 11 California | 14 | – | 2 | .875 | 25 | – | 4 | .862 |
| Washington | 11 | – | 5 | .688 | 18 | – | 8 | .692 |
| UCLA | 10 | – | 6 | .625 | 16 | – | 9 | .640 |
| Stanford | 10 | – | 6 | .625 | 16 | – | 9 | .640 |
| USC | 8 | – | 8 | .500 | 15 | – | 11 | .577 |
| Oregon State | 7 | – | 7 | .500 | 13 | – | 13 | .500 |
| Idaho | 6 | – | 10 | .375 | 11 | – | 15 | .423 |
| Oregon | 3 | – | 13 | .188 | 9 | – | 16 | .360 |
| Washington State | 3 | – | 13 | .188 | 10 | – | 16 | .385 |
Rankings from AP Poll

1958–59 Southeastern Conference men's basketball standings
| | Conf. | | | | Overall |
| Team | W | | L | PCT | W | | L | PCT |
|---|---|---|---|---|---|---|---|---|
| No. 3 Mississippi State | 13 | – | 1 | .929 | 24 | – | 1 | .960 |
| No. 8 Auburn | 12 | – | 2 | .857 | 20 | – | 2 | .909 |
| No. 2 Kentucky | 12 | – | 2 | .857 | 24 | – | 3 | .889 |
| Georgia Tech | 9 | – | 5 | .643 | 17 | – | 9 | .654 |
| Tennessee | 8 | – | 6 | .571 | 14 | – | 8 | .636 |
| Vanderbilt | 8 | – | 6 | .571 | 14 | – | 10 | .583 |
| Tulane | 6 | – | 8 | .429 | 13 | – | 11 | .542 |
| Alabama | 6 | – | 8 | .429 | 10 | – | 12 | .455 |
| Georgia | 5 | – | 9 | .357 | 11 | – | 15 | .423 |
| LSU | 2 | – | 12 | .143 | 10 | – | 15 | .400 |
| Florida | 2 | – | 12 | .143 | 8 | – | 15 | .348 |
| Ole Miss | 1 | – | 13 | .071 | 7 | – | 17 | .292 |
Rankings from AP Poll

1958–59 Southern Conference men's basketball standings
| | Conf. | | | | Overall |
| Team | W | | L | PCT | W | | L | PCT |
|---|---|---|---|---|---|---|---|---|
| No. 10 West Virginia † | 11 | – | 0 | 1.000 | 29 | – | 5 | .853 |
| Virginia Tech | 10 | – | 2 | .833 | 16 | – | 5 | .762 |
| The Citadel | 7 | – | 4 | .636 | 15 | – | 5 | .750 |
| William & Mary | 7 | – | 7 | .500 | 13 | – | 11 | .542 |
| Richmond | 6 | – | 8 | .429 | 11 | – | 11 | .500 |
| Furman | 5 | – | 7 | .417 | 14 | – | 12 | .538 |
| George Washington | 4 | – | 7 | .364 | 14 | – | 11 | .560 |
| Davidson | 2 | – | 8 | .200 | 9 | – | 15 | .375 |
| VMI | 2 | – | 11 | .154 | 5 | – | 13 | .278 |
† Southern Conference Tournament winner Rankings from AP Poll

1958–59 Southwest Conference men's basketball standings
| | Conf. | | | | Overall |
| Team | W | | L | PCT | W | | L | PCT |
|---|---|---|---|---|---|---|---|---|
| No. 16 TCU | 12 | – | 2 | .857 | 20 | – | 6 | .769 |
| SMU | 10 | – | 4 | .714 | 16 | – | 8 | .667 |
| Texas Tech | 8 | – | 6 | .571 | 15 | – | 9 | .625 |
| Baylor | 7 | – | 7 | .500 | 11 | – | 13 | .458 |
| Texas A&M | 6 | – | 8 | .429 | 15 | – | 9 | .625 |
| Arkansas | 6 | – | 8 | .429 | 9 | – | 14 | .391 |
| Rice | 5 | – | 9 | .357 | 11 | – | 13 | .458 |
| Texas | 2 | – | 12 | .143 | 4 | – | 20 | .167 |
Rankings from AP Poll

1958–59 West Coast Athletic Conference men's basketball standings
| | Conf. | | | | Overall |
| Team | W | | L | PCT | W | | L | PCT |
|---|---|---|---|---|---|---|---|---|
| No. 15 Saint Mary's | 11 | – | 1 | .917 | 19 | – | 6 | .760 |
| Santa Clara | 9 | – | 3 | .750 | 16 | – | 9 | .640 |
| Pepperdine | 8 | – | 4 | .667 | 16 | – | 8 | .667 |
| Pacific | 6 | – | 6 | .500 | 11 | – | 15 | .423 |
| Loyola (Calif.) | 4 | – | 8 | .333 | 8 | – | 15 | .348 |
| San Francisco | 3 | – | 9 | .250 | 6 | – | 20 | .231 |
| San Jose State | 1 | – | 11 | .083 | 5 | – | 19 | .208 |
Rankings from AP Poll

1958–59 Yankee Conference men's basketball standings
| | Conf. | | | | Overall |
| Team | W | | L | PCT | W | | L | PCT |
|---|---|---|---|---|---|---|---|---|
| Connecticut | 8 | – | 2 | .800 | 17 | – | 7 | .708 |
| Maine | 7 | – | 3 | .700 | 15 | – | 7 | .682 |
| Massachusetts | 5 | – | 5 | .500 | 11 | – | 13 | .458 |
| Rhode Island | 5 | – | 5 | .500 | 8 | – | 12 | .400 |
| Vermont | 4 | – | 6 | .400 | 12 | – | 10 | .545 |
| New Hampshire | 1 | – | 9 | .100 | 9 | – | 14 | .391 |

=== University Division independents ===
A total of 42 college teams played as University Division independents. Among them, St. Bonaventure (20–3) had the best winning percentage (.870) and Marquette (23–6) finished with the most wins.

1958–59 NCAA University Division men's basketball independents standings
| | Conf. | | | | Overall |
| Team | W | | L | PCT | W | | L | PCT |
|---|---|---|---|---|---|---|---|---|
| No. 19 St. Bonaventure | | – | | – | 20 | – | 3 | .870 |
| Saint Francis (Pa.) | | – | | – | 20 | – | 5 | .800 |
| No. 20 Marquette | | – | | – | 23 | – | 6 | .793 |
| No. 13 Seattle | | – | | – | 21 | – | 6 | .778 |
| Idaho State | | – | | – | 21 | – | 7 | .750 |
| Navy | | – | | – | 18 | – | 6 | .750 |
| Boston University | | – | | – | 20 | – | 7 | .741 |
| No. 17 Oklahoma City | | – | | – | 20 | – | 7 | .741 |
| Providence | | – | | – | 20 | – | 7 | .741 |
| Memphis State | | – | | – | 17 | – | 6 | .739 |
| Miami (Fla.) | | – | | – | 18 | – | 7 | .720 |
| Villanova | | – | | – | 18 | – | 7 | .720 |
| Portland | | – | | – | 19 | – | 8 | .704 |
| Niagara | | – | | – | 15 | – | 7 | .682 |
| Butler | | – | | – | 19 | – | 9 | .679 |
| Iona | | – | | – | 14 | – | 7 | .667 |
| Boston College | | – | | – | 17 | – | 9 | .654 |
| Louisville | | – | | – | 19 | – | 12 | .613 |
| Air Force | | – | | – | 14 | – | 9 | .609 |
| Syracuse | | – | | – | 14 | – | 9 | .609 |
| Army | | – | | – | 14 | – | 10 | .583 |
| Seton Hall | | – | | – | 13 | – | 10 | .565 |
| Holy Cross | | – | | – | 14 | – | 11 | .560 |
| Penn State | | – | | – | 11 | – | 9 | .550 |
| DePaul | | – | | – | 13 | – | 11 | .542 |
| Duquesne | | – | | – | 13 | – | 11 | .542 |
| Dayton | | – | | – | 14 | – | 12 | .538 |
| Montana State | | – | | – | 12 | – | 13 | .480 |
| Notre Dame | | – | | – | 12 | – | 13 | .480 |
| Xavier | | – | | – | 12 | – | 13 | .480 |
| Loyola (Ill.) | | – | | – | 11 | – | 13 | .458 |
| Detroit | | – | | – | 11 | – | 14 | .440 |
| Gonzaga | | – | | – | 11 | – | 15 | .423 |
| Pittsburgh | | – | | – | 10 | – | 14 | .417 |
| Washington University | | – | | – | 9 | – | 13 | .409 |
| Loyola (La.) | | – | | – | 10 | – | 16 | .385 |
| Colgate | | – | | – | 7 | – | 12 | .368 |
| Florida State | | – | | – | 8 | – | 15 | .348 |
| Georgetown | | – | | – | 8 | – | 15 | .348 |
| Canisius | | – | | – | 7 | – | 16 | .304 |
| Siena | | – | | – | 3 | – | 16 | .158 |
| Washington and Lee | | – | | – | 1 | – | 15 | .063 |
Rankings from AP Poll

=== Informal championships ===
| Conference | Regular season winner | Most Valuable Player |
|---|---|---|
| Philadelphia Big 5 | Saint Joseph's | Joe Spratt, Saint Joseph's |

Saint Joseph's finished with a 4–0 record in head-to-head competition among the Philadelphia Big 5.

== Post-season tournaments ==
=== NCAA tournament ===
==== Final Four ====
National semifinals
E | West Virginia | 94
ME | Louisville | 79
MW | Cincinnati | 58
W | California | 64

National finals
E | West Virginia | 70
W | California | 71
Third place
ME | Louisville | 85
MW | Cincinnati | 98

=== National Invitation tournament ===
==== Semifinals & finals ====
Semifinals
Bradley | 59
NYU | 57
Providence | 55
St. John's | 76

Finals
Bradley | 71
St. John′s | 76
Third place
NYU | 71
Providence | 57

== Awards ==
=== Consensus All-American teams ===
Consensus First Team
| Player | Position | Class | Team |
|---|---|---|---|
| Bob Boozer | F | Senior | Kansas State |
| Johnny Cox | G | Senior | Kentucky |
| Bailey Howell | F | Senior | Mississippi State |
| Oscar Robertson | G | Junior | Cincinnati |
| Jerry West | G | Junior | West Virginia |

Consensus Second Team
| Player | Position | Class | Team |
|---|---|---|---|
| Leo Byrd | G | Senior | Marshall |
| Johnny Green | F | Senior | Michigan State |
| Tom Hawkins | F | Senior | Notre Dame |
| Don Hennon | G | Senior | Pittsburgh |
| Al Seiden | G | Senior | St. John's |

=== Major player of the year awards ===
- Helms Player of the Year: Oscar Robertson, Cincinnati
- UPI Player of the Year: Oscar Robertson, Cincinnati
- Oscar Robertson Trophy (USBWA): Oscar Robertson, Cincinnati
- Sporting News Player of the Year: Oscar Robertson, Cincinnati

=== Major coach of the year awards ===
- Henry Iba Award: Eddie Hickey, Marquette
- NABC Coach of the Year: Eddie Hickey, Marquette
- UPI Coach of the Year: Adolph Rupp, Kentucky

=== Other major awards ===
- Robert V. Geasey Trophy (Top player in Philadelphia Big 5): Joe Spratt, Saint Joseph's
- NIT/Haggerty Award (Top player in New York City metro area): Al Seiden, St. John's

== Coaching changes ==
A number of teams changed coaches during the season and after it ended.

| Team | Former Coach | Interim Coach | New Coach | Reason |
|---|---|---|---|---|
| Boston University | Matt Zunic | | John H. Burke Jr. | Zunic left to coach Massachusetts. |
| Canisius | Joseph Curran | | Bob MacKinnon | |
| Cornell | Royner Greene | | Sam MacNeil | |
| Duke | Harold Bradley | | Vic Bubas | Bradley left to coach Texas. |
| Idaho | Harlan Hodges | | Dave Strack | |
| Idaho State | John Grayson | | John Evans | |
| Loyola (LA) | Hank Kuzma | | Bill Gardiner | |
| Massachusetts | Robert T. Curran | | Matt Zunic | |
| Minnesota | Osborne Cowles | | John Kundla | |
| North Texas | Pete Shands | | Charles Johnson | |
| Rutgers | Warren Harris | | Tony Kuolt | |
| San Francisco | Phil Woolpert | | Ross Giudice | Assistant Giudice takes over coaching duties. |
| South Carolina | Walt Hambrick | | Bob Stevens | |
| Tennessee | Emmett Lowery | | John Sines | |
| Tennessee State | John McLendon | | Harold Hunter | |
| Texas | Marshall Hughes | | Harold Bradley | |
| Texas Western | George McCarty | | Harold Davis | |
| Vanderbilt | Roy Skinner | | Bob Polk | Polk returns after taking the year off for health related issues. |
| West Texas State | Borden Price | | Metz LaFollette | |
