= 1959 NCAA Men's Basketball All-Americans =

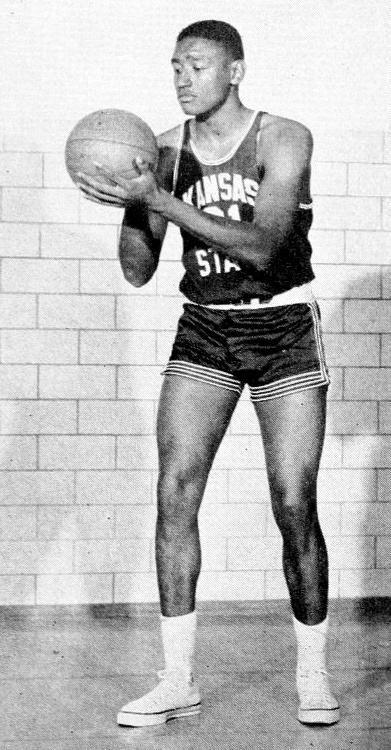
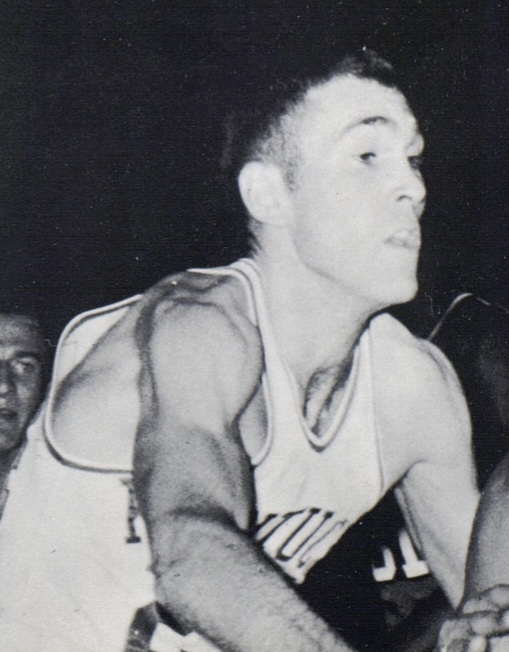
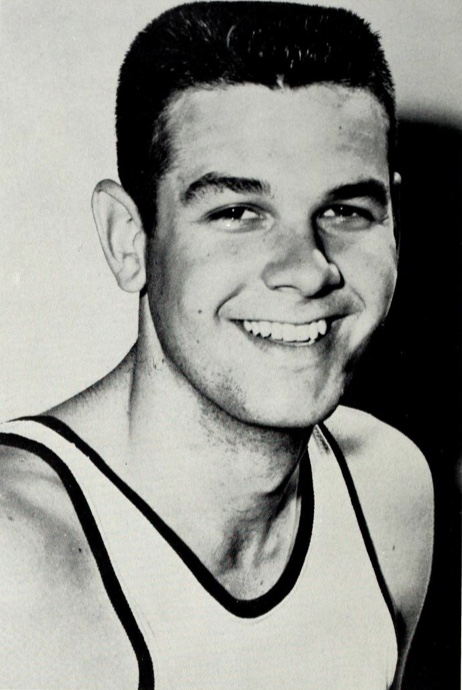
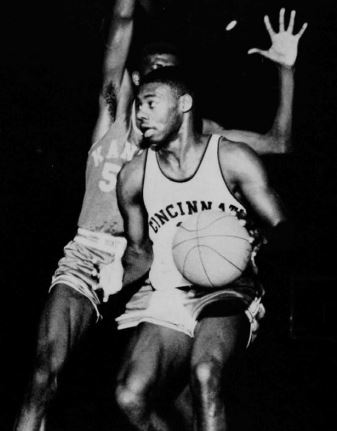
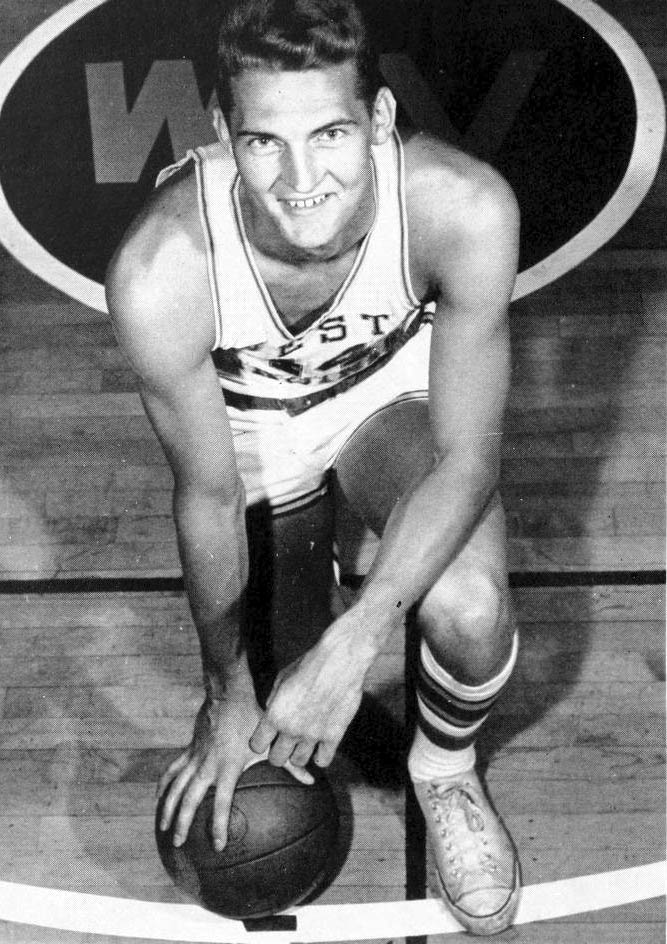
- The 1959 consensus first team. Clockwise from top left: Boozer, Cox, Howell, West, Robertson.
- Awarded for: 1958–59 NCAA University Division men's basketball season

The consensus 1959 College Basketball All-American team, as determined by aggregating the results of five major All-American teams. To earn "consensus" status, a player must win honors from a majority of the following teams: the Associated Press, the USBWA, The United Press International, the National Association of Basketball Coaches, and the Newspaper Enterprise Association (NEA).

== 1959 Consensus All-America team ==
Consensus First Team
Player	Position	Class	Team
Bob Boozer	F	Senior	Kansas State
Johnny Cox	G	Senior	Kentucky
Bailey Howell	F	Senior	Mississippi State
Oscar Robertson	G	Junior	Cincinnati
Jerry West	G	Junior	West Virginia

Consensus Second Team
Player	Position	Class	Team
Leo Byrd	G	Senior	Marshall
Johnny Green	F	Senior	Michigan State
Tom Hawkins	F	Senior	Notre Dame
Don Hennon	G	Senior	Pittsburgh
Al Seiden	G	Senior	St. John's

== Individual All-America teams ==
All-America Team
All-America Team	First team		Second team		Third team	
All-America Team	Player	School	Player	School	Player	School
Associated Press	Bob Boozer	Kansas State	Leo Byrd	Marshall	Bob Ferry	Saint Louis
Associated Press	Johnny Cox	Kentucky	Johnny Green	Michigan State	Jim Hagan	Tennessee Tech
Associated Press	Bailey Howell	Mississippi State	Tom Hawkins	Notre Dame	Ron Johnson	Minnesota
Associated Press	Oscar Robertson	Cincinnati	Don Hennon	Pittsburgh	York Larese	North Carolina
Associated Press	Jerry West	West Virginia	Lou Pucillo	North Carolina State	Joe Ruklick	Northwestern
USBWA/Look Magazine	Bob Boozer	Kansas State	No second or third teams (10-man first team)			
USBWA/Look Magazine	Johnny Cox	Kentucky	No second or third teams (10-man first team)			
USBWA/Look Magazine	Bob Ferry	Saint Louis	No second or third teams (10-man first team)			
USBWA/Look Magazine	Johnny Green	Michigan State	No second or third teams (10-man first team)			
USBWA/Look Magazine	Tom Hawkins	Notre Dame	No second or third teams (10-man first team)			
USBWA/Look Magazine	Bailey Howell	Mississippi State	No second or third teams (10-man first team)			
USBWA/Look Magazine	Lou Pucillo	North Carolina State	No second or third teams (10-man first team)			
USBWA/Look Magazine	Oscar Robertson	Cincinnati	No second or third teams (10-man first team)			
USBWA/Look Magazine	Al Seiden	St. John's	No second or third teams (10-man first team)			
USBWA/Look Magazine	Jerry West	West Virginia	No second or third teams (10-man first team)			
NABC	Bob Boozer	Kansas State	Johnny Green	Michigan State	Bob Ferry	Saint Louis
NABC	Johnny Cox	Kentucky	Tom Hawkins	Notre Dame	Tony Jackson	St. John's
NABC	Bailey Howell	Mississippi State	Don Hennon	Pittsburgh	Lou Pucillo	North Carolina State
NABC	Oscar Robertson	Cincinnati	John Richter	North Carolina State	Joe Ruklick	Northwestern
NABC	Jerry West	West Virginia	Al Seiden	St. John's	Lee Shaffer	North Carolina
UPI	Bob Boozer	Kansas State	Leo Byrd	Marshall	Charlie Brown	Seattle
UPI	Don Hennon	Pittsburgh	Johnny Cox	Kentucky	Bob Ferry	Saint Louis
UPI	Bailey Howell	Mississippi State	Johnny Green	Michigan State	Lou Pucillo	North Carolina State
UPI	Oscar Robertson	Cincinnati	Tom Hawkins	Notre Dame	Doug Smart	Washington
UPI	Jerry West	West Virginia	Al Seiden	St. John's	Walt Torrence	UCLA
NEA	Bob Boozer	Kansas State	Leo Byrd	Marshall	No third team	
NEA	Bailey Howell	Mississippi State	Johnny Cox	Kentucky	No third team	
NEA	Oscar Robertson	Cincinnati	Bob Ferry	Saint Louis	No third team	
NEA	Al Seiden	St. John's	Johnny Green	Michigan State	No third team	
NEA	Jerry West	West Virginia	John Richter	North Carolina State	No third team	

AP Honorable Mention:

- Bob Anderegg, Michigan State
- Bob Ayersman, Virginia Tech
- Carl Belz, Princeton
- Ed Blair, Western Michigan
- Bill Bridges, Kansas
- Charlie Brown, Seattle
- M. C. Burton, Michigan
- Arlen Clark, Oklahoma State
- Ralph Davis, Cincinnati
- LaRoy Doss, Saint Mary's
- Johnny Egan, Providence
- Rex Frederick, Auburn
- Dave Gunther, Iowa
- Lee Harman, Oregon State
- Jim Henry, Vanderbilt
- Dick Hickox, Miami (Florida)
- Leon Hill, Texas Tech
- Darrall Imhoff, California
- Tony Jackson, St. John's
- H. E. Kirchner, Texas Christian
- Roy Lange, William & Mary
- Rudy LaRusso, Dartmouth
- Walt Mangham, Marquette
- Bobby Joe Mason, Bradley
- Don Matuszak, Kansas State
- Charlie McNeil, Maryland
- Bucky McDonald, George Washington
- Willie Merriweather, Purdue
- Doug Moe, North Carolina
- Paul Neumann, Stanford
- Pearl Pollard, Utah
- John Richter, North Carolina State
- Gerry Schroeder, Colorado
- Al Seiden, St. John's
- Lee Shaffer, North Carolina
- Doug Smart, Washington
- Bob Smith, West Virginia
- Tom Stith, St. Bonaventure
- Gene Tormohlen, Tennessee
- Walt Torrence, UCLA
- Wilbur Trosch, Saint Francis (PA)
- Tony Windis, Wyoming
- Leroy Wright, Pacific

== See also ==
- 1958–59 NCAA University Division men's basketball season
