= 1958–59 Georgia Bulldogs basketball team =

American college basketball season

1958–59 Georgia Bulldogs basketball
- Conference: Southeastern Conference
- Record: 11–15 (5–9 SEC)
- Head coach: Harbin Lawson (8th season)
- Captain: Fred Edmonson
- Home arena: Woodruff Hall

1958–59 Southeastern Conference men's basketball standings
	Conf.				Overall
Team	W		L	PCT	W		L	PCT
No. 3 Mississippi State	13	–	1	.929	24	–	1	.960
No. 8 Auburn	12	–	2	.857	20	–	2	.909
No. 2 Kentucky	12	–	2	.857	24	–	3	.889
Georgia Tech	9	–	5	.643	17	–	9	.654
Tennessee	8	–	6	.571	14	–	8	.636
Vanderbilt	8	–	6	.571	14	–	10	.583
Tulane	6	–	8	.429	13	–	11	.542
Alabama	6	–	8	.429	10	–	12	.455
Georgia	5	–	9	.357	11	–	15	.423
LSU	2	–	12	.143	10	–	15	.400
Florida	2	–	12	.143	8	–	15	.348
Ole Miss	1	–	13	.071	7	–	17	.292
Rankings from AP Poll

The 1958–59 Georgia Bulldogs basketball team represented the University of Georgia as a member of the Southeastern Conference (SEC) during the 1958–59 NCAA University Division men's basketball season. Led by eighth-year head coach Harbin Lawson, the Bulldogs compiled an overall record of 11–15 with a mark of 5–9 conference play, placing in ninth in the SEC. The team captain was Fred Edmonson.

== Roster ==
1958–59 Georgia Bulldogs men's basketball team
Players
Coaches

Pos.	#	Name	Height	Weight	Year	Previous school	Hometown
G		Gordon Darrah	6 ft 2 in (1.88 m)	—
G		Fred Edmondson	6 ft 0 in (1.83 m)	—	Sr
F		Sonny Poss	6 ft 4 in (1.93 m)	—	Sr
G		Don Keiser	6 ft 4 in (1.93 m)	—	So
C		John Johnson	6 ft 7 in (2.01 m)	—	So
F		Pat Casey	6 ft 4 in (1.93 m)	—	So
F		Joe De Foor	6 ft 2 in (1.88 m)	—	Sr
G		Ken Taylor	6 ft 3 in (1.91 m)	—	So
G		Bobby Chaney	6 ft 0 in (1.83 m)	—	Sr
F		Clark Royer	6 ft 3 in (1.91 m)	—
G		Don Moore	5 ft 9 in (1.75 m)	—
G		Bob Holder	6 ft 0 in (1.83 m)	—
C		DeLacey Luke	—	—

Head coach

Harbin Lawson

Assistant coach(es)

Legend

- (C) Team captain
- (S) Suspended
- (I) Ineligible
- (W) Walk-on
- Injured
- Current redshirt

== Schedule ==
Date time, TV	Opponent	Result	Record	Site city, state
12/1/1958	Clemson	W 76-59	1–0	Athens, GA
12/3/1958	at Florida	W 66-63	2–0	
12/11/1958	at Georgia Tech	L 66-73	2–1	
12/13/1958	at South Carolina	W 76-72	3–1	
12/19/1958	The Citadel	L 52-78	3–2	Athens, GA
12/20/1958	Florida State	W 83-72	4–2	Athens, GA
12/29/1958	LSU	L 60-63	4–3	Athens, GA
12/30/1958	Florida	L 55-58	4–4	Athens, GA
1/3/1959	LSU	L 66-79	4–5	Athens, GA
1/5/1959	Tulane	W 70-63	5–5	Athens, GA
1/7/1959	Georgia Tech	L 62-66	5–6	Athens, GA
1/10/1959	Alabama	W 80-79	6–6	Athens, GA
1/14/1959	at Mercer	L 62-66	6–7	
1/19/1959	Florida State	W 94-91	7–7	Athens, GA
1/24/1959	Auburn	L 61-81	7–8	Athens, GA
1/29/1959	at Kentucky	L 55-108	7–9	
1/31/1959	at Tennessee	L 60-66	7–10	
2/3/1959	Mercer	W 71-59	8–10	Athens, GA
2/7/1959	at Auburn	L 69-95	8–11	
2/9/1959	at Alabama	L 65-71	8–12	
2/14/1959	Ole Miss	W 84-61	9–12	Athens, GA
2/16/1959	Mississippi State	L 56-76	9–13	Athens, GA
2/18/1959	South Carolina	W 65-57	10–13	Athens, GA
2/21/1959	at Georgia Tech	L 62-82	10–14	
2/23/1959	at Vanderbilt	L 50-78	10–15	
2/28/1959	Florida	W 85-67	11–15	Athens, GA
*Non-conference game. (#) Tournament seedings in parentheses.
