= 1961 NCAA University Division men's basketball gambling scandal =

During the 1960–61 NCAA University Division men's basketball season, a major gambling scandal involving a former NBA All-Star basketball player and many members of organized crime syndicates broke through which had ultimately been years in the making. The scandal involved 37 arrests of students from 22 different colleges, as well as at least nine players that received money from fixers or gamblers that were never convicted of crimes, eight go-betweens being prosecuted for their efforts in the scandal (including a couple of former college basketball players and a college football player from the University of Connecticut named William "Bill" Minnerly), and two players being shown to have received bribe offers without reporting them to proper authorities. Not only that, but close to fifty people who had associated ties with the scandal were reported to have been permanently banned from the NBA as well as a result of this case, including future Hall of Fame players Connie Hawkins and Roger Brown, thus making this case more infamous in terms of results and impact than the 1951 college basketball point-shaving scandal from a decade prior. However, it is slated that hundreds more players alongside 43 other college basketball games were controlled throughout the scandal by comparison.

== Background ==
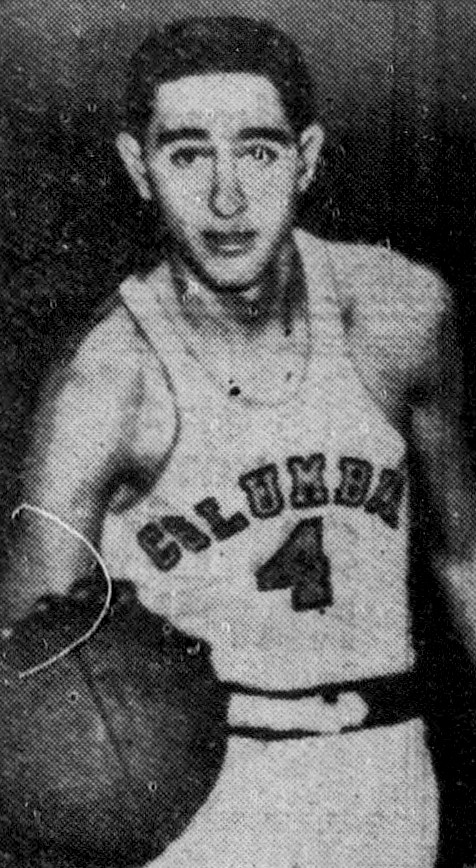
Former Columbia University and NBA All-Star forward Jack Molinas would be the key figurehead alongside Joe Hacken for this gambling scandal in the NCAA after previously being retroactively involved with the 1951 college basketball point-shaving scandal back in the early 1950s.

Jack Molinas, an already well-known gambling associate that was related to the 1951 college basketball point-shaving scandal to the point of being permanently banned by the NBA for gambling issues in 1954, was implicated as the primary key figure of this gambling scandal. One of his partners of crime in this operation at hand, bookmaker (and one-time independent basketball team owner) Joe Hacken (born in Austria-Hungary as Solomon Hacken), was a long-time friend of Molinas' well before 1952 during his time at Columbia University back when Jack played basketball there, with Molinas' first bet that he had with Hacken (who had the neighborhood nickname of Joe Jalop during that time due to him always driving an old battered car) occurring back when Jack was 12 years old during the World War II period (with Hacken essentially teaching Molinas a lot of the gambling terms necessary during this period of time at that age). In fact, the gambling scandal would technically begin with Hacken even before Molinas would be involved in the operation himself by as early as the 1954–55 NCAA season, with two St. John's University sophomore players named Michael Parenti and William Chrystal having been eventually discovered to have manipulated scores throughout their entire playing careers up until they graduated from the university in 1957. Despite their shenanigans being reported to head coach Joe Lapchick by a teammate of theirs named Gus Alfieri, no action was ever taken on them while they attended college. However, the scheme would only grow into a bigger problem once Molinas, who was playing for the Williamsport Billies in the Eastern Professional Basketball League for a few years following his banning from the NBA, got in touch with St. Louis bookie and gambler Dave Goldberg in 1957 with the suggestion that he should try and fix college basketball games to satisfy his gambling itch.

In addition to Hacken and Goldberg, Molinas' partners in the work included Genovese crime family acting boss Thomas Eboli and enforcer Vincent Gigante, pool shark and Yankee Stadium concessions manager (specifically a manager for the Stevens Concessions Company, a peanut vendor there) Aaron Wagman, former William Howard Taft High School basketball standout player turned dropout pool shark Joe Green (who was also a friend of Molinas' at the time), and former Brooklyn College basketball captain and junior high school teacher David "Dave" Budin not long afterward. Including Goldberg and Genovese crime family members, other organized crime members and high-stakes gamblers that got involved included his associate Steve "Likos" Lekemetros, Boston's Philip La Court, Vincent Gigante's brother Ralph Gigante, and Chicago Outfit informant Frank "Lefty" Rosenthal (the last of whom would inspire a character named Sam "Ace" Rothstein from the 1995 hit film Casino) with later co-conspirators including Pittsburgh's Frankie Cardone and Morris Heyison, Chicago's Anthony Di Chiantini, and New Yorkers Charles Tucker and Paul Walker. Further later convictions that were tried in North Carolina also included Bob Kraw, Jake Israel, Peter Martino, and two go-betweens in Louis Barshak and Michael Siegel. One other case that was also related to the scandal involved a University of Pittsburgh dental teacher named Edward H. Sebastian, who attempted to bribe two Pittsburgh basketball players multiple times in 1959 to earn half of any winnings he got, assist them with entry into the dental school that he taught in, and to even purchase an automobile of any kind they wanted at a reduced price for the apparent purpose of having them seek dental treatment.

== Scandal's beginnings ==
Implementation of this scheme was planned to have begun as early as the 1957–58 NCAA season back when Molinas was first told to do this kind of betting, but logistical issues on what types of players would be likely to accept offers from fixers and how would these players be recruited into the operation at hand delayed the immediate impact Molinas and his group had. Once the logistics of who could be involved and criteria used were figured out by the group, fixers that had basketball talent like Molinas and Green (and later Budin) would go out and get in touch with the players they targeted for their scheme by softening them up while meeting them in either neighborhood games, summer games, or college basketball towns like Tuscaloosa with either money for them, a lunch or dinner that was on the gamblers, or even arranging a party with booze and women for them. When the player(s) in question were given a sign that had an interest in fixing at least one game (oftentimes more), they were offered a bribe and the ones that agreed to it would be paid to recruit other players into the scheme, as well as communicate with others that agreed to rig certain games and potentially relay information to other gamblers and vice versa. Some regular college students would also be involved with trying to get other student-athletes involved in the scheme for Molinas' group, including using coded language (sometimes through phone calls) to relay information to involved people.

Despite the notion of how widespread the scandal would eventually become, it would also involve many mishaps, suspicions from within the group, and betrayals like players double-crossing the group at times or even the group double-crossing some of the players instead. One mishap that almost ended the scheme early involved a failed attempt from Joe Green to recruit Brown University player Jerry Alaimo before the 1957–58 season began; not only did Green fail to recruit Alaimo, but Alaimo would anonymously call the office of Manhattan's District Attorney Frank Hogan (the same man that stopped the 1951 college basketball point-shaving scandal years prior) to report the bribe attempt in order to maintain his own collegiate eligibility, though no known action was taken from this case during that time.

Other times, when bets on what would have been fixed games went awry, some players would agree to take on the bet at first, only to then change their minds during the game and play competitively like they normally would have. Sometimes, players that did end up fixing games the gamblers wanted them to fix so they could take on the money they would have earned later on either attempted to give the money back to the group or contended that it was just payment for advice. In more extreme cases, the fixers would sometimes double-cross players by claiming a spread was by one margin when it was actually by another margin instead, with worse scenarios involving potential violence upon players if they acted out of line for failing to fix a game on their end. There were also instances where backers of the group threatened even the leader of the operation with his own life, let alone refuse to pay out his group, if they suspected Molinas' group double-crossed them, as well as instances where Molinas' own group would double-cross each other to the point of creating a convoluted web of lies and manipulation sometimes.

== Notable times players and teams got affected by the scandal ==
Outside of players that were involved with the scandal directly, other players and teams were also affected by the scandal in sometimes indirect ways as well.

=== Al Seiden ===
One of the earliest tragic cases involved a star point guard from St. John's University named Al Seiden. In one instance back in 1958, when Seiden was playing collegiately, Budin mistakenly told Molinas that Seiden would fix a game for him, which led to Molinas selling the game to Rosenthal as a bet, which ended up losing him a lot of money in the process. In order to save Budin's life that day, Molinas blamed Seiden for the incident. Despite the group not touching Seiden's name again afterward and Seiden later being drafted by the St. Louis Hawks in the second round of the 1959 NBA draft (back when the NBA would hold at least 14 rounds for their drafts, if not more than that, at one point), the Hawks would mysteriously bench Seiden for his entire rookie season, which forcibly led to him quitting the NBA altogether and the NBA effectively blacklisting him indirectly as an incident of the case. He would later play for a few years in the Eastern Professional Basketball League as well as the Pittsburgh Rens of the short-lived American Basketball League revival attempt, but his basketball career would never be the same following the rookie season benching on the Hawks. Another teammate of his in Tony Jackson would also get banned from the NBA later on due in part of failing to report a bribe offer he had been given himself.

=== Jim Robinson and Alphra Saunders' potential involvement ===
During the month of March 1959, former managing editor of the Peoria Journal and at the time current radio newscaster George W. Barrett reported that around $20,000 to $30,000 (worth around $216,355 to $324,530 in 2024) was being bet on college basketball in the city of Peoria, Illinois on a nightly basis. The problem with those numbers in question was that betting lines were set on a national basis and that similar betting lines occurred in not just Springfield, Illinois, but in other cities within the state as well. As such, Barrett alleged that Molinas' friend, Joe Hacken, gave some softening money to two Bradley University players in Jim Robinson and Alphra Saunders, which would have made Bradley a repeat offender following their previous case in the 1951 college basketball point-shaving scandal going into this scandal. However, when Hacken was arrested two years later in the month of March 1961, he ultimately did not confess to rigging any of Bradley University's games, and since the claims could not be 100% proven, Barrett's claims on the two players could be seen as potential hearsay. Regardless of the validity of Barrett's claims, though, both Robinson and Saunders were likely given permanent bannings from the NBA following the scandal coming to light.

=== Dave Leveton and Greg Kaufman ===
A lesser-known instance of a younger player having contact with Jack Molinas during the time he was involved in his scandal happened to also involve a then-thirteen year old teenager named Dave Leveton, who also met one of his players that got associated with Molinas in Gary Kaufman, a star player from the College of the Pacific (now University of the Pacific) in Stockton, California that was working as a basketball camp counselor in the Catskills during the summer of 1959. To the young Leveton, he felt like a very cool camp counselor due to him being handsome, suave, having a lot of money with plenty of women to go with him, and a new red Corvette that he was driving at the time; that would leave a long-lasting impression on the teenager. One day during the camp, Kaufman informed Leveton and the other campers that a former NBA player that was "down on his luck" would be visiting the camp and that the students should be nice to him; the player turned out to be Molinas, as he helped Kaufman out with basketball instructions and drills during his day at the camp. However, it was not until after Leveton found out that Kaufman was one of the people going on trial against Molinas in order to protect himself years later where the older and wiser Leveton learned the truth about Kaufman and Molinas' coolness at hand, to the point where his generational "end of innocence" happened in 1962 during the Molinas trial. Following the scandal, it was likely that Leveton would receive a permanent ban from the NBA and not play any college basketball as well due to his prior association with Kaufman and Molinas.

=== Dick Falenski and John Fridley ===
For one case that did not have any direct ties to Jack Molinas and his group, yet was still involved with the case years later, there's the December 21, 1959 arrest of Edward H. Sebastian, a University of Pittsburgh dental teacher from McKees Rocks, Pennsylvania, who attempted to bribe two of the university's basketball players in Dick Falenski and John Fridley. Sebastian offered both Falenski and Fridley half of any winnings that he would receive from any bets he had, assist them with entry into the same dental school that Sebastian taught in, and the purchase of an automobile of any kind at a reduced price. Both Falenski and Fridley met with Sebastian multiple times before Sebastian was arrested, with Falenski seeing him three times and Fridley meeting him twice. The arrested dental teacher explained to authorities that his meetings held the purpose of encouraging college athletes to seek out dental treatment for their future. Sebastian was later given a prison sentence that lasted some time between eight months and three years long in relation to what he did. As for Falenski and Fridley, both players were later given permanent bannings from the NBA due to them failing to initially report the incident to proper authorities the first time they were each given the chance to do so.

=== West Virginia University vs. New York University (1960) ===
In March 1960, during the 1960 NCAA University Division basketball tournament, the East Region's semifinals match between West Virginia University (led by the great Jerry West, who was in his senior year of college by this time) and New York University (who appeared to have recovered from having one of their players being involved with the 1951 college basketball point-shaving scandal from years ago by this time via entering their second ever NCAA tournament) had at least one player who, unbeknownst to everyone on both teams at the time outside of likely the one player on NYU himself, accepted a bribe worth $1,000 (worth $10,635 in 2024) to throw the semifinals match to West Virginia a week before the match would be played. However, during the heat of the moment of the game, the player in question forgot entirely about the fix and tried to play the game to win instead. That would ultimately culminate into the final seconds of overtime where Jerry West would try to hit a jump shot for the win while being closely guarded by Satch Sanders, but missed due to getting his view obstructed by sophomore Ray Paprocky, the player that originally was going to throw the game in favor to West Virginia earlier on. In that cruel sense of ironic fate, West's final college basketball game played would end with a missed jump shot over a player that originally tried to throw a game away to him and his team on purpose earlier on in an 82–81 overtime loss for West Virginia. New York would later beat Duke University 74–59 to get a surprise reach into the Final Four that year, where they would ultimately lose to the eventual national champions in Ohio State University, as well as lose their third place game to the University of Cincinnati, thus inadvertently sparing them the punishment of vacating their Final Four run later on following the eventual reveal that Paprocky was one of the players involved in the gambling scandal.

=== Connie Hawkins and Roger Brown ===
Perhaps the most infamous cases relating to the scandal involve those of then-high school seniors turned freshmen basketball stars in the making in Connie Hawkins and Roger Brown. Both Hawkins and Brown had the unfortunate luck of meeting Jack Molinas and his partner-in-crime Joe Hacken while they were just nearly exiting out of high school and looking to enter their respective colleges of interest in the University of Iowa and the University of Dayton. Like with what the group had done with other prospects before them, Molinas furnished the two with money, women, and the usage of Molinas' own convertible vehicle during the summer of 1960. Unlike with other players, however, Brown would admit that he had received some money from Molinas during his freshman year at Dayton, which caused him to get expelled from the university altogether despite not playing a single game for them (and thus not being a part of the official gambling scandal) due to NCAA restrictions for freshmen at the time. Similarly speaking, Hawkins was also expelled from the University of Iowa during his freshman year due to him admitting that he borrowed $200 ($2,170 in current dollar terms) from Molinas for college expenses that he repaid to his brother Fred before the scandal broke through in 1961. For both Hawkins and Brown, they were kept out of seeking legal counsel while being questioned by New York City detectives that were investigating the scandal. It was later recorded in an affidavit by Molinas that while he had intended to later use the two players in his gambling scandal, he ultimately never got to the two of them (primarily Hawkins) because of their freshman status at the time.

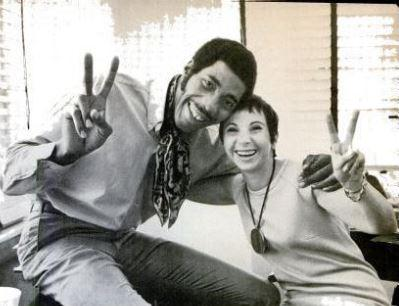
Connie Hawkins in 1969, with attorney Roslyn Litman, celebrating the settlement of Hawkins' antitrust case against the NBA. Hawkins later joined the NBA that same year with the Phoenix Suns.

The long-term consequences would greatly affect both of their careers significantly following the scandal. Both Hawkins and Brown went undrafted in both 1964 and 1965 before being declared permanently banned by the NBA in 1966 due to their remote involvement with Jack Molinas' point-shaving scandal. For Hawkins, he would try to make the best out of his bad situation by playing for the Pittsburgh Rens in the short-lived rivaling revival of the American Basketball League, the Harlem Globetrotters, and the Pittsburgh/Minnesota Pipers of the rivaling American Basketball Association (earning honors in both leagues and the first ever ABA championship while with the Pittsburgh Pipers) before an antitrust lawsuit notably filed by David Litman (brother of the owners of the Pittsburgh Rens) and his wife Roslyn Litman for Hawkins worth $6 million (worth $58.3 million in current dollar terms) that was first created in 1966 combined with a Life Magazine article written by David Wolf clearing Hawkins' name led to him being the first player to be unbanned from the NBA in 1969. Once unbanned, he would sign an up with the NBA for the rest of his career, first playing for the Phoenix Suns until 1973 after winning a coin toss over the Seattle SuperSonics for him, then playing for the Los Angeles Lakers for two seasons before finishing his career with the Atlanta Hawks in 1976. He notably was named a four-time All-Star and All-NBA Team member in 1970, which led to him getting his number retired by the Suns in 1976 (later being a part of the Phoenix Suns Ring of Honor), being inducted into the Naismith Basketball Hall of Fame in 1992, and eventually working with the Suns organization up until his death in 2017.

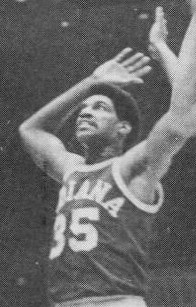
Roger Brown would see great success, primarily with the Indiana Pacers in the ABA, years after his ban from the NBA.

Brown, meanwhile, would play in local amateur leagues until 1967, where with the recommendation of Hawkins, Brown would enter the upstart rivaling ABA as well as become the first ever signed player of the Indiana Pacers. Brown would spend most of his professional career with the Pacers, with his final playing season being mixed alongside the Memphis Sounds and Utah Stars before returning to the Pacers to finish his career in 1975 near the end of the ABA's life cycle. During his time with them, Brown was named an All-Star four times, received multiple honors within the ABA, and helped the Pacers win three ABA Finals championships, including a Finals MVP award for their first championship in 1970. He also was able to be an assistant coach for the Pacers for the 1979–80 season when they moved to the NBA, as well as get his number retired by the team despite never playing in the NBA before dying from colon cancer in 1996. Both Brown and Hawkins were also voted into the ABA All-Time Team in 1997 (with Brown being inducted posthumously with unanimous votes). Brown would also receive a posthumous induction into the Naismith Basketball Hall of Fame in 2013 through the help of the ABA committee.

=== Charlie North and John Morgan ===
One case that had players get caught and subsequently expelled from their university in question almost immediately involved two players from what was called the University of Detroit at the time. During the early period of December 1960, one Detroit player named Charlie North reported to head coach Bob Calihan that a casual friend of his named Mike Siegel wrote a letter to him inviting him to join a resort basketball team to make some fast money on the side. Calihan then gave the letter to the university's athletic director at the time, John Mulroy, who thought the letter was "ambiguous" in its nature, but said it ultimately justified no further action than what already was deemed necessary. North later received another letter from Siegel and gave it to Calihan, this time warning North that outside activities suggested by his friend were impermissible to collegiate rules, before giving that letter to Mulroy again (though no further action was taken to try and stop things from escalating any further there). North had also claimed he had several conversations with Siegel that he tried to report to the university, though the university denied knowledge of such conversations occurring. Regardless, North and his teammate John Morgan later met Siegel and Yonkers attorney Charles Tucker at a local restaurant in order to fix four different games involving Detroit during the current season they were on. The duo initially balked at the idea, but ultimately went into fixing a game Detroit played against Ohio State University. After returning to the restaurant where they first met the fixers to each collect the $1,000 they were both given for rigging that game in question, the fixers quickly left the restaurant thinking they were in a set-up after seeing some off-duty cops eating dinner themselves. Not long after the meeting, North and Morgan were both not only immediately dismissed from the university due to their participating in the scandal for quick money, but they were also given permanent bannings from the NBA once the case came to greater light following Jack Molinas' arrest.

=== North Carolina–NC State January 1961 rivalry match ===
On January 18, 1961, the North Carolina-NC State basketball game resulted in North Carolina State College (now North Carolina State University) losing badly 97–66 to then No. 6 ranked University of North Carolina. After the game, Everett Case, NC State's head coach, felt certain that at least three of his players rigged this specific game since the teams' contests the prior season were competitive enough to make the games close despite both of those matches being NC State losses. Case reported his suspicions to North Carolina's State Bureau of Investigation, asking to investigate the results of that game in particular to see if he was correct in his assertions, especially after the following rivalry game in February provided results similar to other previous games despite it being yet another loss to the now No. 7 ranked University of North Carolina. It would later be confirmed that Case was correct. Multiple players from North Carolina State were involved in rigging the game. The initial three players he suspected in Terry Litchfield, Anton Muehlbauer, and Stanley Niewierowski, and a fourth player, Donald Gallagher, were involved. Additionally, two players from the rival university, North Carolina's Louis Brown and Doug Moe, were involved. Case was the only college basketball head coach to report to proper authorities about suspicious activities with players within the NCAA's basketball games at the time this incident occurred.

=== Paul Tagliabue ===
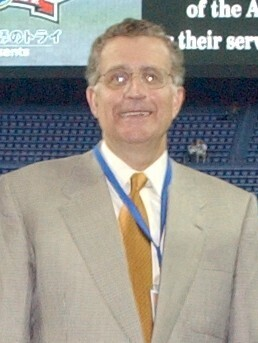
Paul Tagliabue, a later NFL commissioner from 1989 to 2006, later discovered he had inadvertently played in a fixed game while at Georgetown. He would take significant stances against gambling in sports following that incident.

One player that later revealed himself to have played in an NCAA game against a team that had at least one confirmed player involved in the gambling scandal would be a future NFL commissioner named Paul Tagliabue. On September 12, 1991, during a Congressional meeting supporting the federal legalization of the Professional and Amateur Sports Protection Act of 1992 in order to prevent the spread of state-sponsored sports betting beyond the borders of Nevada and a few other states where betting on sports games was considered legal at that point in time, Tagliabue revealed that he had inadvertently played in a game that involved fixers letting the opposing team shave points off in a game where his university he played for at the time, Georgetown University, ultimately won in a match played at the Madison Square Garden. Investigative reporting by Ryan Rodenberg from Vice Sports later revealed the game in question to be a March 2, 1961 match against New York University (which coincidentally was Georgetown's final game of the season during Tagliabue's junior year there), where Georgetown looked to blowout New York 92–69 thinking the team had a shot at heading to the National Invitation Tournament that year before finding out a year and a half later that at least one player named Ray Paprocky and potentially up to three of New York University's players, including Paprocky, had ultimately fixed the game for some gamblers in the scandal that came to light later that season. Tagliabue had also mentioned to the U.S. Senate only three months prior to his September 12 meeting that he saw first-hand how some of his fellow peers during his high school days at a summer camp he attended would get used by gamblers for later games in the future by starting small with $50 bills for them before leading up to their parts in the scandal coming to light later on in 1961. Due to his previous experiences combined with him growing up to be against gambling by his family, Tagliabue took a hard-lined stance against gambling being involved in the NFL with his players when he became the future commissioner of that league from 1989 until 2006.

=== St. Joseph's College vs. University of Utah (1961) ===
The last major case where players and teams were affected by the scandal during the time it was actually going on involved the 1961 NCAA University Division basketball tournament with three of St. Joseph's College (now Saint Joseph's University)'s players throughout that season in Jack Egan, Vincent Kempton, and Frank Majewski being key players that would take part in the scandal throughout the season. Majewski would be the main player from St. Joseph's College to not just accept the initial offer given to him from the fixers at hand, but also recruit his teammates in Egan and Kempton to join him as well due to each of them being in tough situations in life. While in college, Majewski would lose his father as a sophomore and see his mom suffer a heart attack not long afterward as a junior, Egan would already be a father to two young sons while losing a third kid to miscarriage before his senior season began, and Kempton would need money himself for reasons that were considered undisclosed, though it is presumed to be related to gambling debts. Despite taking part in the scandal throughout the season (with at least three games being confirmed to have been fixed since Egan had stipulations on what games he did not want the gamblers to fix during that period of time), St. Joseph's College would still finish the regular season with a 22–4 record (with Egan also being named an AP All-American Honorable Mention at the time despite being a player to participate in said scandal), earning the right to participate in the NCAA tournament that year with a bye round to automatically enter the semifinals of the East region due to them having the best record of the teams participating in that region that year.

While their three players were still dealing with the consequences of participating in the scandal before it came to light in the public eye, St. Joseph's College would defeat Princeton University 72–67 and then Wake Forest College (now Wake Forest University) 92–82 in order to earn the right to enter the Final Four, where they would get mollywhopped by the then-undefeated defending champion Ohio State University 95–69. During their Final Four run and before playing their third place game against the University of Utah (who had the team name of the Redskins at the time instead of the modern Utes), both St. Joseph's faculty athletic director Reverend Joseph M. Geib and head coach Jack Ramsay expressed their concerns for Majewski in particular due to his irregular play throughout the season, as well as Ramsay saying to reporters that he'd sooner quit coaching altogether if he found out one of his players got involved with point-shaving themselves.

While the St. Joseph's Hawks tried to bounce back from the awful loss to Ohio State, Majewski and the other two seniors in question had felt guilty for taking on the extra money for fixing games for the purpose of helping gamblers and fixers out earlier on in the season. As such, the three players sought to play their hearts out in that final game they played in, with both Egan and Majewski getting double-doubles and Majewski even trying to hit a game-winning shot in regulation time as his own way to apologize to his coach for earlier before the Hawks eventually beat the Redskins with a 127–120 score that went into quadruple-overtime. That game would not only tie the record for the longest-recorded game in NCAA tournament history alongside a 1956 first-round match between Canisius College (now Canisius University) and North Carolina State College (now North Carolina State University), but it also set a new record for the highest-scoring college basketball game in NCAA tournament history at the time before since being broken in 1990 by Loyola Marymount University routing the University of Michigan in the second round.

During a celebratory team banquet, St. Joseph's College was awarded an MVP trophy that had initially been meant for Egan, but was instead awarded to James Lynam due to his teammate not attending the banquet (which was later revealed to be in relation to the point-shaving scandal being uncovered not long afterward). Ohio State was also considered affected by how long the game turned out to be since they had repeatedly gone in and out of warmups multiple times for an hour straight, which likely affected their chances at ending their season as undefeated repeat champions since they lost the championship game to the University of Cincinnati by a 70–65 score in overtime. Days after the NCAA tournament ended, news broke out on multiple St. Joseph's players being implicated in the point-shaving scandal that was starting to get exposed to the public eye, which not only led to Egan, Kempton, and Majewski being expelled from campus before officially graduating (though they would all eventually later graduate from the university with proper degrees to their names and become successful businessmen afterward) but also led to them being permanently banned from the NBA with Egan losing out on playing with the Philadelphia Warriors (now the Golden State Warriors) after being the 29th pick of the 1961 NBA draft and Kempton losing out on potentially playing for the New York Knicks as the last pick of that year's draft. Not only that, but St. Joseph's College would have their third-place finish in the tournament be vacated from the record books soon afterward. As for head coach Jack Ramsay, contrary to his initial statements, he would continue coaching for the university until 1966 due to an edema on his right eye (though never reaching as far as they did in 1961) before later coaching for the NBA from 1968 (including winning an NBA Finals championship with the Portland Trail Blazers in 1977) until his retirement in 1988, though he placed blame on himself for failing to stop the three seniors from taking on the fixers' money when he had the chance to do so.

== Scandal's end ==
While the inner workings of the operation were massive by the height of the scandal, the fixers were still oftentimes looking out for their own best interests instead of what best fit Molinas' group. There were times where two fixers were working with different players in the same game that was played in order to create a weird conflict of interests within a game, as well as moments where fixers would purposefully lie about fixing games or even selling games that were not fixed to other gamblers. The double-crossing from within the group also included Molinas and his own partners in crime in question; one incident that was suspected to be exactly that had Dave Goldberg and Steve Lekemetros question all four of Molinas, Green, Hacken, and Wagman before the two let everyone except Molinas leave, with Jack Molinas being hung by his ankles off the balcony of a seven-story Pittsburgh hotel room for several minutes, pleading for his life (at one point shouting out to the duo's henchmen "You ca not do this to me! I'm Jack Molinas!") before surviving for another day. Another incident had Molinas pay Joe Green to spy on Aaron Wagman in relation to something on their business venture, only for Green and Wagman to later leave the group on their own volition due to Molinas not paying them all the money he owed them. David Budin also splintered off with Frank Rosenthal as well at some point following Green and Wagman's departure from Molinas' group, though all of them would continue working on the gambling scandal in their own ways.

The smoking gun on the gambling scandal falling apart at its seams involved a couple of college football players and games that some of the fixers tried and failed to influence. Before the start of the 1960 college football season, two groups of fixers would try and fail to get some of that sport's players to join in and cooperate with the fixers to potentially rig college football games for gamblers as well. On the south side of the nation, both Aaron Wagman and University of Florida student Phil Silber were arrested in Gainesville, Florida on September 24, 1960, when they attempted to bribe Florida's fullback Jon MacBeth before their game against their in-state college rivals in Florida State University began. Meanwhile, on the northern side of the nation, David Budin, Frank Rosenthal, and one other fixer (potentially Joe Green) tried and failed to get a University of Oregon halfback named Michael "Mickey" Bruce to join in on the scheme by offering him thousands of dollars for certain stipulations at hand, including recruiting his teammate in quarterback Dave Grosz to join him in the scheme also, with a hundred dollars being given to him per week for the entire season afterward had he accepted the offer in order to keep the gamblers informed on the team's physical status throughout the season. Both games would avoid having any players accepting the gamblers' money and thus result in the Week 2 games for both Florida and Oregon to be played cleanly and fairly without outside interference affecting either game, with Florida winning 3–0 over their in-state rivals and Oregon losing 21–0 to the University of Michigan (though both MacBeth and Bruce later had to testify in court in order to prove their innocence to the judicial system). Likewise, both games would lead to key arrests from within Molinas' original group of fixers that would lead to more information about the scandal being revealed to the police, with Wagman being arrested in Florida and Budin being arrested in Ann Arbor, Michigan due in part to him registering at the same hotel that the Oregon football team did under a false name, with Rosenthal leaving Michigan before the cops would arrive for him also. While Wagman was trying to appeal to the state of Florida's court system and be freed from a five-year prison sentence (alongside a $10,000 fine, now worth $106,350 in current money values) he had initially been sentenced to there, he would later agree to help testify against Jack Molinas in an upcoming trial in New York, as well as help identify his co-conspirators in the scandal. The new informant from within would help New York City District Attorney Frank Hogan dispatch phone wiretaps and follow their activities before eventually arresting every one of the main fixers in this scandal.

On March 17, 1961, the first official arrests relating to the basketball gambling scandal properly came to light as detectives from New York City District Attorney Frank Hogan's office arrested both Aaron Wagman and Joe Hacken due to them offering bribes to college basketball players at Seton Hall University and the University of Connecticut, some of whom had already accepted said bribes before the arrests were made. Wagman (who was considered a "master fixer" according to Hogan) and his backers, which included three go-betweens in former University of Alabama basketball players Dan Quindazzi and Jerry Vogel alongside a University of Connecticut football player that was on their team at the time named William "Bill" Minnerly, inadvertently tipped off the feds by betting on the winners of a game between the University of Connecticut and Colgate University on March 3, 1961 (which ended with a blowout 71–30 win for Colgate) by going over the spread of 11 points before bookies closed bets on that game sensing correctly that a fix was in there (with the three Connecticut players that helped fix that game for Colgate later being identified as Glenn Cross, Pete Kelly, and Jack Rose). Wagman also threatened to leave the country before being caught for good by obtaining a passport following his Florida arrest, thus forcing the police to arrest him before he had the chance to do so; he later got an extra charge of bribing New York detective David Campbell added onto his original sentence in this arrest as well. Meanwhile, Hacken was tipped off by the feds on what he was doing due to him bribing two of Seton Hall University's players in Hank Gunter and Arthur "Art" Hicks on February 9, 1961, following a match between Seton Hall and the University of Dayton where a large amount of money was bet on Dayton to exceed the spread of 6 points (which turned out to far exceed that amount with Dayton blowing out Seton Hall by a 112–77 win), which tipped off bookies that a fix was on for that game in part due to Seton Hall's reputation as a joke at the time. Molinas later paid Hacken's bail of $20,000 (worth around $210,565 in 2024) since Hacken did not confess to anything to the police, with Molinas himself feeling confident that he would not get caught unless one of the players he originally bribed later turned against him. However, testimonial cooperation by Wagman, Budin, and Joe Green would eventually lead to Molinas being caught and arrested for his role as the main leader of the scheme on May 8, 1962, for three bribery charges and two attempted counts of attempted subordination of perjury.

== Names of players involved ==
A full list of players who had been involved with the scandal and had thus been implicated in it has never been fully revealed to the public as of June 6, 2024. Furthermore, no investigative action was taken against varsity players (including future All-American Don Nelson from Iowa) or other head coaches like Sharm Scheuerman that could have potentially been involved at some point as well. However, a vast majority of names that had been identified to the scandal had been uncovered over the years, including former standout basketball players turned fixers in Columbia University's Jack Molinas, Brooklyn College's David Budin, and William Howard Taft High School's Joe Green. The most notable players to have been implicated in the scandal were future Hall of Fame players Connie Hawkins from the University of Iowa and Roger Brown from the University of Dayton, but other players that had been implicated in the scandal (and by extension were mostly permanently banned from the NBA) that were also drafted in the NBA at some point (mostly in 1961) included Al Seiden and Tony Jackson from St. John's University, Jack Egan and Vincent Kempton from St. Joseph's College (now St. Joseph's University), Jerry Graves from Mississippi State University, future NBA coach Doug Moe from the University of North Carolina, and Leroy Wright from the College of the Pacific (now University of the Pacific).

Other college players that would join Leroy Wright in testifying against Molinas and his crew included Wright's teammate Gary Kaufman; Billy Reed and apparent teammate Thomas Falentino from Bowling Green State University; Salvatore Vergopia and his teammate Leonard Whalen from Niagara University; Leonard Kaplan from the University of Alabama; North Carolina State College (now North Carolina State University) teammates Donald Gallagher, Anton Muehlbauer, and Stanley Niewierowski; University of South Carolina teammates Michael Callahan, Larry Dial, Robert "Bob" Frantz, and Richard "Dick" Hoffman; and apparent players from the University of Utah as well. Additional names that had been left out of the list of players that had been indicted in the case initially included Ed Bowler from La Salle College (now La Salle University); William Chrystal and Michael Parenti from St. John's University; Glenn Cross, Pete Kelly, and Jack Rose from the University of Connecticut (as well as college football player William "Bill" Minnerly); Jack Egan, Vincent Kempton, and Frank Majewski from St. Joseph's College; Hank Gunter and Arthur "Art" Hicks from Seton Hall University (despite them being the first players to be arrested in relation to the scandal on March 17, 1961); Fred Portnoy from Molinas' own alma mater in Columbia University; Ray Paprocky (alongside at least two other players according to Charley Rosen from his book focusing primarily on Jack Molinas' life) from New York University; Terry Litchfield from North Carolina State College; Richard Fisher and Edward Test from the University of Tennessee; Louis Brown from the University of North Carolina; Dan Quindazzi and Jerry Vogel from the University of Alabama; Tim Robinson and Alphra Saunders from Bradley University; John Morgan and Charlie North from the University of Detroit (now University of Detroit Mercy); and Dick Falenski and John Fridley from the University of Pittsburgh.

According to at the time University of Illinois professor Albert Figone, the final tally for players involved included 31 players from 22 colleges that fixed games, nine players that had received money from fixers or gamblers that were never convicted of crimes, eight players that were considered go-betweens for the fixers and gamblers, and two players that had received bribe offers without reporting them to proper authorities, with speculation that more individuals were actually involved than what the numbers suggest either by students working with fixers on campuses, players that were offered bribes but never reported them to anyone, or as future gamblers whose discreet participation went unprosecuted along the way.

== Motivations from some involved individuals ==
During the prosecution and trial periods of the scandal, some of the fixers and players that had been involved in the scandal would speak out on their reasons for why they did what they did in the scandal. In an interview written for Sports Illustrated, Seton Hall's Arthur Hicks, a former high school standout from Chicago and brief Northwestern University student, told them that the gamblers sensed the highly commercialized environment of college basketball had taken the fun out of the game of basketball for players like him (to the point of even losing respect for their head coach), which makes someone like him vulnerable to accept money from gamblers. Not only that, but due to the event taking place while the civil rights movement was still going on, gamblers knew that black players in certain colleges still were not socially accepted at the time, which meant certain players like Hicks felt vindicated in throwing games against their team as payback against racist individuals in the college system and saw gamblers like Molinas, Hacken, Green, or Budin as the most reliable kind of person in their life during that time.

However, Hicks would also tell a story with him and a gambler where a game he messed up on fixing the outcome of a match he was on by letting his competitive instincts kick in led to him purchasing a pair of snubnosed .38s after being threatened to pay $100,000 (worth $1,063,500 in 2024) to a gambler directly by a certain date in order to showcase how the fixing side was not always a fun one to be on. Hicks also told a story relating to the gambler in question after rigging one of the losses during that same season that the same gambler would try and stiff him in a bar the day after, but after Hicks threatened him with one of his .38s in question being put to the gambler's head, he would get his money properly. Other players involved with the scandal also echoed the sentiments of Hicks where the fixers had an uncanny ability to sweet-talk them into going along with their schemes, with North Carolina's Louis Brown also noting that New York City detectives psychologically profiled Wagman's partner in crime, Joe Green.

When it came to some of the primary fixers, though, their motivations for fixing games were a lot more mixed in nature by comparison. Joe Green, for example, was not an individual that was fond of money himself, especially since he lived alone and frugally at that point in time; he was more so motivated by getting revenge on the perceived injustice on the collegiate (and by extension, professional) basketball circuit he felt he had by going from an outstanding New York City high school basketball player to a dropout that could not qualify for collegiate play as much as he would have wanted to, which later played into some guilt he felt afterward in bribing other players. Meanwhile, Green's partner in crime, Aaron Wagman, had a primary motive to gain power over successful athletes like he was a head coach over them by manipulating final scores and having players accept bribes to throw games on their end. He not only noted to players that games had been getting fixed for a long time now (with the first reported attempt to fix a college basketball game being in January 1927 with a pro gambler attempting to bribe Wabash College's star player, Benjamin "Benny" Devol, before a game against Franklin College of Indianapolis began, as well as the first infamous case occurring in 1945 by having five Brooklyn College players try and accept money to throw a game against the Municipal University of Akron (now University of Akron) before it actually began) without being detected well before the 1951 college basketball point-shaving scandal of 1951 happened and that throwing games can be really simple at times, but he also noted that there can be times where fixing games can be a major winning scenario for everyone involved in it. Wagman also later gave comments to the press where he admitted he was bad himself, but he also said that colleges are not clean in it either since they already spoiled the players and got them into college by a fix, but the only difference is he would have to go to jail for what he did while colleges just have to get a new team by replacing certain players and sometimes coaches and staff on a yearly basis.

With Jack Molinas, however, his interests in the life of the illicit had likely stemmed from the days when his parents owned a bar in Brooklyn at the time called "The Eagle Bar", with Jack often hearing stories from racketeers bragging and sometimes telling tall tales to him that ultimately stuck with him for the rest of his life. He would also admit his interests in gambling were not necessarily about the money he'd potentially receive from his bets, but rather the fun and excitement that gambling and moving numbers around from said gambling gave him, with winning on his bets feeling glorious to him. However, Molinas would not feel any remorse for his actions, stating that "[m]y so-called crimes hadn't hurt anybody except some bettors and some bookies". Meanwhile, Joe Hacken was considered a genuine basketball nut that previously had nine prior bookmaking convictions before his arrest in the gambling scandal. Not only that, but he was also considered to have been involved in the 1951 college basketball point-shaving scandal (though was never caught during that period of time), was the stepbrother of one of the caught fixers named Cornelius Kelleher, and had bragged about fixing his first college basketball game when he was 18 years old back in 1938.

== Trials ==
Following Molinas' arrest, a large, select number of current at the time and former college basketball players would be indicted in his trial and testify against him and the other fixers in order to maintain a sense of innocence to their names. In addition to them, fourteen other co-conspirators related to Molinas throughout the nation would also be named out to the public as well, including mobsters Vincent Gigante and Frank Rosenthal. The trial for Molinas began on October 30, 1962, with New York Supreme Court justice Joseph Sarafite overseeing the case. Key testimonies against Molinas involved a recorded conversation with Bowling Green's Billy Reed on how he could lie to the stand alongside Reed providing details on his situation with Molinas, a recorded conversation with the Pacific's Gary Kaufman being threatened with death if any of his fixers were implicated in the case, other testimonies involving players that were used in the scandal, and former Fort Wayne Pistons player and at the time coach for the Los Angeles Lakers Fred Schaus testifying that when the two of them were teammates in the NBA, he noted that Molinas was so inconsistent in terms of results and impact (one time recording a 0-point game with only one shot attempt and just one assist near the end of his time in the NBA) that it easily generated suspicions of fixing in spite of him being named an All-Star that season. The trial would not resume until January 3, 1963 due to the judge facing an illness at the time, though Molinas would be found guilty of his crimes only five days later. His attorney, Jacob Evseroff, believed that Molinas could have won his trial had he testified on his own behalf, but he was noticeably shaken up to do so on account of his relationship with the mafia and its connections to sports gambling. Both Green and Wagman were noticeably satisfied with the results of the verdict, primarily because they both agreed to plea deals where they would receive lighter sentences of three to five years in prison in New York had their ringleader been found guilty in the trial.

In addition to the trials relating to Molinas and his co-conspirators up in New York, trials relating to the scandal were also held in North Carolina. All of the players from both the University of North Carolina and North Carolina State College were given immunity from prosecution during the trials in their state in exchange for their full cooperation and testimonies against the defendants in question. According to North Carolina's solicitor general Lester Chalmers, he and University of North Carolina's system president William C. Friday sought to prosecute only the fixers because they were dealing with the protection of some otherwise innocent college kids that were being preyed upon by the wrong types of people, with Friday also believing the student-athletes would have gotten hurt or killed otherwise (though Molinas claimed that only the bookies and fixers would get hurt from time to time). What made the trials in North Carolina unique from the other trials at hand was that the state prosecutions related to the fixing of actual college basketball games instead of crimes that would normally be expected from a gambling case like perjury or fraud, partially because of them being a direct factor in ending the Dixie Classic basketball tournament for good after twelve years of existence. In its first set of indictments released in the month of September 1961, in addition to naming the four men that previously supported Molinas, the likes of Charles Tucker and Bob Kraw as well as go-betweens in Louis Barshak and Michael Siegel were also named as those involved in the case out in North Carolina. Following that, a second set of indictments released in January 1962 also added the names of Dave Goldberg, Steve Lekemetros, Morris Heyison, Frank Cardone, Jake Israel, Paul Walker, and Peter Martino as more names implicated in the North Carolina trials.

=== Verdicts from the trials ===
On February 11, 1963, Jack Molinas was initially given a sentence of ten to fifteen years in prison which was to have been served concurrently due to two of his sentences involving perjury and bribing Bowling Green's Billy Reed directly each being given sentences of five to seven-and-a-half years in prison, with Molinas being eligible for parole after six years and eight months served by the judgment of Joseph Sarafite. Before his trial even began, Molinas previously refused the prosecution's offer of a six-month jail term if he had just agreed to plead guilty early and forfeit his attorney's license he had obtained earlier on while going to the Brooklyn Law School in New York before being arrested. However, after appealing his case, he would ultimately reduce his prison sentence to between seven and a half years and twelve and a half years in prison instead. While in the Attica Correctional Facility, he would help Frank Hogan expose both the fixing of harness racing tracks in New York and a checking scam of sorts, both of which would lead to Molinas getting an early release from prison in 1968. Not only that, but he would also be the inspiration to Burt Reynolds' character of Paul "Wrecking" Crewe in the 1974 version of The Longest Yard.

For the other individuals that were tried in the New York case, Joe Hacken would receive a seven-and-a-half to eight-year prison sentence as one of the other major contributors to the scandal, while Joe Green got a six to seven-year prison sentence as a major contributor that later accepted a plea bargain and Aaron Wagman served five to ten years in prison due to his attempted college football fix in Florida. David Budin would get off the lightest of the main contributors of Molinas' main group in New York with a suspended sentence there, similar to that of associate Charles Tucker. Speaking of Molinas' associates involved, Philip La Court would receive a two to five-year prison sentence for his involvement in the scandal, while other individuals like Dave Goldberg, Steve Lekemetros, Morris Heyison, Frank Cardone, and Paul Walker had their sentences served in North Carolina instead. Meanwhile, Ralph Gigante (brother of Vincent Gigante) had no known court record confirming that he had served any time in prison in relation to the gambling scandal. Finally, North Carolina University's Louis Brown and the University of Alabama's Dan Quindazzi and Jerry Vogel were all given suspended sentences with lengthy probation periods due to them being recruiter-players for the gambling scandal.

Finally, with the North Carolina trials fully indicting the individuals that tried to bribe the six players named in the scandal from the University of North Carolina and North Carolina State College by November 1962, Paul Walker alongside the aforementioned Green and Wagman all pled guilty to the North Carolina trial in exchange for testifying against everyone else involved in the trials there. Both Frank Cardone and Morris Heyison ended up avoiding the North Carolina trials entirely by fighting extradition cases from the state of Pennsylvania during that period of time. However, both Dave Goldberg and Steve Lekemetros would end up being convicted and sentenced to five years in prison, with Goldberg being fined $21,000 (worth around $218,900 in 2024) and Lekemetros being fined $9,000 (worth around $93,815 in 2024). The two individuals also received three year suspended sentences for each of the respective sixteen and fourteen accounts they had, with them unsuccessfully appealing their sentences and ordered payments for fines and court costs all the way up to the Supreme Court of the United States. Both Louis Barshak and Michael Siegel would also receive three year suspended sentences themselves, albeit without any extra stipulations added onto them. As for the individuals that plead guilty for plea agreements, Paul Walker was sentenced to eighteen months in prison, while Joe Green received a three to five year suspended sentence on top of his original sentence from New York, and Aaron Wagman received a three to five year suspended sentence on top of his original sentence relating to his conviction back in Florida. Finally, Joe Hacken would end up serving the sentence that he would have received in North Carolina up in New York instead.

== Aftermath ==
Following the end of the scandal, at least five different individuals involved in the scandal would continue to engage in various criminal behaviors. Following Jack Molinas' release from prison in 1968, he would move to Los Angeles, California and work with imported furs and pornography shipments from Taiwan with the mob there; this would lead to another arrest in 1973 followed by a partner-in-crime of his there named Bernard Gusoff being beaten to death a year later before Molinas was shot to death by Joseph Ullo in 1975. Meanwhile, Thomas Eboli would later become a front boss of the Genovese crime family before being murdered in 1972 in his quest to become the proper head boss there, while Vincent Gigante would eventually end up becoming the head boss of the Genovese crime family in 1981 up until his death in 2005. Frank Rosenthal would later move to Las Vegas, Nevada in order to create the state's first sports book that operated within a casino (albeit illegally so with multiple casinos secretly ran by the Chicago Outfit) before eventually being banned from the state in 1987 and 1991 after wild and crazy shenanigans involving him occurred there before eventually dying from a heart attack in 2008. Finally, David Budin would eventually find his name in the news again in 1998 alongside his son, Steve Budin, when they were both arrested for taking one of the first sports betting web companies created, SDB Global (later renamed SBG Global), and providing conflicting areas of interest with it operating between Costa Rica and Miami, Florida simultaneously. David Budin would later plead guilty for violating a 1961 Wire Communications Act law in relation to the conflict of interests, while his son Steve would be deferred fines of $2.5 million.

Unlike the 1951 college basketball point-shaving scandal that saw most of the affected colleges and universities get hindered pretty badly by the long-term consequences, very few of the schools affected by the gambling scandal would see any major long-term consequences affecting their standings. Outside of the 1960–61 Saint Joseph's Hawks losing their third place standing (which they have yet to replicate a Final Four placing as of 2024, though they had come close to it multiple times, including in 2024) and the Dixie Classic being permanently shut down, every team that had players involved in the scandal would still maintain at least one other NCAA tournament appearance following the scandal, with the University of Connecticut winning six different NCAA tournament championships (including more recent tournaments in 2023 and 2024) since 1999. The only university that would struggle following its involvement with the scandal was New York University; following their previous involvement with having a player shaving points in the 1951 CCNY scandal, having the university discover at least one other player would be involved in another scandal a decade later would further damage the reputation of the team's basketball program after they had made strides to try and move past that with their appearance in the 1960 NCAA tournament. With the combination of players being involved in multiple scandals fixing college sports games and the university facing financial troubles entering the 1970s, NYU decided to shut down their sports programs entirely by 1971 before rebranding themselves as a Division III program in 1983 with greater success there since then.

All current at the time or former players that had been involved in the scandal would soon see permanent bannings from the NBA (with Connie Hawkins later getting his ban reversed and both Hawkins and Roger Brown later being named Basketball Hall of Famers for their careers after the scandal), as well as getting themselves expelled from college if they had not already graduated from college before being caught already, although some players that had been expelled early on would later graduate in future classes like the players from St. Joseph's University. Not only that, but some of these players would also see additional sentences by the judicial system as well, especially those that were considered go-betweens. However, some of these same players would later receive a second opportunity at professional play through the American Basketball League (mostly with players being drafted by the new league) and later the American Basketball Association (with commissioner George Mikan forgiving some of the players that participated in the event alongside Charlie Williams from Seattle University, who was later banned from the NBA himself in relation to the scandal despite Williams being allowed to play for his collegiate career) allowing a few of these guys a new opportunity to play professional basketball after the scandal ruined their chances at the NBA. It would be through those opportunities that Hawkins and Brown would eventually be named into the Naismith Basketball Hall of Fame decades later.

This scandal also revealed to the United States that college sports gambling was not just an isolated problem within certain areas of the nation, but it was a national problem that would only get worse if further action was not taken to stop it in its tracks. Following the scandal coming to light by the public eye, attorney general and future senator Robert F. Kennedy (alongside New York Senator Kenneth Keating and FBI Director J. Edgar Hoover) would begin to be more aggressive against organized crime and investigate their influence upon sports in order to prevent another widespread gambling or point-shaving scandal similar to this case from occurring again in the near future. Following the scandal's ending, the Federal Wire Act was signed into law by Robert's brother, President John F. Kennedy, on September 13, 1961, ensuring that official punishments like fines and/or prison time will come to light for any future criminals that wish to engage with interstate betting on sports games through wired communication purposes. Since then, further federal laws relating to gambling have been passed to help ensure the safety of games played in both collegiate and professional circuits in the United States, with acts like the Indian Gaming Regulatory Act, the Professional and Amateur Sports Protection Act of 1992, the National Gambling Impact Study Commission Act, the SAFE Port Act, and the Unlawful Internet Gambling Enforcement Act of 2006 all looking to help further discourage the action of gambling in sports from occurring. However, the U.S. Supreme Court would later rule the Professional and Amateur Sports Protection Act of 1992 to be completely unconstitutional following the case of Murphy v. National Collegiate Athletic Association (formerly titled Christie v. National Collegiate Athletic Association), which made numerous states hold legalized sports betting in that case's aftermath.

== See also ==
- 1951 college basketball point-shaving scandal
- 1961 NCAA University Division basketball tournament
- 1960–61 Saint Joseph's Hawks men's basketball team
- Dixie Classic – A now-defunct NCAA tournament based in North Carolina that was shut down in relation to the scandal.
- List of people banned or suspended by the NBA
- New York District Attorney Frank Hogan
- Jack Molinas
- Thomas Eboli
- Vincent Gigante
- Frank Rosenthal
- Frank Hogan
- Connie Hawkins
- Roger Brown
- Jerry Graves
- Tony Jackson
- Doug Moe
- Al Seiden
- Leroy Wright
