= 1958–59 St. John's Redmen basketball team =

American college basketball season

1958–59 St. John's Redmen men's basketball

ECAC Holiday Festival Champions NIT Champions

NIT Championship vs. Bradley, W, 76-71 2OT
- Conference: Metropolitan New York Conference

Ranking
- Coaches: No. 17
- Record: 20–6 (4–2 Metropolitan New York Conference)
- Head coach: Joseph Lapchick
- Assistant coach: Lou Carnesecca
- Captain: Al Seiden
- Home arena: Martin Van Buren High School; Madison Square Garden

1958–59 Metropolitan New York Conference men's basketball standings
	Conf.				Overall
Team	W		L	PCT	W		L	PCT
Manhattan	4	–	0	1.000	15	–	6	.714
Brooklyn	3	–	1	.750	8	–	10	.444
St. John's	4	–	2	.667	20	–	6	.769
Fordham	2	–	2	.500	17	–	8	.680
NYU	2	–	2	.500	15	–	8	.652
CCNY	1	–	6	.143	6	–	12	.333
St. Francis (NY)	0	–	3	.000	5	–	18	.217
Rankings from AP Poll

The 1958–59 St. John's Redmen basketball team represented St. John's University during the 1958–59 NCAA Division I college basketball season. The team was coached by Joseph Lapchick in his fourteenth year at the school and also was the first season Lou Carnesecca joined the basketball program as an assistant coach. The team was a member of the Metropolitan New York Conference. During this time the university was transitioning from Brooklyn to Queens, so the basketball team played their home games at Martin Van Buren High School in Queens, NY and Madison Square Garden in Manhattan while their new on campus arena, Alumni Hall, was being built.

== Roster ==
#	Name	Height	Position	Class	Hometown	Previous Team(s)
11	Gus Alfieri	6'2"	G	Sr.	Brooklyn, NY, U.S.	St. Francis Prep
14	Gary Marozas	6'6"	F/C	So.	Queens, NY, U.S.	Forest Hills HS
21	Mike Pedone	6'0"	G	Jr.	Jersey City, NJ, U.S.	St. Peter's Prep
24	Tony Jackson	6"4"	G/F	So.	Brooklyn, NY, U.S.	Thomas Jefferson HS
25	Bernie Pascal (DNP)	6'5"	F	Sr.	Brooklyn, NY, U.S.	St. Francis Prep
27	Dick Engert	6"5"	F	Sr.	Brooklyn, NY, U.S.	Xavier HS
33	Alan Seiden	5"10"	G	Sr.	Queens, NY, U.S.	Jamaica HS
34	Lou Roethel	6"6"	F/C	Sr.	Brooklyn, NY, U.S.	St. Francis Prep
	John Ryan	6'6"	F/C	Jr.	Long Beach, NY, U.S.	Long Beach HS
	Butch Dellacave	5'9"	G	So.	Brooklyn, NY, U.S.	St. John's Prep

== Schedule and results ==
Date time, TV	Rank^{#}	Opponent^{#}	Result	Record	Site city, state
Regular Season
12/04/58*		Providence	W 73-55	1-0	Madison Square Garden; New York, NY
12/08/58*		Bridgeport	W 98-56	2-0	Martin Van Buren High School; Queens, NY
12/10/58	No. 20	at Brooklyn	W 93-68	3-0 (1-0)	Brooklyn College; Brooklyn, NY
12/13/58*	No. 20	Bradley	L 66-71	3-1	Madison Square Garden; New York, NY
12/15/58*	No. 20	Hunter	W 91-52	4-1	Martin Van Buren High School; Queens, NY
12/20/58*		Virginia	W 90-71	5-1	Madison Square Garden; New York, NY
12/26/58*		vs. Holy Cross; ECAC Holiday Festival Quarterfinal	W 77-63	6-1	Madison Square Garden; New York, NY
12/27/58*		vs. No. 20 Dayton; ECAC Holiday Festival Semifinal	W 76-63	7-1	Madison Square Garden; New York, NY
12/29/58*		vs. St. Joseph's; ECAC Holiday Festival Championship	W 90-79	8-1	Madison Square Garden; New York, NY
01/03/59*	No. 13	Temple	W 81-76	9-1	Madison Square Garden; New York, NY
01/10/59*	No. 10	at George Washington	W 86-85	10-1	Uline Arena; Washington, D.C.
01/17/59*	No. 9	at St. Joseph's	W 97-72	11-1	The Palestra; Philadelphia, PA
01/24/59	No. 7	vs. St. Francis (NY)	W 91-44	12-1 (2-0)	69th Regiment Armory; New York, NY
01/29/59*	No. 7	at No. 15 St. Louis	L 68-72	12-2	Kiel Auditorium; St. Louis, MO
01/31/59*	No. 7	at Loyola (IL)	L 85-95 ^{2OT}	12-3	Chicago Stadium; Chicago, IL
02/02/59*	No. 7	at Notre Dame	L 70-72	12-4	Notre Dame Fieldhouse; Notre Dame, IN
02/05/59*	No. 15	Richmond	W 85-76	13-4	Madison Square Garden; New York, NY
02/14/59	No. 19	at Fordham	L 77-79 ^{OT}	13-5 (2-1)	Rose Hill Gymnasium; Bronx, NY
02/19/59*		Niagara	W 87-78	14-5	Madison Square Garden; New York, NY
02/26/59	No. 17	Manhattan	L 65-70	14-6 (2-2)	Madison Square Garden; New York, NY
02/28/59	No. 17	CCNY	W 82-64	15-6 (3-2)	Martin Van Buren High School; Queens, NY
03/05/59	No. 18	NYU	W 57-55	16-6 (4-2)	Madison Square Garden; New York, NY
NIT
03/12/59*		vs. Villanova; NIT First Round	W 75-67	17-6	Madison Square Garden; New York, NY
03/14/59*		vs. No. 19 St. Bonaventure; NIT Quarterfinal	W 82-74	18-6	Madison Square Garden; New York, NY
03/19/59*		vs. Providence; NIT Semifinal	W 76-55	19-6	Madison Square Garden; New York, NY
03/21/59*		vs. No. 4 Bradley; NIT Championship	W 76-71 ^{2OT}	20-6	Madison Square Garden; New York, NY
*Non-conference game. ^{#}Rankings from AP Poll. (#) Tournament seedings in parentheses.

== Team players drafted into the NBA ==
Year	Round	Pick	Player	NBA club
1959	2	12	Al Seiden	St. Louis Hawks
1961	2	24	Tony Jackson	New York Knicks
