= Al Seiden =

American basketball player (1937–2008)

Personal information
- Born: May 1, 1937 New York City, New York, U.S.
- Died: May 3, 2008 (aged 71)
- Listed height: 5 ft 10 in (1.78 m)
- Listed weight: 170 lb (77 kg)

Career information
- High school: Jamaica (Queens, New York)
- College: St. John's (1956–1959)
- NBA draft: 1959: 2nd round, 14th overall pick
- Drafted by: St. Louis Hawks
- Position: Point guard
- Number: 33

Career history
- 1961–1962: Pittsburgh Rens

Career highlights
- Consensus second-team All-American (1959); Haggerty Award (1959)
- Stats at Basketball Reference

Alan Seiden (May 1, 1937 – May 3, 2008) was an American collegiate and professional basketball player. He led St. John's University to the 1959 National Invitation Tournament title and later played professionally with the Pittsburgh Rens of the American Basketball League. Seiden was so highly respected by his peers that it took the NYC Basketball Hall of Fame only five years to induct him (1995).

Seiden was a New York City schoolboy star at Jamaica High School, leading his team to the PSAL title in 1955 as a senior. He chose to stay close to home for college, playing for Hall of Fame coach Joe Lapchick at St. John's University. Seiden became a star at St. John's, leading the Redmen to two straight National Invitation Tournaments in 1958 and 1959. Seiden averaged 20.4 and 21.9 points per game as a junior and senior and ended his Redmen career with 1,374 points. He served as team captain both seasons

He won a gold medal in basketball with Team USA in the 1957 Maccabiah Games, and was the top scorer in the tournament.

In 1959, Seiden led the Redmen to the NIT title as the unseeded 17–9 squad upset the field to win a tournament that was then seen as prestigious as the NCAA tournament. Seiden capped his senior season by being named a consensus second team All-American and won the Haggerty Award as the top player in the New York City metro area.

After his college career ended, Seiden was drafted in the second round of the 1959 NBA draft by the St. Louis Hawks. He failed to make the roster, and played for the next few years in the Eastern Professional Basketball League and in 1961 with the Pittsburgh Rens of the American Basketball League. He would also play semi-professionally and in the summer, notably playing with indicted CCNY point-shaving scandal players Eddie Gard and Jack Molinas, the latter of whom would also be involved with the 1961 NCAA University Division men's basketball gambling scandal as well.

Seiden died on May 3, 2008, of complications from stroke.

In March 2011, he was inducted into the National Jewish Sports Hall of Fame.
