= H. E. Kirchner =

American basketball player (1937–1993)

Personal information
- Born: June 13, 1937 Houston, Texas, U.S.
- Died: February 20, 1993 (aged 55) Dripping Springs, Texas, U.S.
- Listed height: 6 ft 10 in (2.08 m)
- Listed weight: 240 lb (109 kg)

Career information
- High school: Reagan (Houston, Texas)
- College: TCU (1956–1959)
- NBA draft: 1959: 5th round, 33rd overall pick
- Drafted by: Cincinnati Royals
- Position: Center

Career highlights
- AP Honorable mention All-American (1959); SWC Player of the Year (1959)
- Stats at Basketball Reference

Harry Ernest Kirchner Jr. (June 13, 1937 – February 20, 1993) was an American college basketball player. He played for the TCU Horned Frogs from 1956 to 1959.

== Basketball career ==
Standing 6 ft 10 in (2.08 m), Kirchner was the tallest Horned Frogs player until the mid-1970s. He was a starter for two seasons and led the Horned Frogs to a Southwest Conference (SWC) championship in 1959. During the 1958–59 season, Kirchner was named as the SWC Player of the Year while he led the SWC in scoring (19.6 points) and rebounding (13.4 rebounds) per game.

Kirchner was selected by the Cincinnati Royals as the 33rd overall pick of the 1959 NBA draft. He played two seasons for the Phillips 66ers of the National Industrial Basketball League (NIBL) from 1959 to 1961.

Kirchner was inducted into the TCU Lettermen's Hall of Fame in 2012.

== Post-playing career ==
Kirchner worked with super computers and robotics. He last worked as a senior sales representative at Cray Research.

== Personal life ==
Kirchner married his wife, Phyllis Carol Beckman, on July 13, 1958. They had two children. He died on February 20, 1993, at his home in Dripping Springs, Texas.
