= 1959 National Invitation Tournament =

Annual NCAA basketball competition

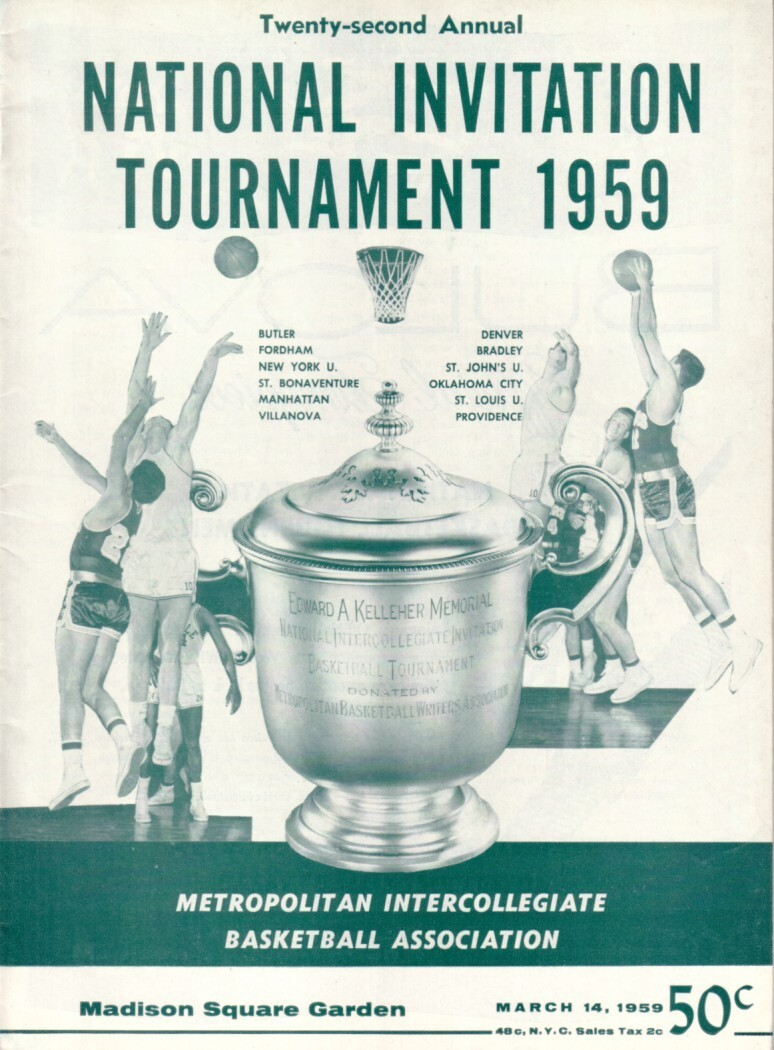
- Season: 1958–59
- Teams: 12
- Finals site: Madison Square Garden, New York City
- Champions: St. John's Redmen (3rd title)
- Runner-up: Bradley Braves (3rd title game)
- Semifinalists: NYU Violets (3rd semifinal); Providence (1st semifinal)
- Winning coach: Joe Lapchick (2nd title)
- MVP: Tony Jackson (St. John's)

The 1959 National Invitation Tournament was the 1959 edition of the annual NCAA college basketball competition.

== Selected teams ==
Below is a list of the 12 teams selected for the tournament.

Team	Conference	Overall record	Appearance	Last bid
Bradley	Missouri Valley	23–3	8th	1958
Butler	Independent	18–8	2nd	1958
Denver	Skyline	14–9	1st	Never
Fordham	Metro New York	17–7	3rd	1958
Manhattan	Metro New York	14–6	7th	1957
NYU	Metro New York	12–7	5th	1952
Oklahoma City	Independent	20–6	1st	Never
Providence	Independent	18–5	1st	Never
St. Bonaventure	Independent	20–2	5th	1958
St. John's	Metro New York	16–6	14th	1958
Saint Louis	Missouri Valley	20–5	8th	1956
Villanova	Independent	18–6	1st	Never

== Bracket ==
Below is the tournament bracket.

First round
Butler	94
Fordham	80
NYU	90
Denver	81
Providence	68
Manhattan	66
St. John's	75
Villanova	67

Quarterfinals
Butler	77
Bradley	83
Oklahoma City	48
NYU	63
Providence	75
Saint Louis	72
St. Bonaventure	74
St. John's	82

Semifinals
Bradley	59
NYU	57
Providence	55
St. John's	76

Finals
Bradley	71
St. John's	76

Third place game
NYU	71
Providence	57

== See also ==
- 1959 NCAA University Division basketball tournament
- 1959 NCAA College Division basketball tournament
- 1959 NAIA Division I men's basketball tournament
