= 1958–59 Auburn Tigers men's basketball team =

American college basketball season

1958–59 Auburn Tigers men's basketball

Birmingham Classic champions
- Conference: Southeastern Conference

Ranking
- Coaches: No. 10
- AP: No. 8
- Record: 20–2 (12–2 SEC)
- Head coach: Joel Eaves (10th season)
- Captains: Rex Frederick; Jimmy Lee
- Home arena: Auburn Sports Arena

The 1958–59 Auburn Tigers men's basketball team represented Auburn University in the 1958–59 college basketball season. The team's head coach was Joel Eaves, who was in his tenth season at Auburn. The team played their home games at Auburn Sports Arena in Auburn, Alabama. They finished the season 20–2, 12–2 in SEC play.
