= Leo Byrd =

American basketball player (1936–1991)

Personal information
- Born: June 30, 1936 Kimball, West Virginia
- Died: July 20, 1991 (aged 54) Huntington, West Virginia
- Listed height: 6 ft 1 in (1.85 m)
- Listed weight: 170 lb (77 kg)

Career information
- High school: Huntington (Huntington, West Virginia)
- College: Marshall (1956–1959)
- NBA draft: 1959: 4th round, 25th overall pick
- Drafted by: Cincinnati Royals
- Position: Guard
- Number: 44

Career highlights
- Consensus second-team All-American (1959); 2× First-team All-MAC (1958, 1959); No. 44 retired by Marshall Thundering Herd
- Stats at Basketball Reference
Medals
Representing United States
Men's basketball
Pan American Games
Gold medal – first place	1959 Chicago	Team competition

Leo Wesley Byrd (June 30, 1936 – July 20, 1991) was an NCAA All-American basketball player for Marshall College whose career spanned from 1956–57 to 1958–59. He also won a gold medal at the 1959 Pan American Games for Team USA after the squad finished with a 6–0 record. It was the first Pan American Games to be played in the United States as well.

== Early life ==
Byrd was born and raised in Huntington, West Virginia and was the son of a Methodist minister. At age 12, he was stricken with infantile paralysis (polio), but he eventually recovered to a full, normal life. Byrd attended Huntington High School and became a prolific scorer. During his senior year of 1954–55, he averaged a state-record 34.2 points per game (ppg) for a season total of 889 points. He led the school to a 22–4 record en route to the Class A state championship game and shattered the three-game tournament's previous scoring record of 93 points – Byrd scored 128 points with games of 48, 49 and 31 points, respectively. Over that season he scored 40 or more points six times, including a career-high 56 against Bluefield, one of the larger schools. Despite his scoring ability, his high school coach lauded his "team" concept of basketball.

== College ==
Byrd enrolled at Marshall College (now called Marshall University) in 1955. Due to NCAA rules that freshmen were not allowed to play on varsity sports, he was forced to participate on the school's freshmen men's basketball team for the 1955–56 season. A 6 ft 1 in (1.85 m) guard, Byrd had to wait until the following season to play for the varsity team.

As a sophomore in 1956–57, he played in all 24 games and averaged 16.4 ppg. The next season, Byrd once again played in 24 games but this time his scoring jumped up to 24.9 ppg. He led the Mid-American Conference (MAC) in scoring for the first time and compiled 599 points on the year. Playing in the era before the three-point shot, Byrd made 214 field goals and 171 free throws. He also holds the distinction as being the first player from Marshall to lead the MAC in scoring.

In 1958–59, Byrd's senior season, he led the MAC in scoring for a second consecutive time; his 29.3 ppg average en route to 704 total points were tops in the league. Once again, Byrd played in 24 games for a third straight season, bringing his career totals to 72 games played and 1,705 points scored. At the end of the season, Byrd was named a consensus Second Team All-American.

== Post-college career ==
Leo Byrd was selected as the 25th overall pick in the 1959 NBA draft by the Cincinnati Royals. He never ended up playing professionally, however.

Instead, Byrd was named as one of 14 players to represent the United States at the 1959 Pan American Games. This team also contained future Hall of Famers Oscar Robertson and Jerry West. The 1959 Pan American Games—only the third PanAm Games ever—were played in Chicago. The United States had won the gold medal at both previous Games, and Byrd was on the squad that won its third gold after finishing the tournament 6–0. Byrd played in four of the six contests and scored 10 points (2.5 ppg). He shot 4-for-9 from the field and 2-for-4 from the free throw line. Byrd's competitive playing career effectively ended after his stint with Team USA.
