= Johnny Green (basketball) =

American basketball player (1933–2023)

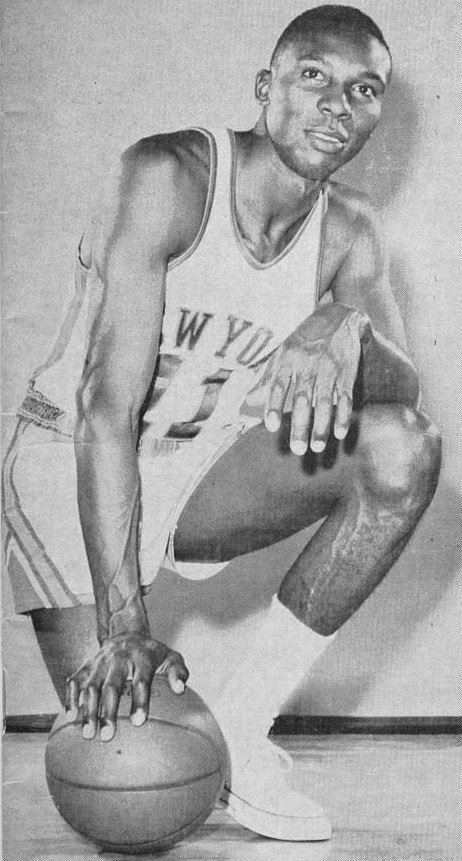
- Green, circa 1964

Personal information
- Born: December 8, 1933 Dayton, Ohio, U.S.
- Died: November 16, 2023 (aged 89) Huntington, New York, U.S.
- Listed height: 6 ft 5 in (1.96 m)
- Listed weight: 200 lb (91 kg)

Career information
- High school: Dunbar (Dayton, Ohio)
- College: Michigan State (1956–1959)
- NBA draft: 1959: 1st round, 5th overall pick
- Drafted by: New York Knicks
- Playing career: 1959–1973
- Position: Power forward
- Number: 11, 24, 16, 12, 20

Career history
- 1959–1965: New York Knicks
- 1965–1967: Baltimore Bullets
- 1967–1968: San Diego Rockets
- 1968–1969: Philadelphia 76ers
- 1969–1973: Cincinnati Royals / Kansas City-Omaha Kings

Career highlights
- 4× NBA All-Star (1962, 1963, 1965, 1971); Consensus second-team All-American (1959); Second-team All-American – NABC, INS (1958); Third-team All-American – AP, UPI (1958); No. 24 retired by Michigan State Spartans

Career NBA statistics
- Points: 12,281 (11.6 ppg)
- Rebounds: 9,083 (8.6 rpg)
- Assists: 1,449 (1.4 apg)
- Stats at NBA.com
- Stats at Basketball Reference

John Michael Green (December 8, 1933 – November 16, 2023), nicknamed "Jumpin' Johnny", was an American professional basketball player in the National Basketball Association (NBA). He played college basketball for the Michigan State Spartans, earning consensus second-team All-American honors. He was a four-time NBA All-Star.

== Early life ==
John Michael Green was born in Dayton, Ohio, on December 8, 1933. He attended Paul Laurence Dunbar High School. Green was under six feet tall in high school and didn't play basketball. He worked part-time at a Dayton bowling alley and, after graduation, for a construction company and at a junkyard for six months before joining the U.S. Marine Corps during the Korean War. It was while in the military that, at age 20, he sprouted to 6-foot-5 and played on the base's basketball team.

The Marine base football coach, Dick Evans, a Michigan State University (then College) alumnus, recognized Green's athletic ability and wrote a letter of recommendation to MSU basketball coach Forddy Anderson. Green, by then age 21, visited MSU while on leave in October 1955.

== College career ==
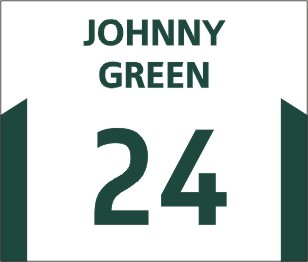
Green's #24 was retired by Michigan State University

After completing his military commitment, Green enrolled at Michigan State in 1955, and played on the 1955–56 Spartans' freshman team. He became eligible to play on the varsity in January 1957, at age 23.

Green played in 18 games that season as a power forward, setting a new Michigan State rebounding record with 14.6 per game as the Spartans were Big Ten champions. They advanced to the NCAA tournament semifinal game, which they lost in triple overtime to eventual champion North Carolina despite Green's 19 rebounds and eight blocked shots. The Spartans finished the season winning 12 out of 13 games to end with a 16–10 overall record.

As a junior in 1957–58, he increased his per-game rebounding average to 17.8 while averaging 18.0 points per game on 53.8 percent field goal shooting. He was named second-team All-American by NABC and The Sporting News and third-team All-American by the Associated Press (AP), United Press International (UPI) and the Helms Foundation.

In 1958–59, he led the Spartans to another Big Ten title and a 19–4 record, falling a game short of the NCAA Final Four. Averaging 18.5 points and 16.6 rebounds per game, he earned first-team All-American honors from the Helms Foundation and was second-team All-American of AP, UPI, NABC and The Sporting News.

While in college, he was married and in 1957 Green's wife gave birth to sons Jeffery and Johnny.

Green's career rebounding average was 16.4 per game, topped in Big Ten history by only hall-of-famer Jerry Lucas' 17.2. He remains third on the Spartans' all-time career rebounding list with 1,036 – in less than three seasons. He also averaged 16.9 points per game, scoring 1,062 overall.

Green was also named first-team All-Big Ten for three years and was named Big Ten MVP in 1958–59.

Michigan State named an annual rebounding award in Green's honor. His jersey number 24 was retired by Michigan State. He was inducted into the MSU Athletics Hall of Fame in 1992.

== Professional career ==
Green was a first-round draft pick (fifth overall) in the 1959 NBA draft by the New York Knicks.

In his rookie season of 1959–60 for the Knicks, during which he turned age 26, he played nearly 18 minutes per game, averaging 7.0 points and 7.8 rebounds. On February 26, 1960, against the Philadelphia Warriors, he set a Knicks rookie record that still stands with 25 rebounds.

His playing time increased in 1960–61, when he averaged 10.2 points and 10.7 rebounds. He was a full-time starter in 1961–62, averaging 15.9 points and 13.3 rebounds, leading the team in rebounds with 1,066, and he was named to the NBA All-Star Game. In February 1962, he set Knicks team record with three consecutive games of 20 or more rebounds (since tied by Walt Bellamy, Willis Reed and Tyson Chandler).

In 1962–63 his scoring average was a career-high 18.1 along with 12.1 rebounds per game, and he again led the Knicks with 964 rebounds. He was named an NBA All-Star for the second time.

Green's playing time dipped slightly in 1963–64, but he still averaged 14.5 points and 10.0 rebounds per game including a season-high 27 points on November 16, 1963, against the Cincinnati Royals. He also led the Knicks in rebounding for a third consecutive season with 799.

In 1964–65, he averaged 11.0 points and 7.0 rebounds and was named an NBA all-star for the third time. He had a season-high 33 points on December 30, 1964, against the San Francisco Warriors.

He was traded along with Johnny Egan, Jim Barnes and cash from the Knicks to the Baltimore Bullets for Walt Bellamy on November 1, 1965. For the season, he averaged 11.6 points and 8.2 rebounds per game and his .536 field goal percentage ranked second in the league. In 1966–67 with the Bullets, in a part-time role he averaged 8.2 points and 6.5 rebounds.

On May 1, 1967, he was drafted by the San Diego Rockets in the NBA expansion draft. During the 1967–68 season, he played in 42 games for the Rockets, averaging over 25 minutes per game. On January 11, 1968, he was traded to the Philadelphia 76ers, for whom he played 35 games in a reduced role, averaging just over 10 minutes per game. For the season, he averaged 13.9 points and 10.1 rebounds per game.

In 1968–69, during which he turned 35 years old, he again averaged just over 10 minutes per game with the 76ers, averaging a career-low 4.7 points and 4.5 points per game. After the season, he was released by the 76ers.

However, just when it appeared Green's NBA career might be over after 10 seasons, in September 1969 he called Cincinnati Royals coach Bob Cousy and asked for a tryout. He signed as a free agent with the Royals and had a career resurgence in the 1969–70 season. He became a starter for the Royals, averaging 15.6 points and 10.8 rebounds per game while leading the NBA in field goal percentage at .559. He had a season-high 32 points on March 11, 1970, against the Boston Celtics and averaged 23.5 points per game over the final seven games.

The resurgence continued in 1970–71 – at age 37, he again led the NBA in field goal percentage at .587, averaging 16.7 points and 8.7 rebounds per game – and he was named an NBA all-star for the fourth time in his career. On December 20, 1970, he had one of his best-ever games, scoring a career-high 39 points in a one-point double-overtime loss to the Detroit Pistons.

There wasn't much fall-off in 1971–72. Although he turned 38, he played in all 82 games, averaging 9.8 points and 6.8 rebounds per game.

The following season, 1972–73, the Royals franchise relocated and became the Kansas City-Omaha Kings. But despite turning 39, he remained a significant contributor, playing nearly 19 minutes per game and averaging 7.1 points and 5.5 rebounds per game. It was his final NBA season.

Green tallied 12,281 points and 9,083 rebounds in his 14-year career, with per-game averages of 11.6 points and 8.6 rebounds with a career .493 field goal percentage.

== After basketball ==
Green entered the restaurant business and owned one of the most popular McDonald's franchises in the world in Springfield Gardens, New York, near John F. Kennedy International Airport.

Green lived in Dix Hills, New York. He died at a hospital in Huntington, New York, on November 16, 2023, at the age of 89.

== Career statistics ==
Legend
| GP | Games played | GS | Games started | MPG | Minutes per game |
| FG% | Field goal percentage | 3P% | 3-point field goal percentage | FT% | Free throw percentage |
| RPG | Rebounds per game | APG | Assists per game | SPG | Steals per game |
| BPG | Blocks per game | PPG | Points per game | **Bold** | Career high |
| * | Led the league |

=== NBA ===
==== Regular season ====
| Year | Team | GP | GS | MPG | FG% | FT% | RPG | APG | PPG |
|---|---|---|---|---|---|---|---|---|---|
| 1959–60 | New York | 69 | | 17.9 | .447 | .406 | 7.8 | .8 | 7.0 |
| 1960–61 | New York | 78 | | 22.9 | .430 | .522 | 10.7 | 1.2 | 10.2 |
| 1961–62 | New York | 80* | | **34.9** | .436 | .601 | **13.3** | **2.4** | 15.9 |
| 1962–63 | New York | 80* | | 31.9 | .462 | .638 | 12.1 | 1.9 | **18.1** |
| 1963–64 | New York | 80 | | 26.7 | .470 | .497 | 10.0 | 2.0 | 14.5 |
| 1964–65 | New York | 78 | | 22.1 | .469 | .548 | 7.0 | 1.7 | 11.0 |
| 1965–66 | New York | 7 | | 29.7 | .544 | .484 | 10.6 | 1.6 | 14.4 |
| 1965–66 | Baltimore | 72 | | 20.0 | .535 | .524 | 7.9 | 1.3 | 11.3 |
| 1966–67 | Baltimore | 61 | | 15.5 | .465 | .464 | 6.5 | .9 | 8.2 |
| 1967–68 | San Diego | 42 | | 25.5 | .458 | .472 | 10.1 | 1.4 | 13.9 |
| 1967–68 | Philadelphia | 35 | | 10.5 | .460 | .470 | 3.5 | .6 | 5.1 |
| 1968–69 | Philadelphia | 74 | | 10.7 | .518 | .456 | 4.5 | .6 | 4.7 |
| 1969–70 | Cincinnati | 78 | | 29.2 | .559* | .592 | 10.8 | 1.4 | 15.6 |
| 1970–71 | Cincinnati | 75 | | 28.6 | .587* | .617 | 8.7 | 1.2 | 16.7 |
| 1971–72 | Cincinnati | **82** | | 23.3 | .569 | .564 | 6.8 | 1.5 | 9.8 |
| 1972–73 | Kansas City–Omaha | 66 | | 18.9 | **.599** | **.679** | 5.5 | .9 | 7.1 |
| Career | | 1,057 | | 23.3 | .493 | .553 | 8.6 | 1.4 | 11.6 |
| All-Star | | 4 | 0 | 18.0 | .684 | .750 | 2.3 | .0 | 8.0 |

==== Playoffs ====
| Year | Team | GP | MPG | FG% | FT% | RPG | APG | PPG |
|---|---|---|---|---|---|---|---|---|
| 1966 | Baltimore | 3 | **32.0** | **.588** | .125 | **9.0** | **1.3** | **13.7** |
| 1968 | Philadelphia | **12** | 18.3 | .585 | .465 | 5.5 | .7 | 8.0 |
| 1969 | Philadelphia | 5 | 8.8 | .563 | **.556** | 2.8 | .2 | 4.6 |
| Career | | 20 | 18.0 | .583 | .433 | 5.4 | .7 | 8.0 |

== See also ==
- List of National Basketball Association season field goal percentage leaders
