= Tony Windis =

American basketball player (1933–2024)

Personal information
- Born: January 27, 1933 New York City, New York, U.S.
- Died: May 14, 2024 (aged 91) Laramie, Wyoming, U.S.
- Listed height: 6 ft 1 in (1.85 m)
- Listed weight: 160 lb (73 kg)

Career information
- High school: Commerce (New York City, New York)
- College: Wyoming (1956–1959)
- NBA draft: 1959: 5th round, 32nd overall pick
- Drafted by: Detroit Pistons
- Playing career: 1959–1960
- Position: Point guard
- Number: 10

Career history
- 1959–1960: Detroit Pistons
- Stats at NBA.com
- Stats at Basketball Reference

Anthony John Windis II (January 27, 1933 – May 14, 2024) was an American professional basketball player who played in the National Basketball Association (NBA) for the Detroit Pistons. Windis played college basketball for the Wyoming Cowboys, and ranks second all time in the school's career scoring average with 21.2 ppg. He was selected with the second pick in the fifth round of the 1959 NBA draft. He appeared in nine games for the Pistons in the 1959–60 NBA season and he averaged 4.0 points per game, 5.2 rebounds per game and 3.6 assists per game.

Windis was a native of Long Island, and lived in Rawlins, Wyoming. He died on May 14, 2024, at the age of 91.

== Career statistics ==
Legend
GP	Games played	GS	Games started	MPG	Minutes per game
FG%	Field goal percentage	3P%	3-point field goal percentage	FT%	Free throw percentage
RPG	Rebounds per game	APG	Assists per game	SPG	Steals per game
BPG	Blocks per game	PPG	Points per game	**Bold**	Career high

=== NBA ===
==== Regular season ====
Year	Team	GP	MPG	FG%	FT%	RPG	APG	PPG
1959–60	Detroit	9	21.4	.267	.667	5.2	3.6	4.0
