= 1959 NBA draft =

Basketball player selection

General information
- Sport: Basketball
- Date: March 31, 1959
- Location: Cincinnati, Ohio

Overview
- 85 total selections in 14 rounds
- League: NBA
- Teams: 8
- Territorial picks: Wilt Chamberlain, Philadelphia Warriors; Bob Ferry, St. Louis Hawks
- First selection: Bob Boozer, Cincinnati Royals
- Hall of Famers: 3: C Wilt Chamberlain; F Bailey Howell; G Dick Barnett

The 1959 NBA draft was the 13th annual draft of the National Basketball Association (NBA). The draft was held on March 31, 1959, before the 1959–60 season. In this draft, eight NBA teams took turns selecting amateur U.S. college basketball players. In each round, the teams select in reverse order of their win–loss record in the previous season. The draft consisted of 14 rounds comprising 85 players selected.

== Draft selections and draftee career notes ==
Bob Boozer from Kansas State University was selected first overall by the Cincinnati Royals. Wilt Chamberlain and Bob Ferry were selected before the draft as Philadelphia Warriors' and St. Louis Hawks' territorial picks respectively. Although Chamberlain played at the University of Kansas, outside the territory of any NBA team, he was selected as the Warriors' territorial pick because the Warriors argued that Chamberlain had grown up in Philadelphia and played high school basketball at Overbrook High School in Philadelphia. The NBA agreed with the argument, hence making him the first territorial pick based solely on his pre-college roots. Chamberlain went on to win the Rookie of the Year Award and the Most Valuable Player Award in his first season. Three players from this draft, Wilt Chamberlain, Bailey Howell, and Dick Barnett have been inducted to the Basketball Hall of Fame.

== Key ==
Pos.	G	F	C
Position	Guard	Forward	Center

^	Denotes player who has been inducted to the Naismith Memorial Basketball Hall of Fame
^{+}	Denotes player who has been selected for at least one All-Star Game
^{#}	Denotes player who has never appeared in an NBA regular-season or playoff game
^{~}	Denotes player who has been selected as Rookie of the Year

== Draft ==
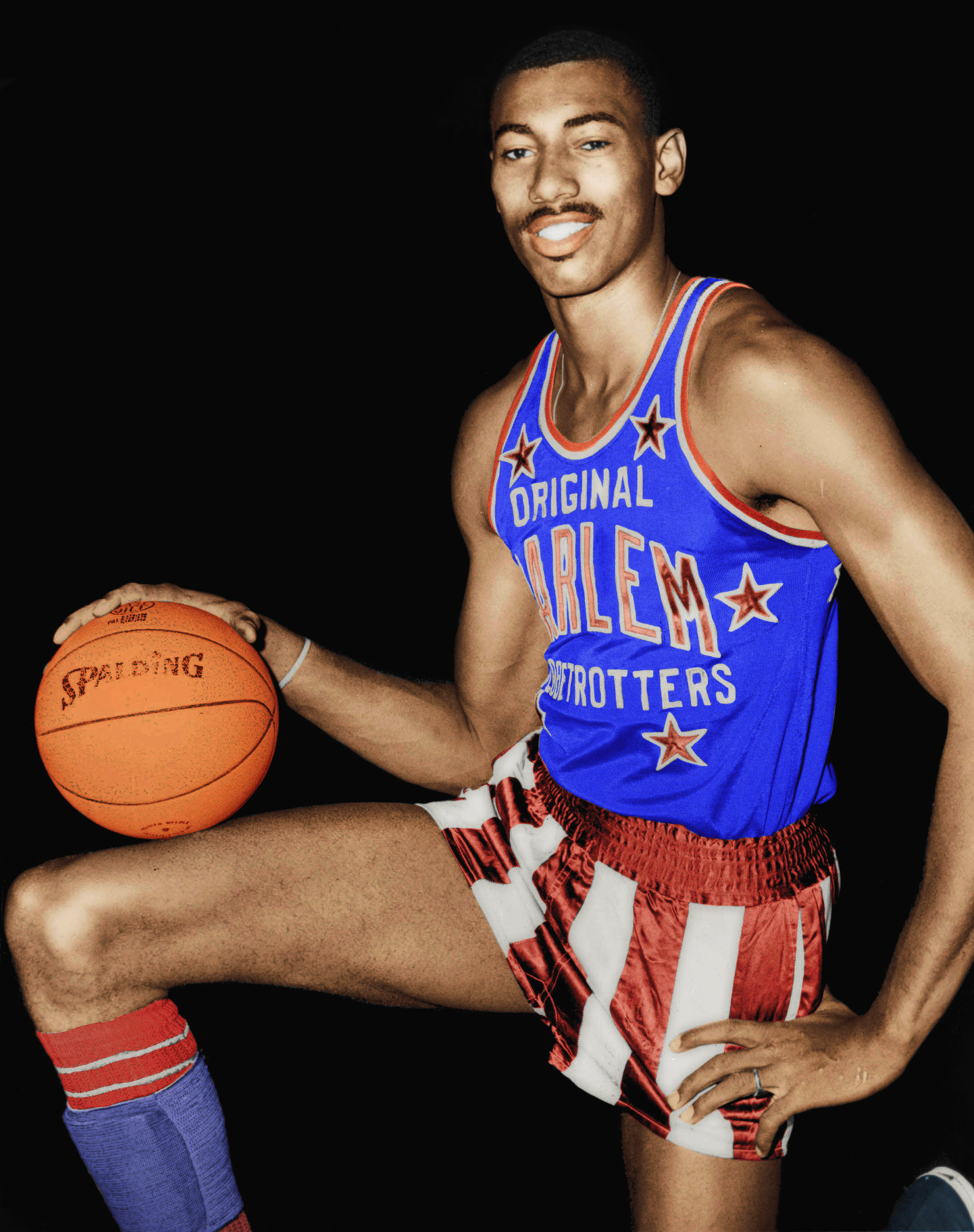
Wilt Chamberlain was selected as the Philadelphia Warriors' territorial pick.

Round	Pick	Player	Position	Nationality	Team	College
T	–	Wilt Chamberlain^^{~}	C	United States	Philadelphia Warriors	Harlem Globetrotters
T	–	Bob Ferry	F/C	United States	St. Louis Hawks	Saint Louis
1	1	Bob Boozer+	F	United States	Cincinnati Royals	Kansas State
1	2	Bailey Howell^	F	United States	Detroit Pistons	Mississippi State
1	3	Tom Hawkins	F	United States	Minneapolis Lakers	Notre Dame
1	4	Dick Barnett^	G/F	United States	Syracuse Nationals	Tennessee State
1	5	Johnny Green^{+}	F/C	United States	New York Knicks	Michigan State
1	6	John Richter	F	United States	Boston Celtics	NC State
2	7	Tom Robitaille^{#}	F/C	United States	Detroit Pistons (from Cincinnati)^{[a]}	Rice
2	8	Don Goldstein^{#}	F	United States	Detroit Pistons	Louisville
2	9	Joe Ruklick	F/C	United States	Philadelphia Warriors	Northwestern
2	10	Rudy LaRusso^{+}	F/C	United States	Minneapolis Lakers	Dartmouth
2	11	Bumper Tormohlen	F/C	United States	Syracuse Nationals	Tennessee
2	12	Al Seiden^{#}	G	United States	St. Louis Hawks (from New York)^{[b]}	St. John's
2	13	Cal Ramsey	F	United States	St. Louis Hawks	NYU
2	14	Gene Guarilia	F	United States	Boston Celtics	George Washington
3	15	Mike Mendenhall^{#}	G	United States	Cincinnati Royals	Cincinnati
3	16	Gary Alcorn	C	United States	Detroit Pistons	Fresno State
3	17	Jim Hockaday^{#}	F	United States	Philadelphia Warriors	Memphis
3	18	Bobby Smith	G	United States	Minneapolis Lakers	West Virginia
3	19	Jon Cincebox	F	United States	Syracuse Nationals	Syracuse
3	20	Bob Anderegg	G/F	United States	New York Knicks	Michigan State
3	21	Hank Stein^{#}	G	United States	St. Louis Hawks	Xavier
3	22	Ralph Crosthwaite^{#}	C	United States	Boston Celtics	Western Kentucky
4	23	Leo Byrd^{#}	G	United States	Cincinnati Royals	Marshall
4	24	George Lee	G/F	United States	Detroit Pistons	Michigan
4	25	Ron Stevenson	F	United States	Philadelphia Warriors	TCU
4	26	Wilson Eison	F	United States	Minneapolis Lakers	Purdue
4	27	Paul Neumann	G	United States	Syracuse Nationals	Stanford
4	28	Johnny Cox	G	United States	New York Knicks	Kentucky
4	29	Lee Harman	G	United States	St. Louis Hawks	Oregon State
4	30	Ed Kazakavich	F	United States	Boston Celtics	Scranton
5	31	Harry Kirchner	G/F	United States	Detroit Pistons	TCU
5	32	Tony Windis	G	United States	Detroit Pistons	Wyoming
5	37	Nick Mantis	G	United States	St. Louis Hawks	Northwestern
8	56	Dave Gunther	F	United States	Philadelphia Warriors	Iowa
8	58	Walt Torrence^{#}	G	United States	New York Knicks	UCLA
8	59	Willie Merriweather	F	United States	St. Louis Hawks	Purdue
11	77	John Barnhill	G	United States	St. Louis Hawks	Tennessee State
14	83	Jack Israel	G/F	United States	New York Knicks	Missouri State

== Trades ==
- ^{a} Prior to the draft, the Detroit Pistons acquired Archie Dees along with the Cincinnati Royals' second-round pick, which was used to select Tom Robitaille, from the Royals in exchange for Phil Jordon.
- ^{b} Prior to the draft, the St. Louis Hawks acquired the New York Knicks' second-round pick, which was used to select Alan Seiden, from the Knicks in exchange for Frank Selvy.

== Notes ==
1: Wilt Chamberlain was playing for the University of Kansas until May 1958, when he decided to leave college early to play professional basketball. However, the NBA rules prevented college players from playing in the league until their class graduated, therefore Chamberlain wasn't eligible to play in the 1958–59 season. He spent the 1958–59 season playing for the Harlem Globetrotters prior to the 1959 draft.

== See also ==
- List of first overall NBA draft picks
