= 1958–59 NCAA University Division men's basketball rankings =

- Season: 1958–59
- NCAA Tournament: 1959
- Preseason No. 1: Cincinnati
- NCAA Tournament Champions: California
NCAA University Division men's basketball rankings


The 1958–59 NCAA men's basketball rankings was made up of two human polls, the AP Poll and the Coaches Poll.

== Legend ==
	Increase in ranking
	Decrease in ranking
	New to rankings from previous week
Italics	Number of first place votes
(#–#)	Win–loss record
т	Tied with team above or below also with this symbol

== AP Poll ==
	Week 1 Dec. 9	Week 2 Dec. 16	Week 3 Dec. 23	Week 4 Dec. 30	Week 5 Jan. 6	Week 6 Jan. 13	Week 7 Jan. 20	Week 8 Jan. 27	Week 9 Feb. 3	Week 10 Feb. 10	Week 11 Feb. 17	Week 12 Feb. 24	Week 13 Mar. 2	Final Mar. 9	
1.	Cincinnati (2–0)	Cincinnati (3–0)	Kentucky (8–0)	Kentucky (8–0)	Kentucky (11–0)	NC State (11–1)	Kentucky (14–1)	Kentucky (14–1)	Kentucky (17–1)	Kentucky (18–1)	North Carolina (16–1)	Kentucky (21–2)	Kentucky (23–2)	Kansas State (24–1)	1.
2.	Kentucky (2–0)	Kentucky (5–0)	Cincinnati (5–0)	Cincinnati (5–0)	NC State (9–1)	Kentucky (12–1)	North Carolina (10–1)	North Carolina (10–1)	North Carolina (12–1)	North Carolina (14–1)	Auburn (18–0)	Kansas State (21–1)	Kansas State (22–1)	Kentucky (23–2)	2.
3.	Kansas State (2–0)	Kansas State (4–0)	North Carolina (5–0)	Kansas State (7–1)	North Carolina (8–1)	North Carolina (9–1)	Kansas State (13–1)	Kansas State (13–1)	Kansas State (15–1)	Kansas State (17–1)	Kentucky (19–2)	North Carolina (17–2)	Cincinnati (21–2)	Mississippi State (24–1)	3.
4.	West Virginia (3–0)	NC State (4–0)	Kansas State (6–1)	North Carolina (5–0)	Kansas State (9–1)	Kansas State (11–1)	NC State (12–2)	Auburn (12–0)	Auburn (14–0)	Auburn (16–0)	Kansas State (19–1)	Cincinnati (18–2)	Mississippi State (24–1)	Bradley (23–3)	4.
5.	NC State (3–0)	Tennessee (4–0)	West Virginia (7–2)	NC State (6–1)	Michigan State (7–1)	Auburn (10–0)	Auburn (11–0)	Cincinnati (11–2)	Cincinnati (13–2)	Cincinnati (16–2)	Mississippi State (20–1)	Mississippi State (22–1)	North Carolina (18–3)	Cincinnati (23–3)	5.
6.	Tennessee (3–0)	Northwestern (3–0)	NC State (6–1)	Northwestern (6–1)	Auburn (8–0)	Cincinnati (8–2)	Cincinnati (10–2)	NC State (12–2)	NC State (14–2)	NC State (16–2)	Cincinnati (16–2)	Auburn (19–1)	Michigan State (16–3)	NC State (22–4)	6.
7.	Kansas (2–0)	West Virginia (5–1)	Mississippi State (7–0)	Michigan State (4–0)	Cincinnati (6–2)	Bradley (9–1)	St. John's (11–1)	St. John's (12–1)	Michigan State (11–2)	Bradley (17–2)	NC State (18–2)	NC State (19–3)	Auburn (20–2)	Michigan State (18–3)	7.
8.	Mississippi State (3–0)	Mississippi State (5–0)	Auburn (5–0)	Mississippi State (7–0)	Northwestern (8–1)	Michigan State (8–2)	Michigan State (8–2)	Michigan State (10–2)	Bradley (14–2)	Saint Louis (12–4)	Saint Louis (14–5)	Michigan State (15–3)	West Virginia (25–4)	Auburn (20–2)	8.
9.	Saint Louis (2–0)	Xavier (4–0)	Michigan State (4–0)	Auburn (6–0)	Bradley (8–0)	St. John's (10–1)	Bradley (11–2)	Bradley (11–2)	Saint Louis (12–4)	West Virginia (18–3)	Michigan State (13–3)	Bradley (19–3)	Bradley (21–3)	North Carolina (20–4)	9.
10.	Northwestern (2–0)	North Carolina (2–0)	Xavier (5–0)	Bradley (7–0)	St. John's (9–1)	West Virginia (12–3)	West Virginia (13–3)	West Virginia (14–3)	West Virginia (16–3)	Mississippi State (18–1)	Bradley (17–3)	West Virginia (22–4)	NC State (19–4)	West Virginia (25–4)	10.
11.	Notre Dame (1–0)	Bradley (2–0) т	Tennessee (5–1)	West Virginia (7–3)	West Virginia (9–3)	Northwestern (9–2)	Mississippi State (13–1)	Mississippi State (18–1)	Mississippi State (18–1)	Marquette (17–1)	West Virginia (19–4)	Saint Louis (14–6)	California (20–4)	California (21–4)	11.
12.	Auburn (2–0)	Michigan State (4–0) т	Northwestern (4–1)	Saint Joseph's (8–1)	Mississippi State (10–1)	Mississippi State (11–1)	Marquette (13–1)	Marquette (13–1)	Marquette (14–1)	Michigan State (12–3)	Seattle (16–5)	California (17–4)	Saint Louis (15–6)	Saint Louis (17–7)	12.
13.	North Carolina (2–0)	Auburn (2–0)	Bradley (5–0)	St. John's (7–1)	Oklahoma City (8–1)	Marquette (12–1)	St. Bonaventure (9–0)	Seattle (12–3)	Oklahoma City (15–2)	Seattle (15–3)	Marquette (17–3)	Marquette (18–3)	Marquette (21–3)	Seattle (22–6)	13.
14.	Saint Mary's (2–0)	Saint Joseph's (4–0)	California (5–1)	Tennessee (6–1)	Saint Louis (5–3)	St. Bonaventure (7–0)	Saint Louis (7–4)	Oklahoma City (12–2)	Seattle (15–3)	Oklahoma City (16–4)	St. Bonaventure (17–3)	TCU (18–4)	Oklahoma City (20–5)	Saint Joseph's (22–3)	14.
15.	Michigan State (1–0)	California (3–1)	Villanova (6–0)	Marquette (9–1)	Marquette (10–1)	Saint Louis (7–3)	Oklahoma City (11–2)	Saint Louis (9–4)	St. John's (12–3)	Indiana (9–6)	California (15–4)	Oklahoma City (19–5)	TCU (18–5)	Saint Mary's (19–6)	15.
16.	Xavier (2–0)	Seattle (4–0)	Saint Louis (3–2)	Saint Louis (3–3)	Seattle (8–2)	Seattle (9–3)	Seattle (11–3)	St. Bonaventure (9–1)	Utah (13–4)	TCU (14–4)	TCU (16–4)	Seattle (17–5)	Utah (19–5)	TCU (19–5)	16.
17.	Marquette (2–0)	Saint Louis (2–1)	Marquette (7–1)	Oklahoma City (7–1)	Tennessee (7–2)	Oklahoma City (10–1)	Portland (12–2)	Louisville (9–8)	TCU (12–4)	Utah (15–4)	Utah (16–4)	St. John's (14–5)	Saint Mary's (18–4)	Oklahoma City (20–5)	17.
18.	SMU (1–1)	Pittsburgh (3–1)	Memphis State (5–0)	Purdue (7–1)	Villanova (7–0)	Portland (10–2)	Northwestern (9–3)	Illinois (8–4)	St. Bonaventure (11–1)	California (13–4)	Oklahoma City (17–5)	St. Bonaventure (17–2)	St. John's (15–6)	Utah (21–5)	18.
19.	Indiana (4–1)	UCLA (1–2)	Washington (5–2)	TCU (7–1)	Texas A&M (9–1)	Indiana (5–5)	Villanova (10–1)	TCU (11–4)	California (11–4)	St. John's (13–3)	Indiana (10–7)	Portland (17–7)	St. Bonaventure (18–2)	St. Bonaventure (20–2)	19.
20.	St. John's (1–0) т Oklahoma State (1–0) т	SMU (3–2)	Dayton (4–0)	California (6–2)	Illinois (6–2)	California (9–3)	Utah (11–4)	California (10–4)	Saint Joseph's (12–3)	Purdue (11–4)	Purdue (12–5)	St. Mary's (17–4)	Saint Joseph's (20–3)	Marquette (22–4)	20.
	Week 1 Dec. 9	Week 2 Dec. 16	Week 3 Dec. 23	Week 4 Dec. 30	Week 5 Jan. 6	Week 6 Jan. 13	Week 7 Jan. 20	Week 8 Jan. 27	Week 9 Feb. 3	Week 10 Feb. 10	Week 11 Feb. 17	Week 12 Feb. 24	Week 13 Mar. 2	Final Mar. 9	
		Dropped: Kansas (2–3); Notre Dame; Saint Mary's; Marquette; Indiana (4–1); St. John's; Oklahoma State	Dropped: Saint Joseph's (6–1); Seattle; Pittsburgh; UCLA; SMU	Dropped: Xavier (6–2); Villanova; Memphis State; Washington (6–3); Dayton	Dropped: Saint Joseph's; Purdue (7–3); TCU (8–2); California (7–3)	Dropped: Tennessee; Villanova; Texas A&M; Illinois	Dropped: Indiana; California (10–4)	Dropped: Portland; Northwestern (10–4); Villanova; Utah (12–4)	Dropped: Louisville; Illinois	Dropped: St. Bonaventure (13–1); Saint Joseph's	Dropped: St. John's (13–5)	Dropped: Utah (17–5); Indiana; Purdue	Dropped: Seattle; Portland	Dropped: St. John's (16–6)	

== UPI Poll ==
	Preseason	Week 1 Dec. 9	Week 2 Dec. 16	Week 3 Dec. 23	Week 4 Dec. 30	Week 5 Jan. 6	Week 6 Jan. 13	Week 7 Jan. 20	Week 8 Jan. 27	Week 9 Feb. 3	Week 10 Feb. 10	Week 11 Feb. 17	Week 12 Feb. 24	Week 13 Mar. 2	Final Mar. 9	
1.	Cincinnati	Cincinnati (2–0)	Cincinnati (3–0)	Cincinnati (5–0)	Cincinnati (5–0)	Kentucky (11–0)	Kentucky (12–1)	Kentucky (14–1)	Kentucky (14–1)	Kentucky (17–1)	Kentucky (18–1)	North Carolina (16–1)	Kentucky (21–2)	Kansas State (22–1)	Kansas State (24–1)	1.
2.	Kansas State	Kansas State (2–0)	Kansas State (4–0)	Kentucky (8–0)	Kentucky (8–0)	NC State (9–1)	NC State (11–1)	North Carolina (10–1)	North Carolina (10–1)	North Carolina (12–1)	North Carolina (14–1)	Kansas State (19–1)	Kansas State (21–1)	Kentucky (23–2)	Kentucky (23–2)	2.
3.	Notre Dame	Kentucky (2–0)	Kentucky (5–0)	Kansas State (6–1)	Kansas State (7–1)	Kansas State (9–1)	Kansas State (11–1)	Kansas State (13–1)	Kansas State (13–1)	Kansas State (15–1)	Kansas State (17–1)	Kentucky (19–2)	Cincinnati (18–2)	Cincinnati (21–2)	Michigan State (18–3)	3.
4.	Kentucky	Michigan State (1–0)	NC State (4–0)	Michigan State (4–0)	Michigan State (4–0)	North Carolina (8–1)	North Carolina (9–1)	NC State (12–2)	NC State (12–2)	Cincinnati (13–2)	Cincinnati (16–2)	Cincinnati (16–2)	North Carolina (17–2)	Michigan State (16–3)	Cincinnati (23–3)	4.
5.	Michigan State	Notre Dame (1–0)	Northwestern (3–0)	North Carolina (5–0)	North Carolina (5–0)	Michigan State (7–1)	Cincinnati (8–2)	Cincinnati (10–2)	Cincinnati (11–2)	NC State (14–2)	NC State (16–2)	NC State (18–2)	NC State (19–3)	North Carolina (18–3)	NC State (22–4)	5.
6.	Washington	NC State (3–0)	Michigan State (2–0)	NC State (6–1)	NC State (6–1)	Cincinnati (6–2)	Michigan State (8–2)	Auburn (11–0)	Auburn (12–0)	Michigan State (11–2)	Auburn (16–0)	Auburn (18–0)	Michigan State (15–3)	Mississippi State (24–1)	Mississippi State (24–1) т	6.
7.	West Virginia	West Virginia (3–0) т	West Virginia (5–1)	West Virginia (7–2)	Northwestern (6–1)	Northwestern (8–1)	Auburn (10–0)	St. John's (11–1) т	Michigan State (10–2)	Auburn (14–0)	Michigan State (12–3)	Michigan State (13–3)	Mississippi State (22–1)	NC State (19–4)	North Carolina (20–4) т	7.
8.	Xavier	Northwestern (2–0) т	Xavier (4–0)	Xavier (5–0)	Bradley (7–0)	Bradley (8–0)	Bradley (9–1)	Michigan State (8–2) т	St. John's (12–1)	Bradley (14–2)	Bradley (17–2)	Saint Louis (14–5)	Auburn (19–1)	California (20–4)	Bradley (23–3)	8.
9.	Oklahoma State	Saint Louis (2–0)	Saint Joseph's (4–0)	Auburn (5–0)	TCU (7–1)	Auburn (8–0)	Northwestern (9–2)	Bradley (11–2)	Bradley (11–2)	Saint Louis (12–4)	Saint Louis (12–4)	California (15–4)	California (17–4)	Bradley (21–3)	California (21–4)	9.
10.	St. John's	St. John's (1–0)	TCU (4–1)	Northwestern (4–1) т	Auburn (6–0)	St. John's (9–1)	St. John's (10–1)	West Virginia (13–3)	West Virginia (14–3)	West Virginia (16–3)	West Virginia (18–3)	Mississippi State (20–1)	Bradley (19–3)	Auburn (20–2)	Auburn (20–2)	10.
11.	Maryland	Saint Mary's (2–0)	Indiana (4–1)	California (5–1) т	Purdue (7–1)	West Virginia (9–3)	TCU (10–2)	TCU (11–3)	Saint Louis (9–4)	St. John's (12–3)	Marquette (17–1)	TCU (16–4)	TCU (18–4)	West Virginia (25–4)	West Virginia (25–4)	11.
12.	NC State	Kansas (2–0)	Tennessee (4–0)	Bradley (5–0)	St. John's (7–1)	Texas A&M (9–1)	West Virginia (12–3)	Mississippi State (13–1)	Marquette (13–1)	California (11–4)	California (13–4)	Bradley (17–3)	Saint Louis (14–6)	Saint Louis (15–6)	TCU (19–5)	12.
13.	Northwestern	Xavier (2–0) т	Utah (4–1)	TCU (5–1)	Saint Joseph's (8–1)	TCU (8–2)	St. Bonaventure (7–0)	Marquette (13–1) т	Mississippi State (18–1) т	Marquette (14–1)	Utah (15–4)	Utah (16–4)	West Virginia (22–4)	TCU (18–5)	Saint Louis (17–7)	13.
14.	North Carolina	Utah (2–0) т	North Carolina (2–0) т	Mississippi State (7–0)	West Virginia (7–3)	California (7–3)	Marquette (12–1)	California (10–4) т	California (10–4) т	Utah (13–4)	TCU (14–4)	West Virginia (19–4)	Utah (17–5)	Utah (19–5)	Utah (21–5)	14.
15.	Saint Joseph's	TCU (2–0)	USC (3–0) т	St. John's (5–1)	California (6–2)	Mississippi State (10–1) т	California (9–3)	Northwestern (9–3)	Utah (12–4) т	Oklahoma City (15–2)	Mississippi State (18–1)	Marquette (17–3)	Marquette (18–3)	Marquette (21–3)	Marquette (22–4)	15.
16.	Saint Louis	Tennessee (3–0)	Bradley (4–0)	Purdue (5–1)	Mississippi State (7–0)	Purdue (7–3) т	Saint Louis (7–3)	St. Bonaventure (9–0) т	Northwestern (10–4)	TCU (12–4)	Indiana (9–6) т	Louisville (13–9) т	Maryland (8–12)	Saint Mary's (18–4)	Tennessee A&I State (27–1)	16.
17.	Mississippi State	Mississippi State (3–0)	Mississippi State (5–0)	St. Bonaventure (4–0)	Saint Louis (3–3)	St. Bonaventure (6–0)	Mississippi State (11–1)	Saint Louis (7–4) т	TCU (11–4) т	Mississippi State (18–1)	Memphis State (12–5) т	St. John's (13–5) т	Navy (14–5)	St. John's (15–6)	St. John's (16–6)	17.
18.	Purdue	Oklahoma State (1–0)	UCLA (1–2)	Washington (5–2) т	Xavier (6–2)	Marquette (10–1)	Indiana (5–5)	Utah (11–4)	UCLA (10–5) т	Memphis State (12–4)	Tennessee A&I State т	St. Bonaventure (17–3)	St. Bonaventure (17–2)	Oklahoma City (20–5) т	Saint Mary's (19–6) т	18.
19.	Louisville	North Carolina (2–0) т	Purdue (3–1)	Utah (4–2) т	Marquette (9–1)	Oklahoma City (8–1) т	Utah (9–4) т	Illinois (8–3) т	Utah State (12–4)	Northwestern (10–5)	Seattle (15–3) т	Oklahoma City (17–5) т	Louisville (14–10)	St. Bonaventure (18–2) т	Navy (16–5) т	19.
20.	Iowa	Texas Tech (3–0)	Kansas (2–3)	Saint Joseph's (6–2)	Washington (6–3)	Utah State (9–3) т	Vanderbilt (7–5) т	Michigan (9–2) т	Oklahoma City (12–2)	UCLA (10–5)	Oklahoma City (16–4) т Notre Dame (9–10) т St. Bonaventure (13–1) т	Saint Mary's (14–4) т	Saint Mary's (17–4)	Louisville (16–10) т	Saint Joseph's (22–3) т St. Bonaventure (20–2) т	20.
	Preseason	Week 1 Dec. 9	Week 2 Dec. 16	Week 3 Dec. 23	Week 4 Dec. 30	Week 5 Jan. 6	Week 6 Jan. 13	Week 7 Jan. 20	Week 8 Jan. 27	Week 9 Feb. 3	Week 10 Feb. 10	Week 11 Feb. 17	Week 12 Feb. 24	Week 13 Mar. 2	Final Mar. 9	
		Dropped: Washington; Maryland; Saint Joseph's; Purdue; Louisville; Iowa	Dropped: Notre Dame; Saint Louis; St. John's; Saint Mary's; Oklahoma State; Texas Tech	Dropped: Indiana; Tennessee; USC; UCLA; Kansas	Dropped: St. Bonaventure; Utah	Dropped: Saint Joseph's; Saint Louis; Xavier; Washington	Dropped: Texas A&M; Purdue; Oklahoma City; Utah State	Dropped: Indiana; Vanderbilt	Dropped: St. Bonaventure; Illinois; Michigan	Dropped: Utah State	Dropped: St. John's; Northwestern; UCLA	Dropped: Indiana; Memphis State; Tennessee A&I State; Seattle; Notre Dame	Dropped: St. John's; Oklahoma City	Dropped: Maryland; Navy	Dropped: Oklahoma City; Louisville	
