= 1958–59 California Golden Bears men's basketball team =

American college basketball season

1958–59 California Golden Bears men's basketball

NCAA tournament National champions PCC champions

National Championship Game, W 71–70 vs. West Virginia
- Conference: Pacific Coast Conference

Ranking
- Coaches: No. 9
- AP: No. 11
- Record: 25–4 (14–2 PCC)
- Head coach: Pete Newell (5th season)
- Assistant coach: Rene Herrerias
- Home arena: Men's Gym

1958–59 Pacific Coast Conference men's basketball standings
	Conf.				Overall
Team	W		L	PCT	W		L	PCT
No. 11 California	14	–	2	.875	25	–	4	.862
Washington	11	–	5	.688	18	–	8	.692
UCLA	10	–	6	.625	16	–	9	.640
Stanford	10	–	6	.625	16	–	9	.640
USC	8	–	8	.500	15	–	11	.577
Oregon State	7	–	7	.500	13	–	13	.500
Idaho	6	–	10	.375	11	–	15	.423
Oregon	3	–	13	.188	9	–	16	.360
Washington State	3	–	13	.188	10	–	16	.385
Rankings from AP Poll

The 1958–59 California Golden Bears men's basketball team represented the University of California, Berkeley in NCAA University Division basketball competition. Led by fifth-year head coach Pete Newell, the Golden Bears won their only national championship.

== Season summary ==
Cal was not a team that thrilled many people beyond its own fans. One writer described the Bears as "just a bunch of guys named Joe." However, Cal was coached by one of the greats, Pete Newell, and his team-oriented, defensive style won the national championship as the Bears beat two teams in the Final Four that featured two of the best guards in history, Cincinnati (Oscar Robertson) and West Virginia (Jerry West).

== Roster ==
1958–59 California Golden Bears men's basketball team
Players
Coaches

Pos.	#	Name	Height	Weight	Year	Hometown
G		Al Buch (C)	6 ft 2 in (1.88 m)	—	Sr	North Hollywood, California
F	34	Bob Dalton	6 ft 3 in (1.91 m)	—	Sr	San Leandro, California
		Dick Doughty	6 ft 8 in (2.03 m)	—	Jr	Oakland, California
G		Denny Fitzpatrick	6 ft 0 in (1.83 m)	—	Sr	Costa Mesa, California
F		Tandy Gillis	6 ft 6 in (1.98 m)	—	Jr	Long Beach, California
F	33	Jack Grout	6 ft 5 in (1.96 m)	—	Sr	Visalia, California
C	40	Darrall Imhoff	6 ft 10 in (2.08 m)	—	Jr	Alhambra, California
		Jim Langley	6 ft 3 in (1.91 m)	—		Salinas, California
		Jerry Mann	6 ft 2 in (1.88 m)	—		San Francisco, California
F	42	Bill McClintock	6 ft 4 in (1.93 m)	—	So	Milwaukee, Wisconsin
G		Earl Shultz	6 ft 4 in (1.93 m)	—	So	South Gate, California
		Bernie Simpson	6 ft 0 in (1.83 m)	—		Omaha, Nebraska

Head coach

Pete Newell (Loyola Marymount)

Assistant coach(es)

- Rene Herrerias (San Francisco)

Legend

- (C) Team captain
- (S) Suspended
- (I) Ineligible
- (W) Walk-on
- Injured
- Current redshirt

Roster
Last update: 19 April 2018

== Schedule and results ==
Date time, TV	Rank^{#}	Opponent^{#}	Result	Record	Site (attendance) city, state
Regular Season
December 3, 1958*		San Jose State	W 60–36	1–0	Men's Gym; Berkeley, CA
December 6, 1958*		San Francisco	W 50–43	2–0	Men's Gym; Berkeley, CA
December 9, 1958*		No. 14 Saint Mary's	W 57–55	3–0	Men's Gym; Berkeley, CA
December 12, 1958*		No. 3 Kansas State	L 65–68	3–1	Men's Gym; Berkeley, CA
December 19, 1958*	No. 15	at Iowa	W 71–52	4–1	Iowa Field House; Iowa City, IA
December 20, 1958*	No. 15	vs. Wisconsin	W 68–53	5–1	Iowa Field House; Iowa City, IA
December 23, 1958*	No. 14	at No. 16 Saint Louis	L 43–55	5–2	Kiel Auditorium; St. Louis, MO
December 27, 1958	No. 14	Arizona	W 90–46	6–2	Men's Gym; Berkeley, CA
January 2, 1959	No. 20	at Washington	W 54–43	7–2 (1–0)	Hec Edmundson Pavilion; Seattle, WA
January 3, 1959	No. 20	at Oregon	L 57–59	7–3 (1–1)	McArthur Court; Eugene, OR
January 9, 1959		Washington	W 55–44	8–3 (2–1)	Men's Gym; Berkeley, CA
January 10, 1959		Idaho	W 64–39	9–3 (3–1)	Men's Gym; Berkeley, CA
January 16, 1959	No. 20	at Stanford	L 53–56	9–4 (3–2)	Stanford Pavilion; Stanford, CA
January 17, 1959		Stanford	W 67–46	10–4 (4–2)	Men's Gym; Berkeley, CA
January 31, 1959*	No. 20	at Santa Clara	W 66–55	11–4	San Jose Civic Auditorium; San Jose, CA
February 6, 1959	No. 19	at UCLA	W 60–58	12–4 (5–2)	Pan-Pacific Auditorium; Los Angeles, CA
February 7, 1959	No. 19	at USC	W 82–55	13–4 (6–2)	Pan-Pacific Auditorium; Los Angeles, CA
February 13, 1959	No. 18	Oregon	W 83–55	14–4 (7–2)	Men's Gym; Berkeley, CA
February 14, 1959	No. 18	UCLA	W 64–51	15–4 (8–2)	Men's Gym; Berkeley, CA
February 20, 1959	No. 15	at Washington State	W 61–37	16–4 (9–2)	Bohler Gymnasium; Pullman, WA
February 21, 1959	No. 15	at Idaho	W 65–46	17–4 (10–2)	Memorial Gym; Moscow
February 23, 1959	No. 15	at Oregon State	W 57–40	18–4 (11–2)	Oregon State Coliseum; Corvallis
February 27, 1959	No. 12	USC	W 70–64	19–4 (12–2)	Men's Gym; Berkeley, CA
February 28, 1959	No. 12	Washington State	W 65–45	20–4 (13–2)	Men's Gym; Berkeley, CA
March 7, 1959	No. 11	Oregon State	W 55–52	21–4 (14–2)	Men's Gym; Berkeley, CA
NCAA Tournament
March 13, 1959*	No. 11	vs. No. 18 Utah; West Regional semifinals	W 71–53	22–4	Cow Palace; Daly City, CA
March 14, 1959*	No. 11	vs. No. 15 Saint Mary's; West Regional Finals	W 66–46	23–4	Cow Palace; Daly City
March 20, 1959*	No. 11	vs. No. 5 Cincinnati; National semifinals	W 64–58	24–4	Freedom Hall (18,619); Louisville, KY
March 21, 1959*	No. 11	vs. No. 10 West Virginia; National Championship	W 71–70	25–4	Freedom Hall (18,498); Louisville, KY
*Non-conference game. ^{#}Rankings from AP Poll. (#) Tournament seedings in parentheses. All times are in Pacific Time.

== NBA draft ==
Two Golden Bears were selected in the next two NBA drafts.

Year	Round	Pick	Player	NBA club
1959	6	45	Bob Dalton	Syracuse Nationals
1960	1	3	Darrall Imhoff	New York Knicks
