= 1958–59 Kansas State Wildcats men's basketball team =

American college basketball season

1958–59 Kansas State Wildcats men's basketball

NCAA regular season champions Big Eight Champions

NCAA tournament, Elite Eight
- Conference: Big Eight Conference

Ranking
- Coaches: No. 1
- AP: No. 1
- Record: 25–2 (14–0 Big Eight)
- Head coach: Tex Winter (6th season)
- Home arena: Ahearn Field House

1958–59 Big Eight Conference men's basketball standings
	Conf.				Overall
Team	W		L	PCT	W		L	PCT
No. 1 Kansas State	14	–	0	1.000	25	–	2	.926
Oklahoma	9	–	5	.643	15	–	10	.600
Colorado	8	–	6	.571	14	–	10	.583
Kansas	8	–	6	.571	11	–	14	.440
Nebraska	5	–	9	.357	12	–	13	.480
Oklahoma State	5	–	9	.357	11	–	14	.440
Iowa State	4	–	10	.286	9	–	16	.360
Missouri	3	–	11	.214	6	–	19	.240
Rankings from AP Poll

The 1958–59 Kansas State Wildcats men's basketball team represented Kansas State University as a member of the Big 8 Conference during the 1958–59 NCAA University Division men's basketball season. The head coach was Tex Winter, innovator of the Triangle offense and future member of the Basketball Hall of Fame, who was in his sixth year at the helm. The Wildcats finished with a record of 25–2 (14–0 Big 8), the No. 1 ranking in both major polls, but fell short of a second straight Final Four appearance after a loss to Cincinnati in the Midwest Regional final of the NCAA tournament.

The team played its home games at Ahearn Field House in Manhattan, Kansas.

== Roster ==
1958–59 Kansas State Wildcats men's basketball team
Players
Coaches

Pos.	#	Name	Height	Weight	Year	Hometown
F	4	Bill Guthridge	5 ft 10 in (1.78 m)	160 lb (73 kg)	Jr	Parsons, Kansas
F	30	Bob Boozer	6 ft 8 in (2.03 m)	210 lb (95 kg)	Sr	Omaha, Nebraska
F	34	Wally Frank	6 ft 8 in (2.03 m)	220 lb (100 kg)	Jr

Head coach

- Tex Winter

Assistant coach(es)

Legend

- (C) Team captain
- (S) Suspended
- (I) Ineligible
- (W) Walk-on
- Injured
- Current redshirt

Roster

== Schedule and results ==
Date time, TV	Rank^{#}	Opponent^{#}	Result	Record	Site city, state
Non-conference regular season
Dec 1, 1958*		Purdue	W 96–83	1–0	Ahearn Field House; Manhattan, Kansas
Dec 6, 1958*		Indiana	W 82–79 ^{OT}	2–0	Ahearn Field House; Manhattan, Kansas
Dec 12, 1958*	No. 3	at California	W 68–65	3–0	Harmon Gym; Berkeley, California
Dec 13, 1958*	No. 3	at San Francisco	W 53–52	4–0	War Memorial Gymnasium; San Francisco, California
Dec 15, 1958*	No. 3	at BYU	L 68–77	4–1	Smith Fieldhouse; Provo, Utah
Dec 19, 1958*	No. 3	No. 4 NC State	W 69–67	5–1	Ahearn Field House; Manhattan, Kansas
Dec 20, 1958*	No. 3	vs. No. 14 Saint Joseph's	W 68–55	6–1	Palestra; Philadelphia, Pennsylvania
Dec 26, 1958*	No. 4	vs. Missouri; Big Eight Holiday Tournament	W 69–66	7–1	Municipal Auditorium; Kansas City, Missouri
Dec 29, 1958*	No. 4	Oklahoma; Big Eight Holiday Tournament	W 73–59	8–1	Municipal Auditorium; Kansas City, Missouri
Dec 30, 1958*	No. 3	vs. Colorado; Big Eight Holiday Tournament	W 67–66	9–1	Municipal Auditorium; Kansas City, Missouri
Big Eight Regular season
Jan 5, 1959	No. 4	at Iowa State	W 59–56	10–1 (1–0)	Iowa State Armory; Ames, Iowa
Jan 10, 1959	No. 4	Colorado	W 89–58	11–1 (2–0)	Ahearn Field House; Manhattan, Kansas
Jan 12, 1959	No. 4	Oklahoma	W 90–45	12–1 (3–0)	Ahearn Field House; Manhattan, Kansas
Jan 17, 1959	No. 4	at Missouri	W 75–60	13–1 (4–0)	Brewer Fieldhouse; Columbia, Missouri
Jan 26, 1959	No. 3	Iowa State	W 78–55	14–1 (5–0)	Ahearn Field House; Manhattan, Kansas
Feb 2, 1959	No. 3	at Nebraska	W 50–43	15–1 (6–0)	Nebraska Coliseum; Lincoln, Nebraska
Feb 7, 1959	No. 3	at Colorado	W 70–59	16–1 (7–0)	Balch Fieldhouse; Boulder, Colorado
Feb 11, 1959	No. 3	Kansas; Sunflower Showdown	W 82–72	17–1 (8–0)	Ahearn Field House; Manhattan, Kansas
Feb 14, 1959*	No. 3	Oklahoma State	W 60–49	18–1 (9–0)	Ahearn Field House; Manhattan, Kansas
Feb 16, 1959	No. 3	at Oklahoma	W 75–55	19–1 (10–0)	McCasland Field House; Norman, Oklahoma
Feb 21, 1959	No. 4	at Oklahoma State	W 62–50	20–1 (11–0)	Gallagher-Iba Arena; Stillwater, Oklahoma
Feb 27, 1959	No. 4	at Kansas; Sunflower Showdown	W 87–77	21–1 (12–0)	Allen Fieldhouse; Lawrence, Kansas
Mar 7, 1959*	No. 2	Missouri	W 108–69	22–1 (13–0)	Ahearn Field House; Manhattan, Kansas
Mar 9, 1959*	No. 1	Nebraska	W 76–54	24–1 (14–0)	Ahearn Field House; Manhattan, Kansas
NCAA Tournament
Mar 13, 1959*	No. 1	vs. DePaul; Midwest Regional semifinal	W 102–70	25–1	Allen Fieldhouse; Lawrence, Kansas
Mar 14, 1959*	No. 1	vs. No. 5 Cincinnati; Midwest Regional final	L 75–85	25–2	Allen Fieldhouse; Lawrence, Kansas
*Non-conference game. ^{#}Rankings from AP Poll. (#) Tournament seedings in parentheses. MW=Midwest.

== Rankings ==
Ranking movements Legend: ██ Increase in ranking ██ Decrease in ranking
	Week														
Poll	Pre	1	2	3	4	5	6	7	8	9	10	11	12	13	Final
AP	Not released	3	3	4	3	4	4	3	3	3	3	4	2	2	1
Coaches	2	2	2	3	3	3	3	3	3	3	3	2	2	1	1

== Awards and honors ==
- Bob Boozer – Consensus First-team All-American (2x), Big Eight Player of the Year (2x)
- Tex Winter – Big Eight Coach of the Year

== Team players drafted into the NBA ==
Round	Pick	Player	NBA club
1	1	Bob Boozer	Cincinnati Royals
