= 1958–59 Idaho Vandals men's basketball team =

American college basketball season

1958–59 Idaho Vandals men's basketball
- Conference: Pacific Coast Conference
- Record: 11–15 (6–10 PCC)
- Head coach: Harlan Hodges (5th season)
- Assistant coach: Wayne Anderson
- MVP: Whaylon Coleman
- Home arena: Memorial Gymnasium

1958–59 Pacific Coast Conference men's basketball standings
| | Conf. | | | | Overall |
| Team | W | | L | PCT | W | | L | PCT |
|---|---|---|---|---|---|---|---|---|
| No. 11 California | 14 | – | 2 | .875 | 25 | – | 4 | .862 |
| Washington | 11 | – | 5 | .688 | 18 | – | 8 | .692 |
| UCLA | 10 | – | 6 | .625 | 16 | – | 9 | .640 |
| Stanford | 10 | – | 6 | .625 | 16 | – | 9 | .640 |
| USC | 8 | – | 8 | .500 | 15 | – | 11 | .577 |
| Oregon State | 7 | – | 7 | .500 | 13 | – | 13 | .500 |
| Idaho | 6 | – | 10 | .375 | 11 | – | 15 | .423 |
| Oregon | 3 | – | 13 | .188 | 9 | – | 16 | .360 |
| Washington State | 3 | – | 13 | .188 | 10 | – | 16 | .385 |
Rankings from AP Poll

The 1958–59 Idaho Vandals men's basketball team represented the University of Idaho during the 1958–59 NCAA University Division basketball season. Members of the Pacific Coast Conference, the Vandals were led by fifth-year head coach Harlan Hodges and played their home games on campus at Memorial Gymnasium in Moscow, Idaho. The Vandals were 11–15 overall and 6–10 in conference play in the final season of the PCC. The last conference game was a home win in overtime over Oregon, coached by UI alumnus Steve Belko.

Idaho played two home games in southern Idaho on consecutive nights in late December, both losses to Utah State, in Twin Falls and Boise, the latter at the Bronco Gym of Boise Junior College.

A notable player was two-sport star Jim Prestel of Indianapolis, who played eight seasons (1960–1967) in the National Football League (NFL) as a defensive lineman.

After the season, Hodges resigned in late April to become a high school superintendent in Anna, Illinois; he was succeeded by Michigan assistant Dave Strack in June.
