= 1958–59 Iowa State Cyclones men's basketball team =

American college basketball season

1958–59 Iowa State Cyclones men's basketball
- Conference: Big Eight Conference
- Record: 9–16 (4–10 Big Eight)
- Head coach: Bill Strannigan (5th season)
- Home arena: Iowa State Armory

1958–59 Big Eight Conference men's basketball standings
	Conf.				Overall
Team	W		L	PCT	W		L	PCT
No. 1 Kansas State	14	–	0	1.000	25	–	2	.926
Oklahoma	9	–	5	.643	15	–	10	.600
Colorado	8	–	6	.571	14	–	10	.583
Kansas	8	–	6	.571	11	–	14	.440
Nebraska	5	–	9	.357	12	–	13	.480
Oklahoma State	5	–	9	.357	11	–	14	.440
Iowa State	4	–	10	.286	9	–	16	.360
Missouri	3	–	11	.214	6	–	19	.240
Rankings from AP Poll

The 1958–59 Iowa State Cyclones men's basketball team represented Iowa State University during the 1958–59 NCAA University Division men's basketball season. The Cyclones were coached by Bill Strannigan, who was in his fifth and final season with the Cyclones. They played their home games at the Iowa State Armory in Ames, Iowa.

They finished the season 9–16, 4–10 in Big Eight play to finish in seventh place.

== Roster ==
1958–59 Iowa State Cyclones men's basketball team
Players
Coaches

Pos.	#	Name	Height	Weight	Year	Hometown
C		Frank Baber	6 ft 6 in (1.98 m)	—
G		Ronald Baukol (C)	5 ft 10 in (1.78 m)	—	Sr
F		Bud Bergman	6 ft 4 in (1.93 m)	—	Sr
G		Nick Bruno	—	—	So	Staten Island, New York
F		Gary Davis	6 ft 6 in (1.98 m)	—	Sr
F		Ted Ecker	—	—
G		Larry Fie	—	—	Jr	Spencer, Iowa
C		John Krocheski	6 ft 7 in (2.01 m)	—	Sr
F		Maynard Lang	6 ft 3 in (1.91 m)	—
C		Frank Baber	6 ft 6 in (1.98 m)	—
G		Roger Lowe	6 ft 1 in (1.85 m)	—
G		Glen Mente	—	—	So	Wheatland, Iowa
F		John O'Keefe	6 ft 4 in (1.93 m)	—
C		Terry Roberts	—	—	So	Webster City, Iowa
G		Bill Stuart	6 ft 6 in (1.98 m)	—
F		Henry Whitney	6 ft 7 in (2.01 m)	—	So	Brooklyn, New York

Head coach

- Bill Strannigan

Assistant coach(es)

Legend

- (C) Team captain
- (S) Suspended
- (I) Ineligible
- (W) Walk-on
- Injured
- Current redshirt

== Schedule and results ==
Date time, TV	Rank^{#}	Opponent^{#}	Result	Record	Site city, state
Regular season
December 1, 1958*; 7:35 pm		South Dakota State	W 63–56	1–0	Iowa State Armory; Ames, Iowa
December 8, 1958*; 7:35 pm		Minnesota	W 81–75	2–0	Iowa State Armory; Ames, Iowa
December 12, 1958*; 9:30 pm, KTTV (delay)		at USC	L 62–71	2–1	Pan-Pacific Auditorium; Los Angeles
December 13, 1958*; 9:30 pm, KTTV (delay)		at UCLA	L 53–65	2–2	Pan-Pacific Auditorium; Los Angeles
December 15, 1958*; 8:00 pm		at Illinois	L 46–68	2–3	Huff Hall (6,328); Champaign, Illinois
December 19, 1958*; 9:35 pm		Colorado State	W 79–55	3–3	Iowa State Armory; Ames, Iowa
December 20, 1958*; 7:30 pm		vs. Oklahoma City	L 56–63	3–4	Veterans Memorial Auditorium; Des Moines, Iowa
December 26, 1958*; 9:30 pm		vs. Oklahoma; Big Eight Holiday Tournament Quarterfinals	L 65–68	3–5	Municipal Auditorium; Kansas City, Missouri
December 29, 1958*; 2:00 pm		vs. Missouri; Big Eight Holiday Tournament Consolation Semifinals	W 72–70 ^{OT}	4–5	Municipal Auditorium; Kansas City, Missouri
December 30, 1958*; 4:00 pm		vs. Oklahoma State; Big Eight Holiday Tournament Fifth Place	W 64–62	5–5	Municipal Auditorium; Kansas City, Missouri
January 5, 1959; 7:35 pm		No. 3 Kansas State	L 56–59	5–6 (0–1)	Iowa State Armory; Ames, Iowa
January 10, 1959; 7:35 pm		Oklahoma	L 43–56	5–7 (0–2)	Iowa State Armory; Ames, Iowa
January 12, 1959; 7:35 pm		Kansas	L 48–69	5–8 (0–3)	Iowa State Armory; Ames, Iowa
January 17, 1959; 8:05 pm		at Nebraska	L 49–52	5–9 (0–4)	Nebraska Coliseum; Lincoln, Nebraska
January 19, 1959; 9:05 pm		at Colorado	L 64–73	5–10 (0–5)	Balch Fieldhouse; Boulder, Colorado
January 26, 1959; 7:35 pm		at No. 3 Kansas State	L 55–78	5–11 (0–6)	Ahearn Fieldhouse; Manhattan, Kansas
January 31, 1959; 7:35 pm		Oklahoma State	W 48–47	6–11 (1–6)	Iowa State Armory; Ames, Iowa
February 7, 1959; 7:35 pm		Missouri	W 61–53	7–11 (2–6)	Iowa State Armory; Ames, Iowa
February 9, 1959*; 8:15 pm		at Drake; Iowa Big Four	L 57–58	7–12	Veterans Memorial Auditorium; Des Moines, Iowa
February 14, 1959; 7:30 pm		at Oklahoma	L 50–65	7–13 (2–7)	OU Fieldhouse; Norman, Oklahoma
February 16, 1959; 7:30 pm		at Oklahoma State	L 54–59	7–14 (2–8)	Gallagher Hall; Stillwater, Oklahoma
February 21, 1959; 7:35 pm		Colorado	L 63–75	7–15 (2–9)	Iowa State Armory; Ames, Iowa
February 28, 1959; 7:35 pm		Nebraska	W 59–56	8–15 (3–9)	Iowa State Armory; Ames, Iowa
March 3, 1959; 7:30 pm		at Kansas	W 67–62	9–15 (4–9)	Allen Fieldhouse; Lawrence, Kansas
March 9, 1959; 8:00 pm		at Missouri	L 67–68	9–16 (4–10)	Brewer Fieldhouse; Columbia, Missouri
*Non-conference game. ^{#}Rankings from AP poll. (#) Tournament seedings in parentheses. All times are in Central Time.
