= 1958–59 Kansas Jayhawks men's basketball team =

American college basketball season

1958–59 Kansas Jayhawks men's basketball
- Conference: Big Eight Conference
- Record: 11–14 (8–6 Big 8)
- Head coach: Dick Harp (3rd season)
- Assistant coaches: Jack Eskridge (5th season); Jerry Waugh (3rd season)
- Home arena: Allen Fieldhouse

1958–59 Big Eight Conference men's basketball standings
	Conf.				Overall
Team	W		L	PCT	W		L	PCT
No. 1 Kansas State	14	–	0	1.000	25	–	2	.926
Oklahoma	9	–	5	.643	15	–	10	.600
Colorado	8	–	6	.571	14	–	10	.583
Kansas	8	–	6	.571	11	–	14	.440
Nebraska	5	–	9	.357	12	–	13	.480
Oklahoma State	5	–	9	.357	11	–	14	.440
Iowa State	4	–	10	.286	9	–	16	.360
Missouri	3	–	11	.214	6	–	19	.240
Rankings from AP Poll

The 1958–59 Kansas Jayhawks men's basketball team represented the University of Kansas during the 1958–59 college men's basketball season.

== Roster ==
- Ron Loneski
- Bill Bridges
- Al Donaghue
- Bob Billings
- Dee Ketchum
- Bob Hickman
- Monte Johnson
- Jim Hoffman
- Lyn Kindred
- Gary Thompson
- Dick Gisel
- Russ Marcinek
- Doyle Schick

== Schedule ==
Date time, TV	Rank^{#}	Opponent^{#}	Result	Record	Site city, state
December 1*		Rice	W 65–49	1-0	Allen Fieldhouse; Lawrence, KS
December 6*		at Canisius	W 75–54	2-0	Buffalo Memorial Auditorium; Buffalo, NY
December 8*		Denver	L 60–73	2-1	Allen Fieldhouse; Lawrence, KS
December 12*	No. 7	at UCLA	L 61–72	2-2	UCLA Men's Gymnasium; Los Angeles, cA
December 13*	No. 7	at USC	L 55–68	2-3	Pan-Pacific Auditorium; Los Angeles, CA
December 19*		vs. No. 14 Saint Joseph's	L 65–67	2-4	Ahearn Field House; Manhattan, KS
December 20*		No. 4 NC State	L 63–66	2-5	Allen Fieldhouse; Lawrence, KS
December 26		vs. Colorado	L 52–63	2-6	Municipal Auditorium; Kansas City, MO
December 27		vs. Oklahoma State	L 48–59	2-7	Municipal Auditorium; Kansas City, MO
December 30		vs. Missouri; Border War	W 84–73	3-7	Municipal Auditorium; Kansas City, MO
January 5		Oklahoma State	W 58–49	4-7 (1-0)	Allen Fieldhouse; Lawrence, KS
January 10		at Missouri; Border War	W 69–62	5-7 (2-0)	Brewer Fieldhouse; Columbia, MO
January 12		at Iowa State	W 69–48	6-7 (3-0)	The Armory; Ames, IA
January 17		at Oklahoma	L 38–45	6-8 (3-1)	Field House; Norman, OK
January 31		Colorado	L 64–66	6-9 (3-2)	Allen Fieldhouse; Lawrence, KS
February 4		Oklahoma	W 71–44	7-9 (4-2)	Allen Fieldhouse; Lawrence, KS
February 7		at Louisville	L 74–82	7-10	Freedom Hall; Louisville, KY
February 11		at No. 3 Kansas State; Sunflower Showdown	L 72–82	7-11 (4-3)	Ahearn Field House; Manhattan, KS
February 14		at Nebraska	W 63–55	8-11 (5-3)	Nebraska Coliseum; Lincoln, NE
February 16		at Colorado	L 53–65	8-12 (5-4)	Balch Fieldhouse; Boulder, CO
February 21		Nebraska	W 66–50	9-12 (6-4)	Allen Fieldhouse; Lawrence, KS
February 23		Missouri; Border War	W 85–81	10-12 (7-4)	Allen Fieldhouse; Lawrence, KS
February 27		No. 2 Kansas State; Sunflower Showdown	L 77–87	10-13 (7-5)	Allen Fieldhouse; Lawrence, KS
March 3		Iowa State	L 62–67	10-14 (7-6)	Allen Fieldhouse; Lawrence, KS
March 10		at Oklahoma State	W 63–55	11-14 (8-6)	Gallagher-Iba Arena; Stillwater, OK
*Non-conference game. ^{#}Rankings from AP Poll. (#) Tournament seedings in parentheses.
