= 1958–59 Washington State Cougars men's basketball team =

American college basketball season

1958–59 Washington State Cougars men's basketball
- Conference: Pacific Coast Conference
- Record: 10–16 (3–13 PCC)
- Head coach: Marv Harshman (1st season)
- Home arena: Bohler Gymnasium

1958–59 Pacific Coast Conference men's basketball standings
	Conf.				Overall
Team	W		L	PCT	W		L	PCT
No. 11 California	14	–	2	.875	25	–	4	.862
Washington	11	–	5	.688	18	–	8	.692
UCLA	10	–	6	.625	16	–	9	.640
Stanford	10	–	6	.625	16	–	9	.640
USC	8	–	8	.500	15	–	11	.577
Oregon State	7	–	7	.500	13	–	13	.500
Idaho	6	–	10	.375	11	–	15	.423
Oregon	3	–	13	.188	9	–	16	.360
Washington State	3	–	13	.188	10	–	16	.385
Rankings from AP Poll

The 1958–59 Washington State Cougars men's basketball team represented Washington State College for the 1958–59 NCAA college basketball season. Led by first-year head coach Marv Harshman, the Cougars were members of the Pacific Coast Conference and played their home games on campus at Bohler Gymnasium in Pullman, Washington.

The Cougars were 10–16 overall in the regular season and 3–13 in conference play, tied for last in the standings.

Harshman was formerly the head coach at his alma mater, Pacific Lutheran, for thirteen seasons, and he led the Cougars for thirteen years.

The PCC disbanded in the spring and Washington State was an independent for three years, then joined the AAWU, today's Pac-12 Conference.

The school became "Washington State University" in September 1959.
