= Eastern Kentucky Colonels men's basketball =

2025–26 Eastern Kentucky Colonels men's basketball team
- University: Eastern Kentucky University
- Head coach: A.W. Hamilton (8th season)
- Location: Richmond, Kentucky
- Arena: Alumni Coliseum (capacity: 6,500)
- Conference: UAC
- Nickname: Colonels
- Colors: Maroon and white

NCAA Division I tournament appearances
- 1953, 1959, 1965, 1972, 1979, 2005, 2007, 2014

Conference tournament champions
- 1950, 1955, 1979, 2005, 2007, 2014

Conference regular-season champions
- 1953, 1959, 1961, 1965, 1972, 1979, 2024

Conference division champions
- 2015

Uniforms
Home	Away

The Eastern Kentucky Colonels men's basketball team is a college basketball team at Eastern Kentucky University (EKU), located in Richmond, Kentucky, United States. The Colonels are members of the United Athletic Conference since 2026 and previously members of the Atlantic Sun Conference, which they joined in 2021 after having been members of the Ohio Valley Conference since that league's founding in 1948. Home games are played at Alumni Coliseum, located on EKU's campus. The team last played in the NCAA Division I men's basketball tournament in 2014. The Colonels are coached by A.W. Hamilton, who came to EKU in 2018 after previous head coach Dan McHale was fired after 3 seasons.

== Season-by-season records ==
- NOTE: Eastern Kentucky did not field a team 1917–1919 or 1943–44.

Season	W	L	PCT	Conf. record	Postseason
Independent
1909–10	3	3	.500		
1910–11	4	6	.400		
1911–12	3	2	.600		
1912–13	9	3	.750		
1913–14	4	3	.571		
1914–15	0	3	.000		
1915–16	7	1	.875		
1916–17	3	3	.500		
1919–20	3	4	.429		
1920–21	3	6	.333		
1921–22	10	4	.714		
1922–23	9	6	.600		
1923–24	12	7	.632		
1924–25	5	13	.278		
1925–26	1	11	.083		
1926–27	4	13	.235		
1927–28	3	15	.167		
1928–29	2	13	.133		
1929–30	14	8	.636		
1930–31	12	4	.750		
1931–32	13	8	.619		
1932–33	14	4	.778		
1933–34	7	7	.500		
1934–35	8	9	.471		
1935–36	12	10	.545		
1936–37	10	6	.625		
1937–38	12	7	.632		
1938–39	11	5	.688		
1939–40	16	2	.889		
1940–41	10	5	.667		
1941–42	11	5	.688		
1942–43	12	5	.706		
1944–45	20	5	.800		NAIA National Semifinals
1945–46	21	3	.875		NAIA First Round
1946–47	21	4	.840		
1947–48	17	7	.708		
Ohio Valley Conference
1948–49	17	4	.810	7–3	
1949–50	16	6	.728	7–3	
1950–51	18	8	.692	8–3	
1951–52	13	11	.542	10–2	
1952–53	16	9	.640	9–1	NCAA first round
1953–54	7	16	.304	4–6	
1954–55	15	8	.652	6–4	
1955–56	9	16	.360	3–7	
1956–57	6	15	.286	4–6	
1957–58	8	11	.421	3–7	
1958–59	16	6	.727	10–2	NCAA first round
1959–60	14	8	.636	9–3	
1960–61	15	9	.625	9–3	
1961–62	10	6	.625	7–5	
1962–63	9	12	.429	6–6	
1963–64	15	9	.625	9–5	
1964–65	19	6	.760	13–1	NCAA first round
1965–66	16	9	.640	9–5	
1966–67	5	18	.217	2–12	
1967–68	10	14	.417	6–8	
1968–69	13	9	.591	7–7	
1969–70	12	10	.545	8–6	
1970–71	16	8	.667	10–4	
1971–72	15	11	.577	9–5	NCAA first round
1972–73	12	13	.480	7–7	
1973–74	8	15	.348	6–8	
1974–75	7	18	.280	3–11	
1975–76	10	15	.400	6–8	
1976–77	8	16	.333	3–11	
1977–78	15	11	.577	8–6	
1978–79	21	8	.724	9–3	NCAA first round
1979–80	15	12	.556	7–5	
1980–81	10	16	.385	7–7	
1981–82	5	21	.192	3–13	
1982–83	10	17	.370	7–7	
1983–84	11	16	.407	5–9	
1984–85	16	13	.552	9–5	
1985–86	10	18	.357	5–9	
1986–87	19	11	.633	9–5	
1987–88	18	11	.621	10–4	
1988–89	7	22	.341	4–8	
1989–90	13	17	.433	7–5	
1990–91	19	10	.655	9–3	
1991–92	19	14	.576	9–5	
1992–93	15	12	.556	11–5	
1993–94	13	14	.481	9–7	
1994–95	9	19	.321	6–10	
1995–96	13	14	.481	7–9	
1996–97	8	18	.308	6–12	
1997–98	10	17	.370	8–10	
1998–99	3	23	.115	2–16	
1999–2000	6	21	.222	2–16	
2000–01	7	19	.269	1–15	
2001–02	7	20	.259	3–13	
2002–03	11	17	.393	5–11	
2003–04	14	15	.483	8–8	
2004–05	22	9	.710	11–5	NCAA first round
2005–06	14	16	.467	11–9	
2006–07	21	12	.636	13–7	NCAA first round
2007–08	14	16	.467	10–10	
2008–09	18	13	.581	10–8	
2009–10	20	12	.625	11–7	CBI First Round
2010–11	15	16	.484	9–9	
2011–12	16	16	.500	7–9	
2012–13	25	10	.714	12–4	CBI First Round
2013–14	24	10	.706	11-5	NCAA first round
2014–15	21	12	.636	11-5	CIT third round
2015–16	15	16	.484	6-10	
2016–17	12	19	.387	5-11	
2017–18	11	20	.355	5-13	
2018–19	13	18	.419	6-12	
2019–20	16	17	.485	12-6	
2020–21	22	7	.759	15-5	
ASUN Conference
2021–22	13	18	.419	5-11	
2022–23	23	14	.622	12-6	CBI runner-up
Totals	1342	1235	.520		

== Postseason ==
=== NCAA tournament results ===
The Colonels have appeared in eight NCAA Tournaments. Their combined record is 0–8, the second worst record of most losses without a victory in the NCAA tournament (Iona had a win in the NCAA Tournament in 1980 before the NCAA stripped it away due to violation, which means they are "0-15").

Year	Round	Opponent	Result
1953	First Round	Notre Dame	L 57–72
1959	First Round	Louisville	L 63–77
1965	First Round	DePaul	L 52–99
1972	First Round	Florida State	L 81–83
1979	First Round	Tennessee	L 81–97
2005	First Round	Kentucky	L 64–72
2007	First Round	North Carolina	L 65–86
2014	First Round	Kansas	L 69–80

=== NAIA tournament results ===
The Colonels have appeared in two NAIA Tournaments. Their combined record is 2–3.

Year	Round	Opponent	Final score
1945	First Round; Quarterfinals; Semifinals; National 3rd Place Game	Simpson (IA); Central Methodist; Pepperdine; Southern Illinois	W 64–42; W 50–48 ^{OT} L 34–52; L 45–49
1946	First Round	Drury	L 47–51

=== CBI results ===
The Colonels have appeared in two College Basketball Invitational (CBI). Their record is 3–2.

Year	Round	Opponent	Final score
2010	First Round	College of Charleston	L 79–82
2023	First Round; Quarterfinals; Semifinals; Finals	Cleveland State; Indiana State; Southern Utah; Charlotte	W 91–75^{OT} W 89–88^{OT} W 108–106^{OT} L 68–71

=== CIT results ===
The Colonels have appeared in two CollegeInsider.com Postseason Tournament (CIT). Their combined record is 3–2.

Year	Round	Opponent	Final score
2013	First Round; Second Round	Gardner–Webb; Evansville	W 69–62; L 72–86
2015	First Round; Second Round; Quarterfinals	Norfolk State; High Point; UT Martin	W 81–75; W 66–65; L 69–70

== Conference championships ==
The Colonels have won seven conference regular season championships.

Year	Conference	Overall Record	Conference Record	Coach
1953	Ohio Valley	16–9	9–1	Paul S. McBrayer
1959	Ohio Valley	16–6	10–2	Paul S. McBrayer
1961	Ohio Valley	15–9	9–3	Paul S. McBrayer
1965	Ohio Valley	19–6	13–1	James E. Baechtold
1972	Ohio Valley	15–11	9–5	Guy R. Strong
1979	Ohio Valley	21–8	9–3	Ed Byhre
2024	Atlantic Sun	17–12	12–3	A.W. Hamilton

== Notable players ==
- Javontae Hawkins (born 1993), basketball player in the Israeli Basketball Premier League
- Corey Walden, professional basketball player, 2019 Israeli Basketball Premier League MVP
