= 1958–59 UCLA Bruins men's basketball team =

American college basketball season

1958–59 UCLA Bruins men's basketball
- Conference: Pacific Coast Conference
- Record: 16–9 (10–6 PCC)
- Head coach: John Wooden (11th season)
- Assistant coaches: Bill Putnam; Jerry Norman
- Home arena: Pan-Pacific Auditorium

1958–59 Pacific Coast Conference men's basketball standings
	Conf.				Overall
Team	W		L	PCT	W		L	PCT
No. 11 California	14	–	2	.875	25	–	4	.862
Washington	11	–	5	.688	18	–	8	.692
UCLA	10	–	6	.625	16	–	9	.640
Stanford	10	–	6	.625	16	–	9	.640
USC	8	–	8	.500	15	–	11	.577
Oregon State	7	–	7	.500	13	–	13	.500
Idaho	6	–	10	.375	11	–	15	.423
Oregon	3	–	13	.188	9	–	16	.360
Washington State	3	–	13	.188	10	–	16	.385
Rankings from AP Poll

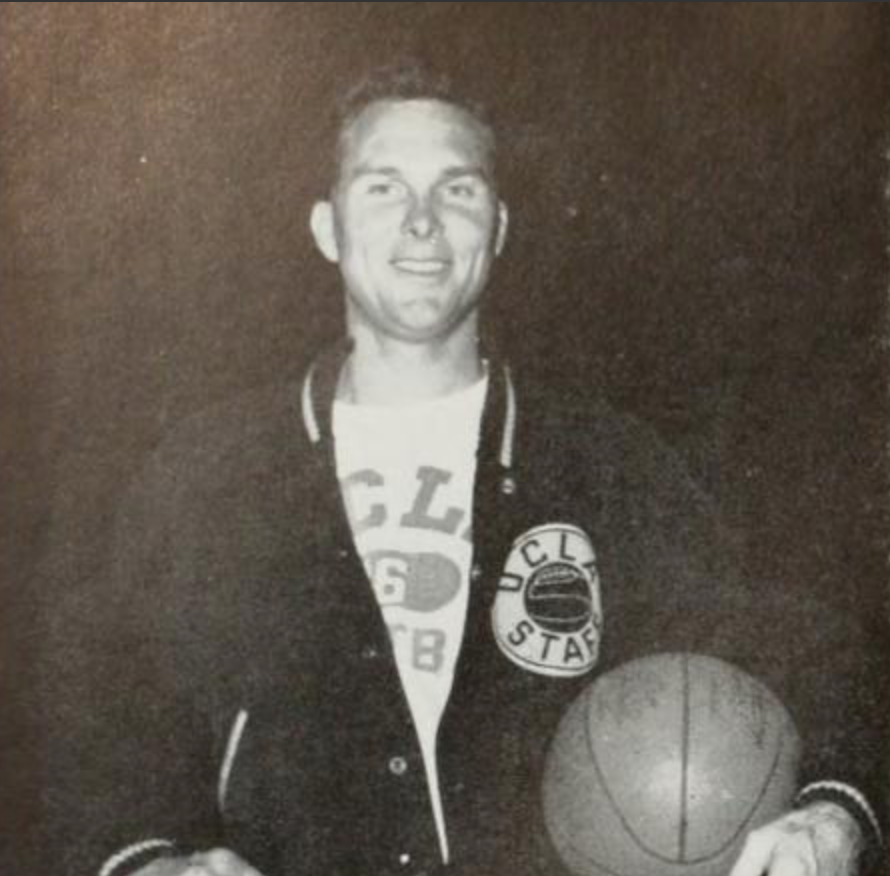
Jerry Norman at this time

The 1958–59 UCLA Bruins men's basketball team represented the University of California, Los Angeles during the 1958–59 NCAA men's basketball season and were members of the Pacific Coast Conference. The Bruins were led by eleventh year head coach John Wooden. They finished the regular season with a record of 16–9 and finished third in the PCC with a record of 10–6.

== Previous season ==
The Bruins finished the regular season with a record of 16–10 and finished third in the PCC with a record of 10–6.

== Roster ==
1958–59 UCLA Bruins men's basketball team
Players
Coaches

Pos.	#	Name	Height	Weight	Year	Hometown
F	52	Bob Archer	6 ft 5 in (1.96 m)	—	Sr
G	23	Cliff Brandon	5 ft 10 in (1.78 m)	—	Jr
G		Denny Crum	6 ft 0 in (1.83 m)	—	Sr	San Fernando, California
F	42	Bob Fisher	6 ft 2 in (1.88 m)	—
G	43	Bill French	6 ft 1 in (1.85 m)	—
F	25	Rafer Johnson	6 ft 3 in (1.91 m)	201 lb (91 kg)	Sr	Hillsboro, Texas
F	33	Warnell Jones	—	—
F	54	Brian Kniff	6 ft 4 in (1.93 m)	—	So
G	45	Denny Miller	6 ft 4 in (1.93 m)	—
C	32	Kent Miller	6 ft 6 in (1.98 m)	—	So
G		Marty Shapiro	6 ft 1 in (1.85 m)	—
G	20	Sonny Skjervheim	6 ft 2 in (1.88 m)	—	So
G	22	Walt Torrence (C)	6 ft 3 in (1.91 m)	—	Sr
F	55	Roland Underhill	6 ft 5 in (1.96 m)	—	Sr
C	35	Ron Wallace	6 ft 5 in (1.96 m)	—

Head coach

John Wooden (Purdue)

Assistant coach(es)

- Bill Putnam (UCLA)
- Jerry Norman (UCLA)

Legend

- (C) Team captain
- (S) Suspended
- (I) Ineligible
- (W) Walk-on
- Injured
- Current redshirt

Roster
Last update: 30 January 2018

== Schedule ==
Date time, TV	Rank^{#}	Opponent^{#}	Result	Record	Site city, state
Regular Season
December 5, 1958*		vs. St. Mary's	L 59–62	0–1	Cow Palace; Daly City, CA
December 6, 1958*		vs. Santa Clara	L 42–56	0–2	Cow Palace; Daly City, CA
December 12, 1958*		No. 7 Kansas	W 72–61	1–2	Pan-Pacific Auditorium; Los Angeles, CA
December 13, 1958*; 7:30 pm, KTTV (delay)		Iowa State	W 65–53	2–2	Pan-Pacific Auditorium; Los Angeles, CA
December 19, 1958*	No. 19	Colorado	W 58–48	3–2	Pan-Pacific Auditorium; Los Angeles, CA
December 20, 1958*	No. 19	Colorado	W 56–54	4–2	Pan-Pacific Auditorium; Los Angeles, CA
December 26, 1958*		Santa Clara	L 47–49	4–3	Pan-Pacific Auditorium; Los Angeles, CA
December 27, 1958*		Denver	W 71–57	5–3	Pan-Pacific Auditorium; Los Angeles, CA
January 2, 1959		at Idaho	W 62–53	6–3 (1–0)	Memorial Gymnasium; Moscow, ID
January 3, 1959		at Washington State	L 54–71	6–4 (1–1)	Bohler Gymnasium; Pullman, WA
January 5, 1959		at Washington	L 63–68	6–5 (1–2)	Hec Edmundson Pavilion; Seattle, WA
January 9, 1959		Washington State	W 68–41	7–5 (2–2)	Pan-Pacific Auditorium; Los Angeles, CA
January 10, 1959		Oregon State	W 73–62	8–5 (3–2)	Pan-Pacific Auditorium; Los Angeles, CA
January 16, 1959		USC	W 57–53	9–5 (4–2)	Pan-Pacific Auditorium; Los Angeles, CA
January 17, 1959		USC	W 65–63	10–5 (5–2)	Pan-Pacific Auditorium; Los Angeles, CA
January 30, 1959*		UC Santa Barbara	W 63–59	11–5	Pan-Pacific Auditorium; Los Angeles, CA
February 6, 1959		No. 19 California	L 58–60	11–6 (5–3)	Pan-Pacific Auditorium; Los Angeles, CA
February 7, 1959		Idaho	L 87–91	11–7 (5–4)	Pan-Pacific Auditorium; Los Angeles, CA
February 13, 1959		at Stanford	L 61–69	11–8 (5–5)	Stanford Pavilion; Stanford, CA
February 14, 1959		at No. 18 California	L 51–64	11–9 (5–6)	Men's Gym; Berkeley, CA
February 20, 1959		Oregon	W 70–53	12–9 (6–6)	Pan-Pacific Auditorium; Los Angeles, CA
February 21, 1959		Stanford	W 64–51	13–9 (7–6)	Pan-Pacific Auditorium; Los Angeles, CA
February 27, 1959		at Oregon State	W 71–59	14–9 (8–6)	Oregon State Coliseum; Corvallis, OR
February 28, 1959		at Oregon	W 69–62	15–9 (9–6)	McArthur Court; Eugene, OR
March 6, 1959		Washington	W 56–55	16–9 (10–6)	Men's Gym; Los Angeles, CA
*Non-conference game. ^{#}Rankings from AP Poll. (#) Tournament seedings in parentheses. All times are in Pacific Time.
