= 1958–59 Washington Huskies men's basketball team =

American college basketball season

1958–59 Washington Huskies men's basketball
- Conference: Pacific Coast Conference
- Record: 18–8 (11–5 PCC)
- Head coach: Tippy Dye (9th season)
- Assistant coach: Joe Cipriano
- Home arena: Hec Edmundson Pavilion

1958–59 Pacific Coast Conference men's basketball standings
	Conf.				Overall
Team	W		L	PCT	W		L	PCT
No. 11 California	14	–	2	.875	25	–	4	.862
Washington	11	–	5	.688	18	–	8	.692
UCLA	10	–	6	.625	16	–	9	.640
Stanford	10	–	6	.625	16	–	9	.640
USC	8	–	8	.500	15	–	11	.577
Oregon State	7	–	7	.500	13	–	13	.500
Idaho	6	–	10	.375	11	–	15	.423
Oregon	3	–	13	.188	9	–	16	.360
Washington State	3	–	13	.188	10	–	16	.385
Rankings from AP Poll

The 1958–59 Washington Huskies men's basketball team represented the University of Washington for the 1958–59 NCAA University Division basketball season. Led by ninth-year head coach Tippy Dye, the Huskies were members of the Pacific Coast Conference and played their home games on campus at Hec Edmundson Pavilion in Seattle, Washington.

The Huskies were 18–8 overall in the regular season and 11–5 in conference play, second in the standings.

Dye departed after the season in June to become athletic director at Wichita State, succeeded a month later by John Grayson, the head coach at Idaho State.
