= NCAA Division I men's basketball tournament all-time team records =

This is a list of NCAA Division I men's basketball tournament all-time records, updated through the 2026 tournament. Schools whose names are italicized are no longer in Division I, and can no longer be included in the tournament. Teams with (*) have had games vacated due to NCAA rules violations. The records do include vacated games.

Conference affiliations reflect those in the 2026–27 season.

| School | Conference | Games | Wins | Losses | Winning pct. |
|---|---|---|---|---|---|
| Abilene Christian | United | 3 | 1 | 2 | .333 |
| Air Force | MW | 4 | 0 | 4 | .000 |
| Akron | MAC | 8 | 0 | 8 | .000 |
| Alabama* | SEC | 60 | 33 | 27 | .550 |
| Alabama A&M | SWAC | 1 | 0 | 1 | .000 |
| Alabama State | SWAC | 6 | 1 | 5 | .167 |
| UAB | American | 27 | 10 | 17 | .370 |
| Albany | America East | 6 | 1 | 5 | .167 |
| Alcorn State | SWAC | 9 | 3 | 6 | .333 |
| American | Patriot | 4 | 0 | 4 | .000 |
| Appalachian State | Sun Belt | 3 | 0 | 3 | .000 |
| Arizona* | Big 12 | 105 | 66 | 39 | .629 |
| Arizona State* | Big 12 | 33 | 15 | 18 | .455 |
| Arkansas | SEC | 91 | 54 | 37 | .593 |
| Arkansas-Pine Bluff | SWAC | 2 | 1 | 1 | .500 |
| Arkansas State | Sun Belt | 1 | 0 | 1 | .000 |
| Auburn | SEC | 37 | 23 | 14 | .622 |
| Austin Peay* | United | 10 | 2 | 8 | .200 |
| Ball State | MAC | 10 | 3 | 7 | .300 |
| Baylor | Big 12 | 42 | 24 | 18 | .571 |
| Belmont | MVC | 9 | 1 | 8 | .111 |
| Binghamton | America East | 1 | 0 | 1 | .000 |
| Boise State | Pac-12 | 10 | 0 | 10 | .000 |
| Boston College | ACC | 41 | 22 | 19 | .537 |
| Boston University | Patriot | 9 | 2 | 7 | .222 |
| Bowling Green | MAC | 6 | 1 | 5 | .167 |
| Bradley | MVC | 20 | 11 | 9 | .550 |
| Bryant | America East | 2 | 0 | 2 | .000 |
| BYU | Big 12 | 53 | 17 | 36 | .321 |
| Brown | Ivy | 2 | 0 | 2 | .000 |
| Bucknell | Patriot | 10 | 2 | 8 | .200 |
| Buffalo | MAC | 6 | 2 | 4 | .333 |
| Butler | Big East | 40 | 24 | 16 | .600 |
| California* | ACC | 39 | 20 | 19 | .513 |
| Cal Baptist | Big West | 1 | 0 | 1 | .000 |
| Cal Poly | Big West | 2 | 1 | 1 | .500 |
| Cal State Bakersfield | Big West | 1 | 0 | 1 | .000 |
| Cal State Fullerton | Big West | 6 | 2 | 4 | .333 |
| Cal State Los Angeles | D-II | 1 | 0 | 1 | .000 |
| Cal State Northridge | Big West | 2 | 0 | 2 | .000 |
| Campbell | CAA | 1 | 0 | 1 | .000 |
| Canisius | Metro | 10 | 6 | 4 | .600 |
| Catholic | D-III | 2 | 0 | 2 | .000 |
| Central Connecticut | NEC | 3 | 0 | 3 | .000 |
| UCF | Big 12 | 7 | 1 | 6 | .143 |
| Central Michigan | MAC | 7 | 3 | 4 | .429 |
| Charleston Southern | Big South | 1 | 0 | 1 | .000 |
| Charlotte | American | 19 | 7 | 12 | .368 |
| Chattanooga | SoCon | 15 | 3 | 12 | .200 |
| Cincinnati | Big 12 | 78 | 46 | 32 | .590 |
| CCNY | D-III | 6 | 4 | 2 | .667 |
| Clemson* | ACC | 30 | 14 | 16 | .467 |
| Cleveland State | Horizon | 6 | 3 | 3 | .500 |
| Coastal Carolina | Sun Belt | 4 | 0 | 4 | .000 |
| Colgate | Patriot | 7 | 0 | 7 | .000 |
| Charleston | CAA | 8 | 1 | 7 | .125 |
| Colorado | Big 12 | 31 | 13 | 18 | .419 |
| Colorado State | Pac-12 | 20 | 6 | 14 | .300 |
| Columbia | Ivy | 6 | 2 | 4 | .333 |
| UConn* | Big East | 111 | 77 | 34 | .694 |
| Coppin State | MEAC | 5 | 1 | 4 | .200 |
| Cornell | Ivy | 8 | 2 | 6 | .250 |
| Creighton | Big East | 48 | 21 | 27 | .438 |
| Dartmouth | Ivy | 17 | 10 | 7 | .588 |
| Davidson | A-10 | 24 | 8 | 16 | .333 |
| Dayton | A-10 | 41 | 20 | 21 | .488 |
| Delaware | CUSA | 6 | 0 | 6 | .000 |
| Delaware State | MEAC | 1 | 0 | 1 | .000 |
| DePaul* | Big East | 46 | 21 | 25 | .457 |
| Detroit Mercy | Horizon | 9 | 3 | 6 | .333 |
| Drake | MVC | 15 | 7 | 8 | .467 |
| Drexel | CAA | 6 | 1 | 5 | .167 |
| Duke | ACC | 172 | 129 | 43 | .750 |
| Duquesne | A-10 | 11 | 5 | 6 | .455 |
| East Carolina | American | 2 | 0 | 2 | .000 |
| East Tennessee State | SoCon | 13 | 2 | 11 | .154 |
| Eastern Illinois | OVC | 2 | 0 | 2 | .000 |
| Eastern Kentucky | United | 8 | 0 | 8 | .000 |
| Eastern Michigan | MAC | 7 | 3 | 4 | .429 |
| Eastern Washington | Big Sky | 3 | 0 | 3 | .000 |
| Evansville | MVC | 6 | 1 | 5 | .167 |
| Fairfield | Metro | 3 | 0 | 3 | .000 |
| Fairleigh Dickinson | NEC | 10 | 3 | 7 | .300 |
| Florida* | SEC | 78 | 55 | 23 | .705 |
| Florida A&M | MEAC | 4 | 1 | 3 | .250 |
| FIU | CUSA | 1 | 0 | 1 | .000 |
| Florida State | ACC | 41 | 23 | 18 | .561 |
| Florida Atlantic | American | 7 | 4 | 3 | .571 |
| Florida Gulf Coast | ASUN | 6 | 3 | 3 | .500 |
| Fordham | A-10 | 6 | 2 | 4 | .333 |
| Fresno State* | Pac-12 | 8 | 2 | 6 | .250 |
| Furman | SoCon | 11 | 2 | 9 | .182 |
| Gardner–Webb | Big South | 1 | 0 | 1 | .000 |
| George Mason | A-10 | 11 | 5 | 6 | .455 |
| George Washington | A-10 | 15 | 4 | 11 | .267 |
| Georgetown | Big East | 77 | 47 | 30 | .610 |
| Georgia* | SEC | 21 | 7 | 14 | .333 |
| Georgia Southern | Sun Belt | 3 | 0 | 3 | .000 |
| Georgia State | Sun Belt | 8 | 2 | 6 | .250 |
| Georgia Tech | ACC | 40 | 23 | 17 | .575 |
| Gonzaga | Pac-12 | 76 | 48 | 28 | .632 |
| Grambling State | SWAC | 2 | 1 | 1 | .500 |
| Grand Canyon | MW | 5 | 1 | 4 | .200 |
| Green Bay | Horizon | 6 | 1 | 5 | .167 |
| Hampton | MEAC | 8 | 2 | 6 | .250 |
| Hardin-Simmons | D-III | 2 | 0 | 2 | .000 |
| Hartford | D-III | 1 | 0 | 1 | .000 |
| Harvard | Ivy | 8 | 2 | 6 | .250 |
| Hawaii | MW | 7 | 1 | 6 | .143 |
| High Point | Big South | 3 | 1 | 2 | .333 |
| Hofstra | CAA | 5 | 0 | 5 | .000 |
| Holy Cross | Patriot | 21 | 8 | 13 | .381 |
| Houston | Big 12 | 79 | 47 | 32 | .595 |
| Houston Christian | Southland | 1 | 0 | 1 | .000 |
| Howard | MEAC | 6 | 1 | 5 | .167 |
| Idaho | Big Sky | 6 | 1 | 5 | .167 |
| Idaho State | Big Sky | 21 | 8 | 13 | .381 |
| Illinois | Big Ten | 87 | 50 | 37 | .575 |
| UIC | Horizon | 3 | 0 | 3 | .000 |
| Illinois State | MVC | 9 | 3 | 6 | .333 |
| Indiana | Big Ten | 104 | 68 | 36 | .654 |
| IU Indy | Horizon | 1 | 0 | 1 | .000 |
| Indiana State | MVC | 9 | 5 | 4 | .556 |
| Iona* | Metro | 17 | 1 | 16 | .059 |
| Iowa | Big Ten | 66 | 34 | 32 | .515 |
| Iowa State | Big 12 | 51 | 26 | 25 | .510 |
| Jackson State | SWAC | 3 | 0 | 3 | .000 |
| Jacksonville | ASUN | 9 | 4 | 5 | .444 |
| Jacksonville State | CUSA | 2 | 0 | 2 | .000 |
| James Madison | Sun Belt | 11 | 5 | 6 | .455 |
| Kansas | Big 12 | 170 | 118 | 52 | .694 |
| Kansas State | Big 12 | 76 | 40 | 36 | .526 |
| Kennesaw State | CUSA | 2 | 0 | 2 | .000 |
| Kent State | MAC | 11 | 4 | 7 | .364 |
| Kentucky* | SEC | 193 | 135 | 58 | .699 |
| La Salle | A-10 | 25 | 14 | 11 | .560 |
| Lafayette | Patriot | 5 | 0 | 5 | .000 |
| Lamar | Southland | 11 | 5 | 6 | .455 |
| Lebanon Valley | D-III | 3 | 1 | 2 | .333 |
| Lehigh | Patriot | 7 | 1 | 6 | .143 |
| Liberty | CUSA | 7 | 1 | 6 | .143 |
| Lipscomb | ASUN | 2 | 0 | 2 | .000 |
| Little Rock | United | 7 | 2 | 5 | .286 |
| Long Beach State* | Big West | 18 | 7 | 11 | .389 |
| LIU | NEC | 8 | 0 | 8 | .000 |
| Longwood | Big South | 2 | 0 | 2 | .000 |
| Louisiana* | Sun Belt | 16 | 4 | 12 | .250 |
| Louisiana-Monroe | Sun Belt | 7 | 0 | 7 | .000 |
| LSU | SEC | 54 | 27 | 27 | .500 |
| Louisiana Tech | Sun Belt | 9 | 4 | 5 | .444 |
| Louisville* | ACC | 123 | 77 | 46 | .626 |
| Loyola Chicago | MVC | 22 | 15 | 7 | .682 |
| Loyola (LA) | NAIA | 3 | 0 | 3 | .000 |
| Loyola (MD) | Patriot | 2 | 0 | 2 | .000 |
| Loyola Marymount* | WCC | 10 | 5 | 5 | .500 |
| Manhattan | Metro | 12 | 3 | 9 | .250 |
| Marist | Metro | 2 | 0 | 2 | .000 |
| Marquette | Big East | 82 | 44 | 38 | .537 |
| Marshall* | Sun Belt | 7 | 1 | 6 | .143 |
| Maryland* | Big Ten | 76 | 46 | 30 | .605 |
| UMBC | America East | 4 | 1 | 3 | .250 |
| UMass* | MAC | 20 | 11 | 9 | .550 |
| McNeese | Southland | 6 | 1 | 5 | .167 |
| Memphis* | American | 64 | 35 | 29 | .547 |
| Mercer | SoCon | 4 | 1 | 3 | .250 |
| Miami (FL) | ACC | 29 | 16 | 13 | .552 |
| Miami (OH) | MAC | 27 | 7 | 20 | .259 |
| Michigan* | Big Ten | 105 | 74 | 31 | .705 |
| Michigan State | Big Ten | 116 | 78 | 38 | .672 |
| Middle Tennessee | CUSA | 13 | 4 | 9 | .308 |
| Milwaukee | Horizon | 7 | 3 | 4 | .429 |
| Minnesota* | Big Ten | 28 | 14 | 14 | .500 |
| Ole Miss | SEC | 17 | 7 | 10 | .412 |
| Mississippi State | SEC | 25 | 11 | 14 | .440 |
| Mississippi Valley State | SWAC | 5 | 0 | 5 | .000 |
| Missouri* | SEC | 54 | 23 | 31 | .426 |
| Missouri State | CUSA | 9 | 3 | 6 | .333 |
| Monmouth | CAA | 5 | 1 | 4 | .200 |
| Montana | Big Sky | 16 | 2 | 14 | .125 |
| Montana State | Big Sky | 6 | 0 | 6 | .000 |
| Morehead State | OVC | 16 | 6 | 10 | .375 |
| Morgan State | MEAC | 2 | 0 | 2 | .000 |
| Mount St. Mary's | Metro | 10 | 3 | 7 | .300 |
| Murray State | MVC | 23 | 5 | 18 | .217 |
| Navy | Patriot | 20 | 8 | 12 | .400 |
| Nebraska | Big Ten | 11 | 2 | 9 | .111 |
| Nevada | MW | 17 | 6 | 11 | .353 |
| UNLV | MW | 52 | 33 | 19 | .635 |
| New Mexico | MW | 27 | 9 | 18 | .333 |
| New Mexico State* | CUSA | 39 | 11 | 28 | .282 |
| New Orleans | Southland | 6 | 1 | 5 | .167 |
| NYU | D-III | 18 | 9 | 9 | .500 |
| Niagara | Metro | 6 | 2 | 4 | .333 |
| Nicholls | Southland | 2 | 0 | 2 | .000 |
| Norfolk State | MEAC | 6 | 2 | 4 | .333 |
| North Carolina | ACC | 186 | 134 | 52 | .720 |
| North Carolina A&T | MEAC | 11 | 1 | 10 | .091 |
| UNC Asheville | Big South | 7 | 2 | 5 | .333 |
| North Carolina Central | MEAC | 4 | 0 | 4 | .000 |
| UNC Greensboro | SoCon | 4 | 0 | 4 | .000 |
| NC State* | ACC | 70 | 41 | 29 | .586 |
| UNC Wilmington | CAA | 8 | 1 | 7 | .125 |
| North Dakota | Summit | 1 | 0 | 1 | .000 |
| North Dakota State | Summit | 7 | 2 | 5 | .286 |
| North Florida | ASUN | 1 | 0 | 1 | .000 |
| North Texas | American | 5 | 1 | 4 | .200 |
| Northeastern | CAA | 12 | 3 | 9 | .250 |
| Northern Arizona | Big Sky | 2 | 0 | 2 | .000 |
| Northern Colorado | Big Sky | 1 | 0 | 1 | .000 |
| Northern Illinois | Horizon | 3 | 0 | 3 | .000 |
| Northern Iowa | MVC | 14 | 5 | 9 | .357 |
| Northern Kentucky | Horizon | 3 | 0 | 3 | .000 |
| Northwestern | Big Ten | 6 | 3 | 3 | .500 |
| Northwestern State | Southland | 5 | 2 | 3 | .400 |
| Notre Dame | ACC | 81 | 40 | 41 | .494 |
| Oakland | Horizon | 6 | 2 | 4 | .333 |
| Ohio | MAC | 23 | 8 | 15 | .348 |
| Ohio State* | Big Ten | 93 | 58 | 35 | .624 |
| Oklahoma | SEC | 77 | 43 | 34 | .558 |
| Oklahoma City | NAIA | 21 | 8 | 13 | .381 |
| Oklahoma State | Big 12 | 67 | 39 | 28 | .582 |
| Old Dominion | Sun Belt | 15 | 3 | 12 | .200 |
| Omaha | Summit | 1 | 0 | 1 | .000 |
| Oral Roberts | Summit | 11 | 4 | 7 | .364 |
| Oregon | Big Ten | 46 | 28 | 18 | .609 |
| Oregon State* | Pac-12 | 36 | 15 | 21 | .417 |
| Pacific | WCC | 14 | 4 | 10 | .286 |
| Pennsylvania | Ivy | 40 | 13 | 27 | .325 |
| Penn State | Big Ten | 22 | 10 | 12 | .455 |
| Pepperdine | WCC | 19 | 5 | 14 | .263 |
| Pittsburgh | ACC | 54 | 26 | 28 | .481 |
| Portland | WCC | 2 | 0 | 2 | .000 |
| Portland State | Big Sky | 2 | 0 | 2 | .000 |
| Prairie View A&M | SWAC | 4 | 1 | 3 | .250 |
| Princeton | Ivy | 45 | 15 | 30 | .333 |
| Providence | Big East | 40 | 17 | 23 | .425 |
| Purdue* | Big Ten | 90 | 53 | 37 | .589 |
| Queens | ASUN | 1 | 0 | 1 | .000 |
| Radford | Big South | 4 | 1 | 3 | .250 |
| Rhode Island | A-10 | 18 | 8 | 10 | .444 |
| Rice | American | 7 | 2 | 5 | .286 |
| Richmond | A-10 | 19 | 9 | 10 | .474 |
| Rider | Metro | 3 | 0 | 3 | .000 |
| Robert Morris | Horizon | 11 | 2 | 9 | .182 |
| Rutgers | Big Ten | 15 | 6 | 9 | .400 |
| Saint Joseph's* | A-10 | 44 | 19 | 25 | .432 |
| Saint Louis | A-10 | 19 | 7 | 12 | .368 |
| Saint Mary's | WCC | 23 | 8 | 15 | .348 |
| Saint Peter's | Metro | 8 | 3 | 5 | .375 |
| Sam Houston | CUSA | 2 | 0 | 2 | .000 |
| Samford | SoCon | 3 | 0 | 3 | .000 |
| San Diego | WCC | 5 | 1 | 4 | .200 |
| San Diego State | Pac-12 | 30 | 13 | 17 | .433 |
| San Francisco | WCC | 36 | 21 | 15 | .583 |
| San Jose State | MW | 3 | 0 | 3 | .000 |
| Santa Clara | WCC | 25 | 11 | 14 | .440 |
| Seattle | WCC | 23 | 10 | 13 | .435 |
| Seton Hall | Big East | 30 | 16 | 14 | .533 |
| Siena | Metro | 11 | 4 | 7 | .364 |
| SIU Edwardsville | OVC | 1 | 0 | 1 | .000 |
| South Alabama | Sun Belt | 9 | 1 | 8 | .111 |
| South Carolina | SEC | 19 | 8 | 11 | .421 |
| South Carolina State | MEAC | 5 | 0 | 5 | .000 |
| South Dakota State | Summit | 7 | 0 | 7 | .000 |
| South Florida | American | 6 | 2 | 4 | .333 |
| Southeast Missouri State | OVC | 2 | 0 | 2 | .000 |
| Southeastern Louisiana | Southland | 1 | 0 | 1 | .000 |
| Southern | SWAC | 10 | 1 | 9 | .100 |
| Southern Illinois | MVC | 16 | 6 | 10 | .375 |
| SMU | ACC | 25 | 10 | 15 | .400 |
| Southern Miss | Sun Belt | 3 | 0 | 3 | .000 |
| Southern Utah | Big Sky | 1 | 0 | 1 | .000 |
| Springfield | D-III | 1 | 0 | 1 | .000 |
| St. Bonaventure | A-10 | 17 | 7 | 10 | .412 |
| Saint Francis | D-III | 2 | 0 | 2 | .000 |
| St. John's* | Big East | 64 | 30 | 34 | .469 |
| Stanford | ACC | 39 | 23 | 16 | .590 |
| Stephen F. Austin* | Southland | 7 | 2 | 5 | .286 |
| Stetson | ASUN | 1 | 0 | 1 | .000 |
| Stony Brook | CAA | 1 | 0 | 1 | .000 |
| Syracuse* | ACC | 111 | 70 | 41 | .631 |
| Temple | American | 66 | 33 | 33 | .500 |
| Tennessee | SEC | 63 | 34 | 29 | .540 |
| Tennessee State | OVC | 3 | 0 | 3 | .000 |
| Tennessee Tech | SoCon | 2 | 0 | 2 | .000 |
| Texas | SEC | 86 | 43 | 43 | .500 |
| Texas A&M | SEC | 35 | 16 | 19 | .457 |
| Texas A&M-Corpus Christi | Southland | 4 | 1 | 3 | .250 |
| UT Arlington | United | 1 | 0 | 1 | .000 |
| UTEP | MW | 30 | 14 | 16 | .467 |
| UTSA | American | 5 | 1 | 4 | .200 |
| TCU | Big 12 | 20 | 8 | 12 | .400 |
| Texas Southern | SWAC | 14 | 3 | 11 | .214 |
| Texas State | Pac-12 | 2 | 0 | 2 | .000 |
| Texas Tech* | Big 12 | 46 | 23 | 23 | .500 |
| Toledo | MAC | 5 | 1 | 4 | .200 |
| Towson | CAA | 2 | 0 | 2 | .000 |
| Trinity (TX) | D-III | 1 | 0 | 1 | .000 |
| Troy | Sun Belt | 4 | 0 | 4 | .000 |
| Tufts | D-III | 2 | 0 | 2 | .000 |
| Tulane | American | 6 | 3 | 3 | .500 |
| Tulsa | American | 28 | 12 | 16 | .429 |
| UC Davis | MW | 2 | 1 | 1 | .500 |
| UC Irvine | Big West | 3 | 1 | 2 | .333 |
| UCLA* | Big Ten | 164 | 117 | 47 | .713 |
| UC San Diego | Big West | 1 | 0 | 1 | .000 |
| UC Santa Barbara | Big West | 8 | 1 | 7 | .125 |
| USC* | Big Ten | 40 | 17 | 23 | .425 |
| Utah | Big 12 | 70 | 38 | 32 | .543 |
| Utah State | Pac-12 | 36 | 8 | 28 | .222 |
| Valparaiso | MVC | 11 | 2 | 9 | .182 |
| Vanderbilt | SEC | 29 | 11 | 18 | .379 |
| Vermont | America East | 12 | 2 | 10 | .167 |
| Villanova* | Big East | 111 | 71 | 40 | .640 |
| Virginia | ACC | 62 | 36 | 26 | .581 |
| VCU | A-10 | 34 | 14 | 20 | .412 |
| VMI | SoCon | 6 | 3 | 3 | .500 |
| Virginia Tech | ACC | 21 | 8 | 13 | .381 |
| Wagner | NEC | 3 | 1 | 2 | .333 |
| Wake Forest | ACC | 51 | 28 | 23 | .549 |
| Washington | Big Ten | 37 | 19 | 18 | .514 |
| Washington State | Pac-12 | 14 | 7 | 7 | .500 |
| Wayne State (MI) | D-II | 3 | 1 | 2 | .333 |
| Weber State | Big Sky | 23 | 6 | 17 | .261 |
| West Texas A&M | D-II | 1 | 0 | 1 | .000 |
| West Virginia | Big 12 | 63 | 32 | 31 | .508 |
| Western Carolina | SoCon | 1 | 0 | 1 | .000 |
| Western Kentucky* | CUSA | 44 | 19 | 25 | .432 |
| Western Michigan | MAC | 6 | 2 | 4 | .333 |
| Wichita State | American | 35 | 18 | 17 | .514 |
| Williams | D-III | 1 | 0 | 1 | .000 |
| Winthrop | Big South | 12 | 1 | 11 | .083 |
| Wisconsin | Big Ten | 69 | 41 | 28 | .594 |
| Wofford | SoCon | 7 | 1 | 6 | .143 |
| Wright State | Horizon | 6 | 1 | 5 | .167 |
| Wyoming | MW | 30 | 9 | 21 | .300 |
| Xavier | Big East | 61 | 31 | 30 | .508 |
| Yale | Ivy | 11 | 2 | 9 | .182 |

*Team vacating NCAA Tournament action

== See also ==
- NCAA Division I men's basketball tournament records
