= 1958–59 Wisconsin Badgers men's basketball team =

American college basketball season

1958–59 Wisconsin Badgers men's basketball
- Conference: Big Ten Conference
- Record: 3–19 (1–13 Big Ten)
- Head coach: Harold E. Foster
- Home arena: UW Fieldhouse

1958–59 Big Ten Conference men's basketball standings
	Conf.				Overall
Team	W		L	PCT	W		L	PCT
No. 7 Michigan State	12	–	2	.857	19	–	4	.826
Northwestern	8	–	6	.571	15	–	7	.682
Michigan	8	–	6	.571	15	–	7	.682
Purdue	8	–	6	.571	15	–	7	.682
Illinois	7	–	7	.500	12	–	10	.545
Indiana	7	–	7	.500	11	–	11	.500
Ohio State	7	–	7	.500	11	–	11	.500
Iowa	7	–	7	.500	10	–	12	.455
Minnesota	5	–	9	.357	8	–	14	.364
Wisconsin	1	–	13	.071	3	–	19	.136
Rankings from AP Poll

The 1958–59 Wisconsin Badgers men's basketball team represented University of Wisconsin–Madison. The head coach was Harold E. Foster, coaching his twentyfifth season with the Badgers. The team played their home games at the UW Fieldhouse in Madison, Wisconsin and was a member of the Big Ten Conference.

== Schedule ==
Date time, TV	Rank^{#}	Opponent^{#}	Result	Record	Site city, state
Regular Season
12/02/1958*		Marquette	L 47–76	0–1	UW Fieldhouse; Madison, WI
12/06/1958*		at Rice	L 37–78	0–2	Tudor Fieldhouse; Houston, TX
12/08/1958*		at Southern Methodist	L 63–81	0–3	Moody Coliseum; University Park, TX
12/13/1958*		Notre Dame	W 56–54	1–3	UW Fieldhouse; Madison, WI
12/15/1958*		Missouri	W 68–60	2–3	UW Fieldhouse; Madison, WI
12/19/1958*		Washington	L 48–62	2–4	UW Fieldhouse; Madison, WI
12/20/1958*		vs. California	L 53–68	2–5	Iowa Field House; Iowa City, IA
12/30/1958*		at Butler	L 55–69	2–6	Butler Fieldhouse; Indianapolis, IN
1/03/1959		at Minnesota	L 66–79	2–7 (0–1)	Williams Arena; Minneapolis, MN
1/05/1959		Illinois	L 51–77	2–8 (0–2)	UW Fieldhouse; Madison, WI
1/10/1959		at Purdue	L 61–84	2–9 (0–3)	Lambert Fieldhouse; West Lafayette, IN
1/12/1959		Michigan	L 74–84	2–10 (0–4)	UW Fieldhouse; Madison, WI
2/02/1959		No. 7 Michigan State	L 57–88	2–11 (0–5)	UW Fieldhouse; Madison, WI
2/07/1959		at Ohio State	L 72–78	2–12 (0–6)	St. John Arena; Columbus, OH
2/09/1959		Purdue	W 91–86	3–12 (1–6)	UW Fieldhouse; Madison, WI
2/14/1959		Iowa	L 84–94	3–13 (1–7)	UW Fieldhouse; Madison, WI
2/16/1959		at Illinois	L 54–93	3–14 (1–8)	Huff Hall; Champaign, IL
2/21/1959		Minnesota	L 50–69	3–15 (1–9)	UW Fieldhouse; Madison, WI
2/23/1959		at Michigan	L 63–87	3–16 (1–10)	Yost Fieldhouse; Ann Arbor, MI
2/28/1959		Northwestern	L 82–86	3–17 (1–11)	UW Fieldhouse; Madison, WI
3/02/1959		at No. 6 Michigan State	L 73–93	3–18 (1–12)	Jenison Fieldhouse; East Lansing, MI
3/07/1959		at Indiana	L 71–97	3–19 (1–13)	The Fieldhouse; Bloomington, IN
*Non-conference game. ^{#}Rankings from AP Poll. (#) Tournament seedings in parentheses.
