= 1958–59 Louisville Cardinals men's basketball team =

American college basketball season

1958–59 Louisville Cardinals men's basketball

NCAA Mideast Regional Champions

NCAA Men's Division I Tournament National Third Place Game, L 98-85 v. Cincinnati
- Conference: Independent
- Record: 19-12
- Head coach: Peck Hickman
- Home arena: Freedom Hall

The 1958–59 Louisville Cardinals men's basketball team represented the University of Louisville during the 1958–59 NCAA Division I men's basketball season, Louisville's 46th season of intercollegiate competition. The Cardinals competed independents (no conference) and were coached by Peck Hickman, who was in his fifteenth season. The team played its home games at Freedom Hall.

Louisville beat #2 Kentucky and #7 Michigan State to win the NCAA tournament Mideast Regional and advance to the Final Four (their 1st) where they fell to eventual runner-up West Virginia 94–79. They finished fourth, falling to Cincinnati in the third place game 98–85. The Cardinals finished with a 19–12 record.
