= 1958–59 Michigan Wolverines men's basketball team =

American college basketball season

1958–59 Michigan Wolverines men's basketball
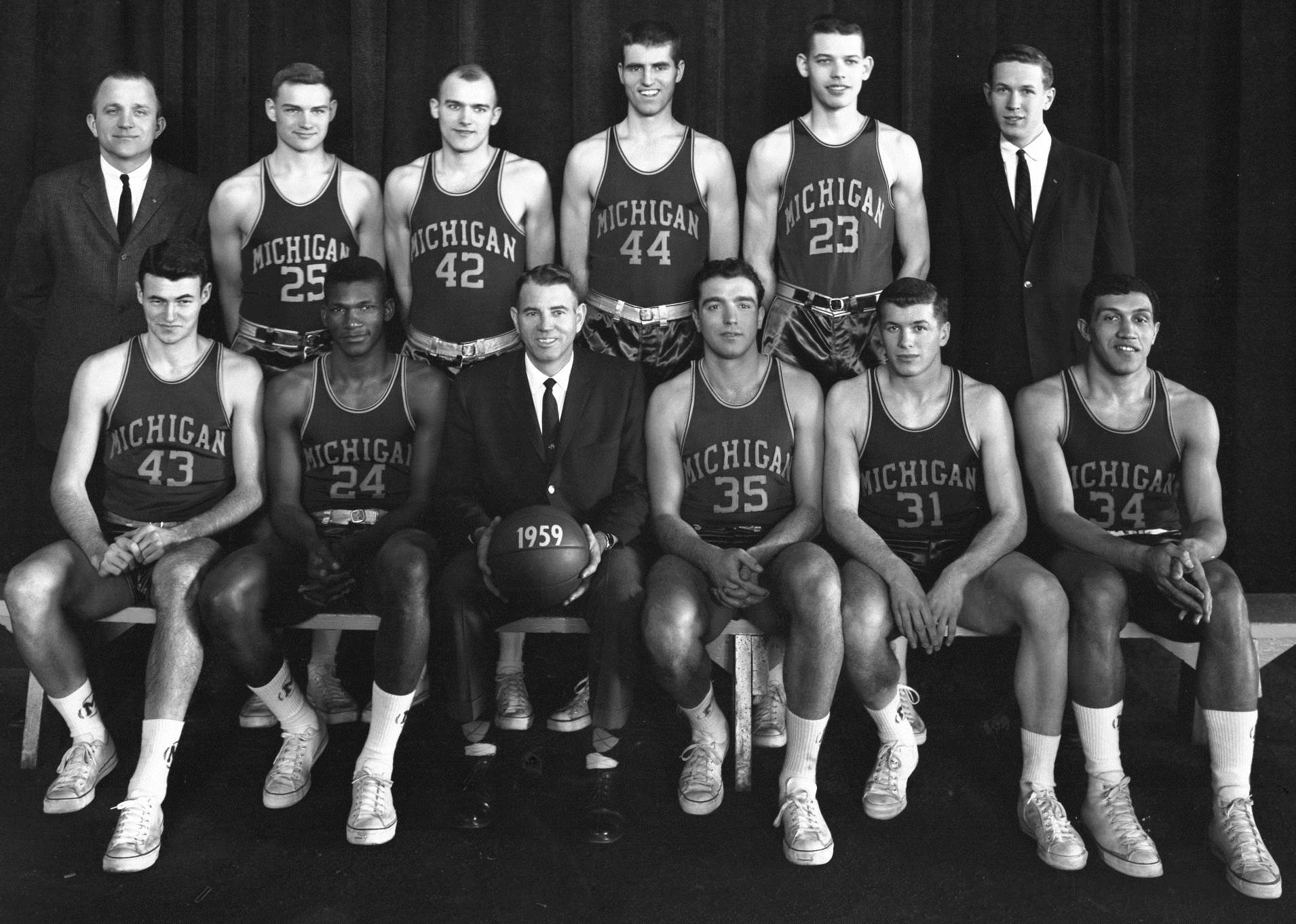
- Conference: Big Ten Conference
- Record: 15–7 (8–6 Big Ten)
- Head coach: William Perigo
- Assistant coaches: Dave Strack; Matt Patanelli
- MVP: M. C. Burton Jr.
- Captains: M. C. Burton Jr.; George Lee
- Home arena: Fielding H. Yost Field House

1958–59 Big Ten Conference men's basketball standings
	Conf.				Overall
Team	W		L	PCT	W		L	PCT
No. 7 Michigan State	12	–	2	.857	19	–	4	.826
Northwestern	8	–	6	.571	15	–	7	.682
Michigan	8	–	6	.571	15	–	7	.682
Purdue	8	–	6	.571	15	–	7	.682
Illinois	7	–	7	.500	12	–	10	.545
Indiana	7	–	7	.500	11	–	11	.500
Ohio State	7	–	7	.500	11	–	11	.500
Iowa	7	–	7	.500	10	–	12	.455
Minnesota	5	–	9	.357	8	–	14	.364
Wisconsin	1	–	13	.071	3	–	19	.136
Rankings from AP Poll

The 1958–59 Michigan Wolverines men's basketball team represented the University of Michigan in intercollegiate college basketball during the 1958–59 season. The team played its home games at Fielding H. Yost Field House (renamed Yost Ice Arena in 1973) on the school's campus in Ann Arbor, Michigan. Under the direction of head coach William Perigo, the team finished tied for second in the Big Ten Conference but failed to get an invitation to either the 1959 NCAA Men's Division I Basketball Tournament or the 1959 National Invitation Tournament.

During the season, the team beat two of the four ranked opponents that it faced (#18 Purdue in the conference season opener on January 3, 1959, at West Lafayette and #18 Illinois on February 2 in Champaign). M.C. Burton, Jr. won the Big Ten Conference statistical championships for both scoring (22.6 points per game) and rebounding (249 in 14 conference games for a 17.8 rebound average). The 17.8 rebounds per game was a Big Ten Conference record that lasted one season. Burton was the first player to lead the conference in both scoring and rebounding. Burton and George Lee served as team co-captains, and Burton earned team MVP.

Burton set numerous school rebounding records that season. Two that continue to stand are the 17.23 single-season rebounds per game average and the single-season record for 20-rebound games with seven. Bill Buntin surpassed his career total of 831 with 1037 and his career average of 12.59 with 13.13 in 1965. Rudy Tomjanovich surpassed his February 16 total of 27 with 30 on February 1, 1969. Phil Hubbard surpassed his single season total of 379 with 389 in 1977. Burton also fell four points shy of Ron Kramer's 1957 school record career total of 1119. Burton's career free throw percentage of 79.28 stood as the school record (since records have been available in 1955) until Cazzie Russell ended his career with an 82.65%.

== Team players drafted into the NBA ==
Three players from this team were selected in the NBA draft.

Year	Round	Pick	Overall	Player	NBA Club
1959	4	2	24	George Lee	Detroit Pistons
1959	11	2	73	M. C. Burton	Detroit Pistons
1961	4	6	38	John Tidwell	Philadelphia Warriors
