= 1958–59 Illinois Fighting Illini men's basketball team =

American college basketball season

1958–59 Illinois Fighting Illini men's basketball
- Conference: Big Ten Conference
- Record: 12–10 (7-7 Big Ten)
- Head coach: Harry Combes (12th season)
- Assistant coaches: Howie Braun (22nd season); Jim Wright (1st season)
- MVP: Roger Taylor
- Captain: Roger Taylor
- Home arena: Huff Hall

1958–59 Big Ten Conference men's basketball standings
	Conf.				Overall
Team	W		L	PCT	W		L	PCT
No. 7 Michigan State	12	–	2	.857	19	–	4	.826
Northwestern	8	–	6	.571	15	–	7	.682
Michigan	8	–	6	.571	15	–	7	.682
Purdue	8	–	6	.571	15	–	7	.682
Illinois	7	–	7	.500	12	–	10	.545
Indiana	7	–	7	.500	11	–	11	.500
Ohio State	7	–	7	.500	11	–	11	.500
Iowa	7	–	7	.500	10	–	12	.455
Minnesota	5	–	9	.357	8	–	14	.364
Wisconsin	1	–	13	.071	3	–	19	.136
Rankings from AP Poll

The 1958–59 Illinois Fighting Illini men’s basketball team represented the University of Illinois.

== Regular season ==
University of Illinois' head coach, Harry Combes and his Fighting Illini basketball team once again led the Big Ten in wins for a decade with a 165-64 record in the 1950s. The Illini’s winning percentage, .721, ranked 11th nationally. Additionally, the Associated Press began its basketball poll in 1949 with United Press International adding its poll in 1951 and from 1951-56 the Illini finished the season ranked in the Top 20 nationally every year. Illinois’ highest final ranking in the 1950s was second in both polls in 1952.

The 1958-59 team utilized several returning lettermen including the leading scorer, team "captain" and team "MVP" Roger Taylor. It also saw the return of Mannie Jackson, Govoner Vaughn, Bruce Bunkenberg, Al Gosnell, Lou Landt and Ed Perry. The Illini finished the season with a conference record of 7 wins and 7 losses, finishing tied for 5th place in the Big Ten. They would finish with an overall record of 12 wins and 10 losses. During the season, the Illini would play Kentucky, the No. 1 ranked team in the nation, at a Freedom Hall in Louisville. The outcome of this game would be a 75-76 loss. The starting lineup included John Wessels at the center position, Roger Taylor and Mannie Jackson at guard and Govoner Vaughn, Ed Perry and Al Gosnell at the forward slots.

=== Roster ===
1958–59 Illinois Fighting Illini men's basketball team
Players
Coaches

Pos.	#	Name	Height	Weight	Year	Previous school	Hometown
C	10	John Wessels	6 ft 7 in (2.01 m)	210 lb (95 kg)	So	Rockford West High School	Rockford, Illinois
G	11	Roger Taylor (C)	6 ft 0 in (1.83 m)	170 lb (77 kg)	Sr	Rich High School	Park Forest, Illinois
G	12	Lee Frandsen	6 ft 3 in (1.91 m)	155 lb (70 kg)	Jr	Davenport Central High School	Davenport, Iowa
G	14	Jim Dorris	6 ft 1 in (1.85 m)	185 lb (84 kg)	Jr	Centralia High School	Centralia, Illinois
F	15	Bob Schmidt	6 ft 5 in (1.96 m)	180 lb (82 kg)	Jr	Kankakee High School	Kankakee, Illinois
F	20	Bruce Bunkenburg	6 ft 4 in (1.93 m)	190 lb (86 kg)	Jr	Roosevelt High School	Chicago, Illinois
F	22	Ed Perry	6 ft 5 in (1.96 m)	195 lb (88 kg)	Jr	Salem High School	Salem, Illinois
F	24	Ken Charlcraft	6 ft 3 in (1.91 m)	192 lb (87 kg)	So	Maroa-Forsyth High School	Maroa, Illinois
C	25	John Homeier	6 ft 3 in (1.91 m)	185 lb (84 kg)	Jr	Feitshans High School	Springfield, Illinois
G	30	Mannie Jackson	6 ft 3 in (1.91 m)	175 lb (79 kg)	Jr	Edwardsville High School	Edwardsville, Illinois
G	32	Lou Landt	6 ft 3 in (1.91 m)	180 lb (82 kg)	Jr	Roosevelt High School	Berwyn, Illinois
F	33	Al Gosnell	6 ft 3 in (1.91 m)	190 lb (86 kg)	Jr	Lawrenceville High School	Lawrenceville, Illinois
F	34	Roger DeVries	6 ft 3 in (1.91 m)	175 lb (79 kg)	So	Forreston High School	Forreston, Illinois
F	35	Govoner Vaughn	6 ft 3 in (1.91 m)	185 lb (84 kg)	Jr	Edwardsville High School	Edwardsville, Illinois
F	40	Tom Adams	6 ft 5 in (1.96 m)	185 lb (84 kg)	Jr	Washington Community High School	Washington, Illinois
G	41	John Easterbrook	5 ft 8 in (1.73 m)	150 lb (68 kg)	So	Champaign Central High School	Champaign, Illinois
G	42	Phil Flanigan	5 ft 8 in (1.73 m)	140 lb (64 kg)	Sr	Tuscola High School	Tuscola, Illinois
G	44	Bill Larson	6 ft 1 in (1.85 m)	170 lb (77 kg)	Sr	Rochelle Township High School	Rochelle, Illinois
G	51	Bill Mohlenbrock	6 ft 3 in (1.91 m)	178 lb (81 kg)	So	Murphysboro High School	Murphysboro, Illinois
C	52	Vern Altemeyer	6 ft 8 in (2.03 m)	210 lb (95 kg)	So	Scottsburg Senior High School	Scottsburg, Indiana

Head coach

- Harry Combes (University of Illinois) (12th year)

Assistant coach(es)

- Howie Braun (University of Illinois) (22nd year)
- Jim Wright (University of Illinois) (1st year)

Legend

- (C) Team captain
- (S) Suspended
- (I) Ineligible
- (W) Walk-on
- Injured
- Current redshirt

Roster

== Schedule ==
Date time, TV	Rank^{#}	Opponent^{#}	Result	Record	Site (attendance) city, state
Non-Conference regular season
12/1/1958*		Butler	W 103–79	1-0	Huff Hall (6,057); Champaign, IL
12/6/1958*		at Marquette	L 53–69	1-1	Marquette Gymnasium (9,280); Milwaukee, WI
12/13/1958*		College of Pacific	W 85–67	2-1	Huff Hall (6,257); Champaign, IL
12/15/1958*		Iowa State	W 68–46	3-1	Huff Hall (6,328); Champaign, IL
12/20/1958*		New York University	W 83–78	4-1	Huff Hall (3,401); Champaign, IL
12/23/1958*		Stanford	W 71–62	5-1	Huff Hall (3,203); Champaign, IL
12/30/1958*		vs. No. 1 Kentucky	L 75–76	5-2	Freedom Hall (18,274); Louisville, KY
Big Ten regular season
1/3/1959		Ohio State	W 81–80	6-2 (1-0)	Huff Hall (3,454); Champaign, IL
1/5/1959		at Wisconsin	W 77–51	7-2 (2-0)	Wisconsin Field House (3,618); Madison, WI
1/10/1959	No. 20	No. 5 Michigan State	L 96–97	7-3 (2-1)	Huff Hall (6,649); Champaign, IL
1/12/1959	No. 20	Iowa; Rivalry	W 103–97	8-3 (3-1)	Huff Hall (6,887); Champaign, IL
1/24/1959*		vs. Notre Dame	L 75–85	8-4	Chicago Stadium (-); Chicago, IL
1/26/1959		at Minnesota	L 70–81	8-5 (3-2)	Williams Arena (7,965); Minneapolis, MN
1/31/1959	No. 18	at Purdue	L 81–102	8-6 (3-3)	Lambert Fieldhouse (10,000); West Lafayette, IN
2/2/1959	No. 18	Michigan	L 85–87	8-7 (3-4)	Huff Hall (6,901); Champaign, IL
2/7/1959		at Northwestern; Rivalry	L 79–88	8-8 (3-5)	McGaw Memorial Hall (9,045); Evanston, IL
2/9/1959		at Indiana; Rivalry	W 89–83	9-8 (4-5)	The Fieldhouse (9,500); Bloomington, IN
2/16/1959		Wisconsin	W 93–54	10-8 (5-5)	Huff Hall (6,067); Champaign, IL
2/21/1959		No. 19 Indiana; Rivalry	W 100–98	11-8 (6-5)	Huff Hall (6,712); Champaign, IL
2/28/1959		at Iowa; Rivalry	W 72–70	12-8 (7-5)	Iowa Field House (15,125); Iowa City, IA
3/2/1959		at Michigan	L 95-101	12-9 (6-7)	Yost Field House (4,500); Ann Arbor, MI
3/7/1959		Northwestern; Rivalry	L 81–84	12-10 (7-7)	Huff Hall (6,376); Champaign, IL
*Non-conference game. ^{#}Rankings from AP Poll. (#) Tournament seedings in parentheses. All times are in Central Time.

== Player stats ==
Player	Games played	Field goals	Free throws	Rebounds	Points
Roger Taylor	21	158	60	68	376
John Wessels	22	126	75	205	327
Mannie Jackson	22	137	25	89	299
Govoner Vaughn	21	110	43	170	263
Al Gosnell	22	59	49	108	167
Ed Perry	22	46	22	93	114
Vern Altemeyer	21	34	25	80	93
Lou Landt	19	36	11	34	83
Bruce Bunkenburg	13	17	12	41	46
Lee Frandsen	15	12	2	14	26
John Easterbrook	12	4	5	3	13
Tom Adams	6	2	0	2	4
Jim Dorris	5	1	2	6	4
Bob Schmidt	3	0	0	2	0
Bill Mohlenbrock	4	0	0	0	0
John Homeier	2	0	0	1	0

== Awards and honors ==
- Roger Taylor
  - Converse Honorable Mention All-American
  - Team Most Valuable Player

== Team players drafted into the NBA ==
Player	NBA club	Round	Pick
Roger Taylor	Syracuse Nationals	5	5
