= 1958–59 Indiana Hoosiers men's basketball team =

American college basketball season

1958–59 Indiana Hoosiers men's basketball
- Conference: Big Ten Conference
- Record: 11–11 (7–7 Big Ten)
- Head coach: Branch McCracken (18th season)
- Assistant coaches: Lou Watson; Gene Ring
- Captain: Gene Flowers
- Home arena: The Fieldhouse

1958–59 Big Ten Conference men's basketball standings
	Conf.				Overall
Team	W		L	PCT	W		L	PCT
No. 7 Michigan State	12	–	2	.857	19	–	4	.826
Northwestern	8	–	6	.571	15	–	7	.682
Michigan	8	–	6	.571	15	–	7	.682
Purdue	8	–	6	.571	15	–	7	.682
Illinois	7	–	7	.500	12	–	10	.545
Indiana	7	–	7	.500	11	–	11	.500
Ohio State	7	–	7	.500	11	–	11	.500
Iowa	7	–	7	.500	10	–	12	.455
Minnesota	5	–	9	.357	8	–	14	.364
Wisconsin	1	–	13	.071	3	–	19	.136
Rankings from AP Poll

The 1958–59 Indiana Hoosiers men's basketball team represented Indiana University. Their head coach was Branch McCracken, who was in his 18th year. The team played its home games in The Fieldhouse in Bloomington, Indiana, and was a member of the Big Ten Conference.

The Hoosiers finished the regular season with an overall record of 11–11 and a conference record of 7–7, finishing 5th in the Big Ten Conference. Indiana was not invited to participate in any postseason tournament.

== Roster ==
No.	Name	Position	Ht.	Year	Hometown
13	Bob Reinhart	G	5–10	Jr.	Dale, Indiana
15	Gary Long	G	6–1	So.	Shelbyville, Indiana
20	Al Schlegelmilch	G	6–1	Jr.	Monticello, Indiana
21	Leroy Johnson	F	6–4	So.	Mishawaka, Indiana
23	Stan Hill	G	5–10	Jr.	Seymour, Indiana
24	Herbie Lee	G	5–11	So.	South Bend, Indiana
25	Glen Butte	F	6–4	Jr.	Milan, Indiana
30	Lee Aldridge	C	6–6	Sr.	Switz City, Indiana
31	Norbert Witte	C	6–7	Jr.	Decatur, Indiana
32	Gene Flowers	F	6–2	Sr.	Muncie, Indiana
33	Frank Radovich	F	6–7	Jr.	Hammond, Indiana
35	Walt Bellamy	C	6–11	So.	New Bern, North Carolina
41	Leroy Gamble	G	5–10	So.	Gary, Indiana
42	Bill Balch	F	6–5	Sr.	Crawfordsville, Indiana
43	Randy Williams	F	6–3	So.	Gary, Indiana
44	Bob Wilkinson	G	6–1	Jr.	LaPorte, Indiana
45	Ron Horn	F	6–6	So.	Gas City, Indiana

== Schedule/results ==
Date time, TV	Rank^{#}	Opponent^{#}	Result	Record	Site city, state
Regular season
12/1/1958*		Drake	W 68–59	1–0	The Fieldhouse; Bloomington, IN
12/6/1958*		at Kansas State	L 79–82	1–1	Ahearn Field House; Manhattan, KS
12/13/1958*	No. 19	Missouri	W 87–72	2–1	The Fieldhouse; Bloomington, IN
12/19/1958*		at Oregon State	W 57–53	3–1	Oregon State Coliseum; Corvallis, OR
12/20/1958*		at Oregon State	L 69–73	3–2	Oregon State Coliseum; Corvallis, OR
12/26/1958*		vs. Notre Dame; Hoosier Classic	L 67–73	3–3	Butler Fieldhouse; Indianapolis, IN
12/27/1958*		at Butler; Hoosier Classic	L 76–81	3–4	Butler Fieldhouse; Indianapolis, IN
1/3/1959		at Michigan State	L 77–79	3–5 (0–1)	Jenison Fieldhouse; East Lansing, MI
1/5/1959		Purdue; Rivalry	W 77–69	4–5 (1–1)	The Fieldhouse; Bloomington, IN
1/10/1959		at Northwestern	W 76–69	5–5 (2–1)	Welsh-Ryan Arena; Evanston, IL
1/12/1959		Minnesota	W 63–59	6–5 (3–1)	The Fieldhouse; Bloomington, IN
1/17/1959	No. 19	Iowa	L 78–88	6–6 (3–2)	The Fieldhouse; Bloomington, IN
1/31/1959*		DePaul	W 75–69	7–6 (3–2)	The Fieldhouse; Bloomington, IN
2/2/1959		at Ohio State	W 122–92	8–6 (4–2)	St. John Arena; Columbus, OH
2/7/1959		at Michigan	W 84–79	9–6 (5–2)	Yost Field House; Ann Arbor, MI
2/9/1959		Illinois; Rivalry	L 83–89	9–7 (5–3)	The Fieldhouse; Bloomington, IN
2/14/1959	No. 15	at Minnesota	W 62–57	10–7 (6–3)	Williams Arena; Minneapolis, MN
2/16/1959	No. 15	at Purdue; Rivalry	L 89–94	10–8 (6–4)	Lambert Fieldhouse; West Lafayette, IN
2/21/1959	No. 19	at Illinois; Rivalry	L 98–100	10–9 (6–5)	Huff Hall; Champaign, IL
2/23/1959	No. 19	Ohio State	L 83–92	10–10 (6–6)	The Fieldhouse; Bloomington, IN
2/28/1959		Michigan State	L 82–86	10–11 (6–7)	The Fieldhouse; Bloomington, IN
3/7/1959		Wisconsin	W 97–71	11–11 (7–7)	New Fieldhouse; Bloomington, IN
*Non-conference game. ^{#}Rankings from AP Poll. (#) Tournament seedings in parentheses.
