= 1959 NCAA University Division basketball tournament =

Edition of USA college basketball tournament

- Season: 1958–59
- Teams: 23
- Finals site: Freedom Hall, Louisville, Kentucky
- Champions: California Golden Bears (1st title, 1st title game, 2nd Final Four)
- Runner-up: West Virginia Mountaineers (1st title game, 1st Final Four)
- Third place: Cincinnati Bearcats (1st Final Four)
- Fourth place: Louisville Cardinals (1st Final Four)
- Winning coach: Pete Newell (1st title)
- MOP: Jerry West (West Virginia)
- Attendance: 161,809
- Top scorer: Jerry West (West Virginia) (160 points)

The 1959 NCAA University Division basketball tournament involved 23 schools playing in single-elimination play to determine the national champion of men's NCAA Division I college basketball in the United States. The 21st annual edition of the tournament began on March 7, 1959, and ended with the championship game on March 21, at Freedom Hall in Louisville, Kentucky. A total of 27 games were played, including a third place game in each region and a national third place game.

California, coached by Pete Newell, won the national title with a 71–70 victory in the final game over West Virginia, coached by Fred Schaus. Jerry West of West Virginia was named the tournament's Most Outstanding Player.

== Locations ==
| Round | Region | Site | Venue |
|---|---|---|---|
| First Round | East | New York, New York | Madison Square Garden |
| First Round | Mideast | Lexington, Kentucky | Memorial Coliseum |
| First Round | Midwest | Portland, Oregon | Pacific International Livestock Exposition |
| First Round | West | Las Cruces, New Mexico | Las Cruces High School Gym |
| Regionals | East | Charlotte, North Carolina | Charlotte Coliseum |
| Regionals | Mideast | Evanston, Illinois | McGaw Memorial Hall |
| Regionals | Midwest | Lawrence, Kansas | Allen Fieldhouse |
| Regionals | West | San Francisco, California | Cow Palace |
| Final Four | | Louisville, Kentucky | Freedom Hall |

== Teams ==
| Region | Team | Coach | Conference | Finished | Final Opponent | Score |
East
| East | Boston University | Matt Zunic | Independent | Regional Runner-up | West Virginia | L 86–82 |
| East | Connecticut | Hugh Greer | Yankee | First round | Boston University | L 60–58 |
| East | Dartmouth | Doggie Julian | Ivy League | First round | West Virginia | L 82–68 |
| East | Navy | Ben Carnevale | Independent | Regional third place | Saint Joseph's | W 70–56 |
| East | North Carolina | Frank McGuire | Atlantic Coast | First round | Navy | L 76–63 |
| East | Saint Joseph's | Jack Ramsay | Middle Atlantic | Regional Fourth Place | Navy | L 70–56 |
| East | West Virginia | Fred Schaus | Southern | Runner Up | California | L 71–70 |
Mideast
| Mideast | Bowling Green | Harold Anderson | Mid-American | First round | Marquette | L 89–71 |
| Mideast | Eastern Kentucky | Paul McBrayer | Ohio Valley | First round | Louisville | L 77–63 |
| Mideast | Kentucky | Adolph Rupp | Southeastern | Regional third place | Marquette | W 98–69 |
| Mideast | Louisville | Peck Hickman | Independent | Fourth Place | Cincinnati | L 98–85 |
| Mideast | Marquette | Eddie Hickey | Independent | Regional Fourth Place | Kentucky | L 98–69 |
| Mideast | Michigan State | Forddy Anderson | Big Ten | Regional Runner-up | Louisville | L 88–81 |
Midwest
| Midwest | Cincinnati | George Smith | Missouri Valley | Third Place | Louisville | W 98–85 |
| Midwest | DePaul | Ray Meyer | Independent | Regional Fourth Place | TCU | L 71–65 |
| Midwest | Kansas State | Tex Winter | Big 8 | Regional Runner-up | Cincinnati | L 85–75 |
| Midwest | Portland | Al Negratti | Independent | First round | DePaul | L 57–56 |
| Midwest | TCU | Buster Brannon | Southwest | Regional third place | DePaul | W 71–65 |
West
| West | California | Pete Newell | Pacific Coast | Champion | West Virginia | W 71–70 |
| West | Idaho State | John Grayson | Independent | Regional third place | Utah | W 71–65 |
| West | New Mexico State | Presley Askew | Border | First round | Idaho State | L 62–61 |
| West | Saint Mary's | James Weaver | West Coast Athletic | Regional Runner-up | California | L 66–46 |
| West | Utah | Jack Gardner | Mountain States | Regional Fourth Place | Idaho State | L 71–65 |

== Bracket ==
=== East region ===
Quarterfinals
West Virginia | 82
Dartmouth | 68
Boston University | 60
Connecticut | 58
Navy | 76
North Carolina | 63

Semifinals
Saint Joseph's | 92
West Virginia | 95
Boston University | 62
Navy | 55

Finals
West Virginia | 86
Boston University | 82

=== Mideast region ===
Quarterfinals
Louisville | 77
Eastern Kentucky | 63
Marquette | 89
Bowling Green | 71

Semifinals
Kentucky | 61
Louisville | 76
Michigan State | 74
Marquette | 69

Finals
Louisville | 88
Michigan State | 81

=== Midwest region ===
Quarterfinals
DePaul | 57
Portland | 56

Semifinals
Kansas State | 102
DePaul | 70
Cincinnati | 77
TCU | 73

Finals
Kansas State | 75
Cincinnati | 85

=== West region ===
Quarterfinals
Idaho State | 62
New Mexico State | 61

Semifinals
Saint Mary's | 80
Idaho State | 71
California | 71
Utah | 53

Finals
Saint Mary's | 46
California | 66

=== Final Four ===
National Semifinals
E | West Virginia | 94
ME | Louisville | 79
MW | Cincinnati | 58
W | California | 64

National Finals
E | West Virginia | 70
W | California | 71

=== National Third Place Game ===
| National Third Place Game |
| MW | Cincinnati | 98 |
| ME | Louisville | 85 |

=== Regional third place games ===
| East Regional third place |
| Navy | 70 |
| Saint Joseph's | 56 |

| Mideast Regional third place |
| Kentucky | 98 |
| Marquette | 69 |

| Midwest Regional third place |
| TCU | 71 |
| DePaul | 65 |

| West Regional third place |
| Idaho State | 71 |
| Utah | 65 |

== See also ==
- 1959 NCAA College Division basketball tournament
- 1959 National Invitation Tournament
- 1959 NAIA basketball tournament

== Notes ==
- Mississippi State qualified for the tournament but university president Benjamin F. Hilbun supported the social degradation of African-American citizens and would not permit the team to participate in the tournament where they would face African-American players.
- Five teams - Boston University, Bowling Green, Portland, Saint Joseph's, and Saint Mary's - made their tournament debut.
- This would be the most recent tournament appearance, as of 2024, for Dartmouth College. Their 65-year drought is the longest active drought in the NCAA among active Division I schools, and the second longest overall after Harvard's 66-year drought from 1946 to 2012.
- This was the last year an all-white starting lineup won the championship game.
