= 1958–59 Cincinnati Bearcats men's basketball team =

American college basketball season

1958–59 Cincinnati Bearcats men's basketball

MVC champion

NCAA tournament, Third place
- Conference: Missouri Valley Conference

Ranking
- Coaches: No. 4
- AP: No. 5
- Record: 26–4 (13–1 MVC)
- Head coach: George Smith
- Home arena: Armory Fieldhouse

1958–59 Missouri Valley Conference men's basketball standings
	Conf.				Overall
Team	W		L	PCT	W		L	PCT
No. 5 Cincinnati	13	–	1	.929	26	–	4	.867
No. 4 Bradley	12	–	2	.857	25	–	4	.862
No. 12 Saint Louis	10	–	4	.714	20	–	6	.769
Wichita Municipal	7	–	7	.500	14	–	12	.538
Houston	6	–	8	.429	12	–	14	.462
Drake	4	–	10	.286	9	–	15	.375
Tulsa	2	–	12	.143	10	–	15	.400
North Texas State	2	–	12	.143	6	–	18	.250
Rankings from AP Poll

The 1958–59 Cincinnati Bearcats men's basketball team represented University of Cincinnati. The head coach was George Smith. This was the first Cincinnati team to reach the Final Four.

== Regular season ==
- In the Crosstown Shootout, Cincinnati beat Xavier by a score of 92–66. The match was held at the Cincinnati Gardens. Junior point guard Oscar Robertson helped the team reach their second straight Missouri Valley Conference title.

== NCAA basketball tournament ==
- Midwest
  - Cincinnati 77, Texas Christian 73
  - Cincinnati 85, Kansas State 75
- Final Four
  - California 64, Cincinnati 58
- Third-place game
  - Cincinnati 98, Louisville 85

== Awards and honors ==
- Oscar Robertson, USBWA College Player of the Year, NCAA scoring leader (2x)

== NBA draft ==
Round	Pick	Player	NBA club
3	17	Mike Mendenhall	Cincinnati Royals
