= Long Beach Marine Institute =

Marine science education and conservation organization

- Abbreviation: LBMI
- Formation: 1988
- Founder: Willard May
- Headquarters: Newport Beach, California
- Coordinates: 33.7562625°N 118.1172253°W
- Fields: Marine science
- Leader: Daryl May; Karen Shackelford
- Parent organization: Newport Campus Church

Long Beach Marine Institute is a non-profit marine science education and conservation organization in Long Beach, California. It was founded in 1988 by Willard May, an ordained minister, and his wife Shirley as a trade name under Newport Campus Church, which was founded in 1981.

The institute has been on hiatus since the COVID-19 pandemic when it sold one of its two research vessels.

== History ==
Willard and Shirley May founded Newport Campus Church in 1981 when they relocated Huntington Valley Christian High School from Costa Mesa to Newport Beach and renamed it to Newport Christian High School. At both schools, beginning in 1971, May ran a marine science research education program for its students. They said they believed it was their duty to be environmental stewards.

The program involved research field trips using a mini-submarine and an 82-and-a-half-foot Yacht, RV Conqueror, the institute's first research vessel. Students conducted research on the islands of Santa Catalina and Guam and engaged in whale watching. The program was nationally recognized. Brian Alters, a professor at Chapman University who had been a dual enrollment student at Orange Coast College taught by Tom Garrison, managed the program for several years. When May retired in 1988, they closed the school and opened the institute. Daryl May and Karen Shackelford took over leadership when their parents died in 2006 and 2016, respectively.

The institute proposed a marine habitat interpretation center at Belmont Pier in 2004. It would have turned the end-building into a public visitor center featuring touch-tank displays, marine natural history exhibits, classrooms, and facilities for teacher training and youth research programs. The proposal was modeled in part on the Roundhouse Aquarium in Manhattan Beach.

In 2005, the institute purchased the 115-foot commuter ferry Eugenia Louise from Boston Harbor Cruises. The ferry was built in 1990 as part of the five charter fleet "Catalina Classic" by Steiner Shipyard in Bayou La Batre, Alabama, who is known for building the pirate ship in the film Pirates of the Caribbean: The Curse of the Black Pearl. For use by the institute, it was renamed to RV Challenger. In 2014, Carl Moyer Memorial Air Quality Standards Attainment Program granted the institution US$900,000 to upgrade its engine room to make it more sustainable and emit fewer pollutants.

In February 2020, due to the COVID-19 pandemic, their entire staff was laid off and the Institute's operation was put on hiatus. In May, they listed the Challenger for sale for US$1,300,000, as they said its maintenance was the majority of their expenses.

== Activities ==
The institute offers three-hour marine-biology excursions, led by staff marine scientists, in which students observe marine mammals and birds about their research vessels. They operate summer Ocean Adventure Camps for children, teens, and community groups, which include marine science lessons, crafts, kayaking, swimming, and allow participants to sift through mud samples and study local marine life.

They also collaborate with regional youth programs such as the Youth Center in Los Alamitos providing coastal education excursions as part of the center's teen camps. In 2017, the institute raised more than US$200,000 to fund attendance for the kids. Other involvement in the community includes organizing to support shoreline stewardship and marine-debris education, such as with California Coastal Cleanup Days with other local organizations.

== Faculty ==
The curriculum was developed and taught by the Mays and staff scientists. Annie MacAulay contributed to the institute’s instructional development by assisting with curriculum design and teaching marine biology lessons. She later founded the non-profit Mountain and Sea Adventures on Catalina Island, which gives similar educational field trips and day camps to the community, after she said she was called bring environmental science education into her own program in 1997. In 2015, she discovered a 17-foot oarfish on the beach at Emerald Bay, the species normally lives in the deep ocean. Jaclyn Mann, who went on to aquarium and ecological management at Reef Check, taught at the institute for three years.
