= Golden West College =

Community college in Huntington Beach, California, US

- Motto: Oceans of Opportunity
- Type: Public community college
- Established: 1965
- Parent institution: Coast Community College District
- Chancellor: Whitney Yamamura
- President: Meridith Randall
- Students: 12,796
- Location: Huntington Beach, California, U.S. 33°44′02″N 118°00′11″W
- Colors: Gold and green
- Nickname: Rustlers
- Mascot: Rustler Sam
- Website: www.goldenwestcollege.edu

Golden West College (GWC) is a public community college in Huntington Beach, California. It is part of the Coast Community College District of the California Community Colleges system.

== Organization ==
GWC is a public community college located in Huntington Beach, California. Together with Orange Coast College, and Coastline Community College, the three colleges make up the Coast Community College District (CCCD). The district is a regional organization providing administrative services and funding for post-secondary education. As a California Community College, its only requirement for enrollment is a high school diploma or a GED.

== Academics ==
The mission of GWC is to provide affordable education, providing an Associate of Art and Associate of Science degrees, as well as lower-division classes transferable to other colleges and universities, and degrees in licensed trades and skilled professions, including degrees in nursing, automotive technology, and cosmotology. Through the financial assistance provided by the California College Promise Grant, a large percentage of students at GWC are able to attend college and pay little to no tuition or fees.

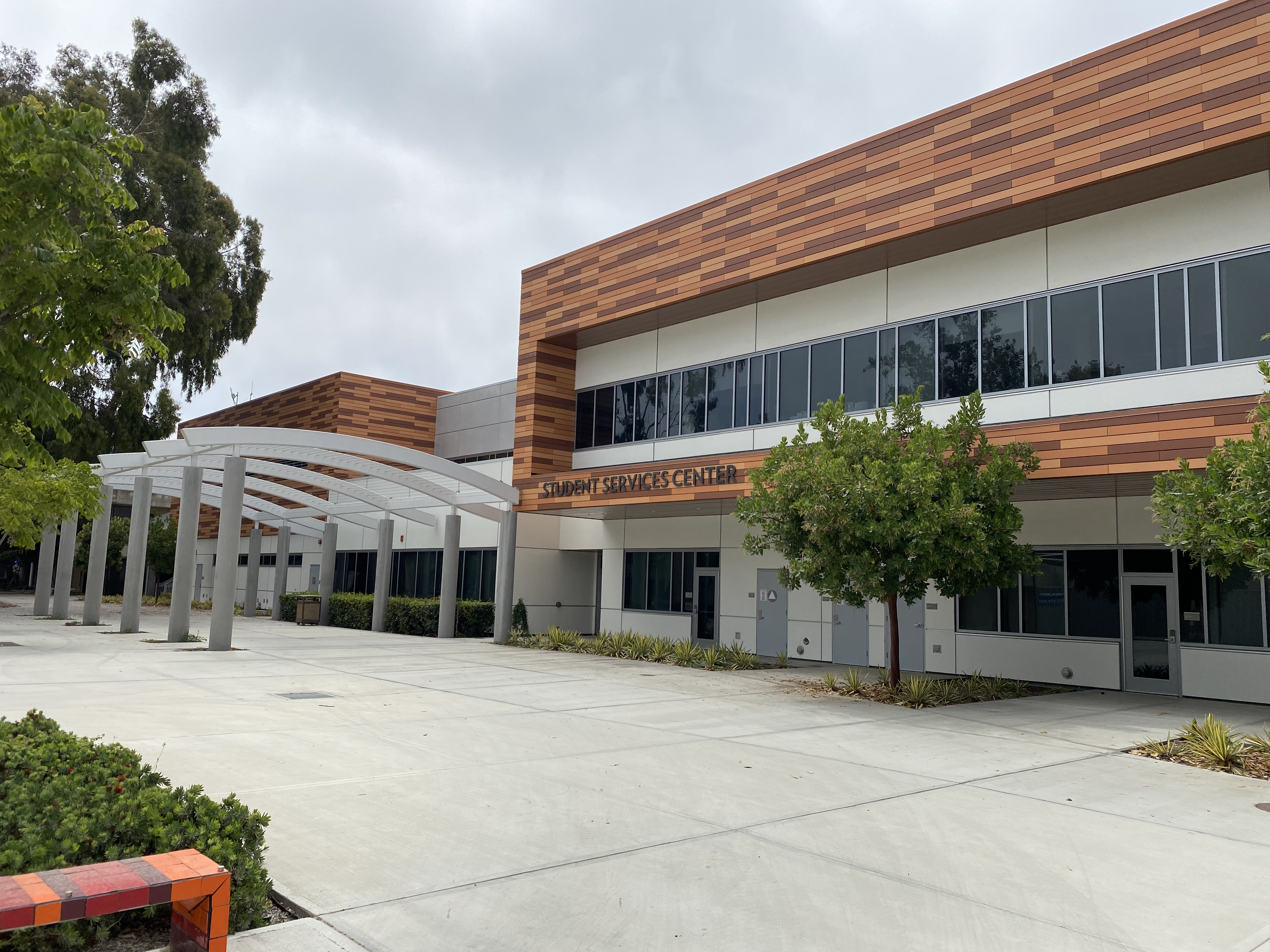
Student Services Center

The majority of transfer students who attend GWC later attend a California State University, or the University of California, as well as many other universities. GWC is accredited by the Western Association of Schools and Colleges Accrediting Commission for Community and Junior Colleges, and it also has specialized accreditation by the Accrediting Commission for Education in Nursing, for their nursing program.

== Clubs ==
GWC possesses a number of student clubs. Many departments have clubs for their majors, such as the Psychology Club and the History Club. The CARE Club is for single mothers dedicated to their children and their education. The California Nursing Student Association (CNSA) is to increase professional awareness and the growth of nursing students. The Peace & Leadership Club is for students interested in creating a culture of peace. There are also several Honor Societies, such as the Alpha Gamma Sigma Honor Society, and the Psi Beta Honor Society for psychology majors.

== Athletics ==
Golden West is widely known for its success in athletics throughout the state of California. They have won many California State Community College Championships.

- Women's basketball: 1979, 1990, 1991
- Field hockey: 1980
- Women's gymnastics: 1979, 1981
- Men's soccer: 1977
- Softball:1975, 1979, 1981, 1983, 1984
- Men's swimming: 1985,1986, 1990, 1993, 1995, 1996, 1997, 1998, 1999, 2000, 2001, 2004, 2014, 2015, 2017
- Women's swimming: 1999, 2000, 2001, 2013
- Men's surfing: 1979
- Women's tennis: 1980
- Men's track shot put: 2010
- Women's track hammer: 2010
- Men's volleyball: 1995, 1996, 1997, 1998, 1999, 2013
- Women's volleyball: 1979, 1984, 1988, 1990, 1991, 1993, 1994, 1995, 1996, 1997,1998, 1999, 2000, 2001, 2002, 2003, 2004
- Men's water polo: 1976, 1978, 1979, 1980, 1981, 1982, 1985, 1989, 1990, 1991, 1992, 1993, 1994, 1995, 1996, 1997, 2001, 2002, 2008, 2009, 2011
- Women's water polo: 1997, 1998, 1999, 2000, 2002, 2009

Golden West's softball team has appeared in one Women's College World Series in 1974 at the college level (losing to Kansas and Weber State). Golden West also won the AIAW junior/community college national championship in 1975, 1976 and 1977. The 1975 title came in a perfect game, 22–0 victory over Northeastern Colorado, shortened to 5 innings by the mercy rule.

== Notable alumni ==
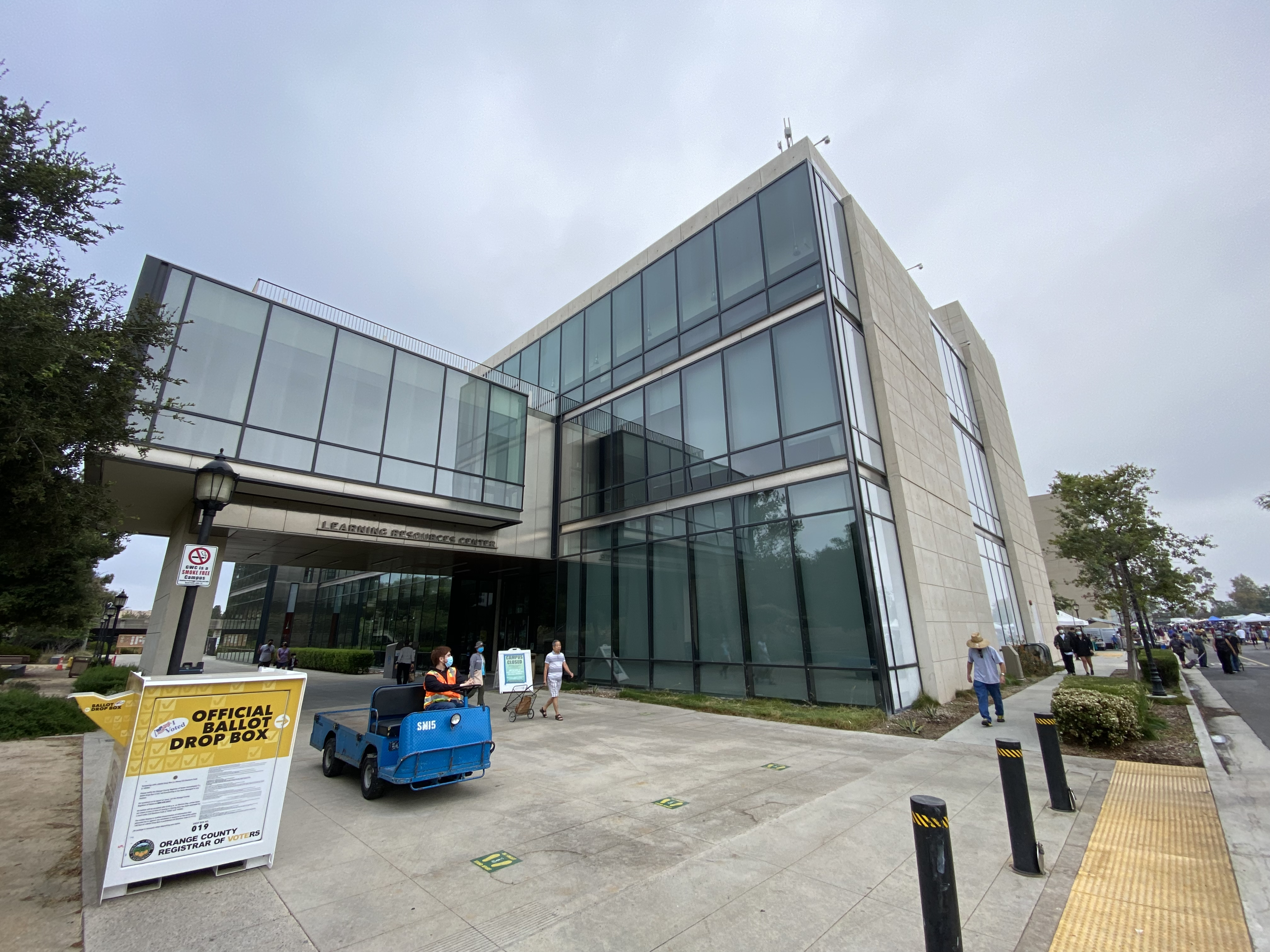
The Learning Resources Center at Golden West College.

- Patty Cardenas – silver medalist at the 2008 Summer Olympics in water polo
- D-Loc – MC in the rap rock group Kottonmouth Kings
- Vivica A. Fox – actress
- Doug Gottlieb – Head men's basketball coach for the University of Wisconsin-Green Bay and sports talk radio host
- Jack Haley – professional basketball player (NBA 1988–1998)
- Jesse Juarez – JUCO All-American and California JC state champion wrestler; an American mixed martial artist
- Paul McBeth – 5-time PDGA World Champion; professional disc golfer
- Jake Koehler, YouTuber (dropped out)
- James McDonald – professional baseball pitcher (MLB 2008–2013)
- John Moses – professional baseball outfielder (MLB 1982–1992)
- Steve Oedekerk – actor, comedian, and filmmaker
- Tito Ortiz – 2-time NJCAA State Champion wrestler; professional mixed martial artist, former UFC Light Heavyweight Champion, UFC Hall of Fame member
- Glenn Parker – professional football player (NFL 1990–2001)
- Michelle Pfeiffer – actress
- Jake Retzlaff – college American football quarterback
- Joseph Santos – artist and painter
- Jonathan Uyloan – professional basketball player (international 2009–2018)
- Nicky Youre – singer and songwriter
- John Muirhead – local entrepreneur and fisherman
- Palmer Luckey – billionaire tech entrepreneur
