= Coast Community College District =

Community College District in Orange County, CA

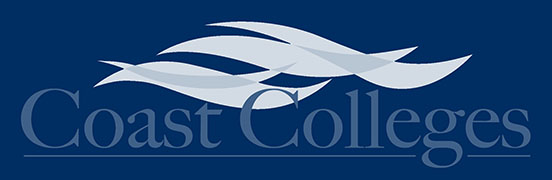

Community College District overview
- Formed: 1947
- Headquarters: 1370 Adams Avenue Costa Mesa, CA
- Community College District executives: Lorraine Prinsky, President; Jim Moreno, Vice President; Elizabeth Dorn Parker, Board Clerk; Mary Hornbuckle, Trustee; Vacant, Trustee
- Parent department: California Community Colleges
- Website: www.cccd.edu

The Coast Community College District (CCCD) is a community college district in Orange County, California that offers associate degrees and adult education certificates. It includes three colleges: Coastline Community College, Golden West College, and Orange Coast College. It is headquartered in Costa Mesa.

== History ==
The Coast Community College District was created in 1947 following a special election to establish the district and Orange Coast College. The district became a multi-campus operation following the construction of Golden West College in 1966, following being renamed from the Orange Coast Junior College District.

In 2002, the voters approved Measure C, which was a $365 million bond for improvements at the three campuses. Measure M was a 2012 bond measure that was submitted to the voters in the district. Requesting $698 million for various facilities improvements, the measure was approved by voters.

In 2022, the District forgave $4.5 million of student debt following federal assistance due to the COVID-19 pandemic.

== Campuses ==
Coast Community College District has three campuses:

- Orange Coast College in Costa Mesa
- Golden West College in Huntington Beach
- Coastline Community College with three mini campuses in Westminster, Garden Grove, and Newport Beach

== Governance ==
CCCD is governed by a five-member Board of Trustees, each elected to a four-year term. Following a 2017 threat of lawsuit by attorney Kevin Shenkman, the district transitioned from from-district elections, where each trustee would represent and live in a district but still be voted at-large, to by-district elections where only the residents of each trustee area would vote for their trustee. The current members of the Board of Trustees are:

| Trustee Area | Name | Year Last Elected |
|---|---|---|
| 1 | Jim Moreno | 2022 |
| 2 | Phu Nguyen | 2024 |
| 3 | Lorraine Prinsky | 2024 |
| 4 | Mary Hornbuckle | 2024 |
| 5 | Elizabeth Dorn Parker | 2022 |
| Student | Darla Nunez | 2024–2025 |
