= Strouse =

Strouse is a surname. Notable people with the surname include:

- Andy Strouse (born 1970), American soccer player
- Charles Strouse (1928–2025), American composer and lyricist
- Delaney Strouse (born 2000), American curler
- James C. Strouse (born 1977), American screenwriter and film director
- Jean Strouse (born 1945), American biographer, cultural administrator, and critic
- Myer Strouse (1825–1878), American politician

== See also ==
- Strouse (automobile)
