= Pacifica Christian High School =

Location
- 1499 Monrovia Ave; Newport Beach, California 92663; United States; 33.6285677°N 117.939054°W

Information
- Type: Private
- Religious affiliation: non-denominational Christian
- Established: 2010
- Head of school: David K. O’Neil
- Grades: 9-12
- Enrollment: 345
- Colors: Blue; Orange; White
- Athletics conference: Pacific Coast Conference
- Sports: Yes
- Mascot: Triton
- Team name: Tritons
- Accreditation: Western Association of Schools and Colleges
- Yearbook: The Triton
- School fees: $2,225
- Tuition: $24,050 (2025-2026)
- Website: www.pacificaoc.org

Pacifica Christian High School is a non-profit, non-denominational, Christian high school located in Newport Beach, California. It is located next door to Coastline College's waterfront campus, a mile from the beach and situated in front of Randall Preserve. Its original campus remains its event center located at 883 West 15th Street, a short walk down the cross-street. It has a sister school in Santa Monica.

It was founded in 2010 at the former site of Newport Christian High School, originally founded in 1971 as Huntington Valley Christian High School, which closed in 1988 when its founders retired.

Pacifica opened its doors to 9th and 10th grade students in 2015. Both 11th and 12th grades were added in 2016 and 2017, respectively. The school has several varsity sports, with its teams in boys and girls varsity winning league titles in golf, basketball, soccer, cross country, and tennis. Their boys varsity basketball team won a regional championship in 2024.

== History ==
Pacifica was founded in 2010 with a US$10,000 gift by businessman David Bahnsen with a group of other interested parties. Bahnsen attended Newport Christian High School (NCHS), where his father had been a teacher. The city purchased the former site of NCHS in 1988 when the founders retired and the school closed. Bahnsen said that when Newport Christian closed it left "a geographic disparity" as there was no longer any religious private schools in the area. Pacifica was modeled after its sister school in Santa Monica, California.

The school originally opened its doors to 9th and 10th graders in 2015, and added 11th and 12th grades in 2016 and 2017. It opened at its maximum capacity of 38 freshman students and 12 sophomores. The lease agreement with the city at West 15th street required the city be allowed to continue to use some of the facilities.

Pacifica bought the one-acre (0.4 ha) parcel at the Monrovia location in 2017 from Kobe Bryant, who had originally bought it from the city for US$5,800,000 in 2014 for the headquarters of Kobe, Inc. They purchased the campus for US$6,750,000 and opened the location to students in 2021. It is a mile from the beach and backs up to Randall Preserve, the former site of Banning Ranch, where oil had previously been drilled.

=== Newport Christian High School ===
NCHS was originally founded as Huntington Valley Christian High School in Fountain Valley out of Huntington Valley Baptist Church in 1971 by Willard May, The Reverend, and his wife Shirley, who also headed and taught at the school. May was ordained in 1854 by the Alliance World Fellowship. The year the school opened there were 18 students. The School relocated to Costa Mesa and finally Newport Beach in 1981, when May also founded Newport Campus Church. Bahnsen's father, Greg Bahnsen, described NCHS as being distinct from other Christian high schools because they require the study of philosophy and to reflect on the worldview assumptions implicit in all subjects, rather than leaving such ideas unexamined.

NCHS was founded with a marine science program that became nationally recognized for its equipment such as a mini-submarine and an 82-and-a-half-foot Yacht (RV Conqueror), and its curriculum that included scuba diving certification and field trips for whale watching and conducting oceanographic research on the islands of Santa Catalina and Guam. Brian Alters, a professor of evolutionary biology at Chapman University and alumnus taught in the program. May and his wife founded the Long Beach Marine Institute after their retirement and the school's closure. They died in 2016 and 2006, respectively.

=== Sister school ===
Pacifica's sister school, which shares the same name, is located at 1730 Wilshire Blvd, Santa Monica, in Los Angeles County. It was founded in 2002 and opened in 2005.

== Student life ==
The school has an Associated Student Government, Prefect Board, Hiking Club, Prayer Club, and several other student-run clubs.

=== House System ===
Students are organized into four Houses: St. Matthew, St. Mark, St. Luke, and St. John. The houses are intended to create multi-grade communities that offer mentoring, friendly competition, and long-term connection across classes. Each year, the houses participate in a competition at a retreat called The Pacifica Cup. Winners are recognized in The Hall of Honors.

== Athletics ==
Pacifica has several athletic teams. Varsity and junior varsity teams compete in CIF Southern Section. There are boys and girls varsity teams for basketball, cross country, golf, soccer, tennis, volleyball, and water polo. Girls only varsity teams for beach volleyball, flag football, and softball. Boys only varsity team for baseball. Junior varsity sports include boys baseball, basketball, and soccer. Girls can also cheer and dance on the Sideline team. And both genders have a surfing team that competes in the Scholastic Surf Series League.

When the school opened, Brandon Gonzalez joined the faculty as the athletic director and head coach of varsity girls soccer. His first year, he ran the program from Redmond, Washington, where he was the athletic director at The Bear Creek School. As of 2025, Gonzalez was still in the position.

In 2021, former major league baseball player Chris Gomez joined the faculty to found and develop the varsity baseball team. While he was head coach, the team had a record of 36 – 26, played in the division championships, and were first in their division for two months. He was named San Joaquin League Coach of the Year for the 2023 – 2024 season. Beau Amaral, the son of major league player Rich Amaral, was his assistant coach, and stepped in as head coach beginning in fall 2024.

Jeff Berokoff, a former basketball player for San Diego State University, is the coach of the varsity boys basketball team.

=== Titles ===
- Boys golf, varsity, San Joaquin South League title, 2018
- Girls basketball, varsity, Western League title, 2019
- Boys basketball, varsity, San Joaquin League title, 2020
- Girls basketball, varsity, Academy League title, 2021
- Girls basketball, varsity, Academy League title, 2022
- Girls tennis, varsity, San Joaquin League title, 2022
- Girls tennis, varsity, San Joaquin League title, 2023
- Boys basketball, varsity, San Joaquin League title, 2023
- Boys basketball, varsity, CIF-SS Regional Championship title, 2023
- Boys basketball, varsity, San Joaquin League title, 2024
- Girls cross country, varsity, San Joaquin League title, 2024
- Boys cross country, varsity, San Joaquin League title, 2024
- Boys basketball, varsity, San Joaquin League title, 2025
- Boys soccer, varsity, Academy League title, 2025
