= Brian Alters =

American academic of evolutionary biology and science education

Brian J. Alters
- Occupation: Professor
- Awards: The McNeil Medal; Fellow of the American Association for the Advancement of Science

Academic background
- Education: Orange Coast College; University of Southern California, BS (1981), PhD (1996)
- Thesis: Relationships between acceptance or rejection of evolution by college freshmen and selected non-religiously oriented factors (1996)
- Doctoral advisor: William B. Michael
- Other advisor: William F. McComas

Academic work
- Discipline: Evolutionary biology; Science education
- Institutions: Chapman University; McGill University; Harvard University

Brian Alters is an American academic, author, science communicator, and professor evolutionary biology and science education at Chapman University. He was briefly a police officer in San Clemente, California.

Prior to teaching at Chapman, Alters taught at McGill University, where he was the head of the science department. His class "Evolution, Religion and Education" won an award conferred by the Center for Theology and the Natural Sciences. He refers to himself as a "Walt Disney aficianado" and has a popular course at Chapman called "Darwin and Disney" that uses Disney stories to teach evolution. In 2025, he launched the Walt Disney Studies Think Tank to academize Disney similarly to William Shakespeare.

He has written six textbooks, hosted a Canadian science television show, and given expert witness testimony in important federal cases about teaching evolution and pseudoscience in classrooms.

Alters has won numerous awards, including The McNeil Medal in 2009 from the Royal Society of Canada. In 2012, he was elected Fellow of the American Association for the Advancement of Science.

== Early life and education ==
Alters grew up in Santa Ana, California, where he was into electronics and frequently visited Disneyland. He dreamt of working at Walt Disney Imagineering. During his freshman year at Huntington Valley Christian High School, a private school in Costa Mesa, California, that condemned evolution and taught creationism. As a freshman saw a television program featuring Jacques Cousteau, which inspired him instead to study marine biology. In 1975, Alters attended Orange Coast College as a dual enrollment student, where he said he was inspired to become an educator by his marine science professor, Tom Garrison. He graduated high school in 1977. He then attended the University of Southern California (USC), where he earned a Bachelor of Science in biology.

After graduating from USC in 1981, Alters took a teaching position at his high school, which had been relocated to Newport Beach, California, and renamed to Newport Christian High School. While there he taught oceanography for four years, and science and physics. He was the Chair of the science department and managed the school's marine science program. The program, started in 1971 by the school's founder and administrator Willard May, had its own mini-submarine, an 82-and-a-half-foot Yacht (RV Conqueror), offered scuba diving certification, and took students on field trips for whale watching and conducting oceanographic research on the islands of Santa Catalina and Guam. The program was nationally recognized for a marine program of its size. May and his wife founded the Long Beach Marine Institute after their retirement and the school's closure in 1988.

After leaving his teaching position, Alters worked as a biochemical researcher at the Natural History Museum of Los Angeles County, and as the President of a science video production company which made health care videos. He then left the sciences field to experience "a whole other way of life," and joined the police academy. He worked as a police officer for the San Clemente Police Department, which he characterized as working as a "street cop" facing life-and-death situations in Santa Ana.

He then returned to academia, where he began published papers in science education as a doctoral candidate at USC in 1994, where he earned a Doctor of Philosophy (PhD) in 1996. While working towards his PhD, he conducted a study in 1995 to determine the importance of high school physics classes and counseling in preparation for university physics coursework which was published in The Physics Teacher and was influential in the field. His dissertation study was reported on by Scientific American, which surveyed more than 1,200 students at 10 institutions on why many college freshmen in the United States reject biological evolution, showing that nearly half of those who doubt evolution do so not only for religious reasons but also because of widespread misconceptions about genetics, fossils, radiometric dating, probability, and the scientific method.

== Academic career and research ==
=== Harvard University ===
Alters' first postdoctoral teaching position was at Harvard University, where he taught for a year. While there, a paper he wrote while a graduate student, Whose Nature of Science?, was published in Journal of Research in Science Teaching and became his most highly influential work. In the paper, Alters argued that widely used science education tenets about the nature of science lack consensus among philosophers of science, highlighting the plurality of philosophical perspectives and urging more critical reflection in defining what is taught as the nature of science. The paper was both praised for initiating critical reflection on philosophers’ views of the nature of science, rather than assuming consensus in the field, and criticized for methodological limitations and for drawing conclusions stronger than its data support.

=== McGill University ===
After becoming contributing editor of the Journal of the National Center for Science Education, in 1997, Alters moved to Montreal to accept an appointment as the head of the science department at McGill University. There he taught a course called "Evolution, Religion and Education," which won an international award from the Center for Theology and the Natural Sciences funded by the John Templeton Foundation for "outstanding courses in science and religion" in 1998.

Alters founded the Evolution Education Research Center (EERC) in 1999 as a joint initiative between McGill and Harvard to conduct research on the teaching and learning of evolution, including public understanding, classroom practice, and the social controversies surrounding evolution education. He received a grant of CA$650,000 in 1999 from the Lucent Technologies Foundation to improve science teaching quality, expand science education research, and support the EERC. While at McGill, Alters also served as the Chair of science education and was a Sir William Dawson Scholar.

He was appointed to the board of directors of the National Center for Science Education (NCSE) in 2005. The following year, Alters applied for grant funding of CA$40,000 from the Social Sciences and Humanities Research Council (SSHRC) to study the effects of the popularization of intelligent design. His application was rejected on the grounds that it lacked "justification for the assumption in the proposal that the theory of evolution, and not intelligent-design theory, was correct," leading Alters to assert that the committee doubted the theory of evolution. Janet Halliwell, the SSHRC's executive vice-president, said that Alters misunderstood the rejection and that the rejection was not due to any "doubts about the theory of evolution."

=== Chapman University ===
When the EERC expanded in 2010 to include Chapman University, Alters joined the university to serve as the branch's Director and as a professor with dual appointments in the College of Educational Studies and the Schmid College of Science. He said that his decision to leave Canada was due to homesickness.

Upon joining Chapman, Alters created the undergraduate course "Darwin and Disney." He developing it around the parallel study of Charles Darwin and Walt Disney and grounding the class in both scientific and cultural analysis. Although new courses at Chapman typically enroll few students, demand for Alters' course quickly exceeded capacity, leading to a cap of 95 students per section and eventual enrollment of more than 3,000 students. Alters uses Disney examples to illustrate scientific concepts such as correlation versus causation while alternating discussions of evolutionary theory with material drawn from Disney history. The course also incorporates guest speakers such as Kevin Rafferty and Jack Lindquist, who discuss aspects of design, storytelling, and the cultural influence of Disney's work. Alters uses the course to explore whether humans are evolved to pursue happiness, drawing on scientific discussions of dopamine, escapism and the brain's response to fantasy.

In 2012, he was appointed President of the Board of NCSE, which he served as until 2016 when his term expired.

Alters developed a free lecture series with Disney historian and Presidential Fellow at Chapman Jeff Kurtti in 2025. Alters also launched the Walt Disney Studies Think Tank to bring scholars and industry figures together to support research, public events, and curriculum development focused on Disney’s legacy. He said his goal is to "to academicize Walt Disney to a similar acceptance level of William Shakespeare." He believes that there are public misconceptions about Disney that he hopes to correct by sharing details about Disney's life like that he was a high school dropout from a farm. He compares the founding of Disneyland to the founding of the United States, arguing they share the same premise of "life, liberty and the pursuit of happiness."

== Science communication and consultation ==
Alters is the author of six books on biology and intelligent design, a pseudoscientific argument for the existence of a deity. In 2001, Defending Evolution in the Classroom: A Guide to the Creation/Evolution Controversy was published by Jones & Bartlett Learning, which Alters co-authored with his wife, Sandra (née Gottfried), a biologist and former tenured professor at the University of Missouri–St. Louis. Of his 2005 book Teaching biological evolution in higher education: methodological, religious, and nonreligious issues, Glenn Branch characterized the book as a valuable, practice-oriented guide for teaching evolution and addressing student misconceptions, while noting shortcomings in its treatment of creationist typologies.

Alters was an expert witness for the plaintiffs in the 2005 case Kitzmiller v. Dover Area School District. He was also brought in for the retrial of Selman v. Cobb County before that was settled out of court in favor of the plaintiffs.

In 2008, Alters became a co-host of CBC Television's Project X, a science television series that examines a wide range of scientific concepts and natural phenomena through themed episodes featuring exploratory segments and explanatory demonstrations. Alters compared it to PBS educational programming.

== Awards and honors ==
- Outstanding courses in science and religion award, Center for Theology and the Natural Sciences, 1998
- Distinguished Teaching Award, McGill University, 2003
- Principal's Prize for Excellence in Teaching, McGill University, 2005
- Friend of Darwin Award, National Center for Science Education, 2005
- The McNeil Medal, Royal Society of Canada, 2009
- Fellow, American Association for the Advancement of Science, 2012
- Outstanding Teaching Senior Professorship Award, Chapman University, 2015

== Bibliography ==
- Alters, Sandra; Alters, Brian J. (2006). Biology: Understanding Life. Hoboken, NJ: John Wiley & Sons. ISBN 0-471-43365-9. OCLC 58793066.
- Alters, Brian J.; Alters, Sandra (2005). Teaching Biology in Higher Education. Hoboken, NJ: John Wiley & Sons. p. 107. ISBN 0-471-70169-6. OCLC 86082160.
- Alters, Brian J. (2005). Teaching Biological Evolution in Higher Education: Methodological, Religious, and Non-Religious Issues. Sudbury, Mass.: Jones and Bartlett. p. 136. ISBN 0-7637-2889-6. OCLC 56103806.
- Alters, Brian J.; Alters, Sandra (2001). Defending Evolution in the Classroom. Sudbury, Mass.: Jones & Bartlett. p. 261. ISBN 0-7637-1118-7. OCLC 46343269.

== Personal life ==
Alters visits Disneyland 40 to 50 times per year, and calls himself a "Walt Disney aficionado." In 2015, Alters skippered a Jungle Cruise at Disneyland. He and his wife Kimberly live in Newport Beach, where he bought a home that was designed by a French architect that he says his neighbors say resembles a castle. He has incorporated extensive Disney-inspired elements, including remote-controlled bookshelves that reveal Disney displays, a Jungle Cruise-themed guest room with original ride artwork, a rotunda equipped with a ceiling and portrait mechanism modeled on The Haunted Mansion at Disneyland, and an “endless hallway” mirror effect. He also collects Disney artifacts.
