= Roark Gourley =

American artist

Roark Gourley is an American painter, sculptor, and mixed media artist in Laguna Beach, California noted for wall sculptures that depict humorous subject matter. In 1992, the National Museum of Natural History commissioned Spaghetti Meets Tomato in the Collision of the Continental Plates, a high relief map of the world with depictions of various foods making up the topography and borders of countries.

== Career ==
Roark was born in Lynwood, California. He received his art training at Orange Coast College, the Art Institute of Southern California Laguna Beach and the University of Colorado where he studied electronic optics, physics, holography, and photography.

Roark specializes in 2.5 dimensional wall sculptures made from wood, resin, and acrylic, often depicting humorous scenarios: pets that match sofas, an out of control executive with 4 arms, chefs cooking up a storm and other whimsical subject matter including, hearts, martinis, shoes, and coffee cups. He ran The Sherwood Gallery in Laguna Beach from 1979 to 1988. In the 1980s Roark created several 2.5 dimensional pieces for Warner Bros. depicting their characters in humorous scenarios, including his Daffy Executive and Golfer Taz.

In addition to light-hearted work, Roark painted portraits of his friends and family. He told Dawn Pettit of Orange Coast Magazine that his favorite pieces are the two portraits of his wife displayed in his Laguna Beach home.

In 2007 he debuted his B-Side, a more serious body of abstract contemporary work featuring light paintings, underwater photography, and 3D Abstract sculpture printed on both traditional and nontraditional materials (plexi-glass and metal).

== Projects ==
=== Smithsonian Seeds of Change Exhibition ===
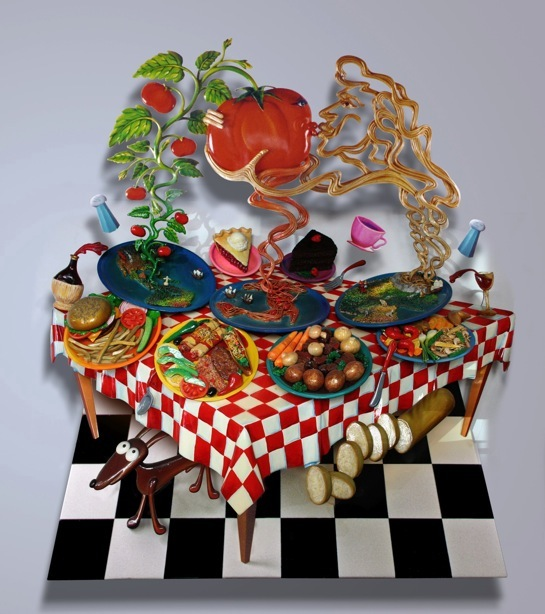
Spaghetti Meets Tomato, Smithsonian Institution

In 1992 Gourley was invited to create a work of art by the heads of The Smithsonian's Natural History Museum, Herman J. Viola, and Carolyn Margolis for the upcoming "Seeds of Change" exhibit. The exhibit was to commemorate the 5th centennial of Columbus discovering the Americas. The exhibit was an attempt to interpret the true meaning of Columbus' voyage and both the negative and positive consequences that followed. The exhibit is named for five "seeds": corn, potatoes, sugar, diseases and horses that through their roles in initiating changes 500 years ago shaped the course of human history in the Americas and altered the lives of people around the world.

Spaghetti Meets Tomato was commissioned by the Smithsonian Institution to capture the biological and cultural impacts of the encounter between Old and New Worlds. Roark's piece was to tell the story of how the spaghetti met the tomato in a humorous way. The result was a 10'x10'x5' high relief map of the world with depictions of various foods making up the topography and borders of countries.

=== The Foark Tour ===
In 1999 Roark launched a guerrilla art project, "Forks by Roark". He gathered a team of art students and planted several over-sized brightly colored forks into off-limits Laguna Beach City soil across the street from the annual Festival of the Arts. The purpose of the project he claimed was to amuse people with "giant, unauthorized floating untensils"

After several unauthorized "Foarking" stints in the Laguna Canyon, "Team Foark" was invited by several cities around the country to get "Foarked". The first stop was Portland, Oregon where Roark's Foarks graced the elegant grounds of the historic Pittock Mansion. A reception was hosted for the "Foark Team" at the First Avenue Gallery. Other locations included the Rhode Island School of Design.

=== Edinburg Children's Hospital Installation ===
In February 2006, Gourley worked with the Edinburg Children's Hospital to create a light-hearted environment for children suffering from terminal illnesses. He worked with the hospital to create a jungle-themed environment that would feel more like a play room than a hospital.
