= Chris Gomez =

American baseball player (born 1971)

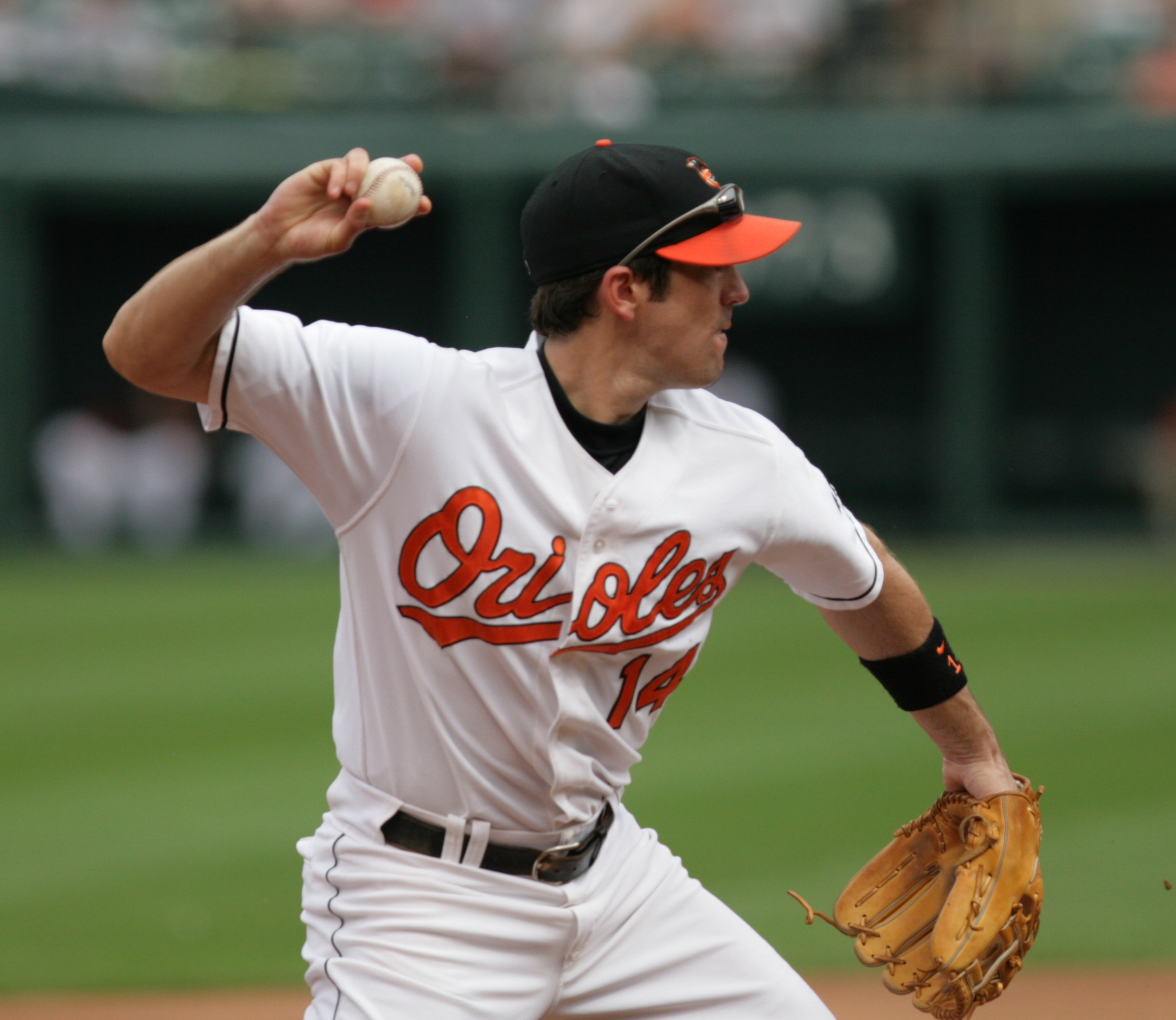
- Gomez with the Baltimore Orioles
- Shortstop
- Born: June 16, 1971 (age 55); Los Angeles, California, U.S.
- Batted: Right Threw: Right

MLB debut
- July 19, 1993, for the Detroit Tigers

Last MLB appearance
- September 18, 2008, for the Pittsburgh Pirates

MLB statistics
- Batting average: .262
- Home runs: 60
- Runs batted in: 487
- Stats at Baseball Reference

Teams
- Detroit Tigers (1993–1996); San Diego Padres (1996–2001); Tampa Bay Devil Rays (2001–2002); Minnesota Twins (2003); Toronto Blue Jays (2004); Baltimore Orioles (2005–2007); Cleveland Indians (2007); Pittsburgh Pirates (2008)
Medals
Men's baseball
Representing United States
Pan American Games
Bronze medal – third place	1991 Havana	Team
Goodwill Games
Bronze medal – third place	1990 Seattle	Team

Christopher Cory Gomez (born June 16, 1971) is an American former professional baseball infielder. He played in Major League Baseball (MLB) for the Detroit Tigers, San Diego Padres, Tampa Bay Devil Rays, Minnesota Twins, Toronto Blue Jays, Baltimore Orioles, Cleveland Indians, and Pittsburgh Pirates. He batted and threw right-handed.

== College career ==
He played park league baseball in Lakewood for Mike Fahey. After playing baseball at Lakewood High School in Lakewood, California Gomez originally went to college at Loyola Marymount University, but transferred to Long Beach State and played baseball there in 1992. He was a selection for the All-America Team while at Long Beach State.

== Professional career ==
Gomez was originally drafted by the California Angels in 1989 in the 37th round of the amateur draft, but he turned down the contract. He was not drafted until June 1, 1992, when he was signed by Detroit in the 3rd round of the amateur draft. His contract was purchased from the Triple-A Toledo Mud Hens on July 19, 1993, and he made his big league debut that night against the Minnesota Twins. His first major league hit was a triple on July 22 off Kansas City Royals pitcher Frank DiPino. He started in 23 games at shortstop and 17 at second base that year. After the season, Tigers news broadcasters elected him the Rookie of the Year.

1994 was Gomez's first full major league season. He was on the Topps All-Rookie team at shortstop. 27 of his 76 hits were extra base hits. His first multi-homer game was on May 7 against the Mariners. Gomez finished the year with a .257 batting average, 8 home runs, and 53 RBI. In 1995, Gomez hit career highs in home runs with 11, runs with 49, hits with 96, doubles with 20, as well as 41 walks. He ranked 4th on the team in RBI, hits, and doubles. In 123 games, Gomez only made 15 errors.

Gomez started out the 1996 season with the Tigers, but was traded along with catcher John Flaherty to the San Diego Padres for catcher Brad Ausmus, shortstop Andújar Cedeño, and minor leaguer Russ Spears. Gomez finished the year with a .252 average, 4 home runs and 45 RBI. He batted .253 with 5 home runs and 54 RBI, and also swiped 5 bases, in 1997.

Gomez was the shortstop for the National league champion Padres in 1998. In the 1998 World Series he batted .364 as the Padres went on to lose the series to the New York Yankees.

After the 2004 season, Gomez was signed by the Baltimore Orioles. However, they did not protect him for the Rule 5 draft, and he was selected by the Philadelphia Phillies. When the team found out Plácido Polanco was remaining with them, they allowed the Orioles to buy him back.

On August 9, 2007, he was claimed off waivers by the Cleveland Indians.

On December 4, 2007, he signed with the Pittsburgh Pirates.

On January 9, 2009, Gomez signed a minor league deal with the Baltimore Orioles, and was given a non-roster invitation to spring training. However, he did not make the team and was released on April 1. On January 31, 2010 Gomez officially retired from MLB.

Gomez's -1.4 career wins above replacement (according to Baseball-Reference) is the worst among all fielders to play at least 1,500 career games.

Gomez founded and was the head coach of varsity baseball at Pacifica Christian High School from 2021 until 2024, when he stepped down to assist Beau Amaral, the son of major league player Rich Amaral.

== See also ==
- Rule 5 draft results
