= Orange Coast College =

Community college in Costa Mesa, California, US

Coordinates: 33°40′14″N 117°54′43″W

- Motto: We'll help you get there.
- Type: Public community college
- Established: 1947
- Parent institution: Coast Community College District
- Endowment: $10 million
- President: Angelica Suarez
- Students: 25,000 (Fall 2016)
- Location: Costa Mesa, California, United States
- Campus: Suburban, 164 acres
- Colors: Orange and Blue
- Nickname: Pirates
- Mascot: Pete the Pirate
- Website: www.orangecoastcollege.edu

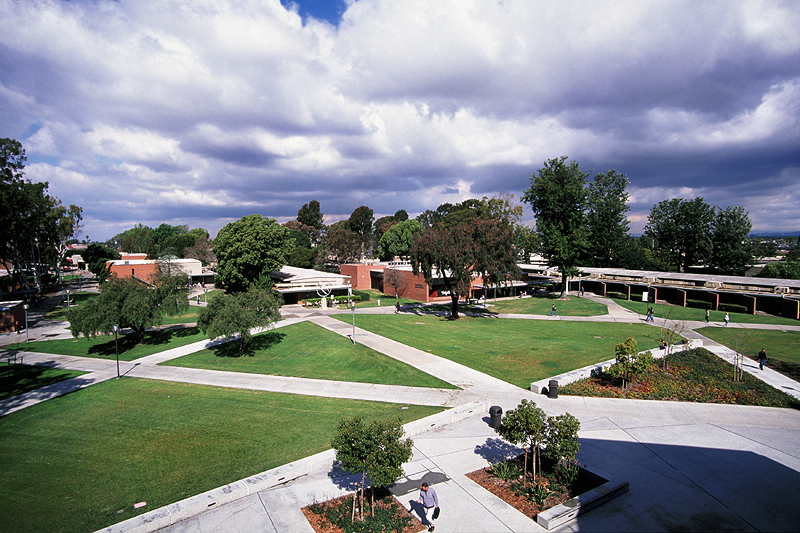
OCC's lawn surrounding the Art Building

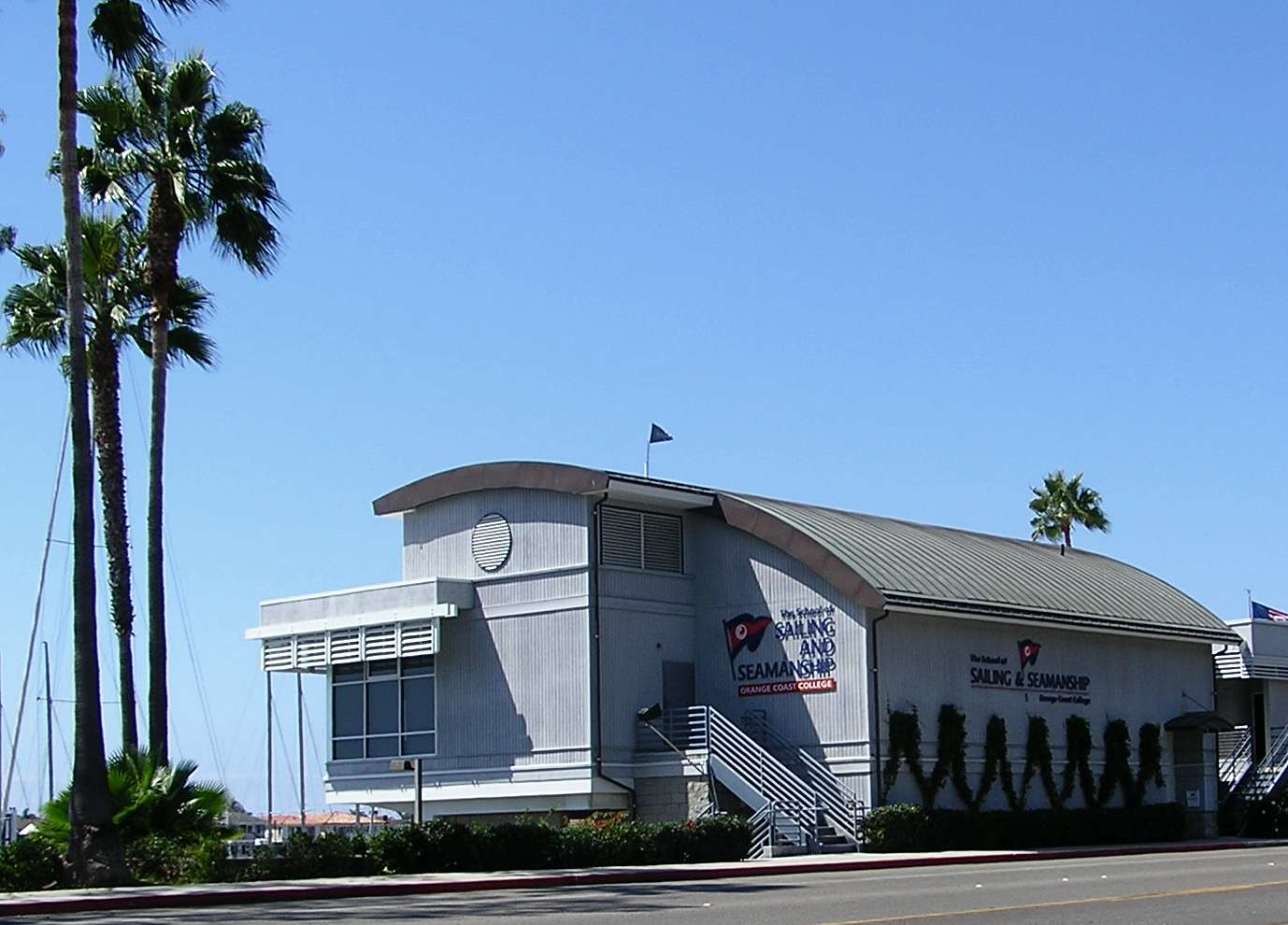
Orange Coast College Sailing Base

Orange Coast College (OCC) is a public community college in Costa Mesa in Orange County, California. It is part of the Coast Community College District of the California Community Colleges system.

The college was founded in 1947, with its first classes opening in the fall of 1948. It provides Associate of Art and Associate of Science degrees, certificates of achievement, and lower-division classes transferable to other colleges and universities. The college enrolls approximately 24,000 undergraduate students. In terms of population size, Orange Coast College is the third-largest college in Orange County.

== History ==
Orange Coast College was formed after local voters passed a measure in the January 1947 election to establish a new junior college on a 243-acre (0.98 km^{2}) site, secured from the War Assets Administration in Washington, D.C., and part of the 1,300-acre (5.3 km^{2}) deactivated Santa Ana Army Air Base.

The board of trustees hired the college's founding president and district superintendent, Basil Hyrum Peterson, on July 28, 1947. Construction of campus classrooms and facilities began when Peterson hired Fran Albers as the college's carpenter in February 1948. Albers' crew of 35 workers (mostly Coast football players paid 60 cents an hour) turned an Army movie theater into an auditorium and concert hall, a service club into a 500-seat gymnasium, an Army chapel into a facility for theater productions and student/staff weddings, a military storage building into a library, an Army PX into a student center, a battalion headquarters building into an administration building, and several cadet barracks into student dormitories and married student and faculty housing.

The first campus building phase occurred in the early 1950s when renowned architect Richard Neutra was brought in to re-design the campus. Leaving many of the original buildings intact, Neutra added several modernist structures including the minimalist Campus Theater and two large lecture halls. These were laid out on a 45-degree angle to the city street grid, similar to The Parkinsons' layout of USC. The second and largest building phase occurred in the 1970s when local architect William Blurock was hired to replace many of the original Army buildings with structures more suitable for educational purposes.

In December 2002, Rabbit Island, a 38-acre (150,000 m^{2}) island located in the North Gulf Islands of the Georgia Strait 50 miles (80 km) west of the city of Vancouver in British Columbia, Canada, was donated to the Orange Coast College Foundation. Since then the OCC Foundation, using funds designated for the Orange Coast College School of Sailing & Seamanship, has refurbished the facilities on the island, made significant capital improvements, and helped fund the use of the island as a field station to teach summer classes in island ecology, biological diversity, vertebrate biology, intertidal ecology, kayaking, and photography. It is now referred to as "Wheeler Station" at Rabbit Island in honor of the donor, Henry Wheeler. OCC marine science and biology instructors have used the island to conduct research on species diversity, standing stock, species distribution, and oceanography. Plans were underway to find separate funding for the island outside of OCC. Possible funding sources included the National Science Foundation, rental of the island facilities to Canadians, funding from the Associated Students of OCC (ASOCC), and through other foundation grants and private donations. In March 2007, the Orange Coast College Foundation Board of Directors voted to sell the island after determining that keeping and maintaining it was unfeasible. As of July 2007, the island was in talks to be sold to a private party for $2.41 million. However, the sale did not materialize and the island was sold in March 2008 to a privately held Canadian corporation for $2.19 million.

In 2015, a plan was in effect to remove the early Neutra buildings in the center of the campus and open up a large central park around which both the outlying 1970s buildings and several newer buildings will be clustered.

=== 2016 recording controversy ===
In November 2016, an OCC student recorded a lecture by a professor of human sexuality, violating the school's Student Code of Conduct. In the lecture, the professor criticized President Donald Trump and Vice President Mike Pence, calling their election "an act of terrorism" against members of the LGBTQ community. The student shared the recording with a student club on campus, which then posted it on their public Facebook page. The video promptly went viral, sparking backlash and death threats against the professor.

After an investigation, the student was suspended for one semester and required to write an essay and apologize to the professor. After public outcry, the punishment was overturned in a special meeting of the Coast Community College District Board of Trustees, in the interest of bringing "closure to a chain of events that has led to the distress for many, most especially, an OCC teacher and student".

In 2017, the professor was awarded the Faculty of the Year award by her peers, which she declined to accept and did not want to participate in related activities.

== Organization and admissions ==
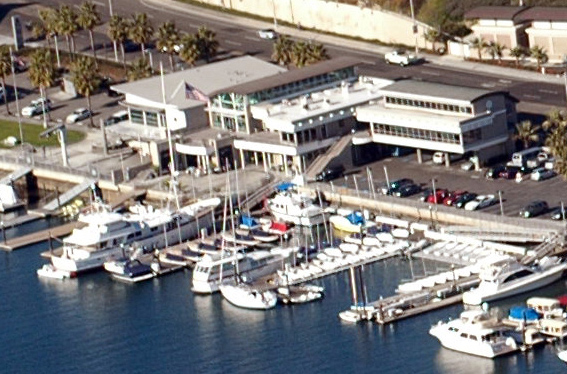
OCC Crew Base

The college is one of three in the Coast Community College District (CCCD) which also includes Golden West College in Huntington Beach, and Coastline Community College. CCCD is a regional organization providing administrative services and funding for post-secondary education. The district is chartered by the state of California to provide community college services.

The mission of OCC is to provide inexpensive education in the trades, licensed trades and skilled professions, as well as remedial and transferable lower-division courses for students who plan to transfer to either a California State University or University of California campus.

== Academics ==
OCC is accredited by the Accrediting Commission for Community and Junior Colleges. It also has specialized accreditation by American Dental Association (Commission on Dental Accreditation), the American Dietetic Association (Commission on Accreditation for Dietetics Education), and the Joint Review Committee on Education in Radiologic Technology.

== Athletics ==
Orange Coast College sponsors 25 sports programs. The 12 men's sports programs are baseball, basketball, crew, cross country, football, golf, soccer, swimming, tennis, track and field, volleyball and water polo. The 13 women's programs are cheerleading/dance, basketball, beach volleyball, crew, cross country, golf, soccer, softball, swimming, tennis, track and field, volleyball and water polo.

LeBard Stadium is located on the campus.

The Los Angeles Chargers have held training camp and regular season practices at the campus facilities.

On January 26, 2020, John Altobelli, the school’s head baseball coach of 27 years, was among nine people killed in a helicopter crash in Calabasas at age 56, alongside his wife Keri, their 13-year-old daughter Alyssa, NBA legend Kobe Bryant and Bryant’s 13 year old daughter Gianna. The two fathers had become friends through their daughters and had previously traveled to practices and games together. Altobelli invited Bryant to speak to his baseball team in 2018. Orange Coast College associate baseball coach Nate Johnson took over as head coach after Altobelli’s death. Johnson said of Altobelli, "He kind of gets overshadowed by Kobe a little bit, but he was his own Kobe of the junior college baseball world". Altobelli led the Pirates to four state titles and over 700 wins.

== Campus newspaper ==
Coast Report has been OCC's campus newspaper since 1948. It is now an entirely digital news outlet.

== Planetarium ==
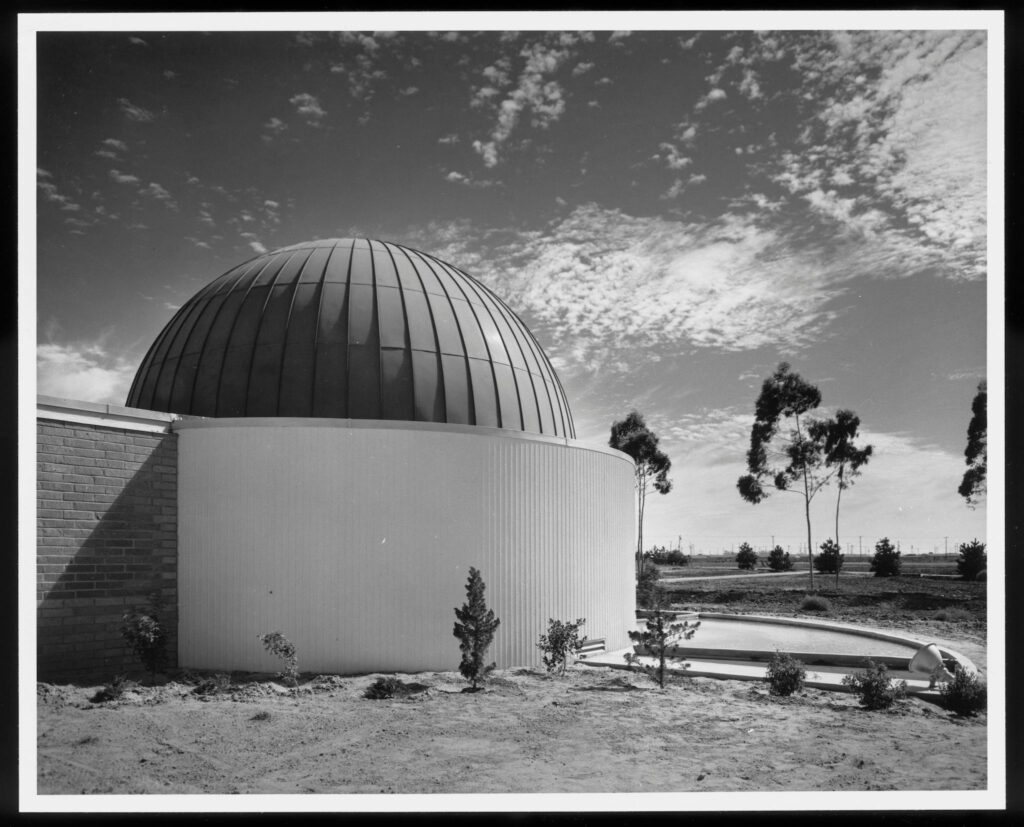
1955 original Richard Neutra Planetarium

Orange Coast College's original design in the 1950s included a planetarium designed by Richard Neutra. Built in 1955, it featured a 24-foot dome and a Viewlex Apollo star projector, which was later donated to the Big Bear Planetarium Projector Museum. The theatre could accommodate 35 visitors. Because of the growth of the college and its astronomy program, the facility was unable to accommodate students. In 2012, a bond measure was passed to fundraise for a modern planetarium more than twice the size of the Neutra planetarium with seating for 129. Preservationists, led by Neutra's son Dion Neutra, fought to make the building and several others protected pieces of historical value. In 2015, the district approved a $450 million expansion that included the new planetarium. Construction commenced in 2016. In 2017, former professor Mary McChesney donated $1 million for a Foucault pendulum in the lobby. The lobby also has National Oceanic and Atmospheric Administration's display Science On a Sphere. The planetarium is used by the school's astronomy students and provides educational field trips to the area's grade schools.

The planetarium opened in 2019 and is open to the general public. It was well received by the community. The facility hosts science, technology, engineering, and mathematics educational programs for kids and community telescope nights. During the school year, there are monthly guest lectures from astrophysicists, aeronautical scholars, and other space science experts called the "Skylark Speaker Series". Guests have included planetary scientist Konstantin Batygin, astrophysicist Sabrina Stierwalt, and aerospace engineer and Virgin Galactic Unity 25 crew member Christopher Huie.

In 2021, they hosted a planetarium festival called "Dome Fest West", which used the domed theatre for immersive music experiences and laser shows. During the Solar eclipse of April 8, 2024, the college hosted a community education and viewing event that more than 3,000 people in the attended. The Orange County Register said it was one of the best planetariums they've ever seen.

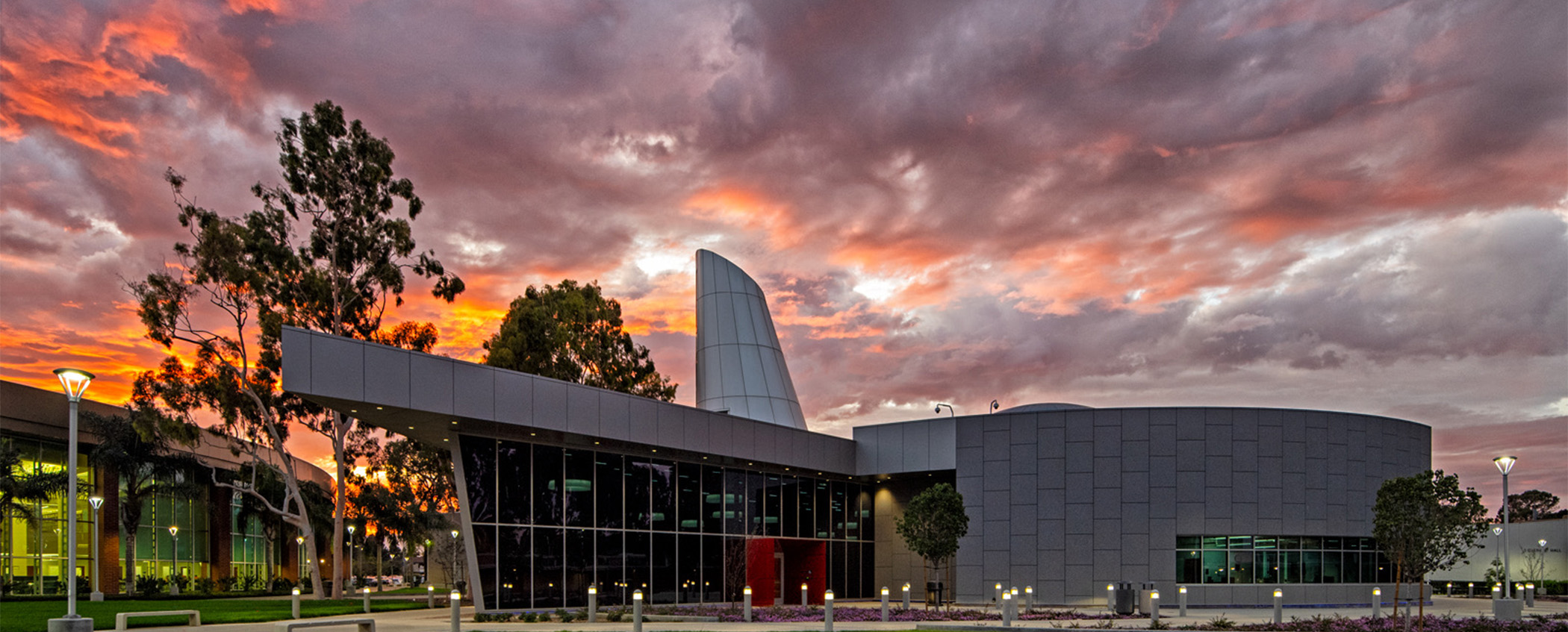
The Community Planetarium in 2019

== Notable alumni and faculty ==
Notable Alumni of Orange Coast College

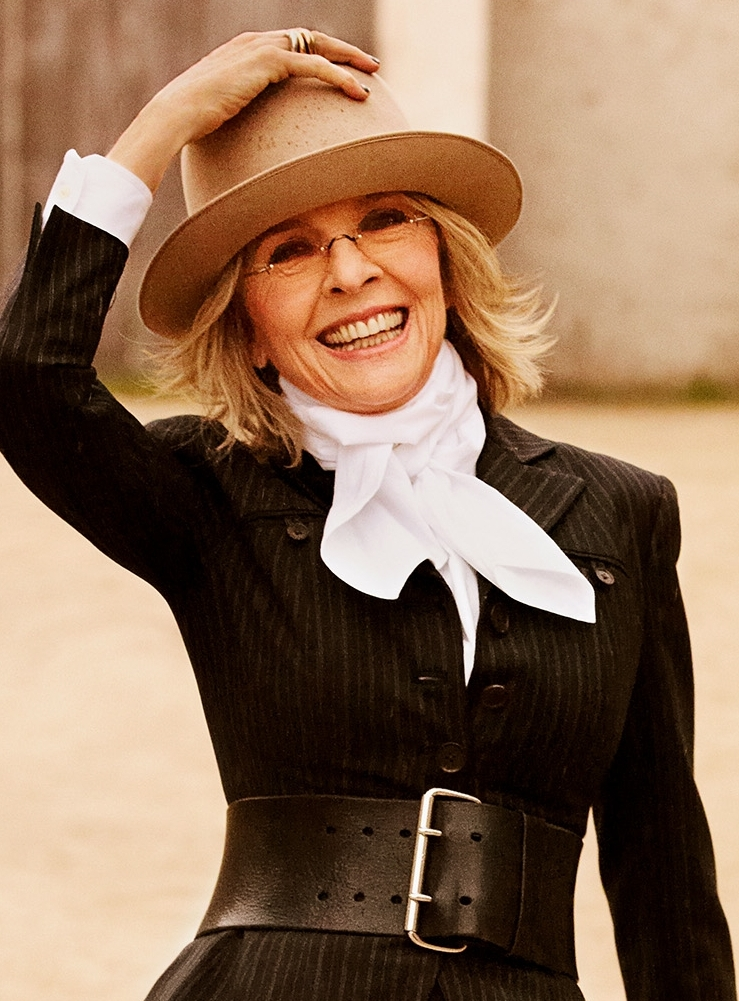
Diane Keaton, actress

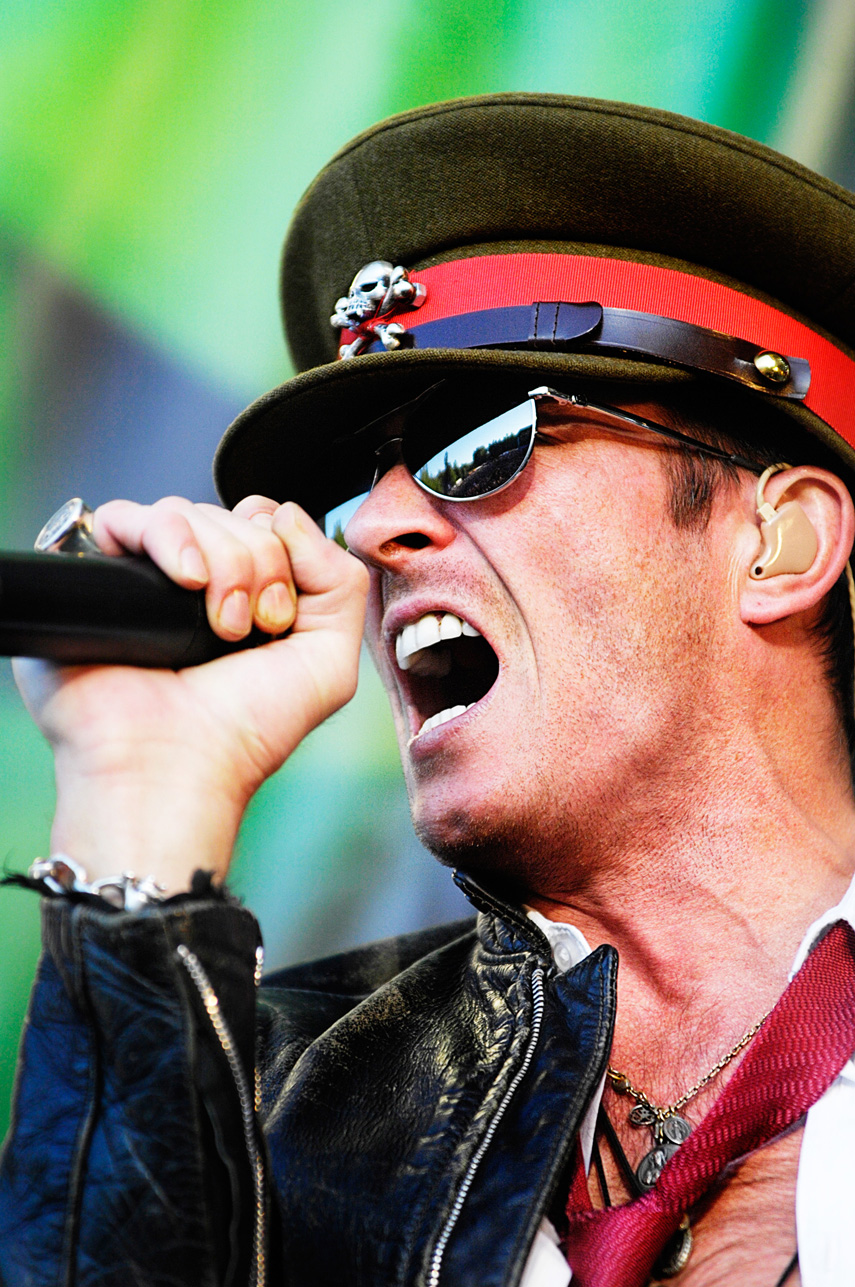
Scott Weiland, musician

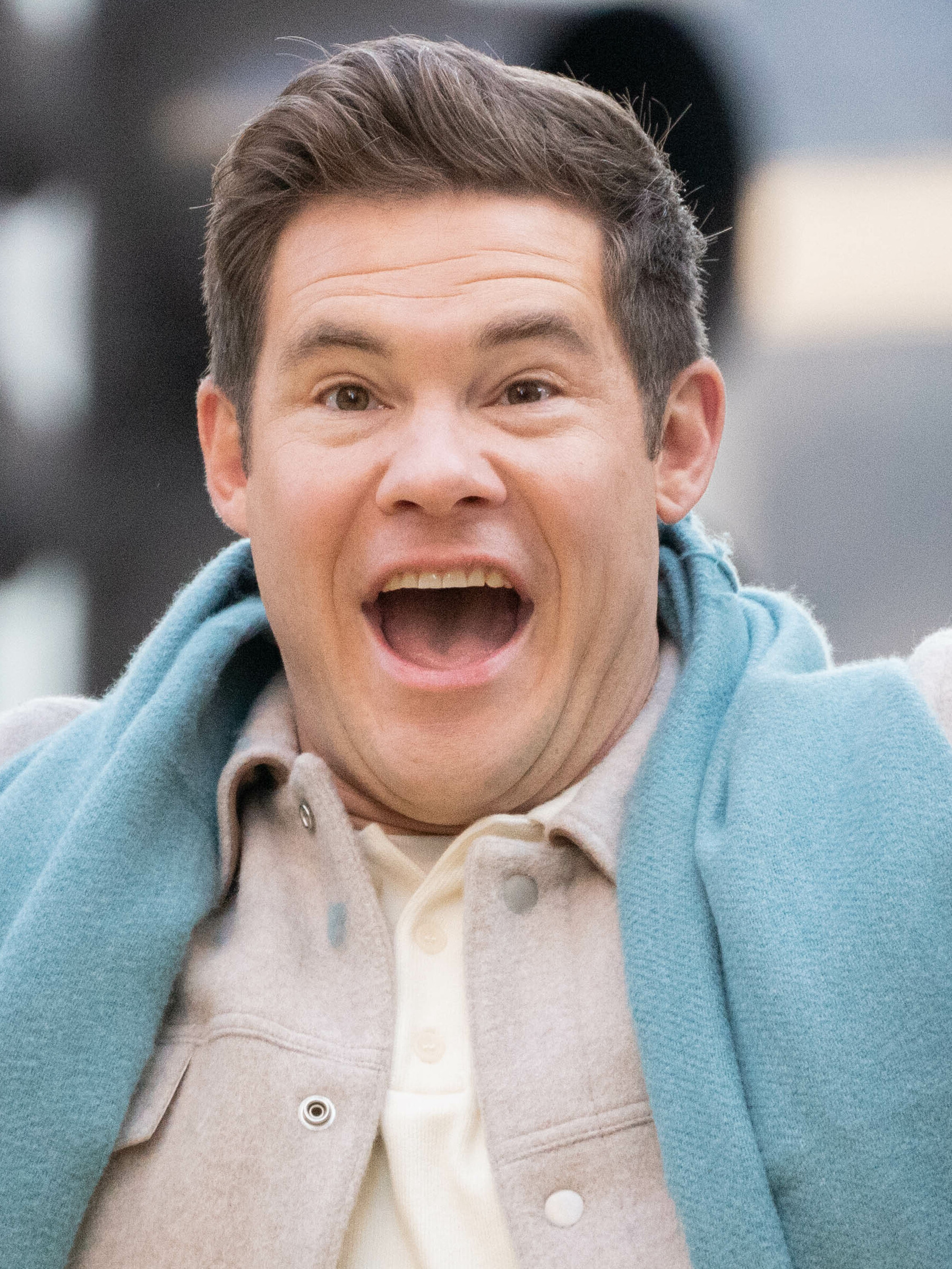
Adam DeVine, actor and comedian

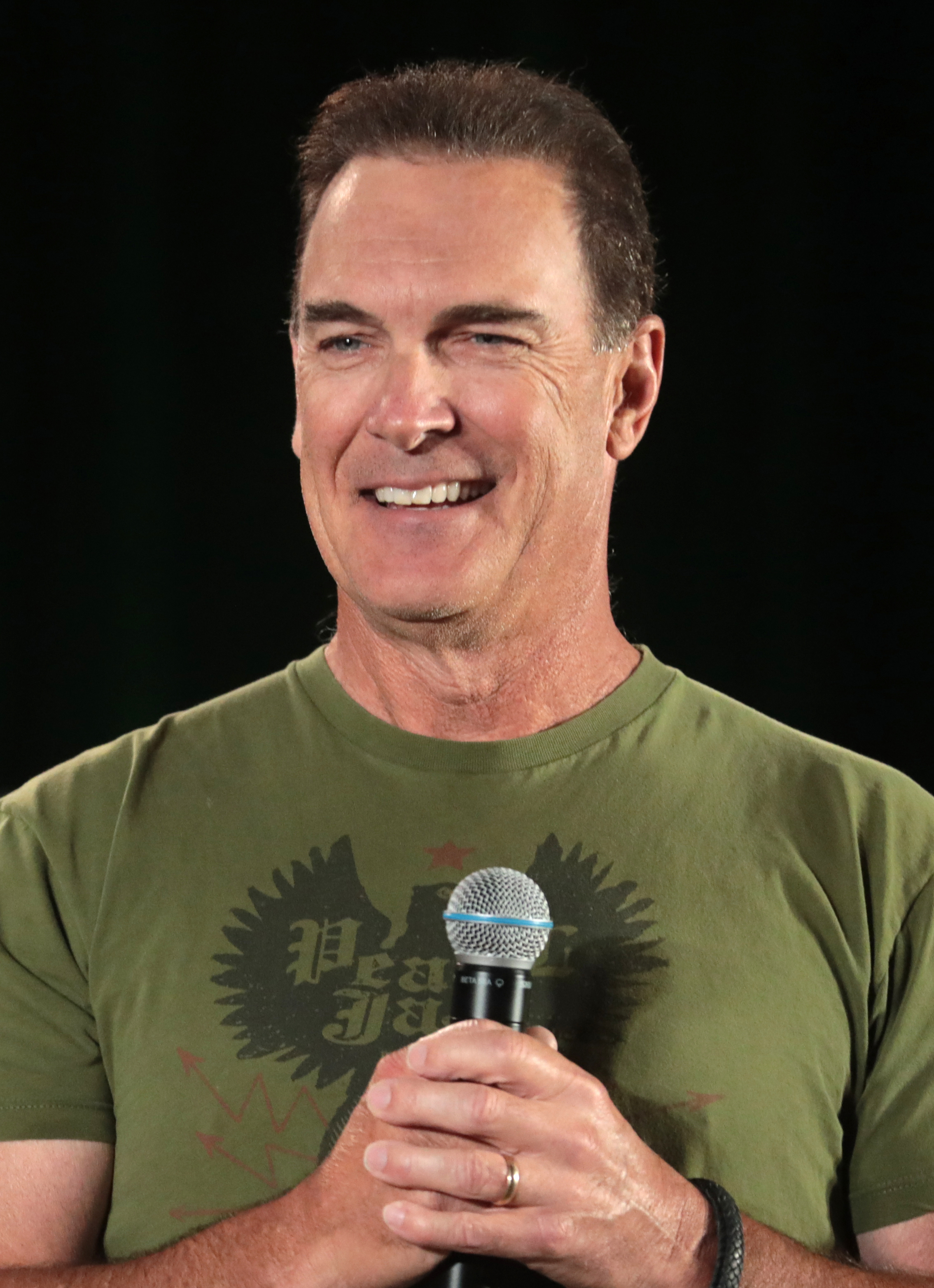
Patrick Warburton, actor and producer

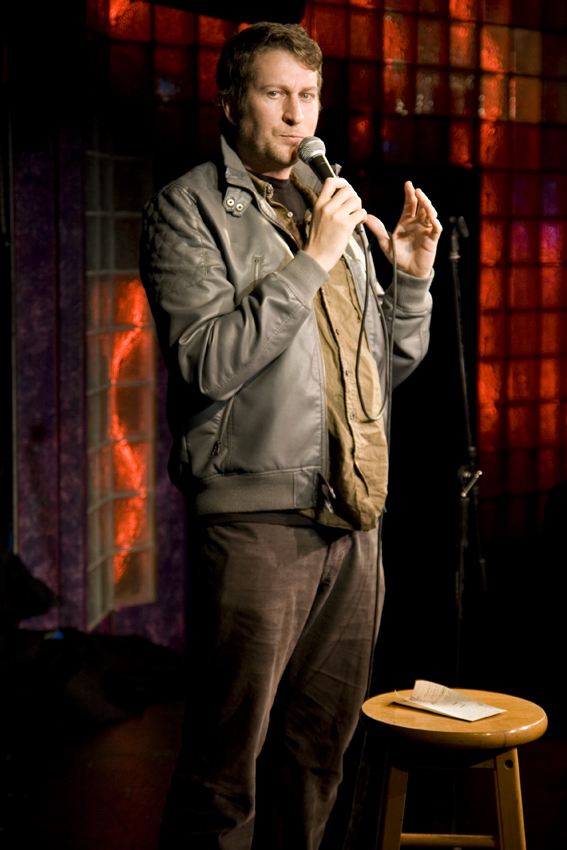
Scott Aukerman, actor and comedian

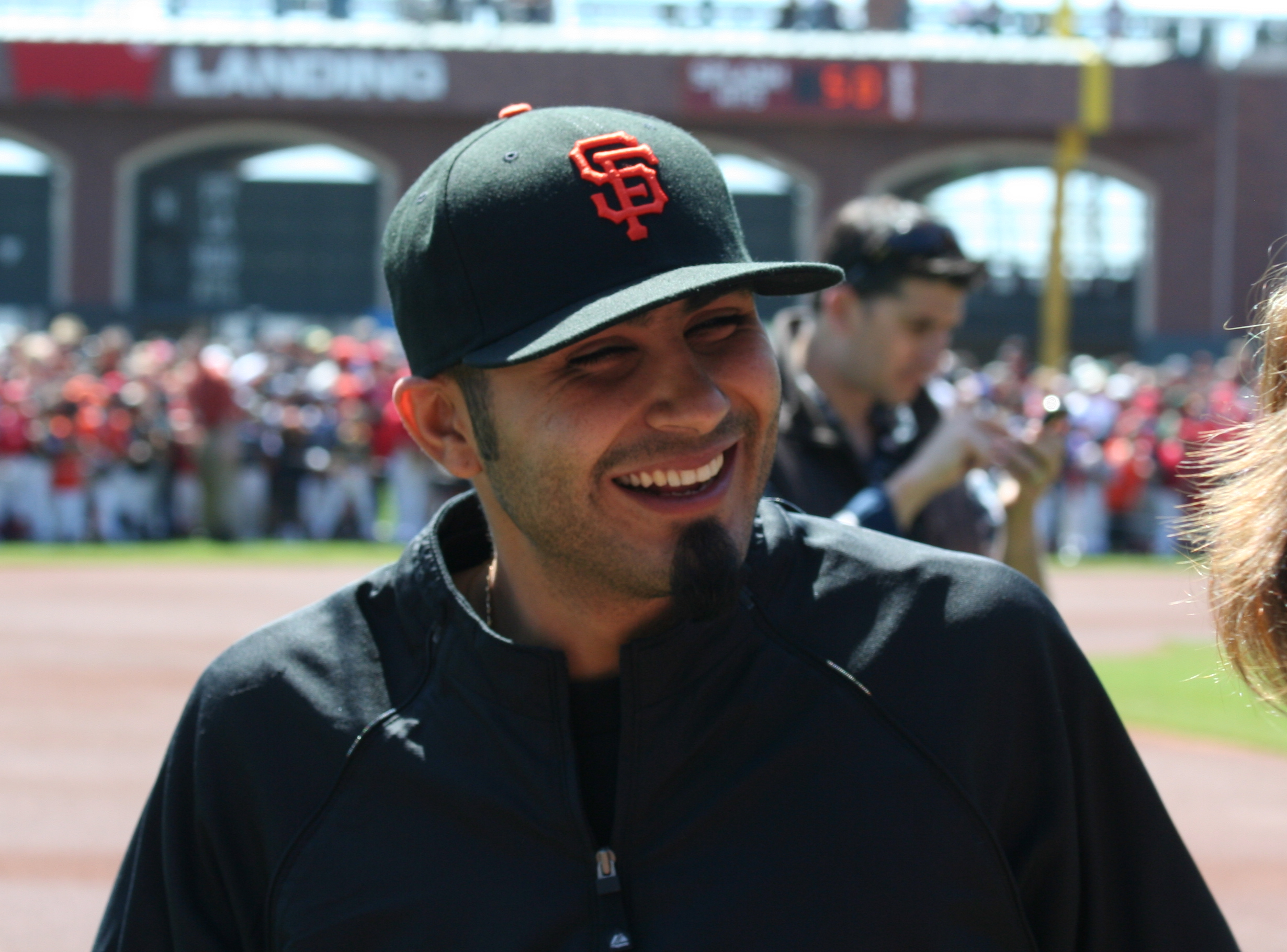
Sergio Romo, baseball player

=== Arts and literature ===
- Pham Xuan An, journalist and communist spy credited with unraveling the American intelligence effort in Vietnam
- Blake Anderson, comedian and actor
- Scott Aukerman, writer, actor
- Beverly Bivens, lead singer of We Five
- Clive Cussler, author
- Venus D-Lite, drag queen, Madonna impersonator, and contestant on RuPaul's Drag Race (season 3)
- David Denman, actor
- Adam Devine, comedian and actor
- Tom Dumont, guitarist and producer
- Paul Frank, artist and fashion designer
- Rebecca Forstadt, voice actress
- Roark Gourley, painter, sculptor
- Don Hồ, singer
- Michael Irby, actor
- William Katt, actor
- Diane Keaton, actress
- Starr Parodi, Grammy-winning pianist, composer & music producer
- Curtiss King, singer, producer
- Brian Krause, actor
- Tom Kubis, jazz composer/arranger
- Miracle Laurie, actress
- Scott Mosier, film producer
- Dustin Nguyen, actor
- Quinn Norton, journalist
- Raymond Obstfeld, author and professor
- Dan O'Mahony, singer, author, activist, journalist
- Audrina Patridge, reality-show cast member, The Hills and actress
- Kenda Perez, model, host
- B. J. Porter, writer, actor
- Minoti Vaishnav, songwriter and screenwriter
- Patrick Warburton, actor
- Scott Weiland, singer and musician
- Venita Wolf, actress

=== Athletics ===
- Craig Amerkhanian, rower and rowing coach
- Scott Beerer, Major League Baseball player
- Brandon Brennan, MLB pitcher for the Boston Red Sox
- Alika DeRego, 2x USA Open National Champion Gold & Silver Medalist, Volleyball
- Bob Ernst, collegiate and Olympic rowing coach
- Denny Fitzpatrick, basketball player
- Tiki Ghosn, professional mixed martial artist, at one time competing in Strikeforce, the WEC, and the Ultimate Fighting Championship
- Chris Jackson, Arena Football League player
- Casey Jennings, beach volleyball player
- Napoleon Jinnies, NFL cheerleader
- Eddie Johnson, NFL and CFL player
- Larry Lee, baseball coach
- Cliff Livingston, NFL player
- Brent Mayne, MLB Catcher
- Sabina Mazo, Colombian Mixed Martial Artist
- Henry Nguyen, basketball player for the Hochiminh City Wings
- Carlos Palomino, professional boxer
- Russ Purnell, NFL assistant coach
- Dan Quisenberry, MLB pitcher
- Benny Ricardo, NFL player
- Francisco Rivera, football player; professional mixed martial artist, current UFC Bantamweight
- Sergio Romo, MLB pitcher
- Dave Staton, MLB player
- Jim Steffen, NFL player
- Shay Spitz, soccer player
- Andy Strouse, soccer player
- Steve Timmons, 2× Olympic gold medalist, Volleyball
- John Vallely, NBA player
- Greg Willard, basketball referee

=== Politics ===
- Carlos Bilbao, Member of the Idaho House of Representatives
- Brad Gates, Sheriff-Coroner of Orange County
- Matthew Harper, American politician. California State Assemblyman, 74th District, and the 59th Mayor of Huntington Beach (2013–2014).
- Ross Johnson, politician
- Jack Scott, Member of the California Senate

=== Sciences ===
- Brian Alters, professor of evolutionary biology at Chapman University
- Tom Garrison, first Distinguished professor at OCC, best-selling author, and Emmy Award-winner, Honors center is named for him
