= Denny Fitzpatrick =

Former American basketball player

Personal information
- Listed height: 6 ft 0 in (1.83 m)

Career information
- High school: Newport Harbor (Newport Beach, California)
- College: Orange Coast College (1955–1957); California (1957–1959)
- Position: Guard

Career highlights
- NCAA champion (1959); All-PCC (1959)

Denny Fitzpatrick is a retired American basketball player. He was Most Valuable Player and leading scorer for the 1959 NCAA champion California Golden Bears.

Fitzpatrick was a 6'0" multi-sport star for Newport Harbor High School in Orange County, California. He played first at Orange Coast junior college, then came to the University of California, Berkeley to play for coach Pete Newell in 1958. As a senior in the 1958–59 season, Fitzpatrick had a big season, leading the Bears in scoring at 13.3 points per game and garnering first-team All-Pacific Coast Conference (now the Pac-12 Conference) honors. In the 1959 NCAA tournament, Fitzpatrick continued to pace the Bears. He scored 20 points in the NCAA final as Cal defeated West Virginia and All-American Jerry West in the tournament final. Fitzpatrick was named to the All-Final Four team and was awarded team MVP honors for the season.

Following the close of his college career, Fitzpatrick continued to play basketball in the Amateur Athletic Union (AAU) and briefly turned to coaching, first at St. John Vianney High School, then at Hancock College in Santa Maria, CA with John Madden as the football coach. He also was an avid volleyball player and was a member of the 1961 AAU national champion Hollywood YMCA squad. He became an excellent Senior Tennis player as well. Soon, he turned to real estate and built a successful real estate firm called PacTen Partners.
