= Scott Beerer =

American baseball player and coach

- Outfielder
- Born: July 4, 1982 (age 44); Anaheim, California, U.S.
- Bats: Right Throws: Right
- Stats at Baseball Reference

Scott Ryan Beerer (born July 4, 1982 in Anaheim, California) is an American professional baseball outfielder and coach. Prior to his professional career, he was an All-American pitcher and outfielder at Texas A&M University.

== Career ==
Beerer attended Newport Harbor High School in Newport Beach, California. Undrafted out of high school, Beerer attended junior college at Orange Coast College to begin his college baseball career. Drafted by the Texas Rangers in the 23rd round (681st overall) of the 2001 Major League Baseball draft, Beerer did not sign. Beerer transferred to Texas A&M University, where he played for the Texas A&M Aggies baseball team in the Big 12 Conference of NCAA Division I. Beerer pitched and played as an outfielder for the Aggies. He was named a first team NCAA Division I All-American utility player, Big 12 Conference All-Star relief pitcher, and Big 12 Conference Newcomer of the Year that season.

Beerer was drafted by the Colorado Rockies in the second round (47th overall) of the 2003 MLB draft. He signed with the Rockies, receiving a $725,000 signing bonus. Injuries plagued his pitching career with the Rockies organization. Assigned to the Casper Rockies of the Rookie-level Pioneer League, Beerer tore his labrum while transitioning into a starting pitcher. In 2007, Beerer asked the Rockies if he could transition into an outfielder. When they declined, he retired from baseball and began training to become an emergency medical technician.

He continued to work out in baseball that offseason, practicing his swing with Brady Anderson. He chose to return to baseball for the 2009 season. After observing him, the Rockies invited Beerer to spring training in 2009 as an outfielder. In 2011, Beerer was named a Texas League All-Star while playing for the Tulsa Drillers.

With Anderson's recommendation, the Baltimore Orioles signed Beerer as a minor league free agent and invited him to spring training in 2012. He played for the Norfolk Tides of the Class AAA International League.

In 2016, Beerer was hired as a hitting coach for the Aberdeen IronBirds of the Class A-Short Season New York–Penn League.
