= Community college district =

Government district operating a junior college

A community college district is type of special-purpose district in some U.S. states. Each district consists of part of a state and operates the public community college system in its district.

Some states, like Virginia, West Virginia, and Wisconsin, do not have community college districts. Instead, the community colleges there are administered by state-administered college systems like the West Virginia Community and Technical College System and the Wisconsin Technical College System. In some other states, counties or groups of counties operate community colleges. For example, Maryland has a board of community college trustees in each county or, for counties that have formed a multi-county region to operate community colleges, region.

== States ==
=== With community college districts ===
- Arizona
- California
- Illinois
- Iowa
- Michigan
- Mississippi
- Texas
- Washington

=== Without community college districts ===
- Georgia
- Virginia
- West Virginia
- Wisconsin

== See also ==
- Community colleges in the United States#Governance
