= Tom Garrison =

American marine scientist and professor

Tom S. Garrison
- Born: Thomas Sherman Garrison; November 10, 1942
- Died: February 24, 2016 (aged 73)
- Occupations: Distinguished professor; Marine scientist; Author; Naval officer
- Awards: Emmy Award; Pacific Regional Faculty Award; Excellence in College Teaching Award

Academic background
- Education: University of Utah, BS; San Diego State University, MS; University of Southern California, PhD
- Thesis: Treatment interaction between student-preferred learning modality and presentation mode (1977)

Academic work
- Discipline: Nuclear physics; Marine science; Higher education
- Institutions: Orange Coast College; University of Southern California; San Diego State University; Naval Base San Diego
- Notable students: Brian Alters

Tom Garrison (November 10, 1942 – February 24, 2016) was an American marine scientist, retired naval officer, author, science communicator, and a distinguished professor emeritus of marine science at Orange Coast College (OCC).

He authored 15 textbooks, most notably Oceanography: An Invitation to Marine Science, one of the most widely used marine science textbooks in the world. He also was active in popular science communication, writing for publications such as National Geographic, writing the Emmy Award-winning PBS show Oceanus, and serving as a columnist for Oceanography.

During his tenure at OCC, Garrison was awarded the Pacific Regional Faculty Award by the Association of Community College Trustees, the Excellence in College Teaching Award by the Salgo-Noren Foundation, Outstanding Marine Educator by the National Marine Technology Society, and OCC's Faculty Member of the Year.

Garrison was the first distinguished professor at OCC and the school named their facilities for honors students after him, a program which he co-founded. Each year, the honors faculty awards a few students with a fellowship in his name. He taught at OCC for 42 years and also taught at the University of Southern California as an adjunct professor.

== Education and career ==
Garrison was born in Oklahoma. His father, Ralph, was an Admiral in the United States Navy. The family relocated to Long Beach, California, where Garrison grew up. He attended Woodrow Wilson Classical High School, where he won a Bausch & Lomb scholarship award when he graduated in 1960. There, he became interested in marine science. After he graduated, he enrolled at the University of Utah, where he took a few marine science classes and earned a Bachelor of Science degree in Physics. In the Navy, he served as Midshipman, rising to a Commissioned officer, on a nuclear submarine within the Navy Service Schools Command and taught nuclear physics at the Naval Base San Diego.

After he was discharged from the Navy, to decide if he wanted to be a physicist or a teacher, he enrolled at San Diego State University (SDSU) as a graduate student, where he earned a Master of Science in Marine biology. As part of his responsibilities, he was a student teacher, which he said he loved immediately, and decided to become a professor. He worked as a Teaching assistant at SDSU upon graduating.

Garrison joined the Orange Coast College (OCC) faculty in 1969, where he taught marine science courses. While there, he earned a Doctor of Philosophy from the University of Southern California (USC) in marine geology and higher education. USC offered him a full-time teaching position, but Garrison turned it down, electing to stay on at OCC and work as an adjunct professor part-time at USC. While at OCC, he used the department's ocean observation satellite monitoring system to track Hurricane Greg to give his student surfers wave reports. In 2009, he became OCC's first Distinguished professor. He retired in 2011, but continued teaching an introductory oceanography course part time. His last lecture at OCC was attended by 400 people. When OCC renovated the facilities for honors students in 2017, they named it the Garrison Center, in honor of his co-founding of the school's Honors program. Artist Bradford J. Salamon was commissioned to paint a portrait of Garrison for the facilities; as of 2025, it is on loan to the Hilbert Museum of California Art, while the facilities are under construction. Among his more than 65,000 students, Brian Alters, a professor at Chapman University, said that Garrison inspired him to become an educator. Each year, faculty selects a few students to be awarded the Garrison Fellowship based on academic achievement and community leadership.

After his retirement, he served as a guest lecturer at the University of Hong Kong, the University of Tasmania, and the National University of Singapore.

== Science communication and outreach ==
Garrison wrote 15 textbooks, including Oceanography: An Invitation to Marine Science, a New York Times Best Seller and the most widely used marine science textbook in the world. He donated the royalties from textbooks sold to OCC students to the Orange Coast College Foundation. He was the writer and science advisor for the PBS show Oceanus: The Marine Environment, which won an Emmy Award, and its successor, Endless Voyage. He also wrote study guides for the shows. He also wrote for National Geographic and served as a columnist for Oceanography.

Garrison co-founded the Centers for Oceanic Science Education Excellence (COSEE) in 2002, a National Science Foundation funded network of seven regional centers sponsored by the National Oceanic and Atmospheric Administration and the Office of Naval Research. The goal of COSEE is to advance ocean literacy, broaden participation, and integrate modern ocean science into formal and informal education. In its first three years, it became a nationally recognized success. In 2014, researchers at Woods Hole Oceanographic Institution and other regional centers described COSEE as the backbone of public ocean science literacy, working with hundreds of organizations across the United States.

== Awards and honors ==
- Bausch & Lomb Award, Woodrow Wilson Classical High School, 1960
- National Institute for Staff & Organizational Development (NISOD) award for academic leadership, University of Texas System, 1992, 1993, 1997
- Faculty Member of the Year, OCC, 1997
- Distinguished professor, OCC, 2009
- Pacific Regional Faculty Award, Association of Community College Trustees, 2010
- Excellence in College Teaching Award, Salgo-Noren Foundation
- Outstanding Marine Educator, National Marine Technology Society
- Team Emmy Award, writer and science advisor, PBS show Oceanus

== Selected publications ==
- Garrison, Tom (2013). Oceanography: an invitation to marine science (8th ed.). Andover: Cengage Learning. ISBN 978-1-111-99085-5.
- Garrison, Tom (2009). Essentials of oceanography (5th ed.). Belmont, CA: Brooks/Cole, Cengage Learning. ISBN 978-0-495-55531-5.
- Garrison, Tom (2012). Introduction to Oceanography (6th ed.). Cengage Learning. ISBN 9781285120409.
- Garrison, Tom (2003). "In the Oceanography Classroom". Oceanography. 16 (1): 32–33. doi:10.5670/oceanog.2003.56.

== Personal life ==
Garrison met his wife, Marsha, at SDSU, they had one daughter and two grandchildren. He also wrote classical music reviews. He was diagnosed with lymphoma in 2008 and died on February 24, 2016.
