= Andy Strouse =

American soccer player and coach

Personal information
- Date of birth: June 22, 1970 (age 56)
- Place of birth: United States
- Height: 6 ft 0 in (1.83 m)
- Position: Forward

Youth career
- 1989–1990: Orange Coast College
- 1991–1992: SMU Mustangs

Senior career*
Years	Team	Apps	(Gls)
1994	Anaheim Splash (indoor)		
1995	Los Angeles Salsa U-23		
1996	Anaheim Splash (indoor)	6	(3)

International career
1992	United States	3	(0)
- * Club domestic league appearances and goals

Andy Strouse (born 22 June 1970) is a former U.S. soccer forward who earned three caps with the United States in 1992.

== Youth ==
In 1989, Strouse graduated from Edison High School. He is a member of the Edison Hall of Fame. He played club soccer with the North Huntington Beach Untouchables. He attended Orange Coast College, playing on the men's soccer team in 1989 and 1990. In 1989, OCC won the California Junior College Soccer Championship. He then transferred to Southern Methodist University, playing on the men's soccer team in 1991 and 1992.

== Professional ==
In 1994, Strouse played for the Anaheim Splash in the Continental Indoor Soccer League In 1995, he was with the Los Angeles Salsa U-23 in the USISL. In 1996, he was back with the Anaheim Splash.

== National team ==
Strouse played his first game with the national team in a February 12, 1992, scoreless tie with Costa Rica. His next game was six days later in a 2–0 loss to El Salvador. His last game was a 5–0 win over China on April 4, 1992. He came on for Eric Wynalda in the 82nd minute.

He coached the Edison High School boys soccer team from at least 1994 to 1999.
