= Coastline College =

Community colleges in Orange County, California

Coastline Community College
- Former name: Coastline Community College
- Motto: College on your Terms.
- Type: Public community college
- Established: 1976; 50 years ago
- Parent institution: Coast Community College District, California Community Colleges
- President: Vincent Rodriguez
- Students: 10,705 (spring 2018)
- Location: Fountain Valley, California, U.S. 33°42′56″N 117°55′45″W
- Mascot: Fin the Dolphin
- Website: www.coastline.edu

Coastline Community College, doing business as Coastline College, is a California public community college headquartered in Fountain Valley, California, United States. It maintains mini-campuses in the cities of Westminster, Garden Grove, and Newport Beach. The college was founded in 1976 and is part of the Coast Community College District of the California Community Colleges system.

The college offers Associate in Arts degrees, Associate in Science degrees, courses to prepare students to transfer to a four-year college or university, and career and technical courses that can lead to career advancement and/or an occupational certificate.

== History ==
A member of the Coast Community College District and the California Community Colleges system, Coastline began as a distance-learning institution designed to serve the online education needs of district residents, while Orange Coast College and Golden West College focused primarily on on-campus instruction. Coastline also offered site-based classes in community facilities.

== Campus locations ==
Coastline College's administration offices are located in an administration facility in Fountain Valley California.Coastline has three primary learning centers in Newport Beach, Garden Grove, and Westminster.

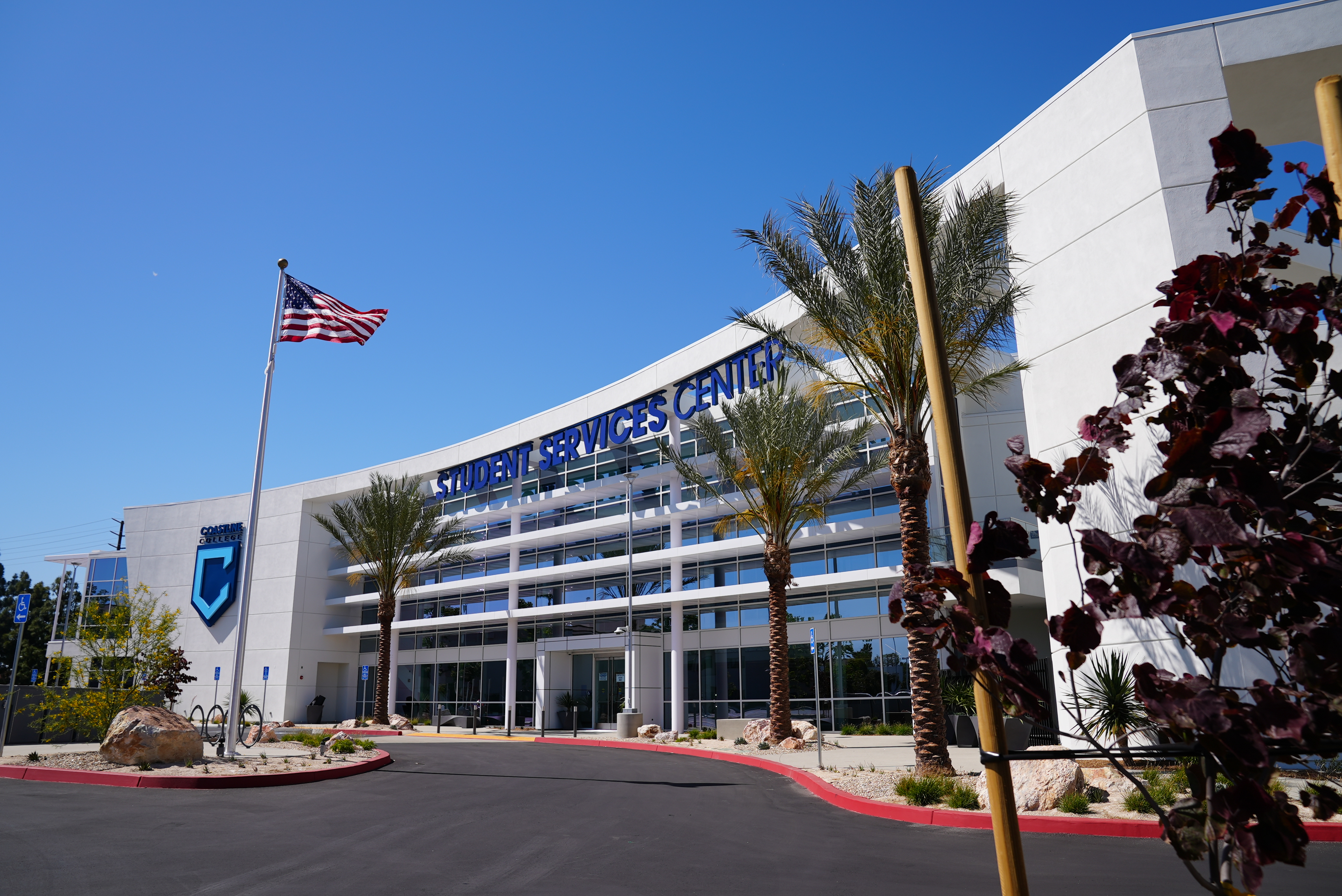
Student Services Center in Fountain Valley

The Westminster location is formally known as the Le-Jao Center, named in recognition of families whose contributions helped grow the Coastline Foundation’s endowment.

In 2012, Coastline College opened a new campus in Newport Beach. This facility hosts general education courses and specialized programs. The site is also home to the John Stauffer Human Anatomy Suite, which opened in October 2023. The campus has a Veterans Resource Center and the Coastline Art Gallery.

== Academics ==
Students can take courses to fulfill their general education transfer requirements, or explore vocational programs like biotechnology and informatics. Coastline also offers an English as a Second Language (ESL) program and an Acquired Brain Injury (ABI) program.

== Student Life ==
Student demographics as of Fall 2023
Race and ethnicity	Total
Hispanic	29%
White	26%
Asian	22%
African American	8%
Unknown	8%
Multiracial	4%
Filipino	2%
American Indian/Alaska Native	1%
