= 1959–60 NCAA University Division men's basketball season =

Men's collegiate basketball season

- Preseason AP No. 1: None
- NCAA Tournament: 1960
- Tournament dates: March 7 – 19, 1960
- National Championship: Cow Palace; Daly City, California
- NCAA Champions: Ohio State Buckeyes
- Helms National Champions: Ohio State Buckeyes
- Other champions: Bradley (NIT)
- Player of the Year (Helms): Oscar Robertson, Cincinnati Bearcats

The 1959–60 NCAA University Division men's basketball season began in December 1959, progressed through the regular season and conference tournaments, and concluded with the 1960 NCAA University Division basketball tournament championship game on March 19, 1960, at the Cow Palace in Daly City, California. The Ohio State Buckeyes won their first NCAA national championship with a 75–55 victory over the California Golden Bears.

== Season headlines ==
- The Athletic Association of Western Universities (AAWU) began play. It was renamed the Pacific-8 Conference in 1968, the Pacific-10 Conference in 1978, and the Pac-12 Conference in 2011.

== Season outlook ==
=== Pre-season polls ===
The Top 20 from the AP Poll and the UPI Coaches Poll during the pre-season.

Associated Press
Ranking	Team
1	Cincinnati
2	West Virginia
3	Ohio State
4	California
5	Bradley
6	Utah
7	Saint Louis
8	Georgia Tech
9	Indiana
10	Illinois
11	Michigan State
12	NYU
13	Kentucky
14	La Salle
15	Villanova
16	Duke
17	Detroit
18	Texas A&M
19	Iowa
20	USC

UPI Coaches
Ranking	Team
1	Cincinnati
2	California
3	West Virginia
4	Ohio State
5	North Carolina
6	Kentucky
7	Saint Louis
8	Indiana
9	Kansas
10	Utah
11	Saint Joseph's
12	Bradley
13	Louisville
14	Kansas State
15 (tie)	USC
15 (tie)	Georgia Tech
17	Wake Forest
18 (tie)	St. John's
18 (tie)	Villanova
20 (tie)	NC State
20 (tie)	UCLA

== Conference membership changes ==
School	Former conference	New conference
California Golden Bears	Pacific Coast Conference	Athletic Association of Western Universities
UCLA Bruins	Pacific Coast Conference	Athletic Association of Western Universities
Centenary (LA) Gentlemen	non-University Division	NCAA University Division independent
Creighton Bluejays	non-University Division	NCAA University Division independent
Idaho Vandals	Pacific Coast Conference	NCAA University Division independent
Oregon Ducks	Pacific Coast Conference	NCAA University Division independent
Oregon State Beavers	Pacific Coast Conference	NCAA University Division independent
USC Trojans	Pacific Coast Conference	Athletic Association of Western Universities
Stanford Cardinal	Pacific Coast Conference	Athletic Association of Western Universities
Washington Huskies	Pacific Coast Conference	Athletic Association of Western Universities
Washington and Lee Generals	NCAA University Division independent	non-University Division
Washington State Cougars	Pacific Coast Conference	NCAA University Division independent

== Regular season ==
=== Conferences ===
==== Conference winners and tournaments ====
Conference	Regular season winner	Conference player of the year	Conference tournament	Tournament venue (City)	Tournament winner
Athletic Association of Western Universities	California	None selected	No Tournament		
Atlantic Coast Conference	North Carolina	Lee Shaffer, North Carolina	1960 ACC men's basketball tournament	Reynolds Coliseum (Raleigh, North Carolina)	Duke
Big Eight Conference	Kansas & Kansas State	None selected	No Tournament		
Big Ten Conference	Ohio State	None selected	No Tournament		
Border Conference	New Mexico State		No Tournament		
Ivy League	Princeton	None selected	No Tournament		
Metropolitan New York Conference	NYU		No Tournament		
Mid-American Conference	Ohio	None selected	No Tournament		
Middle Atlantic Conference	Saint Joseph's		No Tournament		
Missouri Valley Conference	Cincinnati	None selected	No Tournament		
Mountain States (Skyline) Conference	Utah		No Tournament		
Ohio Valley Conference	Western Kentucky State	None selected	No Tournament		
Southeastern Conference	Auburn	None selected	No Tournament		
Southern Conference	Virginia Tech	Jerry West, West Virginia	1960 Southern Conference men's basketball tournament	Richmond Arena (Richmond, Virginia)	West Virginia
Southwest Conference	Texas	Jay Arnette, Texas	No Tournament		
West Coast Athletic Conference	Santa Clara	Jerry Grote, Loyola (Calif.)	No Tournament		
Yankee Conference	Connecticut	None selected	No Tournament		

==== Conference standings ====
1959–60 AAWU Conference men's basketball standings
	Conf.				Overall
Team	W		L	PCT	W		L	PCT
No. 2 California	11	–	1	.917	28	–	2	.933
UCLA	7	–	5	.583	14	–	12	.538
USC	5	–	7	.417	16	–	11	.593
Stanford	4	–	7	.364	11	–	14	.440
Washington	2	–	9	.182	15	–	13	.536
Rankings from AP Poll

1959–60 ACC men's basketball standings
	Conf.				Overall
Team	W		L	PCT	W		L	PCT
North Carolina	12	–	2	.857	18	–	6	.750
No. 19 Wake Forest	12	–	2	.857	21	–	7	.750
Maryland	9	–	5	.643	15	–	8	.652
No. 18 Duke †	7	–	7	.500	17	–	11	.607
South Carolina	6	–	8	.429	10	–	16	.385
NC State	5	–	9	.357	11	–	15	.423
Clemson	4	–	10	.286	10	–	16	.385
Virginia	1	–	13	.071	6	–	18	.250
† 1960 ACC tournament winner Rankings from AP Poll

1959–60 Big Eight Conference men's basketball standings
	Conf.				Overall
Team	W		L	PCT	W		L	PCT
Kansas	10	–	4	.714	19	–	9	.679
Kansas State	10	–	4	.714	16	–	10	.615
Oklahoma	9	–	5	.643	14	–	11	.560
Colorado	7	–	7	.500	13	–	11	.542
Iowa State	7	–	7	.500	15	–	9	.625
Missouri	5	–	9	.357	12	–	13	.480
Oklahoma State	4	–	10	.286	10	–	15	.400
Nebraska	4	–	10	.286	7	–	17	.292
Rankings from AP Poll

1959–60 Big Ten Conference men's basketball standings
	Conf.				Overall
Team	W		L	PCT	W		L	PCT
No. 3 Ohio State	13	–	1	.929	25	–	3	.893
No. 7 Indiana	11	–	3	.786	20	–	4	.833
Illinois	8	–	6	.571	16	–	7	.696
Minnesota	8	–	6	.571	12	–	12	.500
Northwestern	8	–	6	.571	11	–	12	.478
Iowa	6	–	8	.429	14	–	10	.583
Purdue	6	–	8	.429	11	–	12	.478
Michigan State	5	–	9	.357	10	–	11	.476
Wisconsin	4	–	10	.286	8	–	16	.333
Michigan	1	–	13	.071	4	–	20	.167
Rankings from AP Poll

1959–60 Border Conference men's basketball standings
	Conf.				Overall
Team	W		L	PCT	W		L	PCT
New Mexico A&M	8	–	2	.800	20	–	7	.741
Arizona State–Tempe	7	–	3	.700	16	–	7	.696
West Texas State	7	–	3	.700	11	–	9	.550
Arizona	4	–	6	.400	10	–	14	.417
Hardin–Simmons	3	–	7	.300	8	–	18	.308
Texas Western	1	–	9	.100	6	–	19	.240
Rankings from AP Poll

1959–60 Ivy League men's basketball standings
	Conf.				Overall
Team	W		L	PCT	W		L	PCT
Princeton	11	–	3	.786	15	–	9	.625
Dartmouth	10	–	4	.714	14	–	9	.609
Cornell	8	–	6	.571	13	–	10	.565
Pennsylvania	8	–	6	.571	14	–	11	.560
Brown	8	–	6	.571	13	–	12	.520
Harvard	6	–	8	.429	12	–	11	.522
Yale	3	–	11	.214	6	–	17	.261
Columbia	2	–	12	.143	9	–	14	.391
Rankings from AP Poll

1959–60 Metropolitan New York Conference men's basketball standings
	Conf.				Overall
Team	W		L	PCT	W		L	PCT
No. 12 NYU	4	–	0	1.000	22	–	5	.815
No. 20 St. John's	5	–	1	.833	17	–	8	.680
St. Francis (NY)	2	–	1	.667	13	–	8	.619
Manhattan	2	–	2	.500	13	–	11	.542
Fordham	1	–	3	.250	8	–	18	.308
CCNY	1	–	5	.167	4	–	14	.222
Brooklyn	0	–	3	.000	5	–	13	.278
Rankings from AP Poll

1959–60 Mid-American Conference men's basketball standings
	Conf.				Overall
Team	W		L	PCT	W		L	PCT
Ohio	10	–	2	.833	16	–	8	.667
Toledo	9	–	3	.750	18	–	6	.750
Bowling Green State	6	–	6	.500	10	–	14	.417
Miami (Ohio)	6	–	6	.500	8	–	16	.333
Western Michigan	5	–	7	.417	13	–	11	.542
Marshall	4	–	8	.333	10	–	13	.435
Kent State	2	–	10	.167	7	–	16	.304
Rankings from AP Poll

1959–60 MAC men's basketball standings
	Conf.				Overall
Team	W		L	PCT	W		L	PCT
University
Saint Joseph's*	7	–	1	.875	20	–	7	.741
La Salle	6	–	1	.857	16	–	6	.727
Temple	9	–	2	.818	17	–	9	.654
Gettysburg	7	–	3	.700	15	–	11	.577
Bucknell	6	–	5	.545	10	–	11	.476
Rutgers	4	–	4	.500	11	–	14	.440
Lafayette	6	–	7	.462	12	–	13	.480
Lehigh	4	–	10	.286	6	–	16	.273
Muhlenberg	3	–	11	.214	8	–	18	.308
Delaware	1	–	9	.100	7	–	16	.304
College–Northern
Wagner	10	–	0	1.000		–		–
Albright	10	–	3	.769	16	–	8	.667
Wilkes		–		–	6	–	7	.462
Juniata		–		–	5	–	12	.294
Elizabethtown		–		–		–		–
Lebanon Valley		–		–		–		–
Moravian		–		–		–		–
Stevens**		–		–		–		–
Hofstra		–		–		–		–
Susquehanna		–		–		–		–
Lycoming		–		–		–		–
Scranton		–		–		–		–
Upsala		–		–		–		–
College–Southern
Drexel †	10	–	4	.714	12	–	7	.632
Pennsylvania Military	10	–	7	.588	12	–	8	.600
Ursinus		–		–	9	–	6	.600
Haverford	3	–	9	.250	7	–	9	.438
Washington (MD)**		–		–	10	–	9	.526
Franklin & Marshall		–		–	3	–	14	.176
Johns Hopkins		–		–		–		–
Swarthmore		–		–		–		–
West Chester**		–		–		–		–
Western Maryland		–		–		–		–
Dickinson		–		–		–		–
† College Division playoff game winner * – University Division regular-season champion ** – Ineligible for championship

1959–60 Missouri Valley Conference men's basketball standings
	Conf.				Overall
Team	W		L	PCT	W		L	PCT
No. 1 Cincinnati	13	–	1	.929	28	–	2	.933
No. 4 Bradley	12	–	2	.857	27	–	2	.931
No. 15 Saint Louis	9	–	5	.643	19	–	8	.704
Wichita Municipal	6	–	8	.429	14	–	12	.538
Houston	6	–	8	.429	13	–	12	.520
Tulsa	5	–	9	.357	9	–	17	.346
Drake	4	–	10	.286	11	–	14	.440
North Texas State	1	–	13	.071	7	–	19	.269
Rankings from AP Poll

1959–60 Mountain States Conference men's basketball standings
	Conf.				Overall
Team	W		L	PCT	W		L	PCT
No. 6 Utah	13	–	1	.929	26	–	3	.897
No. 8 Utah State	12	–	2	.857	24	–	5	.828
Colorado State	10	–	4	.714	13	–	10	.565
Denver	8	–	6	.571	13	–	11	.542
BYU	5	–	9	.357	8	–	17	.320
Montana	3	–	11	.214	7	–	17	.292
New Mexico	3	–	11	.214	6	–	19	.240
Wyoming	2	–	12	.143	5	–	19	.208
Rankings from AP Poll

1959–60 Ohio Valley Conference men's basketball standings
	Conf.				Overall
Team	W		L	PCT	W		L	PCT
Western Kentucky State	10	–	2	.833	21	–	7	.750
Eastern Kentucky State	9	–	3	.750	14	–	8	.636
Tennessee Tech	7	–	4	.636	13	–	9	.591
Murray State	7	–	4	.636	12	–	11	.522
Morehead State	3	–	7	.300	5	–	14	.263
East Tennessee State	2	–	10	.167	9	–	14	.391
Middle Tennessee	2	–	10	.167	9	–	14	.391
Rankings from AP Poll

1959–60 Southeastern Conference men's basketball standings
	Conf.				Overall
Team	W		L	PCT	W		L	PCT
No. 11 Auburn	12	–	2	.857	19	–	3	.864
No. 13 Georgia Tech	11	–	3	.786	22	–	6	.786
Kentucky	10	–	4	.714	18	–	7	.720
Ole Miss	8	–	6	.571	15	–	9	.625
Tulane	8	–	6	.571	13	–	11	.542
Vanderbilt	7	–	7	.500	14	–	9	.609
Tennessee	7	–	7	.500	12	–	11	.522
Georgia	6	–	8	.429	12	–	13	.480
Mississippi State	5	–	9	.357	12	–	13	.480
Alabama	4	–	10	.286	7	–	17	.292
Florida	3	–	11	.214	6	–	16	.273
LSU	3	–	11	.214	5	–	18	.217
Rankings from AP Poll

1959–60 Southern Conference men's basketball standings
	Conf.				Overall
Team	W		L	PCT	W		L	PCT
Virginia Tech	12	–	1	.923	20	–	6	.769
No. 5 West Virginia †	9	–	2	.818	26	–	5	.839
William & Mary	10	–	5	.667	15	–	11	.577
The Citadel	8	–	4	.667	15	–	8	.652
George Washington	7	–	5	.583	15	–	11	.577
Furman	6	–	7	.462	9	–	16	.360
VMI	3	–	11	.214	4	–	16	.200
Richmond	2	–	12	.143	7	–	18	.280
Davidson	0	–	10	.000	5	–	19	.208
† Southern Conference Tournament winner Rankings from AP Poll

1959–60 Southwest Conference men's basketball standings
	Conf.				Overall
Team	W		L	PCT	W		L	PCT
Texas	11	–	3	.786	18	–	8	.692
Texas A&M	10	–	4	.714	19	–	5	.792
SMU	10	–	4	.714	17	–	7	.708
Arkansas	7	–	7	.500	12	–	11	.522
Texas Tech	7	–	7	.500	10	–	14	.417
Baylor	6	–	8	.429	12	–	12	.500
TCU	4	–	10	.286	7	–	17	.292
Rice	1	–	13	.071	4	–	20	.167
Rankings from AP Poll

1959–60 West Coast Athletic Conference men's basketball standings
	Conf.				Overall
Team	W		L	PCT	W		L	PCT
Santa Clara†	9	–	3	.750	21	–	10	.677
Loyola (Calif.)	9	–	3	.750	19	–	8	.704
Pepperdine	8	–	4	.667	14	–	11	.560
Saint Mary's	7	–	5	.583	15	–	11	.577
San Francisco	5	–	7	.417	9	–	16	.360
Pacific	2	–	10	.167	9	–	17	.346
San Jose State		–		–	6	–	19	.240
† Regular-season championship winner Rankings from AP Poll

1959–60 Yankee Conference men's basketball standings
	Conf.				Overall
Team	W		L	PCT	W		L	PCT
Connecticut	8	–	2	.800	17	–	9	.654
Maine	6	–	4	.600	19	–	4	.826
Massachusetts	6	–	4	.600	14	–	10	.583
Rhode Island	6	–	4	.600	12	–	14	.462
Vermont	2	–	8	.200	9	–	11	.450
New Hampshire	2	–	8	.200	9	–	14	.391

=== University Division independents ===
A total of 47 college teams played as University Division independents. Among them, Miami of Florida (23–4) had the best winning percentage (.852) and Providence (24–5) finished with the most wins.

1959–60 NCAA University Division men's basketball independents standings
	Conf.				Overall
Team	W		L	PCT	W		L	PCT
No. 10 Miami (Fla.)		–		–	23	–	4	.852
No. 14 Providence		–		–	24	–	5	.828
Idaho State		–		–	21	–	5	.808
No. 9 St. Bonaventure		–		–	21	–	5	.808
Memphis State		–		–	18	–	5	.783
No. 16 Holy Cross		–		–	20	–	6	.769
No. 17 Villanova		–		–	20	–	6	.769
Dayton		–		–	21	–	7	.750
Detroit		–		–	20	–	7	.741
Navy		–		–	16	–	6	.727
Iona		–		–	13	–	5	.722
DePaul		–		–	17	–	7	.708
Seton Hall		–		–	16	–	7	.696
Oregon		–		–	19	–	10	.655
Notre Dame		–		–	17	–	9	.654
Xavier		–		–	17	–	9	.654
Syracuse		–		–	13	–	8	.619
Seattle		–		–	16	–	10	.615
Army		–		–	14	–	9	.609
Saint Francis (Pa.)		–		–	14	–	9	.609
Boston University		–		–	14	–	10	.583
Butler		–		–	15	–	11	.577
Louisville		–		–	15	–	11	.577
Oregon State		–		–	15	–	11	.577
Air Force		–		–	12	–	10	.545
Creighton		–		–	13	–	11	.542
Gonzaga		–		–	14	–	12	.538
Marquette		–		–	13	–	12	.520
Niagara		–		–	13	–	12	.520
Centenary (La.)		–		–	12	–	12	.500
Penn State		–		–	11	–	11	.500
Washington State		–		–	13	–	13	.500
Loyola (La.)		–		–	12	–	13	.480
Oklahoma City		–		–	12	–	13	.480
Colgate		–		–	11	–	12	.478
Georgetown		–		–	11	–	12	.478
Washington University		–		–	11	–	13	.458
Loyola (Ill.)		–		–	10	–	12	.455
Boston College		–		–	11	–	14	.440
Montana State		–		–	11	–	14	.440
Pittsburgh		–		–	11	–	14	.440
Canisius		–		–	10	–	13	.435
Idaho		–		–	11	–	15	.423
Portland		–		–	11	–	15	.423
Florida State		–		–	10	–	15	.400
Duquesne		–		–	8	–	15	.348
Siena		–		–	3	–	18	.143
Rankings from AP Poll

=== Informal championships ===
Conference	Regular season winner	Most Valuable Player
Philadelphia Big 5	Saint Joseph's & Villanova	Bill Kennedy, Temple

Saint Joseph's and Villanova both finished with 3–1 records in head-to-head competition among the Philadelphia Big 5.

== Post-season tournaments ==
=== NCAA tournament ===
==== Final Four ====
National semifinals
E	NYU	54
ME	Ohio State	76
MW	Cincinnati	69
W	California	77

National finals
ME	Ohio State	75
W	California	55
Third place
E	NYU	71
MW	Cincinnati	95

=== National Invitation tournament ===
==== Semifinals & finals ====
Semifinals
Utah State	62
Providence	68
Bradley	82
St. Bonaventure	71

Finals
Providence	72
Bradley	88
Third place
Utah State	99
St. Bonaventure	83

== Awards ==
=== Consensus All-American teams ===
Consensus First Team
Player	Position	Class	Team
Darrall Imhoff	C	Senior	California
Jerry Lucas	F/C	Sophomore	Ohio State
Oscar Robertson	G	Senior	Cincinnati
Tom Stith	G/F	Junior	St. Bonaventure
Jerry West	G	Senior	West Virginia

Consensus Second Team
Player	Position	Class	Team
Terry Dischinger	F	Sophomore	Purdue
Tony Jackson	G	Junior	St. John's
Roger Kaiser	G	Junior	Georgia Tech
Lee Shaffer	F	Senior	North Carolina
Len Wilkens	G	Senior	Providence

=== Major player of the year awards ===
- Helms Player of the Year: Oscar Robertson, Cincinnati
- UPI Player of the Year: Oscar Robertson, Cincinnati
- Oscar Robertson Trophy (USBWA): Oscar Robertson, Cincinnati
- Sporting News Player of the Year: Oscar Robertson, Cincinnati

=== Major coach of the year awards ===
- Henry Iba Award: Pete Newell, California
- NABC Coach of the Year: Pete Newell, California
- UPI Coach of the Year: Pete Newell, California

=== Other major awards ===
- Robert V. Geasey Trophy (Top player in Philadelphia Big 5): Bill Kennedy, Temple
- NIT/Haggerty Award (Top player in New York City metro area): Satch Sanders, NYU

== Coaching changes ==
A number of teams changed coaches during the season and after it ended.

Team	Former Coach	Interim Coach	New Coach	Reason
Alabama	Eugene Lambert		Hayden Riley	
California	Pete Newell		Rene Herrerias	
Cincinnati	George Smith		Ed Jucker	Smith left to be athletic director for Cincinnati.
The Citadel	Norm Sloan		Mel Thompson	
Davidson	Tom Scott		Lefty Driesell	
Georgetown	Tom Nolan		Tommy O'Keefe	After four seasons, Nolan resigned to focus on his role as head coach of Georgetown's baseball team, a position he had assumed in 1959 and held until 1978. His assistant O'Keefe succeeded him.
Idaho	Dave Strack		Joe Cipriano	Strack left to coach Michigan.
Michigan	William Perigo		Dave Strack	
San Francisco	Ross Giudice		Pete Peletta	
San Jose State	Walt McPherson		Stu Inman	
Seton Hall	Honey Russell		Richie Regan	
Tulsa	Clarence Iba		Joe Swank	
West Virginia	Fred Schaus		George King	
