= 1959–60 NCAA University Division men's basketball rankings =

- Season: 1959–60
- NCAA Tournament: 1960
- NCAA Tournament Champions: Ohio State
NCAA University Division men's basketball rankings


The 1959–60 NCAA men's basketball rankings was made up of two human polls, the AP Poll and the Coaches Poll.

== Legend ==
	Increase in ranking
	Decrease in ranking
	New to rankings from previous week
Italics	Number of first place votes
(#–#)	Win–loss record
т	Tied with team above or below also with this symbol

== AP Poll ==
	Week 1 Dec. 22	Week 2 Dec. 29	Week 3 Jan. 5	Week 4 Jan. 12	Week 5 Jan. 19	Week 6 Jan. 26	Week 7 Feb. 2	Week 8 Feb. 9	Week 9 Feb. 16	Week 10 Feb. 23	Week 11 Mar. 1	Final Mar. 8	
1.	Cincinnati (5–0)	Cincinnati (7–0)	Cincinnati (10–0)	Cincinnati (12–0)	Cincinnati (13–1)	Cincinnati (14–1)	Cincinnati (15–1)	Cincinnati (17–1)	Cincinnati (19–1)	Cincinnati (20–1)	Cincinnati (22–1)	Cincinnati (24–1)	1.
2.	West Virginia (8–0)	West Virginia (8–0)	California (9–1)	California (12–1)	Bradley (12–1)	Bradley (13–1)	Bradley (14–1)	Bradley (17–1)	Bradley (19–1)	Ohio State (19–2)	Ohio State (20–2)	California (24–1)	2.
3.	Ohio State (6–0)	California (6–0)	West Virginia (10–1)	West Virginia (12–1)	California (14–1)	California (14–1)	California (16–1)	California (17–1)	California (19–1)	Bradley (21–1)	California (22–1)	Ohio State (21–3)	3.
4.	California (5–0)	Utah (8–0)	Bradley (8–1)	Bradley (10–1)	West Virginia (15–1)	West Virginia (15–1)	Ohio State (13–2)	Ohio State (15–2)	Ohio State (17–2)	California (20–1)	Bradley (22–2)	Bradley (24–2)	4.
5.	Bradley (6–0)	Ohio State (7–1)	Utah (10–1)	Ohio State (9–2)	Ohio State (11–2)	Ohio State (12–2)	West Virginia (16–2)	West Virginia (18–2)	West Virginia (20–3)	Utah (20–2)	West Virginia (24–4)	West Virginia (24–4)	5.
6.	Utah (6–0)	Saint Louis (8–2)	Georgia Tech (9–1)	Georgia Tech (10–1)	Georgia Tech (13–1)	Georgia Tech (14–2)	Georgia Tech (16–2)	Georgia Tech (17–3)	Georgia Tech (19–3)	Georgia Tech (20–4)	Utah (22–2)	Utah (24–2)	6.
7.	Saint Louis (6–2)	Indiana (6–1)	Ohio State (7–2)	Utah (11–2)	Utah (13–2)	Utah (14–2)	Utah (15–2)	Utah State (17–2)	Utah State (18–2)	West Virginia (21–4)	Georgia Tech (21–5)	Indiana (20–4)	7.
8.	Georgia Tech (6–0)	Illinois (5–0)	Wake Forest (7–2)	Texas A&M (10–0)	Villanova (10–1)	Villanova (12–1)	Villanova (14–1)	Villanova (16–1)	Utah (18–2)	Utah State (19–3)	Miami (FL) (23–3)	Utah State (22–5)	8.
9.	Indiana (4–1)	Bradley (6–1)	Illinois (7–1)	Villanova (9–0)	Utah State (13–2)	Utah State (14–2)	Utah State (15–2)	Utah (17–2)	Villanova (17–2)	Miami (FL) (21–3)	St. Bonaventure (17–3)	St. Bonaventure (19–3)	9.
10.	Illinois (4–0)	Georgia Tech (7–1)	USC (8–3)	USC (10–4)	Texas A&M (11–1)	Texas A&M (12–1)	Texas A&M (12–1)	Miami (FL) (20–2)	Miami (FL) (20–3)	St. Bonaventure (15–3)	Utah State (20–4)	Miami (FL) (23–3)	10.
11.	Michigan State (4–0)	Detroit (7–1)	Indiana (8–2)	Saint Louis (10–3)	Miami (FL) (15–1)	Miami (FL) (15–2)	Miami (FL) (16–2)	Toledo (15–2)	Texas A&M (16–2)	St. John's (16–5)	Auburn (19–3)	Auburn (19–3)	11.
12.	NYU (5–0)	NYU (6–0)	Saint Louis (8–3)	Utah State (11–2)	North Carolina (9–3)	North Carolina (9–3)	Toledo (13–2)	Texas A&M (14–2)	Toledo (17–2)	Villanova (17–3)	Indiana (18–4)	NYU (19–3)	12.
13.	Kentucky (4–3)	Kentucky (5–3)	Texas A&M (8–0)	Wake Forest (8–3)	Illinois (10–2)	Toledo (11–2)	Dayton (15–3)	North Carolina (10–3)	Holy Cross (15–2)	Auburn (17–3)	Saint Louis (17–6)	Georgia Tech (21–5)	13.
14.	La Salle (6–0)	Iowa (7–1)	Miami (FL) (11–1)	Illinois (8–2)	USC (11–5)	Detroit (13–2)	Detroit (14–2)	Providence (13–3)	St. Bonaventure (13–3)	NYU (15–3)	NYU (17–3)	Providence (21–4)	14.
15.	Villanova (6–0)	Miami (FL) (6–0)	Detroit (9–1)	Miami (FL) (12–1)	Iowa (12–3)	Kentucky (10–4)	Kansas State (11–5)	Dayton (16–3)	St. John's (14–5)	Providence (18–4)	Providence (19–4)	Saint Louis (18–7)	15.
16.	Duke (4–1)	Toledo (4–1)	Villanova (7–0)	North Carolina (7–3)	Kentucky (10–4)	Saint Louis (10–5)	Providence (10–3)	Holy Cross (13–2)	Providence (14–4)	Saint Louis (17–6)	North Carolina (17–5)	Holy Cross (20–5)	16.
17.	Detroit (6–1)	Villanova (6–0)	Utah State (10–2)	Kentucky (8–4)	Toledo (10–2)	Virginia Tech (11–2)	North Carolina (9–3)	Auburn (13–3)	Auburn (15–3)	Holy Cross (17–3)	Villanova (18–5)	Villanova (19–5)	17.
18.	Texas A&M (5–0)	Duke (8–1)	Western Kentucky (7–1)	Toledo (8–1)	Saint Louis (10–5)	USC (11–5)	Saint Louis (11–5)	Saint Louis (13–5)	Ohio (13–4)	Texas A&M (17–3)	Wake Forest (19–6)	Duke (15–10)	18.
19.	Iowa (5–1)	Wake Forest (4–1)	North Carolina (6–3)	La Salle (8–0)	Dayton (12–3)	Dayton (13–3)	Illinois (11–3) т	Detroit (15–3)	North Carolina (12–4)	Toledo (17–4)	St. John's (17–6)	Wake Forest (21–7)	19.
20.	USC (3–2)	DePaul (6–0)	Toledo (7–1)	Detroit (10–2)	Detroit (12–2)	Providence (10–3) т Wake Forest (11–4) т	St. Bonaventure (11–3) т	Illinois (12–3)	Illinois (13–4)	Indiana (16–4)	Holy Cross (17–5)	St. John's (17–7)	20.
	Week 1 Dec. 22	Week 2 Dec. 29	Week 3 Jan. 5	Week 4 Jan. 12	Week 5 Jan. 19	Week 6 Jan. 26	Week 7 Feb. 2	Week 8 Feb. 9	Week 9 Feb. 16	Week 10 Feb. 23	Week 11 Mar. 1	Final Mar. 8	
		Dropped: Michigan State (4–2); La Salle; Texas A&M (5–0); USC (6–2)	Dropped: NYU; Kentucky (6–4); Iowa (8–3); Duke; DePaul	Dropped: Indiana (8–4); Western Kentucky	Dropped: Wake Forest; La Salle	Dropped: Illinois; Iowa (13–3)	Dropped: Kentucky; Virginia Tech; USC; Wake Forest	Dropped: Kansas State (11–6); St. Bonaventure (11–3)	Dropped: Dayton (16–4); Saint Louis (14–6); Detroit	Dropped: Ohio; North Carolina (14–5); Illinois	Dropped: Texas A&M (17–5); Toledo	Dropped: North Carolina (18–6)	

== UP Poll ==
	Week 1 Dec. 8	Week 2 Dec. 14	Week 3 Dec. 21	Week 4 Dec. 28	Week 5 Jan. 5	Week 6 Jan. 12	Week 7 Jan. 19	Week 8 Jan. 26	Week 9 Feb. 2	Week 10 Feb. 9	Week 11 Feb. 16	Week 12 Feb. 23	Week 13 Mar. 1	Final Mar. 8	
1.	Cincinnati (2–0)	Cincinnati (4–0)	Cincinnati (5–0)	Cincinnati (7–0)	Cincinnati (10–0)	Cincinnati (12–0)	Cincinnati (13–1)	Cincinnati (14–1)	California (16–1)	California (17–1)	California (19–1)	California (20–1)	California (22–1)	California (24–1)	1.
2.	California (1–0)	Ohio State (5–0)	West Virginia (8–0)	West Virginia (8–0)	California (9–1)	California (12–1)	California (14–1)	California (14–1)	Cincinnati (15–1)	Cincinnati (17–1)	Cincinnati (19–1)	Cincinnati (20–1)	Cincinnati (22–1)	Cincinnati (24–1)	2.
3.	West Virginia (3–0)	West Virginia (5–0)	Ohio State (6–0)	California (6–0)	West Virginia (10–1)	West Virginia (12–1)	West Virginia (15–1)	West Virginia (15–1)	Bradley (14–1)	Bradley (17–1)	Ohio State (17–2)	Ohio State (19–2)	Ohio State (20–2)	Ohio State (21–3)	3.
4.	Ohio State (3–0)	California (3–0)	California (5–0)	Ohio State (7–1)	Bradley (8–1)	Ohio State (9–2)	Bradley (12–1)	Bradley (13–1)	Ohio State (13–2)	Ohio State (15–2)	Bradley (19–1)	Bradley (21–1)	Bradley (22–2)	Bradley (24–2)	4.
5.	North Carolina (1–0)	North Carolina (3–0)	Saint Louis (6–2)	Utah (8–0)	Ohio State (7–2)	Bradley (10–1)	Ohio State (11–2)	Ohio State (12–2)	West Virginia (16–2)	West Virginia (18–2)	West Virginia (20–3)	Utah (20–2)	Utah (22–2)	Utah (24–2)	5.
6.	Kentucky (2–1)	Saint Louis (4–1)	Utah (6–0)	Saint Louis (8–2)	Utah (10–1)	Georgia Tech (10–1)	Georgia Tech (13–1)	Georgia Tech (14–2)	Georgia Tech (16–2)	Villanova (16–1)	Utah (18–2)	West Virginia (21–4)	West Virginia (24–4)	West Virginia (24–4)	6.
7.	Saint Louis (3–0)	Utah (4–0)	Bradley (6–0)	Bradley (6–1)	USC (8–3)	Texas A&M (10–0)	Utah (13–2)	Villanova (12–1)	Villanova (14–1)	Utah (17–2)	Utah State (18–2)	Utah State (19–3)	Utah State (20–4)	Utah State (22–5)	7.
8.	Indiana (1–0)	Bradley (3–0)	Georgia Tech (6–0)	Indiana (6–1)	Georgia Tech (9–1)	USC (10–4)	Texas A&M (11–1)	Utah (14–2)	Utah (15–2)	Georgia Tech (17–3)	Georgia Tech (19–3)	Georgia Tech (20–4)	Georgia Tech (21–5)	Georgia Tech (21–5)	8.
9.	Kansas (1–0)	Kansas (3–1)	Kansas (5–3)	Illinois (5–0)	Saint Louis (8–3)	Utah (11–2)	Villanova (10–1)	Texas A&M (12–1)	Texas A&M (12–1)	Utah State (17–2)	Villanova (17–2)	Villanova (17–3)	North Carolina (17–5)	Villanova (19–5)	9.
10.	Utah (1–0)	USC (3–2)	Indiana (4–1)	NYU (6–0)	Texas A&M (8–0)	Saint Louis (10–3)	USC (11–5)	Utah State (14–2)	Utah State (15–2)	Texas A&M (14–2)	Texas A&M (16–2)	Texas A&M (17–3)	Villanova (18–5)	Indiana (20–4)	10.
11.	Saint Joseph's (2–0)	Indiana (2–1)	North Carolina (3–2)	North Carolina (4–2)	Wake Forest (7–2)	North Carolina (7–3)	North Carolina (9–3)	North Carolina (9–3)	North Carolina (9–3)	North Carolina (10–3)	North Carolina (12–4)	St. John's (16–5)	St. Bonaventure (17–3)	St. Bonaventure (19–3)	11.
12.	Bradley (1–0)	Georgia Tech (5–0)	Kentucky (4–3)	Texas A&M (5–0)	North Carolina (6–3)	Villanova (9–0)	Utah State (13–2)	USC (11–5)	Dayton (15–3)	Dayton (16–3)	Saint Louis (14–6)	North Carolina (14–5)	Saint Louis (17–6)	NYU (19–3)	12.
13.	Louisville (2–1)	Kentucky (2–2)	NYU (5–0)	Iowa (7–1)	Indiana (8–2)	Utah State (11–2)	Iowa (12–3)	Saint Louis (10–5)	USC (11–5)	Saint Louis (13–5)	St. John's (14–5)	St. Bonaventure (15–3)	NYU (17–3) т	Texas (18–6)	13.
14.	Kansas State (1–1)	Iowa (4–0)	Villanova (6–0)	Kentucky (5–3)	Villanova (7–0)	Iowa (10–3)	Saint Louis (10–5)	Kentucky (10–4) т	Kansas State (11–5)	Illinois (12–3) т	Dayton (16–4)	Saint Louis (17–6)	St. John's (17–6) т	North Carolina (18–6)	14.
15.	USC (3–0) т	Villanova (4–0)	USC (3–2)	Kansas (5–3)	Iowa (8–3)	Iowa State (9–3)	Kentucky (10–4)	Iowa State (9–6) т	Saint Louis (11–5)	Kentucky (13–5) т	Kentucky (15–5)	NYU (15–3)	Texas (18–5)	Duke (15–10)	15.
16.	Georgia Tech (3–0) т	Illinois (2–0) т	Texas A&M (5–0)	Villanova (6–0)	Iowa State (8–2)	Illinois (8–2)	Illinois (10–2)	Kansas State (10–5)	St. Bonaventure (11–3) т	St. Bonaventure (11–3) т	NYU (13–3) т	Auburn (17–3)	Auburn (19–3)	Kansas State (16–9)	16.
17.	Wake Forest (1–1)	NC State (2–3) т	Illinois (4–0) т	Georgia Tech (7–1)	Utah State (10–2)	Wake Forest (8–3)	Notre Dame (13–5)	Iowa (13–3)	Saint Joseph's (12–4) т	USC (11–7) т	St. Bonaventure (13–3) т	Wake Forest (17–6)	Wake Forest (19–6)	Auburn (19–3)	17.
18.	Villanova (2–0) т	NYU (4–0) т	Iowa (5–1) т	Duke (8–1) т	SMU (7–3)	Kentucky (8–4) т	Kansas (9–5)	Dayton (13–3)	Indiana (10–4) т	Saint Joseph's (12–5) т	Illinois (13–4) т	Dayton (16–6)	Texas A&M (17–5)	Providence (21–4)	18.
19.	St. John's (2–1) т	Texas A&M (4–0) т	Michigan State (4–0)	USC (6–2) т	Saint Joseph's (8–2)	Indiana (8–4) т	Indiana (9–4)	Wake Forest (11–4)	Kentucky (12–5) т	Louisville (12–6) т	Wake Forest (13–6) т	Texas (15–5)	Dayton (17–6)	Saint Louis (18–7)	19.
20.	UCLA (2–1) т NC State (1–1) т	Louisville (4–1) т	Notre Dame (6–1)	Michigan State (4–2)	Kentucky (6–4)	Kansas (8–4) т Notre Dame (11–5) т	NYU (9–2) т SMU (10–4) т Saint Joseph's (11–3) т	Indiana (9–4) т Saint Joseph's (11–4) т	Iowa State (12–6) т SMU (10–4) т	Kansas State (11–6) т Wake Forest (13–6) т	Kansas State (12–7)	Kentucky (16–6)	Kansas (15–8)	Dayton (19–6)	20.
	Week 1 Dec. 8	Week 2 Dec. 14	Week 3 Dec. 21	Week 4 Dec. 28	Week 5 Jan. 5	Week 6 Jan. 12	Week 7 Jan. 19	Week 8 Jan. 26	Week 9 Feb. 2	Week 10 Feb. 9	Week 11 Feb. 16	Week 12 Feb. 23	Week 13 Mar. 1	Final Mar. 8	
		Dropped: Saint Joseph's; Kansas State; Wake Forest; St. John's; UCLA	Dropped: NC State; Louisville	Dropped: Notre Dame	Dropped: Illinois (7–1); NYU; Kansas; Duke; Michigan State	Dropped: SMU; Saint Joseph's	Dropped: Iowa State; Wake Forest	Dropped: Illinois; Notre Dame; Kansas; NYU; SMU	Dropped: Iowa; Wake Forest	Dropped: Indiana; Iowa State; SMU	Dropped: USC; Saint Joseph's; Louisville	Dropped: Illinois; Kansas State	Dropped: Kentucky	Dropped: St. John's (17–7); Texas A&M (17–6)	
