= Satch Sanders =

American basketball player and coach (born 1938)

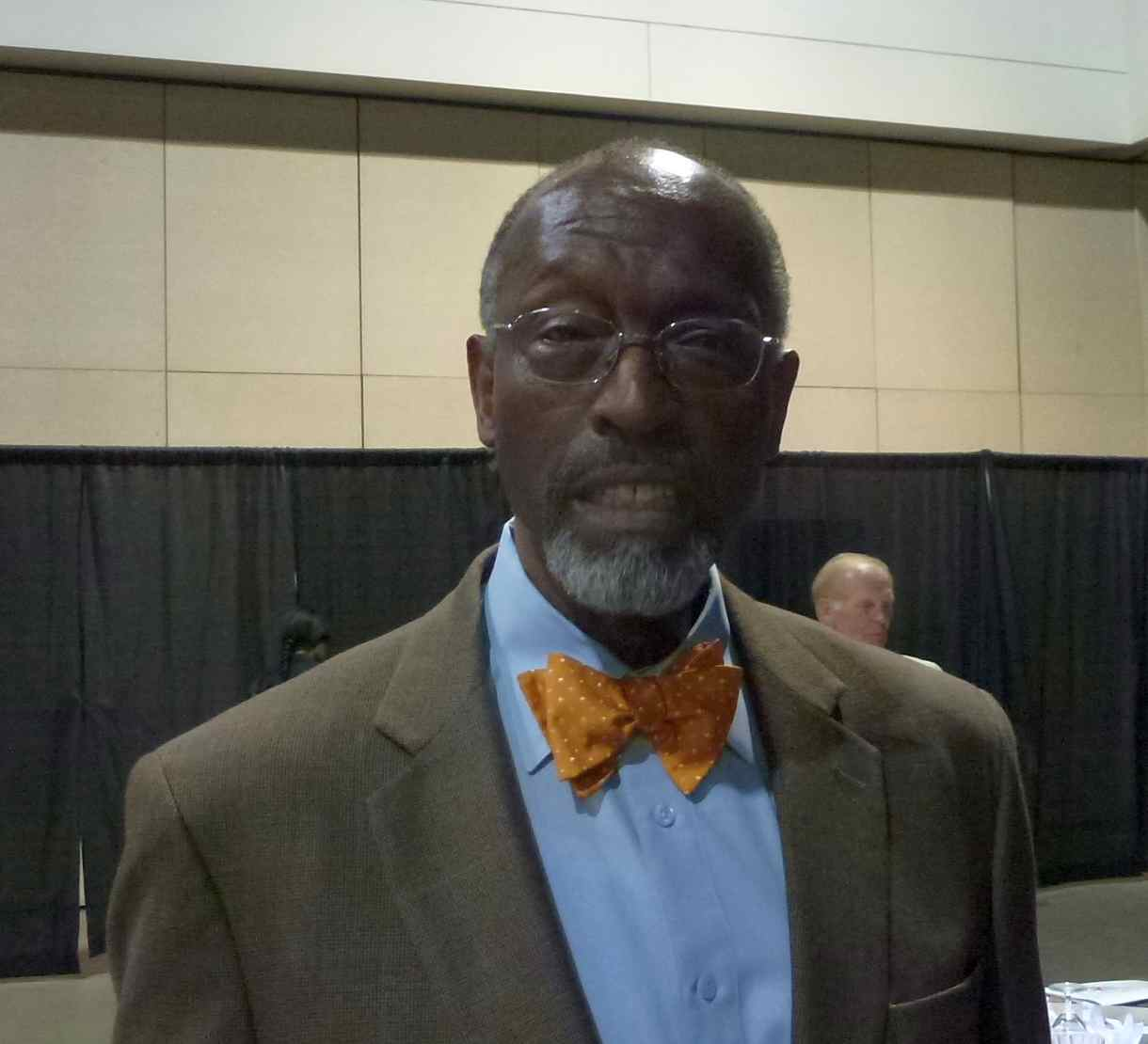
- Sanders in 2013

Personal information
- Born: November 8, 1938 (age 88) New York City, New York, U.S.
- Listed height: 6 ft 6 in (1.98 m)
- Listed weight: 210 lb (95 kg)

Career information
- High school: Seward Park (New York City, New York)
- College: NYU (1957–1960)
- NBA draft: 1960: 1st round, 8th overall pick
- Drafted by: Boston Celtics
- Playing career: 1960–1973
- Position: Power forward
- Number: 16
- Coaching career: 1973–1978

Career history

Playing
- 1960–1973: Boston Celtics

Career highlights
- 8× NBA champion (1961–1966, 1968, 1969); NBA All-Defensive Second Team (1969); No. 16 retired by Boston Celtics; Third-team All-American – UPI (1960); Haggerty Award (1960); John Bunn Award (2007)

Career playing statistics
- Points: 8,766 (9.6 ppg)
- Rebounds: 5,798 (6.3 rpg)
- Assists: 1,026 (1.1 apg)
- Stats at NBA.com
- Stats at Basketball Reference

Career coaching record
- NBA: 23–39 (.371)
- College: 40–60 (.400)
- Record at Basketball Reference
- Basketball Hall of Fame

Thomas Ernest "Satch" Sanders (born November 8, 1938) is an American former professional basketball player and coach who played as a small forward and power forward in the National Basketball Association (NBA) for 13 seasons with the Boston Celtics. The Celtics selected him in the first round of the 1960 NBA draft. Sanders won eight NBA championships and is tied for third for the most NBA championships. He is also one of three NBA players with an unsurpassed 8–0 record in NBA Finals series. He was considered among the best defensive forwards in NBA history during his playing days. During his Celtics' career, he had a stretch of playing in 459 consecutive regular season games. He was selected to the NBA-All Defensive Team second-team in 1968; the inaugural year for those defensive recognition awards.

After his playing retirement, he served as a head coach for the Harvard Crimson men's basketball team and the Boston Celtics. In 1987, he was hired by the NBA to establish and lead the NBA's Rookie Transition Program. He retired after 20 years as the NBA's vice president of player programs, and in 2007 was presented with the John Bunn Award by the Naismith Basketball Hall of Fame. Sanders was inducted into the Naismith Basketball Hall of Fame as a contributor in 2011.

Sanders played college basketball at New York University (NYU) in the Metropolitan New York Conference. He was twice named first-team All-Metropolitan Conference, and led the conference in both scoring and rebounding as a senior. United Press International named Sanders a third-team All-American in 1960. He received the Haggerty Award in 1960 as the best player in the New York metropolitan area. He led NYU to the 1960 NCAA University Division basketball tournament, reaching the Final Four before losing to eventual tournament champion Ohio State. Sanders was named to the All-Tournament first team.

== Early life ==
Sanders was born on November 8, 1938, in New York City. At the time he was to attend high school black teens in New York City were encouraged to attend vocational high schools. Sanders was from Brooklyn, but his closest friends encouraged him to instead attend Seward Park High School in Manhattan, where he played basketball under coach Henry Cohen. Sanders was selected to play in a high school basketball all-star game between New York and New Jersey players in 1956. One of his New York all-star teammates in that game was Doug Moe.

Sanders got the nickname “Satch” as a teenaged playground baseball pitcher because he had some resemblance to Satchel Paige when he pitched.

== College career ==
Sanders received a scholarship to attend New York University (NYU), where he majored in marketing. He played on the Violets varsity basketball team from 1957 to 1960, playing in the Metropolitan New York Conference. As a 6 ft 6 in (1.98 m) sophomore forward, Sanders averaged 11.9 points and 12.1 rebounds per game, on a 10–11 Violets team.

As a junior (1957–58), Sanders averaged 15.9 points and 11.2 rebounds per game. His .555 field goal percentage was fifth highest among all college players. Sanders had the third highest rebounding average among all Metropolitan Conference players and the fourth best scoring average. He was selected to the All-Metropolitan Conference first team.

The Violets improved to 15–8 that season. NYU was selected to play in the 1959 National Invitation Tournament (NIT). Sanders scored 18 points in the Violets second round win over a top 20 ranked Oklahoma City University team, 63–48. NYU lost to top 10 ranked Bradley, 59–57, in the semifinal round. In March, Sanders was among the college players chosen to participate in tryouts for the 1960 United States men's Olympic basketball team.

Sanders was elected team captain in May 1959, before going into his senior season (1959–60). United Press International (UPI) named him a third-team All-American in 1960. He played center that season. As a senior, Sanders led the Metropolitan Conference in both scoring (21.4 points per game) and rebounding (15.2 points per game). He had a .517 field goal percentage. NYU won the Metropolitan Conference, and had an overall record of 22–5. Sanders was unanimously selected first-team All-Metropolitan Conference, and was nearly unanimously selected for the Haggerty Award, presented to the top player in the New York metropolitan area.

NYU participated in the 1960 NCAA University Division basketball tournament. They defeated Connecticut in the first round, 78–59. Sanders had 11 points, 15 rebounds, and played strong defense in the game. NYU then upset West Virginia 82–81 in overtime, in the East Regional semifinals. Sanders led NYU with 28 points in that game. NYU then upset Duke 74–59. Sanders led NYU again with 22 points (19 in the second half), and had 16 rebounds against Duke.

NYU played Ohio State in the Final Four, losing to the eventual national championship team, 76–54; with Sanders limited to eight points. The Ohio State team included future Naismith Basketball Hall of Famers John Havlicek and Jerry Lucas, and future nine-year NBA guard Larry Siegfried; with Sanders having the job of guarding Ohio State center Lucas. (Havlicek and Siegfried would become Sanders' long-time teammates in the NBA with the Boston Celtics.) Ohio State head coach Fred Taylor said after the game that Sanders "'has the best moves as a rebounder I've seen'". NYU then lost the third-place game to Cincinnati and Oscar Robertson, 95–71, but Sanders had 27 points. Sanders was selected to the NCAA All-Tournament Team, and the East Regional All-Tournament Team.

== Professional career ==
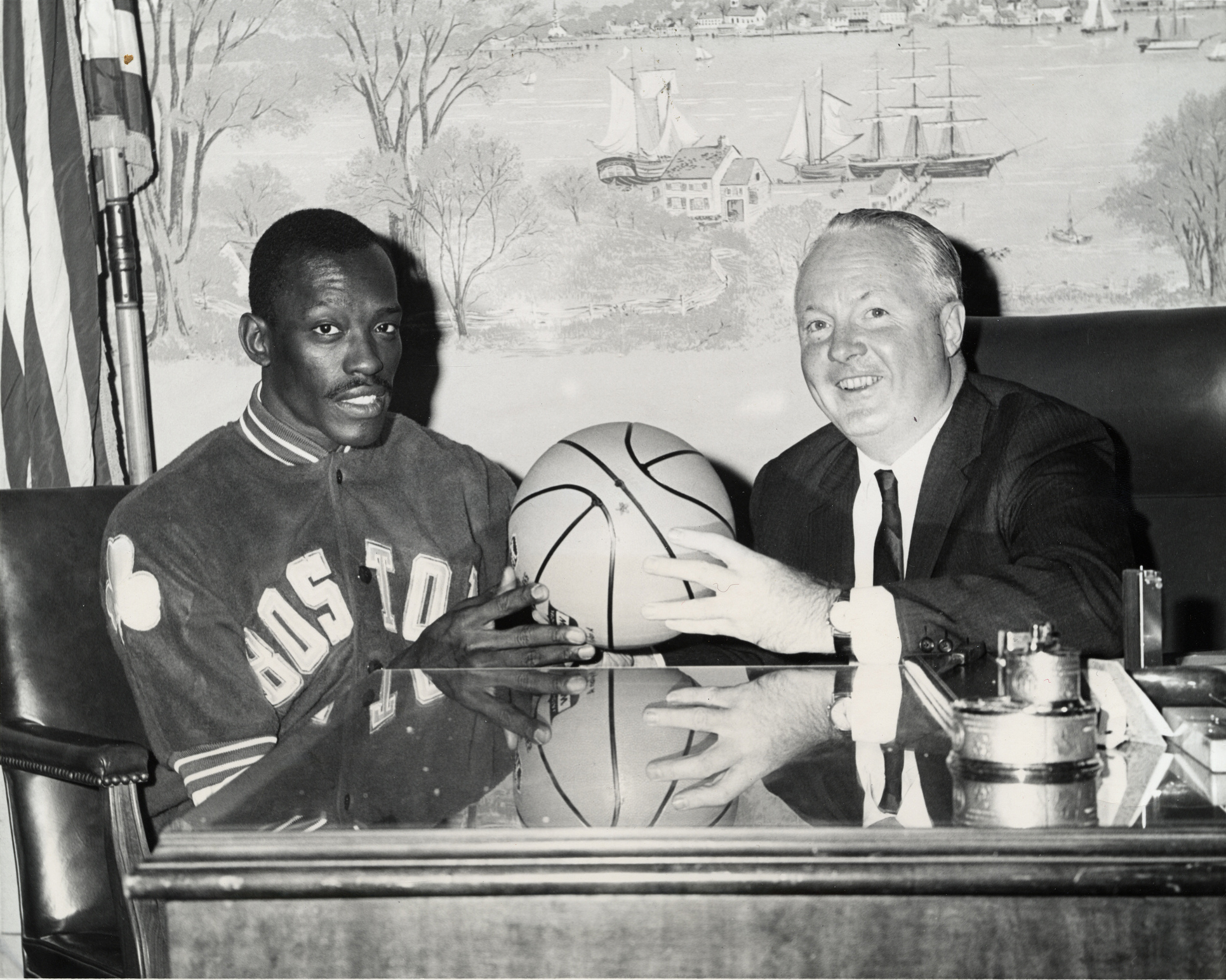
Sanders with Boston mayor John F. Collins in the 1960s

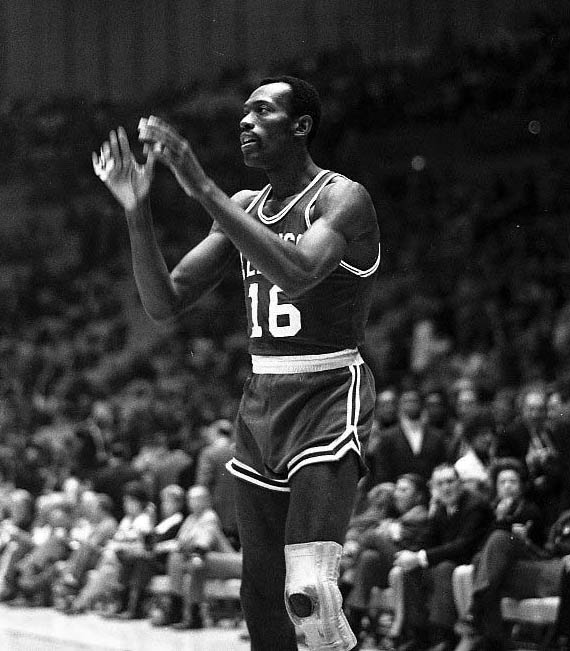
Sanders with the Boston Celtics

The Boston Celtics selected Sanders in the first round of the 1960 NBA draft, eighth overall. Celtics coach Red Auerbach told Sanders he was drafted for his defensive ability. He spent all of his 13 years in the National Basketball Association (NBA) with the Boston Celtics at both small forward and power forward. He was part of eight championship teams (1961 to 1966, 1968 and 1969). In NBA history, only teammates Bill Russell and Sam Jones have won more championship rings during their playing careers; while three other teammates, John Havlicek, Tom Heinsohn and K. C. Jones, also won eight championship rings. He is also one of three NBA players (along with Havlicek and K. C. Jones) with an unsurpassed 8–0 record in NBA Finals series. Sports Illustrated has listed Sanders and Havlicek as the NBA small forwards with the most championships.

As a rookie (1960–61) he was a reserve small forward, averaging 15.9 minutes, 5.3 points, and 5.7 rebounds per game. The Celtics were 1961 NBA champions, under Hall of Fame coach Red Auerbach. The team included seven future Hall of Fame players: Bob Cousy, Tom Heinsohn, K. C. Jones, Sam Jones, Frank Ramsey, Bill Russell, and Bill Sharman; in addition to Sanders. Sanders averaged 19.4 minutes, 8.2 points, and 7.8 rebounds per game in the Celtics Eastern Division series win over the Syracuse Nationals. In the five game 1961 NBA finals victory over the St. Louis Hawks, he averaged 23.8 minutes, 9.6 points, and nine rebounds per game.

In his second season (1961–62), Sanders played in 80 games, averaging 29.1 minutes, 11.2 points, and 9.5 rebounds per game. The Celtics were again NBA champions. He scored a career-high 30 points to go along with 26 rebounds in a 142–110 win over the Syracuse Nationals on March 13, 1962. Sanders averaged 30.6 minutes, 7.4 points, and 9.6 rebounds per game in the seven game Eastern Division finals win over Wilt Chamberlain and the Philadelphia Warriors.

In the seven game 1962 NBA finals win over the Los Angeles Lakers, Sanders averaged 32.1 minutes, 12.7 points, 6.6 rebounds, and 1.6 assists per game. He had 16 points and 13 rebounds in the Celtics Game 1 win, and 20 points and six rebounds in the series-tying Game 6 win. The Lakers' Hall of Fame forward Elgin Baylor had scored 61 points in the Lakers' Game 5 win, but "only" 34 in Game 6. After that game, coach Auerbach said Sanders "'was a big factor . . . He played his best game and his defensive job on Baylor was a gem'".

John Havlicek joined the Celtics in the 1962–63 season. Forwards Sanders, Havlicek, and Heinsohn all averaged between 26.4 and 27.5 minutes per game. Sanders averaged 26.9 minutes, 10.8 points, and 7.2 rebounds per game. The Celtics defeated Oscar Robertson and the Cincinnati Royals in seven games to win the 1963 Eastern Division finals. Sanders averaged 24.4 minutes, 6.7 points, 5.4 rebounds, and 1.6 assists per game in that series.

The Celtics won the 1963 NBA Finals in six games over the Lakers. Sanders played 35.8 minutes per game, averaging 13.5 points, 9.7 rebounds, and 1.3 assists per game. Once again, it was Sanders' role to defend Baylor, and in Game 2 he received credit for helping to "hold" Baylor to only 30 points. In the Lakers two wins, Baylor had 38 points and 23 rebounds, and 43 points and 20 rebounds. In the Game 6 Celtics series-clinching win, Sanders held Baylor to nine points in the first half, and Lakers' coach Fred Schaus moved Baylor to guard (where he had 19 points in the second half, and eight rebounds in the game). Teammate Bob Cousy later said of Sanders "I used to feel sorry for Satch . . . He'd break his back night after night guarding the toughest forwards, the Baylors, Pettits, Gus Johnsons, Dave DeBusscheres, and the average fan, reading the scoring totals – or even watching the game – would see only that Satch's man scored 25 or 30 points".

In 1963–64, Sanders averaged 29.6 minutes, 11.4 points, 8.3 rebounds, and 1.3 assists per game; and the Celtics won the NBA championship again. Former Ohio State opponent Larry Siegfried joined the Celtics that season. The Celtics beat the Royals (who now had Jerry Lucas as well as Oscar Robertson) in five games in the 1964 Eastern Division finals; with Sanders averaging 26.8 minutes, eight points, and 7.4 rebounds per game. The Celtics won the 1964 NBA Finals in five games over Chamberlain and the San Francisco Warriors. Sanders averaged 31.6 minutes, 10.2 points, and 6.2 rebounds in that series.

The Celtics were NBA champions again in the 1964–65 season. Sanders played in all 80 Celtics regular season games for a fourth consecutive season. He played a career-high 30.7 minutes per game; averaging 11.8 points and 8.3 rebounds per game. The Celtics won the Eastern Division finals against Chamberlain and the Philadelphia 76ers in seven games, winning Game 7, 110–109. Sanders averaged 29.9 minutes, 12.9 points, 8.3 rebounds, and 1.3 assists per game in that series. Sanders had 25 points and 15 rebound in a Game 6 loss to the 76ers, and 18 points and 10 rebounds in the Game 7 win; scoring the winning field goal in that game. The Celtics then beat the Lakers in five games to win the 1965 NBA Finals. Sanders averaged 31.8 minutes, 13.8 points, 8.8 rebounds, and two assists per game. Baylor was injured earlier in the 1965 NBA playoffs, and did not play in the finals against the Celtics.

In Sanders' sixth year with the Celtics, they were NBA champions for a sixth consecutive season. Sanders played in 72 of 80 games that season, averaging 26.3 minutes, 12.6 points, and 7.1 rebounds per game. He suffered a knee strain in a January 14, 1966 game against the Philadelphia 76ers that ended his consecutive game playing streak at 459 games. This remained a Celtics' record until broken by teammate Don Nelson in December 1972.

The Celtics defeated the Royals three-games-to-two in the Eastern Division semifinals. Sanders averaged 16.2 points, 5.4, and 1.4 assists per game in that series. They defeated the 76ers in five games in the Eastern Division finals, with Sanders averaging 9.6 points, 7.6 rebounds, and 1.4 assists per game. The Celtics won a seven-game series over the Lakers to win the NBA championship in 1966. Sanders averaged 29.4 minutes, 14.4 points, 6.4 rebounds, and 1.9 assists per game. He had 11 points and 16 rebounds in Game 1, 22 points and eight rebounds in Game 3, and 23 points and 10 rebounds in Game 6.

Sanders played in every Celtics regular season game again in 1966–67 (81 games). He averaged 23.8 minutes, 10.2 points, 5.4 rebounds, and 1.1 assists per game. The Celtics lost to the 76ers in the 1967 Eastern Division finals; the first time they were not NBA champions since the 1958–59 season. Sanders only averaged 11.6 minutes per game in that series.

Sanders won his seventh NBA championship with the Celtics in 1967–68. He averaged 25.4 minutes, 10.2 points, 5.8 rebounds, and 1.3 assists per game that season. Sanders averaged 27 minutes, 11.2 points and 5.7 rebounds per game in the Eastern Division semifinals against the Detroit Pistons. He averaged 22.4 minutes, 9.8 points, and 5.4 rebounds per game over five games in the seven-game Eastern Division finals victory over the 76ers. Sanders suffered a pulled muscle in his lower back during the fifth game of that series and did not play in the last two games; and he only played in three games, for seven minutes, in the 1968 finals win over the Lakers.

Sanders was selected to the second-team NBA All-Defensive Team in the 1968–69 season. This was the NBA's first season selecting All-Defensive teams. He played in all 82 games that season; averaging 26.6 minutes, 11.2 points, seven rebounds, and 1.3 assists per game. The Celtics defeated the 76ers in the Eastern Division semifinals in five game. Sanders averaged 15.8 minutes, 7.8 points, and 6.4 rebounds per game. The Celtics won the Eastern Division finals over the New York Knicks in six games. Sanders played in five games, averaging 15.8 minutes, 6.8 points and two rebounds per game. The Celtics defeated Wilt Chamberlain, Jerry West, Elgin Baylor and the Lakers in the 1969 NBA Finals in seven games; but Sanders only played 39 minutes in five games during that series.

Sanders played in only 57 games in the 1969–70 season, the fewest in his NBA career to date. He suffered strained knee ligaments in a February 1, 1970 game and did not play again until March 20. Sanders' knee gave out in the next game and he had to be helped off the court. This was during the last Celtics' 1970 regular season game. Rather than undergoing knee surgery at that point he attempted to rehabilitate his knee injury with rest and proper exercise. He reinjured the knee during the 1970–71 preseason and had to undergo knee surgery in October 1970. He was not reactivated until the end of January 1971. He only played in 17 games during the 1970–71 season.

Sanders returned and played in all 82 games during the 1971–72 season. He averaged 19.9 minutes, 6.6 points, 4.3 rebounds, and 1.2 assists per game. During that season, Celtics' coach Tom Heinsohn said Sanders was the team's "stopper" during his short time playing in games as a reserve. "He doesn't make mistakes. He doesn't go for fakes, and he's willing to sacrifice his offense for defense". In the Celtics' first round playoff series win over the Atlanta Hawks, Sanders played in all six games, averaging 17.8 minutes, five points, and three rebounds per game. He played in all five games in the Celtics five-game Eastern Conference Finals loss to the New York Knicks, averaging 15.8 minutes, 3.4 points, and 1.6 rebounds. During his final NBA season (1972–73), Sanders played in 59 games, averaging 7.2 minutes per game.

Sanders retired after the 1973 season. He played 916 regular season games for the Celtics in his 13-year career. He averaged 24.2 minutes, 9.6 points, 6.3 rebounds, and 1.1 assists per game. He had 8,766 total points and 5,798 total rebounds. In 130 playoff games, he averaged 8.8 points, 5.8 rebounds, and one assist per game. He has played the seventh most games in Celtics' history; and is eighth in total rebounds.

== Coaching and scouting career ==
Following his playing career Sanders became the head basketball coach at Harvard University, a position he held until 1977. Sanders became the first African-American to serve as a head coach of any sport in the Ivy League. He coached four seasons at Harvard (1973 to 1977), with a 40–60 record. He led the Crimson to 9–5 Ivy League records during his first two seasons.

Sanders began the 1977–78 season as an assistant coach for the Celtics, under head coach Tommy Heinsohn. In addition to being a former teammate, Heinsohn had been Sanders' coach with the Celtics from 1969 to 1973. Celtics' president and general manager Red Auerbach fired Heinsohn on January 3, 1978, with an 11–23 record; and replaced him with Sanders as head coach. Sanders had a 21–27 record over the remainder of the season. Sanders returned the following season; however, after a 2–12 record to start the 1978–79 season, he was fired by Celtics' owner John Y. Brown Jr. and replaced by 30-year old Dave Cowens, who took on the role as a player-coach. The Celtics finished the season with a 29–53 record. The Celtics subsequently made Sanders their chief scout.

== Rookie transition program ==
In 1984, Sanders became the associate director for Northeastern University's Center for the Study of Sport in Society. He developed a program to help young professional athletes in transitioning into their new jobs and lifestyle. He was hired by the NBA in 1987 to lead the development and institution of the NBA’s Rookie Transition Program. This evolved to also include the league's continuing to work on life management skills with its players through their careers and retirement. The NBA program became the model that nearly all professional sports leagues subsequently adopted to work with their own athletes. Sanders' work has affected the lives of thousands of athletes. The Naismith Basketball Hall of Fame describes Sanders as "founding a number of player programs to give NBA players the tools to be successful in basketball and in life" and introducing "initiatives for young players and veterans alike, helping superstar athletes understand and appreciate their status as role models, leaders, and celebrities". Sanders retired as the NBA's vice president of player programs in 2007.

== Legacy and honors ==
In 2011, Sanders was inducted into the Naismith Basketball Hall of Fame as a contributor; principally for positively affecting thousands of lives through his role in developing programs to educate players in managing their lives; while also recognizing his prowess as a basketball player. In 2007, Sanders was presented with the John W. Bunn Lifetime Achievement Award by the Naismith Basketball Hall of Fame. The Celtics have retired his No. 16 jersey.

When Sanders retired as a player, New York Times sportswriter Sam Goldaper wrote "Tom Sanders was always one of the lowest scoring forwards in the National Basketball Association. But the men who played against him would tell you that this 6‐foot 6‐inch quiet man was for much of his 13‐season pro career the best defensive forward in the N.B.A." The Naismith Hall of Fame states that once Sanders entered the NBA, he sacrificed "his offensive skill set to contribute on the defensive end. Night after night, Celtics coach Red Auerbach assigned Sanders the unenviable task of stopping the opponent’s top offensive threat. Satch handled the dirty work guarding the likes of Pettit, DeBusschere, and Baylor". In the early 1970s, Sports Illustrated described Sanders as "the best defensive forward ever in the National Basketball Association".

== Personal life ==
Sanders and the Celtics met with President John F. Kennedy at the White House in 1963. Kennedy proved himself knowledgeable about basketball and made the players feel relaxed with him. As they were leaving and each receiving a farewell handshake from Kennedy, when it was Sanders' turn he said to Kennedy "Take it easy, baby".

On March 20, 1968, a housing development group formed by Sanders (called the Sanders Associates) received a $996,000 FHA commitment through the Boston Rehabilitation Program (BURP) for the rehabilitation of 83 units in Roxbury, Massachusetts after local community activists (including Mel King) criticized BURP for a lack of sufficient community control and racial equity. Sanders bought the dilapidated buildings "for the social thing," believing that Black residents should do more to help their own community but, "from a business standpoint, it was a disaster." His utility bills were higher than the rents he brought in and, by the time the Boston Rent Control Board approved one increase, he was in need of another. The bank foreclosed on him and HUD took over ownership.

== NBA career statistics ==
Legend
GP	Games played	GS	Games started	MPG	Minutes per game
FG%	Field goal percentage	3P%	3-point field goal percentage	FT%	Free throw percentage
RPG	Rebounds per game	APG	Assists per game	SPG	Steals per game
BPG	Blocks per game	PPG	Points per game	**Bold**	Career high
†	Won an NBA championship

=== Regular season ===
Year	Team	GP	MPG	FG%	FT%	RPG	APG	PPG
1960–61†	Boston	68	15.9	.420	.670	5.7	0.6	5.3
1961–62†	Boston	80	29.1	.435	.749	**9.5**	0.9	11.2
1962–63†	Boston	80	26.9	**.456**	.738	7.2	1.2	10.8
1963–64†	Boston	80	29.6	.417	.761	8.3	1.3	11.4
1964–65†	Boston	80	**30.7**	.429	.745	8.3	1.2	11.8
1965–66†	Boston	72	26.3	.428	.764	7.1	1.3	**12.6**
1966–67	Boston	81	23.8	.428	.817	5.4	1.1	10.2
1967–68†	Boston	78	25.4	.428	.784	5.8	1.3	10.2
1968–69†	Boston	**82**	26.6	.430	.733	7.0	1.3	11.2
1969–70	Boston	57	28.4	.443	**.880**	5.5	**1.6**	11.5
1970–71	Boston	17	7.1	.364	.875	1.0	0.6	2.3
1971–72	Boston	**82**	19.9	.410	.816	4.3	1.2	6.6
1972–73	Boston	59	7.2	.315	.657	1.5	0.5	2.0
Career		916	24.2	.428	.767	6.3	1.1	9.6

=== Playoffs ===
Year	Team	GP	MPG	FG%	FT%	RPG	APG	PPG
1961†	Boston	10	21.6	.493	.625	8.4	0.7	8.9
1962†	Boston	14	**31.4**	.431	**.806**	8.2	1.0	10.1
1963†	Boston	13	29.8	.437	.774	7.4	1.5	9.8
1964†	Boston	10	30.2	.362	.676	6.8	0.6	9.1
1965†	Boston	12	30.4	.421	.721	**8.5**	**1.6**	13.3
1966†	Boston	**17**	29.4	.483	.750	6.5	**1.6**	**13.5**
1967	Boston	9	16.0	.344	.400	4.8	0.6	4.9
1968†	Boston	14	20.6	.505	.762	4.5	0.9	8.3
1969†	Boston	15	13.1	.438	.742	3.2	0.5	5.8
1972	Boston	11	16.9	.321	.619	2.4	0.9	4.3
1973	Boston	5	4.8	**.556**	.000	1.0	0.2	2.0
Career		130	23.5	.436	.716	5.8	1.0	8.8

== Head coaching record ==
=== NCAA ===
Record table
Season	Team	Overall	Conference	Standing	Postseason
Harvard Crimson (Ivy League) (2009–2024)
1973–74	Harvard	11–13	9–5	4th	
1974–75	Harvard	12–13	9–5	3rd	
1975–76	Harvard	8–18	3–11	8th	
1976–77	Harvard	9–16	6–8	4th	
Harvard:		40–60 (.400)	27–29 (.482)		
Total:		40–60 (.400)			
National champion Postseason invitational champion Conference regular season champion Conference regular season and conference tournament champion Division regular season champion Division regular season and conference tournament champion Conference tournament champion

=== NBA ===
Team	Year	G	W	L	W–L%	Finish	PG	PW	PL	PW–L%	Result
Boston	1977–78	48	21	27	.438	3rd in Atlantic	—	—	—	—	Missed playoffs
Boston	1978–79	14	2	12	.143		—	—	—	—	
Career		62	23	39	.371		0	0	0	–	

== Gallery ==
Photos of Sanders
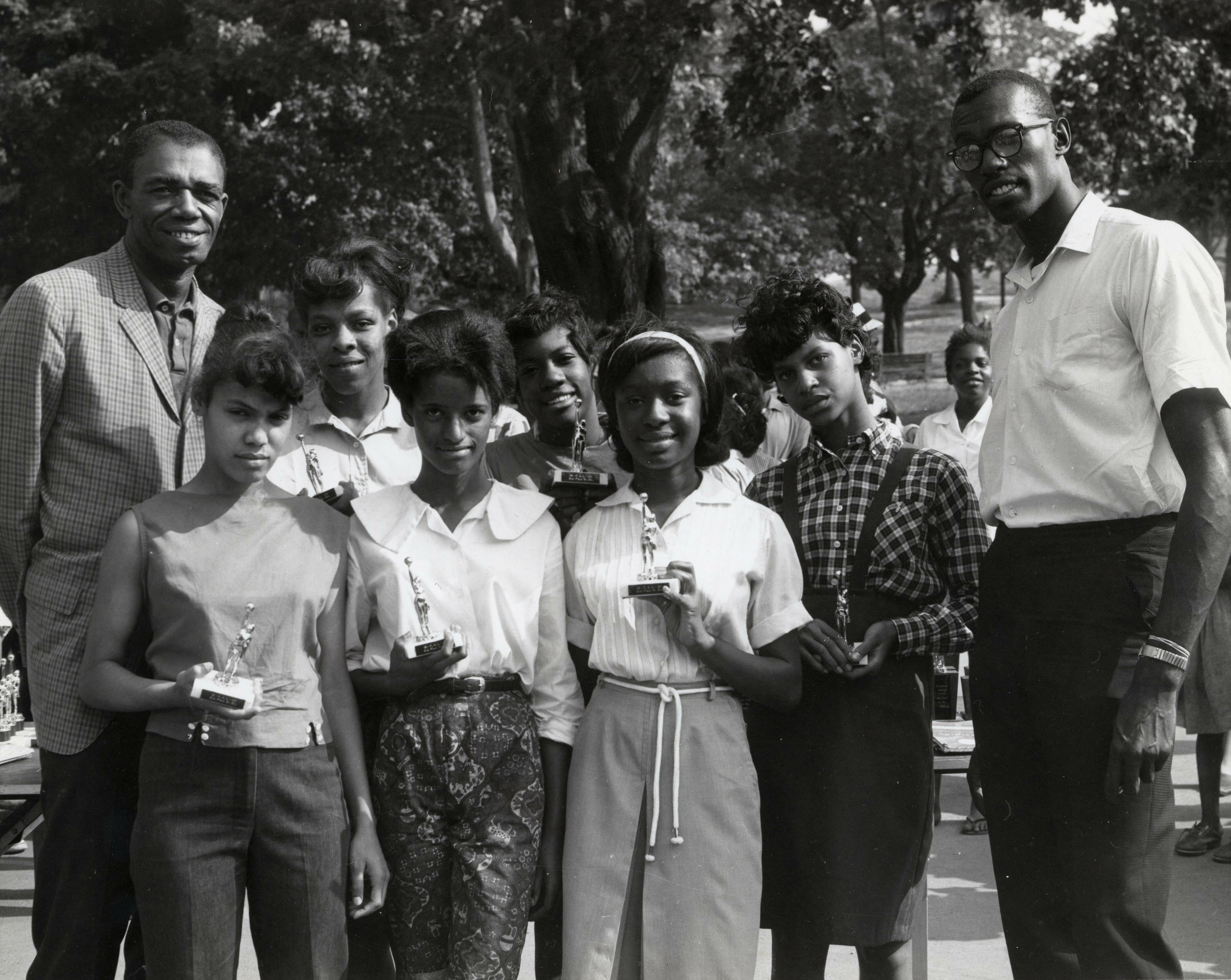
Sanders (far right) and Celtics teammate Sam Jones (far left) pose with youth basketball trophy recipients in the 1960s

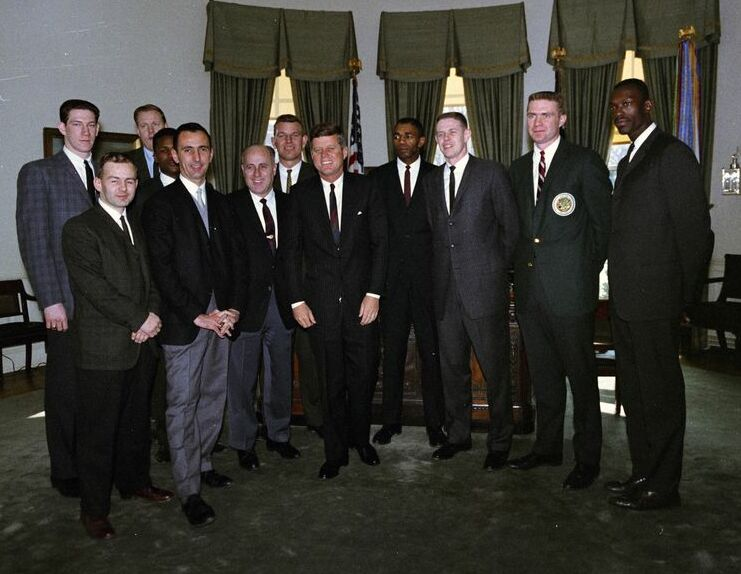
Sanders (far right) and his Celtics teammates pose with President John F. Kennedy in the Oval Office of the White House in January 1963

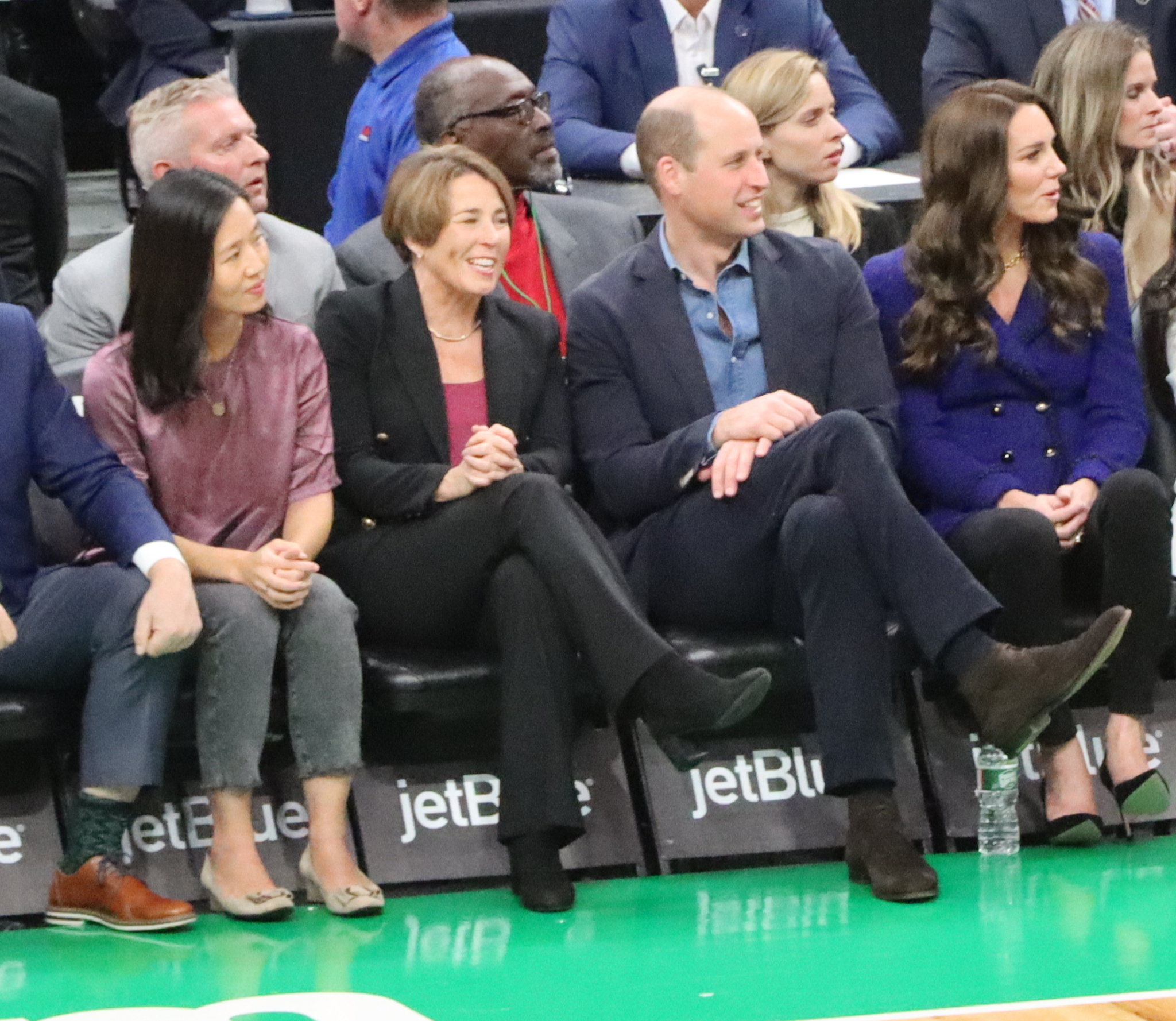
Sanders (back center) watching a November 2022 Boston Celtics game. In the front row are Boston Mayor Michelle Wu; Massachusetts Governor–elect Maura Healey; and diplomatic guests William, Prince of Wales and Catherine, Princess of Wales (visiting Boston for the 2022 Earthshot Prize)
