= Arthur Loche =

American basketball player and coach (1936–1992)

Biographical details
- Born: January 31, 1936; New York, New York, U.S.
- Died: June 18, 1992 (aged 56); New York, New York, U.S.

Playing career
- 1959–1961: NYU

Coaching career (HC unless noted)
- 1961–1965: NYU (asst.)
- 1965–1972: Vermont
- 1969, 1971: Vaqueros de Bayamón
- 1972–1976: Florida Tech

Head coaching record
- Overall: 106–152

Accomplishments and honors

Championships
- 2x Baloncesto Superior Nacional champion (1969, 1971)

Arthur Kenneth Loche (January 31, 1936 – June 18, 1992) was an American former college basketball coach and was the head men's basketball coach at Vermont from 1965 to 1972.

== Playing career ==
Loche grew up on New York City's West Side and attended the High School of Commerce. He served two years in the United States Navy before entering New York University.

Loche played three seasons (1958–1961) for the NYU Violets men's basketball team, he averaged 4.8 points and 1.2 rebounds per game. He was a reserve guard on the Violets' 1959–60 Final Four squad and teammate of Naismith Hall of Fame member Satch Sanders. Loche was team captain his senior season. He was that season's winner of the James Lancaster Memorial Trophy, which was given to NYU's best defensive player.

== Coaching career ==
In April 1961, Loche was named NYU's assistant varsity and head freshmen basketball coach. He succeeded Jack Rohan, who became the head coach at Columbia. Loche remained at NYU until 1965, when he accepted the head men's basketball position at Vermont. Over a seven-year period, Loche guided the Catamounts to a 69–96 record before stepping down to take the head men's basketball coach and athletic director position at Florida Institute of Technology. He coached the Panthers to their first ever winning season in 1975–76. He resigned in 1976 to enter private business in South Florida.

During the college basketball off season, Loche coached Vaqueros de Bayamón in Puerto Rico, leading the squad to Baloncesto Superior Nacional titles in 1969 and 1971.

== Later life ==
Hodgkin lymphoma forced Loche to retire. He lived with a brother in Freeport, New York for a year before settling in Manhattan. He died at Roosevelt Hospital on June 18, 1992. He was interred in Calverton National Cemetery.

== Head coaching record ==
=== College ===
Record table
Season	Team	Overall	Conference	Standing	Postseason
Vermont (Yankee Conference) (1965–1972)
1965–66	Vermont	12–8	3–7	5th	
1966–67	Vermont	9–15	1–9	5th	
1967–68	Vermont	12–12	5–5	4th	
1968–69	Vermont	14–11	3–7	T–4th	
1969–70	Vermont	8–16	3–7	T–4th	
1970–71	Vermont	9–15	1–9	6th	
1971–72	Vermont	5–19	0–10	6th	
Vermont:		69–96	16–53		
Florida Tech (Sunshine State Conference) (1972–1976)
1972–73	Florida Tech	8–17			
1973–74	Florida Tech	5–19			
1974–75	Florida Tech	6–12			
1975–76	Florida Tech	19–8			
Florida Tech:		38–56			
Total:		106–152			
