= 1959–60 Georgia Bulldogs basketball team =

American college basketball season

1959–60 Georgia Bulldogs basketball
- Conference: Southeastern Conference
- Record: 12–13 (6–8 SEC)
- Head coach: Harbin Lawson (9th season)
- Captain: Gordon Darrah
- Home arena: Woodruff Hall

1959–60 Southeastern Conference men's basketball standings
	Conf.				Overall
Team	W		L	PCT	W		L	PCT
No. 11 Auburn	12	–	2	.857	19	–	3	.864
No. 13 Georgia Tech	11	–	3	.786	22	–	6	.786
Kentucky	10	–	4	.714	18	–	7	.720
Ole Miss	8	–	6	.571	15	–	9	.625
Tulane	8	–	6	.571	13	–	11	.542
Vanderbilt	7	–	7	.500	14	–	9	.609
Tennessee	7	–	7	.500	12	–	11	.522
Georgia	6	–	8	.429	12	–	13	.480
Mississippi State	5	–	9	.357	12	–	13	.480
Alabama	4	–	10	.286	7	–	17	.292
Florida	3	–	11	.214	6	–	16	.273
LSU	3	–	11	.214	5	–	18	.217
Rankings from AP Poll

The 1959–60 Georgia Bulldogs basketball team represented the University of Georgia as a member of the Southeastern Conference (SEC) during the 1959–60 NCAA University Division men's basketball season. Led by ninth-year head coach Harbin Lawson, the Bulldogs compiled an overall record of 12–13 with a mark of 6–8 conference play, placing in eighth in the SEC. The team captain was Gordon Darrah.

== Roster ==
1959–60 Georgia Bulldogs men's basketball team
Players
Coaches

Pos.	#	Name	Height	Weight	Year	Previous school	Hometown
G		Phillip Simpson	6 ft 5 in (1.96 m)	—	Jr
G		Don Keiser	6 ft 4 in (1.93 m)	—	Jr
G		Gordon Darrah	6 ft 2 in (1.88 m)	—
C		John Johnson	6 ft 7 in (2.01 m)	—	Jr
G		Allan Johnson	5 ft 10 in (1.78 m)	—	So
F		Pat Casey	6 ft 4 in (1.93 m)	—	Jr
G		Ken Taylor	6 ft 3 in (1.91 m)	—	Jr
G		Frank Clark	5 ft 10 in (1.78 m)	—	So
G		Joey Miller	6 ft 1 in (1.85 m)	—	So
C		Peter Marsh	6 ft 9 in (2.06 m)	—
F		John Barnard	6 ft 3 in (1.91 m)	—
F		Dave Myrick	6 ft 2 in (1.88 m)	—
F		Clark Royer	6 ft 3 in (1.91 m)	—

Head coach

Harbin Lawson

Assistant coach(es)

Legend

- (C) Team captain
- (S) Suspended
- (I) Ineligible
- (W) Walk-on
- Injured
- Current redshirt

== Schedule ==
Date time, TV	Opponent	Result	Record	Site city, state
12/1/1959	Oglethorpe	W 68-50	1–0	Athens, GA
12/2/1959	at Georgia Southern	L 73-82	1–1	
12/12/1959	Florida	W 75-61	2–1	Athens, GA
12/15/1959	at Vanderbilt	L 67-79	2–2	
12/29/1959	LSU	W 79-67	3–2	Athens, GA
12/30/1959	Florida State	W 69-66	4–2	Athens, GA
12/31/1959	Georgia Tech	L 65-83	4–3	Athens, GA
1/2/1960	at Tulane	L 74-76	4–4	
1/4/1960	at LSU	L 77-81	4–5	
1/7/1960	Georgia Southern	W 83-75	5–5	Athens, GA
1/9/1960	Alabama	W 70-58	6–5	Athens, GA
1/13/1960	at Georgia Tech	L 64-80	6–6	
1/18/1960	Stetson	W 97-72	7–6	Athens, GA
1/23/1960	Auburn	W 68-59	8–6	Athens, GA
1/27/1960	Kentucky	L 60-84	8–7	Athens, GA
1/30/1960	Tennessee	W 69-62	9–7	Athens, GA
2/2/1960	South Carolina	W 66-65	10–7	Athens, GA
2/6/1960	at Auburn	L 45-72	10–8	
2/8/1960	at Alabama	L 60-64	10–9	
2/13/1960	at Mississippi State	W 67-62	11–9	
2/15/1960	at Ole Miss	L 63-65	11–10	
2/20/1960	Georgia Tech	L 68-69	11–11	Athens, GA
2/22/1960	Vanderbilt	L 75-80	11–12	Athens, GA
2/27/1960	at Florida	W 75-73	12–12	
2/29/1960	at Florida State	L 82-95	12–13	
*Non-conference game. (#) Tournament seedings in parentheses.
