= 1959–60 Kansas Jayhawks men's basketball team =

American college basketball season

1959–60 Kansas Jayhawks men's basketball

Big Eight Co-Champions

NCAA tournament, Regional Finals
- Conference: Big Eight Conference
- Record: 19–9 (10–4 Big 8)
- Head coach: Dick Harp (4th season)
- Assistant coaches: Jerry Waugh (4th season); Jack Wolfe (1st season)
- Home arena: Allen Fieldhouse

1959–60 Big Eight Conference men's basketball standings
	Conf.				Overall
Team	W		L	PCT	W		L	PCT
Kansas	10	–	4	.714	19	–	9	.679
Kansas State	10	–	4	.714	16	–	10	.615
Oklahoma	9	–	5	.643	14	–	11	.560
Colorado	7	–	7	.500	13	–	11	.542
Iowa State	7	–	7	.500	15	–	9	.625
Missouri	5	–	9	.357	12	–	13	.480
Oklahoma State	4	–	10	.286	10	–	15	.400
Nebraska	4	–	10	.286	7	–	17	.292
Rankings from AP Poll

The 1959–60 Kansas Jayhawks men's basketball team represented the University of Kansas during the 1959–60 college men's basketball season.

== Roster ==
- Wayne Hightower
- Bill Bridges
- Jerry Gardner
- Al Donaghue
- Bob Hickman
- Dee Ketchum
- Butch Myers
- Al Correll
- Jim Hoffman
- Dick Gisel
- Bill Goetze
- Bill Elstun
- Larry Sterlin
- Ken Hensley
- Howard Parker
- Pete Woodward

== Schedule ==
Date time, TV	Rank^{#}	Opponent^{#}	Result	Record	Site city, state
December 5*		at Northwestern	W 76–67	1-0	Welsh-Ryan Arena; Evanston, IL
December 7*		Texas Tech	W 85–71	2-0	Allen Fieldhouse; Lawrence, KS
December 11*		vs. North Carolina	L 49–60	2-1	Reynolds Coliseum; Raleigh, NC
December 12*		at NC State	W 80–58	3-1	Reynolds Coliseum; Raleigh, NC
December 14*		Kentucky	L 72–77 ^{OT}	3-2	Allen Fieldhouse; Lawrence, KS
December 18*		San Francisco	W 73–42	4-2	Allen Fieldhouse; Lawrence, KS
December 19*		vs. BYU	W 96–64	5-2	Ahearn Field House; Manhattan, KS
December 22*		at No. 7 Saint Louis	L 59–66	5-3	Kiel Auditorium; St. Louis, MO
December 28		vs. Oklahoma State	W 67–59	6-3	Municipal Auditorium; Kansas City, MO
December 29		vs. Oklahoma	W 55–54	7-3	Municipal Auditorium; Kansas City, MO
December 30		vs. Iowa State	L 70–83	7-4	Municipal Auditorium; Kansas City, MO
January 9		at Nebraska	W 60–47	8-4 (1-0)	Nebraska Coliseum; Stillwater, OK
January 11		at Colorado	L 61–65	8-5 (1-1)	Balch Fieldhouse; Boulder, CO
January 16		Missouri; Border War	W 79–63	9-5 (2-1)	Allen Fieldhouse; Lawrence, KS
January 18		Oklahoma State	L 49–62	9-6 (2-2)	Allen Fieldhouse; Lawrence, KS
January 23		at Iowa State	L 60–72	9-7 (2-3)	The Armory; Ames, IA
February 6		Iowa State	W 70–64	10-7 (3-3)	Allen Fieldhouse; Lawrence, KS
February 10		Kansas State; Sunflower Showdown	W 64–62	11-7 (4-3)	Allen Fieldhouse; Lawrence, KS
February 13		at Oklahoma State	W 64–52	12-7 (5-3)	Gallagher-Iba Arena; Stillwater, OK
February 15		at Oklahoma	W 54–53	13-7 (6-3)	Field House; Norman, OK
February 20		Colorado	W 75–67	14-7 (7-3)	Allen Fieldhouse; Lawrence, KS
February 24		at Kansas State; Sunflower Showdown	L 57–68	14-8 (7-4)	Ahearn Field House; Manhattan, KS
February 27		at Missouri; Border War	W 85–72	15-8 (8-4)	Brewer Fieldhouse; Columbia, MO
March 1		Oklahoma	W 65–52	16-8 (9-4)	Allen Fieldhouse; Lawrence, KS
March 7		Nebraska	W 79–74	17-8 (10-4)	Allen Fieldhouse; Lawrence, KS
March 9		at Kansas State	W 84–82	18-8	Ahearn Field House; Manhattan, KS
March 11		vs. Texas; NCAA regional semifinals	W 90–81	19-8	Ahearn Field House; Manhattan, KS
March 12		vs. No. 1 Cincinnati; NCAA Regional Finals	L 71–82	19-9	Ahearn Field House; Manhattan, KS
*Non-conference game. ^{#}Rankings from AP Poll. (#) Tournament seedings in parentheses.
