= 1960 ACC men's basketball tournament =

- Classification: Division I
- Season: 1959–60
- Teams: 8
- Site: Reynolds Coliseum; Raleigh, North Carolina
- Champions: Duke (1st title)
- Winning coach: Vic Bubas (1st title)
- MVP: Doug Kistler (Duke)

1959–60 ACC men's basketball standings
	Conf.				Overall
Team	W		L	PCT	W		L	PCT
North Carolina	12	–	2	.857	18	–	6	.750
No. 19 Wake Forest	12	–	2	.857	21	–	7	.750
Maryland	9	–	5	.643	15	–	8	.652
No. 18 Duke †	7	–	7	.500	17	–	11	.607
South Carolina	6	–	8	.429	10	–	16	.385
NC State	5	–	9	.357	11	–	15	.423
Clemson	4	–	10	.286	10	–	16	.385
Virginia	1	–	13	.071	6	–	18	.250
† 1960 ACC tournament winner Rankings from AP Poll

The 1960 Atlantic Coast Conference men's basketball tournament was held in Raleigh, North Carolina, at Reynolds Coliseum from March 3–5, 1960. Duke defeated Wake Forest, 63–59, to win their first ACC championship. Doug Kistler of Duke was named tournament MVP.

== Bracket ==
Quarterfinals; March 3
1	#16 North Carolina	84
8	Virginia	63
4	Duke	82
5	South Carolina	69
2	#18 Wake Forest	74
7	Clemson	59
3	Maryland	58
6	NC State	74

Semifinals; March 4
1	#16 North Carolina	69
4	Duke	71
2	#18 Wake Forest	71
6	NC State	66

Championship Game; March 5
4	Duke	63
2	#18 Wake Forest	59
