= 1959–60 Duke Blue Devils men's basketball team =

American college basketball season

1959–60 Duke Blue Devils men's basketball

ACC Tournament champion

NCAA University Division Tournament, Elite Eight
- Conference: Atlantic Coast Conference

Ranking
- Coaches: No. 15
- AP: No. 18
- Record: 17–11 (7–7 ACC)
- Head coach: Vic Bubas
- Assistant coach: Fred Shabel
- Home arena: Cameron Indoor Stadium

1959–60 ACC men's basketball standings
	Conf.				Overall
Team	W		L	PCT	W		L	PCT
North Carolina	12	–	2	.857	18	–	6	.750
No. 19 Wake Forest	12	–	2	.857	21	–	7	.750
Maryland	9	–	5	.643	15	–	8	.652
No. 18 Duke †	7	–	7	.500	17	–	11	.607
South Carolina	6	–	8	.429	10	–	16	.385
NC State	5	–	9	.357	11	–	15	.423
Clemson	4	–	10	.286	10	–	16	.385
Virginia	1	–	13	.071	6	–	18	.250
† 1960 ACC tournament winner Rankings from AP Poll

The 1959–60 Duke Blue Devils men's basketball team represented Duke University in the 1959–60 NCAA Division I men's basketball season. The head coach was Vic Bubas and the team finished the season with an overall record of 17–11.
