= Jack Rohan =

American basketball player and coach

John Patrick "Jack" Rohan (August 25, 1931 – August 9, 2004) was an American college basketball player and coach. The Bellerose, Queens native was men's head basketball coach at Columbia University between 1962 and 1974, and returned in 1991 to coach until 1995. He is the most successful coach in Columbia basketball history. Rohan was also a full professor and chairman of the department of physical education.

Rohan attended Columbia from 1949 to 1953, and was a member of the famous 1950/51 team under coach Lou Rossini that went undefeated through its regular season, winning all 22 of its games and capturing the Ivy League title with a 12–0 mark. Rohan earned a bachelor's degree in history from Columbia in 1953 and a master's from Teachers College, Columbia University, in 1957. From 1955 through 1958, he served variously as the varsity golf and freshman basketball coach at Columbia and the freshman basketball coach at New York University. In 1962 he became head coach at Columbia.

Rohan was selected national Coach of the Year for the 1967–68 season after leading Columbia to the Ivy League championship. That team, one of the best in Columbia history, compiled a 23–5 record and finished the season ranked sixth in the nation. It was led by Jim McMillian and Dave Newmark, both of whom played professional basketball, and Heyward Dotson, an NBA and ABA draftee. Rohan announced on February 18, 1974 his resignation as coach at season's end to become the tenured chair of the university's physical education department. He was succeeded by Tom Penders two months later on April 18. He became the school's golf coach in 1976, but remained active in basketball as a much-sought-after basketball camp lecturer and clinician, broadcaster, and writer.

In 1990 Rohan agreed to once again become head coach of the Lions. He coached for five years, leading the team to a 43–87 record, including a 16–10 record and second-place finish in the Ivy League in 1992–93. When he left the head coach's position, shortly after the conclusion of the 1995 season, he had compiled an overall record of 198–247. His games coached (445) and his victories both stand as Columbia career records.

Rohan died on August 9, 2004, aged 72, in a nursing home in South Yarmouth, Massachusetts, of complications from Guillain–Barré syndrome. He had been stricken with the disease since July 2003.
