= Lou Rossini =

American basketball player and coach

Biographical details
- Born: April 24, 1921; Bronx, New York, U.S.
- Died: October 21, 2005 (aged 84); Sewell, New Jersey, U.S.

Playing career
- 1940–1942: St. John's
- 1945–1947: Columbia

Coaching career (HC unless noted)
- 1950–1958: Columbia
- 1958–1971: NYU
- 1975–1979: St. Francis (NY)

Head coaching record
- Overall: 357–256
- Tournaments: 6–5 (NCAA University Division); 7–3 (NIT)

Accomplishments and honors

Championships
- EIBL (1951); Metropolitan New York (1960)

Lucio "Lou" Rossini (April 24, 1921 – October 21, 2005) was an American college basketball coach. He compiled a 357–256 record in almost 20 years of coaching, most notably with New York University (NYU).

In Rossini's first year as head coach with Columbia University, he guided them to a 21–1 record and an appearance in the 1951 NCAA basketball tournament. After Columbia, Rossini coached at NYU, leading them to three NCAA tournament appearances and four National Invitation Tournament (NIT) bids in 13 seasons. Rossini last coached in the NCAA for St. Francis College in Brooklyn, from 1975 to 1979, and had a 55–48 record. He also coached the Puerto Rican national team in the 1964 and 1968 Olympics and the Qatar national team in the 1980s. In 1959 he led the Capitanes de Arecibo a team in the Baloncesto Superior Nacional (Puerto Rico basketball league) to their first championship.

Two of his best players at NYU were Happy Hairston and Barry Kramer, who starred on the 1963 and 1964 teams. Hairston and Kramer advanced to professional careers.

Rossini died at his home in the Sewell section of Mantua Township, New Jersey, aged 84. The cause of death was Alzheimer's disease.

== Head coaching record ==
Record table
| Season | Team | Overall | Conference | Standing | Postseason |
|---|---|---|---|---|---|
Columbia Lions (Eastern Intercollegiate Basketball League) (1950–1954)
| 1950–51 | Columbia | 21–1 | 12–0 | 1st | NCAA first round |
| 1951–52 | Columbia | 12–10 | 7–5 | 4th | |
| 1952–53 | Columbia | 17–10 | 8–4 | 2nd | |
| 1953–54 | Columbia | 11–13 | 6–8 | 5th | |
Columbia Lions (Ivy League) (1954–1958)
| 1954–55 | Columbia | 17–8 | 10–4 | T–2nd | |
| 1955–56 | Columbia | 15–9 | 9–5 | T–2nd | |
| 1956–57 | Columbia | 18–6 | 9–5 | T–3rd | |
| 1957–58 | Columbia | 6–18 | 2–12 | 8th | |
| Columbia: | | 117–71 | 63–43 | | |
NYU Violets (Metropolitan New York Conference) (1958–1963)
| 1958–59 | NYU | 15–8 | 2–2 | T–4th | |
| 1959–60 | NYU | 22–5 | 4–0 | 1st | NCAA University Division Final Four |
| 1960–61 | NYU | 12–11 | 2–1 | T–2nd | |
| 1961–62 | NYU | 20–5 | 3–2 | 3rd | NCAA University Division Regional Third Place |
| 1962–63 | NYU | 18–5 | 3–1 | 2nd | NCAA University Division Regional Fourth Place |
NYU Violets (Independent) (1963–1965)
| 1963–64 | NYU | 17–10 | | | NIT semifinal |
| 1964–65 | NYU | 16–10 | | | NIT semifinal |
NYU Violets (Metropolitan Collegiate Conference) (1965–1967)
| 1965–66 | NYU | 18–10 | 7–2 | T–2nd | NIT Runner-up |
| 1966–67 | NYU | 10–6 | 6–3 | 4th | |
NYU Violets (Independent) (1967–1971)
| 1967–68 | NYU | 8–16 | | | |
| 1968–69 | NYU | 12–9 | | | |
| 1969–70 | NYU | 12–12 | | | |
| 1970–71 | NYU | 5–20 | | | |
| NYU: | | 185–127 | 27–11 | | |
St. Francis Terriers (NCAA Division I independent) (1975–1979)
| 1975–76 | St. Francis | 13–13 | | | |
| 1976–77 | St. Francis | 12–14 | | | |
| 1977–78 | St. Francis | 16–9 | | | |
| 1978–79 | St. Francis | 14–12 | | | |
| St. Francis: | | 55–48 | | | |
| Total: | | 357–256 | | | |
National champion Postseason invitational champion Conference regular season champion Conference regular season and conference tournament champion Division regular season champion Division regular season and conference tournament champion Conference tournament champion

== See also ==
- List of NCAA Division I Men's Final Four appearances by coach
