= George Smith (basketball) =

American basketball coach and administrator (1912–1996)

Biographical details
- Born: August 24, 1912
- Died: January 14, 1996 (aged 83)

Playing career

Football
- 1932–1935: Cincinnati

Coaching career (HC unless noted)

Football
- 1948: Cincinnati (assistant)

Basketball
- 1948–1952: Cincinnati (freshmen)
- 1952–1960: Cincinnati

Administrative career (AD unless noted)
- 1960–1973: Cincinnati

Head coaching record
- Overall: 154–56
- Tournaments: 7–3 (NCAA University Division); 2–2 (NIT)

Accomplishments and honors

Championships
- 2 NCAA Regional – Final Four (1959, 1960); 3 MVC (1958–1960)

Awards
- 2× MVC Coach of the Year (1958, 1959)

George Daniel Smith (August 24, 1912 – January 14, 1996) was an American basketball coach and college athletic administrator. He served as the head basketball coach at the University of Cincinnati from 1952 to 1960, compiling a record of 154–56. Smith was the athletic director at Cincinnati from 1960 to 1973. He died of cancer at the age of 83, on January 14, 1996.

== Head coaching record ==
Record table
Season	Team	Overall	Conference	Standing	Postseason
Cincinnati Bearcats (Mid-American Conference) (1952–1953)
1952–53	Cincinnati	11–13	9–3	2nd	
Cincinnati Bearcats (NCAA University Division independent) (1953–1957)
1953–54	Cincinnati	11–10			
1954–55	Cincinnati	21–8			NIT Third Place
1955–56	Cincinnati	17–7			
1956–57	Cincinnati	15–9			NIT First Round
Cincinnati Bearcats (Missouri Valley Conference) (1957–1960)
1957–58	Cincinnati	25–3	13–1	1st	NCAA University Division Regional Third Place
1958–59	Cincinnati	26–4	13–1	1st	NCAA University Division Third Place
1959–60	Cincinnati	28–2	13–1	1st	NCAA University Division Third Place
Cincinnati:		154–56	48–6		
Total:		154–56			
National champion Postseason invitational champion Conference regular season champion Conference regular season and conference tournament champion Division regular season champion Division regular season and conference tournament champion Conference tournament champion

== See also ==
- List of NCAA Division I men's basketball tournament Final Four appearances by coach
