= 1959–60 Ohio Bobcats men's basketball team =

American college basketball season

1959–60 Ohio Bobcats men's basketball

MAC Regular Season champions

NCAA tournament, Sweet Sixteen
- Conference: Mid-American Conference
- Record: 17–8 (10–2 MAC)
- Head coach: Jim Snyder (11th season)
- Home arena: Men's Gymnasium

1959–60 Mid-American Conference men's basketball standings
	Conf.				Overall
Team	W		L	PCT	W		L	PCT
Ohio	10	–	2	.833	16	–	8	.667
Toledo	9	–	3	.750	18	–	6	.750
Bowling Green State	6	–	6	.500	10	–	14	.417
Miami (Ohio)	6	–	6	.500	8	–	16	.333
Western Michigan	5	–	7	.417	13	–	11	.542
Marshall	4	–	8	.333	10	–	13	.435
Kent State	2	–	10	.167	7	–	16	.304
Rankings from AP Poll

The 1959–60 Ohio Bobcats men's basketball team represented Ohio University as a member of the Mid-American Conference in the college basketball season of 1959–60. The team was coached by Jim Snyder and played their home games at the Men's Gymnasium. The Bobcats finished the regular season with a record of 16–6 and won MAC regular season title with a conference record of 10–2. They received a bid to the NCAA tournament. There they defeated Notre Dame before losing to Georgia Tech in the Sweet Sixteen.

== Schedule ==
Date time, TV	Rank^{#}	Opponent^{#}	Result	Record	Site (attendance) city, state
Regular Season
12/1/1959*		at West Virginia Wesleyan	W 73–72	1–0	
12/3/1959*		at Marietta	W 89–72	2–0	
12/8/1959*		at Morehead State	W 76–65	3–0	
12/12/1959*		at Indiana	L 68–80	3–1	
12/17/1959*		at DePaul	L 54–77	3–2	
12/19/1959*		at Illinois	L 79–85	3–3	
MAC regular season
1/2/1960		at No. 16 Toledo	L 53–63	3–4 (0–1)	
1/5/1960		Miami (OH)	W 104–89	4–4 (1–1)	
1/9/1960		at Bowling Green	W 86–72	5–4 (2–1)	
1/12/1960		at Marshall	W 87–77	6–4 (3–1)	
1/16/1960		Western Michigan	W 88–70	7–4 (4–1)	
1/18/1960*		St. Francis (PA)	W 82–79	8–4	
1/23/1960		Kent State	W 100–72	9–4 (5–1)	
1/30/1960		at Western Michigan	W 86–71	10–4 (6–1)	
2/6/1960		Marshall	W 86–82	11–-4 (7–1)	
2/9/1960*		Stewart AFB	W 95–74	12–-4	
2/12/1960		at Kent State	W 84–68	13–4 (8–1)	
2/15/1960		No. 12 Toledo	W 71–67	14–4 (9–1)	
2/20/1960	No. 18	Bowling Green	W 85–70	15–4 (10–1)	
2/23/1960	No. 18	at Miami (OH)	L 74–88	15–5 (10–2)	
2/29/1960*		Morehead State	W 96–66	16–5	
3/2/1960*		Marietta	L 66–74	16–6	
NCAA tournament
3/8/1969*		vs. Notre Dame	W 74–66	17–6	
3/11/1960*		vs. No. 13 Georgia Tech; Sweet Sixteen	L 54–57	17–7	
3/12/1960*		vs. Western Kentucky; Regional Consolation	L 87–97	17–8	
*Non-conference game. ^{#}Rankings from AP Poll. (#) Tournament seedings in parentheses. All times are in Eastern Time.

== Statistics ==
=== Team statistics ===
Final 1959–60 statistics

Record	Ohio	OPP
Scoring	1902	1779
Scoring Average	79.25	74.13
Field goals – Att	760–1780	679–1674
Free throws – Att	382–643	421–621
Rebounds	1397	1079
Assists		
Turnovers		
Steals		
Blocked Shots		

=== Player statistics ===
			Minutes		Scoring		Total FGs			Free-Throws			Rebounds						
Player	GP	GS	Tot	Avg	Pts	Avg	FG	FGA	Pct	FT	FTA	Pct	Tot	Avg	A	PF	TO	Stl	Blk
Bunk Adams	25	-			411	16.4	166	393	0.422	79	167	0.473	274	11.0		67			
Howie Jolliff	25	-			400	16.0	165	364	0.453	70	122	0.574	445	17.8		87			
Larry Kruger	24	-			393	16.4	158	333	0.474	77	100	0.770	188	7.8		54			
Billy Whaley	25	-			283	11.3	108	250	0.432	67	96	0.698	0	0.0		0			
Dale Bandy	25	-			165	6.6	63	0	0.000	39	0	0.000	0	0.0		0			
Bruce Johnson	14	-			118	8.4	44	0	0.000	30	0	0.000	0	0.0		0			
Dave Katz	21	-			74	3.5	29	103	0.282	16	22	0.727	0	0.0		0			
Verlyn Witte	18	-			60	3.3	27	46	0.587	6	10	0.600	0	0.0		0			
Loren Wilcox	16	-			40	2.5	15	53	0.283	10	28	0.357	0	0.0		0			
Bob Gaunt	14	-			35	2.5	12	0	0.000	11	0	0.000	0	0.0		0			
_ Calhoun		-																	
Murray Cook		-																	
Mike Schuler		-																	
Total	24	-	-	-	1902	79.3	760	1780	0.427	382	643	0.594	1397	58.2		428			
Opponents	24	-	-	-	1779	74.1	679	1674	0.406	421	621	0.678	1079	45.0		451			

Legend
GP	Games played	GS	Games started	Avg	Average per game
FG	Field-goals made	FGA	Field-goal attempts	Off	Offensive rebounds
Def	Defensive rebounds	A	Assists	TO	Turnovers
Blk	Blocks	Stl	Steals	High	Team high
