= 1959–60 Connecticut Huskies men's basketball team =

American college basketball season

1959–60 Connecticut Huskies men's basketball

Yankee Conference Regular Season Champions

NCAA University Division Tournament, First Round
- Conference: Yankee Conference
- Record: 17–9 (8–2 YC)
- Head coach: Hugh Greer (14th season)
- Assistant coach: Nick Rodis
- Home arena: Hugh S. Greer Field House

1959–60 Yankee Conference men's basketball standings
	Conf.				Overall
Team	W		L	PCT	W		L	PCT
Connecticut	8	–	2	.800	17	–	9	.654
Maine	6	–	4	.600	19	–	4	.826
Massachusetts	6	–	4	.600	14	–	10	.583
Rhode Island	6	–	4	.600	12	–	14	.462
Vermont	2	–	8	.200	9	–	11	.450
New Hampshire	2	–	8	.200	9	–	14	.391

The 1959–60 Connecticut Huskies men's basketball team represented the University of Connecticut in the 1959–60 collegiate men's basketball season. The Huskies completed the season with a 17–9 overall record. The Huskies were members of the Yankee Conference, where they ended the season with an 8–2 record. They were the Yankee Conference regular season champions and made it to the first round in the 1960 NCAA Division I men's basketball tournament. The Huskies played their home games at Hugh S. Greer Field House in Storrs, Connecticut, and were led by fourteenth-year head coach Hugh Greer.

== Schedule ==
Date time, TV	Rank^{#}	Opponent^{#}	Result	Record	Site (attendance) city, state
Regular Season
12/1/1959*		American International	W 82–52	1–0	Hugh S. Greer Field House; Storrs, CT
12/5/1959*		Yale	W 66–55	2–0	Hugh S. Greer Field House; Storrs, CT
12/9/1959		at New Hampshire	W 75–51	3–0 (1–0)	Lundholm Gym; Durham, NH
12/12/1959*		Boston College	W 84–67	4–0	Hugh S. Greer Field House; Storrs, CT
12/15/1959		at Massachusetts	L 60–62	4–1 (1–1)	Curry Hicks Cage; Amherst, MA
12/19/1959*		at Rutgers	W 74–62	5–1	College Avenue Gymnasium; Newark, NJ
12/22/1959*		Santa Clara	L 47–54	5–2	Hugh S. Greer Field House; Storrs, CT
1/2/1960*		at Fordham	W 80–66	6–2	Rose Hill Gymnasium; Bronx, NY
1/5/1960		New Hampshire	W 75–52	7–2 (2–1)	Hugh S. Greer Field House; Storrs, CT
1/9/1960*		Holy Cross	L 49–52	7–3	Hugh S. Greer Field House; Storrs, CT
1/13/1960*		Boston University	W 78–60	8–3	Hugh S. Greer Field House; Storrs, CT
1/16/1960*		at Niagara	L 72–112	8–4	Gallagher Center; Lewiston, NY
1/30/1960*		Manhattan	W 64–56	9–4	Hugh S. Greer Field House; Storrs, CT
2/2/1960*		at Syracuse; Rivalry	L 64–65	9–5	Oncenter War Memorial Arena; Syracuse, NY
2/4/1960		at Vermont	W 71–65	10–5 (3–1)	Burlington, VT
2/6/1960		at Maine	L 74–75	10–6 (3–2)	Memorial Gymnasium; Orono, ME
2/9/1960		at Rhode Island	W 66–62	11–6 (4–2)	Keaney Gymnasium; Kingston, RI
2/12/1960		Maine	W 91–79	12–6 (5–2)	Hugh S. Greer Field House; Storrs, CT
2/13/1960*		at Temple	L 67–69	12–7	Philadelphia, PA
2/16/1960		Massachusetts	W 71–49	13–7 (6–2)	Hugh S. Greer Field House; Storrs, CT
2/20/1960*		at Holy Cross	L 66–98	13–8	Worcester, MA
2/23/1960*		Canisius	W 96–66	14–8	Hugh S. Greer Field House; Storrs, CT
2/27/1960		Vermont	W 84–73	15–8 (7–2)	Hugh S. Greer Field House; Storrs, CT
3/3/1960*		Colgate	W 93–67	16–8	Hugh S. Greer Field House; Storrs, CT
3/5/1960		Rhode Island	W 95–79	17–8 (8–2)	Hugh S. Greer Field House; Storrs, CT
NCAA Tournament
3/8/1960*		vs. NYU; First Round	L 59–78	17–9	Madison Square Garden; New York, NY
*Non-conference game. ^{#}Rankings from AP Poll. (#) Tournament seedings in parentheses. All times are in Eastern Time.

Schedule Source:
