= 1959–60 St. Francis Terriers men's basketball team =

American college basketball season

1959–60 St. Francis Terriers men's basketball
- Conference: Metropolitan New York Conference
- Record: 13–8 (2–1 MTNY)
- Head coach: Daniel Lynch (12th season)
- Home arena: II Corps Artillery Armory

1959–60 Metropolitan New York Conference men's basketball standings
	Conf.				Overall
Team	W		L	PCT	W		L	PCT
No. 12 NYU	4	–	0	1.000	22	–	5	.815
No. 20 St. John's	5	–	1	.833	17	–	8	.680
St. Francis (NY)	2	–	1	.667	13	–	8	.619
Manhattan	2	–	2	.500	13	–	11	.542
Fordham	1	–	3	.250	8	–	18	.308
CCNY	1	–	5	.167	4	–	14	.222
Brooklyn	0	–	3	.000	5	–	13	.278
Rankings from AP Poll

The 1959–60 St. Francis Terriers men's basketball team represented St. Francis College during the 1959–60 NCAA men's basketball season. The team was coached by Daniel Lynch, who was in his twelfth year at the helm of the St. Francis Terriers. The team was a member of the Metropolitan New York Conference and played their home games at the II Corps Artillery Armory in Park Slope, Brooklyn.

The Terriers finished the season at 13–8 overall and 2–1 in conference play. The Terriers squad was led by Richie Dreyer, the leading scorer and rebounder.

== Roster ==
1959–60 St. Francis Brooklyn Terriers men's basketball team
Players
Coaches

Pos.	#	Name	Height	Weight	Year	Previous school	Hometown
F		Richard Dreyer	6 ft 2 in (1.88 m)	—	Jr	Aviation Trades High School
G		Dave Lopez	6 ft 2 in (1.88 m)	—	So
C		Pete Schweitzer	6 ft 4 in (1.93 m)	—	Jr
F		George Davey	5 ft 10 in (1.78 m)	—	Jr
G		Fred Schneider	6 ft 0 in (1.83 m)	—	Sr
G		John Daly	6 ft 1 in (1.85 m)	—	Jr
G		Tom Rooney	5 ft 10 in (1.78 m)	—
C		John Enright	6 ft 5 in (1.96 m)	—	So
F		Sal Messineo	6 ft 3 in (1.91 m)	—	Jr
G		Henry O'Lee	6 ft 0 in (1.83 m)	—	Jr
G		John Meudt	6 ft 0 in (1.83 m)	205 lb (93 kg)	Sr

Head coach

- Daniel Lynch (St. Francis '38)

Assistant coach(es)

Legend

- (C) Team captain
- (S) Suspended
- (I) Ineligible
- (W) Walk-on
- Injured
- Current redshirt

== Schedule and results ==
Date time, TV	Opponent	Result	Record	Site city, state
Regular Season
December 1, 1959*	at Hunter	W 80–62	1–0	Bronx, NY
December 5, 1959*	C.W. Post	W 75–50	2–0	II Corps Artillery Armory; Brooklyn, NY
December 8, 1959*	Loyola (MD)	W 69–65	3–0	II Corps Artillery Armory; Brooklyn, NY
December 12, 1959*	at Providence	L 63–75	3–1	Mullaney Gymnasium; Providence, RI
December 14, 1959*	at Fairfield	L 59–83	3–2	Fairfield, CT
December 19, 1959*	Adelphi	L 62–83	3–3	II Corps Artillery Armory; Brooklyn, NY
December 22, 1959*	at Fairleigh Dickinson	W 67–60	4–3	Rutherford, NJ
January 2, 1960*	Siena	W 80–60	5–3	II Corps Artillery Armory; Brooklyn, NY
January 5, 1960*	Saint Peter's	W 84–64	6–3	II Corps Artillery Armory; Brooklyn, NY
January 8, 1960	at Brooklyn	W 76–60	7–3 (1–0)	Roosevelt Gymnasium; Brooklyn, NY
January 12, 1960*	Pace	W 89–77	8–3	II Corps Artillery Armory; Brooklyn, NY
January 16, 1960*	at Seton Hall	L 83–85	8–4	Walsh Gymnasium; South Orange, NJ
January 31, 1960*; 3:30 pm	at Siena	W 60–56	9–4	Washington Avenue Armory; Albany, NY
February 2, 1960*	Pratt	W 70–61	10–4	II Corps Artillery Armory; Brooklyn, NY
February 5, 1960*; 8:30 pm	Le Moyne	L 66–77	10–5	II Corps Artillery Armory; Brooklyn, NY
February 8, 1960*	at Bridgeport	L 70–95	10–6	Bridgeport, CT
February 15, 1960*	Iona	L 44–80	10–7	II Corps Artillery Armory; Brooklyn, NY
February 17, 1960*	at Queens	W 78–77	11–7	Fitzgerald Gymnasium; Flushing, NY
February 20, 1960	vs. No. 15 St. John's	L 61–86	11–8 (1–1)	69th Regiment Armory; New York, NY
February 23, 1960*	Yeshiva	W 61–54	12–8	II Corps Artillery Armory; Brooklyn, NY
February 27, 1960	C.C.N.Y.	W 55–47	13–8 (2–1)	II Corps Artillery Armory; Brooklyn, NY
*Non-conference game. ^{#}Rankings from AP Poll. (#) Tournament seedings in parentheses. All times are in Eastern Time.
