= 1959–60 St. John's Redmen basketball team =

American college basketball season

1959–60 St. John's Redmen men's basketball

NIT, Quarterfinal
- Conference: Metropolitan New York Conference

Ranking
- AP: No. 20
- Record: 17–8 (5–1 Metropolitan New York)
- Head coach: Joe Lapchick (15th season)
- Assistant coach: Lou Carnesecca (2nd season)
- Captain: Tony Jackson
- Home arena: Madison Square Garden

1959–60 Metropolitan New York Conference men's basketball standings
	Conf.				Overall
Team	W		L	PCT	W		L	PCT
No. 12 NYU	4	–	0	1.000	22	–	5	.815
No. 20 St. John's	5	–	1	.833	17	–	8	.680
St. Francis (NY)	2	–	1	.667	13	–	8	.619
Manhattan	2	–	2	.500	13	–	11	.542
Fordham	1	–	3	.250	8	–	18	.308
CCNY	1	–	5	.167	4	–	14	.222
Brooklyn	0	–	3	.000	5	–	13	.278
Rankings from AP Poll

The 1959–60 St. John's Redmen basketball team represented St. John's University during the 1959–60 college basketball season.

The Redmen lost to St. Bonaventure in the quarterfinals of the NIT.

== Roster ==
#	Name	Height	Position	Class	Hometown	Previous Team(s)
10	Bob Larranaga	6'2"	G	So.	Bronx, NY, U.S.	St. Helena's HS
14	Gary Marozas	6'6"	F/C	Jr.	Queens, NY, U.S.	Forest Hills HS
15	Bill Goldy	N/A	G	So.	Blackwood, NJ, U.S.	Gloucester Catholic HS
20	Willie Hall	6'4"	G/F	So.	New York, NY, U.S.	Archbishop Molloy HS
21	Mike Pedone	6'0"	G	Sr.	Jersey City, NJ, U.S.	St. Peter's Prep
23	Kevin Loughery (DNP)	6'3"	G	Jr.	Bronx, NY, U.S.	Cardinal Hayes HS/Boston College
24	Tony Jackson	6"4"	G/F	Jr.	Brooklyn, NY, U.S.	Thomas Jefferson HS
25	Bernie Pascal	6'5"	F	Sr.	Brooklyn, NY, U.S.	St. Francis Prep
	Leroy Ellis	6"11"	C	So.	Brooklyn, NY, U.S.	Thomas Jefferson HS
30	Fred Edelman	6"4"	G/F	So.	Queens, NY, U.S.	Forest Hills HS
33	Ivan Kovac	5"11"	G	So.	Queens, NY, U.S.	Bayside HS
	Butch Dellacave	5'9"	G	Jr.	Brooklyn, NY, U.S.	St. John's Prep
	Frank O'Hara	N/A	G	So.	N/A	N/A

== Schedule and results ==
Date time, TV	Rank^{#}	Opponent^{#}	Result	Record	Site city, state
Regular Season
December 1, 1959*		at Bridgeport	W 90–66	1–0	Harvey Hubball Gymnasium; Bridgeport, CT
December 3, 1959*		Saint Louis	L 67–76	1–1	Madison Square Garden; New York, NY
December 7, 1959*		Fairleigh Dickinson	W 101–80	2–1	Martin Van Buren High School; Queens, NY
December 11, 1959*		at Pittsburgh; Steel Bowl Tourney	L 73–74	1–2	Fitzgerald Field House; Pittsburgh, PA
December 12, 1959*		vs. William & Mary; Steel Bowl Tourney	W 77–65	3–2	Fitzgerald Field House; Pittsburgh, PA
December 15, 1959		Brooklyn College	W 88–49	4–2	Martin Van Buren High School; Queens, NY
December 19, 1959*		Providence	W 67–64 ^{OT}	5–2	Madison Square Garden; New York, NY
December 26, 1959*		vs. No. 19 Iowa; ECAC Holiday Festival	L 84–91	5–3	Madison Square Garden; New York, NY
December 28, 1959*		vs. Dartmouth; ECAC Holiday Festival	W 73–66	6–3	Madison Square Garden; New York, NY
December 30, 1959*		vs. St. Bonaventure; ECAC Holiday Festival	L 78–95	6–4	Madison Square Garden; New York, NY
January 7, 1960*		St. Joseph's	L 77–82	6–5	Madison Square Garden; New York, NY
January 15, 1960*		vs. George Washington	W 87–78	7–5	69th Regiment Armory; New York, NY
January 23, 1960*		at Army	W 78–64	8–5	USMA Fieldhouse; West Point, NY
January 28, 1960*		at Marquette	W 69–63	9–5	Milwaukee Arena; Milwaukee, WI
January 30, 1960*		at Loyola (IL)	W 74–59	10–5	Alumni Gym; Chicago, IL
February 4, 1960*		Syracuse	W 85–68	11–5	Madison Square Garden; New York, NY
February 6, 1960*		at Niagara	W 79–71	12–5	NU Student Center; Lewiston, NY
February 11, 1960*		No. 5 West Virginia	W 79–73	13–5	Madison Square Garden; New York, NY
February 13, 1960		vs. Fordham	W 83–64	14–5	69th Regiment Armory; New York, NY
February 15, 1960		at CCNY	W 93–67	15–5	Nate Holman Gymnasium; New York, NY
February 20, 1960	No. 15	vs. St. Francis (NY)	W 86–61	16–5	69th Regiment Armory; New York, NY
February 25, 1960	No. 11	vs. Manhattan	W 80–63	17–5	Madison Square Garden; New York, NY
February 27, 1960*		at Temple	L 63–68 ^{OT}	17–6	The Palestra; Philadelphia, PA
March 3, 1960	No. 19	vs. No. 14 NYU	L 67–74	17–7	Madison Square Garden; New York, NY
NIT
March 15, 1960*	No. 20	vs. No. 9 St. Bonaventure; NIT Quarterfinal	L 71-106	17-8	Madison Square Garden; New York, NY
*Non-conference game. ^{#}Rankings from AP Poll. (#) Tournament seedings in parentheses.
