= 1959–60 Western Kentucky State Hilltoppers basketball team =

American college basketball season

1959–60 Western Kentucky State Hilltoppers basketball

Ohio Valley Conference Champion Sugar Bowl Tournament Champion

NCAA Tournament, Sweet Sixteen Mideast Region 3rd Place
- Conference: Ohio Valley Conference
- Record: 21–7 (10–2 OVC)
- Head coach: Edgar Diddle (38th season)
- Assistant coach: Ted Hornback
- Home arena: Health & Physical Education Building

The 1959–60 Western Kentucky State Hilltoppers men's basketball team represented Western Kentucky State College (now known as Western Kentucky University) during the 1959-60 NCAA University Division Basketball season. The Hilltoppers were led by future Naismith Memorial Basketball Hall of Fame coach Edgar Diddle. The Hilltoppers won the Ohio Valley Conference championship, as well as the conference's automatic bid to the 1960 NCAA University Division basketball tournament, where they advanced to the Sweet Sixteen. This team was very balanced, with four players being named to the All-Conference Team: Charlie Osborne, Bobby Rascoe, Al Ellison, and Don Parsons.

== Schedule ==
Date time, TV	Rank^{#}	Opponent^{#}	Result	Record	Site city, state
Regular Season
12/3/1959*		Union (TN)	W 123–71	1–0	Health & Physical Education Building; Bowling Green, KY
12/5/1959*		Northwest Louisiana	W 89–60	2–0	Health & Physical Education Building; Bowling Green, KY
12/10/1959*		vs. Seton Hall	W 78–69	3–0	Madison Square Garden; New York, NY
12/12/1959*		at Illinois	L 80–93	3–1	Huff Hall; Champaign, IL
12/15/1959		Morehead State	W 70–68	4–1 (1-0)	Health & Physical Education Building; Bowling Green, KY
12/19/1959		at East Tennessee	W 103–77	5–1 (2-0)	Brooks Gymnasium; Johnson City, TN
12/29/1959*		vs. Mississippi State; Sugar Bowl Tournament	W 61–50	6–1	Tulane Gym; New Orleans, LA
12/30/1959*		at Tulane; Sugar Bowl Tournament	W 71–67	7–1	Tulane Gym; New Orleans, LA
1/6/1960*	No. 18	at DePaul	W 86–65	8–1	Health & Physical Education Building; Bowling Green, KY
1/9/1960	No. 18	at Eastern Kentucky	L 73–80	8–2 (2-1)	Alumni Coliseum; Richmond, KY
1/12/1960	No. 18	Tennessee Tech	W 71–67	9–2 (3-1)	Health & Physical Education Building; Bowling Green, KY
1/16/1960		at Murray State	L 72–87	9–3 (3-2)	Racer Arena; Murray, KY
1/20/1960*		at Xavier	L 66–76	9–4	Schmidt Fieldhouse; Cincinnati, OH
1/23/1960*		Bowling Green	W 85–61	10–4	Health & Physical Education Building; Bowling Green, KY
1/28/1960*		at Marshall	L 97–100 ^{OT}	10–5	Memorial Field House; Huntington, WV
1/30/1960*		at La Salle	W 76–70	11–5	Convention Hall; Philadelphia, PA
2/6/1960		at Middle Tennessee	W 109–89	12–5 (4-2)	Alumni Memorial Gym; Murfreesboro, TN
2/10/1960*		Xavier	L 73–82	12–6	Health & Physical Education Building; Bowling Green, KY
2/13/1960		at Morehead State	W 85–72	13–6 (5-2)	Wetherby Gymnasium; Morehead, KY
2/16/1960		Eastern Kentucky	W 38–20	14–6 (6-2)	Health & Physical Education Building; Bowling Green, KY
2/20/1960		Murray State	W 65–57	15–6 (7-2)	Health & Physical Education Building; Bowling Green, KY
2/23/1960		at Tennessee Tech	W 85–81	16–6 (8-2)	Memorial Gymnasium; Cookeville, TN
2/27/1960		Middle Tennessee	W 109–80	17–6 (9-2)	Health & Physical Education Building; Bowling Green, KY
2/29/1960*		Kent State	W 69–60	18–6	Health & Physical Education Building; Bowling Green, KY
3/2/1960		East Tennessee	W 83–69	19–6 (10-2)	Health & Physical Education Building; Bowling Green, KY
1960 NCAA University Division basketball tournament
3/8/1960*		vs. No. 10 Miami (FL); Mideast Region First Round	W 107–84	20–6	Memorial Coliseum; Lexington, KY
3/11/1960*		vs. No. 3 Ohio State; Sweet Sixteen	L 79–98	20–7	Freedom Hall; Louisville, KY
3/12/1960*		vs. Ohio; Mideast Region Consolation	W 97–87	21–7	Freedom Hall; Louisville, KY
*Non-conference game. ^{#}Rankings from AP Poll. (#) Tournament seedings in parentheses.
