= 1959–60 Atlantic Coast Conference men's basketball season =

== Final standings ==
Team	ACC Regular Season	ACC %	All Games	All Games %	Nonconference Games	Nonconference Games %	Ranked AP All	Ranked AP Nonconference
North Carolina	12–2	.857	18–6	.750				
Wake Forest	12–2	.857	21–7	.750				
Maryland	9–5	.643	15–8	.652				
Duke	7–7	.500	17–11	.607				
South Carolina	6–8	.429	10–16	.385				
NC State	5–9	.357	11–15	.423				
Clemson	4–10	.286	10–16	.385				
Virginia	1–13	.071	6–18	.250				
Total			108–97	.527				

== ACC tournament ==
See 1960 ACC men's basketball tournament

== NCAA tournament ==
=== Round of 25 ===
Duke 84, Princeton 60

=== Regional semi-finals ===
Duke 58, Saint Joseph's 56

=== Regional finals ===
New York U 74, Duke 59

=== ACC's NCAA record ===
2–1

== NIT ==
League rules prevented ACC teams from playing in the NIT, 1954–1966
