= 1960 NCAA University Division basketball tournament =

Edition of USA college basketball tournament

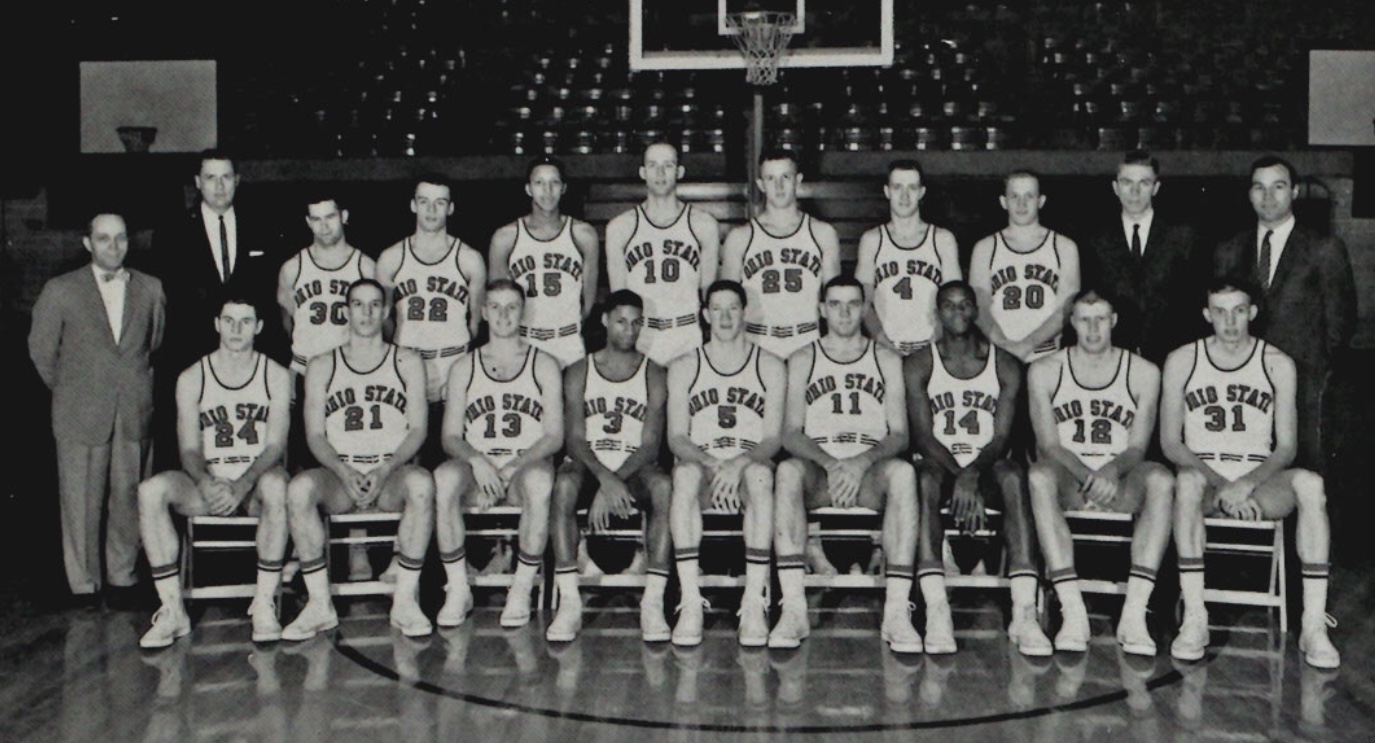
- Ohio State, champions
- Season: 1959–60
- Teams: 25
- Finals site: Cow Palace, Daly City, California
- Champions: Ohio State Buckeyes (1st title, 2nd title game, 5th Final Four)
- Runner-up: California Golden Bears (2nd title game, 3rd Final Four)
- Semifinalists: Cincinnati Bearcats (2nd Final Four); NYU Violets (2nd Final Four)
- Winning coach: Fred Taylor (1st title)
- MOP: Jerry Lucas (Ohio State)
- Attendance: 155,491
- Top scorer: Oscar Robertson (Cincinnati) (122 points)

The 1960 NCAA University Division basketball tournament involved 25 schools playing in single-elimination play to determine the national champion of men's NCAA Division I college basketball in the United States. The 22nd annual edition of the tournament began on March 7, 1960, and ended with the championship game on March 19, at the Cow Palace in Daly City, California (immediately south of San Francisco). A total of 29 games were played, including a third-place game in each region and a national third-place game.

Ohio State, coached by Fred Taylor, won the national title with a 75–55 victory in the final game over California, coached by Pete Newell. Jerry Lucas of Ohio State was named the tournament's Most Outstanding Player.

== Locations ==
Round	Region	Site	Venue	Host
First round	East	New York, New York	Madison Square Garden	
First round	Mideast	Lexington, Kentucky	Memorial Coliseum	Kentucky
First round	Midwest	Chicago, Illinois	Alumni Hall	DePaul
First round	West	Corvallis, Oregon	Oregon State Coliseum	Oregon State
First round	West	Provo, Utah	Smith Fieldhouse	Brigham Young
Regionals	East	Charlotte, North Carolina	Charlotte Coliseum	
Regionals	Mideast	Louisville, Kentucky	Freedom Hall	Louisville
Regionals	Midwest	Manhattan, Kansas	Ahearn Field House	Kansas State
Regionals	West	Seattle, Washington	Hec Edmundson Pavilion	Washington
Final Four		San Francisco, California	Cow Palace	

== Teams ==
Region	Team	Coach	Conference	Finished	Final Opponent	Score
East
East	Connecticut	Hugh Greer	Yankee	First round	NYU	L 78–59
East	Duke	Vic Bubas	Atlantic Coast	Regional Runner-up	NYU	L 74–59
East	Navy	Ben Carnevale	Independent	First round	West Virginia	L 94–86
East	NYU	Lou Rossini	Metro NY	Fourth Place	Cincinnati	L 95–71
East	Princeton	Franklin Cappon	Ivy League	First round	Duke	L 84–60
East	Saint Joseph's	Jack Ramsay	Middle Atlantic	Regional Fourth Place	West Virginia	L 106–100
East	West Virginia	Fred Schaus	Southern	Regional third place	Saint Joseph's	W 106–100
Mideast
Mideast	Georgia Tech	Whack Hyder	Southeastern	Regional Runner-up	Ohio State	L 86–69
Mideast	Miami	Bruce Hale	Independent	First round	Western Kentucky	L 107–84
Mideast	Notre Dame	John Jordan	Independent	First round	Ohio	L 74–66
Mideast	Ohio	James Snyder	Mid-American	Regional Fourth Place	Western Kentucky	L 97–87
Mideast	Ohio State	Fred Taylor	Big Ten	Champion	California	W 75–55
Mideast	Western Kentucky	Ed Diddle	Ohio Valley	Regional third place	Ohio	W 97–87
Midwest
Midwest	Air Force	Bob Spear	Independent	First round	DePaul	L 69–63
Midwest	Cincinnati	George Smith	Missouri Valley	Third Place	NYU	W 95–71
Midwest	DePaul	Ray Meyer	Independent	Regional third place	Texas	W 67–61
Midwest	Kansas	Dick Harp	Big 8	Regional Runner-up	Cincinnati	L 82–71
Midwest	Texas	Harold Bradley	Southwest	Regional Fourth Place	DePaul	L 67–61
West
West	California	Pete Newell	AAWU	Runner Up	Ohio State	L 75–55
West	Idaho State	John Evans	Independent	First round	California	L 71–44
West	New Mexico State	Presley Askew	Border	First round	Oregon	L 68–60
West	Oregon	Steve Belko	Independent	Regional Runner-up	California	L 70–49
West	Santa Clara	Bob Feerick	West Coast Athletic	Regional Fourth Place	Utah	L 89–81
West	USC	Forrest Twogood	AAWU	First round	Utah	L 80–73
West	Utah	Jack Gardner	Mountain States	Regional third place	Santa Clara	W 89–81

== Bracket ==
* – Denotes overtime period

=== East region ===
Quarterfinals
Duke	84
Princeton	60
West Virginia	94
Navy	86
NYU	78
Connecticut	59

Semifinals
Duke	58
Saint Joseph's	56
West Virginia	81*
NYU	82

Finals
Duke	59
NYU	74

=== Mideast region ===
Quarterfinals
Ohio	74
Notre Dame	66
Western Kentucky	107
Miami (FL)	84

Semifinals
Georgia Tech	57
Ohio	54
Ohio State	98
Western Kentucky	79

Finals
Georgia Tech	69
Ohio State	86

=== Midwest region ===
Quarterfinals
DePaul	69
Air Force	63

Semifinals
Cincinnati	99
DePaul	59
Kansas	90
Texas	81

Finals
Cincinnati	82
Kansas	71

=== West region ===
Quarterfinals
California	71
Idaho State	44
Oregon	68
New Mexico State	60
Utah	80
USC	73

Semifinals
Santa Clara	49
California	69
Oregon	65
Utah	54

Finals
California	70
Oregon	49

=== Final Four ===
National Semifinals
E	NYU	54
ME	Ohio State	76
MW	Cincinnati	69
W	California	77

National Championship Game
ME	Ohio State	75
W	California	55

=== National third-place game ===
National third-place game
MW	Cincinnati	95
E	NYU	71

=== Regional third-place games ===
East Regional third place
West Virginia	106
Saint Joseph's	100

Mideast Regional third place
Western Kentucky	97
Ohio	87

Midwest Regional third place
DePaul	67
Texas	61

West Regional third place
Utah	89
Santa Clara	81

== See also ==
- 1960 NCAA College Division basketball tournament
- 1960 National Invitation Tournament
- 1960 NAIA basketball tournament
