= 1959–60 Auburn Tigers men's basketball team =

American college basketball season

1959–60 Auburn Tigers men's basketball

SEC regular season champion
- Conference: Southeastern Conference

Ranking
- Coaches: No. 17
- AP: No. 11
- Record: 19–3 (12–2 SEC)
- Head coach: Joel Eaves (11th season)
- Captain: Henry Hart
- Home arena: Auburn Sports Arena

The 1959–60 Auburn Tigers men's basketball team represented Auburn University in the 1959–60 college basketball season. The team's head coach was Joel Eaves, who was in his eleventh season at Auburn. The team played their home games at Auburn Sports Arena in Auburn, Alabama. They finished the season with a record of 19–3 and 12–2 in SEC play, winning the SEC regular season championship.
