= 1959–60 West Virginia Mountaineers men's basketball team =

American college basketball season

1959–60 West Virginia Mountaineers men's basketball

Southern Conference champions

NCAA Men's Division I Tournament, Sweet Sixteen
- Conference: Southern Conference

Ranking
- Coaches: No. 6
- AP: No. 5
- Record: 26-5 ( SoCon)
- Head coach: Fred Schaus (6th season)
- Home arena: WVU Field House

1959–60 Southern Conference men's basketball standings
	Conf.				Overall
Team	W		L	PCT	W		L	PCT
Virginia Tech	12	–	1	.923	20	–	6	.769
No. 5 West Virginia †	9	–	2	.818	26	–	5	.839
William & Mary	10	–	5	.667	15	–	11	.577
The Citadel	8	–	4	.667	15	–	8	.652
George Washington	7	–	5	.583	15	–	11	.577
Furman	6	–	7	.462	9	–	16	.360
VMI	3	–	11	.214	4	–	16	.200
Richmond	2	–	12	.143	7	–	18	.280
Davidson	0	–	10	.000	5	–	19	.208
† Southern Conference Tournament winner Rankings from AP Poll

The 1959–60 West Virginia Mountaineers men's basketball team represented West Virginia University in the 1959–60 college basketball season. At the time, the Mountaineers were a member of the Southern Conference and coached by Fred Schaus in what proved to be his final year in Morgantown. After the season, he became head coach of the NBA's Los Angeles Lakers, newly relocated from Minneapolis, where he was reunited with his graduated superstar player Jerry West.

== NCAA basketball tournament ==
- East
  - West Virginia 94, Navy 86
  - NYU 82, West Virginia 81

The second game against NYU would later be infamous due to the university having at least one player (with potentially two others also being involved) from the university trying to rig the game in favor of West Virginia before later forgetting about it and trying to win the game for NYU. The player in question would later be implicated in the 1961 NCAA University Division men's basketball gambling scandal.

== Team players drafted into the NBA ==
Round	Pick	Player	NBA club
1	2	Jerry West	Minneapolis Lakers

- The Lakers participated in the draft as the Minneapolis Lakers, but moved to Los Angeles before the start of the 1960–61 season.
