= 1959–60 Cincinnati Bearcats men's basketball team =

American college basketball season

1959–60 Cincinnati Bearcats men's basketball

AP Poll regular season champions MVC champion

NCAA tournament, Third place
- Conference: Missouri Valley Conference

Ranking
- Coaches: No. 2
- AP: No. 1
- Record: 28–2 (13–1 MVC)
- Head coach: George Smith
- Home arena: Armory Fieldhouse

1959–60 Missouri Valley Conference men's basketball standings
	Conf.				Overall
Team	W		L	PCT	W		L	PCT
No. 1 Cincinnati	13	–	1	.929	28	–	2	.933
No. 4 Bradley	12	–	2	.857	27	–	2	.931
No. 15 Saint Louis	9	–	5	.643	19	–	8	.704
Wichita Municipal	6	–	8	.429	14	–	12	.538
Houston	6	–	8	.429	13	–	12	.520
Tulsa	5	–	9	.357	9	–	17	.346
Drake	4	–	10	.286	11	–	14	.440
North Texas State	1	–	13	.071	7	–	19	.269
Rankings from AP Poll

The 1959–60 Cincinnati Bearcats men's basketball team represented University of Cincinnati. The head coach was George Smith.

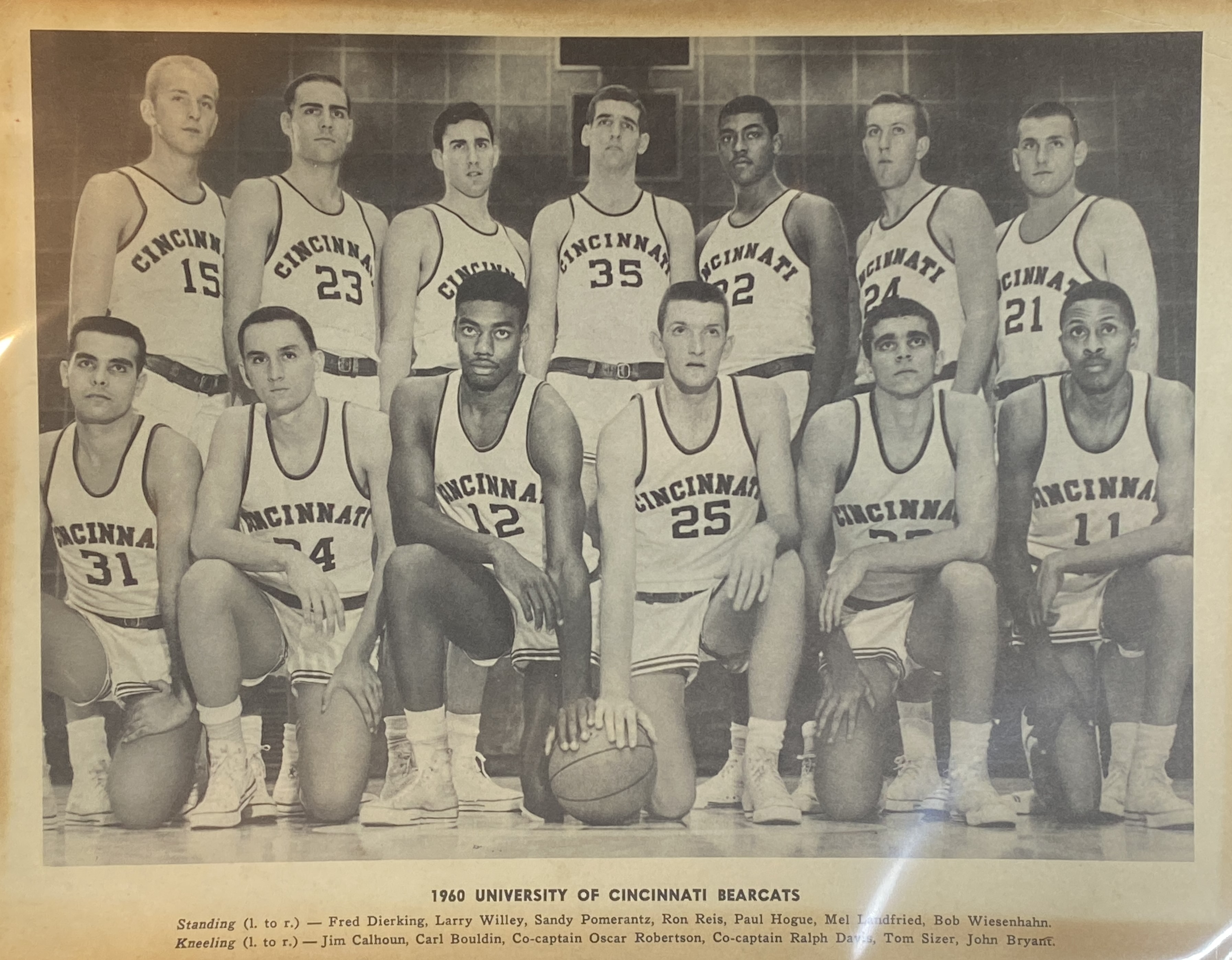
1960 Bearcats Team Photo

== Regular season ==
- In the Crosstown Shootout, Cincinnati beat Xavier by a score of 85–68. The match was held at the Cincinnati Gardens.

== NCAA basketball tournament ==
- Midwest
  - Cincinnati 99, DePaul 59
  - Cincinnati 82, Kansas 71
- Final Four
  - California 77, Cincinnati 69
- Third-place game
  - Cincinnati 95, New York 71

== Awards and honors ==
- Oscar Robertson, USBWA College Player of the Year, NCAA scoring leader (3x)

== NBA draft ==
Round	Pick	Player	NBA club
1	1	Oscar Robertson	Cincinnati Royals
3	17	Ralph Davis	Cincinnati Royals
