= 1959–60 NYU Violets men's basketball team =

American college basketball season

1959–60 NYU Violets men's basketball

Metropolitan New York Conference champions

1960 NCAA Tournament, Final Four
- Conference: Metropolitan New York Conference

Ranking
- Coaches: No. 12
- AP: No. 12
- Record: 22–5 (4–0 MNYC)
- Head coach: Lou Rossini
- Captain: Tom Sanders

1959–60 Metropolitan New York Conference men's basketball standings
	Conf.				Overall
Team	W		L	PCT	W		L	PCT
No. 12 NYU	4	–	0	1.000	22	–	5	.815
No. 20 St. John's	5	–	1	.833	17	–	8	.680
St. Francis (NY)	2	–	1	.667	13	–	8	.619
Manhattan	2	–	2	.500	13	–	11	.542
Fordham	1	–	3	.250	8	–	18	.308
CCNY	1	–	5	.167	4	–	14	.222
Brooklyn	0	–	3	.000	5	–	13	.278
Rankings from AP Poll

The 1959–60 NYU Violets men's basketball team represented New York University in intercollegiate basketball during the 1959–60 season. The team finished the season with a 22–5 overall record while winning the Metropolitan New York Conference with a perfect 4–0 record in league play. The Violets earned their second NCAA Division I basketball tournament Final Four appearance (their first was in 1944–45). They were led by second-year head coach Lou Rossini. During this season and the season after that, at least one of New York University's players in Ray Paprocky (with potentially two more players also in mind) was involved with the 1961 NCAA University Division men's basketball gambling scandal once that situation came to light a season later. However, due to the discovery not taking place until a full season later combined with the university not finishing with a top 3 finish, New York University would not rescind their Final Four appearance afterward.

== Roster ==
Name	Games played	Total points	PPG
Tom Sanders	27	577	21.2
Ray Paprocky	26	350	13.4
R. Cunningham	27	301	11.1
Al Barden	27	291	10.8
Al Filardi	27	143	5.3
Jim Reiss	26	102	3.9
Art Loche	27	99	3.7
Mike DiNapoli	19	62	3.3
Bob Bigelow	8	10	1.3
Rit Keith	10	10	1.0
Leo Murphy	17	16	0.9
Bob Regan	11	11	0.9
Bernie Mlodinoff	15	11	0.7
Bill McBain	6	5	0.8
