= Nolden Gentry =

American basketball player

Nolden Irving Gentry
Personal information
- Born: August 30, 1937 (age 89) Rockford, Illinois
- Listed height: 6 ft 7 in (2.01 m)
- Listed weight: 210 lb (95 kg)

Career information
- High school: West (Rockford, Illinois)
- College: Iowa (1957–1960)
- NBA draft: 1960: undrafted
- Position: Forward
- Number: 45

Career highlights
- All-Big Ten (1958)

Nolden Gentry (born August 30, 1937) was an American college basketball standout for Iowa in the late 1950s and early 1960s. A forward, Gentry averaged 10.3 points and 10.3 rebounds per game in his three years of varsity basketball for the Hawkeyes, earning a varsity letter each year. Graduating from Rockford West High School, Gentry led the Warriors to the IHSA state championship during consecutive seasons in 1955 and 1956.

== High school ==
Gentry was an outstanding high school basketball player at Rockford West High School, where he led the Warriors to consecutive IHSA boys' championships in 1955 and 1956, both seasons with 28–1 records. In his two years of varsity basketball, Gentry scored 863 points in 58 games, averaging 14.9 points per game and was named first team all-state as well as all-conference at forward as a junior and as a senior. During the 1954–55 season, he would average 14.6 points per game and Gentry's West Warriors would lose only to Rock Island High School during the regular season. Ironically, his team would complete the Illinois state championship by defeating fellow Big 8 Conference opponent, Elgin by a final score of 61 to 59 in a thriller that witnessed arguably the most unique play in a state championship known as the "6-Point Second" In the four game tournament, Gentry would be fourth of all scorers with 64 points, averaging 16 points per game.

As a senior, Gentry's team would have its only loss at Moline High School in their third game of the season. In his 29 games played during the season, Gentry would score 439 points, averaging 15.1 points per game and he would be named first team all-state and all-conference at the forward position. When the conference portion of the season ended, the Warriors compiled a 19–1 record. During district and sectional play, Gentry's team was only challenged one time by Galesburg High School in a double-overtime sudden-death victory, earning the team the chance to play at Huff Gymnasium in Champaign. This season the Warriors would face Edwardsville High School for the state championship. Edwardsville had future Fighting Illini teammates Govoner Vaughn and Mannie Jackson, both who would become members of the Harlem Globetrotters. During the four game tournament, Gentry would be tenth of all scorers with 50 points and be named to the all-tournament team with teammates John Wessels and Don Slaughter as well as Vaughn and Jackson.

In 1973, Gentry was inducted into the Illinois Basketball Coaches Association's Hall of Fame as a player.

== University of Iowa ==
In the fall of 1956, Gentry enrolled at the University of Iowa, playing on the freshman basketball team. In his sophomore year he was a starting forward on the 1957–58 Hawkeyes team that finished seventh in the Big Ten with a 13–9 record. As a junior, during the 1958–59 season, Gentry maintained his starting forward role on a team that finished eighth in the conference with an overall record of 10–12. Gentry's final year of basketball was the 1959–60 season, his Hawkeyes team finished their schedule with an overall record of 14 and 10, sixth place in the Big Ten. In his three years of varsity basketball, Gentry would play in 68 games, collect 703 total rebounds while scoring 703 points, averaging 10.3 points and rebounds per game.

== Professional career and after ==
After completing his undergraduate studies, Gentry was initially pursued by the Detroit Pistons and was placed in the NBA draft. Instead, he was drafted by the United States Army, but was rated 4-F and released from service due to his height. Based on this, Gentry decided to continue his education at Iowa, earning his Juris Doctor degree in 1964, with the pursuit of becoming an independent lawyer. Gentry followed law school by working for the F.B.I. as a special agent for one year in Newark, New Jersey. In 1965, an opening in the Iowa Attorney General office opened to allow Gentry to move to Des Moines to work for the Iowa Dept of Justice as a states attorney.

In 1967, Gentry became an independent lawyer in Des Moines, practicing mostly real estate and corporate law. He also became active in the community by serving on the boards of directors for several community agencies, including the Iowa Public Television Foundation, the Iowa State Board of Public Instruction, and president of the Des Moines School Board.

== College and professional stats ==
=== University of Iowa ===
Season	Games	Points	PPG	Rebounds	RPG	Big Ten Record	Overall Record	Postseason
1957–58	22	210	9.5	242	11.0	4–10	8–14	—
1958–59	22	260	11.8	253	11.5	7–7	13–09	—
1959–60	24	233	9.7	209	8.7	7–7	10–12	—
Totals	68	703	10.3	703	10.3	18–24	31–35	
