= 1959–60 Illinois Fighting Illini men's basketball team =

American college basketball season

1959–60 Illinois Fighting Illini men's basketball
- Conference: Big Ten Conference
- Record: 16–7 (8-6 Big Ten)
- Head coach: Harry Combes (13th season)
- Assistant coaches: Howie Braun (23rd season); Jim Wright (2nd season)
- MVP: Govoner Vaughn
- Captain: Mannie Jackson
- Home arena: Huff Hall

1959–60 Big Ten Conference men's basketball standings
	Conf.				Overall
Team	W		L	PCT	W		L	PCT
No. 3 Ohio State	13	–	1	.929	25	–	3	.893
No. 7 Indiana	11	–	3	.786	20	–	4	.833
Illinois	8	–	6	.571	16	–	7	.696
Minnesota	8	–	6	.571	12	–	12	.500
Northwestern	8	–	6	.571	11	–	12	.478
Iowa	6	–	8	.429	14	–	10	.583
Purdue	6	–	8	.429	11	–	12	.478
Michigan State	5	–	9	.357	10	–	11	.476
Wisconsin	4	–	10	.286	8	–	16	.333
Michigan	1	–	13	.071	4	–	20	.167
Rankings from AP Poll

The 1959–60 Illinois Fighting Illini men’s basketball team represented the University of Illinois.

== Regular season ==
Entering his 13th year as University of Illinois' head coach, Harry Combes and his Fighting Illini basketball team. Started gaining on the national scene once again by beginning the Big Ten season as a top 10 ranked team. The Associated Press would eventually rank the Illini as high as number eight during the course of the season; however, the team would falter late in the season, dropping three straight games and fall out of the rankings. The final AP and UPI rankings would include only two Big Ten teams, Ohio State (ranked 3) and Indiana (ranked 7/10). Ohio State would go on and win the NCAA Tournament. For the second time in the history of the Illini, they would play in a mid-season tournament. The tournament they would compete in would be the inaugural Los Angeles Basketball Classic held at the Los Angeles Memorial Sports Arena December 28–30.

The 1959-60 team utilized several returning lettermen including the leading scorer and team "MVP" Govoner Vaughn. It also saw the return of team "captain" Mannie Jackson as well as Ed Perry, Lou Landt, John Wessels, Lee Frandsen, Vern Altemeyer, Al Gosnell and Bruce Bunkenberg. Jerry Colangelo, a future sports mogul, also played a significant role as a sophomore. The Illini finished the season with a conference record of 8 wins and 6 losses, finishing tied for 3rd place in the Big Ten. They would finish with an overall record of 16 wins and 7 losses. The starting lineup included John Wessels at the center position, Vern Altemeyer, Lou Landt and Mannie Jackson at guard and Govoner Vaughn and Ed Perry at the forward slots.

=== Roster ===
1959–60 Illinois Fighting Illini men's basketball team
Players
Coaches

Pos.	#	Name	Height	Weight	Year	Previous school	Hometown
C	10	John Wessels	6 ft 7 in (2.01 m)	210 lb (95 kg)	Jr	Rockford West High School	Rockford, Illinois
G	12	Lee Frandsen	6 ft 3 in (1.91 m)	155 lb (70 kg)	Jr	Davenport Central High School	Davenport, Iowa
F	13	Ed Perry	6 ft 5 in (1.96 m)	195 lb (88 kg)	Sr	Salem High School	Salem, Illinois
F	14	Bruce Bunkenburg	6 ft 4 in (1.93 m)	190 lb (86 kg)	Sr	Roosevelt High School	Chicago, Illinois
F	15	Bob Schmidt	6 ft 5 in (1.96 m)	180 lb (82 kg)	Sr	Kankakee High School	Kankakee, Illinois
F	20	Jerry Renner	6 ft 1 in (1.85 m)	180 lb (82 kg)	So	East High School	Aurora, Illinois
G	21	Sam Leeper	6 ft 0 in (1.83 m)	165 lb (75 kg)	So	Unity High School	Tolono, Illinois
G	22	Jay Lovelace	6 ft 2 in (1.88 m)	165 lb (75 kg)	Fr	Carbondale Community High School	Carbondale, Illinois
G	23	Jerry Colangelo	6 ft 2 in (1.88 m)	175 lb (79 kg)	So	Bloom High School	Chicago Heights, Illinois
C	25	Bill Burwell	6 ft 8 in (2.03 m)	243 lb (110 kg)	Fr	Boys High School	Brooklyn, New York
G	30	Mannie Jackson (C)	6 ft 3 in (1.91 m)	175 lb (79 kg)	Sr	Edwardsville High School	Edwardsville, Illinois
G	31	Doug Mills	6 ft 0 in (1.83 m)	165 lb (75 kg)	So	Galesburg High School	Galesburg, Illinois
G	32	Lou Landt	6 ft 3 in (1.91 m)	180 lb (82 kg)	Sr	Roosevelt High School	Berwyn, Illinois
F	33	Al Gosnell	6 ft 3 in (1.91 m)	190 lb (86 kg)	Sr	Lawrenceville High School	Lawrenceville, Illinois
F	34	Gary McClung	6 ft 4 in (1.93 m)	185 lb (84 kg)	So	Maroa-Forsyth High School	Maroa, Illinois
F	35	Govoner Vaughn	6 ft 3 in (1.91 m)	185 lb (84 kg)	Sr	Edwardsville High School	Edwardsville, Illinois
F	40	Dave Downey	6 ft 4 in (1.93 m)	200 lb (91 kg)	So	Canton High School	Canton, Illinois
G	41	Jerry Curless	6 ft 0 in (1.83 m)	160 lb (73 kg)	So	VIT High School	Table Grove, Illinois
F	42	Ed Searcy	6 ft 5 in (1.96 m)	185 lb (84 kg)	So	Attucks High School	Indianapolis, Indiana
F	44	Bob Starnes	6 ft 4 in (1.93 m)	180 lb (82 kg)	Fr	Gage Park High School	Chicago, Illinois
G	51	Bill Mohlenbrock	6 ft 3 in (1.91 m)	178 lb (81 kg)	Jr	Murphysboro High School	Murphysboro, Illinois
C	52	Vern Altemeyer	6 ft 8 in (2.03 m)	210 lb (95 kg)	So	Scottsburg Senior High School	Scottsburg, Indiana
G	53	Bill Small	6 ft 2 in (1.88 m)	185 lb (84 kg)	Fr	West Aurora High School	Aurora, Illinois
F	55	James Knoefel	6 ft 4 in (1.93 m)	180 lb (82 kg)	So	Valparaiso High School	Valparaiso, Indiana

Head coach

- Harry Combes (University of Illinois) (13th year)

Assistant coach(es)

- Howie Braun (University of Illinois) (23rd year)
- Jim Wright (University of Illinois) (2nd year)

Legend

- (C) Team captain
- (S) Suspended
- (I) Ineligible
- (W) Walk-on
- Injured
- Current redshirt

Roster

== Schedule ==
Date time, TV	Rank^{#}	Opponent^{#}	Result	Record	Site (attendance) city, state
Non-Conference regular season
12/3/1959*		Butler	W 83–75	1-0	Huff Hall (6,417); Champaign, IL
12/12/1959*		Western Kentucky	W 93–80	2-0	Huff Hall (6,553); Champaign, IL
12/14/1959*		Marquette	W 89–77	3-0	Huff Hall (6,512); Champaign, IL
12/19/1959*		Ohio	W 85–79	4-0	Huff Hall (4,356); Champaign, IL
12/21/1959*		Oklahoma	W 60–57	5-0	Huff Hall (5,034); Champaign, IL
12/28/1959*	No. 10	vs. No. 3 California; Los Angeles Basketball Classic	L 48–62	5-1	Los Angeles Memorial Sports Arena (10,838); Los Angeles, CA
12/29/1959*	No. 8	vs. Northwestern; Los Angeles Basketball Classic / Rivalry	W 92–79	6-1	Los Angeles Memorial Sports Arena (10,295); Los Angeles, CA
12/30/1959*	No. 8	vs. Stanford; Los Angeles Basketball Classic	W 74–62	7-1	Los Angeles Memorial Sports Arena (923); Los Angeles, CA
Big Ten regular season
1/4/1960	No. 8	at No. 5 Ohio State	L 73–97	7-2 (0-1)	St. John Arena (13,263); Columbus, OH
1/9/1960	No. 9	Minnesota	W 90–82	8-2 (1-1)	Huff Hall (6,649); Champaign, IL
1/11/1960	No. 9	at Purdue	W 81–75	9-2 (2-1)	Lambert Fieldhouse (10,000); West Lafayette, IN
1/16/1960	No. 14	Michigan State	W 96–88	10-2 (3-1)	Huff Hall (6,815); Champaign, IL
1/18/1960	No. 14	at Minnesota	L 70–77	10-3 (3-2)	Williams Arena (12,729); Minneapolis, MN
1/30/1960*		vs. Notre Dame	W 71–67	11-3	Chicago Stadium (-); Chicago, IL
2/6/1960	No. 19	at Michigan	W 75-61	12-3 (4-2)	Yost Field House (2,000); Ann Arbor, MI
2/8/1960	No. 19	at Michigan State	L 77–78	12-4 (4-3)	Jenison Fieldhouse (6,325); East Lansing, MI
2/13/1960	No. 20	Purdue	W 93–89 ^{2OT}	13-4 (5-3)	Huff Hall (6,631); Champaign, IL
2/15/1960	No. 20	No. 4 Ohio State	L 81–109	13-5 (5-4)	Huff Hall (6,912); Champaign, IL
2/20/1960	No. 20	at Wisconsin	L 63–75	13-6 (5-5)	Wisconsin Field House (7,885); Madison, WI
2/22/1960	No. 20	Indiana; Rivalry	L 78–92	13-7 (5-6)	Huff Hall (6,864); Champaign, IL
2/27/1960	No. 20	Iowa; Rivalry	W 85–70	14-7 (6-6)	Huff Hall (6,691); Champaign, IL
2/29/1960		at Michigan	W 90–61	15-7 (7-6)	Yost Field House (5,277); Ann Arbor, MI
3/5/1960		at Northwestern; Rivalry	W 84–77	16-7 (8-6)	McGaw Memorial Hall (5,800); Evanston, IL
*Non-conference game. ^{#}Rankings from AP Poll. (#) Tournament seedings in parentheses. All times are in Central Time.

== Player stats ==
Player	Games played	Field goals	Free throws	Rebounds	Points
Govoner Vaughn	23	164	83	189	411
Mannie Jackson	23	162	54	94	378
Ed Perry	23	74	64	141	212
Lou Landt	23	70	36	64	176
John Wessels	14	56	43	98	155
Lee Frandsen	20	41	32	37	114
Vern Altemeyer	23	44	25	94	113
Al Gosnell	23	36	24	95	96
Bruce Bunkenburg	18	22	20	42	64
Jerry Colangelo	19	25	10	16	60
Ed Searcy	17	20	6	57	46
Bob Starnes	2	0	2	1	2
Bob Schmidt	1	1	0	1	2
Doug Mills	4	1	0	1	2
Tom Adams	1	0	0	0	0
Jerry Curless	1	0	0	0	0
Bill Mohlenbrock	1	0	0	0	0

== Awards and honors ==
- Govoner Vaughn
  - Converse Honorable Mention All-American
  - Team Most Valuable Player
- Mannie Jackson
  - Converse Honorable Mention All-American

== Team players drafted into the NBA ==
Player	NBA club	Round	Pick
No Players Selected			
