= John Wessels (basketball) =

College basketball player (b. 1938, d. 1994)

- John Wessels

Personal information
- Born: February 13, 1938 Rockford, Illinois
- Died: December 3, 1994 (aged 56) Rockford, Illinois
- Listed height: 6 ft 7 in (2.01 m)
- Listed weight: 210 lb (95 kg)

Career information
- High school: West (Rockford, Illinois)
- College: Illinois (1958–1961)
- NBA draft: 1961: 8th round, 76th overall pick
- Drafted by: Chicago Packers
- Playing career: 1961–1963
- Position: Center
- Number: 10

Career history
- 1961–1962: Chicago Majors
- 1962–1963: Pittsburgh Rens

Career highlights
- Honorable mention All-American – Converse (1961); Honorable mention All-Big Ten (1959)
- Stats at Basketball Reference

John M. Wessels (February 13, 1938 – December 3, 1994) was an American college basketball standout for Illinois in the late 1950s and early 1960s. A center, Wessels averaged 13.4 points and 8.7 rebounds per game in his three years of varsity basketball for the Fighting Illini, earning a varsity letter each year. Graduating from Rockford West High School, Wessels led the Warriors to the IHSA state championship during consecutive seasons in 1955 and 1956.

== High school ==
Wessels was an outstanding high school basketball player at Rockford West High School, where he led the Warriors to consecutive IHSA boys' championships in 1955 and 1956, both seasons with 28–1 records. In his two years of varsity basketball, Wessels scored 1,178 points in 55 of 58 games, averaging 21.4 points per game and named second team all-conference at center. During the 1954–55 season, Wessels' West Warriors would lose only to Rock Island High School during the regular season. Ironically, his team would complete the championship by defeating fellow Big 8 Conference opponent, Elgin by a final score of 61 to 59 in a thriller that witnessed arguably the most unique play in a state championship known as the "6-Point Second" In the four game tournament, Wessels would score 51 points, averaging 12.8 points per game.

As a senior, Wessels would begin the year on the bench due to an indiscretion that suspended him from school. Based on the suspension, Wessels missed the first three games of the year, including the team's only loss at Moline High School. In his 26 games played during the season, Wessels would lead the team in scoring at 648 points, averaging 24.9 points per game and he would be named second team all-state and all-conference at the center position. When the conference portion of the season ended, the Warriors compiled a 19–1 record. During district and sectional play, Wessels' team was only challenged one time by Galesburg High School in a double-overtime sudden-death victory, earning the team the chance to play at Huff Gymnasium in Champaign. This season the Warriors would face Edwardsville High School for the state championship. Edwardsville had future Fighting Illini teammates Govoner Vaughn and Mannie Jackson, both who would become members of the Harlem Globetrotters. During the four game tournament, Wessels would lead all scorers with 107 points and be named to the all-tournament team with teammates Nolden Gentry and Don Slaughter as well as Vaughn and Jackson.

In 1974, Wessels was inducted into the Illinois Basketball Coaches Association's Hall of Fame as a player.

In 2007, the Illinois High School Association named Wessels one of the 100 Legends of the IHSA Boys Basketball Tournament.

== University of Illinois ==
In the fall of 1956, Wessels initially enrolled at North Carolina State and was a member of the freshman basketball team. After only one season, Wessels transferred to the University of Illinois in the fall of 1957, playing on the freshman basketball team. In his sophomore year he was the starting center of the 1958–59 Fighting Illini team that finished fifth in the Big Ten with a 12–10 record. As a junior, during the 1959–60 season, Wessels maintained his starting center role on a team that finished third in the conference with an overall record of 16–7. The pinnacle of his career was the 1960–61 season, Wessels earned the distinction of being an honorable mention All-American on an Illini team that finished their schedule with an overall record of 9 and 15, seventh place in the Big Ten. In his three years of varsity basketball, Wessels would play in 60 games, collect 521 total rebounds while scoring 803 points, averaging 13.4 points per game. After the conclusion of the season, he would be drafted in the 8th round of the 1961 NBA draft by the Chicago Packers.

== Professional career and after ==
After completing his undergraduate studies, Wessels played briefly in the American Basketball League for the Chicago Majors and Pittsburgh Rens. During his time with Chicago, Wessels played in 64 games, pulled down 319 rebounds, had 45 assists and scored 639 points. Based on the fact that the ABL ceased operations in January 1963, Wessels playing career came to an abrupt end.

Wessels became the sales manager of Kinetico Water Systems in his hometown of Rockford. In December 1994, at the age of 56, Wessels died of cancer.

== Honors ==
=== Basketball ===
- Honorable Mention All-Big Ten (1959)
- Honorable Mention All-American (1961)
- Inducted into the Illinois Basketball Coaches Association's Hall of Fame as a player (1974)
- Named one of the 100 Legends of the IHSA Boys Basketball Tournament (2007)

== College and professional stats ==
=== University of Illinois ===
Season	Games	Points	PPG	Field Goals	Attempts	Avg	Free Throws	Attempts	Avg	Rebounds	Avg	Big Ten Record	Overall Record
1958–59	22	327	14.9	126	304	.414	75	115	.652	205	9.3	7–7	12–10
1959–60	14	155	11.1	56	135	.415	43	62	.694	99	7.1	8–6	16–7
1960–61	24	321	13.4	119	282	.422	83	116	.716	217	9.0	5–9	9–15
Totals	60	803	13.4	301	721	.417	201	293	.686	521	8.7	20–22	37–32

=== Chicago Majors ===
Season	Games	Points	PPG	Rebounds	RPG	Overall Record	Place	Postseason
1961–62	64	639	9.3	319	5.0	39–44	3rd	—
