= Iose Epenesa =

American football player (born 2007)

No. 97 – Iowa Hawkeyes
- Position: Defensive end
- Class: Freshman

Personal information
- Born: February 5, 2007 (age 19)
- Listed height: 6 ft 3 in (1.91 m)
- Listed weight: 260 lb (118 kg)

Career information
- High school: Edwardsville (Edwardsville, Illinois)
- College: Iowa (2025–present)

Awards and highlights
- Polynesian High School Football Player of the Year (2024)
- Stats at ESPN

Iose Epenesa (YO-say) (born February 5, 2007) is an American football defensive end for the Iowa Hawkeyes.

== Early life ==
Epenesa grew up in Edwardsville, Illinois and attended Edwardsville High School, where he played football, basketball, and was on the track and field team. He holds the school record in shot-put and is second in the discus throw, behind his brother A.J. Epenesa. As a junior Epenesa, he had 46 tackles, seven sacks, ten tackles for loss, and three forced fumbles as a junior. He was selected to play in the 2025 All-American Bowl.

Epenesa was rated a five-star recruit by 247Sports. He committed to play college football at Iowa over offers from Penn State, Miami, and Utah.

== College career ==
Epenesa enrolled at Iowa on June 1, 2025.

== Personal life ==
Epenesa's older brother, A. J., played defensive end at Iowa and currently plays in the NFL for the Philadelphia Eagles. Another brother, Eric, is a linebacker at Iowa. Epenesa's father also played defensive line at Iowa.
