= Craig James (defensive back) =

American football player (born 1996)

Profile
- Position: Defensive back

Personal information
- Born: April 29, 1996 (age 30); Springfield, Illinois, U.S.
- Listed height: 5 ft 10 in (1.78 m)
- Listed weight: 195 lb (88 kg)

Career information
- High school: Edwardsville (Edwardsville, Illinois)
- College: Minnesota, Southern Illinois
- NFL draft: 2018: undrafted

Career history
- Minnesota Vikings (2018); Philadelphia Eagles (2019–2021); New York Jets (2022–2023); Detroit Lions (2023)*; Toronto Argonauts (2025)*; Ottawa Redblacks (2025)*
- * Offseason or practice squad member only

Career NFL statistics as of 2024
- Total tackles: 18
- Pass deflections: 2
- Fumble recoveries: 1
- Stats at Pro Football Reference

Craig James (born April 29, 1996) is an American professional football defensive back. He was most recently a member of the Ottawa Redblacks of the Canadian Football League (CFL). He played college football at Southern Illinois.

== Early life ==
James was born and grew up in Edwardsville, Illinois and attended Edwardsville High School, where he played football and ran track. WNBA player Kate Martin's dad, Matt Martin, was Craig James's and Buffalo Bills defensive end A. J. Epenesa's football and track coach as well as Riley Patterson's football coach during their student years at Edwardsville High School.

== College career ==
James played his first two seasons at the University of Minnesota, serving as a reserve corner and the team's primary punt returner until breaking his leg during his sophomore season. James transferred to Southern Illinois for his final two seasons. As a junior, James recorded 30 tackles and led the Salukis with three interceptions and nine passes broken up and was named to the Missouri Valley Football Conference All-Newcomer team.

== Professional career ==
Pre-draft measurables
| Height | Weight | Arm length | Hand span | 40-yard dash | 10-yard split | 20-yard split |
|---|---|---|---|---|---|---|
| 5 ft 10 in (1.78 m) | 193 lb (88 kg) | 30 1/4 in (0.77 m) | 8 5/8 in (0.22 m) | 4.50 s | 1.59 s | 2.63 s |
All values from Pro Day

=== Minnesota Vikings ===
James was signed by the Minnesota Vikings as an undrafted free agent on April 30, 2018. He was cut by the Vikings at the end of the preseason. James was re-signed to the Vikings' practice squad on October 16. James was promoted to the Vikings' active roster on November 27. James made his NFL debut on December 2, against the New England Patriots. James played three games during his rookie season, appearing exclusively on special teams.

James was waived during final roster cuts on August 31, 2019.

=== Philadelphia Eagles ===
James was signed to the Philadelphia Eagles practice squad on September 2, 2019. He was promoted to the team's active roster on September 11, 2019. He was waived on September 17, and re-signed to the team's practice squad the next day. He was promoted to the active roster again on September 24 after an injury to Ronald Darby. In the following game against the Green Bay Packers and in the third defensive snap of his career, James deflected a pass at the Eagles three-yard line that was then intercepted by linebacker Nigel Bradham with 28 seconds left to preserve a 34-27 Eagles win. James made his first career start the next week on October 6, 2019, against the New York Jets, making three tackles.

On September 4, 2020, James signed a one-year contract extension with the Eagles through the 2021 season. He was placed on injured reserve on September 15. James was designated to return from injured reserve on October 7, and began practicing with the team again. He was activated on October 10. James was placed back on injured reserve on November 16 with a shoulder injury.

On August 31, 2021, James was waived by the Eagles and re-signed to the practice squad the next day. He was placed on the COVID-19 list on January 1, 2022, and activated three days later, missing just one game. He signed a reserve/future contract with the Eagles on January 18. James was released July 18.

=== New York Jets ===
On July 21, 2022, James signed with the New York Jets, but was released five days later. He was signed to the practice squad on September 1. James signed a reserve/future contract on January 9, 2023.

On August 29, 2023, James was released by the Jets and re-signed to the practice squad. He was released on September 26. He was re-signed on October 3, and released again on November 15. He was re-signed on November 21 and released again on November 28.

=== Detroit Lions ===
On December 21, 2023, James was signed to the Detroit Lions practice squad. He signed a reserve/future contract on January 30, 2024. On June 13, James was released by the Lions.

=== Toronto Argonauts ===
On January 7, 2025, James signed with the Toronto Argonauts of the Canadian Football League.

=== Ottawa Redblacks ===
On February 10, 2025, James was traded to the Ottawa Redblacks. He was part of the final training camp cuts on May 31, 2025.
