= 1959–60 UCLA Bruins men's basketball team =

American college basketball season

1959–60 UCLA Bruins men's basketball
- Conference: Athletic Association of Western Universities
- Record: 14–12 (7–5 AAWU)
- Head coach: John R. Wooden (12th season)
- Assistant coaches: Bill Putnam; Jerry Norman
- Home arena: Los Angeles Memorial Sports Arena

1959–60 AAWU Conference men's basketball standings
	Conf.				Overall
Team	W		L	PCT	W		L	PCT
No. 2 California	11	–	1	.917	28	–	2	.933
UCLA	7	–	5	.583	14	–	12	.538
USC	5	–	7	.417	16	–	11	.593
Stanford	4	–	7	.364	11	–	14	.440
Washington	2	–	9	.182	15	–	13	.536
Rankings from AP Poll

The 1959–60 UCLA Bruins men's basketball team represented the University of California, Los Angeles during the 1959–60 NCAA University Division men's basketball season and were members of the Athletic Association of Western Universities. The Bruins were led by 12th year head coach John Wooden. They finished the regular season with a record of 14–12 and finished second in the AAWU with a record of 7–5. After five years at the Pan-Pacific Auditorium, UCLA moved to the new Los Angeles Memorial Sports Arena.

== Previous season ==
The Bruins finished the regular season with a record of 16–9 and finished third in the PCC with a record of 10–6.

== Roster ==
1959–60 UCLA Bruins men's basketball team
Players
Coaches

Pos.	#	Name	Height	Weight	Year	Hometown
G	25	Stanley Andersen	6 ft 2 in (1.88 m)	—	So
G	30	Duane Barnes	5 ft 11 in (1.8 m)	—	Jr
C	35	John Berberich	6 ft 8 in (2.03 m)	—	Jr
G	22	Bob Berry	5 ft 10 in (1.78 m)	—	Jr
F	52	Pete Blackman	6 ft 5 in (1.96 m)	—	So
G	23	Cliff Brandon (C)	5 ft 10 in (1.78 m)	—	Sr
F	55	Gary Cunningham	6 ft 5 in (1.96 m)	—	So
G	42	Bill Ellis	6 ft 3 in (1.91 m)	—	Jr
G	45	John Green	6 ft 3 in (1.91 m)	—	So
G	24	Bill Hicks	6 ft 3 in (1.91 m)	—	So
C	33	Warnell Jones	6 ft 9 in (2.06 m)	—	Jr
G	44	Billy Kilmer	6 ft 0 in (1.83 m)	—	Jr
F	54	Brian Kniff	6 ft 4 in (1.93 m)	—	Jr
F	32	Kent Miller	6 ft 6 in (1.98 m)	—	Jr
F	20	Sonny Skjervheim	6 ft 2 in (1.88 m)	—	Jr

Head coach

John Wooden (Purdue)

Assistant coach(es)

- Bill Putnam (UCLA)
- Jerry Norman (UCLA)

Legend

- (C) Team captain
- (S) Suspended
- (I) Ineligible
- (W) Walk-on
- Injured
- Current redshirt

Roster
Last update: 30 January 2018

== Schedule ==
Date time, TV	Rank^{#}	Opponent^{#}	Result	Record	Site city, state
Regular Season
December 1, 1959		USC	W 47–45	1–0	Los Angeles Memorial Sports Arena (6,880); Los Angeles, CA
December 4, 1959*		Kentucky	L 66–68	1–1	Los Angeles Memorial Sports Arena (7,145); Los Angeles, CA
December 5, 1959*		Santa Clara	W 75–73	2–1	Los Angeles Memorial Sports Arena (8,163); Los Angeles, CA
December 11, 1959*		BYU	W 62–42	3–1	Los Angeles Memorial Sports Arena (5,433); Los Angeles, CA
December 12, 1959*		Oklahoma State	L 48–52	3–2	Los Angeles Memorial Sports Arena (5,054); Los Angeles, CA
December 18, 1959*		at Purdue	L 74–75	3–3	Lambert Fieldhouse; West Lafayette, IN
December 19, 1959*		at Butler	L 74–75	3–4	Hinkle Fieldhouse; Indianapolis, IN
December 21, 1959*		at Minnesota	W 73–72	4–4	Williams Arena; Minneapolis, MN
December 28, 1959*		Michigan; Los Angeles Classic	W 93–68	5–4	Los Angeles Memorial Sports Arena; Los Angeles, CA
December 29, 1959*		No. 2 West Virginia; Los Angeles Classic	L 73–87	5–5	Los Angeles Memorial Sports Arena; Los Angeles, CA
December 30, 1959		USC; Los Angeles Classic	L 62–72	5–6	Los Angeles Memorial Sports Arena; Los Angeles, CA
January 2, 1960		Washington	W 57–55	6–6 (1–0)	Los Angeles Memorial Sports Arena; Los Angeles, CA
January 4, 1960		Washington	W 55–54	7–6 (2–0)	Los Angeles Memorial Sports Arena; Los Angeles, CA
January 8, 1960		at No. 2 California	L 47–59	7–7 (2–1)	Men's Gym; Berkeley, CA
January 15, 1960		No. 10 USC	W 63–62	8–7 (3–1)	Los Angeles Memorial Sports Arena; Los Angeles, CA
January 19, 1960*		at Denver	L 68–71	8–8	DU Fieldhouse; Denver, CO
January 30, 1960		at Air Force	W 76–75	9–8	Cadet Gymnasium; Colorado Springs, CO
February 5, 1960*		New Mexico	W 66–56	10–8	Los Angeles Memorial Sports Arena; Los Angeles, CA
February 6, 1960		Stanford	W 67–54	11–8 (4–1)	Los Angeles Memorial Sports Arena; Los Angeles, CA
February 12, 1960		at Stanford	W 58–52	12–8 (5–1)	Stanford Pavilion; Stanford, CA
February 13, 1960		at No. 3 California	L 45–53	12–9 (5–2)	Men's Gym; Berkeley, CA
February 19, 1960		Stanford	W 49–48	13–9 (6–2)	Los Angeles Memorial Sports Arena; Los Angeles, CA
February 20, 1960		No. 3 California	L 57–67	13–10 (6–3)	Los Angeles Memorial Sports Arena; Los Angeles, CA
February 27, 1960		at Washington	L 73–84	13–11 (6–4)	Hec Edmundson Pavilion; Seattle, WA
March 4, 1960		USC	L 71–91	13–12 (6–5)	Los Angeles Memorial Sports Arena; Los Angeles, CA
March 5, 1960		USC	W 72–70	14–12 (7–5)	Los Angeles Memorial Sports Arena; Los Angeles, CA
*Non-conference game. ^{#}Rankings from AP Poll. (#) Tournament seedings in parentheses. All times are in Pacific Time.
