= 1959–60 Ohio State Buckeyes men's basketball team =

American college basketball season

1959–60 Ohio State Buckeyes men's basketball
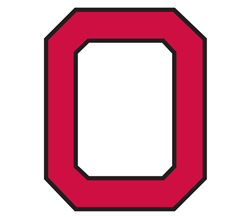

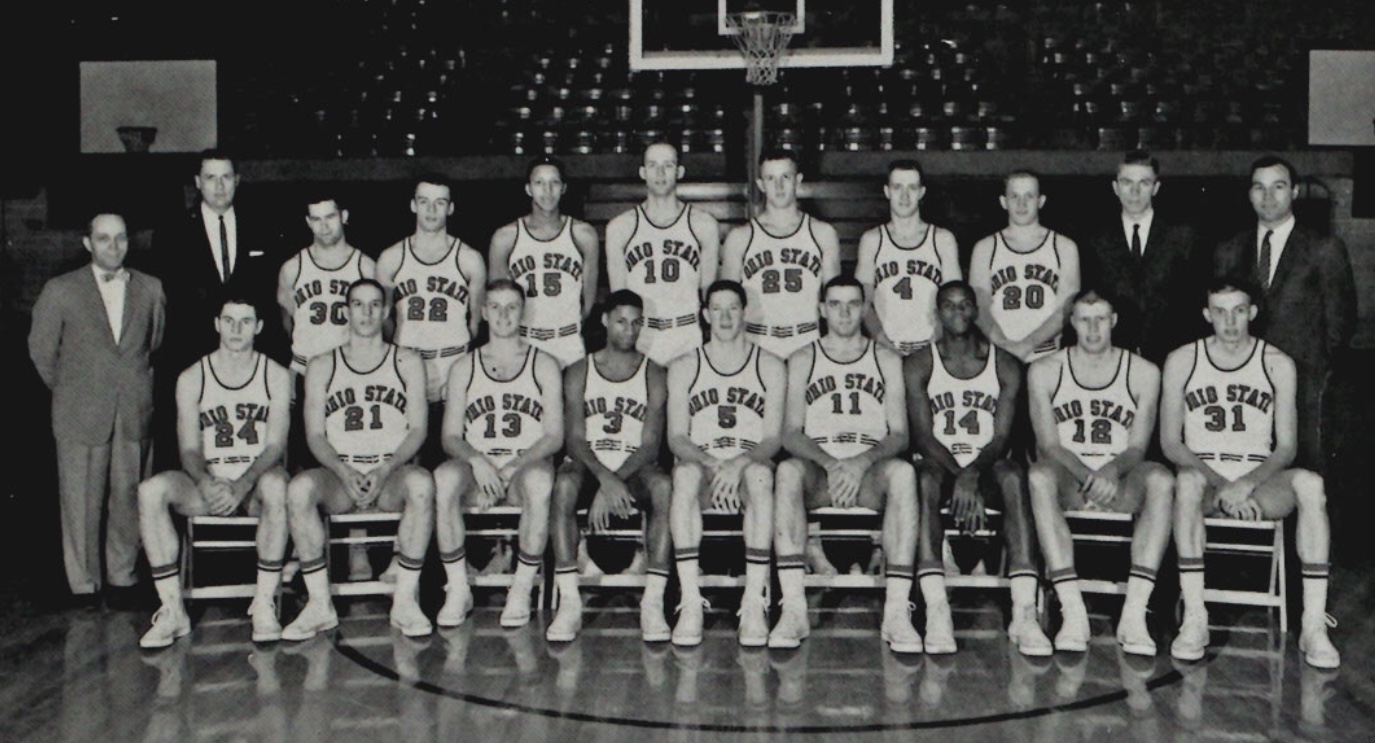

NCAA tournament National champions Big Ten regular season champions

National Championship Game, W 75–55 vs. California
- Conference: Big Ten Conference

Ranking
- Coaches: No. 3
- AP: No. 3
- Record: 25–3 (13–1 Big Ten)
- Head coach: Fred Taylor
- Assistant coaches: Jack Graf; Frank Truitt
- Home arena: St. John Arena

1959–60 Big Ten Conference men's basketball standings
	Conf.				Overall
Team	W		L	PCT	W		L	PCT
No. 3 Ohio State	13	–	1	.929	25	–	3	.893
No. 7 Indiana	11	–	3	.786	20	–	4	.833
Illinois	8	–	6	.571	16	–	7	.696
Minnesota	8	–	6	.571	12	–	12	.500
Northwestern	8	–	6	.571	11	–	12	.478
Iowa	6	–	8	.429	14	–	10	.583
Purdue	6	–	8	.429	11	–	12	.478
Michigan State	5	–	9	.357	10	–	11	.476
Wisconsin	4	–	10	.286	8	–	16	.333
Michigan	1	–	13	.071	4	–	20	.167
Rankings from AP Poll

The 1959–60 Ohio State Buckeyes men's basketball team is the only basketball team to win a national title in Ohio State history. They were coached by Hall of Fame coach Fred Taylor and had three future Hall of Famers on their roster—center Jerry Lucas, forward John Havlicek, and reserve forward Bob Knight, who entered the Hall for his storied coaching career, most notably at Indiana.

== Roster ==
1959–60 Ohio State Buckeyes men's basketball team
Players
Coaches

Pos.	#	Name	Height	Weight	Year	Previous school	Hometown
G	3	Mel Nowell	6 ft 2 in (1.88 m)	165 lb (75 kg)	So	East	Columbus, Ohio
G	5	John Havlicek	6 ft 5 in (1.96 m)	195 lb (88 kg)	So	Bridgeport	Bridgeport, Ohio
F/C	11	Jerry Lucas	6 ft 8 in (2.03 m)	220 lb (100 kg)	So	Middletown	Middletown, Ohio
	12	Dick Furry	—	—	Sr	West	Columbus, Ohio
F	14	Joe Roberts	6 ft 6 in (1.98 m)	210 lb (95 kg)	Sr	East	Columbus, Ohio
G	21	Larry Siegfried	6 ft 3 in (1.91 m)	185 lb (84 kg)	Jr	Shelby	Shelby, Ohio
F	24	Bob Knight	6 ft 5 in (1.96 m)	—	So	Orrville	Orrville, Ohio

Head coach

- Fred Taylor (Ohio State)

Assistant coach(es)

Legend

- (C) Team captain
- (S) Suspended
- (I) Ineligible
- (W) Walk-on
- Injured
- Current redshirt

== Season summary ==
Coach Fred Taylor started two sophomores at the beginning of the season, Lucas and Mel Nowell, with returnees Joe Roberts, Larry Siegfried and Dick Furry. An injury to Furry got Havlicek inserted into that first game, and he started thereafter.

In this era, freshman could not play varsity college basketball. The recruiting class of Lucas, Nowell, Havlicek, Knight, and Gary Gearhart were not eligible to lead the Buckeyes until 1959–60. This was their first college season of play as the game is considered today.

The 1959–60 team posted the best shooting, highest-scoring team in college basketball that season at over 90 points per game. The key to the attack was the rebounding and outlet passing of Lucas. The other four athletes routinely overwhelmed opponents with fast break baskets. In 1960, this kind of offensive play was then the cutting edge of the game, and a big reason why all five starters were later drafted into the NBA. There were only eight NBA teams at this time, so this was not an easy feat.

Lucas shot a then-record 63% from the floor that season in an era when some college starters commonly shot 35% from the floor. More than just a consistent rebounder, he also had an above average shooting eye for the time from as far out as 25 feet. While the statistic was not well-kept then, Lucas likely led this team in assists, at 5–6 per game by being a consistent passer. He came very close to leading the country in both individual scoring and rebounding as well as shooting. The Bucks also had a notable backcourt at the time in Siegfried and Nowell. Siegfried was then rated very highly as an all-around guard at both ends of the court. With Havlicek, he looked to contribute to the team's offense with his hustling defense, Siegfried became active this season in this area as well. Nowell had one-on-one playground skills that were well-developed and effective immediately that season. With three sophomores now starting, Ohio State did have two early-season losses to Utah and Kentucky, but then clicked through the rest of the schedule. A late-season loss to Indiana came after they had clinched the Big Ten.

The Buckeyes steamrolled through the NCAA tournament by an average of 19.5 points a game, dusting off defending national champion California 75–55 in the final behind two future NBA stars, Jerry Lucas and John Havlicek, two excellent guards in Larry Siegfried and Mel Nowell and a defensive work ethic that limited opponents to .388 shooting over the course of the season. The team was also very well-coached. After Hall-of-Famer Taylor, Graf had coached at Harvard and was very strong on defense. Truitt later led as a college coach at several NCAA schools.

== NCAA basketball tournament ==
- Mideast
  - Ohio State 98, Western Kentucky 79
  - Ohio State 86, Georgia Tech 69
- Final Four
  - Ohio State 76, NYU 54
  - Ohio State 75, California 55

== NCAA Basketball Championship ==
In that game, the Buckeyes shooting was off the charts, but it was also defense that won them the championship. Lucas gave Darrall Imhoff room only when he was far away from the basket; in close, he was always between Imhoff and the ball. Still, very few in the noisy capacity audience at the Cow Palace in Daly City, California -most of them California partisans- were ready to concede defeat to the Big Ten champions. Often enough in the past, California had come from behind to win on the wings of its mistake-inducing press. Pete Newell brought his team back into play in the second half, with a crushing defense and within five minutes, Cal scored 10 points to Ohio State's 5. Ironically, though, it was this fanatical defense that eventually proved to be Cal's undoing. Covering on the Ohio State man with the ball, the Golden Bears were obliged to uncover a free man somewhere else. After a short period of fumbling, Ohio State began to find him. Two or three furiously quick breaks with more than five minutes to go destroyed California for good. When the flurry was over, Ohio State's shooting percentage was a remarkable 67.4 percent, and its victory margin was the largest in the 22-year history of the NCAA finals.

== Rankings ==
Ranking movements Legend: ██ Increase in ranking ██ Decrease in ranking
	Week													
Poll	1	2	3	4	5	6	7	8	9	10	11	12	13	Final
AP	Not released		3	5	7	5	5	5	4	4	4	2	2	3
Coaches	4	2	3	4	5	4	5	5	4	4	3	3	3	3

== Awards and honors ==
- Jerry Lucas, NCAA Men's MOP Award
- Jerry Lucas, All-America selection
- Jerry Lucas, Chicago Tribune Silver Basketball
- Jerry Lucas, First-Team All Big Ten

== Team players drafted in the NBA ==
Round	Pick	Player	NBA club
3	21	Joe Roberts	Syracuse Nationals
