= John Tidwell (basketball) =

American basketball player

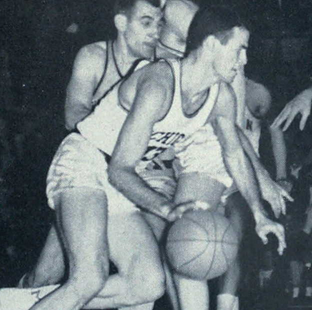
- Tidwell in 1960

Personal information
- Listed height: 6 ft 4 in (1.93 m)
- Listed weight: 180 lb (82 kg)

Career information
- High school: Herrin (Herrin, Illinois)
- College: Michigan (1958–1961)
- NBA draft: 1961: 4th round, 38th overall pick
- Drafted by: Philadelphia Warriors
- Position: Guard

Career highlights
- Second-team Parade All-American (1957)
- Stats at Basketball Reference

John W. Tidwell is an American former basketball player. He played for the University of Michigan from 1958 to 1961 and broke the school's records for points scored (43) in a single game and single season. He later became an obstetrician-gynecologist in Charlotte, North Carolina.

== Biography ==
=== Early years ===
Tidwell grew up in Herrin in southern Illinois. He played basketball for Herrin High School from 1955 to 1957, leading the school to a 28–3 record as a junior and 31–2 as a senior. In 1957, the 6 feet, 4 inch Tidwell was the tallest player and the high scorer for the Herrin High School team that won the Illinois state basketball championship. Herrin defeated Elgin in the quarter-finals, Quincy Notre Dame in the semi-finals, and Collinsville in the championship game. The 1957 state championship was considered a great feat because Herrin was a relatively small city, and Illinois had only one class in basketball. Tidwell was also selected as a first-team forward on the 1957 Illinois All-State basketball team.

=== Michigan ===
Tidwell was one of the most highly rated high school basketball players in the Midwest in 1957. He reportedly received scholarships from 70 colleges, including the University of Illinois and University of Michigan. Michigan's head coach Bill Perigo did not travel to Herrin to recruit Tidwell, but Tidwell chose Michigan because of its good engineering school.

He played college basketball for the University of Michigan from 1958–1961. Tidwell managed to excel in basketball game despite what the Chicago Daily Tribune described as "the handicap of a short and twisted left arm." Tidwell sustained the injury while playing quarterback for the freshman football team while in high school in 1953. He dislocated his left elbow when his arm was pinned behind his back on being tackled. He had a pin placed in his elbow. Tidwell later recalled how the injury had affected his jump shot:

"I never could get full range of motion back. ... When taking a right-handed jump shot, it was unorthodox. It was an unusual shot, because I couldn't straighten my left arm. I ended up shooting it from lesser height, bending my right arm more to compensate for my left arm. The right elbow was out. It was a different shot. But I shot it effectively."

As a sophomore, Tidwell made a name for himself in his first varsity basketball game for Michigan. Tidwell was matched up against University of Pittsburgh All-American Don Hennon and scored 22 points in his debut. He followed with 24 points in his second collegiate game against the University of Tennessee and another 24 points the following week against Butler. He also led the Wolverines with 22 points in a 93–68 win over the University of Detroit in the Motor City Classic. His play helped lead Michigan to a 6–1 start in 1958, and he was credited with having "created an upsurge of interest in basketball at Michigan." After his first seven games, sports writer Jerry Green called Tidwell "the most exciting cager to arrive at Michigan in years." Green noted that Tidwell "floats quietly around the court, shooting sure-handedly, making deft passes, piling up points." In December 1958, the Chicago Daily Tribune reported, "One of the big ones from Illinois got away last year -- and turned up on the Ann Arbor campus of the University of Michigan." Michigan's coach Perigo noted, "He's so smooth and steady out there you don't notice him until he comes out."

As a junior during the 1959–1960 academic year, Tidwell broke the Michigan record for single game scoring record on February 27, 1960, as he hit 17 of 25 field goals and seven of ten free throws for 41 points in a 72–65 win against Michigan State. Tidwell's 41 points also broke the Yost Field House record which had been set by Indiana's Don Schlundt with 29 points in 1953. Tidwell also broke the season scoring record as a junior with 520 points—an average of 21.6 points per game. At the end of the 1959–1960 basketball season, Tidwell was selected as the team's most valuable player and elected captain of the 1960–1961 team.

As the senior captain of the 1960–1961 Michigan basketball team, Tidwell suffered a mid-season slump in February 1961, but still finished the season with 441 points and an average 19.2 points per game. On March 4, 1961, he broke his own single game scoring record with 43 points against the University of Minnesota. Two days later, on March 6, 1961, Tidwell scored 24 points against Illinois in his final home game for Michigan. When he left the game, he was given a three-minute standing ovation by the spectators at Yost Field House. At the end of the season, he was selected by his teammates as the team's most valuable player for the second consecutive year.

During his three years playing for the Wolverines, Tidwell scored 1,386 points. At the conclusion of his Michigan basketball career, head coach Dave Strack called Tidwell "one of the finest collegiate basketball players in the nation."

Tidwell was drafted by the Philadelphia Warriors in the fourth round (38th overall pick) of the 1961 NBA draft, but he chose instead to attend medical school.

=== Medical career ===
After graduating from the University of Michigan Medical School in 1965, Tidwell spent a year as an intern at the University of Maryland Hospital and four years as a resident at the University of Michigan. After two years in the U.S. Army, he moved to Charlotte, North Carolina where he began practicing as on obstetrician-gynecologist. Tidwell is the founder and managing partner of the Mintview Charlotte Women's Specialists medical group in Charlotte.

Tidwell was inducted into the University of Michigan Athletic Hall of Honor in 1996.

== See also ==
- University of Michigan Athletic Hall of Honor
