= 1960 NCAA University Division basketball championship game =

1960 NCAA Tournament Championship Game
National championship game
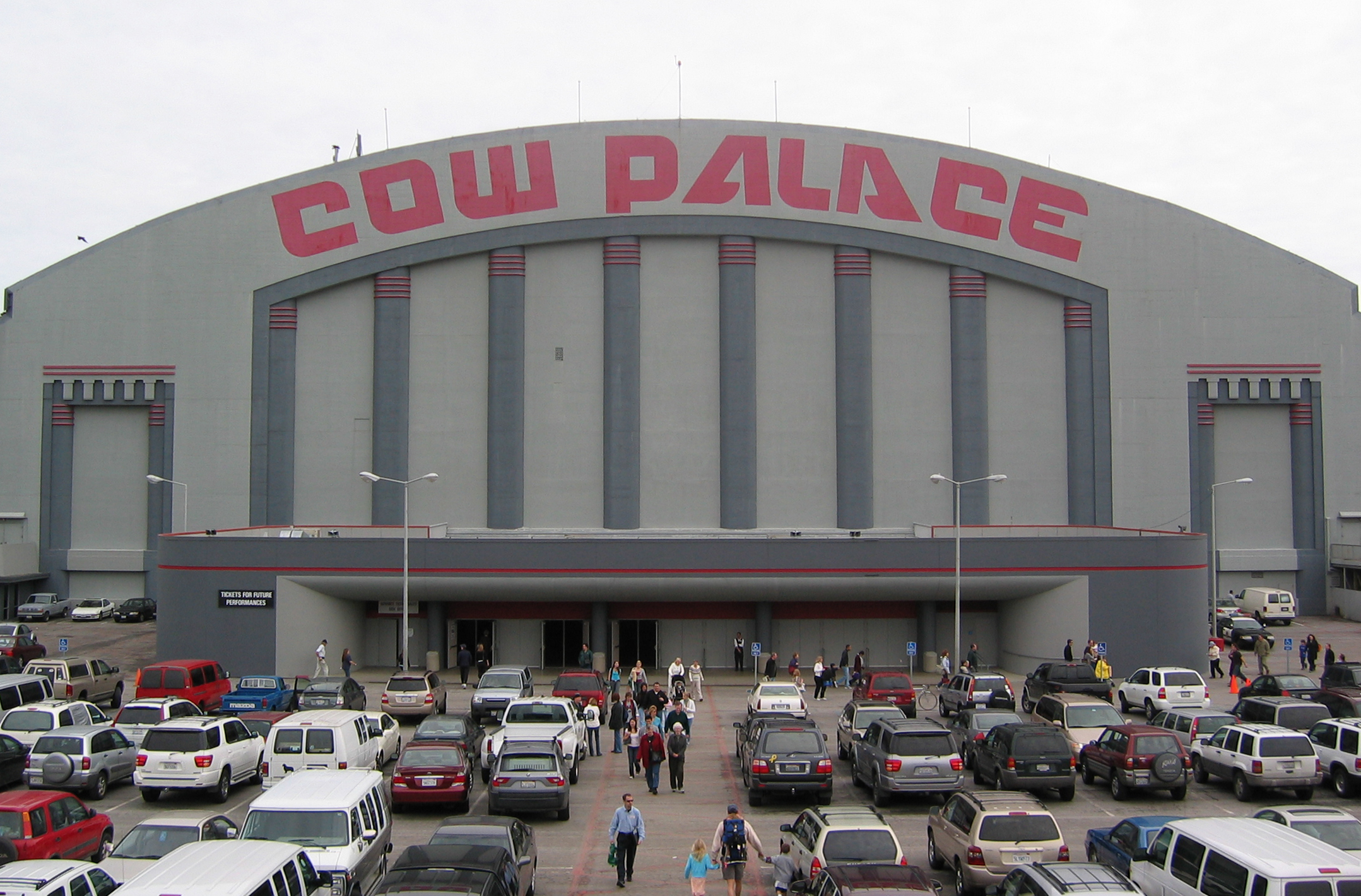
- Cow Palace in Daly City, California, hosted the championship game.
Ohio State Buckeyes	California Golden Bears
Big Ten	AAWU
(24-3)	(28-1)
75	55
Head coach: Fred Taylor	Head coach: Pete Newell
- AP: 3
- Coaches: 3
- AP: 2
- Coaches: 1
	1st half	2nd half	Total
Ohio State Buckeyes	37	38	75
California Golden Bears	19	36	55
- Date: March 19, 1960
- Venue: Cow Palace, Daly City, California
- MVP: Jerry Lucas, Ohio State

The 1960 NCAA University Division Basketball Championship Game was the finals of the 1960 NCAA University Division basketball tournament and it determined the national champion for the 1959-60 NCAA University Division men's basketball season. The game was played on March 19, 1960, at the Cow Palace in Daly City, California. It featured the Ohio State Buckeyes of the Big Ten Conference, and the defending national champion California Golden Bears of the Athletic Association of Western Universities.

Ohio State defeated the defending national champions by 20 points, clinching their first basketball national championship in program history.

== Participating teams ==
=== Ohio State Buckeyes ===
- Mideast
  - Ohio State 98, Western Kentucky 79
  - Ohio State 86, Georgia Tech 69
- Final Four
  - Ohio State 76, NYU 54

=== California Golden Bears ===
- West
  - California 71, Idaho State 44
  - California 69, Santa Clara 49
  - California 70, Oregon 49
- Final Four
  - California 77, Cincinnati 69

== Game summary ==
March 19, 1960

#3 Ohio State Buckeyes 75, #2 California Golden Bears 55
Scoring by half: 37-19, 38-36
Pts: Jerry Lucas 16; Rebs: Jerry Lucas 10	Pts: Dick Doughty 11; Rebs: Dick Doughty 6

Cow Palace, Daly City, California

== Aftermath ==
After the loss to the Buckeyes in the title game, the Golden Bears entered a slump in which they would not return to the NCAA tournament until 1990. This remains the last title game appearance for California.

1960 marked a high point for Ohio State in basketball, as while the team would make the Final Four and the championship in the years since, they would fail to win another title. The Buckeyes would return to the national championship game the next year and in 1962 as the number-one ranked team in the nation both times, but they would be upended by in-state foe Cincinnati in both games. The Buckeyes also returned to the national championship in 2007, also as the number-one ranked team in the nation, but they would lose to Florida, bringing their record in the championship game to 1–4.
