= 1959–60 Michigan Wolverines men's basketball team =

American college basketball season

1959–60 Michigan Wolverines men's basketball
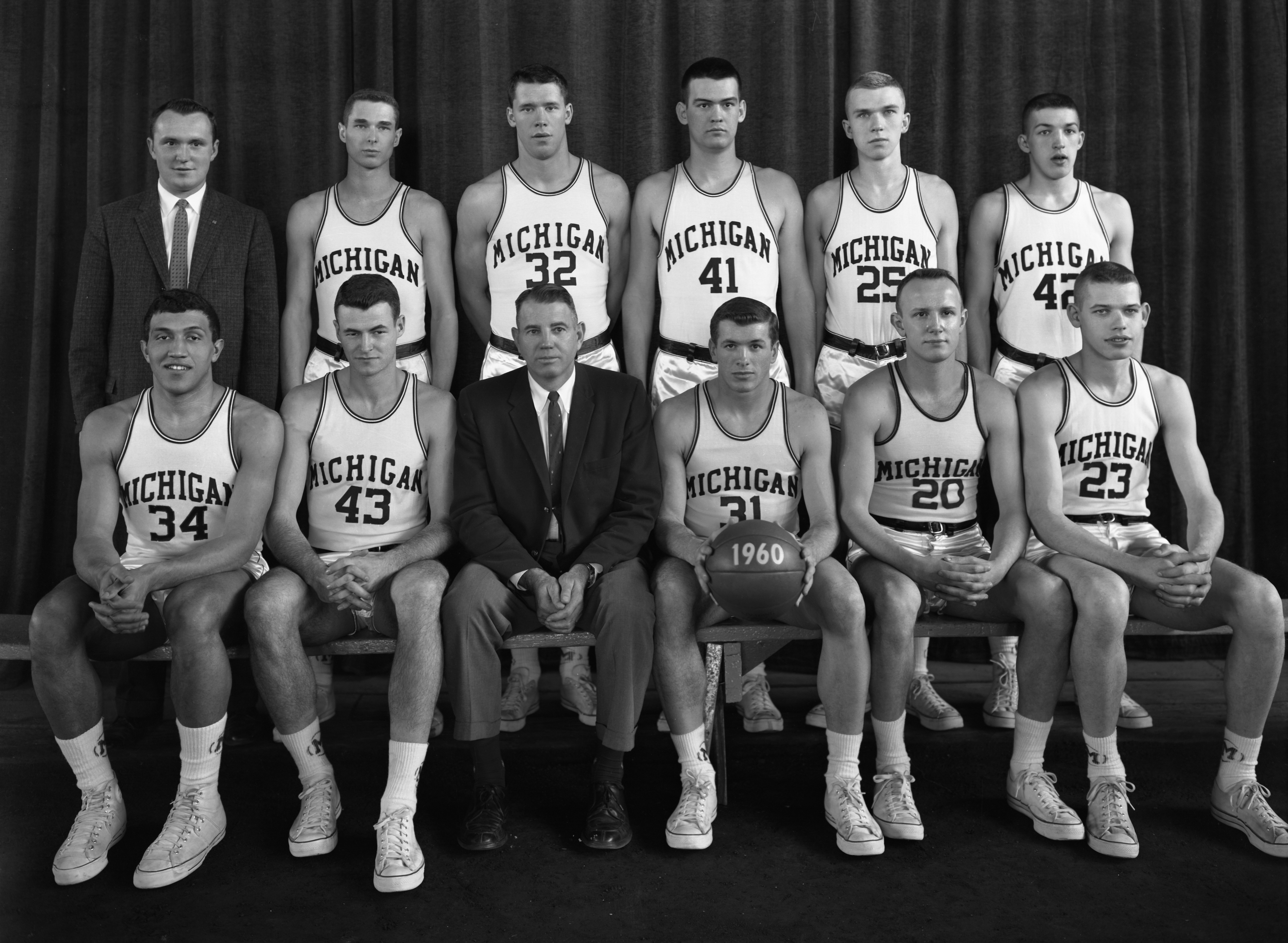
- Conference: Big Ten Conference
- Record: 4–20 (1–10 Big Ten)
- Head coach: William Perigo
- MVP: John Tidwell
- Captain: Terry Miller
- Home arena: Yost Field House

1959–60 Big Ten Conference men's basketball standings
	Conf.				Overall
Team	W		L	PCT	W		L	PCT
No. 3 Ohio State	13	–	1	.929	25	–	3	.893
No. 7 Indiana	11	–	3	.786	20	–	4	.833
Illinois	8	–	6	.571	16	–	7	.696
Minnesota	8	–	6	.571	12	–	12	.500
Northwestern	8	–	6	.571	11	–	12	.478
Iowa	6	–	8	.429	14	–	10	.583
Purdue	6	–	8	.429	11	–	12	.478
Michigan State	5	–	9	.357	10	–	11	.476
Wisconsin	4	–	10	.286	8	–	16	.333
Michigan	1	–	13	.071	4	–	20	.167
Rankings from AP Poll

The 1959–60 Michigan Wolverines men's basketball team represented the University of Michigan in intercollegiate basketball during the 1959–60 season. The team finished the season in tenth place in the Big Ten Conference with an overall record of 4–20 and 1–10 against conference opponents.

William Perigo was in his eighth and final year as the team's head coach. Junior John Tidwell was the team's leading scorer with 520 points in 24 games for an average of 21.6 points per game. Tidwell broke the Michigan record for single game scoring record on February 27, 1960, as he hit 17 of 25 field goals and seven of ten free throws for 41 points in a 72–65 win against Michigan State. Tidwell's 41 points also broke the Yost Fieldhouse record which had been set by Indiana's Don Schlundt with 29 points in 1953. Tidwell also broke the season scoring record with 520 points. At the end of the 1959–60 basketball season, Tidwell was selected as the team's most valuable player and elected captain of the 1960–61 team.

Lovell Farris led the team with 233 rebounds.

== Statistics ==
Player	Pos.	Yr	G	GS	FG	FT	RB	Pts	PPG
John Tidwell	F-G	Jr.	24	24	201-482	118-159	147	520	21.6
Terry Miller	G	Sr.	22	22	135-391	61-77	83	331	15.0
Lovell Farris	C-F	Sr.	24	24	112-320	97-144	233	321	13.3
Scott Maentz	F	So.	12	11	41-134	12-23	144	94	7.8
Dick Clark	G	So.	11	8	24-58	12-25	57	60	5.5
Jon Hall	G	So.	8	8	24-100	6-21	49	54	6.7
Dick Meyer	C	Jr.	11	2	10-29	19-31	31	39	3.5
Bob Brown	C	So.	10	10	15-53	4-17	92	34	3.4
Charlie Higgs	F	So.	10	1	10-36	8-14	32	28	2.8
Rich Donley	F	Jr.	18	3	6-42	13-28	70	25	1.3
Rich Robins	G	Jr.	3	1	6-21	3-4	9	15	5.0
Paul Sangster	F	So.	5	1	6-13	2-3	7	14	2.8
Steve Schoenherr	G	So.	19	5	6-35	0-1	15	12	0.6
Dick Lyons	G	So.	6	0	1-12	0-0	6	2	0.3
Dave Zimmerman	F	So.	6	0	0-13	2-3	9	2	0.3
Robert Brown	F	Jr.	1	0	0-0	0-0	0	0	0.0
Totals			24		597-1739	357-550	1069	1551	64.6

== Team players drafted into the NBA ==
One player from this team were selected in the NBA draft.

Year	Round	Pick	Overall	Player	NBA Club
1961	4	6	38	John Tidwell	Philadelphia Warriors
