= John Green (basketball) =

American basketball player (born 1940)

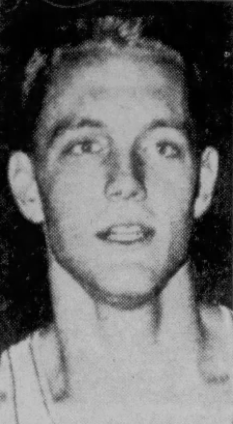
- Green with UCLA c. 1962

Personal information
- Born: July 30, 1940 (age 86) Rochester, Minnesota, U.S.
- Listed height: 6 ft 3 in (1.91 m)
- Listed weight: 195 lb (88 kg)

Career information
- College: UCLA (1959–1962)
- NBA draft: 1962: 3rd round, 26th overall pick
- Drafted by: Los Angeles Lakers
- Position: Guard

Career highlights
- Honorable mention All-American – UPI (1962); First-team All-AAWU (1962); Second-team All-AAWU (1960, 1961)
- Stats at Basketball Reference

John Bernard Green (born July 30, 1940) is an American former college basketball player for the UCLA Bruins. He received honorable mention as an All-American in his senior year in 1962, when he led the Bruins in scoring, and they advanced to their first Final Four. Green was thrice voted all-conference in the Athletic Association of Western Universities (AAWU), including a first-team selection. He was selected by the Los Angeles Lakers of the National Basketball Association (NBA) in the third round of the 1962 NBA draft.

== Early life ==
Green was born in Rochester, Minnesota. He grew up in Houston (MN), where his father, Bernard, ran a drugstore, before moving to South St. Paul. Green attended South St. Paul High School, where he played basketball as a sophomore. In 1956, his family moved to San Fernando, California. As a senior at San Fernando High School in 1958, the center-forward led the Valley League in scoring with 184 points and an 18.4 per game average, despite being double teamed by most opponents. He was named the league's player of the year. Green also played baseball and led the league with a .400 batting average. He then went to Pierce College and earned player of the year honors in the Western State Conference as a freshman after averaging close to 25 points per game.

== Basketball career ==
Green transferred to the University of California, Los Angeles, where he was a three-year starter at guard for the Bruins. Extroverted and lively, he was nicknamed "the Mouth" by his teammates. Green earned second-team All-AAWU honors in each of his first two seasons. He led the team in scoring as a sophomore in 1959–60 with 265 points in 26 games for an average of 10.2 points per game, and ranked fourth in 1960–61 with 324 points (12.5 per game). In his senior year in 1961–62, UCLA began the season slowly, losing seven of their first 11 games. The team grew adept at handling sophomore guard Walt Hazzard's incredible passes, which they initially thought were impossible and were not expecting. He became a catalyst for their fast breaks. The Bruins went 12–2 to become AAWU champions. They clinched the title against Washington after coming back from 12 points down with 12 minutes remaining, winning the game on a driving layup by Green.

Unranked all season, UCLA entered the 1962 NCAA tournament with the worst record at 16–9. They reached the Final Four for the first time in the school's history, and the first of 12 for their coach, John Wooden. The Bruins lost 72–70 to No. 2–ranked and eventual champion Cincinnati, after the Bearcats' Tom Thacker made a deep 25-foot (7.6 m) shot with three seconds remaining. Green finished the game with a team-high 27 points, including 19 in the second half and two free throws to tie the contest with 1:34 remaining. He was chosen for the all-tournament second team. UCLA's leading scorer for the season at 19.3 points per game, he developed into one of the country's top shooters. He played at top speed, convinced that Hazzard would get him the ball if he got open. Green was voted an honorable mention All-American by United Press International. The Helms Foundation named him a first-team All-American, while Converse placed him on their second team. (Note: UPI was used to compile the consensus All-American team that season. Helms (1929–1948) and Converse (1932–1948) had also been used in the past.) He was a unanimous selection for the All-AAWU first team. Green's season total of 559 points ranked second in UCLA history, behind Willie Naulls' 661 points in 1955–56. Green's 262 free throw attempts were almost twice as many as the next teammate. (Note: Hazzard was second with 143.) He left the Bruins ranked No. 4 in school history with 1,148 career points. (Note: Ahead of him were Naulls (1,225), John Moore (1,202) and Walt Torrence (1,181).) He was inducted into the UCLA Athletics Hall of Fame in 2001.

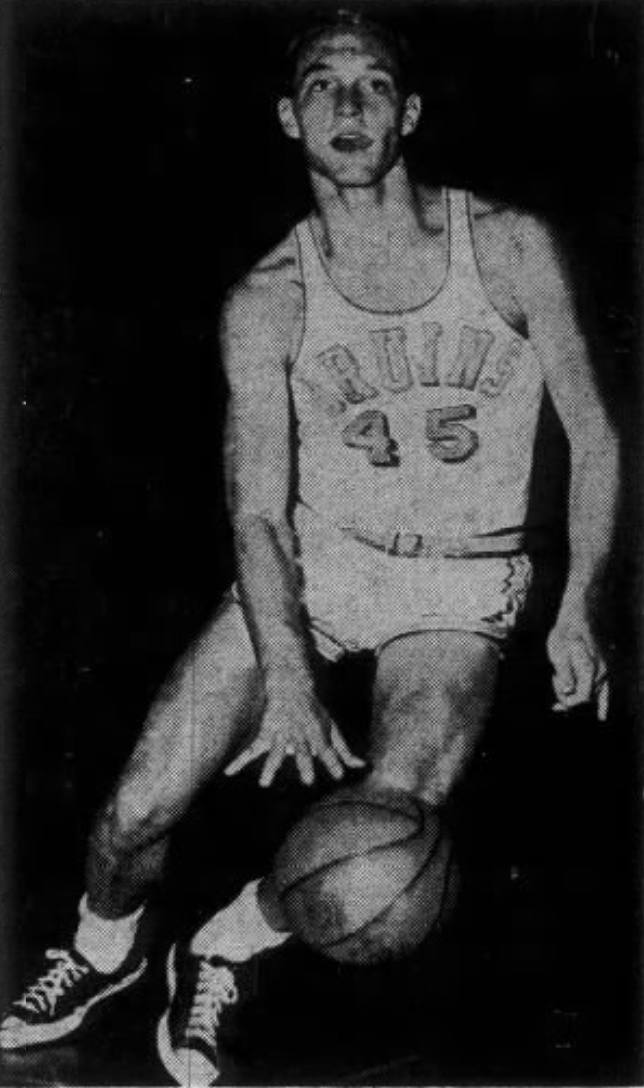
Green was the leading scorer on UCLA's first Final Four team.

Green was selected by the Los Angeles Lakers in the third round of the 1962 NBA draft with the 26th overall pick. He was impressive at their rookie camp in June, when Lakers coach Fred Schaus said that "Green's good collegiate background is evident here" and he "can probably make the squad". However, they released him in September after acquiring veteran guard Dick Barnett. Schaus was satisfied with his backcourt of Barnett and Hot Rod Hundley as backups to starters Jerry West and Frank Selvy. Later that year, Green played in the San Fernando Valley Municipal Sports Association's preseason basketball tournament, and won the championship with Goddard's. In 1963, he played in the Valley College summer league with Powers Realty. In the championship game, Green scored a game-high 24 points in an 81–63 win over Entre Nous.

== Later years ==
Green worked in banking and real estate appraising before retiring and moving back to Houston in 2003.
