= 1959–60 California Golden Bears men's basketball team =

American college basketball season

1959–60 California Golden Bears men's basketball

Athletic Association of Western Universities Champions Coaches Poll regular season champions NCAA tournament, runner-up

National Championship Game, L 55-75 vs. Ohio State
- Conference: Athletic Association of Western Universities

Ranking
- Coaches: No. 1
- AP: No. 2
- Record: 28–2 (11–1 AAWU)
- Head coach: Pete Newell (6th season)
- Assistant coach: Rene Herrerias (4th season)
- Home arena: Harmon Gym

1959–60 AAWU Conference men's basketball standings
	Conf.				Overall
Team	W		L	PCT	W		L	PCT
No. 2 California	11	–	1	.917	28	–	2	.933
UCLA	7	–	5	.583	14	–	12	.538
USC	5	–	7	.417	16	–	11	.593
Stanford	4	–	7	.364	11	–	14	.440
Washington	2	–	9	.182	15	–	13	.536
Rankings from AP Poll

The 1959–60 California Golden Bears men's basketball team represented the University of California, Berkeley in NCAA University Division basketball competition. Led by sixth-year head coach Pete Newell, serving in his final season at the school, the Golden Bears made their second consecutive, and most recent, Final Four. Cal finished as runner-up in the 1960 NCAA Tournament, losing to Ohio State in the championship game.

== Roster ==
1959–60 California Golden Bears men's basketball team
Players
Coaches

Pos.	#	Name	Height	Weight	Year	Hometown
		Dick Doughty	6 ft 8 in (2.03 m)	—	Sr	Oakland, California
F		Tandy Gillis	6 ft 6 in (1.98 m)	—	Sr	Long Beach, California
C	40	Darrall Imhoff	6 ft 10 in (2.08 m)	—	Sr	Alhambra, California
		Jerry Mann	6 ft 2 in (1.88 m)	—	Sr	San Francisco, California
F	42	Bill McClintock	6 ft 4 in (1.93 m)	—	Jr	Milwaukee, Wisconsin
G		Earl Shultz	6 ft 4 in (1.93 m)	—	Jr	South Gate, California
F		Dave Stafford	6 ft 3 in (1.91 m)	—	Jr
G		Bobby Wendell	5 ft 8 in (1.73 m)	—	Jr

Head coach

Pete Newell (Loyola Marymount)

Assistant coach(es)

- Rene Herrerias (San Francisco)

Legend

- (C) Team captain
- (S) Suspended
- (I) Ineligible
- (W) Walk-on
- Injured
- Current redshirt

Roster
Last update: December 29, 2021

== Schedule and results ==
Date time, TV	Rank^{#}	Opponent^{#}	Result	Record	Site (attendance) city, state
Regular season
Dec 4, 1959*		at UC Santa Barbara	W 59–47	1–0	Robertson Gymnasium; Santa Barbara, California
Dec 8, 1959*		at San Francisco	W 65–40	2–0	War Memorial Gymnasium; San Francisco, California
Dec 12, 1959*		San Jose State	W 54–43	3–0	Harmon Gym; Berkeley, California
Dec 18, 1959*		Colorado	W 51–47	4–0	Harmon Gym; Berkeley, California
Dec 19, 1959*		Colorado	W 79–46	5–0	Harmon Gym; Berkeley, California
Dec 23, 1959*	No. 4	No. 11 Michigan State	W 71–60	6–0	Harmon Gym; Berkeley, California
Dec 28, 1959*	No. 3	No. 8 Illinois; Los Angeles Basketball Classic	W 62–48	7–0	Los Angeles Memorial Sports Arena (10,838); Los Angeles, California
Dec 29, 1959*	No. 3	at USC; Los Angeles Basketball Classic	W 65–61 ^{OT}	8–0	Los Angeles Memorial Sports Arena; Los Angeles, California
Dec 30, 1959*	No. 3	vs. No. 2 West Virginia; Los Angeles Basketball Classic	W 65–45	9–0	Los Angeles Memorial Sports Arena; Los Angeles, California
Jan 2, 1960	No. 3	at USC	L 57–65	9–1 (0–1)	Los Angeles Memorial Sports Arena; Los Angeles, California
Jan 4, 1960	No. 3	at No. 10 USC	W 60–45	10–1 (1–1)	Los Angeles Memorial Sports Arena; Los Angeles, California
Jan 8, 1960	No. 2	UCLA	W 59–47	11–1 (2–1)	Harmon Gym; Berkeley, California
Jan 9, 1960	No. 2	at Stanford	W 52–43	12–1 (3–1)	Old Pavilion; Stanford, California
Jan 15, 1960*	No. 2	Washington State	W 54–43	13–1	Harmon Gym; Berkeley, California
Jan 16, 1960	No. 2	Washington	W 79–39	14–1 (4–1)	Harmon Gym; Berkeley, California
Jan 29, 1960*	No. 3	Oregon	W 70–45	15–1	Harmon Gym; Berkeley, California
Jan 30, 1960*	No. 3	Oregon State	W 67–48	16–1	Harmon Gym; Berkeley, California
Feb 5, 1960	No. 3	Washington	W 68–53	17–1 (5–1)	Harmon Gym; Berkeley, California
Feb 12, 1960*	No. 3	USC	W 57–46	18–1 (6–1)	Harmon Gym; Berkeley, California
Feb 13, 1960	No. 3	UCLA	W 53–45	19–1 (7–1)	Harmon Gym; Berkeley, California
Feb 20, 1960	No. 3	at UCLA	W 67–57	20–1 (8–1)	Los Angeles Memorial Sports Arena; Los Angeles, California
Feb 26, 1960	No. 4	at Washington	W 54–47	21–1 (9–1)	Hec Edmundson Pavilion; Seattle, Washington
Feb 27, 1960*	No. 4	at Oregon State	W 62–47	22–1	Oregon State Coliseum; Corvallis, Oregon
Mar 4, 1960	No. 3	Stanford	W 51–42	23–1 (10–1)	Harmon Gym; Berkeley, California
Mar 5, 1960	No. 3	at Stanford	W 70–51	24–1 (11–1)	Old Pavilion; Stanford, California
NCAA Tournament
Mar 8, 1960*	No. 2	vs. Idaho State	W 71–44	25–1	War Memorial Gymnasium; San Francisco, California
Mar 11, 1960*	No. 2	vs. Santa Clara; Regional semifinal – Sweet Sixten	W 69–49	26–1	Hec Edmundson Pavilion; Seattle, Washington
Mar 12, 1960*	No. 2	vs. Oregon; Regional final – Elite Eight	W 70–49	27–1	Hec Edmundson Pavilion; Seattle, Washington
Mar 18, 1960*	No. 2	vs. No. 1 Cincinnati; National semifinal – Final Four	W 77–69	28–1	Cow Palace; Daly City, California
Mar 19, 1960*	No. 2	vs. No. 3 Ohio State; National Championship Game	L 55–75	28–2	Cow Palace; Daly City, California
*Non-conference game. ^{#}Rankings from AP Poll. (#) Tournament seedings in parentheses. All times are in Pacific Time.

== Rankings ==
Ranking movements Legend: ██ Increase in ranking ██ Decrease in ranking
	Week													
Poll	1	2	3	4	5	6	7	8	9	10	11	12	13	Final
AP	Not released		4	3	2	2	3	3	3	3	3	4	3	2
Coaches	2	4	4	3	2	2	2	2	1	1	1	1	1	1

== Awards and honors ==
- Darrall Imhoff – Consensus First-team All-American
- Pete Newell – Henry Iba Award, NABC Coach of the Year, UPI College Basketball Coach of the Year

== 1960 NBA draft ==
Round	Pick	Player	NBA team
1	3	Darrall Imhoff	New York Knicks
