= 1959–60 Washington Huskies men's basketball team =

American college basketball season

1959–60 Washington Huskies men's basketball
- Conference: Athletic Association of Western Universities
- Record: 15–13 (2–9 AAWU, Big Five)
- Head coach: John Grayson (1st season)
- Assistant coach: Joe Cipriano
- Home arena: Hec Edmundson Pavilion

1959–60 AAWU Conference men's basketball standings
	Conf.				Overall
Team	W		L	PCT	W		L	PCT
No. 2 California	11	–	1	.917	28	–	2	.933
UCLA	7	–	5	.583	14	–	12	.538
USC	5	–	7	.417	16	–	11	.593
Stanford	4	–	7	.364	11	–	14	.440
Washington	2	–	9	.182	15	–	13	.536
Rankings from AP Poll

The 1959–60 Washington Huskies men's basketball team represented the University of Washington for the 1959–60 NCAA University Division basketball season. Led by first-year head coach John Grayson, the Huskies were members of the Athletic Association of Western Universities (Big Five) and played their home games on campus at Hec Edmundson Pavilion in Seattle, Washington.

The Huskies were 15–13 overall in the regular season and 2–9 in conference play, last in the standings.

Grayson was hired in July 1959, following the departure of Tippy Dye in June to become athletic director at Wichita State. Grayson was the head coach at Idaho State, formerly of the Rocky Mountain Conference, and had led the Bengals to the NCAA tournament in 1957 with a 25–2 regular season record; he coached the Husky program for four years.

Following the season in May 1960, assistant (and alumnus) Joe Cipriano became the head coach at independent Idaho. After a successful 20–6 season on the Palouse with the Vandals in 1963, he rejoined Dye at Nebraska of the Big Eight Conference, and guided the Huskers for seventeen years.
