= 1959–60 Indiana Hoosiers men's basketball team =

American college basketball season

1959–60 Indiana Hoosiers men's basketball
- Conference: Big Ten Conference

Ranking
- Coaches: No. 10
- AP: No. 7
- Record: 20–4 (11–3 Big Ten)
- Head coach: Branch McCracken (19th season)
- Assistant coaches: Lou Watson; Gene Ring
- Captain: Frank Radovich
- Home arena: The Fieldhouse

1959–60 Big Ten Conference men's basketball standings
	Conf.				Overall
Team	W		L	PCT	W		L	PCT
No. 3 Ohio State	13	–	1	.929	25	–	3	.893
No. 7 Indiana	11	–	3	.786	20	–	4	.833
Illinois	8	–	6	.571	16	–	7	.696
Minnesota	8	–	6	.571	12	–	12	.500
Northwestern	8	–	6	.571	11	–	12	.478
Iowa	6	–	8	.429	14	–	10	.583
Purdue	6	–	8	.429	11	–	12	.478
Michigan State	5	–	9	.357	10	–	11	.476
Wisconsin	4	–	10	.286	8	–	16	.333
Michigan	1	–	13	.071	4	–	20	.167
Rankings from AP Poll

The 1959–60 Indiana Hoosiers men's basketball team represented Indiana University. Their head coach was Branch McCracken, who was in his 19th year. For the last time, the team played its home games in The Fieldhouse in Bloomington, Indiana, and was a member of the Big Ten Conference.

The Hoosiers finished the regular season with an overall record of 20–4 and a conference record of 11–3, finishing 2nd in the Big Ten Conference. Indiana was not invited to participate in any postseason tournament.

== Roster ==
No.	Name	Position	Ht.	Year	Hometown
13	Bob Reinhart	G	5–10	Sr.	Dale, Indiana
15	Gary Long	G	6–1	Jr.	Shelbyville, Indiana
20	Al Schlegelmilch	G	6–1	Sr.	Monticello, Indiana
21	Leroy Johnson	F	6–4	Jr.	Mishawaka, Indiana
23	Jerry Bass	G	5–9	So.	Morristown, Indiana
24	Herbie Lee	G	5–11	Jr.	South Bend, Indiana
25	Glen Butte	F	6–4	Sr.	Milan, Indiana
30	Gordon Mickey	F	6–7	So.	Chillicothe, Ohio
31	Norbert Witte	C	6–7	Sr.	Decatur, Indiana
32	Ernie Wilhoit	G	6–3	So.	Collinsville, Illinois
33	Frank Radovich	F	6–7	Sr.	Hammond, Indiana
35	Walt Bellamy	C	6–11	Jr.	New Bern, North Carolina
41	Bill Altman	F	6–2	So.	Mooresville, Indiana
42	Charley Hall	F	6–6	So.	Terre Haute, Indiana
44	Bob Wilkinson	G	6–1	Sr.	LaPorte, Indiana

== Schedule/results ==
Date time, TV	Rank^{#}	Opponent^{#}	Result	Record	Site city, state
Regular season
12/5/1959*		Ball State	W 103–63	1–0	The Fieldhouse; Bloomington, IN
12/7/1959*		at Missouri	L 76–79	1–1	Brewer Fieldhouse; Columbia, MO
12/12/1959*		Ohio	W 80–68	2–1	The Fieldhouse; Bloomington, IN
12/14/1959*		Kansas State	W 67–58	3–1	The Fieldhouse; Bloomington, IN
12/19/1959*		Detroit	W 89–85	4–1	The Fieldhouse; Bloomington, IN
12/22/1959*	No. 9	at Butler; Hoosier Classic	W 91–85	5–1	Butler Fieldhouse; Indianapolis, IN
12/23/1959*	No. 9	vs. Notre Dame; Hoosier Classic	W 71–60	6–1	Butler Fieldhouse; Indianapolis, IN
12/28/1959*	No. 9	vs. Maryland; Bluegrass Festival Tournament	W 72–63	7–1	Freedom Hall; Louisville, KY
12/29/1959*	No. 7	at Louisville; Bluegrass Festival Tournament	W 90–71	8–1	Freedom Hall; Louisville, KY
1/2/1960	No. 7	Purdue; Rivalry	L 76–79	8–2 (0–1)	The Fieldhouse; Bloomington, IN
1/4/1960	No. 7	at Northwestern	L 57–61	8–3 (0–2)	Welsh-Ryan Arena; Evanston, IL
1/9/1960	No. 11	at Ohio State	L 95–96	8–4 (0–3)	St. John Arena; Columbus, OH
1/11/1960	No. 11	at Michigan	W 77–72	9–4 (1–3)	Yost Field House; Ann Arbor, MI
1/30/1960*		at DePaul	W 82–78	10–4 (1–3)	Alumni Hall; Chicago, IL
2/1/1960		Northwestern	W 76–58	11–4 (2–3)	The Fieldhouse; Bloomington, IN
2/6/1960		at Wisconsin	W 97–85	12–4 (3–3)	Wisconsin Field House; Madison, WI
2/8/1960		Iowa	W 87–74	13–4 (4–3)	The Fieldhouse; Bloomington, IN
2/13/1960		Wisconsin	W 91–71	14–4 (5–3)	The Fieldhouse; Bloomington, IN
2/15/1960		Michigan	W 86–69	15–4 (6–3)	The Fieldhouse; Bloomington, IN
2/20/1960		at Iowa	W 79–64	16–4 (7–3)	Iowa Field House; Iowa City, IA
2/22/1960		at Illinois; Rivalry	W 92–78	17–4 (8–3)	Huff Hall; Champaign, IL
2/27/1960	No. 20	Minnesota	W 78–74	18–4 (9–3)	New Fieldhouse; Bloomington, IN
2/29/1960	No. 20	Ohio State	W 99–83	19–4 (10–3)	The Fieldhouse; Bloomington, IN
3/5/1960	No. 12	at Michigan State	W 86–80	20–4 (11–3)	Jenison Fieldhouse; East Lansing, MI
*Non-conference game. ^{#}Rankings from AP Poll. (#) Tournament seedings in parentheses.
