= 1959–60 Wisconsin Badgers men's basketball team =

American college basketball season

1959–60 Wisconsin Badgers men's basketball
- Conference: Big Ten Conference
- Record: 8–16 (4–10 Big Ten)
- Head coach: John Erickson
- Home arena: UW Fieldhouse

1959–60 Big Ten Conference men's basketball standings
	Conf.				Overall
Team	W		L	PCT	W		L	PCT
No. 3 Ohio State	13	–	1	.929	25	–	3	.893
No. 7 Indiana	11	–	3	.786	20	–	4	.833
Illinois	8	–	6	.571	16	–	7	.696
Minnesota	8	–	6	.571	12	–	12	.500
Northwestern	8	–	6	.571	11	–	12	.478
Iowa	6	–	8	.429	14	–	10	.583
Purdue	6	–	8	.429	11	–	12	.478
Michigan State	5	–	9	.357	10	–	11	.476
Wisconsin	4	–	10	.286	8	–	16	.333
Michigan	1	–	13	.071	4	–	20	.167
Rankings from AP Poll

The 1959–60 Wisconsin Badgers men's basketball team represented University of Wisconsin–Madison. The head coach was John Erickson, coaching his first season with the Badgers. The team played their home games at the UW Fieldhouse in Madison, Wisconsin and was a member of the Big Ten Conference.

== Schedule ==
Date time, TV	Rank^{#}	Opponent^{#}	Result	Record	Site city, state
Regular Season
12/01/1959*		Butler	L 82–88	0–1	UW Fieldhouse; Madison, WI
12/05/1959*; 1:30 pm		Iowa State	L 53–71	0–2	UW Fieldhouse; Madison, WI
12/07/1959*		at Notre Dame	L 58–78	0–3	Notre Dame Fieldhouse; Notre Dame, IN
12/12/1959*		Loyola (IL)	W 85–67	1–3	UW Fieldhouse; Madison, WI
12/14/1959*		at Missouri	L 66–78	1–4	Brewer Fieldhouse; Columbia, MO
12/19/1959*		at Marquette	L 66–84	1–5	Marquette Gymnasium; Milwaukee, WI
12/21/1959*		Stanford	W 61–60	2–5	UW Fieldhouse; Madison, WI
12/26/1959*		vs. Boston College; Queen City Tournament	W 95–82	3–5	Buffalo Memorial Auditorium; Buffalo, NY
12/28/1959*		vs. Canisius; Queen City Tournament	L 65–80	3–6	Buffalo Memorial Auditorium; Buffalo, NY
1/02/1960		Michigan State	L 79–91	3–7 (0–1)	UW Fieldhouse; Madison, WI
1/04/1960		Iowa	L 64–71	3–8 (0–2)	UW Fieldhouse; Madison, WI
1/09/1960		at Purdue	L 69–99	3–9 (0–3)	Lambert Fieldhouse; West Lafayette, IN
1/11/1960		Northwestern	L 69–77	3–10 (0–4)	UW Fieldhouse; Madison, WI
1/27/1960*		North Dakota	W 92–80	4–10	UW Fieldhouse; Madison, WI
1/30/1960		at Minnesota	L 72–86	4–11 (0–5)	Williams Arena; Minneapolis, MN
2/06/1960		Indiana	L 85–97	4–12 (0–6)	UW Fieldhouse; Madison, WI
2/08/1960		No. 4 Ohio State	L 69–106	4–13 (0–7)	UW Fieldhouse; Madison, WI
2/13/1960		at Indiana	L 71–91	4–14 (0–8)	The Fieldhouse; Bloomington, IN
2/15/1960		at Iowa	W 63–58	5–14 (1–8)	Iowa Field House; Iowa City, IA
2/20/1960		Illinois	W 75–63	6–14 (2–8)	UW Fieldhouse; Madison, WI
2/22/1960		at Michigan	W 88–82 ^{OT}	7–14 (3–8)	Yost Fieldhouse; Ann Arbor, MI
2/27/1960		at No. 2 Ohio State	L 69–93	7–15 (3–9)	St. John Arena; Columbus, OH
2/29/1960		at Northwestern	L 59–73	7–16 (3–10)	Welsh-Ryan Arena; Evanston, IL
3/05/1960		Purdue	W 89–80	8–16 (4–10)	UW Fieldhouse; Madison, WI
*Non-conference game. ^{#}Rankings from AP Poll. (#) Tournament seedings in parentheses.
