= A. J. Epenesa =

American football player (born 1998)

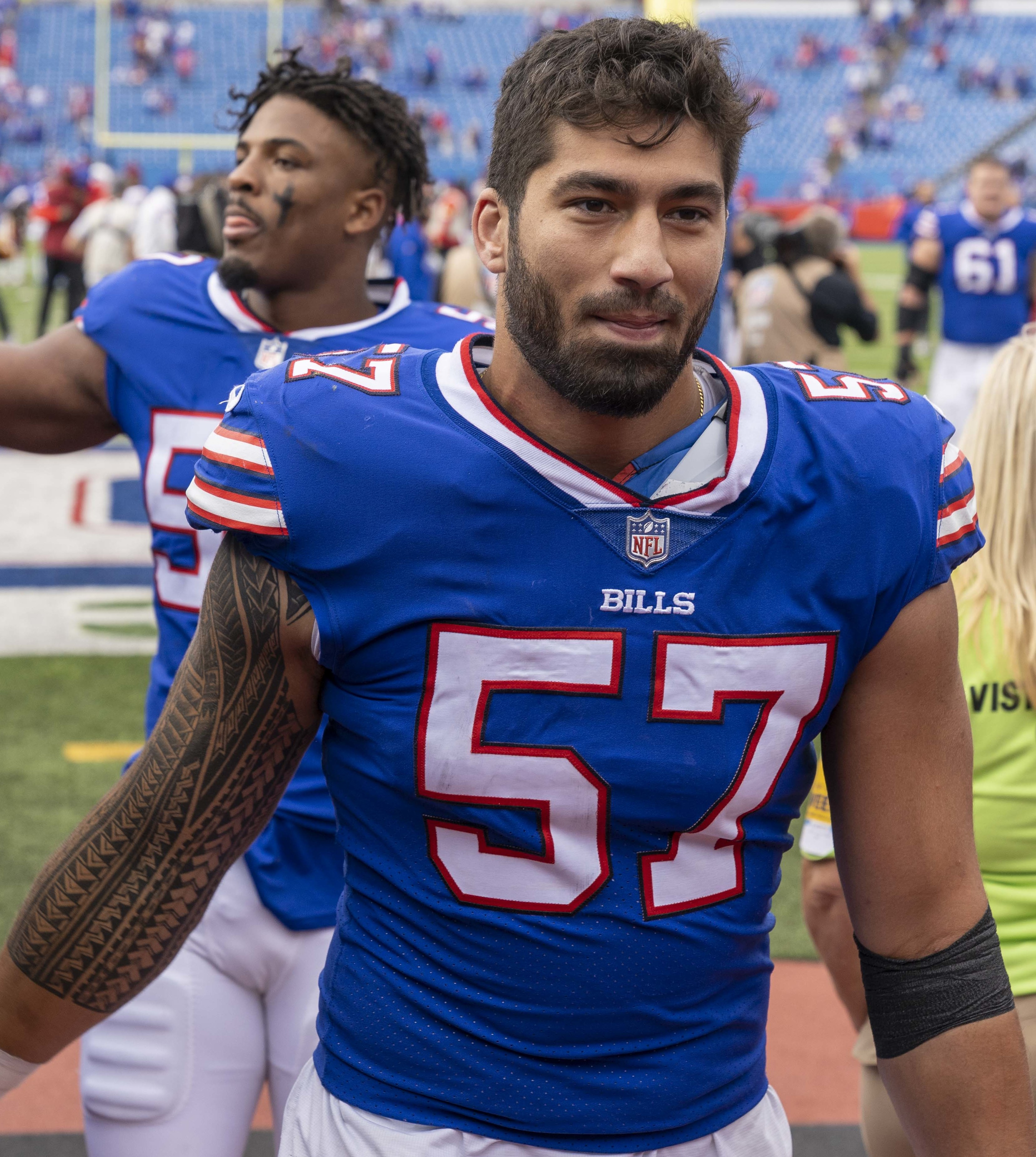
- Epenesa with the Buffalo Bills in 2021

No. 57 – Philadelphia Eagles
- Position: Outside linebacker
- Roster status: Active

Personal information
- Born: September 15, 1998 (age 28); Oak Park, Kansas, U.S.
- Listed height: 6 ft 6 in (1.98 m)
- Listed weight: 260 lb (118 kg)

Career information
- High school: Edwardsville (Edwardsville, Illinois)
- College: Iowa (2017–2019)
- NFL draft: 2020: 2nd round, 54th overall pick

Career history
- Buffalo Bills (2020–2025); Philadelphia Eagles (2026–present)

Awards and highlights
- Second-team All-American (2019); 2× First-team All-Big Ten (2018, 2019); Big Ten All-Freshman Team (2017)

Career NFL statistics as of 2025
- Total tackles: 135
- Sacks: 24
- Forced fumbles: 5
- Fumble recoveries: 3
- Pass deflections: 21
- Interceptions: 4
- Defensive touchdowns: 1
- Stats at Pro Football Reference

Andrew Jared Epenesa (born September 15, 1998) is an American professional football outside linebacker for the Philadelphia Eagles of the National Football League (NFL). He played college football for the Iowa Hawkeyes and was selected by the Buffalo Bills in the second round of the 2020 NFL draft.

== Early life ==
Playing at Edwardsville High School in Edwardsville, Illinois, Epenesa garnered All-American honors in both football and track. His father, Eppy, walked on to the Iowa football team after moving from American Samoa, and A. J. showed leanings towards Iowa throughout the recruiting process. On January 17, 2016, Epenesa committed to Iowa. He became the highest-rated recruit to play for a Kirk Ferentz-led team at Iowa. He also played in the Army All-American Bowl and Polynesian Bowl after his senior year.

Epenesa also won Illinois state titles in discus throw his junior and senior years.

== College career ==
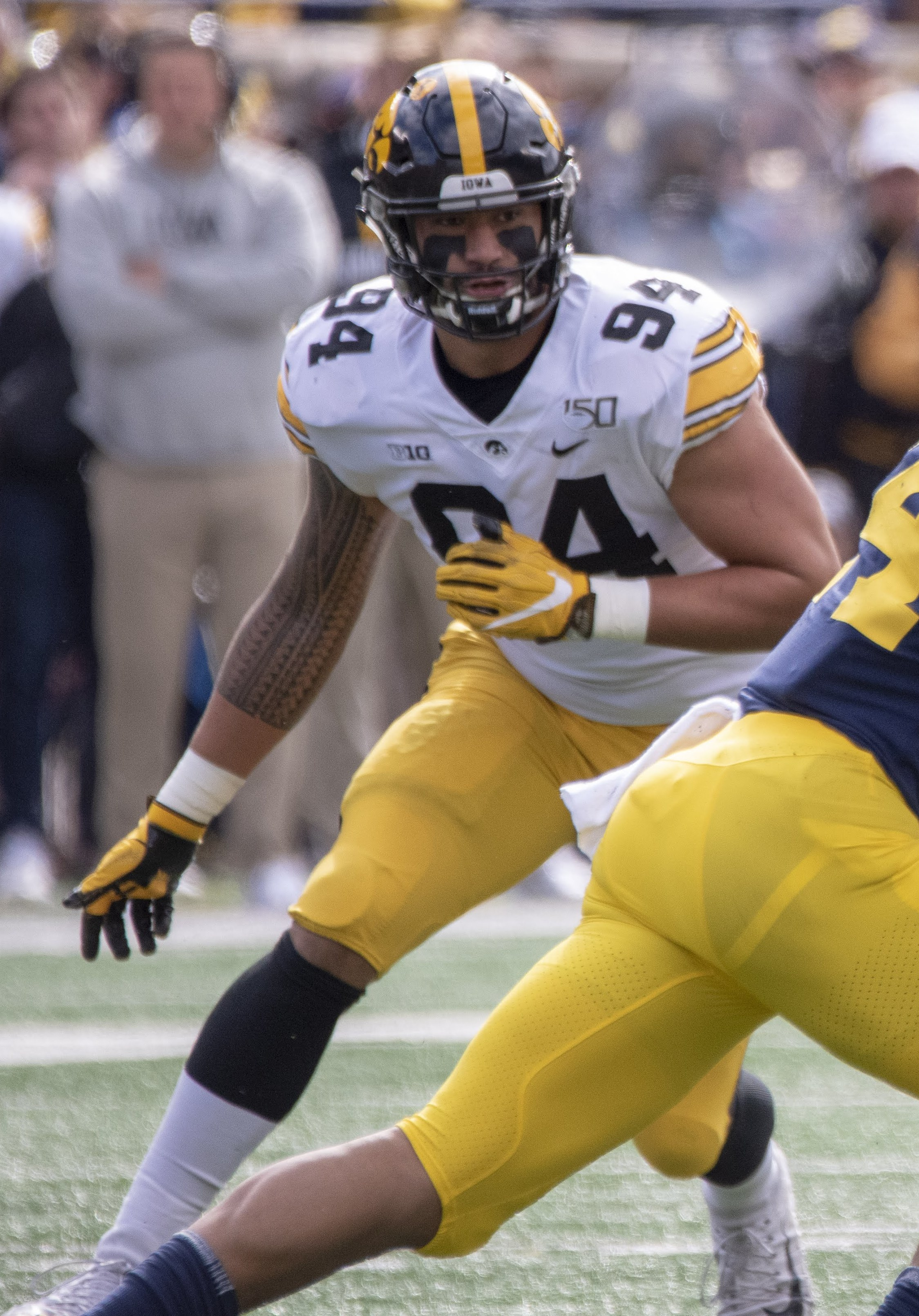
Epenesa playing for Iowa in 2019

After his freshman season, Epenesa was named to the All-Freshmen Big Ten Conference team. Notably, his first college sack came against future Buffalo Bills teammate Josh Allen during a game against Wyoming.

Epenesa did not start any games during his sophomore season, but still broke into the double digits for sacks and returned a fumble recovery for a touchdown. His 11 sacks on the year led the Big Ten, and his four fumble recoveries tied for the conference lead. He was named Big Ten Defensive Player of the Week after games against Iowa State and Illinois. Epenesa was named first-team All-Big Ten by the media and second-team by the coaches.

Before his junior season, Epenesa was projected as a first-round pick in the 2020 NFL draft, with some estimations placing him as high as second. Scouts touted both his strength and work ethic on the field. Following a junior season with 11.5 sacks, 4 forced fumbles, and 49 tackles, Epenesa announced that he would forgo his senior year and declare for the 2020 NFL Draft. After three seasons, he finished tied for 4th on Iowa's career sacks list.

Epenesa, who is of Samoan ethnicity, was named to the preseason Polynesian College Player of the Year Watch List in 2018 and 2019. He was one of five finalists for the award in 2018.

== Professional career ==
Pre-draft measurables
Height	Weight	Arm length	Hand span	Wingspan	40-yard dash	10-yard split	20-yard split	20-yard shuttle	Three-cone drill	Vertical jump	Broad jump	Bench press
6 ft 5 1/8 in (1.96 m)	275 lb (125 kg)	34 1/2 in (0.88 m)	10 1/8 in (0.26 m)	6 ft 9 1/4 in (2.06 m)	5.04 s	1.78 s	2.96 s	4.46 s	7.34 s	32.5 in (0.83 m)	9 ft 9 in (2.97 m)	17 reps
All values from NFL Combine

=== Buffalo Bills ===
The Buffalo Bills selected Epenesa in the second round, 54th overall, of the 2020 NFL draft. He signed a four-year, $5.877 million contract, including a $1.834 million signing bonus, with the Bills on May 7, 2020.

In Week 3 of the 2020 season, Epenesa recorded his first career sack in a 35–32 win over the Los Angeles Rams, tackling quarterback Jared Goff during the first quarter. Epenesa finished his rookie season with 1 sack and 14 tackles, playing mainly as a backup defensive end, but earned a more prominent role on the team by the end of the season and dropped 20 pounds from his college playing weight of 280 pounds.

After the drafting of Gregory Rousseau in the first round of the following draft and the Bills signing All-Pro pass rusher Von Miller the 2022 offseason, Epenesa continued as a rotational piece on the Bills' defensive line the next two years. He notably had a strong performance during a 35–0 Bills win against the Miami Dolphins in week 2 of the 2021 season, recording a team-leading 8 quarterback pressures and 2 quarterback hits, including one that knocked Dolphins quarterback Tua Tagovailoa out of the game.

Epenesa had a breakout season in 2022, recording 6.5 sacks, 10 quarterback hits, 14 quarterback pressures, 16 total tackles, and 5 passes deflected, in addition to a fumble recovery, all career highs. In week 5 of the 2022 season against the Pittsburgh Steelers, Epenesa was ejected from the game with one minute left after he elbowed referee John Hussey in response to being pushed by the former during a brief ruckus between the Bills and Steelers that began when Pittsburgh quarterback Kenny Pickett shoved Bills defender Shaq Lawson for a late hit. His best game of the season came against the New York Jets in week 14, in which he had a sack, five tackles, and a pass breakup on what would become New York's final offensive snap to seal a 20–12 Bills win. The Bills defensive line as a whole performed well despite a season-ending injury to Miller the previous week.

In Week 3 of the 2023 season against the Washington Commanders, Epenesa scored his first career defensive touchdown, intercepting Washington quarterback Sam Howell and returning the pass for a 32-yard touchdown during the Bills' 37–3 win. He notably became the first alumnus of Edwardsville High School to score a touchdown in the NFL since Morris Bradshaw in 1982.

On March 11, 2024, Epenesa signed a two-year contract extension with the Bills.

On March 18, 2026, Epenesa agreed to sign a one-year, $5 million contract with the Cleveland Browns. However, on March 29, it was announced that deal had fallen through, with Cleveland feeling not "comfortable finalizing the deal after his physical."

=== Philadelphia Eagles ===
On June 10, 2026, Epenesa signed a contract with the Philadelphia Eagles.

== Career statistics ==
Legend
**Bold**	Career high

=== NFL ===
==== Regular season ====
Year	Team	Games		Tackles							Interceptions						Fumbles				
Year	Team	GP	GS	Cmb	Solo	Ast	TFL	QBH	Sck	Sfty	PD	Int	Yds	Y/I	Lng	TD	FF	FR	Yds	Y/R	TD
2020	BUF	14	1	14	11	3	3	4	1.0	0	1	0	0	—	0	0	0	0	0	—	0
2021	BUF	14	0	14	8	6	2	9	1.5	0	1	0	0	—	0	0	0	0	0	—	0
2022	BUF	15	2	16	13	3	7	10	**6.5**	0	5	0	0	—	0	0	**2**	**1**	0	0.0	0
2023	BUF	15	1	20	9	11	7	10	**6.5**	0	**8**	**2**	**38**	**19.0**	**32**	**1**	1	**1**	0	0.0	0
2024	BUF	16	12	**39**	**23**	**16**	**8**	**11**	6.0	**1**	2	0	0	—	0	0	**2**	0	0	—	0
2025	BUF	16	2	32	17	15	2	9	2.5	0	4	**2**	25	12.5	24	0	0	**1**	0	0.0	0
Career		91	19	135	81	54	29	53	24.0	1	17	4	63	15.8	32	1	5	3	0	0.0	0

==== Postseason ====
Year	Team	Games		Tackles							Interceptions						Fumbles				
Year	Team	GP	GS	Cmb	Solo	Ast	TFL	QBH	Sck	Sfty	PD	Int	Yds	Y/I	Lng	TD	FF	FR	Yds	Y/R	TD
2020	BUF	3	0	3	3	0	0	**1**	0.0	0	1	0	0	—	0	0	0	0	0	—	0
2021	BUF	2	0	2	0	2	0	0	0.0	0	1	0	0	—	0	0	0	0	0	—	0
2022	BUF	2	0	1	1	0	0	0	0.0	0	0	0	0	—	0	0	0	0	0	—	0
2023	BUF	2	0	1	1	0	1	**1**	0.0	0	1	0	0	—	0	0	0	0	0	—	0
2024	BUF	3	3	**8**	**4**	**4**	**2**	**1**	0.0	0	0	0	0	—	0	0	0	0	0	—	0
2025	BUF	2	0	2	1	1	0	0	0.0	0	**2**	0	0	—	0	0	0	0	0	—	0
Career		14	3	17	10	7	3	3	0.0	0	5	0	0	—	0	0	0	0	0	—	0

=== College ===
Year	Team	Tackles				Sacks		Fumbles	
Year	Team	Solo	Ast	Total	TFL	Total	Yards	FF	FR
2017	Iowa	8	7	15	5.5	4.5	24	1	0
2018	Iowa	21	16	37	**16.5**	10.5	66	**4**	**1**
2019	Iowa	**32**	**17**	**49**	15.0	**11.5**	**67**	**4**	0
Totals		61	40	101	37.0	26.5	157	9	1

== Personal life ==
Epenesa's cousin, Jacob Tuioti-Mariner, is also a professional defensive end and is currently a free agent. Epenesa's second cousin is Riley Patterson, a kicker for the Miami Dolphins. Epenesa's youngest brother, Iose, plays defensive end for Iowa. One of Epenesa's cousins is Dominick Puni for the San Francisco 49ers and Kansas Jayhawks.

Epenesa grew up and went to high school with professional basketball player, Kate Martin. Martin's dad, Matt Martin, was Epenesa’s football and track coach at Edwardsville High School, alongside former New York Jets cornerback Craig James and Patterson.
