= Govoner Vaughn =

American basketball player

Personal information
- Born: March 1, 1937 (age 89) Edwardsville, Illinois, U.S.
- Listed height: 6 ft 3 in (1.91 m)
- Listed weight: 185 lb (84 kg)

Career information
- High school: Edwardsville (Edwardsville, Illinois)
- College: Illinois (1957–1960)
- NBA draft: 1960: undrafted
- Position: Forward
- Number: 35

Career history
- 1960–1961: Harlem Globetrotters
- 1961–1963: Long Beach Chiefs

Career highlights
- Second-team All-Big Ten (1960)

Govoner Vaughn (born March 1, 1937) was a former high school, college and professional basketball player during the 1950s & 60s. Vaughn led Edwardsville High School to a fourth-place finish in the I.H.S.A. 1954 high school playoffs, as well as a second-place finish in 1956 to defending champion, Rockford West. Vaughn played in eight career state playoff games over two seasons, and his 92 points were all scored during the 1956 tournament. He, along with his teammate, Mannie Jackson, were named first-team all-tournament.

Vaughn went on to play for the University of Illinois for three years, 1957–1960, where he and his fellow high school teammate, Jackson, were the first African-American letter winners for the University of Illinois. Vaughn scored 1,001 career points, the 46th highest total in Illini history. He also holds the second highest single season free-throw percentage at .865, making 83 of 96 during the 1959–60 season.

After graduating from Illinois in 1960, Vaughn joined the Harlem Globetrotters. During his time with the Globetrotters, he was named MVP of the 1961 World Series of Basketball. This event was a 20-game series against the nation's top college seniors. Vaughn rejoined the Globetrotters in 2010 and served as the team's director of alumni relations after spending 24 years at Detroit Edison.

== College career ==
=== 1956–57 season ===
Vaughn played on the freshman squad, records for this season could not be added to his varsity totals.

=== 1957–58 season ===
During Vaughn's sophomore season, he started all 22 games as the team's center. He finished the season with the second highest point total (327) averaging 14.9 points per game. Only Don Ohl scored more points at 431. Vaughn, however, finished with the highest field goal average at .426 and the second highest free-throw percentage at .773, making 51 of his 66 attempts.

=== 1958–59 season ===
Even with the graduation of leading scorer Don Ohl, the Fighting Illini experienced a surge in performance sparked by the play of junior center John Wessels and Edwardsville High School teammate Mannie Jackson along with senior guard Roger Taylor. These changes, however, limited Vaughn's production and reduced his point total to 263 for the season. Even with a reduced role, Vaughn finished the season with the fourth highest point total averaging 12.5 points per game.

=== 1959–60 season ===
Vaughn was the instrumental force in the 1959–60 Illinois Fighting Illini men's basketball team. He started all 23 games during that season and dominated all offensive categories after an injury sidelined previous team-leader John Wessels. Vaughn was first on the Fighting Illini in scoring with 411 points (17.9 per game), first on the team in rebounding with 189 (8.2 per game) and first on the team in free-throw percentage at .865 (83 of 96); second on the all-time Illini record list. Vaughn was named team MVP as well as All-American for this season.

== Honors ==
=== Basketball ===
- 1958 – Honorable Mention All-American
- 1959 – Honorable Mention All-Big Ten
- 1960 – 2nd Team All-Big Ten
- 1960 – Team MVP
- 1960 – Honorable Mention All-American
- 1973 – Inducted into the Illinois Basketball Coaches Association's Hall of Fame as a player.
- 2008 – Honored jersey which hangs in the State Farm Center to show regard for being the most decorated basketball players in the University of Illinois' history.

== College ==
Season	Games	Points	PPG	Field Goals	Attempts	Avg	Free Throws	Attempts	Avg	Rebounds	Avg	Big Ten Record	Overall Record
1957–58	22	327	14.9	138	324	.426	51	66	.773	–	–	5–9	11–11
1958–59	21	263	12.5	110	289	.381	43	67	.642	170	8.1	7–7	12–10
1959–60	23	411	17.9	164	357	.459	83	96	.865	187	8.1	8–6	16–7
Totals	66	1001	15.2	412	970	.425	177	229	.773	357	8.1	20–22	39–28
