= Riley Patterson =

American football player (born 1999)

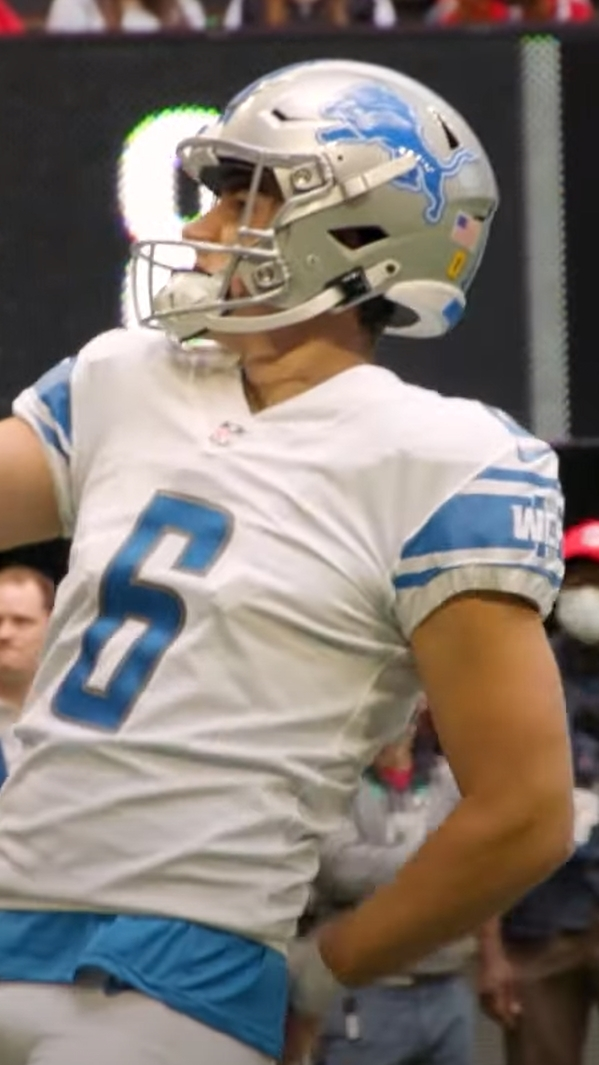
- Patterson with the Detroit Lions in 2021

No. 35 – Baltimore Ravens
- Position: Placekicker
- Roster status: Active

Personal information
- Born: September 7, 1999 (age 27); Edwardsville, Illinois, U.S.
- Listed height: 6 ft 0 in (1.83 m)
- Listed weight: 196 lb (89 kg)

Career information
- High school: Edwardsville
- College: Memphis (2017–2020)
- NFL draft: 2021: undrafted

Career history
- Minnesota Vikings (2021)*; New England Patriots (2021)*; Detroit Lions (2021); Jacksonville Jaguars (2022); Detroit Lions (2023); Cleveland Browns (2023); Jacksonville Jaguars (2024)*; Washington Commanders (2024)*; New York Jets (2024); Atlanta Falcons (2024); Cleveland Browns (2024); Atlanta Falcons (2024); Miami Dolphins (2025–2026); Baltimore Ravens (2026–present)
- * Offseason or practice squad member only

Career NFL statistics as of Week 10, 2026
- Field goals made: 99
- Field goals attempted: 114
- Field goal %: 86.8%
- Extra points made: 150
- Extra points attempted: 156
- Extra point %: 96.2%
- Points: 447
- Longest field goal: 54
- Touchbacks: 70
- Stats at Pro Football Reference

Riley Patterson (born September 7, 1999) is an American professional football kicker for the Baltimore Ravens of the National Football League (NFL). He played college football for the Memphis Tigers and has previously played in the NFL for the Detroit Lions, Jacksonville Jaguars, Cleveland Browns, New York Jets and Miami Dolphins.

== Early life ==
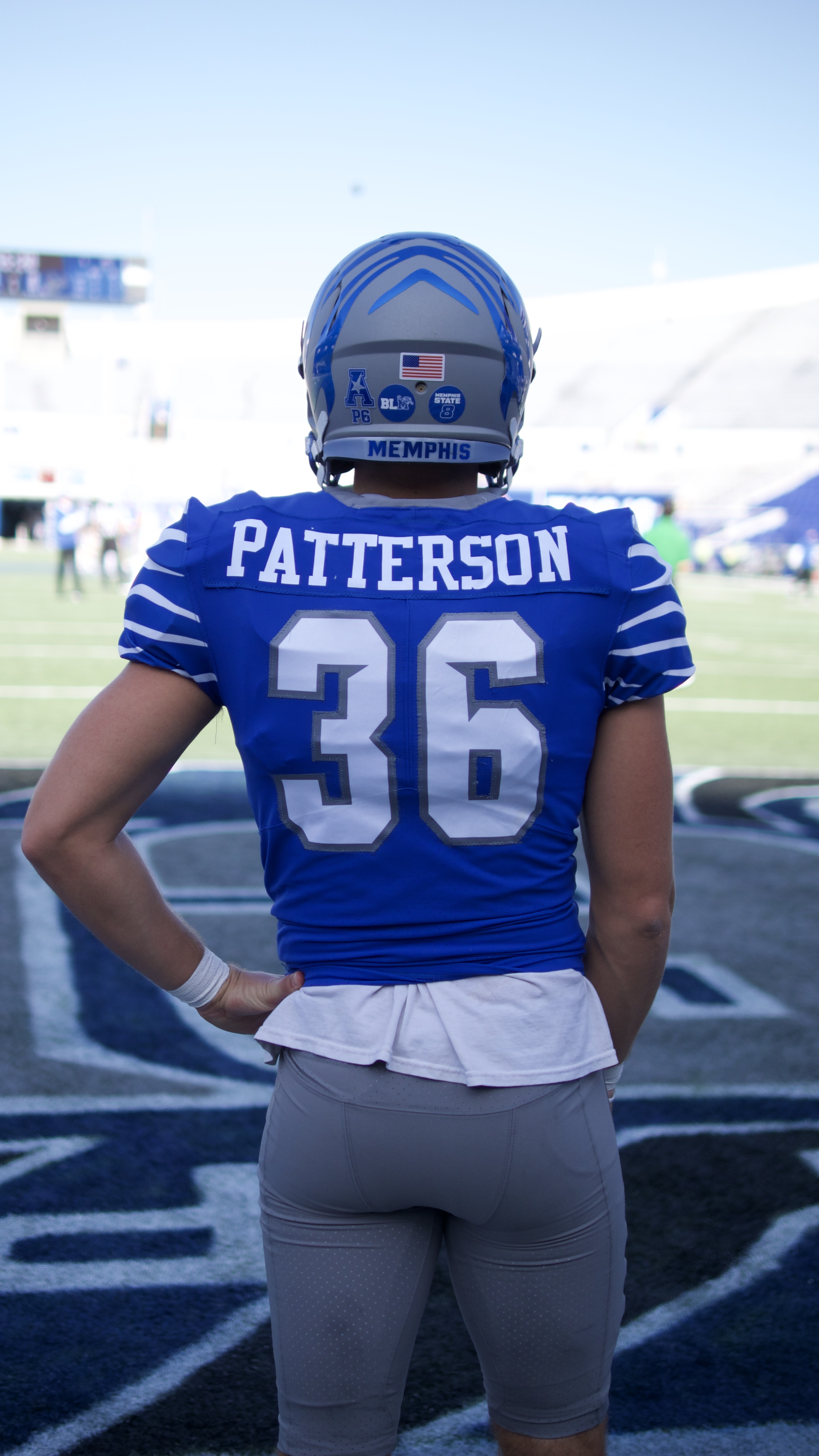
Patterson with the Memphis Tigers in 2020

Patterson was born on September 7, 1999, in Edwardsville, Illinois. He attended Edwardsville High School and played college football for the Memphis Tigers, playing 41 games and scoring 351 points. He participated in the 2021 Senior Bowl, making two field goal attempts.

== Professional career ==
Pre-draft measurables
Height	Weight	Arm length	Hand span	Wingspan
5 ft 10 1/4 in (1.78 m)	181 lb (82 kg)	30 1/2 in (0.77 m)	8 3/8 in (0.21 m)	6 ft 0 1/4 in (1.84 m)
All values from Pro Day

=== Minnesota Vikings ===
Patterson signed with the Minnesota Vikings as an undrafted free agent on May 5, 2021. He was waived/injured on August 16 and placed on injured reserve. He was released on August 25 with an injury settlement.

=== New England Patriots ===
On October 19, 2021, Patterson was signed to the practice squad of the New England Patriots.

=== Detroit Lions (first stint) ===
On November 16, 2021, Patterson was signed by the Detroit Lions off the Patriots practice squad. Patterson made two extra points in his NFL debut against the Chicago Bears. Patterson made his first field goal against the Minnesota Vikings on December 5, 2021. In Week 15, Patterson converted all three field goals and all three extra points in a 30–12 win over the Arizona Cardinals, earning National Football Conference Special Teams Player of the Week.

Patterson was waived on August 30, 2022.

=== Jacksonville Jaguars (first stint) ===
Patterson was claimed off waivers by the Jacksonville Jaguars on August 31, 2022. In Week 16, Patterson scored 13 points on four field goals and one extra point in a 19–3 win over the New York Jets, earning American Football Conference Special Teams Player of the Week. On January 14, 2023, Patterson kicked the game-winning field goal to help the Jaguars complete a 31–30 come back win over the Los Angeles Chargers in the Wild Card Round, completing the third largest comeback in playoff history. He was waived by the Jaguars on May 25, following the signing of Brandon McManus, before later being traded back to the Lions.

=== Detroit Lions (second stint) ===
Following his announced release from Jacksonville on May 25, 2023, Patterson was traded to the Lions in exchange for an undisclosed draft pick. Patterson was inactive on December 17, 2023, due to missing two extra points in three games. He was replaced by Michael Badgley. On December 19, Patterson was waived by the Lions.

=== Cleveland Browns (first stint) ===
On December 25, 2023, Patterson was signed to the Cleveland Browns' practice squad following an injury to their starting kicker Dustin Hopkins. He was elevated to the roster and played in his first game with them on December 28. He was not signed to a reserve/future contract by the team after the season and thus became a free agent upon the expiration of his practice squad contract.

=== Jacksonville Jaguars (second stint) ===
Patterson returned to the Jaguars by signing a reserve/future contract with the team on February 6, 2024. Patterson lost out early in training camp to sixth-round draft choice Cam Little for a roster spot. He was waived by the team on July 29, 2024.

=== Washington Commanders ===
Patterson was claimed off waivers by the Washington Commanders on July 31, 2024. He was released by the Commanders on August 22.

=== New York Jets ===
On October 30, 2024, Patterson signed with the New York Jets practice squad. The next day, they promoted Patterson to the active roster to play against the Houston Texans. He was released on November 8.

=== Atlanta Falcons (first stint) ===
On November 29, 2024, Patterson was signed to the Atlanta Falcons' practice squad; he was released four days later.

=== Cleveland Browns (second stint) ===
On December 10, 2024, the Cleveland Browns signed Patterson to their practice squad.

=== Atlanta Falcons (second stint) ===
On December 18, 2024, the Atlanta Falcons signed Patterson to their active roster off the Browns practice squad. Patterson appeared in three games as a starter against the New York Giants, Washington Commanders, and Carolina Panthers, going 4-for-7 in field goals in those games, with a long of 52. In a Week 17 overtime loss to the Commanders, Patterson missed the game winning 56-yard field goal, which would have been his career long.

=== Miami Dolphins ===
On August 27, 2025, Patterson was signed to the Miami Dolphins' practice squad following an injury to Jason Sanders. He was signed to the active roster on September 29.

On March 12, 2026, Patterson re-signed with the Dolphins. However, on October 20, the Dolphins released Patterson.

=== Baltimore Ravens ===
On November 11, 2026, the Baltimore Ravens signed Patterson to their active roster.

== NFL career statistics ==
Year	Team	GP	Field goals									Extra points			Total points
Year	Team	GP	FGM	FGA	FG%	<20	20−29	30−39	40−49	50+	Lng	XPM	XPA	XP%	Total points
2021	DET	7	13	14	92.9	0−0	3−3	6−6	4−4	0−1	49	16	16	100.0	55
2022	JAX	17	30	35	85.7	0−0	8−8	10−11	10−13	2−3	53	36	37	97.3	126
2023	DET	13	15	17	88.2	0–0	2–3	10–10	2–2	1–2	52	35	37	94.6	80
2023	CLE	2	1	1	100.0	0−0	0–0	1–1	0–0	0–0	33	6	7	85.7	9
2024	NYJ	1	0	0	0	0	0	0	0	0	0	3	3	100.0	3
2024	CLE	1	0	0	0	0-0	2–2	0–0	0–0	0–0	36	1	1	100.0	1
2024	ATL	3	4	7	57.1	0−0	0–0	3–3	0–1	1–3	52	12	12	100.0	24
2025	MIA	17	27	29	93.1	0−0	5−5	8−9	11−11	3−4	54	34	35	97.1	115
2026	MIA	5	7	9	77.7	0−0	4−4	2−2	1−2	0−1	41	5	6	83.3	26
2026	BAL	1	2	2	100.0	0−0	1–1	1–1	0–0	0–0	36	2	2	100.0	8
Total		67	99	114	86.8	0−0	23–24	41–43	28–33	7–14	54	150	156	96.2	447

== Personal life ==
Patterson is an Evangelical Christian. He is married to Claire Patterson. His second cousin is NFL player A. J. Epenesa. The father of WNBA player Kate Martin was Patterson's football coach at Edwardsville High School.
