= William Perigo =

American basketball player and coach

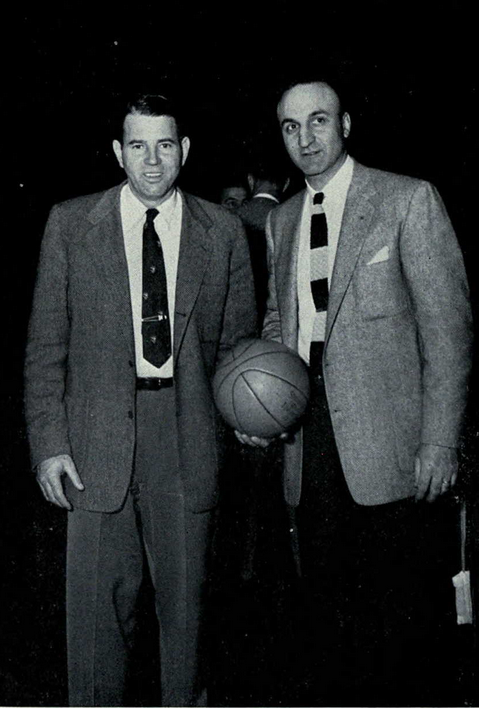
- Perigo (left) and Matt Patanelli from 1955 Michiganensian

Personal information
- Born: September 17, 1911 Lebanon, Indiana, U.S.
- Died: February 7, 1990 (aged 78) Saline, Michigan, U.S.
- Listed height: 6 ft 0 in (1.83 m)
- Listed weight: 185 lb (84 kg)

Career information
- High school: Delphi (Delphi, Indiana)
- College: Western Michigan (1931–1934)
- Playing career: 1934–1939
- Position: Center
- Coaching career: 1934–1960

Career history

Playing
- 1934–1936: Indianapolis Kautskys
- 1937–1939: Whiting/Hammond Ciesar All-Americans

Coaching
- 1934–1936: Markleville HS
- 1936–1949: Benton Harbor HS
- 1949–1952: Western Michigan
- 1952–1960: Michigan

Career coaching record
- College: 119–127 (.484)

William J. Perigo (September 17, 1911 – February 7, 1990) was an American basketball player and coach. He played college basketball for Western Michigan University from 1931 to 1934 and professional basketball for the Indianapolis Kautskys from 1934 to 1936. Perigo also worked as a basketball coach for more than 25 years. He was the basketball coach at Benton Harbor High School for 13 years and led the team to the Michigan Class A state championship in 1941. He was the head basketball coach at Western Michigan University (1949–1952) and the University of Michigan (1952–1960). In 1983, he was inducted into the Indiana Basketball Hall of Fame.

== Early years and college basketball ==
Perigo was born in Lebanon, Indiana in 1911. His father, Alonzo Lon Perigo, was a farmer in Boone County, Indiana. Perigo graduated from Delphi High School in Indiana in 1930. He twice helped lead Delphi to the Indiana state finals and was "considered the greatest jumping center of his era." He enrolled at Western Michigan University and graduated in 1934. He played three years of varsity basketball at Western Michigan, during which time Western Michigan compiled a 40–13 record.

== Professional basketball ==
In the 1930s, Perigo played professional basketball for the Indianapolis Kautskys. During the 1934–35 season, the Kautskys, featuring Perigo and John Wooden, had a 15-game winning streak.

== Coaching career ==
Perigo was a basketball coach for more than 25 years at the high school and collegiate levels. He coached high school basketball in Markleville, Indiana (two years) and Benton Harbor, Michigan (13 years) before moving to the collegiate level. His Benton Harbor teams won 13 Southwest Conference titles and the Michigan Class A basketball championship in 1941.

Perigo became a friend of John Wooden when the two played professional basketball together for the Kautskys. When Perigo coached high school basketball at Benton Harbor, Wooden lived a short distance away in South Bend, Indiana. During those years, Wooden and his wife often drove to Benton Harbor for Sunday dinners with the Perigos. Wooden also visited practice sessions and offered coaching tips to Perigo.

Perigo was the head basketball coach at Western Michigan University (1949–1952) and the University of Michigan (1952–1960). He compiled a 41–27 (.603) in three years at Western Michigan. In July 1952, he was hired by the University of Michigan as its head basketball coach. In eight years as the head coach of the Michigan Wolverines men's basketball team, Perigo compiled a 78–100 (.438) record. His record in Big Ten Conference games while at Michigan was 38–78. Perigo's best season at Michigan came with the 1958–59 Michigan Wolverines men's basketball team, captained by M. C. Burton, Jr., which compiled a 15–7 (.682) record. Perrigo resigned as Michigan's head basketball coach in May 1960 after the 1959–60 Michigan Wolverines men's basketball team finished with a 1–13 record against Big Ten Conference opponents. Perigo told the press at the time that he planned to obtain a master's degree and pursue a career in teaching or athletic administration.

== Later years and death ==
Perigo remained in Ann Arbor after resigning his coaching position, and worked as an administrator until he retired in 1970. He was inducted into the Indiana Basketball Hall of Fame in 1983. Perigo died in Ann Arbor in 1990 at age 78.
