= Mannie Jackson =

American sports executive

Personal information
- Born: May 4, 1939 (age 87) Illmo, Missouri, U.S.
- Listed height: 6 ft 3 in (1.91 m)
- Listed weight: 175 lb (79 kg)

Career information
- High school: Edwardsville (Edwardsville, Illinois)
- College: Illinois (1957–1960)
- Position: Guard
- Number: 30

Career history
- 1960–1961: New York Tapers
- 1962–1964: Harlem Globetrotters

Career highlights
- 1st African-American owner of major sports corporation; 1st African-American Fighting Illini basketball player; Theodore Roosevelt Award (2015); University of Illinois Honored Jersey (2013); Chairman, Basketball Hall of Fame, (2007–09); All-American (1960); 2x All-Big Ten (1959, 1960)
- Basketball Hall of Fame

Mannie Jackson (born May 4, 1939) is the chairman and co-owner of the Harlem Globetrotters, for whom he played from 1962 to 1964. He was the first African American with controlling ownership in an entertainment organization and international sports team. Jackson has been heavily recognized throughout his career including an acknowledgment as one of the nation's 30 most powerful and influential black corporate executives, one of the nation's top 50 corporate strategists, and one of the 20 African-American high-net-worth entrepreneurs.

== Early life ==
Mannie Jackson was born to Emmet and Margaret Jackson in Illmo, Missouri. He was born and lived in a boxcar. He was raised in an environment of great poverty, often living with 12 family members. His family then moved to Edwardsville, Illinois, where his father worked in automobile plants and his mother cleaned houses. Mannie was three at the time of this move to escape the Illmo floods. Mannie's father, Emmett, worked for the A. O. Smith Co. in Granite City, Illinois, which made large auto frames for General Motors. He also tended bar at the country club and gun club in Edwardsville. He worked two jobs while studying to be a teacher at Shurtleff College in Alton. Mannie adds, "He was an inspiration to me. ... Here's this guy who came out of the military after the war, had three kids, worked two jobs, went to college, and he did all this in the most racist part of the world you can be in. He never lost his drive." School segregation ended in Edwardsville just before Mannie Jackson went to high school. He was among the second group of black students to enroll in Edwardsville High. The town previously had an all-black high school called Lincoln. Jackson comments, "There were seven of us, four guys and three girls. Some of them were traumatized by this. It all points up the amount of waste that residual racism caused, the waste of human resources. If I show my Honeywell card, they look at it and figure I have an important job with a major corporation. They nod and smile. If I show my Globetrotter card, they want me to come home and meet their family. This is ours—our heritage, something that's uniquely African-American."

In 1989, Jackson visited the Edwardsville YMCA during an opening of the new addition. He said, "I remember the 'Y' of the early '50s as an organization without the usual level of institutionalized racism. It provided programs that actually encouraged the interaction of all citizens of Edwardsville, when most of our other institutions at the time routinely excluded black people. Most young people are unable to achieve what they cannot visualize. Therefore, our youth need to be shown in somewhat graphic form role models and patterns of success and tolerance. Believe me, they will never achieve what they don't see. We have observed that the better-prepared soil seems always to produce the strongest plants. Thank you for preparing the soil in Edwardsville."

Jackson attended Edwardsville High school where he began to demonstrate his superior skills in basketball. In 1956, he led his team for the first time to the state's championship finals, where they lost to Rockford West. At Edwardsville High School, Jackson made first team All-State and received a full scholarship to play at the University of Illinois. While at Edwardsville High School, Jackson was inspired by coach Joe Lucco. I think we taught him a lot more than basketball, and he taught us a lot, " said Lucco, 81, a legendary coach in the old Southwestern Conference. "He was the epitome of youth, and a real gentleman. He had brains, too." Jackson added, "He taught me how to tie a tie. He would take us along when he spoke at various high school banquets around the state. He always insisted we wear a coat and tie. Edwardsville native, Andrew Razeghi, author of Hope: How Triumphant Leaders Create the Future notes Mannie's gift to instill hope not only in himself but in others.

Jackson, along with team member Govoner Vaughn, were the first African Americans to start at the University of Illinois. During his collegiate career, Jackson often faced racism by many of the university’s fans and students. Despite this, Jackson was an outstanding player and, along with Vaughn, became the first African-American lettermen at the university and graduated in 1960.

== Career ==
Upon his graduation, Jackson tried out for the New York Knicks, but failed to make the squad. Instead, he was invited to try out for the Harlem Globetrotters, a team that toured the United States and Europe, performing basketball tricks. His career as a Globetrotter was short-lived, as he left the team in 1964 to study economics and work with General Motors in Detroit. In 1986, he received a job at Honeywell, Inc. and was quickly promoted to higher positions, soon becoming one of the company’s highest executives.

In 1986, Mannie Jackson helped to found the Executive Leadership Council, which was a group of African American corporate executives from various industries that would interact and build strong ties with one another.

In 1993, when the Harlem Globetrotters’ popularity was beginning to decline, and the team was nearly bankrupt, Jackson purchased the team for $5.5 million. In order to regain the team's fans, Jackson replaced many of the older players for younger ones, and placed a new focus on skilled showmanship. This move proved successful, helping the Harlem Globetrotters to regain its status as one of America's favorite teams.

Under Jackson's watch, the Globetrotters experienced an average annual revenue growth rate of 14 percent over 14 years. Over time, Jackson bought out the other investors. By 2006, when the team was sold it was valued at $100 million. Jackson remained non-executive chairman until 2011, and continues to hold a 20 percent stake. Jackson said, "Fifteen years is a long time to run, and I ran hard for 15 years."

Jackson is currently married to his wife Cathy, and has two daughters and a son.

== Awards ==
- 2010 – Inducted as a laureate of The Lincoln Academy of Illinois.
- 2010 – Awarded the Order of Lincoln (the State's highest honor) by the governor of Illinois in the area of Sports.

== Honors ==
=== Basketball ===
- 1959 – Honorable Mention All-Big Ten
- 1960 – 2nd Team All-Big Ten
- 1960 – Team Captain
- 1960 – Honorable Mention All-American
- 1973 – Inducted into the Illinois Basketball Coaches Association's Hall of Fame as a player.
- 2008 – Honored jersey which hangs in the State Farm Center to show regard for being the most decorated basketball players in the University of Illinois' history.
- 2017 – Inducted into the Naismith Memorial Basketball Hall of Fame
- 2017 – Inducted into the Illinois Athletics Hall of Fame

== Legacy ==
The Mannie Jackson Basketball's Human Spirit Award is given annually by the Naismith Memorial Basketball Hall of Fame to an individual who has found the game of basketball to be a contributing aspect to their personal growth and accomplishment, a place to develop an understanding of others, and an avenue that helped shape that individual's growth into a recognized visionary and leader.
