= Edwardsville High School =

American high school in southern Illinois

Location
- 6161 Center Grove Road; Edwardsville, Illinois 62025; United States; 38.78913°N 89.975567°W

Information
- Type: Public high school
- Opened: 1921; 105 years ago
- School district: District 7
- Superintendent: Allen Duncan
- Principal: Alex Fox
- Teaching staff: 136.49 (FTE)
- Grades: 9–12
- Gender: Coed
- Enrollment: 2,342 (2023–24)
- Student to teacher ratio: 17.16
- Colors: Orange and black
- Fight song: "Go Tigers"
- Athletics conference: Southwestern Conference
- Nickname: Tigers
- Newspaper: Tiger Times (online), The Claw (print)
- Yearbook: The Tiger
- Website: ecusd7.org/ehs

Edwardsville Senior High School is a public high school located in Edwardsville, Illinois.

== History ==
Edwardsville High School was first located on North Kansas Street in downtown Edwardsville. Due to the expansion of the town, a new high school was commissioned in 1921. Today, the first building is Columbus Elementary School. The second Edwardsville High School was completed in 1925, on 145 West Street. Rather than rebuild a bigger school, it was expanded over the years to meet the demands of the growing school district.

In 1993, Edwardsville High school was unable to be expanded any longer, and a motion was passed to turn the old High School into a middle school, and build a new state of the art High School at 6161 Center Grove Road. The current Edwardsville High School complex was completed in 1996 by the Korte Company and began regular use in 1997

In September 2024, the High School began an expansion project that increased the size of the cafeteria and commons to address overcrowding and improve safety during lunchtime. The expansion added 8,000 square feet and increased capacity to around 900 students. It features large floor-to-ceiling windows to increase natural lighting and create a more open and inviting atmosphere for students to gather and eat. The expansion of the commons was completed for the new school year in August 2025; students also noticed design changes such as the incorporation of school colors, better lighting, and extra space on the second floor. In addition to a redesign of the cafeteria, there was also the installation of 18 gender-neutral, single-stall restrooms adjacent to the commons. The stalls were isolated rooms with large doors so students can have maximum privacy, while the shared sink area remains visible from the main lobby to ensure better security and staff monitoring.

== Features ==
Edwardsville High School's Chuck Fruit aquatic center is home to the only Olympic size swimming pool in the Metro East.

== Athletics ==
Edwardsville High School competes in the Illinois Southwestern Conference. The associated sports include: boys and girls basketball, boys baseball, boys and girls bowling, boys and girls cross country, boys football, boys and girls golf, boys and girls ice hockey, girls lacrosse, boys and girls soccer, girls softball, boys and girls swimming, boys and girls tennis, boys and girls track and field, boys and girls volleyball, boys and girls wrestling, girls cheerleading, girls dance team, girls field hockey, girls flag football, boys and girls bass fishing.

The school has won a number of state championships:

Boys Baseball: 1990, 1998, 2019, 2022, 2023

Boys Track and Field: 2015, 2017, 2024

Boys Soccer: 2000, 2014

== Incidents ==
The school has been the target of several bomb and shooting threats, most notably in 2004, 2010, 2014, and 2018.

In November 2019, several fights broke out following the circulation of racially charged posts on Snapchat that led to school disruptions and increased security measures. The incidents began when inflammatory statements targeting African-Americans were shared across several social media platforms, primarily Snapchat, which triggered a series of physical altercations between groups of students on and off of the school's campus. In the week following the spread of the offensive post, a number of white male students engaged in further provocative behavior, most notably when a student inscribed several anti-African American slurs onto the side of his pickup truck, and paraded the message around the school's parking lot and surrounding neighborhoods. The situation escalated to the point where a student created a social media post threatening to bring a gun to the high school, though this threat was later determined to be false. School administrators responded by implementing a temporary increased police presence at the high school to ensure student safety and manage the emerging tensions.

In May 2023, Edwardsville High School was involved in controversy after another racist Snapchat post, allegedly created by a student, was reported to school administrators. The post contained offensive content and led to an investigation in coordination with the Edwardsville Police Department.

Both the 2019 and 2023 incidents were part of a broader pattern of reported racial harassment that continued in subsequent years, as highlighted by community members during school board meetings. Parents, including Scott Ahart, a 1985 alumnus, and Donna Charleston, openly criticized the persistence of racist behaviors among students, describing incidents such as students being called racial slurs, being referred to as "slaves," and experiencing racially offensive social media posts. Despite existing policies prohibiting racial harassment in the student handbook and district strategic plan, community members continued to call for more robust enforcement, clearer consequences, and comprehensive education about racial harassment.

In response to the 2023 incident and related concerns, Superintendent Jason Henderson stated that educational strategies to address racism were being developed, potentially including the formation of an Equity Task Force. These strategies included equity-focused training for staff and students, as well as updates to school policies to promote a more inclusive environment. District officials emphasized that these changes were part of ongoing efforts to address racial and gender-based discrimination in the school system.

The 2023 incident also resulted in increased police presence at Edwardsville High School, with law enforcement working to ensure safety and manage disruptions following community tensions. Reports noted that the school community experienced significant disruption, including heightened concerns about student safety.

Community dialogue and media coverage reflected the seriousness of the situation, with further calls for transparency and long-term commitments to addressing systemic discrimination. Videos shared by local outlets documented the school board's response and the growing pressure from the community to ensure meaningful change.

On May 23, 2023, former EHS assistant principal Erin Hamilton-Foley was arrested for sexual assault, a Class 1 felony. Hamilton-Foley was accused of having sexual relations with a 17-year-old student. The Edwardsville Community Unit School District 7 website listed Hamilton-Foley as the person in charge of the 11th grade students. On July 21, 2023, she effectively resigned from her position, the school board accepting it 3 days later.

Hamilton-Foley was originally charged with two counts of criminal sexual assault. Court filings detail two separate acts: one count alleged sexual penetration between her sex organ and the victim's sex organ; the second alleged sexual penetration between her mouth and the victim's sex organ. Hamilton-Foley initially pleaded not guilty on May 31, 2023. Bond in the case was set at $250,000, and Hamilton-Foley was released on May 25 after posting $25,000 cash bail, according to court records. As a condition of release, she was ordered to have no contact with the victim, stay at least 500 feet away, and not harass or intimidate him. On July 20, 2023, prosecutors filed a motion to compel Hamilton-Foley to provide the passcode to a new cellphone she obtained after her first phone was seized after finding out the 17-year-old contacted Hamilton-Foley multiple times after her arrest and sent her a video which police determined was child pornography under Illinois law.

On September 22, 2025, Hamilton-Foley pleaded guilty to one count of aggravated sexual assault from a plea agreement and was sentenced to four years in prison. She will also receive four years of mandatory supervised release once her prison sentence ends. Hamilton-Foley was also ordered to surrender her passport and her 2018 Chrysler Pacifica. Hamilton-Foley is also required to register as a sex offender. Her prison term will be served in the custody of the Illinois Department of Corrections.

In September 2025, The Edwardsville School Board suspended superintendent Patrick Shelton with pay following a pending investigation with a unanimous vote. Following this decision, assistant superintendent Allen Duncan is to fill the role as acting superintendent while the investigation continues. The district's spokesperson declined to comment on the reason for Shelton's suspension. Later, in January 2026, Shelton was terminated from his position as superintendent, with Duncan to fill the position as interim superintendent. As of May 13, 2026, Duncan has been appointed as District 7's permanent superintendent.

== Notable alumni ==
- Morris Bradshaw, NFL Oakland Raiders, New England Patriots, two-time Super Bowl winner Raiders, NFL executive for 29 years with Oakland Raiders
- Jason Boyd, former MLB player (Pittsburgh Pirates, Philadelphia Phillies, San Diego Padres, Cleveland Indians)
- Rodney Coe, former NFL player
- A. J. Epenesa, NFL defensive end (Buffalo Bills, Cleveland Browns)
- Justin Hampson, former MLB player (Colorado Rockies, San Diego Padres, New York Mets)
- Barb Honchak, professional Mixed Martial Artist, inaugural Invicta FC Flyweight Champion, currently competing in the UFC
- Bob Hoskins, former NFL player (San Francisco 49ers)
- Mannie Jackson, All-American college basketball guard for Illinois Fighting Illini from 1957 to 1960, 1st African-American owner of major sports corporation (Harlem Globetrotters), Naismith Basketball Hall of Fame Inductee, 2002
- Craig James, NFL player
- Mark Little, former MLB player (St. Louis Cardinals, Colorado Rockies, New York Mets, Arizona Diamondbacks, Cleveland Indians)
- Kate Martin, WNBA basketball player (Golden State Valkyries)
- Laurie Metcalf, Emmy Award-winning actress, known for roles on TV's Roseanne and the Toy Story movies
- Don Ohl, college basketball guard for Illinois Fighting Illini from 1955 to 1958, 5th round 1958 NBA draft pick by the Philadelphia Warriors, 5x NBA All-Star from 1963 to 1967
- Riley Patterson, NFL player
- Vincent Valentine (American football), current defensive lineman for the NFL's New England Patriots.
- Govoner Vaughn, All-American college basketball forward for Illinois Fighting Illini from 1957 to 1960
