= Connie Dierking =

American basketball player

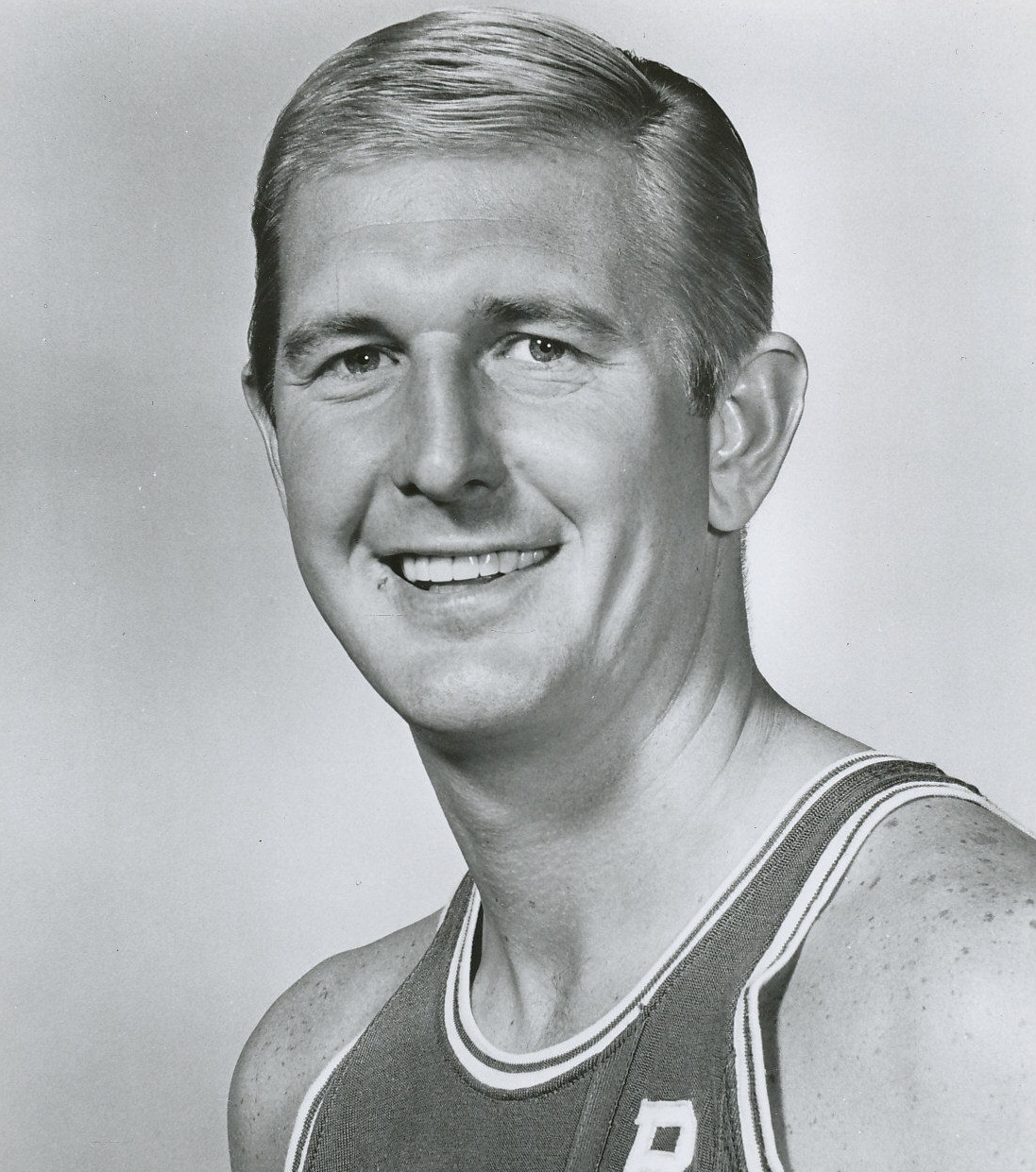
- Dierking in 1969

Personal information
- Born: October 2, 1936 Brooklyn, New York, U.S.
- Died: December 29, 2013 (aged 77) Cincinnati, Ohio, U.S.
- Listed height: 6 ft 9 in (2.06 m)
- Listed weight: 222 lb (101 kg)

Career information
- High school: Valley Stream Central (Valley Stream, New York)
- College: Cincinnati (1955–1958)
- NBA draft: 1958: 1st round, 5th overall pick
- Drafted by: Syracuse Nationals
- Playing career: 1958–1971
- Position: Center
- Number: 8, 29, 26, 9, 18, 24

Career history
- 1958–1960: Syracuse Nationals
- 1961: Philadelphia Tapers
- 1961–1962: Cleveland Pipers
- 1963–1965: Philadelphia 76ers
- 1965: San Francisco Warriors
- 1965–1970: Cincinnati Royals
- 1970–1971: Philadelphia 76ers

Career highlights
- Second-team All-American – NEA (1958); First-team All-MVC (1958)

Career NBA statistics
- Points: 7,094 (10.0 ppg)
- Rebounds: 4,757 (6.7 rpg)
- Assists: 1,053 (1.5 apg)
- Stats at NBA.com
- Stats at Basketball Reference

Conrad William Dierking (October 2, 1936 – December 29, 2013) was an American professional basketball player from 1958 to 1971.

== Early life ==
Connie Dierking was born in Brooklyn, New York and grew up on Long Island, where he starred in basketball for Central High School in Valley Stream, New York.

== University of Cincinnati ==
The 6'9" center then attended the University of Cincinnati, where he continued to excel, setting the Bearcats' single-season record of 18.8 rebounds per game, which still stands. He also set the Bearcats' single-game record of 33 rebounds. He led the team in scoring in 1956–57 with 18.5 points per game, and he averaged a double-double of 15.8 points and 14.9 rebounds per game in 1957–58, leading the Bearcats to the Missouri Valley Conference championship. Dierking's teammates included basketball hall-of-famer Oscar Robertson. Dierking was named second-team All-American by the Newspaper Enterprise Association. He was named to the University of Cincinnati's James P. Kelly Athletics Hall of Fame in 1986.

== NBA career ==
He was drafted in the first round of the 1958 NBA draft as the fifth overall pick by the Syracuse Nationals. He played two seasons for the Nationals, with per-game averages of 4.6 and 6.9 points and 3.6 and 6.4 rebounds, respectively.

Dierking left the NBA to play in the American Basketball League for the Philadelphia Tapers and the Cleveland Pipers before returning to the NBA for the 1963–64 season with the Philadelphia 76ers, for whom he averaged 6.5 points and 5.6 rebounds per game.

During the 1964–65 season, on January 15, 1965, he was part of an historic trade. He was one of three players (along with Paul Neumann and Lee Shaffer) traded by the 76ers to the San Francisco Warriors for basketball hall-of-famer Wilt Chamberlain. For the season, he averaged 7.9 points and 6.4 rebounds per game.

On October 20, 1965, he was traded by the Warriors along with Art Heyman to the Cincinnati Royals for Bud Olsen and cash. With the Royals, Dierking was reunited with his college teammate, Oscar Robertson.

Dierking had his most productive seasons during his five full seasons with the Royals as their starting center. His best season were the three from 1967–68 through 1969–70. In 1967–68, he played in 81 games and averaged 16.4 points and 9.5 rebounds, with career-high numbers of a .765 free throw shooting percentage and a field goal percentage of .467. In 1968–69, he played in all 82 games and averaged 16.3 points and 9.0 rebounds, and in 1969–70, he averaged a career-high 16.7 points along with 8.2 rebounds.

During the 1970–71 season, he played one game for the Royals and was traded along with Fred Foster to the 76ers for Darrall Imhoff and a future draft pick. He played 53 games for the 76ers in what would be his final season.

In his NBA career, Dierking averaged 10.0 points and 6.7 rebounds per game.

== Personal life ==
Connie Dierking died on December 29, 2013, at the age of 77. He is survived by his wife, Robyn (Thirlwell) Dierking; five daughters, Jane, Joey, Suzy, Wendy, and Cammy, a longtime news anchor for WKRC-TV; six grandchildren; and two brothers and two sisters. He was preceded in death by a grandchild.

== Career statistics ==
Legend
GP	Games played	GS	Games started	MPG	Minutes per game
FG%	Field goal percentage	3P%	3-point field goal percentage	FT%	Free throw percentage
RPG	Rebounds per game	APG	Assists per game	SPG	Steals per game
BPG	Blocks per game	PPG	Points per game	**Bold**	Career high

=== NBA ===
==== Regular season ====
Year	Team	GP	GS	MPG	FG%	FT%	RPG	APG	PPG
1958–59	Syracuse	64		11.3	.362	.593	3.6	.5	4.6
1959–60	Syracuse	71		15.8	.365	.574	6.4	.8	6.9
1963–64	Philadelphia	76		16.9	.372	.675	5.6	.7	6.5
1964–65	Philadelphia	38		19.2	.389	.651	6.3	1.1	7.8
1964–65	San Francisco	30		18.8	.427	.541	6.5	1.0	8.0
1965–66	Cincinnati	57		13.7	.416	.610	4.3	.8	5.6
1966–67	Cincinnati	77		24.7	.399	.744	7.8	2.1	9.3
1967–68	Cincinnati	81		**32.6**	**.467**	**.765**	**9.5**	2.4	16.4
1968–69	Cincinnati	**82**		31.0	.443	.762	9.0	**2.7**	16.3
1969–70	Cincinnati	76		32.2	.419	.752	8.2	2.2	**16.7**
1970–71	Cincinnati	1		23.0	.188	–	7.0	1.0	6.0
1970–71	Philadelphia	53	5	13.5	.399	.685	4.3	1.1	5.8
Career		706	5	21.9	.417	.697	6.7	1.5	10.0

==== Playoffs ====
Year	Team	GP	MPG	FG%	FT%	RPG	APG	PPG
1959	Syracuse	4	8.5	.167	.778	4.3	.5	2.8
1960	Syracuse	3	10.7	.300	.000	5.0	.3	4.0
1964	Philadelphia	**5**	14.2	.424	.556	6.0	1.0	6.6
1966	Cincinnati	4	16.0	**.500**	.900	3.8	.3	6.8
1967	Cincinnati	4	**37.8**	.427	**1.000**	**13.0**	**3.5**	**17.5**
Career		20	17.6	.399	.771	6.5	1.2	7.7
