= Paul Neumann (basketball) =

American basketball player (born 1938)

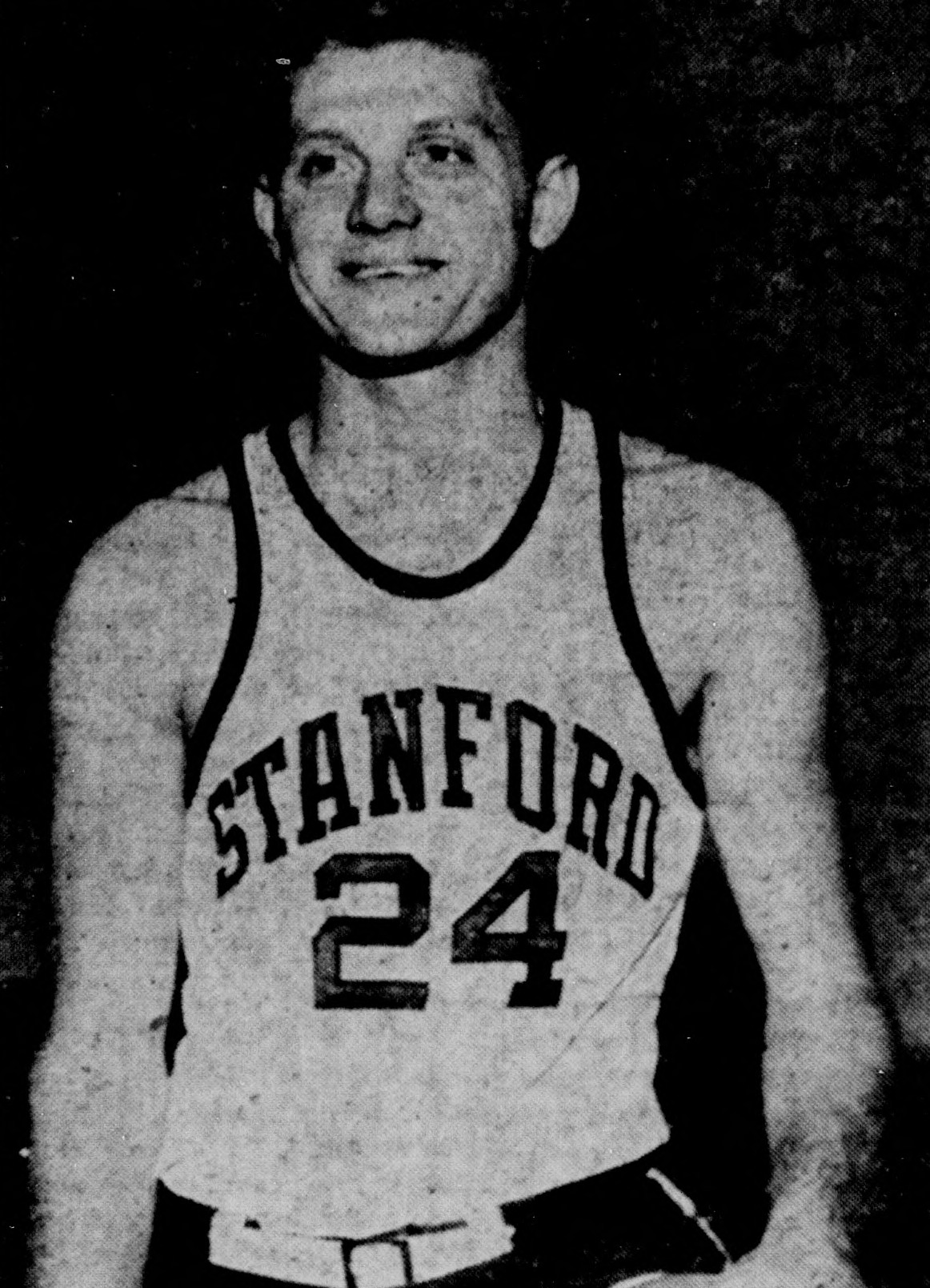
- Neumann, circa 1959

Personal information
- Born: January 30, 1938 (age 88)
- Listed height: 6 ft 1 in (1.85 m)
- Listed weight: 175 lb (79 kg)

Career information
- High school: Newport Harbor (Newport Beach, California)
- College: Stanford (1956–1959)
- NBA draft: 1959: 4th round, 27th overall pick
- Drafted by: Syracuse Nationals
- Playing career: 1961–1967
- Position: Point guard
- Number: 5, 15

Career history
- 1961: Washington Tapers
- 1961–1965: Syracuse Nationals / Philadelphia 76ers
- 1965–1967: San Francisco Warriors

Career highlights
- First-team All-PCC (1959); Second-team All-PCC (1958)

Career NBA statistics
- Points: 4,989 (11.0 ppg)
- Rebounds: 1,318 (2.9 rpg)
- Assists: 1,453 (3.2 apg)
- Stats at NBA.com
- Stats at Basketball Reference

Paul R. Neumann (born January 30, 1938) is an American former basketball player who played in the National Basketball Association (NBA).

A point guard, Neumann attended Newport Harbor High School in Newport Beach, California and played college basketball for the Stanford Cardinal.

He was selected in the fourth round of the 1959 NBA draft by the Syracuse Nationals. He played two seasons with the Nationals, and remained with the team as it moved to Philadelphia and was renamed the Philadelphia 76ers.

In 1965, he was traded at mid-season along with Connie Dierking and Lee Shaffer to the San Francisco Warriors for Wilt Chamberlain, a trade that is frequently cited as an example of a star player (in this case, Chamberlain) being traded for far less than he is worth.

He played two more full seasons with the Warriors before retiring in 1967.

== Career statistics ==
Legend
GP	Games played	GS	Games started	MPG	Minutes per game
FG%	Field goal percentage	3P%	3-point field goal percentage	FT%	Free throw percentage
RPG	Rebounds per game	APG	Assists per game	SPG	Steals per game
BPG	Blocks per game	PPG	Points per game	**Bold**	Career high

=== NBA ===
==== Regular season ====
Year	Team	GP	MPG	FG%	FT%	RPG	APG	PPG
1961–62	Syracuse	77	16.4	.429	.773	2.5	2.3	6.2
1962–63	Syracuse	**80***	19.8	.471	.815	2.5	2.8	8.2
1963–64	Philadelphia	74	26.7	.443	.789	3.3	3.9	11.6
1964–65	Philadelphia	40	27.5	**.491**	.804	2.6	3.5	**14.4**
1964–65	San Francisco	36	25.9	.450	.723	2.7	2.6	10.8
1965–66	San Francisco	66	26.2	.420	**.836**	3.2	2.8	**14.4**
1966–67	San Francisco	78	**31.0**	.424	.800	**3.5**	**4.4**	13.9
Career		451	24.4	.442	.799	2.9	3.2	11.1

==== Playoffs ====
Year	Team	GP	MPG	FG%	FT%	RPG	APG	PPG
1962	Syracuse	5	24.8	.414	.667	3.4	2.8	5.6
1963	Syracuse	4	16.3	.444	.000	**3.5**	2.3	4.0
1964	Philadelphia	5	**33.0**	**.458**	**.839**	2.6	**5.0**	**16.0**
1967	San Francisco	**15***	16.9	.330	.745	1.1	2.3	6.2
Career		29	21.0	.392	.765	2.1	2.8	7.5
