= Tom Hawkins (basketball) =

American basketball player (1936–2017)

Personal information
- Born: December 22, 1936 Winston-Salem, North Carolina, U.S.
- Died: August 16, 2017 (aged 80) Malibu, California, U.S.
- Listed height: 6 ft 5 in (1.96 m)
- Listed weight: 210 lb (95 kg)

Career information
- High school: Parker (Chicago, Illinois)
- College: Notre Dame (1956–1959)
- NBA draft: 1959: 1st round, 3rd overall pick
- Drafted by: Minneapolis Lakers
- Playing career: 1959–1969
- Position: Small forward
- Number: 20, 19, 33

Career history
- 1959–1962: Minneapolis / Los Angeles Lakers
- 1962–1966: Cincinnati Royals
- 1966–1969: Los Angeles Lakers

Career highlights
- Consensus second-team All-American (1959); Second-team All-American – UPI, NABC (1958); Third-team All-American – AP (1958)

Career NBA statistics
- Points: 6,672 (8.7 ppg)
- Rebounds: 4,607 (6.7 rpg)
- Assists: 871 (1.1 apg)
- Stats at NBA.com
- Stats at Basketball Reference

Thomas Jerome Hawkins (December 22, 1936 – August 16, 2017) was an American professional basketball player. He played ten seasons in the National Basketball Association (NBA) with the Minneapolis/Los Angeles Lakers and Cincinnati Royals, often in the role of sixth man. His teams reached the NBA playoffs every season of his career, and went to the NBA Finals three times. While still playing professional basketball, in 1966 he founded Athletes for a Better America, in Los Angeles.

Hawkins played collegiate basketball at the University of Notre Dame, where he led the team in scoring and rebounding three consecutive seasons, averaging a double-double each year (the first Notre Dame player to do so). He holds Notre Dame's record for most total career rebounds. He was a consensus second-team All-American in 1959, and a United Press second-team All-American and Associated Press third-team All-American in 1958. He was the first Black athlete at Notre Dame to be selected as an All-American. He played in two NCAA men's basketball tournaments, where he also averaged a double-double.

After retiring from professional basketball, Hawkins became a well-known sports reporter and television and radio host in Southern California, and later served as director of communications for the Los Angeles Dodgers in Major League Baseball from 1987 to 2004.

== Early life ==
Hawkins was born on December 22, 1936, in Winston-Salem, North Carolina and moved to Chicago as a child with his mother and aunt when he was six years old. It has also been reported that he was born in Chicago, but Hawkins himself said he was born in Winston-Salem and moved to Chicago. Hawkins attended Chicago's Parker (now Robeson) High School, and starred on its basketball team. Hawkins was one of 25 African American teens selected to integrate the school. During his time at Parker, he helped mediate racial conflicts between students.

In 1953, as a 6 ft 3 in (1.91 m) sophomore forward, the Chicago Tribune named Parker first-team All-City League among freshmen and sophomores. As a senior, the now 6 ft 5 in (1.96 m) Hawkins was Parker's team captain in 1954–55. Playing center in the January 1955 Illinois Tech Tournament, he scored 130 points in six games, and led the undersized Parker team to the tournament championship game. Hawkins was selected the most valuable player in that tournament. In 1955, he was a Chicago Tribune unanimous selection as first-team All-City League at forward. He was tied for the City League scoring title that year.

He also played on Parker's baseball team. He played second trumpet in Parker's concert band, and studied at the Chicago School of Music. Later in life he would host a jazz radio program, playing music from his large collection of vinyl records and compact discs.

== College career ==
Hawkins was recruited by a number of colleges, and received a scholarship offer from the University of Notre Dame, among others. He chose Notre Dame after visiting its campus, both for the pleasant layout of the campus, and because he felt a sense of belonging. He graduated in 1959 with a sociology degree.

=== Racial and social experience ===
At the time Hawkins entered Notre Dame in 1955, he was one of two Black students in the freshmen class, and one of ten Black students in the entire school. During his four years at Notre Dame, he was the only Black player on the basketball team and the only Black student in his classes. He felt extra pressure to do well in school because his success at Notre Dame was not just important to him personally, but he understood that how he performed in school socially and academically could have a broader effect on how Black people more generally were perceived. Hawkins' professors and schoolmates treated him with respect and were supportive, and he did not experience racial animus at the school from them. He enjoyed the academic aspects of school, once describing how specific Notre Dame professors made a positive impact upon him personally and intellectually. Almost 50 years later, he still said that he was never made to feel different by the people associated with Notre Dame during his four years there.

While Hawkins was a student, Notre Dame's president was Father Theodore M. Hesburgh, a civil rights advocate whom United States President Dwight D. Eisenhauer appointed to the original Civil Rights Commission in 1957. Hesburgh took the position that if any of Notre Dame's Black students suffered racial discrimination from any business, then Notre Dame and all of its students would refrain from doing any business with those entities. After a pizza restaurant in South Bend, Indiana, where Notre Dame is located, refused Hawkins service because he was Black, Hesburgh issued a directive that no Notre Dame students patronize the restaurant until the owner issued Hawkins a public apology. Several days later, Paul Hornung (a.k.a. "The Golden Boy"), Hawkins' schoolmate at Notre Dame and Heisman Trophy winner on Notre Dame's football team, came to Hawkins' dorm room and told Hawkins they were going to the restaurant to get the apology. The restaurant owner subsequently apologized to Hawkins.

Hawkins did experience racial discrimination at times while traveling to play other teams. In one instance, the Notre Dame team was in Lexington, Kentucky to participate in the 1958 NCAA tournament. When the team went to a movie theater, they were told that Hawkins would have to sit in the balcony, separate from his teammates. Led by teammate Ed Gleason, they all refused this arrangement, and instead went to the Black section of Lexington where they could be seated together.

=== Basketball ===
Hawkins became the school's first African-American basketball star, and was the first Black athlete at Notre Dame to become an All-American in any sport. He was a consensus second-team All-American in 1959. In 1958, he was named a second-team All-American by United Press and third-team All-American by the Associated Press (AP). Hawkins is Notre Dame's all-time career leading rebounder (1,318 rebounds). His 23 points per game is third all-time at Notre Dame, and his 1,820 career points is ninth all-time in total points scored for Notre Dame (through 2025–26).

Hawkins averaged over 20-points and over 15 rebounds per game in his three seasons with the Fighting Irish varsity, and was the first Notre Dame player to average a career double-double. As a sophomore (1956–57), he averaged 20.57 points and 17.3 rebounds per game, with a .431 field goal percentage. As a junior (1957–58), he averaged 25.2 points and 17.2 rebounds per game, with a .459 field goal percentage. As a senior (1958–59), he averaged 23.4 points and 15.2 rebounds per game, with a .405 field goal percentage. Hawkins was a team co-captain as a senior. He suffered a severe ankle sprain in an early January 1959 game against the North Carolina Tar Heels, and played in only 22 of Notre Dames' 25 games that season, after playing in 28 and 29 games the preceding two seasons. This was his only Notre Dame season that the team did not make the NCAA men's basketball tournament, finishing with a 12–13 record.

Hawkins led the team in scoring and rebounding three consecutive years (1956 to 1959). In February 1958 against the Air Force Academy, Hawkins set a Notre Dame single game record for field goals in a game (19), while tying the record for most points in a game (43); in March 1958 he set the school's single season record for total points; and in December 1958 (as a senior) he broke Notre Dame's all-time scoring record for total points (1,345) when he scored 39 points in a game against Bellarmine University.

Notre Dame had a 20–8 record in 1956–57, and played in the 1957 NCAA men's basketball tournament. Notre Dame defeated Miami (Ohio) University in the first round of the Mideast Regional, 89–77. Hawkins led Notre Dame with 25 points and 12 rebounds. They lost in the Mideast Regional semifinals to Michigan State, 85–83. Hawkins had 19 points and 11 rebounds. Notre Dame then defeated the Pitt Panthers 86–85, with Hawkins scoring 21 points and grabbing 14 rebounds. The Associated Press ranked Notre Dame 17th at the end of the season.

Notre Dame's record the next season was 24–5. They reached the Mideast Regional final game, losing to eventual national champion Kentucky, though the AP ranked Notre Dame No. 8 at the end of the year, one position above Kentucky. Hawkins had 15 points and 16 rebounds against Kentucky, but only one other player on Notre Dame scored more than seven points in the game. Earlier in the tournament, Hawkins had 31 points and 11 rebounds in a victory over the Indiana Hoosiers, and 30 points and 14 rebounds against Tennessee Tech.

In late March 1959, he played in a college All-Star basketball game, leading all scorers with 18 points.

In his six NCAA tournament games, Hawkins scored 141 points (23.5 points per game) and had 78 rebounds (13 rebounds per game). Over his three-year college career, Hawkins played in 79 games, averaging 23 points and 16.7 rebounds per game.

== Professional career ==
=== Minneapolis/Los Angeles Lakers (1959 to 1962) ===
Hawkins was selected by the Minneapolis (later Los Angeles) Lakers in the first round of the 1959 NBA draft, fourth overall. One of the three players selected before Hawkins was Wilt Chamberlain. As a rookie, he played in 69 games, averaging 21.3 minutes, 7.9 points and 6.2 rebounds per game. He was among 23 Lakers' personnel and family members aboard a team airplane returning late at night from a January 1960 game in St. Louis, when the electrical system went out during a heavy snowstorm. Despite the electrical failure and dark conditions, the pilot was able to land the plane safely in an Iowa cornfield covered with a foot of snow. Hawkins later said of the 5½ hour ordeal, "You're trying not to think of all the negative things that can happen . . . but there's no assurance that they won't. You're scared to death".

The Lakers moved to Los Angeles before the 1960–61 season. Hawkins averaged 23.7 minutes, 9.7 points and 6.1 rebounds per game over 78 games. He averaged 14.6 points per game against the Detroit Pistons in the 1961 NBA Western Division semifinals, and 10.7 points and 6.9 rebounds per game in the NBA Western Division finals against the St. Louis Hawks, playing 25.1 minutes per game. He played in 79 games the following season, starting some games at small forward after teammate Elgin Baylor was called to military service during the season. Hawkins averaged 24.1 minutes, 9.1 points and 6.5 rebounds per game. The Lakers reached the 1962 NBA Finals, losing to the Boston Celtics in seven games. Hawkins played in all seven games, averaging 10.6 minutes per game.

=== Cincinnati Royals ===
The Lakers traded Hawkins to the Cincinnati Royals for a future draft choice and first refusal rights on Hub Reed, before the start of the 1962–63 season. Hawkins became the Royal's sixth man during the majority of his time with the Royals, originally playing behind All-Star small forward Jack Twyman. After only a few months with Cincinnati, Royals head coach Charley Wolf stated that he considered Hawkins the NBA's best sixth man. He considered Hawkins a better sixth man than Dick Barnett or John Havlicek because he had a greater impact on the Royals than the other two players had on their teams. It was not until the 1965–66 season that Hawkins played more minutes per game than Twyman (with Jerry Lucas the only Royals' forward playing more minutes than Hawkins that season).

Hawkins played in 79 games in 1962–63, averaging nearly 22 minutes, 9.4 points and 6.9 rebounds per game. The Royals defeated the Syracuse Nationals in the NBA Eastern Division Semifinals, three games to two; Hawkins averaging 11.2 points, 5.6 rebounds and 3.2 assists per game in that series. The Royals lost to the Boston Celtics four games to three in the Eastern Conference finals, Hawkins averaging 10 points, 7.6 rebounds and 2.3 assists in 20.3 minutes per game. Over his next three seasons with the Royals (1963 to 1966), Hawkins averaged 24.2, 23.6 and 26.9 minutes per game; 8.6, 7.0, and 8.4 points per game; and 6.0, 7.3, and 5.7 rebounds per game, respectively. He played in 73 games in 1963–64, and 79 games in each of his final two seasons with the Royals. Over his four-year career in Cincinnati, he played in 31 playoff games, averaging nearly 24 minutes, 9.4 points, and 7.2 rebounds per game.

=== Los Angeles Lakers (1966 to 1969) ===
In mid-October 1966, the Royals traded Hawkins back to the Los Angeles Lakers for a 1967 draft pick and cash. In his first season back with the Lakers (1966–67), he averaged 23.7 minutes, 8.3 points, and 5.7 rebounds per game, once again playing behind Elgin Baylor at small forward. He was described as "playing the best basketball of his career" that season.

The following season (1967–68), Hawkins had career-highs in minutes per game (31.6) and points per game (11.6). Playing power forward and starting alongside Baylor, he also had 5.9 rebounds per game. Beyond statistical categories like scoring and rebounding, Lakers' coach Bill van Breda Kolff said during the season of Hawkins, "There are no statistics that show how many times he gets downcourt in a hurry to break up a fast break. And there are no records kept of the picks he's set to give our guards easy shots, or the way he clears out a zone to set up a one-on-one situation". van Breda Kolff considered the Lakers fortunate to have Hawkins on the team for his playing abilities, and because he was "a wonderful man to have on a team".

The Lakers defeated the Chicago Bulls in the 1968 NBA Western Division semifinals, four games to one. Hawkins averaged 29.2 minutes, seven points, and five rebounds per game in the series. In the Western Division finals, the Lakers won the series in four straight games over the San Francisco Warriors, Hawkins averaging 10.8 points and 6.3 rebounds per game. The Lakers lost the 1968 NBA Finals to the Boston Celtics in six games; Hawkins averaging 35 minutes, 10.7 points, and 6.7 rebounds per game.

In his final NBA season (1968–69), Hawkins once more played behind Baylor at small forward. He averaged 20.4 minutes, 7.1 points, and 3.6 rebounds per game. The Lakers and Celtics played in the NBA finals again, the Celtics winning in seven games. Hawkins averaged 16.1 minutes, 2.6 points, and 3.3 rebounds per game. After losing the series by two points in Game 7, a frustrated Hawkins observed that the 1968 Lakers team played well together as a team, but lacked the talent to beat the Celtics; and the 1969 Lakers team had the talent to beat the Celtics, but lacked cohesion. Less than two weeks later, Hawkins announced his retirement from the NBA in mid-May 1969. At the time he retired, Lakers' general manager Fred Schaus said "Tommy was a coach's ballplayer, a ballplayer's ballplayer . . . I don't think fans appreciated what he did because he never scored a lot of points".

During his career, Hawkins was known for his leaping ability and playing at full speed. In addition to his nicknames, "Hawk" and "the Hawk", he was sometimes called "Road Runner". Hawkins had a productive ten-year career in the league, playing for the Lakers and Royals as he registered 6,672 career points and 4,607 career rebounds. Over 764 games, he averaged 8.7 points, six rebounds, and 1.1 assists per game. His teams reached the playoffs every year of his career, and in 96 playoff games he averaged 21.9 minutes, eight points, 5.6 rebounds and 1.1 assists per game.

== Broadcasting and executive careers ==
Hawkins later worked in radio and television broadcasting in Los Angeles, including, among other employers, KNBC—TV and KABC in radio. He began as a television field reporter for KNBC in 1969. He later cohosted a midmorning television program on KHJ-TV with Stephanie Edwards. He spent 19 years as a local and national television, and radio, broadcaster. In the 2000s, he had a radio program on KKJZ where he played jazz music from his personal collection.

In 1987, Hawkins was hired by Peter O’Malley as vice president of communications and/or vice president of external affairs for the Los Angeles Dodgers baseball team, and worked in that position until 2004. In that role, he coordinated government relations with the Dodgers, handled speakers bureau engagements, and personally gave speeches (more than 100 in 2003 alone). Hawkins was originally hired after the turmoil surrounding racially insensitive comments made by team executive Al Campanis on national television in April 1987.

== Legacy and honors ==
In June 1966, Hawkins founded and was first executive director of Athletes for a Better America (ABA), in Los Angeles. Hawkins believed that youth would often listen to athletes even when people from other walks of life had no impact on them. Hawkins created the volunteer organization to provide free sports clinics to youth in low-income areas of Los Angeles, working with Los Angeles' Department of Parks and Recreation; believing that showing care for the lives of economically disadvantaged young people could have a significant impact on their lives. In publicly announcing the founding of this new organization on June 14, 1966, Hawkins was accompanied by Elgin Baylor and Jerry West of the Los Angeles Lakers, Jack Snow and Lamar Lundy of the Los Angeles Rams and former Ram Woodley Lewis, Heisman Trophy winner Mike Garrett, and Tommy Davis of the Los Angeles Dodgers. The ABA's original board of directors included, among others, Hawkins, West, Davis, Rosey Grier, and Deacon Dan Towler. The Los Angeles Times later described ABA as being founded "in the wake of the Watts riots". By December 1967, Hawkins estimated that 5,000 children of all racial backgrounds had attended ABA sports clinics.

During his NBA career, he was a player representative, and "had a key role in establishing the first collective bargaining agreement with the players' union and the NBA". Hawkins and Naismith Basketball Hall of Fame head coach John Wooden were friends, and Hawkins became closely associated with the John R. Wooden Award, given annually to the top male and female college basketball players. Hawkins acted as its master of ceremonies for 30 years, and served as its chair from 2010 to 2017.

Toward the end of Hawkins' senior year at Notre Dame, head coach Johnny Jordan said Hawkins was "as good as any basketball player Notre Dame has ever had". Naismith Basketball Hall of Fame forward Elgin Baylor, who played with Hawkins in Minneapolis and Los Angeles said Hawkins "was a competitor – played hard, worked hard". Former Los Angeles Dodgers' general manager Fred Claire said Hawkins was "one of the most respected people I have had the honor to know". Peter O'Malley said Hawkins "did an extraordinary job" for the Dodgers.

In 1973, he was among the inaugural class of 172 persons inducted into the Illinois Basketball Coaches Hall of Fame, in the players category. In 2004, he was named to Notre Dame’s All-Century Team. He was inducted into Notre Dame's Purcell Pavillion Ring of Honor in 2015. In 2016, he was inducted into the Southern California Sports Broadcasters Hall of Fame.

== Personal life and death ==
Hawkins and his first wife Dori had four children, including a son Kevin who also attended Notre Dame, and made the basketball team as a walk-on from 1979 to 1981. Hawkins sought not to have his life defined as only being an ex-basketball player. He had a wide range of experiences, interests, and friendships; Hawkins referring to himself as a "cosmic functionary". In 1959, he attended a book signing by Jackie Robinson in Minnesota, and sat by Robinson's side during the event. Later in life, Duke Ellington invited Hawkins to his home for a meal, and Janis Joplin invited him to see her in concert.

In addition to his playing, media, public service, and baseball executive careers, among other things he taught a class on media and the Black athlete at California State University, Long Beach, was involved in California political and ballot campaigns as an advertising executive, served as chair of the Youth Activities Division of the Greater Los Angeles Urban Coalition, and was a representative for the President's Council on Physical Fitness and Sports. In 2011, he published a book of poetry, Life's Reflections: Poetry for the People. The book included 45 poems written over decades, and paintings by LeRoy Neiman and Ernie Barnes, among others.

Hawkins died in his home in Malibu, California on August 16, 2017, where he and his second wife Layla had lived for 32 years. Layla and her family had left Iran in 1979 as a result of the Iranian Revolution, and came to the United States. Hawkins was survived by Dori and their four children, and Layla and their daughter. In 2025, their home and all of Hawkins remaining possessions were destroyed in the Palisades Fire, and Layla Hawkins, her daughter, and three year old granddaughter were all displaced.

== Career statistics ==
Legend
| GP | Games played | GS | Games started | MPG | Minutes per game |
| FG% | Field goal percentage | 3P% | 3-point field goal percentage | FT% | Free throw percentage |
| RPG | Rebounds per game | APG | Assists per game | SPG | Steals per game |
| BPG | Blocks per game | PPG | Points per game | **Bold** | Career high |
| * | Led the league |

=== NBA ===
==== Regular season ====
| Year | Team | GP | MPG | FG% | FT% | RPG | APG | PPG |
|---|---|---|---|---|---|---|---|---|
| 1959–60 | Minneapolis | 69 | 21.3 | .380 | **.646** | 6.2 | .8 | 7.9 |
| 1960–61 | L.A. Lakers | 78 | 23.7 | .431 | .596 | 6.1 | 1.1 | 9.7 |
| 1961–62 | L.A. Lakers | **79** | 24.1 | .411 | .644 | 6.5 | 1.2 | 9.1 |
| 1962–63 | Cincinnati | **79** | 21.8 | .471 | .610 | 6.9 | 1.3 | 9.4 |
| 1963–64 | Cincinnati | 73 | 24.2 | .441 | .601 | 6.0 | 1.0 | 8.6 |
| 1964–65 | Cincinnati | **79** | 23.6 | .409 | .569 | 6.0 | 1.0 | 7.0 |
| 1965–66 | Cincinnati | **79** | 26.9 | .452 | .555 | **7.3** | 1.3 | 8.4 |
| 1966–67 | L.A. Lakers | 76 | 23.7 | .481 | .474 | 5.7 | 1.1 | 8.3 |
| 1967–68 | L.A. Lakers | 78 | **31.6** | **.499** | .546 | 5.9 | **1.5** | **11.6** |
| 1968–69 | L.A. Lakers | 74 | 20.4 | **.499** | .411 | 3.6 | 1.1 | 7.1 |
| Career | | 764 | 24.2 | .447 | .570 | 6.0 | 1.1 | 8.7 |

==== Playoffs ====
| Year | Team | GP | MPG | FG% | FT% | RPG | APG | PPG |
|---|---|---|---|---|---|---|---|---|
| 1960 | Minneapolis | 8 | 14.9 | .489 | **.833** | 2.6 | .4 | 7.4 |
| 1961 | L.A. Lakers | 12* | 23.6 | .466 | .660 | 6.3 | 1.1 | **11.6** |
| 1962 | L.A. Lakers | 13 | 15.6 | .361 | .417 | 5.1 | 1.5 | 4.2 |
| 1963 | Cincinnati | 12 | 22.0 | .505 | .723 | 6.8 | 1.9 | 10.5 |
| 1964 | Cincinnati | 10 | 27.3 | .443 | .682 | **9.3** | 1.1 | 10.1 |
| 1965 | Cincinnati | 4 | 23.8 | **.515** | .800 | 7.0 | .3 | 9.5 |
| 1966 | Cincinnati | 5 | 21.8 | .458 | .167 | 4.4 | .2 | 4.6 |
| 1967 | L.A. Lakers | 3 | 31.7 | .419 | .500 | 6.7 | **3.3** | 10.0 |
| 1968 | Los Angeles | **15** | **31.9** | .457 | .600 | 6.0 | 1.2 | 9.5 |
| 1969 | L.A. Lakers | 14 | 12.9 | .480 | .389 | 2.9 | .5 | 3.9 |
| Career | | 96 | 21.9 | .459 | .617 | 5.6 | 1.1 | 8.0 |
