= Wayne Embry =

American basketball player and team executive (born 1937)

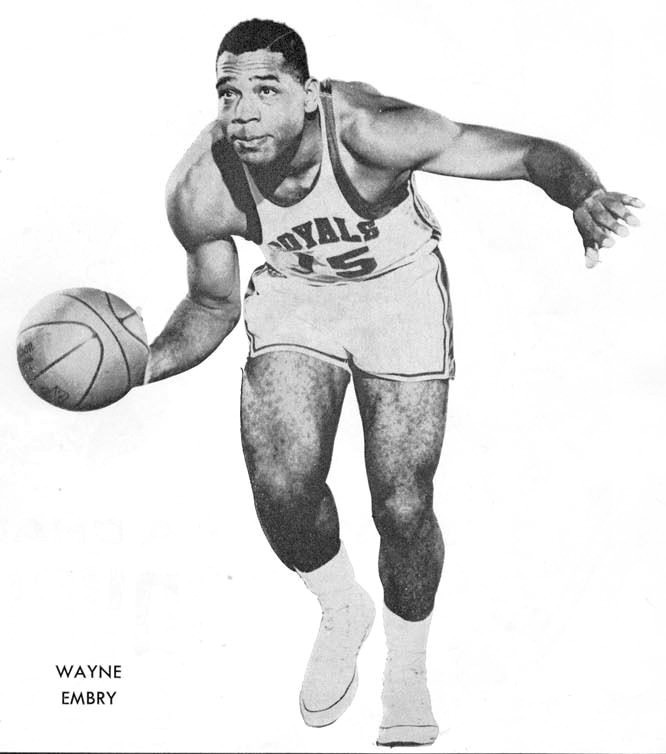
- Embry in the 1964–1965 Cincinnati Royals program

Personal information
- Born: March 26, 1937 (age 89) Springfield, Ohio, U.S.
- Listed height: 6 ft 8 in (2.03 m)
- Listed weight: 240 lb (109 kg)

Career information
- High school: Tecumseh (New Carlisle, Ohio)
- College: Miami (Ohio) (1955–1958)
- NBA draft: 1958: 3rd round, 22nd overall pick
- Drafted by: St. Louis Hawks
- Playing career: 1958–1969
- Position: Center
- Number: 34, 32, 15, 28

Career history
- 1958–1966: Cincinnati Royals
- 1966–1968: Boston Celtics
- 1968–1969: Milwaukee Bucks

Career highlights
- NBA champion (1968); 5× NBA All-Star (1961–1965); 2× First-team All-MAC (1957, 1958); No. 23 retired by Miami RedHawks; As executive: 2× NBA Executive of the Year (1992, 1998); NBA champion (2019)

Career statistics
- Points: 10,380 (12.5 ppg)
- Rebounds: 7,544 (9.1 rpg)
- Assists: 1,194 (1.4 apg)
- Stats at NBA.com
- Stats at Basketball Reference
- Basketball Hall of Fame
- Collegiate Basketball Hall of Fame

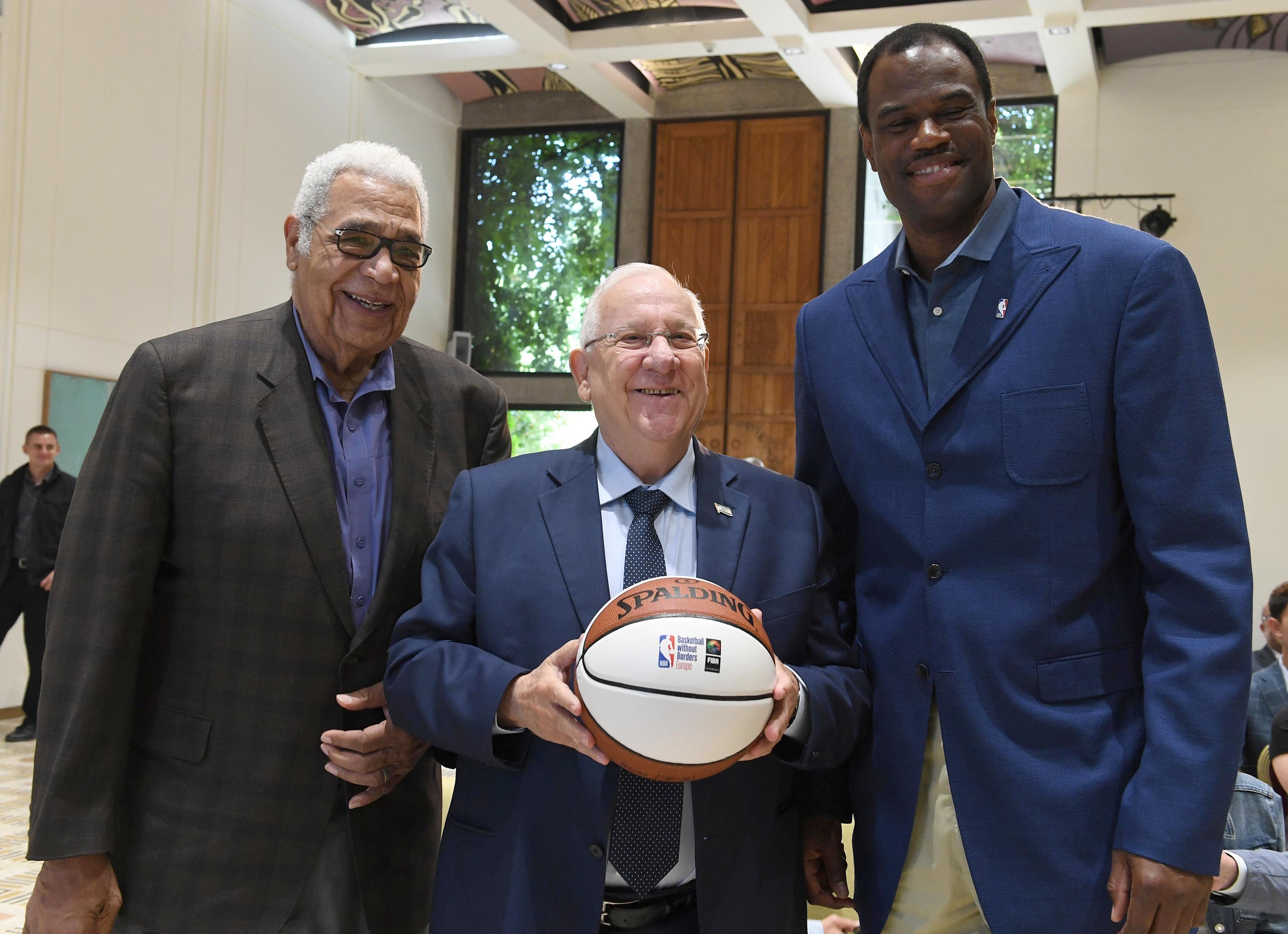
Wayne Embry (left) and David Robinson (right) meeting with Reuven Rivlin, president of Israel, at Beit HaNassi, August 2017

Wayne Richard Embry (born March 26, 1937) is an American former professional basketball player and basketball executive. Embry's 11-year playing career as a center spanned from 1958 to 1969 playing for the Cincinnati Royals, Boston Celtics and Milwaukee Bucks, all of the National Basketball Association (NBA). After his playing career, Embry transitioned to a career as a professional basketball executive, becoming the first African American general manager and team president in NBA history. In 1999, he was inducted into the Naismith Memorial Basketball Hall of Fame.

Since 2004, Embry has served as a senior basketball advisor for the Toronto Raptors.

== Early life ==
Embry was born on March 26, 1937, in Springfield Ohio. He was raised on a family farm five miles outside of Springfield, on a 70-acre property with four separate homes for his nuclear family, his grandparents, and two uncles. The family was poor and his father also had to work as a car mechanic. He attended Tecumseh High School near New Carlisle, Ohio, where he was a three-year letter winner and earned honorable mention All-State honors as a basketball payer. He was already 6 ft 4 in (1.93 m) as a 15-year old junior center. In his senior year (1954), Tecumseh was undefeated in the regular season, and their only loss came in the regional tournament finals.

In his first year at Tecumseh, Embry was the only African-American student in the school. He suffered racial epithets at the school and wanted to leave, but his parents told him he had to stick it out by believing in himself as a man or no one else would believe in him, a philosophy he followed the rest of his life.

== College career ==
Embry was recruited to Miami University in Oxford, Ohio, by coach Bill Rohr, who won Embry over by emphasizing academics rather than basketball as the primary reason to attend Miami. Embry became a member of Alpha Phi Alpha fraternity. He was nicknamed "Goose" by his basketball teammates.

As a two-time All-Mid-American Conference center, Embry, a team captain, led the then-Redskins to conference championships and NCAA Tournament appearances in 1957 and 1958. He led the MAC in scoring and rebounding in those two seasons, averaging 23.1 and 24.9 points, and 17.2 and 18.1 rebounds per game as a junior and senior, respectively.

Embry still holds several school records, including best career rebounding average (15.5) (through the 2024–25 season). He ranks among Miami leaders in the all-time scoring list with 1,401 points (just outside the top-10) and is second on the total rebounding list with 1,117 (two behind Ron Harper's 1,119). He holds both Miami and MAC records for most rebounds in a game with 34 (in a game where he also scored 39 points and hit the winning shot in a one-point overtime victory), and season (488). He was one of only 14 players in MAC history to total more than 1,000 career points and rebounds, and was the first Miami player to reach both of those numbers in a career.

He was selected to the Helms Athletic Foundation All-America third team as a senior, and he was a two-time honorable mention All-America selection in 1957 and 1958.

He was inducted in the second class of the Miami Athletics Hall of Fame in 1970. He became the fourth player in Miami history to have his jersey (23) retired.

Embry earned a Bachelor of Science in education from Miami.

== NBA playing career ==
Embry was originally drafted by the St. Louis Hawks in the third round of the April 1958 NBA draft (23rd overall).

=== Cincinnati Royals ===
In early August 1958, before ever playing for the Hawks, he was traded closer to home to the Cincinnati Royals. The Royals were rebuilding due to the loss of team star forward Maurice Stokes and their inability to sign star center Clyde Lovellette. Stokes became paralyzed with encephalitis in mid-March 1958, after hitting his head and falling unconscious three days earlier during the final game of the regular season against the Minneapolis Lakers. Stokes was still paralyzed at the time of the trade, and remained so for the rest of his shortened life.

Lovellette and the Royals were also at loggerheads over his contract, as Lovellette wanted a sizable pay increase after an excellent 1957–58 season and the Royals were unwilling to meet his demands. Lovellette was traded to St. Louis for Embry and four other rookies: Gerry Calvert, Darrell Floyd, Jim Palmer and Ken Sidle. Embry became the only African American on the Royals' roster.

As a Royals' rookie, Embry averaged 11.4 points and nine rebounds in only 24.1 minutes per game. However, the Royals record fell from 33 to 39 in 1957–58 to 19–53 in his rookie year. The following season his rebounding average increased to 9.5 per game, even though his playing time was less than 22 minutes per game (while also scoring 10.6 points per game). The Royals again played poorly, however, and finished 19–56.

Future Hall of fame guard Oscar Robertson Joined the Royals in 1960, helping the team improve to a 33–46 record. Embry's production increased following Robertson's arrival, earning his first Western Division All-Star selection as a backup center behind starter Clyde Lovellette. On the season, Embry averaged 14.4 points and 10.9 rebounds in 28.3 minutes per game. Offensively, he was notable for running the pick and roll with Robertson and providing a strong physical presence on the court. At 6 ft 8 in (2.03 m). and 240 pounds (109 kg), Embry earned the nickname "The Wall" due to his sturdy build and the effectiveness of his screens.

Embry (1960–63), Robertson (1960–63) and Jack Twyman (1961–63) were all NBA All-Stars for Cincinnati during the next three years. The Royals' record improved to 43–37 (1961–62) and 42–38 (1962–63). In 1963, he was selected team captain of the Royals. The 1962-63 Royals won the Eastern division semifinals over the Syracuse Nationals, before losing the Eastern division finals to the Boston Celtics in a seven-game series. Overall during the 1963 NBA Playoffs, Embry averaged postseason career highs of 16.8 points and 13.5 rebounds per game. He averaged 12.7 rebounds and 16 points per game in the Boston series, facing Celtics Hall of Fame center Bill Russell.

The next season, the 1963–64 Cincinnati Royals surged to the second-best record in the NBA (55–25), with future Hall of Fame teammate Jerry Lucas now added, and Robertson named the league's Most Valuable Player. That season, on December 1, Embry totaled a career high 39 points scored in a 114–109 loss to the Los Angeles Lakers. Embry was selected an All-Star for the fourth consecutive year (joining Lucas and Robertson on the All-Star Team), and was 9th in most valuable player voting. He averaged 17.3 points and 11.6 rebounds in 36.4 minutes per game.

Embry was selected to the All-Star Team again in 1964-65 for the fifth consecutive season, though his regular season averages (10 rebounds and 12.7 points per game) were the lowest since his second season with the Royals. In Embry's final season with the Royals (1965–66), his playing time was reduced to less than 24 minutes a game, and he had career-lows in rebounding and scoring averages. Earlier in the season he had been averaging around 30 minutes per game, but coach Jack McMahon cut that in half later in the season. An unhappy Embry decided to retire.

During Embry's years with the Royals, the team was never able to surpass the Eastern Division's Boston Celtics of Red Auerbach and Bill Russell, or the Philadelphia 76ers with Wilt Chamberlain, to reach the NBA finals in their quest for an NBA title; losing to the Celtics again in the 1964 Eastern Division Finals, the 76ers in the 1965 Eastern Division Semifinals, and the Celtics in the 1966 Eastern Division Semifinals, in Embry's last games as a Royal.

=== Boston Celtics and Milwaukee Bucks ===
Nearly retiring to be a regional sales leader for Pepsi-Cola, Embry was talked out of retirement by friend Bill Russell, the new player/coach for Boston. While Embry would not accept playing in a back up role and tutor to incoming center Walt Wesley at Cincinnati, playing as a backup for Bill Russell and the Boston Celtics was agreeable to him. Less than two weeks after retiring from the Royals, the Celtics and Auerbach sought permission from the Royals general manager Pepper Wilson to try and sign Embry, and successfully did so. Pepsi also agreed that Embry's work for the company could continue in Boston. It is also reported that Red Auerbach talked Embry out of retirement.

In his first season with the Celtics (1966–67), Embry averaged 10.1 minutes per game as Russell's backup, but played sparingly in the playoffs that year; the Celtics losing four games to one against the 76ers in the Eastern Division Finals. During the season, Auerbach constantly encouraged Embry for his game performances, and instilled confidence in Embry. The following season (1967–68), the Celtics finished eight games behind the 76ers in the Eastern conference, but went on to win the Eastern Division Finals over the 76ers and the NBA finals over the Los Angeles Lakers, capturing the NBA championship.

Embry played crucial reserve minutes for Russell and aided that team's surprising 1967–68 NBA title run. Embry averaged nearly 14 minutes a game as Russell's backup center during the regular season, with 6.3 point and 4.1 rebound per game averages. He averaged over 11 minutes per game in the playoff series against the 76ers, playing as Russell's backup in all seven games. With the 76ers up three games to one over the Celtics going into Game 5 of the Eastern Division Finals, Embry's strong second-half defense against Chamberlain was critical to the Celtics winning that game; with the Celtics ultimately winning the series in seven games. He played in five of the six NBA Finals games against the Lakers, averaging nearly 10 minutes per game.

That offseason, when the Milwaukee Bucks were formed, they claimed an unprotected Embry from the Celtics in the May 1968 expansion draft. He was named the Bucks first captain. Embry started at center for the Bucks for the 1968–69 season, averaging 13.1 points and 8.6 rebounds in 30.2 minutes per game. In the first game in Bucks franchise history, Embry scored 15 points and grabbed 20 rebounds. Embry retired at the end of the season, at age 32. Over his 11-year career, Embry averaged 9.1 rebounds and 12.5 points per game.

== NBA career statistics ==
Legend
GP	Games played	GS	Games started	MPG	Minutes per game
FG%	Field goal percentage	3P%	3-point field goal percentage	FT%	Free throw percentage
RPG	Rebounds per game	APG	Assists per game	SPG	Steals per game
BPG	Blocks per game	PPG	Points per game	**Bold**	Career high
†	Won an NBA championship	*	Led the league

=== Regular season ===
Year	Team	GP	GS	MPG	FG%	3P%	FT%	RPG	APG	SPG	BPG	PPG
1958–59	Cincinnati	66	-	24.1	.387	-	.656	9.0	1.5	-	-	11.4
1959–60	Cincinnati	73	-	21.8	.439	-	.514	9.5	1.1	-	-	10.6
1960–61	Cincinnati	79*	-	28.3	.451	-	.668	10.9	1.6	-	-	14.4
1961–62	Cincinnati	75	-	35.0	**.466**	-	**.690**	**13.0**	**2.4**	-	-	**19.8**
1962–63	Cincinnati	76	-	33.0	.458	-	.667	12.3	2.3	-	-	18.6
1963–64	Cincinnati	**80**	-	**36.4**	.458	-	.650	11.6	1.4	-	-	17.3
1964–65	Cincinnati	74	-	30.3	.456	-	.644	10.0	1.2	-	-	12.7
1965–66	Cincinnati	**80***	-	23.5	.411	-	.603	6.6	1.0	-	-	7.6
1966–67	Boston	72	-	10.1	.409	-	.569	4.1	0.6	-	-	5.2
1967–68†	Boston	78	-	13.9	.400	-	.589	4.1	0.7	-	-	6.3
1968–69	Milwaukee	78	-	30.2	.427	-	.664	8.6	1.9	-	-	13.1
Career		831	-	26.2	.440	-	.640	9.1	1.4	-	-	12.5

=== Playoffs ===
Year	Team	GP	GS	MPG	FG%	3P%	FT%	RPG	APG	SPG	BPG	PPG
1961–62	Cincinnati	4	-	32.0	**.467**	-	.778	11.3	2.0	-	-	14.0
1962–63	Cincinnati	12	-	32.8	.450	-	.662	**13.5**	1.3	-	-	**16.8**
1963–64	Cincinnati	10	-	**36.3**	.381	-	.622	12.4	**2.1**	-	-	13.4
1964–65	Cincinnati	4	-	30.8	.438	-	**.818**	6.3	2.0	-	-	12.8
1965–66	Cincinnati	5	-	27.8	.421	-	.583	6.8	0.4	-	-	7.8
1966–67	Boston	5	-	7.6	.387	-	.500	2.6	0.6	-	-	5.2
1967–68†	Boston	**16**	-	10.1	.390	-	.448	2.8	0.4	-	-	3.7
Career		56	-	24.1	.418	-	.645	8.0	1.1	-	-	10.1

== NBA front-office career ==
In 1970, Embry left his job in Boston's department of recreation and joined the Bucks front office as director of player personnel, under team president Ray Patterson. He served as Patterson's administrative assistant, originally working as chief scout and then becoming more involved with everyday team operations over time, learning management from Patterson (as he had previously learned from Red Auerbach). Embry kept an eye for former Royals teammates he could lure to the rising contender.

Embry was instrumental in numerous signings to aid the team, including his former teammate and roommate Oscar Robertson (traded to the Bucks in 1970) and scout John Killilea. The Bucks also traded for Embry's old Royals' teammate Bob Boozer in September 1970, who played over 22 minutes per game for the Bucks during his final NBA season, adding potent depth to the Bucks' team. The addition of Robertson to a team that already included then-named future Hall of Fame center Lew Alcindor (now Kareem Abdul-Jabbar) quickly produced an NBA title in 1971.

In 1972, when Patterson decided to leave the Bucks to take over the Houston Rockets, Embry was unanimously selected as general manager by the Bucks' board. This made Embry the first African American NBA general manager, and the first African American general manager in any major U.S. sport. He served as general manager for the Bucks (1972–1976), and then as a Bucks' vice president and consultant for the next eight years.

As general manager in 1975, Embry had to address Abdul-Jabbar's demand to be traded, though the Bucks did not want to trade him. Embry traded Abdul-Jabbar and Walt Wesley to the Los Angeles Lakers for Elmore Smith, Dave Meyers, Brian Winters, and Junior Bridgeman. He resigned as general manager early in the 1976–77 season, along with coach Larry Costello, having fallen out of favor with team president James Fitzgerald. In 1985, the Indiana Pacers hired Embry as a vice president and consultant, where he was instrumental in the 1986 draft. In June 1986, Embry was hired as vice president and general manager (1986–1999) of the Cleveland Cavaliers. In his first season, Embry hired future Hall of fame player and coach Lenny Wilkens as head coach. Embry became an executive vice president in 1992, and in 1994 was promoted by the Cavaliers to executive operating officer and team president (1994–2000), while still its general manager, the first African American to become an NBA team president. Embry stepped aside as general manager in June 1999 (for Jim Paxson). He remained general manager for the WNBA's Cleveland Rockers.

In 2004, he was named senior assistant to the general manager of the Toronto Raptors (Rob Babcock), and became the team's interim general manager in 2006. Babcock was a rookie general manager when Embry was hired in 2004 to be Babcock's senior advisor. In April 2005, Embry was named senior advisor to the team's president, Richard Peddie, bypassing Babcock in the chain of command. In mid-January 2006, Peddie went to Embry as his senior advisor with concerns over Babcock's performance as general manager. Soon after, Peddie went to the Raptors' board with his concerns over Babcock and then announced Babcock's firing on January 26, 2006.

On January 26, 2006, Raptor team president and CEO Peddie named Embry the interim general manager for the Raptors after the firing of Babcock, a position Embry held for less than two months until Bryan Colangelo was hired as the new president and general manager. Still, during his short stint as general manager, Embry engineered two significant trades. Embry has continued to serve as senior basketball advisor for the Raptors (through at least 2024). Since joining the team, the Raptors went on to become NBA champions in 2019.

== Legacy and honors ==
Embry has been a trustee of the Naismith Memorial Basketball Hall of Fame since 1974 and has served on various senior-level committees for the NBA and USA Basketball. In recognition of his career both on the court and in the front office, he was inducted into the Naismith Hall of Fame as a contributor to the sport in 1999. He also served as a member of Miami's board of trustees for 14 years, including one year as chair.

Embry was selected The Sporting News' NBA Executive of the Year in 1992 and 1997, and Sports Illustrated Executive of the Year in 1998.

Embry was inducted into the Ohio Basketball Hall of Fame in 2006 as a member of the charter class. He was the 2013 recipient of the Ohio Heritage Award, recognizing an Ohio Basketball Hall of Fame inductee for his or her contributions to the state of Ohio off the court.

On May 18, 2021, Miami University unveiled a statue which stands at the south entrance of Millett Hall, the university's basketball arena. It captures Embry's likeness and signature hook shot. Private donations funded the creation of the statue and a Wayne Embry Scholarship, which will support Miami varsity men's basketball student-athletes. The university also presented Embry and his late wife, Theresa “Terri” Embry (Miami ’60), with the Freedom Summer of ’64 Award, which is bestowed each year upon a distinguished leader who has inspired the nation to advance civil rights and social justice.

He has received the Sports Business Journal's Champions Award, the Global Sports Management Summit's Lifetime Achievement Award and the Giant Steps Award from the National Consortium for Academics and Sports.

Both his high school and college uniform numbers have been retired.

A portion of U. S. Route 40 in front of Tecumseh High School near Springfield, Ohio was named in Wayne Embry's honor.

== Personal life ==
Embry and his wife Theresa (Terri) met in college, and have two daughters and one son. He also has a granddaughter. Terri obtained a bachelor's degree in education, and participated in civil rights marches led by Dr. Martin Luther King Jr. Later in life she served on boards at the University of Miami and the Urban League. She died on August 27, 2020, at age 82. Embry is distantly related to Marty Embry, another professional basketball player.

Upon retiring as an NBA player, Embry was named recreation director for the city of Boston.

He has been a founder and CEO of his own businesses, and member of numerous nonprofit and corporate boards of directors, including Kohl's, Federal Reserve Bank of Cleveland, Centerior Energy and Ohio Casualty Insurance.

He is the author of an autobiography The Inside Game: Race, Power and Politics in the NBA (University of Akron Press, 2004), with Mary Schmitt Boyer of the Cleveland Plain Dealer and a foreword by Spike Lee. The book created controversy as to whether Don Nelson had questioned the ability of blacks to coach in the NBA, which Embry had asserted in the book and which Nelson denied saying.
