= 1963–64 Cincinnati Royals season =

NBA professional basketball team season

- Head coach: Jack McMahon
- Owners: Louis Jacobs
- Arena: Cincinnati Gardens

Results
- Record: 55–25 (.688)
- Place: Division: 2nd (Eastern)
- Playoff finish: Division finals (lost to Celtics 1–4)
- Stats at Basketball Reference

Local media
- Television: WKRC-TV
- Radio: WLW

The 1963–64 Cincinnati Royals season was the Royals 16th season in the NBA and its seventh in Cincinnati.

The team's outstanding roster included Oscar Robertson, Jerry Lucas, Team Captain Wayne Embry, Jack Twyman, Arlen Bockhorn, Bob Boozer, Tom Hawkins, Adrian Smith, Bud Olsen, Larry Staverman and coach Jack McMahon. The team is noteworthy for having both the NBA MVP in Robertson and the NBA Rookie of the Year in Lucas, a rare occurrence in NBA history. The team played most of their home games at Cincinnati Gardens arena, but also hosted home games that season in Dayton, Lima, Columbus at Saint John arena and Cleveland at Cleveland Arena.

Between January and February, the Royals also logged a 12-game winning streak, their longest during the franchise's Cincinnati era. The Royals finished in 2nd place with a 55–25 record, the second best record in the NBA. In the playoffs, the Royals defeated the Philadelphia 76ers in a 5-game series, but lost both Lucas and Olsen to injury. In the Eastern Conference Final, the Royals were eliminated by the Boston Celtics, who triumphed in 5 games.

== Draft picks ==
Tom Thacker from the outstanding University of Cincinnati program was another territorial draft pick, the team's first this year. Shooter Jimmy Rayl was the team's second-round selection. He was cut, but later played in the ABA.

== Roster ==
1963–64 Cincinnati Royals roster
Players

Pos.	No.	Player	Height	Weight	DOB	From
G	21	Jay Arnette	6 ft 2 in (1.88 m)	175 lb (79 kg)		Texas
G	11	Arlen Bockhorn	6 ft 4 in (1.93 m)	200 lb (91 kg)		Dayton
C	15	Wayne Embry	6 ft 8 in (2.03 m)	240 lb (109 kg)		Miami (OH)
F	20	Tom Hawkins	6 ft 5 in (1.96 m)	210 lb (95 kg)		Notre Dame
F/C	16	Jerry Lucas	6 ft 8 in (2.03 m)	230 lb (104 kg)		Ohio State
F	34	Bud Olsen	6 ft 8 in (2.03 m)	220 lb (100 kg)		Louisville
PG	14	Oscar Robertson	6 ft 5 in (1.96 m)	205 lb (93 kg)		Cincinnati
G	10	Adrian Smith	6 ft 1 in (1.85 m)	180 lb (82 kg)		Kentucky
F	13	Larry Staverman	6 ft 7 in (2.01 m)	205 lb (93 kg)		Thomas More
G	25	Tom Thacker	6 ft 2 in (1.88 m)	170 lb (77 kg)		Cincinnati
F	27	Jack Twyman	6 ft 6 in (1.98 m)	210 lb (95 kg)		Cincinnati

Coaches
Head coach
- Jack McMahon

Legend
- (DP) Unsigned draft pick
- (FA) Free agent
- (S) Suspended
- Injured

== Regular season ==
=== Season standings ===
Eastern Division	W	L	PCT	GB	Home	Road	Neutral	Div
x-Boston Celtics	59	21	.738	–	26–4	21–17	12–0	25–11
x-Cincinnati Royals	55	25	.688	4	26–7	18–18	11–0	27–9
x-Philadelphia 76ers	34	46	.425	25	18–12	12–22	4–12	13–23
New York Knicks	22	58	.275	37	10–25	8–27	4–6	7–29

=== Season schedule ===
1963–64 game log
#	Date	Opponent	Score	High points	Record
1	October 16	@ St. Louis	112–93	Wayne Embry (25)	1–0
2	October 17	Boston	93–92	Oscar Robertson (20)	1–1
3	October 19	New York	97–121	Oscar Robertson (19)	2–1
4	October 22	San Francisco	97–103	Oscar Robertson (22)	3–1
5	October 25	Los Angeles	122–109	Oscar Robertson (27)	3–2
6	October 26	@ San Francisco	99–102	Jack Twyman (31)	3–3
7	October 29	@ San Francisco	108–101	Oscar Robertson (28)	4–3
8	October 30	@ Los Angeles	115–107	Oscar Robertson (36)	5–3
9	November 1	@ Los Angeles	112–122	Oscar Robertson (26)	5–4
10	November 3	N Philadelphia	93–95	Oscar Robertson (25)	6–4
11	November 6	@ Boston	121–139	Robertson, Twyman (24)	6–5
12	November 8	Boston	115–116	Oscar Robertson (35)	7–5
13	November 9	Detroit	109–118	Wayne Embry (30)	8–5
14	November 13	San Francisco	98–92	Oscar Robertson (28)	8–6
15	November 16	@ New York	114–122	Wayne Embry (27)	8–7
16	November 17	Baltimore	109–110	Oscar Robertson (28)	9–7
17	November 19	N Detroit	102–127	Oscar Robertson (32)	10–7
18	November 20	@ Detroit	118–124	Lucas, Robertson (22)	10–8
19	November 23	@ St. Louis	121–133	Oscar Robertson (33)	10–9
20	November 24	St. Louis	113–122	Oscar Robertson (32)	11–9
21	November 26	N San Francisco	112–123	Oscar Robertson (32)	12–9
22	November 27	@ Baltimore	122–119	Embry, Robertson (28)	13–9
23	November 28	@ Philadelphia	125–110	Oscar Robertson (38)	14–9
24	November 29	New York	110–135	Oscar Robertson (29)	15–9
25	December 1	Los Angeles	114–109	Wayne Embry (39)	15–10
26	December 5	Boston	108–118	Oscar Robertson (48)	16–10
27	December 6	@ Boston	107–112	Oscar Robertson (40)	16–11
28	December 7	@ New York	116–105	Oscar Robertson (35)	17–11
29	December 8	Philadelphia	126–116	Oscar Robertson (32)	17–12
30	December 11	@ Detroit	127–107	Oscar Robertson (26)	18–12
31	December 12	New York	102–112	Jack Twyman (31)	19–12
32	December 14	@ Boston	108–105	Embry, Robertson (25)	20–12
33	December 20	Baltimore	96–103	Oscar Robertson (24)	21–12
34	December 21	@ Baltimore	106–108	Wayne Embry (26)	21–13
35	December 25	St. Louis	107–113	Oscar Robertson (37)	22–13
36	December 27	Boston	87–91	Oscar Robertson (37)	23–13
37	December 29	New York	99–105	Oscar Robertson (29)	24–13
38	January 2	N Detroit	111–112	Oscar Robertson (32)	25–13
39	January 3	@ Philadelphia	110–132	Oscar Robertson (27)	25–14
40	January 4	@ New York	125–116	Oscar Robertson (41)	26–14
41	January 5	Baltimore	106–111	Wayne Embry (27)	27–14
42	January 7	N Philadelphia	110–130	Jack Twyman (29)	28–14
43	January 8	N Philadelphia	110–126	Oscar Robertson (30)	29–14
44	January 10	@ Boston	92–109	Oscar Robertson (32)	29–15
45	January 12	Detroit	88–120	Oscar Robertson (34)	30–15
46	January 16	Los Angeles	95–108	Oscar Robertson (32)	31–15
47	January 18	St. Louis	121–120	Oscar Robertson (40)	31–16
48	January 19	@ St. Louis	109–114	Oscar Robertson (44)	31–17
49	January 21	@ New York	139–124	Oscar Robertson (31)	32–17
50	January 22	Boston	92–109	Oscar Robertson (38)	33–17
51	January 24	@ Philadelphia	111–134	Lucas, Robertson (29)	33–18
52	January 25	@ Baltimore	99–115	Oscar Robertson (27)	33–19
53	January 30	N New York	110–133	Jack Twyman (29)	34–19
54	January 31	N Baltimore	118–106	Oscar Robertson (35)	35–19
55	February 2	@ Boston	119–117 (OT)	Oscar Robertson (48)	36–19
56	February 4	Los Angeles	100–118	Jack Twyman (31)	37–19
57	February 7	Philadelphia	114–126	Oscar Robertson (42)	38–19
58	February 8	@ Baltimore	109–105	Oscar Robertson (30)	39–19
59	February 9	Detroit	107–135	Oscar Robertson (31)	40–19
60	February 12	N Detroit	121–147	Oscar Robertson (38)	41–19
61	February 14	New York	114–126	Oscar Robertson (29)	42–19
62	February 15	@ New York	130–124	Oscar Robertson (44)	43–19
63	February 16	Philadelphia	97–114	Oscar Robertson (32)	44–19
64	February 17	N San Francisco	113–129	Oscar Robertson (45)	45–19
65	February 19	San Francisco	108–101	Oscar Robertson (29)	45–20
66	February 21	@ San Francisco	101–93	Oscar Robertson (32)	46–20
67	February 22	@ Los Angeles	107–105	Oscar Robertson (32)	47–20
68	February 25	@ San Francisco	108–117	Oscar Robertson (26)	47–21
69	February 26	@ Los Angeles	97–103	Oscar Robertson (32)	47–22
70	February 28	N Philadelphia	132–134	Jack Twyman (36)	48–22
71	February 29	@ Philadelphia	117–114	Oscar Robertson (43)	49–22
72	March 1	@ Baltimore	122–111	Oscar Robertson (35)	50–22
73	March 3	@ New York	117–108	Oscar Robertson (33)	51–22
74	March 4	@ Boston	108–112	Oscar Robertson (34)	51–23
75	March 5	Boston	101–111	Oscar Robertson (27)	52–23
76	March 7	Baltimore	101–104	Oscar Robertson (30)	53–23
77	March 10	@ Detroit	103–114	Oscar Robertson (33)	53–24
78	March 12	Philadelphia	111–128	Oscar Robertson (28)	54–24
79	March 14	@ St. Louis	110–118	Oscar Robertson (48)	54–25
80	March 15	St. Louis	101–124	Oscar Robertson (25)	55–25

The Royals consistently posted winning marks over the full season for each month of play. Oct 5–3, Nov 10–6, Dec 9–4, Jan 11–6, Feb 14–3, March 6–3, plus a 4–6 record in the playoffs. Four of the five Boston playoff games took place in April.

== Playoffs ==
1964 playoff game log
Division semifinals: 3–2 (home: 3–0; road: 0–2)

Game	Date	Team	Score	High points	High rebounds	High assists	Location Attendance	Series
1	March 22	Philadelphia	W 127–102	Oscar Robertson (31)	Jerry Lucas (25)	Oscar Robertson (16)	Cincinnati Gardens; 6,238	1–0
2	March 24	@ Philadelphia	L 114–122	Oscar Robertson (30)	Wayne Embry (11)	three players tied (5)	Municipal Auditorium; 4,510	1–1
3	March 25	Philadelphia	W 101–89	Oscar Robertson (28)	Jack Twyman (21)	—	Cincinnati Gardens; 7,171	2–1
4	March 28	@ Philadelphia	L 120–129	Oscar Robertson (31)	Oscar Robertson (14)	Arlen Bockhorn (7)	Municipal Auditorium; 4,255	2–2
5	March 29	Philadelphia	W 130–124	Oscar Robertson (32)	Wayne Embry (17)	—	Cincinnati Gardens; 7,913	3–2

Division finals: 1–4 (home: 1–1; road: 0–3)

Game	Date	Team	Score	High points	High rebounds	High assists	Location Attendance	Series
1	March 31	@ Boston	L 87–103	Wayne Embry (21)	Wayne Embry (16)	Robertson, Arnette (3)	Boston Garden; 13,909	0–1
2	April 2	@ Boston	L 90–101	Oscar Robertson (30)	Oscar Robertson (12)	Oscar Robertson (9)	Boston Garden; 13,909	0–2
3	April 5	Boston	L 92–102	Oscar Robertson (34)	Jerry Lucas (24)	—	Cincinnati Gardens; 11,850	0–3
4	April 7	Boston	W 102–93	Oscar Robertson (33)	Jerry Lucas (25)	Jerry Lucas (10)	Cincinnati Gardens	1–3
5	April 9	@ Boston	L 95–109	Oscar Robertson (24)	Wayne Embry (10)	Oscar Robertson (6)	Boston Garden; 13,909	1–4

1964 schedule

== Player statistics ==
Legend
GP	Games played	GS	Games started	MPG	Minutes per game
FG%	Field-goal percentage	3P%	3-point field-goal percentage	FT%	Free-throw percentage
RPG	Rebounds per game	APG	Assists per game	SPG	Steals per game
BPG	Blocks per game	PPG	Points per game

=== Regular season ===
Robertson led the NBA in assists and was second in scoring. He also led the NBA in free throws made and free throw percentage. Lucas led the NBA in field goal percentage, and was third in rebounding.

Player	GP	GS	MPG	FG%	3FG%	FT%	RPG	APG	SPG	BPG	PPG
Jay Arnette	48		10.4	36.2		77.8	1.1	1.5			3.8
Arlen Bockhorn	70		23.9	41.2		76.2	2.9	2.5			8.3
Bob Boozer	32		22.7	41.6		62.2	5.6	1.0			11.0
Wayne Embry	80		36.4	45.8		65.0	11.6	1.4			17.3
Tom Hawkins	73		24.2	44.1		60.1	6.0	1.0			8.6
Jerry Lucas	79		41.4	52.7		77.9	17.4	2.6			17.7
Bud Olsen	49		10.5	40.5		56.1	3.0	0.6			4.1
Oscar Robertson	79		45.1	48.3		85.3	9.9	11.0			31.4
Adrian Smith	66		23.1	40.6		78.2	2.2	2.2			9.4
Larry Staverman	34		9.4	41.4		83.0	2.8	0.5			4.0
Tom Thacker	48		9.5	29.3		49.1	2.4	1.1			2.8
Jack Twyman	68		29.4	45.0		82.9	5.4	2.0			15.9

=== Playoffs ===
Player	GP	GS	MPG	FG%	3FG%	FT%	RPG	APG	SPG	BPG	PPG
Jay Arnette	8		9.9	35.5		87.5	1.3	1.1			3.6
Arlen Bockhorn	10		30.1	38.0		75.0	3.9	3.9			9.7
Wayne Embry	10		36.3	38.1		62.2	12.4	2.1			13.4
Tom Hawkins	10		27.3	44.3		68.2	9.3	1.1			10.1
Jerry Lucas	10		37.0	39.0		70.3	12.5	3.4			12.2
Bud Olsen	2		5.0	50.0		—	2.0	0.5			3.0
Oscar Robertson	10		47.1	45.5		85.8	8.9	8.4			29.3
Adrian Smith	7		9.4	30.8		71.4	1.3	0.6			3.0
Larry Staverman	7		10.0	47.8		78.9	3.7	0.7			5.3
Tom Thacker	6		7.2	26.1		25.0	2.2	0.5			2.2
Jack Twyman	10		35.4	47.2		79.6	8.7	1.6			20.5

== Awards and honors ==
- Jerry Lucas: NBA Rookie of the Year, Second Team All-NBA, NBA All-Star
- Oscar Robertson: NBA Most Valuable Player, First Team All-NBA, MVP of the 1964 NBA All-Star Game.
- Wayne Embry: NBA All-Star
