= Sam Jones (basketball, born 1933) =

American basketball player (1933–2021)

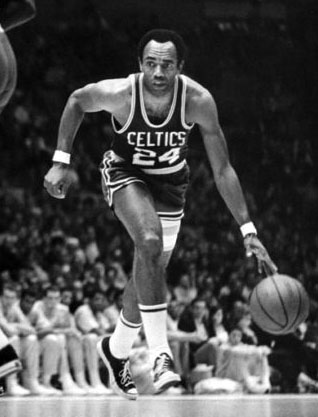
- Jones playing for the Boston Celtics in 1969

Personal information
- Born: June 24, 1933 Laurinburg, North Carolina, U.S.
- Died: December 30, 2021 (aged 88) Boca Raton, Florida, U.S.
- Listed height: 6 ft 4 in (1.93 m)
- Listed weight: 198 lb (90 kg)

Career information
- High school: Laurinburg Institute (Laurinburg, North Carolina)
- College: North Carolina Central (1951–1954, 1956–1957)
- NBA draft: 1957: 1st round, 8th overall pick
- Drafted by: Boston Celtics
- Playing career: 1957–1969
- Position: Shooting guard
- Number: 24
- Coaching career: 1974–1975

Career history

Playing
- 1957–1969: Boston Celtics

Coaching
- 1974–1975: New Orleans Jazz (assistant)

Career highlights
- 10× NBA champion (1959–1966, 1968, 1969); 5× NBA All-Star (1962, 1964–1966, 1968); 3× All-NBA Second Team (1965–1967); NBA anniversary team (25th, 50th, 75th); No. 24 retired by Boston Celtics

Career statistics
- Points: 15,411 (17.7 ppg)
- Rebounds: 4,305 (4.9 rpg)
- Assists: 2,209 (2.5 apg)
- Stats at NBA.com
- Stats at Basketball Reference
- Basketball Hall of Fame
- Collegiate Basketball Hall of Fame

Samuel Jones (June 24, 1933 – December 30, 2021) was an American professional basketball player who was a shooting guard for the Boston Celtics in the National Basketball Association (NBA). A five-time NBA All-Star, he was nicknamed "Mr. Clutch" and "the Shooter" for his quickness and game-winning shots, especially during the NBA playoffs. Jones has the second most NBA championships of any player (10), behind only his teammate Bill Russell (11). He was also one of only three Celtics (along with teammates Russell and K. C. Jones) to be part of each of the Celtics' eight consecutive championships from 1959 to 1966. Jones is a member of the Naismith Memorial Basketball Hall of Fame.

== Early life ==
Jones was born in Laurinburg, North Carolina, on June 24, 1933. He attended Laurinburg Institute.

== College career ==
He studied and played college basketball at North Carolina Central University (then North Carolina College). There, he was a four-year letterwinner for Hall of Fame coach John McLendon and coach Floyd Brown. Jones scored 1,745 points and was a three-time All-CIAA league selection. His number 41 was later retired by the Eagles. He also served in the United States Army for two years. He was intending to become a teacher after graduating.

Jones was originally drafted by the Minneapolis Lakers as the eighth pick of the 1956 NBA draft. However, he opted to return to college to earn his degree upon completion of military service, and therefore voided the Lakers' rights to him under NBA rules.

== Professional career ==
=== Boston Celtics (1957–1969) ===
Boston Celtics Hall of Fame coach Red Auerbach subsequently took a trip south to scout North Carolina players who had just won the national championship. Former Wake Forest coach Bones McKinney told Auerbach he could visit Chapel Hill, but the best player in the state was a few miles away. Eventually, the Philadelphia Warriors selected North Carolina's Lennie Rosenbluth with the sixth pick of the 1957 NBA draft. Boston selected Jones two picks later, even though Auerbach had never seen Jones play.

Jones made his NBA debut on October 22, 1957, recording one rebound in three minutes played against the St. Louis Hawks. He was a reserve for his first few seasons before replacing Bill Sharman as a starter, and earned his first all star appearance in 1962.

Jones was one of only six Boston Celtics to have ever scored 50 points in an NBA game. At the time of his death in 2021, he owned Boston's sixth-best single-game scoring output (51 points vs. Detroit Pistons on October 29, 1965). He also recorded 22 points and 5 rebounds in Game 7 of the 1966 NBA Finals as the Celtics won their eighth straight NBA Finals. Jones ultimately played twelve seasons in the NBA with the Celtics, scoring 15,411 points to go along with 2,209 assists and 4,305 rebounds. He was the franchise's career scoring leader at the time of his retirement in 1969.

== Coaching career ==
After retiring from basketball, Jones coached at Federal City College (now known as University of the District of Columbia) from 1969 to 1973 and at North Carolina Central University, his alma mater, in 1973–74. He was an assistant coach for the New Orleans Jazz in 1974–75.

== Player profile ==
Jones was known as a clutch scorer. He participated in five All-Star Games, and is usually recognized as having been one of the best shooting guards of his generation. Jones was named to the All-NBA Second Team three straight years (1965–67) and he played on 10 championship teams (1959–66 and 1968–69) — a total exceeded only by teammate Bill Russell in NBA history.

Jones' perfect form when shooting a jump shot, along with his great clutch shooting, led opponents to nickname him "The Shooter." He was particularly adept at shooting the bank shot, in which the shooter bounces the ball off the backboard en route to the basket. Many coaches, including UCLA's great John Wooden, believe that when a shooter is at a 20- to 50-degree angle to the backboard and inside 15 feet, a bank shot is always the preferred shot. At 6-foot-4, Jones was the prototype of the tall guard who could run the floor and bang the boards, and had a rangy offensive game that gave opponents fits. One of the "Jones Boys" in Boston, Sam teamed with K. C. Jones in the Celtics' backcourt to create havoc in NBA arenas around the country.

Jones led Boston in scoring five times, and he averaged 20 points or better in four consecutive seasons (1965–1968). He scored 2,909 points in 154 playoff games (18.89 PPG), 92nd best in history as of the 2021 postseason.

== Honors ==
Jones was inducted into the NAIA Basketball Hall of Fame in 1962. Seven years later, he was inducted into the North Carolina Sports Hall of Fame—the first African-American thus honored. Jones was named to the Naismith Memorial Basketball Hall of Fame in 1984. He was named to the NBA 25th Anniversary Team (1971), as one of the 50 Greatest Players in NBA History (1996), and the NBA 75th Anniversary Team (2021). He was part of the inaugural class inducted into the American Basketball Hall of Fame in 2019. In the 2021–2022 NBA season, the Boston Celtics wore a black band with the number 24 on their jersey, to honor Jones who died that year.

== Personal life ==
Jones was married to Gladys Chavis until her death in 2018. Together, they had five children. From 1989 to 1991, he served as the director of athletics for the DC Public Schools Interhigh League. He lived for several decades in Silver Spring, Maryland, during which time he often served as a substitute teacher in the Montgomery County public school system. He resided in St. Augustine, Florida, in retirement.

Jones died on the evening of December 30, 2021, in Boca Raton, Florida. He was 88 years old.

== NBA career statistics ==
Legend
GP	Games played	GS	Games started	MPG	Minutes per game
FG%	Field goal percentage	3P%	3-point field goal percentage	FT%	Free throw percentage
RPG	Rebounds per game	APG	Assists per game	SPG	Steals per game
BPG	Blocks per game	PPG	Points per game	**Bold**	Career high
†	Won an NBA championship

=== Regular season ===
Year	Team	GP	MPG	FG%	FT%	RPG	APG	PPG
1957–58	Boston	56	10.6	.429	.714	2.9	0.7	4.6
1958–59†	Boston	71	20.6	.434	.770	**6.0**	1.4	10.7
1959–60†	Boston	74	20.4	.454	.764	5.1	1.7	11.9
1960–61†	Boston	78	26.0	.449	.787	5.4	2.8	15.0
1961–62†	Boston	78	30.6	.464	.818	5.9	3.0	18.4
1962–63†	Boston	76	30.6	**.476**	.793	5.2	**3.2**	19.7
1963–64†	Boston	76	31.3	.450	.783	4.6	2.7	19.4
1964–65†	Boston	**80**	**36.1**	.452	.820	5.1	2.8	**25.9**
1965–66†	Boston	67	32.2	.469	.799	5.2	**3.2**	23.5
1966–67	Boston	72	32.3	.454	**.857**	4.7	3.0	22.1
1967–68†	Boston	73	33.0	.461	.827	4.9	3.0	21.3
1968–69†	Boston	70	26.0	.450	.783	3.8	2.6	16.3
Career		871	27.9	.456	.803	4.9	2.5	17.7

=== Playoffs ===
Year	Team	GP	MPG	FG%	FT%	RPG	APG	PPG
1958	Boston	8	9.4	.455	.688	3.0	0.5	3.9
1959†	Boston	11	17.5	.370	.846	5.7	1.5	10.3
1960†	Boston	13	15.2	.385	.810	3.2	1.4	8.2
1961†	Boston	10	25.8	.446	**.886**	5.4	2.2	13.1
1962†	Boston	14	36.0	.444	.700	**7.1**	**3.1**	20.6
1963†	Boston	13	34.6	.484	.831	6.2	2.5	23.8
1964†	Boston	10	35.6	**.506**	.735	4.7	2.3	23.2
1965†	Boston	12	**41.3**	.459	.869	4.6	2.5	**28.6**
1966†	Boston	17	35.4	.449	.838	5.1	**3.1**	24.8
1967	Boston	9	36.2	.459	.862	5.1	**3.1**	26.7
1968†	Boston	**19**	36.1	.441	.786	3.4	2.6	20.5
1969†	Boston	18	28.6	.419	.797	3.2	2.1	16.8
Career		154	30.2	.447	.811	4.7	2.3	18.9

== See also ==
- List of NBA single-game playoff scoring leaders
- List of NBA players with most championships
- List of NBA players who have spent their entire career with one franchise
