= 1964 NBA playoffs =

Postseason tournament

Tournament details
- Dates: March 21–April 26, 1964
- Season: 1963–64
- Teams: 6

Final positions
- Champions: Boston Celtics (7th title)
- Runners-up: San Francisco Warriors
- Semifinalists: St. Louis Hawks; Cincinnati Royals

Tournament statistics
- Scoring leader(s): Wilt Chamberlain (Warriors) (34.7 PPG)

The 1964 NBA playoffs was the postseason tournament of the National Basketball Association's 1963–64 season. The tournament concluded with the Eastern Division champion Boston Celtics defeating the Western Division champion San Francisco Warriors 4 games to 1 in the NBA Finals.

Boston earned their 6th straight and 7th overall NBA title, as they continued to dominate the decade; except for 1967, they won every NBA title in the 1960s.

This was the San Francisco Warriors' first trip to the NBA Finals since 1956 when they were based in Philadelphia; they would make a repeat appearance in 1967 and (as the Golden State Warriors) would earn the franchise's third championship in 1975.

The Philadelphia 76ers earned their first playoff appearance in their new city; they had been founded as the independent Syracuse Nationals in 1939 and joined the NBL in 1946.

== Bracket ==
Division Semifinals
E3	Philadelphia	2
E2	Cincinnati	3
W3	Los Angeles	2
W2	St. Louis	3

Division Finals
Eastern Division
E1	Boston*	4
E2	Cincinnati	1
Western Division
W1	San Francisco*	4
W2	St. Louis	3

NBA Finals
E1	Boston*	4
W1	San Francisco*	1

- * Division winner
- Bold Series winner
- Italic Team with home-court advantage in NBA Finals

== Division Semifinals ==
=== Eastern Division Semifinals ===
==== (2) Cincinnati Royals vs. (3) Philadelphia 76ers ====
March 22

Boxscore

Philadelphia 76ers 102, Cincinnati Royals 127
Scoring by quarter: 30–29, 19–32, 25–33, 28–33
Pts: Greer, Kerr 21 each Rebs: Red Kerr 15; Asts: Paul Neumann 8	Pts: Oscar Robertson 31; Rebs: Jerry Lucas 25; Asts: Oscar Robertson 16
Cincinnati leads series, 1–0

Cincinnati Gardens, Cincinnati, Ohio
Attendance: 6,238
Referees: Willie Smith, Sid Borgia

March 24

Boxscore

Cincinnati Royals 114, Philadelphia 76ers 122
Scoring by quarter: 34–36, 32–25, 25–29, 23–32
Pts: Oscar Robertson 30; Rebs: Wayne Embry 11; Asts: three players 5 each	Pts: Hal Greer 29; Rebs: Red Kerr 15; Asts: Hal Greer 7
Series tied, 1–1

Municipal Auditorium, Philadelphia, Pennsylvania
Attendance: 4,510

March 25

Boxscore

Philadelphia 76ers 89, Cincinnati Royals 101
Scoring by quarter: 18–26, 27–32, 19–23, 25–20
Pts: Chet Walker 21; Rebs: Red Kerr 19	Pts: Oscar Robertson 28; Rebs: Jack Twyman 21
Cincinnati leads series, 2–1

Cincinnati Gardens, Cincinnati, Ohio
Attendance: 7,171

March 28

Boxscore

Cincinnati Royals 120, Philadelphia 76ers 129
Scoring by quarter: 28–31, 33–29, 24–36, 35–33
Pts: Oscar Robertson 31; Rebs: Oscar Robertson 14; Asts: Bucky Bockhorn 7	Pts: Hal Greer 22; Rebs: Ben Warley 15; Asts: Hal Greer 8
Series tied, 2–2

Municipal Auditorium, Philadelphia, Pennsylvania
Attendance: 4,255

March 29

Boxscore

Philadelphia 76ers 124, Cincinnati Royals 130
Scoring by quarter: 23–29, 36–30, 28–35, 37–36
Pts: Red Kerr 31; Rebs: Red Kerr 11	Pts: Oscar Robertson 32; Rebs: Wayne Embry 17
Cincinnati wins series, 3–2

Cincinnati Gardens, Cincinnati, Ohio
Attendance: 7,913

This was the second playoff meeting between these two teams, with the Royals winning the first meeting when the 76ers were the Syracuse Nationals.

Previous playoff series
Cincinnati leads 1–0 in all-time playoff series

1963

Syracuse Nationals 2, Cincinnati Royals 3

1963 Eastern Division Semifinals

=== Western Division Semifinals ===
==== (2) St. Louis Hawks vs. (3) Los Angeles Lakers ====
March 21

Boxscore

Los Angeles Lakers 104, St. Louis Hawks 115
Scoring by quarter: 23–32, 35–25, 29–29, 17–29
Pts: Jerry West 35; Rebs: Elgin Baylor 15; Asts: Dick Barnett 5	Pts: Cliff Hagan 27; Rebs: Bob Pettit 22; Asts: Hagan, Wilkens 7 each
St. Louis leads series, 1–0

Kiel Auditorium, St. Louis, Missouri
Attendance: 7,214

March 22

Boxscore

Los Angeles Lakers 90, St. Louis Hawks 106
Scoring by quarter: 22–21, 19–27, 26–24, 23–34
Pts: Elgin Baylor 20; Rebs: LeRoy Ellis 18; Asts: Jim King 4	Pts: Richie Guerin 22; Rebs: Bob Pettit 18; Asts: Cliff Hagan 6
St. Louis leads series, 2–0

Kiel Auditorium, St. Louis, Missouri
Attendance: 7,014

March 25

Boxscore

St. Louis Hawks 105, Los Angeles Lakers 107
Scoring by quarter: 22–33, 27–26, 29–24, 27–24
Pts: Bob Pettit 23; Rebs: Bob Pettit 10; Asts: Cliff Hagan 5	Pts: Jerry West 39; Rebs: Elgin Baylor 16; Asts: Elgin Baylor 11
St. Louis leads series, 2–1

Los Angeles Memorial Sports Arena, Los Angeles, California
Attendance: 11,728

March 28

Boxscore

St. Louis Hawks 88, Los Angeles Lakers 97
Scoring by quarter: 23–23, 26–18, 18–34, 21–22
Pts: Bob Pettit 23; Rebs: Bob Pettit 12; Asts: Lenny Wilkens 7	Pts: Jerry West 39; Rebs: LeRoy Ellis 11; Asts: Elgin Baylor 10
Series tied, 2–2

Los Angeles Memorial Sports Arena, Los Angeles, California
Attendance: 13,862

March 30

Boxscore

Los Angeles Lakers 108, St. Louis Hawks 121
Scoring by quarter: 25–34, 31–22, 19–31, 33–34
Pts: Elgin Baylor 28; Rebs: Elgin Baylor 11; Asts: Dick Barnett 4	Pts: Lenny Wilkens 30; Rebs: Bob Pettit 20; Asts: Hagan, Guerin 6 each
St. Louis wins series, 3–2

Kiel Auditorium, St. Louis, Missouri
Attendance: 9,574

This was the seventh playoff meeting between these two teams, with the Hawks winning four of the first six meetings.

Previous playoff series
St. Louis leads 4–2 in all-time playoff series

1956

St. Louis Hawks 2, Minneapolis Lakers 1

1956 Western Division Semifinals

1957

St. Louis Hawks 3, Minneapolis Lakers 0

1957 Western Division Finals

1959

St. Louis Hawks 2, Minneapolis Lakers 4

1959 Western Division Finals

1960

St. Louis Hawks 4, Minneapolis Lakers 3

1960 Western Division Finals

1961

St. Louis Hawks 4, Los Angeles Lakers 3

1961 Western Division Finals

1963

St. Louis Hawks 3, Los Angeles Lakers 4

1963 Western Division Finals

== Division Finals ==
=== Eastern Division Finals ===
==== (1) Boston Celtics vs. (2) Cincinnati Royals ====
March 31

Boxscore

Cincinnati Royals 87, Boston Celtics 103
Scoring by quarter: 21–23, 19–26, 21–26, 26–28
Pts: Wayne Embry 21; Rebs: Wayne Embry 16; Asts: Robertson, Arnette 3 each	Pts: Sam Jones 27; Rebs: Bill Russell 31; Asts: K. C. Jones 9
Boston leads series, 1–0

Boston Garden, Boston, Massachusetts
Attendance: 13,909

April 2

Boxscore

Cincinnati Royals 90, Boston Celtics 101
Scoring by quarter: 19–29, 23–21, 22–27, 26–24
Pts: Oscar Robertson 30; Rebs: Oscar Robertson 12; Asts: Oscar Robertson 9	Pts: Tom Heinsohn 31; Rebs: Bill Russell 28; Asts: K. C. Jones 8
Boston leads series, 2–0

Boston Garden, Boston, Massachusetts
Attendance: 13,909

April 5

Boxscore

Boston Celtics 102, Cincinnati Royals 92
Scoring by quarter: 25–21, 30–16, 26–27, 21–28
Pts: Bill Russell 22; Rebs: Bill Russell 28	Pts: Oscar Robertson 34; Rebs: Jerry Lucas 24
Boston leads series, 3–0

Cincinnati Gardens, Cincinnati, Ohio
Attendance: 11,850

April 7

Boxscore

Boston Celtics 93, Cincinnati Royals 102
Scoring by quarter: 25–25, 24–21, 23–29, 21–27
Pts: Sam Jones 33; Rebs: Bill Russell 24; Asts: K. C. Jones 5	Pts: Oscar Robertson 33; Rebs: Jerry Lucas 25; Asts: Jerry Lucas 10
Boston leads series, 3–1

Cincinnati Gardens, Cincinnati, Ohio

April 9

Boxscore

Cincinnati Royals 95, Boston Celtics 109
Scoring by quarter: 19–33, 22–26, 21–26, 33–24
Pts: Oscar Robertson 24; Rebs: Wayne Embry 10; Asts: Oscar Robertson 6	Pts: Sam Jones 23; Rebs: Bill Russell 35; Asts: Russell, K. C. Jones 7 each
Boston wins series, 4–1

Boston Garden, Boston, Massachusetts
Attendance: 13,909

This was the second playoff meeting between these two teams, with the Celtics winning the first meeting.

Previous playoff series
Boston leads 1–0 in all-time playoff series

1963

Boston Celtics 4, Cincinnati Royals 3

1963 Eastern Division Finals

=== Western Division Finals ===
==== (1) San Francisco Warriors vs. (2) St. Louis Hawks ====
April 1

Boxscore

St. Louis Hawks 116, San Francisco Warriors 111
Scoring by quarter: 24–25, 15–32, 25–22, 32–29
Pts: Richie Guerin 32	Pts: Wilt Chamberlain 37
St. Louis leads series, 1–0

War Memorial Gymnasium, San Francisco, California
Attendance: 5,231

This is the only playoff game that was held in the San Francisco city limit until 2022.

April 3

Boxscore

St. Louis Hawks 85, San Francisco Warriors 120
Scoring by quarter: 23–28, 21–34, 18–28, 23–30
Pts: Richie Guerin 23	Pts: Wilt Chamberlain 28
Series tied, 1–1

Cow Palace, Daly City, California
Attendance: 9,063

April 5

Boxscore

San Francisco Warriors 109, St. Louis Hawks 113
Scoring by quarter: 28–29, 31–33, 25–23, 25–28
Pts: Wilt Chamberlain 46	Pts: Bob Pettit 26
St. Louis leads series, 2–1

Kiel Auditorium, St. Louis, Missouri
Attendance: 10,163

April 8

Boxscore

San Francisco Warriors 111, St. Louis Hawks 109
Scoring by quarter: 28–30, 28–24, 27–28, 28–27
Pts: Wilt Chamberlain 36	Pts: Bob Pettit 29
Series tied, 2–2

Kiel Auditorium, St. Louis, Missouri
Attendance: 10,118

April 10

Boxscore

St. Louis Hawks 97, San Francisco Warriors 121
Scoring by quarter: 21–36, 28–22, 21–29, 27–34
Pts: Bob Pettit 19; Rebs: Bob Pettit 11	Pts: Wilt Chamberlain 50; Rebs: Chamberlain, Thurmond 15 each
San Francisco leads series, 3–2

Cow Palace, Daly City, California
Attendance: 10,628

April 12

Boxscore

San Francisco Warriors 95, St. Louis Hawks 123
Scoring by quarter: 16–28, 17–31, 36–34, 26–30
Pts: Wilt Chamberlain 34	Pts: Bob Pettit 21
Series tied, 3–3

Kiel Auditorium, St. Louis, Missouri
Attendance: 8,967

April 16

Boxscore

St. Louis Hawks 95, San Francisco Warriors 105
Scoring by quarter: 33–32, 19–21, 25–23, 18–29
Pts: Bob Pettit 24; Rebs: Bob Pettit 14; Asts: Cliff Hagan 5	Pts: Wilt Chamberlain 39; Rebs: Wilt Chamberlain 30; Asts: Guy Rodgers 8
San Francisco wins series, 4–3

Cow Palace, Daly City, California
Attendance: 8,923

This was the first playoff meeting between these two teams.

== NBA Finals: (E1) Boston Celtics vs. (W1) San Francisco Warriors ==
April 18

Boxscore

San Francisco Warriors 96, Boston Celtics 108
Scoring by quarter: 24–25, 15–32, 25–22, 32–29
Pts: Wilt Chamberlain 22; Rebs: Wilt Chamberlain 23; Asts: Guy Rodgers 8	Pts: Sam Jones 28; Rebs: Bill Russell 25; Asts: K. C. Jones 7
Boston leads series, 1–0

Boston Garden, Boston, Massachusetts
Attendance: 13,909

April 20

Boxscore

San Francisco Warriors 101, Boston Celtics 124
Scoring by quarter: 22–31, 21–31, 25–36, 33–26
Pts: Wilt Chamberlain 32; Rebs: Wilt Chamberlain 25; Asts: Phillips, Rodgers 4 each	Pts: Sam Jones 31; Rebs: Bill Russell 24; Asts: Bill Russell 9
Boston leads series, 2–0

Boston Garden, Boston, Massachusetts
Attendance: 13,909

April 22

Boxscore

Boston Celtics 91, San Francisco Warriors 115
Scoring by quarter: 21–40, 22–27, 21–23, 27–25
Pts: John Havlicek 22; Rebs: Bill Russell 32; Asts: K. C. Jones 8	Pts: Wilt Chamberlain 35; Rebs: Wilt Chamberlain 25; Asts: Guy Rodgers 7
Boston leads series, 2–1

Cow Palace, Daly City, California
Attendance: 10,981

April 24

Boxscore

Boston Celtics 98, San Francisco Warriors 95
Scoring by quarter: 17–24, 23–20, 36–20, 22–31
Pts: Tom Heinsohn 25; Rebs: Bill Russell 19; Asts: K. C. Jones 5	Pts: Wilt Chamberlain 27; Rebs: Wilt Chamberlain 38; Asts: Guy Rodgers 6
Boston leads series, 3–1

Cow Palace, Daly City, California
Attendance: 14,862

April 26

Boxscore

San Francisco Warriors 99, Boston Celtics 105
Scoring by quarter: 24–22, 17–23, 30–29, 28–31
Pts: Wilt Chamberlain 30; Rebs: Wilt Chamberlain 27; Asts: Guy Rodgers 7	Pts: Tom Heinsohn 19; Rebs: Bill Russell 26; Asts: Bill Russell 6
Boston wins series, 4–1

Boston Garden, Boston, Massachusetts
Attendance: 13,909

This was the fourth playoff meeting between these two teams, with the Celtics winning the first three meetings when the Warriors were based in Philadelphia.

Previous playoff series
Boston leads 3–0 in all-time playoff series

1958

Boston Celtics 4, Philadelphia Warriors 1

1958 Eastern Division Finals

1960

Boston Celtics 4, Philadelphia Warriors 2

1960 Eastern Division Finals

1962

Boston Celtics 4, Philadelphia Warriors 3

1962 Eastern Division Finals

== See also ==
- 1964 NBA Finals
- 1963–64 NBA season
