= 1963–64 Philadelphia 76ers season =

Season of National Basketball Association team the Philadelphia 76ers

- Head coach: Dolph Schayes
- General manager: Irv Kosloff
- Owner: Irv Kosloff
- Arena: Municipal Auditorium

Results
- Record: 34–46 (.425)
- Place: Division: 3rd (Eastern)
- Playoff finish: Division semifinals (lost to Royals 2–3)
- Stats at Basketball Reference

Local media
- Television: WFIL-TV
- Radio: WCAU

The 1963–64 Philadelphia 76ers season was the 76ers' 15th season in the NBA and 1st season in Philadelphia. The team participated in the 1963 NBA draft as the Syracuse Nationals for the final time, as the draft was held before they relocated to Philadelphia and become the 76ers. They finished the regular season with a 34–46 record, placing third in the East enough to clinch a playoff berth. However, they were eliminated in the division semifinals by the Cincinnati Royals after five games.

== Roster ==
1963–64 Philadelphia 76ers roster
Players

Pos.	No.	Player	Height	Weight	DOB	From
G	24	Al Bianchi	6 ft 3 in (1.91 m)	185 lb (84 kg)	1932-03-26	Bowling Green
G	21	Larry Costello	6 ft 1 in (1.85 m)	186 lb (84 kg)	1931-07-02	Niagara
C	29	Connie Dierking	6 ft 9 in (2.06 m)	222 lb (101 kg)	1936-10-02	Cincinnati
F	20	Dave Gambee	6 ft 6 in (1.98 m)	215 lb (98 kg)	1937-04-16	Oregon State
G	22	Jerry Greenspan	6 ft 5 in (1.96 m)	195 lb (88 kg)	1941-11-22	Maryland
G	15	Hal Greer	6 ft 2 in (1.88 m)	175 lb (79 kg)	1936-06-26	Marshall
C	10	Red Kerr	6 ft 9 in (2.06 m)	230 lb (104 kg)	1932-07-17	Illinois
G	5	Paul Neumann	6 ft 1 in (1.85 m)	175 lb (79 kg)	1938-01-30	Stanford
F	4	Dolph Schayes	6 ft 8 in (2.03 m)	220 lb (100 kg)	1928-05-19	NYU
F	22	Lee Shaffer	6 ft 7 in (2.01 m)	220 lb (100 kg)	1939-02-23	North Carolina
F	25	Chet Walker	6 ft 6 in (1.98 m)	212 lb (96 kg)	1940-02-22	Bradley
F	14	Ben Warley	6 ft 5 in (1.96 m)	200 lb (91 kg)	1936-09-04	Tennessee State
G	23	Hubie White	6 ft 4 in (1.93 m)	205 lb (93 kg)	1940-01-26	Villanova

Coaches
Head coach
- Dolph Schayes

Legend
- (DP) Unsigned draft pick
- (FA) Free agent
- (S) Suspended
- Injured

Roster
Updated: October 21, 1963

== Regular season ==
=== Season standings ===
Eastern Division	W	L	PCT	GB	Home	Road	Neutral	Div
x-Boston Celtics	59	21	.738	–	26–4	21–17	12–0	25–11
x-Cincinnati Royals	55	25	.688	4	26–7	18–18	11–0	27–9
x-Philadelphia 76ers	34	46	.425	25	18–12	12–22	4–12	13–23
New York Knicks	22	58	.275	37	10–25	8–27	4–6	7–29

x – clinched playoff spot

=== Game log ===
1963–64 game log
#	Date	Opponent	Score	High points	Record
1	October 16	@ Detroit	117–115	Hal Greer (26)	1–0
2	October 19	Detroit	124–121	Lee Shaffer (31)	1–1
3	October 25	New York	136–112	Hal Greer (20)	1–2
4	October 26	@ New York	101–109	Johnny Kerr (34)	1–3
5	October 30	@ Baltimore	111–108	Hal Greer (39)	2–3
6	November 1	Boston	119–102	Hal Greer (24)	2–4
7	November 2	@ St. Louis	99–128	Chet Walker (27)	2–5
8	November 3	N Cincinnati	93–95	Lee Shaffer (22)	2–6
9	November 6	@ Detroit	101–119	Chet Walker (24)	2–7
10	November 8	St. Louis	106–108	Lee Shaffer (29)	3–7
11	November 9	@ Baltimore	100–116	Lee Shaffer (29)	3–8
12	November 12	San Francisco	102–106 (OT)	Lee Shaffer (36)	4–8
13	November 15	Los Angeles	97–99	Hal Greer (33)	5–8
14	November 20	New York	101–118	Lee Shaffer (36)	6–8
15	November 26	Baltimore	113–115	Lee Shaffer (32)	7–8
16	November 28	Cincinnati	125–110	Lee Shaffer (42)	7–9
17	November 29	N Boston	78–112	Lee Shaffer (16)	7–10
18	November 30	@ New York	132–125	Hal Greer (43)	8–10
19	December 1	N Detroit	132–121	Hal Greer (43)	9–10
20	December 5	St. Louis	106–103	Chet Walker (33)	9–11
21	December 7	@ St. Louis	120–129	Ben Warley (31)	9–12
22	December 8	@ Cincinnati	126–116	Johnny Kerr (33)	10–12
23	December 10	N St. Louis	113–103	Johnny Kerr (32)	10–13
24	December 11	New York	103–113	Johnny Kerr (29)	11–13
25	December 13	Boston	111–84	Al Bianchi (15)	11–14
26	December 14	@ New York	123–119	Johnny Kerr (30)	12–14
27	December 18	@ Los Angeles	96–116	Chet Walker (19)	12–15
28	December 20	@ San Francisco	114–112	Hal Greer (34)	13–15
29	December 21	@ Los Angeles	113–126	Hal Greer (17)	13–16
30	December 22	@ San Francisco	104–118	Johnny Kerr (28)	13–17
31	December 26	San Francisco	112–118	Hal Greer (31)	14–17
32	December 27	N Detroit	119–107	Chet Walker (29)	15–17
33	December 28	Los Angeles	100–114	Hal Greer (24)	16–17
34	January 3	Cincinnati	110–132	Hal Greer (33)	17–17
35	January 4	@ Baltimore	123–113	Hal Greer (37)	18–17
36	January 5	New York	142–118	Ben Warley (21)	18–18
37	January 7	N Cincinnati	110–130	Hal Greer (22)	18–19
38	January 8	N Cincinnati	110–126	Johnny Kerr (25)	18–20
39	January 9	St. Louis	115–122	Johnny Kerr (34)	19–20
40	January 11	Boston	108–115	Hal Greer (26)	20–20
41	January 12	@ Boston	112–123	Chet Walker (26)	20–21
42	January 17	San Francisco	112–91	Hal Greer (18)	20–22
43	January 18	N Los Angeles	111–115	Chet Walker (27)	20–23
44	January 21	N Baltimore	121–124	Hal Greer (36)	20–24
45	January 22	@ Baltimore	116–124	Chet Walker (22)	20–25
46	January 24	Cincinnati	111–134	Chet Walker (27)	21–25
47	January 25	@ New York	131–129	Hal Greer (26)	22–25
48	January 26	Baltimore	131–120	Johnny Kerr (22)	22–26
49	January 28	San Francisco	139–117	Hal Greer (41)	22–27
50	January 29	N Los Angeles	102–97	Hal Greer (26)	23–27
51	January 31	@ Boston	97–114	Hal Greer (25)	23–28
52	February 1	Boston	119–111	Chet Walker (30)	23–29
53	February 6	New York	117–128	Hal Greer (33)	24–29
54	February 7	@ Cincinnati	114–126	Hal Greer (25)	24–30
55	February 8	Los Angeles	101–109	Hal Greer (21)	25–30
56	February 9	@ Boston	109–120	Hal Greer (26)	25–31
57	February 12	@ Baltimore	115–121	Greer, Kerr (22)	25–32
58	February 14	Detroit	123–130	Hal Greer (29)	26–32
59	February 15	@ St. Louis	110–118	Kerr, Neumann (22)	26–33
60	February 16	@ Cincinnati	97–114	Hal Greer (30)	26–34
61	February 18	N Boston	93–103	Hal Greer (26)	26–35
62	February 19	Baltimore	122–130	Chet Walker (29)	27–35
63	February 21	Boston	119–144	Hal Greer (50)	28–35
64	February 23	@ New York	114–105	Hal Greer (28)	29–35
65	February 25	N St. Louis	115–107	Hal Greer (29)	29–36
66	February 26	@ Detroit	130–122	Johnny Kerr (36)	30–36
67	February 28	N Cincinnati	132–134	Johnny Kerr (36)	30–37
68	February 29	Cincinnati	117–114	Hal Greer (28)	30–38
69	March 1	@ Boston	93–108	Chet Walker (25)	30–39
70	March 3	N Boston	94–108	Hal Greer (29)	30–40
71	March 7	New York	115–130	Johnny Kerr (23)	31–40
72	March 8	@ New York	108–140	Hal Greer (27)	31–41
73	March 11	@ St. Louis	124–111	Hal Greer (42)	32–41
74	March 12	@ Cincinnati	111–128	Paul Neumann (28)	32–42
75	March 13	N Detroit	122–133	Johnny Kerr (24)	32–43
76	March 14	N Baltimore	128–122	Paul Neumann (26)	33–43
77	March 15	@ Los Angeles	95–120	Paul Neumann (13)	33–44
78	March 16	@ San Francisco	111–110	Hal Greer (34)	34–44
79	March 17	@ Los Angeles	97–121	Paul Neumann (22)	34–45
80	March 18	@ San Francisco	85–89	Hal Greer (26)	34–46

== Playoffs ==
1964 playoff game log
Division semifinals: 2–3 (home: 2–0; road: 0–3)

Game	Date	Team	Score	High points	High rebounds	High assists	Location Attendance	Series
1	March 22	@ Cincinnati	L 102–127	Greer, Kerr (21)	Red Kerr (15)	Paul Neumann (8)	Cincinnati Gardens; 6,238	0–1
2	March 24	Cincinnati	W 122–114	Hal Greer (29)	Red Kerr (15)	Hal Greer (7)	Municipal Auditorium; 4,510	1–1
3	March 25	@ Cincinnati	L 89–101	Chet Walker (21)	Red Kerr (19)	Hal Greer (5)	Cincinnati Gardens; 7,171	1–2
4	March 28	Cincinnati	W 129–120	Hal Greer (22)	Ben Warley (15)	Hal Greer (8)	Municipal Auditorium; 4,255	2–2
5	March 29	@ Cincinnati	L 124–130	Red Kerr (31)	Red Kerr (11)	Hal Greer (6)	Cincinnati Gardens; 7,913	2–3

1964 schedule

== Awards and records ==
- Hal Greer, All-NBA Second Team
