= 1963–64 Boston Celtics season =

NBA basketball team season (NBA champions)

- NBA champions
- Division champions
- Head coach: Red Auerbach
- Arena: Boston Garden

Results
- Record: 59–21 (.738)
- Place: Division: 1st (Eastern)
- Playoff finish: NBA champions (Defeated Warriors 4–1)
- Stats at Basketball Reference

Local media
- Television: WHDH-TV
- Radio: WHDH

The 1963–64 Boston Celtics season was the Celtics' 18th season in the NBA. The Celtics finished the season by winning their seventh NBA Championship.

== Offseason ==
=== NBA draft ===
Round	Pick	Player	Position	Nationality	School/Club team
1	8	Bill Green	Forward	United States	Colorado State

== Roster ==
1963–64 Boston Celtics roster
Players

Pos.	No.	Player	Height	Weight	DOB	From
G/F	17	John Havlicek	6 ft 5 in (1.96 m)	203 lb (92 kg)		Ohio State
F	15	Tom Heinsohn	6 ft 7 in (2.01 m)	218 lb (99 kg)		Holy Cross
G	25	K. C. Jones	6 ft 1 in (1.85 m)	200 lb (91 kg)		San Francisco
G/F	24	Sam Jones	6 ft 4 in (1.93 m)	198 lb (90 kg)		North Carolina Central
F	12	Willie Naulls	6 ft 6 in (1.98 m)	225 lb (102 kg)		UCLA
C	6	Bill Russell	6 ft 10 in (2.08 m)	215 lb (98 kg)		San Francisco
F	16	Satch Sanders	6 ft 6 in (1.98 m)	210 lb (95 kg)		NYU
G	20	Larry Siegfried	6 ft 3 in (1.91 m)	190 lb (86 kg)		Ohio State
SF	18	Jim Loscutoff	6 ft 5 in (1.96 m)	220 lb (100 kg)		Oregon
C	34	Clyde Lovellette	6 ft 9 in (2.06 m)	234 lb (106 kg)		Kansas
PG	21	Johnny McCarthy	6 ft 1 in (1.85 m)	185 lb (84 kg)		Canisius
G/F	23	Frank Ramsey	6 ft 3 in (1.91 m)	190 lb (86 kg)		Kentucky

Coaches
Head coach
- Red Auerbach

Legend
- (DP) Unsigned draft pick
- (FA) Free agent
- (S) Suspended
- Injured

== Regular season ==
A time of continued competitiveness was created by the Celtics in this period. After the retirement of point guard Bob Cousy, the head coach Red Auerbach made use of defensive teams consisting of K. C. Jones, Tom 'Satch' Sanders, and Bill Russell at the center position. The squad won back to back titles, spearheaded by Russell who was the best rebounds and one of the best shot blockers in the league. The offense had six players scoring more than ten points per game and two others more than eight points per game, with John Havlicek being the leading sixth man with 20 points per game.

=== Season standings ===
Eastern Division	W	L	PCT	GB	Home	Road	Neutral	Div
x-Boston Celtics	59	21	.738	–	26–4	21–17	12–0	25–11
x-Cincinnati Royals	55	25	.688	4	26–7	18–18	11–0	27–9
x-Philadelphia 76ers	34	46	.425	25	18–12	12–22	4–12	13–23
New York Knicks	22	58	.275	37	10–25	8–27	4–6	7–29

=== Game log ===
1963–64 game log
#	Date	Opponent	Score	High points	Record
1	October 16	@ Baltimore	109–95	John Havlicek (24)	1–0
2	October 17	@ Cincinnati	93–92	Sam Jones (24)	2–0
3	October 26	Baltimore	108–123	John Havlicek (24)	3–0
4	October 30	@ Detroit	108–102	John Havlicek (22)	4–0
5	November 1	@ Philadelphia	119–102	Sam Jones (28)	5–0
6	November 2	Detroit	109–117	Bill Russell (25)	6–0
7	November 6	Cincinnati	121–139	Sam Jones (28)	7–0
8	November 8	@ Cincinnati	115–116	John Havlicek (28)	7–1
9	November 9	@ St. Louis	113–91	Sam Jones (34)	8–1
10	November 11	St. Louis	110–116	Bill Russell (20)	9–1
11	November 13	N Los Angeles	110–114	Tom Heinsohn (31)	10–1
12	November 15	New York	116–133	Tom Heinsohn (24)	11–1
13	November 19	@ New York	126–98	Sam Jones (19)	12–1
14	November 27	Los Angeles	78–114	Sam Jones (20)	13–1
15	November 29	N Philadelphia	78–112	Tom Heinsohn (18)	14–1
16	November 30	San Francisco	96–109	Sam Jones (27)	15–1
17	December 5	@ Cincinnati	108–118	John Havlicek (22)	15–2
18	December 6	Cincinnati	107–112	Sam Jones (30)	16–2
19	December 7	@ Baltimore	114–97	John Havlicek (30)	17–2
20	December 10	@ New York	132–113	Havlicek, Heinsohn (27)	18–2
21	December 11	St. Louis	95–104	John Havlicek (33)	19–2
22	December 13	@ Philadelphia	111–84	Willie Naulls (30)	20–2
23	December 14	Cincinnati	108–105	John Havlicek (35)	20–3
24	December 17	N Baltimore	131–114	John Havlicek (43)	21–3
25	December 18	New York	111–133	John Havlicek (27)	22–3
26	December 19	N New York	140–143	Sam Jones (36)	23–3
27	December 21	@ New York	117–127	Clyde Lovellette (24)	23–4
28	December 26	Los Angeles	110–126	Satch Sanders (21)	24–4
29	December 27	@ Cincinnati	87–91	Sam Jones (20)	24–5
30	December 28	@ St. Louis	107–100	Sam Jones (22)	25–5
31	January 3	@ San Francisco	111–101	Sam Jones (25)	26–5
32	January 4	@ Los Angeles	118–125 (OT)	Frank Ramsey (28)	26–6
33	January 5	@ Los Angeles	95–97	Sam Jones (25)	26–7
34	January 7	@ San Francisco	89–92	Sam Jones (23)	26–8
35	January 10	Cincinnati	92–109	Sam Jones (28)	27–8
36	January 11	@ Philadelphia	108–115	John Havlicek (26)	27–9
37	January 12	Philadelphia	112–123	Willie Naulls (23)	28–9
38	January 15	@ Baltimore	113–108	Satch Sanders (18)	29–9
39	January 17	Los Angeles	79–99	John Havlicek (27)	30–9
40	January 18	@ Detroit	121–115	John Havlicek (30)	31–9
41	January 19	San Francisco	105–108	Tom Heinsohn (27)	32–9
42	January 21	@ St. Louis	114–116	Sam Jones (20)	32–10
43	January 22	@ Cincinnati	92–109	John Havlicek (29)	32–11
44	January 23	N St. Louis	104–110	John Havlicek (28)	33–11
45	January 24	St. Louis	99–119	Satch Sanders (16)	34–11
46	January 26	New York	102–115	Willie Naulls (20)	35–11
47	January 28	@ New York	127–133	Sam Jones (32)	35–12
48	January 29	San Francisco	100–92	Sam Jones (25)	35–13
49	January 31	Philadelphia	97–114	Tom Heinsohn (24)	36–13
50	February 1	@ Philadelphia	119–111	John Havlicek (31)	37–13
51	February 2	Cincinnati	119–117 (OT)	John Havlicek (40)	37–14
52	February 4	N St. Louis	101–113	Bill Russell (28)	38–14
53	February 6	N Baltimore	94–92	John Havlicek (20)	39–14
54	February 7	New York	112–133	Willie Naulls (27)	40–14
55	February 8	@ New York	135–114	Sam Jones (35)	41–14
56	February 9	Philadelphia	109–120	Sam Jones (27)	42–14
57	February 11	Los Angeles	113–109	Bill Russell (26)	42–15
58	February 12	@ Los Angeles	104–97 (OT)	Tom Heinsohn (23)	43–15
59	February 13	@ San Francisco	95–106	Sam Jones (19)	43–16
60	February 15	@ San Francisco	96–87	John Havlicek (25)	44–16
61	February 16	@ Los Angeles	92–90	John Havlicek (21)	45–16
62	February 18	N Philadelphia	93–103	Frank Ramsey (22)	46–16
63	February 20	N Baltimore	129–113	Sam Jones (25)	47–16
64	February 21	@ Philadelphia	119–144	Willie Naulls (21)	47–17
65	February 22	@ St. Louis	88–95	John Havlicek (23)	47–18
66	February 24	@ Detroit	113–115	Tom Heinsohn (27)	47–19
67	February 25	@ New York	114–102	Tom Heinsohn (23)	48–19
68	February 26	@ Baltimore	100–87	Bill Russell (20)	49–19
69	February 28	San Francisco	92–107	Havlicek, Russell (16)	50–19
70	February 29	N Detroit	108–115	Sam Jones (35)	51–19
71	March 1	Philadelphia	93–108	Sam Jones (20)	52–19
72	March 3	N Philadelphia	94–108	Tom Heinsohn (23)	53–19
73	March 4	Cincinnati	108–112	John Havlicek (28)	54–19
74	March 5	@ Cincinnati	101–111	Bill Russell (19)	54–20
75	March 7	@ Detroit	112–94	John Havlicek (24)	55–20
76	March 8	Detroit	118–128	John Havlicek (34)	56–20
77	March 12	N Detroit	120–140	Clyde Lovellette (21)	57–20
78	March 15	Baltimore	105–129	Clyde Lovellette (24)	58–20
79	March 17	New York	121–127	Sam Jones (26)	59–20
80	March 18	@ Baltimore	95–108	Tom Heinsohn (25)	59–21

== Playoffs ==
1964 playoff game log
Division Finals: 4–1 (home: 3–0; road: 1–1)

Game	Date	Team	Score	High points	High rebounds	High assists	Location Attendance	Series
1	March 31	Cincinnati	W 103–87	Sam Jones (27)	Bill Russell (31)	K. C. Jones (9)	Boston Garden; 13,909	1–0
2	April 2	Cincinnati	W 101–90	Tom Heinsohn (31)	Bill Russell (28)	K. C. Jones (8)	Boston Garden; 13,909	2–0
3	April 5	@ Cincinnati	W 102–92	Bill Russell (22)	Bill Russell (28)	K. C. Jones (6)	Cincinnati Gardens; 11,850	3–0
4	April 7	@ Cincinnati	L 93–102	Sam Jones (33)	Bill Russell (24)	K. C. Jones (5)	Cincinnati Gardens	3–1
5	April 9	Cincinnati	W 109–95	Sam Jones (23)	Bill Russell (35)	Russell, K. C. Jones (7)	Boston Garden; 13,909	4–1

NBA Finals: 4–1 (home: 3–0; road: 1–1)

Game	Date	Team	Score	High points	High rebounds	High assists	Location Attendance	Series
1	April 18	San Francisco	W 108–96	Sam Jones (28)	Bill Russell (25)	K. C. Jones (7)	Boston Garden; 13,909	1–0
2	April 20	San Francisco	W 124–101	Sam Jones (31)	Bill Russell (24)	Bill Russell (9)	Boston Garden; 13,909	2–0
3	April 22	@ San Francisco	L 91–115	John Havlicek (22)	Bill Russell (32)	K. C. Jones (8)	Cow Palace; 10,981	2–1
4	April 24	@ San Francisco	W 98–95	Tom Heinsohn (25)	Bill Russell (19)	K. C. Jones (5)	Cow Palace; 14,862	3–1
5	April 26	San Francisco	W 105–99	Tom Heinsohn (19)	Bill Russell (26)	Bill Russell (6)	Boston Garden; 13,909	4–1

1964 schedule

== Awards and honors ==
- Bill Russell, All-NBA Second Team
- Tom Heinsohn, All-NBA Second Team
- John Havlicek, All-NBA Second Team
