= Jay Arnette =

American basketball player (born 1938)

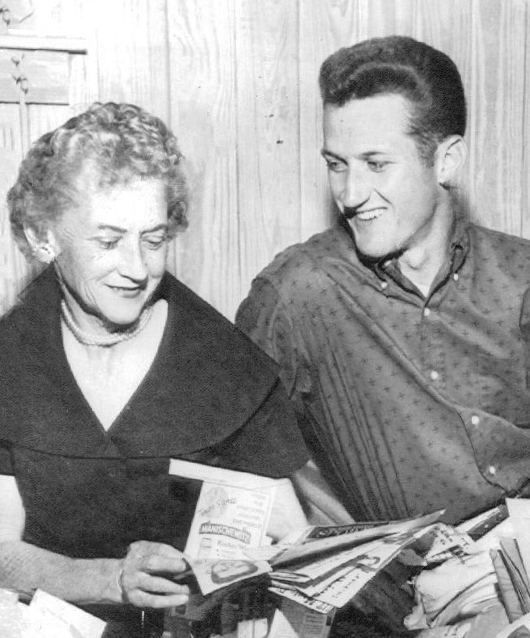
- Arnette with mother in 1960

Personal information
- Born: December 19, 1938 (age 87) Austin, Texas, U.S.
- Listed height: 6 ft 2 in (1.88 m)
- Listed weight: 175 lb (79 kg)

Career information
- High school: McCallum (Austin, Texas)
- College: Texas (1957–1960)
- NBA draft: 1960: 2nd round, 9th overall pick
- Drafted by: Cincinnati Royals
- Playing career: 1963–1965
- Position: Point guard
- Number: 21

Career history
- 1963–1965: Cincinnati Royals

Career highlights
- SWC Player of the Year (1960); First-team All-SWC (1960)

Career statistics
- Points: 424 (3.7 ppg)
- Rebounds: 116 (1.0 rpg)
- Assists: 139 (1.2 apg)
- Stats at NBA.com
- Stats at Basketball Reference
Medals
Men's basketball
Representing United States
Olympic Games
Gold medal – first place	1960 Rome	Team competition

Jay Hoyland Arnette (born December 19, 1938) is an American former professional basketball player. He played college basketball for the Texas Longhorns. Arnette played professionally for the Cincinnati Royals of the NBA from 1963 to 1965.

A 6'2" guard born in Austin, Texas and from Austin's University of Texas, Arnette competed at the 1960 Summer Olympics, where he won a gold medal with the United States men's national basketball team. From 1963 to 1965, he played in the National Basketball Association as a member of the Cincinnati Royals, averaging 3.7 points per game. In 2010, the 1960 United States men's Olympic basketball team on which Arnette played was collectively inducted into the Naismith Memorial Basketball Hall of Fame.

While playing basketball Arnette attended a dental school at Baylor College of Dentistry. He later obtained licenses in dentistry and pharmacy, but practiced orthodontics in Austin, Texas.

== Career statistics ==
Legend
GP	Games played	GS	Games started	MPG	Minutes per game
FG%	Field goal percentage	3P%	3-point field goal percentage	FT%	Free throw percentage
RPG	Rebounds per game	APG	Assists per game	SPG	Steals per game
BPG	Blocks per game	PPG	Points per game	**Bold**	Career high

=== NBA ===
==== Regular season ====
Year	Team	GP	MPG	FG%	FT%	RPG	APG	PPG
1963–64	Cincinnati	48	10.4	.362	**.778**	**1.1**	**1.5**	**3.8**
1964–65	Cincinnati	**63**	**10.5**	**.371**	.747	1.0	1.1	3.8
1965–66	Cincinnati	3	4.7	.167	–	.0	.0	.7
Career		114	10.3	.365	.760	1.0	1.2	3.7

==== Playoffs ====
Year	Team	GP	MPG	FG%	FT%	RPG	APG	PPG
1963–64	Cincinnati	**8**	**9.9**	**.355**	**.875**	**1.3**	**1.1**	**3.6**
1964–65	Cincinnati	1	2.0	.000	–	.0	1.0	.0
Career		9	9.0	.344	.875	1.1	1.1	3.2
