= Lee Shaffer =

American basketball player (born 1939)

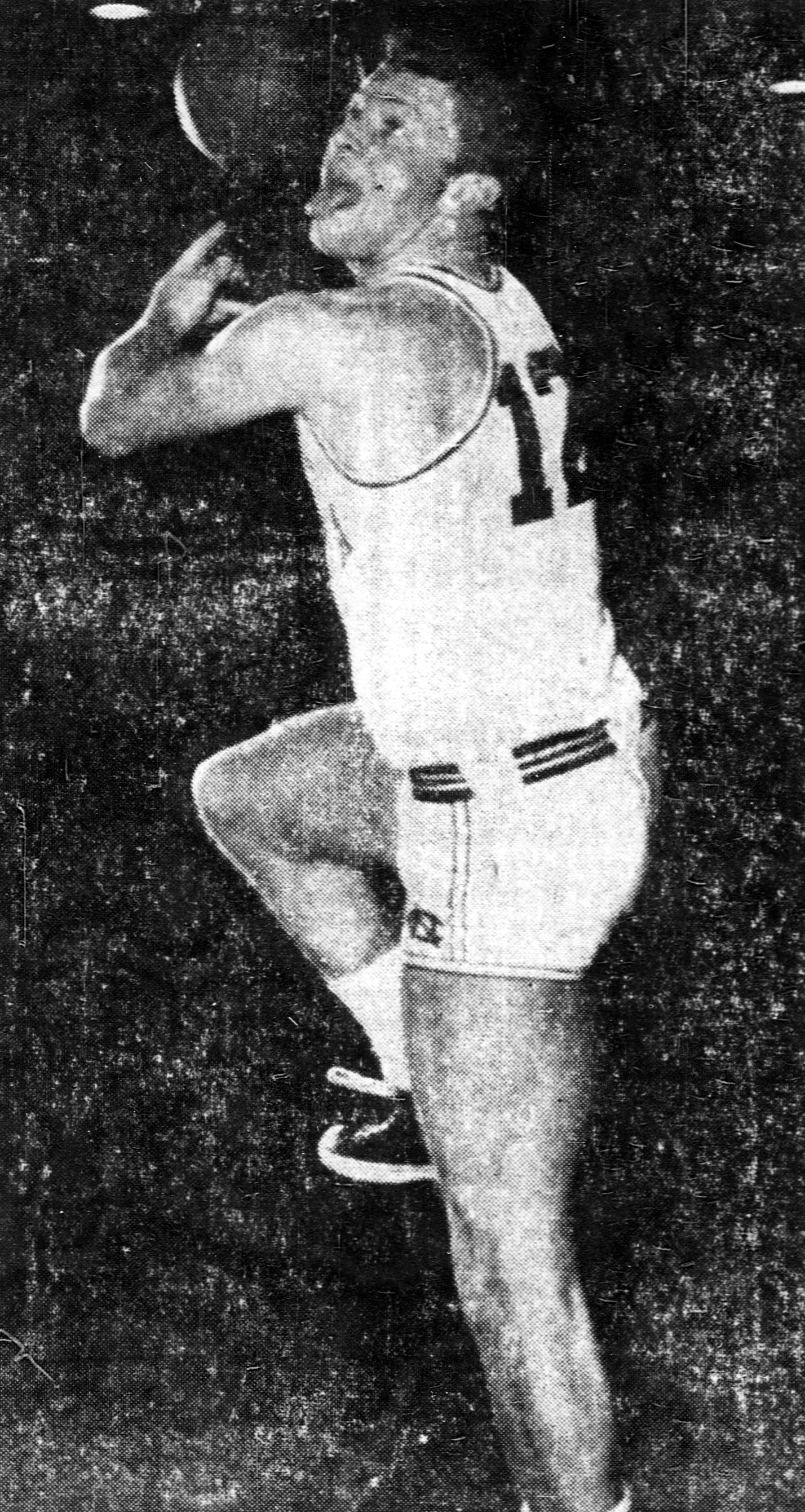
- Shaffer, circa 1960

Personal information
- Born: February 23, 1939 (age 87) Chicago, Illinois, U.S.
- Listed height: 6 ft 7 in (2.01 m)
- Listed weight: 220 lb (100 kg)

Career information
- High school: Baldwin (Pittsburgh, Pennsylvania)
- College: North Carolina (1957–1960)
- NBA draft: 1960: 1st round, 5th overall pick
- Drafted by: Syracuse Nationals
- Playing career: 1961–1964
- Position: Small forward
- Number: 22

Career history
- 1960–1961: Cleveland Pipers
- 1961–1964: Syracuse Nationals / Philadelphia 76ers

Career highlights
- NBA All-Star (1963); Consensus second-team All-American (1960); Third-team All-American – NABC (1959); ACC Player of the Year (1960); First-team All-ACC (1960); Second-team All-ACC (1959)

Career NBA statistics
- Points: 3,291 (16.8 ppg)
- Rebounds: 1,240 (6.3 rpg)
- Assists: 232 (1.2 apg)
- Stats at NBA.com
- Stats at Basketball Reference

Lee Philip Shaffer II (born February 23, 1939) is an American former professional basketball player.

A 6'7" forward born in Chicago, Shaffer starred at the University of North Carolina, where he was the ACC Men's Basketball Player of the Year in 1960.

Shaffer was the #5 selection of the Syracuse Nationals in the 1960 NBA draft, after Naismith Basketball Hall of Fame players Oscar Robertson (#1) and Jerry West (#2). He was selected ahead of future Hall of Famers Lenny Wilkens (#6) and Satch Sanders (#8).

Shaffer and another 1960 First Round Draft choice, Al Bunge (#7), signed with the AAU instead of the NBA, in an era where salaries were small. Shaffer played the 1960–1961 season with the Cleveland Pipers.

He then played three seasons (1961–1964) in the National Basketball Association as a member of the Philadelphia 76ers franchise. An NBA All-Star in 1963, Shaffer held career averages of 16.8 points per game and 6.3 rebounds per game. He retired in 1964 to pursue business opportunities.

== NBA career statistics ==
Legend
GP	Games played	GS	Games started	MPG	Minutes per game
FG%	Field goal percentage	3P%	3-point field goal percentage	FT%	Free throw percentage
RPG	Rebounds per game	APG	Assists per game	SPG	Steals per game
BPG	Blocks per game	PPG	Points per game	**Bold**	Career high

=== Regular season ===
Year	Team	GP	MPG	FG%	FT%	RPG	APG	PPG
1961–62	Syracuse	75	27.8	**.436**	.771	**6.8**	**1.3**	16.9
1962–63	Syracuse	**80**	**29.9**	.429	**.784**	6.6	1.2	**18.6**
1963–64	Philadelphia	41	24.7	.370	.767	5.0	.9	13.1
Career		196	28.0	.420	.776	6.3	1.2	16.8

=== Playoffs ===
Year	Team	GP	MPG	FG%	FT%	RPG	APG	PPG
1962	Syracuse	**5**	**34.8**	.354	.774	**11.0**	**1.4**	18.8
1963	Syracuse	**5**	34.6	**.479**	**.800**	4.6	1.2	**27.2**
1964	Philadelphia	3	13.3	.364	.500	1.3	.7	5.7
Career		13	29.8	.416	.778	6.3	1.2	19.0
