= 1963 NBA playoffs =

Basketball competition

Tournament details
- Dates: March 19–April 24, 1963
- Season: 1962–63
- Teams: 6

Final positions
- Champions: Boston Celtics (6th title)
- Runners-up: Los Angeles Lakers
- Semifinalists: St. Louis Hawks; Cincinnati Royals

Tournament statistics
- Scoring leader(s): Elgin Baylor (Lakers) (32.6 PPG)

The 1963 NBA playoffs were the postseason tournament of the National Basketball Association's 1962-63 season. The tournament concluded with the Eastern Division champion Boston Celtics defeating the Western Division champion Los Angeles Lakers 4 games to 2 in the NBA Finals.

The Celtics won their 5th straight and 6th overall, NBA title. Boston defeated L.A. in the NBA Finals for the second straight year, something that happened regularly in the 1960s.

The Cincinnati Royals advanced to the Division Finals for the first time since 1952, extending the Celtics to seven games.

This was the last playoff appearance for the Syracuse Nationals under that name; they moved to Philadelphia, Pennsylvania the following season and became known as the Philadelphia 76ers.

This was the first time that both Division Finals series went to a deciding Game 7, and will be the last until 1979 and again until 2018.

== Bracket ==
Division Semifinals
E3	Cincinnati	3
E2	Syracuse	2
W3	Detroit	1
W2	St. Louis	3

Division Finals
Eastern Division
E1	Boston*	4
E3	Cincinnati	3
Western Division
W1	Los Angeles*	4
W2	St. Louis	3

NBA Finals
E1	Boston*	4
W1	Los Angeles*	2

- * Division winner
- Bold Series winner
- Italic Team with home-court advantage in NBA Finals

== Division Semifinals ==
=== Eastern Division Semifinals ===
==== (2) Syracuse Nationals vs. (3) Cincinnati Royals ====
March 19

Boxscore

Cincinnati Royals 120, Syracuse Nationals 123
Scoring by quarter: 38–36, 30–34, 23–24, 29–29
Pts: Oscar Robertson 29	Pts: Hal Greer 32
Syracuse leads series, 1–0

Onondaga War Memorial, Syracuse, New York
Attendance: 4,335

March 21

Boxscore

Syracuse Nationals 115, Cincinnati Royals 133
Scoring by quarter: 21–33, 29–29, 31–27, 34–44
Pts: Chet Walker 24	Pts: Oscar Robertson 41
Series tied, 1–1

Cincinnati Gardens, Cincinnati, Ohio
Attendance: 3,205

March 23

Boxscore

Cincinnati Royals 117, Syracuse Nationals 121
Scoring by quarter: 33–31, 20–34, 39–31, 25–25
Pts: Embry, Twyman 24 each	Pts: Lee Shaffer 34
Syracuse leads series, 2–1

Onondaga War Memorial, Syracuse, New York
Attendance: 8,007

March 24

Boxscore

Syracuse Nationals 118, Cincinnati Royals 125
Scoring by quarter: 24–31, 35–29, 32–35, 27–30
Pts: Lee Shaffer 32	Pts: Oscar Robertson 29
Series tied, 2–2

Cincinnati Gardens, Cincinnati, Ohio
Attendance: 3,331

March 26

Boxscore

Cincinnati Royals 131, Syracuse Nationals 127 (OT)
Scoring by quarter: 29–29, 26–31, 28–28, 31–26, Overtime: 17–13
Pts: Oscar Robertson 32	Pts: Lee Shaffer 45
Cincinnati wins series, 3–2

Onondaga War Memorial, Syracuse, New York
Attendance: 7,418

This was the first playoff meeting between these two teams.

=== Western Division Semifinals ===
==== (2) St. Louis Hawks vs. (3) Detroit Pistons ====
March 20

Boxscore

Detroit Pistons 99, St. Louis Hawks 118
Scoring by quarter: 27–15, 32–40, 15–28, 25–35
Pts: Dave DeBusschere 30; Rebs: Dave DeBusschere 18; Asts: Don Ohl 6	Pts: Pettit, Hagan 31 each Rebs: Bob Pettit 15; Asts: Wilkens, Barnhill 6 each
St. Louis leads series, 1–0

Kiel Auditorium, St. Louis, Missouri
Attendance: 5,818

March 22

Boxscore

Detroit Pistons 108, St. Louis Hawks 122
Scoring by quarter: 29–30, 20–24, 30–25, 29–43
Pts: Scott, Ohl 29 each Rebs: Scott, Howell 9 each Asts: Don Ohl 6	Pts: Bob Pettit 42; Rebs: Bob Pettit 18; Asts: Pettit, Farmer 5 each
St. Louis leads series, 2–0

Kiel Auditorium, St. Louis, Missouri

March 24

Boxscore

St. Louis Hawks 103, Detroit Pistons 107
Scoring by quarter: 20–28, 26–27, 26–29, 31–23
Pts: Bob Pettit 36; Rebs: Bob Pettit 22; Asts: Lenny Wilkens 10	Pts: DeBusschere, Ferry 23 each Rebs: Dave DeBusschere 26; Asts: Jones, Ohl 4 each
St. Louis leads series, 2–1

Cobo Arena, Detroit, Michigan
Attendance: 3,232

March 26

Boxscore

St. Louis Hawks 104, Detroit Pistons 100
Scoring by quarter: 25–24, 29–23, 29–27, 21–26
Pts: Bob Pettit 35; Rebs: Bill Bridges 15; Asts: Chico Vaughn 9	Pts: Don Ohl 32; Rebs: Ray Scott 14; Asts: Ray Scott 6
St. Louis wins series, 3–1

Cobo Arena, Detroit, Michigan
Attendance: 3,257

This was the third playoff meeting between these two teams, with both teams splitting the first two meetings.

Previous playoff series
Tied 1–1 in all-time playoff series

1956

Fort Wayne Pistons 3, St. Louis Hawks 2

1956 Western Division Finals

1958

Detroit Pistons 1, St. Louis Hawks 4

1958 Western Division Finals

== Division Finals ==
=== Eastern Division Finals ===
==== (1) Boston Celtics vs. (3) Cincinnati Royals ====
March 28

Boxscore

Cincinnati Royals 135, Boston Celtics 132
Scoring by quarter: 27–36, 35–36, 41–32, 32–28
Pts: Oscar Robertson 43; Rebs: Oscar Robertson 14; Asts: Oscar Robertson 10	Pts: Sam Jones 30; Rebs: Bill Russell 24; Asts: Bob Cousy 9
Cincinnati leads series, 1–0

Boston Garden, Boston, Massachusetts
Attendance: 13,798

March 29

Boxscore

Boston Celtics 125, Cincinnati Royals 102
Scoring by quarter: 30–27, 24–29, 38–23, 33–23
Pts: Bill Russell 26; Rebs: Bill Russell 24	Pts: Oscar Robertson 28; Rebs: Wayne Embry 16
Series tied, 1–1

Cincinnati Gardens, Cincinnati, Ohio
Attendance: 11,102

March 31

Boxscore

Cincinnati Royals 121, Boston Celtics 116
Scoring by quarter: 26–27, 41–35, 26–27, 28–27
Pts: Oscar Robertson 23; Rebs: Bob Boozer 14; Asts: Oscar Robertson 8	Pts: Tom Heinsohn 28; Rebs: Bill Russell 28; Asts: Bob Cousy 7
Cincinnati leads series, 2–1

Boston Garden, Boston, Massachusetts
Attendance: 13,909

April 3

Boxscore

Boston Celtics 128, Cincinnati Royals 110
Scoring by quarter: 34–25, 36–30, 27–31, 31–24
Pts: Bill Russell 26; Rebs: Bill Russell 21	Pts: Oscar Robertson 25; Rebs: Robertson, Embry 15 each
Series tied, 2–2

Cincinnati Gardens, Cincinnati, Ohio
Attendance: 3,498

April 6

Boxscore

Cincinnati Royals 120, Boston Celtics 125
Scoring by quarter: 34–32, 25–33, 27–37, 34–23
Pts: Oscar Robertson 36; Rebs: Wayne Embry 14; Asts: Oscar Robertson 10	Pts: Tom Heinsohn 34; Rebs: Bill Russell 26; Asts: Bob Cousy 8
Boston leads series, 3–2

Boston Garden, Boston, Massachusetts
Attendance: 13,909

April 7

Boxscore

Boston Celtics 99, Cincinnati Royals 109
Scoring by quarter: 25–25, 23–26, 28–34, 23–24
Pts: Sam Jones 22; Rebs: Bill Russell 23	Pts: Oscar Robertson 36; Rebs: Wayne Embry 22
Series tied, 3–3

Cincinnati Gardens, Cincinnati, Ohio
Attendance: 7,745

April 10

Boxscore

Cincinnati Royals 131, Boston Celtics 142
Scoring by quarter: 30–35, 34–33, 29–40, 38–34
Pts: Oscar Robertson 43; Rebs: Embry, Hawkins 7 each Asts: Oscar Robertson 6	Pts: Sam Jones 47; Rebs: Bill Russell 24; Asts: Bob Cousy 16
Boston wins series, 4–3

Boston Garden, Boston, Massachusetts
Attendance: 13,909

This was the first playoff meeting between these two teams.

=== Western Division Finals ===
==== (1) Los Angeles Lakers vs. (2) St. Louis Hawks ====
March 31

Boxscore

St. Louis Hawks 104, Los Angeles Lakers 112
Scoring by quarter: 14–24, 29–21, 27–33, 34–34
Pts: Bob Pettit 38; Rebs: Bob Pettit 14; Asts: Pettit, Barnhill 6 each	Pts: Jerry West 27; Rebs: Elgin Baylor 12; Asts: Elgin Baylor 8
Los Angeles leads series, 1–0

Los Angeles Memorial Sports Arena, Los Angeles, California
Attendance: 10,086

April 2

Boxscore

St. Louis Hawks 99, Los Angeles Lakers 101
Scoring by quarter: 19–24, 29–19, 22–27, 29–31
Pts: Cliff Hagan 34; Rebs: Bob Pettit 16; Asts: Lenny Wilkens 7	Pts: Elgin Baylor 29; Rebs: three players 14 each Asts: Baylor, Selvy 6 each
Los Angeles leads series, 2–0

Los Angeles Memorial Sports Arena, Los Angeles, California
Attendance: 11,225

April 4

Boxscore

Los Angeles Lakers 112, St. Louis Hawks 125
Scoring by quarter: 14–21, 29–29, 33–43, 36–32
Pts: Elgin Baylor 34; Rebs: Elgin Baylor 12; Asts: three players 2 each	Pts: Bob Pettit 33; Rebs: Zelmo Beaty 15; Asts: Lenny Wilkens 10
Los Angeles leads series, 2–1

Kiel Auditorium, St. Louis, Missouri
Attendance: 7,396

April 6

Boxscore

Los Angeles Lakers 114, St. Louis Hawks 124
Scoring by quarter: 28–18, 31–28, 22–45, 33–33
Pts: Jerry West 33; Rebs: Baylor, Ellis 13 each Asts: three players 2 each	Pts: Cliff Hagan 33; Rebs: Bob Pettit 15; Asts: Lenny Wilkens 10
Series tied, 2–2

Kiel Auditorium, St. Louis, Missouri
Attendance: 10,614

April 7

Boxscore

St. Louis Hawks 96, Los Angeles Lakers 123
Scoring by quarter: 15–30, 28–27, 23–39, 30–27
Pts: Chico Vaughn 16; Rebs: Mike Farmer 10	Pts: Elgin Baylor 37; Rebs: Baylor, Wiley 13 each
Los Angeles leads series, 3–2

Los Angeles Memorial Sports Arena, Los Angeles, California
Attendance: 15,212

April 9

Boxscore

Los Angeles Lakers 113, St. Louis Hawks 121
Scoring by quarter: 28–27, 24–33, 29–32, 32–29
Pts: Elgin Baylor 39; Rebs: Rudy LaRusso 11; Asts: Jerry West 4	Pts: Bob Pettit 36; Rebs: Bob Pettit 20; Asts: Lenny Wilkens 11
Series tied, 3–3

Kiel Auditorium, St. Louis, Missouri
Attendance: 8,110

April 11

Boxscore

St. Louis Hawks 100, Los Angeles Lakers 115
Scoring by quarter: 24–30, 26–27, 22–30, 28–28
Pts: Bob Pettit 31; Rebs: Bob Pettit 13; Asts: Cliff Hagan 4	Pts: Elgin Baylor 35; Rebs: Elgin Baylor 15; Asts: Baylor, West 7 each
Los Angeles wins series, 4–3

Los Angeles Memorial Sports Arena, Los Angeles, California
Attendance: 14,864

This was the sixth playoff meeting between these two teams, with the Hawks winning four of the first five meetings.

Previous playoff series
St. Louis leads 4–1 in all-time playoff series

1956

St. Louis Hawks 2, Minneapolis Lakers 1

1956 Western Division Semifinals

1957

St. Louis Hawks 3, Minneapolis Lakers 0

1957 Western Division Finals

1959

St. Louis Hawks 2, Minneapolis Lakers 4

1959 Western Division Finals

1960

St. Louis Hawks 4, Minneapolis Lakers 3

1960 Western Division Finals

1961

St. Louis Hawks 4, Los Angeles Lakers 3

1961 Western Division Finals

== NBA Finals: (E1) Boston Celtics vs. (W1) Los Angeles Lakers ==
April 14

Boxscore

Los Angeles Lakers 114, Boston Celtics 117
Scoring by quarter: 30–21, 24–34, 32–30, 28–32
Pts: Elgin Baylor 33; Rebs: Rudy LaRusso 14; Asts: three players 3 each	Pts: Sam Jones 29; Rebs: Bill Russell 29; Asts: Bob Cousy 11
Boston leads series, 1–0

Boston Garden, Boston, Massachusetts
Attendance: 13,909

April 16

Boxscore

Los Angeles Lakers 106, Boston Celtics 113
Scoring by quarter: 25–19, 21–31, 24–31, 36–32
Pts: Elgin Baylor 30; Rebs: Rudy LaRusso 12; Asts: Elgin Baylor 4	Pts: Sam Jones 27; Rebs: Bill Russell 38; Asts: Bob Cousy 11
Boston leads series, 2–0

Boston Garden, Boston, Massachusetts
Attendance: 13,909

April 17

Boxscore

Boston Celtics 99, Los Angeles Lakers 119
Scoring by quarter: 22–25, 29–30, 29–28, 19–36
Pts: Sam Jones 30; Rebs: Bill Russell 19; Asts: Bill Russell 5	Pts: Jerry West 42; Rebs: Elgin Baylor 23; Asts: Elgin Baylor 8
Boston leads series, 2–1

Los Angeles Memorial Sports Arena, Los Angeles, California
Attendance: 15,493

April 19

Boxscore

Boston Celtics 108, Los Angeles Lakers 105
Scoring by quarter: 31–20, 27–32, 27–18, 23–35
Pts: Tom Heinsohn 35; Rebs: Bill Russell 19; Asts: three players 5 each	Pts: Elgin Baylor 31; Rebs: Elgin Baylor 19; Asts: Jerry West 5
Boston leads series, 3–1

Los Angeles Memorial Sports Arena, Los Angeles, California
Attendance: 16,382

April 21

Boxscore

Los Angeles Lakers 126, Boston Celtics 119
Scoring by quarter: 22–25, 33–27, 35–40, 36–27
Pts: Elgin Baylor 43; Rebs: Elgin Baylor 20; Asts: Jerry West 6	Pts: Sam Jones 36; Rebs: Bill Russell 27; Asts: Bob Cousy 14
Boston leads series, 3–2

Boston Garden, Boston, Massachusetts
Attendance: 13,909

April 24

Boxscore

Boston Celtics 112, Los Angeles Lakers 109
Scoring by quarter: 33–35, 33–17, 26–28, 20–29
Pts: Tom Heinsohn 22; Rebs: Bill Russell 24; Asts: Bill Russell 9	Pts: Jerry West 32; Rebs: Gene Wiley 14; Asts: Jerry West 9
Boston wins series, 4–2

Los Angeles Memorial Sports Arena, Los Angeles, California
Attendance: 15,652

This was the third playoff meeting between these two teams, with the Celtics winning the first two meetings.

Previous playoff series
Boston leads 2–0 in all-time playoff series

1959

Boston Celtics 4, Minneapolis Lakers 0

1959 NBA Finals

1962

Boston Celtics 4, Los Angeles Lakers 3

1962 NBA Finals

== See also ==
- 1963 NBA Finals
- 1962-63 NBA season
