= 1962–63 Boston Celtics season =

NBA basketball team season (NBA champions)

- NBA champions
- Division champions
- Head coach: Red Auerbach
- Arena: Boston Garden

Results
- Record: 58–22 (.725)
- Place: Division: 1st (Eastern)
- Playoff finish: NBA champions (Defeated Lakers 4–2)
- Stats at Basketball Reference

Local media
- Television: WHDH-TV
- Radio: WHDH

The 1962–63 Boston Celtics season was the Celtics' 17th season in the NBA. The Celtics finished the season by winning their sixth NBA Championship. In 2024, HoopsHype would list this squad as the team with the 25th easiest route to an NBA Finals championship due primarily to their first round opponent they faced off against in the Cincinnati Royals.

This would be the last NBA Title for Bob Cousy, who retired after the season.

== Offseason ==
=== NBA draft ===
The 1962 NBA draft results were:

| Round | Pick | Player | Position | Nationality | School/Club team |
|---|---|---|---|---|---|
| 1 | 7 | John Havlicek | Forward/Guard | United States | Ohio State |
| 2 | 16 | Jack Foley | Guard | United States | Holy Cross |
| 3 | 25 | Jim Hadnot | | United States | Providence |
| 4 | 34 | Roger Strickland | | United States | Jacksonville University |
| 5 | 43 | Gary Daniels | | United States | The Citadel |
| 6 | 52 | Jim Hooley | | | Boston College |
| 7 | 60 | Clyde Arnold | | | Duquesne |
| 8 | 69 | Chuck Chevalier | | | Boston College |
| 9 | 78 | Mike Cingiser | | | Brown |

== Roster ==
1962–63 Boston Celtics roster
Players

| Pos. | No. | Player | Height | Weight | DOB | From |
|---|---|---|---|---|---|---|
| G | 14 | Bob Cousy | 6 ft 1 in (1.85 m) | 175 lb (79 kg) | | Holy Cross |
| F | 20 | Gene Guarilia | 6 ft 5 in (1.96 m) | 220 lb (100 kg) | | George Washington |
| G/F | 17 | John Havlicek | 6 ft 5 in (1.96 m) | 203 lb (92 kg) | | Ohio State |
| F | 15 | Tom Heinsohn | 6 ft 7 in (2.01 m) | 218 lb (99 kg) | | Holy Cross |
| G | 25 | K. C. Jones | 6 ft 1 in (1.85 m) | 200 lb (91 kg) | | San Francisco |
| G/F | 24 | Sam Jones | 6 ft 4 in (1.93 m) | 198 lb (90 kg) | | North Carolina Central |
| SF | 18 | Jim Loscutoff | 6 ft 5 in (1.96 m) | 220 lb (100 kg) | | Oregon |
| C | 4 | Clyde Lovellette | 6 ft 9 in (2.06 m) | 234 lb (106 kg) | | Kansas |
| F | 12 | Willie Naulls | 6 ft 6 in (1.98 m) | 225 lb (102 kg) | | UCLA |
| C | 6 | Bill Russell | 6 ft 10 in (2.08 m) | 215 lb (98 kg) | | San Francisco |
| F | 16 | Satch Sanders | 6 ft 6 in (1.98 m) | 210 lb (95 kg) | | NYU |
| G/F | 23 | Frank Ramsey | 6 ft 3 in (1.91 m) | 190 lb (86 kg) | | Kentucky |

Coaches
Head coach
- Red Auerbach

Legend
- (DP) Unsigned draft pick
- (FA) Free agent
- (S) Suspended
- Injured

== Regular season ==
=== Season standings ===
| Eastern Division | W | L | PCT | GB | Home | Road | Neutral | Div |
|---|---|---|---|---|---|---|---|---|
| x-Boston Celtics | 58 | 22 | .725 | – | 25–5 | 21–16 | 12–1 | 25–11 |
| x-Syracuse Nationals | 48 | 32 | .600 | 10 | 23–5 | 13–19 | 12–8 | 21–15 |
| x-Cincinnati Royals | 42 | 38 | .525 | 16 | 23–10 | 15–19 | 4–9 | 20–16 |
| New York Knicks | 21 | 59 | .263 | 37 | 12–22 | 5–28 | 4–9 | 6–30 |

=== Game log ===
1962–63 game log
| # | Date | Opponent | Score | High points | Record |
| 1 | October 20 | New York | W 149–116 | Sam Jones (25) | 1–0 |
| 2 | October 26 | @ New York | W 133–108 | Bill Russell (25) | 2–0 |
| 3 | October 27 | Syracuse | W 118–98 | Heinsohn, S. Jones, Sanders (17) | 3–0 |
| 4 | October 30 | @ St. Louis | L 97–98 | Sam Jones (23) | 3–1 |
| 5 | October 31 | @ Detroit | W 115–100 | Tom Heinsohn (24) | 4–1 |
| 6 | November 2 | @ Chicago | W 107–97 | Bob Cousy (23) | 5–1 |
| 7 | November 3 | Detroit | W 125–114 | Tom Heinsohn (21) | 6–1 |
| 8 | November 7 | @ Cincinnati | W 106–105 | Sam Jones (23) | 7–1 |
| 9 | November 9 | Los Angeles | L 120–133 | Sam Jones (23) | 7–2 |
| 10 | November 11 | vs. New York | W 117–98 | Tom Heinsohn (24) | 8–2 |
| 11 | November 12 | Cincinnati | W 137–126 | Tom Heinsohn (25) | 9–2 |
| 12 | November 13 | @ New York | W 116–102 | Tom Heinsohn (26) | 10–2 |
| 13 | November 16 | @ Syracuse | L 105–113 | Tom Heinsohn (27) | 10–3 |
| 14 | November 17 | San Francisco | W 127–109 | Tom Heinsohn (28) | 11–3 |
| 15 | November 20 | vs. Chicago | W 113–106 | Heinsohn, Russell (20) | 12–3 |
| 16 | November 21 | St. Louis | W 115–106 | Bill Russell (26) | 13–3 |
| 17 | November 22 | vs. Syracuse | L 120–130 | Frank Ramsey (23) | 13–4 |
| 18 | November 23 | vs. Chicago | W 116–104 | Satch Sanders (27) | 14–4 |
| 19 | November 24 | @ St. Louis | L 95–97 | Satch Sanders (21) | 14–5 |
| 20 | November 27 | vs. Detroit | W 125–115 | Tom Heinsohn (24) | 15–5 |
| 21 | December 1 | Syracuse | W 129–110 | Heinsohn, S. Jones, Russell (22) | 16–5 |
| 22 | December 2 | @ Cincinnati | W 128–127 (OT) | Sam Jones (27) | 17–5 |
| 23 | December 5 | @ Detroit | W 106–93 | Sam Jones (20) | 18–5 |
| 24 | December 7 | Los Angeles | W 126–112 | Bill Russell (24) | 19–5 |
| 25 | December 8 | @ Syracuse | L 97–102 | Tom Heinsohn (20) | 19–6 |
| 26 | December 11 | @ New York | L 87–95 | Bill Russell (18) | 19–7 |
| 27 | December 12 | St. Louis | W 111–98 | Sam Jones (27) | 20–7 |
| 28 | December 13 | vs. Detroit | W 103–93 | Tom Heinsohn (26) | 21–7 |
| 29 | December 15 | Cincinnati | L 120–124 | Bill Russell (23) | 21–8 |
| 30 | December 22 | New York | L 106–120 | Sam Jones (24) | 21–9 |
| 31 | December 26 | San Francisco | W 116–113 | Sam Jones (20) | 22–9 |
| 32 | December 27 | vs. San Francisco | W 108–102 | Sam Jones (32) | 23–9 |
| 33 | December 28 | @ Cincinnati | W 121–113 | John Havlicek (31) | 24–9 |
| 34 | December 29 | @ St. Louis | L 100–102 | Tom Heinsohn (23) | 24–10 |
| 35 | January 2 | @ San Francisco | W 135–120 (OT) | Tom Heinsohn (41) | 25–10 |
| 36 | January 4 | @ Los Angeles | L 123–125 | Tom Heinsohn (29) | 25–11 |
| 37 | January 5 | @ Los Angeles | L 104–106 | John Havlicek (24) | 25–12 |
| 38 | January 8 | @ San Francisco | W 118–112 | Bob Cousy (19) | 26–12 |
| 39 | January 9 | @ Chicago | L 123–131 | John Havlicek (20) | 26–13 |
| 40 | January 10 | @ Cincinnati | L 121–130 | Bill Russell (31) | 26–14 |
| 41 | January 11 | Syracuse | W 134–117 | John Havlicek (27) | 27–14 |
| 42 | January 13 | Chicago | W 143–99 | Clyde Lovellette (24) | 28–14 |
| 43 | January 17 | vs. Chicago | W 110–93 | Tom Heinsohn (18) | 29–14 |
| 44 | January 18 | Cincinnati | W 122–114 | Tom Heinsohn (25) | 30–14 |
| 45 | January 19 | @ Syracuse | W 149–148 (OT) | Sam Jones (37) | 30–15 |
| 46 | January 20 | Los Angeles | W 133–121 | S. Jones, Russell (29) | 31–15 |
| 47 | January 22 | @ New York | W 124–100 | Bob Cousy (19) | 32–15 |
| 48 | January 23 | @ Cincinnati | L 133–138 | Tom Heinsohn (25) | 32–16 |
| 49 | January 24 | vs. St. Louis | W 111–109 | Sam Jones (27) | 33–16 |
| 50 | January 25 | St. Louis | W 113–98 | Sam Jones (21) | 34–16 |
| 51 | January 27 | New York | W 123–110 | John Havlicek (26) | 35–16 |
| 52 | January 29 | vs. Chicago | W 100–99 | Sam Jones (23) | 36–16 |
| 53 | January 30 | San Francisco | W 125–111 | Bill Russell (23) | 37–16 |
| 54 | January 31 | vs. Cincinnati | W 128–125 | Sam Jones (22) | 38–16 |
| 55 | February 1 | Syracuse | L 111–125 | Satch Sanders (22) | 38–17 |
| 56 | February 3 | Detroit | W 137–128 | Sam Jones (35) | 39–17 |
| 57 | February 5 | @ Cincinnati | W 106–96 | Sam Jones (27) | 40–17 |
| 58 | February 6 | @ Syracuse | L 109–126 | Sam Jones (22) | 40–18 |
| 59 | February 8 | @ New York | W 129–97 | John Havlicek (19) | 41–18 |
| 60 | February 9 | San Francisco | W 118–112 | Cousy, S. Jones (22) | 42–18 |
| 61 | February 10 | New York | W 129–123 | Sam Jones (21) | 43–18 |
| 62 | February 12 | vs. Los Angeles | W 120–93 | Sam Jones (25) | 44–18 |
| 63 | February 13 | Los Angeles | L 128–134 | Satch Sanders (25) | 44–19 |
| 64 | February 15 | vs. Syracuse | W 123–114 | Tom Heinsohn (33) | 45–19 |
| 65 | February 16 | @ St. Louis | W 114–94 | Sam Jones (34) | 46–19 |
| 66 | February 17 | @ Chicago | W 110–107 | Sam Jones (28) | 47–19 |
| 67 | February 19 | Cincinnati | W 126–129 | Heinsohn, S. Jones (25) | 48–19 |
| 68 | February 20 | @ Detroit | W 117–113 | John Havlicek (24) | 49–19 |
| 69 | February 21 | @ San Francisco | W 135–118 | Bill Russell (25) | 50–19 |
| 70 | February 22 | @ Los Angeles | L 105–113 | Sam Jones (24) | 50–20 |
| 71 | February 24 | @ Los Angeles | W 119–109 | Sam Jones (28) | 51–20 |
| 72 | February 26 | @ San Francisco | L 112–128 | Bill Russell (20) | 51–21 |
| 73 | March 2 | New York | W 122–117 | John Havlicek (32) | 52–21 |
| 74 | March 3 | @ New York | W 102–95 | Sam Jones (17) | 53–21 |
| 75 | March 7 | @ Detroit | W 115–104 | Sam Jones (31) | 54–21 |
| 76 | March 8 | @ Chicago | L 109–110 | Bill Russell (24) | 54–22 |
| 77 | March 10 | Cincinnati | W 149–117 | Tom Heinsohn (29) | 55–22 |
| 78 | March 13 | Chicago | W 121–108 | Tom Heinsohn (37) | 56–22 |
| 79 | March 16 | @ Syracuse | W 125–121 | Tom Heinsohn (21) | 57–22 |
| 80 | March 17 | Syracuse | W 125–116 | Tom Heinsohn (28) | 58–22 |

== Player stats ==
Note: GP= Games played; REB= Rebounds; AST= Assists; STL = Steals; BLK = Blocks; PTS = Points; AVG = Average

| Player | GP | REB | AST | STL | BLK | PTS | AVG |
|---|---|---|---|---|---|---|---|
| Sam Jones | 76 | 396 | 241 | 0 | 0 | 1499 | 19.7 |
| Tom Heinsohn | 76 | 596 | 95 | 0 | 0 | 1440 | 18.9 |
| Bill Russell | 78 | 1843 | 348 | 0 | 0 | 1309 | 16.8 |
| John Havlicek | 80 | 534 | 179 | 0 | 0 | 1140 | 14.3 |
| Bob Cousy | 76 | 193 | 515 | 0 | 0 | 1003 | 13.2 |
| Frank Ramsey | 77 | 288 | 95 | 0 | 0 | 839 | 10.9 |
| Thomas "Satch" Sanders | 80 | 576 | 95 | 0 | 0 | 864 | 10.8 |
| K.C. Jones | 79 | 263 | 317 | 0 | 0 | 572 | 7.2 |
| Clyde Lovellette | 61 | 177 | 27 | 0 | 0 | 395 | 6.5 |
| Dan Swartz | 39 | 88 | 21 | 0 | 0 | 175 | 4.5 |
| Jim Loscutoff | 63 | 157 | 25 | 0 | 0 | 210 | 3.3 |
| Gene Guarilia | 11 | 14 | 2 | 0 | 0 | 26 | 2.4 |

== Playoffs ==
1963 playoff game log
Division Finals: 4–3 (home: 2–2; road: 2–1)

| Game | Date | Team | Score | High points | High rebounds | High assists | Location Attendance | Series |
|---|---|---|---|---|---|---|---|---|
| 1 | March 28 | Cincinnati | L 132–135 | Sam Jones (30) | Bill Russell (24) | Bob Cousy (9) | Boston Garden; 13,798 | 1–0 |
| 2 | March 29 | @ Cincinnati | W 125–102 | Bill Russell (26) | Bill Russell (24) | — | Cincinnati Gardens; 11,102 | 1–1 |
| 3 | March 31 | Cincinnati | L 116–121 | Tom Heinsohn (28) | Bill Russell (28) | Bob Cousy (7) | Boston Garden; 13,909 | 1–2 |
| 4 | April 3 | @ Cincinnati | W 128–110 | Bill Russell (26) | Bill Russell (21) | — | Cincinnati Gardens; 3,498 | 2–2 |
| 5 | April 6 | Cincinnati | W 125–120 | Tom Heinsohn (34) | Bill Russell (26) | Bob Cousy (8) | Boston Garden; 13,909 | 3–2 |
| 6 | April 7 | @ Cincinnati | L 99–109 | Sam Jones (22) | Bill Russell (23) | — | Cincinnati Gardens; 7,745 | 3–3 |
| 7 | April 10 | Cincinnati | W 142–131 | Sam Jones (47) | Bill Russell (24) | Bob Cousy (16) | Boston Garden; 13,909 | 4–3 |

NBA Finals: 4–2 (home: 2–1; road: 2–1)

| Game | Date | Team | Score | High points | High rebounds | High assists | Location Attendance | Series |
|---|---|---|---|---|---|---|---|---|
| 1 | April 14 | Los Angeles | W 117–114 | Sam Jones (29) | Bill Russell (29) | Bob Cousy (11) | Boston Garden; 13,909 | 1–0 |
| 2 | April 16 | Los Angeles | W 113–106 | Sam Jones (27) | Bill Russell (38) | Bob Cousy (11) | Boston Garden; 13,909 | 2–0 |
| 3 | April 17 | @ Los Angeles | L 99–119 | Sam Jones (30) | Bill Russell (19) | Bill Russell (5) | Los Angeles Memorial Sports Arena; 15,493 | 2–1 |
| 4 | April 19 | @ Los Angeles | W 108–105 | Tom Heinsohn (35) | Bill Russell (19) | three players tied (5) | Los Angeles Memorial Sports Arena; 16,382 | 3–1 |
| 5 | April 21 | Los Angeles | L 119–126 | Sam Jones (36) | Bill Russell (27) | Bob Cousy (14) | Boston Garden; 13,909 | 3–2 |
| 6 | April 24 | @ Los Angeles | W 112–109 | Tom Heinsohn (22) | Bill Russell (24) | Bill Russell (9) | Los Angeles Memorial Sports Arena; 15,652 | 4–2 |

1963 schedule

== Awards and honors ==
- Bill Russell, NBA Most Valuable Player Award
- Bill Russell, All-NBA First Team
- Bob Cousy, All-NBA Second Team
- Tom Heinsohn, All-NBA Second Team
- John Havlicek, NBA All-Rookie Team 1st Team
- Nine players are enshrined in the Naismith Memorial Basketball Hall of Fame.
