= 1962–63 Cincinnati Royals season =

NBA professional basketball team season

- Head coach: Charles Wolf
- Owners: Thomas E. Woods estate Louis Jacobs
- Arena: Cincinnati Gardens

Results
- Record: 42–38 (.525)
- Place: Division: 3rd (Eastern)
- Playoff finish: Division finals (lost to Celtics 3–4)

Local media
- Television: WKRC-TV
- Radio: WKRC

The 1962–63 Cincinnati Royals season was the team's 15th season in the National Basketball Association (NBA) and its sixth in Cincinnati. The Royals were shifted from the Western Division into the Eastern Division before the start of the season because the Philadelphia Warriors had relocated to San Francisco. In their first season in the Eastern Division, the Royals posted a 42–38 record and finished in 3rd place. The season saw the Royals challenged by a rival league, the American Basketball League run by Abe Saperstein, like few NBA teams ever have been. Larry Staverman and Win Wilfong had left the team for the new league. #1 draft picks Larry Siegfried and Jerry Lucas were both also signed away by the ABL. These key losses would later greatly affect the team's playoffs result. Lucas was particularly missed by Cincinnati fans. Oscar Robertson nonetheless led a balanced and solid Royals five that year, supported by Wayne Embry, Jack Twyman, Bob Boozer and Arlen Bockhorn. Draft pick Adrian Smith had arrived and joined Tom Hawkins and Hub Reed at the head of the bench. Robertson posted 28.3 points per game, and his league-leading assists total was twice that of all but one other NBA player. He sank the second-most free throws in the league, and was a strong third on the Royals in rebounds.

The Royals were consistent winners all season long, buoyed by a 10–6 November.

In the playoffs, the Royals would win their first playoff series in 11 years. The Royals upset the second-place Syracuse Nationals with an overtime win on the road in Game 5 on March 26. The two teams had each won their two home games before Robertson led the upset. It was the last NBA game ever hosted by a team in Syracuse, New York. In the Eastern Finals, the Royals faced the defending NBA Champion Boston Celtics and stunned them with two wins at Boston Gardens to seize a 2–1 series lead. Thomas E. Wood, the team's key owner, died in 1961. An ownership dispute between competing groups came to a head in 1963 when Louis Jacobs, who had bought Cincinnati Gardens from the Wood estate, scheduled a circus for the week of the Boston series without telling the Royals. The team was furious and had to host their second home playoff game at Xavier University's small Schmidt Fieldhouse. Despite that fact, and the earlier loss of draft pick Jerry Lucas, Robertson led the team to a third win over the Celtics in Game Six to force a seventh game. The Royals lost Game Seven in Boston on April 10, 142–131. Robertson had 43 points, the Celtics' Sam Jones had 47 in that concluding game. The season marks arguably the closest the Cincinnati Royals ever came to an NBA title, despite the obstacles mentioned above.

Ballyhooed #1 pick Jerry Lucas, two-time NCAA Player of The Year, was signed away by George Steinbrenner of the ABL Cleveland Pipers, a serious blow to this year's team.

1. 2 pick was 6' 8 Bud Olsen of Louisville, a college star with local ties.

== Roster ==
1962–63 Cincinnati Royals roster
Players

Pos.	No.	Player	Height	Weight	DOB	From
SG	11	Arlen Bockhorn	6 ft 4 in (1.93 m)	200 lb (91 kg)	1933–07–08	Dayton
PF	13	Bob Boozer	6 ft 8 in (2.03 m)	215 lb (98 kg)	1937–04–26	Kansas State
PF	21	Joe Buckhalter	6 ft 7 in (2.01 m)	210 lb (95 kg)	1937–08–01	Tennessee State
C	15	Wayne Embry	6 ft 8 in (2.03 m)	240 lb (109 kg)	1937–03–26	Miami (OH)
SF	19	Tom Hawkins	6 ft 5 in (1.96 m)	210 lb (95 kg)	1936–12–22	Notre Dame
PF	16	Bud Olsen	6 ft 8 in (2.03 m)	220 lb (100 kg)	1940–07–25	Louisville
SF	61	Dave Piontek	6 ft 6 in (1.98 m)	230 lb (104 kg)	1937–08–27	Xavier
C	51	Hub Reed	6 ft 9 in (2.06 m)	215 lb (98 kg)	1936–10–04	Oklahoma City
PG	14	Oscar Robertson	6 ft 5 in (1.96 m)	205 lb (93 kg)	1938–11–24	Cincinnati
SG	10	Adrian Smith	6 ft 1 in (1.85 m)	180 lb (82 kg)	1936–10–05	Kentucky
PG	41	Dan Tieman	6 ft 0 in (1.83 m)	185 lb (84 kg)	1940–11–30	Thomas More
SF	31	Jack Twyman	6 ft 6 in (1.98 m)	210 lb (95 kg)	1934–05–11	Cincinnati

Coaches
Head coach
- Charles Wolf

Legend
- (DP) Unsigned draft pick
- (FA) Free agent
- (S) Suspended
- Injured

Roster

== Regular season ==
=== Season standings ===
Eastern Division	W	L	PCT	GB	Home	Road	Neutral	Div
x-Boston Celtics	58	22	.725	–	25–5	21–16	12–1	25–11
x-Syracuse Nationals	48	32	.600	10	23–5	13–19	12–8	21–15
x-Cincinnati Royals	42	38	.525	16	23–10	15–19	4–9	20–16
New York Knicks	21	59	.263	37	12–22	5–28	4–9	6–30

=== Season schedule ===
1962–63 game log
#	Date	Opponent	Score	High points	Record
1	October 20	@ Chicago	L 109–113	Oscar Robertson (29)	0–1
2	October 23	Los Angeles	W 116–115	Oscar Robertson (32)	1–1
3	October 24	@ St. Louis	L 114–121	Oscar Robertson (31)	1–2
4	October 26	St. Louis	W 118–102	Oscar Robertson (27)	2–2
5	October 28	San Francisco	W 131–130 (OT)	Oscar Robertson (36)	3–2
6	November 3	@ Syracuse	L 111–130	Robertson, Twyman (22)	3–3
7	November 7	Boston	L 105–106	Oscar Robertson (42)	3–4
8	November 8	@ Detroit	L 114–116	Oscar Robertson (38)	3–5
9	November 9	@ New York	W 122–119	Oscar Robertson (37)	4–5
10	November 10	Detroit	W 135–124	Oscar Robertson (32)	5–5
11	November 12	@ Boston	L 126–137	Robertson, Twyman (26)	5–6
12	November 13	vs. Detroit	W 127–109	Oscar Robertson (31)	6–6
13	November 14	Syracuse	W 120–125	Oscar Robertson (33)	7–6
14	November 16	St. Louis	W 120–111	Jack Twyman (27)	8–6
15	November 18	San Francisco	W 132–120	Robertson, Twyman (32)	9–6
16	November 21	@ San Francisco	W 143–139	Oscar Robertson (40)	10–6
17	November 22	@ Los Angeles	L 110–134	Oscar Robertson (21)	10–7
18	November 24	@ Los Angeles	L 123–129	Wayne Embry (34)	10–8
19	November 25	@ San Francisco	W 128–115	Jack Twyman (27)	11–8
20	November 27	@ New York	W 139–129	Oscar Robertson (31)	12–8
21	November 30	Syracuse	W 130–117	Oscar Robertson (31)	13–8
22	December 1	@ Chicago	W 131–121	Oscar Robertson (30)	14–8
23	December 2	Boston	L 127–128 (OT)	Robertson, Twyman (29)	14–9
24	December 6	New York	L 96–99	Jack Twyman (24)	14–10
25	December 8	Los Angeles	L 128–131 (OT)	Oscar Robertson (42)	14–11
26	December 11	vs. Los Angeles	L 121–124	Oscar Robertson (31)	14–12
27	December 12	vs. Chicago	L 102–105	Adrian Smith (17)	14–13
28	December 13	vs. Chicago	W 142–123	Jack Twyman (32)	15–13
29	December 15	@ Boston	W 124–120	Oscar Robertson (26)	16–13
30	December 18	@ New York	L 102–103	Oscar Robertson (28)	16–14
31	December 19	Syracuse	W 120–129	Oscar Robertson (32)	17–14
32	December 21	Chicago	W 129–116	Oscar Robertson (30)	18–14
33	December 25	Detroit	W 131–120	Oscar Robertson (35)	19–14
34	December 28	Boston	L 113–121	Oscar Robertson (35)	19–15
35	December 29	@ Chicago	L 104–108	Wayne Embry (25)	19–16
36	January 1	New York	W 112–106 (OT)	Oscar Robertson (32)	20–16
37	January 2	@ Detroit	L 118–138	Wayne Embry (23)	20–17
38	January 4	San Francisco	W 130–129	Jack Twyman (35)	21–17
39	January 5	vs. Syracuse	L 117–136	Oscar Robertson (35)	21–18
40	January 6	Los Angeles	L 119–120 (OT)	Oscar Robertson (33)	21–19
41	January 8	vs. Syracuse	L 116–119	Jack Twyman (35)	21–20
42	January 9	@ Syracuse	W 116–112	Oscar Robertson (29)	22–20
43	January 10	Boston	W 130–121	Oscar Robertson (41)	23–20
44	January 12	@ St. Louis	L 109–115	Oscar Robertson (25)	23–21
45	January 13	St. Louis	L 104–105	Oscar Robertson (31)	23–22
46	January 18	@ Boston	L 114–122	Oscar Robertson (33)	23–23
47	January 19	New York	W 114–108	Oscar Robertson (26)	24–23
48	January 20	@ Chicago	L 93–113	Embry, Robertson (18)	24–24
49	January 23	Boston	W 138–133	Oscar Robertson (43)	25–24
50	January 25	@ New York	W 114–112	Jack Twyman (25)	26–24
51	January 26	Chicago	W 142–116	Oscar Robertson (24)	27–24
52	January 27	vs. Chicago	W 143–126	Oscar Robertson (31)	28–24
53	January 31	vs. Boston	L 125–128	Jack Twyman (32)	28–25
54	February 1	vs. San Francisco	L 126–133	Oscar Robertson (25)	28–26
55	February 2	vs. Syracuse	L 113–117	Jack Twyman (25)	28–27
56	February 3	@ Syracuse	W 125–115	Oscar Robertson (26)	29–27
57	February 5	Boston	L 96–106	Oscar Robertson (22)	29–28
58	February 7	San Francisco	W 134–129	Oscar Robertson (33)	30–28
59	February 8	@ St. Louis	W 116–112	Wayne Embry (23)	31–28
60	February 10	Los Angeles	W 124–107	Oscar Robertson (29)	32–28
61	February 13	vs. Syracuse	W 124–122	Oscar Robertson (34)	33–28
62	February 15	St. Louis	L 96–99	Oscar Robertson (23)	33–29
63	February 16	@ Detroit	W 110–99	Wayne Embry (27)	34–29
64	February 17	@ New York	W 109–98	Jack Twyman (27)	35–29
65	February 19	@ Boston	L 126–129	Oscar Robertson (35)	35–30
66	February 20	@ Syracuse	109–128	Jack Twyman (27)	35–31
67	February 21	New York	W 115–96	Oscar Robertson (25)	36–31
68	February 23	Detroit	L 102–105	Oscar Robertson (24)	36–32
69	February 24	vs. Detroit	L 110–119	Oscar Robertson (36)	36–33
70	February 26	@ St. Louis	L 107–114	Oscar Robertson (30)	36–34
71	February 27	New York	W 119–107	Oscar Robertson (30)	37–34
72	March 1	vs. San Francisco	L 125–132	Oscar Robertson (32)	37–35
73	March 3	@ San Francisco	L 122–123	Jack Twyman (27)	37–36
74	March 4	@ Los Angeles	W 114–111	Jack Twyman (24)	38–36
75	March 6	@ Los Angeles	L 97–106	Oscar Robertson (26)	38–37
76	March 10	@ Boston	L 117–149	Oscar Robertson (23)	38–38
77	March 12	@ New York	W 110–96	Bob Boozer (21)	39–38
78	March 13	Syracuse	W 128–114	Oscar Robertson (35)	40–38
79	March 16	@ Chicago	W 126–117	Oscar Robertson (24)	41–38
80	March 17	New York	W 116–109	Oscar Robertson (34)	42–38

The Royals won five straight to move to 10–6 in November, and followed that with a 6–8 December. They were 9–9 in both January and February, reaching 36–31 on 2–21–63. The Royals won four straight to finish the season 42–38.

== Playoffs ==
1963 playoff game log
Division Semi-finals: 3–2 (home: 2–0; road: 1–2)

Game	Date	Team	Score	High points	Location Attendance	Series
1	March 19	@ Syracuse	L 120–123	Oscar Robertson (29)	Onondaga War Memorial; 4,335	0–1
2	March 21	Syracuse	W 133–115	Oscar Robertson (41)	Cincinnati Gardens; 3,205	1–1
3	March 23	@ Syracuse	L 117–121	Embry, Twyman (24)	Onondaga War Memorial; 8,007	1–2
4	March 24	Syracuse	W 125–118	Oscar Robertson (29)	Cincinnati Gardens; 3,331	2–2
5	March 26	@ Syracuse	W 131–127 (OT)	Oscar Robertson (32)	Onondaga War Memorial; 7,418	3–2

Division finals: 3–4 (home: 1–2; road: 2–2)

Game	Date	Team	Score	High points	High rebounds	High assists	Location Attendance	Series
1	March 28	@ Boston	W 135–132	Oscar Robertson (43)	Oscar Robertson (14)	Oscar Robertson (10)	Boston Garden; 13,798	0–1
2	March 29	Boston	L 102–125	Oscar Robertson (28)	Wayne Embry (16)	—	Cincinnati Gardens; 11,102	1–1
3	March 31	@ Boston	W 121–116	Oscar Robertson (23)	Bob Boozer (14)	Oscar Robertson (8)	Boston Garden; 13,909	2–1
4	April 3	Boston	L 110–128	Oscar Robertson (25)	Robertson, Embry (15)	—	Cincinnati Gardens; 3,498	2–2
5	April 6	@ Boston	L 120–125	Oscar Robertson (36)	Wayne Embry (14)	Oscar Robertson (10)	Boston Garden; 13,909	2–3
6	April 7	Boston	W 109–99	Oscar Robertson (36)	Wayne Embry (22)	—	Cincinnati Gardens; 7,745	3–3
7	April 10	@ Boston	L 131–142	Oscar Robertson (43)	Embry, Hawkins (7)	Oscar Robertson (6)	Boston Garden; 13,909	3–4

1963 schedule

== Player statistics ==
Legend
GP	Games played	GS	Games started	MPG	Minutes per game
FG%	Field-goal percentage	3P%	3-point field-goal percentage	FT%	Free-throw percentage
RPG	Rebounds per game	APG	Assists per game	SPG	Steals per game
BPG	Blocks per game	PPG	Points per game

=== Season ===
Player	GP	GS	MPG	FG%	3FG%	FT%	RPG	APG	SPG	BPG	PPG
Arlen Bockhorn											
Bob Boozer											
Joe Buckhalter											
Wayne Embry											
Tom Hawkins											
Bud Olsen											
Dave Piontek											
Hub Reed											
Oscar Robertson											
Adrian Smith											
Dan Tieman											
Jack Twyman											

=== Playoffs ===
Player	GP	GS	MPG	FG%	3FG%	FT%	RPG	APG	SPG	BPG	PPG
Arlen Bockhorn											
Bob Boozer											
Wayne Embry											
Tom Hawkins											
Bud Olsen											
Dave Piontek											
Hub Reed											
Oscar Robertson											
Adrian Smith											
Jack Twyman											

== Awards and honors ==
- Oscar Robertson, First Team All-NBA selection, NBA All-Star
- Wayne Embry, NBA All-Star
- Jack Twyman, NBA All-Star
