= 1963 NBA Finals =

1963 basketball championship series

| Team | Coach | Wins |
|---|---|---|
| Boston Celtics | Red Auerbach | 4 |
| Los Angeles Lakers | Fred Schaus | 2 |
- Dates: April 14–24
- Hall of Famers: Celtics: Bob Cousy (1971); John Havlicek (1984); Tom Heinsohn (1986 as player, 2015 as coach); K. C. Jones (1989); Sam Jones (1984); Clyde Lovellette (1988); Frank Ramsey (1982); Bill Russell (1975); Satch Sanders (2011, contributor); Lakers: Dick Barnett (2024); Elgin Baylor (1977); Jerry West (1980); Coaches: Red Auerbach (1969); Officials: Mendy Rudolph (2007); Earl Strom (1995)
- Eastern finals: Celtics defeated Royals, 4–3
- Western finals: Lakers defeated Hawks, 4–3

The 1963 NBA World Championship Series was the championship round of the 1963 NBA playoffs, which concluded the National Basketball Association 1962–63 season. The best-of-seven series was played between the Western Division champion Los Angeles Lakers and the Eastern Division champion Boston Celtics. This was the Celtics' seventh straight trip to the championship series, and they won the series over the Lakers, 4–2 to win their sixth title overall.

== Series summary ==
| Game | Date | Home team | Result | Road team |
|---|---|---|---|---|
| Game 1 | April 14 | Boston Celtics | 117–114 (1–0) | Los Angeles Lakers |
| Game 2 | April 16 | Boston Celtics | 113–106 (2–0) | Los Angeles Lakers |
| Game 3 | April 17 | Los Angeles Lakers | 119–99 (1–2) | Boston Celtics |
| Game 4 | April 19 | Los Angeles Lakers | 105–108 (1–3) | Boston Celtics |
| Game 5 | April 21 | Boston Celtics | 119–126 (3–2) | Los Angeles Lakers |
| Game 6 | April 24 | Los Angeles Lakers | 109–112 (2–4) | Boston Celtics |

Celtics win series 4–2

== Team rosters ==
=== Los Angeles Lakers ===
1962–63 Los Angeles Lakers roster
Players

| Pos. | No. | Player | Height | Weight | DOB | From |
|---|---|---|---|---|---|---|
| SG | 5 | Dick Barnett | 6 ft 4 in (1.93 m) | 190 lb (86 kg) | 1936-10-02 | Tennessee State |
| SF | 22 | Elgin Baylor | 6 ft 5 in (1.96 m) | 225 lb (102 kg) | 1934-09-16 | Seattle |
| C | 25 | Leroy Ellis | 6 ft 10 in (2.08 m) | 210 lb (95 kg) | 1940-03-10 | St. John's |
| SF | 24 | Ron Horn | 6 ft 7 in (2.01 m) | 220 lb (100 kg) | 1938-05-24 | Indiana |
| SG | 33 | Hot Rod Hundley | 6 ft 4 in (1.93 m) | 185 lb (84 kg) | 1934-10-26 | West Virginia |
| PF | 54 | Howie Jolliff | 6 ft 7 in (2.01 m) | 218 lb (99 kg) | 1938-07-20 | Ohio |
| C | 32 | Jim Krebs | 6 ft 8 in (2.03 m) | 230 lb (104 kg) | 1935-09-08 | SMU |
| PF | 35 | Rudy LaRusso | 6 ft 7 in (2.01 m) | 220 lb (100 kg) | 1937-11-11 | Dartmouth |
| SG | 11 | Frank Selvy | 6 ft 3 in (1.91 m) | 180 lb (82 kg) | 1932-11-09 | Furman |
| PG | 44 | Jerry West | 6 ft 3 in (1.91 m) | 175 lb (79 kg) | 1938-05-28 | West Virginia |
| C | 12 | Gene Wiley | 6 ft 10 in (2.08 m) | 210 lb (95 kg) | 1937-11-12 | Wichita State |

Coaches
Head coach
- Fred Schaus

Legend
- (DP) Unsigned draft pick
- (FA) Free agent
- (S) Suspended
- Injured

Roster

== See also ==
- 1963 NBA playoffs
- 1962–63 NBA season
