= Gene Guarilia =

American basketball player (1937–2016)

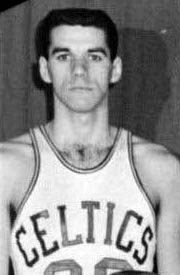
- Guarilia with the Celtics in 1960

Personal information
- Born: September 13, 1937 Old Forge, Pennsylvania, U.S.
- Died: November 20, 2016 (aged 79) Duryea, Pennsylvania, U.S.
- Listed height: 6 ft 5 in (1.96 m)
- Listed weight: 220 lb (100 kg)

Career information
- High school: Duryea (Duryea, Pennsylvania)
- College: Potomac State (1954–1955); George Washington (1956–1959)
- NBA draft: 1959: 2nd round, 14th overall pick
- Drafted by: Boston Celtics
- Playing career: 1959–1964
- Position: Small forward
- Number: 20

Career history
- 1959–1963: Boston Celtics
- 1963–1964: Wilkes-Barre Barons

Career highlights
- 4× NBA champion (1960–1963)

Career NBA statistics
- Points: 413 (3.2 ppg)
- Rebounds: 294 (2.3 rpg)
- Assists: 36 (0.3 apg)
- Stats at NBA.com
- Stats at Basketball Reference

Eugene Michael Guarilia (September 13, 1937 – November 20, 2016) was an American basketball player who played four seasons for the Boston Celtics of the National Basketball Association (NBA). He is historically the only NBA player with at least a three-year career to play on a championship team every season of his career.

== Career ==
=== High school ===
He attended Holy Rosary Grammar School and Duryea High School. Guarilia played freshman basketball for Potomac State College, a junior college in Keyser, West Virginia. He established a State Conference freshman record by scoring 595 points in 1953.

=== College ===
A 6-foot-5-inch (1.96 m) forward Guarilia played for the George Washington University varsity basketball team beginning in the 1956–1957 season. He took the place of All-America Joe Holup, who went on to play for the Syracuse Nationals. In February 1957, Guarilia was averaging 17.1 points per game and was sixth in the NCAA in rebounding. In the twenty games he had played, Guarilia had snatched 353 rebounds. He was selected to the all Southern Conference basketball team in February 1958.

=== NBA ===
Guarilia was selected by the Boston Celtics in the second round of the 1959 NBA draft. Guarilia appeared in 129 games for the Celtics over four seasons (1959–1963), averaging 3.2 points and 2.3 rebounds per game. He earned four NBA championship rings in his brief career.

In December 1959 Boston placed Guarilia on its farm out list to trim their roster to the required 10 player limit. Though officially off the Celtics' roster, he remained in Boston to be available if other players were injured. Red Auerbach considered rotating Guarilia on the active list with one of the other Celtics rookies, like John Richter. The coach said that this move could be done in accordance with NBA rules.

Guarilia was particularly effective in Boston's 1961–62 NBA championship victory over the Los Angeles Lakers. In the final moments of regulation, in the decisive seventh game, he stopped Elgin Baylor. The Celtics went on to win the game in overtime.

A new NBA rule allowed Guarilia to become the 11th man on the Boston roster in the (1962–63) NBA Championship versus the Lakers. On September 25, 1963, the Celtics placed Guarilia on waivers to reduce their playing squad to 16 players.

== Post NBA ==
Guarilia went on to teach health and physical education for many years at Duryea High School, which became Northeast High School, which in turn became Pittston Area Senior High School.

Pittston Area dedicated its court to Guarilia in January 2015, when it painted two shamrocks and Guarilia's No. 20 on the court.

Guaralia died on November 20, 2016.

== Career statistics ==
=== NBA ===
Legend
GP	Games played	GS	Games started	MPG	Minutes per game
FG%	Field goal percentage	3P%	3-point field goal percentage	FT%	Free throw percentage
RPG	Rebounds per game	APG	Assists per game	SPG	Steals per game
BPG	Blocks per game	PPG	Points per game	**Bold**	Career high
†	Won an NBA championship

==== Regular season ====
Year	Team	GP	MPG	FG%	FT%	RPG	APG	PPG
1959–60†	Boston	**48**	**8.8**	.377	**.707**	1.8	**.4**	3.0
1960–61†	Boston	25	8.4	**.404**	.300	**2.8**	.2	3.2
1961–62†	Boston	45	8.2	.379	.641	**2.8**	.2	**3.6**
1962–63†	Boston	11	7.5	.289	.364	1.3	.2	2.4
Career		129	8.4	.376	.611	2.3	.3	3.2

==== Playoffs ====
Year	Team	GP	MPG	FG%	FT%	RPG	APG	PPG
1960†	Boston	**7**	**5.9**	.222	**1.000**	**2.7**	**.4**	**2.0**
1962†	Boston	5	5.2	**.250**	.400	.8	.2	1.2
Career		12	5.6	.231	.727	1.9	.3	1.7
