= 1962–63 Detroit Pistons season =

NBA team season

- Head coach: Dick McGuire
- Owner: Fred Zollner
- Arena: Cobo Arena

Results
- Record: 34–46 (.425)
- Place: Division: 3rd (Western)
- Playoff finish: West Division Semifinals (eliminated 1–3)
- Stats at Basketball Reference

The 1962–63 Detroit Pistons season was the Detroit Pistons' 15th season in the NBA and sixth season in the city of Detroit.

The Pistons finished with a 34-46 (.425) record, 3rd place in the Western Division. The team would advance to the 1963 NBA Playoffs, losing their first round series 3–1 to the St. Louis Hawks. The team was led by forward Bailey Howell (22.7 ppg, 11.5 rpg, NBA All-Star), guard Don Ohl (19.3 ppg) and rookie forward Dave DeBusschere from the University of Detroit (12.7 ppg, 8.7 rpg, All-Rookie Team), who was the team's top pick in the 1962 NBA Draft.

== Regular season ==
=== Season standings ===
Western Division	W	L	PCT	GB	Home	Road	Neutral	Div
x-Los Angeles Lakers	53	27	.663	–	27–7	20–17	6–3	33–13
x-St. Louis Hawks	48	32	.600	5	30–7	13–18	5–7	29–17
x-Detroit Pistons	34	46	.425	19	14–16	8–19	12–11	19–27
San Francisco Warriors	31	49	.388	22	13–20	11–25	7–4	18–28
Chicago Zephyrs	25	55	.313	28	17–17	3–23	5–15	13–27

x – clinched playoff spot

=== Game log ===
1962–63 Game log
#	Date	Opponent	Score	High points	Record
1	October 16	vs. Los Angeles	L 106–122	Ray Scott (37)	0–1
2	October 20	@ St. Louis	L 111–120	Ray Scott (26)	0–2
3	October 23	@ San Francisco	L 113–140	Don Ohl (22)	0–3
4	October 26	@ San Francisco	L 131–132 (OT)	Bailey Howell (28)	0–4
5	October 27	@ Los Angeles	L 118–134	Bailey Howell (21)	0–5
6	October 31	Boston	L 100–115	Bailey Howell (16)	0–6
7	November 3	@ Boston	L 114–125	Ray Scott (21)	0–7
8	November 8	Cincinnati	W 116–114	Bailey Howell (29)	1–7
9	November 10	@ Cincinnati	L 124–135	Bailey Howell (25)	1–8
10	November 11	@ St. Louis	L 100–117	Ray Scott (19)	1–9
11	November 13	vs. Cincinnati	L 109–127	Ray Scott (24)	1–10
12	November 14	San Francisco	W 123–115	Don Ohl (26)	2–10
13	November 17	vs. New York	W 121–113 (OT)	Don Ohl (26)	3–10
14	November 18	Los Angeles	L 98–116	Willie Jones (16)	3–11
15	November 21	Syracuse	L 120–122	Dukes, Ohl (23)	3–12
16	November 22	@ St. Louis	91–106	Bailey Howell (23)	3–13
17	November 23	St. Louis	L 93–121	Bailey Howell (28)	3–14
18	November 24	@ Chicago	L 103–104	Bailey Howell (31)	3–15
19	November 27	vs. Boston	L 115–125	Bailey Howell (29)	3–16
20	November 28	New York	W 143–101	Bailey Howell (37)	4–16
21	December 1	vs. New York	W 117–115	Howell, Ohl (29)	5–16
22	December 4	vs. Syracuse	W 130–129	Don Ohl (32)	6–16
23	December 5	Boston	L 93–106	Ray Scott (22)	6–17
24	December 7	San Francisco	W 123–116	Bailey Howell (30)	7–17
25	December 8	@ New York	L 78–87	Don Ohl (23)	7–18
26	December 9	vs. St. Louis	W 123–119	Don Ohl (32)	8–18
27	December 10	vs. Chicago	W 109–100	Don Ohl (25)	9–18
28	December 12	New York	W 115–106	Bailey Howell (25)	10–18
29	December 13	vs. Boston	L 93–103	Ray Scott (34)	10–19
30	December 15	St. Louis	L 94–112	Ray Scott (21)	10–20
31	December 16	vs. Chicago	L 106–110	Bob Ferry (28)	10–21
32	December 18	vs. Chicago	L 110–113	Don Ohl (25)	10–22
33	December 19	Chicago	W 115–113	Bailey Howell (25)	11–22
34	December 21	San Francisco	L 113–122	Bailey Howell (27)	11–23
35	December 22	vs. Chicago	W 122–110	Don Ohl (32)	12–23
36	December 25	@ Cincinnati	L 120–131	Bailey Howell (31)	12–24
37	December 26	@ Chicago	W 123–116	Dave DeBusschere (30)	13–24
38	December 30	Los Angeles	L 130–135	Bailey Howell (28)	13–25
39	January 2	Cincinnati	W 138–118	Bailey Howell (23)	14–25
40	January 4	vs. St. Louis	L 100–121	Johnny Egan (20)	14–26
41	January 5	St. Louis	90–92	Bob Ferry (21)	15–26
42	January 6	@ New York	W 103–102	Don Ohl (21)	16–26
43	January 8	vs. New York	W 109–93	Bailey Howell (28)	17–26
44	January 9	Los Angeles	L 115–123	Ray Scott (29)	17–27
45	January 11	Chicago	W 116–112	Bailey Howell (21)	18–27
46	January 12	vs. Syracuse	W 146–115	Don Ohl (24)	19–27
47	January 13	@ Syracuse	L 114–148	Bailey Howell (26)	19–28
48	January 21	@ Los Angeles	L 94–124	Bailey Howell (25)	19–29
49	January 22	@ San Francisco	W 115–107	Howell, Ohl (23)	20–29
50	January 23	@ Los Angeles	L 119–123	Don Ohl (43)	20–30
51	January 24	vs. San Francisco	L 114–138	Bailey Howell (32)	20–31
52	January 25	@ Chicago	W 113–111	Don Ohl (37)	21–31
53	January 31	vs. Los Angeles	L 122–127	Bob Ferry (29)	21–32
54	February 1	Los Angeles	L 109–119	Don Ohl (31)	21–33
55	February 3	@ Boston	L 128–137	Ray Scott (32)	21–34
56	February 5	vs. St. Louis	L 105–120	Bailey Howell (36)	21–35
57	February 6	San Francisco	L 116–117	Bailey Howell (33)	21–36
58	February 8	Syracuse	L 135–162	Don Ohl (25)	21–37
59	February 10	@ St. Louis	W 102–95	Bailey Howell (22)	22–37
60	February 12	San Francisco	W 120–115	Bob Ferry (29)	23–37
61	February 13	@ San Francisco	W 134–132 (OT)	Don Ohl (35)	24–37
62	February 14	@ Los Angeles	L 111–128	Don Ohl (22)	24–38
63	February 16	Cincinnati	L 99–110	Ray Scott (16)	24–39
64	February 17	@ Syracuse	L 124–143	Jackie Moreland (26)	24–40
65	February 19	@ New York	W 121–112	Don Ohl (30)	25–40
66	February 20	Boston	L 113–117	Bailey Howell (25)	25–41
67	February 22	Syracuse	W 126–117	Bailey Howell (31)	26–41
68	February 23	@ Cincinnati	105–102	Bailey Howell (25)	27–41
69	February 24	vs. Cincinnati	W 119–110	Bailey Howell (33)	28–41
70	February 25	vs. Los Angeles	L 107–113	Ray Scott (26)	28–42
71	February 28	Chicago	W 112–104	Bailey Howell (24)	29–42
72	March 1	vs. St. Louis	W 115–113	Don Ohl (34)	30–42
73	March 2	@ Syracuse	L 128–152	Bailey Howell (28)	30–43
74	March 3	Syracuse	L 123–127	Dave DeBusschere (31)	30–44
75	March 5	vs. San Francisco	W 111–102	Don Ohl (42)	31–44
76	March 7	Boston	L 104–115	Bailey Howell (28)	31–45
77	March 8	vs. San Francisco	W 131–123 (OT)	Don Ohl (41)	32–45
78	March 10	Los Angeles	W 124–116	Bailey Howell (29)	33–45
79	March 13	New York	W 112–89	Don Ohl (24)	34–45
80	March 17	@ St. Louis	L 105–119	Dave DeBusschere (19)	34–46

== Playoffs ==
1963 playoff game log
Division Semifinals: 1–3 (home: 1–1; road: 0–2)

Game	Date	Team	Score	High points	High rebounds	High assists	Location Attendance	Series
1	March 20	@ St. Louis	L 99–118	Dave DeBusschere (30)	Dave DeBusschere (18)	Don Ohl (6)	Kiel Auditorium; 5,818	0–1
2	March 22	@ St. Louis	L 108–122	Scott, Ohl (29)	Scott, Howell (9)	Don Ohl (6)	Kiel Auditorium	0–2
3	March 24	St. Louis	W 107–103	DeBusschere, Ferry (23)	Dave DeBusschere (26)	Jones, Ohl (4)	Cobo Arena; 3,232	1–2
4	March 26	St. Louis	L 100–104	Don Ohl (32)	Ray Scott (14)	Ray Scott (6)	Cobo Arena; 3,257	1–3

1963 schedule

== Awards and records ==
- Bailey Howell, All-NBA Second Team
- Dave DeBusschere, NBA All-Rookie Team 1st Team
