= Howie Montgomery =

American basketball player

Personal information
- Born: August 22, 1940 (age 86)
- Listed height: 6 ft 5 in (1.96 m)
- Listed weight: 220 lb (100 kg)

Career information
- College: UT Rio Grande Valley (1958–1961)
- NBA draft: 1962: 7th round, 59th overall pick
- Drafted by: San Francisco Warriors
- Position: Small forward
- Number: 43

Career history
- 1962–1963: San Francisco Warriors
- Stats at NBA.com
- Stats at Basketball Reference

Howard Montgomery (born August 22, 1940) is an American former professional basketball player for the San Francisco Warriors of the National Basketball Association (NBA). He played a total of 20 games.

== Career statistics ==
Legend
GP	Games played	GS	Games started	MPG	Minutes per game
FG%	Field goal percentage	3P%	3-point field goal percentage	FT%	Free throw percentage
RPG	Rebounds per game	APG	Assists per game	SPG	Steals per game
BPG	Blocks per game	PPG	Points per game	**Bold**	Career high

=== NBA ===
==== Regular season ====
Year	Team	GP	MPG	FG%	FT%	RPG	APG	PPG
1962–63	San Francisco	20	18.2	.425	.609	3.5	1.1	7.2
