= Dan Tieman =

American basketball player, coach, and teacher

Personal information
- Born: November 30, 1940 Covington, Kentucky, U.S.
- Died: October 30, 2012 (aged 71)
- Listed height: 6 ft 0 in (1.83 m)
- Listed weight: 185 lb (84 kg)

Career information
- High school: Covington Catholic (Covington, Kentucky)
- College: Thomas More (1958–1962)
- NBA draft: 1962: undrafted
- Position: Point guard
- Number: 41

Career history
- 1962–1963: Cincinnati Royals
- Stats at NBA.com
- Stats at Basketball Reference

Daniel Theodore Tieman (November 30, 1940 – October 30, 2012) was an American basketball player, coach, and teacher.

Tieman graduated from Covington Catholic High School in Kentucky in 1958, then played basketball and baseball at Villa Madonna College, today known as Thomas More University, graduating in 1962. He was the basketball team's MVP in 1960 and 1961. He appeared in the 1960 NAIA Division I men's basketball tournament. In his college career, he recorded 1,454 points and 319 assists. The Kansas City Steers of the American Basketball League drafted Tieman. but was later invited to play with the National Basketball Association's Cincinnati Royals, who were coached by Tieman's college coach, Charlie Wolf. Tieman played in 29 games with the Cincinnati Royals during the 1962–63 NBA season.

After his playing days, he worked at Covington Catholic as a teacher, basketball coach, and administrator. As a basketball coach, he recorded 314 wins.

Tieman was inducted into the Greater Cincinnati Basketball Hall of Fame. He died in 2012 after struggles with cancer.

== Career statistics ==
Legend
GP	Games played	GS	Games started	MPG	Minutes per game
FG%	Field goal percentage	3P%	3-point field goal percentage	FT%	Free throw percentage
RPG	Rebounds per game	APG	Assists per game	SPG	Steals per game
BPG	Blocks per game	PPG	Points per game	**Bold**	Career high

=== NBA ===
==== Regular season ====
Year	Team	GP	MPG	FG%	FT%	RPG	APG	PPG
1962–63	Cincinnati	29	6.1	.263	.400	.8	.9	1.2
