= Charles Hardnett =

American basketball player and coach (1938–2019)

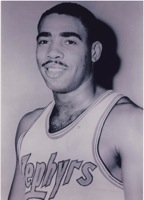

Personal information
- Born: September 13, 1938 Atlanta, Georgia, U.S.
- Died: July 6, 2019 (aged 80) Louisville, Kentucky, U.S.
- Listed height: 6 ft 8 in (2.03 m)
- Listed weight: 225 lb (102 kg)

Career information
- High school: Carver (Atlanta, Georgia)
- College: Grambling State (1958–1962)
- NBA draft: 1962: 3rd round, 19th overall pick
- Drafted by: St. Louis Hawks
- Playing career: 1962–1968
- Position: Power forward / center
- Number: 54, 23

Career history
- 1962–1965: Chicago Zephyrs / Baltimore Bullets
- 1964–1965: Grand Rapids Trackers
- 1965–1967: Harrisburg Patriots
- 1967–1968: Scranton Miners

Career highlights
- All-EPBL First Team (1966); NAIA tournament MVP (1961)

Career NBA statistics
- Points: 1,198 (7.3 ppg)
- Rebounds: 930 (5.7 rpg)
- Assists: 103 (0.6 apg)
- Stats at NBA.com
- Stats at Basketball Reference

Charles "Charlie Red" Hardnett (September 13, 1938 – July 6, 2019) was an American basketball player who played three seasons in the National Basketball Association (NBA). The 6' 8" power forward played for Carver High School in Atlanta. He played college basketball for Grambling State University from 1959 to 1963. Hardnett earned All-America honors in 1962. He was also the NAIA Basketball Tournament MVP in 1961. Hardnett was drafted in the third round (third pick) of the 1962 NBA draft by the St. Louis Hawks. He played for the Chicago Zephyrs / Baltimore Bullets (NBA) from 1962 to 1965. Hardnett also coached at the college level. He coached at Coppin State College (Baltimore) from 1970 to 1974, and at Morris Brown College (Atlanta) from 1974 to 1980.

== High school career ==
Hardnett attended Carver High School in Atlanta from 1955 to 1958. While in High School, Hardnett played three sports including basketball, football, and baseball. He earned several honors as an athlete and student while at Carver, and was the only male athlete to attend and graduate college in his graduating class. His accomplishments as a high school student-athlete are as follows:

- All-City in Football – Junior(1957) and Senior (1958)
- All-City in Basketball – Junior(1957) and Senior (1958)
- All-State in Basketball – Senior (1958)
- State Tournament MVP – Senior (1958)
- Black High School All-American Team – Senior (1958)
- Member of the Baseball team for three years
- President of the student body – Senior (1958)
- The most improved student award – Senior (1958)
- Four-Year Scholarship to Grambling College

== Collegiate career ==
Hardnett went to Grambling College in 1958, and became an instant success. He was coached by Fred Hobdy who coached at Grambling for 30 seasons. During his days at Grambling, Hardnett played with players such as Willis Reed. During his years at Grambling, Hardnett amassed the following honors:

1958–1959

- First year starter
- Led the team in rebounding

1959–1960

- Most Valuable Player – Georgia Invitational Tournament, Atlanta
- NAIA All-American Team
- Selected to the NAIA All-Stars that participated in the 1960 Olympic Trials
  Beat Ohio State (1960 NCAA Champions) in the first round
- First Team All-SWAC

1960–1961

- NAIA All-American
- NAIA Tournament MVP
- NAIA All-Tournament Team
- Basketball Player of the year award – 100% Tip-Off Club Atlanta
- Chuck Taylor All-American Second Team
  Only small college player selected
- First Team All-SWAC
- NAIA Basketball Championship
  2nd HBCU to win the event (Only National Championship for Grambling)

1961–62

- NAIA All-American Team
- Chuck Taylor All-American First Team
  Only small college player selected
- First Team All-SWAC

Hardnett scored over 2,000 points in his career at Grambling and grabbed over 2,000 rebounds (16.9 RPG—First All-Time at Grambling). In addition, Hardnett was drafted by the NBA and became the First African-American drafted by the NBA from the state of Georgia, the second Player drafted by the NBA from Grambling, and only the third African-American drafted by the NBA from an HBCU in the state of Louisiana. In 1973, Hardnett was elected to the NAIA Hall of Fame as an athlete.

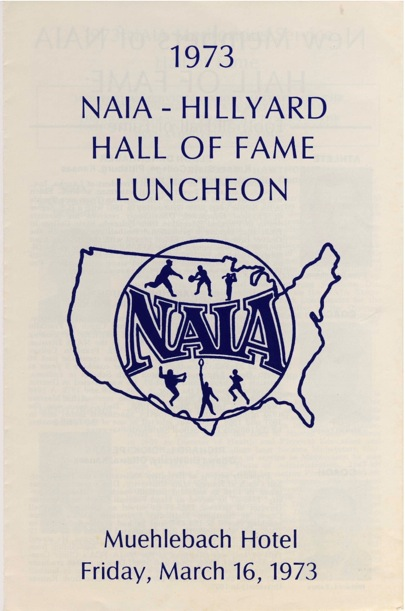
Cover for NAIA HOF Luncheon Program (1973)

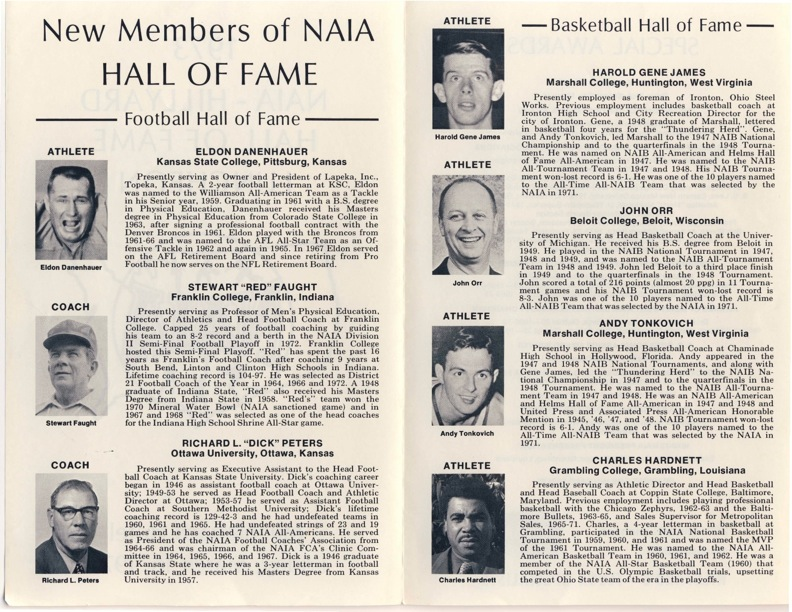
Pages 1 and 2 of HOF Luncheon Program (1973)

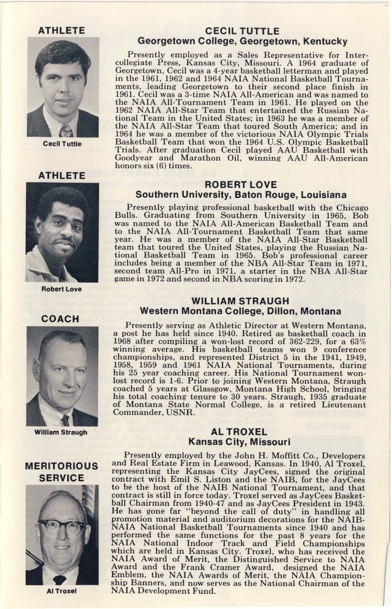
Page 3 of HOF Luncheon Program (1973)

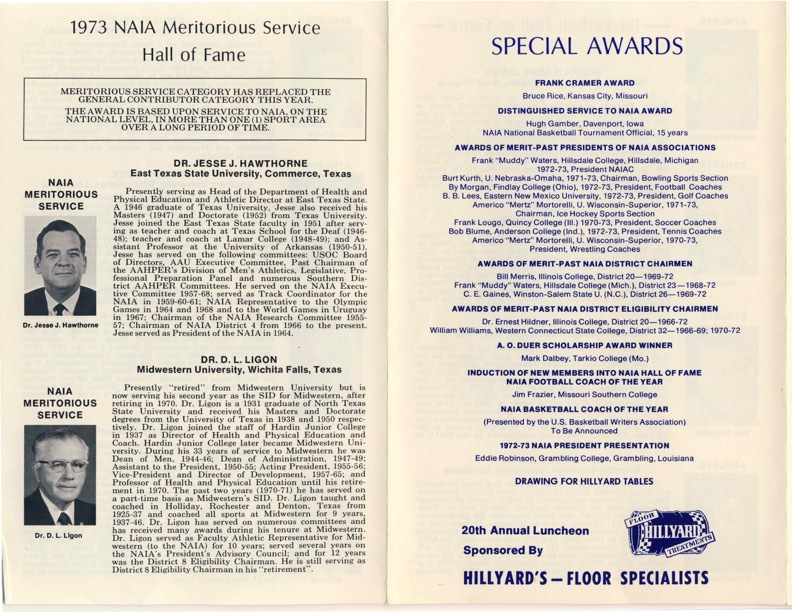
Page 4 and back cover of HOF Luncheon Program (1973)

2009

- Inducted into the Grambling Legends Sports Hall of Fame at the inaugural induction ceremony July 18, 2009, Monroe, Louisiana.

The inaugural induction class includes Willis Reed (Basketball), Tommy Agee (Baseball), Ernie Ladd (Football/Wrestling), Henry Dyer (Football), Ralph Garr (Baseball), Charlie Hardnett (Basketball), Robert Hopkins (Basketball), Lane Howell (Football), Stone Johnson (Football/Track), Willie Joseph (Football), Legolian "Boots" Moore (Football), Bo Murray (Football), Helen Richards-Smith (Basketball), Richard Stebbins (Track), Hershell West (Basketball), Willie Young (Football), Tank Younger (Football), Ralph W.E. Jones (College President and Coach), Eddie Robinson (Coach), Collie Nicholson (Sports Information Officer), Fred C. Hobdy (Coach), Willie Brown (Football), Buck Buchanan (Football), Willie Davis (Football) and Charlie Joiner (Football).

2012

- NAIA 75th Anniversary Team at NAIA Championship Kansas City, Missouri.

2015

- Inducted into the Coppin State University Hall of Fame February 2015, Baltimore.
- Inducted into the Carver High School Hall of Fame April 2015, Atlanta.

== Professional career ==
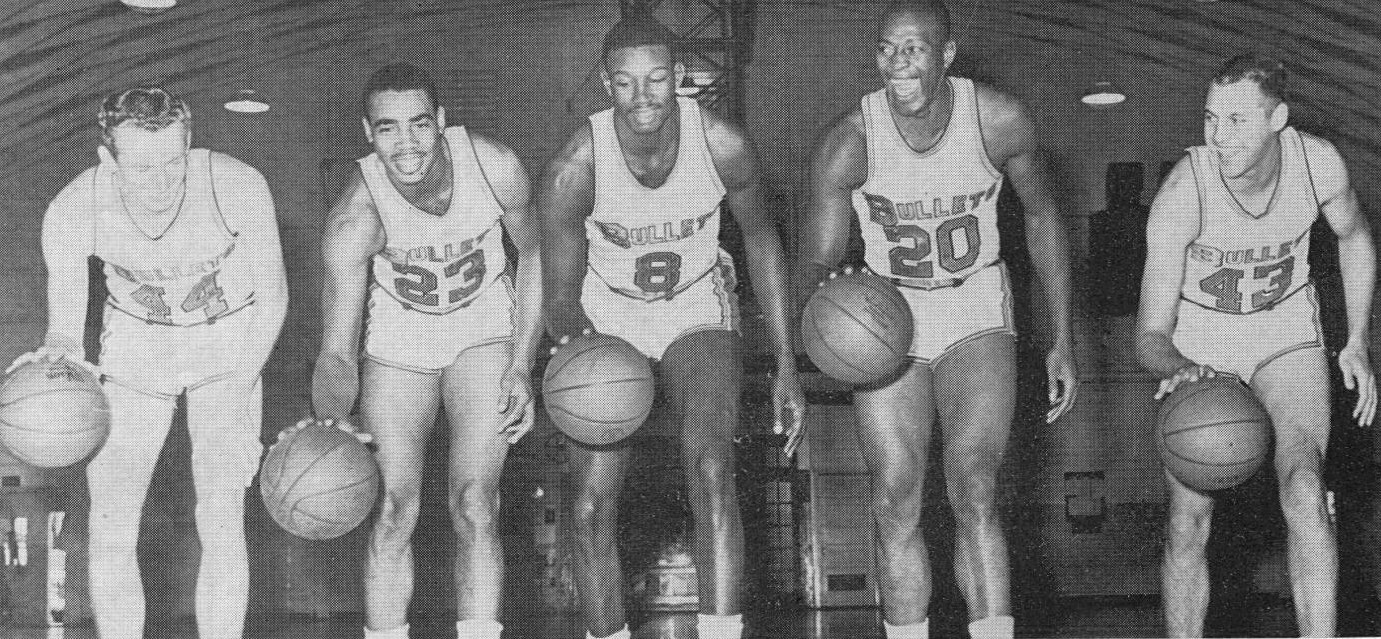
Members of the 1963–64 Baltimore Bullets from left to right: Rod Thorn, Charles Hardnett, Walt Bellamy, Gus Johnson and Terry Dischinger. Thorn, Bellamy and Johnson were elected to the Naismith Basketball Hall of Fame.

Hardnett's professional basketball career started by being drafted by the St. Louis Hawks in the 3rd round of the 1962 NBA draft. He played in Chicago for the Zephyrs and in Baltimore for the Bullets. After the NBA, Hardnett went on to play in the Eastern Professional Basketball League (EPBL). He played three more years of professional basketball for the Harrisburg Patriots and the Scranton Miners. He was selected to the All-EPBL First Team in 1966.

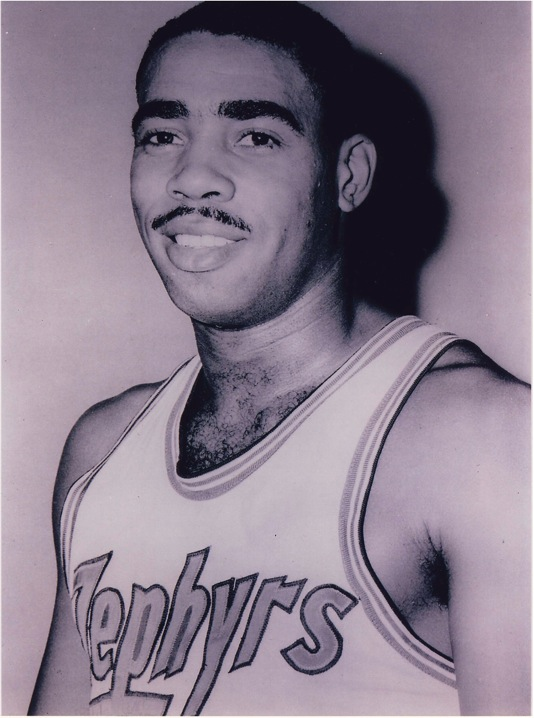
Hardnett's headshot for the Chicago Zephyrs

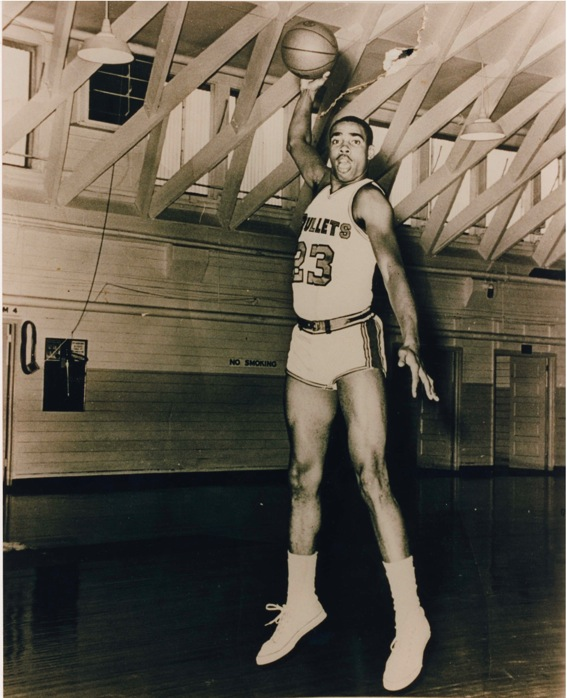
Hardnett playing for the Baltimore Bullets

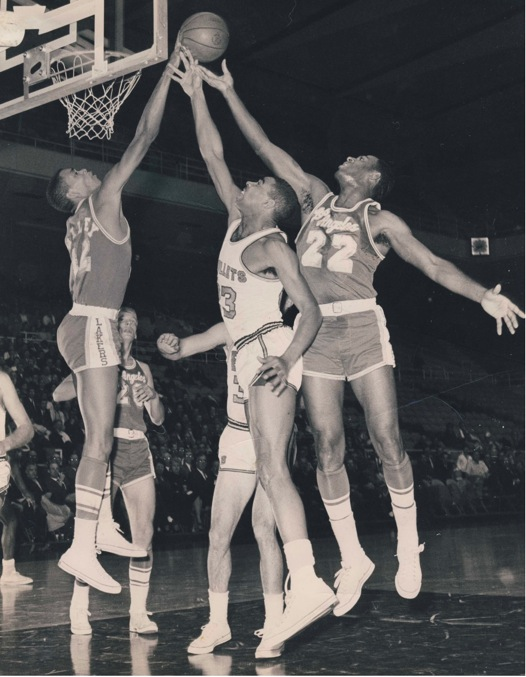
Hardnett playing with the Baltimore Bullets

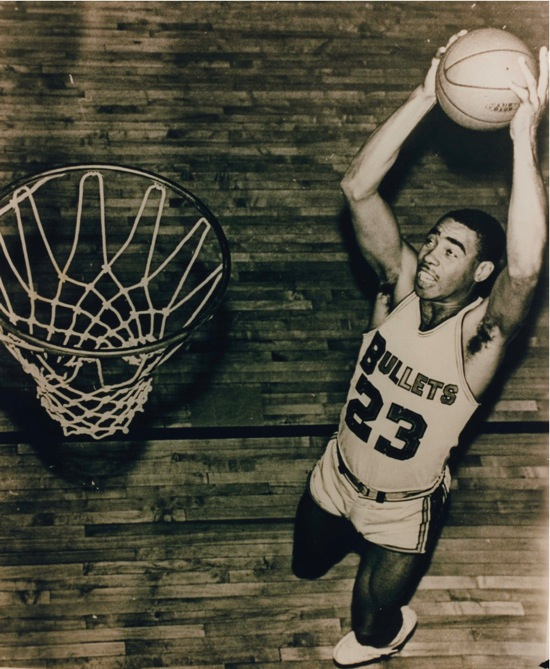
Hardnett playing for the Baltimore Bullets

== Coaching career ==
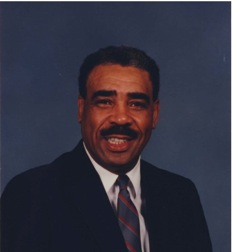
Charles Hardnett

After a successful playing career, Hardnett entered a career of coaching. His coaching career would have him serve as the Head Basketball Coach at Coppin State in Baltimore and at Morris Brown College in Atlanta. During his career at Morris Brown College he served quadruple duties as the Head Basketball Coach, Athletic Director, Head Baseball Coach, and Head Golf Coach. He coached for 12 years and amassed a 160–150 coaching record. During his coaching career, Hardnett had the following highlights:

- Won 2 Regular Season Championships 1972, 1973
- Won 1 Conference Tournament Championship 1974
- Finished 3rd in Conference Tournament twice (??, ??)
- Took Coppin State to NAIA District 19 Playoffs twice (??, ??)
- Players for Charles Hardnett
  - 1 Player Drafted by the NBA (Name and Year)
  - 7 Players on All-Conference Teams (Names and Years)
  - 3 Players on All-Tournament Teams (Names and Years)
- Named the Coach of the Year twice (team years)
- Named Atlanta University Coach of the Year in 1980, Presented at Extra Point Club, Inc. of Atlanta

== Family ==
Charles Hardnett was married to Bernice Hardnett, and lived in Louisville, Kentucky. He and his wife had three children: Dana S. Hardnett, Charles R. Hardnett (married to Felicia A. Hardnett), and Derek W. Hardnett (married to Quovardis Hardnett). He and his wife had several grandchildren: Daveon, Wendy, William, Derek, Jeremy, Erin, and Charles Jr. (CJ).

Hardnett died on July 6, 2019.

== Career statistics ==
Legend
GP	Games played	GS	Games started	MPG	Minutes per game
FG%	Field goal percentage	3P%	3-point field goal percentage	FT%	Free throw percentage
RPG	Rebounds per game	APG	Assists per game	SPG	Steals per game
BPG	Blocks per game	PPG	Points per game	**Bold**	Career high

=== NBA ===
==== Regular season ====
Year	Team	GP	MPG	FG%	FT%	RPG	APG	PPG
1962–63	Chicago	**78**	**21.2**	**.441**	.645	**7.7**	**.9**	**10.6**
1963–64	Baltimore	66	9.3	.412	**.672**	3.8	.4	4.5
1964–65	Baltimore	20	10.0	.313	.590	3.9	.1	3.7
Career		164	15.1	.423	.647	5.7	.6	7.3

==== Playoffs ====
Year	Team	GP	MPG	FG%	FT%	RPG	APG	PPG
1965	Baltimore	5	4.4	.400	.400	1.2	.4	2.0

== Honors ==
- In 1973, Hardnett was elected to the NAIA Hall of Fame as an athlete.
- In 2009, Hardnett was inducted into the Grambling Legends Sports Hall of Fame at the inaugural induction ceremony on July 18, 2009, in Monroe, Louisiana.
- 2012, Hardnett was honored with the NAIA 75th Anniversary Team at the NAIA Championship in Kansas City, Missouri.
- In 2015, Hardnett was inducted into the Coppin State University Hall of Fame.

== See also ==
- NAIA Basketball Tournament Most Valuable Player
