= Fred LaCour =

American basketball player

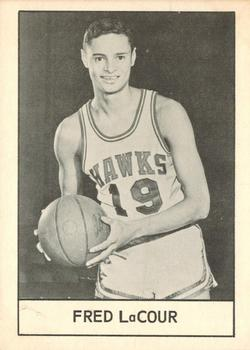
- LaCour with the St. Louis Hawks, c. 1961

Personal information
- Born: February 7, 1938 San Francisco, California, U.S.
- Died: August 5, 1972 (aged 34) San Francisco, California, U.S.
- Listed height: 6 ft 5 in (1.96 m)
- Listed weight: 210 lb (95 kg)

Career information
- High school: St. Ignatius Prep (San Francisco, California)
- College: San Francisco (1957–1959)
- NBA draft: 1960: 3rd round, 22nd overall pick
- Drafted by: St. Louis Hawks
- Playing career: 1960–1964
- Position: Point guard / small forward
- Number: 19, 12

Career history
- 1960: San Francisco Investors
- 1960–1962: St. Louis Hawks
- 1962–1963: Oakland Oaks
- 1963: San Francisco Warriors
- 1963–1964: Wilkes-Barre Barons

Career highlights
- 2× California Mr. Basketball (1955, 1956)

Career NBA statistics
- Points: 940 (6.5 ppg)
- Rebounds: 474 (3.3 rpg)
- Assists: 269 (1.9 apg)
- Stats at NBA.com
- Stats at Basketball Reference

Fred LaCour (February 7, 1938 – August 5, 1972) was an American professional basketball player. LaCour was selected in the 1960 NBA draft by the St. Louis Hawks after a collegiate career at the University of San Francisco. In his NBA career, LaCour averaged 6.5 points, 3.3 rebounds, and 1.9 assists per game while playing for the Hawks and then the San Francisco Warriors. He also played one season for the San Francisco Investors of the National Industrial Basketball League in 1960.

== High school career ==
LaCour played on the varsity team at St. Ignatius College Preparatory in San Francisco, California where he graduated from in 1956. He stood at 6 ft 5 in (1.96 m) and his array of ball-handling and shooting abilities enabled him to play at any position. LaCour led his team to a combined 81–12 record in his three seasons. He was selected as California Mr. Basketball in 1955 and 1956. LaCour was inducted into the San Francisco Prep Hall of Fame for basketball in 1983.

== Personal life ==
LaCour was of Louisiana Creole mixed-race descent. His friends claimed that he subsequently struggled with his racial identity. His coach with the San Francisco Dons, Phil Woolpert, stated that LaCour's "attempts to integrate into a white-type culture met rebuff after rebuff" and he did not identity as a black person; Woolpert described it as the "most difficult and insoluble problem [he] ever confronted."

== Death ==
On August 5, 1972, LaCour died at the Ralph K. Davies Memorial Hospital in San Francisco. He had been hospitalized for almost three months during a battle with cancer. LaCour donated his body for cancer research.

== NBA career statistics ==
Legend
GP	Games played	GS	Games started	MPG	Minutes per game
FG%	Field goal percentage	3P%	3-point field goal percentage	FT%	Free throw percentage
RPG	Rebounds per game	APG	Assists per game	SPG	Steals per game
BPG	Blocks per game	PPG	Points per game	**Bold**	Career high

=== Regular season ===
Year	Team	GP	MPG	FG%	FT%	RPG	APG	PPG
1960–61	St. Louis	55	13.1	.417	.750	3.2	1.5	5.6
1961–62	St. Louis	**73**	**20.6**	**.429**	**.815**	**3.7**	**2.3**	**7.8**
1962–63	San Francisco	16	10.7	.384	.563	1.5	1.2	4.1
Career		144	16.7	.421	.774	3.3	1.9	6.5

=== Playoffs ===
Year	Team	GP	MPG	FG%	FT%	RPG	APG	PPG
1960–61	St. Louis	5	9.4	.333	.857	1.2	.8	4.0
