= 1962–63 Syracuse Nationals season =

Season for the Nationals in the National Basketball Association

- Head coach: Alex Hannum
- Arena: Onondaga War Memorial

Results
- Record: 48–32 (.600)
- Place: Division: 2nd (Eastern)
- Playoff finish: East Division Semifinals (eliminated 2–3)
- Stats at Basketball Reference

Local media
- Television: none
- Radio: none

The 1962–63 Syracuse Nationals season was the Nationals' 14th season in the NBA. In their final season in Syracuse, the Nationals finished with a record of 48–32, good enough for 2nd place in the NBA Eastern Division. They qualified for the playoffs but lost to the Cincinnati Royals, 3 games to 2 in the East semifinals.

Following this season, the Nationals relocated to Philadelphia and became the 76ers, filling the void left by the Warriors, who moved to the Bay Area the prior year.

== Roster ==
1962–63 Syracuse Nationals roster
Players

Pos.	No.	Player	Height	Weight	DOB	From
G	24	Al Bianchi	6 ft 3 in (1.91 m)	185 lb (84 kg)	1932-03-26	Bowling Green
F/C	23	Len Chappell	6 ft 8 in (2.03 m)	240 lb (109 kg)	1941-01-31	Wake Forest
G	21	Larry Costello	6 ft 1 in (1.85 m)	185 lb (84 kg)	1931-07-02	Niagara
F	20	Dave Gambee	6 ft 6 in (1.98 m)	215 lb (98 kg)	1937-04-16	Oregon State
G/F	15	Hal Greer	6 ft 2 in (1.88 m)	175 lb (79 kg)	1936-06-26	Marshall
F/C	10	Johnny Kerr	6 ft 9 in (2.06 m)	230 lb (104 kg)	1932-08-17	Illinois
G	14	Porter Meriwether	6 ft 2 in (1.88 m)	180 lb (82 kg)	1940-03-16	Tennessee State
G	5	Paul Neumann	6 ft 1 in (1.85 m)	175 lb (79 kg)	1938-01-30	Stanford
F	12	Joe Roberts	6 ft 6 in (1.98 m)	214 lb (97 kg)	1936-05-18	Ohio State
F/C	4	Dolph Schayes	6 ft 7 in (2.01 m)	195 lb (88 kg)	1928-05-19	NYU
F	22	Lee Shaffer	6 ft 7 in (2.01 m)	215 lb (98 kg)	1939-02-23	North Carolina
G/F	25	Chet Walker	6 ft 6 in (1.98 m)	200 lb (91 kg)	1940-02-22	Bradley
G/F	14	Ben Warley	6 ft 5 in (1.96 m)	200 lb (91 kg)	1936-02-04	Tennessee State

Coaches
Head coach

Alex Hannum

Legend
- (DP) Unsigned draft pick
- (FA) Free agent
- (S) Suspended
- Injured

Roster

== Regular season ==
=== Season standings ===
Eastern Division	W	L	PCT	GB	Home	Road	Neutral	Div
x-Boston Celtics	58	22	.725	–	25–5	21–16	12–1	25–11
x-Syracuse Nationals	48	32	.600	10	23–5	13–19	12–8	21–15
x-Cincinnati Royals	42	38	.525	16	23–10	15–19	4–9	20–16
New York Knicks	21	59	.263	37	12–22	5–28	4–9	6–30

x – clinched playoff spot

=== Game log ===
1962–63 Game log
#	Date	Opponent	Score	High points	Record
1	October 20	Los Angeles	102–108	Lee Shaffer (22)	1–0
2	October 23	@ New York	123–119	Johnny Kerr (31)	2–0
3	October 26	Chicago	112–130	Greer, Kerr (18)	3–0
4	October 27	@ Boston	98–118	Lee Shaffer (21)	3–1
5	October 31	N St. Louis	126–108	Johnny Kerr (24)	4–1
6	November 3	Cincinnati	111–130	Larry Costello (22)	5–1
7	November 9	St. Louis	93–101	Hal Greer (22)	6–1
8	November 14	@ Cincinnati	120–125	Hal Greer (24)	6–2
9	November 15	N Los Angeles	120–98	Johnny Kerr (28)	7–2
10	November 16	Boston	105–113	Hal Greer (25)	8–2
11	November 17	@ St. Louis	107–113	Hal Greer (32)	8–3
12	November 18	N Chicago	110–107	Johnny Kerr (22)	9–3
13	November 21	@ Detroit	122–120	Larry Costello (30)	10–3
14	November 22	N Boston	130–120	Lee Shaffer (32)	11–3
15	November 23	@ New York	110–116	Gambee, Kerr (17)	11–4
16	November 24	New York	126–137	Lee Shaffer (25)	12–4
17	November 27	@ St. Louis	105–120	Hal Greer (25)	12–5
18	November 29	@ Chicago	112–85	Lee Shaffer (23)	13–5
19	November 30	@ Cincinnati	117–130	Johnny Kerr (17)	13–6
20	December 1	@ Boston	110–129	Larry Costello (22)	13–7
21	December 4	N Detroit	129–130	Hal Greer (27)	13–8
22	December 7	N Chicago	149–129	Hal Greer (24)	14–8
23	December 8	Boston	97–102	Lee Shaffer (28)	15–8
24	December 9	N Los Angeles	117–114	Lee Shaffer (30)	16–8
25	December 11	@ San Francisco	124–136	Lee Shaffer (28)	16–9
26	December 12	@ Los Angeles	120–126	Lee Shaffer (33)	16–10
27	December 16	@ San Francisco	144–137	Greer, Shaffer (32)	17–10
28	December 17	@ Los Angeles	114–121	Lee Shaffer (26)	17–11
29	December 19	@ Cincinnati	120–129	Lee Shaffer (32)	17–12
30	December 22	San Francisco	123–118	Lee Shaffer (26)	17–13
31	December 25	@ New York	123–111	Lee Shaffer (31)	18–13
32	December 27	New York	92–128	Kerr, Shaffer (24)	19–13
33	December 28	N San Francisco	117–124	Lee Shaffer (30)	19–14
34	December 29	Los Angeles	132–123	Lee Shaffer (26)	19–15
35	January 2	St. Louis	95–120	Hal Greer (23)	20–15
36	January 3	N New York	115–123	Hal Greer (30)	20–16
37	January 5	N Cincinnati	136–117	Lee Shaffer (33)	21–16
38	January 6	Chicago	102–114	Hal Greer (21)	22–16
39	January 8	N Cincinnati	119–116	Hal Greer (31)	23–16
40	January 9	Cincinnati	116–112	Hal Greer (25)	23–17
41	January 11	@ Boston	117–134	Johnny Kerr (20)	23–18
42	January 12	N Detroit	115–146	Chet Walker (30)	23–19
43	January 13	Detroit	114–148	Lee Shaffer (32)	24–19
44	January 19	Boston	148–149 (OT)	Chet Walker (35)	25–19
45	January 22	N St. Louis	93–113	Lee Shaffer (20)	25–20
46	January 23	@ Chicago	94–104	Kerr, Shaffer (21)	25–21
47	January 25	N Los Angeles	114–122	Hal Greer (24)	25–22
48	January 26	@ San Francisco	116–110	Hal Greer (23)	26–22
49	January 27	@ San Francisco	119–110	Greer, Shaffer (26)	27–22
50	January 29	@ St. Louis	105–123	Al Bianchi (22)	27–23
51	January 31	St. Louis	100–112	Johnny Kerr (30)	28–23
52	February 1	@ Boston	125–111	Chet Walker (21)	29–23
53	February 2	N Cincinnati	117–113	Al Bianchi (20)	30–23
54	February 3	Cincinnati	125–115	Chet Walker (21)	30–24
55	February 5	@ New York	120–100	Chet Walker (22)	31–24
56	February 6	Boston	109–126	Kerr, Schayes (17)	32–24
57	February 8	@ Detroit	162–135	Lee Shaffer (30)	33–24
58	February 9	N New York	122–116	Lee Shaffer (29)	34–24
59	February 10	San Francisco	115–139	Greer, Kerr (26)	35–24
60	February 12	@ St. Louis	100–128	Bianchi, Kerr, Neumann (13)	35–25
61	February 13	N Cincinnati	122–124	Lee Shaffer (31)	35–26
62	February 14	Chicago	117–136	Larry Costello (23)	36–26
63	February 15	N Boston	114–123	Hal Greer (24)	36–27
64	February 17	Detroit	124–143	Bianchi, Neumann (19)	37–27
65	February 19	N Chicago	118–110	Lee Shaffer (41)	38–27
66	February 20	Cincinnati	109–128	Hal Greer (24)	39–27
67	February 21	@ Chicago	91–108	Hal Greer (19)	39–28
68	February 22	@ Detroit	117–126	Lee Shaffer (29)	39–29
69	February 24	New York	126–143	Greer, Kerr (20)	40–29
70	February 27	Los Angeles	111–122	Lee Shaffer (27)	41–29
71	February 28	N New York	132–124	Len Chappell (31)	42–29
72	March 2	Detroit	128–152	Lee Shaffer (32)	43–29
73	March 3	@ Detroit	127–123	Lee Shaffer (32)	44–29
74	March 5	@ New York	131–121	Hal Greer (31)	45–29
75	March 7	New York	118–129	Hal Greer (28)	46–29
76	March 10	San Francisco	148–163	Lee Shaffer (31)	47–29
77	March 12	@ Chicago	130–106	Johnny Kerr (24)	48–29
78	March 13	@ Cincinnati	114–128	Dave Gambee (15)	48–30
79	March 16	Boston	125–121	Lee Shaffer (28)	48–31
80	March 17	@ Boston	116–125	Hal Greer (25)	48–32

== Playoffs ==
1963 playoff game log
Division Semifinals: 2–3 (home: 2–1; road: 0–2)

Game	Date	Team	Score	High points	High rebounds	High assists	Location Attendance	Series
1	March 19	Cincinnati	W 123–120	Hal Greer (32)	Hal Greer (11)	Costello, Greer (6)	Onondaga War Memorial; 4,335	1–0
2	March 21	@ Cincinnati	L 115–133	Chet Walker (24)	Johnny Kerr (12)	Larry Costello (3)	Cincinnati Gardens; 3,205	1–1
3	March 23	Cincinnati	W 121–117	Lee Shaffer (34)	Johnny Kerr (17)	Hal Greer (7)	Onondaga War Memorial; 8,007	2–1
4	March 24	@ Cincinnati	L 118–125	Lee Shaffer (32)	Johnny Kerr (14)	Larry Costello (5)	Cincinnati Gardens; 3,331	2–2
5	March 26	Cincinnati	L 127–131 (OT)	Lee Shaffer (45)	Johnny Kerr (20)	Paul Neumann (6)	Onondaga War Memorial; 7,418	2–3

1963 schedule

== Awards and records ==
- Hal Greer, All-NBA Second Team
