= 1962–63 New York Knicks season =

Season of National Basketball Association team the New York Knicks

- Head coach: Eddie Donovan
- General manager: Fred Podesta
- Arena: Madison Square Garden

Results
- Record: 21–59 (.263)
- Place: Division: 4th (Eastern)
- Playoff finish: Did not qualify
- Stats at Basketball Reference

Local media
- Television: WPIX
- Radio: WCBS

The 1962–63 New York Knicks season was the Knicks' 17th season in the NBA.

== Regular season ==
=== Season standings ===
| Eastern Division | W | L | PCT | GB | Home | Road | Neutral | Div |
|---|---|---|---|---|---|---|---|---|
| x-Boston Celtics | 58 | 22 | .725 | – | 25–5 | 21–16 | 12–1 | 25–11 |
| x-Syracuse Nationals | 48 | 32 | .600 | 10 | 23–5 | 13–19 | 12–8 | 21–15 |
| x-Cincinnati Royals | 42 | 38 | .525 | 16 | 23–10 | 15–19 | 4–9 | 20–16 |
| New York Knicks | 21 | 59 | .263 | 37 | 12–22 | 5–28 | 4–9 | 6–30 |

x – clinched playoff spot

=== Game log ===
1962–63 game log
| # | Date | Opponent | Score | High points | Record |
| 1 | October 16 | Chicago | 119–121 | Richie Guerin (30) | 1–0 |
| 2 | October 19 | Los Angeles | 105–116 | Richie Guerin (27) | 2–0 |
| 3 | October 20 | @ Boston | 116–149 | Guerin, Shue (20) | 2–1 |
| 4 | October 23 | Syracuse | 123–119 | Richie Guerin (33) | 2–2 |
| 5 | October 26 | Boston | 133–108 | Willie Naulls (29) | 2–3 |
| 6 | October 27 | @ St. Louis | 109–115 | Richie Guerin (37) | 2–4 |
| 7 | October 30 | @ San Francisco | 106–125 | Richie Guerin (25) | 2–5 |
| 8 | October 31 | @ Los Angeles | 95–115 | Johnny Green (28) | 2–6 |
| 9 | November 2 | @ San Francisco | 121–143 | Richie Guerin (37) | 2–7 |
| 10 | November 4 | @ Los Angeles | 106–125 | Willie Naulls (18) | 2–8 |
| 11 | November 7 | @ St. Louis | 122–112 | Richie Guerin (33) | 3–8 |
| 12 | November 9 | Cincinnati | 122–119 | Richie Guerin (33) | 3–9 |
| 13 | November 11 | N Boston | 98–117 | Gene Shue (23) | 3–10 |
| 14 | November 13 | Boston | 116–102 | Richie Guerin (23) | 3–11 |
| 15 | November 15 | @ Chicago | 92–95 | Richie Guerin (23) | 3–12 |
| 16 | November 16 | San Francisco | 127–111 | Richie Guerin (32) | 3–13 |
| 17 | November 17 | N Detroit | 113–121 (OT) | Richie Guerin (29) | 3–14 |
| 18 | November 20 | St. Louis | 95–103 | Al Butler (21) | 4–14 |
| 19 | November 21 | N Chicago | 137–108 | Richie Guerin (27) | 5–14 |
| 20 | November 23 | Syracuse | 110–116 | Willie Naulls (25) | 6–14 |
| 21 | November 24 | @ Syracuse | 126–137 | Al Butler (23) | 6–15 |
| 22 | November 27 | Cincinnati | 139–129 | Johnny Green (39) | 6–16 |
| 23 | November 28 | @ Detroit | 101–143 | Richie Guerin (14) | 6–17 |
| 24 | December 1 | N Detroit | 115–117 | Johnny Green (24) | 6–18 |
| 25 | December 4 | Los Angeles | 132–112 | Al Butler (16) | 6–19 |
| 26 | December 5 | N Chicago | 133–117 | Richie Guerin (33) | 7–19 |
| 27 | December 6 | @ Cincinnati | 99–96 | Richie Guerin (29) | 8–19 |
| 28 | December 8 | Detroit | 78–87 | Gene Shue (20) | 9–19 |
| 29 | December 11 | Boston | 87–95 | Green, Guerin (23) | 10–19 |
| 30 | December 12 | @ Detroit | 106–115 | Johnny Green (21) | 10–20 |
| 31 | December 15 | @ Chicago | 101–142 | Johnny Green (25) | 10–21 |
| 32 | December 16 | @ St. Louis | 108–115 | Richie Guerin (30) | 10–22 |
| 33 | December 18 | Cincinnati | 102–103 | Johnny Green (27) | 11–22 |
| 34 | December 22 | @ Boston | 120–106 | Richie Guerin (37) | 12–22 |
| 35 | December 25 | Syracuse | 123–111 | Richie Guerin (30) | 12–23 |
| 36 | December 27 | @ Syracuse | 92–128 | Al Butler (16) | 12–24 |
| 37 | December 29 | San Francisco | 114–109 | Richie Guerin (41) | 12–25 |
| 38 | January 1 | @ Cincinnati | 106–112 (OT) | Richie Guerin (25) | 12–26 |
| 39 | January 3 | N Syracuse | 115–123 | Johnny Green (31) | 13–26 |
| 40 | January 4 | Chicago | 108–129 | Richie Guerin (33) | 14–26 |
| 41 | January 6 | Detroit | 103–102 | Richie Guerin (29) | 14–27 |
| 42 | January 8 | N Detroit | 93–109 | Johnny Green (16) | 14–28 |
| 43 | January 9 | N St. Louis | 110–95 | Gola, Shue (16) | 14–29 |
| 44 | January 12 | @ Chicago | 97–130 | Johnny Green (19) | 14–30 |
| 45 | January 13 | @ Los Angeles | 102–108 | Green, Guerin, Hogue, Shue (16) | 14–31 |
| 46 | January 14 | @ San Francisco | 134–142 | Richie Guerin (39) | 14–32 |
| 47 | January 17 | @ San Francisco | 113–100 | Richie Guerin (27) | 15–32 |
| 48 | January 19 | @ Cincinnati | 108–114 | Gene Shue (27) | 15–33 |
| 49 | January 22 | Boston | 124–100 | Richie Guerin (27) | 15–34 |
| 50 | January 25 | Cincinnati | 114–112 | Richie Guerin (36) | 15–35 |
| 51 | January 27 | @ Boston | 110–123 | Richie Guerin (20) | 15–36 |
| 52 | January 29 | San Francisco | 123–103 | Richie Guerin (22) | 15–37 |
| 53 | January 30 | N Los Angeles | 115–116 | Al Butler (26) | 15–38 |
| 54 | January 31 | N Chicago | 101–116 | Johnny Green (24) | 15–39 |
| 55 | February 3 | Los Angeles | 95–122 | Tom Gola (23) | 16–39 |
| 56 | February 5 | Syracuse | 120–100 | Johnny Green (36) | 16–40 |
| 57 | February 8 | Boston | 129–97 | Al Butler (22) | 16–41 |
| 58 | February 9 | N Syracuse | 122–116 | Richie Guerin (28) | 16–42 |
| 59 | February 10 | @ Boston | 123–129 | Johnny Green (25) | 16–43 |
| 60 | February 13 | St. Louis | 103–102 | Al Butler (27) | 16–44 |
| 61 | February 14 | N St. Louis | 113–123 | Al Butler (27) | 17–44 |
| 62 | February 15 | @ Chicago | 135–131 (2OT) | Johnny Green (38) | 18–44 |
| 63 | February 17 | Cincinnati | 109–98 | Dave Budd (23) | 18–45 |
| 64 | February 19 | Detroit | 121–112 | Johnny Green (24) | 18–46 |
| 65 | February 21 | @ Cincinnati | 96–115 | Johnny Green (27) | 18–47 |
| 66 | February 22 | San Francisco | 93–106 | Richie Guerin (28) | 19–47 |
| 67 | February 24 | @ Syracuse | 126–143 | Budd, Green (18) | 19–48 |
| 68 | February 26 | Los Angeles | 116–125 | Richie Guerin (32) | 20–48 |
| 69 | February 27 | @ Cincinnati | 107–119 | Richie Guerin (21) | 20–49 |
| 70 | February 28 | N Syracuse | 132–124 | Johnny Green (26) | 20–50 |
| 71 | March 2 | @ Boston | 117–122 | Bevo Nordmann (18) | 20–51 |
| 72 | March 3 | Boston | 102–95 | Al Butler (17) | 20–52 |
| 73 | March 5 | Syracuse | 131–121 | Richie Guerin (31) | 20–53 |
| 74 | March 7 | @ Syracuse | 118–129 | Richie Guerin (29) | 20–54 |
| 75 | March 8 | St. Louis | 129–124 | Richie Guerin (34) | 20–55 |
| 76 | March 10 | @ St. Louis | 120–132 | Bevo Nordmann (30) | 20–56 |
| 77 | March 12 | Cincinnati | 110–96 | Richie Guerin (22) | 20–57 |
| 78 | March 13 | @ Detroit | 89–112 | Richie Guerin (23) | 20–58 |
| 79 | March 15 | Chicago | 111–116 | Dave Budd (22) | 21–58 |
| 80 | March 17 | @ Cincinnati | 109–116 | Richie Guerin (23) | 21–59 |
