= 1962–63 Los Angeles Lakers season =

Season of National Basketball Association team the Los Angeles Lakers

- Division champions
- Head coach: Fred Schaus
- Arena: Los Angeles Memorial Sports Arena

Results
- Record: 53–27 (.663)
- Place: Division: 1st (Western)
- Playoff finish: NBA Finals (lost to Celtics 2–4)
- Stats at Basketball Reference

Local media
- Television: KHJ-TV
- Radio: KHJ

The 1962–63 Los Angeles Lakers season was the Lakers' 15th season in the NBA and third season in Los Angeles.

== Roster ==
1962–63 Los Angeles Lakers roster
Players

Pos.	No.	Player	Height	Weight	DOB	From
SG	5	Dick Barnett	6 ft 4 in (1.93 m)	190 lb (86 kg)	1936-10-02	Tennessee State
SF	22	Elgin Baylor	6 ft 5 in (1.96 m)	225 lb (102 kg)	1934-09-16	Seattle
C	25	Leroy Ellis	6 ft 11 in (2.11 m)	210 lb (95 kg)	1940-03-10	St. John's
SF	24	Ron Horn	6 ft 7 in (2.01 m)	220 lb (100 kg)	1938-05-24	Indiana
SG	33	Hot Rod Hundley	6 ft 4 in (1.93 m)	185 lb (84 kg)	1934-10-26	West Virginia
PF	54	Howie Jolliff	6 ft 7 in (2.01 m)	218 lb (99 kg)	1938-07-20	Ohio
C	32	Jim Krebs	6 ft 8 in (2.03 m)	230 lb (104 kg)	1935-09-08	SMU
PF	35	Rudy LaRusso	6 ft 7 in (2.01 m)	220 lb (100 kg)	1937-11-11	Dartmouth
SG	11	Frank Selvy	6 ft 3 in (1.91 m)	180 lb (82 kg)	1932-11-09	Furman
PG	44	Jerry West	6 ft 3 in (1.91 m)	175 lb (79 kg)	1938-05-28	West Virginia
C	12	Gene Wiley	6 ft 10 in (2.08 m)	210 lb (95 kg)	1937-11-12	Wichita State

Coaches
Head coach
- Fred Schaus

Legend
- (DP) Unsigned draft pick
- (FA) Free agent
- (S) Suspended
- Injured

Roster
Updated: September 14, 1962

== Regular season ==
=== Season standings ===
Western Division	W	L	PCT	GB	Home	Road	Neutral	Div
x-Los Angeles Lakers	53	27	.663	–	27–7	20–17	6–3	33–13
x-St. Louis Hawks	48	32	.600	5	30–7	13–18	5–7	29–17
x-Detroit Pistons	34	46	.425	19	14–16	8–19	12–11	19–27
San Francisco Warriors	31	49	.388	22	13–20	11–25	7–4	18–28
Chicago Zephyrs	25	55	.313	28	17–17	3–23	5–15	13–27

x – clinched playoff spot

=== Game log ===
1962–63 game log
#	Date	Opponent	Score	High points	Record
1	October 16	N Detroit	122–106	Elgin Baylor (35)	1–0
2	October 19	@ New York	105–116	Elgin Baylor (36)	1–1
3	October 20	@ Syracuse	102–108	Elgin Baylor (42)	1–2
4	October 23	@ Cincinnati	115–116	Jerry West (32)	1–3
5	October 24	@ Chicago	107–118	Jerry West (25)	1–4
6	October 27	Detroit	118–134	Elgin Baylor (31)	2–4
7	October 31	New York	95–115	Jerry West (35)	3–4
8	November 3	San Francisco	115–127	Jerry West (49)	4–4
9	November 4	New York	106–125	Elgin Baylor (29)	5–4
10	November 7	@ San Francisco	132–108	Elgin Baylor (30)	6–4
11	November 9	@ Boston	133–120	Elgin Baylor (41)	7–4
12	November 10	@ St. Louis	96–97	Jerry West (27)	7–5
13	November 11	Chicago	109–105 (OT)	Elgin Baylor (42)	7–6
14	November 13	Chicago	84–107	Jerry West (27)	8–6
15	November 15	N Syracuse	120–98	Elgin Baylor (24)	8–7
16	November 17	@ Chicago	110–109	Elgin Baylor (39)	9–7
17	November 18	@ Detroit	116–98	Elgin Baylor (36)	10–7
18	November 22	Cincinnati	110–134	Elgin Baylor (33)	11–7
19	November 23	@ San Francisco	129–124	Elgin Baylor (36)	12–7
20	November 24	Cincinnati	123–129	Elgin Baylor (42)	13–7
21	November 26	Chicago	106–128	Jerry West (33)	14–7
22	November 28	St. Louis	110–116	Elgin Baylor (40)	15–7
23	December 1	St. Louis	97–110	Jerry West (46)	16–7
24	December 4	@ New York	132–112	Elgin Baylor (43)	17–7
25	December 7	@ Boston	112–126	Elgin Baylor (33)	17–8
26	December 8	@ Cincinnati	131–128 (OT)	Elgin Baylor (33)	18–8
27	December 9	N Syracuse	117–114	Elgin Baylor (34)	18–9
28	December 11	N Cincinnati	124–121	Elgin Baylor (42)	19–9
29	December 12	Syracuse	120–126	Elgin Baylor (50)	20–9
30	December 14	@ San Francisco	120–118	Elgin Baylor (51)	21–9
31	December 15	San Francisco	104–113	Elgin Baylor (52)	22–9
32	December 17	Syracuse	114–121	Elgin Baylor (42)	23–9
33	December 19	St. Louis	106–135	Elgin Baylor (37)	24–9
34	December 21	St. Louis	105–100	Elgin Baylor (48)	24–10
35	December 26	@ St. Louis	104–106	Elgin Baylor (34)	24–11
36	December 29	@ Syracuse	132–123	Elgin Baylor (32)	25–11
37	December 30	@ Detroit	135–130	Elgin Baylor (38)	26–11
38	January 4	Boston	123–125	Frank Selvy (36)	27–11
39	January 5	Boston	104–106	Jerry West (27)	28–11
40	January 6	@ Cincinnati	120–119 (OT)	Jerry West (32)	29–11
41	January 8	@ St. Louis	99–96	Elgin Baylor (28)	30–11
42	January 9	@ Detroit	123–115	Jerry West (40)	31–11
43	January 11	@ San Francisco	134–129	Jerry West (38)	32–11
44	January 12	San Francisco	114–119	Jerry West (33)	33–11
45	January 13	New York	102–108	Jerry West (33)	34–11
46	January 18	@ Chicago	116–108	Elgin Baylor (37)	35–11
47	January 20	@ Boston	121–133	Elgin Baylor (40)	35–12
48	January 21	Detroit	94–124	Dick Barnett (28)	36–12
49	January 23	Detroit	119–123	Elgin Baylor (42)	37–12
50	January 25	N Syracuse	114–122	Elgin Baylor (39)	38–12
51	January 27	@ St. Louis	105–101	Barnett, Baylor (30)	39–12
52	January 30	N New York	115–116	Elgin Baylor (37)	40–12
53	January 31	N Detroit	127–122	Elgin Baylor (49)	41–12
54	February 1	@ Detroit	119–109	Elgin Baylor (36)	42–12
55	February 2	@ St. Louis	103–97	Jerry West (31)	43–12
56	February 3	@ New York	95–122	Elgin Baylor (21)	43–13
57	February 6	Chicago	105–107	Elgin Baylor (29)	44–13
58	February 8	Chicago	91–94	Dick Barnett (32)	45–13
59	February 9	@ Chicago	107–106	Elgin Baylor (38)	46–13
60	February 10	@ Cincinnati	107–124	Elgin Baylor (42)	46–14
61	February 12	N Boston	93–120	Elgin Baylor (35)	46–15
62	February 13	@ Boston	134–128	Elgin Baylor (50)	47–15
63	February 14	Detroit	111–128	Elgin Baylor (41)	48–15
64	February 16	San Francisco	122–118 (2OT)	Elgin Baylor (46)	48–16
65	February 19	@ San Francisco	109–111	Elgin Baylor (42)	48–17
66	February 22	Boston	105–113	Dick Barnett (36)	49–17
67	February 24	Boston	119–109	Elgin Baylor (25)	49–18
68	February 25	N Detroit	113–107	Elgin Baylor (49)	50–18
69	February 26	@ New York	116–125	Dick Barnett (36)	50–19
70	February 27	@ Syracuse	111–122	Elgin Baylor (42)	50–20
71	March 1	@ Chicago	109–114	Elgin Baylor (33)	50–21
72	March 2	San Francisco	122–113	Dick Barnett (35)	50–22
73	March 4	Cincinnati	114–111	Dick Barnett (37)	50–23
74	March 6	Cincinnati	97–106	Elgin Baylor (38)	51–23
75	March 9	@ St. Louis	101–117	Elgin Baylor (46)	51–24
76	March 10	@ Detroit	116–124	Dick Barnett (27)	51–25
77	March 11	St. Louis	96–109	Baylor, Selvy (20)	52–25
78	March 12	@ San Francisco	110–116	Elgin Baylor (32)	52–26
79	March 13	St. Louis	112–98	Elgin Baylor (35)	52–27
80	March 16	San Francisco	105–111 (OT)	Elgin Baylor (37)	53–27

== Playoffs ==
1963 playoff game log
Division finals: 4–3 (home: 4–0; road: 0–3)

Game	Date	Team	Score	High points	High rebounds	High assists	Location Attendance	Series
1	March 31	St. Louis	W 112–104	Jerry West (27)	Elgin Baylor (12)	Elgin Baylor (8)	Los Angeles Memorial Sports Arena; 10,086	1–0
2	April 2	St. Louis	W 101–99	Elgin Baylor (29)	three players tied (14)	Baylor, Selvy (6)	Los Angeles Memorial Sports Arena; 11,225	2–0
3	April 4	@ St. Louis	L 112–125	Elgin Baylor (34)	Elgin Baylor (12)	three players tied (2)	Kiel Auditorium; 7,396	2–1
4	April 6	@ St. Louis	L 114–124	Jerry West (33)	Baylor, Ellis (13)	three players tied (2)	Kiel Auditorium; 10,614	2–2
5	April 7	St. Louis	W 123–96	Elgin Baylor (37)	Baylor, Wiley (13)	—	Los Angeles Memorial Sports Arena; 15,212	3–2
6	April 9	@ St. Louis	L 113–121	Elgin Baylor (39)	Rudy LaRusso (11)	Jerry West (4)	Kiel Auditorium; 8,110	3–3
7	April 11	St. Louis	W 115–100	Elgin Baylor (35)	Elgin Baylor (15)	Baylor, West (7)	Los Angeles Memorial Sports Arena; 14,864	4–3

NBA Finals: 2–4 (home: 1–2; road: 1–2)

Game	Date	Team	Score	High points	High rebounds	High assists	Location Attendance	Series
1	April 14	@ Boston	L 114–117	Elgin Baylor (33)	Rudy LaRusso (14)	three players tied (5)	Boston Garden; 13,909	0–1
2	April 16	@ Boston	L 106–113	Elgin Baylor (30)	Rudy LaRusso (12)	Elgin Baylor (4)	Boston Garden; 13,909	0–2
3	April 17	Boston	W 119–99	Jerry West (42)	Elgin Baylor (23)	Elgin Baylor (8)	Los Angeles Memorial Sports Arena; 15,493	1–2
4	April 19	Boston	L 105–108	Elgin Baylor (31)	Elgin Baylor (19)	Jerry West (5)	Los Angeles Memorial Sports Arena; 16,382	1–3
5	April 21	@ Boston	W 126–119	Elgin Baylor (43)	Elgin Baylor (20)	Jerry West (6)	Boston Garden; 13,909	2–3
6	April 24	Boston	L 109–112	Jerry West (32)	Gene Wiley (14)	Jerry West (9)	Los Angeles Memorial Sports Arena; 15,652	2–4

1963 schedule

== Awards and records ==
- Elgin Baylor, All-NBA First Team
- Jerry West, All-NBA First Team
- Elgin Baylor, NBA All-Star Game
- Jerry West, NBA All-Star Game
- Rudy LaRusso, NBA All-Star Game
