= 1962–63 Chicago Zephyrs season =

NBA professional basketball team season

- Head coach: Jack McMahon (fired) (12–26); Bobby Leonard (13–29)
- General manager: Frank Lane
- Owner: David Trager
- Arena: Chicago Coliseum

Results
- Record: 25–55 (.313)
- Place: Division: 5th (Western)
- Playoff finish: Did not qualify
- Stats at Basketball Reference

Local media
- Television: none
- Radio: WFMQ (Jim Karvellas)

The 1962–63 Chicago Zephyrs season was the Zephyrs' 2nd season in the NBA, as well as their only season under the Zephyrs name after going under the Packers name the previous season and their final season in the Windy City before the franchise's relocation to Baltimore as a new Baltimore Bullets team for the following season. As a result, Chicago would not have another NBA franchise until 1966, when the Bulls began play.

== Roster ==
1962–63 Chicago Zephyrs roster
Players

Pos.	No.	Player	Height	Weight	DOB	From
C	8	Walt Bellamy	6 ft 11 in (2.11 m)	225 lb (102 kg)	1939-07-24	Indiana
SF	35	Barney Cable	6 ft 7 in (2.01 m)	175 lb (79 kg)	1935-07-29	Bradley
SG	25	Johnny Cox	6 ft 4 in (1.93 m)	180 lb (82 kg)	1936-11-01	Kentucky
SF	43	Terry Dischinger	6 ft 7 in (2.01 m)	189 lb (86 kg)	1940-11-21	Purdue
SG	22	Al Ferrari	6 ft 4 in (1.93 m)	190 lb (86 kg)	1933-07-06	Michigan State
PG	16	Si Green	6 ft 2 in (1.88 m)	185 lb (84 kg)	1933-08-20	Duquesne
PF	52, 54	Charles Hardnett	6 ft 8 in (2.03 m)	225 lb (102 kg)	1938-09-13	Grambling State
PG	22	Maurice King	6 ft 2 in (1.88 m)	195 lb (88 kg)	1935-03-12	Kansas
PG	21	Slick Leonard	6 ft 3 in (1.91 m)	185 lb (84 kg)	1932-07-17	Indiana
SG	23	Nick Mantis	6 ft 3 in (1.91 m)	190 lb (86 kg)	1935-12-07	Northwestern
SF	44	Don Nelson	6 ft 6 in (1.98 m)	210 lb (95 kg)	1940-05-15	Iowa
SG	20	Mel Nowell	6 ft 2 in (1.88 m)	170 lb (77 kg)	1939-12-27	Ohio State
PF	14	Larry Staverman	6 ft 7 in (2.01 m)	205 lb (93 kg)	1936-10-11	Thomas More

Coaches
Head coach
- Jack McMahon (fired)
- Slick Leonard

Legend
- (DP) Unsigned draft pick
- (FA) Free agent
- (S) Suspended
- Injured

Roster
Updated: January 30, 1963

== Regular season ==
=== Season standings ===
Western Division	W	L	PCT	GB	Home	Road	Neutral	Div
x-Los Angeles Lakers	53	27	.663	–	27–7	20–17	6–3	33–13
x-St. Louis Hawks	48	32	.600	5	30–7	13–18	5–7	29–17
x-Detroit Pistons	34	46	.425	19	14–16	8–19	12–11	19–27
San Francisco Warriors	31	49	.388	22	13–20	11–25	7–4	18–28
Chicago Zephyrs	25	55	.313	28	17–17	3–23	5–15	13–27

=== Game log ===
1962–63 game log
#	Date	Opponent	Score	High points	Record
1	October 16	@ New York	119–121	Walt Bellamy (43)	0–1
2	October 20	Cincinnati	109–113	Walt Bellamy (23)	1–1
3	October 23	N St. Louis	110–109	Walt Bellamy (33)	1–2
4	October 24	Los Angeles	107–118	Walt Bellamy (42)	2–2
5	October 26	@ Syracuse	112–130	Walt Bellamy (30)	2–3
6	October 27	San Francisco	129–126 (OT)	Walt Bellamy (29)	2–4
7	November 2	Boston	107–97	Walt Bellamy (35)	2–5
8	November 3	@ St. Louis	109–114	Terry Dischinger (33)	2–6
9	November 9	@ San Francisco	126–134	Walt Bellamy (46)	2–7
10	November 10	@ San Francisco	108–113	Walt Bellamy (29)	2–8
11	November 11	@ Los Angeles	109–105 (OT)	Terry Dischinger (30)	3–8
12	November 13	@ Los Angeles	84–107	Bobby Leonard (17)	3–9
13	November 15	New York	92–95	Walt Bellamy (37)	4–9
14	November 17	Los Angeles	110–109	Terry Dischinger (31)	4–10
15	November 18	N Syracuse	110–107	Woody Sauldsberry (26)	4–11
16	November 20	N Boston	106–113	Don Nelson (25)	4–12
17	November 21	N New York	137–108	Terry Dischinger (37)	4–13
18	November 23	N Boston	104–116	Terry Dischinger (32)	4–14
19	November 24	Detroit	103–104	Walt Bellamy (31)	5–14
20	November 26	@ Los Angeles	106–128	Walt Bellamy (26)	5–15
21	November 27	@ San Francisco	115–107	Walt Bellamy (37)	6–15
22	November 29	Syracuse	112–85	Walt Bellamy (23)	6–16
23	December 1	Cincinnati	131–121	Terry Dischinger (33)	6–17
24	December 4	@ St. Louis	102–104	Walt Bellamy (21)	6–18
25	December 5	N New York	133–117	Bill McGill (28)	6–19
26	December 6	St. Louis	93–106	Woody Sauldsberry (23)	7–19
27	December 7	N Syracuse	149–129	Walt Bellamy (34)	7–20
28	December 9	San Francisco	102–110	Terry Dischinger (33)	8–20
29	December 10	N Detroit	109–100	Walt Bellamy (36)	8–21
30	December 12	N Cincinnati	102–105	Walt Bellamy (31)	9–21
31	December 13	N Cincinnati	142–123	Terry Dischinger (28)	9–22
32	December 15	New York	101–142	Bill McGill (31)	10–22
33	December 16	N Detroit	106–110	Terry Dischinger (33)	11–22
34	December 18	N Detroit	110–113	Johnny Cox (29)	12–22
35	December 19	@ Detroit	113–115	Walt Bellamy (30)	12–23
36	December 21	@ Cincinnati	116–129	Walt Bellamy (18)	12–24
37	December 22	N Detroit	122–110	Walt Bellamy (26)	12–25
38	December 26	Detroit	123–116	Walt Bellamy (31)	12–26
39	December 29	Cincinnati	104–108	Walt Bellamy (25)	13–26
40	December 30	St. Louis	107–100	Walt Bellamy (31)	13–27
41	January 4	@ New York	108–129	Walt Bellamy (23)	13–28
42	January 5	San Francisco	127–126	Walt Bellamy (38)	13–29
43	January 6	@ Syracuse	102–114	Charles Hardnett (31)	13–30
44	January 9	Boston	123–131	Charles Hardnett (35)	14–30
45	January 11	@ Detroit	112–116	Terry Dischinger (24)	14–31
46	January 12	New York	97–130	Terry Dischinger (30)	15–31
47	January 13	@ Boston	99–143	Walt Bellamy (24)	15–32
48	January 17	N Boston	93–110	Walt Bellamy (33)	15–33
49	January 18	Los Angeles	116–108	Walt Bellamy (38)	15–34
50	January 20	Cincinnati	93–113	Walt Bellamy (28)	16–34
51	January 23	Syracuse	94–104	Walt Bellamy (35)	17–34
52	January 25	Detroit	113–111	Walt Bellamy (36)	17–35
53	January 26	@ Cincinnati	116–142	Terry Dischinger (23)	17–36
54	January 27	N Cincinnati	143–126	Walt Bellamy (39)	17–37
55	January 29	N Boston	99–100	Walt Bellamy (33)	17–38
56	January 31	N New York	101–116	Walt Bellamy (34)	18–38
57	February 1	St. Louis	119–111	Terry Dischinger (32)	18–39
58	February 3	@ San Francisco	110–108	Terry Dischinger (25)	19–39
59	February 4	N San Francisco	109–107	Terry Dischinger (24)	19–40
60	February 6	@ Los Angeles	105–107	Terry Dischinger (34)	19–41
61	February 8	@ Los Angeles	91–94	Walt Bellamy (28)	19–42
62	February 9	Los Angeles	107–106	Walt Bellamy (36)	19–43
63	February 14	@ Syracuse	117–136	Terry Dischinger (27)	19–44
64	February 15	New York	135–131 (2OT)	Terry Dischinger (30)	19–45
65	February 17	Boston	110–107	Walt Bellamy (32)	19–46
66	February 19	N Syracuse	118–110	Walt Bellamy (31)	19–47
67	February 21	Syracuse	91–108	Walt Bellamy (31)	20–47
68	February 22	@ St. Louis	98–115	Terry Dischinger (29)	20–48
69	February 23	San Francisco	92–88	Walt Bellamy (29)	20–49
70	February 27	St. Louis	93–98	Walt Bellamy (29)	21–49
71	February 28	@ Detroit	104–112	Bellamy, Dischinger (28)	21–50
72	March 1	Los Angeles	109–114	Walt Bellamy (38)	22–50
73	March 3	@ St. Louis	97–104	Terry Dischinger (33)	22–51
74	March 5	St. Louis	93–116	Walt Bellamy (27)	23–51
75	March 6	N San Francisco	111–121	Terry Dischinger (27)	24–51
76	March 8	Boston	109–110	Walt Bellamy (39)	25–51
77	March 12	Syracuse	130–106	Terry Dischinger (27)	25–52
78	March 13	@ Boston	108–121	Walt Bellamy (28)	25–53
79	March 15	@ New York	111–116	Walt Bellamy (34)	25–54
80	March 16	Cincinnati	126–117	Charles Hardnett (27)	25–55

== Awards and records ==
- Terry Dischinger, NBA Rookie of the Year Award
- Terry Dischinger, NBA All-Rookie Team 1st Team
