= 1962–63 San Francisco Warriors season =

NBA professional basketball team season

- Head coach: Bob Feerick
- Arena: Cow Palace

Results
- Record: 31–49 (.388)
- Place: Division: 4th (Western)
- Playoff finish: Did not qualify
- Stats at Basketball Reference

Local media
- Television: KTVU (Bill King)
- Radio: KFRC(King)

The 1962–63 San Francisco Warriors season was the Warriors' 17th season in the NBA and 1st in the San Francisco Bay Area. During the start of their regular season, they began with a 7–3 record (including three straight overtime games from October 26–28) before having an eleven-game losing streak from late November to early December that they would never recover from.

== Roster ==
San Francisco Warriors roster
Players

Pos.	No.	Player	Height	Weight	DOB	From
G	16	Al Attles	6 ft 0 in (1.83 m)	175 lb (79 kg)		North Carolina A&T
C	13	Wilt Chamberlain	7 ft 1 in (2.16 m)	275 lb (125 kg)		Kansas
F	17	Dave Fedor	6 ft 6 in (1.98 m)	190 lb (86 kg)		Florida State
F	11	Dave Gunther	6 ft 7 in (2.01 m)	190 lb (86 kg)		Iowa
F	55	Wayne Hightower	6 ft 8 in (2.03 m)	192 lb (87 kg)		Kansas
G/F	12	Fred LaCour	6 ft 5 in (1.96 m)	210 lb (95 kg)		San Francisco
G/F	9	George Lee	6 ft 4 in (1.93 m)	200 lb (91 kg)		Michigan
F	12	Ted Luckenbill	6 ft 6 in (1.98 m)	205 lb (93 kg)		Houston
F	14	Tom Meschery	6 ft 6 in (1.98 m)	215 lb (98 kg)		Saint Mary's
F	43	Howie Montgomery	6 ft 5 in (1.96 m)	220 lb (100 kg)		Texas–Pan American
F	71	Willie Naulls	6 ft 6 in (1.98 m)	225 lb (102 kg)		UCLA
G	34	Gary Phillips	6 ft 3 in (1.91 m)	189 lb (86 kg)		Houston
G	5	Guy Rodgers	6 ft 0 in (1.83 m)	185 lb (84 kg)		Temple
F	17	Kenny Sears	6 ft 9 in (2.06 m)	198 lb (90 kg)		Santa Clara
G	7	Hubie White	6 ft 4 in (1.93 m)	205 lb (93 kg)		Villanova

Coaches
Head coach
- Bob Feerick (Santa Clara)

Legend
- (DP) Unsigned draft pick
- (FA) Free agent
- (S) Suspended
- Injured

== Regular season ==
=== Season standings ===
Western Division	W	L	PCT	GB	Home	Road	Neutral	Div
x-Los Angeles Lakers	53	27	.663	–	27–7	20–17	6–3	33–13
x-St. Louis Hawks	48	32	.600	5	30–7	13–18	5–7	29–17
x-Detroit Pistons	34	46	.425	19	14–16	8–19	12–11	19–27
San Francisco Warriors	31	49	.388	22	13–20	11–25	7–4	18–28
Chicago Zephyrs	25	55	.313	28	17–17	3–23	5–15	13–27

x – clinched playoff spot

=== Game log ===
1962–63 Game log
#	Date	Opponent	Score	High points	Record
1	October 23	Detroit	113–140	Wilt Chamberlain (56)	1–0
2	October 26	Detroit	131–132 (OT)	Wilt Chamberlain (50)	2–0
3	October 27	@ Chicago	129–126 (OT)	Wilt Chamberlain (46)	3–0
4	October 28	@ Cincinnati	130–131 (OT)	Wilt Chamberlain (53)	3–1
5	October 30	New York	106–125	Wilt Chamberlain (59)	4–1
6	November 2	New York	121–143	Wilt Chamberlain (44)	5–1
7	November 3	@ Los Angeles	115–127	Wilt Chamberlain (72)	5–2
8	November 7	Los Angeles	132–108	Wilt Chamberlain (38)	5–3
9	November 9	Chicago	126–134	Wilt Chamberlain (54)	6–3
10	November 10	Chicago	108–113	Wilt Chamberlain (57)	7–3
11	November 13	@ St. Louis	100–132	Wilt Chamberlain (45)	7–4
12	November 14	@ Detroit	115–123	Wilt Chamberlain (49)	7–5
13	November 16	@ New York	127–111	Wilt Chamberlain (73)	8–5
14	November 17	@ Boston	109–127	Wilt Chamberlain (45)	8–6
15	November 18	@ Cincinnati	120–132	Wilt Chamberlain (59)	8–7
16	November 21	Cincinnati	143–139	Wilt Chamberlain (61)	8–8
17	November 23	Los Angeles	129–124	Wilt Chamberlain (53)	8–9
18	November 25	Cincinnati	128–115	Wilt Chamberlain (41)	8–10
19	November 27	Chicago	115–107	Wilt Chamberlain (37)	8–11
20	November 29	St. Louis	128–121	Wilt Chamberlain (53)	8–12
21	December 2	St. Louis	122–116	Wilt Chamberlain (59)	8–13
22	December 7	@ Detroit	116–123	Wilt Chamberlain (51)	8–14
23	December 8	@ St. Louis	129–145	Wilt Chamberlain (39)	8–15
24	December 9	@ Chicago	102–110	Wilt Chamberlain (29)	8–16
25	December 11	Syracuse	124–136	Wilt Chamberlain (61)	9–16
26	December 14	Los Angeles	120–118	Wilt Chamberlain (63)	9–17
27	December 15	@ Los Angeles	104–113	Wilt Chamberlain (24)	9–18
28	December 16	Syracuse	144–137	Wilt Chamberlain (43)	9–19
29	December 18	St. Louis	110–130	Wilt Chamberlain (61)	10–19
30	December 21	@ Detroit	122–113	Wilt Chamberlain (52)	11–19
31	December 22	@ Syracuse	123–118	Wilt Chamberlain (39)	12–19
32	December 25	N St. Louis	91–94	Wilt Chamberlain (32)	13–19
33	December 26	@ Boston	113–116	Wilt Chamberlain (43)	13–20
34	December 27	N Boston	102–108	Wilt Chamberlain (32)	13–21
35	December 28	N Syracuse	117–124	Wilt Chamberlain (36)	14–21
36	December 29	@ New York	114–109	Wilt Chamberlain (33)	15–21
37	January 2	Boston	135–120 (OT)	Chamberlain, Lee (23)	15–22
38	January 4	@ Cincinnati	129–130	Wilt Chamberlain (45)	15–23
39	January 5	@ Chicago	127–126	Wilt Chamberlain (50)	16–23
40	January 6	@ St. Louis	103–114	Wilt Chamberlain (41)	16–24
41	January 8	Boston	118–112	Wilt Chamberlain (45)	16–25
42	January 11	Los Angeles	134–129	Wilt Chamberlain (67)	16–26
43	January 12	@ Los Angeles	114–119	Wilt Chamberlain (40)	16–27
44	January 14	New York	134–142	Wilt Chamberlain (48)	17–27
45	January 17	New York	113–100	Wilt Chamberlain (28)	17–28
46	January 19	@ St. Louis	114–116	Wilt Chamberlain (35)	17–29
47	January 20	@ St. Louis	115–116	Wayne Hightower (28)	17–30
48	January 22	Detroit	115–107	Wilt Chamberlain (39)	17–31
49	January 24	N Detroit	138–114	Wilt Chamberlain (58)	18–31
50	January 26	Syracuse	116–110	Wilt Chamberlain (35)	18–32
51	January 27	Syracuse	119–110	Wilt Chamberlain (40)	18–33
52	January 29	@ New York	123–103	Wilt Chamberlain (62)	19–33
53	January 30	@ Boston	111–125	Wilt Chamberlain (50)	19–34
54	February 1	N Cincinnati	133–126	Wilt Chamberlain (44)	20–34
55	February 3	Chicago	110–108	Wilt Chamberlain (34)	20–35
56	February 4	N Chicago	109–107	Wilt Chamberlain (36)	21–35
57	February 6	@ Detroit	117–116	Wilt Chamberlain (48)	22–35
58	February 7	@ Cincinnati	129–134	Wilt Chamberlain (56)	22–36
59	February 9	@ Boston	112–118	Wilt Chamberlain (31)	22–37
60	February 10	@ Syracuse	115–139	Wilt Chamberlain (29)	22–38
61	February 12	@ Detroit	115–120	Wilt Chamberlain (46)	22–39
62	February 13	Detroit	134–132 (OT)	Wilt Chamberlain (51)	22–40
63	February 16	@ Los Angeles	122–118 (2OT)	Wilt Chamberlain (56)	23–40
64	February 19	Los Angeles	109–111	Wilt Chamberlain (39)	24–40
65	February 21	Boston	135–118	Wilt Chamberlain (40)	24–41
66	February 22	@ New York	93–106	Wilt Chamberlain (37)	24–42
67	February 23	@ Chicago	92–88	Wilt Chamberlain (34)	25–42
68	February 24	@ St. Louis	106–127	Tom Meschery (34)	25–43
69	February 26	Boston	112–128	Wilt Chamberlain (34)	26–43
70	March 1	N Cincinnati	132–125	Wilt Chamberlain (54)	27–43
71	March 2	@ Los Angeles	122–113	Wilt Chamberlain (49)	28–43
72	March 3	Cincinnati	122–123	Wilt Chamberlain (45)	29–43
73	March 5	N Detroit	102–111	Wilt Chamberlain (25)	29–44
74	March 6	N Chicago	111–121	Wilt Chamberlain (51)	29–45
75	March 8	N Detroit	123–131 (OT)	Wilt Chamberlain (51)	29–46
76	March 10	@ Syracuse	148–163	Wilt Chamberlain (70)	29–47
77	March 12	Los Angeles	110–116	Wilt Chamberlain (42)	30–47
78	March 14	St. Louis	114–109	Wilt Chamberlain (39)	30–48
79	March 15	N St. Louis	108–119	Wilt Chamberlain (38)	31–48
80	March 16	@ Los Angeles	105–111 (OT)	Wilt Chamberlain (40)	31–49

== Awards and records ==
- Wilt Chamberlain, NBA All-Star Game
- Tom Meschery, NBA All-Star Game
- Wilt Chamberlain, NBA Scoring Champion
- Wilt Chamberlain, All-NBA Second Team
