= 1962–63 St. Louis Hawks season =

NBA professional basketball team season

- Head coach: Harry Gallatin
- Arena: Kiel Auditorium

Results
- Record: 48–32 (.600)
- Place: Division: 2nd (Western)
- Playoff finish: West Division Finals (Eliminated 3–4)
- Stats at Basketball Reference

Local media
- Television: KPLR-TV
- Radio: KMOX

The 1962–63 St. Louis Hawks season was the Hawks' 14th season in the NBA and eighth season in St. Louis.

== Regular season ==
=== Season standings ===
Western Division	W	L	PCT	GB	Home	Road	Neutral	Div
x-Los Angeles Lakers	53	27	.663	–	27–7	20–17	6–3	33–13
x-St. Louis Hawks	48	32	.600	5	30–7	13–18	5–7	29–17
x-Detroit Pistons	34	46	.425	19	14–16	8–19	12–11	19–27
San Francisco Warriors	31	49	.388	22	13–20	11–25	7–4	18–28
Chicago Zephyrs	25	55	.313	28	17–17	3–23	5–15	13–27

x – clinched playoff spot

=== Game log ===
1962–63 Game log
#	Date	Opponent	Score	High points	Record
1	October 20	Detroit	111–120	Bob Pettit (27)	1–0
2	October 23	vs. Chicago	110–109	Bob Pettit (23)	2–0
3	October 24	Cincinnati	114–121	John Barnhill (20)	3–0
4	October 26	@ Cincinnati	102–118	Bob Pettit (28)	3–1
5	October 27	New York	109–115	John Barnhill (29)	4–1
6	October 30	Boston	97–98	Bob Pettit (26)	5–1
7	October 31	vs. Syracuse	126–108	Bob Pettit (29)	5–2
8	November 3	Chicago	109–114	Jordon, Pettit (26)	6–2
9	November 7	New York	122–112	Bob Pettit (37)	6–3
10	November 9	@ Syracuse	93–101	John Barnhill (21)	6–4
11	November 10	Los Angeles	96–97	Bob Pettit (33)	7–4
12	November 11	Detroit	100–117	Cliff Hagan (29)	8–4
13	November 13	San Francisco	100–132	Bob Pettit (25)	9–4
14	November 16	@ Cincinnati	111–120	Lenny Wilkens (28)	9–5
15	November 17	Syracuse	107–113	Jordon, Pettit (23)	10–5
16	November 20	@ New York	95–103	Bob Pettit (19)	10–6
17	November 21	@ Boston	106–115	Bob Pettit (30)	10–7
18	November 22	Detroit	91–106	Bob Pettit (31)	11–7
19	November 23	@ Detroit	121–93	Bob Pettit (35)	12–7
20	November 24	Boston	95–97	Bob Pettit (36)	13–7
21	November 27	Syracuse	105–120	Bob Pettit (34)	14–7
22	November 28	@ Los Angeles	110–116	Bob Pettit (30)	14–8
23	November 29	@ San Francisco	128–121	Bob Pettit (45)	15–8
24	December 1	@ Los Angeles	97–110	Bob Pettit (41)	15–9
25	December 2	@ San Francisco	122–116	Cliff Hagan (43)	16–9
26	December 4	Chicago	102–104	Bob Pettit (21)	17–9
27	December 6	@ Chicago	93–106	Bob Pettit (23)	17–10
28	December 8	San Francisco	129–145	Bob Pettit (26)	18–10
29	December 9	vs. Detroit	119–123	Bob Pettit (33)	18–11
30	December 12	@ Boston	98–111	Bob Pettit (33)	18–12
31	December 15	@ Detroit	112–94	Bob Pettit (31)	19–12
32	December 16	New York	108–115	John Barnhill (22)	20–12
33	December 18	@ San Francisco	110–130	Cliff Hagan (19)	20–13
34	December 19	@ Los Angeles	106–135	Bob Pettit (29)	20–14
35	December 21	@ Los Angeles	105–100	Bob Pettit (35)	21–14
36	December 25	vs. San Francisco	91–94	Bob Pettit (23)	21–15
37	December 26	Los Angeles	104–106	Bob Pettit (39)	22–15
38	December 29	Boston	100–102	Cliff Hagan (25)	23–15
39	December 30	@ Chicago	107–100	Bob Pettit (31)	24–15
40	January 2	@ Syracuse	95–120	Cliff Hagan (33)	24–16
41	January 4	vs. Detroit	121–100	Bob Pettit (22)	25–16
42	January 5	@ Detroit	90–92	Bob Pettit (27)	25–17
43	January 6	San Francisco	103–114	Cliff Hagan (34)	26–17
44	January 8	Los Angeles	99–96	Bob Pettit (23)	26–18
45	January 9	vs. New York	110–95	Bob Pettit (29)	27–18
46	January 12	Cincinnati	109–115	Bob Pettit (36)	28–18
47	January 13	@ Cincinnati	105–104	Chico Vaughn (28)	29–18
48	January 19	San Francisco	114–116	Beaty, Hagan (21)	30–18
49	January 20	San Francisco	115–116	Bob Pettit (37)	31–18
50	January 22	vs. Syracuse	93–113	Bob Pettit (28)	32–18
51	January 24	vs. Boston	109–111	Bob Pettit (40)	32–19
52	January 25	@ Boston	98–113	Bob Pettit (27)	32–20
53	January 27	Los Angeles	105–101	Bob Pettit (34)	32–21
54	January 29	Syracuse	105–123	Bob Pettit (26)	33–21
55	January 31	@ Syracuse	100–112	Bob Pettit (32)	33–22
56	February 1	@ Chicago	119–111	Bob Pettit (35)	34–22
57	February 2	Los Angeles	103–97	Bob Pettit (37)	34–23
58	February 5	vs. Detroit	120–105	Bob Pettit (27)	35–23
59	February 8	Cincinnati	116–112	Bob Pettit (30)	35–24
60	February 10	Detroit	102–95	Bob Pettit (36)	35–25
61	February 12	Syracuse	100–128	Cliff Hagan (34)	36–25
62	February 13	@ New York	103–102	Bob Pettit (25)	37–25
63	February 14	vs. New York	113–123	Bob Pettit (37)	37–26
64	February 15	@ Cincinnati	99–96	Bob Pettit (30)	38–26
65	February 16	Boston	114–94	Bob Pettit (37)	38–27
66	February 22	Chicago	98–115	Bob Pettit (29)	39–27
67	February 24	San Francisco	106–127	Bob Pettit (30)	40–27
68	February 26	Cincinnati	107–114	Bob Pettit (35)	41–27
69	February 27	@ Chicago	93–98	Zelmo Beaty (25)	41–28
70	March 1	vs. Detroit	113–115	Bob Pettit (40)	41–29
71	March 3	Chicago	97–104	Bob Pettit (26)	42–29
72	March 5	@ Chicago	93–116	Lenny Wilkens (19)	42–30
73	March 8	@ New York	129–124	Bob Pettit (40)	43–30
74	March 9	Los Angeles	101–117	Bob Pettit (33)	44–30
75	March 10	New York	120–132	Cliff Hagan (33)	45–30
76	March 11	@ Los Angeles	96–109	Bob Pettit (19)	45–31
77	March 13	@ Los Angeles	112–98	Bob Pettit (35)	46–31
78	March 14	@ San Francisco	114–109	Bob Pettit (35)	47–31
79	March 15	vs. San Francisco	108–119	Bob Pettit (30)	47–32
80	March 17	Detroit	105–119	Bob Pettit (28)	48–32

== Playoffs ==
1963 playoff game log
Division Semifinals: 3–1 (home: 2–0; road: 1–1)

Game	Date	Team	Score	High points	High rebounds	High assists	Location Attendance	Series
1	March 20	Detroit	W 118–99	Pettit, Hagan (31)	Bob Pettit (15)	Wilkens, Barnhill (6)	Kiel Auditorium; 5,818	1–0
2	March 22	Detroit	W 122–108	Bob Pettit (42)	Bob Pettit (18)	Pettit, Farmer (5)	Kiel Auditorium	2–0
3	March 24	@ Detroit	L 103–107	Bob Pettit (36)	Bob Pettit (22)	Lenny Wilkens (10)	Cobo Arena; 3,232	2–1
4	March 26	@ Detroit	W 104–100	Bob Pettit (35)	Bill Bridges (15)	Chico Vaughn (9)	Cobo Arena; 3,257	3–1

Division Finals: 3–4 (home: 3–0; road: 0–4)

Game	Date	Team	Score	High points	High rebounds	High assists	Location Attendance	Series
1	March 31	@ Los Angeles	L 104–112	Bob Pettit (38)	Bob Pettit (14)	Pettit, Barnhill (6)	Los Angeles Memorial Sports Arena; 10,086	0–1
2	April 2	@ Los Angeles	L 99–101	Cliff Hagan (34)	Bob Pettit (16)	Lenny Wilkens (7)	Los Angeles Memorial Sports Arena; 11,225	0–2
3	April 4	Los Angeles	W 125–112	Bob Pettit (33)	Zelmo Beaty (15)	Lenny Wilkens (10)	Kiel Auditorium; 7,396	1–2
4	April 6	Los Angeles	W 124–114	Cliff Hagan (33)	Bob Pettit (15)	Lenny Wilkens (10)	Kiel Auditorium; 10,614	2–2
5	April 7	@ Los Angeles	L 96–123	Chico Vaughn (16)	Mike Farmer (10)	—	Los Angeles Memorial Sports Arena; 15,212	2–3
6	April 9	Los Angeles	W 121–113	Bob Pettit (36)	Bob Pettit (20)	Lenny Wilkens (11)	Kiel Auditorium; 8,110	3–3
7	April 11	@ Los Angeles	L 100–115	Bob Pettit (31)	Bob Pettit (13)	Cliff Hagan (4)	Los Angeles Memorial Sports Arena; 14,864	3–4

1963 schedule

== Awards and records ==
- Harry Gallatin, NBA Coach of the Year Award
- Bob Pettit, All-NBA First Team
- Zelmo Beaty, NBA All-Rookie Team 1st Team
