= 1962–63 NBA season =

17th NBA season

- League: National Basketball Association
- Sport: Basketball
- Duration: October 16, 1962 – March 17, 1963; March 19 – April 21, 1963 (Playoffs); April 14–24, 1963 (Finals)
- Games: 80
- Teams: 9
- TV partner: SNI

Draft
- Top draft pick: Bill McGill
- Picked by: Chicago Zephyrs

Regular season
- Top seed: Boston Celtics
- Season MVP: Bill Russell (Boston)
- Top scorer: Wilt Chamberlain (San Francisco)

Playoffs
- Eastern champions: Boston Celtics
- Eastern runners-up: Cincinnati Royals
- Western champions: Los Angeles Lakers
- Western runners-up: St. Louis Hawks

Finals
- Champions: Boston Celtics
- Runners-up: Los Angeles Lakers

NBA seasons
- ← 1961–62 1963–64 →

The 1962–63 NBA season was the 17th season of the National Basketball Association. The season ended with the Boston Celtics winning their fifth straight NBA championship, beating the Los Angeles Lakers 4 games to 2 in the NBA Finals.

== History ==
- The Warriors move from Philadelphia to San Francisco, California. They play their first seasons in the Cow Palace in Daly City.
- The Chicago Packers are renamed the Chicago Zephyrs.
- The 1963 NBA All-Star Game was played at the Los Angeles Memorial Sports Arena in Los Angeles, California, with the East beating the West 115–108. Bill Russell of the Boston Celtics won the game's MVP award.
- SNI begins televising NBA games, which they would do until the end of the 1963–64 season, when long time NBA broadcast partner ABC would begin televising games. The NBA on SNI only televised two games this season: the All-Star Game and Game 6 of the Finals.
- The NBA starts naming an NBA All-Rookie Team as part of its regular season awards.
- Harry Gallatin of the St. Louis Hawks wins the inaugural NBA Coach of the Year Award.
- NBA Tickets back then cost $3-$5 per game.

== Notable occurrences ==
Coaching changes
Offseason
Team	1961–62 coach	1962–63 coach
Chicago Packers/Zephyrs	Jim Pollard	Jack McMahon
Philadelphia/San Francisco Warriors	Frank McGuire	Bob Feerick
St. Louis Hawks	Bob Pettit	Harry Gallatin
In-season
Team	Outgoing coach	Incoming coach
Chicago Packers/Zephyrs	Jack McMahon	Bobby Leonard

== Season recap ==
=== Off-season ===
In the spring of 1962, Cleveland Pipers owner George Steinbrenner of the new American Basketball League signed Jerry Lucas to a player-management contract worth $40,000. With the Lucas signing, Steinbrenner had a secret deal with NBA commissioner Maurice Podoloff. The Pipers would merge with the Kansas City Steers and join the NBA. A schedule was printed for the 1963–64 NBA season with the Pipers playing the New York Knicks in the first game. But Steinbrenner and partner George McKean fell behind in payments to the NBA and the deal was cancelled.

=== Preseason ===
The season began with a franchise shift, as the Philadelphia Warriors pulled up stakes and headed to San Francisco, joining the Los Angeles Lakers on the West Coast. The Warriors, whose lineage in basketball dates back to the Philadelphia Sphas of the 1920s, had been a fixture for decades in Philadelphia, one of pro basketball's essential cities. Philadelphia would be without an NBA team until the Syracuse Nationals moved there the following season, becoming the Philadelphia 76ers. The Cincinnati Royals were promptly shifted to the more competitive NBA's East Division to replace the Warriors, a fact the Royals would come to regret.

The existence of the rival American Basketball League played a significant factor this year. Globetrotters' owner Abe Saperstein started the league after he was thwarted in a bid for an NBA franchise in Los Angeles. The Minneapolis Lakers had moved to Los Angeles in 1960. The ABL made an immediate splash with two major innovations that the NBA would copy eventually—a wider free throw lane and 3-point field goal for successful shots beyond 25 feet.

=== Leading teams ===
Setting the pace in the Eastern Division, the defending champion Celtics won a league high 58 of 80 NBA games, leading the league in both rebounds and assists as a team, followed by the Lakers in the West with 53. Three other NBA teams won 40 games or better. The Syracuse Nationals and St. Louis Hawks both won 48 games each. The Cincinnati Royals also had 42 wins.

==== Celtics ====
On the court, the powerful Boston Celtics were building a dynasty. Bill Russell led Red Auerbach's club from the middle with his shot blocking and rebounding, where he ranked a huge second place in the NBA. He was also seventh in the NBA in assists, remarkable for a center. Sam Jones had stepped in for Bill Sharman at shooting guard, after Sharman left to coach the ABL Los Angeles Jets. Jones immediately led the club in scoring just as Sharman had, with his deadly banking jump shots. 34-year-old Bob Cousy quarterbacked his club one more time, but the 1950s superstar had clearly lost a step.

==== Lakers ====
Los Angeles Lakers were in their third year in California. The Lakers were led by super forward Elgin Baylor, whose high-flying drives, surprising strength, and all-around game awed many again this season. Baylor averaged 34 points per game rated him second in the NBA, only to Wilt Chamberlain. He was also fifth in rebounds and sixth in assists. No slouch on defense either, Baylor did it all for the Lakers. He was also freed from his military commitments, which limited his availability during the previous season.

Third year star Jerry West battled injuries but continued to grow as a player also. He added 27 points per game and six assists for coach Fred Schaus, also his former college coach. The Lakers won 53 games and the NBA's West Division, looking forward to their matchup with Boston.

==== Nationals ====
The Syracuse Nationals were the league's top offense, a fact they greatly helped at the foul line. Coach Alex Hannum's club were led by the trio of center Johnny Kerr, promising young forward Lee Shaffer and guard Hal Greer. Long-time star Dolph Schayes gave it one more year as a reserve at age 34. This would also be the final season for the NBA in Syracuse. They would relocate to Philadelphia for the following season as the Philadelphia 76ers.

==== Hawks ====
The St. Louis Hawks had five ten-point scorers to support superstar Bob Pettit. The 6'9 230-pounder rated third in NBA scoring with 28.4 points per games and was fifth in rebounds as well. His 685 free throws made led the league. The Hawks also had the NBA's top rated defense.

==== Royals ====
The Cincinnati Royals continued to recover from the tragedy of Maurice Stokes with another huge year from third-year superstar Oscar Robertson. The converted 6' 5 210-pound forward was now rated by many as the best non-center to ever play in the NBA, lighting up the Royals backcourt with 28.3 points, nine rebounds and ten assists per game. Robertson tried 1593 shots this year, the third-highest total, and made 52% of them, the fourth-best percentage for accuracy in the NBA. His 614 free throws made were the second-most also, as he averaged 81% from the foul line. A balanced starting five and some key reserves supported Robertson, as coach Charlie Wolf's team won over half their games for the second straight year. But the Royals continued to struggle with signees. Draft picks Larry Siegfried and Jerry Lucas signed with the Cleveland Pipers of Abe Saperstein's American Basketball League. Worse, Siegfried would return to the NBA as a key Boston Celtic. The loss of these two would hinder the club's playoff chances.

=== Wilt Chamberlain ===
Wilt Chamberlain's first season in San Francisco had his usual incredible stats, but the club failed to win half their games. Wilt's 44 points per game easily ranked him ahead of Baylor in the scoring column. He was also first in the NBA in rebounds, blocked shots, shooting accuracy, number of shots tried and made from the floor, and free throws tried.

=== Postseason ===
Six of the NBA's nine teams made the playoffs, three in each division. The second and third place teams met first, with each division winner meeting the winner in the second round before the NBA Finals.

==== East ====
Boston got a huge scare from the Cincinnati Royals, who shocked Syracuse with an overtime win in Syracuse to win Game Five and that series. Cincinnati ownership was shocked too. They had booked Cincinnati Gardens for a circus, expecting a Royals loss in that series. The Royals had to play two of their home games against Boston elsewhere while pushing Boston the full seven games. Robertson's huge play was boosted further by all-star Jack Twyman' shooting. But Boston's three 20-point scorers --- Tommy Heinsohn, Russell and Jones --- staved off the Royals charge. It was the beginning of a strong, underrated rivalry. Syracuse was hindered by the absence of Connie Dierking, who also had gone to the ABL, but refused to return to the club when that league folded.

==== West ====
In the West, St. Louis topped Don Ohl, Bailey Howell, Ray Scott and the Detroit Pistons three games to one to meet the Lakers in the second round. Detroit's rookie Dave DeBusschere had a strong series off the bench as well in the losing effort. The Lakers and Hawks went the full seven games as well, with Baylor and Pettit trading big offensive games and rebounds. The difference were Laker guards West and Dick Barnett, the former ABL star.

==== Finals ====
The balance and depth of Boston would be too much for Baylor and West in the Finals despite their best efforts. The series went six games, with Boston winning the final one 112–109 in Los Angeles. Boston's Bill Russell, who averaged over 20 points, 20 rebounds, five assists and several blocks per game for his 13 playoff games, was the difference again in the middle for his star-studded team.

== Final standings ==
=== Eastern Division ===
Eastern Division	W	L	PCT	GB	Home	Road	Neutral	Div
x-Boston Celtics	58	22	.725	–	25–5	21–16	12–1	25–11
x-Syracuse Nationals	48	32	.600	10	23–5	13–19	12–8	21–15
x-Cincinnati Royals	42	38	.525	16	23–10	15–19	4–9	20–16
New York Knicks	21	59	.263	37	12–22	5–28	4–9	6–30

=== Western Division ===
Western Division	W	L	PCT	GB	Home	Road	Neutral	Div
x-Los Angeles Lakers	53	27	.663	–	27–7	20–17	6–3	33–13
x-St. Louis Hawks	48	32	.600	5	30–7	13–18	5–7	29–17
x-Detroit Pistons	34	46	.425	19	14–16	8–19	12–11	19–27
San Francisco Warriors	31	49	.388	22	13–20	11–25	7–4	18–28
Chicago Zephyrs	25	55	.313	28	17–17	3–23	5–15	13–27

x – clinched playoff spot

== Playoff bracket ==
Division Semifinals
E3	Cincinnati	3
E2	Syracuse	2
W3	Detroit	1
W2	St. Louis	3

Division Finals
Eastern Division
E1	Boston*	4
E3	Cincinnati	3
Western Division
W1	Los Angeles*	4
W2	St. Louis	3

NBA Finals
E1	Boston*	4
W1	Los Angeles*	2

- * Division winner
- Bold Series winner
- Italic Team with home-court advantage in NBA Finals

== Statistics leaders ==
Category	Player	Team	Stat
Points	Wilt Chamberlain	San Francisco Warriors	3,586
Rebounds	Wilt Chamberlain	San Francisco Warriors	1,946
Assists	Guy Rodgers	San Francisco Warriors	825
FG%	Wilt Chamberlain	San Francisco Warriors	.528
FT%	Larry Costello	Syracuse Nationals	.881

Note: Prior to the 1969–70 season, league leaders in points, rebounds, and assists were determined by totals rather than averages.

== NBA awards ==
- Most Valuable Player: Bill Russell, Boston Celtics
- Rookie of the Year: Terry Dischinger, Chicago Zephyrs
- Coach of the Year: Harry Gallatin, St. Louis Hawks
- All-NBA First Team:
  - F – Bob Pettit, St. Louis Hawks
  - F – Elgin Baylor, Los Angeles Lakers
  - C – Bill Russell, Boston Celtics
  - G – Oscar Robertson, Cincinnati Royals
  - G – Jerry West, Los Angeles Lakers
- All-NBA Second Team:
  - F – Tom Heinsohn, Boston Celtics
  - F – Bailey Howell, Detroit Pistons
  - C – Wilt Chamberlain, San Francisco Warriors
  - G – Bob Cousy, Boston Celtics
  - G – Hal Greer, Syracuse Nationals
- NBA All-Rookie First Team:
  - Zelmo Beaty, St. Louis Hawks
  - Dave DeBusschere, Detroit Pistons
  - Terry Dischinger, Chicago Zephyrs
  - John Havlicek, Boston Celtics
  - Chet Walker, Syracuse Nationals

== See also ==
- List of NBA regular season records
