= Wilt =

Wilt may refer to:

- Wilting, the loss of rigidity of non-woody parts of plants
- Wilt disease, which can refer to a number of different diseases in plants.
- wilt, an archaic verb form, see will and shall

== Literature and film ==
- Wilt (novel), a novel by Tom Sharpe
  - Wilt (film), a 1989 adaptation of Sharpe's novel
- Wilt: Larger than Life, a biography of Wilt Chamberlain by Robert Cherry
- Wilt: Just Like Any Other 7-Foot Black Millionaire Who Lives Next Door, an autobiography by Wilt Chamberlain

== Other media ==
- Wilt (American band), an American alt-rock band
- Wilt (Irish band), an Irish indie rock band formed by ex-members of Kerbdog
- WILT (FM), a radio station (103.7 FM) licensed to serve Wrightsville Beach, North Carolina, United States
- WILT-LD, a low-power television station (channel 33, virtual 24) licensed to serve Wilmington, North Carolina
- WYHW, a radio station (104.5 FM) licensed to serve Wilmington, North Carolina, which held the call sign WILT from 2008 to 2015
- WRMR (FM), a radio station (98.7 FM) licensed to serve Jacksonville, North Carolina, which held the call sign WILT from 2005 to 2008
- "Wilt", a song by Blind Melon from Soup
- Wilt, a fictional character from the animated TV series Foster's Home for Imaginary Friends

== People ==
- Wilt Chamberlain, a Hall of Fame American basketball player, born Wilton Chamberlain
- Wilt (surname), several people with the surname "Wilt"

== See also ==
- Wilton (disambiguation)
- Wilts, an abbreviation for Wiltshire in England
- Wiltz (disambiguation)
