= Wilt (surname) =

Wilt is a surname. Notable people with the surname include:

- Chad Wilt (born 1978), American football player and coach
- Clara Antoinette McCarty Wilt (1858–1929), the first woman superintendent of the Pierce County School District
- Marie Wilt (1833–1891), an Austrian dramatic coloratura soprano
- Peter Wilt, a soccer executive
- Raymond Wilt, a former Republican member of the Pennsylvania House of Representatives
- Rod Wilt, a former Republican member of the Pennsylvania House of Representatives
- Roy Wilt, a former Republican member of the Pennsylvania House of Representatives
- Toby S. Wilt (born c. 1945), American businessman and golfer
- W. William Wilt, a former Republican member of the Pennsylvania House of Representatives
