= Senator Willard =

Senator Willard may refer to:

- James E. Willard (1903–1988), Pennsylvania State Senate
- John D. Willard (1799–1864), New York State Senate
- John Willard (judge) (1792–1862), New York State Senate
- Joseph A. Willard (1803–1868), New York State Senate
- Kenneth R. Willard (1902–1987), New York State Senate
- Victor Willard (1813–1869), Wisconsin State Senate
- Cynthia Willard-Lewis (born 1952), Louisiana State Senate
