= Robert D. Robbins =

American politician

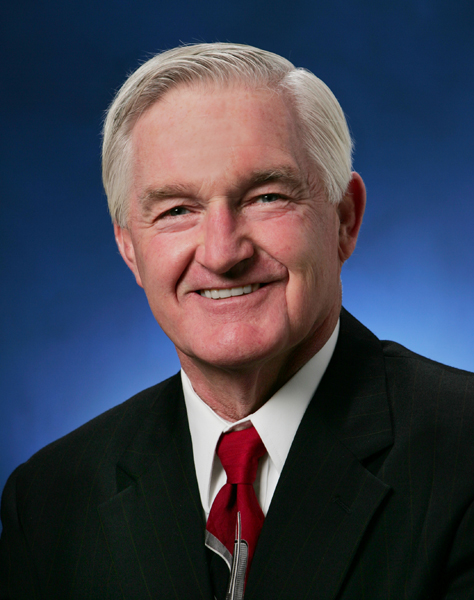

Member of the Pennsylvania Senate from the 50th district
- In office January 1, 1991 – January 1, 2015
- Preceded by: Roy Wilt
- Succeeded by: Michele Brooks
- Constituency: Crawford, Butler, Mercer, and Lawrence Counties

Member of the Pennsylvania House of Representatives from the 17th district
- In office January 4, 1983 – November 21, 1990
- Preceded by: Thomas Murphy
- Succeeded by: David Orr King

Personal details
- Born: August 27, 1944 (age 82) Greenville, Pennsylvania
- Party: Republican
- Spouse: Cynthia A. Robbins
- Education: United States Military Academy at West Point, Geneva College

Military service
- Allegiance: United States
- Branch/service: United States Army
- Years of service: 1966–1971
- Rank: Captain
- Battles/wars: Vietnam War

Robert Dennis "Bob" Robbins (born August 27, 1944) is a former Republican member of the Pennsylvania State Senate, representing the 50th District since 1990. He previously served as a member of the Pennsylvania House of Representatives for the 17th District from 1983 to 1990.

== Education and early career ==
Robbins was born and raised in the northwestern Pennsylvania borough of Greenville. He graduated from Greenville High School in 1962 and subsequently entered the United States Military Academy at West Point with the Class of 1966. After graduation from West Point, Robbins was commissioned as a second lieutenant in the Regular Army and served two tours in Vietnam as a paratrooper, eventually serving as a company commander with D Company, 501st Airborne Infantry Battalion, 2nd Brigade, 101st Airborne Division. He left the Army in 1971 with an honorable discharge at the rank of captain.

With his Army service complete, Robbins earned his teaching certificate from Geneva College in 1973 and then returned to Greenville, where he became a teacher and wrestling coach at Greenville High School. Robbins also worked as an insurance agent for Massachusetts Mutual Life Insurance Company.

== Public service ==
In 1982, Robbins won election as a Republican to a Mercer County-based seat in the Pennsylvania House of Representatives, and subsequently served four terms in the body.

In 1990, Robbins ran for state senate in the 50th Senate District to replace fellow Republican Roy Wilt, who was retiring. Despite the district's conservative character, Robbins faced a strong challenge from businessmen and Meadville city Councilman Charles W. Flynn, who hoped to ride the coattails of popular Governor Bob Casey to victory. However, despite Casey's overwhelming victory over state Auditor General Barbara Hafer, Robbins prevailed, and has faced little serious opposition since.

Robbins rose through the ranks of Senate Republicans to become Majority Caucus Secretary. In 2006, he was one of the only members of the Senate leadership to be re-elected after voter anger at the 2005 legislative pay raise knocked out several members of the leadership, including Senate President Pro Tempore Robert Jubelirer and Senate Majority Leader David J. Brightbill.

Robbins most recently served as vice chairman of the Veterans Affairs & Emergency Preparedness Committee, and also serves as chairman of the bipartisan Local Government Commission, vice chairman of the Athletic Oversight Committee, and a member of the Keystone State Games Commission.
