= Rod Wilt =

American politician

Member of the Pennsylvania House of Representatives from the 17th district
- In office January 7, 1997 – November 30, 2006
- Preceded by: David Orr King
- Succeeded by: Michele Brooks

Personal details
- Born: June 11, 1964 (age 62) Greenville, Pennsylvania
- Party: Republican
- Spouse: Jill
- Education: Thiel College
- Occupation: Real Estate Investor/Consultant

Rod Wilt (born June 11, 1964) is a former Republican member of the Pennsylvania House of Representatives.

== Biography ==
Wilt is a 1982 graduate of Greenville High School. He graduated from Thiel College in 1986, where he was an NCAA Division III Wrestling All-American and an Academic All-American. He was inducted into the Thiel College Athletic Hall of Fame in October 1996. Wilt worked as director of real estate acquisitions for the Hudson Real Estate Group in Hermitage, Pennsylvania and as product manager in sales and marketing for Winner International Corporation in Sharon, Pennsylvania. He has also worked as assistant vice president at First National Bank of Pennsylvania and as vice president of the Mortgage Service Corporation of Hermitage, Pennsylvania.

Wilt was first elected to represent the 17th legislative district in the Pennsylvania House of Representatives in 1996. With his victory, Rod became the third generation of State Representatives in the Wilt Family: his grandfather Ray Wilt represented the 29th legislative district in Allegheny County from 1951 to 1969 and his father Roy Wilt represented the 8th legislative district in Mercer County from 1968 to 1980 and the 50th senatorial district in the Pennsylvania Senate from 1981 to 1990.

Wilt withdrew his name from the ballot in June 2006, a month after winning the 2006 Republican primary election. Wilt explained that he had filed his nomination petitions with "mixed emotions" and "was never fully comfortable with [his] decision" to seek re-election. The Republican party picked Mercer County Commissioner Michele Brooks to take his place on the November ballot.

In June, 2015, Wilt succeeded the late former state Senator William Stewart as state director of the Keystone Energy Forum. The forum seeks to educate opinion leaders, elected officials and the public on the benefits of increasing U.S. domestic energy production; its goal is to insulate the U.S. from the vagaries and pitfalls of the world energy markets by make the country energy self-sufficient through sound national and state energy policies.
