= David Orr King =

American politician (1938–2019)

Member of the Pennsylvania House of Representatives from the 17th district
- In office 1991–1996
- Preceded by: Robert D. Robbins
- Succeeded by: Rod Wilt

Personal details
- Born: February 24, 1938 Mercer, Pennsylvania, U.S.
- Died: June 10, 2019 (aged 81) Lady Lake, Florida, U.S.
- Party: Republican
- Spouse: Judy King
- Children: three
- Education: University of Pittsburgh

David Orr King (February 24, 1938 – June 10, 2019) was a Republican member of the Pennsylvania House of Representatives.
