= Michele Brooks =

American politician

Member of the Pennsylvania Senate from the 50th district
- Incumbent
- Assumed office January 6, 2015
- Preceded by: Robert D. Robbins

Member of the Pennsylvania House of Representatives from the 17th district
- In office January 2, 2007 – January 6, 2015
- Preceded by: Rod E. Wilt
- Succeeded by: Parke Wentling

Personal details
- Party: Republican
- Spouse: Guy Brooks
- Children: 2
- Website: Senate Website

Michele Brooks is a Republican member of the Pennsylvania State Senate for the 50th District. Prior to her election to the State Senate in 2014, she served as a member of Pennsylvania House of Representatives for the 17th District and was elected in 2006.

== Personal ==
Brooks graduated from the Anne Anstine Excellence in Public Services Series. Her professional experience includes being the co-founder and vice president of the Jamestown Future Foundation.

== Public service career ==
In June 2006, Brooks was selected by the local Republican committee to replace the retiring, ten-year incumbent Rod Wilt on the ballot. Prior to her election, she served as a member of the Mercer County Commissioners. She also was a member of the Jamestown Borough Council from 1996 through 2002.

Brooks has served as the State Senator for the 50th district since 2015.

For the 2025-2026 Session Brooks serves on the following committees in the State Senate:

- Health & Human Services (Chair)
- Agriculture & Rural Affairs (Vice Chair)
- Consumer Protection & Professional Licensure
- Institutional Sustainability & Innovation
- Rules & Executive Nominations
- Veterans Affairs & Emergency Preparedness
