= Wilt: Larger than Life =

2004 book by Robert Cherry

Cover of the book

Wilt: Larger Than Life (ISBN 1572439157) is a biography of NBA professional basketball player Wilt Chamberlain by journalist Robert Cherry. The 416-page book was published in November 2004 by Triumph Books. The foreword is written by Jerry West, Chamberlain's teammate and friend on the Los Angeles Lakers.

The book spans Wilt Chamberlains' life, starting with his roots in Philadelphia, highlights his rise to young basketball prodigy in Overbrook High School and at Kansas University, follows his NBA career as member of the Philadelphia / San Francisco Warriors, Philadelphia 76ers and Lakers franchises and his successful business life afterwards and up to his death. Cherry also delves into the more colorful aspects of Chamberlain's private life, most prominently his notorious claim to have slept with 20,000 women.

In the final "Acknowledgements" chapter, Cherry cites over 150 interviews, and singles out Chamberlain's lawyer Sy Goldberg, his sister Barbara Lewis (née Chamberlain) his long-time physician Dr Stan Lorber, and close personal friends Lynda Huey, Zelda Spoelstra, Bob Billings as main sources.

== Reception ==
Booklist has been appreciative of the book. It calls it "a solid biography for any sports collection", "addresses the misconception [that Chamberlain was perennially called a loser]", and "also gives enough, but not too much, attention to Chamberlain's ill-considered, though possibly accurate, boast that he'd slept with some 20,000 women."
