= Wiltz (disambiguation) =

Wiltz may refer to:

Geography

- Wiltz, a town and commune in north-western Luxembourg
- Wiltz (canton), a canton of Luxembourg named after the town
- Wiltz (river), a river in Belgium and Luxembourg that flows through the town

People

- Jason Wiltz (born 1976), American football player
- Louis A. Wiltz, (1843-1881), Louisiana politician
- Wendy Wiltz, American model from Louisiana

Other

- FC Wiltz 71, a football club in the town of Wiltz
