= Pennsylvania's 50th Senate district =

American legislative district

Pennsylvania's 9th State Senate district
Senator
Michele Brooks; R–Jamestown
- Population (2021): 263,540

Pennsylvania State Senate District 50 includes part of Lawrence County and all of Crawford County and Mercer County. It is currently represented by Republican Michele Brooks.

== District profile ==
The district includes the following areas:

All of Crawford County

Lawrence County:

- Bessemer
- Hickory Township
- Mahoning Township
- Neshannock Township
- New Castle
- New Wilmington
- North Beaver Township
- Plain Grove Township
- Pulaski Township
- Scott Township
- Shenango Township
- Slippery Rock Township
- S.N.P.J.
- South New Castle
- Taylor Township
- Union Township
- Volant
- Washington Township
- Wilmington Township

All of Mercer County

== Senators ==
Representative	Party	Years	District home	Note	Counties
Rowland B. Mahany	Republican	1947–1958			Crawford, Mercer
Raymond P. Shafer	Republican	1959–1962			Crawford, Mercer
Rowland B. Mahany	Republican	1963 – 1968			Crawford, Mercer, Erie (part)
James E. Willard	Republican	1969–1970			Crawford, Mercer, Erie (part)
R. Budd Dwyer	Republican	1971–1972		Resigned January 20, 1981 to become Treasurer of Pennsylvania	Crawford, Mercer, Erie (part)
R. Budd Dwyer	Republican	1973–1981		Resigned January 20, 1981 to become Treasurer of Pennsylvania	Mercer, Crawford (part), Erie (part)
Roy W. Wilt	Republican	1981–1982		Seated April 21, 1981	Mercer, Crawford (part), Erie (part)
Roy W. Wilt	Republican	1983–1990		Seated April 21, 1981	Crawford, Mercer, Venango (part)
Robert D. Robbins	Republican	1991– 1992			Crawford, Mercer, Venango (part)
Robert D. Robbins	Republican	1993–2003			Crawford, Mercer, Erie (part)
Robert D. Robbins	Republican	2004–2012			Crawford, Mercer, Butler (part), Lawrence (part)
Robert D. Robbins	Republican	2013–2014			Crawford, Mercer, Erie (part), Warren (part)
Michele Brooks	Republican	2015–present			Crawford, Mercer, Erie (part), Warren (part)
