= James E. Willard =

American politician (1903–1988)

Member of the Pennsylvania Senate from the 50th district
- In office January 7, 1969 – November 30, 1970
- Preceded by: Rowland Mahany
- Succeeded by: R. Budd Dwyer
- Constituency: Parts of Crawford, Mercer, and Erie Counties

Member of the Pennsylvania House of Representatives from the Mercer County district
- In office January 1, 1957 – November 30, 1966

Personal details
- Born: November 20, 1903 Vandergrift, Pennsylvania, U.S.
- Died: April 27, 1988 (aged 84) Pulaski, Pennsylvania, U.S.
- Party: Republican
- Occupation: Politician

James E. Willard (November 20, 1903 – April 27, 1988) was an American politician. He was a Republican member of the Pennsylvania State Senate, serving from 1969 to 1970. He also served in the Pennsylvania House of Representatives.
