= Wilt Chamberlain =

American basketball player (1936–1999)

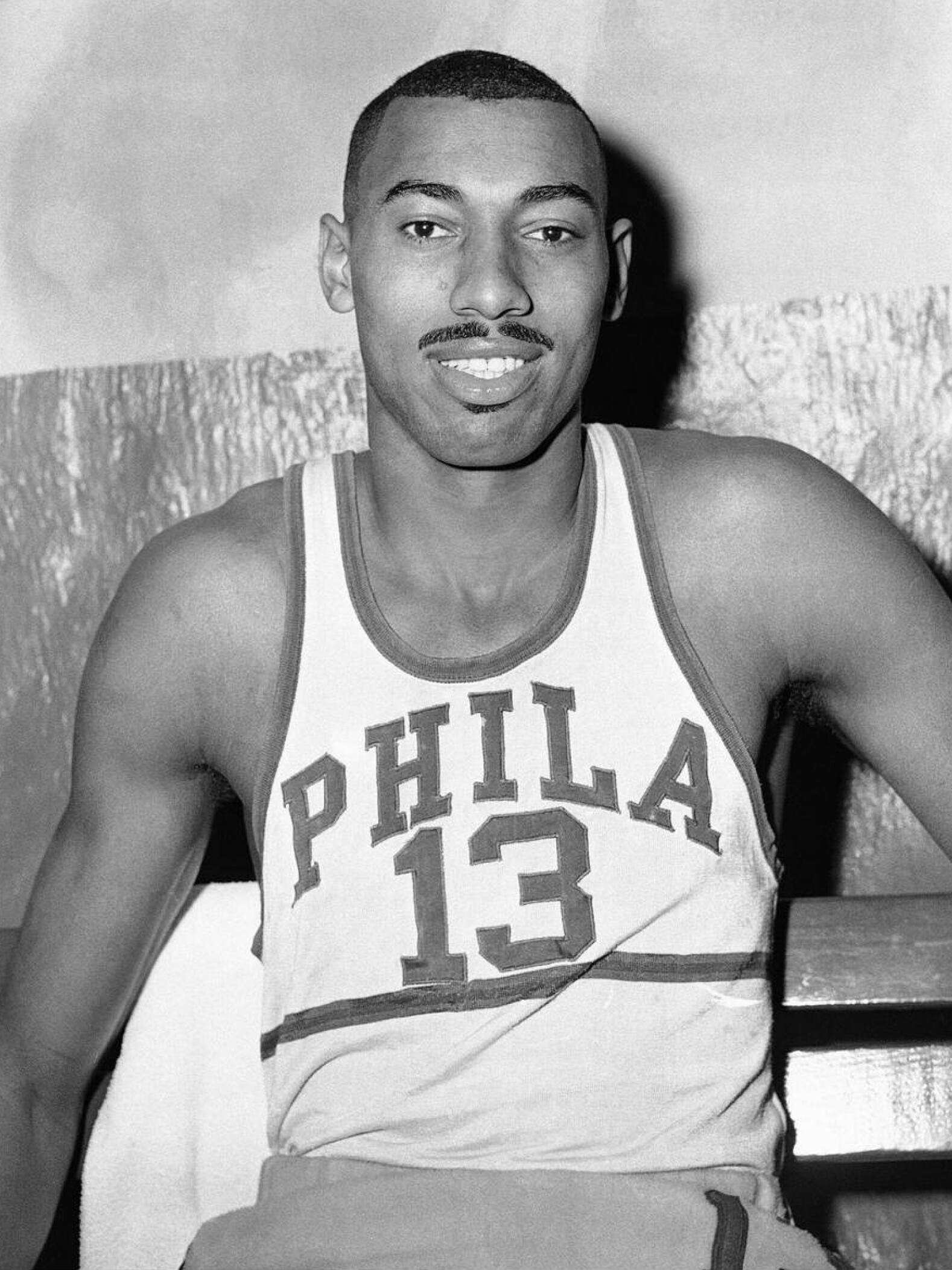
- Chamberlain with the Philadelphia Warriors in 1960

Personal information
- Born: August 21, 1936 Philadelphia, Pennsylvania, U.S.
- Died: October 12, 1999 (aged 63) Los Angeles, California, U.S.
- Listed height: 7 ft 1 in (2.16 m)
- Listed weight: 250 lb (113 kg)

Career information
- High school: Overbrook (Philadelphia, Pennsylvania)
- College: Kansas (1956–1958)
- NBA draft: 1959: territorial pick
- Drafted by: Philadelphia Warriors
- Playing career: 1952–1973
- Position: Center
- Number: 13
- Coaching career: 1973–1974

Career history

Playing
- 1952: Pittsburgh Raiders
- 1955–1956: Quakertown Fays
- 1958–1959: Harlem Globetrotters
- 1959–1965: Philadelphia / San Francisco Warriors
- 1965–1968: Philadelphia 76ers
- 1968–1973: Los Angeles Lakers

Coaching
- 1973–1974: San Diego Conquistadors

Career highlights
- 2× NBA champion (1967, 1972); NBA Finals MVP (1972); 4× NBA Most Valuable Player (1960, 1966–1968); 13× NBA All-Star (1960–1969, 1971–1973); NBA All-Star Game MVP (1960); 7× All-NBA First Team (1960–1962, 1964, 1966–1968); 3× All-NBA Second Team (1963, 1965, 1972); 2× NBA All-Defensive First Team (1972, 1973); NBA Rookie of the Year (1960); 7× NBA scoring champion (1960–1966); 11× NBA rebounding champion (1960–1963, 1966–1969, 1971–1973); NBA assist leader (1968); NBA anniversary team (35th, 50th, 75th); No. 13 retired by Harlem Globetrotters; No. 13 retired by Golden State Warriors; No. 13 retired by Philadelphia 76ers; No. 13 retired by Los Angeles Lakers; NCAA Tournament Most Outstanding Player (1957); 2× Consensus first-team All-American (1957, 1958); 2× First-team All-Big 8 (1957, 1958); No. 13 retired by Kansas Jayhawks; Mr. Basketball USA (1955)

Career statistics
- Points: 31,419 (30.1 ppg)
- Rebounds: 23,924 (22.9 rpg)
- Assists: 4,643 (4.4 apg)
- Stats at NBA.com
- Stats at Basketball Reference
- Basketball Hall of Fame
- Collegiate Basketball Hall of Fame

Wilton Norman Chamberlain (/ˈtʃeɪmbərlɪn/ CHAYM-bər-lin; August 21, 1936 – October 12, 1999) was an American professional basketball player. Standing 7 feet 1 inch (2.16 m) tall, he played center in the National Basketball Association (NBA) for 14 seasons. He was enshrined in the Naismith Memorial Basketball Hall of Fame in 1978, and was elected to the NBA's 35th, 50th, and 75th anniversary teams. Chamberlain is widely considered to be one of the greatest basketball players of all time.

According to former teammate Billy Cunningham, "The NBA Guide reads like Wilt's personal diary." Chamberlain holds 72 NBA records, including several regular season records in scoring, rebounding, and durability; blocks were not counted during his career. He remains the only player to score 100 points in a single game. He also once gathered 55 rebounds, and never fouled out. Chamberlain is the only player to average 30 points and 20 rebounds per game in a season, a feat he accomplished seven times. He once averaged 50 points per game, as well as 48 minutes per game, in a season. Chamberlain ultimately won two NBA championships, four regular-season Most Valuable Player (MVP) awards, the Rookie of the Year, one Finals MVP, and one All-Star Game MVP; he was selected to thirteen All-Star Games and ten All-NBA Teams (seven First and three Second teams). He won seven scoring, eleven rebounding, nine durability, and nine field goal percentage titles.

While in college, Chamberlain played for the Kansas Jayhawks, and lost the national championship game to the North Carolina Tar Heels in triple overtime his sophomore year. He also played for the Harlem Globetrotters before joining the NBA, where he played for the Philadelphia / San Francisco Warriors, Philadelphia 76ers, and Los Angeles Lakers. Chamberlain had an on-court rivalry with Boston Celtics' center Bill Russell, suffering a long string of losses before breaking through and winning the 1967 NBA Finals as a member of the 76ers. Chamberlain won his second championship as a member of the 1972 Lakers, a team which set a record with a 33-game winning streak. Following his professional basketball career, Chamberlain played volleyball in the short-lived International Volleyball Association (IVA). He served one term as league president and is enshrined in both the IVA and beach volleyball Hall of Fames.

Sportswriters had known Chamberlain by several nicknames during his playing career, calling attention to his height since his high school days. He disliked the ones that negatively portrayed his height, such as "Wilt the Stilt" and "Goliath", preferring "the Big Dipper", inspired by his friends who saw him dip his head as he walked through doorways. The name was retained in one of Chamberlain's signature moves, the "dipper dunk". He was one of the first players to make prominent use of shots like the fade away jump shot, and the finger roll. His success near the basket led to the widening of the lane, offensive goaltending rules, and the banning of inbound passes over the backboard. Chamberlain, who was always a poor free throw shooter, had the ability to dunk from the foul line, which led to the ruling that a free-throw shooter must keep his feet behind the line.

== Early years ==
Wilton Norman Chamberlain was born on August 21, 1936, in Philadelphia, Pennsylvania, the sixth of nine children to southerners Olivia Ruth (née Johnson), a domestic worker, and William Chamberlain, a welder and handyman. The family lived in a middle-class neighborhood in the Haddington section of West Philadelphia. Chamberlain was raised as a Baptist.

Chamberlain's first competitive sport was track. As a fourth grader, he ran the 300-yard shuttle in the 1946 Penn Relays among older teammates. Tall from an early age, he stood 6 ft 0 in (1.83 m) by 10 years old. He nearly died of pneumonia in his early years and missed a whole year of school as a result. During early childhood, he was not interested in basketball, which he regarded as "a game for sissies". According to Chamberlain, however, "basketball was king in Philadelphia", so he eventually turned to the sport in seventh grade, while attending Shoemaker Junior High School.

== High school career ==
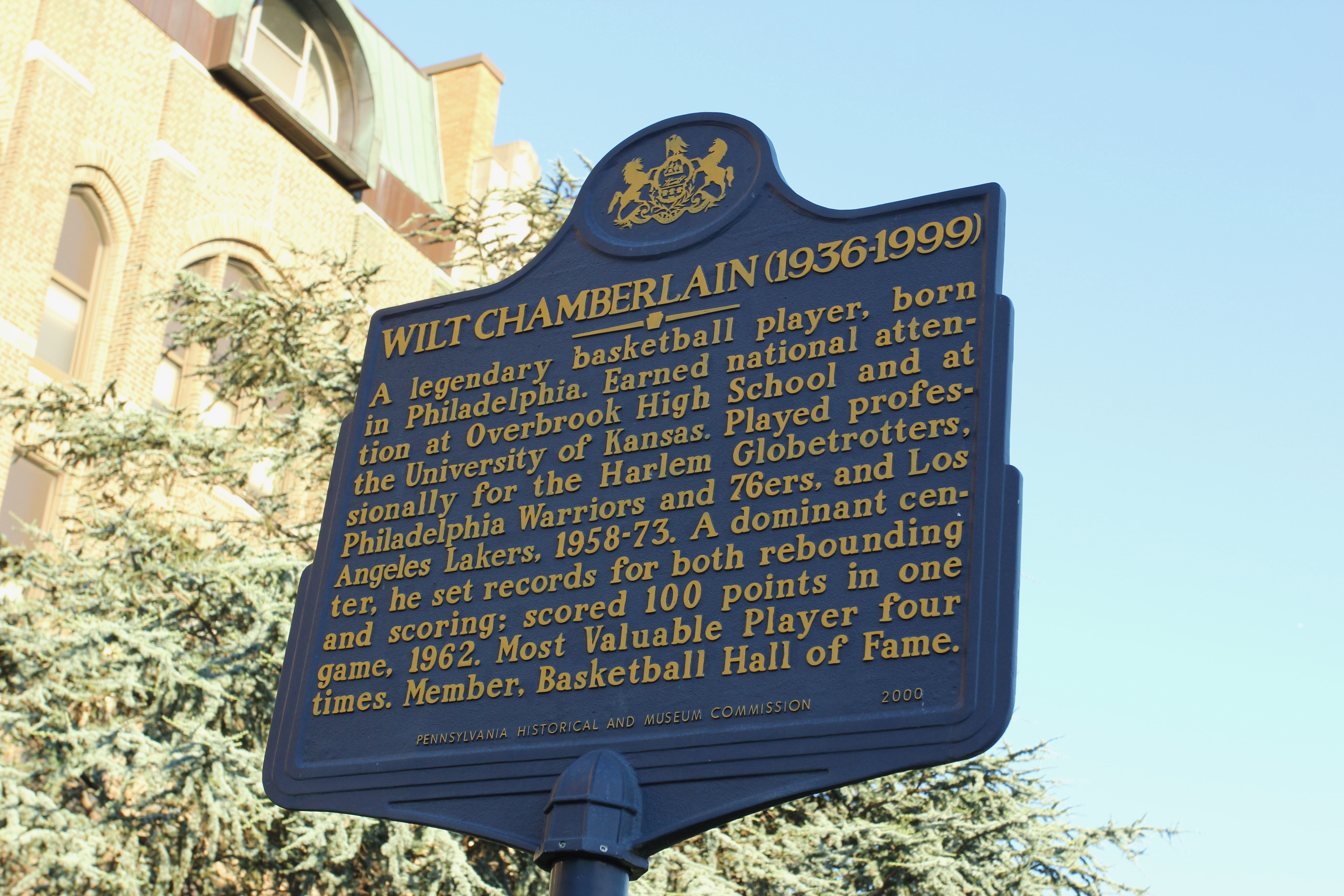
Chamberlain historical marker outside of Philadelphia's Overbrook High School

=== Overbrook High School (1953–1955) ===
Chamberlain stood 6 ft 11 in (2.11 m) when he entered Philadelphia's Overbrook High School. As an avid track and field athlete, he high jumped 6 feet, 6 inches, ran the 440 yards in 49.0 seconds and the 880 yards in 1:58.3, put the shot 53 feet, 4 inches, and long jumped 22 feet.

Chamberlain was the star player for the Overbrook Hilltoppers basketball team, wearing jersey number five. (Note: Overbrook had previously produced star basketball players like Jackie Moore and Hal Lear.) Chamberlain had a natural advantage against his peers; he became renowned for his scoring talent, physical strength, and shot-blocking abilities. According to ESPN journalist Hal Bock, Chamberlain was "scary, flat-out frightening ... before he came along, very few players at the center position possessed his level of athleticism, stature, and stamina. Chamberlain changed the game in fundamental ways no other player did." In this period of his life, his three lifelong nicknames "Wilt the Stilt", "Goliath", and "The Big Dipper"—his favorite—were coined.

Chamberlain led the team to two city championships over three seasons, with Overbrook logging a 56–3 win-loss record. He broke Hall of Fame guard Tom Gola's Philadelphia-high-school scoring record (2,222 points) and graduated with 2,252 points, averaging 37.4 points per game.

==== 1953: city runner-up ====
Chamberlain averaged 31 points per game during his 1953 high-school season and led his team to a 71–62 win over the Northeast High School team of Hall of Fame guard Guy Rodgers. Chamberlain scored 34 points as Overbrook won the Philadelphia Public League title and gained a spot in the city championship game against West Catholic High School, the winner of the rival Catholic league. In that game, West Catholic quadruple-teamed Chamberlain throughout the game, and despite his 29 points, the Hilltoppers lost 54–42.

==== 1954: city champions ====
In his second season, Chamberlain led Overbrook to a 19–0 season. He scored a high-school record 71 points against Roxborough. The Hilltoppers comfortably won the Public League title after again beating Northeast High, as Chamberlain scored 40 points. Overbrook then won the city title by defeating South Catholic 74–50. Chamberlain scored 32 points and Overbrook finished the season undefeated.

During his summer vacations, Chamberlain worked as a bellhop at Kutsher's Hotel. (Note: Chamberlain could lift luggage to the second floor window without needing to use the stairs.) Owners Milton and Helen Kutsher maintained a lifelong friendship with Chamberlain. (Note: They were "his second set of parents" according to their son Mark.) Red Auerbach, the coach of the NBA's Boston Celtics, was also athletic director of the summer basketball league at Kutscher's; Auerbach spotted Chamberlain playing there and had him play one-on-one against University of Kansas (KU) standout and national champion B. H. Born, elected NCAA Most Outstanding Player in 1953. Chamberlain won 25–10; Born was so dejected he gave up a promising NBA career and became a tractor engineer; according to Born, "If there were high school kids that good, I figured I wasn't going to make it to the pros". Auerbach wanted Chamberlain to go to a New England university so the Celtics could draft him as a territorial pick but Chamberlain did not respond.

==== 1955: city champions ====
In Chamberlain's third and final Overbrook season, he continued his high scoring, logging 74, 78, and 90 points in three consecutive games. The Hilltoppers suffered just one loss, to Farrell High 59–58. Overbrook won the Public League a third time, beating West Philadelphia 78–60; in the city championship game, they again played West Catholic. Chamberlain scored 35 points and led Overbrook to an 83–42 victory. He was retroactively honored as Mr. Basketball USA for 1955, the earliest year for which such a selection was made.

=== Christian Street YMCA ===
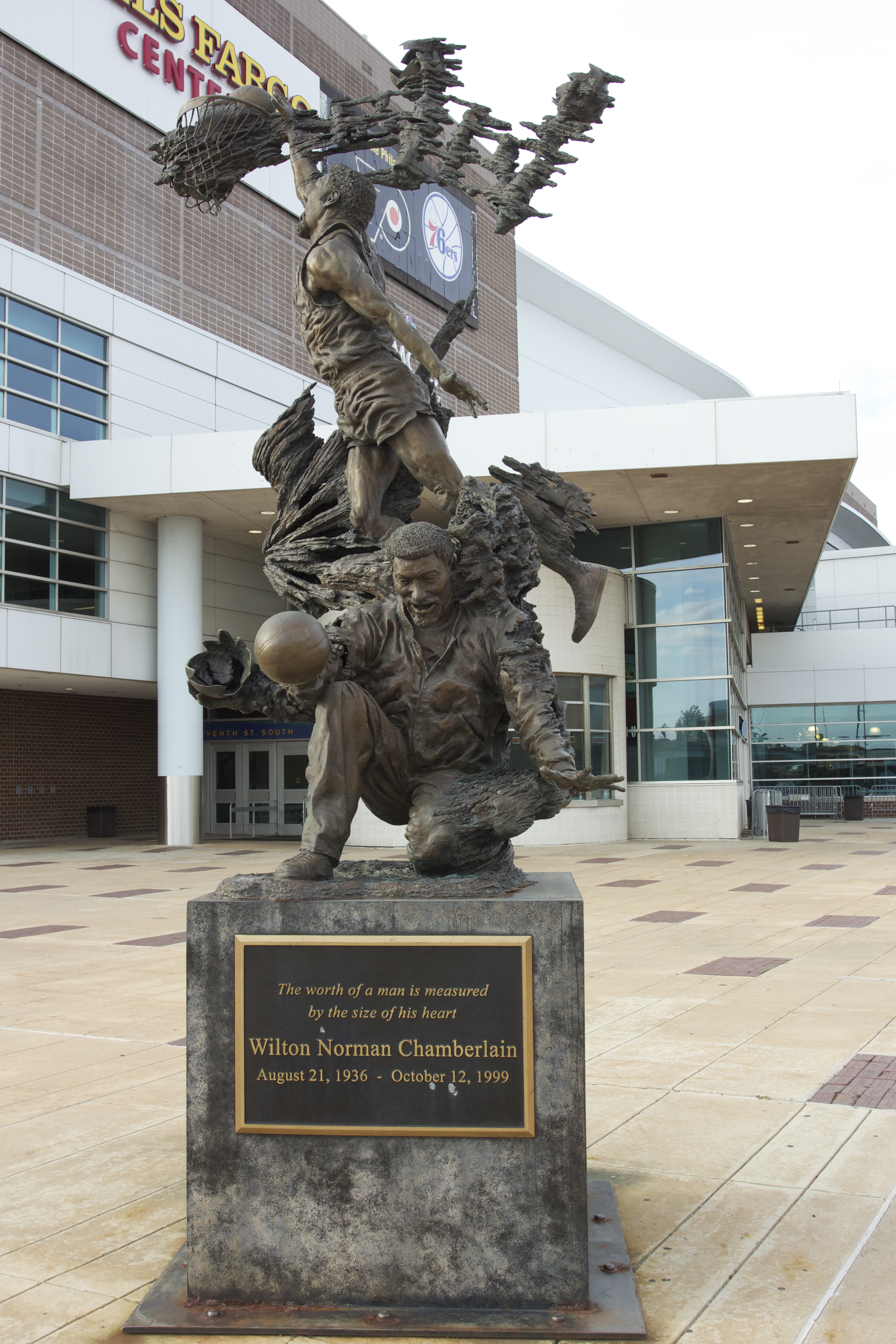
Chamberlain statue in South Philadelphia

In 1953, while still a sophomore in high school, Chamberlain won his first championship. He led Christian Street YMCA to the title in the national YMCA tournament in High Point, North Carolina, beating the local favorite and defending champion High Point team 85–79. Chamberlain was the youngest member of the team.

=== Pittsburgh Raiders and Quakertown Fays ===
On December 21, 1952, Chamberlain played for the Pittsburgh Raiders under the pseudonym of George Marcus in a professional game against the Cumberland Old Germans. At the ages of 16 and 17, Chamberlain, using the same pseudonym, played several games for the semi-professional team Quakertown Fays of Quakertown, Pennsylvania, during the 1954–55 season. The games were reported in local publications, but Chamberlain tried to keep them secret from the Amateur Athletic Union because they jeopardised his eligibility to play amateur basketball.

== College career ==
After his last Overbrook season, more than 200 universities tried to recruit Chamberlain. Among others, UCLA offered Chamberlain the opportunity to become a movie star, the University of Pennsylvania wanted to buy him diamonds, and Cecil Mosenson, Chamberlain's coach at Overbrook, was offered a coaching position if he could persuade Chamberlain to accept an offer.

Chamberlain wished to experience life away from home, so he eliminated colleges from the East Coast; he also ruled out the South because of racial segregation and felt West Coast basketball was of a lower quality than in other regions. This left the Midwest as Chamberlain's probable choice. After visiting KU and talking with the school's coach, Phog Allen, Chamberlain announced he was going to play college basketball at Kansas.

=== University of Kansas (1956–1958) ===
In 1955, Chamberlain entered the University of Kansas (KU); he was a member of Kappa Alpha Psi fraternity and was president of his pledge class. As he had at Overbrook, Chamberlain displayed his diverse athletic talent at KU. He ran the 100-yard dash in 10.9 seconds, shot-putted fifty-six feet (17 m), triple jumped more than fifty feet (15 m), and won the high jump in the Big Eight Conference track-and-field championships in three consecutive years. (Note: In the days before the Fosbury Flop, the straddle technique was preferred in the high jump. Chamberlain liked to wear a red and black plaid cap during his college track events.) Chamberlain allegedly dunked on an experimental 12-foot basket set up by Phog Allen.

Chamberlain's freshman team debut was highly anticipated; the freshman team played against the varsity, who were favored to win their conference that year. Chamberlain dominated his older college teammates by scoring 42 points (16–35 from the field, 10–12 on free throws), grabbing 29 rebounds, and registering 4 blocks.

Chamberlain was the catalyst for several 1956 NCAA basketball rule changes, including the requirement for a shooter to keep both feet behind the line during a free-throw attempt. (Note: Until the ball touches the rim, backboard or the free throw ends.) He had a 50-inch (130 cm) vertical leap, and was capable of converting foul shots by dunking without a running start, beginning his movement just steps behind the top of the key. (Note: Tex Winter, coach at rival Kansas State, was a member of the rules committee who watched Chamberlain dunk from the foul line during scrimmages at Hoch Auditorium.) An inbounds pass over the backboard was banned because of Chamberlain. Offensive goaltending, also called basket interference, was introduced as a rule in 1956 after Bill Russell had exploited it at San Francisco and Chamberlain was soon to enter college play.

Chamberlain's prospects of playing under coach Allen ended when Allen turned 70 and retired shortly after in accordance with KU regulations. According to biographer Robert Cherry, it is doubtful Chamberlain would have chosen KU if he had known Allen was going to retire. Chamberlain had a poor relationship with Allen's successor, Dick Harp. For many years following Chamberlain's departure from KU, critics said he wanted to leave the Midwest or was embarrassed by not being able to win a championship. In 1998, Chamberlain returned to Allen Fieldhouse in Lawrence, Kansas, to participate in a jersey-retiring ceremony for his No. 13 jersey. He said, "There's been a lot of conversation ... that I have some dislike for the University of Kansas. That is totally ridiculous."

==== Sophomore season (1957): national runner-up to North Carolina ====
On December 3, 1956, Chamberlain made his varsity basketball debut as a center for the Kansas Jayhawks. In his first game, he scored 52 points and grabbed 31 rebounds, breaking both all-time Kansas records in an 87–69 win against the Northwestern Wildcats, a team with Chamberlain's future NBA teammate Joe Ruklick playing center. Chamberlain led a talented squad of starters, including Maurice King, Gene Elstun, John Parker, and Ron Loneski; the Jayhawks went 13–1 until they lost a game 56–54 against the Oklahoma State Cowboys, who held the ball for the last three-and-a -half minutes with no intention of scoring a basket, which was still possible in the days before the shot clock, introduced by the NCAA in 1984.

Kansas finished the regular season 21–2 and were Big Seven conference champions. Chamberlain was named first-team All-American. Teammate Monte Johnson stated Chamberlain had "unbelievable endurance and speed ... and was never tired. When he dunked, he was so fast that a lot of players got their fingers jammed [between Chamberlain's hand and the rim]." By this time, several aspects of Chamberlain's game, such as his finger roll, his fadeaway jump shot—which he could also make as a bank shot—his passing, and his shot-blocking, were already developed.

The Jayhawks were one of twenty-three teams selected to play in the 1957 NCAA basketball tournament. The Midwest Regional was held in Dallas, Texas, which at the time was segregated. In the first game, the Jayhawks played the all-white SMU Mustangs, and KU's John Parker later said: "The crowd was brutal. We were spat on, pelted with debris, and subjected to the vilest racial epithets possible." KU won 73–65 in overtime, and police had to escort the Jayhawks out. The next game against Oklahoma City was equally unpleasant, with KU winning 81–61.

In the semifinals, the Jayhawks defeated the two-time defending national champion San Francisco Dons 80–56; Chamberlain scored 32 points, grabbed 11 rebounds, and had (at least (Note: The game film is unclear whether an eighth block occurred or the ball fell short due to Chamberlain's intimidation.)) seven blocked shots. Chamberlain's performance led Kansas to an insurmountable lead, and he rested on the bench for the final three-and-three-quarter minutes of the game.

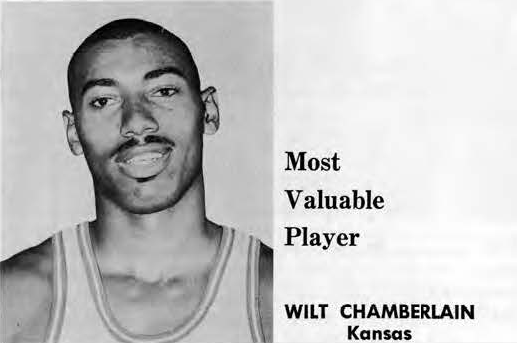
Chamberlain was named MVP of the NCAA tournament at Kansas.

In the NCAA finals, the second-ranked Kansas Jayhawks played the top-ranked, undefeated North Carolina Tar Heels, led by All-American and National Player of the Year Lennie Rosenbluth. Tar Heels coach Frank McGuire used several unorthodox tactics to thwart Chamberlain. For the tip-off, he sent his shortest player Tommy Kearns to upset Chamberlain; and the Tar Heels spent the rest of the night triple-teaming him, one defender in front, one behind, and a third arriving as soon as he got the ball. With the Tar Heels' fixation on Chamberlain, the Jayhawks shot only 27% from the field in contrast with 64% for the Tar Heels, and trailed 22–29 at halftime. With 10 minutes to go, North Carolina led 40–37 and stalled the game as they passed the ball around with no intention of scoring a basket. After several Tar Heel turnovers, the game was tied at 46 at the end of regulation.

Each team scored two points in the first overtime; Kansas froze the ball in return during the second overtime, keeping the game tied at 48. In the third overtime, the Tar Heels scored two consecutive baskets but Chamberlain executed a three-point play, leaving KU trailing 52–51. After King scored a basket, Kansas was ahead by one point. With 10 seconds remaining, Tar Heels' center Joe Quigg pump faked then drove to the basket. Chamberlain blocked Quigg's shot but was also called for the foul. Quigg made his two foul shots to put the Tar Heels up 54–53. For the final play, Harp called for Ron Loneski to pass the ball into Chamberlain in the low post but Quigg tipped the pass and Kearns recovered it, and the Tar Heels won the game.

Despite the loss, Chamberlain, who scored 23 points and 14 rebounds, was elected the Most Outstanding Player of the Final Four. Chamberlain considered it the most painful loss of his life, the first time his team lost despite his impressive individual statistics. It is considered by sportswriters one of the sport's greatest games: North Carolina's first of six NCAA national titles, the first national final to go into overtime and still the only one to go into triple overtime. (Note: In the semifinals, North Carolina also needed triple overtime to advance over Michigan State.)

==== Junior season (1958) ====
In Chamberlain's junior season of 1957–58, the Jayhawks' matches were increasingly frustrating for him. Knowing how good he was, opponents resorted to freeze-ball tactics and routinely used three or more players to guard him. Teammate Bob Billings commented, "It was not fun basketball ... we were just out chasing people throwing the basketball back and forth". Chamberlain averaged 30.1 points for the season and led the Jayhawks to an 18–5 record — three of the losses coming while he was out with a urinary infection. The Jayhawks' season ended because KU came in second in the league and only conference winners were invited to the NCAA tournament. Chamberlain was again named an All-American, along with future NBA Hall-of-Famers Elgin Baylor of Seattle University, Oscar Robertson of Cincinnati, and Guy Rodgers, who was now playing for Temple University.

Having lost enjoyment in NCAA basketball and wanting to earn money, Chamberlain left college and sold a story titled "Why I Am Leaving College" to Look magazine for $10,000, a large sum when NBA players earned $9,000 in a season. In two seasons at KU, he averaged 29.9 points and 18.3 rebounds per game while totaling 1,433 points and 877 rebounds. Despite only playing in 48 games and last playing in 1958, Chamberlain's 877 rebounds is still 8th all-time in Kansas history. By the time Chamberlain was 21 and not yet a professional, he had been featured in Time, Life, Look, and Newsweek.

== Professional career ==
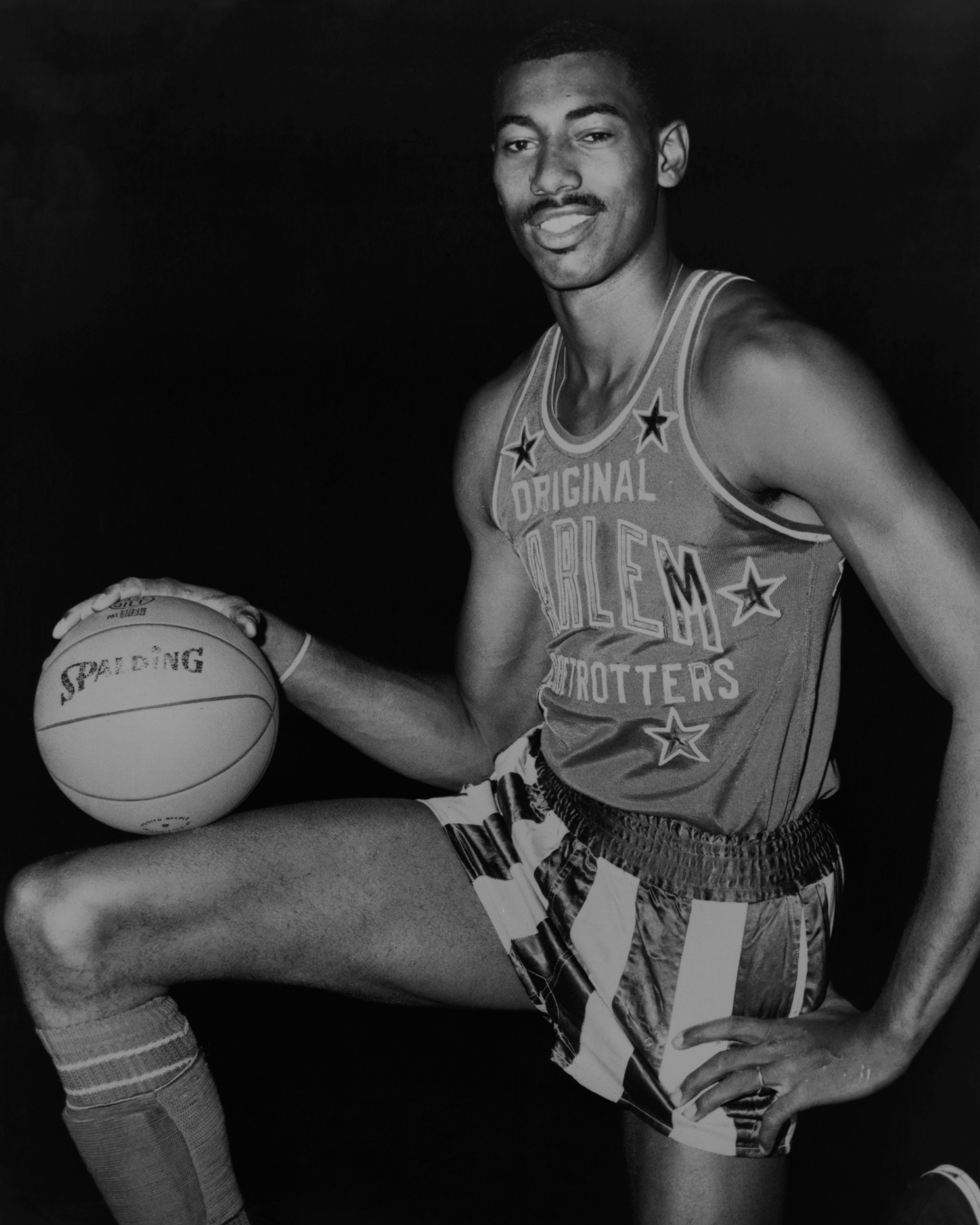
Chamberlain with the Harlem Globetrotters in 1959

=== Harlem Globetrotters (1958–1959) ===
After his frustrating junior year, Chamberlain wanted to become a professional player. At that time, the NBA did not accept players until after their college graduating class had been completed; Chamberlain decided to play for the Harlem Globetrotters in 1958 for $50,000. (Note: Equal to about $558,000 in 2019.) The team enjoyed a sold-out tour of the Soviet Union in 1959; they were greeted by General Secretary Nikita Khrushchev prior to the start of a game at Moscow's Lenin Central Stadium. One Globetrotter skit involved Captain Meadowlark Lemon collapsing to the ground; instead of helping him up, Chamberlain threw him several feet into the air and caught him like a doll. Lemon, who at that time weighed 210 lb (95 kg), later said Chamberlain was "the strongest athlete who ever lived".

In later years, Chamberlain frequently joined the Globetrotters in the off-season and fondly recalled his time there because he was no longer jeered at or asked to break records, but was one of several artists who loved to entertain audiences. On March 9, 2000, the Globetrotters retired his No. 13 jersey.

=== Philadelphia/San Francisco Warriors (1959–1965) ===
Chamberlain made his NBA debut on October 24, 1959, starting for the Philadelphia Warriors. He was listed as 7 ft 1 in (2.16 m) tall and 258 lb (117 kg). (Note: As his career progressed, he played at 275 lb (125 kg), adding more muscle, and eventually played at over 300 lb (140 kg).) He became the NBA's highest-paid player when he signed for $30,000 in his rookie contract. (Note: Equal to about $331,000 in 2019.) In comparison, the previous top earner was Bob Cousy of the Celtics with $25,000, the same sum Eddie Gottlieb used to buy the Warriors franchise in 1952.

==== 1959–60 NBA season: MVP, All-Star Game MVP and Rookie of the Year ====
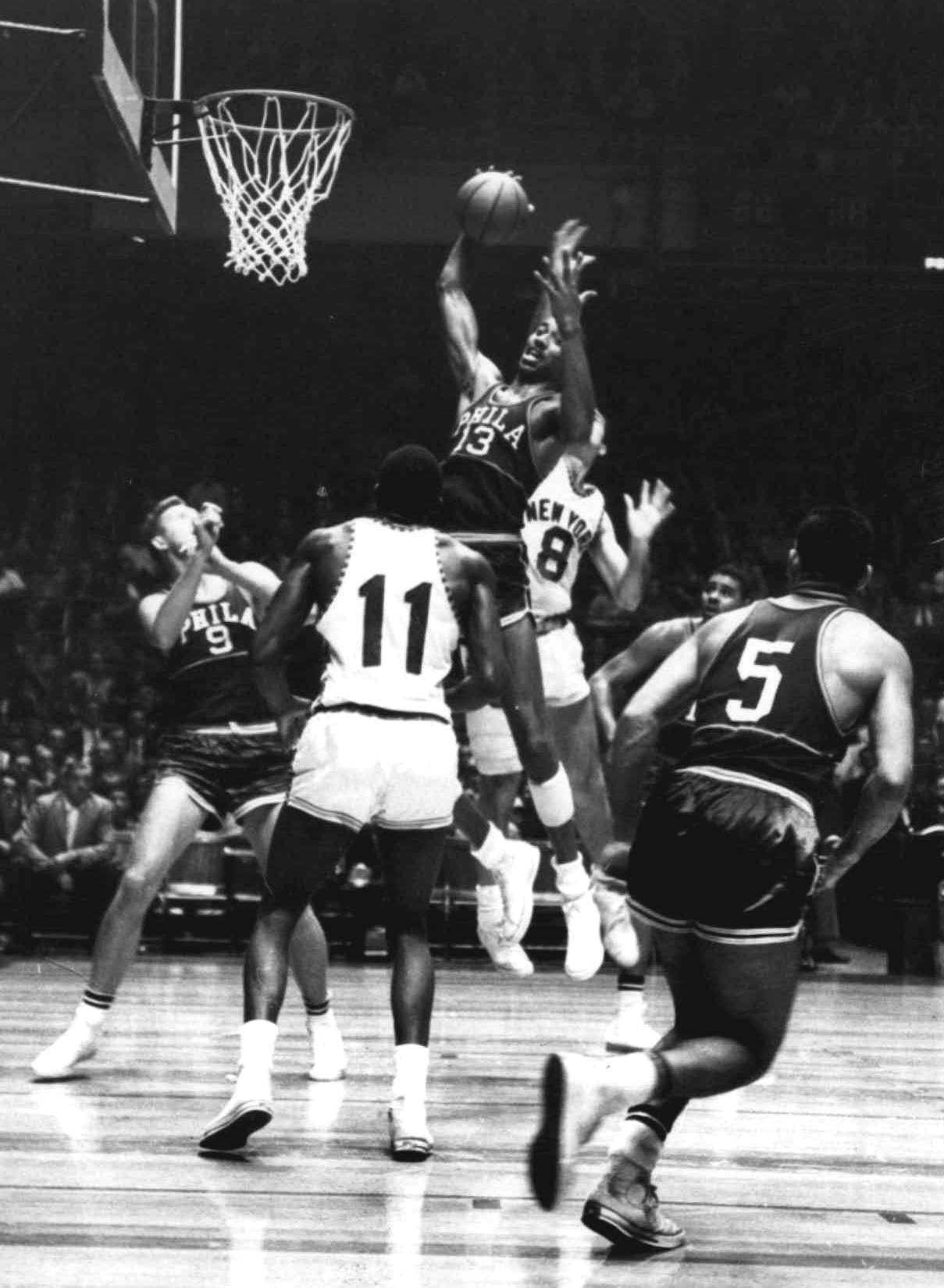
Chamberlain grabbing a rebound during a 1960 game against the New York Knicks

In the 1959–60 NBA season, Chamberlain joined a Philadelphia Warriors squad that was coached by Neil Johnston. All five starters were native Philadelphians: Chamberlain, Tom Gola, Guy Rodgers, Hall-of-Fame forward Paul Arizin, and Ernie Beck. In his first NBA game, played against the New York Knicks, Chamberlain scored 43 points and grabbed 28 rebounds. In his third game, Chamberlain recorded 41 points and a then-career-high 40 rebounds in a 124–113 win over the visiting Syracuse Nationals. In his fourth game, Philadelphia played the reigning champion Boston Celtics—who were coached by Auerbach, whose offer Chamberlain had rejected several years before—and Bill Russell, who was lauded as one of the best defensive pivots in the game.

In the first of many match-ups, Chamberlain outscored Russell with 30 points against Russell's 28 points, but Boston won the game and the Chamberlain–Russell rivalry would grow to become one of the NBA's greatest of all time. On November 10, 1959, Chamberlain posted 39 points and a new career-high 43 rebounds in a 126–125 win over the visiting Knicks. He recorded a rock n' roll record in January 1960, singing That's Easy to Say and By the River.

Chamberlain was selected to the Eastern Conference All-Star team, winning the All-Star Game and the All-Star Game MVP award with a 23-point, 25-rebound performance. On January 25, 1960, Chamberlain had 50 points and 40 rebounds in an NBA game, a rare occurrence. During the game against the Detroit Pistons, Chamberlain recorded 58 points, 42 rebounds, and 4 assists in a winning effort. His 58 points were a then-career-high, and he later tied that on February 21, when he recorded 58 points and 24 rebounds in a 131–121 win over the visiting Knicks.

In his first NBA season, Chamberlain averaged 37.6 points, 27.0 rebounds and 46.4 minutes played, breaking the previous regular-season records. To this day no other player has ever averaged more rebounds or minutes played in a season, and only one player, Elgin Baylor, has ever averaged more points in a season than Chamberlain did in his rookie year. He needed only 56 games to score 2,102 points, breaking the all-time regular-season scoring record of Bob Pettit, who needed 72 games to score 2,101 points. Chamberlain broke eight NBA records, and he was named both Rookie of the Year and MVP that season. (Note: A feat matched only by fellow Hall-of-Famer Wes Unseld in the 1968–69 NBA season.)

The Warriors entered the 1960 NBA playoffs and beat the Syracuse Nationals, setting up a game against the Eastern Division-champion Celtics. According to Cherry, Celtics coach Auerbach ordered his forward Tom Heinsohn to commit personal fouls on Chamberlain; whenever the Warriors took foul shots, Heinsohn grabbed and shoved Chamberlain to prevent him from running back quickly. Auerbach's intention was for the Celtics to throw the ball quickly enough to prevent Chamberlain, a prolific shot-blocker, from returning to his own basket in time, and Boston could score an easy fastbreak basket. The teams split the first two games but Chamberlain became annoyed with Heinsohn and punched him during Game 3. In the scuffle, Chamberlain injured his hand, and Philadelphia lost the next two games. In Game 5, with his hand healthy, Chamberlain recorded 50 points and 35 rebounds in a 128–107 win over the Celtics, extending the series to a Game 6. (Note: As of 2019, he is the first and the only player in NBA history to record 50 points and 35 rebounds in an NBA playoff game.) In Game 6, Heinsohn scored the decisive basket with a last-second tip-in, and the Warriors lost the series 4–2.

Chamberlain then shocked Warriors' fans by saying he was thinking of retiring. He was tired of being double-teamed or triple-teamed, and of teams executing hard personal fouls on him. He also expressed a constant fear that he might lose his temper one day. Celtics forward Heinsohn said, "Half the fouls against him were hard fouls ... he took the most brutal pounding of any player ever". Gottlieb coaxed Chamberlain back into the NBA with a salary increase to $65,000. (Note: Equal to about $707,000 in 2019.)

==== 1960–61 NBA season: scoring, rebounding, durability, and field goal titles ====
Chamberlain's 1960–61 NBA season started with a 42-point and 31-rebound performance in a 133–123 road win against the Syracuse Nationals. On November 24, 1960, Chamberlain grabbed an NBA-record 55 rebounds, along with 34 points and 4 assists, in a 132–129 home loss against the Russell-led Boston Celtics. On November 29, Chamberlain recorded 44 points, 38 rebounds, and a then-career-high 7 assists in a 122–121 road win over the Los Angeles Lakers.

Chamberlain exceeded his rookie-season statistics, averaging 38.4 points and 27.2 rebounds per game. He became the first player to score more than 3,000 points, and the first and still the only player to exceed 2,000 rebounds in a single season, grabbing 2,149 boards. Chamberlain won his first field-goal percentage title, scored almost 32% of his team's points, and collected 30.4% of their rebounds. Chamberlain failed to convert his play into team success, this time bowing out against the Nationals in a three-game sweep. According to Cherry, Chamberlain was "difficult" and did not respect coach Johnston, who was unable to handle him. In retrospect, Gottlieb said, "My mistake was not getting a strong-handed coach ... [Johnston] wasn't ready for big time".

==== 1961–62 NBA season: 100-point game and 42-point All-Star Game record ====
In the 1961–62 NBA season, the Warriors were coached by Frank McGuire, who had masterminded Chamberlain's triple-overtime loss in the NCAA championship against the Tar Heels. In that year, Chamberlain set several all-time records which have since never been threatened; he averaged 50.4 points and grabbed 25.7 rebounds per game.

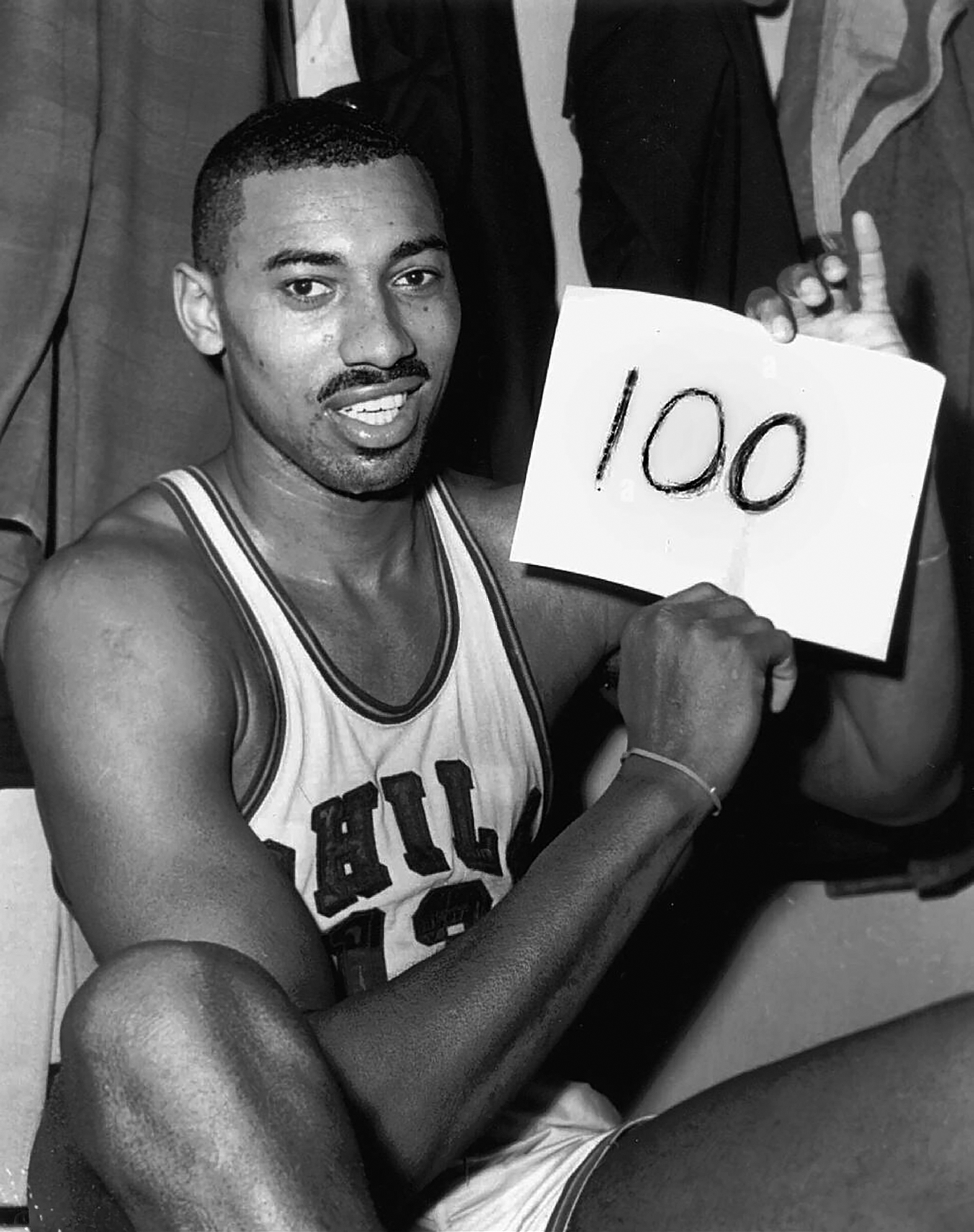
Chamberlain holds a sign with the number "100" after his record-setting 100-point game in 1962.

Chamberlain's 4,029 regular-season points made him the only player to score more than 4,000 points. (Note: The only other player to break the 3,000-point barrier is Michael Jordan, with 3,041 points in the 1986–87 NBA season.) Chamberlain posted 2,052 rebounds and played for an average of 48.53 minutes per game, playing 3,882 of his team's 3,890 minutes. Because Chamberlain played in overtime games, he averaged more minutes per game than the regulation 48 and would have played every minute if he had not been ejected in one game after picking up a second technical foul with eight minutes left to play.

On March 2, 1962, on a neutral court against the New York Knicks in Hershey, Pennsylvania, Chamberlain scored 100 points. He shot 36 of 63 from the field and uncharacteristically made 28 of 32 free throws. Joe Ruklick got the assist for Chamberlain's 100th point. The game was not recorded on video, and only a radio broadcast of the fourth quarter remains. One writer notes the lack of video of the 100-point game "only added to its mystique". For years, former NBA Commissioner David Stern's office phone would play announcer Bill Campbell's call of the 100-point basket to callers on hold: "He made it! He made it! He made it! A Dipper Dunk!"

In addition to Chamberlain's regular-season accomplishments, he scored 42 points in the All-Star Game. (Note: A record that stood until broken by Anthony Davis in 2017.) In the playoffs, the Warriors again played against the Boston Celtics in the Eastern Division Finals; both Cousy and Russell called this season the greatest Celtics team of all time. Each team won their home games so the series was split at three after six games. In a closely contested Game 7, Chamberlain tied the game at 107 with 16 seconds to go but Celtics' shooting guard Sam Jones hit a clutch shot with two seconds left to win the series for Boston. In later years, Chamberlain was criticized for averaging 50 points but not winning a title; McGuire said "Wilt has been simply super-human" and that the Warriors lacked a consistent second scorer, a playmaker, and a second big man to take pressure off Chamberlain.

==== 1962–63 NBA season: individual success, move to San Francisco, and playoff miss ====
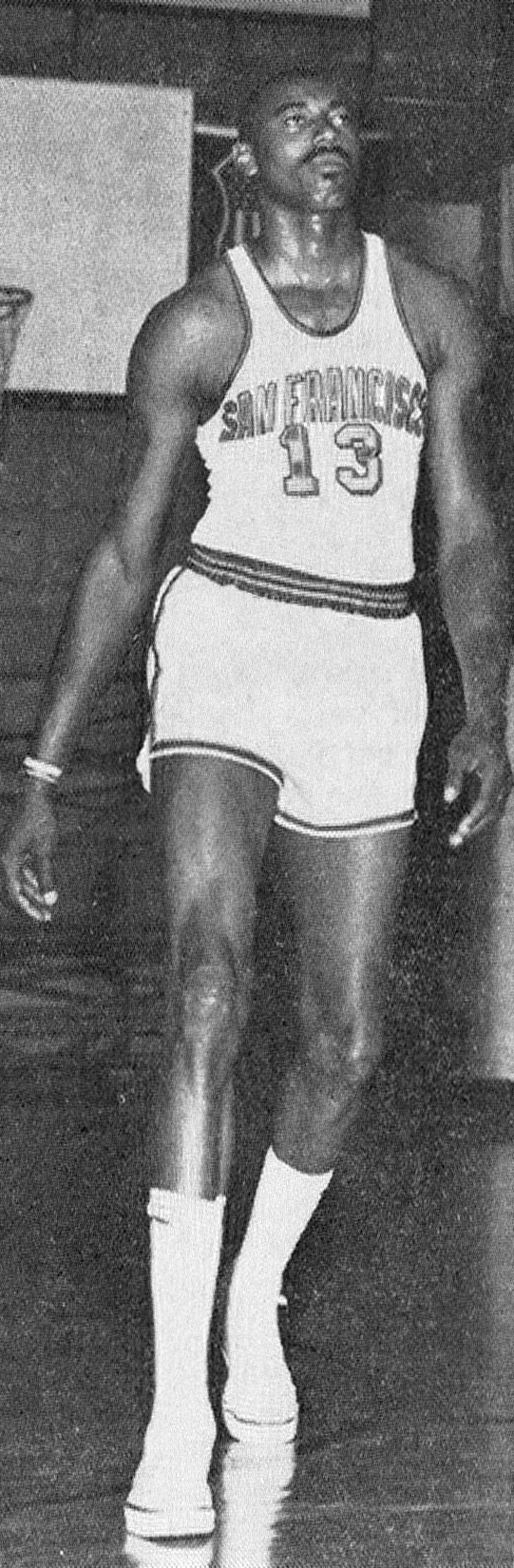
Chamberlain in 1962

In the 1962–63 NBA season, Gottlieb sold the Warriors franchise for $850,000 (Note: Equal to about $9.05 million in 2019.) to a group of businessmen led by Franklin Mieuli from San Francisco and the team relocated and were renamed the San Francisco Warriors under new coach Bob Feerick. This meant the Warriors team dispersed; Arizin chose to retire rather than move away from his family and his job at IBM in Philadelphia, coach McGuire resigned rather than move to the West Coast, and Gola was homesick and requesting a trade to the New York Knicks halfway through the season. With both secondary scorers gone, Chamberlain continued exceeding his own statistics, averaging 44.8 points and 24.3 rebounds per game that year. Despite his individual success, the Warriors lost 49 of their 80 games and missed the playoffs. His 3,586 points for that year set NBA records for the most scored by a player on a team with a losing season along with the most by a team that missed the playoffs; neither of these records have been surpassed.

==== 1963–64 NBA season: first NBA Finals loss to the Celtics ====
In the 1963–64 NBA season, Chamberlain got another new coach, former NBA player and ex-soldier Alex Hannum, and was joined by rookie center Nate Thurmond, who later entered the Hall of Fame. Hannum, who later entered the Hall of Fame as a coach, was a crafty psychologist who emphasized defense and passing, and was not afraid to stand up to the dominant Chamberlain, who would not communicate with coaches he did not like. Backed up by Thurmond, Chamberlain recorded 36.9 points and 22.3 rebounds per game, and the Warriors reached the NBA Finals. In that series, they again succumbed to Russell's Boston Celtics, losing 4–1. According to Cherry, Chamberlain and Hannum deserved much credit because Hannum had taken the previous year's 31–49 squad plus Thurmond, and became an NBA Finals contender.

In mid-1964, Chamberlain, a prominent participant at Rucker Park basketball court in New York City, made the acquaintance of Lew Alcindor, a tall, talented, 17-year-old who played there. Alcindor was soon allowed into Chamberlain's inner circle and quickly idolized the ten-year-older Chamberlain. The pair later developed an intense rivalry and personal antipathy.

=== Philadelphia 76ers (1965–1968) ===
==== 1964–65 NBA season: trade to the 76ers, division finals loss to the Celtics ====
In the 1964–65 NBA season, the NBA widened the lane from 12 to 16 feet (3.7 to 4.9 m), especially because of centers like Chamberlain. The Warriors' season began poorly and they experienced financial trouble. At the 1965 All-Star Weekend, Chamberlain was traded to the Philadelphia 76ers, the renamed former-rival and relocated Syracuse Nationals. Chamberlain did not like Sixers coach Dolph Schayes, who he thought had made several disrespectful remarks when they were rival players. The Warriors received $150,000 (Note: Equal to about $1.53 million in 2019.) and Paul Neumann, Connie Dierking, and Lee Shaffer—who opted to retire rather than report to the Warriors. When Chamberlain left the Warriors, owner Franklin Mieuli said: "Chamberlain is not an easy man to love ... the fans in San Francisco never learned to love him. Wilt is easy to hate ... people came to see him lose."

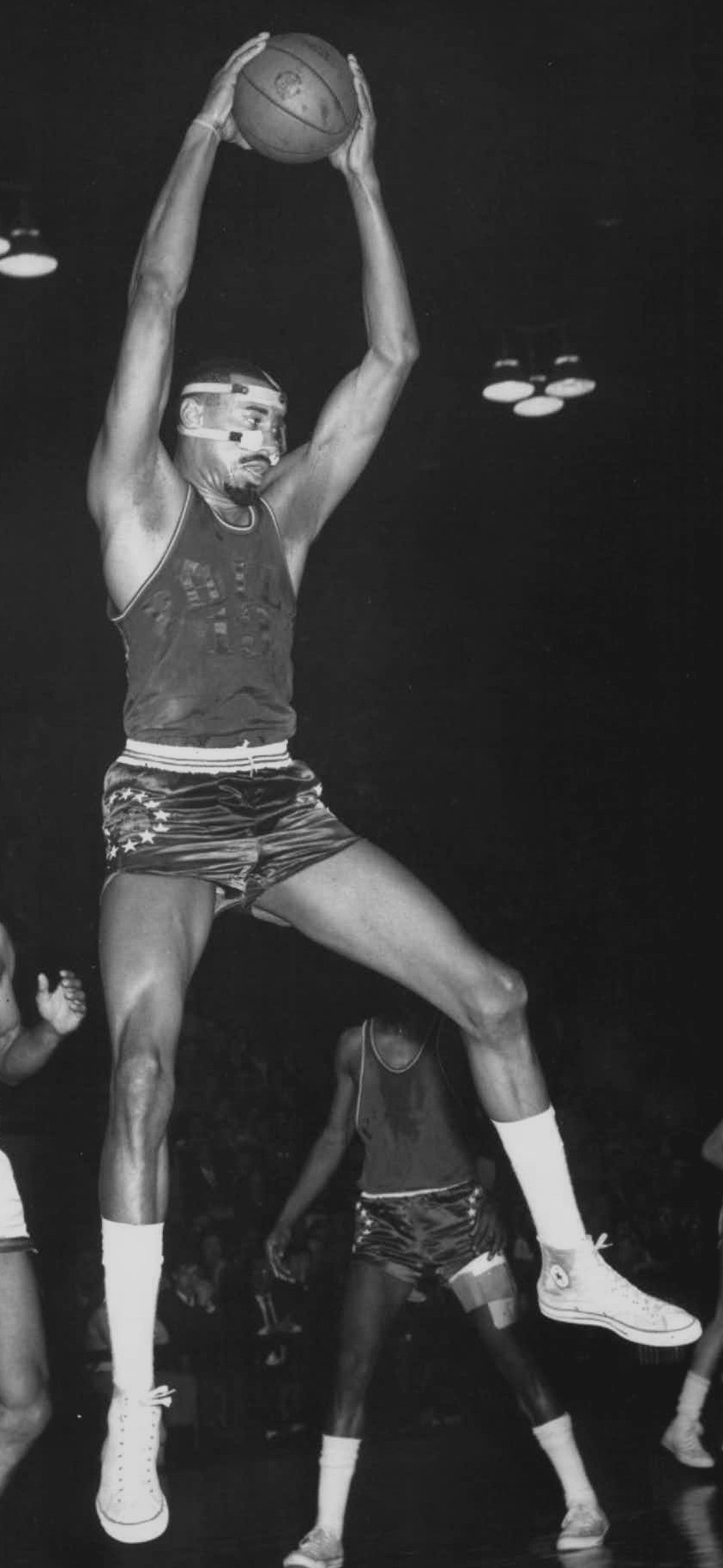
Chamberlain with the Sixers

After the trade, a reluctant Chamberlain found himself on a promising Sixers team that included veteran shooting guard and future Hall-of-Famer Hal Greer and talented role-players such as point guard Larry Costello, small forward Chet Walker, and centers Johnny "Red" Kerr and Lucious Jackson. (Note: Reportedly, Chamberlain once broke Kerr's toe with a slam dunk.) The team also included All-Rookie forward Billy Cunningham in the new sixth man role. Cherry noted there was tension within the team because Greer was the formerly undisputed leader and was not willing to give up his authority, and Jackson, a talented center, was now forced to play power forward because Chamberlain occupied the center spot. As the season progressed; however, the three began to work together more closely.

Chamberlain posted 34.7 points and 22.9 rebounds per game overall for the season. Future Georgetown coach John Thompson, then a rookie for the Boston Celtics, elbowed Chamberlain in the face and broke his nose, causing him to wear a face mask in several games. After defeating the Cincinnati Royals—a team led by fellow All-American Oscar Robertson—in the playoffs, the Sixers played against Chamberlain's rival Boston Celtics; the press called it an even match in all positions, even at center, where Russell was expected to give Chamberlain a tough battle. The teams split the first six games and the last game was held in the Celtics' Boston Garden because of their better season record. In that Game 7, Chamberlain scored 30 points and 32 rebounds while Russell logged 16 points, 27 rebounds, and eight assists.

In the final minute, Chamberlain hit two clutch free throws and slam dunked on Russell, reducing Boston's lead to 110–109 with five seconds left. Russell's inbounds pass hit a guy-wire supporting the backboard, giving the ball back to the Sixers. Coach Schayes called timeout and decided it would be unwise to pass the ball to Chamberlain, whom he feared the Celtics would intentionally foul. Red Kerr set a pick on Sam Jones to free Chet Walker. When Greer attempted to inbound the ball to Walker, John Havlicek stole the ball to preserve the Celtics' lead. (Note: Announcer Johnny Most's radio call was dubbed by the NBA as the most famous in basketball history.) For the fifth time in seven years, Russell's team deprived Chamberlain of the title. According to Chamberlain, it was in this game people started calling him a loser. In an interview in the April 1965 issue of Sports Illustrated, Chamberlain criticized his fellow players, coaches, and NBA administrators. Chamberlain later said he could see in hindsight the interview was instrumental in damaging his public image.

==== 1965–66 NBA season: MVP and second division finals loss to the Celtics ====
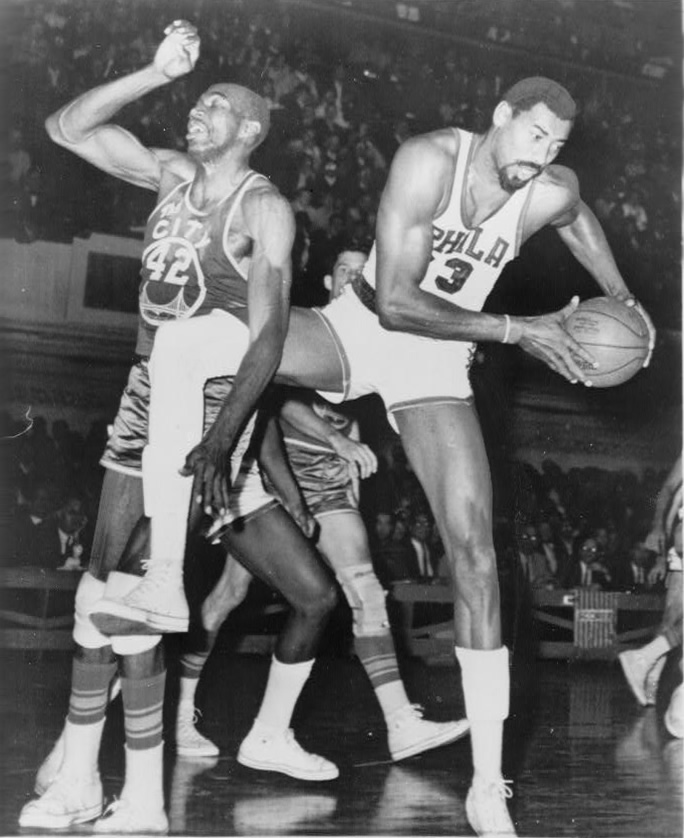
Chamberlain (right) and Nate Thurmond of the San Francisco Warriors competing for a rebound

In the 1965–66 NBA season, Ike Richman, the Sixers' co-owner as well as Chamberlain's confidant and lawyer, died of a heart attack while attending a road game in Boston. The Sixers posted a 55–25 regular-season record and Chamberlain won his second MVP award. In that season, Chamberlain again dominated his opposition by recording 33.5 points and 24.6 rebounds a game, leading the league in both categories. In one game, Chamberlain dislocated the shoulder of Baltimore Bullets player Gus Johnson by blocking his dunk attempt.

Off the court, Chamberlain's commitment to the team was doubted because he was a late sleeper and lived in New York City, preferring to commute to Philadelphia rather than live there, and he was only available for training in the afternoon. Because Schayes did not want to risk angering his best player, he scheduled the daily workout at 4 pm. This angered the rest of the team, who preferred an early schedule that allowed them the afternoon off but Schayes dismissed their protests. Irv Kosloff, who owned the Sixers alone after Richman's death, unsuccessfully pleaded with Chamberlain to move to Philadelphia during the season.

In the playoffs, the Sixers again played the Boston Celtics and for the first time had home-court advantage. Boston won the first two games on the road, winning 115–96 and 114–93; while Chamberlain played within his usual range, his fellow team members shot under 40%. This caused sports journalist Joe McGinnis to comment, "The Celtics played like champions and the Sixers just played". In Game 3, Chamberlain scored 31 points and 27 rebounds for the road win. When coach Schayes planned to hold a joint team practice the next day, Chamberlain said he was too tired to attend and refused Schayes' plea to attend and shoot a few foul shots with the team. In Game 4, Boston won 114–108. Prior to Game 5, Chamberlain skipped practice and was non-accessible. Schayes defended Chamberlain as "excused from practice" but his teammates knew the truth and were less forgiving. In Game 5, Chamberlain scored 46 points and grabbed 34 rebounds, but the Celtics won the game 120–112 and the series. According to Cherry, Chamberlain was the only Sixers player who performed in the series but his unprofessional, egotistical behavior set a poor example for his teammates.

==== 1966–67 NBA season: back-to-back MVP and first NBA title ====
Prior to the 1966–67 NBA season, Schayes was replaced by the more-assertive Alex Hannum. According to Cherry, in a locker room meeting, Hannum addressed several key issues he observed during the last season, several of them putting Chamberlain in an unfavorable light. Sixers forward Walker said on several occasions, players had to pull Chamberlain and Hannum apart to prevent a fistfight. Cunningham commented Hannum "never backed down" and "showed who was the boss", winning Chamberlain's respect. When emotions dissipated, Hannum told Chamberlain he was also trying to win a title but that to achieve this, Chamberlain had to "act like a man" both on and off the court. Hannum persuaded Chamberlain to change his style of play and wanted Chamberlain to concentrate more on defense than on trying to score. Kerr was traded to the Baltimore Bullets for point guard Wali Jones, and shooting guard Matt Guokas was selected in the first round of the 1966 NBA draft.

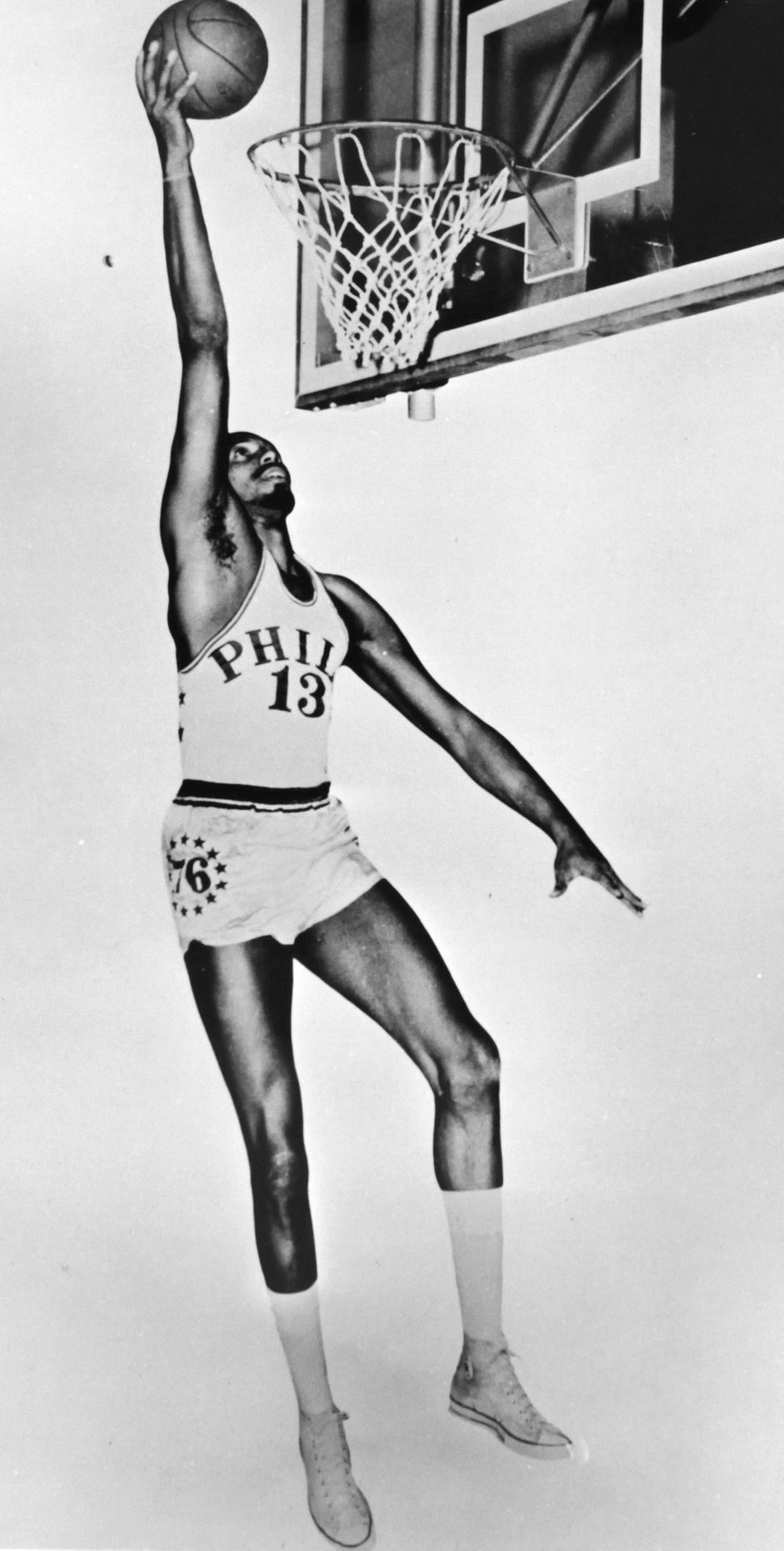
Chamberlain in 1967

As a result of his style-of-play change, Chamberlain averaged a career-low 24.1 points and took only 14% of the team's shots, (Note: In his 50.4 points per game season, it was 35.3%.) but was extremely efficient with a record-breaking .683 field-goal accuracy. He also led the league in rebounds per game (24.2), was third in assists per game (7.8), and played strong defense. His efficiency that season was reflected by 35 consecutive made field goals over four games in February. For these achievements, Chamberlain earned his third MVP award. The Sixers had a then-record 68–13 season, including a record 46–4 start. The formerly egotistical Chamberlain began to praise his teammates, lauding hardworking Lucious Jackson as the "ultimate power forward"; calling Greer a deadly jump-shooter; and Jones an excellent defender and outside scorer. Off the court, Chamberlain invited the team to restaurants and paid the entire bill, knowing he earned ten times more than the others. Greer, who was considered a consummate professional and often clashed with Chamberlain because of his attitude, spoke positively of him, saying, "You knew in a minute the Big Fella [Chamberlain] was ready to go ... and everybody would follow".

In the playoffs, the Sixers again played the Boston Celtics in the Eastern Division Finals and held home-court advantage. In Game 1, the Sixers beat Boston 127–112, powered by Greer's 39 points and Chamberlain's unofficial quadruple double, with 24 points, 32 rebounds, 13 assists, and 12 unofficially counted blocks. In Game 2, the Sixers won 107–102 in overtime and player-coach Russell grudgingly praised Chamberlain for intimidating the Celtics into taking low-percentage shots from further outside. In Game 3, Chamberlain grabbed 41 rebounds and helped the Sixers win 115–104. The Celtics prevented a sweep by winning Game 4 with a 121–117 victory. Russell, who was coming close to the first real loss of his career, said, "Right now, he [Chamberlain] is playing like me [to win]". In Game 5, the Sixers outscored the Celtics 140–116, ending Boston's historic run of eight consecutive NBA titles. Chamberlain scored 29 points, 36 rebounds, and 13 assists, and was praised by the Celtics' Russell and K. C. Jones. Philadelphia fans chanted "Boston is dead".

In the 1967 NBA Finals, the Sixers played against Chamberlain's old team the San Francisco Warriors, who were led by future Hall-of-Famers: star forward Rick Barry and center Nate Thurmond. The Sixers won the first two games; Chamberlain and Greer took credit for defense and clutch shooting. The Warriors won game 3, the Sixers won game 4 with Chamberlain contributing an unofficial 10 blocked shots, and the Warriors won game 5; so Philadelphia was up 3–2 prior to Game 6. In Game 6, the Warriors were trailing 123–122 with 15 seconds left. For the last play, Thurmond and Barry tried a pick and roll against Chamberlain and Walker, but the Sixers foiled it because Walker held up Thurmond's ability to roll and Barry was defended by Chamberlain, making it impossible to shoot. By the time Barry made his move, Walker recovered back to Barry, who was stuck in the air and botched the shot. Jackson forced a jump ball on the rebound and the Sixers won the championship. Chamberlain, who contributed with 17.7 points and 28.7 rebounds per game against Thurmond, snaring at least 23 rebounds in the six games, said, "It is wonderful to be a part of the greatest team in basketball ... being a champion is like having a big round glow inside of you". This Sixers team has been ranked as one of the best in NBA history.

==== 1967–68 NBA season: third straight MVP and assist champion ====
In the 1967–68 NBA season, the relationship between Chamberlain and Sixers' owner Kosloff continued to deteriorate. In 1965, Chamberlain said he and Richman had worked out a deal that would give Chamberlain 25% of the franchise once he ended his career. Although there is no written proof of this agreement, Schayes and Sixers' lawyer Alan Levitt assumed Chamberlain was correct. Kosloff declined the request, angering Chamberlain, who was willing to move to the rival American Basketball Association (ABA) once his contract ended in 1967. Kosloff and Chamberlain worked out a truce and later signed a one-year, $250,000 contract.

On the court, Chamberlain continued his focus on team play, and registered 24.3 points and 23.8 rebounds a game for the season. On March 18, 1968, in a 158–128 victory against the Los Angeles Lakers, Chamberlain had a quintuple-double with 53 points, 32 rebounds, 14 assists, 24 blocks, and 11 steals. Chamberlain also recorded then the most points in a triple-double. (Note: A record since broken by Russell Westbrook in 2017 and improved by James Harden in 2018.) The 76ers had the best record in the league for the third consecutive season, and Chamberlain became the first center in NBA history to finish the season as the leader in assists; (Note: The NBA leader was based on total assists through the 1968–69 season, changing to assists per game average afterwards. Center Nikola Jokić led the NBA in assists in 2025–26 with 10.9 per game.) his total of 702 beating runner-up point guard and future Hall-of-Famer Lenny Wilkens' total by 23. Chamberlain likened his assist title to baseball home-run hitter Babe Ruth leading the league in sacrifice bunts, and felt he dispelled the myth he was incapable or unwilling to pass the ball.

For these achievements, Chamberlain won his fourth and final MVP title. He also scored his 25,000th point, making him the first-ever player to score that many points; he gave the ball to team physician Stan Lorber. The Sixers won 62 games and took the first seed of the playoffs. In the Eastern Division Semifinals, they played against the New York Knicks. In a physically tough matchup, the Sixers lost sixth man Cunningham with a broken hand, and Chamberlain, Greer, and Jackson were struggling with inflamed feet, sore knees, and pulled hamstrings, respectively. Going ahead 3–2, the Sixers defeated the Knicks 115–97 in Game 6 after Chamberlain scored 25 points and 27 rebounds; Chamberlain had a successful series leading both teams in points (153), rebounds (145), and assists (38).

In the Eastern Division Finals, the Sixers played against the Boston Celtics, again with home-court advantage and this time as reigning champions. Despite the Sixers' injury woes, coach Hannum was confident that they could "take the Celtics in less than seven games", and referenced the higher age of the Celtics, a team built around Russell and Jones, both 34. On April 4, civil rights leader Martin Luther King Jr was assassinated. With eight of the ten starting players on the Sixers and Celtics being African-American, both teams were in deep shock and there were calls to cancel the series. In a game the following day, called "unreal" and "devoid of emotion", the Sixers lost 127–118. After attending King's funeral, Chamberlain called out to the angry rioters who were setting fires all over the country, stating King would not have approved. In Game 2, Philadelphia evened the series with a 115–106 victory, and won Games 3 and 4, with Chamberlain suspiciously often played by Celtics backup center Wayne Embry, causing the press to speculate Russell was worn down. Prior to Game 5, the Sixers seemed poised to win the series because no NBA team had overcome a 3–1 deficit before. The Celtics; however, rallied, winning the next two games 122–104 and 114–106, respectively, powered by a spirited John Havlicek and helped by the Sixers' poor shooting.

In Game 7, 15,202 Philadelphia fans witnessed a 100–96 defeat for the Sixers, making it the first time in NBA history a team lost a series after leading 3–1. According to Cherry, the Sixers shot poorly—Greer, Jones, Walker, Jackson, and Guokas hit a combined 25 of 74 shots—while Chamberlain grabbed 34 rebounds and shot 4-of-9 for a total of 14 points. In the second half of Game 7, Chamberlain did not attempt a shot from the field. Cherry said there is a strange pattern in that game because in a typical Sixers game, Chamberlain got the ball 60 times in the low post but only 23 times in Game 7, with seven in the third quarter and twice in the fourth quarter. Chamberlain later blamed coach Hannum for the lack of touches, a point Hannum conceded. Cherry comments Chamberlain, who always thought of himself as the best player of all time, should have been outspoken enough to demand the ball.

The loss meant Chamberlain was 1–6 in playoff series against the Celtics. After that season, Hannum wanted to be closer to his family on the West Coast; he left the Sixers to coach the Oakland Oaks in the newly founded ABA. Chamberlain then asked for a trade and Sixers general manager Jack Ramsay traded him to the Los Angeles Lakers for Darrall Imhoff, Archie Clark, and Jerry Chambers. The motivation for this move remains in dispute. According to sportswriter Roland Lazenby, a journalist close to the Lakers, Chamberlain was angry at Kosloff for breaking the purported Chamberlain–Richman deal. According to Ramsay, Chamberlain threatened to move to the ABA after Hannum left and forced the trade. According to Cherry, there are several personal reasons, among them Chamberlain feeling he had grown too big for Philadelphia and sought the presence of fellow celebrities, of which there were plenty in Los Angeles, and that he wanted the opportunity to date white women, which was possible for a black man in Los Angeles but less acceptable elsewhere.

=== Los Angeles Lakers (1968–1973) ===
==== 1968–69 NBA season: second NBA finals loss to the Celtics ====
On July 9, 1968, the trade between the Los Angeles Lakers and the Sixers was completed, making it the first time a reigning NBA MVP was traded the next season. Lakers owner Jack Kent Cooke gave Chamberlain an unprecedented contract, paying him $250,000 after taxes—about $2.3 million in real value; in comparison, previous Lakers top earner Jerry West was paid $100,000 before taxes—about $930,000 in real value.

For the 1968–69 NBA season, Chamberlain joined a squad that included his fellow former All-American forward Elgin Baylor, Hall-of-Fame guard Jerry West, backup center Mel Counts, forwards Keith Erickson and Tom Hawkins, and 5 ft 11 in (1.80 m) guard Johnny Egan. According to Cherry, Chamberlain was not a natural leader or a loyal follower, which made it difficult to fit in. While he was on cordial terms with West, Chamberlain often argued with team captain Baylor, later saying in regard to Baylor: "We were good friends, but ... [in] black culture ... you never let the other guy one-up you".

The lack of a second guard next to West and the lack of speed concerned coach Butch van Breda Kolff. After losing Clark and Hall-of-Fame guard Gail Goodrich, who joined the Phoenix Suns after the 1968 NBA expansion draft, he said: "Egan gets murdered on defense because of his [lack of] size ... but if I don't play him, we look like a bunch of trucks". The greatest problem was his tense relationship with van Breda Kolff. Pejoratively calling the new recruit "The Load", van Breda Kolff later said Chamberlain was egotistical, never respected him, too often slacked off in practice, and focused too much on his own statistics. Chamberlain described Van Breda Kolff as "the dumbest and worst coach ever". Erickson commented, "Butch catered to Elgin and Jerry ... and that is not a good way to get on Wilt's side ... that relationship was doomed from the start".

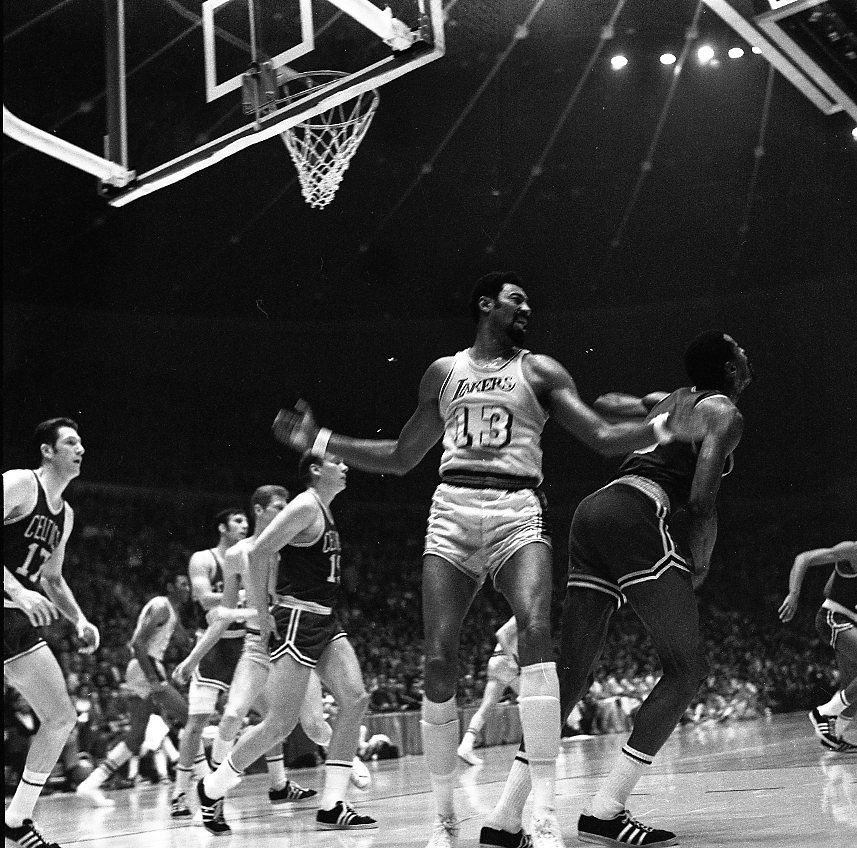
Chamberlain playing for the Los Angeles Lakers in the 1969 NBA Finals against the Boston Celtics

Chamberlain experienced an often-frustrating season. Van Breda Kolff benched him several times, which never happened before in his career; in mid-season, Chamberlain, a perennial scoring champion, had two games in which he scored only six and then two points. Playing through his problems, Chamberlain averaged 20.5 points and 21.1 rebounds a game that season. Cooke was pleased because ticket sales went up by 11% since acquiring Chamberlain.

In the playoffs, the Lakers defeated, 4–2, Chamberlain's old club the San Francisco Warriors after losing the first two games, then defeated the Atlanta Hawks, and then played Chamberlain's rivals, Russell's Boston Celtics. Going into the NBA Finals as 3-to-1 favorites, the Lakers won the first two games but lost the next two; Chamberlain was criticized as a non-factor in the series, being neutralized by Russell with little effort. In Game 4, Sam Jones again hit a clutch shot, this time off the wrong foot.

In Game 5, Chamberlain scored 13 points and grabbed 31 rebounds, leading Los Angeles to a 117–104 win. In Game 6, Chamberlain recorded 18 rebounds and 4 assists but only 8 points, and the Celtics won 99–90. Cherry criticized his performance, saying if "Chamberlain had come up big and put up a normal 30 point scoring night", the Lakers would have probably won their first championship in Los Angeles.

In Game 7, Cooke put up thousands of balloons in the rafters of the Forum in anticipation of a Lakers win, motivating the Celtics. In Game 7, the Lakers trailed 91–76 after three quarters but later rallied. Chamberlain twisted his knee after a rebound and had to be replaced by Counts. With three minutes to go, the Lakers trailed 103–102 but they committed costly turnovers and lost the game 108–106; this came despite a triple-double from West, who had 42 points, 13 rebounds, and 12 assists, and became the only player in NBA history to be named Finals MVP despite being on the losing team.

After the game, many wondered why Chamberlain sat out the final six minutes. At the time of his final substitution, Chamberlain had scored 18 points – hitting seven of his eight shots – and grabbed 27 rebounds, significantly more than the 10 points of Counts on 4-of-13 shooting. Among others, Russell did not believe Chamberlain's injury was grave and accused him of being a malingerer, stating: "Any injury short of a broken leg or a broken back is not enough". In spite of their earlier quarrels, van Breda Kolff came to Chamberlain's defense, saying the often-maligned Chamberlain hardly was able to move by the end. Van Breda Kolff was perceived as "pig-headed" for benching Chamberlain and soon resigned as Lakers coach. Cherry commented some journalists reported Game 7 destroyed two careers: "Wilt's because he wouldn't take over and van Breda Kolff because he wouldn't give in".

==== 1969–70 NBA season: first NBA finals loss to the Knicks ====
Chamberlain began the 1969–70 NBA season under new coach Joe Mullaney strongly, averaging 32.2 points and 20.6 rebounds per game over the first nine games of the season. During the ninth game, he had a serious knee injury, suffering a rupture of the patellar tendon at the base of his right kneecap, and he missed several months before appearing in the final three games of the 82-game regular season, the first season he failed to reach 20 rebounds per game. Owing to his strong start, he still put up a season-average 27.3 points, 18.4 rebounds, and 4.1 assists per game.

The Lakers again made the playoffs. In the first round, the Lakers defeated Goodrich, Connie Hawkins, and the Phoenix Suns in a seven-game series. The Lakers swept the Atlanta Hawks in the second round before ultimately reaching the NBA Finals, where they played against the New York Knicks, which included future Hall-of-Famers Willis Reed, Dave DeBusschere, Bill Bradley, and Walt Frazier. Having lost lateral speed due to his injury, Chamberlain was often too slow to block Reed's preferred high-post jump shots. The Knicks won Game 1 124–112 and Reed scored 37 points. In Game 2, Chamberlain scored 19 points, grabbed 24 rebounds, and blocked Reed's shot in the final seconds, leading the Lakers to a 105–103 win. In Game 3, West hit a 60-foot (18 m) shot at the buzzer to tie the game at 102 but the Knicks won in overtime 111–108. In Game 4, Chamberlain scored 18 points and grabbed 25 rebounds, helping tie the series at 2.

In Game 5, with the Knicks trailing by more than nine points, Reed pulled his thigh muscle and seemed to be out for the series. By convention, Chamberlain should have dominated against little-used Knicks backup centers Nate Bowman and Bill Hosket Jr., or forwards Bradley and DeBusschere, who gave up more than 6 in (150 mm) against him. Instead, the Lakers gave away their 13-point halftime lead, succumbed to the aggressive Knicks defense, and committed 19 second-half turnovers. Chamberlain and West—the Lakers' two main scorers—shot the ball only thrice and twice, respectively, in the entire second half. The Lakers lost 107–100 in what was called one of the greatest comebacks in NBA Finals history.

In Game 6, Chamberlain scored 45 points, grabbed 27 rebounds, and almost single-handedly equalized the series in a 135–113 Lakers win. With Reed out; the Knicks seemed doomed prior to Game 7 in New York City; however, the hero of Game 7 was Reed, who hobbled up court, scored the first four points, and inspired his team to one of the most-famous playoff upsets of all time. The Knicks led by 27 at halftime, and despite Chamberlain scoring 21 points, the Lakers had their third consecutive loss in Game 7. Chamberlain was criticized for his inability to dominate his injured counterpart but according to Cherry, Chamberlain's feat, coming back from a career-threatening injury, was too-quickly forgotten.

==== 1970–71 NBA season: conference finals loss and challenge to Muhammad Ali ====
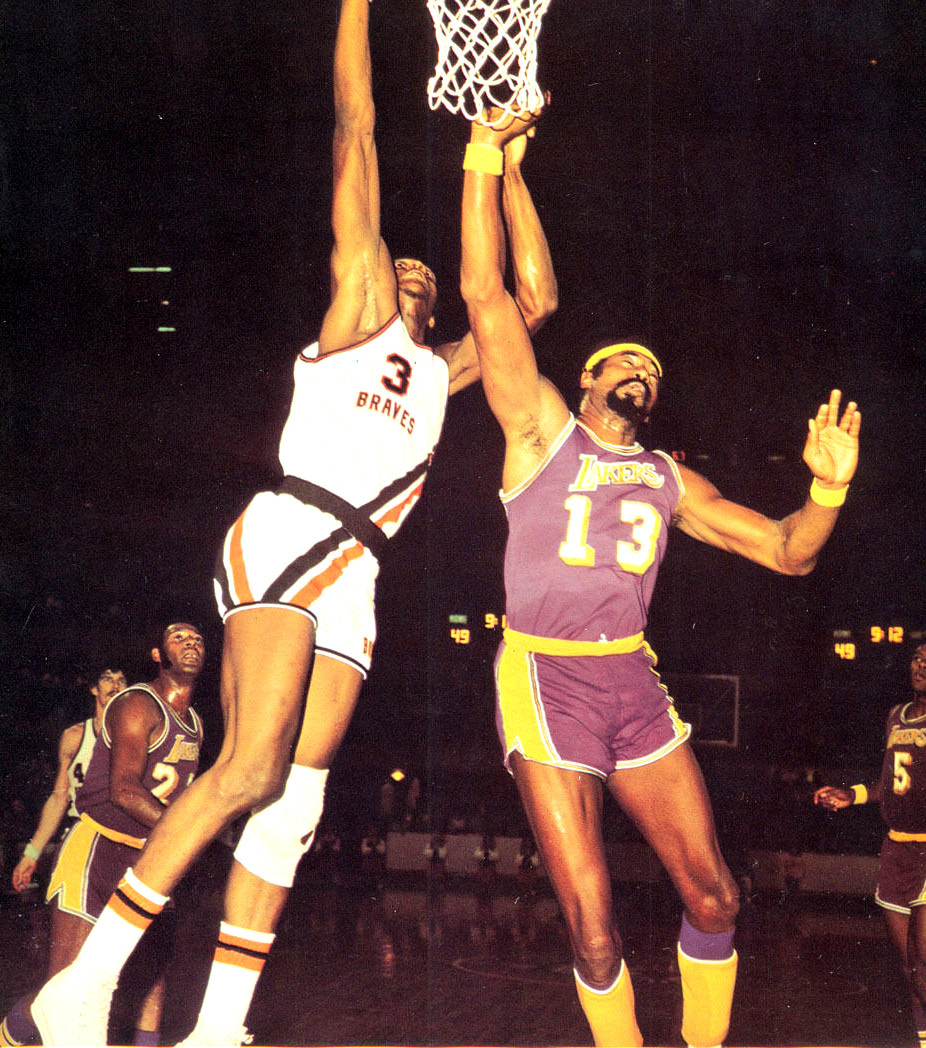
Elmore Smith and Chamberlain fighting for a rebound in 1971

In the 1970–71 NBA season, the Lakers signed Gail Goodrich, who returned from the Suns. Chamberlain averaged 20.7 points, 18.2 rebounds, and 4.3 assists; he once again led the NBA in rebounding and the Lakers won the Pacific Division title. When Hall-of-Fame Detroit Pistons center Bob Lanier, who was 6 ft 11 in (2.11 m) and 250 lb (110 kg) as a rookie, was asked about the most memorable moment of his career, Lanier answered: "When Wilt Chamberlain lifted me up and moved me like a coffee cup so he could get a favorable position".

After losing Baylor to an Achilles tendon rupture that effectively ended his career, and especially after losing West after a knee injury, the Lakers were seen as underdogs in the playoffs against the Milwaukee Bucks of Alcindor—freshly crowned MVP—and the veteran Hall-of-Fame guard Robertson, whom they played in the Western Conference Finals. After winning the regular season with 66 wins, the Bucks were seen as favorites against the depleted Lakers; many pundits were looking forward to the matchup between the 34-year-old Chamberlain and the 24-year-old Alcindor. In Game 1, Alcindor outscored Chamberlain 32–22 and the Bucks won 106–85. In Game 2, the Bucks won again despite Chamberlain scoring 26 points—four more than his Milwaukee counterpart. Prior to Game 3, the Lakers' situation worsened when West's stand-in Erickson underwent an appendectomy and was out for the season. With rookie Jim McMillian easing the scoring pressure, Chamberlain scored 24 points and grabbed 24 rebounds in a 118–107 victory but the Bucks defeated the Lakers 117–94 in Game 4 to take a 3–1 series lead. Milwaukee ended the series at home with a 116–98 victory in Game 5. Although Chamberlain lost, he was lauded for holding his own against MVP Alcindor, who was 10 years younger and healthy.

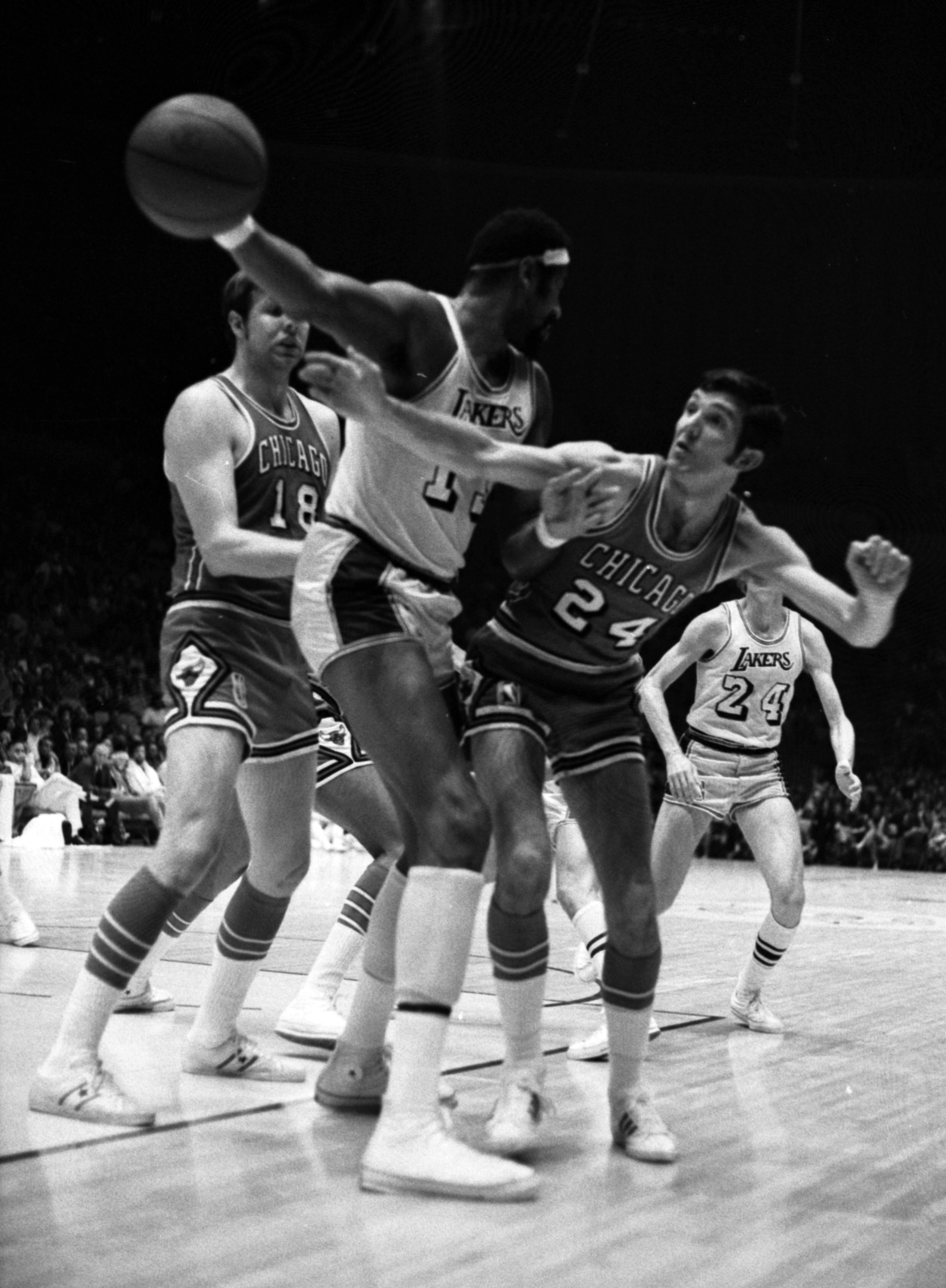
Chamberlain keeps the ball from Matt Guokas.

After the playoffs, Chamberlain challenged heavyweight boxing legend Muhammad Ali to a fight. Chamberlain trained with Cus d'Amato for the 15-round bout, set to take place on July 26, 1971, in the Houston Astrodome. (Note: In a 1999 interview, Chamberlain stated D'Amato had approached him with the idea in 1965 and 1967, offering he and Ali $5 million each.) Ali refused to be intimidated, issuing his typical public boasts, this time of "Timber!" and "The tree will fall!". In 1965, Chamberlain consulted his father, who had seen Ali fight, and advised Chamberlain against it. Cooke offered Chamberlain a record-setting contract on the condition he agreed to give up what Cooke termed "this boxing foolishness". Chamberlain ultimately used a contractual escape; Joe Frazier gave Ali his first professional loss, enabling Chamberlain to legally withdraw from the bout. Retired NFL player Jim Brown, who acted as Chamberlain's manager since 1967, got Ali's manager Jabir Herbert Muhammad to mutually withdraw from the match set to take place at Madison Square Garden.

==== 1971–72 NBA season: finals MVP and second NBA title ====
In the 1971–72 NBA season, the Lakers hired former Celtics star guard Bill Sharman as head coach. Sharman introduced morning shoot-arounds, in which the perennial latecomer Chamberlain regularly participated, in contrast to earlier years with Schayes, and transformed him into a defensive-minded, low-scoring post defender in the style of Russell. Sharman told Chamberlain to use his rebounding and passing skills to quickly initiate fastbreaks to his teammates. While no longer being the main scorer, Chamberlain was named the Lakers' new captain. After rupturing his Achilles tendon, perennial captain Baylor retired and was replaced with Chamberlain. Initially, Sharman wanted Chamberlain and West to share this duty but West declined, stating he was injury-prone and wanted to concentrate on the game. Chamberlain accepted his new roles and posted an all-time low 14.8 points per game but also 19.2 rebounds per game, and led the league with a .649 field-goal percentage. Powered by his defensive presence, the Lakers had an unprecedented 33-game winning streak, leading to a then-record 69 wins in the regular season. According to Flynn Robinson, after the record-setting streak, Lakers owner Cooke sought to reward each of his players, who may have been expecting a trip to Hawaii, with a $5 pen set. In response, Chamberlain had everybody put the pens in the middle of the floor and stepped on them.

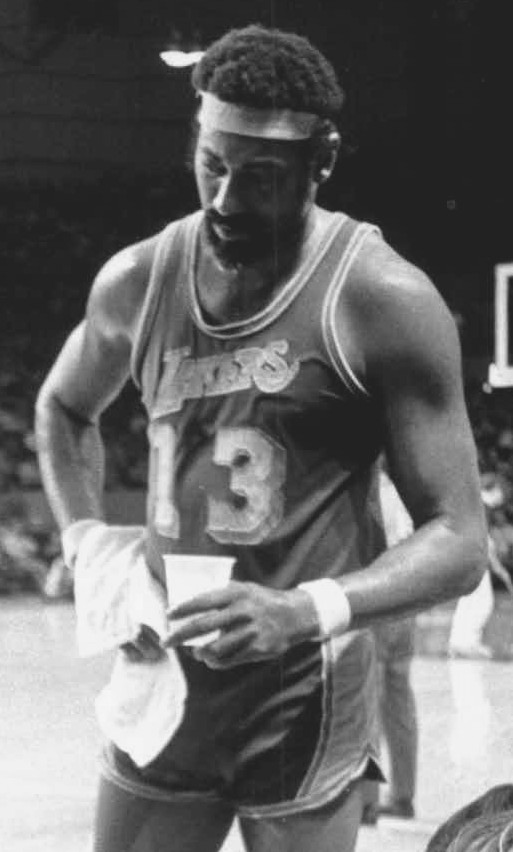
Chamberlain with the Lakers in 1972

In the playoffs, the Lakers defeated the Chicago Bulls then played against the Milwaukee Bucks, who were led by young center and regular-season MVP Kareem Abdul-Jabbar (formerly Lew Alcindor). Life called the matchup between Chamberlain and Abdul-Jabbar the greatest matchup in all sports. Chamberlain helped the Lakers defeat Abdul-Jabbar and the Bucks in six games, and he was lauded for his performance in Game 6, which the Lakers won 104–100 after trailing by 10 points in the fourth quarter. Chamberlain scored 24 points, grabbed 22 rebounds, played all 48 minutes, and outsprinted the younger Bucks center on several late Lakers fast breaks. West called it "the greatest ball-busting performance I have ever seen". Time stated, "In the N.B.A.'s western division title series with Milwaukee, [Chamberlain] decisively outplayed basketball's newest giant superstar, Kareem Abdul-Jabbar, eleven years his junior".

In the NBA Finals, the Lakers again met the New York Knicks, who were shorthanded after losing 6-foot-9-inch (2.06 m) Reed to injury, and undersized 6-foot-8-inch (2.03 m) Jerry Lucas had to defend against 7-foot-1-inch (2.16 m) Chamberlain. Prolific outside shooter Lucas helped New York to win Game 1, hitting 9 of his 11 shots in the first half. In Game 2, which the Lakers won 106–92, Chamberlain put Lucas into foul trouble and the Knicks lost defensive power forward Dave DeBusschere to injury. In Game 3, Chamberlain scored 26 points and grabbed 20 rebounds for another Lakers win.

In a fiercely battled Game 4, Chamberlain was playing with five fouls late in the game. Chamberlain had never fouled out in his career, a record for which he was very proud. Despite the risk of fouling out, Chamberlain played aggressive defense, and blocked two of Lucas' shots in overtime, proving wrong those who said he only played for his own statistics. He also scored a game-high 27 points and, at one point, fell on his right hand, and was thought to have sprained it, but it was broken.

For Game 5, Chamberlain's hands were packed into thick pads that were normally used by defensive linemen in football; he was offered a painkilling shot but refused for fear he would lose his shooting touch if his hands became numb. Chamberlain recorded 24 points, 29 rebounds, 8 assists, and 8 blocked shots; announcer Keith Jackson counted the blocks during the broadcast. Chamberlain's all-around performance helped the Lakers win their first championship in Los Angeles with a decisive 114–100 win. Chamberlain was named the Finals MVP, and admired for playing while injured.

==== 1972–73 NBA season: second NBA finals loss to the Knicks ====
The 1972–73 NBA season was Chamberlain's last; the Lakers lost substance—Happy Hairston was injured, Robinson and LeRoy Ellis had left, and West struggled with injury. Chamberlain averaged 13.2 points and 18.6 rebounds to win the rebounding title for the 11th time in his career. He also shot an NBA record 0.727 for the season, bettering his own mark of 0.683 from the 1966–67 season. It was the ninth time Chamberlain led the league in field-goal percentage. The Lakers won 60 games in the regular season and reached the NBA Finals against the New York Knicks, a franchise that had a healthy team with a rejuvenated Reed whereas the Lakers were handicapped by several injuries. In that series, the Lakers began with a 115–112 win but the Knicks won Games 2 and 3; and West again injured his hamstring. In Game 4, the shorthanded Lakers were defeated by the Knicks. In Game 5, the valiant-but-injured West and Hairston had bad games, and the Lakers lost the game 102–93 and the series 4–1 despite Chamberlain scoring 23 points and grabbing 21 rebounds. After the Knicks finished the game with a late flourish led by Phil Jackson and Earl Monroe, Chamberlain made a dunk with one second left, which was the last play of his NBA career.

== Coaching career ==
=== San Diego Conquistadors (1973–1974) ===
In 1973, the San Diego Conquistadors, a member of the NBA-rival league ABA, signed Chamberlain as a player-coach for a $600,000 salary. According to Chamberlain, part of the reason for leaving the Lakers was his belief he had the right to renegotiate his contract after winning the 1971–72 NBA championship, and was upset the Lakers did not contact him until September 1972, before which they were trying to acquire UCLA star-center Bill Walton, who ultimately decided to return to school for the 1972–73 season. The Lakers sued Chamberlain and prevented him from playing for the Conquistadors because he still owed the Lakers the option year of his contract. According to the two-year contract Chamberlain had signed prior to the 1971–72 season, if he failed to sign and mail back his next contract, his contract with the Lakers would be deemed to be renewed. The Lakers said they mailed Chamberlain a new contract in July 1973, but Chamberlain did not sign it, so the old contract should be deemed to have been renewed for the 1973–74 season. On October 10, 1973, the opening day of the Conquistadors' season, a judge ruled Chamberlain could coach the Conquistadors but could not play for any team other than the Lakers for 1973–74.

While he was barred from playing, Chamberlain mostly left coaching duties to his assistant Stan Albeck, who said Chamberlain "has a great feel for pro basketball ... the day-to-day things that are an important part of basketball ... just bored him. He did not have the patience." The players were split on Chamberlain, who was seen as competent but often indifferent, and was more occupied with promotion of his autobiography Wilt: Just Like Any Other 7-Foot Black Millionaire Who Lives Next Door, than with coaching. He once skipped a game to sign autographs for the book. In his single season as a coach, the Conquistadors finished 37–47 in the regular season and lost against the Utah Stars in the division semifinals. After the season, Chamberlain retired from professional basketball; he was displeased by the meager attendance as crowds averaged 1,843, occupying just over half of the team's 3,200-seat Golden Hall sports arena.

== Career statistics ==
Legend
GP	Games played	GS	Games started	MPG	Minutes per game
FG%	Field goal percentage	3P%	3-point field goal percentage	FT%	Free throw percentage
RPG	Rebounds per game	APG	Assists per game	SPG	Steals per game
BPG	Blocks per game	PPG	Points per game	**Bold**	Career high
†	Won an NBA championship	*	Led the league	‡	NBA record

=== NBA ===
==== Regular season ====
Year	Team(s)	GP	MPG	FG%	FT%	RPG	APG	PPG
1959–60	Philadelphia	72	46.4*	.461	.582	27.0*	2.3	37.6*
1960–61	Philadelphia	79*	47.8*	.509*	.504	**27.2**‡	1.9	38.4*
1961–62	Philadelphia	80*	**48.5**‡	.506	**.613**	25.7*	2.4	**50.4**‡
1962–63	San Francisco	80*	47.6*	.528*	.593	24.3*	3.4	44.8*
1963–64	San Francisco	80	46.1*	.524	.531	22.3	5.0	36.9*
1964–65	San Francisco	38	45.9	.499*	.416	23.5	3.1	38.9*
1964–65	Philadelphia	35	44.5	.528*	.526	22.3	3.8	30.1*
1965–66	Philadelphia	79	47.3*	.540*	.513	24.6*	5.2	33.5*
1966–67†	Philadelphia	81*	45.5*	.683*	.441	24.2*	7.8	24.1
1967–68	Philadelphia	**82**	46.8*	.595*	.380	23.8*	**8.6**	24.3
1968–69	L.A. Lakers	81	45.3*	.583*	.446	21.1*	4.5	20.5
1969–70	L.A. Lakers	12	42.1	.568	.446	18.4	4.1	27.3
1970–71	L.A. Lakers	**82**	44.3	.545	.538	18.2*	4.3	20.7
1971–72†	L.A. Lakers	**82**	42.3	.649*	.422	19.2*	4.0	14.8
1972–73	L.A. Lakers	**82***	43.2	**.727***	.510	18.6*	4.5	13.2
Career		1,045	45.8‡	.540	.511	22.9‡	4.4	30.1
All-Star		13	29.8	.590	.500	15.1	2.7	14.6

==== Playoffs ====
Year	Team(s)	GP	MPG	FG%	FT%	RPG	APG	PPG
1960	Philadelphia	9	46.1	.496	.445	25.8	2.1	33.2
1961	Philadelphia	3	48.0	.489	.553	23.0	2.0	**37.0**
1962	Philadelphia	12	48.0	.467	**.636**	26.6	3.1	35.0
1964	San Francisco	12	46.5	.543	.475	25.2	3.3	34.7
1965	Philadelphia	11	**48.7**	.530	.559	27.2	4.4	29.3
1966	Philadelphia	5	48.0	.509	.412	**30.2**	3.0	28.0
1967†	Philadelphia	15	47.9	**.579**	.388	29.1	**9.0**	21.7
1968	Philadelphia	13	48.5	.534	.380	24.7	6.5	23.7
1969	L.A. Lakers	**18**	46.2	.545	.392	24.7	2.6	13.9
1970	L.A. Lakers	**18**	47.3	.549	.406	22.2	4.5	22.1
1971	L.A. Lakers	12	46.2	.455	.515	20.2	4.4	18.3
1972†	L.A. Lakers	15	46.9	.563	.492	21.0	3.3	14.7
1973	L.A. Lakers	17	47.1	.552	.500	22.5	3.5	10.4
Career		160	47.2‡	.522	.465	24.5	4.2	22.5

== Head coaching record ==
=== ABA ===
Legend
Regular season	G	Games coached	W	Games won	L	Games lost	W–L %	Win–loss %
Playoffs	PG	Playoff games	PW	Playoff wins	PL	Playoff losses	PW–L %	Playoff win–loss %

Team	Year	G	W	L	W–L%	Finish	PG	PW	PL	PW–L%	Result
San Diego	1973–74	84	37	47	.440	4th in Western	6	2	4	.333	Lost in division semifinals

== Post-NBA career ==
After his stint with the Conquistadors, Chamberlain went into business and entertainment, made money in stocks and real estate, bought a popular Harlem nightclub which he renamed Big Wilt's Smalls Paradise, and invested in broodmares. He appeared in advertisements for TWA, American Express, Volkswagen, Drexel Burnham, Le Tigre Clothing, Foot Locker, and Lite beer from Miller.

=== Athletics ===
Chamberlain sponsored his own professional volleyball and track and field teams, and provided high-level teams for girls and women in basketball, track, volleyball, and softball.

Volleyball became Chamberlain's new athletic passion, having been a talented hobby volleyballer during his Lakers days. He became a board member of the newly founded International Volleyball Association (IVA) in 1974 and became its president in 1975. As a testament to his importance, the IVA All-Star game was televised only because Chamberlain also played in it; he was named the game's MVP. Chamberlain played occasional matches for IVA Seattle Smashers before the league folded in 1979. Chamberlain promoted the sport so effectively he was named to the IVA Hall of Fame and became one of the few athletes who were enshrined in multiple sports. In 2008, Chamberlain was also enshrined in the Beach Volleyball Hall of Fame.

In the 1970s, Chamberlain formed Wilt's Athletic Club, a track-and-field club in southern California that was coached by UCLA assistant coach Bob Kersee in the early part of his career. The team included Florence Griffith before she set the world records in the 100 meters and 200 meters; three-time world champion Greg Foster; and future Olympic Gold medalists Andre Phillips, Alice Brown, and Jeanette Bolden. Chamberlain signed 60 athletes and planned to expand to 100. While actively promoting the sport in 1982, Chamberlain said he was considering a return to athletic competition in masters athletics; he stated he had only once been beaten in the high jump by Olympic champion Charles Dumas, and that he had never been beaten in shot put, beating Olympic discus champion Al Oerter.

Following his playing days, Chamberlain maintained his high level of fitness. In his mid-forties, he was able to humble rookie Magic Johnson in practice, and he planned a return to the NBA in the 1980s. In the 1980–81 NBA season, coach Larry Brown said the 45-year-old Chamberlain had received an offer from the Cleveland Cavaliers. When Chamberlain was 50, the New Jersey Nets made Chamberlain an offer, which he declined. He continued to maintain his physical fitness for several years, participating in several marathons. When million-dollar contracts became common in the NBA, Chamberlain increasingly felt he had been underpaid during his career. A result of this resentment was the 1997 book Who's Running the Asylum? Inside the Insane World of Sports Today, in which he criticized the NBA for being too disrespectful of former players.

=== Film ===
In 1976, Chamberlain, who was interested in movies, forming a film production and distribution company to make his first film, which was entitled Go For It. Chamberlain played a villainous warrior and counterpart of Arnold Schwarzenegger in the 1984 film Conan the Destroyer, including fight scenes against Schwarzenegger and Grace Jones. It remained his only credited film role.

In November 1998, he signed with Ian Ng Cheng Hin, CEO of Northern Cinema House Entertainment, to produce his own bio-pic, wanting to tell his life story his way. He had been working on the screenplay notes for over a year at the time of his death.

== Death ==
Chamberlain, who had a history of cardiovascular disease, was briefly hospitalized for an irregular heartbeat in 1992. According to those close to him, he began taking medication for his heart problems. His condition rapidly deteriorated in 1999, and he lost fifty pounds (23 kg). After undergoing dental surgery in the week before his death, he was in great pain and seemed unable to recover from the stress. On October 12, 1999, Chamberlain died at age 63 at his home in Bel Air. His longtime attorney, Sy Goldberg, stated Chamberlain died of congestive heart failure. Goldberg said:

He was more inquisitive than anybody I ever knew. He was writing a screenplay about his life. He was interested in world affairs, sometimes he'd call me up late at night and discuss philosophy. I think he'll be remembered as a great man. He happened to make a living playing basketball, but he was more than that. He could talk on any subject. He was a Goliath.

A memorial service for Chamberlain was held at the City of Angels Church of Religious Science in Los Angeles on October 16, 1999. A second memorial service was held at his home church, Mount Carmel Baptist Church, in Philadelphia on October 21, 1999.

Several NBA players and officials remembered him as one of the greatest players in the history of basketball. On-court rival and personal friend Bill Russell stated: "the fierceness of our competition bonded us together for eternity".

== Legacy ==
=== Awards and honors ===
Chamberlain is regarded as one of the most extraordinary and dominant basketball players in NBA history, and has been called the greatest basketball player of all time by many sources including Basketball Hall of Fame members Walt Frazier and Earl Monroe. In 2007, ESPN ranked Chamberlain the second-best center of all time behind Kareem Abdul-Jabbar, and was ranked second in Slam's "Top 50 NBA Players of All-Time in NBA History" in 2009, and sixth in ESPN's list of the top 74 NBA players of all time in 2020, and the third-best center of all-time behind Abdul-Jabbar and Bill Russell. In 2022, Chamberlain was ranked fifth in ESPN's list of the NBA 75th Anniversary Team, and sixth in a similar list by The Athletic. Contemporaneous colleagues were often terrified of playing against Chamberlain. Russell regularly feared being embarrassed by Chamberlain, and Walt Frazier called his dominance on the court "comical".

Chamberlain holds numerous official NBA all-time records. Former teammate Billy Cunningham said, "The NBA Guide reads like Wilt's personal diary." He was a scoring champion, all-time top rebounder, and accurate field-goal shooter. He led the NBA in scoring seven times, field-goal percentage nine times, minutes played eight times, rebounding eleven times, and assists once. Chamberlain is most remembered for his 100-point game, which is widely considered one of basketball's greatest records. Decades after his record, many NBA teams did not average 100 points. (Note: The closest any player has gotten to 100 points was the Lakers' Kobe Bryant, who scored 81 in 2006. Afterward, Bryant said Chamberlain's record was "unthinkable ... It's pretty exhausting to think about it".)

In high school and college, Chamberlain was Mr. Basketball USA, NCAA Tournament Most Outstanding Player in 1957, and twice consensus first-team All-American in 1957 and 1958. His number 13 jersey was retired by the Kansas Jayhawks, Harlem Globetrotters, Golden State Warriors, Philadelphia 76ers, and Los Angeles Lakers. Chamberlain won two NBA championships, four regular-season Most Valuable Player (MVP) awards, the Rookie of the Year award, one Finals MVP award, and one All-Star Game MVP award, and was selected to 13 All-Star Games and 10 All-NBA Teams—seven First and three Second teams. He also twice made All-Defensive First Team. For his feats, Chamberlain was enshrined in the Naismith Memorial Basketball Hall of Fame in 1978, named part of the NBA 35th Anniversary Team in 1980, one of the 50 Greatest Players in NBA History in 1996, and was ranked 13th in ESPN's list "Top North American Athletes of the Century" in 1999.

During his NBA career, Chamberlain committed few fouls despite his rugged play in the post, and he never fouled out of a regular-season or playoff game in his 14-year NBA career. His career average was two fouls per game despite having averaged 45.8 minutes per game over his career. He had five seasons in which he committed fewer than two fouls per game, and a career-low of 1.5 fouls during the 1962 season, in which he also averaged 50.4 points per game. His fouls per 36 minutes—a statistic that is used to compare players who average vastly different minutes—was 1.6 per game.

Chamberlain's game evolved during his playing career. Chamberlain's Lakers coach Bill Sharman said, "First he was a scorer. Then he was a rebounder and assist man. Then with our great Laker team in 1972, he concentrated on the defensive end." During his two-championship seasons, Chamberlain led the league in rebounding while his scoring decreased. During his first championship season, his assists also increased, recording two consecutive seasons with eight assists per game, and winning one assist title. By 1971–72, at age 35 and running less, his game was averaging only nine shots per game compared to the 40 in his record-setting 1961–62 season. During Chamberlain's time, defensive statistics like blocks and steals had not yet been recorded. According to 1960s Sixers general manager Jack Ramsay, "Harvey [Pollack] said he used to tell one of his statisticians to keep track of Wilt's blocks in big games ... One night, they got up to 25". Reported data for 112 games played by Chamberlain for the Lakers in the 1970s shows he averaged 8.8 blocks per game.

=== Rule changes ===
Part of Chamberlain's impact on basketball is his direct responsibility for several rule changes in the NBA, including a widening of the lane to try to keep big men more distant from the basket, the instituting of offensive goaltending, a ban on dunking to convert free throws, and a revision of rules governing inbounding the ball, such as making it illegal to inbound the ball over the backboard. In basketball history, pundits have stated the only other player who forced such a massive change of rules is 6 ft 10 in (2.08 m) Minneapolis Lakers center George Mikan, who played a decade before Chamberlain and also caused many rule changes designed to thwart dominant centers, such as a widening the lane and defensive goaltending.

=== Chamberlain–Russell rivalry ===
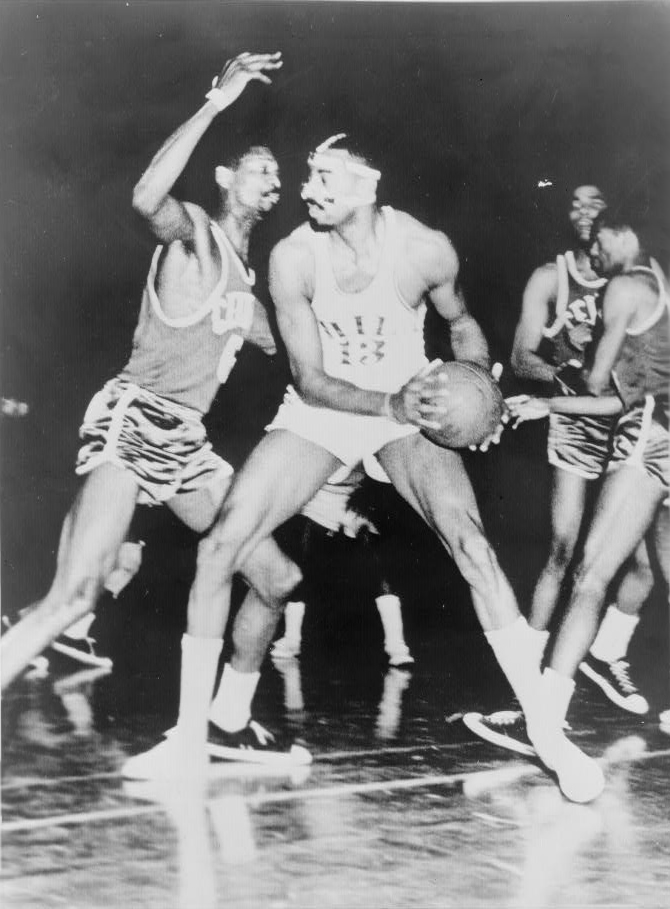
Chamberlain being defended by the Celtics' Bill Russell in 1966

The on-court rivalry between Chamberlain and Bill Russell is cited as one of the greatest of all time. (Note: While there were three NBA Finals matchups in the later Bird–Magic rivalry, Larry Bird and Magic Johnson played different positions and did not guard each other.) Russell won 11 NBA titles in his career while Chamberlain won two. Chamberlain was named All-NBA First Team seven times in comparison to Russell's three but Russell was named the NBA MVP—then selected by players—five times against Chamberlain's four. Russell's Celtics won seven of eight playoff series against Chamberlain's Warriors, 76ers, and Lakers teams, and went 57–37 against them in the regular season and 29–20 in the playoffs. Russell's teams won all four series-deciding seventh games against Chamberlain's by a combined margin of nine points.

The comparison between Chamberlain and Russell is often simplified to one between a great player (Chamberlain) with a player who makes his team great (Russell); an individualist against a team player. Chamberlain would say Boston did not rely on Russell's scoring, and that Russell could concentrate on defense and rebounding. Chamberlain went on: "I've got to hit forty points or so, or this team is in trouble. I must score—understand? After that I play defense and get the ball off the boards. I try to do them all, best I can, but scoring comes first." Chamberlain outscored Russell 30 to 14.2 and out-rebounded him 28.2 to 22.9 in the regular season, and he outscored Russell 25.7 to 14.9, and out-rebounded Russell 28 to 24.7 in the playoffs.

Russell and Chamberlain were friends in private life. Russell never considered Chamberlain his rival and disliked the term, preferring "competitors", and also said they rarely talked about basketball when they were alone. When Chamberlain died in 1999, Chamberlain's nephew stated Russell was the second person whom he was ordered to inform. While previously friends, after Russell criticized Chamberlain for his performance during Game 7 of the 1969 NBA Finals, the two men did not speak for two decades. Russell privately apologized to Chamberlain and later publicly apologized in a 1997 joint interview with Bob Costas. The 1969 NBA Finals is arguably the biggest stain on Chamberlain's career; supporters of Chamberlain said Russell won more games because he had better-skilled teammates, but that year Chamberlain's team was favored and lost.

=== Reputation as a loser ===
Although Chamberlain accumulated some of the most impressive statistics in the history of professional sports, some called him selfish and a loser because he won only two NBA championships and lost seven out of eight playoff series against Bill Russell's Celtics teams. Frank Deford of ESPN said Chamberlain was caught in a no-win situation: "If you win, everybody says, 'Well, look at him, he's that big'. If you lose, everybody says, 'How could he lose, a guy that size?' " Quoting coach Alex Hannum's explanation of his situation, Chamberlain often said: "Nobody roots for Goliath".

Rick Barry wrote:

I'll say what most players feel, which is that Wilt is a loser ... He is terrible in big games. He knows he is going to lose and be blamed for the loss, so he dreads it, and you can see it in his eyes; and anyone who has ever played with him will agree with me, regardless of whether they would admit it publicly ... When it comes down to the closing minutes of a tough game, an important game, he doesn't want the ball, he doesn't want any part of the pressure. It is at these times that greatness is determined and Wilt doesn't have it. There is no way you can compare him to a pro like a Bill Russell or a Jerry West ... these are clutch competitors.

However, Barry would later apologize for those comments, saying, "I was wrong [...] if you had to analyze all of the centers who have played before, as far as basketball skills are concerned, there has never been anybody to accomplish what Wilt Chamberlain has accomplished [...] he just never had the personnel like Bill Russell had to go along with him, and I really regret saying that in my book."

Chamberlain's main weakness was his poor free-throw shooting, a .511 career average, the third-lowest in NBA history, with a low of .380 over the 1967–68 season. Chamberlain later said he was a "psycho case" in this matter. Much like later center Shaquille O'Neal, Chamberlain would be intentionally fouled and was a target of criticism because of it. Many suggestions were offered; he shot them underhanded, one-handed, two-handed, from the side of the circle, from well behind the line, and banked it in. Coach Hannum once suggested Chamberlain shoot his fadeaway jumper as a free throw but Chamberlain feared drawing more attention to his main failing.

Despite his foul-line problems, Chamberlain set the NBA record, later equaled by Adrian Dantley, for the most free throws made in a regular season game (28) by using the underhand technique during his 1962 100-point game. Chamberlain later said he was too embarrassed by the underhand technique to continue using it, despite it consistently giving him better results. Chamberlain stated he intentionally missed free throws so a teammate could get the rebound and score two points instead of one. On March 10, 2026, 64 years and eight days after Chamberlain's 100-point game with 28 free throws made, Bam Adebayo broke the free throw record, making 36 as part of his 83 points scored against the Washington Wizards.

== Personal life ==
=== Star status ===
Chamberlain was the first big earner of basketball; upon entering the NBA, he immediately became the highest-paid player. Chamberlain was basketball's first player to earn at least $100,000 a year; and he earned an unprecedented $1.5 million during his Lakers years. (Note: The American philosopher Robert Nozick in his book Anarchy State and Utopia has the "Wilt Chamberlain argument" arguing against some egalitarian distribution of resources. Nozick has the intuition Chamberlain received his money legitimately.) As a Philadelphia 76er, he could afford to rent a New York apartment and commute to Philadelphia. He would often stay out late into the night and wake up at noon.

Jazz composer Thad Jones named the music composition "Big Dipper" after Chamberlain. When he became a Laker, Chamberlain built a million-dollar mansion in Bel-Air and named it after Ursa Major, a play on his nickname "The Big Dipper". It had a 2,200-pound (1,000 kg) pivot as a front door and contained great displays of luxury. Cherry described Chamberlain's house as a miniature Playboy Mansion, where he regularly held parties and lived his later-notorious sex life. This was also helped by the fact Chamberlain was a near-insomniac who often skipped sleep. The house was designed according to Chamberlain's preferences; it had no right angles, and had an X-rated room with mirrored walls and a fur-covered waterbed. Chamberlain lived alone, relying on many automated gadgets, with two cats named Zip and Zap, and several Great Dane dogs. Chamberlain drove a Ferrari, a Bentley, and a Le Mans-style car called Searcher One that was designed and built at a cost of $750,000 in 1996.

Following his death in 1999, Chamberlain's estate was valued at $25 million.

=== Love life ===
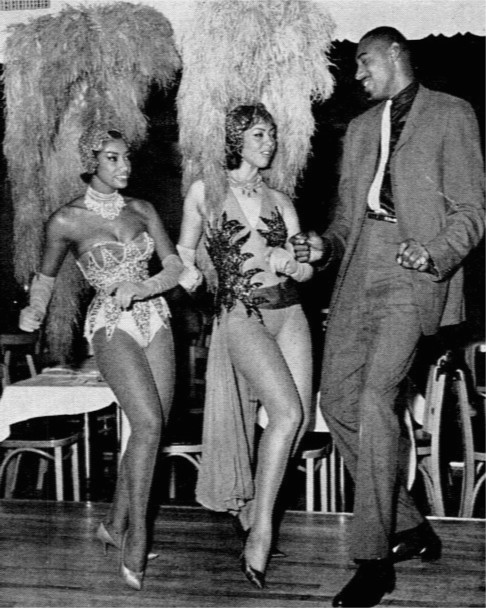
Chamberlain doing the twist with two dancers at Smalls Paradise in Harlem, New York

Although Chamberlain was shy and insecure as a teenager, he later became known for his womanizing. According to his lawyer Seymour Goldberg, "Some people collect stamps, Wilt collected women". Swedish Olympic high jumper Annette Tånnander, who met Chamberlain when he was 40 and she was 19, said he was a pick-up artist who was extremely confident yet respectful, saying: "I think Wilt hit on everything that moved ... he never was bad or rude". Los Angeles Times columnist David Shaw said Chamberlain was "rude and sexist toward his own date, as he usually was" during a dinner with Shaw and his wife; he added at one point Chamberlain left the table to get the telephone number of an attractive woman at a nearby table.

In Chamberlain's second book A View from Above, he claimed to have had sex with 20,000 women. According to his contemporary Rod Roddewig, Chamberlain documented his love life using a Day-Timer. Every time Chamberlain had sex with a different woman, he put a check in his Day-Timer. Over a ten-day period, there were 23 checks in the book. Chamberlain halved that number to be conservative and to correct for degrees of variation. He then multiplied that number by the number of days he had been alive and subtracted 15 years, giving him the 20,000 number.

In response to public backlash regarding his promiscuity, Chamberlain later said: "the point of using the number was to show that sex was a great part of my life as basketball was a great part of my life. That's the reason why I was single." In a 1999 interview shortly before his death, Chamberlain regretted not having explained the sexual climate at the time of his promiscuity and warned other men who admired him for it, saying: "With all of you men out there who think that having a thousand different ladies is pretty cool, I have learned in my life I've found out that having one woman a thousand different times is much more satisfying". Chamberlain also said he never came close to marrying and had no intention of raising any children.

In 2015, a man named Aaron Levi claimed to be Chamberlain's son based on non-identifying papers from his adoption and information from his biological mother. Chamberlain's sister refused to provide DNA evidence for testing, so Levi's claim has not been conclusively proved.

=== Relationships ===
According to Cherry, although Chamberlain was an egotist, he had good relationships with many of his contemporaries and enjoyed a great deal of respect. He was lauded for his good rapport with his fans, often providing tickets and signing autographs. Jack Ramsay said Chamberlain regularly took walks in downtown Philadelphia and acknowledged honking horns with the air of a man enjoying the attention. Jerry West called Chamberlain a "complex ... very nice person", and NBA rival Jack McMahon said: "The best thing that happened to the NBA is that God made Wilt a nice person ... he could have killed us all with his left hand". Celtics contemporary Bob Cousy assumed if Chamberlain had been less fixated on being popular, he would have been meaner and able to win more titles.

During most of his NBA career, Chamberlain was good friends with Bill Russell; he often invited Russell over to Thanksgiving and visited Russell's home, where conversation mostly concerned Russell's electric trains. As the championship count became increasingly lopsided, the relationship deteriorated and became hostile after Russell accused Chamberlain of "copping out" in Game 7 of the 1969 NBA Finals. The two reconciled after two decades but Chamberlain maintained a level of bitterness, regretted he had not been "more physical" with Russell in their games, and privately continued accusing his rival of negatively intellectualizing basketball.

Chamberlain's relationship with fellow center Kareem Abdul-Jabbar, eleven years his junior, was hostile. Although Abdul-Jabbar idolized Chamberlain as a teenager and was once part of his inner circle, the student–mentor bond deteriorated into intense mutual loathing, especially after Chamberlain retired. Chamberlain often criticized Abdul-Jabbar for a perceived lack of scoring, rebounding, and defense. Abdul-Jabbar accused Chamberlain of being a traitor to the black race for his Republican politics, and relationships with white women. When Abdul-Jabbar broke Chamberlain's all-time scoring record in 1984, Chamberlain criticized Abdul-Jabbar's game and called on him to retire. When Abdul-Jabbar published his autobiography in 1990, he wrote a paper titled "To Wilt Chumperlame", in which he stated: "Now that I am done playing, history will remember me as someone who helped teammates to win, while you will be remembered as a crybaby, a loser, and a quitter". Their relationship remained mostly strained until Chamberlain's death.

=== Politics ===
Chamberlain denounced the Black Panthers Party and other black nationalist movements in the late 1960s, and he supported Republican Richard Nixon in the 1968 and 1972 presidential elections. Chamberlain accompanied Nixon to the funeral of Martin Luther King Jr. and considered himself a Republican.

=== Sexual assault allegation ===
In 2021, actress Cassandra Peterson, who is primarily known for her alter ego Elvira, Mistress of the Dark, wrote in her memoir, Yours Cruelly, Elvira: Memoirs of the Mistress of the Dark, that Chamberlain had sexually assaulted her during a party at his mansion in the 1970s. Chamberlain allegedly forced Peterson to perform oral sex after offering to show her a closet containing his NBA jerseys. Peterson stated she had blamed herself and was almost "convinced that I was a very bad person for letting that happen" until the Me Too movement made her reconsider the experience. Peterson felt the assault was "creepier" because Chamberlain had been a friend.

== See also ==
- List of basketball players who have scored 100 points in a single game
- List of NBA annual field goal percentage leaders
- List of NBA annual minutes leaders
- List of NBA annual rebounding leaders
- List of NBA career field goal percentage leaders
- List of NBA career free throw scoring leaders
- List of NBA career minutes played leaders
- List of NBA career triple-double leaders
- List of NBA career playoff free throw scoring leaders
- List of NBA career playoff rebounding leaders
- List of NBA career playoff scoring leaders
- List of NBA career playoff triple-double leaders
- List of NBA career rebounding leaders
- List of NBA career scoring leaders
- List of NBA franchise career scoring leaders
- List of NBA longest winning streaks
- List of NBA rookie single-season scoring leaders
- List of NBA single-game playoff scoring leaders
- List of NBA single-game rebounding leaders
- List of NBA single-game scoring leaders
- List of NBA single-season rebounding leaders
- List of NBA single-season scoring leaders
- List of NCAA Division I men's basketball players with 30 or more rebounds in a game

== Works cited ==
- Chamberlain, Wilt (1992). A View From Above. New York: New York Signet Books. ISBN 0-451-17493-3.
- Chamberlain, Wilt (1997). Who's Running the Asylum? Inside the Insane World of Sports Today. Los Angeles: International Promotions. ISBN 1-57901-005-9.
- Cherry, Robert (2004). Wilt: Larger than Life. Chicago: Triumph Books. ISBN 1-57243-672-7.
- Pluto, Terry (1992). Tall Tales: The Glory Years of the NBA in the Words of the Men Who Played, Coached, and Built Pro Basketball. New York: Simon & Schuster. ISBN 0-671-74279-5.
- Pomerantz, Gary M. (2005). Wilt, 1962: The Night of 100 Points and the Dawn of a New Era. New York: Crown. ISBN 1-4000-5160-6.
- Taylor, John (2005). The Rivalry: Bill Russell, Wilt Chamberlain, and the Golden Age of Basketball. New York: Random House. ISBN 1-4000-6114-8.

Sporting positions
Preceded by K. C. Jones	San Diego Conquistadors Head Coach; 1973–1974	Succeeded by Alex Groza
