= Roy Wilt =

American politician

Roy W. Wilt

Member of the Pennsylvania Senate from the 50th district
- In office April 21, 1981 – November 30, 1990
- Preceded by: R. Budd Dwyer
- Succeeded by: Robert D. Robbins
- Constituency: Parts of Mercer County, Crawford, and Venango Counties

Member of the Pennsylvania House of Representatives from the 8th district
- In office January 7, 1969 – April 21, 1981
- Preceded by: District Created
- Succeeded by: Howard Fargo

Personal details
- Born: July 4, 1935 (age 91) Pittsburgh, Pennsylvania, U.S.
- Party: Republican
- Education: Thiel College

Roy William Wilt (born July 4, 1935) is a former Republican member of the Pennsylvania State Senate and the Pennsylvania House of Representatives.

He earned a degree from Thiel College in 1959.

He was first elected to represent the 8th legislative district in the Pennsylvania House of Representatives in 1969. He was elected to represent the 50th senatorial district in the Pennsylvania State Senate in a special election on March 31, 1981 that wes held after R. Budd Dwyer resigned to become Treasurer of Pennsylvania. He held that position until 1990.
