= Sacramento Kings all-time roster =

The Sacramento Kings is an American professional basketball team based in Sacramento, California. They play in the Pacific Division of the Western Conference in the National Basketball Association (NBA). They began as the Rochester Royals (based in Rochester, New York) in the Basketball Association of America (forerunner of the NBA) in 1948. The Royals moved to Cincinnati, Ohio in 1957. In 1972, the team moved again, to a primary home in Kansas City, Missouri (and a secondary home in Omaha, Nebraska) and were renamed as the Kansas City-Omaha Kings. The Kings moved to its current home in Sacramento, California in 1985.

This article is a list of players, both past and present, who have appeared at least in one game.

== Players ==
Note: Statistics are correct through the end of the 2025–26 season.

G	Guard	G/F	Guard-forward	F	Forward	F/C	Forward-center	C	Center

legend
^	Denotes player who has been inducted to the Naismith Memorial Basketball Hall of Fame
*	Denotes player who has been selected for at least one All-Star Game with the Sacramento Kings and is currently on the team roster
^{+}	Denotes player who has been selected for at least one All-Star Game with the Sacramento Kings
^{x}	Denotes player who is currently on the Sacramento Kings roster
0.0	Denotes the Sacramento Kings statistics leader (min. 100 games played for the team for per-game statistics)

=== A ===
All-time roster
Player	Pos.	Pre-draft team	Yrs	Seasons	Statistics									Ref.
Player	Pos.	Pre-draft team	Yrs	Seasons	GP	MP	REB	AST	PTS	MPG	RPG	APG	PPG	Ref.
Alaa Abdelnaby	F	Duke	1	1994–1995	51	476	106	13	254	9.3	2.1	0.3	5.0	
Zaid Abdul-Aziz	F/C	Iowa State	1	1968–1969	20	108	31	4	38	5.4	1.6	0.2	1.9	
Mahmoud Abdul-Rauf	G	LSU	2	1996–1998	106	2,661	159	247	1,258	25.1	1.5	2.3	11.9	
Tariq Abdul-Wahad	F	San Jose State	2	1997–1999	108	2,164	302	101	830	20.0	2.8	0.9	7.7	
Shareef Abdur-Rahim	F	California	3	2005–2008	158	4,027	765	262	1,690	25.5	4.8	1.7	10.7	
Precious Achiuwa^{x}	F/C	Memphis	1	2025–2026	73	1,745	492	101	736	23.9	6.7	1.4	10.1	
Quincy Acy	F	Baylor	2	2013–2014; 2015–2016	115	1,662	389	51	459	14.5	3.4	0.4	4.0	
Michael Adams	G	Boston College	1	1985–1986	18	139	6	22	40	7.7	0.3	1.2	2.2	
Rick Adelman	G	Loyola Marymount	1	1974–1975	18	121	14	8	30	6.7	0.8	0.4	1.7	
Arron Afflalo	G	UCLA	1	2016–2017	61	1,580	125	78	515	25.9	2.0	1.3	8.4	
Danny Ainge	G	BYU	2	1988–1990	103	3,755	427	640	1,909	36.5	4.1	6.2	18.5	
Cole Aldrich	C	Kansas	1	2012–2013	15	175	63	3	50	11.7	4.2	0.2	3.3	
Lucius Allen	G	UCLA	2	1977–1979	108	2,560	275	404	1,077	23.7	2.5	3.7	10.0	
Randy Allen	F	Florida State	2	1988–1990	70	789	145	23	252	11.3	2.1	0.3	3.6	
Peter Aluma	C	Liberty	1	1998–1999	2	5	2	0	2	2.5	1.0	0.0	1.0	
James Anderson	G/F	Oklahoma State	1	2015–2016	51	721	86	41	179	14.1	1.7	0.8	3.5	
Nick Anderson	G	Illinois	2	1999–2001	93	2,263	364	136	819	24.3	3.9	1.5	8.8	
Wally Anderzunas	F	Creighton	1	1969–1970	44	370	82	9	159	8.4	1.9	0.2	3.6	
Nate Archibald^ (#1)	G	UTEP	6	1970–1976	433	17,520	1,207	3,499	10,894	40.5	2.8	8.1	25.2	
Trevor Ariza	F	UCLA	1	2019–2020	32	791	146	50	192	24.7	4.6	1.6	6.0	
Joe Arlauckas	F	Niagara	1	1987–1988	9	85	13	8	34	9.4	1.4	0.9	3.8	
Hilton Armstrong	F/C	UConn	1	2009–2010	6	56	14	2	10	9.3	2.3	0.3	1.7	
Jay Arnette	G	Texas	3	1963–1966	114	1,177	116	139	424	10.3	1.0	1.2	3.7	
Bob Arnzen	F	Notre Dame	1	1970–1971	55	594	152	24	301	10.8	2.8	0.4	5.5	
Ron Artest	F	St. John's	3	2005–2008	167	6,417	990	602	3,158	38.4	5.9	3.6	18.9	
Vincent Askew	G	Memphis	1	1992–1993	9	76	11	5	27	8.4	1.2	0.6	3.0	

=== B ===
All-time roster
Player	Pos.	Pre-draft team	Yrs	Seasons	Statistics									Ref.
Player	Pos.	Pre-draft team	Yrs	Seasons	GP	MP	REB	AST	PTS	MPG	RPG	APG	PPG	Ref.
Marvin Bagley III	F	Duke	4	2018–2022	148	3,676	1,101	132	1,994	24.8	7.4	0.9	13.5	
Patrick Baldwin Jr.^{x}	F	Milwaukee	1	2025–2026	6	88	21	5	23	14.7	3.5	0.8	3.8	
Harrison Barnes	F	North Carolina	6	2018–2024	399	13,156	1,941	826	5,873	33.0	4.9	2.1	14.7	
Matt Barnes	F	UCLA	2	2004–2005; 2016–2017	97	2,082	426	207	577	21.5	4.4	2.1	5.9	
Mike Barr	G	Duquesne	1	1976–1977	73	1,224	130	175	285	16.8	1.8	2.4	3.9	
Moe Barr	G	Duquesne	1	1970–1971	31	145	20	28	61	4.7	0.6	0.9	2.0	
Jon Barry	G	Georgia Tech	3	1998–2001	167	3,027	349	392	1,024	18.1	2.1	2.3	6.1	
Kent Bazemore	G/F	Old Dominion	1	2019–2020	25	577	122	32	257	23.1	4.9	1.3	10.3	
Ron Behagen	F/C	Minnesota	3	1973–1975; 1978–1979	170	4,390	1,190	292	1,795	25.8	7.0	1.7	10.6	
Marco Belinelli	G/F	(Italy) Fortitudo Bologna	1	2015–2016	68	1,672	117	127	696	24.6	1.7	1.9	10.2	
Ricky Berry	F	San Jose State	1	1988–1989	64	1,406	197	80	706	22.0	3.1	1.3	11.0	
Sim Bhullar	C	New Mexico State	1	2014–2015	3	3	1	1	2	1.0	0.3	0.3	0.7	
Mike Bibby	G	Arizona	7	2001–2008	476	16,982	1,537	2,580	8,384	35.7	3.2	5.4	17.6	
Bob Bigelow	G/F	Penn	3	1975–1978	61	332	61	17	143	5.4	1.0	0.3	2.3	
Otis Birdsong^{+}	G	Houston	4	1977–1981	308	10,195	1,118	890	6,539	33.1	3.6	2.9	21.2	
Nemanja Bjelica	F	(Serbia) Crvena zvezda	3	2018–2021	175	4,238	1,002	399	1,759	24.2	5.7	2.3	10.1	
Tom Black	C	South Dakota State	1	1970–1971	16	100	34	2	26	6.3	2.1	0.1	1.6	
John Block	F	USC	2	1972–1974	107	2,260	509	113	938	21.1	4.8	1.1	8.8	
Bucky Bockhorn	G	Dayton	7	1958–1965	474	14,791	2,234	1,645	5,430	31.2	4.7	3.5	11.5	
Bogdan Bogdanović	G	(Serbia) Partizan	3	2017–2020	209	5,888	673	732	2,831	28.2	3.2	3.5	13.5	
Anthony Bonner	F	Saint Louis	3	1990–1993	183	4,801	1,101	270	1,591	26.2	6.0	1.5	8.7	
Ron Boone	G/F	Idaho State	2	1976–1978	164	5,674	590	649	3,266	34.6	3.6	4.0	19.9	
Calvin Booth	C	Penn State	1	2008–2009	7	55	10	0	16	7.9	1.4	0.0	2.3	
Bob Boozer	F	Kansas State	4	1960–1964	269	7,276	2,348	374	3,233	27.0	8.7	1.4	12.0	
Michael Bradley	F/C	Villanova	1	2004–2005	8	48	11	2	18	6.0	1.4	0.3	2.3	
Mike Bratz	G	Stanford	1	1985–1986	33	269	23	39	70	8.2	0.7	1.2	2.1	
Randy Breuer	C	Minnesota	1	1993–1994	26	247	56	8	19	9.5	2.2	0.3	0.7	
Corey Brewer	G/F	Florida	2	2018–2020	29	385	67	31	103	13.3	2.3	1.1	3.6	
Jon Brockman	F	Washington	1	2009–2010	52	654	213	22	147	12.6	4.1	0.4	2.8	
Price Brookfield	G/F	West Texas A&M	1	1949–1950	7			1	34			0.1	4.9	
Aaron Brooks	G	Oregon	1	2012–2013	46	959	78	108	366	20.8	1.7	2.3	8.0	
Bobby Brown	G	Cal State Fullerton	1	2008–2009	47	675	36	87	245	14.4	0.8	1.9	5.2	
Chucky Brown	F	NC State	1	2001–2002	18	92	33	6	21	5.1	1.8	0.3	1.2	
Randy Brown	G	New Mexico State	4	1991–1995	259	4,388	501	521	1,349	16.9	1.9	2.0	5.2	
Joe Buckhalter	F	Tennessee State	2	1961–1963	65	740	265	43	375	11.4	4.1	0.7	5.8	
Rodney Buford	G/F	Creighton	1	2003–2004	22	141	15	7	41	6.4	0.7	0.3	1.9	
Alec Burks	G	Colorado	1	2018–2019	13	127	22	10	22	9.8	1.7	0.8	1.7	
Tommy Burleson	C	NC State	3	1977–1980	169	2,724	835	201	1,183	16.1	4.9	1.2	7.0	
Evers Burns	F	Maryland	1	1993–1994	23	143	30	9	56	6.2	1.3	0.4	2.4	
Bob Burrow	C	Kentucky	1	1956–1957	67	1,028	293	41	404	15.3	4.4	0.6	6.0	
Deonte Burton	F	Iowa State	1	2022–2023	2	6	0	0	0	3.0	0.0	0.0	0.0	
Don Buse	G	Evansville	2	1983–1985	141	2,266	177	506	599	16.1	1.3	3.6	4.2	
Caron Butler	F	UConn	1	2015–2016	17	176	22	10	63	10.4	1.3	0.6	3.7	

=== C ===
All-time roster
Player	Pos.	Pre-draft team	Yrs	Seasons	Statistics									Ref.
Player	Pos.	Pre-draft team	Yrs	Seasons	GP	MP	REB	AST	PTS	MPG	RPG	APG	PPG	Ref.
Bruno Caboclo	F	(Brazil) Pinheiros	1	2017–2018	10	100	21	3	26	10.0	2.1	0.3	2.6	
Bill Calhoun	G/F	CC San Francisco	3	1948–1951	184		199	339	1,438		3.0	1.8	7.8	
Rick Calloway	F	Kansas	1	1990–1991	64	678	78	61	205	10.6	1.2	1.0	3.2	
Dylan Cardwell^{x}	C	Auburn	1	2025–2026	44	907	332	62	238	20.6	7.5	1.4	5.4	
Antoine Carr	F/C	Wichita State	2	1989–1991	110	3,451	593	257	2,165	31.4	5.4	2.3	19.7	
Devin Carter^{x}	G	Providence	2	2024–2026	74	1,096	201	142	477	14.8	2.7	1.9	6.4	
Vince Carter^	G/F	North Carolina	1	2017–2018	58	1,026	148	69	313	17.7	2.6	1.2	5.4	
Omri Casspi	F	(Israel) Maccabi Tel Aviv	5	2009–2011; 2014–2017	306	7,326	1,416	392	2,937	23.9	4.6	1.3	9.6	
Sid Catlett	F	Notre Dame	1	1971–1972	9	40	4	1	6	4.4	0.4	0.1	0.7	
Willie Cauley-Stein	F/C	Kentucky	4	2015–2019	295	7,090	1,879	483	2,971	24.0	6.4	1.6	10.1	
Duane Causwell	C	Temple	7	1990–1997	429	8,340	2,009	229	2,373	19.4	4.7	0.5	5.5	
Len Chappell	F/C	Wake Forest	2	1966–1968	64	594	166	26	261	9.3	2.6	0.4	4.1	
Pete Chilcutt	F	North Carolina	3	1991–1994	174	2,625	652	173	948	15.1	3.7	1.0	5.4	
Cal Christensen	F/C	Toledo	3	1952–1955	200	3,635	982	265	976	18.2	4.9	1.3	4.9	
Doug Christie	G	Pepperdine	5	2000–2005	355	12,223	1,523	1,505	3,773	34.4	4.3	4.2	10.6	
Keon Clark	F/C	UNLV	1	2002–2003	80	1,780	451	80	536	22.3	5.6	1.0	6.7	
Mateen Cleaves	G	Michigan State	2	2001–2003	44	208	16	35	86	4.7	0.4	0.8	2.0	
Nique Clifford^{x}	G	Colorado State	1	2025–2026	75	1,882	282	179	645	25.1	3.8	2.4	8.6	
Jack Coleman^{+}	F/C	Louisville	7	1949–1956	448	11,459	3,712	1,326	4,942	36.6	9.8	3.0	11.0	
Darren Collison	G	UCLA	3	2014–2017	187	5,847	464	882	2,660	31.3	2.5	4.7	14.2	
Steve Colter	G	New Mexico State	1	1990–1991	19	251	26	37	58	13.2	1.4	1.9	3.1	
Marty Conlon	C	Providence	1	1992–1993	46	467	123	37	219	10.2	2.7	0.8	4.8	
David Cooke	F	Saint Mary's	1	1985–1986	6	38	10	1	9	6.3	1.7	0.2	1.5	
Jack Cooley	F/C	Notre Dame	1	2017–2018	7	87	30	6	40	12.4	4.3	0.9	5.7	
Tyrone Corbin	F	DePaul	2	1995–1996; 1999–2000	103	1,871	344	121	531	18.2	3.3	1.2	5.2	
DeMarcus Cousins^{+}	C	Kentucky	7	2010–2017	470	14,996	5,056	1,402	9,894	31.9	10.8	3.0	21.1	
Bob Cousy^	G	Holy Cross	1	1969–1970	7	34	5	10	5	4.9	0.7	1.4	0.7	
Isaiah Crawford	F	Louisiana Tech	1	2024–2025	15	46	8	1	13	3.1	0.5	0.1	0.9	
Terry Crosby	G	Tennessee	1	1979–1980	4	28	1	7	6	7.0	0.3	1.8	1.5	
Pete Cross	F/C	San Francisco	1	1972–1973	3	24	4	0	0	8.0	1.3	0.0	0.0	
Jae Crowder	F	Marquette	1	2024–2025	9	103	20	6	23	11.4	2.2	0.7	2.6	
Jared Cunningham	G	Oregon State	1	2013–2014	8	58	5	5	24	7.3	0.6	0.6	3.0	
Fran Curran	G	Notre Dame	2	1948–1950	123			149	602			1.2	4.9	
Seth Curry	G	Duke	1	2015–2016	44	692	60	67	299	15.7	1.4	1.5	6.8	

=== D ===
All-time roster
Player	Pos.	Pre-draft team	Yrs	Seasons	Statistics									Ref.
Player	Pos.	Pre-draft team	Yrs	Seasons	GP	MP	REB	AST	PTS	MPG	RPG	APG	PPG	Ref.
Mike D'Antoni	G	Marshall	3	1973–1976	128	1,849	184	246	429	14.4	1.4	1.9	3.4	
Samuel Dalembert	C	Seton Hall	1	2010–2011	80	1,938	657	67	644	24.2	8.2	0.8	8.1	
Erik Daniels	F	Kentucky	1	2004–2005	21	72	18	4	13	3.4	0.9	0.2	0.6	
Lloyd Daniels	G	Mt. SAC	1	1996–1997	5	28	4	1	6	5.6	0.8	0.2	1.2	
Bob Davies^ (#11)	G	Seton Hall	7	1948–1955	462	8,617	980	2,250	6,594	31.3	2.9	4.9	14.3	
Ralph Davis	G	Cincinnati	1	1960–1961	73	1,210	86	177	396	16.6	1.2	2.4	5.4	
Red Davis	C	St. John's	1	1955–1956	3	16	4	1	2	5.3	1.3	0.3	0.7	
Terence Davis	G	Ole Miss	4	2020–2023; 2024–2025	122	1,966	322	154	1,041	16.1	2.6	1.3	8.5	
Tony Dawson	F	Florida State	1	1990–1991	4	17	2	0	9	4.3	0.5	0.0	2.3	
Dewayne Dedmon	C	USC	1	2019–2020	34	541	167	15	175	15.9	4.9	0.4	5.1	
Archie Dees	F/C	Indiana	1	1958–1959	68	1,252	339	56	559	18.4	5.0	0.8	8.2	
Terry Dehere	G	Seton Hall	2	1997–1999	81	1,430	108	197	498	17.7	1.3	2.4	6.1	
Vinny Del Negro	G	NC State	2	1988–1990	156	3,414	369	456	1,308	21.9	2.4	2.9	8.4	
Tony Delk	G	Kentucky	1	1999–2000	46	682	88	55	296	14.8	1.9	1.2	6.4	
Matthew Dellavedova	G	Saint Mary's	1	2022–2023	32	213	13	41	47	6.7	0.4	1.3	1.5	
Kenny Dennard	F	Duke	2	1981–1983	52	831	185	48	178	16.0	3.6	0.9	3.4	
DeMar DeRozan^{x}	F	USC	2	2024–2026	154	5,174	524	658	3,129	33.6	3.4	4.3	20.3	
Connie Dierking	C	Cincinnati	6	1965–1971	374	10,335	2,984	784	4,972	27.6	8.0	2.1	13.3	
Bill Dinwiddie	F	New Mexico Highlands	2	1967–1969	136	1,899	479	86	637	14.0	3.5	0.6	4.7	
Ike Diogu	F	Arizona State	1	2008–2009	10	142	39	3	92	14.2	3.9	0.3	9.2	
Vlade Divac^ (#21)	C	(Socialist Federal Republic of Yugoslavia) Partizan	6	1998–2004	454	13,676	3,538	1,693	5,176	30.1	7.8	3.7	11.4	
Donte DiVincenzo	G/F	Villanova	1	2021–2022	25	665	110	89	258	26.6	4.4	3.6	10.3	
Joey Dorsey	F	Memphis	1	2009–2010	8	52	18	0	12	6.5	2.3	0.0	1.5	
Quincy Douby	G	Rutgers	3	2006–2009	136	1,462	145	81	557	10.8	1.1	0.6	4.1	
Bruce Douglas	G	Illinois	1	1986–1987	8	98	14	17	14	12.3	1.8	2.1	1.8	
Leon Douglas	F/C	Alabama	3	1980–1983	147	2,495	681	104	648	17.0	4.6	0.7	4.4	
Toney Douglas	G	Florida State	1	2012–2013	22	376	48	58	135	17.1	2.2	2.6	6.1	
PJ Dozier	G/F	South Carolina	1	2022–2023	16	79	14	10	22	4.9	0.9	0.6	1.4	
Larry Drew	G	Missouri	5	1981–1986	376	11,370	791	2,409	5,543	30.2	2.1	6.4	14.7	
Chris Duarte	G	Oregon	1	2023–2024	59	719	106	44	230	12.2	1.8	0.7	3.9	
Dick Duckett	G	St. John's	1	1957–1958	34	424	56	47	132	12.5	1.6	1.4	3.9	
Duje Dukan	F	Wisconsin	1	2015–2016	1	24	4	1	6	24.0	4.0	1.0	6.0	
Andy Duncan	F/C	William & Mary	2	1948–1950	122			93	717			0.8	5.9	
Ken Durrett	F	La Salle	4	1971–1975	93	935	171	44	394	10.1	1.8	0.5	4.2	

=== E to F ===
All-time roster
Player	Pos.	Pre-draft team	Yrs	Seasons	Statistics									Ref.
Player	Pos.	Pre-draft team	Yrs	Seasons	GP	MP	REB	AST	PTS	MPG	RPG	APG	PPG	Ref.
Jim Eakins	C	BYU	1	1976–1977	82	1,338	361	119	490	16.3	4.4	1.5	6.0	
Jerry Eaves	G	Louisville	1	1986–1987	3	26	1	0	4	8.7	0.3	0.0	1.3	
Tyus Edney	G	UCLA	2	1995–1997	150	3,857	314	717	1,345	25.7	2.1	4.8	9.0	
Franklin Edwards	G	Cleveland State	2	1986–1988	24	536	29	121	160	22.3	1.2	5.0	6.7	
Kessler Edwards	F	Pepperdine	2	2022–2024	76	581	89	36	178	7.6	1.2	0.5	2.3	
Keon Ellis	G	Alabama	4	2022–2026	196	3,755	399	237	1,239	19.2	2.0	1.2	6.3	
Pervis Ellison	F/C	Louisville	1	1989–1990	34	866	196	65	271	25.5	5.8	1.9	8.0	
Len Elmore	F/C	Maryland	1	1979–1980	58	915	257	64	259	15.8	4.4	1.1	4.5	
Wayne Embry^	F/C	Miami (OH)	8	1958–1966	603	17,591	6,257	951	8,486	29.2	10.4	1.6	14.1	
Drew Eubanks^{x}	C	Oregon State	1	2025–2026	42	522	127	19	219	13.1	3.0	0.5	5.2	
Maurice Evans	G	Texas	1	2004–2005	65	1,233	201	45	416	19.0	3.1	0.7	6.4	
Reggie Evans	F	Iowa	2	2013–2015	71	1,264	484	48	309	17.8	6.8	0.7	4.4	
Tyreke Evans	G/F	Memphis	5	2009–2013; 2016–2017	271	9,276	1,282	1,278	4,649	34.2	4.7	4.7	17.2	
Jordan Farmar	G	UCLA	1	2016–2017	2	35	3	9	12	17.5	1.5	4.5	6.0	
Mike Farmer	F	San Francisco	1	1960–1961	57	1,295	378	81	429	22.7	6.6	1.4	7.5	
Yogi Ferrell	G	Indiana	2	2018–2020	121	1,597	158	206	638	13.2	1.3	1.7	5.3	
Bob Fitzgerald	F/C	Seton Hall	1	1948–1949	18			12	19			0.7	1.1	
Ed Fleming	G/F	Niagara	2	1955–1957	122	2,955	672	278	1,246	24.2	5.5	2.3	10.2	
Jordan Ford	G	Saint Mary's	1	2023–2024	6	22	2	2	12	3.7	0.3	0.3	2.0	
Phil Ford	G	North Carolina	4	1978–1982	299	9,583	587	2,322	4,454	32.1	2.0	7.8	14.9	
Fred Foster	F	Miami (OH)	3	1968–1971	131	2,595	375	143	1,296	19.8	2.9	1.1	9.9	
De'Aaron Fox^{+}	G	Kentucky	8	2017–2025	469	17,082	2,009	3,146	11,064	33.2	3.9	6.1	21.5	
Jim Fox	F/C	South Carolina	2	1967–1968; 1971–1972	102	2,291	754	92	975	22.5	7.4	0.9	9.6	
Anthony Frederick	F	Pepperdine	1	1990–1991	35	475	84	44	177	13.6	2.4	1.3	5.1	
Jimmer Fredette	G	BYU	3	2011–2014	171	2,565	189	261	1,197	15.0	1.1	1.5	7.0	
Pat Frink	G	Colorado	1	1968–1969	48	363	41	55	123	7.6	0.9	1.1	2.6	
Markelle Fultz	G	Washington	1	2024–2025	21	184	20	27	61	8.8	1.0	1.3	2.9	
Lawrence Funderburke	F	Ohio State	6	1997–2003	316	4,705	1,139	183	2,022	14.9	3.6	0.6	6.4	

=== G ===
All-time roster
Player	Pos.	Pre-draft team	Yrs	Seasons	Statistics									Ref.
Player	Pos.	Pre-draft team	Yrs	Seasons	GP	MP	REB	AST	PTS	MPG	RPG	APG	PPG	Ref.
Wenyen Gabriel	F/C	Kentucky	1	2019–2020	11	61	10	3	19	5.5	0.9	0.3	1.7	
Langston Galloway	G	Saint Joseph's	1	2016–2017	19	375	35	28	114	19.7	1.8	1.5	6.0	
Dave Gambee	F	Oregon State	1	1959–1960	19									
Kevin Gamble	G/F	Iowa	2	1995–1997	83	1,245	134	95	388	15.0	1.6	1.1	4.7	
Francisco García	G/F	Louisville	8	2005–2013	462	10,251	1,238	649	3,848	22.2	2.7	1.4	8.3	
Rudy Gay	F	UConn	4	2013–2017	223	7,692	1,349	622	4,305	34.5	6.0	2.8	19.3	
Gus Gerard	G/F	Virginia	3	1978–1981	145	1,451	303	70	657	10.0	2.1	0.5	4.5	
Dick Gibbs	G/F	UTEP	1	1972–1973	66	733	94	61	207	11.1	1.4	0.9	3.1	
Harry Giles	F/C	Duke	2	2018–2020	104	1,487	410	145	724	14.3	3.9	1.4	7.0	
Ben Gillery	C	Georgetown	1	1988–1989	24	84	23	2	25	3.5	1.0	0.1	1.0	
Herm Gilliam	G/F	Purdue	1	1969–1970	57	1,161	215	178	426	20.4	3.8	3.1	7.5	
Drew Gooden	F	Kansas	1	2008–2009	1	26	13	2	12	26.0	13.0	2.0	12.0	
Brian Grant	F	Xavier	3	1994–1997	182	5,294	1,285	254	2,430	29.1	7.1	1.4	13.4	
Aaron Gray	C	Pittsburgh	1	2013–2014	33	335	103	19	60	10.2	3.1	0.6	1.8	
Devin Gray	F	Clemson	1	1996–1997	3	25	9	2	8	8.3	3.0	0.7	2.7	
Gary Gray	G	Oklahoma City	1	1967–1968	44	276	23	26	105	6.3	0.5	0.6	2.4	
Jeff Grayer	G/F	Iowa State	1	1996–1997	25	316	38	25	91	12.6	1.5	1.0	3.6	
Johnny Green^{+}	F/C	Michigan State	4	1969–1973	301	7,584	2,418	380	3,740	25.2	8.0	1.3	12.4	
Mike Green	F/C	Louisiana Tech	1	1979–1980	21	459	113	28	162	21.9	5.4	1.3	7.7	
Sihugo Green	G/F	Duquesne	2	1956–1957; 1959–1960	33	1,089	207	132	399	33.0	6.3	4.0	12.1	
Donté Greene	F	Syracuse	4	2008–2012	253	4,259	600	183	1,541	16.8	2.4	0.7	6.1	
Orien Greene	G	Louisiana	1	2007–2008	7	61	6	3	6	8.7	0.9	0.4	0.9	
Derek Grimm	F	Missouri	1	1997–1998	9	34	4	0	14	3.8	0.4	0.0	1.6	
Ernie Grunfeld	G/F	Tennessee	3	1979–1982	240	4,873	620	590	2,099	20.3	2.6	2.5	8.7	
Matt Guokas	G/F	Saint Joseph's	4	1971–1974; 1975–1976	187	5,651	455	802	1,337	30.2	2.4	4.3	7.1	
Kyle Guy	G	Missouri	2	2019–2021	34	245	36	33	91	7.2	1.1	1.0	2.7	

=== H ===
All-time roster
Player	Pos.	Pre-draft team	Yrs	Seasons	Statistics									Ref.
Player	Pos.	Pre-draft team	Yrs	Seasons	GP	MP	REB	AST	PTS	MPG	RPG	APG	PPG	Ref.
Happy Hairston	F	NYU	4	1964–1968	260	6,597	1,825	191	3,399	25.4	7.0	0.7	13.1	
Tyrese Haliburton	G	Iowa State	2	2020–2022	109	3,503	372	688	1,480	32.1	3.4	6.3	13.6	
Alex Hannum^	F/C	USC	3	1951–1954	171	2,995	772	245	968	21.4	4.5	1.4	5.7	
Bob Hansen	G	Iowa	2	1990–1992	38	851	100	91	237	22.4	2.6	2.4	6.2	
Glenn Hansen	G	LSU	3	1975–1978	110	1,443	247	93	588	13.1	2.2	0.8	5.3	
Maurice Harkless	F	St. John's	2	2020–2022	73	1,511	188	60	396	20.7	2.6	0.8	5.4	
Chris Harris	G	Dayton	1	1955–1956	26	252	26	26	60	9.7	1.0	1.0	2.3	
Jason Hart	G	Syracuse	2	2005–2007	79	918	86	80	261	11.6	1.1	1.0	3.3	
Vernon Hatton	G	Kentucky	1	1958–1959	22	657	81	30	166	29.9	3.7	1.4	7.5	
Spencer Hawes	F/C	Washington	3	2007–2010	220	5,094	1,215	351	1,933	23.2	5.5	1.6	8.8	
Michael Hawkins	G	Xavier	1	1998–1999	24	203	25	27	36	8.5	1.0	1.1	1.5	
Tom Hawkins	F	Notre Dame	4	1962–1966	310	7,481	2,028	353	2,588	24.1	6.5	1.1	8.3	
Chuck Hayes	F/C	Kentucky	3	2011–2014	144	2,427	580	195	403	16.9	4.0	1.4	2.8	
Killian Hayes^{x}	G	(Germany) Ratiopharm Ulm	1	2025–2026	23	406	54	81	127	17.7	2.3	3.5	5.5	
Nigel Hayes	F	Wisconsin	1	2017–2018	5	105	22	4	18	21.0	4.4	0.8	3.6	
Luther Head	G	Illinois	1	2010–2011	36	586	60	70	200	16.3	1.7	1.9	5.6	
Mark Hendrickson	F	Washington State	1	1997–1998	48	737	143	41	163	15.4	3.0	0.9	3.4	
Don Henriksen	F/C	California	1	1954–1955	56	1,235	435	79	308	22.1	7.8	1.4	5.5	
Carl Henry	G	Kansas	1	1985–1986	28	149	19	4	78	5.3	0.7	0.1	2.8	
Conner Henry	G	UC Santa Barbara	1	1987–1988	15	207	20	26	117	13.8	1.3	1.7	7.8	
Fred Hetzel	F/C	Davidson	1	1968–1969	31	685	140	29	368	22.1	4.5	0.9	11.9	
Art Heyman	G/F	Duke	1	1965–1966	11	100	13	7	40	9.1	1.2	0.6	3.6	
JJ Hickson	F/C	NC State	1	2011–2012	35	644	177	22	165	18.4	5.1	0.6	4.7	
Buddy Hield	G	Oklahoma	6	2016–2022	385	11,589	1,705	979	6,502	30.1	4.4	2.5	16.9	
Mike Higgins	F	Northern Colorado	1	1990–1991	7	61	5	2	16	8.7	0.7	0.3	2.3	
Rod Higgins	F	Fresno State	1	1992–1993	69	1,425	193	119	571	20.7	2.8	1.7	8.3	
George Hill	G	IUPUI	1	2017–2018	43	1,143	117	119	441	26.6	2.7	2.8	10.3	
Darnell Hillman	F/C	San Jose State	1	1978–1979	78	1,618	431	91	547	20.7	5.5	1.2	7.0	
Lew Hitch	F/C	Kansas State	1	1956–1957	30	556	119	15	145	18.5	4.0	0.5	4.8	
Justin Holiday	G/F	Washington	1	2021–2022	25	641	55	38	208	25.6	2.2	1.5	8.3	
Ryan Hollins	C	UCLA	1	2014–2015	46	441	103	14	137	9.6	2.2	0.3	3.0	
Richaun Holmes	F/C	Bowling Green	4	2019–2023	192	4,446	1,259	200	2,006	23.2	6.6	1.0	10.4	
Red Holzman^	G	CCNY	5	1948–1953	307	1,457	298	646	1,970	13.1	1.7	2.1	6.4	
Tyler Honeycutt	F	UCLA	2	2011–2013	24	120	24	9	28	5.0	1.0	0.4	1.2	
Dennis Hopson	G/F	Ohio State	1	1991–1992	69	1,304	206	102	741	18.9	3.0	1.5	10.7	
Eddie House	G	Arizona State	1	2004–2005	50	550	61	67	237	11.0	1.2	1.3	4.7	
Byron Houston	F	Oklahoma State	1	1995–1996	25	276	84	7	86	11.0	3.4	0.3	3.4	
Kevin Huerter	F	Maryland	3	2022–2025	182	4,664	595	461	2,133	25.6	3.3	2.5	11.7	
De'Andre Hunter^{x}	F	Virginia	1	2025–2026	2	51	3	1	15	25.5	1.5	0.5	7.5	
Bobby Hurley	G	Duke	5	1993–1998	242	3,712	253	783	910	15.3	1.0	3.2	3.8	
Greg Hyder	F	Eastern New Mexico	1	1970–1971	77	1,359	332	48	417	17.6	4.3	0.6	5.4	

=== I to J ===
All-time roster
Player	Pos.	Pre-draft team	Yrs	Seasons	Statistics									Ref.
Player	Pos.	Pre-draft team	Yrs	Seasons	GP	MP	REB	AST	PTS	MPG	RPG	APG	PPG	Ref.
Darrall Imhoff	C	California	2	1970–1972	43	902	260	81	298	21.0	6.0	1.9	6.9	
Al Jackson	G	Wilberforce	1	1967–1968	2	17	0	1	0	8.5	0.0	0.5	0.0	
Bobby Jackson	G	Minnesota	6	2000–2005; 2008–2009	365	8,279	1,175	814	3,879	22.7	3.2	2.2	10.6	
Darnell Jackson	F	Kansas	1	2010–2011	59	486	94	14	187	8.2	1.6	0.2	3.2	
Jim Jackson	G	Ohio State	1	2002–2003	63	1,309	262	118	487	20.8	4.2	1.9	7.7	
Josh Jackson	G	Kansas	1	2021–2022	12	123	18	5	52	10.3	1.5	0.4	4.3	
Justin Jackson	G/F	North Carolina	2	2017–2019	120	2,589	333	142	799	21.6	2.8	1.2	6.7	
Michael Jackson	G	Georgetown	3	1987–1990	89	888	70	198	188	10.0	0.8	2.2	2.1	
Henry James	F	St. Mary's (TX)	1	1992–1993	8	79	10	1	60	9.9	1.3	0.1	7.5	
Jerome James	C	Florida A&M	1	1998–1999	16	42	17	1	24	2.6	1.1	0.1	1.5	
Justin James	F	Wyoming	2	2019–2021	72	542	62	40	228	7.5	0.9	0.6	3.2	
DaQuan Jeffries	G	Tulsa	3	2019–2021; 2025–2026	34	433	52	14	144	12.7	1.5	0.4	4.2	
Les Jepsen	C	Iowa	1	1991–1992	31	87	30	1	25	2.8	1.0	0.0	0.8	
Eugene Jeter	G	Portland	1	2010–2011	62	858	70	162	255	13.8	1.1	2.6	4.1	
Anthony Johnson	G	College of Charleston	2	1997–1998; 2007–2008	104	2,676	210	389	678	25.7	2.0	3.7	6.5	
Arnie Johnson	F/C	Bemidji State	5	1948–1953	332	4,142	1,272	731	2,888	30.5	6.2	2.2	8.7	
B. J. Johnson	G	La Salle	1	2018–2019	1	6	0	0	2	6.0	0.0	0.0	2.0	
Eddie Johnson	G/F	Illinois	6	1981–1987	483	15,370	2,457	1,359	9,027	31.8	5.1	2.8	18.7	
James Johnson	F	Wake Forest	1	2012–2013	54	878	145	58	276	16.3	2.7	1.1	5.1	
Ollie Johnson	F	Temple	3	1974–1977	192	4,044	635	281	1,519	21.1	3.3	1.5	7.9	
Orlando Johnson	G	UC Santa Barbara	1	2013–2014	7	50	4	4	9	7.1	0.6	0.6	1.3	
Reggie Johnson	F/C	Tennessee	2	1981–1983	81	1,775	390	79	807	21.9	4.8	1.0	10.0	
Steve Johnson	F/C	Oregon State	3	1981–1984	207	4,178	1,109	249	2,409	20.2	5.4	1.2	11.6	
Colby Jones	G	Xavier	1	2023–2024	30	192	40	20	64	6.4	1.3	0.7	2.1	
Dahntay Jones	G/F	Duke	1	2007–2008	25	206	35	12	81	8.2	1.4	0.5	3.2	
Damian Jones	C	Vanderbilt	2	2020–2022	73	1,358	323	93	572	18.6	4.4	1.3	7.8	
Damon Jones	G	Houston	1	2002–2003	49	709	70	80	224	14.5	1.4	1.6	4.6	
Isaac Jones	F	Washington State	2	2024–2026	43	321	59	13	137	7.5	1.4	0.3	3.2	
Jake Jones	G	Assumption	1	1971–1972	11	161	20	10	57	14.6	1.8	0.9	5.2	
Mason Jones	G	Arkansas	2	2023–2025	15	73	14	16	30	4.9	0.9	1.1	2.0	
Phil Jordon	C	Whitworth	2	1959–1961	123	3,206	1,048	314	1,525	26.1	8.5	2.6	12.4	
Cory Joseph	G	Texas	2	2019–2021	116	2,703	287	359	747	23.3	2.5	3.1	6.4	

=== K to L ===
All-time roster
Player	Pos.	Pre-draft team	Yrs	Seasons	Statistics									Ref.
Player	Pos.	Pre-draft team	Yrs	Seasons	GP	MP	REB	AST	PTS	MPG	RPG	APG	PPG	Ref.
Rich Kelley	F/C	Stanford	1	1985–1986	37	324	81	43	74	8.8	2.2	1.2	2.0	
Toby Kimball	F/C	UConn	1	1972–1973	67	643	191	27	236	9.6	2.9	0.4	3.5	
Stan Kimbrough	G	Xavier	1	1992–1993	3	15	0	1	5	5.0	0.0	0.3	1.7	
George King	G	Charleston	1	1957–1958	63	2,272	306	337	610	36.1	4.9	5.3	9.7	
Jim King	G	Tulsa	1	1969–1970	31	286	46	42	90	9.2	1.5	1.4	2.9	
Louis King	F	Oregon	2	2020–2022	16	189	30	18	89	11.8	1.9	1.1	5.6	
Reggie King	F	Alabama	4	1979–1983	301	8,399	2,115	459	3,129	27.9	7.0	1.5	10.4	
Greg Kite	C	BYU	1	1989–1990	71	1,515	377	76	230	21.3	5.3	1.1	3.2	
Joe Kleine	C	Arkansas	4	1985–1989	288	5,750	1,676	245	2,150	20.0	5.8	0.9	7.5	
Billy Knight	G/F	Pittsburgh	2	1983–1985	91	2,074	277	181	1,039	22.8	3.0	2.0	11.4	
Don Kojis	F	Marquette	3	1972–1975	175	3,563	620	200	1,780	20.4	3.5	1.1	10.2	
Howard Komives	G	Bowling Green	1	1973–1974	44	830	43	97	189	18.9	1.0	2.2	4.3	
Len Kosmalski	C	Tennessee	2	1974–1976	76	506	144	53	110	6.7	1.9	0.7	1.4	
Kosta Koufos	C	Ohio State	4	2015–2019	262	4,794	1,475	203	1,632	18.3	5.6	0.8	6.2	
John Kuester	G	North Carolina	1	1977–1978	78	1,215	114	252	377	15.6	1.5	3.2	4.8	
Skal Labissière	F	Kentucky	4	2016–2019; 2024–2025	110	1,977	477	106	853	18.0	4.3	1.0	7.8	
Sam Lacey^{+} (#44)	C	New Mexico State	12	1970–1982	888	29,991	9,353	3,563	9,895	33.8	10.5	4.0	11.1	
Jeremy Lamb	G/F	UConn	1	2021–2022	17	322	60	30	134	18.9	3.5	1.8	7.9	
John Lambert	F/C	USC	2	1980–1982	85	968	217	48	290	11.4	2.6	0.6	3.4	
Carl Landry	F	Purdue	4	2009–2011; 2013–2015	169	3,885	760	107	1,714	23.0	4.5	0.6	10.1	
Jake LaRavia	F	Wake Forest	1	2024–2025	19	367	54	25	115	19.3	2.8	1.3	6.1	
Zach LaVine^{x}	G	UCLA	2	2024–2026	71	2,394	221	210	1,465	33.7	3.1	3.0	20.6	
Ty Lawson	G	North Carolina	1	2016–2017	69	1,732	179	334	681	25.1	2.6	4.8	9.9	
Eric Leckner	C	Wyoming	1	1990–1991	32	378	87	18	94	11.8	2.7	0.6	2.9	
Doug Lee	G	Purdue	1	1994–1995	22	75	5	5	43	3.4	0.2	0.2	2.0	
Alex Len	C	Maryland	5	2019–2020; 2021–2025	164	1,708	504	145	539	10.4	3.1	0.9	3.3	
Jim Les	G	Bradley	4	1990–1994	208	3,161	276	650	999	15.2	1.3	3.1	4.8	
Andrew Levane	G/F	St. John's	1	1948–1949	36			39	123			1.1	3.4	
Freddie Lewis	G	Arizona State	1	1966–1967	32	334	44	40	149	10.4	1.4	1.3	4.7	
Kevin Loder	G/F	Alabama State	3	1981–1984	147	2,090	338	174	875	14.2	2.3	1.2	6.0	
Brad Lohaus	F/C	Iowa	1	1988–1989	29	476	114	17	233	16.4	3.9	0.6	8.0	
Art Long	F	Cincinnati	1	2000–2001	9	20	8	1	0	2.2	0.9	0.1	0.0	
Bob Love	F	Southern	2	1966–1968	138	2,142	466	104	903	15.5	3.4	0.8	6.5	
Clyde Lovellette^	F/C	Kansas	1	1957–1958	71	2,589	862	134	1,659	36.5	12.1	1.9	23.4	
Jerry Lucas^	F/C	Ohio State	7	1963–1970	465	20,024	8,876	1,408	9,107	43.1	19.1	3.0	19.6	
Trey Lyles	F	Kentucky	4	2021–2025	225	4,301	1,008	250	1,686	19.1	4.5	1.1	7.5	

=== M ===
All-time roster
Player	Pos.	Pre-draft team	Yrs	Seasons	Statistics									Ref.
Player	Pos.	Pre-draft team	Yrs	Seasons	GP	MP	REB	AST	PTS	MPG	RPG	APG	PPG	Ref.
Lionel Malamed	G	CCNY	1	1948–1949	9			6	30			0.7	3.3	
Ted Manakas	G	Princeton	1	1973–1974	5	45	3	2	12	9.0	0.6	0.4	2.4	
Šarūnas Marčiulionis^	G	(Soviet Union) Statyba	1	1995–1996	53	1,039	77	118	571	19.6	1.5	2.2	10.8	
Tom Marshall	G/F	Western Kentucky	4	1954–1955; 1956–1959	159	2,521	484	184	931	15.9	3.0	1.2	5.9	
Darrick Martin	G	UCLA	2	1999–2001	102	1,069	60	136	505	10.5	0.6	1.3	5.0	
Kevin Martin	G	Western Carolina	6	2004–2010	331	10,123	1,211	616	5,660	30.6	3.7	1.9	17.1	
Al Masino	G	Canisius	1	1953–1954	11	50	7	7	23	4.5	0.6	0.6	2.1	
Desmond Mason	F	Oklahoma State	1	2009–2010	5	66	13	2	13	13.2	2.6	0.4	2.6	
Frank Mason III	G	Kansas	2	2017–2019	90	1,419	173	231	608	15.8	1.9	2.6	6.8	
Tony Massenburg	F	Maryland	1	2003–2004	59	789	188	29	251	13.4	3.2	0.5	4.3	
Vernon Maxwell	G	Florida	1	1998–1999	46	1,007	85	76	492	21.9	1.8	1.7	10.7	
Don May	F	Dayton	1	1974–1975	29	139	13	5	64	4.8	0.4	0.2	2.2	
Sean May	F	North Carolina	1	2009–2010	37	331	70	17	123	8.9	1.9	0.5	3.3	
Travis Mays	G	Texas	1	1990–1991	64	2,145	178	253	915	33.5	2.8	4.0	14.3	
Luc Mbah a Moute	F	UCLA	1	2013–2014	9	196	27	15	40	21.8	3.0	1.7	4.4	
Ray McCallum Jr.	G	Detroit Mercy	2	2013–2015	113	2,333	259	308	783	20.6	2.3	2.7	6.9	
Rashad McCants	G	North Carolina	1	2008–2009	24	465	47	36	246	19.4	2.0	1.5	10.3	
Andre McCarter	G	UCLA	2	1976–1978	60	734	56	99	270	12.2	0.9	1.7	4.5	
Johnny McCarthy	G	Canisius	2	1956–1957; 1958–1959	119	3,387	428	332	1,082	28.5	3.6	2.8	9.1	
Rodney McCray	G/F	Louisville	2	1988–1990	150	5,673	1,183	670	2,212	37.8	7.9	4.5	14.7	
Clint McDaniel	G	Arkansas	1	1995–1996	12	71	10	7	30	5.9	0.8	0.6	2.5	
Doug McDermott^{x}	F	Creighton	2	2024–2026	71	781	59	29	311	11.0	0.8	0.4	4.4	
JaVale McGee	C	Nevada	1	2023–2024	46	339	126	17	185	7.4	2.7	0.4	4.0	
Mike McGee	G/F	Michigan	1	1987–1988	37	886	112	58	524	23.9	3.0	1.6	14.2	
Jon McGlocklin	G/F	Indiana	2	1965–1967	132	2,046	297	181	876	15.5	2.3	1.4	6.6	
Gil McGregor	F	Wake Forest	1	1971–1972	42	532	148	18	171	12.7	3.5	0.4	4.1	
Dominic McGuire	F	Fresno State	1	2009–2010	10	67	18	3	8	6.7	1.8	0.3	0.8	
Billy McKinney	G	Northwestern	2	1978–1980	154	2,575	171	501	1,129	16.7	1.1	3.3	7.3	
Jordan McLaughlin	G	USC	1	2024–2025	28	190	21	24	53	6.8	0.8	0.9	1.9	
Ben McLemore	G	Kansas	5	2013–2017; 2018–2019	312	7,634	770	356	2,817	24.5	2.5	1.1	9.0	
Jack McMahon	G	St. John's	4	1952–1956	247	6,219	690	785	2,118	25.2	2.8	3.2	8.6	
Mark McNamara	F/C	California	1	1984–1985	33	210	57	6	79	6.4	1.7	0.2	2.4	
Joe McNamee	F/C	San Francisco	2	1950–1952	84		101	18	137		1.7	0.3	1.6	
Larry McNeill	F/C	Marquette	3	1973–1976	216	3,878	1,153	169	1,889	18.0	5.3	0.8	8.7	
Don Meineke	F/C	Dayton	2	1955–1956; 1957–1958	136	2,040	542	140	816	15.0	4.0	1.0	6.0	
John Mengelt	G	Auburn	2	1971–1973	90	1,650	170	171	845	18.3	1.9	1.9	9.4	
Joe Meriweather	F/C	Southern Illinois	5	1980–1985	319	6,162	1,521	236	2,122	19.3	4.8	0.7	6.7	
Chimezie Metu	F/C	USC	3	2020–2023	162	2,456	645	128	1,081	15.2	4.0	0.8	6.7	
Larry Micheaux	F	Houston	1	1983–1984	39	332	113	19	119	8.5	2.9	0.5	3.1	
Eric Mika	C	BYU	1	2019–2020	1	19	7	0	6	19.0	7.0	0.0	6.0	
Ed Mikan	F/C	DePaul	2	1949–1951	54		25	30	206		2.5	0.6	3.8	
Andre Miller	G	Utah	1	2014–2015	30	622	76	141	172	20.7	2.5	4.7	5.7	
Brad Miller^{+}	C	Purdue	6	2003–2009	385	13,283	3,305	1,542	5,117	34.5	8.6	4.0	13.3	
Oliver Miller	C	Arkansas	1	1998–1999	4	35	8	0	10	8.8	2.0	0.0	2.5	
Quincy Miller	F	Baylor	1	2014–2015	6	61	12	3	17	10.2	2.0	0.5	2.8	
Davion Mitchell	G	Baylor	3	2021–2024	227	4,624	366	632	1,690	20.4	1.6	2.8	7.4	
Cuttino Mobley	G	Rhode Island	1	2004–2005	43	1,662	166	146	765	38.7	3.9	3.4	17.8	
Chima Moneke	F	UC Davis	1	2022–2023	2	8	2	1	2	4.0	1.0	0.5	1.0	
Sergei Monia	F	(Russia) CSKA Moscow	1	2005–2006	3	7	1	0	2	2.3	0.3	0.0	0.7	
Malik Monk^{x}	G	Kentucky	4	2022–2026	276	7,009	777	1,215	4,040	25.4	2.8	4.4	14.6	
Mikki Moore	F/C	Nebraska	2	2007–2009	128	3,131	646	112	858	24.5	5.0	0.9	6.7	
Otto Moore	C	UTPA	1	1973–1974	65	633	200	47	211	9.7	3.1	0.7	3.2	
Eric Moreland	F	Oregon State	2	2014–2016	11	50	12	1	10	4.5	1.1	0.1	0.9	
Emmanuel Mudiay	G	Prime Prep Academy (TX)	1	2021–2022	2	11	0	4	3	5.5	2.0	0.0	1.5	
Ade Murkey	F	Denver	1	2021–2022	1	1	0	0	0	1.0	0.0	0.0	0.0	
Keegan Murray^{x}	F	Iowa	4	2022–2026	256	8,373	1,430	374	3,411	32.7	5.6	1.5	13.3	

=== N to P ===
All-time roster
Player	Pos.	Pre-draft team	Yrs	Seasons	Statistics									Ref.
Player	Pos.	Pre-draft team	Yrs	Seasons	GP	MP	REB	AST	PTS	MPG	RPG	APG	PPG	Ref.
Hamady N'Diaye	C	Rutgers	1	2013–2014	14	74	18	3	6	5.3	1.3	0.2	0.4	
Boris Nachamkin	F	NYU	1	1954–1955	6	59	19	3	20	9.8	3.2	0.5	3.3	
Bob Nash	F	Hawaii	2	1977–1979	148	2,107	375	117	887	14.2	2.5	0.8	6.0	
Kenny Natt	G	Louisiana-Monroe	1	1984–1985	4	16	1	3	0	4.0	0.3	0.8	0.0	
Ed Nealy	F	Kansas State	3	1982–1985	175	2,828	751	130	600	16.2	4.3	0.7	3.4	
Louie Nelson	G	Washington	1	1977–1978	8	53	3	5	15	6.6	0.4	0.6	1.9	
Martin Nessley	C	Duke	1	1987–1988	9	41	9	0	5	4.6	1.0	0.0	0.6	
Andrés Nocioni	F	(Spain) Tau Cerámica	2	2008–2010	98	2,190	361	117	951	22.3	3.7	1.2	9.7	
Paul Noel	F	Kentucky	2	1950–1952	60	32	85	37	136	4.0	1.4	0.6	2.3	
Bevo Nordmann	C	Saint Louis	1	1961–1962	58	344	128	18	131	5.9	2.2	0.3	2.3	
Mike Novak	F/C	Loyola (IL)	2	1948–1950	65			116	323			1.8	5.0	
KZ Okpala	F	Stanford	1	2022–2023	35	248	34	13	46	7.1	1.0	0.4	1.3	
Mark Olberding	F	Minnesota	4	1983–1987	319	7,596	1,566	792	2,448	23.8	4.9	2.5	7.7	
Jawann Oldham	C	Seattle	1	1987–1988	54	946	304	33	297	17.5	5.6	0.6	5.5	
Kevin Ollie	G	UConn	1	1998–1999	7	68	6	3	12	9.7	0.9	0.4	1.7	
Bud Olsen	F/C	Louisville	4	1962–1966	184	2,294	600	157	914	12.5	3.3	0.9	5.0	
Greg Ostertag	C	Kansas	1	2004–2005	56	556	167	37	87	9.9	3.0	0.7	1.6	
Travis Outlaw	F	Starkville HS (MS)	3	2011–2014	140	2,009	290	85	710	14.4	2.1	0.6	5.1	
Billy Owens	G/F	Syracuse	3	1995–1998	166	4,937	1,099	476	1,760	29.7	6.6	2.9	10.6	
Jim Palmer	F/C	Dayton	2	1958–1960	87	2,024	583	82	871	23.3	6.7	0.9	10.0	
Georgios Papagiannis	C	(Greece) Panathinaikos	2	2016–2018	38	473	122	29	158	12.4	3.2	0.8	4.2	
Med Park	G/F	Missouri	2	1958–1960	107	2,747	451	294	960	25.7	4.2	2.7	9.0	
Jabari Parker	F	Duke	2	2019–2021	9	107	29	11	59	11.9	3.2	1.2	6.6	
Jack Parr	C	Kansas State	1	1958–1959	66	1,037	278	51	262	15.7	4.2	0.8	4.0	
Patrick Patterson	F	Kentucky	2	2012–2014	41	971	215	45	311	23.7	5.2	1.1	7.6	
Charlie Paulk	F/C	Northeastern State	1	1970–1971	68	1,213	320	27	627	17.8	4.7	0.4	9.2	
Jerry Paulson	G	Manhattan	1	1957–1958	6	68	10	4	20	11.3	1.7	0.7	3.3	
Jim Paxson Sr.	G/F	Dayton	1	1957–1958	67	1,795	350	139	659	26.8	5.2	2.1	9.8	
Anthony Peeler	G	Missouri	1	2003–2004	75	1,391	153	120	431	18.5	2.0	1.6	5.7	
Norvel Pelle	C	Price HS (CA)	1	2020–2021	1	4	1	1	3	4.0	1.0	1.0	3.0	
Mike Peplowski	C	Michigan State	1	1993–1994	55	667	169	24	176	12.1	3.1	0.4	3.2	
Jim Petersen	F/C	Minnesota	1	1988–1989	66	1,633	413	81	671	24.7	6.3	1.2	10.2	
Filip Petrušev	F/C	(Serbia) Mega Basket	1	2023–2024	2	7	0	0	3	3.5	0.0	0.0	1.5	
Derrick Phelps	G	North Carolina	1	1994–1995	3	5	0	1	0	1.7	0.0	0.3	0.0	
Ed Pinckney	F	Villanova	2	1987–1989	130	2,511	531	140	1,116	19.3	4.1	1.1	8.6	
Dave Piontek	F/C	Xavier	5	1956–1960; 1962–1963	314	6,033	1,427	394	2,445	19.2	4.5	1.3	7.8	
Daeqwon Plowden^{x}	G	Bowling Green	1	2025–2026	32	844	97	41	344	26.4	3.0	1.3	10.8	
Scot Pollard	C	Kansas	5	1998–2003	272	5,459	1,622	153	1,604	20.1	6.0	0.6	5.9	
Olden Polynice	F/C	Virginia	5	1993–1998	345	10,378	3,053	424	3,740	30.1	8.8	1.2	10.8	
David Pope	F	Norfolk State	1	1984–1985	22	129	18	5	41	5.9	0.8	0.2	1.9	
Vitaly Potapenko	C	Wright State	2	2005–2007	12	45	4	2	10	3.8	0.3	0.2	0.8	
Harold Pressley	G/F	Villanova	4	1986–1990	299	6,802	1,339	628	2,702	22.7	4.5	2.1	9.0	
Brent Price	G	Oklahoma	1	2001–2002	20	89	8	9	31	4.5	0.4	0.5	1.6	
Ronnie Price	G	Utah Valley	2	2005–2007	87	713	86	59	252	8.2	1.0	0.7	2.9	

=== Q to R ===
All-time roster
Player	Pos.	Pre-draft team	Yrs	Seasons	Statistics									Ref.
Player	Pos.	Pre-draft team	Yrs	Seasons	GP	MP	REB	AST	PTS	MPG	RPG	APG	PPG	Ref.
Neemias Queta	C	Utah State	2	2021–2023	20	149	42	7	57	7.5	2.1	0.4	2.9	
Luther Rackley	C	Xavier	1	1969–1970	66	1,256	378	56	504	19.0	5.7	0.8	7.6	
Ray Ragelis	F	Northwestern	1	1951–1952	51	337	76	31	68	6.6	1.5	0.6	1.3	
Kurt Rambis	F	Santa Clara	1	1992–1993	67	781	221	52	168	11.7	3.3	0.8	2.5	
Jahmi'us Ramsey	G	Texas Tech	2	2020–2022	32	228	23	13	100	7.1	0.7	0.4	3.1	
Zach Randolph	F/C	Michigan State	1	2017–2018	59	1,508	397	127	857	25.6	6.7	2.2	14.5	
Sam Ranzino	G	NC State	1	1951–1952	39	234	39	25	86	6.0	1.0	0.6	2.2	
Mike Ratliff	C	Wisconsin-Eau Claire	2	1972–1974	60	685	194	38	241	11.4	3.2	0.6	4.0	
Maxime Raynaud^{x}	C	Stanford	1	2025–2026	74	1,964	556	100	922	26.5	7.5	1.4	12.5	
Frank Reddout	F	Syracuse	1	1953–1954	7	18	9	0	13	2.6	1.3	0.0	1.9	
Marlon Redmond	G	San Francisco	2	1978–1980	73	1,034	160	76	497	14.2	2.2	1.0	6.8	
Hub Reed	F/C	Oklahoma City	4	1959–1963	304	5,764	1,817	274	2,007	19.0	6.0	0.9	6.6	
Richie Regan^{+}	G	Seton Hall	3	1955–1958	215	5,494	554	629	1,785	25.6	2.6	2.9	8.3	
Kevin Restani	F/C	San Francisco	1	1977–1978	46	463	94	21	127	10.1	2.0	0.5	2.8	
Malachi Richardson	G	Syracuse	2	2016–2018	47	517	56	24	166	11.0	1.2	0.5	3.5	
Mitch Richmond^ (#2)	G	Kansas State	7	1991–1998	517	19,532	1,933	2,128	12,070	37.8	3.7	4.1	23.3	
Dick Ricketts	F/C	Duquesne	3	1955–1958	183	4,900	1,141	365	1,731	26.8	6.2	2.0	9.5	
Ron Riley	F	USC	2	1972–1974	86	1,804	563	84	687	21.0	6.5	1.0	8.0	
Arnie Risen^	F/C	Ohio State	7	1948–1955	463	9,039	3,812	867	6,359	32.9	11.2	1.9	13.7	
Rick Roberson	F/C	Cincinnati	1	1975–1976	74	709	233	53	188	9.6	3.1	0.7	2.5	
Oscar Robertson^ (#14)	G/F	Cincinnati	10	1960–1970	752	33,088	6,380	7,731	22,009	44.0	8.5	10.3	29.3	
Ryan Robertson	G	Kansas	1	1999–2000	1	25	0	0	5	25.0	0.0	0.0	5.0	
Chris Robinson	G	Western Kentucky	1	1997–1998	19	271	33	29	108	14.3	1.7	1.5	5.7	
Cliff Robinson	F	USC	1	1981–1982	38	1,229	322	71	769	32.3	8.5	1.9	20.2	
Flynn Robinson	G	Wyoming	3	1966–1968; 1970–1971	149	2,524	280	253	1,620	16.9	1.9	1.7	10.9	
Glenn Robinson III	F	Michigan	1	2020–2021	23	369	45	20	121	16.0	2.0	0.9	5.3	
Justin Robinson	G	Virginia Tech	1	2021–2022	3	15	1	2	2	5.0	0.3	0.7	0.7	
Orlando Robinson	C	Fresno State	1	2024–2025	9	57	14	9	19	6.3	1.6	1.0	2.1	
Thomas Robinson	F	Kansas	1	2012–2013	51	809	238	36	247	15.9	4.7	0.7	4.8	
Bill Robinzine	F	DePaul	5	1975–1980	395	8,765	2,532	393	4,215	22.2	6.4	1.0	10.7	
Dave Robisch	F/C	Kansas	1	1983–1984	8	162	29	6	47	20.3	3.6	0.8	5.9	
Guy Rodgers^	G	Temple	1	1967–1968	75	1,417	136	352	362	18.9	1.8	4.7	4.8	
Sergio Rodríguez	G	(Spain) Estudiantes	1	2009–2010	39	517	50	121	234	13.3	1.3	3.1	6.0	
Johnny Rogers	F/C	UC Irvine	1	1986–1987	45	468	77	26	189	10.4	1.7	0.6	4.2	
Phil Rollins	G	Louisville	3	1958–1961	107	1,761	276	302	561	16.5	2.6	2.8	5.2	
Rajon Rondo	G	Kentucky	1	2015–2016	72	2,537	435	839	859	35.2	6.0	11.7	11.9	

=== S ===
All-time roster
Player	Pos.	Pre-draft team	Yrs	Seasons	Statistics									Ref.
Player	Pos.	Pre-draft team	Yrs	Seasons	GP	MP	REB	AST	PTS	MPG	RPG	APG	PPG	Ref.
Domantas Sabonis*	F/C	Gonzaga	5	2021–2026	265	9,161	3,466	1,834	5,024	34.6	13.1	6.9	19.0	
John Salmons	G	Miami (FL)	6	2006–2009; 2011–2014	353	10,605	1,221	1,021	3,777	30.0	3.5	2.9	10.7	
Kevin Salvadori	C	North Carolina	2	1996–1998	39	241	45	13	42	6.2	1.2	0.3	1.1	
JaKarr Sampson	G/F	St. John's	1	2017–2018	22	344	78	9	103	15.6	3.5	0.4	4.7	
Jamal Sampson	F/C	California	1	2005–2006	12	39	18	5	10	3.3	1.5	0.4	0.8	
Ralph Sampson^	C	Virginia	2	1989–1991	51	765	195	45	183	15.0	3.8	0.9	3.6	
Frankie Sanders	G/F	Southern	1	1980–1981	23	186	21	17	88	8.1	0.9	0.7	3.8	
Dario Šarić	C	(Croatia) Cibona	1	2025–2026	5	41	6	2	5	8.2	1.2	0.4	1.0	
Frank Saul	G/F	Seton Hall	2	1949–1951	114		84	96	464		1.3	0.8	4.1	
Frank Schade	G	Wisconsin-Eau Claire	1	1972–1973	9	76	6	10	10	8.4	0.7	1.1	1.1	
Steve Scheffler	F/C	Purdue	1	1991–1992	4	15	3	0	9	3.8	0.8	0.0	2.3	
Dwayne Schintzius	C	Florida	1	1991–1992	33	400	118	20	110	12.1	3.6	0.6	3.3	
Dennis Schröder	G	(Germany) Löwen Braunschweig	1	2025–2026	40	1,056	122	211	510	26.4	3.1	5.3	12.8	
Ramon Sessions	G	Nevada	1	2014–2015	36	642	69	96	196	17.8	1.9	2.7	5.4	
Iman Shumpert	G	Georgia Tech	1	2018–2019	42	1,099	129	91	374	26.2	3.1	2.2	8.9	
Sam Sibert	F	Kentucky State	1	1972–1973	5	26	4	0	12	5.2	0.8	0.0	2.4	
Chris Silva	F	South Carolina	1	2020–2021	4	9	2	0	2	2.3	0.5	0.0	0.5	
Cedric Simmons	F	NC State	1	2008–2009	7	23	4	0	1	3.3	0.6	0.0	0.1	
Connie Simmons	F/C	Flushing HS (NY)	1	1955–1956	68	903	235	82	366	13.3	3.5	1.2	5.4	
Lionel Simmons	F	La Salle	7	1990–1997	454	13,472	2,833	1,498	5,833	29.7	6.2	3.3	12.8	
Doug Sims	F	Kent State	1	1968–1969	4	12	4	0	4	3.0	1.0	0.0	1.0	
Brian Skinner	F	Baylor	2	2004–2006	63	1,124	319	55	272	17.8	5.1	0.9	4.3	
Jalen Slawson	F	Furman	1	2023–2024	12	37	7	2	8	3.1	0.6	0.2	0.7	
Adrian Smith^{+}	G	Kentucky	9	1961–1970	653	17,443	1,507	1,580	8,085	26.7	2.3	2.4	12.4	
Derek Smith	G/F	Louisville	3	1986–1989	116	3,157	366	353	1,595	27.2	3.2	3.0	13.8	
Jabari Smith	C	LSU	3	2000–2002; 2003–2004	52	305	53	23	108	5.9	1.0	0.4	2.1	
Kenny Smith	G	North Carolina	3	1987–1990	188	7,062	484	1,358	2,932	37.6	2.6	7.2	15.6	
LaBradford Smith	G	Louisville	1	1993–1994	59	829	76	104	301	14.1	1.3	1.8	5.1	
Michael Smith	F	Providence	4	1994–1998	246	5,993	1,744	397	1,525	24.4	7.1	1.6	6.2	
Will Solomon	G	Clemson	1	2008–2009	14	168	21	10	70	12.0	1.5	0.7	5.0	
Darius Songaila	F	Wake Forest	2	2003–2005	154	2,644	569	162	945	17.2	3.7	1.1	6.1	
Rory Sparrow	G	Villanova	1	1990–1991	80	2,375	186	362	831	29.7	2.3	4.5	10.4	
Odie Spears	G	Western Kentucky	4	1951–1955	271	6,608	1,163	533	2,384	24.4	4.3	2.0	8.8	
Andre Spencer	F	Northern Arizona	1	1993–1994	23	286	61	19	138	12.4	2.7	0.8	6.0	
Art Spoelstra	C	Western Kentucky	3	1954–1957	211	3,943	941	209	1,563	18.7	4.5	1.0	7.4	
Nik Stauskas	G	Michigan	1	2014–2015	73	1,127	88	67	319	15.4	1.2	0.9	4.4	
Larry Staverman	F	Thomas More	4	1958–1961; 1963–1964	206	2,424	779	194	870	11.8	3.8	0.9	4.2	
Brook Steppe	G	Georgia Tech	2	1982–1983; 1986–1987	96	1,271	134	149	511	13.2	1.4	1.6	5.3	
Isaiah Stevens^{x}	G	Colorado State	1	2025–2026	3	43	3	10	10	14.3	1.0	3.3	3.3	
Wayne Stevens	F	Cincinnati	1	1959–1960	8	49	16	4	13	6.1	2.0	0.5	1.6	
Michael Stewart	C	California	1	1997–1998	81	1,761	536	61	375	21.7	6.6	0.8	4.6	
David Stockton	G	Gonzaga	1	2014–2015	3	33	2	9	8	11.0	0.7	3.0	2.7	
Peja Stojaković^{+} (#16)	G/F	(Greece) PAOK	8	1998–2006	518	17,723	2,581	1,037	9,498	34.2	5.0	2.0	18.3	
Greg Stokes	F/C	Iowa	1	1989–1990	11	34	5	0	4	3.1	0.5	0.0	0.4	
Maurice Stokes^ (#12)	F/C	Saint Francis (PA)	3	1955–1958	202	7,544	3,492	1,062	3,315	37.3	17.3	5.3	16.4	
Dane Suttle	G	Pepperdine	2	1983–1985	46	493	49	48	272	10.7	1.1	1.0	5.9	
Caleb Swanigan	F	Purdue	2	2018–2020	10	56	19	6	13	5.6	1.9	0.6	1.3	
Norm Swanson	F	Detroit Mercy	1	1953–1954	63	611	110	33	100	9.7	1.7	0.5	1.6	

=== T ===
All-time roster
Player	Pos.	Pre-draft team	Yrs	Seasons	Statistics									Ref.
Player	Pos.	Pre-draft team	Yrs	Seasons	GP	MP	REB	AST	PTS	MPG	RPG	APG	PPG	Ref.
Brian Taylor	G	Princeton	1	1976–1977	72	2,488	238	320	1,227	34.6	3.3	4.4	17.0	
Fred Taylor	G/F	UTPA	1	1971–1972	21	214	37	11	71	10.2	1.8	0.5	3.4	
Jermaine Taylor	G	UCF	1	2010–2011	26	406	53	30	184	15.6	2.0	1.2	7.1	
Maurice Taylor	F	Michigan	1	2006–2007	12	103	28	5	24	8.6	2.3	0.4	2.0	
Terry Taylor	F	Austin Peay	1	2024–2025	3	6	1	2	0	2.0	0.3	0.7	0.0	
Garrett Temple	G	LSU	3	2009–2010; 2016–2018	135	3,366	339	294	1,064	24.9	2.5	2.2	7.9	
Tom Thacker	G/F	Cincinnati	3	1963–1966	153	1,405	361	153	450	9.2	2.4	1.0	2.9	
Reggie Theus	G	UNLV	5	1983–1988	346	11,884	1,155	2,809	6,492	34.3	3.3	8.1	18.8	
Justus Thigpen	G	Weber State	1	1973–1974	1	2	1	0	2	2.0	1.0	0.0	2.0	
Carl Thomas	G	Eastern Michigan	1	1991–1992	1	31	0	1	12	31.0	0.0	1.0	12.0	
Isaiah Thomas	G	Washington	3	2011–2014	216	6,275	539	1,036	3,314	29.1	2.5	4.8	15.3	
Kenny Thomas	F	New Mexico	6	2004–2010	227	5,184	1,384	348	1,536	22.8	6.1	1.5	6.8	
Jason Thompson	F/C	Rider	7	2008–2015	541	14,348	3,746	606	5,063	26.5	6.9	1.1	9.4	
LaSalle Thompson	F/C	Texas	7	1982–1989	507	12,436	4,214	651	5,306	24.5	8.3	1.3	10.5	
Stephen Thompson	G	Syracuse	1	1991–1992	18	76	18	7	29	4.2	1.0	0.4	1.6	
Tristan Thompson	F/C	Texas	1	2021–2022	30	455	161	18	185	15.2	5.4	0.6	6.2	
Marcus Thornton	G	LSU	4	2010–2014	196	5,657	620	328	2,825	28.9	3.2	1.7	14.4	
Otis Thorpe	F/C	Providence	5	1984–1988; 1997–1998	348	10,244	2,798	723	5,269	29.4	8.0	2.1	15.1	
Dan Tieman	G	Thomas More	1	1962–1963	29	176	22	27	34	6.1	0.8	0.9	1.2	
Wayman Tisdale	F/C	Oklahoma	6	1988–1994	370	12,522	2,676	580	6,808	33.8	7.2	1.6	18.4	
Anthony Tolliver	F/C	Creighton	2	2016–2017; 2019–2020	74	1,559	248	80	470	21.1	3.4	1.1	6.4	
Sedric Toney	G	Dayton	1	1989–1990	32	682	46	122	176	21.3	1.4	3.8	5.5	
Juan Toscano-Anderson	F	Marquette	1	2023–2024	11	53	14	4	7	4.8	1.3	0.4	0.6	
John Tresvant	F/C	Seattle	2	1967–1969	81	2,483	588	149	917	30.7	7.3	1.8	11.3	
Al Tucker	F	Oklahoma Baptist	1	1968–1969	28	626	122	19	301	22.4	4.4	0.7	10.8	
Hedo Türkoğlu	F	(Turkey) Efes Pilsen	3	2000–2003	221	4,390	761	319	1,648	19.9	3.4	1.4	7.5	
Bill Turner	F	Akron	1	1969–1970	69	1,095	290	42	494	15.9	4.2	0.6	7.2	
Henry Turner	G/F	Cal State Fullerton	2	1989–1990; 1994–1995	66	464	78	29	224	7.0	1.2	0.4	3.4	
Jack Twyman^ (#27)	G/F	Cincinnati	11	1955–1966	823	26,147	5,424	1,861	15,840	31.8	6.6	2.3	19.2	
Terry Tyler	G/F	Detroit Mercy	3	1985–1988	227	4,766	883	223	1,844	21.0	3.9	1.0	8.1	

=== U to Z ===
All-time roster
Player	Pos.	Pre-draft team	Yrs	Seasons	Statistics									Ref.
Player	Pos.	Pre-draft team	Yrs	Seasons	GP	MP	REB	AST	PTS	MPG	RPG	APG	PPG	Ref.
Ime Udoka	F	Portland State	1	2009–2010	69	944	191	58	250	13.7	2.8	0.8	3.6	
Beno Udrih	G	(Italy) Olimpia Milano	4	2007–2011	296	9,561	921	1,382	3,743	32.3	3.1	4.7	12.6	
Jonas Valančiūnas	C	(Lithuania) Rytas	1	2024–2025	32	541	223	56	279	16.9	7.0	1.8	8.7	
Tom Van Arsdale^{+}	G/F	Indiana	6	1967–1973	379	13,311	1,934	908	7,278	35.1	5.1	2.4	19.2	
Norm Van Lier	G	Saint Francis (PA)	3	1969–1972	173	6,494	1,050	1,383	2,158	37.5	6.1	8.0	12.5	
Greivis Vásquez	G	Maryland	1	2013–2014	18	465	34	95	176	25.8	1.9	5.3	9.8	
Peter Verhoeven	F	Fresno State	1	1984–1985	54	366	63	17	123	6.8	1.2	0.3	2.3	
Aleksandar Vezenkov	F	(Spain) FC Barcelona	1	2023–2024	42	511	96	19	225	12.2	2.3	0.5	5.4	
Jimmy Walker	G	Providence	3	1973–1976	226	8,532	618	705	3,925	37.8	2.7	3.1	17.4	
Gerald Wallace	F	Alabama	3	2001–2004	138	1,338	291	69	468	9.7	2.1	0.5	3.4	
Lloyd Walton	G	Marquette	1	1980–1981	61	821	48	208	206	13.5	0.8	3.4	3.4	
Bobby Wanzer^	G	Seton Hall	9	1948–1957	568	12,128	1,979	1,830	6,924	32.5	4.5	3.2	12.2	
Jim Ware	F	Oklahoma City	1	1966–1967	33	201	69	6	70	6.1	2.1	0.2	2.1	
Richard Washington	F/C	UCLA	3	1976–1979	178	4,657	1,400	210	2,107	26.2	7.9	1.2	11.8	
Darryl Watkins	C	Syracuse	1	2007–2008	9	71	12	0	12	7.9	1.3	0.0	1.3	
David Wear	F	UCLA	1	2014–2015	2	7	2	1	0	3.5	1.0	0.5	0.0	
Spud Webb	G	NC State	4	1991–1995	301	10,084	812	2,024	4,114	33.5	2.7	6.7	13.7	
Chris Webber^ (#4)	F	Michigan	7	1998–2005	377	14,627	4,006	1,791	8,843	38.8	10.6	4.8	23.5	
Scott Wedman^{+}	G/F	Colorado	7	1974–1981	546	18,973	3,270	1,271	9,002	34.7	6.0	2.3	16.5	
Bonzi Wells	G/F	Ball State	1	2005–2006	52	1,684	401	144	707	32.4	7.7	2.8	13.6	
Bill Wennington	C	St. John's	2	1990–1991; 1999–2000	84	1,512	359	70	451	18.0	4.3	0.8	5.4	
Walt Wesley	C	Kansas	3	1966–1969	212	3,161	1,013	100	1,390	14.9	4.8	0.5	6.6	
Russell Westbrook^{x}	G	UCLA	1	2025–2026	64	1,853	348	426	971	29.0	5.4	6.7	15.2	
Jo Jo White^	G	Kansas	1	1980–1981	13	236	21	37	83	18.2	1.6	2.8	6.4	
Royce White	F	Iowa State	1	2013–2014	3	9	0	0	0	3.0	0.0	0.0	0.0	
Hassan Whiteside	C	Marshall	3	2010–2012; 2020–2021	55	657	254	20	322	11.9	4.6	0.4	5.9	
Charles Whitney	G/F	NC State	2	1980–1982	70	1,048	146	87	404	15.0	2.1	1.2	5.8	
Bob Wiesenhahn	F	Cincinnati	1	1961–1962	60	326	112	23	119	5.4	1.9	0.4	2.0	
Win Wilfong	G/F	Memphis	2	1959–1961	134	2,709	499	352	1,011	20.2	3.7	2.6	7.5	
Derrick Williams	F	Arizona	2	2013–2015	141	3,120	499	105	1,187	22.1	3.5	0.7	8.4	
Jason Williams	G	Florida	3	1998–2001	208	6,855	568	1,304	2,360	33.0	2.7	6.3	11.3	
Justin Williams	F	Wyoming	2	2006–2008	48	450	163	2	162	9.4	3.4	0.0	3.4	
Mike Williams	F	Bradley	1	1989–1990	16	88	22	2	15	5.5	1.4	0.1	0.9	
Nate Williams	G/F	Utah State	4	1971–1975	293	7,796	1,234	562	3,799	26.6	4.2	1.9	13.0	
Ray Williams	G	Minnesota	1	1982–1983	72	2,170	327	569	1,109	30.1	4.5	7.9	15.4	
Shelden Williams	F	Duke	2	2007–2009	58	667	176	16	258	11.5	3.0	0.3	4.4	
Terrence Williams	F	Louisville	1	2011–2012	18	369	74	55	159	20.5	4.1	3.1	8.8	
Troy Williams	F	Indiana	1	2018–2019	21	312	59	11	111	14.9	2.8	0.5	5.3	
Walt Williams	G/F	Maryland	4	1992–1996	238	7,149	1,052	791	3,556	30.0	4.4	3.3	14.9	
Willie Williams	F	Florida State	1	1970–1971	9	49	13	6	8	5.4	1.4	0.7	0.9	
Corliss Williamson	F	Arkansas	8	1995–2000; 2004–2007	466	10,671	1,751	613	5,026	22.9	3.8	1.3	10.8	
George Wilson	C	Cincinnati	3	1964–1967	98	689	243	28	255	7.0	2.5	0.3	2.6	
Othell Wilson	G	Virginia	1	1986–1987	53	789	81	207	210	14.9	1.5	3.9	4.0	
Trevor Wilson	F	UCLA	2	1993–1995	67	1,242	271	72	462	18.5	4.0	1.1	6.9	
Lee Winfield	G	North Texas	1	1975–1976	22	214	24	19	73	9.7	1.1	0.9	3.3	
Randy Wittman	G/F	Indiana	1	1988–1989	31	416	26	32	118	13.4	0.8	1.0	3.8	
Leon Wood	G	Cal State Fullerton	1	1990–1991	12	222	19	49	81	18.5	1.6	4.1	6.8	
Robert Woodard II	F	Mississippi State	2	2020–2022	25	87	27	5	27	3.5	1.1	0.2	1.1	
Mike Woodson	G/F	Indiana	5	1981–1986	387	10,865	1,081	975	6,314	28.1	2.8	2.5	16.3	
Antoine Wright	G/F	Texas A&M	1	2010–2011	7	31	3	0	2	4.4	0.4	0.0	0.3	
Delon Wright	G	Utah	1	2020–2021	27	696	105	97	271	25.8	3.9	3.6	10.0	
Lorenzen Wright	F/C	Memphis	1	2007–2008	5	13	1	1	2	2.6	0.2	0.2	0.4	
Dave Zeller	G	Miami (OH)	1	1961–1962	61	278	27	58	90	4.6	0.4	1.0	1.5	
