= Chris Harris (basketball) =

British basketball player (1933–2022)

Personal information
- Born: 11 August 1933 Southampton, England
- Died: 2 October 2022 (aged 89) Dayton, Ohio, U.S.
- Listed height: 6 ft 3 in (1.91 m)
- Listed weight: 190 lb (86 kg)

Career information
- High school: Sewanhaka (Floral Park, New York)
- College: Dayton (1951–1955)
- NBA draft: 1955: undrafted
- Playing career: 1955–1956
- Position: Shooting guard
- Number: 24, 3

Career history
- 1955–1956: St. Louis Hawks
- 1956: Rochester Royals
- Stats at NBA.com
- Stats at Basketball Reference

Christopher R. Harris (11 August 1933 - 2 October 2022) was a British professional basketball player and sports broadcaster. A 6'3" shooting guard, he was the first player from the United Kingdom to compete in the American National Basketball Association (NBA), as well as the first undrafted foreign-born player to play in the league's history.

== Early life ==
Harris moved from Southampton to New York City when he was young. For generations, cross-Atlantic shipping was the family trade, on both his mother's and father's side. Two of his uncles, Charles and Clifford Harris, were White Star Line crewmembers who went down on the Titanic. The game of basketball was a mystery to his relatives. In a 2004 interview, Harris said, "My folks didn't even know what basketball was. I remember as a kid, I had a little basket in my back yard on dirt, but they kept telling me to play soccer. I replied, 'Nope, I'm going to play basketball in the pros.' They were laughing at me but after a while they knew it was going to be basketball for me."

== College career ==
When Harris was 18, he received a basketball scholarship to the University of Dayton, where he became a teammate of Jim Paxson, Sr., father of future NBA players Jim and John. Due to the Korean War, freshmen were allowed to play on varsity teams in 1951, so Harris participated on a powerful Flyers team led by All-American Don Meineke, who would go on to become the NBA's first Rookie of the Year the following year. That Dayton squad went 28–5 in 1951-52 and advanced to the final game of the National Invitational Tournament at Madison Square Garden in New York City, considered at that time the national championship of college basketball. Dayton would lose to La Salle 75–64 on March 15, 1952. The Flyers had a disappointing 1952–53 season, finishing 16-13 and not advancing to the NIT. However, in the second-to-last game of that year, on March 1, 1953, Harris played every minute in Dayton's 71–65 victory over number-one ranked Seton Hall University, scoring the game's final point on a free throw. The loss was the first for Seton Hall in 28 games. The Flyers rebounded with a 25–7 record in 1953–54, led by Harris, All-America forward John Horan, seven-foot All-America center Bill Uhl, forward Jack Sallee and guard Don Donoher, who would later become University of Dayton head basketball coach from 1964 to 1989, assistant coach on the 1984 Gold Medal-winning men's basketball team at the Los Angeles Olympic Games, and a 2015 inductee into the National Collegiate Basketball Hall of Fame. Dayton would advance to the NIT Quarterfinals that year, losing to Niagara 77–74 on March 8, 1954.

As he entered his senior year, Harris had earned a national reputation as an exceptional passer and one of the game's top defensive specialists. “He was very good at covering guards. He had a textbook stance, like a boxer’s stance. He could move his feet,” Donoher said. “He wasn’t lightning quick, but he could play up on an offensive player so tight. And he was the first Dayton player I remember who took charges. He was very clever at getting into position and taking a charge.”

After finishing the regular season with a 21–3 record, Dayton was back in the NIT, beating St. Louis in the first round with Harris setting a Madison Square Garden record for assists with 13. In the Quarterfinals Dayton beat Maurice Stokes and St. Francis 79–73 in overtime and reached the NIT Finals again, losing to Sihugo Green and fourth-ranked Duquesne University 70–58 on March 19. 1955. It was the second time in his college career Harris would play in the national championship game, in his adopted hometown of New York City, and Dayton would compile a record of 94–29 in his four years there.

== Professional career ==
After graduating from college, Harris spent one season in the NBA. He originally signed with the St. Louis Hawks, but after 15 games they traded him and Dick Ricketts to the Rochester Royals for Jack Coleman and Jack McMahon. In 41 total games with the Hawks and Royals, Harris averaged 2.5 points per game on 24.8% shooting and made $4,800. He decided to end his NBA career after that season, since his wife was pregnant and he was planning a new business.

Harris developed a close friendship with Chuck Cooper of the Boston Celtics, the first black player drafted by the NBA. "He was a huge jazz buff and I loved jazz music", said Harris. "I was a huge fan. So any time we’d got to the big towns, he’d go look for the jazz club and take me with him. We had a wonderful time. He was a gentleman."

Harris had a chance to return to the NBA the following summer, after joining a group of Dayton alumni in an informal game against the Hawks. He played well enough that Hawks coach Alex Hannum asked him to be his fourth guard, but Harris declined. The Hawks would win the NBA championship that year.

== Post-playing career ==
Harris left the game to become a successful businessman, operating a chain of television and appliance stores and an advertising agency in the Dayton area. He later worked as a vice president for an insurance company. Harris also became one of the region's best-known broadcasters, providing play-by-play of University of Dayton basketball games as "the Voice of the Flyers" for WHIO Radio (CBS) from 1965 to 1981, including calling games that would feature his Flyer sons, Doug (1975–1979) and Ted (1981–1985). He also served as that station's sports director for many years. Harris and his wife, Barbara — 1953 winner of the Arthur Godfrey Talent Scouts — married in 1955 and had 10 children. Despite his short career in the League, he remained active in the National Basketball Retired Players Association.

In 2013, Harris was inducted into the University of Dayton Athletic Hall of Fame.

== Career statistics ==
Legend
GP	Games played	GS	Games started	MPG	Minutes per game
FG%	Field goal percentage	3P%	3-point field goal percentage	FT%	Free throw percentage
RPG	Rebounds per game	APG	Assists per game	SPG	Steals per game
BPG	Blocks per game	PPG	Points per game	**Bold**	Career high

=== NBA ===
==== Regular season ====
Year	Team	GP	MPG	FG%	FT%	RPG	APG	PPG
1955–56	St. Louis	15	**11.2**	**.250**	**.611**	**1.2**	**1.2**	**2.7**
1955–56	Rochester	**26**	9.7	.247	.593	1.0	1.0	2.3
Career		41	10.2	.248	.600	1.1	1.1	2.5
