= 1955–56 Rochester Royals season =

NBA professional basketball team season

- Head coach: Bobby Wanzer
- Owners: Jack Harrison; Les Harrison
- Arena: Rochester Community War Memorial

Results
- Record: 31–41 (.431)
- Place: Division: 4th (Western)
- Playoff finish: Did not qualify
- Stats at Basketball Reference

Local media
- Television: WHAM-TV
- Radio: WROC

The 1955–56 Rochester Royals season was the Royals eighth season in the NBA.

== Regular season ==
=== Season standings ===
Western Division	W	L	PCT	GB	Home	Road	Neutral	Div
x-Fort Wayne Pistons	37	35	.514	-	19-7	10-17	8-11	19-17
x-Minneapolis Lakers	33	39	.458	4	14-12	6-21	13-6	19-17
x-St. Louis Hawks	33	39	.458	4	15-11	11-17	7-11	18-18
Rochester Royals	31	41	.431	6	15-14	6-21	10-6	16-20

x – clinched playoff spot

=== Game log ===
1955–56 Game log
#	Date	Opponent	Score	High points	Record
1	November 5	New York	100–98 (OT)	Maurice Stokes (32)	0–1
2	November 6	Syracuse	80–83	Maurice Stokes (17)	1–1
3	November 10	N Philadelphia	84–89	Maurice Stokes (26)	1–2
4	November 12	N Fort Wayne	84–79	Bobby Wanzer (25)	2–2
5	November 13	N New York	91–94	Maurice Stokes (19)	2–3
6	November 19	Minneapolis	91–90	Art Spoelstra (17)	2–4
7	November 20	@ Minneapolis	104–96	Maurice Stokes (25)	3–4
8	November 23	@ St. Louis	88–90 (OT)	Don Meineke (16)	3–5
9	November 24	@ Fort Wayne	93–104	Connie Simmons (19)	3–6
10	November 26	Boston	104–103	Jack Twyman (28)	3–7
11	November 30	Fort Wayne	76–87	Jack Twyman (18)	4–7
12	December 3	St. Louis	89–78	Bobby Wanzer (19)	4–8
13	December 4	Philadelphia	84–107	Jack Twyman (25)	5–8
14	December 6	@ New York	105–116	Bobby Wanzer (22)	5–9
15	December 7	Minneapolis	79–92	Jack Twyman (18)	6–9
16	December 9	N Boston	109–108	Maurice Stokes (31)	7–9
17	December 10	Fort Wayne	116–117 (OT)	Jack Twyman (24)	8–9
18	December 11	St. Louis	91–93	Jack Twyman (20)	9–9
19	December 14	N St. Louis	109–117	Bobby Wanzer (24)	10–9
20	December 16	N St. Louis	100–97 (OT)	Jack Coleman (18)	10–10
21	December 17	@ Minneapolis	92–94	Jack Twyman (23)	10–11
22	December 18	@ St. Louis	85–86	Jack McMahon (28)	10–12
23	December 21	Philadelphia	96–92	Jack Coleman (20)	10–13
24	December 25	@ Syracuse	96–111	Jack Coleman (22)	10–14
25	December 26	Syracuse	91–93	Art Spoelstra (19)	11–14
26	December 27	N Syracuse	80–91	Bobby Wanzer (28)	12–14
27	December 28	New York	113–91	Jack Twyman (20)	12–15
28	December 29	@ Fort Wayne	75–83	Jack Twyman (19)	12–16
29	December 31	Boston	112–100	Ed Fleming (28)	12–17
30	January 1	@ New York	101–92	Maurice Stokes (28)	13–17
31	January 2	N Philadelphia	100–130	Ed Fleming (20)	13–18
32	January 4	Fort Wayne	88–86	Maurice Stokes (20)	13–19
33	January 7	Minneapolis	98–103	Jack Twyman (19)	14–19
34	January 8	@ Boston	111–109	Bobby Wanzer (22)	15–19
35	January 11	Philadelphia	97–94	Art Spoelstra (20)	15–20
36	January 12	@ Philadelphia	94–123	Ed Fleming (19)	15–21
37	January 13	N St. Louis	90–98	Maurice Stokes (24)	16–21
38	January 14	Syracuse	93–102	Spoelstra, Stokes (26)	17–21
39	January 15	@ Syracuse	88–99	Art Spoelstra (21)	17–22
40	January 17	@ New York	107–112	Jack Twyman (26)	17–23
41	January 18	New York	103–108	Ed Fleming (27)	18–23
42	January 21	N St. Louis	90–97	Ed Fleming (27)	19–23
43	January 22	@ Fort Wayne	93–111	Maurice Stokes (19)	19–24
44	January 25	@ St. Louis	106–114	Maurice Stokes (36)	19–25
45	January 27	N New York	111–93	Maurice Stokes (26)	20–25
46	January 28	Boston	126–119	Jack Twyman (40)	20–26
47	January 29	@ Boston	103–112	Maurice Stokes (18)	20–27
48	January 31	N Minneapolis	86–92	Maurice Stokes (15)	20–28
49	February 1	Syracuse	77–83	Jack Twyman (16)	21–28
50	February 2	@ Syracuse	89–97	Ed Fleming (23)	21–29
51	February 3	@ Philadelphia	105–96	Maurice Stokes (29)	22–29
52	February 4	Boston	69–83	Meineke, Spoelstra (18)	23–29
53	February 5	@ Minneapolis	121–109	Stokes, Twyman (28)	24–29
54	February 8	New York	102–97	Jack Twyman (19)	24–30
55	February 11	Fort Wayne	93–97	Maurice Stokes (24)	25–30
56	February 12	@ Syracuse	74–101	Ed Fleming (14)	25–31
57	February 14	N Minneapolis	79–110	Bobby Wanzer (19)	25–32
58	February 16	@ Fort Wayne	81–93	Ed Fleming (16)	25–33
59	February 18	Minneapolis	119–99	Maurice Stokes (22)	25–34
60	February 19	@ Minneapolis	93–100	Jack Twyman (14)	25–35
61	February 21	@ Fort Wayne	106–102	Maurice Stokes (22)	26–35
62	February 22	N St. Louis	109–110	Ed Fleming (32)	27–35
63	February 25	Fort Wayne	97–72	Jack Twyman (18)	27–36
64	February 26	@ Boston	100–111	Maurice Stokes (25)	27–37
65	February 28	N Boston	113–97	Ed Fleming (21)	28–37
66	February 29	@ Philadelphia	81–86	Dick Ricketts (20)	28–38
67	March 1	@ St. Louis	95–94	Maurice Stokes (24)	29–38
68	March 3	Minneapolis	90–94	Regan, Wanzer (16)	30–38
69	March 4	@ Fort Wayne	88–103	Regan, Twyman (16)	30–39
70	March 7	St. Louis	96–89	Maurice Stokes (21)	30–40
71	March 10	Philadelphia	96–111	Ed Fleming (25)	31–40
72	March 11	@ Minneapolis	98–126	Maurice Stokes (17)	31–41

== Player statistics ==
Legend
GP	Games played	GS	Games started	MPG	Minutes per game
FG%	Field-goal percentage	3P%	3-point field-goal percentage	FT%	Free-throw percentage
RPG	Rebounds per game	APG	Assists per game	SPG	Steals per game
BPG	Blocks per game	PPG	Points per game

Player	GP	GS	MPG	FG%	3FG%	FT%	RPG	APG	SPG	BPG	PPG
Jack Coleman											
Red Davis											
Ed Fleming											
Chris Harris											
Jack McMahon											
Monk Meineke											
Richie Regan											
Dick Ricketts											
Connie Simmons											
Art Spoelstra											
Maurice Stokes											
Jack Twyman											
Bobby Wanzer											

== Awards and records ==
- Maurice Stokes, NBA Rookie of the Year Award
- Maurice Stokes, All-NBA Second Team
