= 1957–58 Cincinnati Royals season =

NBA professional basketball team season

- Head coach: Bobby Wanzer
- Owners: Jack Harrison; Les Harrison
- Arena: Cincinnati Gardens

Results
- Record: 33–39 (.458)
- Place: Division: 3rd (Western)
- Playoff finish: West Division Semifinals (Eliminated 0–2)
- Stats at Basketball Reference

Local media
- Television: WKRC-TV
- Radio: WKRC

The 1957–58 season was the Royals first season in Cincinnati, following its relocation from Rochester during the offseason. Interest in the team was created by a draft deal that brought Lakers All-Star Clyde Lovellette to the team. The team then lured guard George King, the former Syracuse starter back from college coaching. Both additions added talent and veteran leadership to a still young squad.

The roster included star shooter Jack Twyman, Dick Ricketts (who also pitched in the major leagues), and star swing man Tom Marshall. In their first year in Cincinnati, the Royals ended a two-year playoff drought by finishing in third place after tie-breakers in the NBA's West Division. The Royals finished with a record of 33–39. One of the team leaders was Maurice Stokes, who finished second in rebounding with 18.1 rebounds per game. The 6'8 240-pound Stokes, arguably the NBA's first black superstar, also amazed by rating third in the NBA in assists.

Lovellette was fourth in the NBA in scoring, while Twyman led the NBA in shooting accuracy. Stokes and Twyman were named NBA All-Stars that first season. The team had the makings of a real contender, but the backcourt was debilitated by injuries to Marhsall and King, plus promising Si Green and Johnny McCarthy had been lost to mandatory military service. The team's first-year promise took a tragic turn in mid-March. In the final game of the regular season, played on March 12, Stokes suffered an injury when his head hit the hardwood floor in a game versus the Minneapolis Lakers. Despite being knocked unconscious, Stokes was to play in the playoffs against the Detroit Pistons. On the flight home after losing to the Pistons, Stokes suddenly fell ill and was rushed to the hospital upon landing. As the Pistons swept the Royals, Stokes lapsed into a coma. It was revealed that Stokes suffered encephalopathy, a traumatic brain injury that damaged his motor control center. The injury would leave Maurice Stokes as a quadriplegic without the ability to speak. Teammate Jack Twyman served as Stokes legal guardian until his death in 1970. The Stokes tragedy ultimately decimated the team, with six other players not returning for next season. The team was also suddenly sold to local Cincinnati buyers, and coach Bobby Wanzer was later replaced. This first year, therefore, stands out from all the Cincinnati teams.

== Draft picks ==
Round	Pick	Player	Position	Nationality	School/Club team
1	1	Rod Hundley		United States	West Virginia

The Royals made the deal of the NBA draft with the first overall pick. They selected high-touted Rod Hundley, and then sent him along with two reserves to the Lakers for All-Star Clyde Lovellette and solid reserve Jim Paxson, who had been a college star at nearby Dayton. The Royals then tried to shore up their backcourt with selections Dick Duckett (2), Gerry Paulson (3), John Maglio (6) and Chet Forte (7). Forte was later the Director of ABC's Monday Night Football. As the season ended, local stars Oscar Robertson and Jerry Lucas were tabbed as territorial draft picks. Each would be selected by the team after the college senior seasons.

== Regular season ==
=== Season standings ===
Western Division	W	L	PCT	GB	Home	Road	Neutral	Div
x-St. Louis Hawks	41	31	.569	-	23-8	8-19	10-4	24-12
x-Detroit Pistons	33	39	.458	8	14-14	13-17	6-8	18-18
x-Cincinnati Royals	33	39	.458	8	17-12	10-19	6-8	17-19
Minneapolis Lakers	19	53	.264	22	10-15	4-21	5-17	13-23

=== Game log ===
1957–58 Game log
#	Date	Opponent	Score	High points	Record
1	October 26	Syracuse	100–110	Jack Twyman (32)	1–0
2	November 1	St. Louis	92–99	Clyde Lovellette (26)	2–0
3	November 2	@ St. Louis	93–102	Stokes, Twyman (17)	2–1
4	November 3	Detroit	94–88	Regan, Stokes (15)	2–2
5	November 8	Boston	122–110 (OT)	Lovellette, Stokes (22)	2–3
6	November 10	Philadelphia	106–101	Jack Twyman (24)	2–4
7	November 15	New York	99–101	Clyde Lovellette (33)	3–4
8	November 17	St. Louis	98–97	Jack Twyman (23)	3–5
9	November 19	N Detroit	75–92	Clyde Lovellette (25)	4–5
10	November 20	@ Philadelphia	99–89	Clyde Lovellette (30)	5–5
11	November 22	@ Syracuse	102–98	Clyde Lovellette (30)	6–5
12	November 27	N Minneapolis	106–107	Clyde Lovellette (22)	7–5
13	November 28	@ St. Louis	96–112	Jack Twyman (19)	7–6
14	November 29	Detroit	96–99 (OT)	Maurice Stokes (20)	8–6
15	November 30	@ Detroit	96–100	Clyde Lovellette (30)	8–7
16	December 1	Minneapolis	89–90	Clyde Lovellette (23)	9–7
17	December 3	@ New York	104–110	Clyde Lovellette (27)	9–8
18	December 5	N Detroit	99–109	Maurice Stokes (22)	10–8
19	December 6	New York	112–97	Lovellette, Stokes (21)	10–9
20	December 7	@ Detroit	105–109	Clyde Lovellette (31)	10–10
21	December 8	Philadelphia	88–99	Jack Twyman (24)	11–10
22	December 10	N St. Louis	102–90	Clyde Lovellette (30)	11–11
23	December 11	@ Boston	104–116	Clyde Lovellette (26)	11–12
24	December 14	N Syracuse	104–100	Clyde Lovellette (31)	11–13
25	December 15	@ Syracuse	83–109	Clyde Lovellette (23)	11–14
26	December 20	Syracuse	122–113	Jack Twyman (26)	11–15
27	December 21	@ Detroit	101–112	Clyde Lovellette (28)	11–16
28	December 22	Boston	115–98	Lovellette, Twyman (26)	11–17
29	December 26	N Syracuse	104–100	Clyde Lovellette (32)	11–18
30	December 27	St. Louis	97–96	Jack Twyman (25)	11–19
31	December 28	@ Minneapolis	112–101	Jack Twyman (33)	12–19
32	December 29	Minneapolis	111–103	Jack Twyman (33)	12–20
33	December 31	Detroit	96–130	Jack Twyman (30)	13–20
34	January 3	Philadelphia	94–106	Jack Twyman (28)	14–20
35	January 5	@ New York	101–100	Maurice Stokes (27)	15–20
36	January 7	N Detroit	99–114	Jack Twyman (26)	16–20
37	January 8	N New York	123–105	Maurice Stokes (26)	16–21
38	January 10	New York	104–107	Clyde Lovellette (34)	17–21
39	January 11	Syracuse	100–105	Dick Ricketts (22)	18–21
40	January 12	Boston	97–115	Jack Twyman (26)	19–21
41	January 14	N New York	111–117	Jack Twyman (34)	20–21
42	January 16	Minneapolis	108–124	Clyde Lovellette (30)	21–21
43	January 17	@ Detroit	94–115	Clyde Lovellette (23)	21–22
44	January 19	@ St. Louis	90–108	Clyde Lovellette (26)	21–23
45	January 22	@ Syracuse	115–109	Clyde Lovellette (27)	22–23
46	January 24	Philadelphia	102–92	Jim Paxson (24)	22–24
47	January 26	Detroit	103–107	Clyde Lovellette (25)	23–24
48	January 30	@ Minneapolis	104–105	Jack Twyman (25)	23–25
49	January 31	St. Louis	92–100	Clyde Lovellette (25)	24–25
50	February 1	@ St. Louis	88–127	Piontek, Regan (16)	24–26
51	February 2	@ Minneapolis	95–106	Dave Piontek (21)	24–27
52	February 4	N Boston	87–107	Clyde Lovellette (20)	24–28
53	February 5	@ Boston	89–116	Clyde Lovellette (16)	24–29
54	February 7	@ Philadelphia	103–100	Clyde Lovellette (26)	25–29
55	February 8	N Boston	91–109	Maurice Stokes (25)	25–30
56	February 9	Minneapolis	104–121	Clyde Lovellette (34)	26–30
57	February 11	N Minneapolis	103–106	Maurice Stokes (23)	27–30
58	February 14	New York	103–92	Jack Twyman (22)	27–31
59	February 15	@ New York	97–99	Clyde Lovellette (24)	27–32
60	February 16	@ Syracuse	105–113	Clyde Lovellette (30)	27–33
61	February 20	@ Boston	92–94	Maurice Stokes (28)	27–34
62	February 21	Detroit	109–107	Jack Twyman (24)	27–35
63	February 22	@ Minneapolis	81–100	Dave Piontek (14)	27–36
64	February 23	Minneapolis	93–111	Clyde Lovellette (25)	28–36
65	February 26	N St. Louis	105–103	Clyde Lovellette (27)	28–37
66	March 1	@ Philadelphia	101–88	Clyde Lovellette (29)	29–37
67	March 2	@ St. Louis	93–103	Maurice Stokes (23)	29–38
68	March 4	N Philadelphia	97–91	Clyde Lovellette (29)	29–39
69	March 6	@ Philadelphia	110–108	Clyde Lovellette (37)	30–39
70	March 9	@ Boston	121–107	Jack Twyman (30)	31–39
71	March 10	St. Louis	84–122	Lovellette, Twyman (23)	32–39
72	March 12	@ Minneapolis	96–89	Maurice Stokes (24)	33–39

The first Cincinnati Royals game ever was a home game against Syracuse, 26 October 1957, a 110–100 win behind local star Jack Twyman. The team opened to good crowds with home games in their first ten. Nov 7–7, Dec 5–13 with injuries and extra road games, January 11–5, Feb 4–12 with a season-ending injury to Marshall, March 5–2, plus two playoff losses to Detroit, due to the permanent loss of Stokes.

== Playoffs ==
1958 playoff game log
Division Semifinals: 0–2 (home: 0–1; road: 0–1)

Game	Date	Team	Score	High points	Location	Series
1	March 15	@ Detroit	L 83–100	Clyde Lovellette (15)	Detroit Olympia	0–1
2	March 16	Detroit	L 104–124	Jack Twyman (24)	Cincinnati Gardens	0–2

1958 schedule

== Player statistics ==
Legend
GP	Games played	GS	Games started	MPG	Minutes per game
FG%	Field-goal percentage	3P%	3-point field-goal percentage	FT%	Free-throw percentage
RPG	Rebounds per game	APG	Assists per game	SPG	Steals per game
BPG	Blocks per game	PPG	Points per game

=== Season ===
Player	GP	GS	MPG	FG%	3FG%	FT%	RPG	APG	SPG	BPG	PPG
Dick Duckett											
George King											
Clyde Lovellette											
Tom Marshall											
Monk Meineke											
Jerry Paulson											
Jim Paxson											
Dave Piontek											
Richie Regan											
Dick Ricketts											
Maurice Stokes											
Jack Twyman											

=== Playoffs ===
Player	GP	GS	MPG	FG%	3FG%	FT%	RPG	APG	SPG	BPG	PPG
George King											
Clyde Lovellette											
Tom Marshall											
Monk Meineke											
Jim Paxson											
Dave Piontek											
Richie Regan											
Dick Ricketts											
Maurice Stokes											
Jack Twyman											

== Awards and honors ==
- Maurice Stokes, 2nd in rebounds, 3rd in assists, Second Team All-NBA.
- Clyde Lovellette, 1st in field goals made, 4th in scoring, 4th in shooting accuracy, Second Team All-NBA.
- Jack Twyman, 1st in shooting accuracy, NBA All-Star.
- George King, among top ten in NBA assists.
