= Jerry Paulson =

American basketball player

Personal information
- Born: July 21, 1935 New York City, New York, U.S.
- Died: March 6, 1986 (aged 50) Freehold Township, New Jersey, U.S.
- Listed height: 6 ft 2 in (1.88 m)
- Listed weight: 185 lb (84 kg)

Career information
- High school: Columbus (New York City, New York)
- College: Manhattan (1954–1957)
- NBA draft: 1957: 3rd round, 17th overall pick
- Drafted by: Cincinnati Royals
- Position: Guard
- Number: 15

Career history
- 1957: Cincinnati Royals
- Stats at NBA.com
- Stats at Basketball Reference

Gerald Arthur Paulson (July 21, 1935 – March 6, 1986) was an American professional basketball player. Paulson was selected in the 1957 NBA draft (third round, 17th pick overall) by the Cincinnati Royals after a collegiate career at Manhattan College. In college he was selected to play in the 1957 East-West All Star game, and was the Most Valuable Player in the 1957 ECAC Holiday Festival tournament. He appeared in six NBA games in his career and averaged 3.3 points, 1.7 rebounds and 0.7 assists per game.

== Career statistics ==
Legend
GP	Games played	GS	Games started	MPG	Minutes per game
FG%	Field goal percentage	3P%	3-point field goal percentage	FT%	Free throw percentage
RPG	Rebounds per game	APG	Assists per game	SPG	Steals per game
BPG	Blocks per game	PPG	Points per game	**Bold**	Career high

=== NBA ===
==== Regular season ====
Year	Team	GP	MPG	FG%	FT%	RPG	APG	PPG
1957–58	Cincinnati	6	11.3	.348	.667	1.7	.7	3.3
