= Richie Regan =

American basketball player and coach

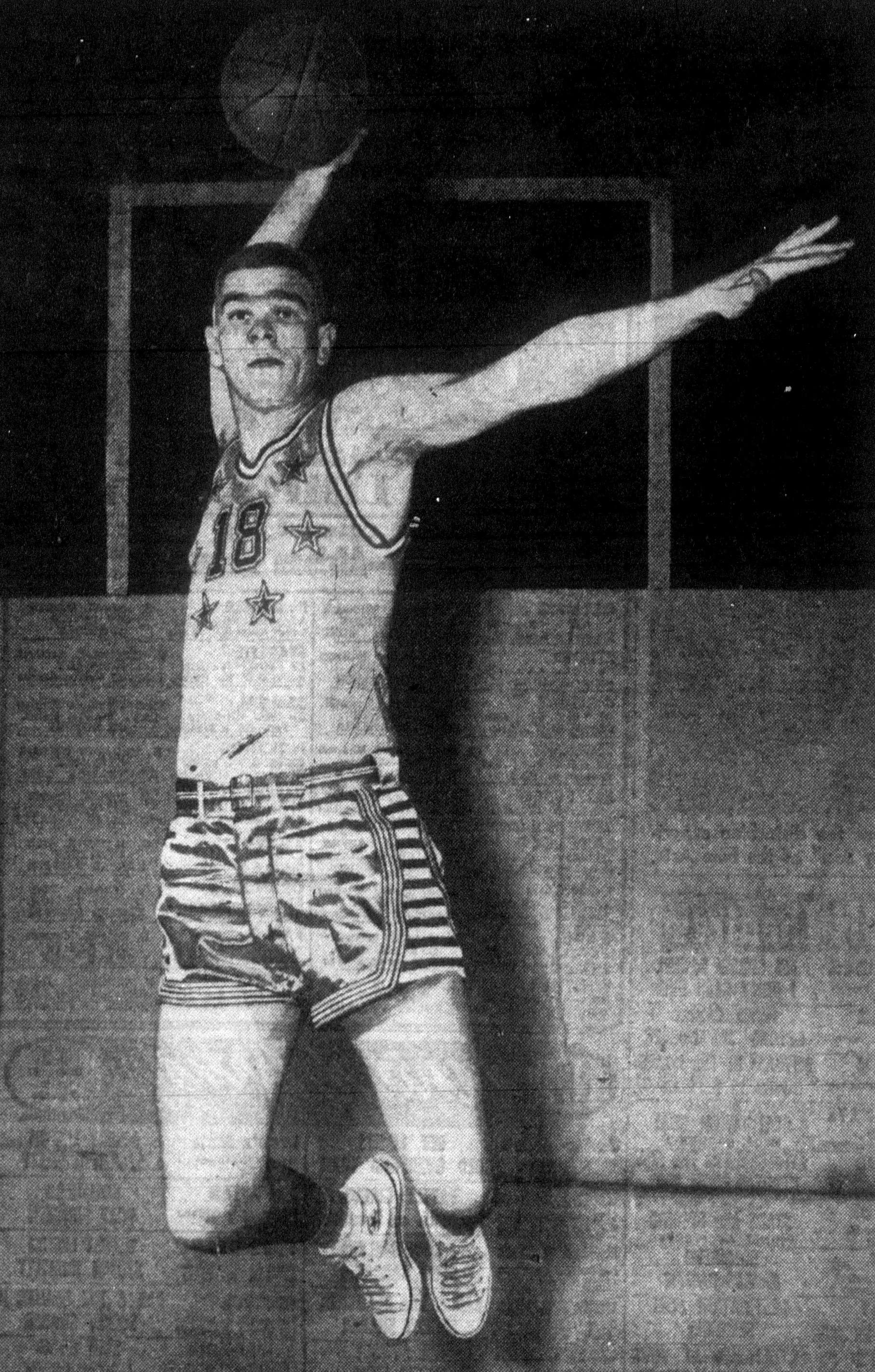
- Regan, circa 1953

Personal information
- Born: November 30, 1930 Newark, New Jersey, U.S.
- Died: December 24, 2002 (aged 72) Neptune, New Jersey, U.S.
- Listed height: 6 ft 2 in (1.88 m)
- Listed weight: 180 lb (82 kg)

Career information
- High school: West Side (Newark, New Jersey)
- College: Seton Hall (1950–1953)
- NBA draft: 1953: 1st round, 4th overall pick
- Drafted by: Rochester Royals
- Playing career: 1955–1959
- Position: Point guard / shooting guard
- Number: 14

Career history
- 1955–1958: Rochester / Cincinnati Royals
- 1958–1959: Baltimore Bullets

Career highlights
- NBA All-Star (1957); No. 12 retired by Seton Hall Pirates

Career NBA statistics
- Points: 1,785 (8.3 ppg)
- Rebounds: 554 (2.6 rpg)
- Assists: 629 (2.9 apg)
- Stats at NBA.com
- Stats at Basketball Reference

Richard Joseph Regan (November 30, 1930 – December 24, 2002) was an American basketball player and coach who played in the NBA for the Rochester / Cincinnati Royals

Raised in Newark, New Jersey, Regan played prep basketball at West Side High School.

The 6-foot-2-inch (1.88 m) Regan played collegiately at Seton Hall University during the early 1950s. His team made three consecutive appearances in the National Invitation Tournament, winning in 1953. After graduation, he was selected by the Rochester Royals with the fifth pick of the 1953 NBA draft. After two years serving in the United States Marine Corps, Regan played three seasons with the Royals and averaged 8.3 points per game. He appeared in the 1957 NBA All-Star Game.

Regan later served as a basketball coach and athletic director at Seton Hall.

A resident of Sea Girt, New Jersey, Regan died of heart failure at the age of 72.

== NBA career statistics ==
Legend
| GP | Games played | GS | Games started | MPG | Minutes per game |
| FG% | Field goal percentage | 3P% | 3-point field goal percentage | FT% | Free throw percentage |
| RPG | Rebounds per game | APG | Assists per game | SPG | Steals per game |
| BPG | Blocks per game | PPG | Points per game | **Bold** | Career high |

=== Regular season ===
| Year | Team | GP | MPG | FG% | FT% | RPG | APG | PPG |
|---|---|---|---|---|---|---|---|---|
| 1955–56 | Rochester | **72** | 24.3 | .352 | .639 | 2.4 | **3.1** | 7.8 |
| 1956–57 | Rochester | 71 | **29.6** | .329 | **.774** | **2.9** | **3.1** | **9.8** |
| 1957–58 | Cincinnati | **72** | 22.9 | **.355** | .698 | 2.4 | 2.6 | 7.3 |
| Career | | 215 | 25.6 | .344 | .717 | 2.6 | 2.9 | 8.3 |

=== Playoffs ===
| Year | Team | GP | MPG | FG% | FT% | RPG | APG | PPG |
|---|---|---|---|---|---|---|---|---|
| 1958 | Cincinnati | 2 | 31.5 | .462 | .000 | 4.5 | 1.5 | 12.0 |
| Career | | 2 | 31.5 | .462 | .000 | 4.5 | 1.5 | 12.0 |
