= Dave Piontek =

American basketball player

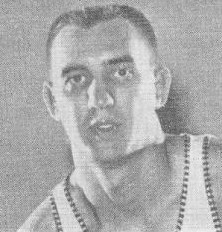

Personal information
- Born: August 27, 1934 Bethel Park, Pennsylvania, U.S.
- Died: May 12, 2004 (aged 69) Scottsdale, Arizona, U.S.
- Listed height: 6 ft 6 in (1.98 m)
- Listed weight: 230 lb (104 kg)

Career information
- High school: Bethel Park (Bethel Park, Pennsylvania)
- College: Xavier (1953–1956)
- NBA draft: 1956: 3rd round, 16th overall pick
- Drafted by: Rochester Royals
- Playing career: 1956–1963
- Position: Power forward / center
- Number: 5, 25, 12, 33, 61

Career history
- 1956–1960: Rochester / Cincinnati Royals
- 1960–1961: St. Louis Hawks
- 1961–1962: Chicago Packers
- 1962–1963: Cincinnati Royals

Career NBA statistics
- Points: 2,955 (7.2 ppg)
- Rebounds: 1,770 (4.3 rpg)
- Assists: 478 (1.2 apg)
- Stats at NBA.com
- Stats at Basketball Reference

David Vincent Piontek (August 27, 1934 – May 12, 2004) was an American professional basketball player.

A 6'6" forward, Piontek played seven seasons (1956–1963) in the National Basketball Association (NBA) as a member of the Rochester / Cincinnati Royals, St. Louis Hawks, and Chicago Packers. He averaged 7.2 points per game in his NBA career. He went to college at Xavier University and high school in Bethel Park, Pennsylvania.

== Career statistics ==
Legend
| GP | Games played | GS | Games started | MPG | Minutes per game |
| FG% | Field goal percentage | 3P% | 3-point field goal percentage | FT% | Free throw percentage |
| RPG | Rebounds per game | APG | Assists per game | SPG | Steals per game |
| BPG | Blocks per game | PPG | Points per game | **Bold** | Career high |
| * | Led the league |

=== NBA ===
==== Regular season ====
| Year | Team | GP | MPG | FG% | FT% | RPG | APG | PPG |
|---|---|---|---|---|---|---|---|---|
| 1956–57 | Rochester | 71 | 24.8 | .403 | .667 | 4.9 | 1.5 | 9.0 |
| 1957–58 | Cincinnati | 71 | 14.5 | .378 | .629 | 3.6 | .7 | 5.6 |
| 1958–59 | Cincinnati | 72* | 23.3 | .375 | .687 | 5.3 | **1.7** | **10.6** |
| 1959–60 | Cincinnati | **52*** | 21.4 | .409 | **.689** | **6.6** | 1.6 | 10.0 |
| 1959–60 | St. Louis | **25*** | **28.9** | .381 | .563 | 4.8 | 1.4 | 7.8 |
| 1960–61 | St. Louis | 29 | 8.8 | **.490** | .516 | 2.3 | .7 | 3.8 |
| 1961–62 | Chicago | 45 | 13.6 | .369 | .661 | 3.4 | .7 | 4.6 |
| 1962–63 | Cincinnati | 48 | 9.5 | .380 | .625 | 2.0 | .5 | 2.7 |
| Career | | 413 | 18.5 | .391 | .652 | 4.3 | 1.2 | 7.2 |

==== Playoffs ====
| Year | Team | GP | MPG | FG% | FT% | RPG | APG | PPG |
|---|---|---|---|---|---|---|---|---|
| 1958 | Cincinnati | 2 | 13.5 | .400 | .400 | **5.0** | .0 | 5.0 |
| 1960 | St. Louis | **14*** | **15.7** | .342 | **.720** | 2.9 | **1.3** | **5.1** |
| 1961 | St. Louis | 1 | 10.0 | .143 | – | 3.0 | 1.0 | 2.0 |
| 1963 | Cincinnati | 8 | 8.5 | **.471** | .571 | 2.0 | .1 | 2.5 |
| Career | | 25 | 13.0 | .354 | .649 | 2.8 | .8 | 4.2 |
