= Jack Twyman =

American basketball player (1934 – 2012)

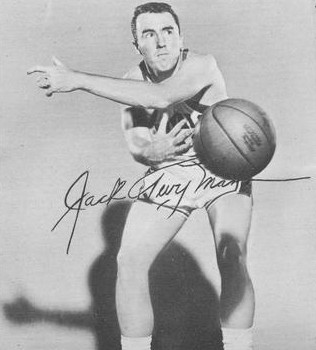

Personal information
- Born: May 21, 1934 Pittsburgh, Pennsylvania, U.S.
- Died: May 30, 2012 (aged 78) Cincinnati, Ohio, U.S.
- Listed height: 6 ft 6 in (1.98 m)
- Listed weight: 210 lb (95 kg)

Career information
- High school: Central Catholic (Pittsburgh, Pennsylvania)
- College: Cincinnati (1951–1955)
- NBA draft: 1955: 2nd round, 8th overall pick
- Drafted by: Rochester Royals
- Playing career: 1955–1966
- Position: Small forward
- Number: 10, 27, 31

Career history
- 1955–1966: Rochester / Cincinnati Royals

Career highlights
- 6× NBA All-Star (1957–1960, 1962, 1963); 2× All-NBA Second Team (1960, 1962); No. 27 retired by Sacramento Kings; Second-team All-American – NEA, INS (1955); No. 27 retired by Cincinnati Bearcats

Career statistics
- Points: 15,840 (19.2 ppg)
- Rebounds: 5,424 (6.6 rpg)
- Assists: 1,861 (2.3 apg)
- Stats at NBA.com
- Stats at Basketball Reference
- Basketball Hall of Fame
- Collegiate Basketball Hall of Fame

John Kennedy Twyman (May 21, 1934 – May 30, 2012) was an American professional basketball player and sports broadcaster. During his career, he was a caregiver for his disabled teammate Maurice Stokes and both are the namesakes of the NBA's Twyman–Stokes Teammate of the Year Award. Twyman was inducted into the Naismith Basketball Hall of Fame in 1983.

== Early life ==
Twyman was born and raised in Pittsburgh, Pennsylvania, where he attended Central Catholic High School (which also produced Pro Football Hall of Fame Quarterback Dan Marino). After being cut three times from his high school team, Twyman practiced every day, shooting 100 foul shots and 200 jump shots and 100 to 150 set shots. Twyman then made the Central Catholic team as a senior, earning All-State honors.

== College career ==
After graduating from Central Catholic High School, Twyman attended the University of Cincinnati, where he received his degree in elementary education and averaged 24.6 points and 16.5 rebounds in his Bearcat career. He led Cincinnati to 3rd place in the 1955 National Invitation Tournament.

Twyman's #27 was retired by the University of Cincinnati.

== Professional career ==
Twyman, a 6'6" forward, spent eleven seasons in the NBA. His entire career was spent as a member of the Rochester/Cincinnati Royals, who later became the Sacramento Kings.

Twyman and Wilt Chamberlain became the first players in NBA history to average more than 30 points per game in a single season when they both accomplished that feat during the 1959–60 season. Twyman opened the 1959–60 season by scoring more than 30 points in his first seven games, and scored his career-high 59 points in a game that same season.

Beginning with the 1958–1959 season, Twyman averaged 25.8, 31.2, 25.3 and 22.9 points per game over those four seasons.

Twyman was named to the All-NBA Second Team in both 1960 and 1962, and appeared in six NBA All-Star Games.

Twyman scored 15,840 points in his career which ranked 20th on the NBA's all-time scoring list at the time of his retirement. He averaged 19.3 points and 8.7 rebounds over eleven seasons and 823 games. He averaged 18.3 points and 7.5 rebounds in the playoffs.

Twyman's # 27 is retired by the Sacramento Kings.

Twyman was inducted into the Naismith Memorial Basketball Hall of Fame in 1983.

== Broadcasting career ==
In the late 1960s and early 1970s, Twyman worked alongside Chris Schenkel as an analyst/color commentator for The NBA on ABC.

Twyman made a call during game 7 of the 1970 NBA Finals between the New York Knicks and the Los Angeles Lakers. During the pre-game segment with Schenkel, Twyman noticed Knicks' injured center Willis Reed (whose status for the clincher had been doubtful) advancing from the tunnel toward the court. Twyman then exclaimed: "I think we see Willis coming out!" The sight of Reed marching toward the basketball floor helped inspire the Knicks to a 113–99 victory – one that gave New York its first NBA league title.

== Maurice Stokes ==
Twyman became the legal guardian of his teammate and friend Maurice Stokes, a Hall of Fame player who was paralyzed due to a head injury he suffered after a fall during a game.

In the last game of the 1958 regular season, Stokes was knocked down on a play and hit his head on the floor, which rendered him unconscious. The injury manifested itself in the upcoming days, leaving Stokes permanently paralyzed after having seizures. Stokes had finished playing in the game in which he was injured and knocked unconscious.

Stokes then played in the playoff game three days later. He became violently ill after the game and teammates Dick Ricketts and Twyman were assisting him. "I feel like I'm going to die," he was saying. He then had a major seizure on the team flight and was rushed to the hospital upon landing. Stokes was cared for at Good Samaritan Hospital in Cincinnati, where Twyman and his family were regular visitors. At age 23, Twyman became Stokes' legal guardian and provided support and care for Stokes for the rest of his life.

To help with Stokes' ongoing medical finances, Twyman organized the "Maurice Stokes Memorial Basketball Game" to raise funds for Stokes' daily care needs. Eventually the game grew to assist other former players who were in need. The game became a decades long annual event, attracting many of the top players in the NBA, and was later replaced by a pro-am golf tournament.

Twyman helped Stokes to obtain workers compensation and taught him to communicate by blinking his eyes to denote individual letters. Later, when Stokes had worked to be able to type, his first message was: “Dear Jack, How can I ever thank you?”

Twyman remained Stokes' legal guardian, friend and advocate. Stokes died in 1970.

Stokes' life, injury, and relationship with Twyman inspired the 1973 film Maurie.

When Maurice Stokes was elected to the Naismith Basketball Hall of Fame in 2004, Twyman spoke and accepted on Stokes' behalf.

On June 9, 2013, the NBA announced that both Twyman and Maurice Stokes would be honored with an annual award in their names, the Twyman–Stokes Teammate of the Year Award, which recognizes the player that embodies the league's ideal teammate that season.

== Personal life ==
Twyman later became a food company executive (Super Food Services, Dayton, Ohio), and made more than $3 million when he sold the company in 1996.

In 2004, when the Basketball Hall of Fame inducted Maurice Stokes, Twyman accepted the honor on his behalf. Earlier, Twyman said of his care of Maurice Stokes, simply, ”That’s what friends are for.” He added, ”He (Maurice) taught us a lot. We learned a lot from him, we’re honored to have had the opportunity to be associated with him.”

Twyman died on May 31, 2012, in Cincinnati from complications of blood cancer. Twyman was survived by his wife of 57 years Carole, his son, Jay; three daughters, Julie, Lisa and Michele; and 14 grandchildren.

== Honors ==
- Twyman's # 27 was retired by the Sacramento Kings.
- Twyman's #27 was retired by the University of Cincinnati.
- Twyman is a namesake of the NBA's Twyman–Stokes Teammate of the Year Award.
- Twyman is the namesake of the Jack Twyman Award for Service Learning at the University of Cincinnati.
- Twyman was inducted into the Central Catholic High School Hall of Fame.
- In 1976, Twyman was inducted as a charter member of the University of Cincinnati James P. Kelly Athletics Hall Of Fame.
- Twyman was inducted into the Naismith Memorial Basketball Hall of Fame in 1983.
- In 2006, Twyman was inducted as a charter member into the Ohio Basketball Hall of Fame.

== NBA career statistics ==
Legend
GP	Games played	GS	Games started	MPG	Minutes per game
FG%	Field goal percentage	3P%	3-point field goal percentage	FT%	Free throw percentage
RPG	Rebounds per game	APG	Assists per game	SPG	Steals per game
BPG	Blocks per game	PPG	Points per game	**Bold**	Career high
*	Led the league

=== Regular season ===
Year	Team	GP	MPG	FG%	FT%	RPG	APG	PPG
1955–56	Rochester	72	30.4	.422	.685	6.5	2.4	14.4
1956–57	Rochester	72	32.5	.439	.760	4.9	1.7	16.3
1957–58	Cincinnati	72	30.3	.452*	.775	6.4	1.5	17.2
1958–59	Cincinnati	72	37.7	.420	.783	**9.1**	2.9	25.8
1959–60	Cincinnati	75	**40.3**	.422	.785	8.9	**3.5**	**31.2**
1960–61	Cincinnati	79	37.0	**.488**	.731	8.5	2.8	25.3
1961–62	Cincinnati	**80**	37.4	.479	.811	8.0	2.7	22.9
1962–63	Cincinnati	**80**	32.8	.480	.811	7.5	2.7	19.8
1963–64	Cincinnati	68	29.4	.450	**.829**	5.4	2.0	15.9
1964–65	Cincinnati	**80**	28.0	.443	.828	4.8	1.7	14.5
1965–66	Cincinnati	73	12.9	.450	.812	2.3	0.8	7.4
Career		823	31.8	.450	.778	6.6	2.3	19.2
All-Star		6	19.5	.559	.650	3.5	1.3	14.8

=== Playoffs ===
Year	Team	GP	MPG	FG%	FT%	RPG	APG	PPG
1958	Cincinnati	2	37.0	.333	.583	**11.0**	0.5	18.5
1962	Cincinnati	4	**37.3**	.436	**1.000**	7.3	**3.0**	19.0
1963	Cincinnati	**12**	34.2	.449	.844	8.2	2.5	**20.8**
1964	Cincinnati	10	35.4	.472	.796	8.7	1.6	20.5
1965	Cincinnati	4	24.3	.396	**1.000**	4.3	0.8	12.3
1966	Cincinnati	2	5.5	**.500**	.500	1.0	0.0	2.5
Career		34	32.2	.441	.824	7.5	1.8	18.3
