= Dick Duckett =

American basketball player (1933–2021)

Personal information
- Born: March 25, 1933 Brooklyn, New York, U.S.
- Died: March 10, 2021 (aged 87) Naples, Florida, U.S.
- Listed height: 6 ft 1 in (1.85 m)
- Listed weight: 185 lb (84 kg)

Career information
- High school: St. Francis Prep (Queens, New York)
- College: St. John's (1951–1953, 1955–1957)
- NBA draft: 1957: 2nd round, 9th overall pick
- Drafted by: Cincinnati Royals
- Position: Point guard
- Number: 10

Career history
- 1957–1958: Cincinnati Royals
- 1960–1962: Hazelton Hawks
- Stats at NBA.com
- Stats at Basketball Reference

Richard J. Duckett (March 25, 1933 – March 10, 2021) was an American professional basketball player. Duckett was selected in the 1957 NBA draft (second round, ninth overall) by the Cincinnati Royals after a collegiate career at St. John's. He played for the Royals for one season followed by two years playing in the Eastern Professional Basketball League for the Hazelton Hawks.

== Career statistics ==
Legend
GP	Games played	GS	Games started	MPG	Minutes per game
FG%	Field goal percentage	3P%	3-point field goal percentage	FT%	Free throw percentage
RPG	Rebounds per game	APG	Assists per game	SPG	Steals per game
BPG	Blocks per game	PPG	Points per game	**Bold**	Career high

=== NBA ===
==== Regular season ====
Year	Team	GP	MPG	FG%	FT%	RPG	APG	PPG
1957–58	Cincinnati	34	12.5	.342	.889	1.6	1.4	3.9
