= Dick Ricketts =

American baseball and basketball player (1933–1988)

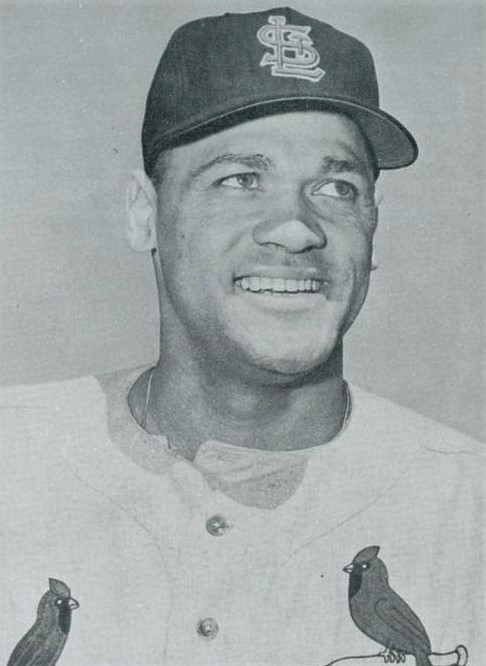

Personal information
- Born: December 4, 1933 Pottstown, Pennsylvania, U.S.
- Died: March 6, 1988 (aged 54) Rochester, New York, U.S.
- Listed height: 6 ft 7 in (2.01 m)
- Listed weight: 215 lb (98 kg)

Career information
- High school: Pottstown (Pottstown, Pennsylvania)
- College: Duquesne (1951–1955)
- NBA draft: 1955: 1st round, 1st overall pick
- Drafted by: St. Louis Hawks
- Playing career: 1955–1958
- Position: Power forward / center
- Number: 12, 15, 24

Career history
- 1955–1956: St. Louis Hawks
- 1956–1958: Rochester / Cincinnati Royals

Career highlights
- Consensus first-team All-American (1955); Consensus second-team All-American (1954); Third-team All-American – NEA (1953); No. 12 retired by Duquesne Dukes

Career NBA statistics
- Points: 1,974 (9.3 ppg)
- Rebounds: 1,337 (6.3 rpg)
- Assists: 447 (2.1 apg) Baseball career
- Pitcher
- Batted: left Threw: right

MLB debut
- June 14, 1959, for the St. Louis Cardinals

Last MLB appearance
- July 27, 1959, for the St. Louis Cardinals

MLB statistics
- Win–loss record: 1–6
- Earned run average: 5.82
- Strikeouts: 25
- Stats at Baseball Reference

Teams
- St. Louis Cardinals (1959)
- Stats at NBA.com
- Stats at Basketball Reference

Richard James Ricketts Jr. (December 4, 1933 – March 6, 1988) was an American professional basketball and baseball player. Ricketts was the No. 1 overall pick of the 1955 NBA draft by the St. Louis Hawks out of Duquesne University. Ricketts played professional basketball and baseball simultaneously and retired from basketball to play baseball. He pitched for the St. Louis Cardinals in 1959 and had a 10-season pitching career. He is one of 13 athletes to play in both the NBA and MLB.

== Early life ==
Dick Ricketts graduated from Pottstown High School in Pottstown, Pennsylvania, and was the son of Richard and Margaret Ricketts. He had a sister, Alice, and a brother, Dave.

A multi-sport athlete, Dick played alongside his younger brother Dave. The brothers Dick and Dave Ricketts and future Philadelphia Phillies player Howie Bedell played on the Pottstown baseball team that won 48 games in a row. A plaque honoring that team is displayed at the National Baseball Hall of Fame, according to Mercury archives.

== College basketball career ==
A 6'7" forward, Ricketts attended Duquesne University. There, Ricketts became an All-American and played alongside Sihugo Green. Green was the No. 1 overall pick of the 1956 NBA draft. The tandem led Duquesne as the Dukes went 26–3 in 1954–1955 under Coach Dudey Moore, losing in the Final of the 1954 National Invitation Tournament.

In 1954–1955, Ricketts averaged 20.1 points and 17.3 rebounds in his senior season as the Duquesne finished 22–4, and won the 1955 National Invitation Tournament. On March 20, 1955, Duquesne beat the Dayton Flyers 70–58 before a sellout crowd of 18,496 at Madison Square Garden in the Final, as Green had 33 points and Ricketts had 23. Ricketts' brother Dave Ricketts was also on the team.

For his career at Duquesne, Ricketts averaged 17.7 points and 12.2 rebounds in 111 games over his four seasons.

Ricketts was then selected by the St. Louis Hawks with the first pick of the 1955 NBA draft. He would play three seasons in the NBA with the Hawks and the Rochester / Cincinnati Royals, scoring 1,974 career points.

== NBA career (1955–1958) ==
Drafted #1 overall by the NBA St. Louis Hawks, he was also under contract with the major-league baseball St. Louis Cardinals. In 1955–1956, he began the season with the Hawks, averaging 8.4 points and 6.8 rebounds through 29 games of his rookie season. But, because he was going to be pitching that season for the baseball Rochester Red Wings, Ricketts arranged for the Hawks to sell his basketball contract to the Rochester Royals. He averaged 9.4 points and 7.5 rebounds for Rochester after changing teams.

In the 1956–1957 season, Ricketts had his best basketball season for Rochester, averaging 11.2 points and 6.1 rebounds in 72 games. He was also reunited with his college teammate Sihugo Green, who had been the number one pick of the 1956 NBA draft.

In 1957–1958, Rochester had moved to Cincinnati and the Royals' Ricketts averaged 7.8 points and 5.7 rebounds playing alongside Naismith Basketball Hall of Fame inductees Clyde Lovellette, Maurice Stokes and Jack Twyman.

Ricketts was deeply affected by the tragic injury of teammate Maurice Stokes in March, 1958. He immediately retired from pro basketball following that season to become a full-time baseball pitcher. Stokes hit his head on the floor in the last game of the regular season, and the injury manifested itself in the upcoming days, leaving Stokes permanently paralyzed. Stokes finished playing in the game in which he was injured and knocked unconscious. He then played in a playoff game three days later. He became ill after the game and Ricketts and Twyman were assisting him to help him get on the team plane. "I feel like I'm going to die," he was saying to Ricketts. He then had a seizure on the flight.

Twyman became his legal guardian and helped Stokes for the remainder of his life. Stokes died in 1970.

== Baseball career (1955–1964) ==
Ricketts signed as an amateur free agent pitcher by the St. Louis Cardinals in 1955 and pitched 10 seasons professionally, from 1955 to 1964. Ricketts pitched for the Allentown Cardinals (A) (1955–1956), the Rochester Red Wings (AAA) (1957–1960).

In 1959, Ricketts pitched in 12 games for the St. Louis Cardinals, including 9 starts. He had a 1–6 record, with a 5.82 ERA in 55 2/3 innings.

On June 14, 1959, Ricketts debuted against the Cincinnati Reds. He was the starting pitcher and pitched 7 innings, allowing 3 runs, in a 3–2 loss. In his next start against the Pittsburgh Pirates on June 19, he pitched 7 innings, allowing 2 runs. He won his only game on June 28, pitching 6 2/3 innings against the Reds for the victory. In his last start against the San Francisco Giants on July 22, Ricketts pitched 6 innings, allowing 3 runs. He gave up 7 runs in two subsequent relief appearances.

On September 20, 1960, the St. Louis Cardinals sent Ricketts, Jim Frey, Billy Harrell and Wally Shannon to the Philadelphia Phillies to complete a deal made on September 19, 1960, when the Cardinals sent players to be named later and Bob Sadowski to the Phillies for Don Landrum.

Ricketts then pitched for the Phillies' Buffalo Bisons (AAA) team from 1961 to 1964. His overall minor league record was 99–91 with a 3.70 ERA in 301 games and 1597 innings pitched.

== NBA and MLB ==
Ricketts is one of 13 athletes to play in both the National Basketball Association and Major League Baseball. The 13 are: Danny Ainge, Frank Baumholtz, Hank Biasatti, Gene Conley, Chuck Connors, Dave DeBusschere, Dick Groat, Steve Hamilton, Mark Hendrickson, Cotton Nash, Ron Reed, Ricketts and Howie Schultz.

== NBA career statistics ==
Legend
GP	Games played	GS	Games started	MPG	Minutes per game
FG%	Field goal percentage	3P%	3-point field goal percentage	FT%	Free throw percentage
RPG	Rebounds per game	APG	Assists per game	SPG	Steals per game
BPG	Blocks per game	PPG	Points per game	**Bold**	Career high
*	Led the league

=== Regular season ===
Year	Team	GP	MPG	FG%	FT%	RPG	APG	PPG
1955–56	St. Louis	29	26.8	.312	.705	6.8	**3.0**	8.4
1955–56	Rochester	39	**29.9**	.313	**.709**	**7.5**	2.8	9.4
1956–57	Rochester	**72***	29.4	**.344**	.694	6.1	1.8	**11.2**
1957–58	Cincinnati	**72***	22.5	.324	.673	5.7	1.6	7.8
Career		212	26.8	.328	.692	6.3	2.1	9.3

=== Playoffs ===
Year	Team	GP	MPG	FG%	FT%	RPG	APG	PPG
1958	Cincinnati	2	15.5	.333	1.000	5.0	1.0	7.5
Career		2	15.5	.333	1.000	5.0	1.0	7.5

== Personal ==
- Dick Ricketts' brother Dave Ricketts, was also a 2-sport athlete. A catcher in baseball, Dave played alongside his brother at Duquesne. Dave spent six years in the major leagues and was a longtime coach (1974–75; 1978–91) for the St. Louis Cardinals.
- Besides playing together at Duquesne, the Ricketts' brothers played baseball together, with Dick pitching to Dave. They were teammates in the minor leagues at 1957 AAA Rochester (Dick 12-9/Dave .306)
- Ricketts died in Rochester, New York, on March 6, 1988, after a lengthy battle with leukemia.

== Honors ==
- Ricketts was named to the Duquesne University All-Century Team in 2016.
- Ricketts' #12 jersey is retired by Duquesne University Basketball.
- Ricketts is honored (2015) in the "Frontier Field Walk of Fame" at Frontier Field in Rochester, New York.
