= Jim Paxson Sr. =

American basketball player

Personal information
- Born: December 19, 1932 Pennville, Indiana, U.S.
- Died: October 28, 2014 (aged 81) Dayton, Ohio, U.S.
- Listed height: 6 ft 6 in (1.98 m)
- Listed weight: 200 lb (91 kg)

Career information
- High school: Catholic Central (Springfield, Ohio)
- College: Dayton (1951–1953, 1955–1956)
- NBA draft: 1956: 1st round, 3rd overall pick
- Drafted by: Minneapolis Lakers
- Playing career: 1956–1958
- Position: Shooting guard / small forward
- Number: 11

Career history
- 1956–1957: Minneapolis Lakers
- 1957–1958: Cincinnati Royals

Career NBA statistics
- Points: 1,105 (8.0 ppg)
- Rebounds: 616 (4.5 rpg)
- Assists: 225 (1.6 apg)
- Stats at NBA.com
- Stats at Basketball Reference
Medals
Representing United States
Men's basketball
Pan American Games
Gold medal – first place	1955 Mexico City	Team competition

James Edward Paxson Sr. (December 19, 1932 – October 28, 2014) was an American professional basketball player.

A 6'6" swingman, Paxson attended the University of Dayton during the mid-1950s, averaging 10.9 points per game in his collegiate career. He helped the Flyers attain two consecutive second-place finishes in the National Invitation Tournament. After his sophomore year, Paxson Sr. was drafted into the Army during the Korean War. He spent two years in the Army and played with the Armed Forced All-Stars who won the Pan-Am games in Mexico in 1955 before returning for his final season in 1955–56. He averaged 15.5 points per game as a senior as the Flyers went 25-4 and lost to Louisville in the NIT championship game. [6] After graduating in 1956, he was selected by the Minneapolis Lakers with the third pick of the NBA draft, then played two seasons in the NBA with the Lakers and Cincinnati Royals. When his basketball career ended, he entered the insurance business.

Paxson's sons Jim and John both played in the NBA and have also served as NBA general managers. His son Michael played collegiately at Ohio University for one year.

Paxson died on October 28, 2014. He was 81.

== Career statistics ==
Legend
GP	Games played	GS	Games started	MPG	Minutes per game
FG%	Field goal percentage	3P%	3-point field goal percentage	FT%	Free throw percentage
RPG	Rebounds per game	APG	Assists per game	SPG	Steals per game
BPG	Blocks per game	PPG	Points per game	**Bold**	Career high

=== NBA ===
==== Regular season ====
Year	Team	GP	MPG	FG%	FT%	RPG	APG	PPG
1956–57	Minneapolis	**71**	17.9	.285	.720	3.7	1.2	6.3
1957–58	Cincinnati	67	**26.8**	**.352**	**.733**	**5.2**	**2.1**	**9.8**
Career		138	22.2	.323	.727	4.5	1.6	8.0

==== Playoffs ====
Year	Team	GP	MPG	FG%	FT%	RPG	APG	PPG
1956–57	Minneapolis	**5**	10.8	**.333**	.500	2.8	.6	5.0
1957–58	Cincinnati	2	**15.0**	.150	**.750**	**4.0**	**2.5**	**6.0**
Career		7	12.0	.255	.591	3.1	1.1	5.3
