= Maurice Stokes =

American basketball player (1933–1970)

Personal information
- Born: June 17, 1933 Rankin, Pennsylvania, U.S.
- Died: April 6, 1970 (aged 36) Cincinnati, Ohio, U.S.
- Listed height: 6 ft 7 in (2.01 m)
- Listed weight: 232 lb (105 kg)

Career information
- High school: Westinghouse (Pittsburgh, Pennsylvania)
- College: Saint Francis (PA) (1951–1955)
- NBA draft: 1955: 1st round, 2nd overall pick
- Drafted by: Rochester Royals
- Playing career: 1955–1958
- Position: Power forward / center
- Number: 12

Career history
- 1955–1958: Rochester / Cincinnati Royals

Career highlights
- 3× NBA All-Star (1956–1958); 3× All-NBA Second Team (1956–1958); NBA Rookie of the Year (1956); NBA rebounding leader (1957); No. 12 retired by Sacramento Kings; First-team All-American – Look (1955); Second-team All-American – NEA (1955); Third-team All-American – AP, UPI, Collier's (1955); No. 26 retired by Saint Francis Red Flash

Career statistics
- Points: 3,315 (16.4 ppg)
- Rebounds: 3,492 (17.3 rpg)
- Assists: 1,062 (5.3 apg)
- Stats at NBA.com
- Stats at Basketball Reference
- Basketball Hall of Fame
- Collegiate Basketball Hall of Fame

Maurice Stokes (June 17, 1933 – April 6, 1970) was an American professional basketball player. He played for the Cincinnati/Rochester Royals of the National Basketball Association (NBA) from 1955 to 1958. Stokes was a three-time NBA All-Star, a three-time All-NBA Second Team member and the 1956 NBA Rookie of the Year. His career – and later his life – was cut short by a debilitating brain injury and paralysis.

Stokes is a namesake of the NBA's Twyman–Stokes Teammate of the Year Award alongside Jack Twyman, who served as Stokes's legal guardian during the final years of his life. Stokes was inducted into the Naismith Basketball Hall of Fame in 2004.

== Early life ==
Born in Rankin, Pennsylvania, near Pittsburgh, Stokes was one of four children — he had a twin sister and two brothers. His father worked in a steel mill and his mother was a domestic. When Maurice was age eight, the family moved to nearby Homewood, where he later attended Westinghouse High School. Stokes did not start his first two years at Westinghouse, but, in his last two years, he helped lead the Bulldogs to back-to-back city championships in 1950 and 1951.

== College career ==
Stokes graduated from Saint Francis College in Loretto, Pennsylvania, where he led the Red Flash to the National Invitation Tournament (NIT) in 1955 and was named Most Valuable Player, although his team finished fourth in the tournament. In his first college season, Stokes averaged 23.1 points and 26.5 rebounds per game. In the following season, he averaged 27.1 points and 26.2 rebounds per game. Stokes remains St. Francis's all-time leading rebounder with 1,819 and is second in scoring with 2,282 points. The Red Flash were 79-30 during Stokes's four seasons. He later was inducted into the St. Francis University Athletic Hall of Fame.

== Professional career ==
Selected second overall in the 1955 NBA draft by the Rochester Royals, Stokes averaged 16.3 rebounds per game during his rookie season and was named NBA Rookie of the Year. The next season, he set a league record for most rebounds in a single season with 1,256 (17.4 per game). The Royals relocated to Cincinnati in 1957 and Stokes was second in the NBA in rebounds and third in assists in 1957–58; a feat only Wilt Chamberlain and Nikola Jokić have matched for a full season.

During his three seasons in the NBA (1955–58), he grabbed more rebounds than any other player with 3,492 (Bob Pettit was second with 3,417) and also amassed 1,062 assists, which was second in the NBA only to Boston Celtics' point guard Bob Cousy (1,583). Stokes was named an All-Star and All-NBA Second Team for all three seasons of his career. He was inducted into the Naismith Memorial Basketball Hall of Fame in September 2004.

Stokes is one of eight NBA players who have recorded four consecutive triple-doubles.

== Injury and paralysis ==
On March 12, 1958, in the last game of the regular season, Stokes was knocked unconscious after he drove to the basket, drew contact, and struck his head as he fell to the court. He was revived with smelling salts and returned to the game. Three days later, after recording 12 points and 15 rebounds in an opening-round playoff game against the Detroit Pistons, he became ill on the team's flight back to Cincinnati and lapsed into unconsciousness. Stokes later suffered a seizure and was left permanently paralyzed. He was diagnosed with post-traumatic encephalopathy, a brain injury that damaged his motor-control center.

During the years that followed, Stokes would be supported and cared for by his lifelong friend and teammate, Jack Twyman, who became Stokes's legal guardian. Although permanently paralyzed, Stokes was mentally alert and communicated by blinking his eyes. He adopted a grueling physical therapy regimen that eventually allowed him limited physical movement, and he eventually regained limited speaking ability. Stokes's condition deteriorated through the 1960s, and he was later transferred to Good Samaritan Hospital in Cincinnati, where Twyman continued to be a regular visitor.

== Death ==
Twelve years after his injury, Stokes died at age 36 from a heart attack on April 6, 1970, and received a series of Catholic funerals.

At his own request, he was buried in Franciscan Friar Cemetery on the campus of Saint Francis in Loretto.

== Legacy ==
After Jack Twyman became Stokes's legal guardian, Twyman organized a charity exhibition basketball game in 1958 to help raise funds for Stokes's medical expenses. That game, spearheaded by Milton Kutsher, became an annual tradition and was named the Maurice Stokes Memorial Basketball Game. It was later changed to the Maurice Stokes/Wilt Chamberlain Celebrity Pro-Am Golf Tournament due to NBA and insurance company restrictions regarding athletes.

Stokes's life, injury, and relationship with Twyman are all depicted in the 1973 National General Pictures film Maurie.

=== NBA Twyman-Stokes Teammate of the Year Award ===
On June 9, 2013, the NBA announced that both Stokes and Jack Twyman would be honored with an annual award in their names, the Twyman–Stokes Teammate of the Year Award, which recognizes the player that embodies the league's ideal teammate that season.

=== The Maurice Stokes Athletics Center ===
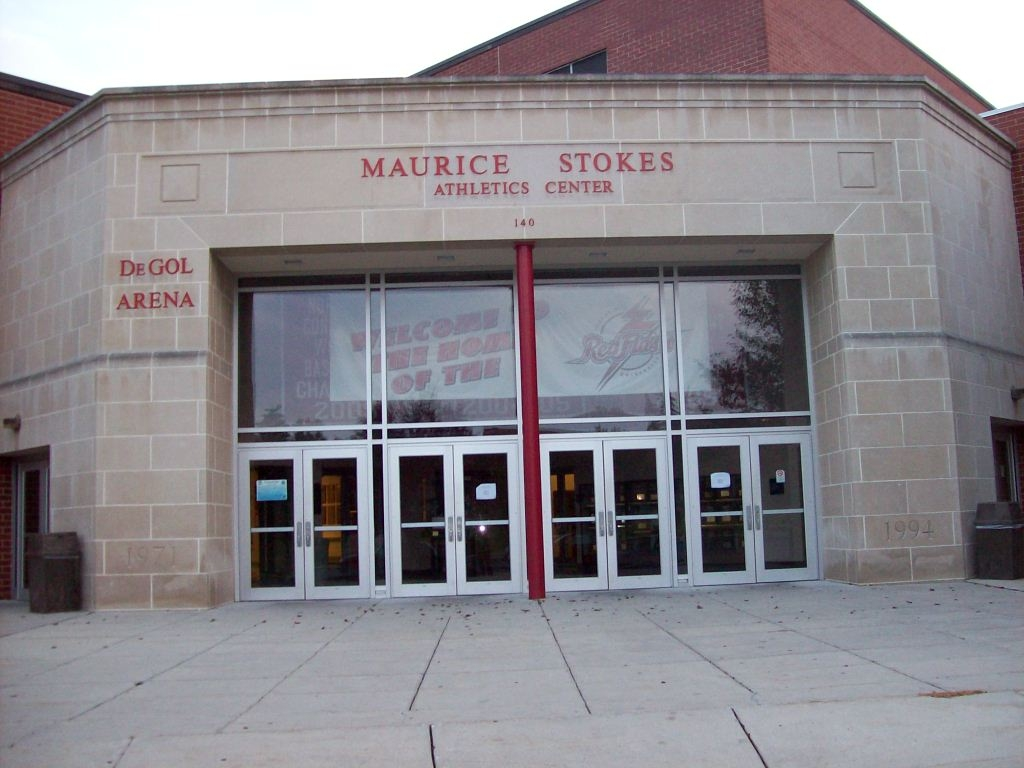
The Maurice Stokes Athletics Center

The Maurice Stokes Athletics Center (originally called the Maurice Stokes Physical Education Building when it opened in 1971) on the St. Francis University campus is named after him.

== Career statistics ==
Legend
GP	Games played	GS	Games started	MPG	Minutes per game
FG%	Field goal percentage	3P%	3-point field goal percentage	FT%	Free throw percentage
RPG	Rebounds per game	APG	Assists per game	SPG	Steals per game
BPG	Blocks per game	PPG	Points per game	**Bold**	Career high
*	Led the league

=== NBA ===
==== Regular season ====
Year	Team	GP	MPG	FG%	FT%	RPG	APG	PPG
1955–56	Rochester	67	34.7	**.354**	.714	16.3*	4.7	16.8
1956–57	Rochester	**72**	38.3	.347	.665	17.4	4.6	15.6
1957–58	Cincinnati	63	**39.0**	.351	**.715**	**18.1**	**6.4**	**16.9**
Career		202	37.3	.351	.698	17.3	5.3	16.4
All-Star		3	29.0	.349	.600	14.0	4.0	13.0

==== Playoffs ====
Year	Team	GP	MPG	FG%	FT%	RPG	APG	PPG
1958	Cincinnati	1	39.0	.250	.857	15.0	2.0	12.0

==== College ====
Year	Team	GP	FG%	FT%	RPG	PPG
1953–54	St. Francis	26	.426	.695	**26.5**	23.1
1954–55	St. Francis	**28**	**.427**	**.716**	26.2	**27.1**
Career		54	.427	.706	26.3	25.2

== See also ==
- List of National Basketball Association annual rebounding leaders
- List of National Basketball Association single-game rebounding leaders
- List of NCAA Division I men's basketball players with 30 or more rebounds in a game
- List of NCAA Division I men's basketball players with 2,000 points and 1,000 rebounds
