= 1961–62 NCAA University Division men's basketball season =

Men's collegiate basketball season

- Preseason AP No. 1: Ohio State Buckeyes
- NCAA Tournament: 1962
- Tournament dates: March 12 – 24, 1962
- National Championship: Freedom Hall; Louisville, Kentucky
- NCAA Champions: Cincinnati Bearcats
- Helms National Champions: Cincinnati Bearcats
- Other champions: Dayton Flyers (NIT)
- Player of the Year (Helms): Paul Hogue, Cincinnati Bearcats

The 1961–62 NCAA University Division men's basketball season began in December 1961, progressed through the regular season and conference tournaments, and concluded with the 1962 NCAA University Division basketball tournament championship game on March 24, 1962, at Freedom Hall in Louisville, Kentucky. The Cincinnati Bearcats won their second NCAA national championship with a 71–59 victory over the Ohio State Buckeyes.

== Season headlines ==
- The Associated Press (AP) Poll changed format, abandoning the Top 20 format it had used since its inception in the 1948–49 season and becoming a Top 10 poll.
- Cincinnati's national championship was its second in a row as well as second overall, and the national championship game was a rematch from the year before between Cincinnati and Ohio State.
- The 1962 NCAA University Division basketball tournament set a new attendance record for an NCAA tournament, with a combined 177,469 fans attending its 29 games.
- The Border Conference and Mountain States (or Skyline) Conference both disbanded at the end of the season.

== Season outlook ==
=== Pre-season polls ===
The Top 10 from the AP Poll and the UPI Coaches Poll during the pre-season.

Associated Press
Ranking	Team
1	Ohio State
2	Cincinnati
3	Wake Forest
4	USC
5	Providence
6	Purdue
7	Duke
8	Kansas State
9	St. John's
10	Seattle

UPI Coaches
Ranking	Team
1	Ohio State
2	Cincinnati
3	Kansas State
4	Providence
5	Duke
6	Purdue
7	USC
8	Arizona State
9	West Virginia
10	Wake Forest

== Conference membership changes ==
School	Former conference	New conference
Regis Rangers	non-University Division	NCAA University Division independent

== Regular season ==
=== Conference ===
==== Conference winners and tournaments ====
Conference	Regular season winner	Conference player of the year	Conference tournament	Tournament venue (City)	Tournament winner
Athletic Association of Western Universities	UCLA	None selected	No Tournament		
Atlantic Coast Conference	Wake Forest	Len Chappell, Wake Forest	1962 ACC men's basketball tournament	Reynolds Coliseum (Raleigh, North Carolina)	Wake Forest
Big Eight Conference	Colorado	None selected	No Tournament		
Big Ten Conference	Ohio State	None selected	No Tournament		
Border Conference	Arizona State		No Tournament		
Ivy League	Yale	None selected	No Tournament		
Metropolitan New York Conference	St. John's		No Tournament		
Mid-American Conference	Bowling Green State	None selected	No Tournament		
Middle Atlantic Conference	Saint Joseph's		No Tournament		
Mountain States (Skyline) Conference	Utah		No Tournament		
Missouri Valley Conference	Bradley & Cincinnati	None selected	No Tournament		
Ohio Valley Conference	Western Kentucky State	None selected	No Tournament		
Southeastern Conference	Kentucky & Mississippi State	None selected	No Tournament		
Southern Conference	West Virginia	Rod Thorn, West Virginia	1962 Southern Conference men's basketball tournament	Richmond Arena (Richmond, Virginia)	West Virginia
Southwest Conference	SMU & Texas Tech	Carroll Broussard, Texas A&M	No Tournament		
West Coast Athletic Conference	Pepperdine	Harry Dinnel, Pepperdine, & Steve Gray, Saint Mary's	No Tournament		
Yankee Conference	Massachusetts	None selected	No Tournament		

==== Conference standings ====
1961–62 AAWU Conference men's basketball standings
	Conf.				Overall
Team	W		L	PCT	W		L	PCT
UCLA	10	–	2	.833	18	–	11	.621
Stanford	8	–	4	.667	16	–	6	.727
Washington	5	–	7	.417	16	–	10	.615
USC	5	–	7	.417	14	–	11	.560
California	2	–	10	.167	8	–	17	.320
Rankings from AP Poll

1961–62 ACC men's basketball standings
	Conf.				Overall
Team	W		L	PCT	W		L	PCT
Wake Forest †	12	–	2	.857	22	–	9	.710
No. 10 Duke	11	–	3	.786	20	–	5	.800
NC State	10	–	4	.714	11	–	6	.647
North Carolina	7	–	7	.500	8	–	9	.471
South Carolina	7	–	7	.500	15	–	12	.556
Clemson	4	–	10	.286	12	–	15	.444
Maryland	3	–	11	.214	8	–	17	.320
Virginia	2	–	12	.143	5	–	18	.217
† 1962 ACC tournament winner Rankings from AP Poll

1961–62 Big Eight Conference men's basketball standings
	Conf.				Overall
Team	W		L	PCT	W		L	PCT
No. 9 Colorado	13	–	1	.929	19	–	7	.731
No. 6 Kansas State	12	–	2	.857	22	–	3	.880
Iowa State	8	–	6	.571	13	–	12	.520
Oklahoma State	7	–	7	.500	14	–	11	.560
Nebraska	5	–	9	.357	9	–	16	.360
Oklahoma	5	–	9	.357	7	–	17	.292
Missouri	3	–	11	.214	9	–	16	.360
Kansas	3	–	11	.214	7	–	18	.280
Rankings from AP Poll

1961–62 Big Ten Conference men's basketball standings
	Conf.				Overall
Team	W		L	PCT	W		L	PCT
No. 1 Ohio State	13	–	1	.929	26	–	2	.929
Wisconsin	10	–	4	.714	17	–	7	.708
Purdue	9	–	5	.643	17	–	7	.708
Illinois	7	–	7	.500	15	–	8	.652
Indiana	7	–	7	.500	13	–	11	.542
Iowa	7	–	7	.500	13	–	11	.542
Minnesota	6	–	8	.429	10	–	14	.417
Michigan	5	–	9	.357	7	–	17	.292
Michigan State	3	–	11	.214	8	–	14	.364
Northwestern	3	–	11	.214	8	–	15	.348
Rankings from AP Poll

1961–62 Border Conference men's basketball standings
	Conf.				Overall
Team	W		L	PCT	W		L	PCT
Arizona State–Tempe	10	–	0	1.000	23	–	4	.852
Arizona	5	–	5	.500	12	–	14	.462
Texas Western	6	–	4	.600	18	–	6	.750
New Mexico State	4	–	6	.400	10	–	14	.417
West Texas State	4	–	6	.400	5	–	18	.217
Hardin–Simmons	1	–	9	.100	8	–	17	.320
Rankings from AP Poll

1961–62 Ivy League men's basketball standings
	Conf.				Overall
Team	W		L	PCT	W		L	PCT
Yale	13	–	1	.929	18	–	6	.750
Pennsylvania	11	–	3	.786	17	–	8	.680
Princeton	10	–	4	.714	13	–	10	.565
Cornell	9	–	5	.643	18	–	7	.720
Brown	6	–	8	.429	11	–	14	.440
Harvard	3	–	11	.214	10	–	14	.417
Dartmouth	3	–	11	.214	6	–	18	.250
Columbia	1	–	13	.071	3	–	21	.125
Rankings from AP Poll

1961–62 Metropolitan New York Conference men's basketball standings
	Conf.				Overall
Team	W		L	PCT	W		L	PCT
St. John's	5	–	0	1.000	21	–	5	.808
CCNY	2	–	1	.667	9	–	9	.500
NYU	3	–	2	.600	20	–	5	.800
St. Francis (NY)	2	–	3	.400	8	–	15	.348
Manhattan	1	–	3	.250	12	–	10	.545
Fordham	1	–	3	.250	10	–	14	.417
Brooklyn	0	–	2	.000	4	–	13	.235
Rankings from AP Poll

1961–62 Mid-American Conference men's basketball standings
	Conf.				Overall
Team	W		L	PCT	W		L	PCT
No. 8 Bowling Green State	11	–	1	.917	21	–	4	.840
Ohio	8	–	4	.667	13	–	10	.565
Toledo	7	–	5	.583	14	–	10	.583
Western Michigan	6	–	6	.500	13	–	11	.542
Marshall	6	–	6	.500	10	–	13	.435
Miami (Ohio)	3	–	9	.250	7	–	17	.292
Kent State	1	–	11	.083	2	–	19	.095
Rankings from AP Poll

1961–62 MAC men's basketball standings
	Conf.				Overall
Team	W		L	PCT	W		L	PCT
Saint Joseph's†	9	–	1	.900	18	–	10	.643
Temple	8	–	2	.800	18	–	9	.667
Delaware	9	–	3	.750	18	–	5	.783
Lafayette	9	–	3	.750	18	–	6	.750
La Salle	5	–	3	.625	16	–	9	.640
Gettysburg	7	–	5	.583	18	–	6	.750
Lehigh	4	–	10	.286	7	–	12	.368
Rutgers	2	–	8	.200	10	–	13	.435
Bucknell	2	–	9	.182	7	–	15	.318
Muhlenberg	1	–	12	.077	5	–	17	.227
† Regular-season championship winner Rankings from AP Poll

1961–62 Missouri Valley Conference men's basketball standings
	Conf.				Overall
Team	W		L	PCT	W		L	PCT
No. 2 Cincinnati	10	–	2	.833	29	–	2	.935
No. 5 Bradley	10	–	2	.833	21	–	7	.750
Wichita Municipal	7	–	5	.583	18	–	9	.667
Drake	6	–	6	.500	16	–	8	.667
Saint Louis	5	–	7	.417	11	–	15	.423
Tulsa	4	–	8	.333	7	–	19	.269
North Texas State	0	–	12	.000	3	–	23	.115
Rankings from AP Poll

1961–62 Mountain States Conference men's basketball standings
	Conf.				Overall
Team	W		L	PCT	W		L	PCT
No. 7 Utah	13	–	1	.929	23	–	3	.885
Utah State	12	–	2	.857	22	–	7	.759
Colorado State	10	–	4	.714	18	–	9	.667
Montana	5	–	9	.357	10	–	14	.417
BYU	5	–	9	.357	10	–	16	.385
Denver	5	–	9	.357	8	–	17	.320
Wyoming	3	–	11	.214	9	–	17	.346
New Mexico	3	–	11	.214	6	–	20	.231
Rankings from AP Poll

1961–62 Ohio Valley Conference men's basketball standings
	Conf.				Overall
Team	W		L	PCT	W		L	PCT
Western Kentucky State	11	–	1	.917	17	–	10	.630
Tennessee Tech	7	–	5	.583	16	–	6	.727
Morehead State	7	–	5	.583	14	–	8	.636
Eastern Kentucky State	7	–	5	.583	10	–	6	.625
Murray State	5	–	7	.417	13	–	12	.520
East Tennessee State	3	–	9	.250	11	–	14	.440
Middle Tennessee	2	–	10	.167	6	–	12	.333
Rankings from AP Poll

1961–62 Southeastern Conference men's basketball standings
	Conf.				Overall
Team	W		L	PCT	W		L	PCT
No. 4 Mississippi State	13	–	1	.929	24	–	1	.960
No. 3 Kentucky	13	–	1	.929	23	–	3	.885
Auburn	11	–	3	.786	18	–	6	.750
Florida	8	–	6	.571	12	–	11	.522
LSU	7	–	7	.500	13	–	11	.542
Tulane	6	–	8	.429	12	–	10	.545
Vanderbilt	6	–	8	.429	12	–	12	.500
Alabama	6	–	8	.429	11	–	15	.423
Ole Miss	5	–	9	.357	12	–	13	.480
Georgia Tech	4	–	10	.286	10	–	16	.385
Georgia	3	–	11	.214	8	–	16	.333
Tennessee	2	–	12	.143	4	–	19	.174
Rankings from AP Poll

1961–62 Southern Conference men's basketball standings
	Conf.				Overall
Team	W		L	PCT	W		L	PCT
West Virginia †	12	–	1	.923	24	–	6	.800
Virginia Tech	9	–	3	.750	19	–	6	.760
Furman	8	–	5	.615	15	–	12	.556
George Washington	6	–	7	.462	9	–	15	.375
Davidson	5	–	6	.455	14	–	11	.560
VMI	6	–	8	.429	9	–	11	.450
The Citadel	4	–	8	.333	8	–	15	.348
Richmond	5	–	11	.313	6	–	21	.222
William & Mary	5	–	11	.313	7	–	17	.292
† Southern Conference Tournament winner Rankings from AP Poll

1961–62 Southwest Conference men's basketball standings
	Conf.				Overall
Team	W		L	PCT	W		L	PCT
SMU	11	–	3	.786	18	–	7	.720
Texas Tech	11	–	3	.786	19	–	8	.704
Texas A&M	9	–	5	.643	15	–	9	.625
Texas	8	–	6	.571	16	–	8	.667
Rice	7	–	7	.500	12	–	11	.522
Arkansas	5	–	9	.357	14	–	10	.583
TCU	4	–	10	.286	5	–	19	.208
Baylor	1	–	13	.071	4	–	20	.167
Rankings from AP Poll

1961–62 West Coast Athletic Conference men's basketball standings
	Conf.				Overall
Team	W		L	PCT	W		L	PCT
Pepperdine	11	–	1	.917	20	–	7	.741
Santa Clara	8	–	4	.667	19	–	6	.760
Saint Mary's	8	–	4	.667	13	–	11	.542
Loyola (Calif.)	6	–	6	.500	18	–	9	.667
Pacific	5	–	7	.417	10	–	16	.385
San Francisco	4	–	8	.333	10	–	15	.400
San Jose State		–		–	13	–	11	.542
† Regular-season championship winner Rankings from AP Poll

1961–62 Yankee Conference men's basketball standings
	Conf.				Overall
Team	W		L	PCT	W		L	PCT
Massachusetts	8	–	2	.800	15	–	9	.625
Connecticut	7	–	3	.700	16	–	8	.667
Rhode Island	7	–	3	.700	14	–	12	.538
Maine	4	–	6	.400	11	–	13	.458
Vermont	3	–	7	.300	12	–	12	.500
New Hampshire	1	–	9	.100	3	–	20	.130

=== University Division independents ===
A total of 47 college teams played as University Division independents. Among them, Loyola of Illinois (23–4) had the best winning percentage (.852), while Oregon State (24–5) and Dayton (24–6) finished with the most wins.

1961–62 NCAA University Division men's basketball independents standings
	Conf.				Overall
Team	W		L	PCT	W		L	PCT
Loyola (Ill.)		–		–	23	–	4	.852
Oregon State		–		–	24	–	5	.828
Creighton		–		–	21	–	5	.808
Dayton		–		–	24	–	6	.800
Butler		–		–	22	–	6	.786
Houston		–		–	21	–	6	.778
Holy Cross		–		–	20	–	6	.769
Providence		–		–	20	–	6	.769
Duquesne		–		–	22	–	7	.759
Villanova		–		–	21	–	7	.750
Air Force		–		–	16	–	7	.696
Boston College		–		–	15	–	7	.682
Memphis State		–		–	15	–	7	.682
Niagara		–		–	16	–	8	.667
St. Bonaventure		–		–	14	–	7	.667
Seattle		–		–	18	–	9	.667
Centenary (La.)		–		–	17	–	9	.654
Idaho State		–		–	17	–	9	.654
Florida State		–		–	15	–	8	.652
Saint Francis (Pa.)		–		–	14	–	8	.636
Seton Hall		–		–	15	–	9	.625
Navy		–		–	13	–	8	.619
Georgetown		–		–	14	–	9	.609
Louisville		–		–	15	–	10	.600
Marquette		–		–	15	–	11	.577
Canisius		–		–	12	–	9	.571
DePaul		–		–	13	–	10	.565
Detroit		–		–	15	–	12	.556
Gonzaga		–		–	14	–	12	.538
Miami (Fla.)		–		–	14	–	12	.538
Oklahoma City		–		–	14	–	12	.538
Xavier		–		–	14	–	12	.538
Penn State		–		–	12	–	11	.522
Pittsburgh		–		–	12	–	11	.522
Idaho		–		–	13	–	13	.500
Loyola (La.)		–		–	12	–	13	.480
Army		–		–	10	–	11	.476
Regis		–		–	10	–	11	.476
Montana State		–		–	10	–	13	.435
Iona		–		–	8	–	11	.421
Colgate		–		–	8	–	15	.348
Oregon		–		–	9	–	17	.346
Portland		–		–	8	–	18	.308
Washington State		–		–	8	–	18	.308
Notre Dame		–		–	7	–	16	.304
Boston University		–		–	5	–	15	.250
Syracuse		–		–	2	–	22	.083
Rankings from AP Poll

=== Informal championships ===
Conference	Regular season winner	Most Valuable Player
Philadelphia Big 5	Villanova	Hubie White, Villanova

Villanova finished with a 4–0 record in head-to-head competition among the Philadelphia Big 5.

== Post-season tournaments ==
=== NCAA tournament ===
==== Final Four ====
National semifinals
E	Wake Forest	68
ME	Ohio State	84
MW	Cincinnati	72
W	UCLA	70

National finals
ME	Ohio State	59
MW	Cincinnati	71
National finals
E	Wake Forest	82
W	UCLA	80

=== National Invitation tournament ===
==== Semifinals & finals ====
Semifinals
Dayton	98
Loyola (Ill.)	82
Duquesne	65
St. John's	75

Finals
Dayton	73
St. John's	67
Third place
Loyola (Ill.)	95
Duquesne	84

== Awards ==
=== Consensus All-American teams ===
Consensus First Team
Player	Position	Class	Team
Len Chappell	C/F	Senior	Wake Forest
Terry Dischinger	F	Senior	Purdue
Jerry Lucas	F/C	Senior	Ohio State
Billy McGill	C	Senior	Utah
Chet Walker	F	Senior	Bradley

Consensus Second Team
Player	Position	Class	Team
Jack Foley	G/F	Senior	Holy Cross
John Havlicek	F	Senior	Ohio State
Art Heyman	F	Junior	Duke
Cotton Nash	F	Sophomore	Kentucky
John Rudometkin	F	Senior	USC
Rod Thorn	G/F	Junior	West Virginia

=== Major player of the year awards ===
- Helms Player of the Year: Paul Hogue, Cincinnati
- Associated Press Player of the Year:Jerry Lucas, Ohio State
- UPI Player of the Year: Jerry Lucas, Ohio State
- Oscar Robertson Trophy (USBWA):Jerry Lucas, Ohio State
- Sporting News Player of the Year: Jerry Lucas, Ohio State

=== Major coach of the year awards ===
- Henry Iba Award: Fred Taylor, Ohio State
- NABC Coach of the Year: Fred Taylor, Ohio State
- UPI Coach of the Year: Fred Taylor, Ohio State

=== Other major awards ===
- Robert V. Geasey Trophy (Top player in Philadelphia Big 5): Hubie White, Villanova
- NIT/Haggerty Award (Top player in New York City metro area): LeRoy Ellis, St. John's

== Coaching changes ==
A number of teams changed coaches during the season and after it ended.

Team	Former Coach	Interim Coach	New Coach	Reason
Boston College	Dino Martin	Frank Power		Power will continue to be the Freshman coach
Bucknell	Ben Kribbs		Gene Evans	
Colgate	Howard Hartman		Bob Dewey	
Denver	Hoyt Brawner		Troy Bledsoe	
Eastern Kentucky State	Paul McGrayer		Jim Baechtold	
Hardin–Simmons	Bill Scott		Lou Henson	
Memphis State	Bob Vanatta		Dean Ehlers	Vanatta left to coach Missouri.
Middle Tennessee	Ed Diddle Jr.		Bill Stokes	
Missouri	Wilbur Stalcup		Bob Vanatta	
Montana	Frosty Cox		Ron Nord	
Montana State	Dobbie Lambert		Roger Craft	
New Mexico	Bob Sweeney		Bob King	
Oklahoma	Doyle Parrack		Bob Stevens	
Ole Miss	B. L. Graham		Eddie Crawford	
Pacific	Van Sweet		Dick Edwards	
Princeton	Jake McCandless		Butch van Breda Kolff	
Rutgers	Tony Kuolt		Donald White	
Saint Mary's	Jim Weaver		Mike Cimino	
Santa Clara	Bob Feerick		Dick Garibaldi	
South Carolina	Bob Stevens		Chuck Noe	Stevens left to coach Oklahoma.
Syracuse	Marc Guley		Fred Lewis	
Virginia Tech	Chuck Noe		William Matthews	Noe left to coach South Carolina.
