= List of Creighton Bluejays men's basketball seasons =

This is a list of seasons completed by the Creighton Bluejays men's college basketball team. The Bluejays have won 20 regular season crowns and 12 conference tournament titles. They have appeared in 18 NCAA basketball tournaments, reaching the Sweet Sixteen 4 times.

== Season-by-Season Results ==
Statistics overview
Season	Coach	Overall	Conference	Standing	Postseason
Claus Delfs (Independent) (1911–1912)
1911–12	Claus Delfs	15–4	—	—	—
Claus Delfs:		15–4 (.789)	—		
Thomas E. 'Tommy' Mills (Independent) (1916–1920)
1916–17	Tommy Mills	17–3	—	—	—
1917–18	Tommy Mills	11–0	—	—	—
1918–19	Tommy Mills	10–0	—	—	—
1919–20	Tommy Mills	15–3	—	—	—
Tommy Mills:		53–6 (.898)	—		
Eddie Mulholland (Independent) (1920–1921)
1920–21	Eddie Mulholland	5–1	—	—	—
Eddie Mulholland:		5–1 (.833)	—		
Charles Kearney (Independent) (1921–1922)
1920–21	Charles Kearney	8–4	—	—	—
1921–22	Charles Kearney	23–5	—	—	—
Charles Kearney:		31–9 (.775)	—		
Arthur A. Schabinger (North Central Conference) (1922–1927)
1922–23	Arthur Schabinger	12–5	11–3	1st	—
1923–24	Arthur Schabinger	13–2	9–1	1st	—
1924–25	Arthur Schabinger	14–2	7–0	1st	—
1925–26	Arthur Schabinger	11–9	4–3	4th	—
1926–27	Arthur Schabinger	14–5	6–2	1st	—
Arthur A. Schabinger (Independent) (1927–1928)
1927–28	Arthur Schabinger	13–2	—	—	—
Arthur A. Schabinger (Missouri Valley Conference) (1928–1935)
1928–29	Arthur Schabinger	13–4	4–1	2nd	—
1929–30	Arthur Schabinger	12–7	6–2	T–1st	—
1930–31	Arthur Schabinger	8–10	5–3	T–1st	—
1931–32	Arthur Schabinger	17–4	8–0	1st	—
1932–33	Arthur Schabinger	12–5	8–2	2nd	—
1933–34	Arthur Schabinger	14–3	7–3	2nd	—
1934–35	Arthur Schabinger	12–8	8–4	T–1st	—
Arthur Schabinger:		165–66 (.714)	83–24 (.776)		
Edgar S. Hickey (Missouri Valley Conference) (1935–1943)
1935–36	Eddie Hickey	13–6	8–4	T–1st	—
1936–37	Eddie Hickey	11–9	8–4	2nd	—
1937–38	Eddie Hickey	11–14	7–7	4th	—
1938–39	Eddie Hickey	11–12	7–7	5th	—
1939–40	Eddie Hickey	11–9	8–4	2nd	—
1940–41	Eddie Hickey	18–7	9–3	1st	NCAA Elite Eight
1941–42	Eddie Hickey	18–5	9–1	T–1st	NIT Third Place
1942–43	Eddie Hickey	16–1	10–0	1st	NIT Quarterfinal
Duce Belford (Missouri Valley Conference) (1945–1946)
1945–46	Duce Belford	9–10	3–7	6th	—
Edgar S. Hickey (Missouri Valley Conference) (1946–1947)
1946–47	Eddie Hickey	17–8	7–5	4th	—
Edgar S. Hickey:		126–71 (.606)	73–35 (.676)		
Duce Belford (Missouri Valley Conference) (1947–1948)
1947–48	Duce Belford	10–13	4–6	4th	—
Duce Belford (Independent) (1947–1952)
1948–49	Duce Belford	9–14	—	—	—
1949–50	Duce Belford	13–13	—	—	NCIT First Round
1950–51	Duce Belford	9–18	—	—	—
1951–52	Duce Belford	6–15	—	—	—
Duce Belford:		56–83 (.403)	7–13 (.350)		
Sebastian 'Subby' Salerno (Independent) (1952–1955)
1952–53	Sebastian Salerno	11–14	—	—	—
1953–54	Sebastian Salerno	14–17	—	—	—
1954–55	Sebastian Salerno	5–14	—	—	—
Sebastian Salerno:		30–45 (.400)	—		
Theron Thomsen (Independent) (1955–1959)
1955–56	Theron Thomsen	11–12	—	—	—
1956–57	Theron Thomsen	15–6	—	—	—
1957–58	Theron Thomsen	10–12	—	—	—
1958–59	Theron Thomsen	13–9	—	—	—
Theron Thomsen:		49–39 (.557)	—		
John J. 'Red' McManus (Independent) (1959–1969)
1959–60	Red McManus	13–11	—	—	—
1960–61	Red McManus	8–17	—	—	—
1961–62	Red McManus	21–5	—	—	NCAA University Division Sweet Sixteen
1962–63	Red McManus	14–13	—	—	NCIT First Round
1963–64	Red McManus	22–7	—	—	NCAA University Division Sweet Sixteen
1964–65	Red McManus	13–10	—	—	—
1965–66	Red McManus	14–12	—	—	—
1966–67	Red McManus	12–13	—	—	—
1967–68	Red McManus	8–17	—	—	—
1968–69	Red McManus	13–13	—	—	—
Red McManus:		138–118 (.539)	—		
Eddie Sutton (Independent) (1969–1974)
1969–70	Eddie Sutton	15–10	—	—	—
1970–71	Eddie Sutton	14–11	—	—	—
1971–72	Eddie Sutton	15–11	—	—	—
1972–73	Eddie Sutton	15–11	—	—	—
1973–74	Eddie Sutton	23–7	—	—	NCAA Division I Sweet Sixteen
Eddie Sutton:		82–50 (.621)	—		
Tom Apke (Independent) (1974–1977)
1974–75	Tom Apke	20–7	—	—	NCAA Division I first round
1975–76	Tom Apke	19–7	—	—	—
1976–77	Tom Apke	21–7	—	—	NIT first round
Tom Apke (Missouri Valley Conference) (1977–1981)
1977–78	Tom Apke	19–9	12–4	1st	NCAA Division I first round
1978–79	Tom Apke	14–13	8–8	T–3rd	—
1979–80	Tom Apke	16–12	9–7	T–2nd	—
1980–81	Tom Apke	21–9	11–5	T–2nd	NCAA Division I first round
Tom Apke:		130–64 (.670)	40–24 (.625)		
Willis Reed (Missouri Valley Conference) (1981–1985)
1981–82	Willis Reed	7–20	4–12	8th	—
1982–83	Willis Reed	8–19	4–14	10th	—
1983–84	Willis Reed	17–14	8–8	4th	NIT first round
1984–85	Willis Reed	20–12	9–7	T–4th	—
Willis Reed:		52–65 (.444)	24–41 (.320)		
Tony Barone (Missouri Valley Conference) (1985–1991)
1985–86	Tony Barone	12–16	7–9	T–5th	—
1986–87	Tony Barone	9–19	4–10	T–7th	—
1987–88	Tony Barone	16–16	6–8	T–4th	—
1988–89	Tony Barone	20–11	11–3	1st	NCAA Division I first round
1989–90	Tony Barone	21–12	9–5	T–2nd	NIT first round
1990–91	Tony Barone	24–8	12–4	1st	NCAA Division I second round
Tony Barone:		102–82 (.554)	49–39 (.557)		
Rick Johnson (Missouri Valley Conference) (1991–1994)
1991–92	Rick Johnson	9–19	7–11	6th	—
1992–93	Rick Johnson	8–18	6–12	10th	—
1993–94	Rick Johnson	7–22	3–15	T–9th	—
Rick Johnson:		24–59 (.289)	16–38 (.296)		
Dana Altman (Missouri Valley Conference) (1994–2010)
1994–95	Dana Altman	7–19	4–14	T–9th	—
1995–96	Dana Altman	14–15	9–9	T–5th	—
1996–97	Dana Altman	15–15	10–8	6th	—
1997–98	Dana Altman	18–10	12–6	2nd	NIT first round
1998–99	Dana Altman	22–9	11–7	T–2nd	NCAA Division I second round
1999–00	Dana Altman	23–10	11–7	4th	NCAA Division I first round
2000–01	Dana Altman	24–8	14–4	1st	NCAA Division I first round
2001–02	Dana Altman	23–9	14–4	T–1st	NCAA Division I second round
2002–03	Dana Altman	29–5	15–3	2nd	NCAA Division I first round
2003–04	Dana Altman	20–9	12–6	T–2nd	NIT first round
2004–05	Dana Altman	23–11	11–7	T–3rd	NCAA Division I first round
2005–06	Dana Altman	20–10	12–6	T–2nd	NIT second round
2006–07	Dana Altman	22–11	13–5	2nd	NCAA Division I first round
2007–08	Dana Altman	22–11	10–8	4th	NIT second round
2008–09	Dana Altman	27–8	14–4	T–1st	NIT second round
2009–10	Dana Altman	18–16	10–8	4th	CIT Semifinal
Dana Altman:		327–176 (.650)	182–106 (.632)		
Greg McDermott (Missouri Valley Conference) (2010–2013)
2010–11	Greg McDermott	23–16	10–8	T–4th	CBI Runner-up
2011–12	Greg McDermott	29–6	14–4	2nd	NCAA Division I second round
2012–13	Greg McDermott	28–8	13–5	1st	NCAA Division I second round
Greg McDermott (Big East Conference) (2013–present)
2013–14	Greg McDermott	27–8	14–4	2nd	NCAA Division I second round
2014–15	Greg McDermott	14–19	4–14	9th	—
2015–16	Greg McDermott	20–15	9–9	6th	NIT Quarterfinal
2016–17	Greg McDermott	25–10	10–8	3rd	NCAA Division I first round
2017–18	Greg McDermott	21–12	10–8	T–3rd	NCAA Division I first round
2018–19	Greg McDermott	20–15	9–9	T–3rd	NIT Quarterfinal
2019–20	Greg McDermott	24–7	13–5	T–1st	No postseason held
2020–21	Greg McDermott	22–9	14–6	2nd	NCAA Division I Sweet Sixteen
2021–22	Greg McDermott	23–12	12–7	4th	NCAA Division I second round
2022–23	Greg McDermott	24–13	14–6	3rd	NCAA Division I Elite Eight
2023–24	Greg McDermott	25–10	14–6	T–2nd	NCAA Division I Sweet Sixteen
2024–25	Greg McDermott	25–11	15–5	2nd	NCAA Division I Second Round
Greg McDermott:		350–171 (.672)	175–104 (.627)		
Total:		1735–1109 (.610)			
National champion Postseason invitational champion Conference regular season champion Conference regular season and conference tournament champion Division regular season champion Division regular season and conference tournament champion Conference tournament champion
