= 1961–62 NCAA University Division men's basketball rankings =

- Season: 1961–62
- NCAA Tournament: 1962
- Preseason No. 1: Ohio State
- NCAA Tournament Champions: Cincinnati
NCAA University Division men's basketball rankings


The 1961–62 NCAA men's basketball rankings was made up of two human polls, the AP Poll and the Coaches Poll.

== Legend ==
	Increase in ranking
	Decrease in ranking
	New to rankings from previous week
Italics	Number of first place votes
(#–#)	Win–loss record
т	Tied with team above or below also with this symbol

== AP Poll ==
All AP polls for the 1961–62 season included only 10 ranked teams.

	Preseason	Week 2 Dec. 18	Week 3 Dec. 25	Week 4 Jan. 1	Week 5 Jan. 8	Week 6 Jan. 15	Week 7 Jan. 22	Week 8 Jan. 29	Week 9 Feb. 5	Week 10 Feb. 12	Week 11 Feb. 19	Week 12 Feb. 26	Week 13 Mar. 5	Final Mar. 12	
1.	Ohio State	Ohio State (5–0)	Ohio State (7–0)	Ohio State (10–0)	Ohio State (11–0)	Ohio State (12–0)	Ohio State (13–0)	Ohio State (14–0)	Ohio State (16–0)	Ohio State (18–0)	Ohio State (20–0)	Ohio State (21–0)	Ohio State (22–1)	Ohio State (23–1)	1.
2.	Cincinnati	Cincinnati (5–0)	Cincinnati (6–1)	Cincinnati (10–1)	Cincinnati (11–1)	Kentucky (12–1)	Kentucky (13–1)	Kentucky (13–1)	Kentucky (16–1)	Kentucky (17–1)	Cincinnati (21–2)	Cincinnati (23–2)	Cincinnati (24–2)	Cincinnati (24–2)	2.
3.	Wake Forest	Providence (5–0)	Duquesne (6–0)	Kentucky (8–1)	Kentucky (10–1)	Cincinnati (11–2)	Cincinnati (13–2)	Cincinnati (14–2)	Cincinnati (17–2)	Cincinnati (19–2)	Kentucky (17–2)	Kansas State (19–2)	Kansas State (21–2)	Kentucky (22–2)	3.
4.	USC	Kansas State (5–0)	USC (7–1)	Kansas State (10–1)	USC (11–2)	Kansas State (12–2)	Kansas State (13–2)	Kansas State (14–2)	Kansas State (15–2)	Kansas State (17–2)	Kansas State (18–2)	Kentucky (19–2)	Kentucky (20–2)	Mississippi State (24–1)	4.
5.	Providence	West Virginia (6–0)	Kansas State (7–1)	Villanova (11–0)	Kansas State (10–2)	Duquesne (11–1)	USC (12–3)	USC (12–3)	Duke (14–2)	Bradley (16–3)	Mississippi State (20–1)	Mississippi State (22–1)	Mississippi State (24–1)	Bradley (21–5)	5.
6.	Purdue	USC (5–1)	Kentucky (6–1)	USC (9–2)	Villanova (12–1)	USC (12–3)	Duquesne (12–2)	Duke (12–2)	Duquesne (16–2)	Oregon State (17–1)	Bradley (18–3)	Bradley (19–4)	Bradley (21–4)	Kansas State (22–3)	6.
7.	Duke	Duquesne (5–0)	West Virginia (6–1)	Duquesne (9–1)	Mississippi State (10–0)	Duke (11–2)	Duke (11–2)	Duquesne (14–2)	Bradley (14–3)	Duke (15–3)	Bowling Green (18–2)	Bowling Green (20–2)	Utah (22–3)	Utah (23–3)	7.
8.	Kansas State	Purdue (3–1)	Wichita (7–1)	Duke (8–1)	Duquesne (9–1)	Bowling Green (12–1)	Bowling Green (14–1)	Bowling Green (16–1)	Bowling Green (16–1)	Mississippi State (18–1)	Duke (17–4)	Duke (19–4)	Bowling Green (21–3)	Bowling Green (21–3)	8.
9.	St. John's	St. Bonaventure (6–0)	Purdue (5–1)	Mississippi State (9–0)	Bowling Green (10–1)	Bradley (10–2)	Bradley (11–3)	Bradley (12–3)	Mississippi State (16–1)	Duquesne (16–3)	Colorado (14–5)	Colorado (15–5)	Duke (20–5)	Colorado (18–5)	9.
10.	Seattle	Arizona State (5–0); Seattle (5–0)	Duke (7–1)	Bowling Green (8–1)	Duke (9–2)	Mississippi State (11–1)	Mississippi State (13–1)	Mississippi State (16–1)	Oregon State (16–1)	Bowling Green (16–2)	Oregon State (17–3)	Utah (21–3)	Loyola-Chicago (21–2)	Duke (20–5)	10.
	Preseason	Week 2 Dec. 18	Week 3 Dec. 25	Week 4 Jan. 1	Week 5 Jan. 8	Week 6 Jan. 15	Week 7 Jan. 22	Week 8 Jan. 29	Week 9 Feb. 5	Week 10 Feb. 12	Week 11 Feb. 19	Week 12 Feb. 26	Week 13 Mar. 5	Final Mar. 12	
		Dropped: Wake Forest (3–3); Duke (5–1); St. John's (3–1)	Dropped: Providence (5–2); St. Bonaventure (6–1); Arizona State (6–1); Seattle (5–0)	Dropped: Wichita (9–2); Purdue (7–2); West Virginia (7–3)	None	Dropped: Villanova (13–2)	None	None	Dropped: USC (12–4)	None	Dropped: Duquesne (16–5)	Dropped: Oregon State (18–4)	Dropped: Colorado (16–6)	Dropped: Loyola-Chicago (21–3)	

== UPI Poll ==
The initial UPI poll for this season included only 10 ranked teams, while UPI polls for the remainder of the season included 20 ranked teams.

	Week 1 Dec. 12	Week 2 Dec. 19	Week 3 Dec. 26	Week 4 Jan. 2	Week 5 Jan. 9	Week 6 Jan. 16	Week 7 Jan. 23	Week 8 Jan. 30	Week 9 Feb. 6	Week 10 Feb. 13	Week 11 Feb. 20	Week 12 Feb. 27	Week 13 Mar. 6	Final Mar. 13	
1.	Ohio State (4–0)	Ohio State (5–0)	Ohio State (7–0)	Ohio State (10–0)	Ohio State (11–0)	Ohio State (12–0)	Ohio State (13–0)	Ohio State (14–0)	Ohio State (16–0)	Ohio State (18–0)	Ohio State (20–0)	Ohio State (21–0)	Ohio State (22–1)	Ohio State (23–1)	1.
2.	Cincinnati (3–0)	Cincinnati (5–0)	Cincinnati (6–1)	Cincinnati (10–1)	Cincinnati (11–1)	Cincinnati (11–2)	Cincinnati (13–2)	Cincinnati (14–2)	Cincinnati (17–2)	Cincinnati (19–2)	Cincinnati (21–2)	Cincinnati (23–2)	Cincinnati (24–2)	Cincinnati (24–2)	2.
3.	Kansas State (3–0)	Kansas State (5–0)	Kansas State (7–1)	Kansas State (10–1)	USC (11–2)	Kentucky (12–1)	Kentucky (13–1)	Kentucky (13–1)	Kentucky (16–1)	Kentucky (17–1)	Kentucky (17–2)	Kansas State (19–2)	Kansas State (21–2)	Kentucky (22–2)	3.
4.	Providence (3–0)	Providence (5–0)	USC (7–1)	USC (9–2)	Kentucky (10–1)	Kansas State (12–2)	USC (12–3)	Kansas State (14–2)	Kansas State (15–2)	Kansas State (17–2)	Kansas State (18–2)	Kentucky (19–2)	Kentucky (20–2)	Mississippi State (24–1)	4.
5.	Duke (3–0)	USC (5–1)	Wichita (7–1)	Kentucky (8–1)	Kansas State (10–2)	USC (12–3)	Kansas State (13–2)	USC (12–3)	Duke (14–2)	Bradley (16–3)	Mississippi State (20–1)	Mississippi State (22–1)	Mississippi State (24–1)	Kansas State (22–3)	5.
6.	Purdue (2–0)	West Virginia (6–0)	Kentucky (6–1)	Villanova (11–0)	Villanova (12–1)	Duquesne (11–1)	Duquesne (12–2)	Duke (12–2)	Duquesne (16–2)	Oregon State (17–1)	Bradley (18–3)	Duke (19–4)	Bradley (21–4)	Bradley (21–5)	6.
7.	USC (3–1)	Arizona State (5–0)	Duquesne (6–0)	Duke (8–1)	Duquesne (9–1)	Bradley (10–2)	Bradley (11–3)	Duquesne (14–2)	USC (12–4)	Duke (15–3)	Duke (17–4)	Bradley (19–4)	Utah (22–3)	Wake Forest (18–8)	7.
8.	Arizona State (3–0)	Duke (6–1)	Duke (7–1)	Duquesne (9–1)	Duke (9–2)	Duke (11–2)	Villanova (14–2)	Bradley (12–3)	Bradley (14–3)	Mississippi State (18–1)	Oregon State (17–3)	Bowling Green (20–2)	Wake Forest (18–8)	Colorado (18–5)	8.
9.	West Virginia (4–0)	Purdue (3–1)	West Virginia (6–1)	Wichita (9–2)	Oregon State (9–1)	Villanova (13–2)	Duke (11–2)	Oregon State (14–1)	Oregon State (16–1)	Duquesne (16–3)	St. John's (15–4)	Loyola-Chicago (18–2)	Loyola-Chicago (21–2)	Bowling Green (21–3)	9.
10.	Wake Forest (2–1)	Wichita (5–1)	Utah (8–1)	Oregon State (7–1)	West Virginia (9–3)	Oregon State (11–1)	Oregon State (13–1)	Villanova (15–2)	Bowling Green (16–1)	USC (13–5)	Bowling Green (18–2) т	Colorado (15–5)	Bowling Green (21–3)	Utah (23–3)	10.
11.		Utah (5–1)	Providence (5–2)	Purdue (7–2)	Mississippi State (10–0)	Wichita (13–3)	Wichita (14–4)	Bowling Green (16–1)	Mississippi State (16–1)	Villanova (16–5)	Loyola-Chicago (16–2) т	Oregon State (18–4)	Duke (20–5)	Oregon State (22–4)	11.
12.		Duquesne (5–0)	Purdue (5–1)	West Virginia (7–3)	Utah (11–2)	West Virginia (11–3)	Bowling Green (14–1)	West Virginia (14–3)	Villanova (15–4)	Bowling Green (16–2) т	USC (14–6) т	UCLA (14–8)	UCLA (15–8)	St. John's (19–4)	12.
13.		St. John's (3–1)	NYU (6–0)	Texas Tech (6–1)	Bradley (8–2)	Mississippi State (11–1)	Mississippi State (13–1)	Mississippi State (16–1)	Colorado (10–5) т	St. John's (15–4) т	Colorado (14–5)	St. John's (16–4)	Oregon State (20–4)	Duke (20–5) т	13.
14.		Utah (3–1)	St. John's (4–1)	Mississippi State (9–0) т	Wichita (11–3)	Bowling Green (12–1)	West Virginia (13–3)	Utah (15–2)	Utah (16–3) т	Utah (17–3)	Duquesne (16–5) т	Duquesne (18–5)	West Virginia (24–5)	Loyola-Chicago (21–3) т	14.
15.		St. Bonaventure (6–0)	Texas Tech (4–1)	Bowling Green (8–1) т	Santa Clara (12–1)	Utah (13–2)	Utah (15–2)	Loyola-Chicago (21–2)	West Virginia (16–4) т	UCLA (11–7)	Utah (19–3) т	Utah (21–3)	St. John's (17–4)	Arizona State (22–3)	15.
16.		Drake (3–1)	Seattle (5–0)	Utah (10–2)	Bowling Green (10–1)	Stanford (7–2)	Stanford (8–2)	Colorado (9–5)	Arizona State (14–3)	Loyola-Chicago (15–2)	West Virginia (19–5)	Houston (21–5) т	Wisconsin (18–6)	West Virginia (24–5)	16.
17.		Dayton (5–0)	Santa Clara (8–1) т	Santa Clara (11–1) т	Illinois (8–1)	Purdue (10–3)	Colorado (8–5)	Arizona State (13–3) т	Loyola-Chicago (14–2)	Arizona State (18–3)	Utah State (18–4)	Wake Forest (15–8) т	Arizona State (22–3)	UCLA (16–9)	17.
18.		NYU (5–0)	Villanova (9–0) т	Temple (7–1) т	Purdue (7–3) т	St. John's (9–3)	St. John's (10–3)	Wichita (14–5) т	St. John's (13–4)	Colorado (12–5)	UCLA (12–8)	Arizona State (21–3)	Villanova (18–6)	Duquesne (22–5)	18.
19.		Texas Tech (3–1)	Mississippi State (7–0)	Illinois (7–1) т	Temple (9–1) т	Illinois (9–2)	Arizona State (13–3)	Houston (14–3) т	Stanford (10–4)	West Virginia (18–4)	Wake Forest (13–8)	Villanova (17–6)	Colorado (16–5)	Utah State (21–5)	19.
20.		Illinois (5–0)	Washington (5–1)	St. John's (6–2) т	Colorado State (8–3)	Santa Clara (12–3)	Santa Clara (12–3)	North Carolina (6–2) т Santa Clara (14–3) т	Loyola Marymount (14–3) т UCLA (10–7) т Utah State (15–4) т	Washington (11–8)	Arizona State (20–3) т NC State (11–4) т	West Virginia (21–5) т USC (14–8) т	NYU (17–3)	Villanova (19–6)	20.
	Week 1 Dec. 12	Week 2 Dec. 19	Week 3 Dec. 26	Week 4 Jan. 2	Week 5 Jan. 9	Week 6 Jan. 16	Week 7 Jan. 23	Week 8 Jan. 30	Week 9 Feb. 6	Week 10 Feb. 13	Week 11 Feb. 20	Week 12 Feb. 27	Week 13 Mar. 6	Final Mar. 13	
		Dropped: Wake Forest (2–2)	Dropped: Arizona State; St. Bonaventure; Drake; Dayton; Illinois	Dropped: Providence; NYU; Seattle; Washington	Dropped: Texas Tech; St. John's	Dropped: Temple; Colorado State	Dropped: Purdue; Illinois	Dropped: Stanford; St. John's	Dropped: Wichita; Houston; North Carolina; Santa Clara	Dropped: Stanford; Loyola Marymount; Utah State	Dropped: Villanova; Washington	Dropped: Utah State; NC State	Dropped: Duquesne; Houston; USC	Dropped: Wisconsin (17–7); NYU (18–4)	
