= 1961–62 Houston Cougars men's basketball team =

American college basketball season

1961–62 Houston Cougars men's basketball
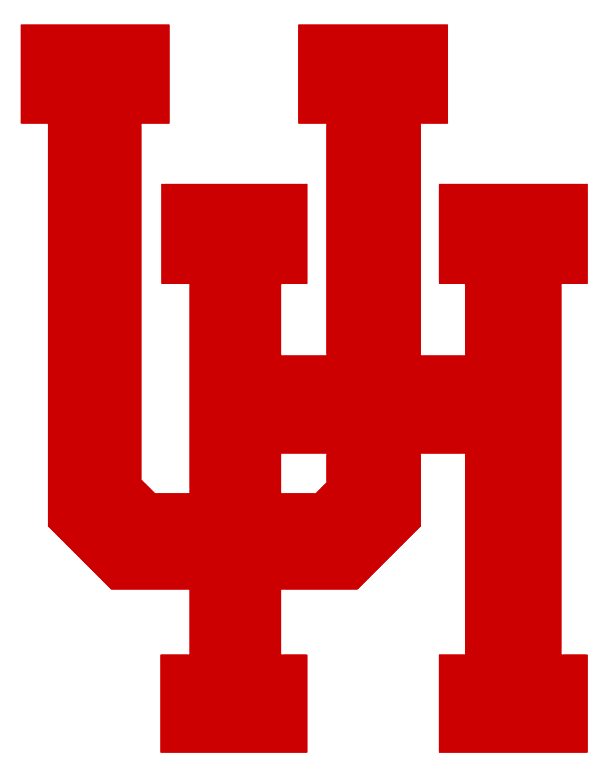

NIT, Quarterfinals
- Conference: Independent
- Record: 21–6
- Head coach: Guy Lewis (6th season)
- Assistant coach: Harvey Pate
- Home arena: Jeppesen Fieldhouse

1961–62 NCAA University Division men's basketball independents standings
	Conf.				Overall
Team	W		L	PCT	W		L	PCT
Loyola (Ill.)		–		–	23	–	4	.852
Oregon State		–		–	24	–	5	.828
Creighton		–		–	21	–	5	.808
Dayton		–		–	24	–	6	.800
Butler		–		–	22	–	6	.786
Houston		–		–	21	–	6	.778
Holy Cross		–		–	20	–	6	.769
Providence		–		–	20	–	6	.769
Duquesne		–		–	22	–	7	.759
Villanova		–		–	21	–	7	.750
Air Force		–		–	16	–	7	.696
Boston College		–		–	15	–	7	.682
Memphis State		–		–	15	–	7	.682
Niagara		–		–	16	–	8	.667
St. Bonaventure		–		–	14	–	7	.667
Seattle		–		–	18	–	9	.667
Centenary (La.)		–		–	17	–	9	.654
Idaho State		–		–	17	–	9	.654
Florida State		–		–	15	–	8	.652
Saint Francis (Pa.)		–		–	14	–	8	.636
Seton Hall		–		–	15	–	9	.625
Navy		–		–	13	–	8	.619
Georgetown		–		–	14	–	9	.609
Louisville		–		–	15	–	10	.600
Marquette		–		–	15	–	11	.577
Canisius		–		–	12	–	9	.571
DePaul		–		–	13	–	10	.565
Detroit		–		–	15	–	12	.556
Gonzaga		–		–	14	–	12	.538
Miami (Fla.)		–		–	14	–	12	.538
Oklahoma City		–		–	14	–	12	.538
Xavier		–		–	14	–	12	.538
Penn State		–		–	12	–	11	.522
Pittsburgh		–		–	12	–	11	.522
Idaho		–		–	13	–	13	.500
Loyola (La.)		–		–	12	–	13	.480
Army		–		–	10	–	11	.476
Regis		–		–	10	–	11	.476
Montana State		–		–	10	–	13	.435
Iona		–		–	8	–	11	.421
Colgate		–		–	8	–	15	.348
Oregon		–		–	9	–	17	.346
Portland		–		–	8	–	18	.308
Washington State		–		–	8	–	18	.308
Notre Dame		–		–	7	–	16	.304
Boston University		–		–	5	–	15	.250
Syracuse		–		–	2	–	22	.083
Rankings from AP Poll

The 1961–62 Houston Cougars men's basketball team represented the University of Houston in NCAA University Division competition in the 1961–62 season.

Houston, coached by Guy Lewis, played its home games in Jeppesen Fieldhouse in Houston, Texas, and was then an Independent.

== Roster ==
1961–62 Houston Cougars men's basketball team
Players
Coaches

Pos.	#	Name	Height	Weight	Year	Previous school	Hometown
G	30	Don Schverak	6 ft 4 in (1.93 m)	—	So	Reagan HS	Houston, Texas
F	42	Lyle Harger	6 ft 7 in (2.01 m)	220 lb (100 kg)	Jr		Lubbock, Texas

Head coach

- Guy Lewis (Houston)

Assistant coach(es)

- Harvey Pate (Oklahoma State)

Legend

- (C) Team captain
- (S) Suspended
- (I) Ineligible
- (W) Walk-on
- Injured
- Current redshirt

Roster

== Schedule and results ==
Date time, TV	Opponent	Result	Record	Site city, state
Regular season
Dec 1, 1961	UC Davis	W 95–47	1–0	Jeppesen Fieldhouse; Houston, Texas
Dec 5, 1961	at Texas A&M	L 49–64	1–1	G. Rollie White Coliseum; College Station, Texas
Dec 7, 1961	at Lamar Tech	W 72–70 ^{OT}	2–1	McDonald Gym; Beaumont, Texas
Dec 12, 1961	TCU	W 75–70	3–1	Jeppesen Fieldhouse; Houston, Texas
Dec 15, 1961	vs. No. 10 Seattle; City of Roses Tournament	L 63–66	3–2	Howard Hall; Portland, Oregon
Dec 16, 1961	at Portland; City of Roses Tournament	W 67–55	4–2	Howard Hall; Portland, Oregon
Dec 20, 1961	Ole Miss	W 63–62 ^{2OT}	5–2	Jeppesen Fieldhouse; Houston, Texas
Dec 22, 1961	UCLA; Lions’ Club Tournament	W 91–65	6–2	Jeppesen Fieldhouse; Houston, Texas
Dec 23, 1961	Auburn; Lions’ Club Tournament	W 54–49	7–2	Jeppesen Fieldhouse; Houston, Texas
Dec 26, 1961	vs. TCU; All-College Tournament	W 82–76	8–2	Frederickson Fieldhouse; Oklahoma City, Oklahoma
Dec 28, 1961	vs. Utah State; All-College Tournament	W 51–46	9–2	Frederickson Fieldhouse; Oklahoma City, Oklahoma
Dec 29, 1961	vs. Bowling Green; All-College Tournament	L 45–47	9–3	Frederickson Fieldhouse; Oklahoma City, Oklahoma
Jan 3, 1962	at North Texas State	W 57–44	10–3	Men's Gymnasium; Denton, Texas
Jan 5, 1962	at Loyola (LA)	W 68–57	11–3	Loyola Field House; New Orleans, Louisiana
Jan 11, 1962	at Tulsa	W 69–61	12–3	Tulsa Fairgrounds Pavilion; Tulsa, Oklahoma
Jan 15, 1962	Lamar Tech	W 86–64	13–3	Jeppesen Fieldhouse; Houston, Texas
Jan 25, 1962	at TCU	W 61–56	14–3	Daniel–Meyer Coliseum; Fort Worth, Texas
Jan 30, 1962	Texas A&M	W 73–69	15–3	Jeppesen Fieldhouse; Houston, Texas
Feb 1, 1962	No. 3 Cincinnati	L 52–60	15–4	Jeppesen Fieldhouse; Houston, Texas
Feb 5, 1962	Florida State	W 84–76	16–4	Jeppesen Fieldhouse; Houston, Texas
Feb 8, 1962	Miami (FL)	W 80–69	17–4	Jeppesen Fieldhouse; Houston, Texas
Feb 10, 1962	North Texas State	W 105–75	18–4	Jeppesen Fieldhouse; Houston, Texas
Feb 16, 1962	at No. 3 Cincinnati	L 47–59	18–5	Armory Fieldhouse; Cincinnati, Ohio
Feb 20, 1962	Tulsa	W 98–71	19–5	Jeppesen Fieldhouse; Houston, Texas
Feb 23, 1962	USC	W 56–51	20–5	Jeppesen Fieldhouse; Houston, Texas
Feb 24, 1962	USC	W 76–68	21–5	Jeppesen Fieldhouse; Houston, Texas
NIT
Mar 17, 1962	Dayton; Quarterfinals	L 77–94	21–6	Madison Square Garden; New York City, New York
*Non-conference game. ^{#}Rankings from AP Poll. (#) Tournament seedings in parentheses. All times are in Central Time.

== Rankings ==
Ranking movements Legend: ██ Increase in ranking ██ Decrease in ranking — = Not ranked
	Week														
Poll	Pre	1	2	3	4	5	6	7	8	9	10	11	12	13	Final
AP	—	—	—	—	—	—	—	—	—	—	—	—	—	—	—
Coaches	—	—	—	—	—	—	—	—	19	—	—	—	16	—	—
