= 1961–62 UCLA Bruins men's basketball team =

American college basketball season

1961–62 UCLA Bruins men's basketball
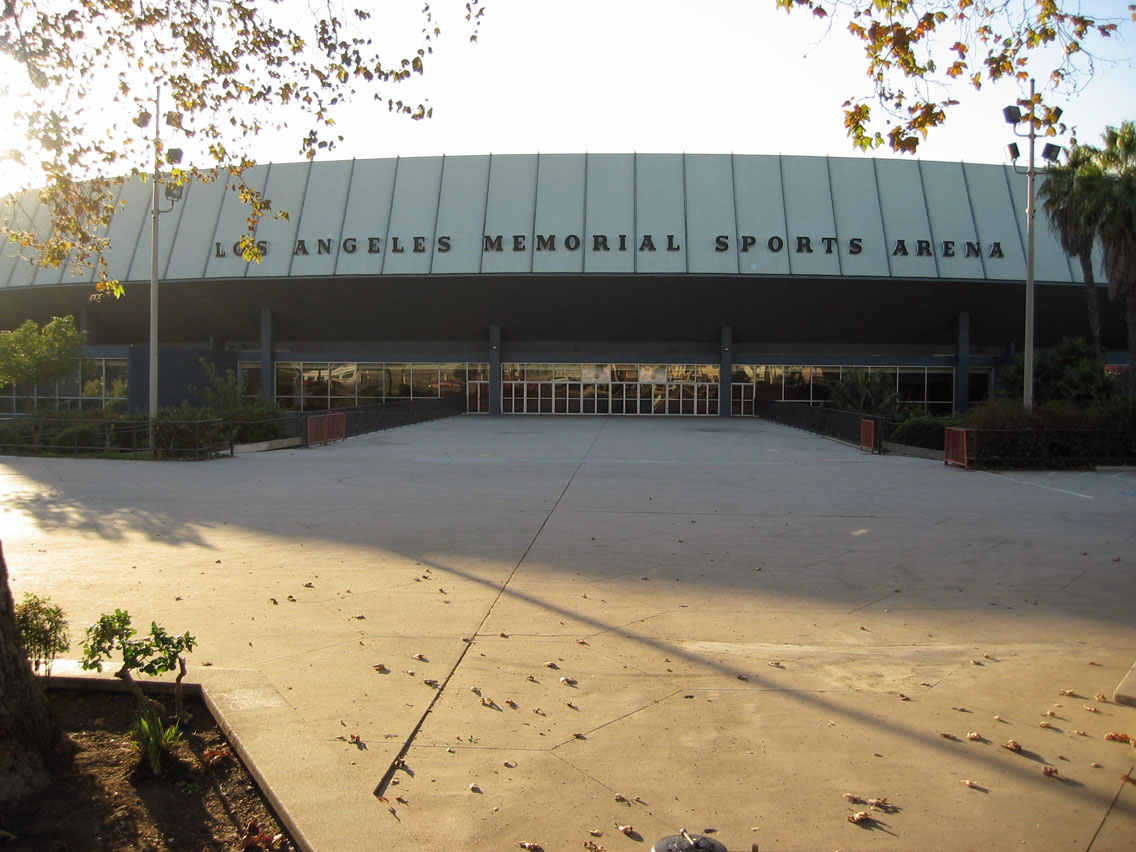

Los Angeles Classic champions AAWU regular season champions

NCAA tournament, Final Four
- Conference: Athletic Association of Western Universities

Ranking
- Coaches: No. 17
- Record: 18–11 (10–2 (1st) Big Six)
- Head coach: John R. Wooden (14th season)
- Assistant coach: Jerry Norman
- Home arena: Los Angeles Memorial Sports Arena; Los Angeles, California

1961–62 AAWU Conference men's basketball standings
	Conf.				Overall
Team	W		L	PCT	W		L	PCT
UCLA	10	–	2	.833	18	–	11	.621
Stanford	8	–	4	.667	16	–	6	.727
Washington	5	–	7	.417	16	–	10	.615
USC	5	–	7	.417	14	–	11	.560
California	2	–	10	.167	8	–	17	.320
Rankings from AP Poll

The 1961–62 UCLA basketball team was coached by John Wooden in his 14th year. The Bruins finished 1st in the AAWU (10–2), and accepted a bid to the 1962 NCAA Tournament. The Bruins won the NCAA Far West Regional and played in the Final Four, the first in the school's history and the first of 12 for coach John Wooden. UCLA lost 72–70 to Cincinnati and then in the third-place game on March 24, 1962, in Louisville, Ky. (Freedom Hall), Wake Forest defeated UCLA 82–80. The Bruins finished the season as the 4th best team in the nation.

== Roster ==
1961–62 UCLA Bruins men's basketball team
Players
Coaches

Pos.	#	Name	Height	Weight	Year	Hometown
F	52	Pete Blackman	6 ft 5 in (1.96 m)	—	Sr
F	55	Gary Cunningham (C)	6 ft 6 in (1.98 m)	—	Sr
G	22	Larry Gower	5 ft 11 in (1.8 m)	—
G	45	John Green (C)	6 ft 2 in (1.88 m)	—	Sr
F	25	Rich Gugat	6 ft 2 in (1.88 m)	—
G	42	Walt Hazzard	6 ft 2 in (1.88 m)	185 lb (84 kg)	So	Wilmington, Delaware
G	24	Bill Hicks	6 ft 2 in (1.88 m)	—
G	20	Mike Huggins	5 ft 11 in (1.8 m)	—
G	44	Jim Milhorn	5 ft 10 in (1.78 m)	—
G	30	Jim Rosvall	6 ft 3 in (1.91 m)	—
C	35	Fred Slaughter	6 ft 5 in (1.96 m)	—	So
C	34	Kim Stewart	6 ft 4 in (1.93 m)	—
F	32	Dave Waxman	6 ft 6 in (1.98 m)	—

Head coach

John Wooden (Purdue)

Assistant coach(es)

Legend

- (C) Team captain
- (S) Suspended
- (I) Ineligible
- (W) Walk-on
- Injured
- Current redshirt

Roster
Last update: 18 October 2017

== Schedule ==
Date time, TV	Rank^{#}	Opponent^{#}	Result	Record	Site city, state
Regular Season
December 1, 1961*		at BYU	L 66–68	0–1	Smith Fieldhouse; Provo, UT
December 2, 1961*		at BYU	L 83–86	0–2	Smith Fieldhouse; Provo, UT
December 9, 1961*		Kansas	W 69–61	1–2	Los Angeles Memorial Sports Arena; Los Angeles, CA
December 15, 1961*		DePauw	W 91–62	2–2	Los Angeles Memorial Sports Arena; Los Angeles, CA
December 16, 1961*		Colorado State	L 68–69	2–3	Los Angeles Memorial Sports Arena; Los Angeles, CA
December 20, 1961*		at Creighton	L 72–74	2–4	Omaha Civic Auditorium; Omaha, NE
December 22, 1961*		at Houston; Houston Holiday Classic	L 65–91	2–5	Jeppesen Gymnasium; Houston, TX
December 23, 1961*		vs. Texas A&M; Houston Holiday Classic	W 81–71	3–5	Jeppesen Gymnasium; Houston, TX
December 27, 1961*		Army; Los Angeles Classic	W 86–72	4–5	Los Angeles Memorial Sports Arena; Los Angeles, CA
December 28, 1961*		No. 1 Ohio State; Los Angeles Classic	L 84–105	4–6	Los Angeles Memorial Sports Arena; Los Angeles, CA
December 29, 1961*		Utah; Los Angeles Classic	L 79–88	4–7	Los Angeles Memorial Sports Arena; Los Angeles, CA
January 5, 1962		Washington	W 72–57	5–7 (1–0)	Los Angeles Memorial Sports Arena; Los Angeles, CA
January 6, 1962		Washington	W 75–63	6–7 (2–0)	Los Angeles Memorial Sports Arena; Los Angeles, CA
January 13, 1962		at California	W 71–60	7–7 (3–0)	Harmon Gym; Berkeley, CA
January 26, 1962*		Texas Tech	W 89–60	8–7	Santa Monica City College; Santa Monica, CA
January 27, 1962*		Texas Tech	W 87–58	9–7	Santa Monica City College; Santa Monica, CA
February 2, 1962		No. 5 USC	W 73–59	10–7 (4–0)	Los Angeles Memorial Sports Arena; Los Angeles, CA
February 10, 1962		Stanford	W 82–64	11–7 (5–0)	Los Angeles Memorial Sports Arena; Los Angeles, CA
February 16, 1962		USC	L 60–74	11–8 (5–1)	Los Angeles Memorial Sports Arena; Los Angeles, CA
February 17, 1962		USC	W 69–62	12–8 (6–1)	Los Angeles Memorial Sports Arena; Los Angeles, CA
February 23, 1962		California	W 68–62	13–8 (7–1)	Los Angeles Memorial Sports Arena; Los Angeles, CA
February 24, 1962		Stanford	W 75–65	14–8 (8–1)	Los Angeles Memorial Sports Arena; Los Angeles, CA
March 2, 1962		at Washington	W 69–66	15–8 (9–1)	Hec Edmundson Pavilion; Seattle, WA
March 9, 1962		at Stanford	L 67–82	15–9 (9–2)	Stanford Pavilion; Stanford, CA
March 10, 1962		at California	W 66–54	16–9 (10–2)	Harmon Gym; Berkeley, CA
NCAA Tournament
March 16, 1962*		vs. Utah State; Regional semifinal	W 73–62	17–9	Smith Fieldhouse (10,186); Provo, UT
March 17, 1962*		vs. Oregon State; Regional Final	W 88–69	18–9	Smith Fieldhouse (9,826); Provo, UT
March 23, 1962*		vs. No. 2 Cincinnati; National semifinal	L 70–72	18–10	Freedom Hall (18,274); Louisville, KY
March 24, 1962*		vs. Wake Forest; National third-place game	L 80–82	18–11	Freedom Hall; Louisville, KY
*Non-conference game. ^{#}Rankings from AP Poll. (#) Tournament seedings in parentheses. All times are in Pacific Time.
