= George Ireland =

American basketball player-coach

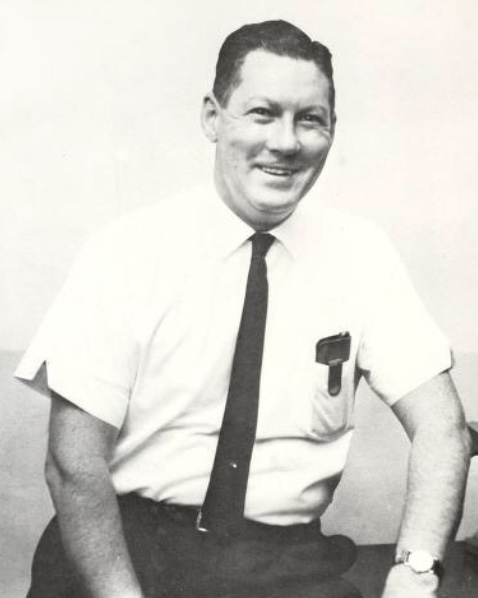
- Ireland from the 1963 Loyolan

Biographical details
- Born: June 15, 1913; Madison, Wisconsin, U.S.
- Died: September 14, 2001 (aged 88); Addison, Illinois, U.S.

Playing career
- 1933–1936: Notre Dame

Coaching career (HC unless noted)
- 1936–1951: Marmion Academy (IL)
- 1951–1975: Loyola (IL)

Administrative career (AD unless noted)
- 1956–1978: Loyola (IL)

Head coaching record
- Overall: 318–255 (college)
- Tournaments: 7–3 (NCAA); 2–1 (NIT)

Accomplishments and honors

Championships
- NCAA University Division tournament (1963)

George Ireland (June 15, 1913 – September 14, 2001) was an American basketball coach who led the Loyola Ramblers to the 1963 NCAA championship.

== Background ==
Born in Madison, Wisconsin, Ireland was an All-American basketball player at the University of Notre Dame during the 1930s. Ireland once noted with amusement that Kentucky coach Adolph Rupp once called him the "dirtiest player in the game" after he had punched one of his players right in front of the bench.

Ireland had his first coaching job at Marmion Academy in Aurora, Illinois, which he led to 262–87 record from 1936 to 1951. In 1951, he succeeded John Jordan, a former teammate at Notre Dame, as head coach at Loyola University Chicago, and he remained at Loyola until 1975. Ireland encouraged full-court press and a high-speed style of play while recruiting heavily in the South. He described himself as a "butt-kicker" that pushed heavily on conditioning, complete with practice that had players rebound with weights on their ankles and shooting at rims smaller in circumference for accuracy while stressing tight defense and "organized confusion" on offense.

In 1962, he became the first coach of a major NCAA program to use five African American players in a game at the same time. This was particularly notable at the time, as some schools refused to play against a team with even one black player. A man described as a loner, one of his player noted that one time in a player meeting at the gym, Ireland stated that "The most important thing is for you to get an education, play some ball and get out of here....I don't want you as my friends...You don't have to like me, and I don't have to like you."

== 1963 championship ==
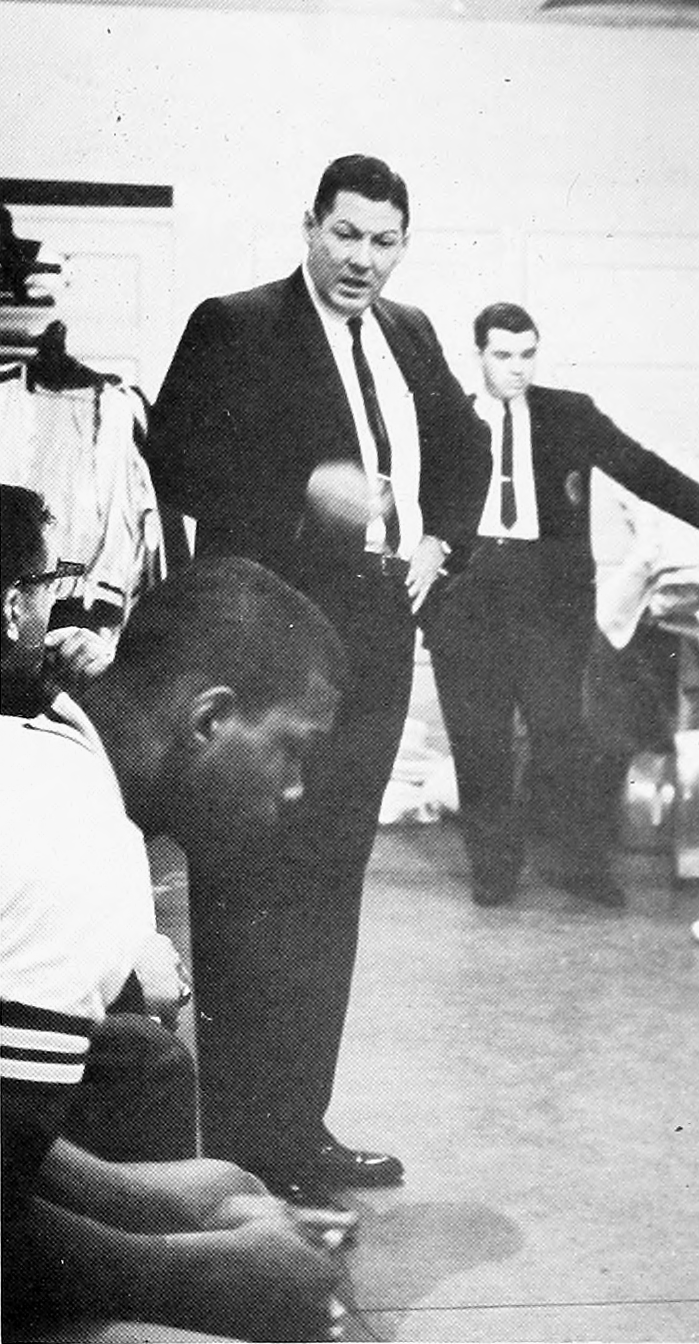
Ireland during halftime of a 1962–63 season game

The highlight of Ireland's coaching career occurred in 1963, when he guided the Loyola Ramblers to the national collegiate championship. Ireland's team, led by Jerry Harkness and Les Hunter, compiled a 23–2 regular season record and finished first in the country in scoring, averaging 93.9 points per game. They defeated Tennessee Tech 111–42 in the first round of the NCAA tournament, which is still the largest margin of victory in an NCAA tournament game. After victories over Mississippi State, Illinois and Duke, the Ramblers reached the finals, where they faced two-time defending champion Cincinnati. Loyola trailed Cincinnati 45-30 with 13:56 left in the game, but the Ramblers rallied to force an overtime session with pressing defense and a last-minute jump shot by Harkness. In overtime, they won the game 60–58 with a last-second tip-in by Vic Rouse. Loyola remains the only school in the state of Illinois to have won an NCAA Division I basketball championship. The 1963 Loyola team also broke racial barriers by being the first NCAA Division I team to have four African-American players in the everyday lineup. Over twenty years later, Ireland reflected on the team, calling them "An extraordinary group of young men. All intelligent, all willing, all good at what they did. They were not great players, but they were a great team."

On July 11, 2013, surviving members of Loyola's team were honored by President Barack Obama at the White House to celebrate the 50th anniversary of the school's championship. Ireland was represented at the Oval Office ceremony by his daughter, Judy van Dyck, and by Loyola's current head coach, Porter Moser.

== Later career ==
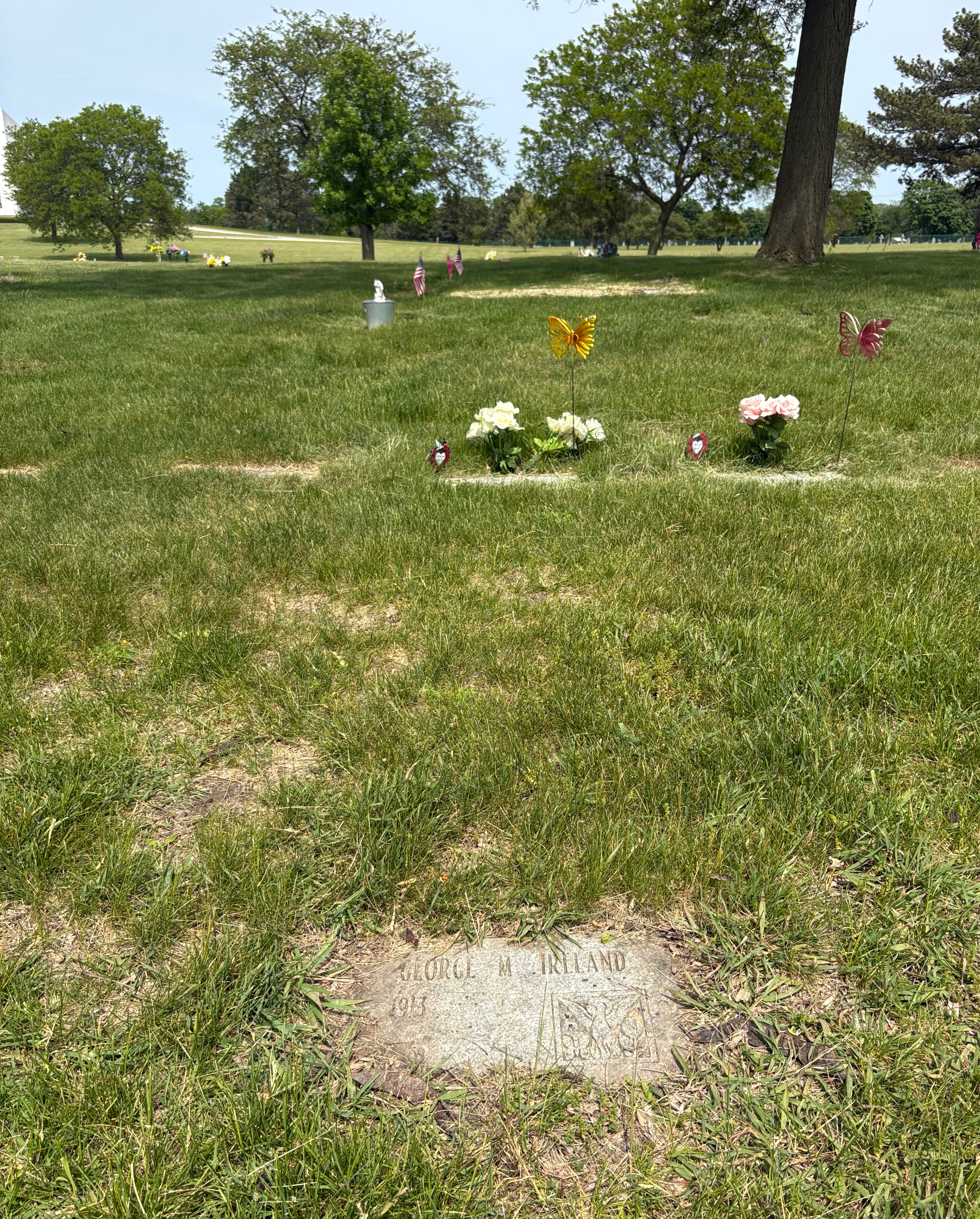
Ireland's grave at All Saints Cemetery

Under Ireland, the Loyola Ramblers returned to the NCAA tournament in 1964, 1966, and 1968, although they never repeated the success of 1963. During the late 1960s and early 1970s, Ireland coached LaRue Martin, who became the first overall pick of the 1972 NBA draft. However, Martin's NBA career lasted just four seasons, prompting analysts to call him one of the biggest busts in NBA history. Ireland retired in January 1975, 14 games into the 1974–75 season, with a 321–255 record, good for a .557 winning percentage. He later worked as a volunteer coach for children with intellectual and developmental disabilities at the Center for Enriched Living in Skokie, Illinois. He led them to an undefeated inaugural season in 1979. On September 14, 2001, he died at the age of 88 in Addison, Illinois. He was buried at All Saints Cemetery in Des Plaines.

== Head coaching record ==
Record table
Season	Team	Overall	Conference	Standing	Postseason
Loyola–Chicago Ramblers (Independent) (1951–1975)
1951–52	Loyola–Chicago	17–8	–		
1952–53	Loyola–Chicago	8–15	–		
1953–54	Loyola–Chicago	7–15	–		
1954–55	Loyola–Chicago	13–11	–		
1955–56	Loyola–Chicago	10–14	–		
1956–57	Loyola–Chicago	14–10	–		
1957–58	Loyola–Chicago	16–8	–		
1958–59	Loyola–Chicago	11–13	–		
1959–60	Loyola–Chicago	10–12	–		
1960–61	Loyola–Chicago	15–8	–		
1961–62	Loyola–Chicago	23–4	–		NIT Third Place
1962–63	Loyola–Chicago	29–2	–		NCAA University Division Champion
1963–64	Loyola–Chicago	22–6	–		NCAA University Division Regional Semifinals
1964–65	Loyola–Chicago	11–14	–		
1965–66	Loyola–Chicago	22–3	–		NCAA University Division first round
1966–67	Loyola–Chicago	13–9	–		
1967–68	Loyola–Chicago	15–9	–		NCAA University Division first round
1968–69	Loyola–Chicago	9–14	–		
1969–70	Loyola–Chicago	13–11	–		
1970–71	Loyola–Chicago	4–20	–		
1971–72	Loyola–Chicago	8–14	–		
1972–73	Loyola–Chicago	8–15	–		
1973–74	Loyola–Chicago	12–14	–		
1974–75	Loyola–Chicago	8–6	–		
Loyola–Chicago:		318–255			
Total:		318–255			
National champion Postseason invitational champion Conference regular season champion Conference regular season and conference tournament champion Division regular season champion Division regular season and conference tournament champion Conference tournament champion

== See also ==
- Black participation in college basketball
- List of NCAA Division I Men's Final Four appearances by coach
