= Bob Spear (basketball) =

American basketball coach

Biographical details
- Born: July 8, 1918; Mansfield, Ohio, U.S.
- Died: October 26, 1995 (aged 77); Tucson, Arizona, U.S.
- Education: DePauw

Coaching career (HC unless noted)
- 1956–1971: Air Force

Head coaching record
- Overall: 177–175

Robert B. Spear (July 8, 1918 – October 26, 1995) was an American basketball coach. He served as the head basketball coach at United States Air Force Academy from the inception of the Air Force Falcons men's basketball program in 1956 until 1971. He was a graduate of DePauw University.

== Head coaching record ==
Record table
Season	Team	Overall	Conference	Standing	Postseason
Air Force Falcons (NCAA University Division independent) (1956–1971)
1956–57	Air Force	11–10			
1957–58	Air Force	17–6			
1958–59	Air Force	14–9			
1959–60	Air Force	12–10			NCAA University Division First Round
1960–61	Air Force	12–12			
1961–62	Air Force	16–7			NCAA University Division First Round
1962–63	Air Force	10–12			
1963–64	Air Force	11–12			
1964–65	Air Force	9–14			
1965–66	Air Force	14–12			
1966–67	Air Force	6–18			
1967–68	Air Force	10–14			
1968–69	Air Force	11–13			
1969–70	Air Force	12–12			
1970–71	Air Force	12–14			
Air Force:		177–175			
Total:		177–175			
