= 1962 NCAA University Division basketball championship game =

1962 NCAA Tournament Championship Game
National championship game
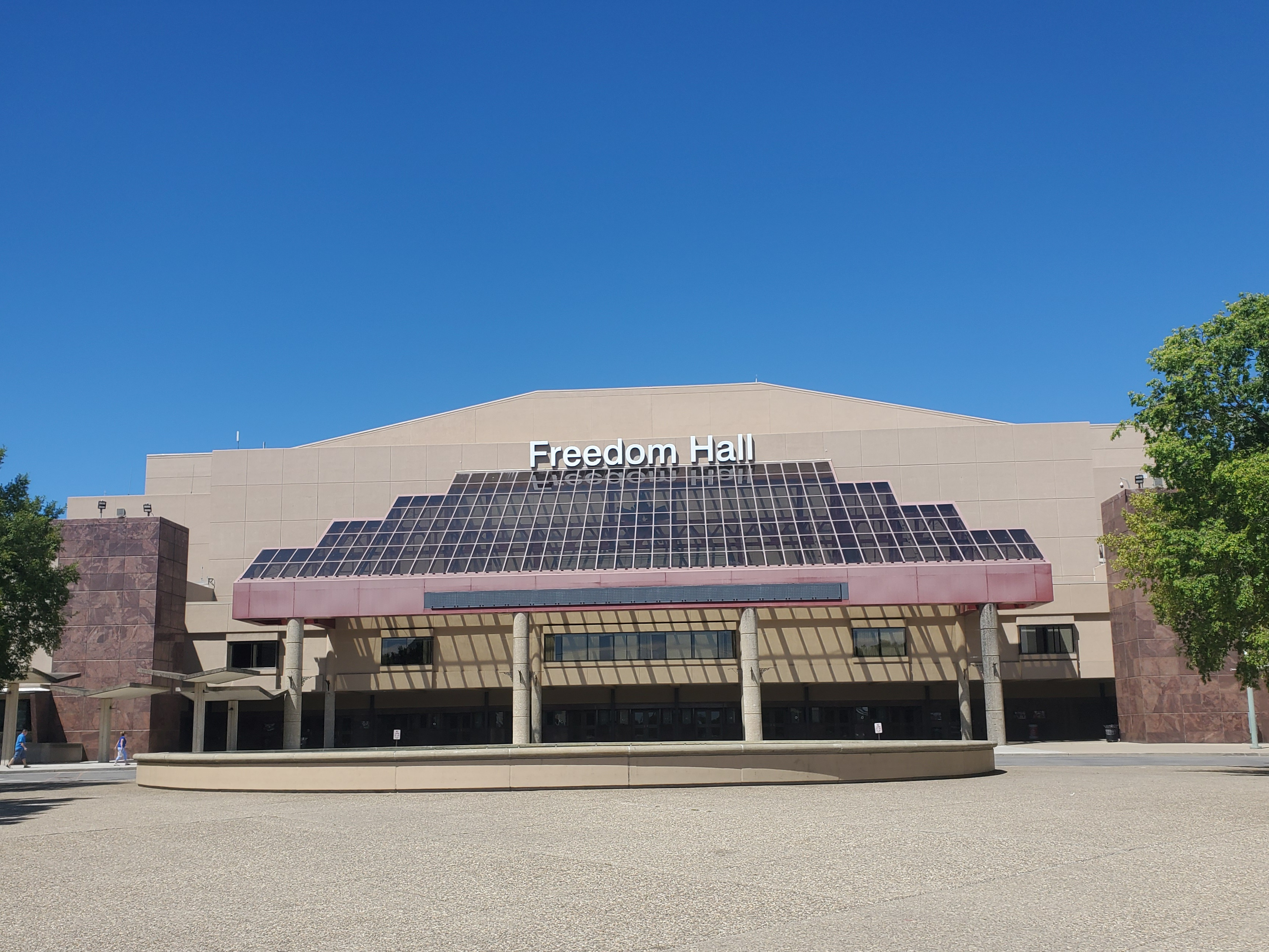
- Freedom Hall in Louisville, Kentucky, hosted the championship game.
Ohio State Buckeyes	Cincinnati Bearcats
Big Ten	MVC
(26-1)	(28-2)
59	71
Head coach: Fred Taylor	Head coach: Ed Jucker
- AP: 1
- Coaches: 1
- AP: 2
- Coaches: 2
	1st half	2nd half	Total
Ohio State Buckeyes	29	30	59
Cincinnati Bearcats	37	34	71
- Date: March 24, 1962
- Venue: Freedom Hall, Louisville, Kentucky
- MVP: Paul Hogue, Cincinnati
- Attendance: 18,469

The 1962 NCAA University Division Basketball Championship Game was the finals of the 1962 NCAA University Division basketball tournament and it determined the national champion for the 1961-62 NCAA University Division men's basketball season. The game was played on March 24, 1962, at Freedom Hall in Louisville, Kentucky. It featured the top-ranked Ohio State Buckeyes of the Big Ten Conference, and the second-ranked and defending national champion Cincinnati Bearcats of the Missouri Valley Conference in an all-Ohio matchup for the second consecutive year.

This was Ohio State's last appearance in the championship game until 2007. As of 2026, this is the last time that the national championship game featured two teams from the same state, and was the last national championship game rematch in the tournament until 2022.

== Participating teams ==
=== Ohio State Buckeyes ===
- Mideast
  - Ohio State 93, Western Kentucky 73
  - Ohio State 74, Kentucky 64
- Final Four
  - Ohio State 84, Wake Forest 68

=== Cincinnati Bearcats ===
- Midwest
  - Cincinnati 66, Creighton 46
  - Cincinnati 73, Colorado 46
- Final Four
  - Cincinnati 72, UCLA 70

== Game summary ==
March 24, 1962

#2 Cincinnati Bearcats 71, #1 Ohio State Buckeyes 59
Scoring by half: 37-29, 34-30
Pts: Paul Hogue 22; Rebs: Paul Hogue 19	Pts: Gary Bradds 15; Rebs: Jerry Lucas 16

Freedom Hall, Louisville, Kentucky
Attendance: 18,469
