= 1961–62 Washington Huskies men's basketball team =

American college basketball season

1961–62 Washington Huskies men's basketball
- Conference: Athletic Association of Western Universities
- Record: 16–10 (5–7 AAWU, Big Five)
- Head coach: John Grayson (3rd season)
- Assistant coach: Mac Duckworth
- Home arena: Hec Edmundson Pavilion

1961–62 AAWU Conference men's basketball standings
	Conf.				Overall
Team	W		L	PCT	W		L	PCT
UCLA	10	–	2	.833	18	–	11	.621
Stanford	8	–	4	.667	16	–	6	.727
Washington	5	–	7	.417	16	–	10	.615
USC	5	–	7	.417	14	–	11	.560
California	2	–	10	.167	8	–	17	.320
Rankings from AP Poll

The 1961–62 Washington Huskies men's basketball team represented the University of Washington for the 1961–62 NCAA University Division basketball season. Led by third-year head coach John Grayson, the Huskies were members of the Athletic Association of Western Universities (Big Five) and played their home games on campus at Hec Edmundson Pavilion in Seattle, Washington.

The Huskies were 16–10 overall in the regular season and 5–7 in conference play, tied for third in the standings.
