= 1961–62 Cincinnati Bearcats men's basketball team =

American college basketball season

1961–62 Cincinnati Bearcats men's basketball
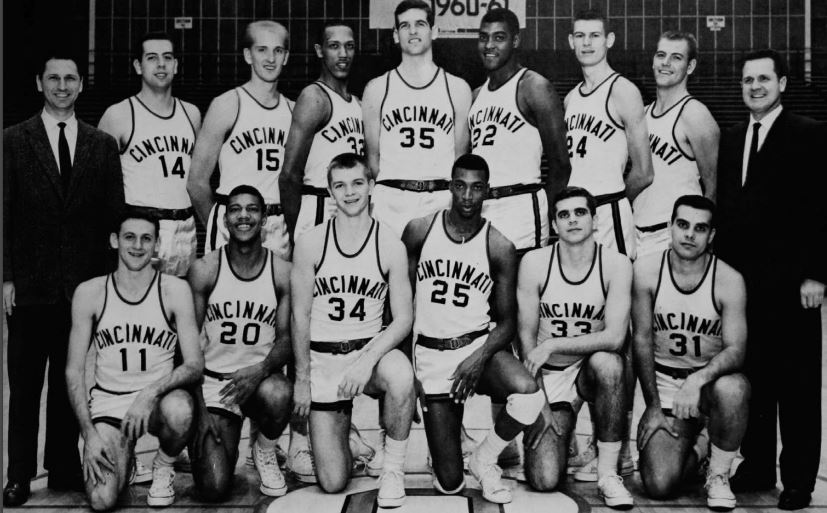

NCAA tournament National champions MVC Co-champions

National Championship Game, W 71–59 vs. Ohio State
- Conference: Missouri Valley Conference

Ranking
- Coaches: No. 2
- AP: No. 2
- Record: 29–2 (10–2 MVC)
- Head coach: Ed Jucker (2nd season)
- Assistant coach: Tay Baker
- Home arena: Armory Fieldhouse

1961–62 Missouri Valley Conference men's basketball standings
	Conf.				Overall
Team	W		L	PCT	W		L	PCT
No. 2 Cincinnati	10	–	2	.833	29	–	2	.935
No. 5 Bradley	10	–	2	.833	21	–	7	.750
Wichita Municipal	7	–	5	.583	18	–	9	.667
Drake	6	–	6	.500	16	–	8	.667
Saint Louis	5	–	7	.417	11	–	15	.423
Tulsa	4	–	8	.333	7	–	19	.269
North Texas State	0	–	12	.000	3	–	23	.115
Rankings from AP Poll

The 1961–62 Cincinnati Bearcats men's basketball team represented University of Cincinnati. Cincinnati won the Missouri Valley Conference regular season title and defended its national championship with a 71–59 defeat of top-ranked in-state foe Ohio State again before 18,469 at Freedom Hall in Louisville, Kentucky. The head coach was Ed Jucker.

== Roster ==
1961–62 Cincinnati Bearcats men's basketball team
Players
Coaches

Pos.	#	Name	Height	Weight	Year	Previous school	Hometown
G	11	Larry Shingleton	5 ft 10 in (1.78 m)	—	Jr	Madison	Madison, Indiana
F	14	Bill Abernethy	6 ft 5 in (1.96 m)	—	So	Wyoming	Cincinnati, Ohio
F	15	Fred Dierking	6 ft 6 in (1.98 m)	—	Sr	Valley Stream Central	Valley Stream, New York
G	20	Tony Yates	6 ft 1 in (1.85 m)	—	Jr	Lockland Wayne	Lawrenceburg, Indiana
F	21	Ron Bonham	6 ft 5 in (1.96 m)	192 lb (87 kg)	So	Muncie Central	Muncie, Indiana
C	22	Paul Hogue	6 ft 9 in (2.06 m)	240 lb (109 kg)	Sr	Austin	Knoxville, Tennessee
F	24	Dale Heidotting	6 ft 8 in (2.03 m)	—	Jr	Greenhills	Greenhills, Ohio
G	25	Tom Thacker	6 ft 2 in (1.88 m)	170 lb (77 kg)	Jr	William Grant	Covington, Kentucky
G	31	Jim Calhoun	6 ft 0 in (1.83 m)	—	Sr	Carr Creek	Carr Creek, Kentucky
C	32	George Wilson	6 ft 8 in (2.03 m)	225 lb (102 kg)	So	John Marshall	Chicago, Illinois
G	33	Tom Sizer	6 ft 2 in (1.88 m)	—	Sr	Middletown	Middletown, Ohio
G	34	Larry Elsasser	6 ft 2 in (1.88 m)	—	So	Central	Cincinnati, Ohio
C	35	Ron Reis	6 ft 10 in (2.08 m)	—	Sr	Woodward	Cincinnati, Ohio

Head coach

- Ed Jucker (Cincinnati)

Assistant coach(es)

- Tay Baker (Cincinnati)

Legend

- (C) Team captain
- (S) Suspended
- (I) Ineligible
- (W) Walk-on
- Injured
- Current redshirt

Roster
Last update: April 17, 2020

== Schedule ==
Date time, TV	Rank^{#}	Opponent^{#}	Result	Record	Site city, state
Regular Season
December 2, 1961*	No. 2	Indiana State	W 63–30	1–0	Armory Fieldhouse; Cincinnati, OH
December 5, 1961*	No. 2	Miami (OH)	W 63–30	2–0	Cincinnati Gardens; Cincinnati, OH
December 6, 1960*	No. 2	at Wisconsin	W 86–67	3–0	Wisconsin Field House; Madison, WI
December 11, 1961	No. 2	at Drake	W 60–59	4–0 (1–0)	Veterans Memorial Auditorium; Des Moines, IA
December 16, 1961*	No. 2	Marshall	W 77–49	5–0	Armory Fieldhouse; Cincinnati, OH
December 18, 1961	No. 2	at Wichita State	L 51–52	5–1 (1–1)	Levitt Arena; Wichita, KS
December 21, 1961*	No. 2	Colorado	W 84–67	6–1	Armory Fieldhouse; Cincinnati, OH
December 26, 1961*	No. 2	vs. St. John's; Holiday Festival	W 97–68	7–1	Madison Square Garden; New York, NY
December 28, 1961*	No. 2	vs. La Salle; Holiday Festival	W 64–56	8–1	Madison Square Garden; New York, NY
December 30, 1961*	No. 2	vs. Wisconsin; Holiday Festival	W 101–71	9–1	Madison Square Garden; New York, NY
January 4, 1962	No. 2	Saint Louis	W 62–47	10–1 (2–1)	Armory Fieldhouse; Cincinnati, OH
January 6, 1962	No. 2	Tulsa	W 72–43	11–1 (3–1)	Armory Fieldhouse; Cincinnati, OH
January 10, 1962	No. 2	at Bradley	L 68–70 ^{OT}	11–2 (3–2)	Robertson Memorial Field House; Peoria, IL
January 16, 1962*	No. 3	Dayton	W 80–61	12–2	Cincinnati Gardens; Cincinnati, OH
January 18, 1962*	No. 3	at No. 5 Duquesne	W 62–54	13–2	Duquesne Gymnasium; Pittsburgh, PA
January 25, 1962	No. 3	North Texas	W 89–61	14–2 (4–2)	Armory Fieldhouse; Cincinnati, OH
January 30, 1962	No. 3	Drake	W 73–52	15–2 (5–2)	Armory Fieldhouse; Cincinnati, OH
February 1, 1962*	No. 3	at Houston	W 60–52	16–2	Jeppesen Field House; Houston, TX
February 3, 1962	No. 3	at North Texas	W 77–50	17–2 (6–2)	North Texas Men's Gym; Denton, TX
February 8, 1962	No. 3	at Saint Louis	W 54–48	18–2 (7–2)	Kiel Auditorium; Saint Louis, MO
February 10, 1962	No. 3	at Tulsa	W 70–52	19–2 (8–2)	Expo Square Pavilion; Tulsa, OK
February 12, 1962*	No. 3	George Washington	W 83–43	20–2	Armory Fieldhouse; Cincinnati, OH
February 16, 1962*	No. 3	Houston	W 59–47	21–2	Armory Fieldhouse; Cincinnati, OH
February 19, 1962	No. 3	No. 5 Bradley	W 72–57	22–2 (9–2)	Armory Fieldhouse; Cincinnati, OH
February 24, 1962	No. 2	Wichita State	W 84–63	23–2 (10–2)	Armory Fieldhouse; Cincinnati, OH
March 1, 1962*	No. 2	Xavier; Crosstown Shootout	W 61–58	24–2	Cincinnati Gardens; Cincinnati, OH
March 12, 1962	No. 2	vs. No. 6 Bradley; Missouri Valley Conference Playoff	W 61–46	25–2 (11–2)	Roberts Memorial Fieldhouse; Evansville, IN
NCAA Tournament
March 16*	No. 2	vs. Creighton; Midwest Region Semifinals	W 66–46	26–2	Ahearn Field House; Manhattan, KS
March 17*	No. 2	vs. No. 9 Colorado; Midwest Region Finals	W 73–46	27–2	Ahearn Field House; Manhattan, KS
March 23*	No. 2	vs. UCLA; Final Four	W 72–70	28–2	Freedom Hall; Louisville, KY
March 24*	No. 2	vs. No. 1 Ohio State; National Championship	W 71–59	29–2	Freedom Hall; Louisville, KY
*Non-conference game. ^{#}Rankings from AP Poll. (#) Tournament seedings in parentheses.

== Awards and honors ==
=== All-American ===
- USBWA First Team: Paul Hogue
- NABC, NEA Second Team: Paul Hogue
- AP, NEA Third Team: Paul Hogue

=== National honors ===
Helms Foundation College Basketball Player of the Year: Paul Hogue

=== Missouri Valley Conference honors ===
==== All-MVC ====
- Paul Hogue
- Tom Thacker
- Ron Bonham

== NBA draft ==
Round	Pick	Player	NBA club
1	2	Paul Hogue	New York Knicks

- In the spring of 1962, Cleveland Pipers owner George Steinbrenner signed Jerry Lucas to a player-management contract worth forty thousand dollars. With the Lucas signing, Steinbrenner had a secret deal with NBA commissioner Maurice Podoloff. The Pipers would merge with the Kansas City Steers and join the NBA. A schedule was printed for the 1963–64 NBA season with the Pipers playing the New York Knicks in the first game. Steinbrenner and partner George McKean fell behind in payments to the NBA and the deal was cancelled.
