= 1961–62 St. Francis Terriers men's basketball team =

American college basketball season

1961–62 St. Francis Terriers men's basketball
- Conference: Metropolitan New York Conference
- Record: 8–15 (2–3 MTNY)
- Head coach: Daniel Lynch (14th season)
- Home arena: 69th Regiment Armory

1961–62 Metropolitan New York Conference men's basketball standings
	Conf.				Overall
Team	W		L	PCT	W		L	PCT
St. John's	5	–	0	1.000	21	–	5	.808
CCNY	2	–	1	.667	9	–	9	.500
NYU	3	–	2	.600	20	–	5	.800
St. Francis (NY)	2	–	3	.400	8	–	15	.348
Manhattan	1	–	3	.250	12	–	10	.545
Fordham	1	–	3	.250	10	–	14	.417
Brooklyn	0	–	2	.000	4	–	13	.235
Rankings from AP Poll

The 1961–62 St. Francis Terriers men's basketball team represented St. Francis College during the 1961–62 NCAA men's basketball season. The team was coached by Daniel Lynch, who was in his thirteenth year at the helm of the St. Francis Terriers. The team was a member of the Metropolitan New York Conference and played their home games at the 69th Regiment Armory in Manhattan.

The Terriers finished the season at 8–15 overall and 2–3 in conference play.

== Roster ==
1961–62 St. Francis Brooklyn Terriers men's basketball team
Players
Coaches

Pos.	#	Name	Height	Weight	Year	Previous school	Hometown
C	51	Dave Lopez	6 ft 3 in (1.91 m)	—	Sr
G	25	Tom Rooney	5 ft 10 in (1.78 m)	—
F	15	James Raferty	6 ft 3 in (1.91 m)	—	Jr
G	5	Ray Nash	6 ft 0 in (1.83 m)	—	Jr	St. Francis Preparatory School
	55	Charlie Novak	6 ft 0 in (1.83 m)	—
G	35	John Jaiser	6 ft 1 in (1.85 m)	—
G	30	Richie Alexander	5 ft 11 in (1.8 m)	—	So
	42	John O'Boyle	5 ft 9 in (1.75 m)	—	So
G	24	Jim Rishe	5 ft 10 in (1.78 m)	—	So
	32	Paul Buckley	5 ft 10 in (1.78 m)	—	So
		Ken Powers	6 ft 1 in (1.85 m)	—	So
		Joe Tennant	6 ft 2 in (1.88 m)	—	So
F	44	Tom Kurowski	6 ft 1 in (1.85 m)	—	So

Head coach

- Daniel Lynch (St. Francis '38)

Assistant coach(es)

Legend

- (C) Team captain
- (S) Suspended
- (I) Ineligible
- (W) Walk-on
- Injured
- Current redshirt

== Schedule and results ==
Date time, TV	Opponent	Result	Record	Site city, state
Regular Season
December 1, 1961*	at Hunter	W 58–51	1–0	New York, NY
December 6, 1961*	Pace	W 93–47	2–0	69th Regiment Armory; New York, NY
December 8, 1961*	at Bridgeport	L 77–87	2–1	Bridgeport, CT
December 9, 1961*	at No. 5 Providence	L 51–75	2–2	Alumni Hall; Providence, RI
December 15, 1961*	at Loyola (MD)	W 75–64	3–2	Baltimore, MD
December 16, 1961*	at Villanova	L 51–79	3–3	Palestra; Philadelphia, PA
December 18, 1961*	at Queens	W 81–75	4–3	Fitzgerald Gymnasium; Flushing, NY
January 3, 1962*	at Fairfield	L 76–88	4–4	Fairfield, CT
January 6, 1962*	Siena	W 43–39	5–4	69th Regiment Armory; New York, NY
January 10, 1962	at Manhattan	L 73–90	5–5 (0–1)	Alumni Gymnasium; Bronx, New York
January 12, 1962	at Brooklyn	W 78–47	6–5 (1–1)	Roosevelt Gymnasium; Brooklyn, NY
January 20, 1962	at St. John's	L 54–92	6–6 (1–2)	Alumni Gymnasium (3,377); Jamaica, NY
January 30, 1962*	King's (PA)	W 87–86	7–6	69th Regiment Armory; New York, NY
February 1, 1962*	at Niagara	L 53–60	7–7	Gallagher Center; Niagara Falls, NY
February 3, 1962*	at No. 7 Duquesne	L 43–99	7–8	Fitzgerald Field House; Pittsburgh, PA
February 7, 1962; 8:30 pm	C.C.N.Y	W 61–60	8–8 (2–2)	69th Regiment Armory; New York, NY
February 10, 1962*	Le Moyne	L 69–73	8–9	69th Regiment Armory; New York, NY
February 15, 1962*	at Holy Cross	L 51–85	8–10	Worcester Memorial Auditorium; Worcester, MA
February 17, 1962*	at Siena	L 52–71	8–11	Albany, NY
February 21, 1962*	Saint Peter's	L 64–66	8–12	69th Regiment Armory; New York, NY
February 24, 1962*	at NYU	L 64–69	8–13 (2–3)	Alumni Gymnasium; Bronx, NY
February 28, 1962*	at Seton Hall	L 82–100	8–14	Walsh Gymnasium; South Orange, NJ
March 3, 1962*	Iona	L 60–69	8–15	69th Regiment Armory; New York, NY
*Non-conference game. ^{#}Rankings from AP Poll. (#) Tournament seedings in parentheses. All times are in Eastern Time.
