= Arthur Schabinger =

American college football player and coach

Biographical details
- Born: August 6, 1889; Sabetha, Kansas, U.S.
- Died: October 13, 1972 (aged 83); Atlanta, Georgia, U.S.

Playing career
- c. 1910: College of Emporia
- Position: Quarterback

Coaching career (HC unless noted)

Football
- 1915–1919: Ottawa (KS)

Basketball
- 1915–1920: Ottawa (KS)
- 1920–1922: Kansas State Normal
- 1922–1935: Creighton

Head coaching record
- Overall: 10–18–6 (football); 254–98 (basketball)

Accomplishments and honors

Championships
- Basketball; 3 Kansas (1916, 1918–1919); 4 NCC (1923–1925,1927); 4 MVC (1930–1932, 1935)

Awards
- Kansas Sports Hall of Fame
- College Basketball Hall of Fame; Inducted in 2006

Arthur August Schabinger (August 6, 1889 – October 13, 1972) was an American football and basketball coach and college athletics administrator. Schabinger is credited (although disputed) with throwing the first forward pass in college football history. Even if it was not the first forward pass, most certainly Schabinger was one of the early adopters and innovators of the play.

== Basketball achievements ==
Schabinger coached college basketball for 20 seasons, including stints with Ottawa University, Emporia Teachers College and Creighton University. He was one of the founders of National Association of Basketball Coaches and the president of that organization in 1932. He authored the association's Constitution and By-Laws. He was enshrined in the Basketball Hall of Fame as a contributor in 1961.

== Football achievements ==
=== As a player ===
In 1910, Schabinger led the College of Emporia Presbies to a 17–0 victory over Washburn. During this game, he threw what some have credited (but many other records disputed) to be the first forward pass in college football history. That same year, "Schabie" scored seven touchdowns in a 107–0 win over Pittsburg Normal.

Schabinger's mentor and coach at the College of Emporia was Bill Hargiss.

=== As a coach ===
Schabinger served as the head football coach at Ottawa University in Ottawa, Kansas for four seasons, from 1915 to 1919, compiling a record of 9–17–5.

== Head coaching record ==
=== Football ===
Year	Team	Overall	Conference	Standing	Bowl/playoffs
Ottawa Braves (Kansas Collegiate Athletic Conference) (1915–1919)
1915	Ottawa	4–4–1	2–4–1	T–10th	
1916	Ottawa	2–5–2	2–5–2	T–12th	
1917	Ottawa	2–5–1	2–4–1	10th	
1918	No team—World War I				
1919	Ottawa	2–4–2	2–4–2	T–10th	
Ottawa:		10–18–6	8–17–6		
Total:		10–18–6			

=== Basketball ===
Record table
Season	Team	Overall	Conference	Standing	Postseason
Ottawa Braves (Kansas Collegiate Athletic Conference) (1915–1920)
1915–16	Ottawa	14–4		1st	
1916–17	Ottawa	12–5		2nd	
1917–18	Ottawa	16–2		1st	
1918–19	Ottawa	10–8		1st	
1919–20	Ottawa	13–4		2nd	
Ottawa:		65–23			
Kansas State Normal (Kansas Collegiate Athletic Conference) (1920–1922)
1920–21	Kansas State Normal	13–4			
1921–22	Kansas State Normal	11–5			
Kansas State Normal:		24–9			
Creighton Bluejays (North Central Conference) (1922–1927)
1922–23	Creighton	12–5	11–3	1st	
1923–24	Creighton	13–2	9–1	1st	
1924–25	Creighton	14–2	7–0	1st	
1925–26	Creighton	11–9	4–3	4th	
1926–27	Creighton	14–5	6–2	1st	
Creighton Bluejays (Independent) (1927–1928)
1927–28	Creighton	13–2			
Creighton Bluejays (Missouri Valley Conference) (1928–1935)
1928–29	Creighton	13–4	4–1	2nd	
1929–30	Creighton	12–7	6–2	T–1st	
1930–31	Creighton	8–10	5–3	T–1st	
1931–32	Creighton	17–4	8–0	1st	
1932–33	Creighton	12–5	8–2	2nd	
1933–34	Creighton	14–3	7–3	2nd	
1934–35	Creighton	12–8	8–4	T–1st	
Creighton:		165–66	83–24		
Total:		254–98			
National champion Postseason invitational champion Conference regular season champion Conference regular season and conference tournament champion Division regular season champion Division regular season and conference tournament champion Conference tournament champion
