= 1962 National Invitation Tournament =

Annual NCAA basketball competition

- Season: 1961–62
- Teams: 12
- Finals site: Madison Square Garden, New York City
- Champions: Dayton Flyers (1st title)
- Runner-up: St. John's Redmen (5th title game)
- Semifinalists: Loyola-Chicago Ramblers (3rd semifinal); Duquesne Dukes (6th semifinal)
- Winning coach: Tom Blackburn (1st title)
- MVP: Bill Chmielewski (Dayton)

The 1962 National Invitation Tournament was the 1962 edition of the annual NCAA college basketball competition.

== Selected teams ==
Below is a list of the 12 teams selected for the tournament.

- Bradley
- Colorado State
- Dayton
- Duquesne
- Holy Cross
- Houston
- Loyola-Chicago
- Navy
- Providence
- St. John's
- Temple
- Wichita State

== Bracket ==
Below is the tournament bracket.

First round
Dayton	79
Wichita State	71
Temple	80
Providence	78
Duquesne	70
Navy	58
Holy Cross	72
Colorado State	71

Quarterfinals
Dayton	94
Houston	77
Loyola-Chicago	75
Temple	64
Duquesne	88
Bradley	85
St. John's	80
Holy Cross	74

Semifinals
Dayton	98
Loyola-Chicago	82
Duquesne	65
St. John's	75

Finals
Dayton	73
St. John's	67

Third place game
Loyola-Chicago	95
Duquesne	84

== See also ==
- 1962 NCAA University Division basketball tournament
- 1962 NCAA College Division basketball tournament
- 1962 NAIA Division I men's basketball tournament
