= 1961–62 Auburn Tigers men's basketball team =

American college basketball season

1961–62 Auburn Tigers men's basketball

Birmingham Classic champions
- Conference: Southeastern Conference
- Record: 18–6 (11–3 SEC)
- Head coach: Joel Eaves (13th season)
- Captain: Bill Ross
- Home arena: Auburn Sports Arena

The 1961–62 Auburn Tigers men's basketball team represented Auburn University in the 1961–62 college basketball season. The team's head coach was Joel Eaves, who was in his thirteenth season at Auburn. The team played their home games at Auburn Sports Arena in Auburn, Alabama. They finished the season 18–6, 11–3 in SEC play.
