= 1961–62 St. John's Redmen basketball team =

American college basketball season

1961–62 St. John's Redmen men's basketball

NIT Second Place

NIT Championship vs. Dayton, L, 67-75
- Conference: Metropolitan New York Conference

Ranking
- Coaches: No. 12
- Record: 21–5 (5–0 Metro NY)
- Head coach: Joe Lapchick (17th season)
- Assistant coach: Lou Carnesecca (4th season)
- Captain: Kevin Loughery
- Home arena: Alumni Hall; Madison Square Garden

1961–62 Metropolitan New York Conference men's basketball standings
| | Conf. | | | | Overall |
| Team | W | | L | PCT | W | | L | PCT |
|---|---|---|---|---|---|---|---|---|
| St. John's | 5 | – | 0 | 1.000 | 21 | – | 5 | .808 |
| CCNY | 2 | – | 1 | .667 | 9 | – | 9 | .500 |
| NYU | 3 | – | 2 | .600 | 20 | – | 5 | .800 |
| St. Francis (NY) | 2 | – | 3 | .400 | 8 | – | 15 | .348 |
| Manhattan | 1 | – | 3 | .250 | 12 | – | 10 | .545 |
| Fordham | 1 | – | 3 | .250 | 10 | – | 14 | .417 |
| Brooklyn | 0 | – | 2 | .000 | 4 | – | 13 | .235 |
Rankings from AP Poll

The 1961–62 St. John's Redmen basketball team represented St. John's University during the 1961–62 college basketball season. The team was coached by Joe Lapchick his seventeenth year at the school. This was St. John's first season playing their home games in Alumni Hall on the new Queens campus in Hillside, NY along with a few of their major games being played in Madison Square Garden in New York, NY.

They finished with a 21–5 record and a second-place finish in the 1962 National Invitation Tournament losing Dayton in the finals.

== Roster ==
| # | Name | Height | Position | Class | Hometown | Previous Team(s) |
|---|---|---|---|---|---|---|
| 10 | Donnie Burks | 5'11" | G | Jr. | New York, NY, U.S. | Archbishop Molloy HS |
| 11 | Bill O'Sullivan | 6'7" | F/C | Jr. | N/A | N/A |
| 20 | Willie Hall | 6'4" | G/F | Sr. | New York, NY, U.S. | Archbishop Molloy HS |
| 23 | Kevin Loughery (C) | 6'3" | G | RS Sr. | Bronx, NY, U.S. | Cardinal Hayes HS/Boston College |
| 25 | LeRoy Ellis | 6'11" | C | Sr. | Brooklyn, NY, U.S. | Thomas Jefferson HS |
| 30 | Fred Edelman (DNP) | 6'4" | G/F | Sr. | Queens, NY, U.S. | Forest Hills HS |
| 33 | Ivan Kovac | 5"11" | G | Sr. | Queens, NY, U.S. | Bayside HS |
| 34 | Walt Carroll | N/A | F | Jr. | N/A | N/A |
| 35 | Frank O'Hara | 5'9" | G | Jr. | Brooklyn, NY, U.S. | Most Holy Trinity HS |
| | Dan Waddleton | 5'11" | G | So. | Jersey City, NJ, U.S. | St. Michael's HS |
| | Ralph Passante | 6'3" | G/F | So. | North Bergen, NJ, U.S. | West New York Memorial HS |

== Schedule and results ==
| Date time, TV | Rank^{#} | Opponent^{#} | Result | Record | Site city, state |
Regular Season
| December 6, 1961* | No. 9 | George Washington; First Game at Alumni Hall | W 79–65 | 1–0 | Alumni Hall; Queens, NY |
| December 12, 1961* | No. 9 | Oklahoma | W 68–49 | 2–0 | Alumni Hall; Queens, NY |
| December 15, 1961* | No. 9 | at Kansas; Sunflower Doubleheader | W 64–59 | 3–0 | Allen Fieldhouse; Lawrence, KS |
| December 16, 1961* | No. 9 | at No. 8 Kansas State; Sunflower Doubleheader | L 50–63 | 3–1 | Ahearn Field House; Manhattan, KS |
| December 20, 1961* | | Saint Joseph's | W 92–64 | 4–1 | Alumni Hall; Queens, NY |
| December 26, 1961* | | vs. No. 2 Cincinnati; ECAC Holiday Festival | L 68–97 | 4–2 | Madison Square Garden; New York, NY |
| December 28, 1961* | | vs. Dartmouth; ECAC Holiday Festival | W 71–40 | 5–2 | Madison Square Garden; New York, NY |
| December 30, 1961* | | vs. NYU; ECAC Holiday Festival | W 77–58 | 6–2 (1–0) | Madison Square Garden; New York, NY |
| January 4, 1962* | | at Temple | L 51–52 | 6–3 | The Palestra; Philadelphia, PA |
| January 6, 1962* | | Syracuse | W 84–55 | 7–3 | Alumni Hall; Queens, NY |
| January 8, 1962* | | at Bridgeport | W 108–84 | 8–3 | Harvey Hubbell Gymnasium; Bridgeport, CT |
| January 13, 1962* | | Creighton | W 72–52 | 9–3 | Alumni Hall; Queens, NY |
| January 20, 1962 | | St. Francis (NY) | W 92–54 | 10–3 (2–0) | Alumni Hall; Queens, NY |
| January 23, 1962* | | Canisius | W 81–68 | 11–3 | Alumni Hall; Queens, NY |
| January 27, 1962* | | at Loyola (IL) | L 82–92 | 11–4 | Chicago Stadium; Chicago, IL |
| January 29, 1962* | | at Notre Dame | W 78–72 ^{2OT} | 12–4 | Notre Dame Fieldhouse; South Bend, IN |
| February 3, 1962* | | at Army | W 57–51 | 13–4 | USMA Fieldhouse; West Point, NY |
| February 8, 1962* | | Villanova | W 79–66 | 14–4 | Madison Square Garden; New York, NY |
| February 10, 1962* | | at Niagara | W 67–66 ^{2OT} | 15–4 | NU Student Center; Lewiston, NY |
| February 24, 1962 | | Fordham | W 76–60 | 16–4 (3–0) | Alumni Hall; Queens, NY |
| March 3, 1962* | | Marquette | W 71–69 | 17–4 | Alumni Hall; Queens, NY |
| March 8, 1962 | | vs. Manhattan | W 88–64 | 18–4 (4–0) | Madison Square Garden; New York, NY |
| March 10, 1962 | | NYU | W 70–58 | 19–4 (5–0) | Alumni Hall; Queens, NY |
NIT
| March 20, 1962* | | vs. Holy Cross; NIT Quarterfinal | W 80-74 | 20-4 | Madison Square Garden; New York, NY |
| March 22, 1962* | | vs. Duquesne; NIT Semifinal | W 75-65 | 21-4 | Madison Square Garden; New York, NY |
| March 24, 1962* | | vs. Dayton; NIT Championship | L 67-75 | 21-5 | Madison Square Garden; New York, NY |
*Non-conference game. ^{#}Rankings from AP Poll. (#) Tournament seedings in parentheses.
