= 1961–62 Texas Tech Red Raiders basketball team =

American college basketball season

1961–62 Texas Tech Red Raiders basketball

SWC regular season co-champion

NCAA Men's Division I Basketball Tournament Sweet Sixteen, L, 67–60 v. Colorado
- Conference: Southwest Conference
- Record: 19–8 (11–3 SWC)
- Head coach: Gene Gibson (1st season)
- Home arena: Lubbock Municipal Coliseum

The 1961–62 Texas Tech Red Raiders men's basketball team represented Texas Tech University in the Southwest Conference during the 1961–62 NCAA University Division men's basketball season. The head coach was Gene Gibson, his 1st year with the team. Gibson replaced Polk Robison who became the Texas Tech athletic director. The Red Raiders played their home games in the Lubbock Municipal Coliseum in Lubbock, Texas.
