= Red McManus =

American basketball coach (1925–2013)

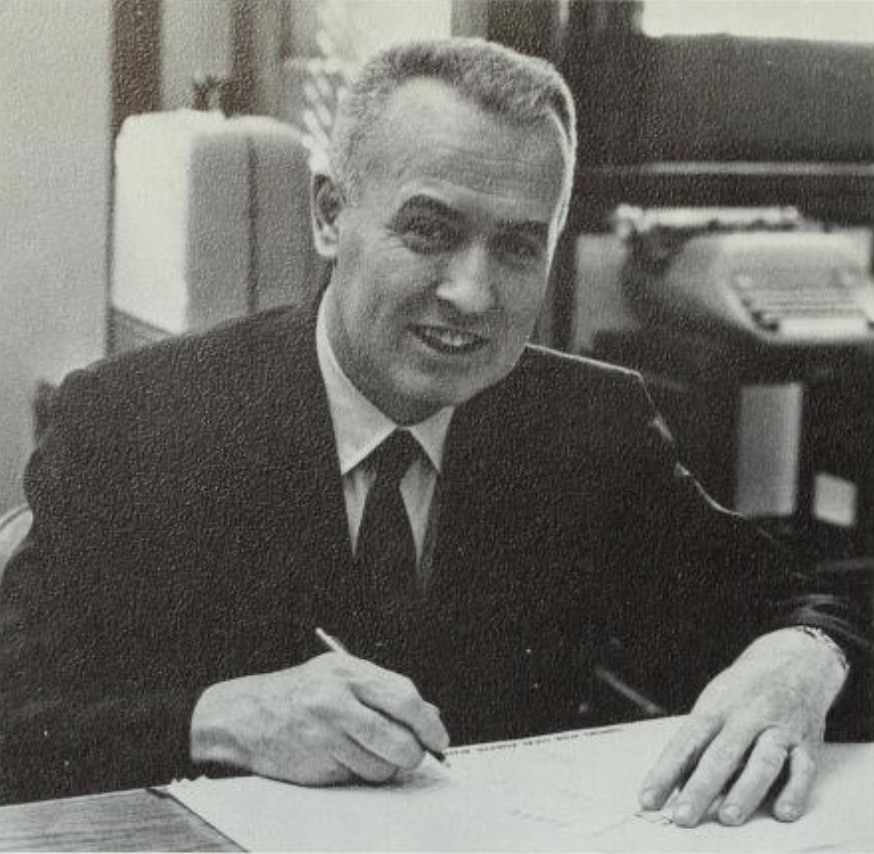
- McManus as head coach of the Creighton Bluejays in 1969

Biographical details
- Born: January 30, 1925
- Died: July 23, 2013 (aged 88); Omaha, Nebraska, U.S.
- Education: St. Ambrose

Coaching career (HC unless noted)
- 1950–1958: St. Ambrose Academy
- 1958–1959: Iowa (assistant)
- 1959–1969: Creighton

Administrative career (AD unless noted)
- 1961–1969: Creighton

John J. "Red" McManus (January 30, 1925 – July 23, 2013) was an American basketball coach best known for his tenure as head coach at Creighton University.

McManus, who attended St. Ambrose Academy (now Assumption High School) and St. Ambrose University in Davenport, Iowa, coached his high school alma mater from 1950 to 1958. After a year as an assistant at Iowa, McManus was named head coach and athletic director at Creighton in Omaha, Nebraska. He led the Bluejays to a 138–118 record from 1959 to 1969 and took the program to the NCAA Tournament appearances in 1962 and 1964.

McManus died on July 23, 2013, under hospice care in Omaha. He was 88.
