= 1961–62 Creighton Bluejays men's basketball team =

American college basketball season

1961–62 Creighton Bluejays men's basketball
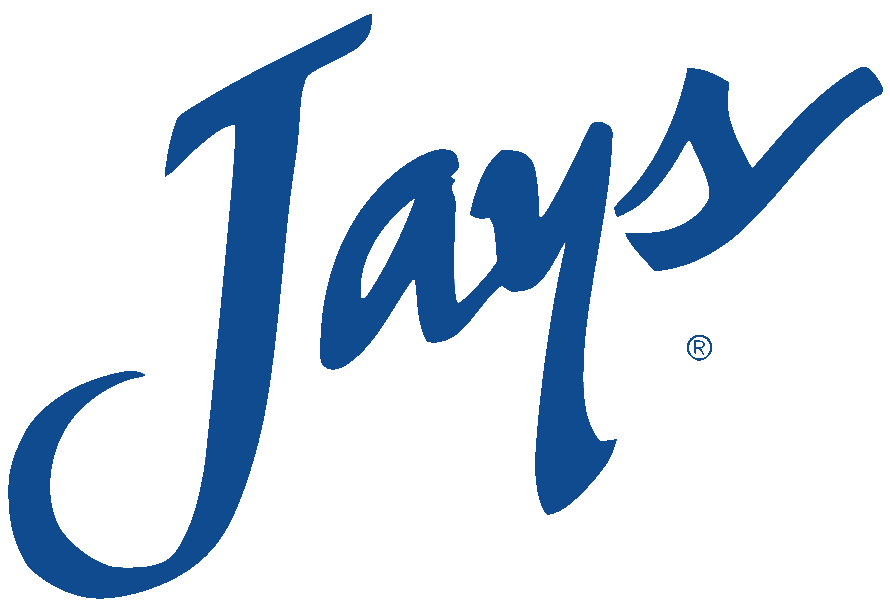

1962 NCAA Tournament, Sweet Sixteen
- Conference: Independent
- Record: 21–5
- Head coach: Red McManus
- Home arena: Omaha Civic Auditorium

The 1961–62 Creighton Bluejays men's basketball team represented Creighton University during the 1961–62 NCAA Division I men's basketball season. The Bluejays, led by third year head coach John J. 'Red' McManus, played their home games at the Omaha Civic Auditorium. They finished the season 21-5. The Creighton Bluejays earned a bid into the 1962 NCAA Tournament where they defeated Memphis State in the Midwest Region Quarterfinals round before falling in the Midwest Region Semifinals to the #2 ranked, and eventual 1962 National Champion, Cincinnati Bearcats. The Bluejays defeated Texas Tech in the Midwest Region Third Place game.

Before the season started, Red appeared before the Quarterback Club in Omaha and with his first words stated that Creighton was going to a post season tournament. A majority of the people felt that McManus had a fatal case of over-optimism. The previous year's 8-17 record was far from good. McManus worked tirelessly to turn Creighton into a basketball power. He utilized sharp recruiting and tough coaching to put the Bluejays back on the road to fame. The hard work paid off. Sophomore Paul Silas would blossom into a force in the middle, leading the nation in rebounding for the 1961–62 and 1962-63 seasons.

== Roster ==
Number	Name	Position	Height	Weight	Year	Hometown
21	Herb Millard				Senior	
22	Santos Jimenez					
23	Pete McManamon					
24	Chuck Officer	Guard	6-2	175	Junior	Moline, Illinois
25	Harry Forehand					
31	John Callaghan					
32	Tom Dowling					
33	Larry Wagner					
35	Paul Silas	Center	6-7	220	Sophomore	Oakland, California
41	Carl Silvestrini					
42	Jim Swassing					
43	Bob Eickholt					
45	Jim Bakos				Sophomore	East Chicago, Indiana
52	Mike Lynch					

== Schedule ==
Date time, TV	Rank^{#}	Opponent^{#}	Result	Record	Site (attendance) city, state
Regular Season
12/01/1961		Colorado College	W 85-51	1–0	Omaha Civic Auditorium (-); Omaha, Nebraska
12/09/1961		Notre Dame	W 73-71	2–0	Omaha Civic Auditorium (-); Omaha, Nebraska
12/12/1961		at Illinois	L 61-70	2-1	Huff Hall (-); Champaign, Illinois
12/14/1961		Denver	W 60-59	3–1	Omaha Civic Auditorium (-); Omaha, Nebraska
12/16/1961		at Northwestern	L 56-59	3-2	McGaw Memorial Hall (-); Evanston, Illinois
12/18/1961		Gonzaga	W 82-77	4–2	Omaha Civic Auditorium (-); Omaha, Nebraska
12/19/1961		at South Dakota	W 85-59	5–2	(-); Vermillion, South Dakota
12/20/1961		UCLA	W 74-72	6–2	Omaha Civic Auditorium (-); Omaha, Nebraska
12/21/1961		Rice	W 91-57	7–2	Omaha Civic Auditorium (-); Omaha, Nebraska
12/29/1961		Princeton	W 63-54	8-2	Omaha Civic Auditorium (-); Omaha, Nebraska
1/02/1962		South Dakota	W 84-58	9-2	Omaha Civic Auditorium (-); Omaha, Nebraska
1/06/1962		Wabash	W 96-62	10-2	Omaha Civic Auditorium (-); Omaha, Nebraska
1/13/1962		at St. John's	L 52-72	10–3	Alumni Hall (-); Jamaica, New York
1/15/1962		at Seton Hall	L 80-86	10–4	Walsh Gymnasium (-); South Orange, New Jersey
1/27/1962		at Nevada	W 76-69	11–4	(-); Reno, Nevada
2/03/1962		at Iowa	W 68-67	12-4	Iowa Fieldhouse (-); Iowa City, Iowa
2/05/1962		at Marquette	W 79-72 ^{OT}	13–4	(-); Milwaukee, Wisconsin
2/10/1962		at Notre Dame	W 74-71	14–4	Notre Dame Fieldhouse (-); South Bend, Indiana
2/12/1962		at St. Ambrose	W 93-63	15-4	(-); Davenport, Iowa
2/16/1962		at Air Force	W 61-60	16-4	(-); Colorado Springs, Colorado
2/19/1962		Centenary	W 77-70	17–4	Omaha Civic Auditorium (-); Omaha, Nebraska
2/26/1962		North Dakota State	W 84-54	18–4	Omaha Civic Auditorium (-); Omaha, Nebraska
3/03/1962		North Dakota	W 90-54	19-4	Omaha Civic Auditorium (-); Omaha, Nebraska
1962 NCAA Tournament
03/12/1962		vs. Memphis State; Midwest Region Quarterfinals	W 87-83	20-4	Moody Coliseum (-); Dallas, Texas
03/16/1962		vs. No. 2 Cincinnati; Midwest Region Semifinals	L 46-66	20-5	Ahearn Field House (-); Manhattan, Kansas
03/17/1962		vs. Texas Tech; Midwest Region Third-place game	W 63-61	21-5	Ahearn Field House (-); Manhattan, Kansas
