= 1962 NCAA University Division basketball tournament =

Edition of USA college basketball tournament

- Season: 1961–62
- Teams: 25
- Finals site: Freedom Hall, Louisville, Kentucky
- Champions: Cincinnati Bearcats (2nd title, 2nd title game, 4th Final Four)
- Runner-up: Ohio State Buckeyes (4th title game, 7th Final Four)
- Semifinalists: UCLA Bruins (1st Final Four); Wake Forest Demon Deacons (1st Final Four)
- Winning coach: Ed Jucker (2nd title)
- MOP: Paul Hogue (Cincinnati)
- Attendance: 177,469
- Top scorer: Len Chappell (Wake Forest) (134 points)

The 1962 NCAA University Division basketball tournament involved 25 schools playing in single-elimination play to determine the national champion of men's NCAA Division I college basketball in the United States. The 24th annual edition of the tournament began on March 12, 1962, and ended with the championship game on March 24, at Freedom Hall in Louisville, Kentucky. A total of 29 games were played, including a third-place game in each region and a national third-place game, which was won by Wake Forest.

For the second consecutive season, Cincinnati, coached by Ed Jucker, played Ohio State, coached by Fred Taylor, in the final game. Cincinnati won the national title with a 71–59 victory over Ohio State. Paul Hogue of Cincinnati was named the tournament's Most Outstanding Player.

The total attendance for the tournament was 177,469, a new record.

== Locations ==
Round	Region	Site	Venue
First Round	East	Philadelphia, Pennsylvania	The Palestra
First Round	Mideast	Lexington, Kentucky	Memorial Coliseum
First Round	Midwest	Dallas, Texas	SMU Coliseum
First Round	West	Corvallis, Oregon	Oregon State Coliseum
Regionals	East	College Park, Maryland	Cole Field House
Regionals	Mideast	Iowa City, Iowa	Iowa Field House
Regionals	Midwest	Manhattan, Kansas	Ahearn Field House
Regionals	West	Provo, Utah	Smith Fieldhouse
Final Four		Louisville, Kentucky	Freedom Hall

== Teams ==
Region	Team	Coach	Conference	Finished	Final Opponent	Score
East
East	Massachusetts	Matt Zunic	Yankee	First round	NYU	L 70–50
East	NYU	Lou Rossini	Metro NY	Regional third place	Saint Joseph's	W 94–85
East	Saint Joseph's	Jack Ramsay	Middle Atlantic	Regional Fourth Place	NYU	L 94–85
East	Villanova	Jack Kraft	Independent	Regional Runner-up	Wake Forest	L 79–69
East	Wake Forest	Bones McKinney	Atlantic Coast	Third Place	UCLA	W 82–80
East	West Virginia	George King	Southern	First round	Villanova	L 90–75
East	Yale	Joe Vancisin	Ivy League	First round	Wake Forest	L 92–82
Mideast
Mideast	Bowling Green	Harold Anderson	Mid-American	First round	Butler	L 56–55
Mideast	Butler	Tony Hinkle	Independent	Regional third place	Western Kentucky	W 87–86
Mideast	Detroit	Bob Calihan	Independent	First round	Western Kentucky	L 90–81
Mideast	Kentucky	Adolph Rupp	Southeastern	Regional Runner-up	Ohio State	L 74–64
Mideast	Ohio State	Fred Taylor	Big Ten	Runner Up	Cincinnati	L 71–59
Mideast	Western Kentucky	Ed Diddle	Ohio Valley	Regional Fourth Place	Butler	L 87–86
Midwest
Midwest	Air Force	Bob Spear	Independent	First round	Texas Tech	L 68–66
Midwest	Cincinnati	Ed Jucker	Missouri Valley	Champion	Ohio State	W 71–59
Midwest	Colorado	Sox Walseth	Big 8	Regional Runner-up	Cincinnati	L 73–46
Midwest	Creighton	Red McManus	Independent	Regional third place	Texas Tech	W 63–61
Midwest	Memphis State	Bob Vanatta	Independent	First round	Creighton	L 87–83
Midwest	Texas Tech	Gene Gibson	Southwest	Regional Fourth Place	Creighton	L 63–61
West
West	Arizona State	Ned Wulk	Border	First round	Utah State	L 78–73
West	Oregon State	Slats Gill	Independent	Regional Runner-up	UCLA	L 88–69
West	Pepperdine	Duck Dowell	West Coast Athletic	Regional third place	Utah State	W 75–71
West	Seattle	Vince Cazzetta	Independent	First round	Oregon State	L 69–65
West	UCLA	John Wooden	AAWU	Fourth Place	Wake Forest	L 82–80
West	Utah State	LaDell Andersen	Mountain States	Regional Fourth Place	Pepperdine	L 75–71

== Bracket ==
* – Denotes overtime period

=== East region ===
Quarterfinals
Wake Forest	92
Yale	82*
NYU	70
Massachusetts	50
Villanova	90
West Virginia	75

Semifinals
Saint Joseph's	85*
Wake Forest	96
NYU	76
Villanova	79

Finals
Wake Forest	79
Villanova	69

=== Mideast region ===
Quarterfinals
Butler	56
Bowling Green	55
Western Kentucky	90
Detroit	81

Semifinals
Kentucky	81
Butler	60
Ohio State	93
Western Kentucky	73

Finals
Kentucky	64
Ohio State	74

=== Midwest region ===
Quarterfinals
Texas Tech	68
Air Force	66
Creighton	87
Memphis State	83

Semifinals
Colorado	67
Texas Tech	60
Cincinnati	66
Creighton	46

Finals
Colorado	46
Cincinnati	73

=== West region ===
Quarterfinals
Oregon State	69
Seattle	65*
Utah State	78
Arizona State	73

Semifinals
Pepperdine	67
Oregon State	69
UCLA	73
Utah State	62

Finals
Oregon State	69
UCLA	88

=== Final Four ===
National Semifinals
E	Wake Forest	68
ME	Ohio State	84
MW	Cincinnati	72
W	UCLA	70

National Championship Game
ME	Ohio State	59
MW	Cincinnati	71

=== National Third-Place Game ===
National Third Place Game
E	Wake Forest	82
W	UCLA	80

=== Regional Third-Place Games ===
East Regional third place
NYU	94
Saint Joseph's	85

Mideast Regional third place
Butler	87
Western Kentucky	86

Midwest Regional third place
Creighton	63
Texas Tech	61

West Regional third place
Pepperdine	75
Utah State	71

== See also ==
- 1962 NCAA College Division basketball tournament
- 1962 National Invitation Tournament
- 1962 NAIA basketball tournament
