= 1961–62 Ohio State Buckeyes men's basketball team =

American college basketball season

1961–62 Ohio State Buckeyes men's basketball
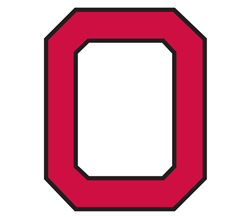

Big Ten Champions NCAA regular season champions NCAA tournament, runner-up

National Championship Game, L 59-71 vs. Cincinnati
- Conference: Big Ten

Ranking
- Coaches: No. 1
- AP: No. 1
- Record: 26–2 (13–1 Big Ten)
- Head coach: Fred Taylor
- Home arena: St. John Arena

1961–62 Big Ten Conference men's basketball standings
	Conf.				Overall
Team	W		L	PCT	W		L	PCT
No. 1 Ohio State	13	–	1	.929	26	–	2	.929
Wisconsin	10	–	4	.714	17	–	7	.708
Purdue	9	–	5	.643	17	–	7	.708
Illinois	7	–	7	.500	15	–	8	.652
Indiana	7	–	7	.500	13	–	11	.542
Iowa	7	–	7	.500	13	–	11	.542
Minnesota	6	–	8	.429	10	–	14	.417
Michigan	5	–	9	.357	7	–	17	.292
Michigan State	3	–	11	.214	8	–	14	.364
Northwestern	3	–	11	.214	8	–	15	.348
Rankings from AP Poll

The 1961–62 Ohio State Buckeyes men's basketball team represented Ohio State University. The team's head coach was Fred Taylor.

== Roster ==
1961–62 Ohio State Buckeyes men's basketball team
Players
Coaches

Pos.	#	Name	Height	Weight	Year	Previous school	Hometown
G	3	Mel Nowell	6 ft 2 in (1.88 m)	170 lb (77 kg)	Sr	East	Columbus, Ohio
G	5	John Havlicek	6 ft 5 in (1.96 m)	200 lb (91 kg)	Sr	Bridgeport	Bridgeport, Ohio
F/C	11	Jerry Lucas	6 ft 8 in (2.03 m)	225 lb (102 kg)	Sr	Middletown	Middletown, Ohio
F	24	Bob Knight	6 ft 5 in (1.96 m)	—	Sr	Orrville	Orrville, Ohio

Head coach

- Fred Taylor

Assistant coach(es)

Legend

- (C) Team captain
- (S) Suspended
- (I) Ineligible
- (W) Walk-on
- Injured
- Current redshirt

== Schedule ==
Date time, TV	Rank^{#}	Opponent^{#}	Result	Record	Site city, state
Non-conference regular season
December 2*	No. 1	Florida State	W 72–57	1–0	St. John Arena; Columbus, OH
December 6*	No. 1	at Pittsburgh	W 99–79	2–0	Pittsburgh, PA
December 8*	No. 1	Wichita State	W 85–62	3–0	St. John Arena; Columbus, OH
December 9*	No. 1	at No. 3 Wake Forest	W 84–62	4–0	Winston-Salem, NC
December 16*	No. 1	Loyola (IL)	W 92–72	5–0	St. John Arena; Columbus, OH
December 18*	No. 1	at Saint Louis	W 61–48	6–0	
December 23*	No. 1	Penn State	W 92–49	7–0	St. John Arena; Columbus, OH
December 27*	No. 1	vs. Washington; LA Holiday Classic	W 59–49	8–0	Los Angeles
December 28*	No. 1	vs. UCLA; LA Holiday Classic	W 105–84	9–0	Los Angeles
December 30*	No. 1	vs. USC; LA Holiday Classic	W 76–66	10–0	Los Angeles
Big Ten Regular season
January 6	No. 1	at Northwestern	W 85–62	11–0 (1–0)	Evanston, IL
January 13	No. 1	Michigan	W 89–64	12–0 (2–0)	St. John Arena; Columbus, OH
January 20	No. 1	at Minnesota	W 90–76	13–0 (3–0)	Minneapolis, MN
January 22	No. 1	Purdue	W 91–65	14–0 (4–0)	St. John Arena; Columbus, OH
January 29	No. 1	at Purdue	W 94–73	15–0 (5–0)	West Lafayette, IN
February 3	No. 1	Northwestern	W 97–61	16–0 (6–0)	St. John Arena; Columbus, OH
February 5	No. 1	Iowa	W 89–63	17–0 (7–0)	St. John Arena; Columbus, OH
February 10	No. 1	Minnesota	W 91–66	18–0 (8–0)	St. John Arena; Columbus, OH
February 12	No. 1	at Michigan	W 72–57	19–0 (9–0)	Ann Arbor, MI
February 17	No. 1	at Michigan State	W 80–72	20–0 (10–0)	East Lansing, MI
February 24	No. 1	Illinois	W 102–79	21–0 (11–0)	St. John Arena; Columbus, OH
February 26	No. 1	at Iowa	W 72–62	22–0 (12–0)	Iowa Field House; Iowa City, IA
March 3	No. 1	at Wisconsin	L 67–81	22–1 (12–1)	Madison, WI
March 10	No. 1	Indiana	W 90–65	23–1 (13–1)	St. John Arena; Columbus, OH
NCAA Tournament
March 16*	No. 1	vs. Western Kentucky; NCAA tournament Mideast Regional semifinal	W 93–73	24–1	Iowa Field House; Iowa City, IA
March 17*	No. 1	vs. No. 3 Kentucky; NCAA Tournament Mideast Regional final	W 74–64	25–1	Iowa Field House; Iowa City, IA
March 23*	No. 1	vs. Wake Forest; NCAA Tournament National semifinal	W 84–68	26–1	Freedom Hall; Louisville, KY
March 24*	No. 1	vs. No. 2 Cincinnati; NCAA tournament championship game	L 59–71	26–2	Freedom Hall; Louisville, KY
*Non-conference game. ^{#}Rankings from AP Poll. (#) Tournament seedings in parentheses. ME=Mideast.

== Rankings ==
Ranking movements Legend: ██ Increase in ranking ██ Decrease in ranking — = Not ranked
	Week														
Poll	Pre	1	2	3	4	5	6	7	8	9	10	11	12	13	Final
AP	1	—	1	1	1	1	1	1	1	1	1	1	1	1	1
Coaches	Not released	1	1	1	1	1	1	1	1	1	1	1	1	1	1

== Awards and honors ==
- John Havlicek, First Team All-Big Ten
- Jerry Lucas, All-America selection
- Jerry Lucas, Chicago Tribune Silver Basketball
- Jerry Lucas, First Team All-Big Ten
- Jerry Lucas, USBWA College Player of the Year

== Team players drafted into the NBA ==
Round	Pick	Player	NBA club
1	6	Jerry Lucas	Cincinnati Royals
1	9	John Havlicek	Boston Celtics
12	90	Mel Nowell	Chicago Zephyrs
