= Paul Hogue =

American basketball player (1940–2009)

Personal information
- Born: April 28, 1940 Knoxville, Tennessee, U.S.
- Died: August 17, 2009 (aged 69) Cincinnati, Ohio, U.S.
- Listed height: 6 ft 9 in (2.06 m)
- Listed weight: 240 lb (109 kg)

Career information
- High school: Austin (Knoxville, Tennessee)
- College: Cincinnati (1959–1962)
- NBA draft: 1962: 1st round, 2nd overall pick
- Drafted by: New York Knicks
- Playing career: 1962–1964
- Position: Center
- Number: 14

Career history
- 1962–1963: New York Knicks
- 1963–1964: Baltimore Bullets
- 1964: Wilmington Blue Bombers

Career highlights
- 2× NCAA champion (1961, 1962); NCAA Final Four MOP (1962); Helms College Player of the Year (1962); First-team All-American – USBWA (1962); Second-team All-American – NABC, NEA (1962); Third-team All-American – AP, UPI (1962); 2× First-team All-MVC (1961, 1962)

Career NBA statistics
- Points: 409 (6.3 ppg)
- Rebounds: 461 (7.1 rpg)
- Assists: 48 (0.7 apg)
- Stats at NBA.com
- Stats at Basketball Reference

Paul H. "Duke" Hogue (April 28, 1940 – August 17, 2009) was an American basketball player in the National Basketball Association (NBA).

== Early life ==
Hogue grew up on Wilson Avenue in Knoxville, Tennessee, and played basketball at Austin High School, an all-black high school where his father served as principal. He graduated from Austin in 1958.

== College career ==
Because Hogue was Black, he wasn't recruited by nearby or southern universities. He chose to attend the University of Cincinnati, largely due to the program's prominence and the chance to play with its star, Oscar Robertson.

A 6 ft 9 in center, Hogue made his varsity debut with the Bearcats in 1959–60. As a sophomore, he averaged 12.2 points, shooting .576 from the field, and 11.3 rebounds per game. Hogue was named All-Missouri Valley Conference (MVC) as the Bearcats won the league title, posted a 28–2 record and, led by Robertson, advanced to the Final Four, where the Bearcats finished in third place.

As a junior in 1960–61, Hogue led UC in rebounding with 12.5 per game and he also led the team with a .532 field goal percentage while averaging 16.8 points per game. He again was named All-MVC as the 27–3 Bearcats again captured the league crown. He was named second-team All-American by Converse. The Bearcats advanced to the championship game of the 1961 NCAA tournament, capturing the national title with a 70–65 overtime win over Ohio State.

As a senior in 1961–62, Hogue was the team captain. He was again All-MVC and led the Bearcats in both scoring and rebounding with 16.8 points and 12.4 rebounds per game as the Bearcats again were MVC champions. He was named first-team All-American by the Basketball Writers and the Helms Foundation, second-team All-American by the NEA and Coaches Association, and third-team All-American by the Associated Press (AP) and United Press International (UPI). He was named the 1962 Helms Foundation Player of the Year. The Bearcats again advanced to the NCAA championship game, where they again defeated Ohio State, 71–59, to earn their second consecutive national championship.

In his three-year career at Cincinnati, Hogue scored 1,391 points, which was third at the time behind Robertson and Jack Twyman.

== NBA career ==
Hogue was a first round pick (second overall) in the 1962 NBA draft by the New York Knicks. In his rookie season of 1962–63, Hogue played center, appearing an average of 26.8 minutes per game in 50 games with 7.7 points and 8.6 rebounds per game.

In 1963–64, he played six games for the Knicks before being traded to the Baltimore Bullets on October 29, 1963, along with Gene Shue for Bill McGill. He played just nine games for the Bullets. Averaging 1.7 points and 2.1 rebounds per game for the season, his second season was his last as a professional.

== Personal life ==
After his basketball career ended, Hogue worked for many years for the U.S. Postal Service in Cincinnati, including as the supervisor of the Employee Assistance Program. He served as a school board member for Princeton City Schools in suburban Cincinnati from 1988 to 2000 and he was a Village of Woodlawn council member from 2006 to 2009.

Hogue was married to his wife, Patti, for 43 years and they had three sons and one daughter. Hogue died at age 69 on August 17, 2009, of heart and kidney failure. He is buried at Spring Grove Cemetery in Cincinnati.

On September 10, 2011, the City of Knoxville, Tennessee renamed Union Square Park, near Hogue's boyhood home, Paul Hogue Park in his honor. The naming ceremony was held prior to the University of Cincinnati's football game against the University of Tennessee. The event was attended by Knoxville Mayor Daniel Brown, Hogue's wife Patti and other family members, and some of Hogue's former UC teammates including Tom Thacker, George Wilson and John Harshaw.

== Career statistics ==
Legend
| GP | Games played | GS | Games started | MPG | Minutes per game |
| FG% | Field goal percentage | 3P% | 3-point field goal percentage | FT% | Free throw percentage |
| RPG | Rebounds per game | APG | Assists per game | SPG | Steals per game |
| BPG | Blocks per game | PPG | Points per game | **Bold** | Career high |

=== NBA ===
==== Regular season ====
| Year | Team | GP | MPG | FG% | FT% | RPG | APG | PPG |
|---|---|---|---|---|---|---|---|---|
| 1962–63 | New York | **50** | **26.8** | .363 | .454 | **8.6** | **.8** | **7.7** |
| 1963–64 | New York | 6 | 14.8 | **.563** | .200 | 2.5 | **.8** | 3.2 |
| 1963–64 | Baltimore | 9 | 6.4 | .214 | **.500** | 1.8 | .1 | .8 |
| Career | | 65 | 22.9 | .365 | .448 | 7.1 | .7 | 6.3 |
