= 1961–62 Loyola Ramblers men's basketball team =

American college basketball season

1961–62 Loyola Ramblers men's basketball
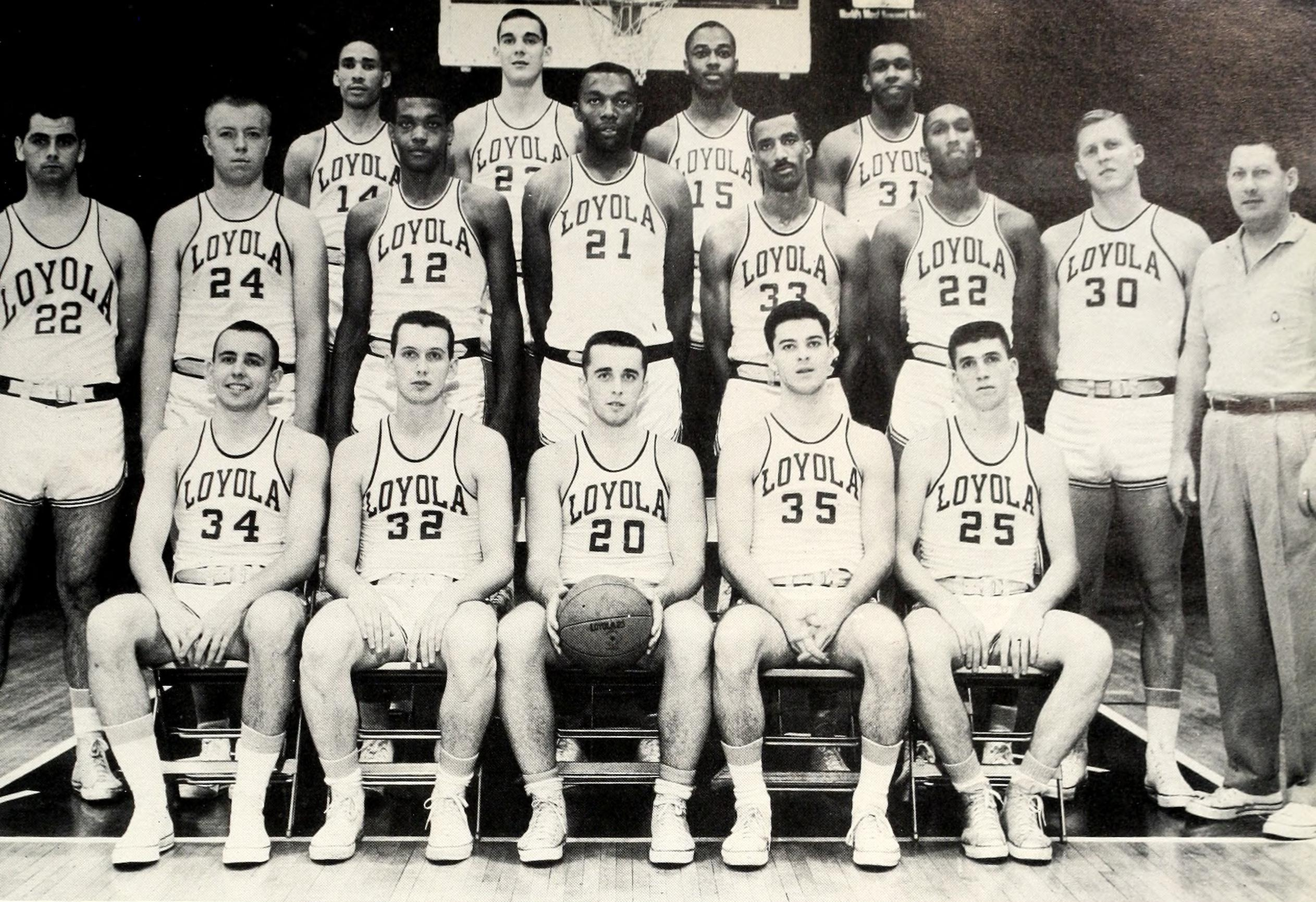

National Invitation Tournament, Third place
- Conference: Independent

Ranking
- Coaches: No. 13
- Record: 23–4
- Head coach: George Ireland (11th season)

The 1961–62 Loyola Ramblers men's basketball team represented Loyola University Chicago. The head coach was George Ireland. The Ramblers went 23–4 and earned a third place finish in the National Invitation Tournament (NIT).

Jerry Harkness led the team in scoring with a total of 567 points, making for an average of 21.0 points per game. Les Hunter led in field goal percentage at 49.3%, going 137 for 238 on the season. Vic Rouse led the team in rebounding, making 294 rebounds for a per-game average of 11.3, and in free throw percentage, sinking 85 out of 109 throws for 78.0% on the season. The team averaged 90.2 points per game, the fourth-highest scoring average in Loyola-Chicago history as of 2018.

== Roster ==
Name	#	Pos	Height	Year	Hometown
Floyd Bosley	33	C	6–8		
John Crnokrak	30	F	6–4	Senior	
John Egan	20	G	5–10	Sophomore	Chicago, IL
Mike Gavin	35	G	6–0	Senior	Chicago, IL
Jerry Harkness	15	F	6–3	Junior	Bronx, NY
Les Hunter	12	C	6–7	Sophomore	Nashville, TN
Dan McQuade	32				
Ron Miller	31	G	6–2	Sophomore	Bronx, NY
Nick Pallotta	22	F	6–4	Sophomore	Canton, OH
Alan Ray	14	F	6–0		
Jim Reardon	24	F	6–4	Junior	Chicago, IL
Rich Rochelle	21	C	6–9	Sophomore	
Vic Rouse	22	F	6–6	Sophomore	Nashville, TN
Jim Schilling	25				
Jerry Verway	34	G	6–0	Senior	Racine, WI
Chuck Wood	23	G/F	6–3	Sophomore	Racine, WI

Sources: Sports-Reference, Loyola yearbook

== Schedule ==
Date time, TV	Opponent	Result	Record	Site city, state
December 2, 1961*	Assumption	W 95–44	1–0	Alumni Gym; Chicago, IL
December 5, 1961*	South Dakota	W 104–63	2–0	Alumni Gym; Chicago, IL
December 9, 1961*	Wayne State	W 93–43	3–0	Alumni Gym; Chicago, IL
December 11, 1961*	North Dakota	W 96–73	4–0	Alumni Gym; Chicago, IL
December 13, 1961*	at Western Michigan	W 87–85	5–0	University Arena; Kalamazoo, MI
December 16, 1961*	at Ohio State	L 72–92	5–1	St. John Arena; Columbus, OH
December 18, 1961*	Ohio	W 77–69	6–1	Alumni Gym; Chicago, IL
December 28, 1961*	Colgate	W 93–54	7–1	Chicago Stadium; Chicago, IL
December 30, 1961*	Indiana	W 95–90	8–1	Chicago Stadium; Chicago, IL
January 6, 1962*	at Detroit Mercy	W 90–76	9–1	Calihan Hall; Detroit, MI
January 9, 1962*	at Marquette	L 60–63	9–2	Milwaukee Arena; Milwaukee, WI
January 20, 1962*	Memphis State	W 100–76	10–2	Alumni Gym; Chicago, IL
January 23, 1962*	at Loyola (La.)	W 95–73	11–2	Loyola Field House; New Orleans, LA
January 27, 1962*	St. John's (N.Y.)	W 92–82	12–2	Chicago Stadium; Chicago, IL
January 30, 1962*	at Ohio	W 93–75	13–2	Grover Center; Athens, OH
February 1, 1962*	Baldwin Wallace	W 108–68	14–2	Alumni Gym; Chicago, IL
February 7, 1962*	Western Michigan	W 102–79	15–2	Alumni Gym; Chicago, IL
February 15, 1962*	at Marshall	W 88–80	16–2	
February 19, 1962*	St. Norbert	W 105–52	17–2	Alumni Gym; Chicago, IL
February 24, 1962*	Marquette	W 98–84	18–2	Chicago Stadium; Chicago, IL
February 26, 1962*	at Washington (Mo.)	W 103–80	19–2	
March 1, 1962*	Bowling Green	W 81–68	20–2	Alumni Gym; Chicago, IL
March 3, 1962*	at John Carroll	W 67–66	21–2	
March 5, 1962*	at Xavier	L 89–96	21–3	Schmidt Fieldhouse; Cincinnati, OH
National Invitation Tournament
March 17, 1962*	vs. Temple; NIT Quarterfinal	W 75–64	22–3	Madison Square Garden; New York, NY
March 22, 1962*	vs. Dayton; NIT Semifinal	L 82–98	22–4	Madison Square Garden; New York, NY
March 24, 1962*	vs. Duquesne; NIT third-place game	W 95–84	23–4	Madison Square Garden; New York, NY
*Non-conference game. ^{#}Rankings from AP Poll. (#) Tournament seedings in parentheses. All times are in Central Standard Time. Sources
