= List of 1965–66 NBA season transactions =

These are the list of personnel changes in the NBA from the 1965–66 NBA season.

== Events ==
=== September 15, 1965 ===
- The Boston Celtics sold Joe Strawder to the Detroit Pistons.

=== September 22, 1965 ===
- The Baltimore Bullets traded Wali Jones to the Philadelphia 76ers for Red Kerr.

=== October 10, 1965 ===
- The Baltimore Bullets traded Si Green to the Boston Celtics for a 1966 5th round draft pick (John Jones was later selected).

=== October 14, 1965 ===
- The Los Angeles Lakers traded Dick Barnett to the New York Knicks for Bob Boozer.
- The San Francisco Warriors claimed Art Heyman on waivers from the New York Knicks.

=== October 20, 1965 ===
- The Cincinnati Royals traded Bud Olsen and cash to the San Francisco Warriors for Connie Dierking and Art Heyman.

=== October 24, 1965 ===
- The Philadelphia 76ers signed Gerry Ward as a free agent.

=== October 27, 1965 ===
- The Philadelphia 76ers sold Ben Warley to the Baltimore Bullets.

=== October 28, 1965 ===
- The Boston Celtics signed Don Nelson as a free agent.

=== November 2, 1965 ===
- The Baltimore Bullets traded Walt Bellamy to the New York Knicks for Jim Barnes, Johnny Egan, Johnny Green and cash.

=== November 25, 1965 ===
- The Detroit Pistons signed Bob Warlick as a free agent.

=== November 29, 1965 ===
- The New York Knicks fired Harry Gallatin as head coach.
- The New York Knicks hired Dick McGuire as head coach.

=== December 2, 1965 ===
- The Philadelphia 76ers claimed Art Heyman on waivers from the Cincinnati Royals.

=== December 8, 1965 ===
- The Cincinnati Royals sold Bill Chielewski to the Detroit Pistons.

=== December 13, 1965 ===
- The Boston Celtics signed Woody Sauldsberry as a free agent.

=== December 24, 1965 ===
- The St. Louis Hawks traded John Tresvant and Chico Vaughn to the Detroit Pistons for Rod Thorn.

=== December 28, 1965 ===
- The Detroit Pistons traded Joe Caldwell to the St. Louis Hawks for John Barnhill.

=== February 1, 1966 ===
- The Los Angeles Lakers signed Tom Hoover as a free agent.

=== March 22, 1966 ===
- The San Francisco Warriors fired Alex Hannum as head coach.
- The San Francisco Warriors hired Bill Sharman as head coach.

=== April 18, 1966 ===
- The Boston Celtics hired Bill Russell as head coach.

=== April 28, 1966 ===
- The Baltimore Bullets hired Mike Farmer as head coach.

=== May 1, 1966 ===
- The Chicago Bulls drafted John Barnhill from the Detroit Pistons in the NBA expansion draft.
- The Chicago Bulls drafted Al Bianchi from the Philadelphia 76ers in the NBA expansion draft.
- The Chicago Bulls drafted Ron Bonham from the Boston Celtics in the NBA expansion draft.
- The Chicago Bulls drafted Nate Bowman from the Cincinnati Royals in the NBA expansion draft.
- The Chicago Bulls drafted Bob Boozer from the Los Angeles Lakers in the NBA expansion draft.
- The Chicago Bulls drafted Len Chappell from the New York Knicks in the NBA expansion draft.
- The Chicago Bulls drafted Barry Clemens from the New York Knicks in the NBA expansion draft.
- The Chicago Bulls drafted Red Kerr from the Baltimore Bullets in the NBA expansion draft.
- The Chicago Bulls drafted Jerry Sloan from the Baltimore Bullets in the NBA expansion draft.
- The Chicago Bulls drafted Tom Thacker from the Cincinnati Royals in the NBA expansion draft.
- The Chicago Bulls drafted John Thompson from the Boston Celtics in the NBA expansion draft.
- The Chicago Bulls drafted Gerry Ward from the Philadelphia 76ers in the NBA expansion draft.
- The Chicago Bulls drafted Keith Erickson from the San Francisco Warriors in the NBA expansion draft.
- The Chicago Bulls drafted Jim King from the Los Angeles Lakers in the NBA expansion draft.
- The Chicago Bulls drafted Don Kojis from the Detroit Pistons in the NBA expansion draft.
- The Chicago Bulls drafted McCoy McLemore from the San Francisco Warriors in the NBA expansion draft.
- The Chicago Bulls drafted Jeff Mullins from the St. Louis Hawks in the NBA expansion draft.
- The Chicago Bulls drafted Jim Washington from the St. Louis Hawks in the NBA expansion draft.

=== May 2, 1966 ===
- The Philadelphia 76ers fired Dolph Schayes as head coach.
- The Philadelphia 76ers hired Alex Hannum as head coach.

=== May 3, 1966 ===
- The Chicago Bulls hired Red Kerr as head coach.

=== May 11, 1966 ===
- The Chicago Bulls sold Hank Finkel to the Los Angeles Lakers.

=== May 28, 1966 ===
- Paul Seymour resigns as head coach for Baltimore Bullets.

=== June 7, 1966 ===
- The San Francisco Warriors signed Bill McGill as a free agent.
