= Lloyd Batts =

American basketball player (born 1951)

Personal information
- Born: May 9, 1951 (age 75) Chicago, Illinois
- Listed height: 6 ft 4 in (1.93 m)
- Listed weight: 185 lb (84 kg)

Career information
- High school: Thornton Township (Harvey, Illinois)
- College: Cincinnati (1971–1974)
- NBA draft: 1974: 4th round, 60th overall pick
- Drafted by: Kansas City–Omaha Kings
- Playing career: 1974–1983
- Position: Forward / guard
- Number: 33

Career history
- 1974–1975: Virginia Squires
- 1977–1978: West Virginia Wheels
- 1981–1982: Juvecaserta Basket
- 1982–1983: ASVEL Lyon-Villeurbanne
- Stats at Basketball Reference

Lloyd Batts (born May 9, 1951) is a retired American basketball player.

== Early life ==
Born in Chicago, Batts was one of seven children. His father died when Lloyd was 12. His mother was deaf mute, and the state of Illinois decided the brothers and sisters should live with relatives who could better care for them, so Lloyd and two siblings moved to live with an aunt and uncle in a south suburb of Chicago, Illinois.

Batts became a star forward for Thornton Township High School in Harvey, Illinois. As a young player in Chicago, he was known as a "hang-gliding, super-flying sort of player" who was a "legend of local playgrounds." He averaged 29 points per game as a junior and 35 as a senior. He was a two-time all-state selection and named the Chicago Sun-Times Player of the Year as a senior. He graduated in 1970 as the Wildcats' all-time leading scorer with more than 1,600 points.

In 2012, Batts was inducted into the Illinois High School Basketball Hall of Fame. He has a younger brother, Boyd Batts, who was also a high school basketball star who later played professionally for 15 years in Europe and South America.

== College career ==
Batts was heavily recruited out of high school and considered attending the University of Cincinnati, Purdue University and Long Beach State. He chose Cincinnati, in large part because former Thornton Township star Jim Ard had just finished a great career there and because it was the alma mater of all-time basketball great Oscar Robertson.

As a sophomore in 1971–72, Batts led the Bearcats in scoring with 18.7 points per game as the team, coached by Tay Baker, posted a 17–9 record. As a junior under new coach Gale Catlett, the Bearcats were again 17–9 and Batts again led the team in scoring with 20.1 points per game and was named third-team All-American by Basketball Weekly. As a senior in 1973–74, team captain Batts led the Bearcats in scoring for the third season with 21.3 points per game while also leading in assists per game and free throw percentage for the 19–8 team which lost in the first round of the National Invitation Tournament (NIT). He was named honorable mention All-American by the Associated Press (AP) and The Sporting News. In Batts' final home game, he put on a show with 33 points and 10 rebounds as UC defeated Marquette University, which would later advance to the NCAA title game.

By the end of his career, Batts' 1,585 career points made him the school's fourth all-time scorer behind Hall-of-Famers Oscar Robertson and Jack Twyman and also Ron Bonham. He currently stands 11th.

== Professional career ==
He was selected in the fourth round (60th overall) of the 1974 NBA draft by the Kansas City–Omaha Kings and also in the fourth round of the 1974 American Basketball Association (ABA) draft by the Kentucky Colonels.

His ABA rights were traded to the Virginia Squires, for whom he played one season in 1974–75. In 58 games, he played an average of 22.7 minutes per game and averaged 10.3 points, 3.4 rebounds, 1.8 assists and 1.3 steals per game. He then played one season (1977–78) for the West Virginia Wheels of the All-American Basketball Alliance (AABA). In 1978, he signed a non-guaranteed two-year contract with the NBA's Chicago Bulls, but he was cut from the team prior to summer league play.

He then played professionally in Europe for nine years—seven in Belgium, one in Italy and one in France.

== Coach and administrator ==
Batts has two master's degrees—one in physical education and one in administration and education.

He has a long career as a basketball coach and school administrator, including as an assistant coach at Eastern Illinois University and both assistant coach and director of enrollment at South Suburban College.

He has served as head basketball coach at Chicago-area high schools Gage Park High School, Bowen High School, Waukegan High School (two seasons), South Shore High School from 2003 to 2010, where he was also dean of students, and currently at Julian High School. He is also currently the Boys Dean of Students at Chicago Vocational Career Academy.

== Personal life ==
Batts has two children, Davina and Lloyd Jr.
