= Tom Thacker (basketball) =

American basketball player and coach

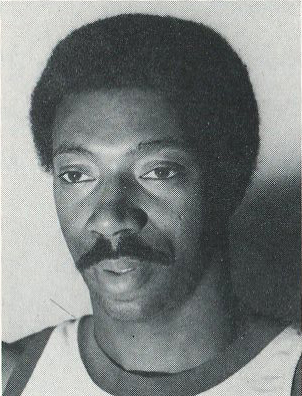

Personal information
- Born: November 2, 1939 (age 87) Covington, Kentucky, U.S.
- Listed height: 6 ft 2 in (1.88 m)
- Listed weight: 170 lb (77 kg)

Career information
- High school: William Grant (Covington, Kentucky)
- College: Cincinnati (1960–1963)
- NBA draft: 1963: territorial pick
- Drafted by: Cincinnati Royals
- Playing career: 1963–1971
- Position: Point guard / shooting guard
- Number: 25, 12, 11, 44
- Coaching career: 1974–1978, 1984–1985

Career history

Playing
- 1963–1966: Cincinnati Royals
- 1967–1968: Boston Celtics
- 1968–1971: Indiana Pacers

Coaching
- 1974–1978: Cincinnati (women's)
- 1984–1985: Cincinnati Slammers

Career highlights
- As player: NBA champion (1968); ABA champion (1970); 2× NCAA champion (1961, 1962); Consensus first-team All-American (1963); 2× First-team All-MVC (1962, 1963)
- Stats at NBA.com
- Stats at Basketball Reference

Thomas Porter Thacker (born November 2, 1939) is an American former basketball player. He played in the National Basketball Association (NBA) for the Cincinnati Royals and the Boston Celtics from 1963 to 1968, and from 1968 to 1971, for the American Basketball Association's Indiana Pacers. He is the only player to have played on an NCAA championship team, an ABA championship team, and an NBA championship team.

== Early life ==
Thacker was born in and grew up in Covington, Kentucky across the Ohio River from Cincinnati, the son of William and Velma Arvin Thacker. He attended Our Savior's High School until integration closed it in 1956. He then attended the all-black William Grant High School, where he played basketball. He averaged 31.7 points per game as a junior and led the team to a 26–5 record. As a senior, he averaged 33.8 points as the team went 31–7. He scored 36 points in his final high school game as the team lost the Kentucky state championship game, 85–84.

In 1959 he needed a few credits to earn his degree, so he attended Holmes High School during the summer and graduated.

== College career ==
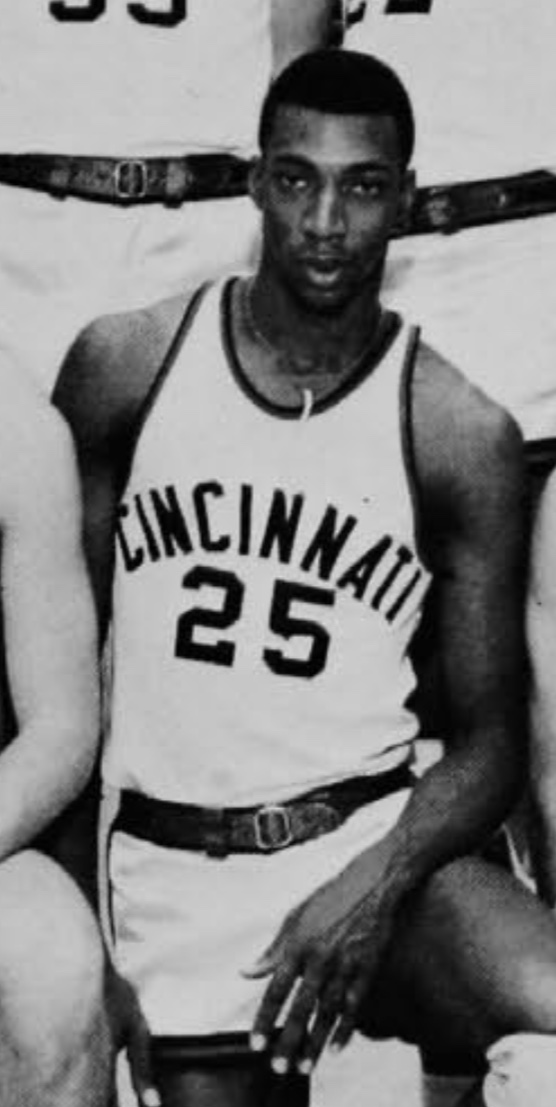
Thacker as a junior at Cincinnati

Thacker attended the University of Cincinnati and played three varsity seasons for the Bearcats under coach Ed Jucker. As a sophomore in 1960–61, he averaged 12.3 points per game and was named All-Missouri Valley Conference (MVC) as the Bearcats won the league title. The Bearcats finished the season with a record of 27–3 and, on March 25, 1961, Cincinnati, led by the balanced attack of Thacker, Bob Wiesenhahn, Tony Yates, Paul Hogue and Carl Bouldin, won the NCAA Championship with a 70–65 overtime win over the Ohio State Buckeyes.

As a junior in 1961–62, Thacker averaged 11.0 points per game and was again All-MVC. The Bearcats again captured the MVC and posted a 29–2 record. With Ron Bonham and George Wilson replacing the departed Wiesenhahn and Bouldin, the Bearcats again captured the NCAA title on March 24, 1962, again over Ohio State, 71–59.

As a senior in 1962–63, he averaged 15.8 points per game, led the team in assists with 4.0 per game, and was named the team MVP. He was also named All-MVC for the third consecutive season. In addition, he was a consensus first-team All-American along with teammate Bonham. The Bearcats, with the same starting lineup as the year before except for Larry Shingleton replacing the departed Hogue, won the league crown yet again and, for the third straight season, advanced to the NCAA championship game. However, on March 23, 1963, the Bearcats lost to Loyola University Chicago.

== Professional career ==
Thacker was chosen in the first round (fifth overall) of the 1963 NBA draft as a territorial pick by the Cincinnati Royals. During his three seasons with the Royals, he played about nine minutes per game as a backup guard, averaging 2.8, 2.5, and 3.7 points per game, respectively during the 1963–64 through 1965–66 seasons. On May 1, 1966, he was drafted by the Chicago Bulls in the NBA expansion draft, but he decided to retire and did not play that season.

On August 4, 1967, he returned to the NBA and was signed as a free agent by the Boston Celtics. It turned out to be a fortuitous trade for Thacker. Averaging about 12 minutes per game and 4.2 points and 2.5 rebounds per game, he earned a championship ring as the Celtics won the NBA title in a six-game finals series over the Los Angeles Lakers. He also posted a career single-game high of 17 points twice, on February 11, 1968, against the Lakers and again on March 7 against the Bulls.

After Thacker's fourth NBA season, on May 6, 1968, he was drafted by the Milwaukee Bucks in the NBA expansion draft. However, he opted to play in the American Basketball Association (ABA) for the Indiana Pacers. In 1968–69, playing just 18 games, he averaged 5.4 points, 3.7 rebounds and 2.9 assists per game, all career personal bests. In 1969–70, he played 70 games, averaging 2.7 points per game and helped the Pacers capture the ABA championship in six games over the Los Angeles Stars. In his third and final ABA season of 1970–71, he played eight games and his seven-year professional career ended.

== Coaching career ==
He became the first African-American coach at the University of Cincinnati, leading the women's basketball program from 1974 to 1978. Thacker was the second coach for the Cincinnati Bearcats women's basketball team and would go on to have an 55–43 record over four seasons, leading three winning campaigns during his coaching time.

Thacker was the head coach for the Cincinnati Slammers of the Continental Basketball Association (CBA) during the 1984–85 season.

== Personal life ==
Thacker earned both a bachelor's degree and a master's degree from the University of Cincinnati. He is also a member of the Beta Eta chapter of Kappa Alpha Psi fraternity.

Thacker owns his own small business, Tom Thacker Enterprises, in Cincinnati.

He has served as deputy director of the Cincinnati Urban League, and he also served as a teacher with Cincinnati Public Schools. In 1986, he was inducted into the Northern Kentucky Sports Hall of Fame and, in 1989, into the Northern Kentucky Black Hall of Fame.

He was inducted into the Ohio Basketball Hall of Fame at the 11th Annual Ceremony on May 21, 2016, in Columbus.

== Career statistics ==
Legend
GP	Games played	GS	Games started	MPG	Minutes per game
FG%	Field goal percentage	3P%	3-point field goal percentage	FT%	Free throw percentage
RPG	Rebounds per game	APG	Assists per game	SPG	Steals per game
BPG	Blocks per game	PPG	Points per game	**Bold**	Career high
†	Won an NBA championship

†	Denotes seasons in which Barnhill's team won an ABA championship

=== NBA/ABA ===
==== Regular season ====
Year	Team	GP	MPG	FG%	3P%	FT%	RPG	APG	PPG
1963–64	Cincinnati	48	9.5	.293		.491	2.4	1.1	2.8
1964–65	Cincinnati	55	8.5	.333		.489	2.3	.7	2.5
1965–66	Cincinnati	50	9.6	.406		.395	2.4	1.2	3.7
1967–68†	Boston	65	12.0	**.419**		.512	2.5	1.1	4.2
1968–69	Indiana (ABA)	18	**19.2**	.342	.000	.581	**3.7**	**2.9**	**5.4**
1969–70†	Indiana (ABA)	**70**	14.5	.330	**.256**	.551	3.0	2.6	2.7
1970–71	Indiana (ABA)	8	11.5	.353	.000	**1.000**	2.8	.9	1.6
Career (NBA)		218	10.0	.371		.482	2.4	1.0	3.3
Career (ABA)		96	15.1	.335	.227	.564	3.1	2.5	3.1
Career (overall)		314	11.6	.360	.227	.508	2.6	1.5	3.2

==== Playoffs ====
Year	Team	GP	MPG	FG%	3P%	FT%	RPG	APG	PPG
1964	Cincinnati	6	7.2	.261		.250	2.2	.5	2.2
1965	Cincinnati	4	11.8	**.385**		**.750**	3.0	.8	3.3
1966	Cincinnati	4	11.5	.318		**.750**	2.3	1.3	4.3
1968†	Boston	**17**	4.8	.292		.286	1.0	.5	.9
1969	Indiana (ABA)	16	**24.4**	.308	.000	.596	**4.8**	**4.3**	**6.3**
1970†	Indiana (ABA)	14	13.4	.316	**.273**	.545	3.4	2.6	2.4
Career (NBA)		31	7.0	.305		.474	1.6	.6	1.9
Career (ABA)		30	19.3	.310	.188	.586	4.2	3.5	4.4
Career (overall)		61	13.0	.308	.188	.558	2.9	2.0	3.1
