= Cincinnati Bearcats men's basketball =

Men's basketball team of the University of Cincinnati

2026–27 Cincinnati Bearcats men's basketball team
- University: University of Cincinnati
- First season: 1901–02; 125 years ago
- Athletic director: John Cunningham
- Head coach: Jerrod Calhoun; 1st season, 5–1 (.833)
- Location: Cincinnati, Ohio
- Arena: Fifth Third Arena (capacity: 12,012)
- NCAA division: Division I
- Conference: Big 12
- Nickname: Bearcats
- Colors: Red and black
- Student section: The RUCkus
- All-time record: 1,953–1,111 (.637)
- NCAA tournament record: 46–32 (.590)

NCAA Division I tournament champions
- 1961, 1962
Other NCAA Division I tournament results
Runner-up	1963
Third place	1959, 1960
Final Four	1959, 1960, 1961, 1962, 1963, 1992
Elite Eight	1959, 1960, 1961, 1962, 1963, 1992, 1993, 1996
Sweet Sixteen	1958, 1959, 1960, 1961, 1962, 1963, 1966, 1975, 1992, 1993, 1996, 2001, 2012
Appearances	1958, 1959, 1960, 1961, 1962, 1963, 1966, 1975, 1976, 1977, 1992, 1993, 1994, 1995, 1996, 1997, 1998, 1999, 2000, 2001, 2002, 2003, 2004, 2005, 2011, 2012, 2013, 2014, 2015, 2016, 2017, 2018, 2019

Conference tournament champions
- Metro: 1976, 1977 GMC: 1992, 1993, 1994, 1995 C-USA: 1996, 1998, 2002, 2004 AAC: 2018, 2019

Conference regular-season champions
- BAA: 1926, 1928, 1929, 1930 MAC: 1947, 1948, 1949, 1950, 1951 MVC: 1958, 1959, 1960, 1961, 1962, 1963, 1966 GMC: 1992, 1993 C-USA: 1996, 1997, 1998, 1999, 2000, 2001, 2002, 2004 AAC: 2014, 2018, 2020

Uniforms
Home	Away	Alternate

The Cincinnati Bearcats men's basketball program represents the University of Cincinnati in Cincinnati, Ohio. The school's team competes in NCAA Division I as part of the Big 12 Conference, and are coached by Jerrod Calhoun.

With over 1800 all-time wins, the Bearcats are the 12th winningest basketball program of all time. The school's merits include 2 National Titles, 6 Final Fours, and 33 NCAA Division I men's basketball tournament appearances, including 5 consecutive appearances in the Final Four from 1959 to 1963, and 3 consecutive appearances from 1961 to 1963, the first school to accomplish both feats. As of 2026, Cincinnati had an all-time tournament record of 46–32 (.590). 42 All-American honors have been issued to Bearcats, while 39 Bearcat players have gone on to play in the NBA.

Cincinnati has played its home games at Fifth Third Arena since 1989, which received an $87 million renovation for the 2018 season. Cincinnati has been a member of nine athletic conferences in their history. They were members of the original Big East Conference from 2005 to 2013, and remained in conference when it was rebranded as the American Athletic Conference (AAC), during realignment. Cincinnati joined their current conference, the Big 12, in 2023.

== History ==
=== 1901–1954: Early teams ===
The first organized basketball team at Cincinnati began play in the 1901–1902 season, under coach Henry S. Pratt. The Bearcats went 5–4 in their inaugural season, and played home games in a gym in the basement of Arts & Sciences Hall, which featured pillars on the court. Cincinnati would join the Buckeye Athletic Association in 1925, and would leave it for the Mid-American Conference in 1946.

In the 1931–1932 season, Chester Smith became the first African-American to break the color barrier and play on the Bearcats' team. He saw no game action in that season, but would play regularly in the next two seasons.

=== 1954–1960: First Hall of Famers and NCAA tournament success ===
Cincinnati opened its new on-campus arena, Armory Fieldhouse, with a 97–65 win over Indiana in 1954. From 1951 to 1994, Jack Twyman played for the Bearcats, earning All-America status in 1954–55. He went on to a successful NBA career, earning 6 All-Star awards and 2 All-NBA Second Team awards. Twyman and is in the Basketball Hall of Fame., and has the annual NBA Twyman–Stokes Teammate of the Year award named after him and teammate Maurice Stokes, who he cared for in his later years.

Oscar Robertson made his debut in 1957, and quickly emerged as one of the top college players in the country. Nicknamed "The Big O", Robertson is recognized as one of the greatest point guards of all time. A unanimous three-time All-American, he was college basketball's all-time leading scorer at the close of his career. His 33.8 scoring average today ranks third on the NCAA career charts. Despite his success on the court, Robertson's college career was soured by racism. At the time, southern university programs such as Kentucky, Duke, and North Carolina did not recruit black athletes, and road trips to segregated cities were especially difficult, with Robertson often sleeping in college dorms instead of hotels.

The Bearcats celebrated their entry into the Missouri Valley Conference by winning the league title. Cincinnati made its first NCAA tournament appearance in 1958, losing to Kansas State in overtime at the Midwest Regional. In the subsequent two tournaments, the Bearcats would advanced to the Final Four in 1958–59 and 1959–60, settling for third place both years.

=== 1960–1964: Back to back championships ===
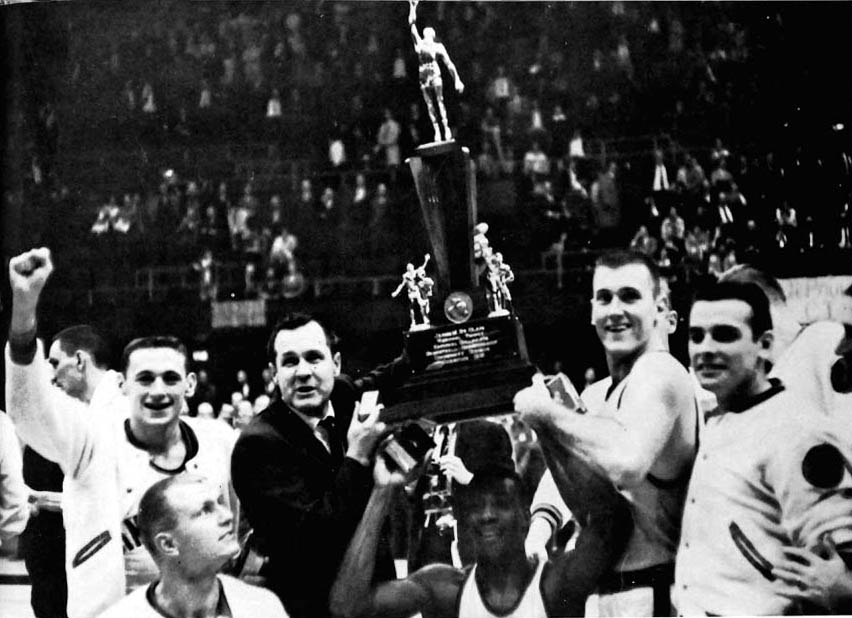
Cincinnati players and coach celebrating the national title in 1961

The Bearcats, under rookie head coach Ed Jucker and in their first season without Robertson, who graduated after the 1959–1960 season, won their first national title in 1960–61. Cincinnati then repeated as national champion in 1961–62, and made a fifth-straight trip to the Final Four in 1962–63, narrowly missed capturing a third-straight national crown when Loyola of Chicago overcame a 15-point deficit and defeated the Bearcats 60–58 in overtime.

During those five seasons, UC recorded a 37-game win streak and posted a 161–16 ledger. The five straight Final Four appearances is a feat topped only by UCLA. Connie Dierking (1958), Ralph Davis (1960), Bob Wiesenhahn (1961), Paul Hogue (1961, 1962), Tom Thacker (1963), Tony Yates (1963), Ron Bonham (1963, 1964) and George Wilson (1963) were accorded All-American recognition with Wilson playing on the U.S. 1964 Olympic gold medal team.

=== 1965-1983: Catlett and Badger eras ===
The Bearcats during the 1970s compiled a 170–85 record (.667). The success was led by flashy-dressing head coach Gale Catlett, who led the Bearcats to the NCAA tournament in the 1974–75 season returning Cincinnati to the Big Dance for the first time since the 1965–66 season. Cincinnati inaugurated the Metro Conference by winning the league's first two tournament championships and made four consecutive post-season appearances from 1974 to 1977, including a Sweet Sixteen appearance in 1975. Catlett was also a skilled recruiter, bringing Jim Ard (1970), Lloyd Batts (1973), Steve Collier (1976), Gary Yoder (1977), Bob Miller (1978) and Pat Cummings (1979) to Cincinnati who all earned All-American recognition. Cummings closed his career as UC's No. 2 leading scorer of all time.

After the 1977–78 campaign Catlett would leave to coach his alma mater West Virginia and Cincinnati hired Chicago Bulls head coach Ed Badger. A month into Badger's first season, the Bearcats were banned from postseason play and live television for two years due to numerous violations under Catlett, including recruiting violations and impermissible benefits. In 1981, Cincinnati would win the longest NCAA Division I basketball game against Bradley, which lasted seven overtime periods. Badger would have only two winning seasons during his tenure, and resigned after the 1983 season.

=== 1983–1989: Yates era ===
Tony Yates, a member of the national championship teams in the 1960s, succeeded Badger as head coach in 1983. In his first season in 1983–84, UC went 3–25 (0–14 in conference), the school's worst season (winning-percentage-wise) since going 1–9 in 1915. That season in a game against Kentucky, Yates had his players go into a four-corner spread and intentionally waste the clock against the No. 2 Wildcats. Boos rang out for most of the game and Kentucky refused to reschedule a series with Cincinnati after the end of the contract. This game was a factor that lead to the introduction of the shot clock for the 1985–86 season.

After tallying only two more winning seasons, Yates was fired after the 1989 season. The Bearcats of the 1980s failed to make a single NCAA tournament, and only had one postseason appearance in the 1985 NIT. The Bearcats, went 112–142 (.441) over the course of the decade and notched only two winning seasons.

=== 1989–2005: Huggins era ===
Bob Huggins, the former head coach at Akron, was named head coach at UC prior to the 1989–90 season. When Huggins was hired, the Bearcats had not earned a bid to the NCAA tournament since 1977. The Bearcats were invited to the NIT in his first two years, and then advanced to the Final Four of the 1992 NCAA tournament, Huggins' third season as coach. This was the first of 13 consecutive seasons in which the Bearcats appeared in the NCAA tournament. Overall, Huggins compiled a 399–127 (.759) record in his 16 years at Cincinnati, making him the winningest basketball coach in the school's history. Huggins directed Cincinnati to ten conference regular-season titles and eight league tournament titles. The Bearcats appeared in post-season play in each of Huggins' 16 seasons. In addition to their Final Four appearance in 1992, they advanced to the Elite Eight of the NCAA tournament two other times, in 1993 and 1996.

Fifteen Bearcats had garnered first team all-conference honors during this era with three of those, Danny Fortson, Kenyon Martin and Steve Logan, picking up a total of four C-USA Most Outstanding Player Awards. Fortson, Nick Van Exel, Ruben Patterson, Bobby Brannen, Melvin Levett, Logan, Martin and Pete Mickeal have joined Cincinnati's list of All-Americans. Fortson was a consensus first team All-American in 1996–97 after receiving second team recognition in 1995–96. Martin was college basketball's top player of the 1999–2000 season, making a clean sweep of the national player of the year awards. Logan was a consensus All-American in 2001–02 and a finalist for every national player of the year award. Several Bearcats were NBA draft picks, including Martin being the number one overall pick in 2000.

Huggins was forced to resign by school president Nancy Zimpher in August 2005, following Huggins' arrest for DUI in 2004 and Zimpher's goals to improve UC's academic reputation. The school promoted assistant coach Andy Kennedy as interim head coach for the 2005–06 season.

=== 2006–2019: Cronin era ===
In the spring of 2006, Mick Cronin was hired as head coach, replacing interim coach Andy Kennedy after the dismissal of Bob Huggins. Cronin was tasked with picking up the pieces from a depleted program after Huggins was abruptly asked to resign three months before the 2005 season, and a temporary coach in Kennedy for the previous season. Due to the school having little-to-no recruiting going on for around a full calendar year, Cronin was forced to scrounge for players. He even had a couple players on the school's football team play, one being future NFL linebacker Connor Barwin.

Although the Bearcats continued to finish with losing seasons early in Cronin's tenure, the school's win total increased each of his first five seasons, and were the only men's basketball program in a major conference to improve their win total every season from 2007 to 2011. This culminated in an NCAA tournament appearance in 2011, their first since the 2005 tournament.

During the 2014–15 season, Mick Cronin discovered he had an arterial dissection and sat out the rest of the season, last coaching December 17 against San Diego State. Assistant Coach, Larry Davis took over head coaching responsibilities and lead the Bearcats to a berth in the NCAA tournament and a first round win over Purdue.

In the 2018 NCAA tournament the #2 Bearcats' led their first round opponent, Nevada, by 22 points with 11 minutes remaining. Nevada mounted a furious comeback, scoring 16 straight points over the next 3 minutes. With 9 seconds left, Nevada took their first and only lead of the game at 75–73, and would hold on to upset Cincinnati. The defeat tied the second largest comeback to-date in NCAA Tournament history.

In the 2013–14 and 2017–18 seasons Cincinnati were American Athletic Conference regular season champions. In the 2017–18 and 2018–19 seasons Cincinnati won the American Athletic Conference men's basketball tournament. During this time many notable players came to Cincinnati with several progressing to the NBA, such as Sean Kilpatrick, Troy Caupain, Jacob Evans, and Gary Clark. The Bearcats also featured consecutive AAC Player-of-the-Year (POY) winners in Gary Clark and Jarron Cumberland.

=== 2019–present: Brannen, Miller, & Calhoun eras ===
On April 9, 2019, it was announced that Mick Cronin would be leaving Cincinnati to become the next head coach of the UCLA Bruins after UCLA had fired head coach Steve Alford earlier in the season (ironically, his firing was due in part to a blowout loss to the Bearcats). On April 14, 2019, it was announced that John Brannen was being hired as the new head coach.

In his first year, Brannen would lead the Bearcats to a share of the regular season AAC championship before both the AAC tournament and the NCAA tournament were cancelled due to COVID-19. In Brannen's second season, the team struggled to find its footing and dealt with 5 COVID related opt-outs and a 25-day program pause. The Bearcats would finish 12–11 but enjoyed a surprising run in the 2021 AAC tournament before losing in the final.

On March 26, John Cunningham, the school's athletic director, announced the university would begin investigating allegations against the program. Soon after on April 3, it was announced that head coach John Brannen was placed on indefinite leave. Finally, on April 9 the school announced Brannen had been relieved of his duties effective immediately along with assistants.

On April 14, 2021, Cincinnati hired Wes Miller to become their next head coach, replacing Brannen. In September 2021, Cincinnati was invited to the Big 12 Conference, alongside fellow American members Houston and UCF, as part of the greater realignment in the NCAA. The Bearcats would accept the invitation, and begin competing in Big 12 basketball in the 2023-2024 season.

Cincinnati and Miller agreed to part ways after the 2025–26 season, after a fifth straight year with no NCAA tournament appearances. His tenure ended with a record of 100–74 (.575).

On March 23, 2026, Matt Norlander of CBS Sports reported that Utah State head coach Jerrod Calhoun had agreed in writing to become the next head coach of the Bearcats. Calhoun had been a student at Cincinnati, including a stint as a student assistance under Bob Huggins, and had also worked on Huggins' staff at West Virginia from 2007 to 2012. Calhoun's hiring was officially announced by Cincinnati the following day, March 24.

== Rivalries ==
=== Xavier ===
Cincinnati's main basketball rivalry is Xavier University. The two schools play annually in the Skyline Chili Crosstown Shootout. Cincinnati's record in the Shootout is 52–41 (.559), last winning the matchup in 2024.

=== Louisville ===
UC and Louisville were rivals, first playing in 1921, until the 2010–13 NCAA conference realignment put the contest on hiatus, as Louisville moved to the Atlantic Coast Conference on July 1, 2014. The rivalry has stretched over the span of four conferences from the Missouri Valley Conference, to the Metro Conference to Conference USA, and more recently in the Big East Conference, which in 2013 was renamed to the American Athletic Conference. The teams have faced off 101 times in series history, with Louisville leading the all-time series 53–43 (.552). Most notably, Louisville and Cincinnati faced each other twice over the course of the 2011-12 season. UC would upset then No. 17 ranked Louisville at home before facing off again in the 2012 Big East men's basketball tournament championship game, where Louisville would prevail 50–44.

=== Memphis ===
First playing in 1968, Cincinnati and Memphis have been longtime conference rivals from the Missouri Valley Conference, to the Metro Conference, Great Midwest Conference, Conference USA, and currently in the American Athletic Conference though Cincinnati is scheduled to leave for the Big 12 Conference in 2023. The teams have faced off 86 times in basketball series history, with Cincinnati leading the all-time series 47–38 (.553).

Famously, Cincinnati beat Penny Hardaway's Tigers four times in the 1991–92 season, including in the Elite Eight on the way to the program's sixth Final Four appearance.

=== Other rivals ===
UC and Dayton have faced off 91 times, with UC leading the all-time series 60–31. The teams first played in 1907 and would face off regularly, last playing each other in 2025.

Cincinnati also has a longtime rivalry with Miami (OH) having played a total of 148 times since 1904, with UC leading the series 97–52 (.651). Similarly to Dayton, the series was played frequently until it came to a halt in 2011. However, for the 2021–22 season the Bearcats announced they would travel to Oxford to play Miami (OH), resuming the series for the first time in a decade, winning 59–58.

== Postseason history ==
=== NCAA Tournament seeding history ===
Years →	'92	'93	'94	'95	'96	'97	'98	'99	'00	'01	'02	'03	'04	'05	'11	'12	'13	'14	'15	'16	'17	'18	'19
Seeds→	4	2	8	7	2	3	2	3	2	5	1	8	4	7	6	6	10	5	8	9	6	2	7

=== NCAA tournament results ===
The Bearcats have appeared in the NCAA tournament 33 times. Their combined record is 46–32. They have been to six Final Fours, including five in a row from 1959 to 1963, and are two time National Champions (1961, 1962). UC has been to the Sweet Sixteen six times since 1967, with its last Sweet Sixteen appearance in 2012.

Year	Seed	Round	Opponent	Result
1958		Sweet Sixteen; Regional 3rd-place game	Kansas State; Arkansas	L 80–83 ^{OT} W 97–62
1959		Sweet Sixteen; Elite Eight; Final Four; National 3rd-place game	TCU; Kansas State; California; Louisville	W 77–72; W 85–75; L 58–64; W 98–85
1960		Sweet Sixteen; Elite Eight; Final Four; National 3rd-place game	DePaul; Kansas; California; NYU	W 99–59; W 82–71; L 69–77; W 95–71
1961		Sweet Sixteen; Elite Eight; Final Four; National Championship Game	Texas Tech; Kansas State; Utah; Ohio State	W 78–55; W 69–64; W 82–67; W 70–65 ^{OT}
1962		Sweet Sixteen; Elite Eight; Final Four; National Championship Game	Creighton; Colorado; UCLA; Ohio State	W 66–46; W 73–46; W 72–70; W 71–59
1963		Sweet Sixteen; Elite Eight; Final Four; National Championship Game	Texas; Colorado; Oregon State; Loyola–Chicago	W 73–68; W 67–60; W 80–46; L 58–60 ^{OT}
1966		Sweet Sixteen; Regional 3rd-place game	Texas Western; SMU	L 76–78; L 84–89
1975		First round Sweet Sixteen; Regional 3rd-place game	Texas A&M; Louisville; Notre Dame	W 87–79; L 63–78; W 95–87
1976		First round	Notre Dame	L 78–79
1977		First round	Marquette	L 51–66
1992	No. 4	First round Second round Sweet Sixteen; Elite Eight; Final Four	No. 13 Delaware; No. 5 Michigan State; No. 9 UTEP; No. 6 Memphis; No. 6 Michigan	W 85–47; W 77–65; W 69–67; W 88–57; L 72–76
1993	No. 2	First round Second round Sweet Sixteen; Elite Eight	No. 15 Coppin State; No. 7 New Mexico State; No. 6 Virginia; No. 1 North Carolina	W 93–66; W 92–55; W 71–54; L 68–75 ^{OT}
1994	No. 8	First round	No. 9 Wisconsin	L 72–80
1995	No. 7	First round Second round	No. 10 Temple; No. 2 Connecticut	W 77–71; L 91–96
1996	No. 2	First round Second round Sweet Sixteen; Elite Eight	No. 15 UNC Greensboro; No. 7 Temple; No. 3 Georgia Tech; No. 5 Mississippi State	W 66–61; W 78–65; W 87–70; L 63–73
1997	No. 3	First round Second round	No. 14 Butler; No. 6 Iowa State	W 86–69; L 67–66
1998	No. 2	First round Second round	No. 15 Northern Arizona; No. 10 West Virginia	W 65–62; L 74–75
1999	No. 3	First round Second round	No. 14 George Mason; No. 6 Temple	W 72–48; L 54–64
2000	No. 2	First round Second round	No. 15 UNC Wilmington; No. 7 Tulsa	W 64–47; L 61–69
2001	No. 5	First round Second round Sweet Sixteen	No. 12 BYU; No. 13 Kent State; No. 1 Stanford	W 84–59; W 66–43; L 65–78
2002	No. 1	First round Second round	No. 16 Boston University; No. 8 UCLA	W 90–52; L 101–105
2003	No. 8	First round	No. 9 Gonzaga	L 69–74
2004	No. 4	First round Second round	No. 13 East Tennessee State; No. 5 Illinois	W 80–77; L 68–92
2005	No. 7	First round Second round	No. 10 Iowa; No. 2 Kentucky	W 76–64; L 60–69
2011	No. 6	First round Second round	No. 11 Missouri; No. 3 Connecticut	W 78–63; L 58–69
2012	No. 6	First round Second round Sweet Sixteen	No. 11 Texas; No. 3 Florida State; No. 2 Ohio State	W 65–59; W 62–56; L 66–81
2013	No. 10	First round	No. 7 Creighton	L 63–67
2014	No. 5	First round	No. 12 Harvard	L 57–61
2015	No. 8	First round Second round	No. 9 Purdue; No. 1 Kentucky	W 66–65 ^{OT} L 51–64
2016	No. 9	First round	No. 8 Saint Joseph's	L 76–78
2017	No. 6	First round Second round	No. 11 Kansas State; No. 3 UCLA	W 75–61; L 67–79
2018	No. 2	First round Second round	No. 15 Georgia State; No. 7 Nevada	W 68–53; L 73–75
2019	No. 7	First round	No. 10 Iowa	L 72–79

=== NIT results ===
The Bearcats have appeared in the NIT 12 times. Their combined record is 12–11, most notably placing 3rd in 1955.

Year	Round	Opponent	Result
1951	First round	St. Bonaventure	L 67–70 ^{2OT}
1955	Quarterfinals; Semifinals; 3rd-place game	Niagara; Duquesne; St. Francis (Pa.)	W 85–83 ^{2OT} L 51–65; W 95–91
1957	First round	St. Bonaventure	L 72–90
1970	First round	Army	L 67–72
1974	First round	Boston College	L 62–72
1985	First round Second round	Kent State; Marquette	W 77–61; L 54–56
1990	First round Second round	Bowling Green; DePaul	W 75–60; L 59–61
1991	First round Second round	Ball State; Oklahoma	W 82–55; L 81–89 ^{OT}
2006	First round Second round Quarterfinals	Charlotte; Minnesota; South Carolina	W 86–80; W 76–62; L 62–65
2010	First round Second round	Weber State; Dayton	W 76–62; L 66–81
2023	First round Second round Quarterfinals	Virginia Tech; Hofstra; Utah Valley	W 81–72; W 79–65; L 68–74
2024	First round Second round Quarterfinals	San Francisco; Bradley; Indiana State	W 73–72 ^{OT} W 74–57; L 81–85

=== CBI results ===
The Bearcats have appeared in the College Basketball Invitational once. Their record is 0–1.

Year	Round	Opponent	Result
2008	First round	Bradley	L 67–70

=== CBC results ===
Cincinnati has appeared in the College Basketball Crown once. Their overall record is 1–1.

Year	Round	Opponent	Result
2025	First Round; Quarterfinals	DePaul; UCF	W 83–61; L 80–88

== Record vs. Big 12 Conference Opponents ==
This table reflects the results of match-ups between Cincinnati and Big 12 Conference opponents.

Updated through the end of the 2023-24 NCAA Division I men's basketball season.

Team	Wins	Losses	Winning percentage	Streak
Arizona	0	4	.000	Lost 4
Arizona State	1	2	.333	Lost 1
Baylor	0	2	.000	Lost 2
BYU	2	1	.667	Won 2
Colorado	7	1	.875	Lost 1
Houston	33	16	.673	Lost 11
Iowa State	4	3	.571	Lost 1
Kansas	5	4	.556	Win 1
Kansas State	8	1	.889	Won 8
Oklahoma State	2	4	.333	Lost 1
TCU	6	1	.857	Lost 1
Texas Tech	2	0	1.000	Won 1
UCF	16	5	.762	Won 4
Utah	2	1	.667	Lost 1
West Virginia	11	8	.579	Won 2
Total	99	53	.651	
Source: Sports Reference

== Awards ==
=== Player of the Year Awards ===
- 1959, 1960 – Oscar Robertson, USBWA College Player of the Year
- 2000 – Kenyon Martin, Consensus National Player of the Year (USBWA, AP, Naismith, Wooden, Rupp)

=== All-Americans ===
Cincinnati has had 31 different players receive All-American honors while at UC. The award has been given to a Consensus 1st-Team All-American 8 times.

==== Consensus 1st Team All-Americans ====
- 1958, 1959, 1960 – Oscar Robertson
- 1963 – Ron Bonham
- 1963 – Tom Thacker
- 1997 – Danny Fortson
- 2000 – Kenyon Martin
- 2002 – Steve Logan

==== Consensus 2nd Team, 3rd Team, Freshmen and Honorable Mention All-Americans ====
- 1948, 1949, 1950 – Dick Dallmer
- 1955 – Jack Twyman
- 1958 – Connie Dierking
- 1960 – Ralph Davis
- 1961 – Bob Wiesenhahn
- 1961, 1962 – Paul Hogue
- 1962, 1963 – Tony Yates
- 1963 – George Wilson
- 1964 – Ron Bonham
- 1967 – Mike Rolf
- 1970 – Jim Ard
- 1973, 1974 – Lloyd Batts
- 1976 – Steve Collier
- 1977 – Gary Yoder
- 1978 – Bob Miller
- 1979 – Pat Cummings
- 1992 – Herb Jones
- 1993 – Nick Van Exel
- 1994 – Dontonio Wingfield
- 1995, 1996 – Danny Fortson
- 1998 – Bobby Brannen
- 1998 – Ruben Patterson
- 1999 – Melvin Levett
- 1999 – Kenyon Martin
- 2000 – DerMarr Johnson
- 2000 – Pete Mickeal
- 2001 – Steve Logan
- 2014 – Sean Kilpatrick
- 2018 – Gary Clark
- 2019 – Jarron Cumberland

=== Conference Player of the Year ===
Year	Player	Conference
1969–70	Jim Ard	Missouri Valley
1976–77	Gary Yoder	Metro
1978–79	Pat Cummings	Metro
1995–96; 1996–97	Danny Fortson	Conference USA
1999–00	Kenyon Martin	Conference USA
2000–01; 2001–02	Steve Logan	Conference USA
2017–18	Gary Clark	American
2018–19	Jarron Cumberland	American

=== Conference Tournament MVP ===
Year	Player	Conference
1977	Gary Yoder	Metro
1996	Danny Fortson	Conference USA
1998	Kenyon Martin	Conference USA
2002	Steve Logan	Conference USA
2004	Tony Bobbitt	Conference USA
2018	Gary Clark	American
2019	Jarron Cumberland	American

=== Naismith Hall of Fame Members ===
The following Cincinnati coaches and players have been enshrined in the Naismith Memorial Basketball Hall of Fame.

Year Inducted	Name	Position	Years at Cincinnati
1980	Oscar Robertson	Player	1957–1960
1983	Jack Twyman	Player	1951–1955
2022	Bob Huggins	Coach	1989–2005

=== Olympians ===
The following Cincinnati players have represented their country in basketball in the Summer Olympic Games:

Year	Player/Coach	Country	Location	Medal
1960	Oscar Robertson	United States	Rome	Gold
1964	George Wilson	United States	Tokyo	Gold

=== McDonald's All-Americans ===
The following were McDonald's All-Americans in high school that committed to, and played for, the University of Cincinnati.

Year	Player
1984	Roger McClendon
1991	Keith LeGree**
1993	Dontonio Wingfield
1993	Damon Flint
1994	Danny Fortson
1999	DerMarr Johnson
1999	Kenny Satterfield
2001	James White**
2004	Mike Williams**
2009	Lance Stephenson
2022	Dillon Mitchell**

(**) Originally played collegiate basketball elsewhere, but transferred to Cincinnati.

=== Mr. Basketball Winners ===
The following were Mr. Basketball winners in high school that committed to, and played for, the University of Cincinnati.

Year	Player	State
1956	Oscar Robertson	Indiana
1960	Ron Bonham	Indiana
1974	Steve Collier	Indiana
1978	Doug Schloemer	Kentucky
1991	Dontonio Wingfield	Georgia
1993	Damon Flint	Ohio
1999	Leonard Stokes	New York
2000	Field Williams	Texas
2005	Devan Downey	South Carolina
2009	Lance Stephenson	New York

== Retired numbers ==
Cincinnati Bearcats retired numbers
No.	Player	Position	Tenure
4	Kenyon Martin	C	1996–2000
12	Oscar Robertson	G	1957–1960
27	Jack Twyman	F	1951–1955

== 1,000-point scorers ==
The Bearcats currently have 58 players in their 1,000-point club.

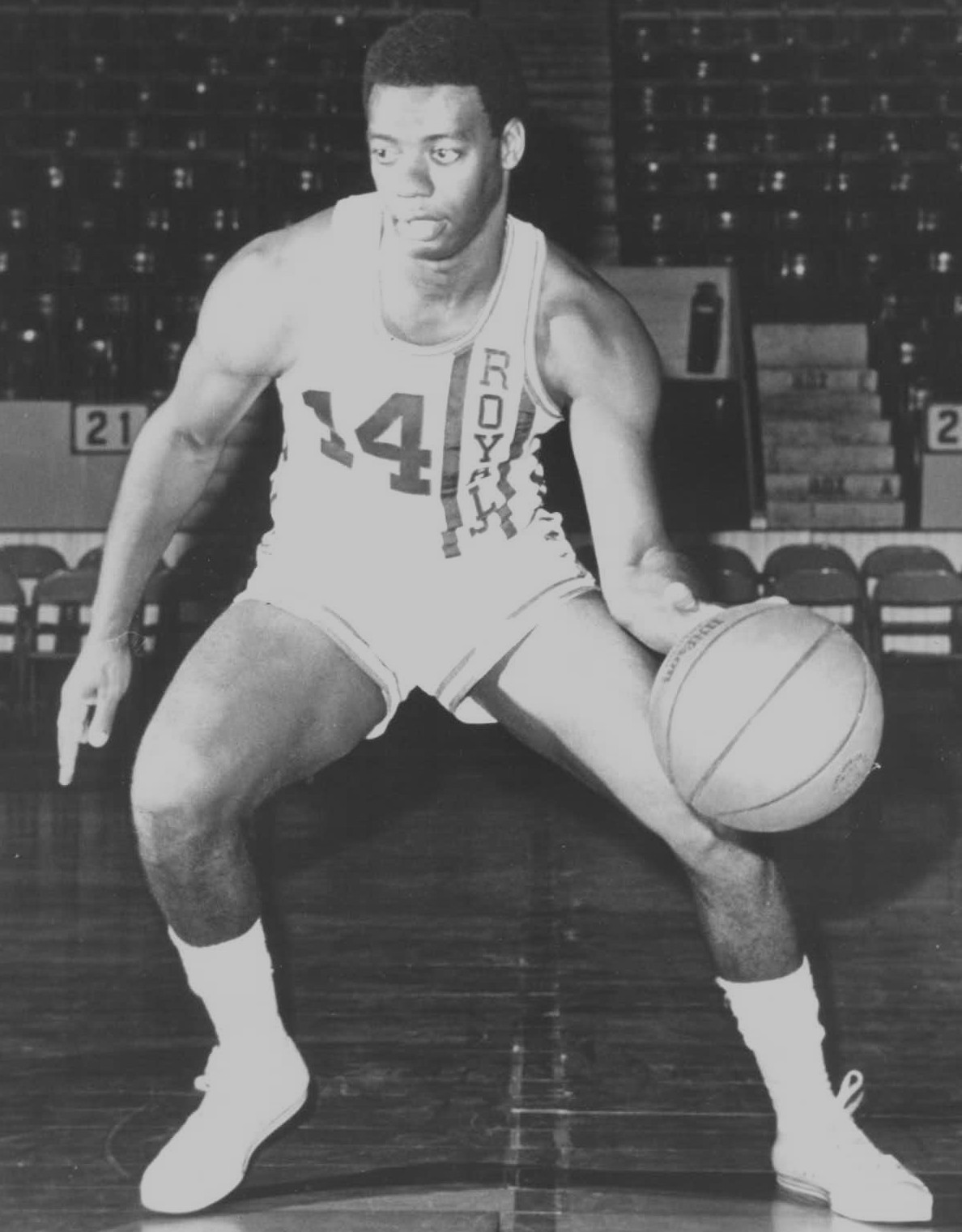
Oscar Robertson scored 2,973 points, with an impressive 33.8 PPG average.

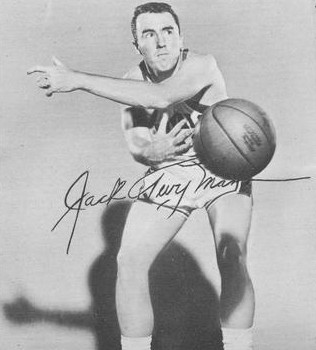
Jack Twyman scored 1,598 points.

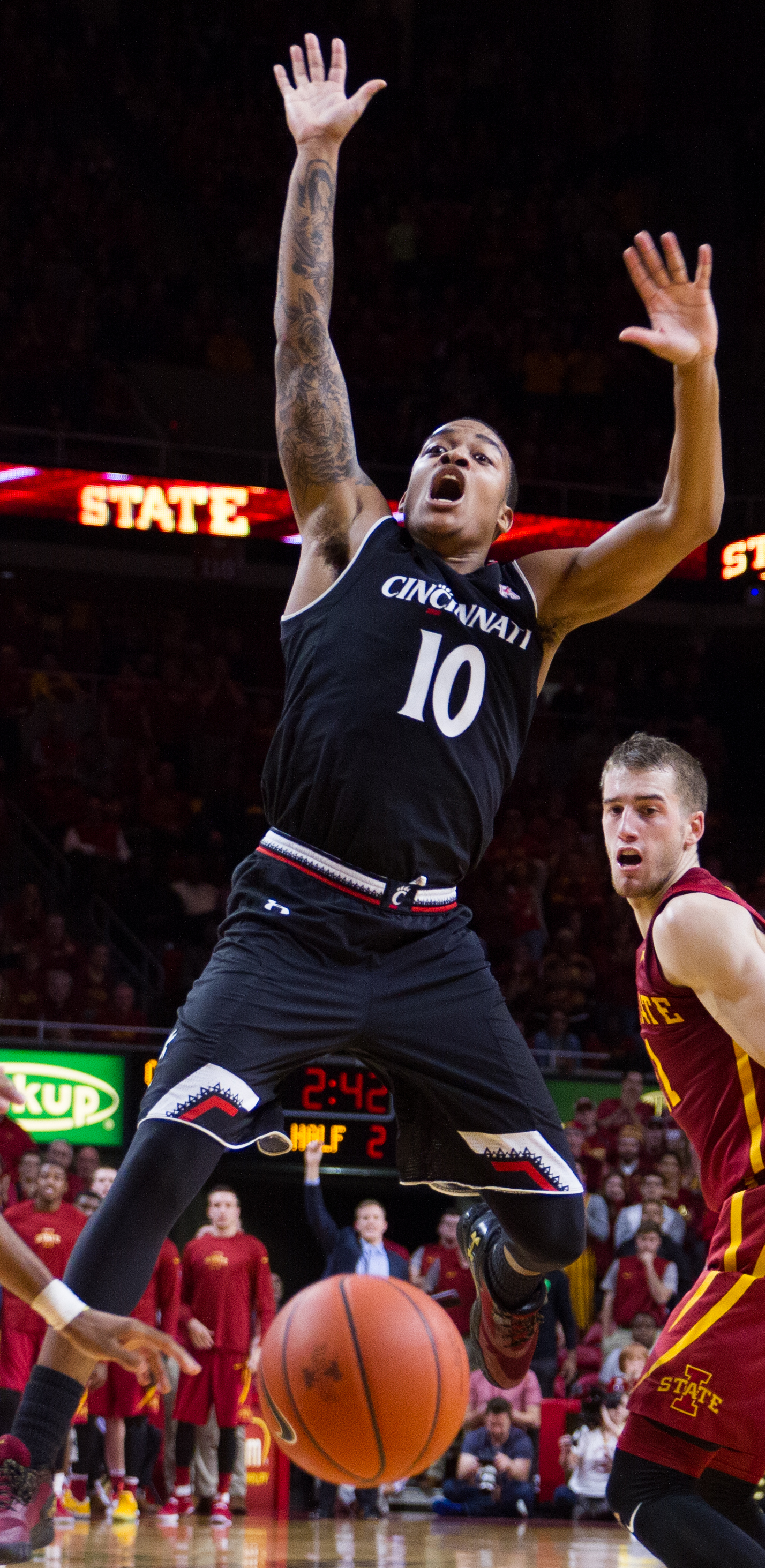
Troy Caupain scored 1,317 points.

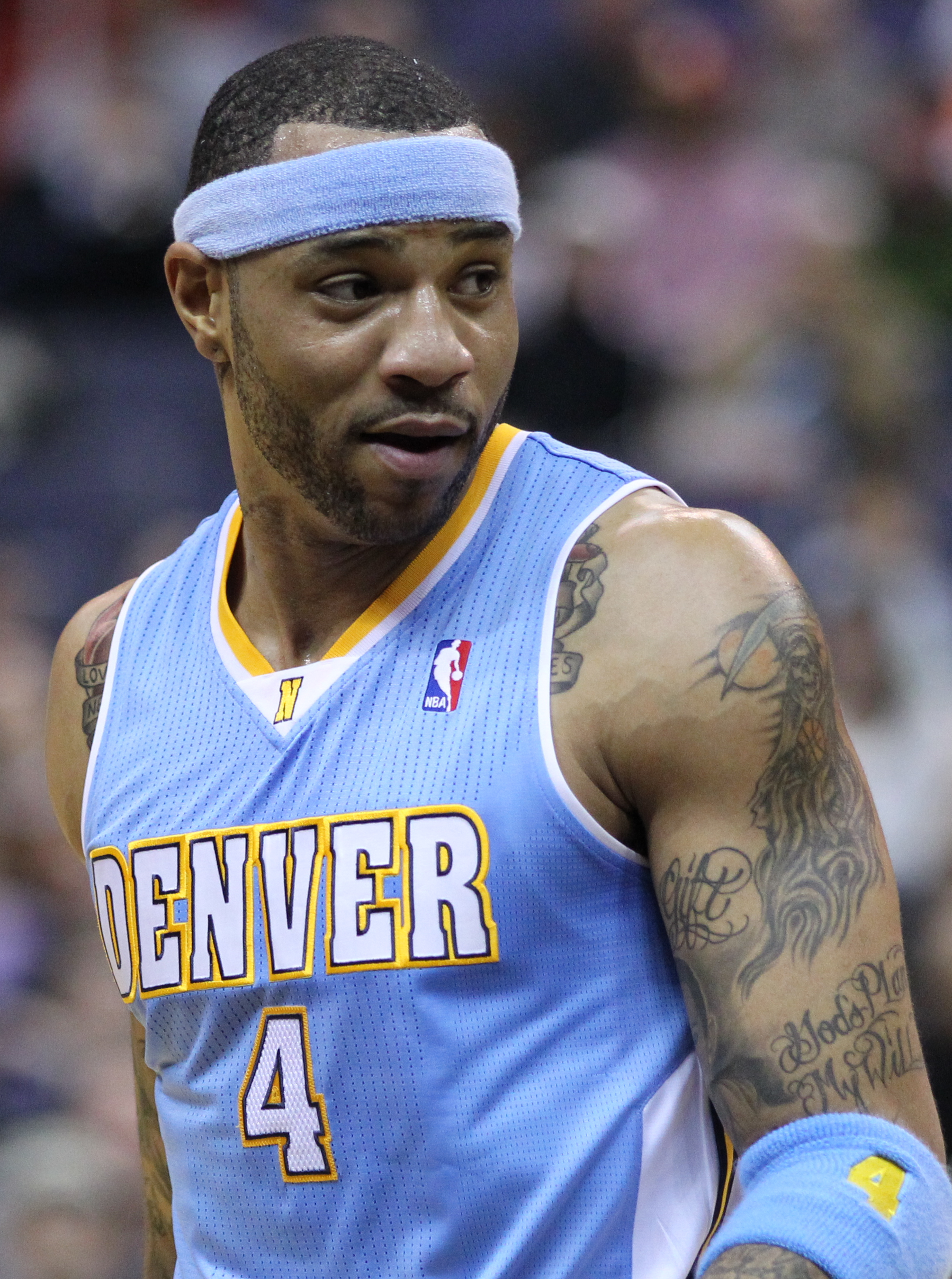
Kenyon Martin scored 1,279 points.

Rank	Player	Number	Years	Games	Points	AVG
1	Oscar Robertson	#12	1957–1960	88	2,973	33.8
2	Sean Kilpatrick	#23	2010–2014	140	2,145	15.3
3	Steve Logan	#22	1998–2002	135	1,985	14.7
4	Deonta Vaughn	#5	2006–2010	129	1,885	14.6
5	Danny Fortson	#25	1994–1997	100	1,881	18.8
6	Roger McClendon	#21	1984–1988	114	1,789	15.7
7	Jarron Cumberland	#34	2016–2020	133	1,782	13.4
8	Pat Cummings	#6	1975–1979	103	1,762	17.1
9	Ron Bonham	#21	1961–1964	85	1,666	19.6
10	Louis Banks	#25	1987–1991	118	1,644	13.9
11	Jack Twyman	#27	1951–1955	90	1,598	17.8
12	Lloyd Batts	#31	1972–1974	79	1,585	20.1
13	Darnell Burton	#33	1994–1997	130	1,584	12.2
14	Jason Maxiell	#54	2001–2005	129	1,566	12.1
15	Bob Miller	#41	1975–1978	116	1,498	12.9
16	Yancy Gates	#34	2008–2012	132	1,485	11.3
17	Gary Clark	#11	2014–2018	139	1,462	10.5
18	Dwight Jones	#45	1979–1982	112	1,451	13.0
19	Paul Hogue	#22	1960–1962	91	1,391	15.3
20	Bobby Austin	#25	1979–1982	111	1,385	12.5
21	Derrek Dickey	#40	1971–1973	78	1,328	17.0
22	Levertis Robinson	#20	1988–1991	112	1,320	11.8
23	Leonard Stokes	#13	2000–2003	129	1,318	10.2
24	Troy Caupain	#10	2013–2017	139	1,317	9.6
25	Cashmere Wright	#1	2009–2013	139	1,317	9.6
26	Damon Flint	#3	1994–1997	127	1,316	10.4
27	Dion Dixon	#3	2008–2012	137	1,281	9.4
28	Kenyon Martin	#4	1997–2000	116	1,279	11.0
29	Jim Ard	#11	1967–1970	76	1,256	16.5
30	Steve Collier	#31	1975–1978	114	1,252	10.9
31	Jacob Evans	#1	2015–2018	105	1,233	11.7
32	Eric Hicks	#14	2003–2006	123	1,231	10.0
33	LaZelle Durden	#23	1993–1995	90	1,219	13.5
34	Rick Roberson	#35	1967–1969	76	1,196	15.7
35	David DeJulius	#5	2020–2023	88	1,187	13.4
36	Keith Williams	#2	2018–2021	121	1,156	9.6
37	Tom Thacker	#25	1961–1963	89	1,152	12.9
38	Jim Holstein	#27	1950–1952	75	1,146	15.3
39	George Wilson	#32	1962–1964	85	1,124	13.2
40	Bill Lammert	#26	1952–1955	92	1,119	12.2
41	Melvin Levett	#21	1996–1999	120	1,119	9.3
42	Dick Dallmer	#39	1947–1950	98	1,098	11.2
43	Herb Jones	#34	1991–1992	64	1,097	17.1
44	Ralph Davis	#21	1958–1960	88	1,093	12.4
45	Bill Westerfeld	#29	1946–1949	99	1,092	11.0
46	James White	#21	2003–2006	93	1,088	11.7
47	Day Day Thomas	#1	2023–2026	100	1,069	10.7
48	Eddie Lee	#20	1975–1979	103	1,068	10.4
49	Brian Williams	#45	1975–1977	85	1,066	12.5
50	Jeremiah Davenport	#24	2019–2023	109	1,060	9.7
51	Don Ogletree	#25	1968–1970	78	1,059	13.6
52	Mike Jones	#14	1975–1978	114	1,058	9.3
53	Phil Wheeler	#30	1954–1956	72	1,055	14.7
54	Ralph Richter	#25	1947–1950	81	1,053	13.0
55	Field Williams	#2	2000–2004	126	1,030	8.2
56	Jizzle James	#2	2023–2026	95	1,023	10.8
57	John Howard	#20	1966–1968	79	1,013	12.8
58	David Kennedy	#10	1978–1981	98	1,002	10.2

== Bearcats in the NBA ==
The Bearcats have had 40 players play in the NBA, spanning seven decades, as of 2023.

Player	Years	Seasons	Draft	NBA Earnings	NBA Accomplishments
Jim Holstein	1952–1956	4	Territorial choice	N/A	2× NBA champion
Jack Twyman*	1955–1966	11	Territorial choice	N/A	6× NBA All-Star, 2× All-NBA Second Team, No. 27 retired by Cincinnati Royals. An NBA award introduced in 2013, the Twyman–Stokes Teammate of the Year Award, is named in part for him.
Connie Dierking	1958–1971	13	1st round, 6th overall	N/A	
Wayne Stevens	1959–1960	1	7th round, 49th overall	N/A	
Ralph Davis	1960–1962	2	3rd round, 17th overall	N/A	
Oscar Robertson*	1960–1974	14	1st round, 1st overall	N/A	12× NBA All-Star, 9× All-NBA First Team, NBA champion, NBA Most Valuable Player, NBA Rookie of the Year, 6× NBA assists leader, all-time triple-double leader, No. 14 and No. 1 retired by the Cincinnati Royals and Milwaukee Bucks
Bob Wiesenhahn	1961–1962	1	2nd round, 11th overall	N/A	
Paul Hogue	1962–1964	2	1st round, 2nd overall	N/A	
Tom Thacker	1963–1971	8	Territorial choice	N/A	NBA champion
Ron Bonham	1964–1968	3	2nd round, 16th overall	N/A	2× NBA champion
George Wilson	1964–1971	7	Territorial choice	N/A	
Roland West	1967–1968	1	8th round, 73rd overall	N/A	
Rick Roberson	1969–1976	7	1st round, 15th overall	N/A	
Jim Ard	1970–1978	8	1st round, 6th overall	N/A	NBA champion
Derrek Dickey	1973–1978	5	2nd round, 29th overall	N/A	NBA champion
Lloyd Batts	1974–1975	1	4th round, 60th overall	N/A	
Pat Cummings	1979–1989	10	3rd round, 59th overall	N/A	
Bob Miller	1983–1984	1	4th round, 58th overall	N/A	
Mike Williams	1989–1992	3	3rd round, 51st overall	N/A	
Corie Blount	1993–2005	12	1st round, 25th overall	$14,441,735	
Nick Van Exel	1993–2006	13	2nd round, 37th overall	$74,408,867	NBA All-Star, NBA All-Rookie Second Team, Top 25 all-time in made 3-point FGs
Dontonio Wingfield	1994–1998	4	2nd round, 37th overall	$1,475,000	
Danny Fortson	1997–2007	10	1st round, 10th overall	$42,145,240	
Ruben Patterson	1998–2008	10	2nd round, 31st overall	$36,858,397	
DerMarr Johnson	2000–2008	7	1st round, 6th overall	$9,283,842	
Kenyon Martin	2000–2015	15	1st round, 1st overall	$113,035,975	NBA All-Star, NBA All-Rookie First Team, started in 10 NBA Finals games
Art Long	2001–2004	3	Undrafted	$720,093	
Kenny Satterfield	2001–2003	2	2nd round, 54th overall	$845,252	
Tony Bobbitt	2004–2005	1	Undrafted	$305,403	
Jason Maxiell	2005–2015	10	1st round, 26th overall	$28,614,821	
Robert Whaley	2005–2006	1	2nd round, 51st overall	$481,788	
James White	2006–2013	3	2nd round, 31st overall	$1,672,542	NBA champion, NBA Slam Dunk Contest participant
Lance Stephenson	2010–2021	10	2nd round, 40th overall	$30,986,672	2013–14 triple-doubles leader
Sean Kilpatrick	2015–2018	4	Undrafted	$6,108,580	
Jacob Evans	2018–2020	2	1st round, 28th overall	$3,370,822	
Gary Clark	2018–2022	4	Undrafted	$3,700,000	
Troy Caupain	2018–2019	1	Undrafted	N/A	
Trevon Scott	2022–2022	1	Undrafted	N/A	
Jarron Cumberland	2022–2022	1	Undrafted	N/A	
Tari Eason	2022–present	5	1st round, 17th overall	$4,064,312	
Baba Miller	2026–present	1	2nd round, 36th overall	N/A	

*Basketball Hall of Famer

== Bearcats in G-league ==
Name	G-League team	Seasons as Bearcat
Jarron Cumberland	Delaware Blue Coats	2016–20
Trevon Scott	Osceola Magic	2016–20

== Bearcats in international leagues ==
- Gary Clark player for Yokohama B-Corsairs of the B.League
- Troy Caupain player for UCAM Murcia CB of Spanish Liga ACB
- Octavius Ellis player for BC Uralmash Yekaterinburg of the VTB United League
- David DeJulius player for Maccabi Tel Aviv B.C. of the Israeli Basketball Premier League
- Adam Hrycaniuk player for Arka Gdynia of the Polish Basketball League
- John Newman III player for Kortrijk Spurs of the BNXT League
- Landers Nolley II player for Aris B.C. of the Greek Basketball League
- Ibrahima Thomas player for AS Douanes of the Basketball Africa League

== Fifth Third Arena ==
The Bearcats have played their home games in Fifth Third Arena since 1989. The arena is on-campus and has a capacity of 12,012 (with room for overflow). It is located in the Myrl H. Shoemaker Center, which was also the name of the arena until 2005, when it was named for Cincinnati-based Fifth Third Bank. It is still popularly known as "The Shoe". The Bearcats held a 42-game home win streak from 1997 to 2000. In the 1999–2000 season, every Bearcat home game was sold out. During the Bob Huggins era, it was known as one of the most hostile arenas in the nation due to the high decibel levels typical of his tenure.

On December 15, 2015, The UC Board of Trustees approved an $87-million, privately funded renovation of Fifth Third Arena. Proposed improvements to the facility, include the creation of a 360-degree seating bowl, new HD scoreboard, ribbon boards, sound system, an LED lighting system which will allow for enhanced gameday presentation, new restroom and concession facilities, a new upper-level concourse with its own fan amenities, expanded food and beverage options and a new main entrance and plaza with centralized ticketing and guest services. Construction began in April 2017 and was completed in fall 2018. During the 2017–18 school year, men's basketball home games were moved to BB&T Arena at Northern Kentucky University in Highland Heights, Kentucky, while women's basketball and volleyball home games were moved to the campus of St. Ursula Academy. The Bearcats began play in the newly renovated arena with a home game against Ohio State on November 7, 2018.

The Bearcats have a 475–107 (.816) overall record in Fifth Third Arena as of the end of the 2024–25 season.

== See also ==
- University of Cincinnati
- Cincinnati Bearcats
- Fifth Third Arena
- Jerrod Calhoun
- NCAA Men's Division I Final Four appearances by coaches
