= 1964–65 Cincinnati Royals season =

NBA professional basketball team season

- Head coach: Jack McMahon
- Owners: Louis Jacobs
- Arena: Cincinnati Gardens

Results
- Record: 48–32 (.600)
- Place: Division: 2nd (Eastern)
- Playoff finish: Division semifinals (lost to 76ers 1–3)
- Stats at Basketball Reference

Local media
- Television: WKRC-TV
- Radio: WLW

The 1964–65 season was the Royals' 19th season in the NBA and eighth in Cincinnati. By the end of the season, Oscar Robertson's career statistics for the first five years of his career averaged out to a triple double: 30.3 points per game, 10.4 rebounds per game, and 10.6 assists per game. The season began with high hopes as the Royals had played well the previous season against Boston and were improving as a team. In addition to Robertson, second-year big man Jerry Lucas rose to superstar status this season. He averaged 21 points and 20 rebounds over 66 games played. He joined Robertson on the All-NBA First Team named at the season's conclusion. Injuries, though, were a big factor this season. Key guard Arlen Bockhorn was lost to a career-ending injury in November. The other four opening-day starters, Robertson, Lucas, Jack Twyman and Wayne Embry, were each lost for several games or more also. Lucas was named MVP of the 1965 NBA All-Star Game. But the same day's events saw superstar Wilt Chamberlain traded to the rival Philadelphia 76ers. Now Cincinnati had two strong title contenders to deal with in their own division. Philadelphia later defeated the Royals in the 1965 playoffs.

== Draft picks ==
Round	Pick	Player	Position	Nationality	School/Club team
2	15	Bill Chmielewski	United States		University of Dayton
2	9	Steve Courtin	United States		Saint Joseph's University
4	33	Happy Hairston	United States		New York University
5	42	George Kirk	United States		University of Memphis

== Roster ==
Cincinnati Royals roster
Players

Pos.	No.	Player	Height	Weight	DOB	From
G	21	Jay Arnette	6 ft 2 in (1.88 m)	175 lb (79 kg)		Texas
G	11	Arlen Bockhorn	6 ft 4 in (1.93 m)	200 lb (91 kg)		Dayton
C	15	Wayne Embry	6 ft 8 in (2.03 m)	240 lb (109 kg)		Miami (OH)
F	22	Happy Hairston	6 ft 7 in (2.01 m)	225 lb (102 kg)		NYU
F	20	Tom Hawkins	6 ft 5 in (1.96 m)	210 lb (95 kg)		Notre Dame
F/C	16	Jerry Lucas	6 ft 8 in (2.03 m)	230 lb (104 kg)		Ohio State
F	34	Bud Olsen	6 ft 8 in (2.03 m)	220 lb (100 kg)		Louisville
PG	14	Oscar Robertson	6 ft 5 in (1.96 m)	205 lb (93 kg)		Cincinnati
G	10	Adrian Smith	6 ft 1 in (1.85 m)	180 lb (82 kg)		Kentucky
G	25	Tom Thacker	6 ft 2 in (1.88 m)	170 lb (77 kg)		Cincinnati
F	27	Jack Twyman	6 ft 6 in (1.98 m)	210 lb (95 kg)		Cincinnati
C	17	George Wilson	6 ft 8 in (2.03 m)	225 lb (102 kg)		Cincinnati

Coaches
Head coach
- Jack McMahon

Legend
- (DP) Unsigned draft pick
- (FA) Free agent
- (S) Suspended
- Injured

== Regular season ==
=== Season standings ===
Eastern Division	W	L	PCT	GB	Home	Road	Neutral	Div
x-Boston Celtics	62	18	.775	–	27–3	27–11	8–4	20–10
x-Cincinnati Royals	48	32	.600	14	25–7	17–21	6–4	16–14
x-Philadelphia 76ers	40	40	.500	22	13–12	9–21	18–7	14–16
New York Knicks	31	49	.388	31	15–20	9–21	7–8	10–20

=== Game log ===
1964–65 game log
#	Date	Opponent	Score	High points	Record
1	October 17	@ St. Louis	91–94	Oscar Robertson (27)	0–1
2	October 18	San Francisco	108–117	Jack Twyman (31)	1–1
3	October 20	Los Angeles	113–121	Oscar Robertson (31)	2–1
4	October 25	Philadelphia	107–109	Jerry Lucas (32)	3–1
5	October 30	St. Louis	118–119	Oscar Robertson (39)	4–1
6	October 31	@ Boston	94–122	Oscar Robertson (24)	4–2
7	November 1	Detroit	101–114	Oscar Robertson (22)	5–2
8	November 6	Baltimore	111–106	Adrian Smith (26)	5–3
9	November 7	@ Philadelphia	103–105	Jerry Lucas (21)	5–4
10	November 8	Boston	106–103	Jerry Lucas (37)	5–5
11	November 11	@ St. Louis	118–116	Jerry Lucas (26)	6–5
12	November 13	St. Louis	106–123	Jerry Lucas (30)	7–5
13	November 14	@ New York	111–110	Oscar Robertson (27)	8–5
14	November 15	San Francisco	122–106	Oscar Robertson (22)	8–6
15	November 17	@ San Francisco	114–108	Oscar Robertson (33)	9–6
16	November 18	@ Los Angeles	92–90	Oscar Robertson (32)	10–6
17	November 20	@ Los Angeles	121–131	Oscar Robertson (32)	10–7
18	November 21	@ San Francisco	111–104	Jerry Lucas (29)	11–7
19	November 25	@ Baltimore	116–125	Oscar Robertson (40)	11–8
20	November 27	Philadelphia	112–133	Oscar Robertson (27)	12–8
21	November 28	@ Boston	98–129	Oscar Robertson (23)	12–9
22	November 29	New York	95–105	Robertson, Smith (20)	13–9
23	December 1	N Detroit	107–129	Oscar Robertson (25)	14–9
24	December 2	@ Detroit	115–125	Jerry Lucas (31)	14–10
25	December 4	Los Angeles	90–104	Oscar Robertson (33)	15–10
26	December 6	N Baltimore	124–113	Oscar Robertson (32)	16–10
27	December 9	@ Detroit	122–114	Oscar Robertson (32)	17–10
28	December 10	Boston	116–101	Oscar Robertson (31)	17–11
29	December 12	@ St. Louis	115–109	Oscar Robertson (22)	18–11
30	December 18	Los Angeles	107–111	Oscar Robertson (56)	19–11
31	December 19	@ New York	133–105	Oscar Robertson (30)	20–11
32	December 25	St. Louis	125–130 (OT)	Oscar Robertson (38)	21–11
33	December 26	@ Philadelphia	135–125	Oscar Robertson (38)	22–11
34	December 27	@ Baltimore	119–126	Oscar Robertson (48)	22–12
35	December 28	San Francisco	108–113	Oscar Robertson (35)	23–12
36	January 1	N Baltimore	140–124	Oscar Robertson (39)	24–12
37	January 3	Boston	89–85	Oscar Robertson (35)	24–13
38	January 5	@ New York	125–116 (OT)	Oscar Robertson (37)	25–13
39	January 6	New York	102–116	Oscar Robertson (28)	26–13
40	January 8	N Philadelphia	107–114	Oscar Robertson (26)	27–13
41	January 9	@ Baltimore	128–119	Oscar Robertson (42)	28–13
42	January 10	Detroit	114–140	Lucas, Twyman (24)	29–13
43	January 15	Los Angeles	106–124	Jerry Lucas (29)	30–13
44	January 17	@ Boston	98–101	Lucas, Robertson (23)	30–14
45	January 19	St. Louis	99–103	Oscar Robertson (40)	31–14
46	January 20	@ Detroit	102–90	Jack Twyman (21)	32–14
47	January 23	Detroit	105–102	Oscar Robertson (35)	32–15
48	January 24	San Francisco	103–124	Robertson, Twyman (24)	33–15
49	January 26	@ San Francisco	115–107	Adrian Smith (32)	34–15
50	January 27	@ Los Angeles	112–119	Oscar Robertson (34)	34–16
51	January 28	@ San Francisco	90–105	Jerry Lucas (27)	34–17
52	January 29	@ Los Angeles	133–137 (2OT)	Oscar Robertson (36)	34–18
53	January 31	@ Philadelphia	122–127	Oscar Robertson (35)	34–19
54	February 3	Los Angeles	99–130	Oscar Robertson (44)	35–19
55	February 5	@ Boston	113–114	Oscar Robertson (38)	35–20
56	February 6	N Philadelphia	127–122	Oscar Robertson (50)	35–21
57	February 9	Boston	121–134	Oscar Robertson (42)	36–21
58	February 10	N New York	115–112 (OT)	Oscar Robertson (37)	36–22
59	February 11	N Detroit	109–130	Oscar Robertson (28)	37–22
60	February 13	Philadelphia	106–108	Oscar Robertson (37)	38–22
61	February 14	@ St. Louis	99–92	Oscar Robertson (30)	39–22
62	February 16	St. Louis	103–111	Oscar Robertson (35)	40–22
63	February 17	@ Baltimore	114–125	Oscar Robertson (35)	40–23
64	February 21	@ New York	104–109	Oscar Robertson (40)	40–24
65	February 23	N Baltimore	127–131	Oscar Robertson (39)	40–25
66	February 27	@ Detroit	115–117	Oscar Robertson (35)	40–26
67	February 28	N New York	117–126	Adrian Smith (32)	41–26
68	March 1	N Detroit	130–110	Lucas, Robertson (20)	41–27
69	March 2	San Francisco	105–121	Oscar Robertson (28)	42–27
70	March 3	@ Baltimore	108–151	Lucas, Robertson (20)	42–28
71	March 5	Philadelphia	110–109	Oscar Robertson (36)	42–29
72	March 6	@ San Francisco	97–93	Robertson, Smith (26)	43–29
73	March 7	@ Los Angeles	104–106	Adrian Smith (25)	43–30
74	March 10	@ St. Louis	113–137	Jerry Lucas (25)	43–31
75	March 12	Boston	108–118	Oscar Robertson (37)	44–31
76	March 14	@ New York	113–103	Oscar Robertson (24)	45–31
77	March 16	New York	102–111	Lucas, Robertson (30)	46–31
78	March 18	Baltimore	110–113	Oscar Robertson (30)	47–31
79	March 20	@ Philadelphia	125–122	Jerry Lucas (34)	48–31
80	March 21	@ Boston	99–116	Jerry Lucas (26)	48–32

== Playoffs ==
1965 playoff game log
Division semifinals: 1–3 (home: 0–2; road: 1–1)

Game	Date	Team	Score	High points	High rebounds	High assists	Location Attendance	Series
1	March 24	Philadelphia	L 117–119 (OT)	Jack Twyman (25)	Jerry Lucas (27)	Oscar Robertson (13)	Cincinnati Gardens; 6,422	0–1
2	March 26	@ Philadelphia	W 121–120	Oscar Robertson (40)	Jerry Lucas (21)	Oscar Robertson (13)	Municipal Auditorium; 5,801	1–1
3	March 28	Philadelphia	L 94–108	Oscar Robertson (27)	Jerry Lucas (17)	Oscar Robertson (12)	Cincinnati Gardens; 6,289	1–2
4	March 31	@ Philadelphia	L 112–119	Jerry Lucas (35)	Jerry Lucas (19)	Oscar Robertson (10)	Municipal Auditorium; 7,451	1–3

1965 schedule

== Player statistics ==
=== Regular season ===
Player	GP	GS	MPG	FG%	3FG%	FT%	RPG	APG	SPG	BPG	PPG
Jay Arnette											
Arlen Bockhorn											
Wayne Embry											
Happy Hairston											
Tom Hawkins											
Jerry Lucas											
Bud Olsen											
Oscar Robertson											
Adrian Smith											
Tom Thacker											
Jack Twyman											
George Wilson											

=== Playoffs ===
Player	GP	GS	MPG	FG%	3FG%	FT%	RPG	APG	SPG	BPG	PPG
Jay Arnette											
Wayne Embry											
Happy Hairston											
Tom Hawkins											
Jerry Lucas											
Bud Olsen											
Oscar Robertson											
Adrian Smith											
Tom Thacker											
Jack Twyman											
George Wilson											

== Awards and honors ==
- Oscar Robertson, All-NBA First Team
- Jerry Lucas, All-NBA First Team
