= Gary Yoder =

American former basketball player (born 1955)

Personal information
- Born: July 4, 1955 (age 71) Topeka, Indiana, U.S.
- Listed height: 6 ft 4 in (1.93 m)
- Listed weight: 185 lb (84 kg)

Career information
- High school: Westview (LaGrange County, Indiana)
- College: Ole Miss (1973–1974); College of Southern Idaho (1974–1975); Cincinnati (1975–1977)
- NBA draft: 1977: 3rd round, 47th overall pick
- Drafted by: Milwaukee Bucks
- Position: Shooting guard

Career highlights
- Metro Conference Player of the Year (1977); First-team All-Metro Conference (1977); Metro tournament MVP (1977)
- Stats at Basketball Reference

Gary Yoder (born July 4, 1955) is an American former basketball player. He is best known for his collegiate career at the University of Cincinnati, although he played for three different colleges during his career.

== High school career ==
A standout four-year player at Westview High School in LaGrange County, Indiana, Yoder led the Warriors to the 1973 sectional championship and regional final against Fort Wayne Northrop High School. He scored school records of 683 points on the season and 51 points in a single game. He also broke the LaGrange County scoring record by accumulating 1,711 points in his career.

== College career ==
Yoder moved on to play at Ole Miss, where in his freshman season he averaged 4.7 points per game. Deciding to transfer, Yoder spent his sophomore season playing at Southern Idaho Community College in 1974–75, where he led the Golden Eagles to the national junior college championship against Western Texas College.

Yoder then transferred to Cincinnati where he played his final two seasons of college basketball. In two seasons as the Bearcats point guard, he led them to a combined 50–11 record, two conference titles and two NCAA tournament berths.

As a junior, he averaged 7.3 points per game and led the team in assists. During his senior season in 1976–77, Yoder was the Bearcats' second-leading scorer and again their assists leader. He also had a free throw percentage of .881, the second-highest in UC history. He was named the Metro Seven Conference Player of the Year, which was the award's inaugural year. He also earned honorable mention All-American honors in 1977.

He was inducted into the University of Cincinnati Athletic Hall of Fame in 1999.

He was selected in the third round (47th overall) of the 1977 NBA draft by the Milwaukee Bucks, but he did not play in the NBA.

== Personal life ==
In 1981, Yoder became assistant coach for the Fresno State University men's basketball team at the same time that his wife, Carol, coached the women's team.

Yoder went on to earn Certified Investment Management Analyst (CIMA) certification from the University of Pennsylvania Wharton School of Business. Since 1981 he has worked for Morgan Stanley Wealth Management, where he is currently Senior Vice President. He is also active in Rotary International in Fresno, California, for which he has earned the designation of Paul Harris Fellow, named for Rotary International's founder.

In 2005, Gary and Carol Yoder earned recognition in the Fresno State Honor Roll of Donors Centennial Society for contributions to the university.
