= Melvin Levett =

American basketball player and coach (born 1976)

Personal information
- Born: April 25, 1976 (age 50) Cleveland, Ohio, U.S.
- Listed height: 6 ft 3 in (1.91 m)
- Listed weight: 215 lb (98 kg)

Career information
- High school: Euclid (Euclid, Ohio)
- College: Cincinnati (1995–1999)
- NBA draft: 1999: 2nd round, 54th overall pick
- Drafted by: Detroit Pistons
- Playing career: 1999–2003
- Position: Shooting guard

Career history
- 1999–2000: Cincinnati Stuff
- 2000: Harlem Globetrotters
- 2000–2001: Saskatchewan Hawks
- 2001: Florida Sea Dragons
- 2001–2002: Kentucky Pro Cats
- 2002–2003: Szolnoki Olaj

Career highlights
- Fourth-team Parade All-American (1995)
- Stats at Basketball Reference

Melvin Levett (born April 25, 1976) is an American former basketball player and high school basketball coach for the Winton Woods High School Warriors. As a shooting guard he was drafted by the Detroit Pistons and then later traded to the Los Angeles Lakers organization, though he never appeared in a regular season NBA game. He played collegiately for Cincinnati. While in college, he set the University of Cincinnati single-game record for three-point field goals when he made 10 against Eastern Kentucky.

== Coaching career ==
=== Colerain High School (Ohio) ===
==== 2015–16 season ====
In 2015, Levett accepted the job as head basketball coach at Colerain High School in Cincinnati, Ohio. His first and only win came on January 8, 2016, over Sycamore High School. Nick Martini led scoring for the Cardinals with 17 points, and 3 rebounds. Despite ending the regular season 1–21, the Cardinals made it to the state playoffs (due to OHSAA rules), but then lost 77–47 in the sectional final to the Lancers of La Salle High School

=== Winton Woods High School (Ohio) ===
==== 2018–19 season ====
In 2018, a year after becoming a teacher at Winton Woods High School in Cincinnati, Levett became an assistant coach for the boys varsity basketball team. The Warriors would finish the 2019 season with a 14–7 record and an appearance in the OHSAA district championship game at the University of Dayton Arena, where they would lose to the Archbishop Moeller High School Crusaders, 57–15.
