= Bob Miller (basketball) =

American basketball player

Personal information
- Born: July 9, 1956 (age 70) Louisville, Kentucky, U.S.
- Listed height: 6 ft 10 in (2.08 m)
- Listed weight: 230 lb (104 kg)

Career information
- High school: Central (Louisville, Kentucky)
- College: Cincinnati (1974–1978)
- NBA draft: 1978: 4th round, 85th overall pick
- Drafted by: Phoenix Suns
- Position: Power forward
- Number: 41

Career history
- 1983–1984: Louisville Catbirds
- 1984: San Antonio Spurs
- 1984: Louisville Catbirds
- 1984–1985: Cincinnati Slammers

Career highlights
- CBA rebounding leader (1984); First-team All-Metro Conference (1977); Second-team All-Metro Conference (1978)
- Stats at NBA.com
- Stats at Basketball Reference

Robert Edwin Miller (born July 9, 1956) is an American former basketball player. He played college basketball for the Cincinnati Bearcats and professionally for the National Basketball Association's San Antonio Spurs.

Miller, a 6'10" power forward from Louisville, Kentucky, attended the University of Cincinnati from 1974 to 1978. Following his college career, he was selected by the Phoenix Suns in the fourth round of the 1978 NBA draft. He would not make his NBA debut until January 1984, when he appeared in two games for the San Antonio Spurs, recording four points and five rebounds in eight total minutes of action. Miller also played for two seasons in the Continental Basketball Association (CBA) for the Louisville Catbirds and Cincinnati Slammers. He averaged 9.5 points and 11.2 rebounds in 41 total CBA games.

== Career statistics ==
Legend
GP	Games played	GS	Games started	MPG	Minutes per game
FG%	Field goal percentage	3P%	3-point field goal percentage	FT%	Free throw percentage
RPG	Rebounds per game	APG	Assists per game	SPG	Steals per game
BPG	Blocks per game	PPG	Points per game	**Bold**	Career high

=== NBA ===
==== Regular season ====
Year	Team	GP	GS	MPG	FG%	3P%	FT%	RPG	APG	SPG	BPG	PPG
1983–84	San Antonio	2	0	4.0	.667	–	–	2.5	.5	.0	.5	2.0
