= 1963 NCAA Men's Basketball All-Americans =

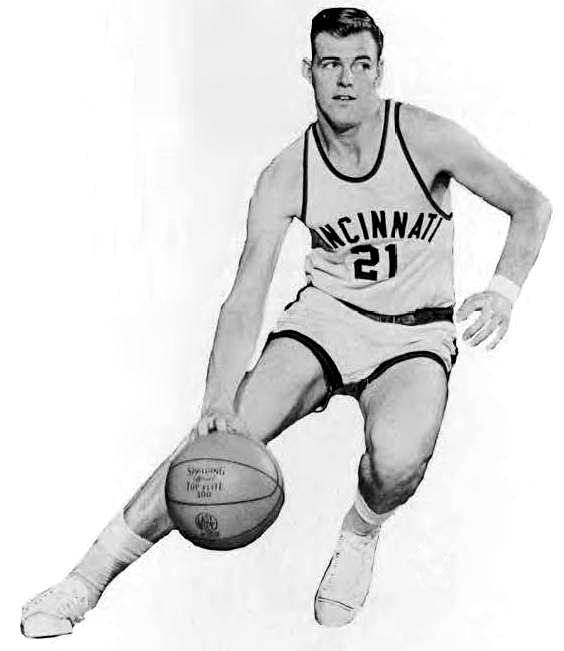
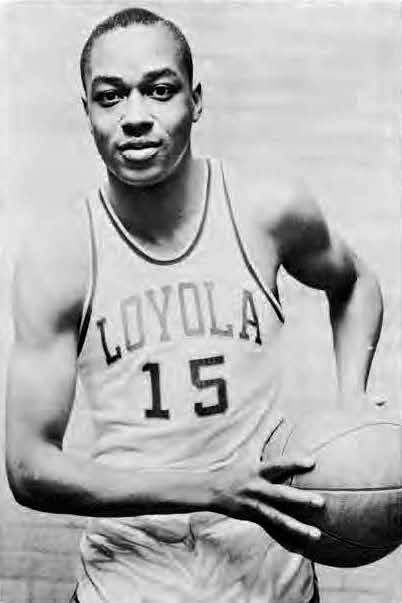
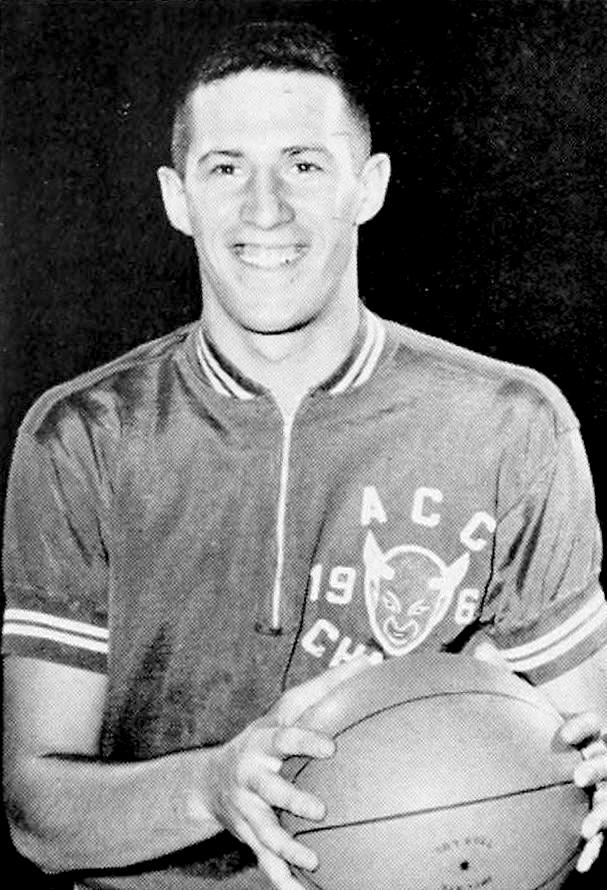
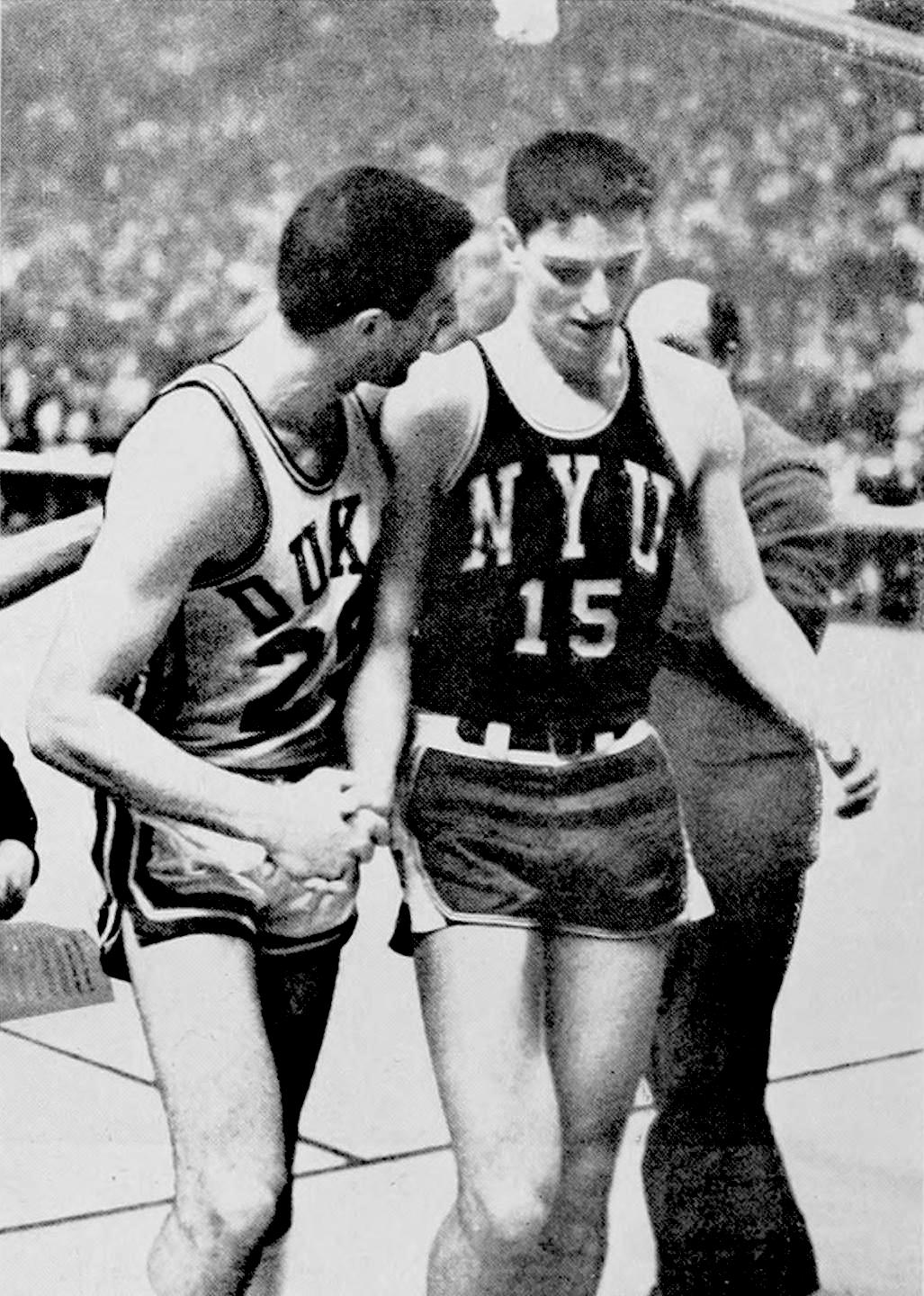
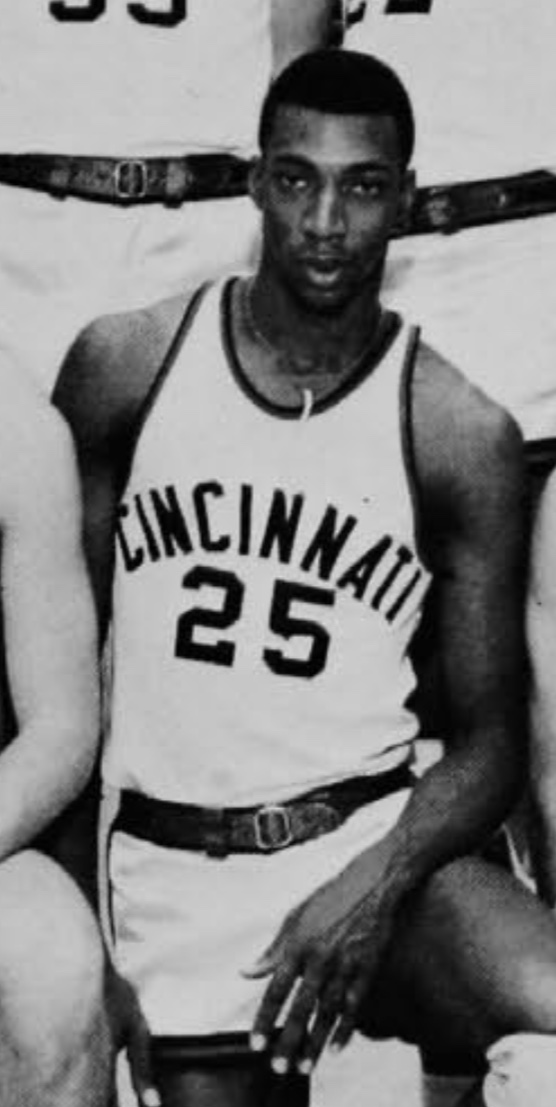
- The 1963 consensus first team. Clockwise from top left: Bonham, Harkness, Thacker, Kramer, Heyman.
- Awarded for: 1962–63 NCAA University Division men's basketball season

The consensus 1963 College Basketball All-American team as determined by aggregating the results of five major All-American teams. To earn "consensus" status, a player must win honors from a majority of the following teams: the Associated Press, the USBWA, The United Press International, the National Association of Basketball Coaches, and the Newspaper Enterprise Association (NEA). 1963 was the last year that the NEA was used to determine consensus All-American teams.

== 1963 Consensus All-America team ==
Consensus First Team
Player	Position	Class	Team
Ron Bonham	F	Junior	Cincinnati
Jerry Harkness	G	Senior	Loyola (IL)
Art Heyman	F	Senior	Duke
Barry Kramer	G/F	Junior	NYU
Tom Thacker	G	Senior	Cincinnati

Consensus Second Team
Player	Position	Class	Team
Gary Bradds	F	Junior	Ohio State
Bill Green	F	Senior	Colorado State
Cotton Nash	F	Junior	Kentucky
Rod Thorn	G/F	Senior	West Virginia
Nate Thurmond	C	Senior	Bowling Green

== Individual All-America teams ==
All-America Team
All-America Team	First team		Second team		Third team	
All-America Team	Player	School	Player	School	Player	School
Associated Press	Ron Bonham	Cincinnati	Bill Bradley	Princeton	Bill Green	Colorado State
Associated Press	Gary Bradds	Ohio State	Walt Hazzard	UCLA	Eddie Miles	Seattle
Associated Press	Jerry Harkness	Loyola (IL)	Cotton Nash	Kentucky	Jimmy Rayl	Indiana
Associated Press	Art Heyman	Duke	Tom Thacker	Cincinnati	Nick Werkman	Seton Hall
Associated Press	Barry Kramer	NYU	Rod Thorn	West Virginia	Tony Yates	Cincinnati
USBWA	Ron Bonham	Cincinnati	No second or third teams (10-man first team)			
USBWA	Ken Charlton	Colorado	No second or third teams (10-man first team)			
USBWA	Bill Green	Colorado State	No second or third teams (10-man first team)			
USBWA	Jerry Harkness	Loyola (IL)	No second or third teams (10-man first team)			
USBWA	Walt Hazzard	UCLA	No second or third teams (10-man first team)			
USBWA	Art Heyman	Duke	No second or third teams (10-man first team)			
USBWA	Barry Kramer	NYU	No second or third teams (10-man first team)			
USBWA	Cotton Nash	Kentucky	No second or third teams (10-man first team)			
USBWA	Tom Thacker	Cincinnati	No second or third teams (10-man first team)			
USBWA	Rod Thorn	West Virginia	No second or third teams (10-man first team)			
NABC	Ron Bonham	Cincinnati	Mel Counts	Oregon State	Gary Bradds	Ohio State
NABC	Bill Green	Colorado State	Walt Hazzard	UCLA	Bill Bradley	Princeton
NABC	Jerry Harkness	Loyola (IL)	Cotton Nash	Kentucky	Joe Caldwell	Arizona State
NABC	Art Heyman	Duke	Rod Thorn	West Virginia	Barry Kramer	NYU
NABC	Tom Thacker	Cincinnati	Nick Werkman	Seton Hall	Tony Yates	Cincinnati
UPI	Ron Bonham	Cincinnati	Bill Bradley	Princeton	Bill Green	Colorado State
UPI	Gary Bradds	Ohio State	Barry Kramer	NYU	Walt Hazzard	UCLA
UPI	Jerry Harkness	Loyola (IL)	Cotton Nash	Kentucky	Eddie Miles	Seattle
UPI	Art Heyman	Duke	Rod Thorn	West Virginia	Dave Stallworth	Wichita State
UPI	Tom Thacker	Cincinnati	Nate Thurmond	Bowling Green	Nick Werkman	Seton Hall
NEA	Bill Green	Colorado State	Ron Bonham	Cincinnati	No third team	
NEA	Art Heyman	Duke	Bill Bradley	Princeton	No third team	
NEA	Barry Kramer	NYU	Jerry Harkness	Loyola (IL)	No third team	
NEA	Tom Thacker	Cincinnati	Cotton Nash	Kentucky	No third team	
NEA	Nate Thurmond	Bowling Green	Eddie Miles	Seattle	No third team	

AP Honorable Mention:

- Terry Baker, Oregon State
- Rick Barry, Miami (Florida)
- Bill Buntin, Michigan
- Joe Caldwell, Arizona State
- Ken Charlton, Colorado
- Mel Counts, Oregon State
- Billy Cunningham, North Carolina
- Tom Dose, Stanford
- Dave Downey, Illinois
- Vinnie Ernst, Providence
- Mel Garland, Purdue
- Ira Harge, New Mexico
- Lyle Harger, Houston
- Mack Herndon, Bradley
- Fred Hetzel, Davidson
- Layton Johns, Auburn
- Gus Johnson, Idaho
- Jim Kerwin, Tulane
- Don Kessinger, Ole Miss
- Jeff Mullins, Duke
- Willie Murrell, Kansas State
- Flynn Robinson, Wyoming
- Paul Silas, Creighton
- Dave Stallworth, Wichita State
- Red Stroud, Mississippi State
- Nate Thurmond, Bowling Green
- George Wilson, Cincinnati

== Academic All-Americans ==
Academic All-American teams were selected for the first time in 1963.

First Team
Player	School	Class
Art Becker	Arizona State	Junior
Ken Charlton	Colorado	Senior
Raymond Flynn	Providence	Senior
Rod Thorn	West Virginia	Senior
Gerry Ward	Boston College	Senior

Second Team
Player	School	Class
Terry Baker	Oregon State	Senior
Jay Buckley	Duke	Junior
Don Clemetson	Stanford	Senior
Brian Generalovich	Pittsburgh	Junior
Joe Dan Gold	Mississippi State	Senior

== See also ==
- 1962–63 NCAA University Division men's basketball season
