= Ken Charlton (basketball) =

American basketball player (1941–2024)

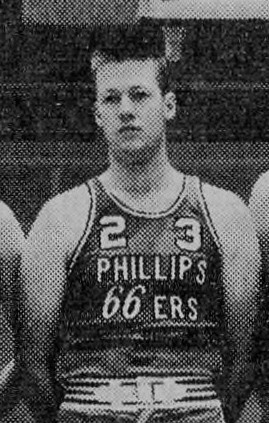
- Charlton, circa 1963

Personal information
- Born: March 20, 1941 Oklahoma City, Oklahoma, U.S.
- Died: July 17, 2024 (aged 83) St. Augustine, Florida, U.S.
- Listed height: 6 ft 6 in (1.98 m)
- Listed weight: 255 lb (116 kg)

Career information
- High school: South (Denver, Colorado)
- College: Colorado (1960–1963)
- NBA draft: 1963: 4th round, 31st overall pick
- Drafted by: Cincinnati Royals
- Position: Small forward
- Number: 23

Career highlights
- First-team All-American – USBWA (1963); First-team Academic All-American (1963); 2× First-team All-Big Eight (1962, 1963)
- Stats at Basketball Reference

Ken Charlton (March 20, 1941 – July 17, 2024) was an American basketball player. He is known best for his All-American college career at the University of Colorado.

Charlton, a 6'6" forward from Denver, Colorado, led Denver South High School to a state championship as a junior in 1958. He decided to attend the University of Colorado and starred for his three varsity seasons. In his junior and senior seasons, Charlton led the Buffs to back to back Regional Final appearances in the 1962 and 1963 NCAA Tournaments. Charlton led the team in scoring both seasons, and in 1963 he was named the Midwest Regional Most Outstanding player after scoring 49 points in two contests. In his senior year, Charlton was also named a first team All-American by the United States Basketball Writers Association and was a member of the first Academic All-American team ever named in basketball.

Charlton left Colorado with 1,352 points and graduated as the school's all-time leading scorer (since passed). He is a member of the University of Colorado's Athletic Hall of Fame and his #23 jersey has been honored by the school.

Following his graduation from Colorado, Charlton was drafted by the Cincinnati Royals in the fourth round of the 1963 NBA draft. He did not play in the NBA, but instead played for the Denver Chicago Truckers in the Amateur Athletic Union (AAU).

Charlton died from complications of Alzheimer's disease in St. Augustine, Florida, on July 17, 2024, at the age of 83.
