= Ron Bonham =

American basketball player (1942–2016)

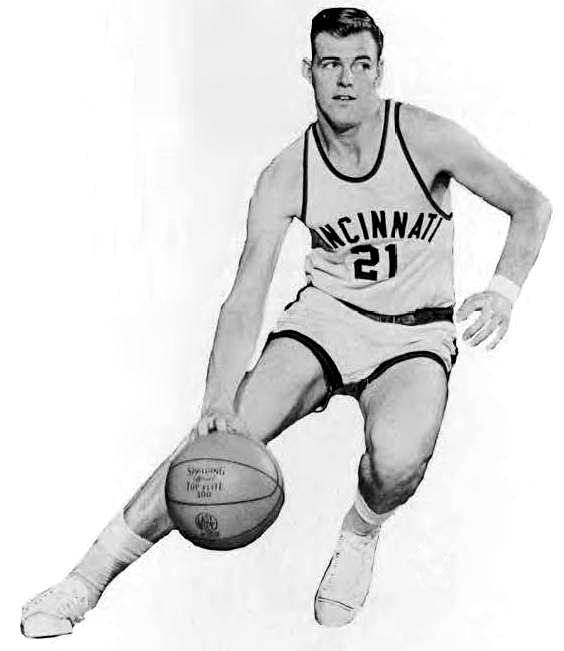
- Bonham in a 1963 NCAA tournament game program

Personal information
- Born: May 31, 1942 Muncie, Indiana, U.S.
- Died: April 16, 2016 (aged 73) Muncie, Indiana, U.S.
- Listed height: 6 ft 5 in (1.96 m)
- Listed weight: 192 lb (87 kg)

Career information
- High school: Muncie Central (Muncie, Indiana)
- College: Cincinnati (1961–1964)
- NBA draft: 1964: 2nd round, 16th overall pick
- Drafted by: Boston Celtics
- Playing career: 1964–1968
- Position: Small forward / shooting guard
- Number: 21, 30

Career history
- 1964–1966: Boston Celtics
- 1967–1968: Indiana Pacers

Career highlights
- 2× NBA champion (1965, 1966); NCAA champion (1962); Consensus first-team All-American (1963); Consensus second-team All-American (1964); 3× First-team All-MVC (1962–1964); First-team Parade All-American (1960); Indiana Mr. Basketball (1960)

Career NBA and ABA statistics
- Points: 723 (6.1 ppg)
- Rebounds: 170 (1.4 rpg)
- Assists: 44 (0.4 apg)
- Stats at NBA.com
- Stats at Basketball Reference

Ronald D. Bonham (May 31, 1942 – April 16, 2016) was an American professional basketball player. He won two NBA championships with the Boston Celtics and a college national title at the University of Cincinnati.

== Early life ==
Born May 31, 1942, in Muncie, he was the only child of Russell D. and Carmen I. (Neel) Bonham.

A 6-foot-5-inch (1.96 m) swingman, Bonham attended Muncie Central High School in Muncie, Indiana, where he earned the nickname "The Muncie Mortar" and "The Blond Bomber." As a senior, he averaged 28 points per game and earned Indiana's "Mr. Basketball" award as he led his team to the state runner-up spot. He was twice named first-team All-Indiana and was named MVP of both Indiana vs. Kentucky all-star games as a senior.

He graduated in 1960 as Muncie Central's all-time leading scorer with 2,023 points, which also made him the all-time scorer for the state of Indiana.

== College career ==
Bonham narrowed his college choices to Purdue University and the University of Cincinnati. He attended Purdue for three days, but realizing he would be required to enroll in ROTC for two years and would not be able to have a car on campus as a freshman, he returned home and then decided to attend his other choice, Cincinnati, due largely to the national success gained by the Bearcats during the recent Oscar Robertson era.

As a sophomore under coach Ed Jucker, Bonham averaged 14.3 points per game, led the Bearcats with a .760 free throw percentage and was named All-Missouri Valley Conference (MVC). The Bearcats won the MVC title and posted a 29–2 overall record. Led by Bonham, Tom Thacker, George Wilson, Tony Yates and Paul Hogue, on March 24, 1962, they won their second consecutive NCAA championship with a 71–59 win over Ohio State.

As a junior in 1962–63, Bonham led the Bearcats in scoring with 21.0 points per game and in free throw percentage at .892, again earning All-MVC honors. He was named a consensus first-team All-American selection. The Bearcats went 26–2 and again won the MVC, but on their way to a third national championship they were defeated in the finals by Loyola University Chicago in overtime, 60–58.

As a senior, he again led the Bearcats in scoring with a 24.4 average and a .819 free throw percentage and was co-team MVP with George Wilson. For the third straight season, he earned All-MVC honors and was named second-team All-American. Cincinnati ended the season 17–9.

In his three-year career, he scored 1,666 points, which was second only to Oscar Robertson and still ranks seventh all-time at Cincinnati.

== Professional career ==
Bonham was selected in the second round (16th overall) in the 1964 NBA draft by the Boston Celtics. As a rookie in 1964–65, he was a backup forward, played 10 minutes per game in 37 games and averaged 7.4 points and 2.1 rebounds per game. He did, however, win a championship ring as the Celtics went 62–18 and won the NBA title with a five-game series victory over the Los Angeles Lakers.

In 1965–66, his playing time decreased to eight minutes per game in 39 games as he averaged 5.2 and 0.9 rebounds per game for the 54–26 Celtics. The Celtics, however, won the NBA title again, this time in seven games over the Lakers.

His NBA career ended after those two seasons. He didn't play professionally in 1966–67, but in 1967–68 he returned to play in the American Basketball Association (ABA) for the Indiana Pacers. In 42 games, he averaged 5.8 points and 1.4 rebounds per game in what was his final season in the pros.

== Personal life ==
Bonham served as the City of Muncie assistant parks superintendent and chief caretaker of 2,300-acre Prairie Creek Park in Indiana for 38 years until 2011. For 12 years during that time, he served three terms as a Delaware County, Indiana, commissioner. On June 30, 2012, upon his retirement, the City of Muncie declared it "Ron Bonham Day" for all he has accomplished and meant to the area.

He and his wife, JJ, resided on a 52-acre property that doubles as a wildlife habitat in Delaware County. As of 2016 they had been married 43 years, and they had one daughter, Dr. Nicole Sims. Bonham died of liver cancer on April 16, 2016, at age 73.

In 1986, he was inducted into the University of Cincinnati Athletics Hall of Fame. In 1991, he was inducted into the Indiana Basketball Hall of Fame.

== Career statistics ==
Legend
GP	Games played	GS	Games started	MPG	Minutes per game
FG%	Field goal percentage	3P%	3-point field goal percentage	FT%	Free throw percentage
RPG	Rebounds per game	APG	Assists per game	SPG	Steals per game
BPG	Blocks per game	PPG	Points per game	**Bold**	Career high
†	Won an NBA championship

=== NBA/ABA ===
==== Regular season ====
Year	Team	GP	MPG	FG%	3P%	FT%	RPG	APG	PPG
1964–65†	Boston	37	10.0	**.414**		.821	**2.1**	**.5**	**7.4**
1965–66†	Boston	39	8.0	.367		**.852**	.9	.3	5.2
1967–68	Indiana (ABA)	**42**	**10.1**	.381	.000	.810	1.4	.3	5.8
Career (NBA)		76	9.0	.391		.832	1.5	.4	6.3
Career (overall)		118	9.4	.388	.000	.824	1.4	.4	6.1

==== Playoffs ====
Year	Team	GP	MPG	FG%	3P%	FT%	RPG	APG	PPG
1965†	Boston	4	3.3	.417		.800	.3	.0	3.5
1966†	Boston	**5**	3.2	**.636**		.333	.6	.0	3.4
1967–68	Indiana (ABA)	3	**10.0**	.267	–	**.833**	**2.0**	**1.0**	**4.3**
Career (NBA)		9	3.2	.522		.500	.4	.0	3.4
Career (overall)		12	4.9	.421	–	.600	.8	.3	3.7
