= Jim Ard =

American basketball player (born 1948)

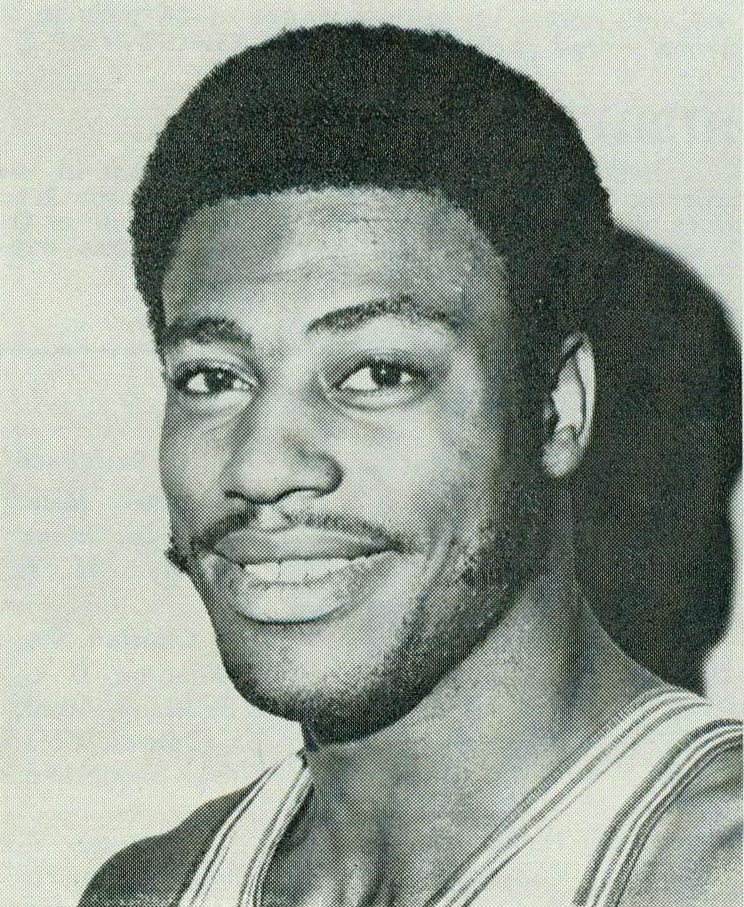
- Ard, c. 1970

Personal information
- Born: September 19, 1948 (age 78) Seattle, Washington, U.S.
- Listed height: 6 ft 9 in (2.06 m)
- Listed weight: 215 lb (98 kg)

Career information
- High school: Thornton Township (Harvey, Illinois)
- College: Cincinnati (1967–1970)
- NBA draft: 1970: 1st round, 6th overall pick
- Drafted by: Seattle SuperSonics
- Playing career: 1970–1978
- Position: Power forward / center
- Number: 12, 11, 33, 34

Career history
- 1970–1973: New York Nets
- 1973–1974: Memphis Tams
- 1974–1977: Boston Celtics
- 1977–1978: Chicago Bulls

Career highlights
- NBA champion (1976); MVC Player of the Year (1970); 3× First-team All-MVC (1968–1970)

Career statistics
- Points: 1,909 (4.4 ppg)
- Rebounds: 1,832 (4.3 rpg)
- Assists: 278 (0.6 apg)
- Stats at NBA.com
- Stats at Basketball Reference

Jimmie Lee Ard (born September 19, 1948) is an American former professional basketball player.

== Early life ==
Jim Ard was the son of James and Aline Ard. Jim attended Thornton Township High School in Harvey, Illinois. In his senior season of 1965–66, he was all-state and all-tournament in leading Thornton to the state title.

He was heavily recruited and offered scholarships by over 100 schools. He narrowed his choices down to the University of Wisconsin and the University of Cincinnati, which earlier in the decade had won back-to-back national championships. He selected Cincinnati.

== College career ==
A 6'8" forward/center, Ard attended Cincinnati and was a three-year starter for the Bearcats and was named first-team All-Missouri Valley Conference all three seasons. Ard was MVC MVP his senior season of 1969–70 when he averaged 19.2 points and 15.2 rebounds per game, and he was named Honorable Mention All-America by both the Associated Press and United Press International. He tied the school record for most blocked shots in one game (10), which he shares with Kenyon Martin, UC teammate Rick Roberson, and Eric Hicks. He still ranks seventh all-time in career rebounds.

In 1996, he was inducted into the University of Cincinnati Athletics Hall of Fame.

== Professional career ==
Ard was selected in the first round (sixth overall) of the 1970 NBA draft by the National Basketball Association's Seattle SuperSonics as well as by the New York Nets of the American Basketball Association. He signed with the Nets.

His three seasons with the Nets he served primarily as a backup forward/center, averaging about 14 minutes per game over those three seasons. In his rookie year of 1970–71, he averaged 5.8 points and 4.6 rebounds per game, followed in 1971–72 with 5.6 points and 5.2 rebounds. In 1972–73, his numbers slipped to 3.3 points and 3.5 rebounds.

He had a bit of a resurgence in 1973–74 with the ABA's Memphis Tams, averaging a career-high 6.4 points, 5.9 rebounds and 1.5 assists per game.

In the summer of 1974, he was signed by the NBA's Philadelphia 76ers, who released him a month later, but he then signed with the Boston Celtics. He is best known for his three years (1974–77) with the Celtics, for whom he provided rebounding and hustle as a backup to Dave Cowens, averaging about 13 minutes per game.

Ard sank the go-ahead free throws in game five of the 1976 NBA Finals, a triple-overtime affair between the Celtics and the Phoenix Suns. These free throws have been described as "the two most historic free throws in both Celtics and NBA history." The Celtics went on to win that series for the 1976 NBA championship and a ring for Jim Ard.

In 1977–78, after one game with the Celtics, he was waived by the Celtics and, one month later, signed with the Chicago Bulls. After 14 games with the Bulls he was released, and his eight-year professional career came to an end. In his career, he totaled 1,909 points and 1,832 rebounds.

== Personal life ==
After basketball he became a technical sales rep, first for Honeywell Corporation in the Phoenix area and later as a company award-winning rep for Amdahl for a decade in California, Florida and New Jersey. He served as sales manager and in executive sales positions for several other companies including Storage Technology Corporation in California, Andataco, Sun Microsystems, Marimba, Global Message Systems Corporation, Xiotech (now known as X-IO) and Sterling Commerce.

He currently resides in the Eugene, Oregon area.
