= Bud Olsen =

American basketball player (1940–2018)

Personal information
- Born: July 25, 1940 Hobart, Indiana, U.S.
- Died: March 12, 2018 (aged 77) Louisville, Kentucky, U.S.
- Listed height: 6 ft 8 in (2.03 m)
- Listed weight: 220 lb (100 kg)

Career information
- High school: Belmont (Dayton, Ohio)
- College: Louisville (1959–1962)
- NBA draft: 1962: 2nd round, 13th overall pick
- Drafted by: Cincinnati Royals
- Playing career: 1962–1970
- Position: Power forward / center
- Number: 16, 34, 13, 24, 29, 10

Career history
- 1962–1965: Cincinnati Royals
- 1965–1967: San Francisco Warriors
- 1967–1968: Seattle SuperSonics
- 1968: Boston Celtics
- 1968–1969: Detroit Pistons
- 1969–1970: Kentucky Colonels

Career NBA and ABA statistics
- Points: 1,935 (4.3 ppg)
- Rebounds: 1,485 (3.3 rpg)
- Assists: 542 (1.2 apg)
- Stats at NBA.com
- Stats at Basketball Reference

Enoch Eli "Bud" Olsen III (July 25, 1940 – March 12, 2018) was an American professional basketball player.

A 6'8" center from the University of Louisville, Olsen was selected by the Cincinnati Royals in the second round of the 1962 NBA draft. He played seven seasons in the NBA with the Royals, San Francisco Warriors, Seattle SuperSonics, Boston Celtics, and Detroit Pistons, averaging 4.3 points and 3.0 rebounds per game. He spent the 1969–70 season with the Kentucky Colonels of the American Basketball Association.

Olsen died on March 12, 2018.

== Career statistics ==
Legend
GP	Games played	GS	Games started	MPG	Minutes per game
FG%	Field goal percentage	3P%	3-point field goal percentage	FT%	Free throw percentage
RPG	Rebounds per game	APG	Assists per game	SPG	Steals per game
BPG	Blocks per game	PPG	Points per game	**Bold**	Career high
*	Led the league

=== NBA/ABA ===
==== Regular season ====
Year	Team	GP	MPG	FG%	3P%	FT%	RPG	APG	PPG
1962–63	Cincinnati	52	7.2	.323		.692	2.0	.8	2.2
1963–64	Cincinnati	49	10.5	.405		.561	3.0	.6	4.1
1964–65	Cincinnati	79	**17.4**	.438		**.738**	4.2	1.1	**7.5**
1965–66	Cincinnati	4	9.0	.375		.333	3.3	.5	1.8
1965–66	San Francisco	55	10.3	.422		.447	3.3	.3	3.5
1966–67	San Francisco	40	8.7	.449		.397	2.6	.8	4.3
1967–68	Seattle	73	12.3	.456		.274	2.8	1.0	3.8
1968–69	Boston	7	6.1	.368		.000	2.0	.6	2.0
1968–69	Detroit	10	7.0	.348		.333	1.1	.7	2.0
1969–70	Kentucky (ABA)	**84***	16.4	**.479**	.250	.356	**4.5**	**3.0**	4.1
Career (NBA)		369	11.4	.423		.553	3.0	.8	4.3
Career (overall)		453	12.3	.433	.250	.529	3.3	1.2	4.3

==== Playoffs ====
Year	Team	GP	MPG	FG%	3P%	FT%	RPG	APG	PPG
1963	Cincinnati	5	4.2	**.778**		.200	2.0	.6	3.0
1964	Cincinnati	2	5.0	.500		–	2.0	.5	3.0
1965	Cincinnati	4	9.8	.412		**.600**	2.3	.3	**4.3**
1967	San Francisco	4	3.5	.308		.000	2.3	.3	2.0
1970	Kentucky (ABA)	**12**	**17.6**	.419	.000	.143	**5.1**	**3.3**	3.1
Career (NBA)		15	5.6	.467		.333	2.1	.4	3.1
Career (overall)		27	10.9	.443	.000	.263	3.4	1.7	3.1
