= Tony Yates =

American basketball player and coach (1937–2020)

Biographical details
- Born: September 15, 1937; Lawrenceburg, Indiana, U.S.
- Died: May 16, 2020 (aged 82); Mason, Ohio, U.S.

Playing career
- 1960–1963: Cincinnati
- Position: Point guard

Coaching career (HC unless noted)
- 1972–1974: Cincinnati (assistant)
- 1974–1983: Illinois (assistant)
- 1983–1989: Cincinnati

Head coaching record
- Overall: 70–100 (.412)
- Tournaments: 1–1 (NIT)

Accomplishments and honors

Championships
- As player: 2× NCAA champion (1961, 1962)

Awards
- As player: Third-team All-American – AP, NABC (1963); First-team All-MVC (1963)

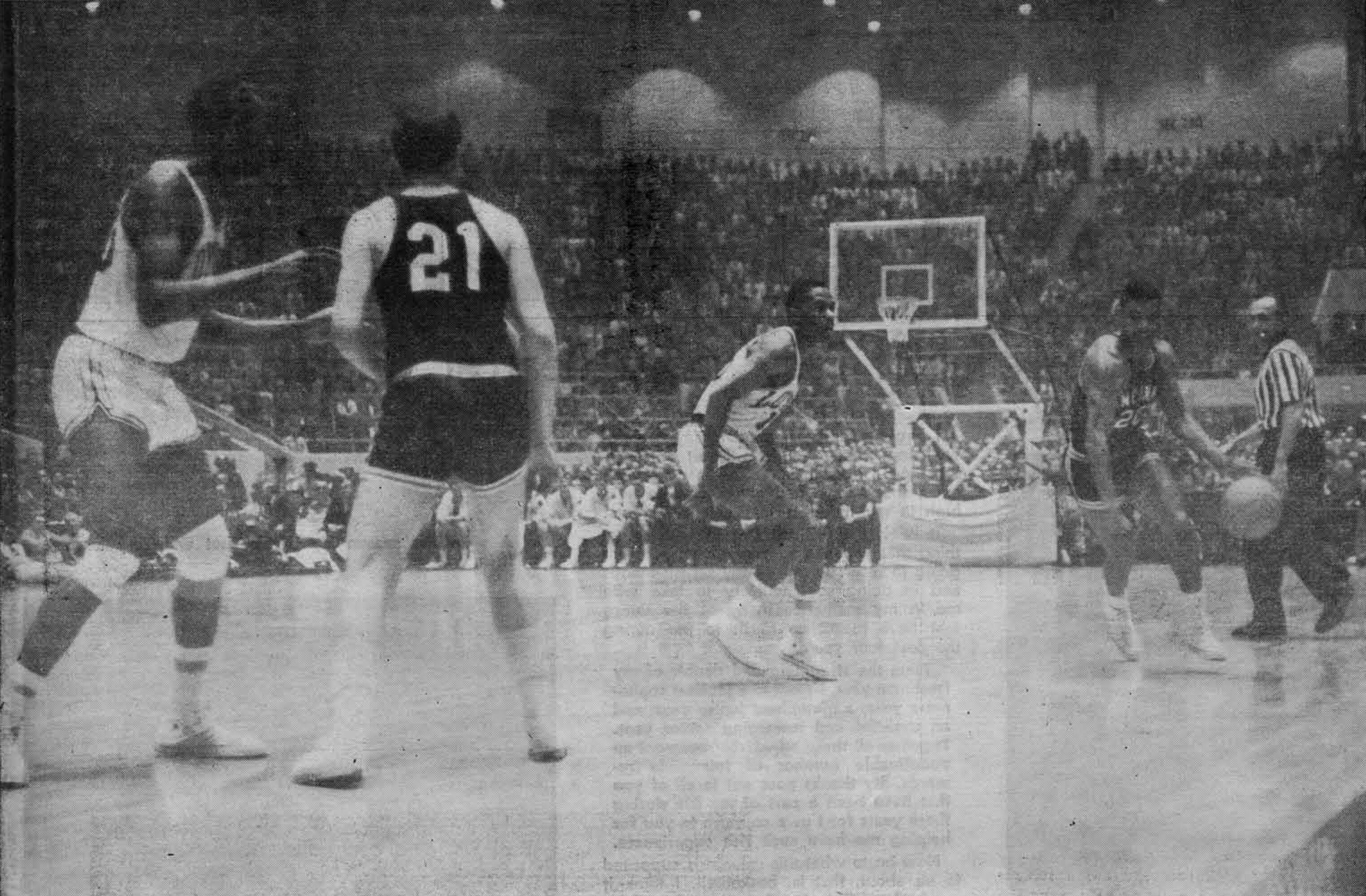
Tony Yates dribbles up court in this photo published by The News Record, the University of Cincinnati's student newspaper, on March 28, 1963.

Tony Yates (September 15, 1937 – May 16, 2020) was an American college basketball player and head coach for the Cincinnati Bearcats. As a player, he won consecutive national championships with Cincinnati in 1961 and 1962. Yates was named a third-team All-American in 1963, when the Bearcats advanced to the national championship game for the third straight season. In the 1980s he was the head coach at Cincinnati for six seasons.

== Early life ==
Yates was born in Lawrenceburg, Indiana, the son of Robert and Alice Ware Yates. He attended Lockland Wayne High School in nearby Cincinnati, leading the team to the Ohio high school basketball championship title in 1952, a team on which his brother, Fletcher, also starred. He graduated in 1954 at the age of 16. Because he was offered only partial scholarships to the University of Cincinnati and Xavier University, he worked for a year while playing on a barnstorming basketball team before joining the U.S. Air Force. He was stationed at Ellsworth Air Force Base, got married in 1958, and also continued to play basketball in the military, in which he served until 1959.

== College career ==
Yates decided to pursue college basketball again, even though he was now 22. This time he accepted a partial scholarship offer from Cincinnati, and he played on the freshman team in 1959–60. In his sophomore season of 1960–61, the now 23-year-old "Gramps", as he was nicknamed by players, was a starting guard for the Bearcats.

As a point guard, Yates was known for his outstanding floor leadership and defensive ability. In 1960–61, Yates averaged 7.4 points and 2.7 assists per game as the Bearcats went 27–3, won the Missouri Valley Conference (MVC), and advanced to the NCAA championship game. Cincinnati defeated Ohio State 70–65 to claim the national crown.

As a junior in 1961–62, Yates averaged 8.2 points per game and led the Bearcats in assists with 4.3 per game. The Bearcats posted a 29–2 record, again won the MVC and again advanced to the 1962 national championship game. Cincinnati again faced Ohio State, and again the Bearcats bested the Buckeyes, 71–59, to capture their second consecutive national title. Yates earned second-team All-American honors from the Helms Foundation and was named honorable mention All-American by United Press International (UPI).

As a senior in 1962–63, Yates averaged 7.6 points and 4.1 assists per game. The Bearcats won the MVC title once again and posted a 26–2 record, advancing to the national title game for the third consecutive year. However, they fell in the finals 60–58 in overtime to Loyola University Chicago. Yates was again named All-MVC as well as first team All-American by the Helms Foundation, third-team All-American by the Associated Press (AP) and National Association of Basketball Coaches along with honorable mention by UPI and The Sporting News.

In tribute to Yates' defensive prowess, he was a three-year winner of the Bearcats' Best Defensive Player award for his efforts in helping UC finish fourth and first, respectively in the 1962 and 1963 NCAA national defensive rankings.

Yates was drafted in the fifth round (41st overall) of the 1963 NBA draft by the St. Louis Hawks.

== Coaching career ==
He returned to the University of Cincinnati as an assistant coach under Tay Baker and Gale Catlett from 1972 to 1974. In 1974–75, Yates became an assistant coach at the University of Illinois on the staff of coach Gene Bartow, and the following season under new coach Lou Henson. The team posted mediocre records in Henson's first three seasons, but the Illini won 19 or more games the next five seasons with Yates serving as top assistant, and the team made two NCAA tournament appearances and two NIT appearances.

Known as a top recruiter, Yates served as an Illinois assistant for nine seasons, through the 1982–83 season.

For the 1983–84 season, Yates was named head coach at his alma mater, the University of Cincinnati, for a squad which had gone 11–17 the previous season under coach Ed Badger. Inheriting a depleted team with few scholarship players, the Bearcats posted a 3–25 record in Yates' first season of 1983–84. However, in 1984–85, with an infusion of talent including guard Roger McClendon and forward Myron Hughes, Yates' team rapidly turned around their fortunes and posted a 17–14 record, earning an NIT berth.

In 1985–86, the team struggled again, going 12–16, followed by seasons of 12–16, 12–16, and 11–17. In 1988–89, Yates' sixth as head coach, the team returned to its winning ways, posting a 15–12 record. However, it wasn't enough as Yates was fired and later replaced by Bob Huggins. Yates' UC career ended with a record of 70–100.

== Head coaching record ==
Record table
Season	Team	Overall	Conference	Standing	Postseason
Cincinnati Bearcats (Metro Conference) (1983–1989)
1983–84	Cincinnati	3–25	0–14	8th	
1984–85	Cincinnati	17–14	8–6	3rd	NIT Second Round
1985–86	Cincinnati	12–16	5–7	5th	
1986–87	Cincinnati	12–16	3–9	7th	
1987–88	Cincinnati	11–17	3–9	7th	
1988–89	Cincinnati	15–12	5–7	5th	
Cincinnati:		70–100 (.412)	24–52 (.316)		
Total:		70–100 (.412)			

== Personal life ==
Yates and his wife, Maxine, were the parents of Anthony and Brianna.

After coaching at Cincinnati, Yates, who had been a passive investor in a Cincinnati area automobile dealership owned by longtime UC booster Jeff Wyler, took an active management role with the firm.

Yates and golf pro Zachary Fink founded the Caring for Kids Foundation, a Cincinnati non-profit to "uplift, assist, and train youth and their families."

Yates is a member of Alpha Phi Alpha fraternity. In 1985, Yates was inducted into the University of Cincinnati Athletics Hall of Fame. Yates was inducted in the 2020 class of the Ohio Basketball Hall of Fame.

Yates died on May 16, 2020.
