= George Wilson (basketball, born 1942) =

American basketball player (1942–2023)

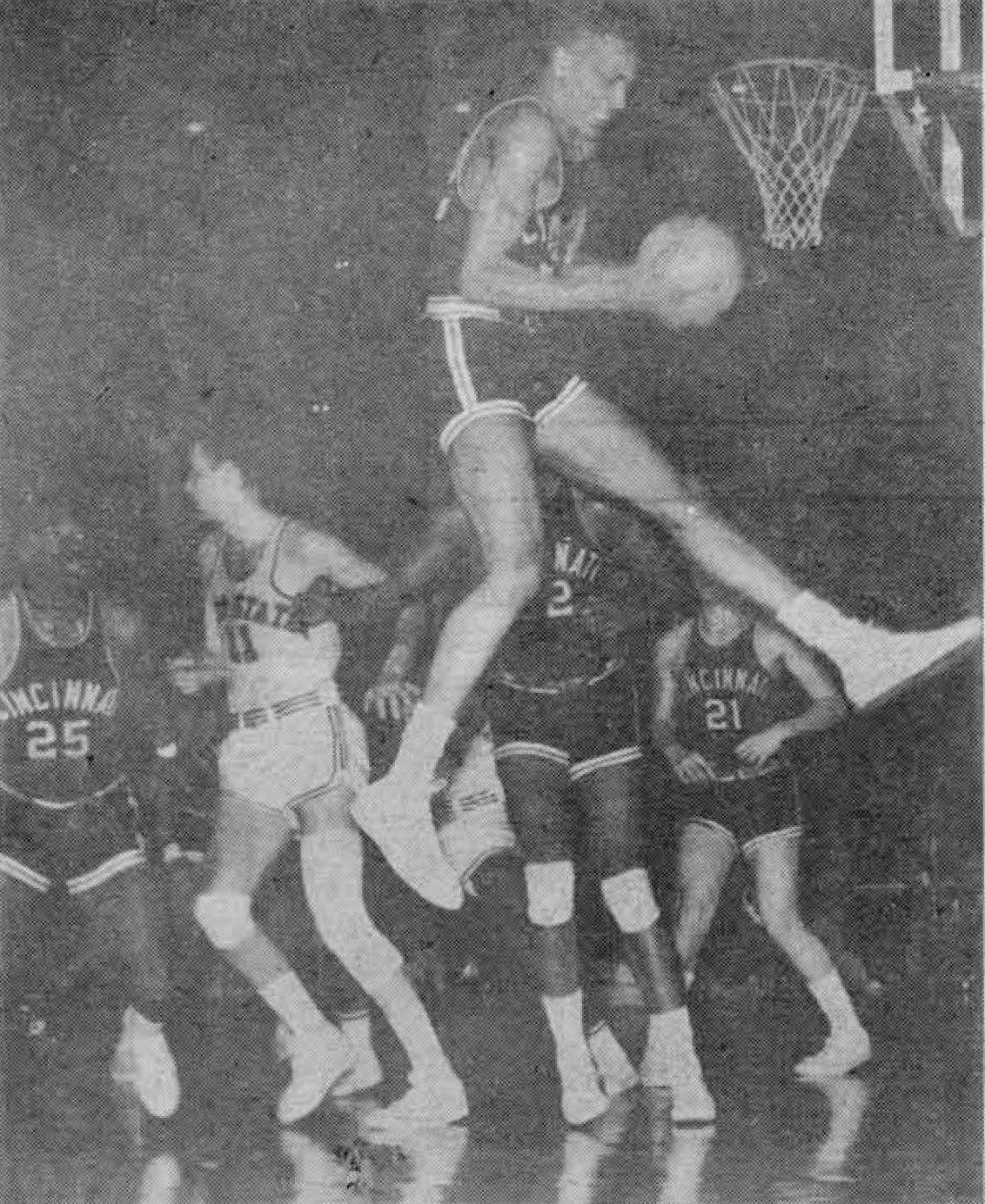
- Wilson rebounds in the 1962 NCAA championship game

Personal information
- Born: May 9, 1942 Meridian, Mississippi, U.S.
- Died: July 29, 2023 (aged 81) Cincinnati, Ohio, U.S.
- Listed height: 6 ft 8 in (2.03 m)
- Listed weight: 225 lb (102 kg)

Career information
- High school: John Marshall (Chicago, Illinois)
- College: Cincinnati (1961–1964)
- NBA draft: 1964: territorial pick
- Drafted by: Cincinnati Royals
- Playing career: 1964–1971
- Position: Center
- Number: 17, 15, 21, 16, 33

Career history
- 1964–1966: Cincinnati Royals
- 1966–1967: Chicago Bulls
- 1967–1968: Seattle SuperSonics
- 1968–1969: Phoenix Suns
- 1969–1970: Philadelphia 76ers
- 1970–1971: Buffalo Braves

Career highlights
- NCAA champion (1962); 2× First-team All-MVC (1963, 1964); First-team Parade All-American (1960); Third-team Parade All-American (1959)

Career statistics
- Points: 2,216 (5.4 ppg)
- Rebounds: 2,144 (5.2 rpg)
- Assists: 307 (0.7 apg)
- Stats at NBA.com
- Stats at Basketball Reference
Medals
Men's basketball
Representing the United States
Olympic Games
Gold medal – first place	1964 Tokyo	Team competition

George Wilson (May 9, 1942 – July 29, 2023) was an American professional basketball player. Wilson played as a center for the Cincinnati Royals, Chicago Bulls, Seattle SuperSonics, Phoenix Suns, Philadelphia 76ers, and Buffalo Braves of the National Basketball Association (NBA) from 1964 to 1971. Before turning professional, he played college basketball for the Cincinnati Bearcats and won a gold medal in the 1964 Summer Olympics.

== Early life ==
Wilson was born in Meridian, Mississippi, on May 9, 1942, and grew up on the west side of Chicago. He attended Marshall High School and led the Commandos basketball team as a center to four straight appearances in the Chicago Public League, winning the Illinois state championships in 1958 and 1960.

As a senior, he was named a high school All-American after three seasons of averaging 25, 27, and 26 points per game, and in 1960 he was the inaugural winner of the Chicago Sun-Times Player of the Year award. Wilson was named All-State three years. He was named to the Parade All-America Boys Basketball Team's third team in 1959 and the first team in 1960.

== College career ==
Recruited by many colleges, he chose to attend the University of Cincinnati primarily because of his admiration of Bearcats star Oscar Robertson. As a sophomore in his first year on the varsity in 1961–62, he broke into the starting lineup for Ed Jucker's Bearcats in the 14th game, and for the season he averaged 9.2 points per game. The Bearcats were co-champions of the Missouri Valley Conference (MVC) and posted a record of 29–2, capping off the season by winning the NCAA championship game over Ohio State 71–59, the Bearcats' second consecutive national title.

As a junior in 1962–63, Wilson led the Bearcats with 11.2 rebounds per game, a .505 field goal percentage and 1.4 blocked shots to go with 15.0 points per game. He was named All-MVC, and he was named second-team All-American by The Sporting News and Converse. The Bearcats went 26–2, again won the MVC and advanced to the NCAA championship game for the third consecutive season, but they were beaten by Loyola University Chicago in overtime, 60–58.

In his senior season of 1963–64, Wilson (who was team co-captain with Ron Bonham) again led the Bearcats in rebounding with 12.5 per game, field goal percentage at .535 and blocked shots with 1.7 per game. He set a new Bearcats record with eight blocked shots in a game against Dayton. He also scored 16.1 points per game as he was again named All-MVC. The Bearcats finished the season 17–9.

== 1964 Olympics ==
Wilson was a member of the 1964 U.S. Olympic basketball team, which went undefeated and won the gold medal.

== NBA career ==
The Cincinnati Royals selected Wilson with their territorial selection in the 1964 NBA draft. In November 1966, the Royals traded Wilson to the Chicago Bulls for Len Chappell. He played as a backup for the Bulls, focusing on defense and rebounding.

The Seattle SuperSonics acquired Wilson from the Bulls in the 1967 NBA expansion draft. He played as a reserve forward for the inaugural SuperSonics and averaged 6.1 points per game. The following year, the Phoenix Suns acquired Wilson from the SuperSonics in the 1968 NBA expansion draft.

Playing for the Suns, Wilson saw the most playing time of his professional career and averaged 11.6 points per game and 12.3 rebounds per game with them. However, in January 1969, the Suns traded Wilson to the Philadelphia 76ers for Jerry Chambers. He played for the 76ers as a reserve while Lucious Jackson was injured. The Buffalo Braves selected Wilson from the 76ers in the 1970 NBA expansion draft. He retired from the NBA in 1971.

== Personal life ==
Wilson graduated from the University of Cincinnati in 1964 with a degree in education. He was also a member of the Beta Eta chapter of Kappa Alpha Psi fraternity.

In 2006 Wilson was voted as one of the 100 Legends of the IHSA Boys Basketball Tournament, a group of former players and coaches in honor of the 100th anniversary of the IHSA boys basketball tournament. In 2010 Wilson was inducted into the Ohio Basketball Hall of Fame.

Wilson worked as a YMCA director and lived in Fairfield, Ohio. He competed in the Senior Olympics in golf, basketball, and horseshoes.

Wilson died on July 29, 2023, at age 81.

== Career statistics ==
Legend
GP	Games played	GS	Games started	MPG	Minutes per game
FG%	Field goal percentage	3P%	3-point field goal percentage	FT%	Free throw percentage
RPG	Rebounds per game	APG	Assists per game	SPG	Steals per game
BPG	Blocks per game	PPG	Points per game	**Bold**	Career high

=== NBA ===
==== Regular season ====
Year	Team	GP	MPG	FG%	FT%	RPG	APG	PPG
1964–65	Cincinnati	39	7.4	.265	.300	2.6	.3	2.3
1965–66	Cincinnati	47	5.9	.391	.643	2.1	.4	2.9
1966–67	Cincinnati	12	10.4	.195	**.813**	3.6	.0	2.4
1966–67	Chicago	43	10.4	.399	.643	3.8	.3	4.6
1967–68	Seattle	**77**	16.1	.359	.703	6.1	.7	6.1
1968–69	Phoenix	41	**31.6**	.397	.616	**12.3**	**1.9**	**11.6**
1968–69	Philadelphia	38	14.5	**.445**	.714	5.7	.8	5.8
1969–70	Philadelphia	67	12.5	.388	.709	4.7	.8	5.3
1970–71	Buffalo	46	15.5	.342	.812	5.0	1.0	5.2
Career		410	14.1	.372	.677	5.2	.7	5.4

==== Playoffs ====
Year	Team	GP	MPG	FG%	FT%	RPG	APG	PPG
1965	Cincinnati	2	1.5	**1.000**	–	1.0	.5	1.0
1966	L.A. Lakers	1	3.0	**1.000**	–	1.0	.0	2.0
1967	Chicago	2	**13.5**	.222	.500	4.5	.0	3.5
1969	Philadelphia	**5**	9.0	.000	.750	3.6	**1.6**	.6
1970	Philadelphia	2	11.5	.308	**1.000**	**6.0**	.5	**4.5**
Career		12	8.4	.258	.636	3.5	.8	1.9
