= NCAA Men's Basketball All-Americans =

Top performers in college basketball chosen by the media

The NCAA Men's Basketball All-American teams are teams made up of National Collegiate Athletic Association (NCAA) basketball players voted the best in the country by a variety of organizations.

== History ==
All-America teams in college basketball were first named by both College Humor magazine and the Christy Walsh Syndicate in 1929. In 1932, the Converse shoe company began publishing All-America teams in their yearly "Converse Basketball Yearbook," and continued doing so until they ceased publication of the yearbook in 1983. The Helms Athletic Foundation, created in 1936, retroactively named All-America teams for years 1905 to 1935, and also continued naming teams until 1983. The Associated Press began naming its team selections in 1948.

== Consensus teams ==
While an increasing number of media outlets select All-America teams, the NCAA recognizes consensus All-America teams back to 1905. These teams have drawn from two to six major media sources over the years, and are intended to reflect the opinions of most college basketball experts. Today the four outlets used to select consensus teams are the Associated Press, the National Association of Basketball Coaches, the United States Basketball Writers Association and Sporting News magazine. Since 1984, the NCAA has applied a standardized point system to those teams designated as "major" All-American teams to determine consensus teams. The point system consists of three points for first team, two points for second team and one point for third team. No honorable mention or fourth team or lower are used in the computation. The top five totals plus ties are first team and the next five plus ties are second team.

=== Teams used to determine consensus selections ===
Through the years, the following media outlets have been recognized and have been used to determine consensus teams. From 1905 to 1928, the Helms Athletic Foundation All-America teams are considered the "official" teams of those years by the NCAA.

Granting Institution	Years
Helms Athletic Foundation	1929–1948
College Humor	1929–1933; 1936
Christy Walsh Syndicate	1929–1930
Converse Yearbook	1932–1948
The Literary Digest	1934
Madison Square Garden	1937
Omaha World	1937–1942
Newspaper Enterprise Association (NEA)	1938; 1953–1963
Collyer's News Bureau	1939
Pic	1942–1944
Sporting News	1943–1946; 1960–1962; 1998–present
Argosy	1945
True	1946–1947
Associated Press (AP)	1948–present
United Press International (UPI)	1949–1996
Look	1949–1962
Collier's	1949–1956
International News Service	1950–1958
National Association of Basketball Coaches (NABC)	1957–present
National Collegiate Association Bureau	1961
U.S. Basketball Writers Association (USBWA)	1963–present

=== Leaders by school ===
The top ten schools with the most consensus first-team All-Americans are listed below, ranked by total number of selections. For a complete list, please see the NCAA records.

School	Selections	Players	Most recent year	Most recent player
Kansas	32	25	2023	Jalen Wilson
Purdue	30	20	2026	Braden Smith
North Carolina	28	19	2024	R. J. Davis
Kentucky	27	22	2022	Oscar Tshiebwe
Duke	26	23	2026	Cameron Boozer
Penn	24	14	1953	Ernie Beck
Notre Dame	23	14	2015	Jerian Grant
Wisconsin	22	19	2022	Johnny Davis
UCLA	21	15	2017	Lonzo Ball
Columbia	19	13	1957	Chet Forte

Updated through the 2025–26 season.

== Academic All-Americans ==
In 1963, the first Academic All-American basketball team was named. The first team, selected by the College Sports Information Directors of America (CoSIDA), consisted of: Rod Thorn of West Virginia, Ken Charlton of Colorado, Gerry Ward of Boston College, Art Becker of Arizona State and Ray Flynn of Providence. CoSIDA has named Academic All-America teams continuously each year since. For a complete list of first-team Academic All-Americans, please see the official NCAA records.

School	Selections	Players
UCLA	17	10
Kansas	15	11
Indiana	13	9
Duke	13	8
Notre Dame	13	8
North Carolina	11	9
Kentucky	9	8
Gonzaga	8	7
BYU	8	4
Northwestern	7	5
Purdue	7	5

Updated through the 2025–26 season.

== Preseason All-Americans ==
In 1986, the Associated Press named the first preseason All-America team for the 1986–87 NCAA Division I men's basketball season. Navy's David Robinson was the leading vote-getter that year. He was joined on the team by Steve Alford of Indiana, Danny Manning of Kansas, Kenny Smith of North Carolina and Pervis Ellison of Louisville. In 2011, Harrison Barnes of North Carolina became the first freshman voted a preseason All-American by the AP.

== See also ==
- NCAA Women's Basketball All-Americans – NCAA Division I women's basketball equivalent
- AAU Men's Basketball All-Americans – similar honor presented to men's basketball players in the Amateur Athletic Union between 1920–21 and 1967–68
