= 1951–52 Michigan Wolverines men's basketball team =

American college basketball season

1951–52 Michigan Wolverines men's basketball
- Conference: Big Ten Conference
- Record: 7–15 (4–10 Big Ten)
- Head coach: Ernie McCoy
- MVP: Jim Skala
- Captain: Jim Skala
- Home arena: Yost Field House

1951–52 Big Ten Conference men's basketball standings
	Conf.				Overall
Team	W		L	PCT	W		L	PCT
No. 2 Illinois	12	–	2	.857	22	–	4	.846
No. 7 Iowa	11	–	3	.786	19	–	3	.864
Minnesota	10	–	4	.714	15	–	7	.682
Indiana	9	–	5	.643	16	–	6	.727
Michigan State	6	–	8	.429	13	–	9	.591
Ohio State	6	–	8	.429	8	–	14	.364
Wisconsin	5	–	9	.357	10	–	12	.455
Michigan	4	–	10	.286	7	–	15	.318
Northwestern	4	–	10	.286	7	–	15	.318
Purdue	3	–	11	.214	8	–	14	.364
Rankings from AP Poll

The 1951–52 Michigan Wolverines men's basketball team represented the University of Michigan in intercollegiate basketball during the 1951–52 season. In their fourth season under head coach Ernie McCoy, the Wolverines team compiled a 7–15 record and finished in a tie for eighth place in the Big Ten Conference. Senior Jim Skala was the team captain, leading scorer and Most Valuable Player. The team was notable as the first racially integrated Michigan basketball team with Don Eaddy and John Codwell becoming the first two African-American players.

== Season overview ==
Team portrait of the 1951–52 Wolverines Top Row (l to r): Trainer Jim Hunt, Carl Brunsting, John Codwell, Bob Topp, Phillip Webb Front row (l to r): Ray Pavichevich, Milt Mead, Jim Skala, head coach Ernie McCoy, Jack Levitt, Doug Lawrence

The 1951–52 team finished the season in a tie for eighth place in the Big Ten Conference with an overall record of 7–15 and 4–10 against conference opponents. Ernie McCoy was in his fourth and final year as the team's head coach.

The 1951–52 team was inexperienced with only one senior, Jim Skala, on the squad. The team narrowly averted a last place finish with a victory over Purdue in the final game of the season. The Wolverines' total of 787 points was the lowest in the Big Ten. The team also recorded the lowest field goal percentage (28.4%) and free throw percentage (59.2%) in the conference.

Jim Skala was both the team captain and the team's leading scorer. He totaled 258 points in 22 games (169 points in conference games) for an average of 11.7 points per game. At the end of the season, Skala was voted by his teammates as the team's Most Valuable Player. Skala later served as the head basketball coach at Eastern Michigan University (1954–1960) before returning to Michigan as an assistant basketball coach under Dave Strack from 1960 to 1966.

The team's second leading scorer was Milt Mead, a six-foot, seven-inch sophomore from Bay City, Michigan. Mead scored 238 points (10.8 points per game) over the course of the 1951–52 season. Mead also won the 1953 NCAA championship in the high jump.

The 1951–52 season was Michigan's second consecutive year at or near the bottom of the Big Ten basketball standings. In June 1952, McCoy resigned as Michigan's head basketball coach to accept a position as the athletic directors at Penn State. In July 1952, athletic director Fritz Crisler announced the hiring of 40-year-old William Perigo, previously the head coach at Western Michigan, as Michigan's new head basketball coach.

== Racial integration ==
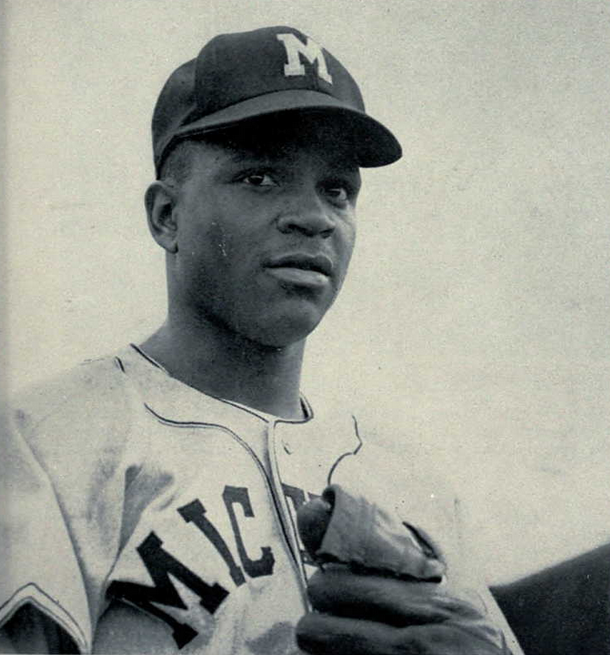
Don Eaddy appeared in all 22 games and was the team's third leading scorer.

The 1951–52 team was notable as the first Michigan men's basketball team to be racially integrated. During the 1950–51 season, the Indiana Hoosiers became the first Big Ten basketball team to integrate with the addition of center Bill Garrett. On January 9, 1951, Garrett became the first African-American to play at Yost Field House where he was "warmly applauded" by the fans. In a letter to The Michigan Daily, members of the Inter-Racial Association protested the lack of integration at Michigan. The letter said in part:

"Garrett is the first Negro to break the color line which exists in all Big Ten sports except football and track. ... Year after year Michigan has had top Negro football and track stars. ... Why has the University NEVER had a Negro on the basketball team? Why does this policy persist throughout the Big Ten? The answers are obvious. There is a deliberate and conscious policy of discrimination against Negro athletes. Or perhaps you will tell us where we err, Mr. Crisler?"

Michigan coach Ernie McCoy responded by denying the accusation of discrimination. McCoy noted that, in the prior 10 years, only one African-American, football star Len Ford, had tried out for the basketball team. McCoy opined that Ford could have been a good basketball player, but noted that his obligations to the football team kept him from reporting on time and added that Ford had developed bad habits playing unorganized ball which he did not have time to erase in practice.

On December 1, 1951, less than a year after the published criticism from Inter-Racial Association, Don Eaddy and John Codwell became the first African-American basketball players at Michigan. In the opening game of the 1951–52 season, Eaddy "hit four long shots" for eight points against Central Michigan University, the first points scored by an African-American basketball player at Michigan. Codwell also played in the opening game of the season and scored one point on a free throw.

Eaddy appeared in all 22 games for the Wolverines during the 1951–52 season and was the team's third leading scorer with 188 points. He went on to score over 1,000 points in four years for the Wolverines. He later played professional baseball for the Chicago Cubs.

Codwell was reportedly able to slam dunk the basketball with ease, and although he saw limited action in the 1951–52 season, he became one of the team's leading scorers with an average of 10.5 points per game during the 1952–53 season. Although he was able to break the race barrier on the basketball court, Codwell was barred from speaking at the Detroit alumni group's annual meeting at the University Club after the group found out he was African-American. One member sought to justify the decision: "It's not a question of being barred. It's just that the Club has never had any Negroes there before."

== Season in detail ==
=== Schedule ===
**Date**	**Opponent**	**Score**	**Result**	**Location**
December 1, 1951	Central Michigan	43–60	Loss	Cent. Mich. Field House; Mt. Pleasant, MI
December 17, 1951	Butler	53–63	Loss	Yost Field House; Ann Arbor, MI
December 20, 1951	Pennsylvania	63–68	Loss	Yost Field House; Ann Arbor, MI
December 24, 1951	Colorado	58–55	Win	Yost Field House; Ann Arbor, MI
December 27, 1951	Penn State	60–62	Loss	Memorial Field House; Pittsburgh, PA
December 28, 1951	Virginia	66–52	Win	Memorial Field House; Pittsburgh, PA
January 1, 1952	Princeton Tigers	62–44	Win	Yost Field House; Ann Arbor, MI
January 5, 1952	Indiana Hoosiers (#5)	46–58	Loss	Old IU Field House; Bloomington, IN
January 7, 1952	Iowa (#12)	46–54	Loss	Yost Field House; Ann Arbor, MI
January 12, 1952	Illinois (#2)	51–67	Loss	Yost Field House; Ann Arbor, MI
January 14, 1952	Minnesota	60–70	Loss	Williams Arena; Minneapolis, MN
January 19, 1952	Michigan State	50–36	Win	Yost Field House; Ann Arbor, MI
January 21, 1952	Northwestern	57–59	Loss	Yost Field House; Ann Arbor, MI
February 2, 1952	Marquette	57–67	Loss	Milwaukee, WI
February 9, 1952	Northwestern	71–69	Win	Patten Gymnasium; Evanston, IL
February 11, 1952	Iowa (#9)	59–82	Loss	Iowa Field House; Iowa City, IA
February 16, 1952	Minnesota	44–52	Loss	Yost Field House; Ann Arbor, MI
February 18, 1952	Wisconsin	56–55	Win	Yost Field House; Ann Arbor, MI
February 23, 1952	Ohio State	67–80	Loss	Fair Grounds Coliseum; Columbus, OH
February 25, 1952	Wisconsin	53–69	Loss	Wisconsin Field House; Madison, WI
March 1, 1952	Michigan State	59–80	Loss	Jenison Fieldhouse; East Lansing, MI
March 3, 1952	Purdue	68–60	Win	Yost Field House; Ann Arbor, MI

=== Game summaries ===
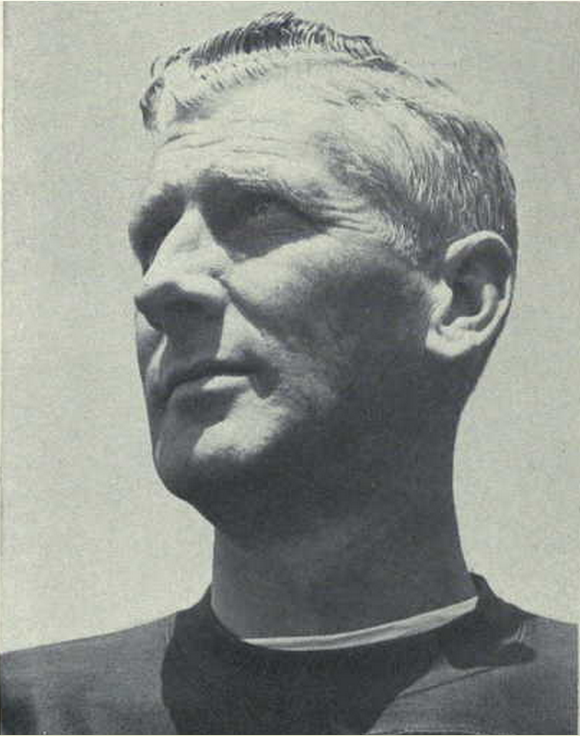
Head coach Ernie McCoy denied the Inter-Racial Association's 1951 accusation of discrimination.

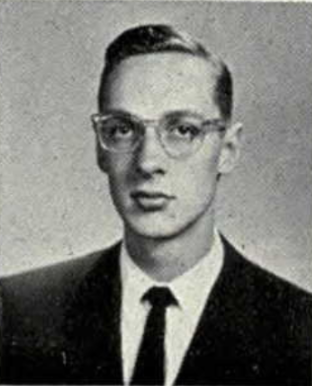
Sophomore Milt Mead was Michigan's second leading scorer.

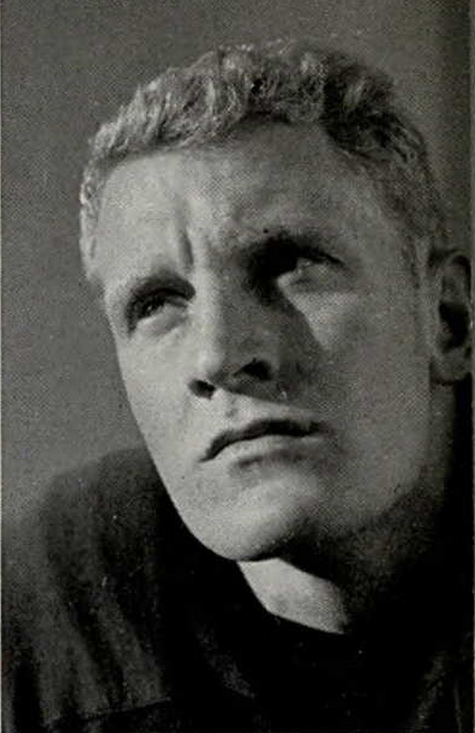
Guard Bob Topp went on to play in the NFL for the New York Giants.

Game 1: at Central Michigan. Michigan opened the 1951–52 season on December 1, 1951, with a 60–43 loss to the Central Michigan Chippewas. The game was played before a crowd of 3,500 and marked the dedication of Central Michigan's newly completed field house at Mt. Pleasant, Michigan. Don Eaddy "sunk four long set shots" for eight points, marking the first points scored by an African-American basketball player at Michigan. Another African-American player, John Codwell, also appeared in the game and scored one point on a free throw. Team captain Jim Skala and starting center Dick "Stick" Williams both fouled out for Michigan, and head coach Ernie McCoy used a total of 14 players in the game. Milt Mead, playing as a forward, was the high scorer for Michigan with 16 points, and Eaddy's eight points was the second-highest total for the Wolverines. After the loss, The Michigan Daily wrote that the Wolverines had 16 days to recover from the "humiliating" defeat.

Game 2: Butler. On December 17, 1951, the Wolverines lost their first home game of the season, falling to the Butler Bulldogs by a 63–53 score at Yost Field House. Butler jumped out to a 15–4 lead at the end of the first quarter. The Wolverines suffered from poor shooting, converting 20 of 73 field goal attempts (27%) and 13 of 26 free throws. Head coach Ernie McCoy experimented with multiple combinations, using 11 players in the game. Butler's Orvis Burdsall scored 29 points, breaking Mack Supronowicz's Yost Field House scoring record of 28 points. Senior captain Jim Skala scored 14 points for Michigan. Freshman forward Ralph Kaufman and center Dick "Stick" Williams also scored 12 points each.

Game 3: Penn. On December 20, 1951, the Wolverines lost by a 68–63 score to the Penn Quakers at Yost Field House. The attendance at the game was estimated at 500. Michigan led 63–62 with two minutes left in the game, but the Quakers scored six straight points to take the lead and win the game. Michigan's high scorer in the game was center Dick "Stick" Williams with 19 points, followed by forward Jim Skala with 15 points and guard Don Eaddy with 12 points.

Game 4: Colorado. The Wolverines won their first game of the season by a 58–55 score in a Christmas Eve match against the University of Colorado at Yost Field House. Starting center Dick Williams twisted an ankle and did not score. Sophomore Milt Mead, playing at the forward position, led Michigan with 17 points. Jim Skala scored 14 and Don Eaddy added 11 points.

Game 5: Steel Bowl – Penn State. On December 27, 1951, Michigan lost to Penn State by a 62–60 score in the opening game of the first Steel Bowl basketball tournament. The tournament was hosted by the University of Pittsburgh at its new Memorial Field House. Michigan led 18–6 at the end of the first quarter and 32–28 at halftime. The third quarter ended with the game deadlocked at 48–48. Michigan was outscored in the fourth quarter 14–12 as the Wolverines missed eight free throws in the final quarter. Milt Mead was the high scorer for Michigan with 18 points on five field goals and eight of ten free throws. Dick Williams and Doug Lawrence each scored 10 points for Michigan. Don Eaddy hit one field goal and four of seven free throws for six points. John Codwell hit two field goals, but missed three free throws, for four points.

Game 6: Steel Bowl – Virginia. On December 28, 1951, Michigan defeated Virginia by a 66–52 score in the consolation game of the Steel Bowl basketball tournament. The game was played at the Memorial Field House in Pittsburgh. Penn State defeated Pitt in the main game to win the Steel Bowl championship.

Game 7: Princeton. On New Year's Day, January 1, 1952, the Wolverines defeated the Princeton Tigers by a 62–44 score at Yost Field House. The game had an estimated attendance of 400. The Princeton team was coached by Franklin Cappon, who had been a basketball player and coach at Michigan in the 1920s and 1930s. The game was the team's most convincing victory of the season, as Michigan led by as many as 21 points in the third quarter. Center Dick Williams led the Wolverines with 18 points. Jim Skala had 16 points, and Don Eaddy scored nine.

Game 8: at Indiana. On January 5, 1952, the Wolverines lost by a 58–46 score to an Indiana Hoosiers team that had won seven consecutive games and was ranked No. 5 in the country. The game was played at the Old IU Field House in Bloomington, Indiana. The Hoosiers took an early lead, but the Wolverines tied the score at 33–33 in the third quarter against Indiana's second string players. Jim Skala was Michigan's leading scorer with 20 points on nine field goals and two free throws. Dick Williams had 16 points on six field goals and four free throws. No other Michigan player scored more than four points in the game.

Game 9: Iowa. On January 7, 1952, the Wolverines lost at home to an undefeated Iowa Hawkeyes team that was ranked No. 12 in the country. The game was played before a crowd of 1,500 at Yost Field House. Iowa's 6 foot, 8 inch center Chuck Darling scored 18 points for the Hawkeyes. Milt Mead, playing at center, led the scoring for Michigan with 12 points, and forward Jim Skala followed with 10 points. Guard Don Eaddy and forward Bob Jewell each scored six points. The Wolverines improved their free throw shooting, making 14 of 18 tries.

Game 10: Illinois. On January 12, 1952, the Wolverines lost their third straight game against a nationally ranked Big Ten opponent. They lost at home by a 67–51 score to an Illinois Fighting Illini team that was ranked No. 2 in the country. The Illini had won ten consecutive games, took a 41–24 lead at halftime and held the lead through the second half. Guard Doug Lawrence led Michigan in scoring with 12 points and "hit six long set shots" for Michigan, including a shot from half court as time expired in the third quarter. Center Dick Williams scored eight points but missed four of six free throws. Don Eaddy added seven points, including three of six free throws. Milt Mead scored six.

Game 11: at Minnesota. On January 14, 1952, the Wolverines lost their fourth consecutive game, falling to Minnesota by a 70–60 score in Minneapolis. The Associated Press reported that Minnesota jumped to a 24–11 lead in the first quarter over "hapless Michigan" before Minnesota coach Ozzie Cowles put his first-string players on the bench. Minnesota was ahead 57–40 late in the game when Cowles put his third-string players into the game. The Wolverines launched a comeback against Minnesota's third string but still fell short by 10 points. Guard Bob Topp was Michigan's high scorer with nine points on three field goals and three free throws. Jim Skala and Ray Pavichevich each added seven points, while Doug Lawrence and Bob Jewell scored six points each.

Game 12: Michigan State. On January 19, 1952, Michigan stemmed its losing streak with a 50–36 victory over Michigan State at Yost Field House in front of a crowd of 5,800. Michigan converted only one field goal in the second quarter, and the Spartans led 18–12 at halftime. The Wolverines rallied in the third quarter, scoring 21 points to take a 33–29 lead. The Spartans scored only seven points in the fourth quarter and converted only 17% of their field goals in the game. Milt Mead was the leading scorer for Michigan with 16 points, and Don Eaddy added 13 points. Keith Stackhouse led the Spartans with 15 points. In holding the Spartans to only 36 points, the Wolverines mounted their best defensive scoring performance since holding the Spartans to 33 points in December 1948. The Spartans have not scored 36 points or less in the 60-plus years since.

Game 13: Northwestern. On January 21, 1952, the Wolverines lost by a 59–57 score to the Northwestern Wildcats at Yost Field House. In a close game, the score was tied 19–19 at the end of the first quarter and 33–33 at halftime. Four of Michigan's five starters (Jim Skala, Ray Pavichevich, Milt Mead and Doug Lawrence) fouled out of the game. Skala and Don Eaddy each scored 14 points for Michigan. Mead scored 12, and Bob Jewell scored nine.

Game 14: at Marquette. On February 2, 1952, the Wolverines lost to the Marquette Hilltoppers by a 67–57 score in Milwaukee, Wisconsin. Marquette had lost six straight games prior to the game. Marquette trailed 28–26 at halftime but scored 27 points in the third quarter to take the lead. Milt Mead was Michigan's high scorer with 21 points.

Game 15: at Northwestern. On February 9, 1952, the Wolverines defeated the Northwestern Wildcats by a 71–69 score at Evanston High School in Evanston, Illinois. Don Eaddy and Doug Lawrence led a 13-point rally in the fourth quarter to lead the Wolverines to a come-from-behind victory.

Game 16: at Iowa. On February 11, 1952, the Wolverines lost by an 82–59 score at Iowa City against an Iowa team that was ranked No. 9 in the country. Iowa coach Bucky O'Connor gave extensive playing time to his second- and third-string players, using 17 players in the game. Back-up forward Tom Tiernan was Michigan's high scorer with 12 points.

Game 17: Minnesota. On February 16, 1952, Michigan lost to Minnesota by a 52–44 score at Yost Field House. Minnesota was coached by former Michigan coach Ozzie Cowles. Michigan led 36–35 at the end of the third quarter but was outscored 17–8 in the fourth quarter. Milt Mead was the top scorer for Michigan with 18 of the Wolverines' 44 points. Carl Brunsting sustained a broken foot prior to the game and was lost to the team for the remainder of the season.

Game 18: Wisconsin. On February 18, 1952, Michigan defeated Wisconsin by a 56–55 score at Yost Field House. Michigan outscored Wisconsin 11–4 in the fourth quarter and began freezing the ball and stalling with four minutes left in the game. Milt Mead fouled out of the game with three minutes left, but John Codwell replaced him and scored nine points. Head coach Ernie McCoy used only six players in the entire game.

Game 19: at Ohio State. On February 23, 1952, the Wolverines lost to Ohio State by an 80–67 score at the Fair Grounds Coliseum in Columbus, Ohio. Ohio State center Paul Ebert scored 40 points in the game, including 27 points in the second half. Michigan suffered from poor shooting, converting 22 of 73 field goal attempts. With the loss, Michigan fell into a tie with Wisconsin for ninth place in the conference. Milt Mead, playing at the center position, was the top scorer for Michigan with 19 points on five field goals and 9 of 11 free throws. Forward Jim Skala added 13 points on five field goals and 3 of 6 free throws. Forward Jack Levitt scored seven points, and Don Eaddy added six.

Game 20: at Wisconsin. On February 25, 1952, the Wolverines lost to the Wisconsin Badgers by a 69–53 score in Madison, Wisconsin. Wisconsin took a 43–21 lead in the third quarter and "coasted from there." Michigan committed 31 personal fouls in the game, and the Badgers set a Wisconsin Field House record with 42 free throw attempts (32 of which were converted). Jim Skala and Don Eaddy both fouled out of the game. Guard Doug Lawrence was Michigan's top scorer with 15 points, Another guard Ray Pavichevich scored 11 points, and center Milt Mead added 10.

Game 21: at Michigan State. On March 1, 1952, the Wolverines lost to the Michigan State Spartans by an 80–59 score. The game was played before a crowd of 8,623 at Jenison Fieldhouse in East Lansing. Michigan continued to suffer from fouls, committing 35 personal fouls in the game. Michigan State's Bob Carey, an All-American for the Spartans' football team, led the scoring with 25 points. Don Eaddy was the high scorer for Michigan with 18 points on eight field goals and two free throws. Jim Skala scored 11 points while Milt Mead added seven and Paul Groffsky and Doug Lawrence each scored six. With the defeat, the Wolverines fell to a 3–10 conference record and a tie with Purdue for last place in the Big Ten.

Game 22: Purdue. On March 3, 1952, the Wolverines won the final game of their season by a 68–60 score against Purdue at Yost Field House. The game matched teams that had been tied for last place in the Big Ten, and the victory saved the Wolverines from finishing the season in last place. In his final game for Michigan, senior captain Jim Skala scored 23 points, closing his career with 508 points. Don Eaddy scored 19 points, including 14 points on "long two-handed set shots." Milt Mead also scored 10 points for the Wolverines. Michigan converted 27 of 79 field goal attempts for 34% shooting.

=== Scoring statistics ===
The following list compiles the scoring statistics for the 1951–52 Michigan Wolverines men's basketball team. The nine players who were awarded varsity letters for their participation on the team are shown in bold.

**Player**	**Pos.**	**Yr**	**G**	**FG**	**FT**	**RB**	**Pts**	**PPG**
**Jim Skala**	F	Sr.	22	104	50		258	11.7
**Milt Mead**	F/C	Soph.	22	81	76		238	10.8
**Don Eaddy**	G	Fr.	22	77	34		188	8.5
**J. Douglas Lawrence**	G	Jr.	22	57	33		147	6.7
Dick Williams	C	Jr.	11	39	22		100	9.1
**Ray Pavichevich**	G/F	Soph.	22	35	28		98	4.5
Bob Jewell	F/C	Fr.	14	22	13		57	4.0
Ralph Kaufman	F/G	Fr.	11	10	16		36	3.3
**John E. Codwell, Jr.**	F/C	Soph.	14	8	18		34	2.4
Tom Tiernan	F/G		8	10	4		24	3.0
**Bob Topp**	G	Soph.	17	8	7		23	1.4
Sydney P. Cook, Jr.	G	Jr.	7	3	6		12	1.7
**Jack Levitt**	F/C	Sr.	12	3	5		11	0.9
Jerome Stearn	F	Fr.	3	4	1		9	3.0
Paul Groffsky	C	Fr.	2	3	2		8	4.0
**Carl D. Brunsting**	F/G	Jr.	10	2	1		5	0.5
Bruce B. Allen	F/C	Fr.	1	0	0		0	0.0
**Totals**			22	466	316		1248	56.7
