= 1951–52 Iowa Hawkeyes men's basketball team =

American college basketball season

1951–52 Iowa Hawkeyes men's basketball
- Conference: Big Ten Conference

Ranking
- Coaches: No. 8
- AP: No. 7
- Record: 19–3 (11–3 Big Ten)
- Head coach: Bucky O'Connor (1st season)
- Home arena: Iowa Field House

1951–52 Big Ten Conference men's basketball standings
| | Conf. | | | | Overall |
| Team | W | | L | PCT | W | | L | PCT |
|---|---|---|---|---|---|---|---|---|
| No. 2 Illinois | 12 | – | 2 | .857 | 22 | – | 4 | .846 |
| No. 7 Iowa | 11 | – | 3 | .786 | 19 | – | 3 | .864 |
| Minnesota | 10 | – | 4 | .714 | 15 | – | 7 | .682 |
| Indiana | 9 | – | 5 | .643 | 16 | – | 6 | .727 |
| Michigan State | 6 | – | 8 | .429 | 13 | – | 9 | .591 |
| Ohio State | 6 | – | 8 | .429 | 8 | – | 14 | .364 |
| Wisconsin | 5 | – | 9 | .357 | 10 | – | 12 | .455 |
| Michigan | 4 | – | 10 | .286 | 7 | – | 15 | .318 |
| Northwestern | 4 | – | 10 | .286 | 7 | – | 15 | .318 |
| Purdue | 3 | – | 11 | .214 | 8 | – | 14 | .364 |
Rankings from AP Poll

The 1951–52 Iowa Hawkeyes men's basketball team represented the University of Iowa in intercollegiate basketball during the 1951–52 season. The team was led by first-year head coach Bucky O'Connor and played their home games at the Iowa Field House. The Hawkeyes finished the season with a 19–3 record (11–3 in Big Ten) and in second place in the Big Ten standings.

== Roster ==
1951–52 Iowa Hawkeyes men's basketball team
Players
Coaches

| Pos. | # | Name | Height | Weight | Year | Hometown |
|---|---|---|---|---|---|---|
| G | 23 | Bob Clifton | 6 ft 4 in (1.93 m) | — | Sr | – |
| C | 27 | Chuck Darling | 6 ft 8 in (2.03 m) | 220 lb (100 kg) | Sr | Denison, IA |
| F | 7 | McKinley Davis | 6 ft 2 in (1.88 m) | — | Fr | Freeport, IL |
| G | 16 | Herald Greene | 6 ft 0 in (1.83 m) | — | Sr | – |
| F | 25 | Herb Thompson | 6 ft 2 in (1.88 m) | — | Jr | – |

Head coach

- Bucky O'Connor (Drake)

Assistant coach(es)

Legend

- (C) Team captain
- (S) Suspended
- (I) Ineligible
- (W) Walk-on
- Injured
- Current redshirt

== Schedule/results ==
| Date time, TV | Rank^{#} | Opponent^{#} | Result | Record | Site (attendance) city, state |
Non-conference
| Dec 1, 1951* | | Western Michigan | W 72–68 | 1–0 | Iowa Field House; Iowa City, Iowa |
| Dec 8, 1951* | | DePauw | W 69–53 | 2–0 | Iowa Field House; Iowa City, Iowa |
| Dec 15, 1951* | | at Missouri | W 48–43 | 3–0 | Brewer Fieldhouse; Columbia, Missouri |
| Dec 17, 1951* | | at Washington (MO) | W 60–53 | 4–0 | WU Field House; St. Louis, Missouri |
| Dec 20, 1951* | | Oklahoma | W 59–46 | 5–0 | Iowa Field House; Iowa City, Iowa |
| Dec 27, 1951* | | at California | W 69–64 | 6–0 | Cow Palace; Daly City, California |
| Dec 28, 1951* | | vs. Oregon | W 86–72 | 7–0 | Cow Palace; Daly City, California |
Conference
| Jan 5, 1952 | No. 12 | at No. 20 Michigan State | W 61–60 | 8–0 (1–0) | Jenison Field House; East Lansing, Michigan |
| Jan 7, 1952 | No. 12 | at Michigan | W 54–46 | 9–0 (2–0) | Yost Field House; Ann Arbor, Michigan |
| Jan 12, 1952 | No. 10 | No. 4 Indiana | W 78–59 | 10–0 (3–0) | Iowa Field House; Iowa City, Iowa |
| Jan 14, 1952 | No. 10 | Northwestern | W 78–64 | 11–0 (4–0) | Iowa Field House; Iowa City, Iowa |
| Jan 19, 1952 | No. 4 | Minnesota | W 76–59 | 12–0 (5–0) | Iowa Field House; Iowa City, Iowa |
| Jan 21, 1952 | No. 4 | at No. 14 Indiana | L 69–82 | 12–1 (5–1) | The Fieldhouse; Bloomington, Indiana |
| Feb 4, 1952* | No. 8 | Butler | W 58–57 | 13–1 | Iowa Field House; Iowa City, Iowa |
| Feb 9, 1952 | No. 9 | No. 3 Illinois | W 73–68 | 14–1 (6–1) | Iowa Field House; Iowa City, Iowa |
| Feb 11, 1952 | No. 9 | Michigan | W 82–59 | 15–1 (7–1) | Iowa Field House; Iowa City, Iowa |
| Feb 16, 1952 | No. 5 | at Purdue | W 90–67 | 16–1 (8–1) | Lambert Fieldhouse; West Lafayette, Indiana |
| Feb 18, 1952 | No. 5 | at Ohio State | W 75–62 | 17–1 (9–1) | Ohio State Men's Gym; Columbus, Ohio |
| Feb 23, 1952 | No. 4 | at No. 5 Illinois; Rivalry | L 62–78 | 17–2 (9–2) | Huff Hall; Champaign, Illinois |
| Feb 25, 1952 | No. 4 | Michigan State | W 64–52 | 18–2 (10–2) | Iowa Field House; Iowa City, Iowa |
| Mar 1, 1952 | No. 7 | at Northwestern | W 77–68 | 19–2 (11–2) | Evanston High School; Evanston, Illinois |
| Mar 3, 1952 | No. 7 | Wisconsin | L 75–78 | 19–3 (11–3) | Iowa Field House (13,720); Iowa City, Iowa |
*Non-conference game. ^{#}Rankings from AP Poll. (#) Tournament seedings in parentheses.

== Honors and awards ==
- Chuck Darling – Chicago Tribune Silver Basketball, Consensus First-team All-American

== NBA draft ==
| Round | Pick | Player | NBA club |
|---|---|---|---|
| 1 | 8 | Chuck Darling | Rochester Royals |
