= List of Iowa Hawkeyes men's basketball seasons =

This is a list of seasons completed by the Iowa Hawkeyes men's basketball program since the team became a varsity sport in 1901. The program began competing in the Big Ten Conference in 1908.

== Seasons ==
Statistics overview
Season	Coach	Overall	Conference	Standing	Postseason
(Independent) (1901–1908)
1901–02	Ed Rule	10–2			
1902–03	Fred Bailey	4–3			
1903–04	Ed Rule	6–2			
1904–05	John Chalmers	6–8			
1905–06	Ed Rule	11–5			
1906–07	John Griffith	5–5			
1907–08	Ed Rule	10–6			
John Griffith (Big Ten Conference) (1908–1910)
1908–09	John Griffith	8–7	1–5	8th	
1909–10	John Griffith	11–3	2–2	T–5th	
Walter Stewart (Big Ten Conference) (1910–1912)
1910–11	Walter Stewart	9–4	2–2	T–5th	
1911–12	Walter Stewart	6–8	0–4	T–7th	
Floyd Thomas (Big Ten Conference) (1912–1913)
1912–13	Floyd Thomas	9–13	1–5	8th	
Maury Kent (Big Ten Conference) (1913–1918)
1913–14	Maury Kent	9–7	1–5	8th	
1914–15	Maury Kent	9–8	2–6	7th	
1915–16	Maury Kent	11–4	2–4	7th	
1916–17	Maury Kent	7–9	1–8	9th	
1917–18	Maury Kent	6–8	4–6	9th	
Edwin Bannick (Big Ten Conference) (1918–1919)
1918–19	Edwin Bannick	8–7	4–7	T–7th	
James Ashmore (Big Ten Conference) (1919–1922)
1919–20	James Ashmore	9–10	6–6	6th	
1920–21	James Ashmore	9–9	6–5	T–6th	
1921–22	James Ashmore	11–7	5–6	5th	
Sam Barry (Big Ten Conference) (1922–1929)
1922–23	Sam Barry	13–2	11–1	T–1st	
1923–24	Sam Barry	7–10	4–8	9th	
1924–25	Sam Barry	6–10	5–7	7th	
1925–26	Sam Barry	12–5	8–4	T–1st	
1926–27	Sam Barry	9–8	7–5	T–4th	
1927–28	Sam Barry	6–11	3–9	T–7th	
1928–29	Sam Barry	9–8	5–7	7th	
Rollie Williams (Big Ten Conference) (1929–1942)
1929–30	Rollie Williams	4–13	0–0	10th	
1930–31	Rollie Williams	5–12	2–10	10th	
1931–32	Rollie Williams	5–12	3–9	T–8th	
1932–33	Rollie Williams	15–5	8–4	T–3rd	
1933–34	Rollie Williams	13–6	6–6	T–5th	
1934–35	Rollie Williams	10–9	6–6	6th	
1935–36	Rollie Williams	9–10	5–7	T–6th	
1936–37	Rollie Williams	11–9	3–9	T–8th	
1937–38	Rollie Williams	11–9	6–6	T–5th	
1938–39	Rollie Williams	8–11	3–9	10th	
1939–40	Rollie Williams	9–12	4–8	8th	
1940–41	Rollie Williams	12–8	4–8	8th	
1941–42	Rollie Williams	12–8	10–5	T–2nd	
Pops Harrison (Big Ten Conference) (1942–1950)
1942–43	Pops Harrison	7–10	3–9	9th	
1943–44	Pops Harrison	14–4	9–3	T–2nd	
1944–45	Pops Harrison	17–1	11–1	1st	
1945–46	Pops Harrison	14–4	8–4	T–3rd	
1946–47	Pops Harrison	12–7	5–7	T–6th	
1947–48	Pops Harrison	15–4	8–4	2nd	
1948–49	Pops Harrison	10–10	3–9	8th	
1949–50	Pops Harrison; Bucky O'Connor	15–7^{[Note A]}	6–6^{[Note A]}	5th	
Rollie Williams (Big Ten Conference) (1950–1951)
1950–51	Rollie Williams	15–7	9–5	3rd	
Bucky O'Connor (Big Ten Conference) (1951–1958)
1951–52	Bucky O'Connor	19–3	11–3	2nd	
1952–53	Bucky O'Connor	12–10	9–9	6th	
1953–54	Bucky O'Connor	17–5	11–3	2nd	
1954–55	Bucky O'Connor	19–7	11–3	1st	NCAA final Four
1955–56	Bucky O'Connor	20–6	13–1	1st	NCAA Runner-up
1956–57	Bucky O'Connor	8–14	4–10	8th	
1957–58	Bucky O'Connor	13–9	7–7	6th	
Sharm Scheuerman (Big Ten Conference) (1958–1964)
1958–59	Sharm Scheuerman	10–12	7–7	T-5th	
1959–60	Sharm Scheuerman	14–10	6–8	T-6th	
1960–61	Sharm Scheuerman	18–6	10–4	T-2nd	
1961–62	Sharm Scheuerman	13–11	7–7	T-4th	
1962–63	Sharm Scheuerman	9–15	5–9	8th	
1963–64	Sharm Scheuerman	8–15	3–11	9th	
Ralph Miller (Big Ten Conference) (1964–1970)
1964–65	Ralph Miller	14–10	8–6	5th	
1965–66	Ralph Miller	17–7	8–6	3rd	
1966–67	Ralph Miller	16–8	9–5	3rd	
1967–68	Ralph Miller	16–9	10–4	T-1st	
1968–69	Ralph Miller	12–12	5–9	8th	
1969–70	Ralph Miller	20–5	14–0	1st	NCAA University Division Sweet Sixteen
Dick Schultz (Big Ten Conference) (1970–1974)
1970–71	Dick Schultz	9–15	4–10	T–7th	
1971–72	Dick Schultz	11–13	5–9	T–8th	
1972–73	Dick Schultz	13–11	6–8	T–6th	
1973–74	Dick Schultz	8–16	5–9	7th	
Lute Olson (Big Ten Conference) (1974–1983)
1974–75	Lute Olson	10–16	7–11	7th	
1975–76	Lute Olson	19–10	9–9	5th	
1976–77	Lute Olson	20–7	12–6	4th	
1977–78	Lute Olson	12–15	5–13	8th	
1978–79	Lute Olson	20–8	13–5	1st	NCAA Division I first round
1979–80	Lute Olson	23–10	10–8	4th	NCAA Division I Final Four
1980–81	Lute Olson	21–7	13–5	2nd	NCAA Division I first round
1981–82	Lute Olson	21–8	12–6	2nd	NCAA Division I second round
1982–83	Lute Olson	21–10	10–8	T–2nd	NCAA Division I Sweet Sixteen
George Raveling (Big Ten Conference) (1984–1986)
1983–84	George Raveling	13–15	6–12	T–7th	
1984–85	George Raveling	21–11	10–8	5th	NCAA Division I first round
1985–86	George Raveling	20–12	10–8	6th	NCAA Division I first round
Tom Davis (Big Ten Conference) (1986–1999)
1986–87	Tom Davis	30–5	14–4	3rd	NCAA Division I Elite Eight
1987–88	Tom Davis	24–10	12–6	3rd	NCAA Division I Sweet Sixteen
1988–89	Tom Davis	23–10	10–8	4th	NCAA Division I second round
1989–90	Tom Davis	12–16	4–14	T–8th	
1990–91	Tom Davis	21–11	9–9	T–5th	NCAA Division I second round
1991–92	Tom Davis	19–11	10–8	5th	NCAA Division I second round
1992–93	Tom Davis	23–9	11–7	T–3rd	NCAA Division I second round
1993–94	Tom Davis	11–16	5–13	T–9th	
1994–95	Tom Davis	21–12	9–9	T–7th	NIT Quarterfinal
1995–96	Tom Davis	23–9^{[Note B]}	11–7^{[Note B]}	4th	NCAA Division I second round
1996–97	Tom Davis	22–10	12–6	T–2nd	NCAA Division I second round
1997–98	Tom Davis	20–11	9–7	T–5th	NIT first round
1998–99	Tom Davis	20–10	9–7	T–3rd	NCAA Division I Sweet Sixteen
Steve Alford (Big Ten Conference) (1999–2007)
1999–00	Steve Alford	14–16	6–10	T–7th	
2000–01	Steve Alford	23–12	7–9	T–6th	NCAA Division I second round
2001–02	Steve Alford	19–16	5–11	T–8th	NIT first round
2002–03	Steve Alford	17–14	7–9	T–8th	NIT second round
2003–04	Steve Alford	16–13	9–7	4th	NIT first round
2004–05	Steve Alford	21–12	7–9	7th	NCAA Division I first round
2005–06	Steve Alford	25–9	11–5	T–2nd	NCAA Division I first round
2006–07	Steve Alford	17–14	9–7	T–4th	
Todd Lickliter (Big Ten Conference) (2007–2010)
2007–08	Todd Lickliter	13–19	6–12	8th	
2008–09	Todd Lickliter	15–17	5–13	10th	
2009–10	Todd Lickliter	10–22	4–14	T–9th	
Fran McCaffery (Big Ten Conference) (2010–2025)
2010–11	Fran McCaffery	11–20	4–14	10th	
2011–12	Fran McCaffery	18–17	8–10	T–7th	NIT second round
2012–13	Fran McCaffery	25–13	9–9	6th	NIT Runner-up
2013–14	Fran McCaffery	20–13	9–9	6th	NCAA Division I First Four
2014–15	Fran McCaffery	22–12	12–6	T–3rd	NCAA Division I second round
2015–16	Fran McCaffery	22–11	12–6	T–3rd	NCAA Division I second round
2016–17	Fran McCaffery	19–15	10–8	T–5th	NIT second round
2017–18	Fran McCaffery	14–19	4–14	T–11th	
2018–19	Fran McCaffery	23–12	10–10	6th	NCAA Division I second round
2019–20	Fran McCaffery	20–11	11–9	T–5th	No postseason held
2020–21	Fran McCaffery	22–9	14–6	3rd	NCAA Division I second round
2021–22	Fran McCaffery	26–10	12–8	5th	NCAA Division I first round
2022–23	Fran McCaffery	19–14	11–9	5th	NCAA Division I first round
2023–24	Fran McCaffery	19–15	10–10	T–6th	NIT second round
2024–25	Fran McCaffery	17–16	7–13	T–12th	
Ben McCollum (Big Ten Conference) (2025–present)
2025–26	Ben McCollum	24–13	10–10	9th	NCAA Division I Elite Eight
Total:		1,797–1,248			
National champion Postseason invitational champion Conference regular season champion Conference regular season and conference tournament champion Division regular season champion Division regular season and conference tournament champion Conference tournament champion

^A. O'Connor coached the last 11 games of the 1950 season, going 6–5 and 5–5 in Big Ten play. Harrison, who started the season, went 9–2 and 1–1 in conference.
^B. Iowa's original 1995–96 record was 23–9 (11–7 Big Ten), but the NCAA awarded Iowa a win by forfeit for the January 3, 1996 game at Purdue, originally an 85–61 loss, due to NCAA violations by Purdue.
