= 1951–52 Illinois Fighting Illini men's basketball team =

American college basketball season

1951–52 Illinois Fighting Illini men's basketball

Big Ten conference champions

NCAA men's Division I tournament, Final Four
- Conference: Big Ten Conference

Ranking
- Coaches: No. 2
- AP: No. 2
- Record: 22–4 (12–2 Big Ten)
- Head coach: Harry Combes (5th season)
- Assistant coaches: Howie Braun (15th season); Cal Luther (1st season)
- MVP: Rod Fletcher
- Captain: Rod Fletcher
- Home arena: Huff Hall

1951–52 Big Ten Conference men's basketball standings
	Conf.				Overall
Team	W		L	PCT	W		L	PCT
No. 2 Illinois	12	–	2	.857	22	–	4	.846
No. 7 Iowa	11	–	3	.786	19	–	3	.864
Minnesota	10	–	4	.714	15	–	7	.682
Indiana	9	–	5	.643	16	–	6	.727
Michigan State	6	–	8	.429	13	–	9	.591
Ohio State	6	–	8	.429	8	–	14	.364
Wisconsin	5	–	9	.357	10	–	12	.455
Michigan	4	–	10	.286	7	–	15	.318
Northwestern	4	–	10	.286	7	–	15	.318
Purdue	3	–	11	.214	8	–	14	.364
Rankings from AP Poll

"1951-52 Fighting Illini men's basketball team"

"1951-52 Fighting Illini men's basketball team"

The 1951–52 Illinois Fighting Illini men’s basketball team represented the University of Illinois.

== Regular season ==
The 1951-52 Fighting Illini men's basketball team had reached a level of national prominence that was only bettered by the 1914-15 national championship team. Head coach Harry Combes had guided his team to a Big Ten championship, a third place finish in the 1952 NCAA Division I men's basketball tournament and a final AP ranking of No. 2 in the nation. Combes was beginning to build a dynasty in Champaign with 3 Big Ten Championships and 3 third place finishes in the NCAA tournament in his first 5 years at the helm. The 1951-52 season not only brought Illinois another Big Ten title, it also introduced John Kerr, a center from Tilden Tech in Chicago. He began his three-year reign as Illinois’ top scorer with a sophomore-record 357 points. The Illini recorded a 22-4 overall mark and went 12-2 in the conference. Once again, Illinois advanced to the national semifinals and ran into underdog St. John’s. The Redmen fought their way to a 61-59 victory in the NCAA’s first Final Four, in Seattle. Illinois took another third-place award home after beating Santa Clara, 67-64, behind 26 points by Kerr. At the conclusion of the tournament, Kerr and James Bredar were named to the Final Four All-Tournament team. Subsequently, at the conclusion of the season, Rodney Fletcher was named a Consensus 1st team All-American.

The starting lineup for the season included captain Rodney Fletcher, James Bredar and Irving Bemoras at guard, Clive Follmer at the forward slot with Robert Peterson and, future hall of famer Johnny "Red" Kerr at the center position. The team also included former University of Minnesota head coach Jim Dutcher.

=== Roster ===
1951–52 Illinois Fighting Illini men's basketball team
Players
Coaches

Pos.	#	Name	Height	Weight	Year	Previous school	Hometown
G	9	Elmer Plew	6 ft 0 in (1.83 m)	170 lb (77 kg)	Fr	Paris High School	Paris, Illinois
F	11	Jim Dutcher	6 ft 3 in (1.91 m)	185 lb (84 kg)	Fr	Downers Grove High School	Downers Grove, Illinois
G	16	Jim Wright	6 ft 0 in (1.83 m)	160 lb (73 kg)	So	Lawrenceville High School	Lawrenceville, Illinois
G	19	James Bredar	5 ft 11 in (1.8 m)	167 lb (76 kg)	Jr	Salem High School	Salem, Illinois
C	22	Johnny Kerr	6 ft 9 in (2.06 m)	205 lb (93 kg)	So	Tilden High School	Chicago, Illinois
F	24	Ed Makovsky	6 ft 5 in (1.96 m)	194 lb (88 kg)	So	Morton High School	Cicero, Illinois
C	25	Robert Peterson	6 ft 8 in (2.03 m)	235 lb (107 kg)	Jr	Elgin High School	Wayne, Illinois
G	26	Irving Bemoras	6 ft 3.5 in (1.92 m)	185 lb (84 kg)	Jr	Marshall High School	Chicago, Illinois
C	27	Mack Follmer	6 ft 4 in (1.93 m)	200 lb (91 kg)	Sr	Forrest High School	Forrest, Illinois
F	29	Max Baumgardner	6 ft 3 in (1.91 m)	175 lb (79 kg)	Jr	Sterling High School	Sterling, Illinois
F	33	Clive Follmer	6 ft 4 in (1.93 m)	195 lb (88 kg)	Jr	Forrest High School	Forrest, Illinois
G	34	Seymour Gantman	5 ft 7 in (1.7 m)	165 lb (75 kg)	Sr	Marshall High School	Chicago, Illinois
G	35	Ren Alde	6 ft 2 in (1.88 m)	180 lb (82 kg)	Sr	Pana High School	Pana, Illinois
G	37	Rod Fletcher (C)	6 ft 4 in (1.93 m)	194 lb (88 kg)	Sr	Champaign Central High School	Champaign, Illinois
G	38	Herb Gerecke	6 ft 1 in (1.85 m)	180 lb (82 kg)	Sr	Pekin High School	Pekin, Illinois
F	41	Max Hooper	6 ft 5 in (1.96 m)	200 lb (91 kg)	So	Mt. Vernon High School	Mt. Vernon, Illinois
G	44	Walt Moore	6 ft 2 in (1.88 m)	165 lb (75 kg)	Fr	Mt. Vernon High School	Mt. Vernon, Illinois
G	47	Dick Christiansen	6 ft 3.5 in (1.92 m)	180 lb (82 kg)	Sr	New Trier High School	Winnetka, Illinois
G	48	James Schuldt	6 ft 0 in (1.83 m)	193 lb (88 kg)	Jr	Dundee Community High School	Dundee, Illinois

Head coach

- Harry Combes (University of Illinois) (5th year)

Assistant coach(es)

- Howie Braun (University of Illinois) (15th year)
- Cal Luther (Valparaiso University) (1st year)

Legend

- (C) Team captain
- (S) Suspended
- (I) Ineligible
- (W) Walk-on
- Injured
- Current redshirt

Roster

== Schedule ==
Date time, TV	Rank^{#}	Opponent^{#}	Result	Record	Site (attendance) city, state
Non-Conference regular season
12/4/1951*		at Butler	W 68–57	1-0	Hinkle Fieldhouse (3,043); Indianapolis, IN
12/12/1951*	No. 3	Loyola (Chicago)	W 74–66	2-0	Huff Hall (-); Champaign, IL
12/13/1951*	No. 3	Oklahoma	W 69-51	3-0	Huff Hall (6,505); Champaign, IL
12/20/1951*	No. 3	North Carolina	W 86–66	4-0	Huff Hall (2,899); Champaign, IL
12/22/1951*	No. 3	DePaul	W 70–61	5-0	Huff Hall (-); Champaign, IL
12/28/1951*	No. 2	No. 16 UCLA	W 73–67	6-0	Huff Hall (2,411); Champaign, IL
12/31/1951*	No. 2	Marquette	W 68–57	7-0	Marquette Gymnasium (-); Milwaukee, Wisconsin
Big Ten regular season
1/5/1952	No. 2	at Minnesota	W 52–43	8-0 (1-0)	Williams Arena (17,862); Minneapolis, MN
1/7/1952	No. 2	Wisconsin	W 53–49	9-0 (2-0)	Huff Hall (6,912); Champaign, IL
1/12/1952	No. 2	at Michigan	W 67–51	10-0 (3-0)	Yost Field House (6,300); Ann Arbor, MI
1/14/1952	No. 2	No. 4 Indiana; Rivalry	W 78–66	11-0 (4-0)	Huff Hall (6,912); Champaign, IL
1/26/1952*	No. 1	at DePaul	L 65–69	11-1	Alumni Hall (-); Chicago, IL
1/28/1952	No. 1	at Purdue	W 84–57	12-1 (5-0)	Lambert Fieldhouse (-); West Lafayette, IN
2/2/1952	No. 3	at Ohio State	W 66–62	13-1 (6-0)	Ohio Expo Center Coliseum (8,265); Columbus, OH
2/9/1952	No. 3	at No. 9 Iowa; Rivalry	L 68–73	13-2 (6-1)	Iowa Field House (-); Iowa City, IA
2/11/1952	No. 3	Michigan State	W 84–62	14-2 (7-1)	Huff Hall (6,912); Champaign, IL
2/16/1952	No. 6	Ohio State	W 80–53	15-2 (8-1)	Huff Hall (6,912); Champaign, IL
2/18/1952	No. 6	at No. 20 Indiana; Rivalry	W 77–70	16-2 (9-1)	The Fieldhouse (10,556); Bloomington, IN
2/23/1952	No. 5	No. 4 Iowa; Rivalry	W 78–62	17-2 (10-1)	Huff Hall (6,912); Champaign, IL
3/1/1952	No. 2	Purdue	W 82–71	18-2 (11-1)	Huff Hall (6,912); Champaign, IL
3/5/1952	No. 2	Northwestern; Rivalry	W 95–74	19-2 (12-1))	Huff Hall (6,912); Champaign, IL
3/8/1952	No. 2	at Wisconsin	L 48–58	19-3 (12-2)	Wisconsin Field House (13,000); Madison, WI
NCAA tournament
3/21/1952*	No. 2	vs. No. 11 Dayton; NCAA Tournament Mideast Regional first round	W 80–61	20-3	Chicago Stadium (-); Chicago, IL
3/22/1952*	No. 2	vs. No. 4 Duquesne; NCAA Tournament First Round Mideast Regional Final	W 74–68	21-3	Chicago Stadium (-); Chicago, IL
3/25/1952*	No. 2	vs. No. 10 St. Johns; NCAA Tournament National Semifinals	L 59–61	21-4	Hec Edmundson Pavilion (-); Seattle, WA
3/26/1952*	No. 2	vs. Santa Clara; NCAA Tournament National Third Place Game	W 67–64	22-4	Hec Edmundson Pavilion (-); Seattle, WA
*Non-conference game. ^{#}Rankings from AP Poll. (#) Tournament seedings in parentheses. All times are in Central Time.

== Player stats ==
Player	Games played	Field goals	Free throws	Points
John Kerr	26	143	71	357
Rod Fletcher	26	105	80	290
Irv Bemoras	26	108	69	285
Jim Bredar	26	104	52	260
Bob Peterson	26	87	77	251
Clive Follmer	20	73	91	237
Max Hooper	20	29	11	69
Herb Gerecke	20	21	17	59
Jim Wright	12	5	2	12
Dick Christiansen	10	5	1	11
Ed Makovsky	9	1	5	7
Jim Schuldt	7	1	4	6
Max Baumgardner	7	3	0	6
Jim Dutcher	5	2	2	6
Walt Moore	4	2	1	5
Mack Follmer	9	0	4	4

== Awards and honors ==
- Rod Fletcher
  - Consensus 1st team All-American (1952)
  - Look Magazine 1st team All-American (1952)
  - Converse 1st team All-American (1952)
  - Helms 1st team All-American (1952)
  - Associated Press 2nd team All-American (1952)
  - United Press International 2nd team All-American (1952)
  - International News Service 2nd team All-American (1952)
  - Collier's Weekly 2nd team All-American (1952)
  - National Association of Basketball Coaches 2nd team All-American (1952)
  - Athletic Publications 2nd team All-American (1952)
  - Team Most Valuable Player
- Irv Bemoras
  - Converse Honorable Mention All-American (1952)
  - United Press International Honorable Mention All-American (1952)
- Johnny Kerr
  - NCAA Final Four All-Tournament Team (1952)
  - Converse Honorable Mention All-American (1952)
  - United Press International Honorable Mention All-American (1952)
  - Associated Press Honorable Mention All-American (1952)
- Jim Bredar
  - NCAA Final Four All-Tournament Team (1952)
  - United Press International Honorable Mention All-American (1952)
  - Converse Honorable Mention All-American (1952)
- Bob Peterson
  - United Press International Honorable Mention All-American (1952)

== Team players drafted into the NBA ==
Player	NBA Club
Rod Fletcher	Minneapolis Lakers
