= 1951–52 Indiana Hoosiers men's basketball team =

American college basketball season

1951–52 Indiana Hoosiers men's basketball
- Conference: Big Ten Conference

Ranking
- Coaches: No. 20
- Record: 16–6 (9–5 Big Ten)
- Head coach: Branch McCracken (11th season)
- Assistant coaches: Ernie Andres; Lou Watson
- Home arena: The Fieldhouse

1951–52 Big Ten Conference men's basketball standings
	Conf.				Overall
Team	W		L	PCT	W		L	PCT
No. 2 Illinois	12	–	2	.857	22	–	4	.846
No. 7 Iowa	11	–	3	.786	19	–	3	.864
Minnesota	10	–	4	.714	15	–	7	.682
Indiana	9	–	5	.643	16	–	6	.727
Michigan State	6	–	8	.429	13	–	9	.591
Ohio State	6	–	8	.429	8	–	14	.364
Wisconsin	5	–	9	.357	10	–	12	.455
Michigan	4	–	10	.286	7	–	15	.318
Northwestern	4	–	10	.286	7	–	15	.318
Purdue	3	–	11	.214	8	–	14	.364
Rankings from AP Poll

The 1951–52 Indiana Hoosiers men's basketball team represented Indiana University. Their head coach was Branch McCracken, who was in his 11th year. The team played its home games in The Fieldhouse in Bloomington, Indiana, and was a member of the Big Ten Conference.

The Hoosiers finished the regular season with an overall record of 16–6 and a conference record of 9–5, finishing 4th in the Big Ten Conference. Indiana was not invited to participate in any postseason tournament.

== Roster ==
No.	Name	Position	Ht.	Year	Hometown
4	Dale Vieau	G	5–10	Sr.	Hammond, Indiana
5	Sam Miranda	G	5–10	Sr.	Collinsville, Illinois
9	Bob Masters	G	6–3	Sr.	Lafayette, Indiana
13	Dick Baumgartner	G	6–1	Jr.	LaPorte, Indiana
13	Sam Esposito	G	5–9	So.	Chicago
17	Bob Dobson	G	6–1	Jr.	Bloomington, Indiana
19	Jim Schooley	C	6–5	Jr.	Auburn, Indiana
21	Bobby Leonard	G	6–3	So.	Terre Haute, Indiana
22	Jim DeaKyne	G	6–3	So.	Fortville, Indiana
23	Dick Swan	F	6–4	So.	Gary, Indiana
24	John Wood	G	5–7	So.	Morristown, Indiana
25	Tony Hill	F	6–1	Sr.	Seymour, Indiana
30	Charlie Kraak	F	6–5	So.	Collinsville, Illinois
31	Dick Farley	F	6–3	So.	Winslow, Indiana
34	Don Schlundt	C	6–10	Fr.	South Bend, Indiana
35	Lou Scott	C	6–10	So.	Chicago

== Schedule/results ==
Date time, TV	Rank^{#}	Opponent^{#}	Result	Record	Site city, state
Regular season
12/6/1951*		Valparaiso	W 68–59	1–0	The Fieldhouse; Bloomington, Indiana
12/8/1951*		Xavier	W 92–69	2–0	The Fieldhouse; Bloomington, Indiana
12/14/1951*	No. 11	at Colorado A&M	W 80–48	3–0	South College Gymnasium; Fort Collins, Colorado
12/15/1951*	No. 11	at Wyoming	W 57–55	4–0	War Memorial Fieldhouse; Laramie, Wyoming
12/22/1951*	No. 6	Kansas State	W 80–75	5–0	The Fieldhouse; Bloomington, Indiana
12/28/1951*	No. 5	vs. Notre Dame; Hoosier Classic	W 67–54	6–0	Butler Fieldhouse; Indianapolis
12/29/1951*	No. 5	at Butler; Hoosier Classic	W 87–71	7–0	Butler Fieldhouse; Indianapolis
1/5/1952	No. 5	Michigan	W 58–46	8–0 (1–0)	The Fieldhouse; Bloomington, Indiana
1/7/1952	No. 5	at Ohio State	L 72–73	8–1 (1–1)	Ohio Expo Center Coliseum; Columbus, Ohio
1/12/1952	No. 4	at Iowa	L 59–78	8–2 (1–2)	Iowa Field House; Iowa City, IA
1/14/1952	No. 4	at Illinois; Rivalry	L 66–78	8–3 (1–3)	Huff Hall; Champaign, Illinois
1/19/1952	No. 14	at Purdue; Rivalry	W 82–77	9–3 (2–3)	Lambert Fieldhouse; West Lafayette, Indiana
1/21/1952	No. 14	Iowa	W 82–69	10–3 (3–3)	The Fieldhouse; Bloomington, Indiana
2/2/1952*	No. 13	St. John's	L 55–65	10–4 (3–3)	The Fieldhouse; Bloomington, Indiana
2/9/1952	No. 18	Purdue; Rivlary	W 93–70	11–4 (4–3)	The Fieldhouse; Bloomington, Indiana
2/11/1952	No. 18	at Minnesota	L 61–74	11–5 (4–4)	Williams Arena; Minneapolis
2/16/1952	No. 20	at Northwestern	W 96–85	12–5 (5–4)	Patten Gymnasium; Evanston, Illinois
2/18/1952	No. 20	Illinois; Rivalry	L 70–77	12–6 (5–5)	The Fieldhouse; Bloomington, Indiana
2/23/1952		at Wisconsin	W 63–48	13–6 (6–5)	Wisconsin Field House; Madison, Wisconsin
2/25/1952		Ohio State	W 95–80	14–6 (7–5)	The Fieldhouse; Bloomington, Indiana
3/1/1952		Minnesota	W 68–52	15–6 (8–5)	The Fieldhouse; Bloomington, Indiana
3/3/1952		Michigan State	W 70–67	16–6 (9–5)	The Fieldhouse; Bloomington, Indiana
*Non-conference game. ^{#}Rankings from AP Poll. (#) Tournament seedings in parentheses.
