= 1961–62 Michigan Wolverines men's basketball team =

American college basketball season

1961–62 Michigan Wolverines men's basketball
- Conference: Big Ten Conference
- Record: 7–17 (5–9 Big Ten)
- Head coach: Dave Strack
- Assistant coaches: James Skala; Tom Jorgensen
- Captain: John Hall
- Home arena: Yost Field House

1961–62 Big Ten Conference men's basketball standings
	Conf.				Overall
Team	W		L	PCT	W		L	PCT
No. 1 Ohio State	13	–	1	.929	26	–	2	.929
Wisconsin	10	–	4	.714	17	–	7	.708
Purdue	9	–	5	.643	17	–	7	.708
Illinois	7	–	7	.500	15	–	8	.652
Indiana	7	–	7	.500	13	–	11	.542
Iowa	7	–	7	.500	13	–	11	.542
Minnesota	6	–	8	.429	10	–	14	.417
Michigan	5	–	9	.357	7	–	17	.292
Michigan State	3	–	11	.214	8	–	14	.364
Northwestern	3	–	11	.214	8	–	15	.348
Rankings from AP Poll

The 1961–62 Michigan Wolverines men's basketball team represented the University of Michigan in intercollegiate basketball during the 1961–62 season. The team finished the season in eighth place in the Big Ten Conference with an overall record of 7–17 and 5–9 against conference opponents.

Dave Strack was in his second year as the team's head coach. Tom Cole was the team's leading scorer with 361 points in 24 games for an average of 15.0 points per game. Cole also led the team with 223 rebounds.

== Statistical leaders ==
Player	Pos.	Yr	G	FG	FT	RB	Pts	PPG
Tom Cole			24	127-335	107-138	223	361	15.0
John Oosterbaan			23	137-295	65-92	174	339	14.7
John Harris			24	107-296	76-104	209	290	12.0
Bob Cantrell			20	109-297	23-32	77	241	12.0
Jon Hall			24	74-227	74-126	85	222	9.2
Doug Herner			23	43-123	11-29	26	97	4.2
Bob Brown			18	32-58	7-23	123	71	4.4
Totals			24	657-1737	382-574	1084	1696	70.6

== See also ==
- 1962 in Michigan
