= 1958–59 Eastern Michigan Hurons men's basketball team =

American college basketball season

1958–59 Eastern Michigan Eagles men's basketball

Flint Christmas Tournament Champions
- Conference: Interstate Intercollegiate Athletic Conference
- Record: 8–13 (3–9 IIAC)
- Head coach: James Skala (5th season)
- Assistant coach: D. Janks
- Home arena: Bowen Field House

The 1958–59 Eastern Michigan Hurons men's basketball team represented Eastern Michigan University, in the 1958–59 NCAA University Division men's basketball season. The team finished with a record of 8–13 and 3–9 in the Interstate Intercollegiate Athletic Conference. The team was the Flint Christmas Tournament champions. The team was led by fifth year head coach James Skala.

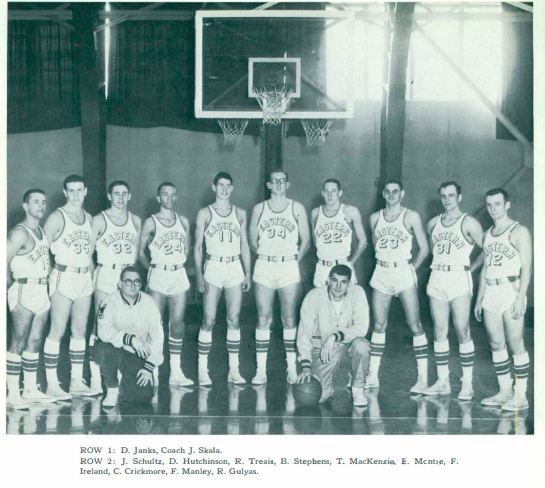
1958-59 Eastern Michigan Basketball team picture

== Roster ==
Number	Name	Class	Hometown
11	Tom MacKenzie		
12	Ronald Gulyas		
15	Jim Schultz	Senior	Detroit, MI
22	F. Ireland		
23	Charles Crickmore		
24	Bill Stephens	Junior	
31	Frank Manley		
32	Rod Treais	Junior	
34	E. Mcntre		
35	D. Hutchinson		

== Schedule ==
Date time, TV	Opponent	Result	Record	Site (attendance) city, state
Non-conference regular season
December 3, 1958*	at Baldwin Wallace	W 70–66	1–0	Rudolph Ursprung Gymnasium; Berea, OH
December 6, 1958*	Youngstown State	L 62–71	1–1	Bowen Field House; Ypsilanti, MI
December 12, 1958	Northern Illinois	L 57–66	1–2 (0–1)	Bowen Field House; Ypsilanti, MI
December 16, 1958	at Central Michigan	L 48–54	1–3 (0–2)	Finch Fieldhouse; Mount Pleasant, MI
December 17, 1958*	at Hillsdale	L 58–65	1–4	Stock Field House; Hillsdale, MI
December 22, 1958*	vs. Aquinas; Flint Christmas Tournament	W 80–71	2–4	Flint, MI
December 23, 1958*	at Flint Community Junior College; Flint Christmas Tournament	W 76–72	3–4	Flint, MI
January 5, 1959*	at Albion	W 65–63	4–4	Kresge Gymnasium; Albion, MI
January 7, 1959*	Hillsdale	L 55–56	4–5	Bowen Field House; Ypsilanti, MI
January 10, 1959	at Northern Illinois	L 72–93	4–6 (0–3)	Chick Evans Field House; DeKalb, IL
January 16, 1959	Southern Illinois	L 77–87	4–7 (0–4)	Bowen Field House; Ypsilanti, MI
January 17, 1959	Eastern Illinois	W 79–65	5–7 (1–4)	Bowen Field House; Ypsilanti, MI
January 20, 1959*	at Albion	W 60–55	6–7	Bowen Field House; Ypsilanti, MI
January 23, 1959	at Western Illinois	L 87–95 ^{OT}	6–8 (1–5)	Macomb, IL
January 24, 1959	at Illinois State	L 64–67	6–9 (1–6)	Horton Field House; Normal, IL
February 13, 1959	Central Michigan	W 81–69	7–9 (2–6)	Bowen Field House; Ypsilanti, MI
February 17, 1959*	Baldwin-Wallace	L 81–84	7–10	Bowen Field House; Ypsilanti, MI
February 20, 1959	at Southern Illinois	L 53–106	7–11 (2–7)	Davies Gym; Carbondale, IL
February 21, 1959	at Eastern Illinois	L 59–91	7–12 (2–8)	Health Education Building; Charleston, IL
February 27, 1959	Western Illinois	W 74–73	8–12 (2–8)	Bowen Field House; Ypsilanti, MI
February 28, 1959	Illinois State	L 60–76	8–13 (2–9)	Bowen Field House; Ypsilanti, MI
*Non-conference game. (#) Tournament seedings in parentheses. All times are in Eastern Time.
