= 1961–62 Indiana Hoosiers men's basketball team =

American college basketball season

1961–62 Indiana Hoosiers men's basketball
- Conference: Big Ten Conference
- Record: 13–11 (7–7 Big Ten)
- Head coach: Branch McCracken (21st season)
- Assistant coaches: Lou Watson; Don Luft
- Captain: Charley Hall
- Home arena: New Fieldhouse

1961–62 Big Ten Conference men's basketball standings
	Conf.				Overall
Team	W		L	PCT	W		L	PCT
No. 1 Ohio State	13	–	1	.929	26	–	2	.929
Wisconsin	10	–	4	.714	17	–	7	.708
Purdue	9	–	5	.643	17	–	7	.708
Illinois	7	–	7	.500	15	–	8	.652
Indiana	7	–	7	.500	13	–	11	.542
Iowa	7	–	7	.500	13	–	11	.542
Minnesota	6	–	8	.429	10	–	14	.417
Michigan	5	–	9	.357	7	–	17	.292
Michigan State	3	–	11	.214	8	–	14	.364
Northwestern	3	–	11	.214	8	–	15	.348
Rankings from AP Poll

The 1961–62 Indiana Hoosiers men's basketball team represented Indiana University. Their head coach was Branch McCracken, who was in his 21st year. The team played its home games in New Fieldhouse in Bloomington, Indiana, and was a member of the Big Ten Conference.

The Hoosiers finished the regular season with an overall record of 13–11 and a conference record of 7–7, finishing 4th in the Big Ten Conference. Indiana was not invited to participate in any postseason tournament.

== Roster ==
No.	Name	Position	Ht.	Year	Hometown
20	Dave Granger	F	6–7	Jr.	Hillsdale, Michigan
21	Dave Holland	F	6–5	So.	Toledo, Indiana
22	Jimmy Rayl	G	6–2	Jr.	Kokomo, Indiana
23	Jerry Bass	G	5–9	Sr.	Morristown, Indiana
25	Charley Roush	F	6–1	Jr.	Columbus, Indiana
30	Gordon Mickey	F	6–7	Sr.	Chillicothe, Ohio
31	Dick Sparks	C	6–5	So.	Bloomington, Indiana
31	Jim Sutton	G	5–11	So.	Anderson, Indiana
32	Ernie Wilhoit	G	6–3	Sr.	Collinsville, Illinois
33	Winston Fairfield	C	6–9	Jr.	Wilmington, Massachusetts
41	Frank Daly	F	6–2	So.	Mooresville, Indiana
42	Charley Hall	F	6–6	Sr.	Terre Haute, Indiana
43	Dave Porter	F	6–4	Jr.	Noblesville, Indiana
45	Tom Bolyard	F	6–4	Jr.	Fort Wayne, Indiana

== Schedule/results ==
Date time, TV	Rank^{#}	Opponent^{#}	Result	Record	Site city, state
Regular season
12/2/1961*		Drake	L 81–90	0–1	Veterans Memorial Auditorium; Des Moines, IA
12/7/1961*		New Mexico State	W 74–68	1–1	New Fieldhouse; Bloomington, IN
12/9/1961*		Kansas State	L 78–88	1–2	New Fieldhouse; Bloomington, IN
12/11/1961*		vs. North Carolina	W 76–70	2–2	Greensboro Coliseum; Greensboro, NC
12/16/1961*		Detroit	W 92–84	3–2	New Fieldhouse; Bloomington, IN
12/18/1961*		Arizona State	W 94–88	4–2	New Fieldhouse; Bloomington, IN
12/23/1961*		at Iowa State	L 70–83	4–3	Iowa State Armory; Ames, Iowa
12/30/1961*		at Loyola (Chicago)	L 90–95	4–4	Alumni Gym; Chicago, IL
1/2/1962*		vs. Notre Dame	W 122–95	5–4	Memorial Coliseum; Fort Wayne, IN
1/6/1962		Michigan State	W 76–71	6–4 (1–0)	New Fieldhouse; Bloomington, IN
1/8/1962		at Minnesota	L 100–104	6–5 (1–1)	Williams Arena; Minneapolis, MN
1/13/1962*		at DePaul	W 98–89	7–5 (1–1)	Alumni Hall; Chicago, IL
1/27/1962		Minnesota	W 105–104	8–5 (2–1)	New Fieldhouse; Bloomington, IN
1/29/1962		at Northwestern	W 72–71	9–5 (3–1)	Welsh-Ryan Arena; Evanston, IL
2/3/1962		at No. 4 Illinois; Rivalry	L 85–96	9–6 (3–2)	Huff Hall; Champaign, IL
2/10/1962		at Purdue; Rivalry	L 93–105	9–7 (3–3)	Lambert Fieldhouse; West Lafayette, IN
2/12/1962		Wisconsin	L 94–105	9–8 (3–4)	New Fieldhouse; Bloomington, IN
2/17/1962		Iowa	W 72–69	10–8 (4–4)	New Fieldhouse; Bloomington, IN
2/19/1962		Michigan	W 86–77	11–8 (5–4)	New Fieldhouse; Bloomington, IN
2/24/1962		at Michigan State	L 85–97	11–9 (5–5)	Jenison Fieldhouse; East Lansing, MI
2/26/1962		at Michigan	L 89–110	11–10 (5–6)	Yost Field House; Ann Arbor, MI
3/3/1962		Purdue; Rivalry	W 88–71	12–10 (6–6)	New Fieldhouse; Bloomington, IN
3/5/1962		Illinois; Rivalry	W 104–92	13–10 (7–6)	New Fieldhouse; Bloomington, IN
3/10/1962		at No. 1 Ohio State	L 65–90	13–11 (7–7)	St. John Arena; Columbus, OH
*Non-conference game. ^{#}Rankings from AP Poll. (#) Tournament seedings in parentheses.
