= 1951–52 Wisconsin Badgers men's basketball team =

American college basketball season

1951–52 Wisconsin Badgers men's basketball
- Conference: Big Ten Conference
- Record: 10–12 (5–9 Big Ten)
- Head coach: Harold E. Foster
- Home arena: UW Fieldhouse

1951–52 Big Ten Conference men's basketball standings
	Conf.				Overall
Team	W		L	PCT	W		L	PCT
No. 2 Illinois	12	–	2	.857	22	–	4	.846
No. 7 Iowa	11	–	3	.786	19	–	3	.864
Minnesota	10	–	4	.714	15	–	7	.682
Indiana	9	–	5	.643	16	–	6	.727
Michigan State	6	–	8	.429	13	–	9	.591
Ohio State	6	–	8	.429	8	–	14	.364
Wisconsin	5	–	9	.357	10	–	12	.455
Michigan	4	–	10	.286	7	–	15	.318
Northwestern	4	–	10	.286	7	–	15	.318
Purdue	3	–	11	.214	8	–	14	.364
Rankings from AP Poll

The 1951–52 Wisconsin Badgers men's basketball team represented University of Wisconsin–Madison. The head coach was Harold E. Foster, coaching his eighteenth season with the Badgers. The team played their home games at the UW Fieldhouse in Madison, Wisconsin and was a member of the Big Ten Conference.

== Schedule ==
Date time, TV	Rank^{#}	Opponent^{#}	Result	Record	Site city, state
Regular Season
12/01/1951*		Marquette	W 48–46	1–0	UW Fieldhouse; Madison, Wisconsin
12/08/1951*		Notre Dame	L 53–63	1–1	UW Fieldhouse; Madison, Wisconsin
12/13/1951*		Loyola (LA)	W 66–47	2–1	UW Fieldhouse; Madison, Wisconsin
12/17/1951*		Saint Louis	W 55–54	3–1	UW Fieldhouse; Madison, Wisconsin
12/22/1951*		at Marquette	L 47–51	3–2	Marquette Gymnasium; Milwaukee
12/27/1951*		vs. Oregon	W 82–77	4–2	Kezar Pavilion; San Francisco
12/28/1951*		vs. California	L 49–68	4–3	Kezar Pavilion; San Francisco
1/05/1952		Purdue	L 64–79	4–4 (0–1)	UW Fieldhouse; Madison, Wisconsin
1/07/1952		at Illinois	L 49–53	4–5 (0–2)	Huff Hall; Champaign, Illinois
1/12/1952		Ohio State	W 58–51	5–5 (1–2)	UW Fieldhouse; Madison, Wisconsin
1/19/1952		at Northwestern	W 74–58	6–5 (2–2)	Patten Gymnasium; Evanston, Illinois
1/21/1952		at Michigan State	L 39–50	6–6 (2–3)	Jenison Fieldhouse; East Lansing, Michigan
2/06/1952*		at Butler	W 62–60	7–6	Butler Fieldhouse; Indianapolis
2/09/1952		Minnesota	L 47–54	7–7 (2–4)	UW Fieldhouse; Madison, Wisconsin
2/11/1952		at Purdue	L 67–78	7–8 (2–5)	Lambert Fieldhouse; West Lafayette, Indiana
2/16/1952		Michigan State	L 55–57	7–9 (2–6)	UW Fieldhouse; Madison, Wisconsin
2/18/1952		at Michigan	L 55–56	7–10 (2–7)	Yost Field House; Ann Arbor, Michigan
2/23/1952		Indiana	L 48–63	7–11 (2–8)	UW Fieldhouse; Madison, Wisconsin
2/25/1952		Michigan	W 69–53	8–11 (3–8)	UW Fieldhouse; Madison, Wisconsin
3/01/1952		at Ohio State	L 56–69	8–12 (3–9)	Ohio Expo Center Coliseum; Columbus, Ohio
3/03/1952		at Iowa	W 78–75	9–12 (4–9)	Iowa Field House; Iowa City, IA
3/08/1952		Illinois	W 58–48	10–12 (5–9)	UW Fieldhouse; Madison, Wisconsin
*Non-conference game. ^{#}Rankings from AP Poll. (#) Tournament seedings in parentheses.
