= 1959–60 Eastern Michigan Hurons men's basketball team =

American college basketball season

1959–60 Eastern Michigan Hurons men's basketball

Flint Christmas Tournament Champions
- Conference: Interstate Intercollegiate Athletic Conference
- Record: 7–13 (1–11 IIAC)
- Head coach: James Skala (6th season)
- Assistant coach: G. Smoot
- Home arena: Bowen Field House

The 1959–60 Eastern Michigan Hurons men's basketball team represented Eastern Michigan University, in the 1959–60 NCAA College Division men's basketball season. The team finished with a record of 7–13 and 1–11 in the Interstate Intercollegiate Athletic Conference. Frank Manley was the team captain, Tom MacKenzie was the captain-elect and Rod Treais was the team MVP. The team was the Flint Christmas Tournament champions for the second year in a row. The team was led by sixth year head coach James Skala.

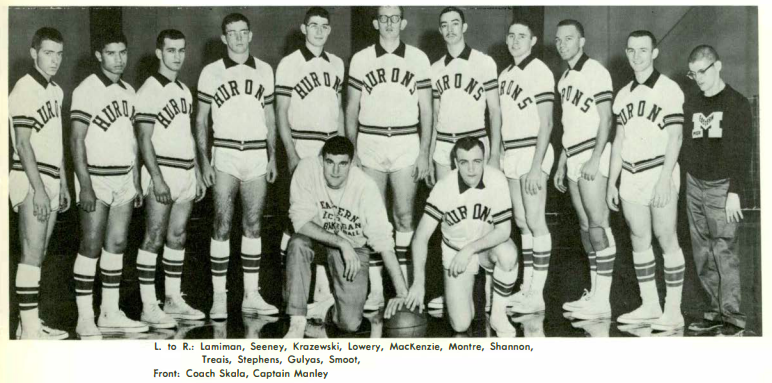
1959-60 Eastern Michigan Basketball team picture

== Roster ==
Number	Name	Position	Class	Hometown
	Tom MacKenzie	Center		Ypsilanti, MI
	Ronald Gulyas			
	D. Lamiman			
	J. Seeney			
23	Bill Stephens		Senior	
32	Rod Treais		Senior	
33	Frank Manley			
	Dick Montre		Senior	
	C. Kraszewski			
	W. Lowery			

== Schedule ==
Date time, TV	Opponent	Result	Record	Site (attendance) city, state
Non-conference regular season
December 1, 1959*	at Albion	W 71–52	1–0	Kresge Gymnasium; Albion, MI
December 5, 1959*	at Baldwin Wallace	L 64–77	1–1	Rudolph Ursprung Gymnasium; Berea, OH
December 11, 1959	Central Michigan	W 54–48	2–1 (1–0)	Bowen Field House; Ypsilanti, MI
December 14, 1959*	Hillsdale	W 71–64	3–1	Bowen Field House; Ypsilanti, MI
December 17, 1959	at Northern Illinois	L 69–84	3–2 (1–1)	Chick Evans Field House; DeKalb, IL
December 21, 1959*	vs. Hillsdale; Flint Christmas Tournament	W 75-62	4–2	Flint, MI
December 22, 1959*	at Flint Community Junior College; Flint Christmas Tournament	W 75–74	5–2	Flint, MI
January 8, 1960	Eastern Illinois	L 72–79	5–3 (1–2)	Bowen Field House; Ypsilanti, MI
January 9, 1960	Southern Illinois	L 76–87	5–4 (1–3)	Bowen Field House; Ypsilanti, MI
January 12, 1960*	Baldwin-Wallace	W 84-70	6–4	Bowen Field House; Ypsilanti, MI
January 15, 1960	at Illinois State	L 71-100	6–5 (1–4)	Horton Field House; Normal, IL
January 16, 1960	at Western Illinois	L 67-129	6–6 (1–5)	Macomb, IL
January 20, 1960*	Albion	W 58-46	7–6	Bowen Field House; Ypsilanti, MI
January 23, 1960	Northern Illinois	L 68-83 ^{yes}	7–7 (1–6)	Bowen Field House; Ypsilanti, MI
February 12, 1960	at Eastern Illinois	L 57-64	7–8 (1–7)	Health Education Building; Charleston, IL
February 13, 1960	at Southern Illinois	L 61-101	7–9 (1–8)	Davies Gym; Carbondale, IL
February 19, 1960	Illinois State	L 54-64	7–10 (1–9)	Bowen Field House; Ypsilanti, MI
February 20, 1960	Western Illinois	L 69-82	7–11 (1–10)	Bowen Field House; Ypsilanti, MI
February 22, 1960*	at Hillsdale	L 73-76	7–12	Stock Field House; Hillsdale, MI
February 25, 1960	Central Michigan	L 62–74	7–13 (1–11)	Finch Fieldhouse; Mount Pleasant, MI
*Non-conference game. (#) Tournament seedings in parentheses. All times are in Eastern Time.

== Game Notes ==
=== January 16, 1960 ===
129 points is the most scored in a single game for Western Illinois.

=== February 12, 1960 ===
Eastern Illinois has a score of 56-64.

=== February 22, 1960 ===
Michigan Intercollegiate Athletic Association has a score of 72-76.
