= 1961–62 Illinois Fighting Illini men's basketball team =

American college basketball season

1961–62 Illinois Fighting Illini men's basketball
- Conference: Big Ten Conference
- Record: 15-8 (7-7 Big Ten)
- Head coach: Harry Combes (15th season)
- Assistant coaches: Howie Braun (25th season); Jim Wright (4th season)
- MVP: Dave Downey
- Captain: Jerry Colangelo
- Home arena: Huff Hall

1961–62 Big Ten Conference men's basketball standings
	Conf.				Overall
Team	W		L	PCT	W		L	PCT
No. 1 Ohio State	13	–	1	.929	26	–	2	.929
Wisconsin	10	–	4	.714	17	–	7	.708
Purdue	9	–	5	.643	17	–	7	.708
Illinois	7	–	7	.500	15	–	8	.652
Indiana	7	–	7	.500	13	–	11	.542
Iowa	7	–	7	.500	13	–	11	.542
Minnesota	6	–	8	.429	10	–	14	.417
Michigan	5	–	9	.357	7	–	17	.292
Michigan State	3	–	11	.214	8	–	14	.364
Northwestern	3	–	11	.214	8	–	15	.348
Rankings from AP Poll

The 1961–62 Illinois Fighting Illini men's basketball team represented the University of Illinois.

== Regular season ==
The 1961-62 Fighting Illini basketball team bounced back from a miserable season the year prior. Head coach Harry Combes non-conference season was nearly perfect with an 8-1 record. The only blemish for the University of Illinois was a home loss to Cornell. The most unusual thing about this season was that the Illini played three neutral court games in Chicago. This would also be the final full season that the Fighting Illini would play their home games at Huff Hall.

The 1961-62 team utilized several returning lettermen including the leading scorer and team "MVP" Dave Downey. It also saw the return of team captain Jerry Colangelo, juniors Bill Burwell, Bill Small, Bob Starnes as well as senior Doug Mills. The Illini also added sophomore John Love to their lineup. The Illini finished the season with a conference record of 7 wins and 7 losses, finishing in a 4th place tie in the Big Ten. They would finish with an overall record of 15 wins and 8 losses. The starting lineup included Bill Burwell at the center position, Bill Small and Jerry Colangelo at guard and Dave Downey and Bob Starnes at the forward slots.

=== Roster ===
1961–62 Illinois Fighting Illini men's basketball team
Players
Coaches

Pos.	#	Name	Height	Weight	Year	Previous school	Hometown
F	14	John Love	6 ft 3 in (1.91 m)	190 lb (86 kg)	So	Ottawa Township High School	Ottawa, Illinois
F	20	Jerry Renner	6 ft 1 in (1.85 m)	180 lb (82 kg)	Sr	East High School	Aurora, Illinois
G	21	Sam Leeper	6 ft 0 in (1.83 m)	165 lb (75 kg)	Sr	Unity High School	Tolono, Illinois
G	22	Jay Lovelace	6 ft 2 in (1.88 m)	165 lb (75 kg)	Jr	Carbondale Community High School	Carbondale, Illinois
G	23	Jerry Colangelo (C)	6 ft 2 in (1.88 m)	175 lb (79 kg)	Sr	Bloom High School	Chicago Heights, Illinois
C	25	Bill Burwell	6 ft 8 in (2.03 m)	243 lb (110 kg)	Jr	Boys High School	Brooklyn, New York
G	30	Jeff Ferguson	6 ft 3 in (1.91 m)	180 lb (82 kg)	So	Benton Consolidated High School	Benton, Illinois
G	31	Doug Mills	6 ft 0 in (1.83 m)	165 lb (75 kg)	Sr	Galesburg High School	Galesburg, Illinois
G	32	Bill Edwards	6 ft 3 in (1.91 m)	190 lb (86 kg)	So	Windsor High School	Windsor, Illinois
F	35	Clyde Kramer	6 ft 4 in (1.93 m)	185 lb (84 kg)	So	Erie High School	Erie, Illinois
F	40	Dave Downey	6 ft 4 in (1.93 m)	195 lb (88 kg)	Jr	Canton High School	Canton, Illinois
G	41	Jerry Curless	6 ft 0 in (1.83 m)	165 lb (75 kg)	Sr	VIT High School	Table Grove, Illinois
F	44	Bob Starnes	6 ft 4 in (1.93 m)	180 lb (82 kg)	Jr	Gage Park High School	Chicago, Illinois
G	53	Bill Small	6 ft 2 in (1.88 m)	185 lb (84 kg)	Jr	West Aurora High School	Aurora, Illinois
C	54	Phil LaRussa	6 ft 6 in (1.98 m)	210 lb (95 kg)	So	Walnut High School	Walnut, Illinois

Head coach

- Harry Combes (University of Illinois) (15th year)

Assistant coach(es)

- Howie Braun (University of Illinois) (25th year)
- Jim Wright (University of Illinois) (4th year)

Legend

- (C) Team captain
- (S) Suspended
- (I) Ineligible
- (W) Walk-on
- Injured
- Current redshirt

Roster

== Schedule ==
Date time, TV	Rank^{#}	Opponent^{#}	Result	Record	Site (attendance) city, state
Non-Conference regular season
12/1/1961*		Butler	W 82-72	1-0	Huff Hall (4,960); Champaign, IL
12/9/1961*		at Oklahoma	W 72–60	2-0	McCasland Field House (3,000); Norman, OK
12/12/1961*		Creighton	W 70-61	3-0	Huff Hall (6,017); Champaign, IL
12/16/1961*; 1:30 pm		Iowa State	W 82-73	4-0	Huff Hall (6,437); Champaign, IL
12/18/1961*		Xavier	W 81-69	5-0	Huff Hall (6,717); Champaign, IL
12/23/1961*		Cornell	L 60-72	5-1	Huff Hall (5,258); Champaign, IL
12/28/1961*		vs. Manhattan	W 61-56	6-1	Chicago Stadium (3,000); Chicago, IL
12/30/1961*		vs. Colgate	W 88-50	7-1	Chicago Stadium (6,000); Chicago, IL
Big Ten regular season
1/6/1962		Michigan	W 91-71	8-1 (1-0)	Huff Hall (6,509); Champaign, IL
1/8/1962		at Purdue	L 89-96	8-2 (1-1)	Lambert Fieldhouse (6,500); West Lafayette, IN
1/13/1962		at Michigan State	W 66-65	9-2 (2-1)	Jenison Fieldhouse (7,068); East Lansing, MI
1/27/1962*		vs. Notre Dame	W 85-77	10-2	Chicago Stadium (12,224); Chicago, IL
1/29/1962		Wisconsin	L 81-85	10-3 (2-2)	Huff Hall (6,740); Champaign, IL
2/3/1962		Indiana; Rivalry	W 96-85	11-3 (3-2)	Huff Hall (6,557); Champaign, IL
2/5/1962		Minnesota	W 89-80	12-3 (4-2)	Huff Hall (5,927); Champaign, IL
2/10/1962		at Iowa; Rivalry	W 91-81	13-3 (5-2)	Iowa Field House (12,300); Iowa City, IA
2/12/1962		Northwestern; Rivalry	W 88-70	14-3 (6-2)	Huff Hall (6,673); Champaign, IL
2/17/1962		Purdue	L 88-100	14-4 (6-3)	Huff Hall (6,912); Champaign, IL
2/19/1962		at Wisconsin	L 101-103	14-5 (6-4)	Wisconsin Field House (7,399); Madison, WI
2/24/1962		at No. 1 Ohio State	L 79-102	14-6 (6-5)	St. John Arena (13,497); Columbus, OH
3/3/1962		Iowa; Rivalry	L 78-88	14-7 (6-6)	Huff Hall (6,669); Champaign, IL
3/5/1962		at Indiana; Rivalry	L 92-104	14-8 (6-7)	New Fieldhouse (5,000); Bloomington, IN
3/10/1962		at Northwestern; Rivalry	W 73–68	15-8 (7-7)	McGaw Memorial Hall (5,000); Evanston, IL
*Non-conference game. ^{#}Rankings from AP Poll. (#) Tournament seedings in parentheses. All times are in Central Time.

== Player stats ==
Player	Games played	Field goals	Free throws	Rebounds	Points
Dave Downey	22	174	97	269	445
Bill Burwell	23	151	124	266	426
Bill Small	23	133	70	90	336
Jerry Colangelo	23	111	73	95	295
Bob Starnes	23	81	58	147	220
Doug Mills	15	25	9	18	59
John Love	22	18	15	86	51
Jay Lovelace	13	4	6	10	14
Jerry Curless	10	6	2	8	14
Bill Edwards	14	5	1	9	11
Jerry Renner	5	4	2	6	10
Sam Leeper	5	0	2	3	2
Jeff Ferguson	3	0	0	2	0

== Awards and honors ==
- Dave Downey
  - Converse Honorable Mention All-American
  - Team Most Valuable Player
- Bill Burwell
  - Converse Honorable Mention All-American

== Team players drafted into the NBA ==
Player	NBA club	Round	Pick
No Player Selected			
