= 1961–62 Wisconsin Badgers men's basketball team =

American college basketball season

1961–62 Wisconsin Badgers men's basketball
- Conference: Big Ten Conference
- Record: 17–7 (10–4 Big Ten)
- Head coach: John Erickson
- Home arena: UW Fieldhouse

1961–62 Big Ten Conference men's basketball standings
	Conf.				Overall
Team	W		L	PCT	W		L	PCT
No. 1 Ohio State	13	–	1	.929	26	–	2	.929
Wisconsin	10	–	4	.714	17	–	7	.708
Purdue	9	–	5	.643	17	–	7	.708
Illinois	7	–	7	.500	15	–	8	.652
Indiana	7	–	7	.500	13	–	11	.542
Iowa	7	–	7	.500	13	–	11	.542
Minnesota	6	–	8	.429	10	–	14	.417
Michigan	5	–	9	.357	7	–	17	.292
Michigan State	3	–	11	.214	8	–	14	.364
Northwestern	3	–	11	.214	8	–	15	.348
Rankings from AP Poll

The 1961–62 Wisconsin Badgers men's basketball team represented University of Wisconsin–Madison. The head coach was John Erickson, coaching his third season with the Badgers. The team played their home games at the UW Fieldhouse in Madison, Wisconsin and was a member of the Big Ten Conference.

== Schedule ==
Date time, TV	Rank^{#}	Opponent^{#}	Result	Record	Site city, state
Regular Season
12/02/1961*		South Dakota	W 99–63	1–0	UW Fieldhouse; Madison, WI
12/04/1961*		Florida State	W 64–63	2–0	UW Fieldhouse; Madison, WI
12/09/1961*		Cincinnati	L 67–86	2–1	UW Fieldhouse; Madison, WI
12/11/1961*		Washington U. (MO)	W 91–63	3–1	UW Fieldhouse; Madison, WI
12/16/1961*		Pacific	W 92–68	4–1	UW Fieldhouse; Madison, WI
12/20/1961*		at Marquette	L 75–92	4–2	Marquette Gymnasium; Milwaukee, WI
12/26/1961*		vs. Providence; ECAC Holiday Festival	W 95–84	5–2	Madison Square Garden; New York, NY
12/28/1961*		vs. Dayton; ECAC Holiday Festival	W 105–93	6–2	Madison Square Garden; New York, NY
12/30/1961*		vs. No. 2 Cincinnati; ECAC Holiday Festival	L 71–101	6–3	Madison Square Garden; New York, NY
1/06/1962		Iowa	W 91–79	7–3 (1–0)	UW Fieldhouse; Madison, WI
1/08/1962		at Michigan State	W 83–78	8–3 (2–0)	Jenison Fieldhouse; East Lansing, MI
1/23/1962*		North Dakota State	W 102–50	9–3	UW Fieldhouse; Madison, WI
1/27/1962		Purdue	W 89–86	10–3 (3–0)	UW Fieldhouse; Madison, WI
1/29/1962		at Illinois	W 85–81	11–3 (4–0)	Huff Hall; Champaign, IL
2/03/1962		at Minnesota	W 94–88	12–3 (5–0)	Williams Arena; Minneapolis, MN
2/05/1962		Michigan	L 74–81	12–4 (5–1)	UW Fieldhouse; Madison, WI
2/10/1962		Michigan State	W 77–72	13–4 (6–1)	UW Fieldhouse; Madison, WI
2/12/1962		at Indiana	W 105–94	14–4 (7–1)	New Fieldhouse; Bloomington, IN
2/17/1962		at Michigan	L 65–84	14–5 (7–2)	Yost Field House; Ann Arbor, MI
2/19/1962		Illinois	W 103–101	15–5 (8–2)	UW Fieldhouse; Madison, WI
2/24/1962		at Northwestern	W 65–64	16–5 (9–2)	Welsh-Ryan Arena; Evanston, IL
2/26/1962		Minnesota	L 90–92	16–6 (9–3)	UW Fieldhouse; Madison, WI
3/03/1962		No. 1 Ohio State	W 86–67	17–6 (10–3)	UW Fieldhouse; Madison, WI
3/10/1962		at Iowa	L 64–81	17–7 (10–4)	Iowa Field House; Iowa City, IA
*Non-conference game. ^{#}Rankings from AP Poll. (#) Tournament seedings in parentheses.
