= Mark Workman =

American basketball player (1930–1983)

Personal information
- Born: March 10, 1930 Logan, West Virginia, U.S.
- Died: December 21, 1983 (aged 53) Bradenton, Florida, U.S.
- Listed height: 6 ft 9 in (2.06 m)
- Listed weight: 215 lb (98 kg)

Career information
- High school: Charleston (Charleston, West Virginia)
- College: West Virginia (1949–1952)
- NBA draft: 1952: 1st round, 1st overall pick
- Drafted by: Milwaukee Hawks
- Playing career: 1952–1954
- Position: Center
- Number: 12, 24

Career history
- 1952: Milwaukee Hawks
- 1952–1953: Philadelphia Warriors
- 1953–1954: Baltimore Bullets

Career highlights
- Consensus second-team All-American (1952); Third-team All-American – AP, Look (1951)

Career NBA statistics
- Points: 386 (4.9 ppg)
- Rebounds: 230 (2.9 rpg)
- Assists: 44 (0.6 apg)
- Stats at NBA.com
- Stats at Basketball Reference

Mark Cecil Workman (born March 10, 1930 – December 21, 1983) was an American professional basketball player from Charleston, West Virginia. He played collegiately at West Virginia University. Workman was the first overall pick in the 1952 NBA draft, by the Milwaukee Hawks.

== Early life ==
Born in Logan, West Virginia, Workman moved from Logan to Charleston, West Virginia, in 10th grade, leading the Charleston High School Mountain Lions to the state title as a junior. Workman averaged 32.8 points per game as a senior in 1948. He scored 63 points in a sectional tournament game that season.

Workman (1952) and Hot Rod Hundley (1957 NBA draft) are the only No. 1 overall draft picks to come from the same high School.

He also lettered in track, specializing in shot put, javelin, and discus. Upon graduation some local car dealers gave him a Chrysler New Yorker in order make the drive to Morgantown, becoming the first automobile in the Workman family.

== College career ==
After graduating from Charleston High School, Workman was recruited to West Virginia University by the legendary coach Lee Patton. Patton died from the effects of a car crash before Workman's playing days began. Under Robert N. "Red" Brown, Workman led the Mountaineers from 1950 to 1952, scoring 1,469 career points (21.0 point-per-game average).

Workman averaged 26.1 points a game in 1950–1951. In 1951–1952, he averaged 23.1 points and 17.5 rebounds for the 23–4 Mountaineers. Workman was a 1952 NCAA Men's Basketball All-Americans, alongside Naismith Basketball Hall of Fame inductees Cliff Hagan, Clyde Lovellette and Bob Pettit, as well as major league baseball All-Star Dick Groat.

His top scoring performance was 50 points against Salem College in 1951. He also scored 48 points against Washington and Jefferson College, and 44 points against George Washington University. He still holds the WVU single-game records for field goals (22), free throws (17), and points in a half (37), along with four of the top 10 scoring marks.

One of Workman's greatest accomplishments was winning the United States Basketball Writers Association Gold Star Award as the outstanding visiting player in the state of New York for the 1951–52 season for leading WVU to wins over New York University (100–75) and Niagara University (74–71), despite the New York press having labelled him "the Galloping Goon from West Virginia" the previous year.

Workman also competed in Track and Field at West Virginia. He once beat future Olympic Champion Bob Mathias in the javelin. “Mark Workman was a very good athlete — not a goon as some people thought,” said Eddie Barrett, who was the WVU Sports Information Director at the time. “He also competed in varsity track and field.”

== Professional career ==
Workman was the first overall pick in the 1952 NBA draft, selected by the Milwaukee Hawks, but went on a tour of Europe with the Harlem Globetrotters before playing two years for the NBA Philadelphia Warriors and Baltimore Bullets.

In 1952–1953, Workman played five games for Milwaukee and was traded on November 19, 1952, to the Philadelphia Warriors for Don Sunderlage. He averaged 5.3 points in 60 games for Philadelphia. In 1953–54, Workman played in 14 games for the Warriors, averaging 4.0 points and 3.6 rebounds.

== Personal life ==
After retiring from basketball, Workman became a salesman, bringing bowling to the Orient as a representative of the Brunswick Corporation. He later moved to Florida where he worked as a salesman for a mining company while enjoying his true love of fishing.

== Death ==
Workman died at his home on December 21, 1983, after a long illness. He was survived by his wife, Jane.

== Honors ==
Workman was inducted into the West Virginia Sports Writers Hall of Fame in 1974.

In 1994, Workman was inducted into the West Virginia University Sports Hall of Fame.

In 2017, Workman was named an inaugural member of West Virginia University's Mountaineer Legends Society.

== Career statistics ==
Legend
GP	Games played	GS	Games started	MPG	Minutes per game
FG%	Field goal percentage	3P%	3-point field goal percentage	FT%	Free throw percentage
RPG	Rebounds per game	APG	Assists per game	SPG	Steals per game
BPG	Blocks per game	PPG	Points per game	**Bold**	Career high

=== NBA ===
==== Regular season ====
Year	Team	GP	MPG	FG%	FT%	RPG	APG	PPG
1952–53	Milwaukee	5	5.8	.294	.500	1.2	.2	2.2
1952–53	Philadelphia	**60**	**16.7**	.320	**.622**	**3.1**	**.6**	**5.3**
1953–54	Baltimore	14	10.8	**.417**	.600	2.6	.5	4.0
Career		79	14.9	.331	.618	2.9	.6	4.9
