= Rod Fletcher (basketball) =

American basketball player

Personal information
- Born: January 5, 1930 Champaign, Illinois, U.S.
- Died: December 22, 2017 (aged 87) Anaheim, California, U.S.
- Listed height: 6 ft 4 in (1.93 m)
- Listed weight: 194 lb (88 kg)

Career information
- High school: Champaign (Champaign, Illinois)
- College: Illinois (1949–1952)
- NBA draft: 1952: – round, –
- Drafted by: Minneapolis Lakers
- Position: Guard
- Number: 37

Career highlights
- Consensus first-team All-American (1952); First-team All-Big Ten (1952); Second-team All-Big Ten (1951)
- Stats at Basketball Reference

Rodney Adams Fletcher was an American basketball player for the University of Illinois at Urbana–Champaign who was named a consensus first-team All-American as a senior in 1951–52. A 6 ft 4 in (1.93 m) guard, Fletcher led the Fighting Illini to two straight Big Ten Conference championships as well as two consecutive NCAA tournament Final Four appearances in 1951 and 1952 alongside teammate John "Red" Kerr. He was a two-time All-Big Ten selection in his three varsity seasons, and at the end of his collegiate career Fletcher was selected by the Minneapolis Lakers in the 1952 NBA draft, although he never played professionally.

Fletcher grew up in Champaign, Illinois and attended Champaign Central High School, where he was named second team all-state as a senior in 1948 by the Champaign News Gazette.

== See also ==
- 1950–51 Illinois Fighting Illini men's basketball team
- 1951–52 Illinois Fighting Illini men's basketball team
