= 1961–62 Iowa Hawkeyes men's basketball team =

American college basketball season

1961–62 Iowa Hawkeyes men's basketball
- Conference: Big Ten Conference
- Record: 13–11 (7–7 Big Ten)
- Head coach: Sharm Scheuerman (4th season)
- Assistant coaches: Dick Schultz (2nd season); Bob King (2nd season)
- MVP: Don Nelson
- Home arena: Iowa Field House (Capacity: 13,365)

1961–62 Big Ten Conference men's basketball standings
	Conf.				Overall
Team	W		L	PCT	W		L	PCT
No. 1 Ohio State	13	–	1	.929	26	–	2	.929
Wisconsin	10	–	4	.714	17	–	7	.708
Purdue	9	–	5	.643	17	–	7	.708
Illinois	7	–	7	.500	15	–	8	.652
Indiana	7	–	7	.500	13	–	11	.542
Iowa	7	–	7	.500	13	–	11	.542
Minnesota	6	–	8	.429	10	–	14	.417
Michigan	5	–	9	.357	7	–	17	.292
Michigan State	3	–	11	.214	8	–	14	.364
Northwestern	3	–	11	.214	8	–	15	.348
Rankings from AP Poll

The 1961–62 Iowa Hawkeyes men's basketball team represented the University of Iowa in intercollegiate basketball during the 1961–62 season. The team was led by head coach Sharm Scheuerman and played their home games at the Iowa Field House. The Hawkeyes finished the season 13–11 and were 7–7 in Big Ten conference games.

== Roster ==
1961–62 Iowa Hawkeyes men's basketball team
Players
Coaches

Pos.	#	Name	Height	Weight	Year	Hometown
F	11	Matt Szykowny	—	—	Jr
		Jimmy Rodgers	6 ft 3 in (1.91 m)	180 lb (82 kg)	So	Franklin Park, Illinois
C	15	Don Nelson	6 ft 6 in (1.98 m)	205 lb (93 kg)	Sr	Rock Island, Illinois
G	25	Andy Hankins	6 ft 0 in (1.83 m)	184 lb (83 kg)	So	Waukegan, Illinois
G	42	Joel Novak	6 ft 0 in (1.83 m)	180 lb (82 kg)	Sr	Rock Island, Illinois
G	43	Gary Lorenz	6 ft 2 in (1.88 m)	—	Sr
G	44	Joe Reddington	—	—	Jr
F	45	Dick Shaw	—	—	Jr
F		Jerry Messick	6 ft 8 in (2.03 m)	—

Head coach

- Sharm Scheuerman (Iowa)

Assistant coach(es)

Legend

- (C) Team captain
- (S) Suspended
- (I) Ineligible
- (W) Walk-on
- Injured
- Current redshirt

== Schedule/results ==
Date time, TV	Rank^{#}	Opponent^{#}	Result	Record	Site (attendance) city, state
Non-conference Regular Season
Dec 2, 1961*		at Evansville	L 59–65	0–1	Roberts Municipal Stadium; Evansville, Indiana
Dec 9, 1961*		Miami (OH)	W 75–55	1–1	Iowa Field House; Iowa City, Iowa
Dec 11, 1961*		South Dakota State	W 69–52	2–1	Iowa Field House; Iowa City, Iowa
Dec 16, 1961*		at Saint Louis	L 61–79	2–2	Kiel Auditorium; St. Louis, Missouri
Dec 18, 1961*		Cal State Los Angeles	W 82–72	3–2	Iowa Field House; Iowa City, Iowa
Dec 21, 1961*		Nevada	W 88–46	4–2	Iowa Field House; Iowa City, Iowa
Dec 26, 1961*		vs. Penn State; Quaker City Tournament	W 67–48	5–2	The Palestra; Philadelphia, Pennsylvania
Dec 28, 1961*		at Pennsylvania; Quaker City Tournament	W 72–64	6–2	The Palestra; Philadelphia, Pennsylvania
Dec 30, 1961*		at Villanova; Quaker City Tournament	L 56–69	6–3	The Palestra; Philadelphia, Pennsylvania
Big Ten Regular Season
Jan 6, 1962		at Wisconsin	L 79–91	6–4 (0–1)	Wisconsin Field House; Madison, Wisconsin
Jan 8, 1962*		Northwestern	W 74–69	7–4 (1–1)	Iowa Field House; Iowa City, Iowa
Jan 13, 1962*		Minnesota	W 65–63	8–4 (2–1)	Iowa Field House; Iowa City, Iowa
Jan 15, 1962		at Michigan	L 55–56	8–5 (2–2)	Yost Field House; Ann Arbor, Michigan
Jan 20, 1962		at Northwestern	W 72–60	9–5 (3–2)	Welsh-Ryan Arena; Evanston, Illinois
Feb 3, 1962*		Creighton	L 67–68	9–6	Iowa Field House; Iowa City, Iowa
Feb 5, 1962		at No. 1 Ohio State	L 63–89	9–7 (3–3)	St. John Arena; Columbus, Ohio
Feb 10, 1962		Illinois	L 81–91	9–8 (3–4)	Iowa Field House; Iowa City, Iowa
Feb 12, 1962		at Purdue	L 75–82	9–9 (3–5)	Lambert Fieldhouse; West Lafayette, Indiana
Feb 17, 1962		at Indiana	L 69–72	9–10 (3–6)	New Field House; Bloomington, Indiana
Feb 19, 1962		Michigan State	W 59–51	10–10 (4–6)	Iowa Field House; Iowa City, Iowa
Feb 24, 1962		Michigan	W 68–63	11–10 (5–6)	Iowa Field House; Iowa City, Iowa
Feb 26, 1962		No. 1 Ohio State	L 62–72	11–11 (5–7)	Iowa Field House; Iowa City, Iowa
Mar 3, 1962		at Illinois	W 88–78	12–11 (6–7)	Huff Hall; Champaign, Illinois
Mar 10, 1962		Wisconsin	W 81–64	13–11 (7–7)	Iowa Field House; Iowa City, Iowa
*Non-conference game. ^{#}Rankings from AP Poll. (#) Tournament seedings in parentheses.

== Awards and honors ==
- Don Nelson – Third-Team All-American

== Team players in the 1962 NBA draft ==
Round	Pick	Player	NBA club
3	17	Don Nelson	Chicago Zephyrs
