= Milt Mead =

American track and field athlete and basketball player (1932–2000)

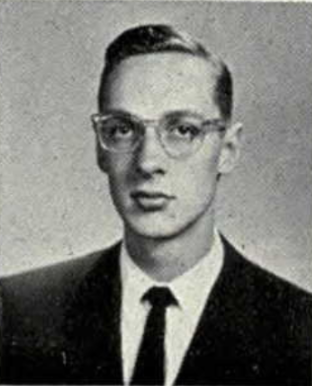
- Mead from the 1954 Michiganensian

Personal information
- Full name: Milton Mead
- Born: March 16, 1932 Bay City, Michigan, US
- Died: August 10, 2000 (aged 68) Tehachapi, California, US
- Education: University of Michigan

Sport
- Sport: Track and field athletics
- Event: High jump

Milton E. "Milt" Mead (March 16, 1932 – August 10, 2000) was an American track and field athlete and basketball player. He was a two-time All-American in the high jump, and he won the 1953 NCAA Championship in the event. He also played college basketball at the University of Michigan from 1951 to 1954 and was the second-leading scorer on the 1951–52 Michigan Wolverines men's basketball team.

== Early years ==
Mead was born in Bay City, Michigan in 1932. His parents, J. Otto Mead and Eva Mead, were both Michigan natives. At the time of the 1940 United States census, Mead was living with his parents and older brother Louis in Bay City. His father was then employed as an inspector in an automobile factory. He attended Bay City Central High School where he was a star athlete in both basketball and track and field. In 1949, he was the starting center for the basketball team and was selected as the second-team center on the All-State Team.

== University of Michigan ==
Mead enrolled at the University of Michigan in 1950. While attending Michigan, he competed in both track and field and basketball. He specialized in the high jump and, as a member of the Michigan Wolverines men's track and field team, he broke the Big Ten Conference record in the high jump. He won the 1953 NCAA Championship in the event, clearing a height of 6 feet, 8 1/4 inches. He was twice selected as an All-American and was a two-time Big Ten Conference champion in the high jump. He was inducted into the University of Michigan Track and Field Hall of Fame in 2010.

Mead also played three years with the Michigan Wolverines men's basketball team from 1951 to 1954. Mead scored 17 points in the first win of the 1951–52 season, a 58–55 victory over the University of Colorado on Christmas Eve 1951. He was the second leading scorer on the 1951–52 Michigan Wolverines men's basketball team, scoring 238 points (10.8 points per game) over the course of the season. He appeared in 66 games for the Michigan basketball team from 1951 to 1954, scoring a total of 592 points. He received a bachelor's degree in sociology in 1954.

== Later years ==
In his later years, Mead lived in Tehachapi, California. He died there in August 2000.
