= Sharm Scheuerman =

American basketball player and coach (1934–2010)

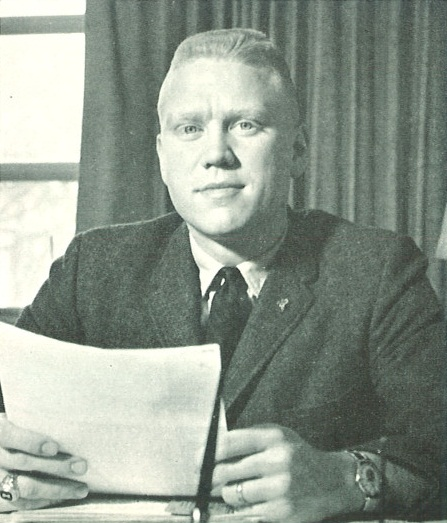

Biographical details
- Born: May 16, 1934; Moline, Illinois, U.S.
- Died: August 30, 2010 (aged 76); Denver, Colorado, U.S.

Playing career
- 1953–1956: Iowa
- Position: Guard

Coaching career (HC unless noted)
- 1956–1958: Iowa (assistant)
- 1958–1964: Iowa

Head coaching record
- Overall: 72–69

Accomplishments and honors

Awards
- No. 46 retired by Iowa Hawkeyes

Milton "Sharm" Scheuerman (May 16, 1934 – August 30, 2010) was an American college basketball player and coach for the University of Iowa.

Scheuerman was born in Moline, Illinois, and grew up in Rock Island, one of the Quad Cities. He was born to Milton Scheuerman and Lois Anderson. He had one younger brother Thomas. After a strong high school basketball career at Rock Island High School, Scheuerman chose to play college basketball for coach Bucky O'Connor at Iowa. There, he was started for some of the most successful teams in program history, winning two Big Ten Conference titles and advancing to the national Final Four in 1955 and 1956. The starting unit for these teams were known as the "Fabulous Five" as they started as a unit from their sophomore to their senior seasons.

== Coaching career ==
Following the close of his college career, Scheuerman was hired as an assistant coach by his mentor Bucky O'Connor, then was hired as head coach in 1958 when O'Connor was killed at the age of 44 in an automobile accident. At 24, Schuerman was the youngest head basketball coach in Big Ten history and one of the youngest in college basketball overall. In six years as the Hawkeyes' head coach, Scheuerman's teams compiled a record of 72–69. Hall of Famer Don Nelson was recruited to Iowa by Scheuerman, as was Hall of Famer Connie Hawkins. Nelson, also from Rock Island High School, left Iowa as the school's all-time leading scorer, before winning five NBA championships with the Boston Celtics and then retiring as the all-time wins leader among NBA coaches. Scheuerman had Bob King on his Iowa staff from 1960 to 1962. Scheuerman resigned at Iowa coach in 1964 to enter private business.

"What I remember most about it is playing for Sharm and our relationship over 50 years and how close we were and how much I loved that man,” Nelson said in 2012 of Scheuerman. “A role model certainly, but I could never duplicate that man’s life because he was so special. I certainly tried. I’m certainly a better person just by knowing him and talking to him. But we spent a lot of time together over the last 50 years.”

Scheuerman settled in Denver, Colorado, after coaching. He died on August 30, 2010, after a long battle with cancer.

== Head coaching record ==
Record table
Season	Team	Overall	Conference	Standing	Postseason
Iowa Hawkeyes (Big Ten Conference) (1958–1964)
1958–59	Iowa	10–12	7–7	T–5th	
1959–60	Iowa	14–10	6–8	T–6th	
1960–61	Iowa	18–6	10–4	T–2nd	
1961–62	Iowa	13–11	7–7	T–4th	
1962–63	Iowa	9–15	5–9	8th	
1963–64	Iowa	8–15	3–11	9th	
Iowa:		72–69 (.511)	38–46 (.452)		
Total:		72–69 (.511)			
National champion Postseason invitational champion Conference regular season champion Conference regular season and conference tournament champion Division regular season champion Division regular season and conference tournament champion Conference tournament champion
