= Don Eaddy =

American baseball player (1934–2008)

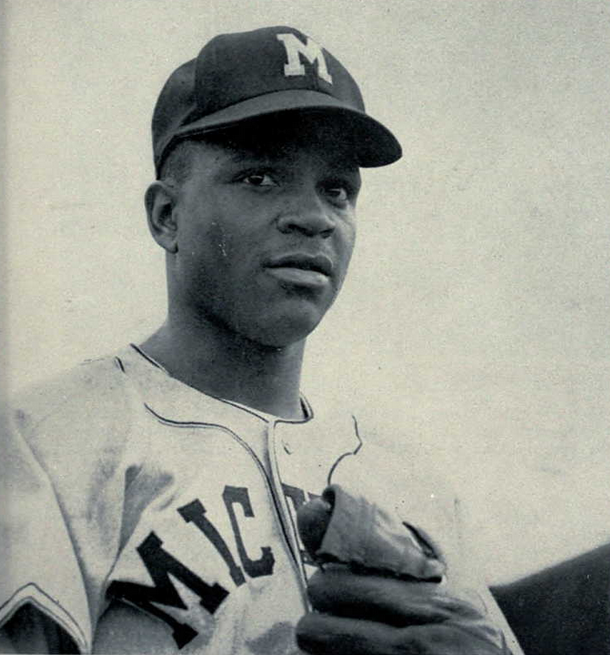
- Pinch runner / Third baseman
- Born: February 16, 1934; Grand Rapids, Michigan, U.S.
- Died: July 9, 2008 (aged 74); Laconia, New Hampshire, U.S.
- Batted: Right Threw: Right

MLB debut
- April 24, 1959, for the Chicago Cubs

Last MLB appearance
- September 25, 1959, for the Chicago Cubs

MLB statistics
- Games: 15
- At bats: 1
- Runs: 2
- Stats at Baseball Reference

Teams
- Chicago Cubs (1959)

Donald Johnson Eaddy (February 16, 1934 – July 9, 2008) was an American baseball, football, and basketball player. He played Major League Baseball for the Chicago Cubs in 1959. He played college baseball, football, and basketball at the University of Michigan from 1951 to 1955. He was an All-American in baseball and an All-Big Ten Conference selection in basketball.

== Early years ==
Eaddy was born in Grand Rapids, Michigan in 1934. He graduated from Ottawa Hill High School.

== University of Michigan ==
Eaddy attended the University of Michigan from 1951 to 1955. He was a three-sport athlete at Michigan, competing in baseball, basketball and football.

In football, Eaddy played at the halfback position in 1951. He appeared in three games for Michigan during the 1951 season, completing a pass against Michigan State for a 23-yard gain. He carried the ball nine times for the Wolverines for −49 net yards resulting from plays in which he was sacked. The halfback was the player with principal passing responsibility in the Michigan offense of the late 1940s and early 1950s. Eaddy dropped football after his freshman year. He later recalled: "First of all, I was too small to mess around with those big fellows, being a 160-pound halfback. And, secondly, I preferred to concentrate on baseball and basketball."

In basketball, he played at the guard position and was selected as an All-Big Ten Conference player.

In baseball, Eaddy was a third baseman and was selected as an All-American in 1955. He helped lead the Michigan Wolverines baseball team to the NCAA baseball championship in 1952. In 1955, he compiled a .353 batting average in Big Ten play and led the conference with 11 stolen bases in 15 games. He was the first African-American player to appear in the College World Series.

After receiving his bachelor's degree, Eaddy returned to Michigan in the fall of 1955 to pursue a master's degree in education.

== Professional baseball ==
After graduating from Michigan, Eaddy signed to play professional baseball with the Chicago Cubs. He explained his choice as follows: "I thought I would have a better chance to reach the major leagues sooner with them, because they are not loaded with material."

Eaddy played in the minor leagues for Burlington Bees in the Illinois–Indiana–Iowa League in 1955. He compiled a .304 batting average in 32 games with three doubles and three triples. In a March 1956 feature story about Eaddy in The Sporting News, Chicago coach Ray Blades predicted great things for Eaddy:

"I've seen him for only a couple of weeks now and I know that he has less than a years's experience in professional ball. However, I can promise you at this early stage of his career that this young fellow is destined to be a big leaguer. He just can't miss."

Blades added that Eaddy was already "a big leaguer on defense", and the only question was with his hitting. Eaddy was assigned to the Des Moines Bruins in the Western League in 1956. In 41 games with Des Moines, he hit .390.

After a fast start with Des Moines in 1956, Eaddy's career was interrupted when he was drafted to serve in the United States Air Force. He missed most of the 1956 season and the entire 1957 and 1958 seasons to military service.

After completing his military service, Eaddy returned to the Chicago Cubs organization. He made his major league debut with the Cubs as a pinch runner on April 24, 1959, and appeared in 15 games during the 1959 season. He was used principally as a pinch runner, and his only appearance as a position player in the major leagues was on August 1, 1959, as a third baseman. He replaced Art Schult in the bottom of the fifth inning, committed an error in the bottom of the sixth that allowed a run to score, and struck out in the top of the seventh inning. Despite striking out in his only at bat, he scored three runs for the Cubs.

Eaddy spent most of the 1959 season playing in the minor leagues for the Lancaster Red Roses of the Eastern League and the Fort Worth Cats of the American Association. Eaddy continued to play minor league baseball for another five years, but did not return to the major leagues. He had his best minor league season in 1960 at Lancaster, batting .304 in 457 plate appearances with a .425 on-base percentage, 17 doubles, eight triples, eight home runs, 33 RBIs and nine stolen bases.

Eaddy also played in Cuba during the winter of 1960 for the Cienfuegos. He led the Cuban league in bases on balls and helped lead the Cienfuegos to the 1960 Caribbean Series title.

== Later years ==
After retiring from baseball, Eaddy became a franchisee for the Burger King restaurant chain. He was inducted into the Grand Rapids Sports Hall of Fame in 1996. In July 2008, he died of cancer in Laconia, New Hampshire at age 74.
