= Chuck Darling =

American basketball player (1930–2021)

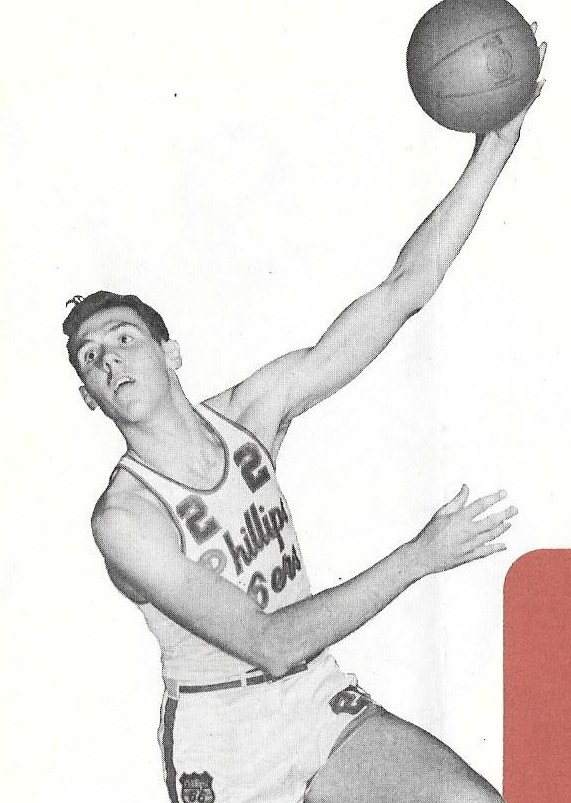
- Darling with the Phillips 66ers

Personal information
- Born: March 20, 1930 Denison, Iowa, U.S.
- Died: April 6, 2021 (aged 91) Littleton, Colorado, U.S.
- Listed height: 6 ft 8 in (2.03 m)
- Listed weight: 225 lb (102 kg)

Career information
- High school: Helena (Helena, Montana); South (Denver, Colorado)
- College: Iowa (1949–1952)
- NBA draft: 1952: 1st round, 8th overall pick
- Drafted by: Rochester Royals
- Position: Center
- Number: 27

Career highlights
- 3x AAU All-American (1954–1956); Consensus first-team All-American (1952); Chicago Tribune Silver Basketball (1952); First-team All-Big Ten (1952); Second-team All-Big Ten (1951)
- Stats at Basketball Reference
Medals
Men's basketball
Representing United States
Gold medal – first place	1956 Melbourne	Team competition

A fictional character named Chuck Darling was in the comedy series Back to You.

Charles Frick Darling (March 20, 1930 – April 6, 2021) was an American basketball player who competed in the 1956 Summer Olympics. Born in Denison, Iowa, Darling played collegiately at the University of Iowa. He was selected by the Rochester Royals in the first round of the 1952 NBA draft, but chose not to pursue a career in professional basketball. Instead, he was a member of the American basketball team that won the Olympic gold medal in 1956. He was a member of the Des Moines Register's Iowa Sports Hall of Fame. He died in Littleton, Colorado at the age of 91.
