= 1952 NCAA Men's Basketball All-Americans =

- Awarded for: 1951–52 NCAA men's basketball season

The consensus 1952 College Basketball All-American team, as determined by aggregating the results of five major All-American teams. To earn "consensus" status, a player must win honors from a majority of the following teams: the Associated Press, Look Magazine, The United Press International, Collier's Magazine and the International News Service.

== 1952 Consensus All-America team ==
Consensus First Team
Player	Position	Class	Team
Chuck Darling	C	Senior	Iowa
Rod Fletcher	G	Senior	Illinois
Dick Groat	G	Senior	Duke
Cliff Hagan	F	Junior	Kentucky
Clyde Lovellette	C	Senior	Kansas

Consensus Second Team
Player	Position	Class	Team
Bob Houbregs	F	Junior	Washington
Don Meineke	F	Senior	Dayton
Johnny O'Brien	G	Junior	Seattle
Mark Workman	C	Senior	West Virginia
Bob Zawoluk	F	Senior	St. John's

== Individual All-America teams ==
All-America Team
All-America Team	First team		Second team		Third team	
All-America Team	Player	School	Player	School	Player	School
Associated Press	Chuck Darling	Iowa	Rod Fletcher	Illinois	Larry Hennessy	Villanova
Associated Press	Dick Groat	Duke	Don Meineke	Dayton	Dick Knostman	Kansas State
Associated Press	Cliff Hagan	Kentucky	Bob Pettit	Louisiana State	Bob Houbregs	Washington
Associated Press	Clyde Lovellette	Kansas	Frank Ramsey	Kentucky	Johnny O'Brien	Seattle
Associated Press	Mark Workman	West Virginia	Bob Zawoluk	St. John's	Ray Steiner	Saint Louis
UPI	Chuck Darling	Iowa	Rod Fletcher	Illinois	Walter Dukes	Seton Hall
UPI	Dick Groat	Duke	Johnny O'Brien	Seattle	Bob Houbregs	Washington
UPI	Cliff Hagan	Kentucky	Bob Pettit	Louisiana State	Don Meineke	Dayton
UPI	Clyde Lovellette	Kansas	Frank Ramsey	Kentucky	Ray Steiner	Saint Louis
UPI	Mark Workman	West Virginia	Bob Zawoluk	St. John's	Jim Tucker	Duquesne
Look Magazine	Chuck Darling	Iowa	Bob Houbregs	Washington	No third team	
Look Magazine	Walter Dukes	Seton Hall	Clyde Lovellette	Kansas	No third team	
Look Magazine	Rod Fletcher	Illinois	Don Meineke	Dayton	No third team	
Look Magazine	Dick Groat	Duke	Albert Nicholas	Wisconsin	No third team	
Look Magazine	Mark Workman	West Virginia	Glen Smith	Utah	No third team	
International News Service	Chuck Darling	Iowa	Rod Fletcher	Illinois	No third team	
International News Service	Dick Groat	Duke	Larry Hennessy	Villanova	No third team	
International News Service	Cliff Hagan	Kentucky	Bob Houbregs	Washington	No third team	
International News Service	Clyde Lovellette	Kansas	Don Meineke	Dayton	No third team	
International News Service	Johnny O'Brien	Seattle	Jim Tucker	Duquesne	No third team	
Collier's	Chuck Darling	Iowa	Rod Fletcher	Illinois	No third team	
Collier's	Dick Groat	Duke	Larry Hennessy	Villanova	No third team	
Collier's	Cliff Hagan	Kentucky	Bob Houbregs	Washington	No third team	
Collier's	Clyde Lovellette	Kansas	Mark Workman	West Virginia	No third team	
Collier's	Glen Smith	Utah	Bob Zawoluk	St. John's	No third team	

AP Honorable Mention:

- Jesse Arnelle, Penn State
- Ernie Beck, Penn
- John Clune, Navy
- Walter Dukes, Seton Hall
- Tom Gola, La Salle
- Frank Guisness, Washington
- Don Johnson, Oklahoma A&M
- Johnny Kerr, Illinois
- Bob Lochmueller, Louisville
- Earle Markey, Holy Cross
- Carl McNulty, Purdue
- Bill Mlkvy, Temple
- Dwane Morrison, South Carolina
- Bob Sassone, St. Bonaventure
- Don Schlundt, Indiana
- Frank Selvy, Furman
- Glen Smith, Utah
- Jim Tucker, Duquesne
- Bobby Watson, Kentucky

== See also ==
- 1951–52 NCAA men's basketball season
