= James Skala =

American basketball player and coach (1930–2023)

Biographical details
- Born: September 18, 1930; Illinois, U.S.
- Died: September 24, 2023 (aged 93); Brevard, North Carolina, U.S.

Coaching career (HC unless noted)
- 1954–1960: Eastern Michigan
- 1960–1966: Michigan (assistant)

Head coaching record
- Overall: 41–90

James George "Jim" Skala (September 18, 1930 – September 24, 2023) was an American basketball player and coach. He played college basketball at the University of Michigan from 1949 to 1952 and was the captain, leading scorer, and most valuable player of the 1951–52 team. He later coached basketball at Eastern Michigan University and the University of Michigan.

== Early years ==
Skala grew up in Chicago and attended Lindblom High School.

== University of Michigan ==
Skala attended the University of Michigan. He played college basketball at Michigan from 1949 to 1952. He was the captain, leading scorer, and most valuable player for the Michigan Wolverines men's basketball team during the 1951–52 season. Skala also played football as a reserve at the end position on the 1949 and 1950 Michigan football teams.

== Coaching career and later years ==
After graduating from Michigan, Skala became the head basketball coach at Eastern Michigan University. He held that position from 1954 to 1960, compiling a 41-90 in six seasons. He then served six years as an assistant basketball coach at the University of Michigan and was responsible for recruiting Cazzie Russell to play for the Wolverines. Russell averaged 25.7 points per game and Bill Buntin 20.1 in leading Big Ten champion Michigan to the 1965 NCAA Tournament championship game against UCLA, a 91-80 loss. Skala resigned in October 1966 to accept a job with Commercial Carriers, an automotive carrier firm in Detroit.

Skala died on September 24, 2023 at the age of 93.
