= Bill Garrett Fieldhouse =

Gymnasium in Bloomington, Indiana

- Interactive map of Bill Garrett Fieldhouse
- Former names: IU Fieldhouse; Wildermuth Intramural Center
- Location: 1025 E 7th Bloomington, IN 47405
- Coordinates: 39.169203°N 86.520907°W
- Owner: Indiana University
- Operator: Indiana University
- Capacity: 8,000 (approx., former)

Construction
- Opened: December 13, 1928
- Cost: $350,000

Tenants
- Indiana Hoosiers (Intramurals - current) (Men's basketball - 1928–60)

The Bill Garrett Fieldhouse or William Leon Garrett Fieldhouse (formerly known as simply the Fieldhouse) is a gymnasium at Indiana University in Bloomington, Indiana. It was the former home of the Indiana Hoosiers men's basketball team.

== History ==
The Fieldhouse was built near the Men's Gymnasium for the Indiana Hoosiers men's basketball team. It was first used for the 1928–29 season. The first game at the facility was held on December 8, 1928, when the Hoosiers lost 31–30 to the Washington Bears. Branch McCracken scored the first point in the facility, with a free throw.

The Fieldhouse hosted two national championships and four conference titles. It was the home of 20 All-Americans. The final game was played on February 29, 1960.

In 2010, a women's locker room was added and the men's and faculty/staff locker rooms were renovated. In 2012, the facility underwent repairs following damage from a fire.

The sports facility had been formerly named "Wildermuth Intramural Center" after Ora Wildermuth, a former university trustee who held "extraordinarily strong opposition to racial integration". The trustees had approved a recommendation to honor Bill Garrett, the "first black basketball player to regularly play in the Big Ten conference", by renaming the facility to "William L. Garrett-Ora L. Wildermuth Intramural Center" on February 20, 2009. However, the school announced four days later that it would not implement the change due to lack of support from Garrett's family. Eventually, in 2018, Wildermuth's name was stripped from the facility, and the trustees renamed the facility "Intramural Center".

The facility was renamed to honor former IU All-American Bill Garrett in 2020.
