= Lambert Fieldhouse =

Athletic facility on the campus of Purdue University in West Lafayette, IN

Coordinates: 40.432298°N 86.915937°W

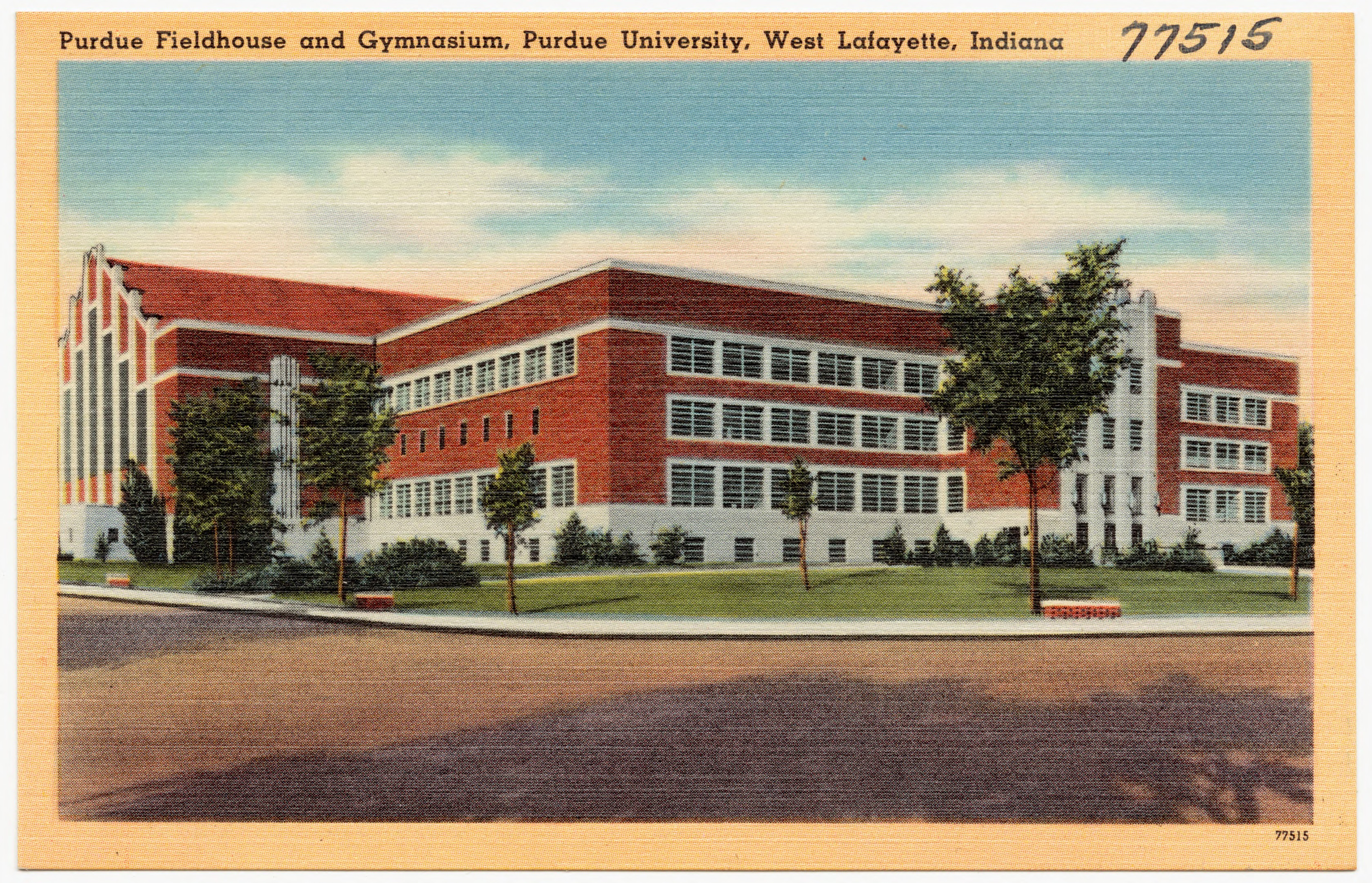
- Interactive map of Lambert Fieldhouse
- Former names: Purdue Fieldhouse
- Location: Stadium Dr; West Lafayette, IN
- Owner: Purdue University
- Operator: Purdue University
- Capacity: 1,000 (current); 7,500-10,000 (original)

Construction
- Opened: December 12, 1937

Tenants
- Purdue Boilermakers men's basketball (1937-1967); Purdue Boilermakers (Indoor Track & Field)

Lambert Fieldhouse is an athletic facility on the campus of Purdue University in West Lafayette, Indiana. It was built in 1937 on land bought by David Ross and George Ade (the namesakes of nearby Ross–Ade Stadium) as a replacement for Memorial Gymnasium to be the home of the Purdue basketball team, and also contained an indoor track. Memorial Gym was a 2,000 seat facility built in 1910 which had outgrown its usefulness, as the team had even resorted to playing games at the local high school gym, which seated twice as many as the gym did. In 1967, the team moved into the newly built Mackey Arena next door, and the building was remodeled to become a full-time track facility. The building also contains pool facilities, which were in use by the swimming and diving teams until 2001, when the Boilermaker Aquatic Center was completed.

The basement of the facility is used by the crew team for indoor training during winter months. In 2006, the pool was filled in and now the wrestling team has their practice area where the pool used to be.

The building was originally named Purdue Fieldhouse. It was renamed in honor of longtime basketball coach Ward "Piggy" Lambert on March 3, 1971, at the same board of trustees meeting in which Purdue Arena was named after Guy "Red" Mackey. It originally housed 7,500 with the ability to expand to 10,000.

Lambert Fieldhouse is also home to the department of Health and Kinesiology in the College of Health and Human Sciences. The main office, as well as offices of most professors, graduate students, and a computer lab for HK students are all housed in Lambert. Many HK classes are held in Lambert, but because there is no large lecture hall, those are held in nearby buildings, typically Physics and Electrical Engineering. The academic portion of the building lacks handicapped accessibility to most offices, classrooms, and laboratories and possesses an antiquated heating/cooling system that results in stifling work conditions during summer months. While efforts have been made in recent years to renovate portions of the building used by the intercollegiate athletic program (new track surface in 2005, conversion of the pool into a facility for the wrestling team in the same timeframe), little has been done to address these problems in the academic facility.

The A.H. Ismail center was previously also housed in Lambert Fieldhouse, before being relocated to Lyles-Porter Hall. The Ismail center is a small fitness facility for Purdue Faculty, Staff, and retirees. There is a membership fee for the Ismail Center, and while it is higher than a membership at the Recreational Sports Center, the only students in the facility are volunteers or staff members from the Department of Health and Kinesiology and Nutrition Science. The Ismail Center has come under internal criticism for financial non-viability.
