= 1962 in Michigan =

- Decades: 1940s; 1950s; 1960s; 1970s; 1980s
- See also: History of Michigan; Historical outline of Michigan; List of years in Michigan; 1962 in the United States

This article reviews 1962 in Michigan, including the state's office holders, population trends, largest public companies, performance of sports teams, a chronology of the state's top news and sports stories, and notable Michigan-related births and deaths.

== Top stories ==
The Associated Press selected the top news stories of 1962 in Michigan as follows:

1. George W. Romney's successful campaign to become Governor of Michigan (AP-1);
2. The end of the Michigan Constitutional Convention (AP-2);
3. The January 30 tragedy in which the Wallenda family, performing a high wire pyramid in front of 7,000 spectators at the Shrine Circus at Detroit's State Fair Coliseum, sustained two deaths and three other injuries when their human pyramid collapsed (AP-3);
4. Record profits and sales in the automobile business (AP-4);
5. Completion of the Sault Ste. Marie International Bridge connecting the twin cities of Sault Ste. Marie, Michigan and Sault Ste. Marie, Ontario (AP-5);
6. The defeat of proposed tax reform in the Michigan Legislature (AP-6);
7. An order by the Michigan Supreme Court directing reapportionment (AP-7)
8. The sinking of the freighter Montrose in the Detroit River after colliding with a barge (AP-8);
9. The dedication of Michigan's first atomic reactor at the Big Rock Point Nuclear Power Plant (AP-9); and
10. John F. Kennedy and members of his Cabinet making numerous campaign visits to Michigan in September to campaign for Democratic candidates (AP-10).
11. The Ford Rotunda fire in November (AP-11).

The year's sports highlights in Michigan included the Detroit Lions compiling an 11–3 record with the Fearsome Foursome defensive front, the Michigan Wolverines baseball team's victory in the 1962 College World Series, the 1961–62 Michigan Tech Huskies men's ice hockey team winning the national championship, and Gordie Howe scoring his 500th goal for the Detroit Red Wings.

The year's highlights in Michigan music included a week of sold-out performances by the Metropolitan Opera at the Detroit Masonic Temple and the development of Motown with hits such as Do You Love Me by The Contours, You've Really Got a Hold on Me by The Miracles, Playboy by The Marvelettes, and Two Lovers by Mary Wells.

== Office holders ==
=== State office holders ===
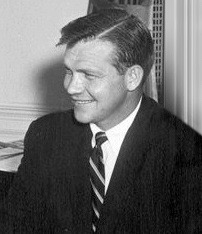
John Swainson

- Governor of Michigan: John Swainson (Democrat)
- Lieutenant Governor of Michigan: T. John Lesinski (Democrat)
- Michigan Attorney General: Frank J. Kelley (Democrat)
- Michigan Secretary of State: James M. Hare (Democrat)
- Speaker of the Michigan House of Representatives: Don R. Pears (Republican)
- Majority Leader of the Michigan Senate: Frank D. Beadle (Republican)
- Chief Justice, Michigan Supreme Court: John R. Dethmers (Republican)/Leland W. Carr (Democrat)

=== Mayors of major cities ===
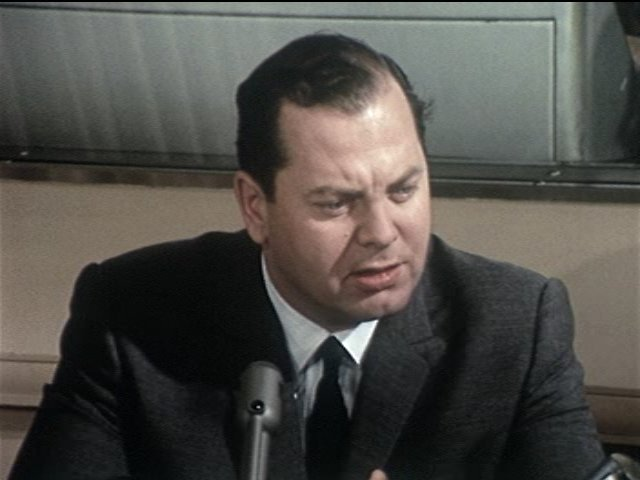
Jerome Cavanagh

- Mayor of Detroit: Jerome Cavanagh
- Mayor of Grand Rapids: Stanley J. Davis
- Mayor of Warren, Michigan: Ted Bates
- Mayor of Flint: Charles A. Mobley/George R. Poulos
- Mayor of Dearborn: Orville L. Hubbard
- Mayor of Lansing: Willard I. Bowerman, Jr. (Republican)
- Mayor of Ann Arbor: Cecil Creal (Republican)

=== Federal office holders ===
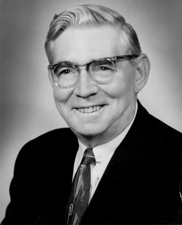
Patrick McNamara

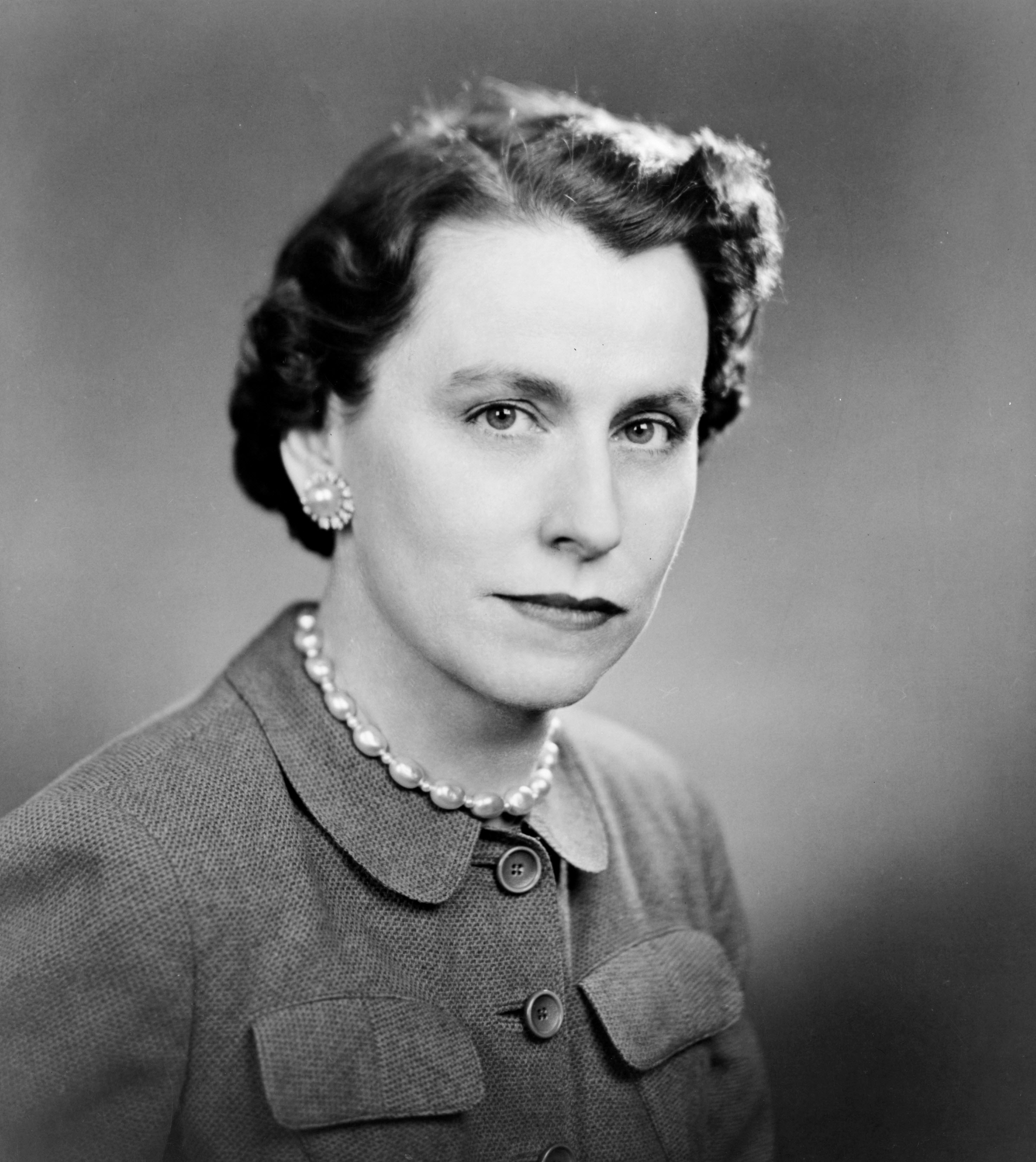
Martha Griffiths

- United States Senator from Michigan: Philip Hart (Democrat)
- United States Senator from Michigan: Patrick V. McNamara (Democrat)
- United States Representative, District 1: Lucien N. Nedzi (Democrat)
- United States Representative, District 2: George Meader (Republican)
- United States Representative, District 3: August E. Johansen (Republican)
- United States Representative, District 4: Clare Hoffman (Republican)
- United States Representative, District 5: Gerald Ford (Republican)
- United States Representative, District 6: Charles E. Chamberlain (Republican)
- United States Representative, District 7: James G. O'Hara (Democrat)
- United States Representative, District 8: R. James Harvey (Republican)
- United States Representative, District 9: Robert P. Griffin (Republican)
- United States Representative, District 10: Elford Albin Cederberg (Republican)
- United States Representative, District 11: Victor A. Knox (Republican)
- United States Representative, District 12: John B. Bennett (Republican)
- United States Representative, District 13: Charles Diggs (Democrat)
- United States Representative, District 14: Harold M. Ryan (Democrat)
- United States Representative, District 15: John Dingell (Democrat)
- United States Representative, District 16: John Lesinski Jr. (Democrat)
- United States Representative, District 17: Martha Griffiths (Democrat)
- United States Representative, District 18: William Broomfield (Republican)

== Population ==
In the 1960 United States census, Michigan was recorded as having a population of 7,823,194 persons, ranking as the seventh most populous state in the country. By 1970, the state's population had grown 13.4% to 8,875,083 persons.

=== Cities ===
The following is a list of cities in Michigan with a population of at least 60,000 based on 1960 U.S. Census data. Historic census data from 1950 and 1970 is included to reflect trends in population increases or decreases. Cities that are part of the Detroit metropolitan area are shaded in tan.

1960 Rank	City	County	1950 Pop.	1960 Pop.	1970 Pop.	Change 1960-70
1	Detroit	Wayne	1,849,568	1,670,144	1,514,063	−9.3% ▼
2	Flint	Genesee	163,143	196,940	193,317	−1.8% ▼
3	Grand Rapids	Kent	176,515	177,313	197,649	11.5% ▲
4	Dearborn	Wayne	94,994	112,007	104,199	−7.0% ▼
5	Lansing	Ingham	92,129	107,807	131,403	21.9% ▲
6	Saginaw	Saginaw	92,918	98,265	91,849	−6.5% ▼
7	Warren	Macomb	42,653	89,246	179,260	100.2% ▲
8	Pontiac	Oakland	73,681	82,233	85,279	3.7% ▲
9	Kalamazoo	Kalamazoo	57,704	82,089	85,555	4.1% ▲
10	Royal Oak	Oakland	46,898	80,612	86,238	7.0% ▲
11	St. Clair Shores	Macomb	19,823	76,657	88,093	14.9% ▲
12	Ann Arbor	Washtenaw	48,251	67,340	100,035	48.6% ▲
13	Livonia	Wayne	17,634	66,702	110,109	65.1% ▲
14	Dearborn Heights	Wayne	20,235	61,118	80,069	31.0% ▲
15	Westland	Wayne	30,407	60,743	86,749	42.8% ▲

=== Counties ===
The following is a list of counties in Michigan with populations of at least 100,000 based on 1960 U.S. Census data. Historic census data from 1950 and 1970 are included to reflect trends in population increases or decreases. Counties that are part of the Detroit metropolitan area are shaded in tan.

1960 Rank	County	Largest city	1950 Pop.	1960 Pop.	1970 Pop.	Change 1960-70
1	Wayne	Detroit	2,435,235	2,666,297	2,666,751	0.0% ▲
2	Oakland	Pontiac	396,001	690,259	907,871	31.5% ▲
3	Macomb	Warren	184,961	405,804	625,309	54.1% ▲
4	Genesee	Flint	270,963	374,313	444,341	18.7% ▲
5	Kent	Grand Rapids	288,292	363,187	411,044	13.2% ▲
6	Ingham	Lansing	172,941	211,296	261,039	23.5% ▲
7	Saginaw	Saginaw	153,515	190,752	219,743	15.2% ▲
8	Washtenaw	Ann Arbor	134,606	172,440	234,103	35.8% ▲
9	Kalamazoo	Kalamazoo	126,707	169,712	201,550	18.8% ▲
10	Berrien	Benton Harbor	115,702	149,865	163,875	9.3% ▲
11	Calhoun	Battle Creek	120,813	138,858	141,963	2.2% ▲
12	Jackson	Jackson	108,168	131,994	143,274	8.5% ▲
13	Muskegon	Muskegon	121,545	129,943	157,426	21.2% ▲
14	St. Clair	Port Huron	91,599	107,201	120,175	12.1% ▲
15	Bay	Bay City	88,461	107,042	117,339	9.6% ▲
16	Monroe	Monroe	75,666	101,120	118,479	17.2% ▲

== Sports ==
=== Baseball ===
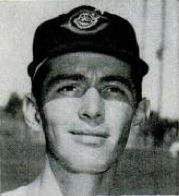
Hank Aguirre

- 1962 Detroit Tigers season – The Tigers compiled an 85–76 record and finished in a tie for third place in the American League under manager Bob Scheffing. The team's statistical leaders included Norm Cash (39 home runs), Rocky Colavito (112 RBIs), Al Kaline (.304 batting average), and Jim Bunning (19 wins). Hank Aguirre led the American League with a 2.21 earned run average.
- 1962 Michigan Wolverines baseball team - Under head coach Don Lund, the Wolverines compiled a 31–15 record and won the national championship, defeating Santa Clara in the finals. Ed Hood was the team captain. Other notable players included pitcher Dave Roebuck and center fielder Dennis Spalla.

=== American football ===
- 1962 Detroit Lions season – The Lions compiled an 11–3 record, finished in second place in the NFC Western Conference, and defeated the Pittsburgh Steelers in the Playoff Bowl. The defense, which ranked second in the NFL in scoring defense, included the Fearsome Foursome, a defensive front of Roger Brown, Alex Karras, Darris McCord, and Sam Williams. Night Train Lane, Joe Schmidt, and Yale Lary, all of whom were later inducted into the Pro Football Hall of Fame, also played for the defensive unit.
- 1962 Michigan State Spartans football team – The Spartans compiled a 5–4 record under head coach Duffy Daugherty and finished in a tie for fifth in the Big Ten Conference. Halfback George Saimes was a consensus first-team selection for the 1962 College Football All-America Team.
- 1962 Michigan Wolverines football team – The Wolverines compiled a 2–7 record under head coach Bump Elliott and finished last in the Big Ten.
- 1962 Detroit Titans football team – The Titans compiled a 1–8 record under head coach John Idzik.
- 1962 Central Michigan Chippewas football team – The Chippewas compiled a 6–4 record under head coach Kenneth "Bill" Kelly.
- 1962 Eastern Michigan Hurons football team – The Hurons compiled a 2–5 record under head coach Fred Trosko.
- 1962 Western Michigan Broncos football team – The Broncos compiled a 5–4 record under head coach Merle Schlosser and finished fourth in the Mid-American Conference.

=== Basketball ===
- 1961–62 Detroit Pistons season – The Pistons compiled a 37–43 record under head coach Dick McGuire while playing their first season at Cobo Arena. They lost to the Los Angeles Lakers in the West Division Finals. Gene Shue led the team with 465 assists and Bailey Howell led with 1,576 points.
- 1961–62 Detroit Titans men's basketball team – The Titans compiled a 15–11 record under head coach Bob Calihan. Led by Dave DeBusschere, the Titans advanced to the NCAA basketball tournament. Despite 38 points from DeBusschere, the Titans lost in the first round to Western Kentucky.
- 1961–62 Michigan Wolverines men's basketball team – The Wolverines compiled a 7–17 record under head coach Dave Strack.
- 1961–62 Michigan State Spartans men's basketball team – The Spartans compiled an 8–14 record under head coach Forddy Anderson.
- 1961–62 Western Michigan Broncos men's basketball team – The Broncos compiled a 13–11 record under head coach Don Boven.

=== Ice hockey ===
- 1961–62 Detroit Red Wings season – The Red Wings compiled a 23–33–14 record under head coach Sid Abel and finished in fifth place out of six teams in the NHL. Gordie Howe was the team's leading scorer with 77 points.
- 1961–62 Michigan Tech Huskies men's ice hockey team – The Huskies compiled a 29–3 record under head coach John MacInnes and won the 1962 NCAA Division I Men's Ice Hockey Tournament.
- 1961–62 Michigan Wolverines men's ice hockey team – The Wolverines compiled a 22–5 record under head coach Al Renfrew and finished third in the 1962 NCAA Division I Men's Ice Hockey Tournament.
- 1961–62 Michigan State Spartans men's ice hockey team – The Spartans compiled a 13–11–1 record under head coach Amo Bessone.

=== Other ===
- Buick Open – Bill Collins won the Buick Open at Warwick Hills in Grand Blanc on July 8.
- Motor City Open – Bruce Crampton won the Motor City Open at Knollwood Country Club on July 15. His four-round total of 267 was 17 under par and broke the tournament record set in 1959.
- Port Huron to Mackinac Boat Race – The Falcon II skippered by 76-year old Clare Jacobs won the race on July 16, finishing shortly after the Charley Kotovic's Gypsy but being declared the winner due to a one-hour, 20-minute handicap due to its smaller size.
- Spirit of Detroit Trophy race – Bill Muncey and his Century 21 unlimited hydroplane boat won the Spirit of Detroit Trophy race on August 26 before a crowd of more than 100,000 along the Detroit River.

== Music ==
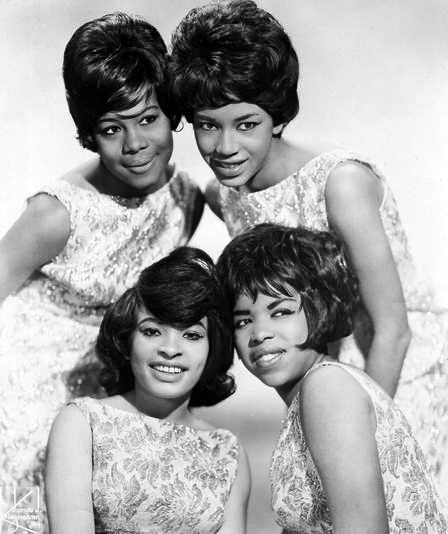
The Marvelettes

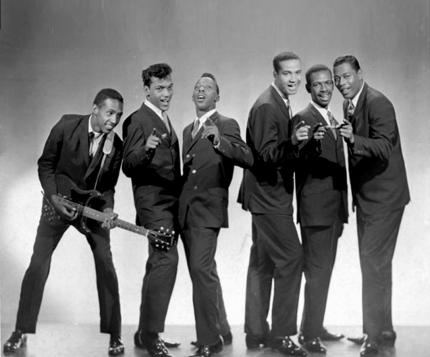
The Contours

- February – The One Who Really Loves You by Mary Wells was released on the Motown label and reached #8 on the Billboard Hot 100 chart and number #2 on the Billboard R&B chart
- March – (You're My) Dream Come True by The Temptations was released on Motown's Gordy label and became the group's first nationally charting single, peaking at #22 on the Billboard R&B chart
- April – Playboy by The Marvelettes was released on Motown's Tamla label and became the group's second top 10 hit, peaking at #7 on the Hot 100 chart and #4 on the R&B chart
- June – Do You Love Me by The Contours was released on Motown's Gordy label and reached #3 on the Hot 100 in October 1962, and was a #1 hit on the R&B chart
- July – Beechwood 4-5789 by The Marvelettes was released on the Tamla label and rose to #17 on the Hot 100 chart and #7 on the R&B chart
- September – You Beat Me to the Punch by Mary Wells was released on the Motown label and rose to #9 on the Hot 100 and #1 on the R&B chart
- October – Two Lovers by Mary Wells was released on the Motown label and reached #1 on the R&B chart and #7 on the Hot 100
- November – You've Really Got a Hold on Me by The Miracles was released on Motown's Tamla label and rose to #1 on the R&B chart and #8 on the Hot 100; it was later selected as one of The Rock and Roll Hall of Fame's 500 Songs that Shaped Rock and Roll
- December – Hitch Hike by Marvin Gaye was released on Motown's Tamla label and became the Gaye's first charting single, peaking at #30 on the Hot 100 and #12 on the R&B chart
- December 26 – The Detroit Free Press published a four-column profile of 33-year-old Berry Gordy, referring to him as "Detroit's Record King". Gordy praised the musical talent in Detroit: "The talent here is terrific and was largely untapped when we came along. And the personalities of performers here seems to basically warmer than in many other cities."
- Undated – The band ? and the Mysterians was formed with members from Bay City and Saginaw

== Companies ==
The following is a list of major companies based in Michigan in 1962.

Company	1962 Rank	Headquarters	Core business
General Motors	1	Detroit	Automobiles
Ford Motor Company	3	Dearborn	Automobiles
Chrysler	12	Highland Park	Automobiles
American Motors	49	Detroit	Automobiles
Dow Chemical Company	53	Midland	Chemicals
Bendix Corporation	59		Automotive brakes, vacuum tubes, aeronautical hydraulics and electric power systems, avionics, fuel control systems, radios, televisions and computers
Whirlpool Corporation	112	Benton Harbor	Home appliances
Clark Equipment Company	263	Buchanan	Industrial and construction machinery and equipment
Kellogg Co.	–	Battle Creek	Cereal products
Gerber Products Company	–	Fremont	Baby food
Burroughs Corporation		Detroit	Business equipment
National Bank of Detroit		Detroit	Banking
Detroit Edison		Detroit	Electric utility
Ex-Cell-O		Troy	Engine components, auto parts, machine tools
Masco		Taylor	Home improvement and construction products
S. S. Kresge Corporation		Troy	Kmart and Kresge retail stores
Monroe Auto Equipment Co.		Monroe	Auto parts
Upjohn		Kalamazoo	Pharmaceutical
Steelcase		Grand Rapids	Office, educational, and health care furniture
Consumers Power		Jackson	Natural gas utility

== Chronology of events ==
=== January ===
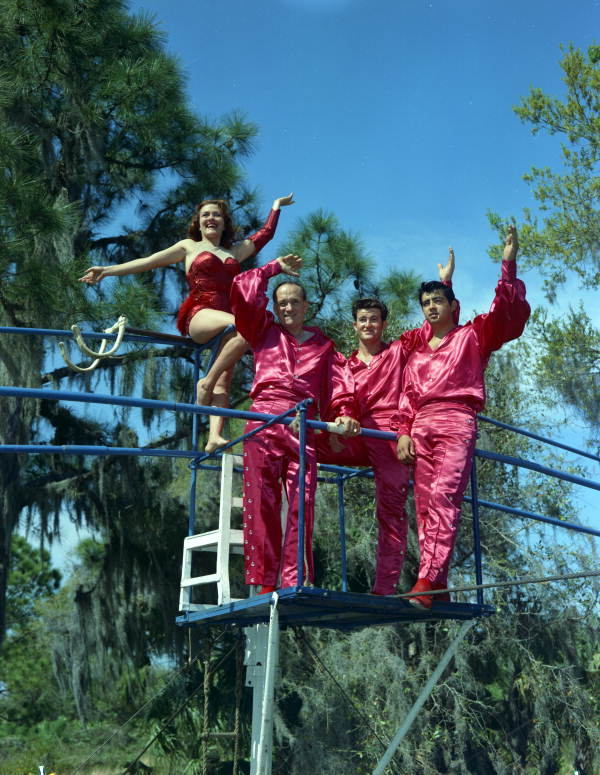
Wallenda family

- January 2 – Jerome Cavanagh, a 33 year old lawyer, was sworn in as Mayor of Detroit. Three new members of the Detroit Common Council, including Mel Ravitz and James H. Brickley, were also sworn in.
- January 9 – A blizzard dropped 24 inches of snow across the northern lower peninsula. It was the worst blizzard to hit the state in 15 years.
- January 11 – Gov. John Swainson delivered his State of the State address to the Michigan legislature, calling for increased support for higher education and mental health.
- January 22 – A federal lawsuit was filed charging Detroit with maintaining a racially segregated school system.
- January 30 – The Wallenda family, performing a high wire pyramid in front of 7,000 spectators at the Shrine Circus at Detroit's State Fair Coliseum, sustained two deaths and three other injuries when the pyramid collapsed. Karl Wallenda sustained a pelvis injury, his son-in-law and nephew both died, and his adopted son, Mario, was paralyzed from the waist down. Remaining members of the family went on with the show the next day.

=== February ===
- February – A research and development team from Michigan State University working in South Vietnam to develop the country's civil administration was asked to leave the country by the government of Ngo Dinh Diem following publication of critical articles by members of the team.

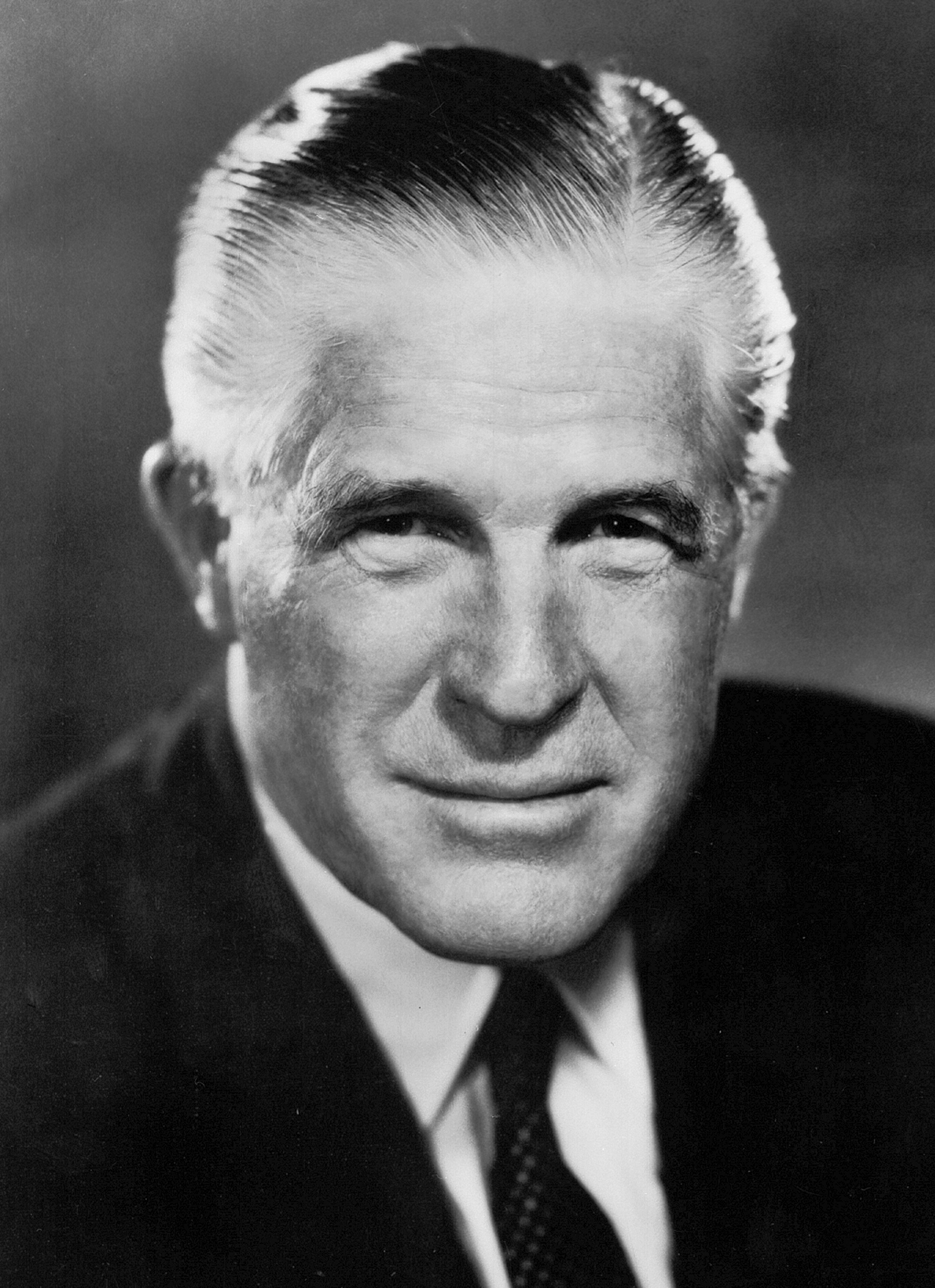
George W. Romney

- February 10 – George W. Romney declared himself a candidate for Governor. Two days later, he resigned as chairman and president of American Motors. Following criticism of Romney for his Mormon faith, Gov. John Swainson revealed that he, too, had been raised as a Mormon (later converting to the Lutheran faith) and declared: "I want to see the discussion of religion eliminated as a campaign matter."
- February 10 – Frederic Pryor, a resident of Ann Arbor, was released from an East German prison as part of a prisoner swap that also included Gary Francis Powers. On arriving in Ann Arbor, Pryor expressed his desire to resume a normal life and not have his story used for cheap propaganda.
- February 13 – Harold M. Ryan was elected to the U.S. House of Representatives from Michigan's 14th District by a margin of 764 votes over Robert E. Waldron. The special election was set following the death of Republican Congressman Louis C. Rabaut, who introduced legislation that added the words "under God" to the Pledge of Allegiance.
- February 14 – The front page of the Detroit Free Press features a story by James Reston claiming that the United States was involved in an undeclared war in South Vietnam with 4,000 Americans on the ground and an unknown number of casualties.
- February 20 – As John Glenn was launched as the first American to orbit the Earth, the Detroit Free Press reported that "a humming city halted," and a "strange stillness settled" on the city.

=== March ===
- March 10 – A 32-member citizen advisory committee presented its 349-page report with findings and recommendations regarding racial segregation in Detroit schools.
- March 12 – Detroit's Common Council approved the demolition and clearing of the city's skid row, a 59-acre area bounded by W. Lafayette, Bagley, Cass and the John C. Lodge Freeway.

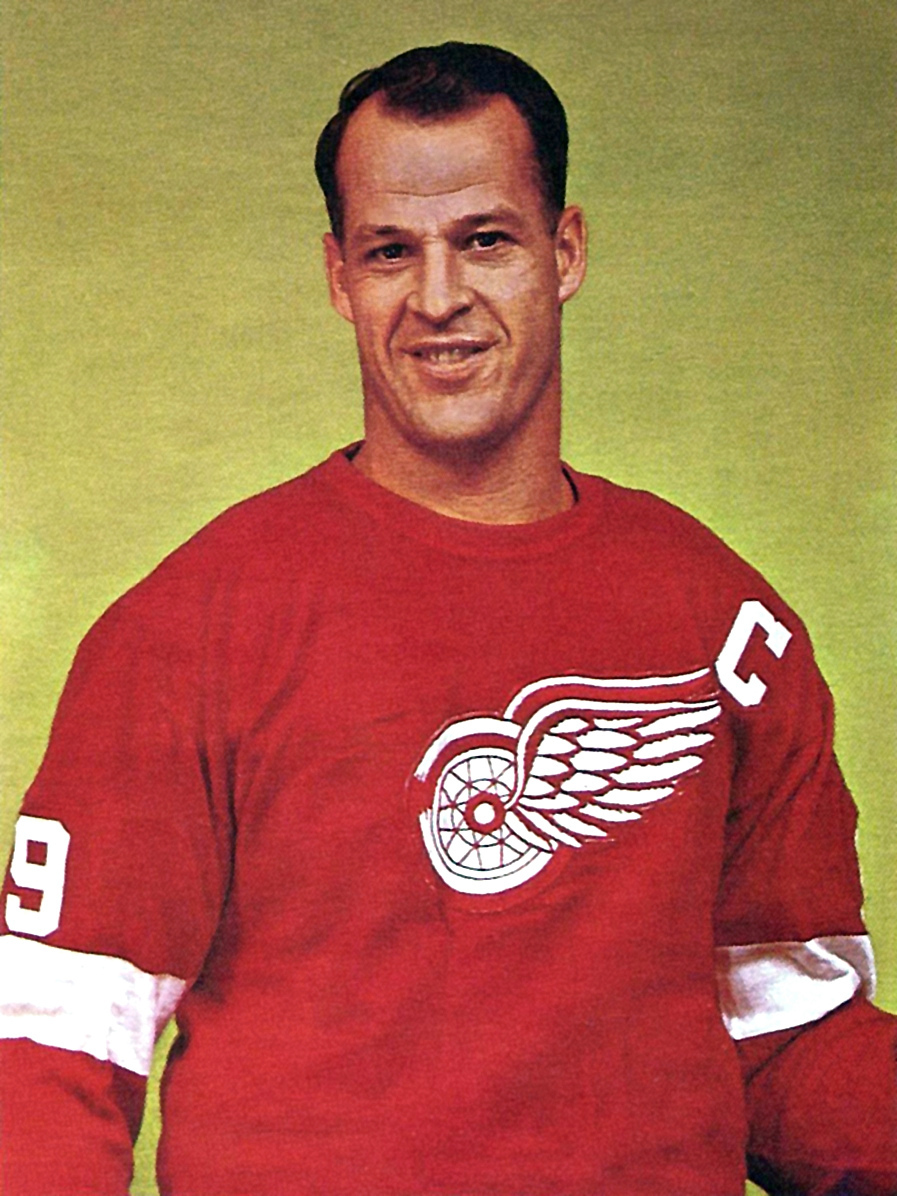
Gordie Howe

- March 14 – Gordie Howe scored the 500th goal of his career in the Detroit Red Wings' 3–2 loss to the New York Rangers.
- March 16 – The Michigan Supreme Court overturned a $400,000 jury verdict in favor Carl Renda and against the United Auto Workers (UAW). The verdict was entered on Renda's malicious prosecution claim for his 1954 arrest following the 1948 shotgun shooting of UAW President Walter Reuther.
- March 20 – The Detroit Pistons defeated the Cincinnati Royals to advance to the NBA's Western Division finals against the Los Angeles Lakers. The Pistons won the decisive fourth game in the playoff series by a 112–111 score despite 32 points scored by Oscar Robertson.
- March 24 – Following an investigation into racketeer influence in the Teamsters Union, the U.S. Senate Rackets Investigating Committee accused Teamster President Jimmy Hoffa of protecting racketeers and criminals in the union.
- March 26 – The Detroit Pistons selected Dave DeBusschere of the University of Detroit in the NBA's territorial draft. DeBusschere went on to play seven seasons for the Pistons and was an NBA All-Star nine times.
- March 27 – Federal authorities reported that raw sewage and industrial waste were polluting water in Lake St. Clair, the Detroit River and Lake Erie. The City of Dearborn's dumping of raw and inadequately treated sewage was cited as a source of concern.
- March 30 – Byron White, who had been an All-Pro halfback for the Detroit Lions in 1940, was appointed to the U.S. Supreme Court by President Kennedy.

=== April ===
- April 3 – The U.S. Army abandoned a plan to move tank manufacturing operations from the Detroit Arsenal to the Rock Island Arsenal, saving 3,000 jobs in Detroit.
- April 6 – Detroit Mayor Cavanagh unveiled his plan to initiate a one percent income tax on city residents and income earned in the city by non-residents. The plan was adopted by the city's Common Council. A bill to prohibit commuter income taxes on non-residents was passed by the Michigan legislature, but was vetoed by Gov. Swainson.
- April 6 – Air Force Maj. Milton Britton, a 39-year old from Owosso, became the first person from Michigan to be killed in the Vietnam War.
- April 9 – In their season opener, the Detroit Tigers lost to the Washington Senators in the first Major League Baseball game played at the new D.C. Stadium (later renamed Robert F. Kennedy Memorial Stadium). John F. Kennedy threw out the first pitch. Don Mossi was the Tigers' opening day starter and the losing pitcher.

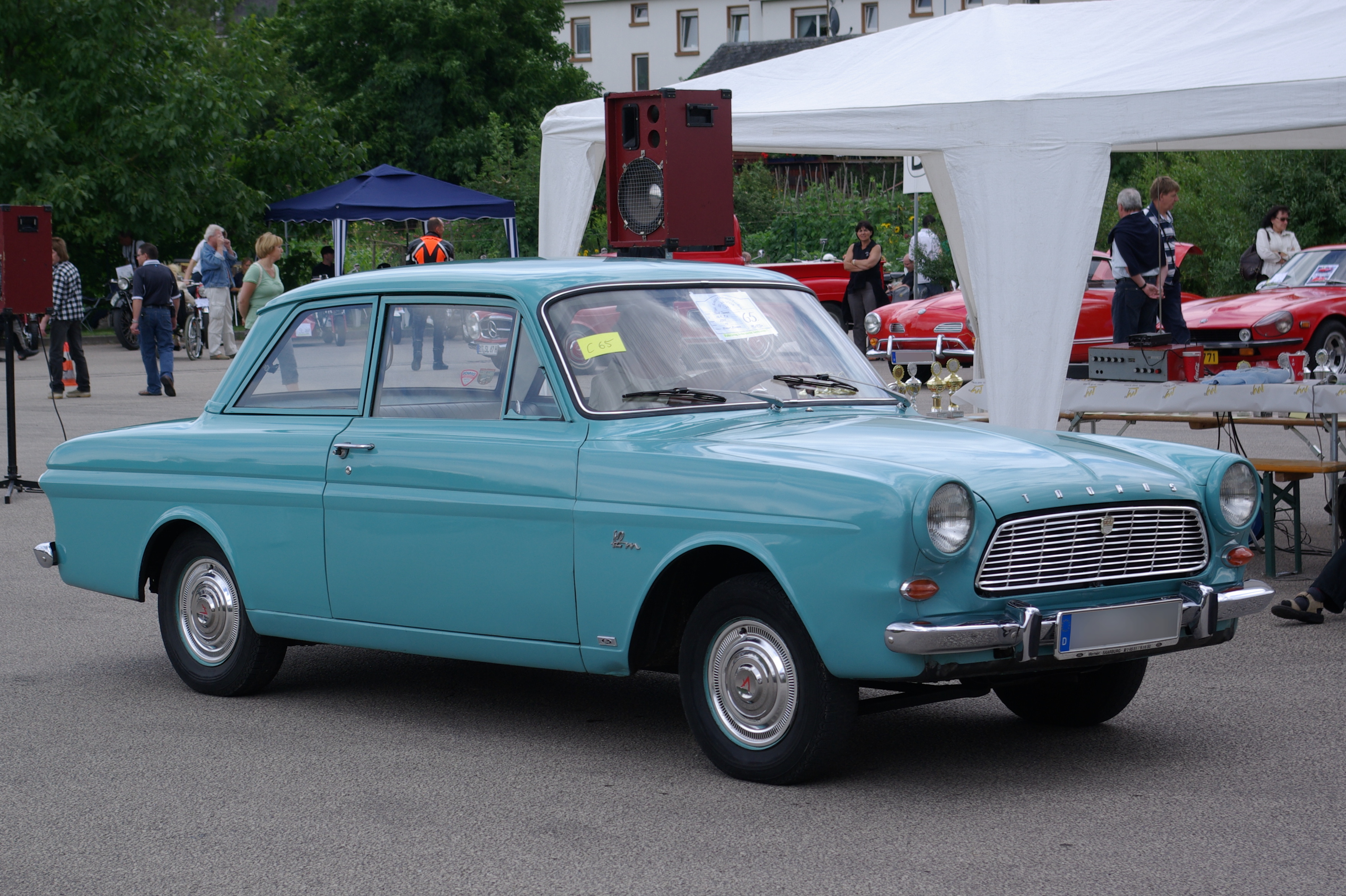
Ford Taunus P4

- April 10 – Ford Motor announced that it had abandoned its plan to produce a subcompact car called the Cardinal, though a modified version was to be manufactured and sold in Europe. The modified version was manufactured starting in 1962 in Germany as the Ford Taunus P4.
- April 11 – A strike by Jimmy Hoffa's Teamsters Union shut down both of Detroit's major newspapers, the Detroit Free Press and The Detroit News. The two papers published a single joint paper on Sunday, April 15, but the newspapers otherwise remained dark until the strike ended on May 10. The Free Press resumed publication until May 11.

=== May ===
- May 10 - Michigan's first indoor shopping mall, the Pontiac Mall (later renamed Summit Place), opened. The 60-acre development featured 42 stores that could be visited under a single roof with air conditioning in the summer and heating in the winter. The largest store was a two-level Montgomery Ward store. Other stores included a J.L. Hudson Budget Shop, Kroger's, S.S. Kresge, and Cunningham Drug. The mall had 500,000 square feet of shopping space, 120 sculptures, and parking for 4,000 cars. The Great Wallendas performed at the grand opening.

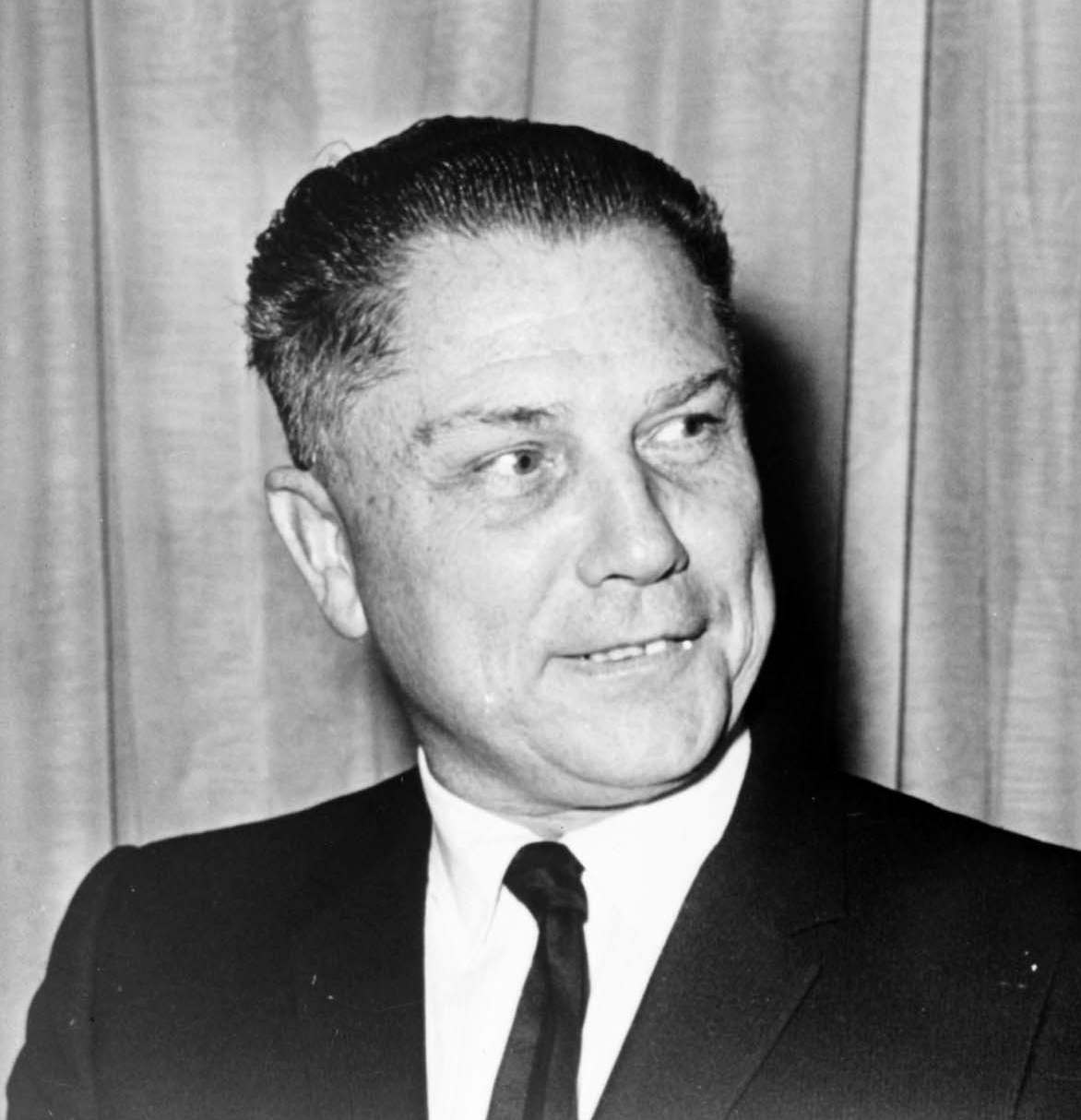
Jimmy Hoffa

- May 17 - Teamsters President Jimmy Hoffa was arrested in Washington, D.C., for allegedly beating Samuel Baron, a 59-year-old field director of the union's warehouse division, who Hoffa accused of not doing his job properly. Hoffa allegedly "went berserk" and hit Baron, knocking him to the ground, then picked him up and hit him again. The charges were dropped several weeks later due to serious conflicts in eyewitness accounts.
- May 17 - George Romney urged Richard Durant and other members of the John Birch Society, an ultra-right organization, to resign their jobs positions in the Republican Party. He said he didn't like extremists from either side of the political spectrum and added of the John Birch members, "Anyone so identified is not capable of leadership, and should be replaced." Durant resigned from the Birch Society in August and reconciled with Romney. The Romney-Durant rift resurfaced as Durant was accused of distributing Birch literature, then publicly asserted his belief in Birchism. At the state Republican convention on August 25, Romney denounced the Birch Society and Durant.
- May 18 - One day after Jimmy Hoffa's arrest for assault, U. S. Attorney General Robert F. Kennedy announced that Hoffa had been indicted by a federal grand jury on charges that he and an associate took more than $1 million in payoffs from a Detroit trucking firm between 1949 and 1958.
- May 18 - Gov. Swainson conceded that his fiscal reform plan, which included imposition of a state income tax, was dead due to opposition by Republicans in the legislature.
- May 20 - The Detroit Free Press reported that the city's cultural status was on the rise. A week of seven performances by the Metropolitan Opera at Detroit Masonic Temple sold out, and the Fisher Theater had 23,000 subscribers, making it the biggest pre-paid theater program in the country. The city's resident Vanguard theater company was also having its best season. Alvin Toffler also ranked the Detroit Symphony Orchestra among the top ten in the country.
- May 21 - The Detroit Free Press reported on a building boom in the Detroit area, with most of the construction occurring in the suburbs.
- May 22 - Wayne State University President Clarence Hilberry banned planned speeches on the campus by social justice activist Carl Braden and civil liberties activist Frank Wilkinson who was jailed for refusing to answer questions before the House Un-American Activities Committee (HUAC). The two had been scheduled to speak on HUAC.
- May 26 - Al Kaline broke his collarbone "while making a sensational, game-saving catch" against the New York Yankees. He was lost to the Tigers for two months.
- May 27 - Governor Swainson accused the Detroit Real Estate Board assessing each of its members $25 to raise funds to support a fight in favor housing discrimination, a campaign that Swainson called "an exercise in organized bigotry".
- May 28 - A strike by the Carpenters Union brought residential construction to a halt in Wayne, Oakland, Macomb, St. Clair, and Monroe Counties. The strike ended on June 4 with an agreement to a 10 cents per hour pay raise.

=== June ===
- June 1 - The Detroit Free Press reported on a split in the Wayne County Republican Party between a moderate faction and John Birch Society conservatives.
- June 1 - The U.S. Army's Mobility Command was created with its headquarters in Detroit. Maj. Gen. Alden Sibley called it "the most important peacetime military procurement activity ever centered in Detroit."
- June 4 - A Circuit Court Judge in Ingham County struck down Michigan's Rule 9 forbidding housing discrimination by real estate agents. Governor Swainson criticized the ruling, and Attorney General Frank Kelley vowed to appeal with dispatch.
- June 11 - Henry Ford II announced that Ford Motor would no longer abide by an Automobile Manufacturers Association resolution against advertising speed or horsepower of automobiles. The move was expected "to open the gates to another horsepower race by American auto makers."

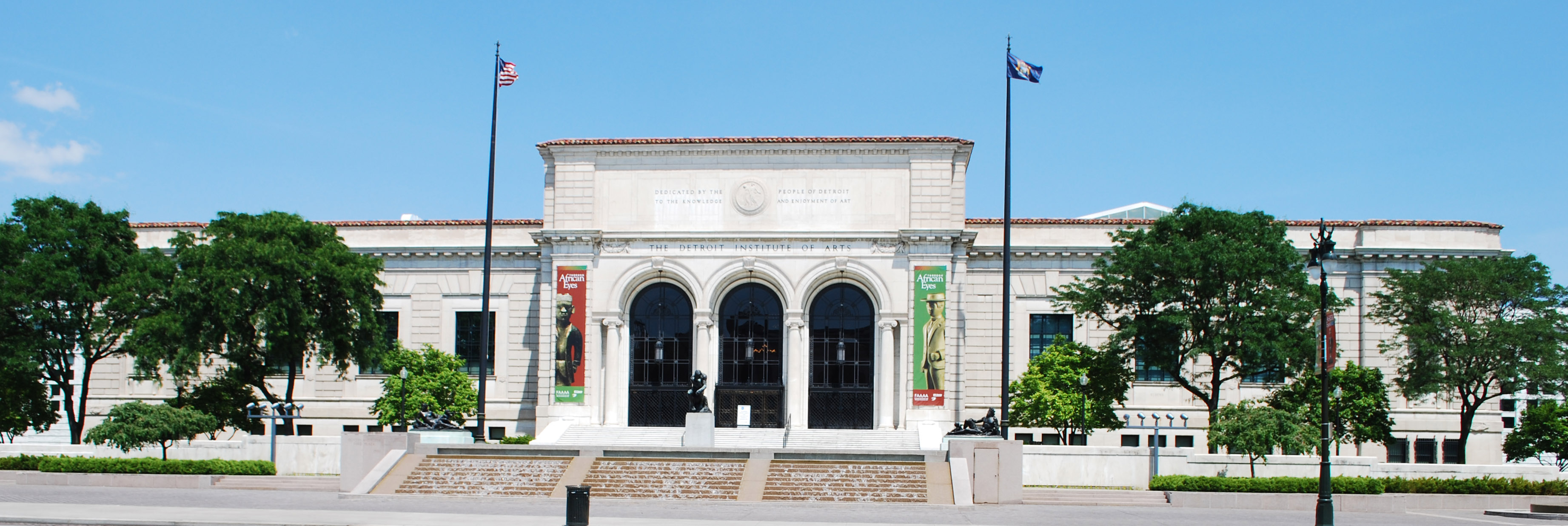
Detroit Institute of Arts

- June 12 - Willis F. Woods was hired as the director of the Detroit Institute of Arts (DIA). The DIA also received a gift from Henry Ford II of a Picasso cubist painting of Picasso's friend Pallares.
- June 19 - The Michigan Fair Employment Practices Commission found Northwest Airlines guilty of discrimination and ordered it to hire African American clerk, Marlene White, as a stewardess.
- June 6–25 - A strike by 3,200 UAW members at Ford Motors' stamping plant in Walton Hills, Ohio, shut down all of the company's assembly plants and many of its manufacturing facilities. The strike ended on June 24.
- June 24 - The Detroit Tigers and New York Yankees played the longest game in elapsed time in Major League Baseball history—seven hours and 22 innings. The Yankees won, 9–7, on a Jack Reed home run off Phil Regan.
- June 28 - At a White House meeting with President Kennedy, Governor Swainson announced that Burroughs Corp. had been awarded an Air Force contract to build "BUIC"—an automated computer system to provide early warnings of the approach of enemy aircraft. The contract was expected to create 1,000 new jobs in Detroit.

=== July ===
- July 1 - A series of state nuisance taxes went into effect in Michigan, including seven cents on a pack of cigarettes, two cents for a bottle of beer, eight percent on bottles of liquor, and four percent on telephone calls and telegrams.
- July 1 - Detroit's one percent income tax, including a commuter tax on non-residents working in Detroit went into effect. A legal challenge to the commuter tax was rejected by Wayne County Circuit Judge Neal Fitzgerald on July 2.
- July 1 - Detroit Mayor Cavanagh's two-and-a-half year old son, Christopher, was choked and pinned at the neck by an automatic car window. He remained unconscious and near death for 10 minutes until receiving mouth-to-mouth respiration by an FBI agent.
- July 3 - A crowd estimated at between 500,000 and 600,000 watched the annual International Freedom Festival fireworks display on the Detroit River.
- July 10 - An investigation into Detroit's municipal garbage incinerators results in the indictment of 30 city employees and five private contractors. The contractors allegedly bribed the workers to allow them to use the incinerators without paying over $1 million in fees.

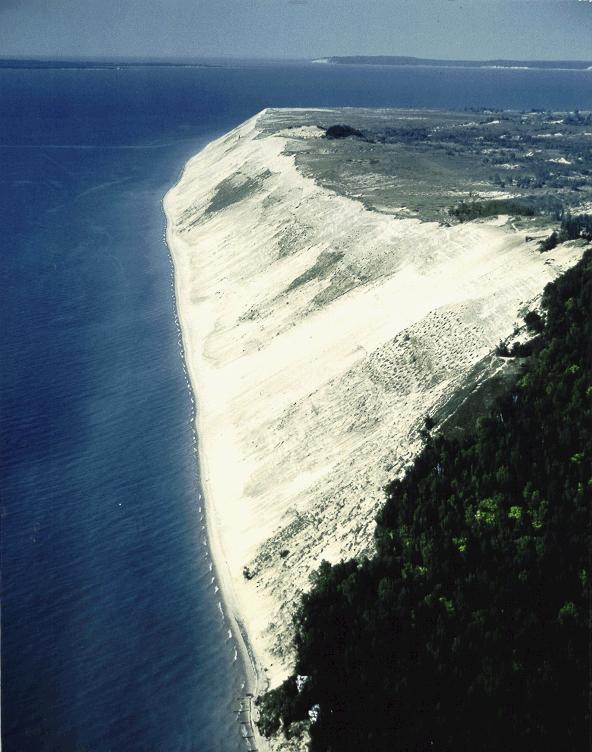
Sleeping Bear Dunes

- July 11 - A bill to create a 77,000-acre Sleeping Bear Dunes National Lakeshore was introduced by Senators Philip Hart and Patrick V. McNamara. (The park was finally authorized eight years later in 1970.)
- July 18 - The Michigan Supreme Court ordered redistricting of Michigan Senate seats with equal representation in each district. The old districts were created in 1952, had populations as low as 55,806 in the Upper Peninsula and as high as 690,583 in Oakland County, and were held to violate the Equal Protection Clause of the Fourteenth Amendment. The Court also cancelled the August 7 primary elections for the Senate seats and ordered the legislature and governor urgently to draw new districts. The Detroit Free Press called the decision "a political revolution which may realign the balance of rural-urban power." Republican leaders in the legislature threatened to impeach the justices.
- July 20 - General Motors reported a record $776 million in earnings in the first half of 1962. It also reported record sales of $7.691 billion and record payroll of $1.936 billion during the same period.
- July 25 - Ford Motor reported earnings of $268.3 and sales of $4.042 billion for the first half of 1962.
- July 27 - After hearing arguments from both sides in a small New Hampshire courthouse, U.S. Supreme Court Justice Potter Stewart temporarily stayed the Michigan Supreme Court's redistricting order until the full court could hear the matter in the fall.
- July 30 - A British freighter, the Montrose, sank in the Detroit River after it collided with a cement barge. The Montrose was towed away on November 19.
- July 30 - Detroit architect Minoru Yamasaki was named "Nisei of the Biennium" at the 17th biennial Japanese-American Citizens League convention.
- July - Detroit's 1963 automobile offerings included 22 cars with more than 300 horsepower and 12 over 400 horsepower. New models included the Buick Riviera and Studebaker Avanti. Cadillac introduced a high-compression V-8 engine with 325 horsepower.

=== August ===
- August - Revival meetings by Texas faith healer Gene Ewing draw large crowds to his tent in Highland Park and criticism from mainstream religious leaders and the press. On August 24, Highland Park officials ordered Ewing to move his tent out of the city within two days.
- August - A divorce action filed in 1961 by Horace Dodge, Jr., against his fifth wife, Gregg Sherwood, a former showgirl, became public. The divorce proceedings remained a prominent topic in the news through the remainder of 1962, much of it focusing on alleged extravagant spending by Mrs. Dodge and alleged excessive drinking by Mr. Dodge.
- August 1 - The Michigan state constitutional convention, which started October 3, 1961, adjourns.
- August 7 - In Michigan's primary elections, John Swainson and George Romney were unopposed as the gubernatorial candidates of the Democrat and Republican parties. The defeat of 12 incumbents in the state legislature was viewed as a slap at the legislators for increasing their pay and imposing new "nuisance" taxes.
- August 12 - Barbara Holliday began publishing a series of six articles on the front page of the Detroit Free Press detailing her undercover experience starting in February as a member of the John Birch Society.
- August 13 - George Romney vowed that, if elected Governor of Michigan, he would not run for president in 1964.
- August 17 - The final 1962 model automobiles were manufactured. The total output was 6,685,000, a 23.6% increase over the 1961 model year and the second highest total in industry history, trailing only the 1955 model year with 7,136,000 vehicles manufactured.
- August 18 - An accident at the Calvert Distillery in Amherstburg, Ontario, resulted in 5,000 gallons (or 640,000 shots) of 100-proof whisky being dumped into the Detroit River.
- August 30 - The U.S. Justice Department filed an antitrust suit against General Motors seeking an injunction preventing the company from controlling the prices at which dealers sell the company's automobiles.
- August 31 - Democratic State Chairman Joe Collins filed a protest with the National Fair Practices Campaign Committee after George Romney asserted that Communist infiltration was currently a problem in the Democratic Party. After the protest, Romney clarified that he was not asserting that there were Communists in the Democratic Party at the present time.

=== September ===
- September 3 - At Detroit's annual Labor Day celebration, John Swainson and Walter Reuther spoke at the Michigan State Fairgrounds. Reuther campaigned to get people registered and out to vote on November 6 to reelect Gov. Swainson and to give President Kennedy the Congress he needed to enact his agenda. George Romney's request for an invitation to speak at the event was rejected, but he showed up to march in the parade and to listen to the speeches.

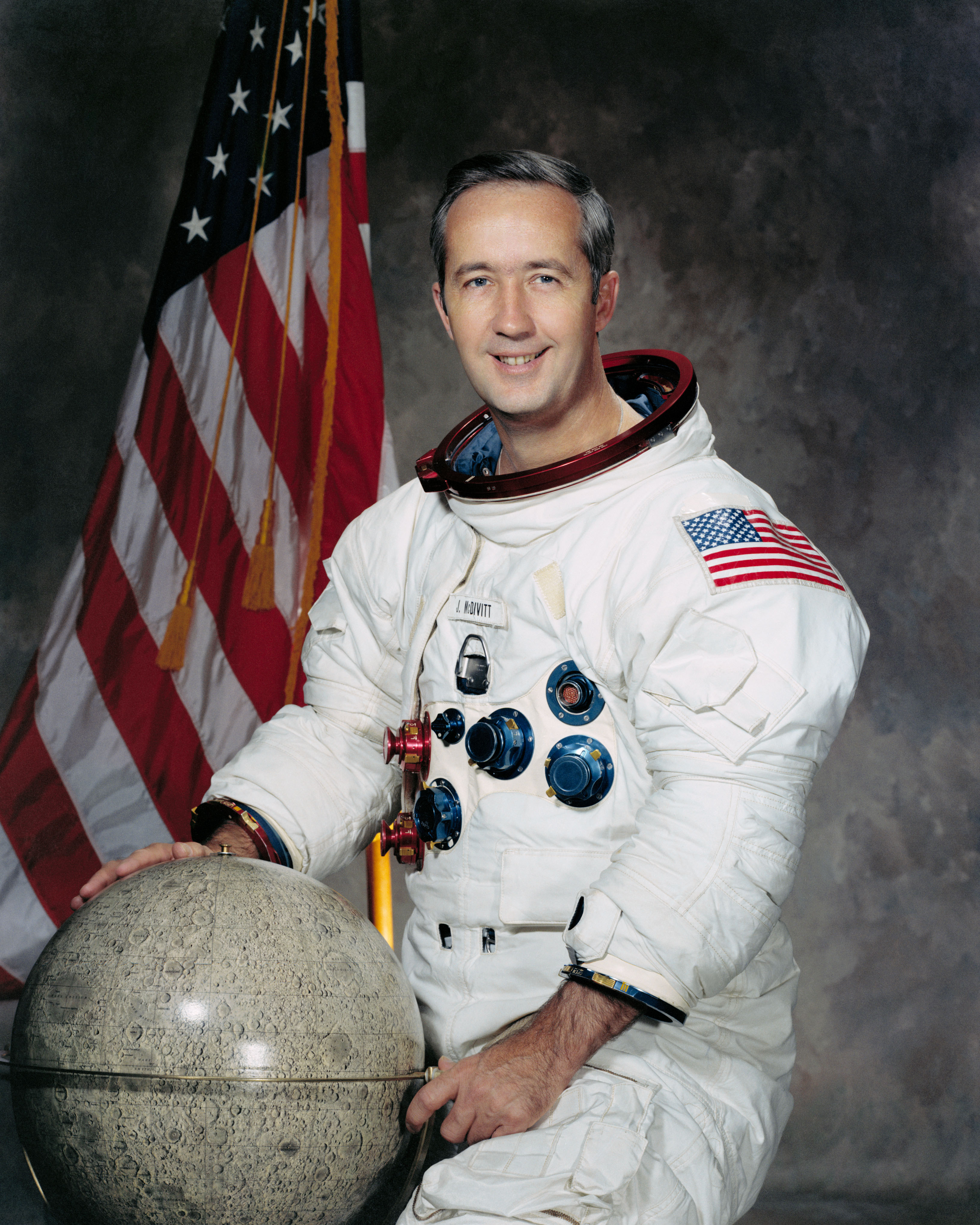
James McDivitt

- September 3 - The Michigan State Fair closed for the year with record-setting attendance that exceeded 1 million persons.
- September 16 - Two boys, ages 10 and 12, suffocated and died east of Grand Rapids when a clay pit at Murray Lake collapsed on them.
- September 16 - The Detroit Lions opened their 1962 season with a 45–7 victory over the Pittsburgh Steelers.
- September 17 - Nine new astronauts were introduced to the country. The group included Kalamazoo High School and University of Michigan graduate James McDivitt.
- September 20 - Architect Minoru Yamasaki of Birmingham was chosen as the architect for the World Trade Center in New York City.
- September 21 - University of Michigan research scientist Stephen Dinka aided Hungarian dancer Emese Szklenkay escape from her Communist watchdogs while she was in Paris. Dinka and Sklenkay fled to Ann Arbor where Dinka was married to Szklenkay's sister. The escape was the subject of a five-part series on the front page of the Detroit Free Press, and President Kennedy met with Szlenkay on October 6.
- September 27 - John Fetzer, owner of the Detroit Tigers, fired Rick Ferrell as the club's general manager and hired Jim Campbell to replace him.

=== October ===
- October - Automobile sales of 722,886 set an all-time record for a single month, passing the previous record of 702,400 set in April 1955.
- October 5–6 - President Kennedy campaigned in Michigan for Governor Swainson and Democratic Congressional nominees. A veteran Secret Service officer said that the crowds greeting Kennedy in Detroit were the largest he had seen for a presidential visit since Franklin Roosevelt. Kennedy also appeared in Flint and Muskegon.
- October 5 - Two freighters collided in the fog on Lake St. Clair. There were no injuries, though one of the freighters, the Hutchcliffe Hall, was badly damaged. The other ship maneuvered the Hutchcliffe Hall to shallow waters near the Grosse Pointe Farms municipal pier so that it could sink with the decks above water level.
- October 7 - Unemployment figures for September showed an unemployment rate in Michigan of 4.9%, the lowest since 1955. Approximately 140,000 persons were unemployed in Michigan out of a workforce of 2,868,000.
- October 8 - Gov. Swainson and George Romney met for a one-hour debate at the Detroit Economic Club. A second televised debate was held the next day. Telephone polling found low interest in the debate and lack of consensus as to who won the debate.
- October 8 - John Francis Dearden, Archbishop of Detroit, arrived in Rome to participate in the Second Vatican Council (Vatican II). A total of 10 Michigan bishops attended the Vatican Council.
- October 10 - George Romney met with Detroit Mayor Cavanagh. Cavanagh insisted on remaining neutral in the gubernatorial race.
- October 11 - Gov. Swainson distanced himself from a committee supporting him after it issued campaign literature touting Swainson's loss of both legs in a land mine explosion while serving in World War II.
- October 13 - Michigan State defeated Michigan, 28–0, and Sherman Lewis scored three touchdowns in the battle for the Paul Bunyan Trophy. The game was played before a crowd of 77,501, a record crowd at Spartan Stadium in East Lansing.

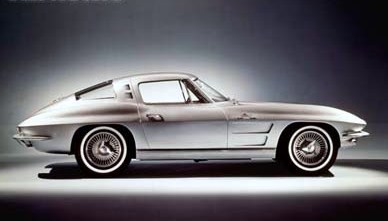
Chevrolet Corvette Sting Ray

- October 16 - Detroit was selected by the United States Olympic Committee as the United States' nominee as host city for the 1968 Summer Olympics.
- October 20 - The 44th National Automobile Show opened at Cobo Hall in Detroit. The opening ceremony touted industry statistics, including automobile employment in the United States totaling 2,233,000. New models attracting the most attention included the Studebaker Avanti, Buick Riviera, and a new sport coupe Chevrolet Corvette Sting Ray. Attendance over the 10 days of the show totaled 1,137,627.

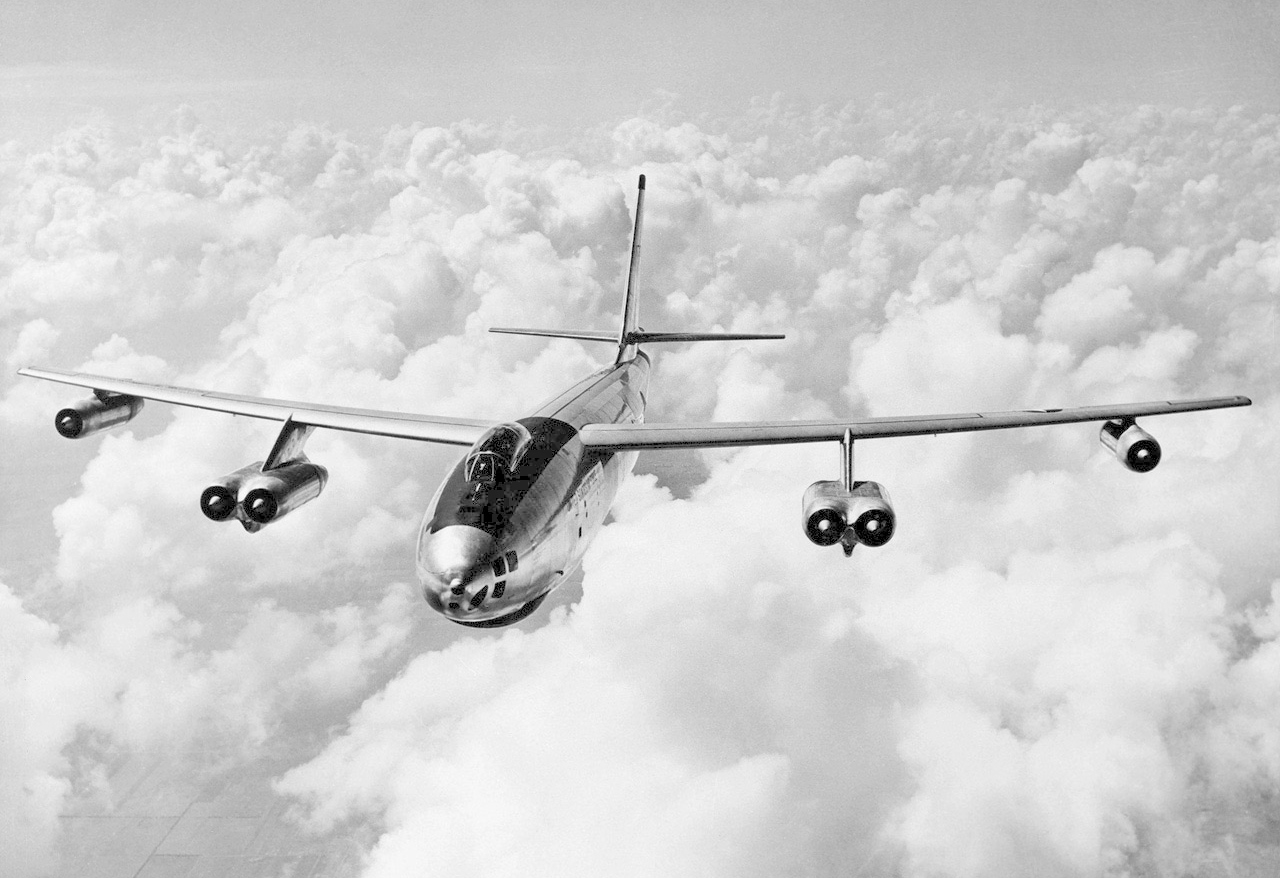
B-47 Stratojet

- October 22 - As the Cuban Missile Crisis gripped the country with a blockade of Cuba, Detroit Mayor Cavanagh urged business leaders at the Automobile Show to unite behind President Kennedy. On October 23, Michigan-based military units were on alert, and six Strategic Air Command B-47 Stratojet bombers landed at Detroit Metro Airport.
- October 24 - Mrs. Edsel Ford pledged $1 million to the Detroit Institute of Arts, the largest single gift made to the City of Detroit to that time.
- October 28–31 - Amid fear following the Cuban Missile Crisis, the Detroit Free Press published a series of articles on its front page detailing the likely impact if an atomic bomb were dropped on Detroit and offering tips for survival.
- October 28 - Democratic Party officials in Michigan charged that the Committee for Honest Elections was using tactics suited to the Gestapo or Soviet Secret Police to intimidate black voters.
- October 29 - General Motors announced record-setting third quarter results, including $10.45 billion in sales and $962 million in net income.

=== November ===
- November 3 - Employment figures for October were released, showing an unemployment rate of 4.5% in Michigan with 128,000 persons lacking jobs. The unemployment rate was the lowest since 1955 when the rate dipped to 2.8%.
- November 6

* George W. Romney defeated John Swainson for Governor. Romney's margin of victory was 78,497 votes.
* The Republican Party retained control in both houses of the Michigan Legislature. The Republicans won the Michigan House of Representatives by a 58-52 margin and the Michigan Senate by a 23-11 margin.
* In the race for Michigan's at-large Congressional seat, a seat resulting from a new Congressional seat being awarded to the state and the state's inability to adopt a redistricting plan, Democrat Neil Staebler of Ann Arbor defeated Republican Alvin Morell Bentley of Owosso. No Michigan Congressional districts changed parties, as 17 incumbents were reelected, and Republican J. Edward Hutchinson won the District 4 seat previously held for 28 years by Republican Clare Hoffman.
* Democrats swept the other statewide offices: T. John Lesinski for Lieutenant Governor; James M. Hare for Secretary of State; Frank J. Kelley for Attorney General; Sanford A. Brown for Treasurer; and Billie S. Farnum for Auditor General.

- November 8 - After the best start in team history (8-0-2), the Detroit Red Wings suffered the first loss of their 1962–63 season, falling 4–1 to the Montreal Canadiens.

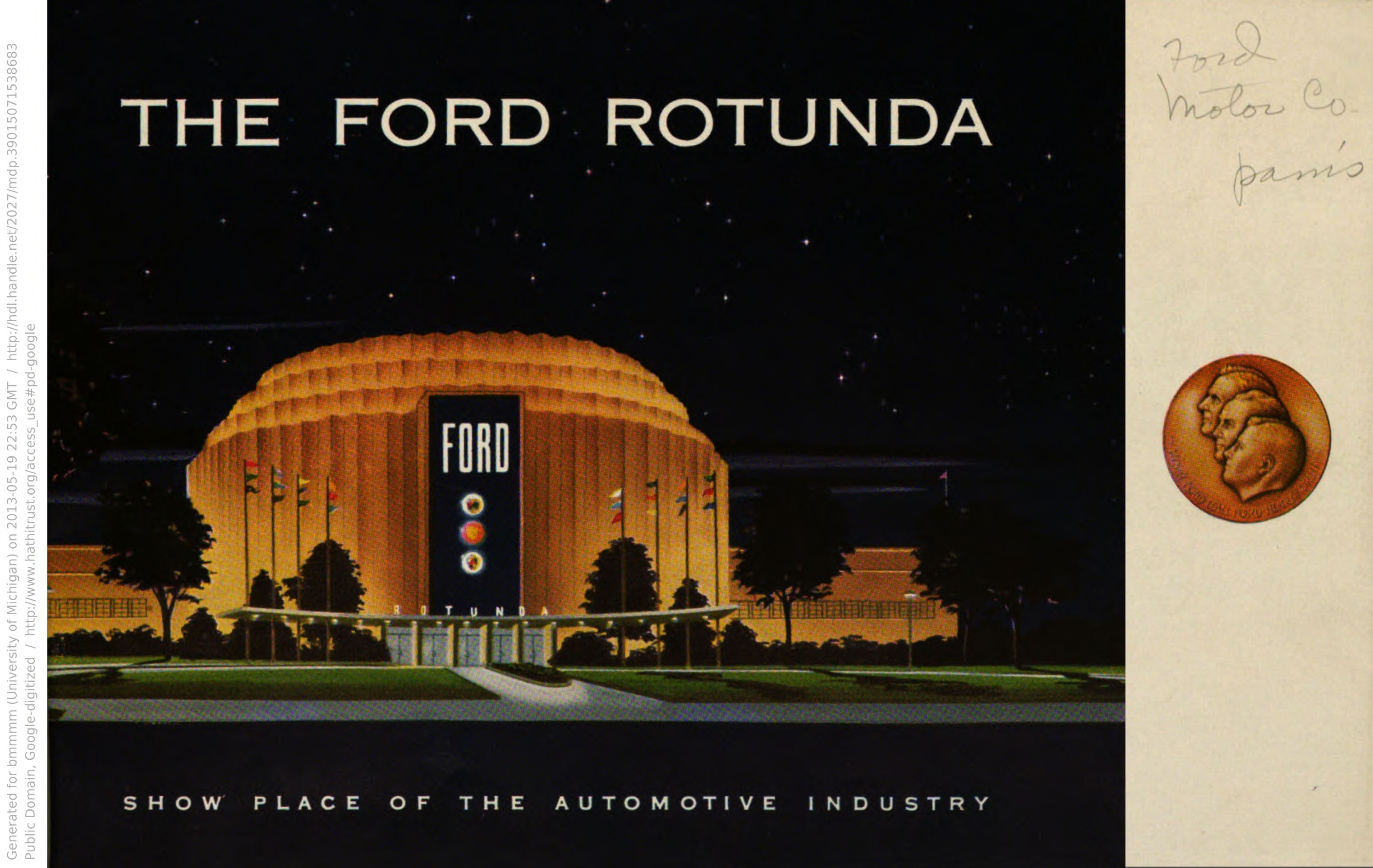
Ford Rotunda

- November 9 - The Ford Rotunda in Dearborn, the fifth most popular tourist site in the mid-20th century, was destroyed by fire. The fire began in the early afternoon on the roof and quickly consumed the structure. A maintenance worker, John Riley, remained in the building to turn off gas and electrical lines, suffered smoke inhalation, and was the only person injured.
- November 9 - More than 100 city, state, and federal officers raided the Gotham Hotel in Detroit. The hotel was alleged to be the headquarters of the city's numbers gambling ring. A total of 41 arrests were made.
- November 11 - The $13 million interchange between the Chrysler (I-75) and Ford Freeways (I-94) was partially completed and opened to traffic. It was the first interchange in Michigan between two interstate highways.
- November 15 - American Motors distributed $3.2 million in stock to 27,000 workers as part of the first profit-sharing plan in the automobile industry. Two weeks later, UAW President Walter Reuther warned that the auto industry's Big Three would need in 1964 to provide similar profit-sharing programs or provide the equivalent in wages.
- November 18 - In a move seen as a setback by those seeking to challenge to the authority of Teamsters president Jimmy Hoffa, long-distance truckers voted 3,780 to 3,274 to remain with the Teamsters rather than join the AFL-CIO. Six days later, Hoffa loyalists held a rally at Cobo Hall in Detroit. At the rally, Hoffa attacked several U.S. Senators, referred to Robert F. Kennedy as "Bobby Boy", and denounced newspaper stories about him as "a barrage of filth and slime."
- November 22 - The Detroit Lions defeated the Green Bay Packers, 26–14, on Thanksgiving Day in Detroit, snapping the Packers' 19-game unbeaten streak. The Lions sacked Bart Starr for 110 yards in losses.
- November 26 - Detroit Mayor Cavanagh signed into law an ordinance prohibiting realtors from trying to generate sales and rentals by claiming that a neighborhood is about to undergo a racial, religious or ethnic change. Two days later, Cavanagh signed a law providing for fluoridation of Detroit's water.
- November 29 - George Fitzgerald, Teamsters attorney since 1935, was fired after testifying in the bribery trial of Jimmy Hoffa in Nashville. Fitzgerald testified he cashed a $15,000 check at Hoffa's request and delivered the money to Hoffa. Hoffa claimed Fitzgerald resigned, but Hoffa was quoted as telling Fitzgerald in the hallway outside the courtroom: "You're all through. Turn in your books and records."

=== December ===
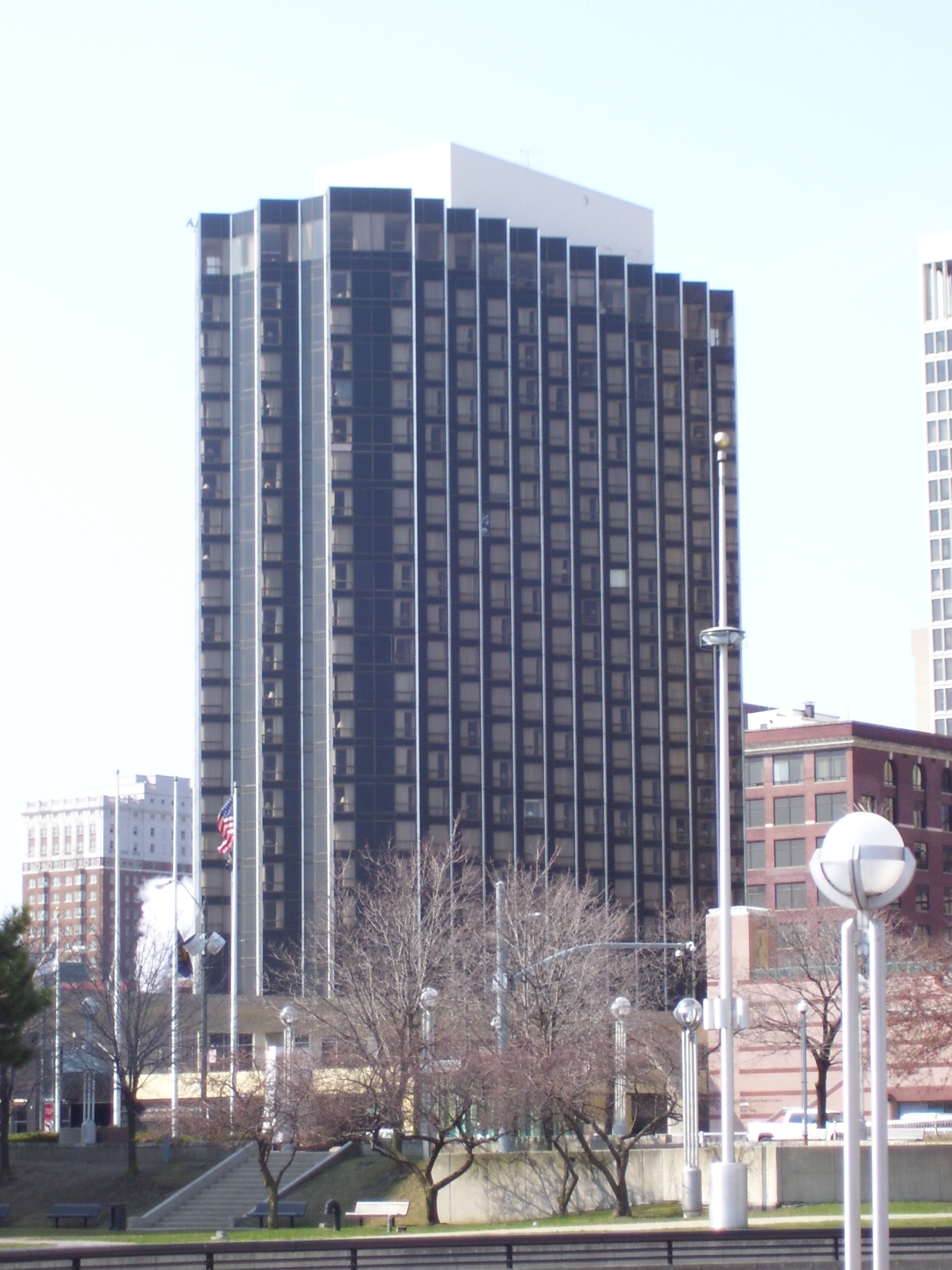
Pontchartrain Hotel

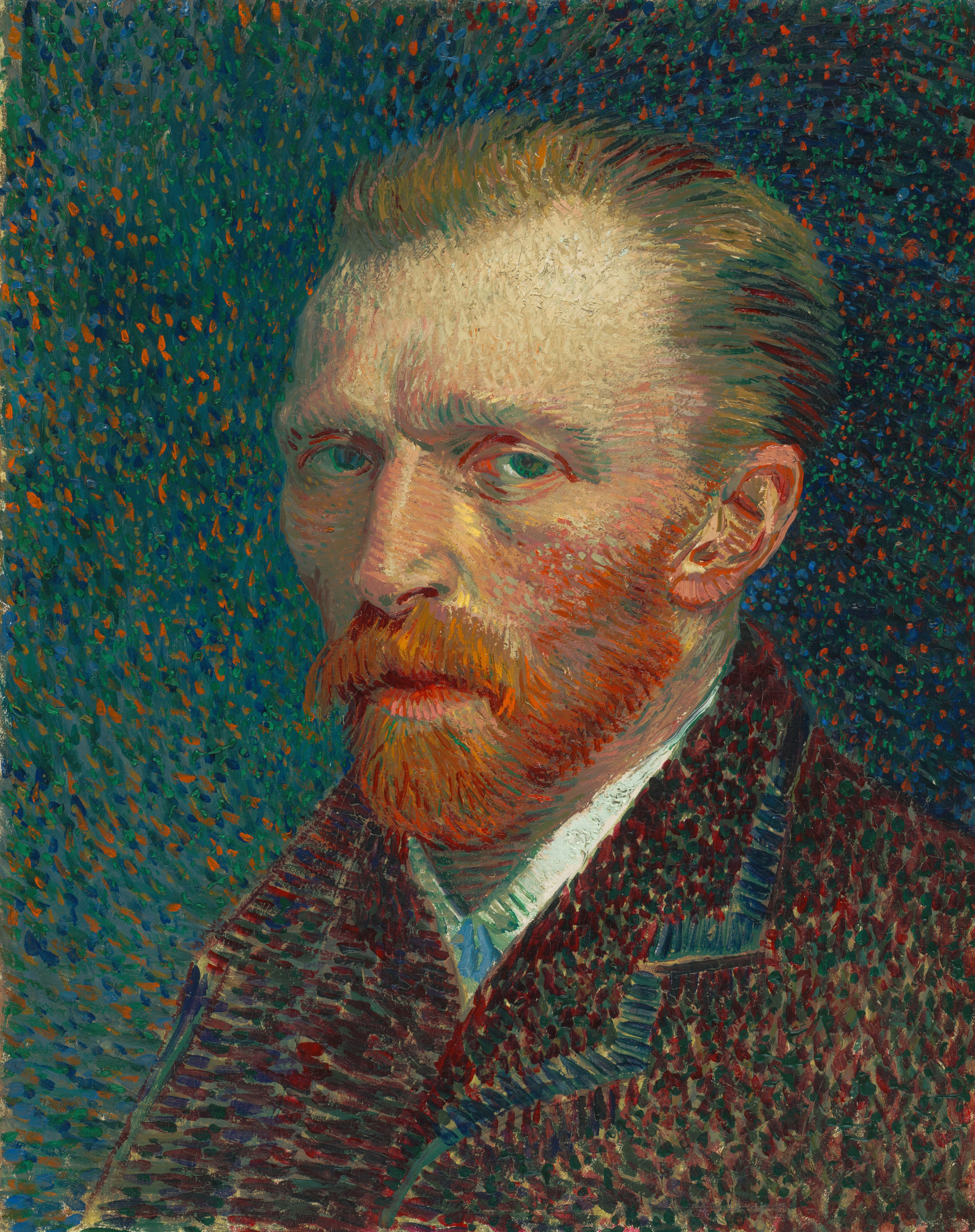
Vincent van Gogh

- December 5 - Jimmy Hoffa was shot with a pellet gun by assailant Warren Swanson while in the Nashville courtroom where he was being tried on bribery charges. After being shot, Hoffa jumped from his chair and punched Swanson in the jaw, knocking him to the ground. Hoffa's motion for a mistrial was denied, and the jury was sequestered and one juror removed. It was later revealed that the juror was removed after a Teamster official met with her husband in alleged attempt at jury tampering. A second juror was removed after telling the judge that he had been offered $10,000 to vote against conviction.
- December 5 - Cadillac announced a $55 million plan to expand its production facilities in Detroit. It was the largest industrial expansion in Detroit since World War II.
- December 7 - The Fisher brothers sold the 28-story Fisher Building in Detroit's New Center district for $15 million to a group led by Louis Berry and George D. Seyburn.
- December 7 - Samuel Shapiro, a history professor at Michigan State University-Oakland, was fired after visiting Cuba with the pro-Castro Fair Play for Cuba Committee.
- December 8 - Jimmy Hoffa was reelected as president of Detroit Teamsters Local 299.
- December 11 - Much of western Michigan was buried in snow, with snowfall in Paw Paw totaling 48 inches.
- December 11 - Developers revealed that a new hotel to be built across from the Cobo Hall, the first major hotel to be built in Detroit in over 30 years, would be named the Pontchartrain (later renamed the Crowne Plaza Detroit Downtown Riverfront), which was the original name of the city and the name of an old hotel in the city.
- December 12 - A special Vincent van Gogh retrospective consisting of 80 paintings and 60 drawings opened at the Detroit Institute of Arts. The exhibition ran through January 27, 1963. The exhibition broke the museum's attendance record, drawing 147,000 persons.

== Births ==
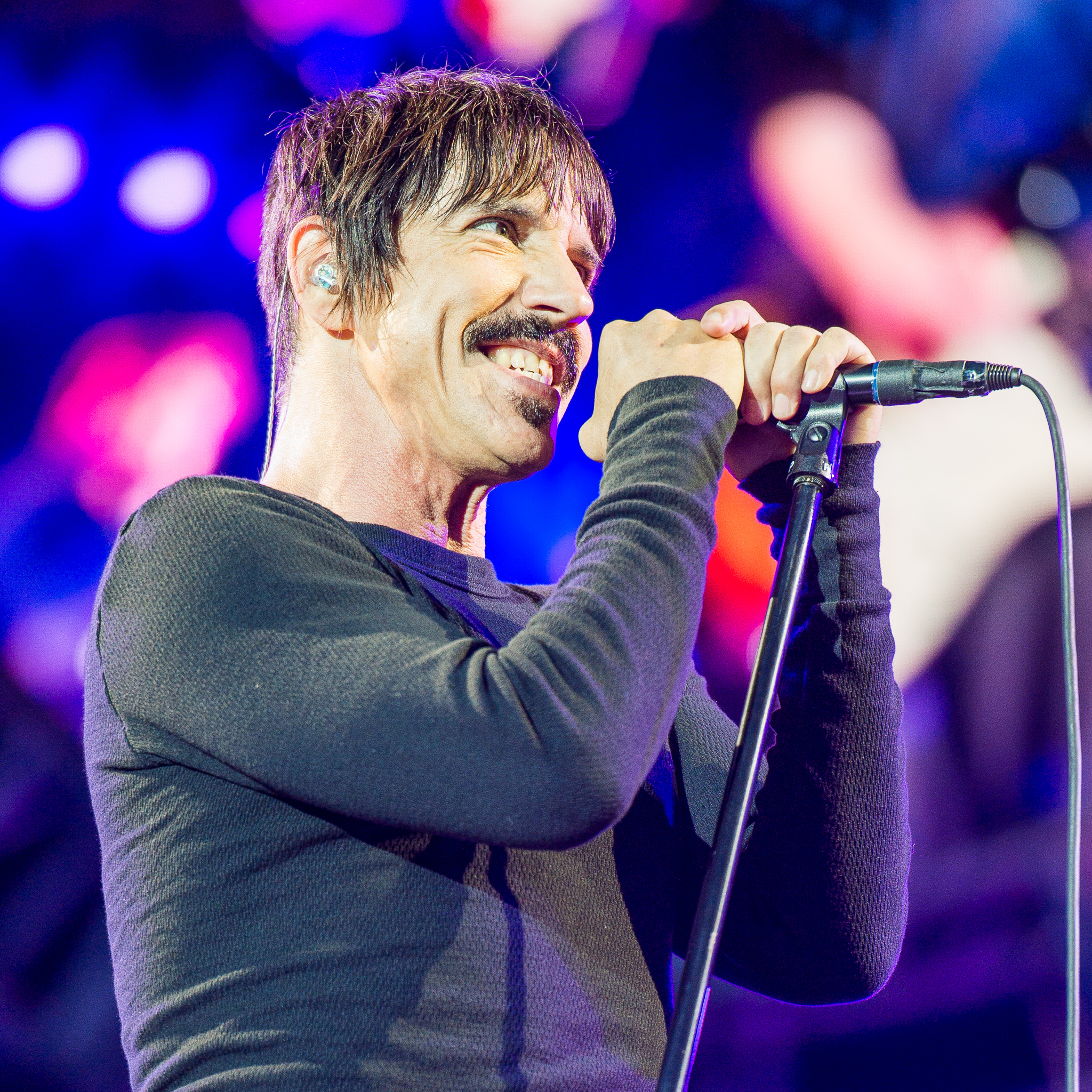
Anthony Kiedis

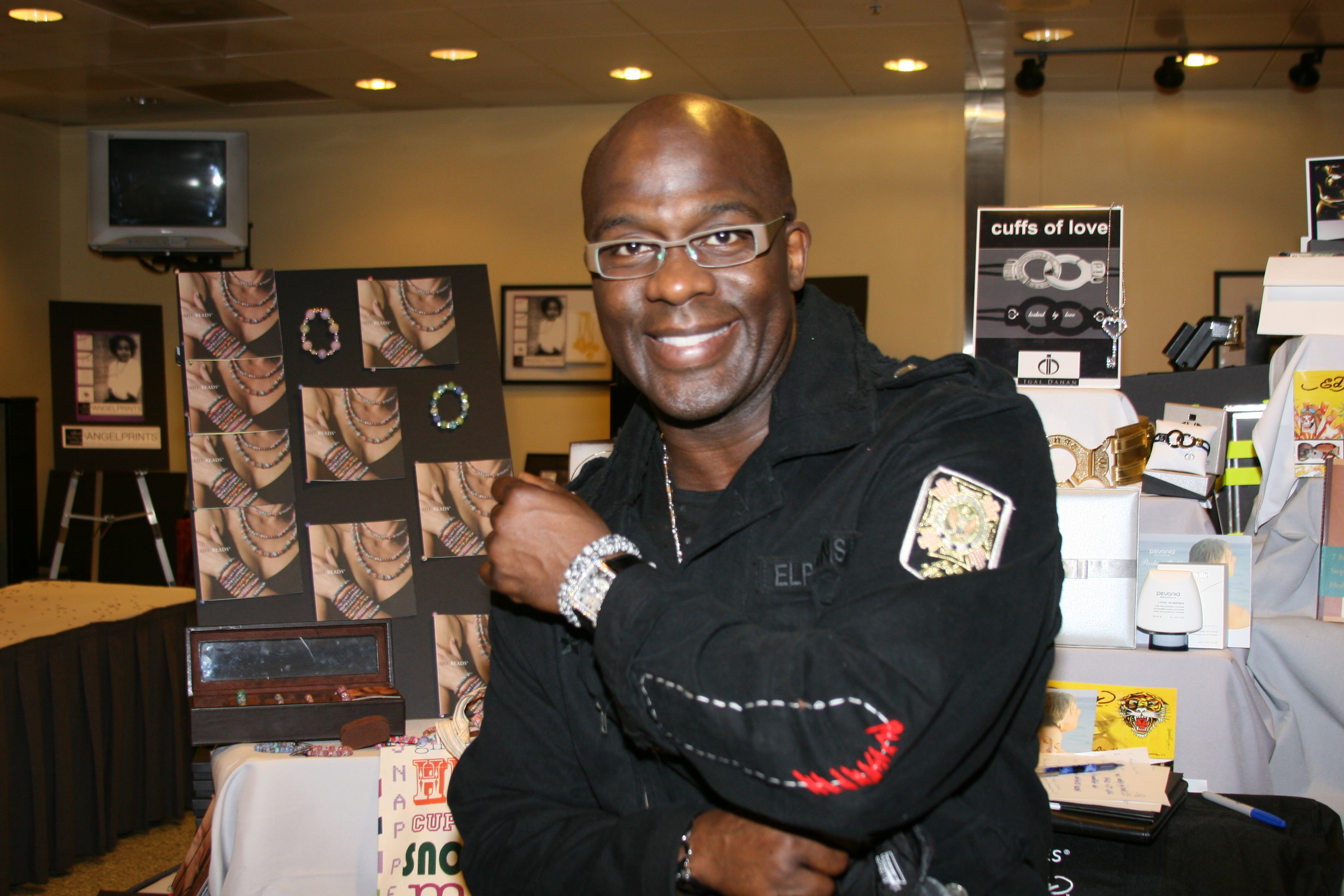
BeBe Winans

- January 17 - Dan Gilbert, founder of Rock Ventures and Quicken Loans, in Detroit
- January 19 - Chris Sabo, baseball player, in Detroit
- January 29 - Michael Skupin, software developer and television personality (Survivor), in Farmington Hills
- February 7 - Milton McCrory, welterweight boxer, in Detroit
- February 15 - Brian Brennan, American football wide receiver, in Bloomfield Township
- February 18 - Scott Kalitta, drag racer, in Mt. Clemens
- February 20 - Dwayne McDuffie, comic book and television writer, in Detroit
- February 22 - Lenda Murray, female bodybuilding champion, in Detroit
- February 27 - Grant Show, actor in Melrose Place, in Detroit
- March 17 - Roxy Petrucci, drummer for Madam X and Vixen, in Rochester
- March - Scott Tennant, Grammy Award-winning classical guitarist, in Detroit
- April 2 - John McNamara, writer, producer, showrunner and television creator, in Ann Arbor
- April 17 - Niki Haris, singer, in Benton Harbor
- May 25 - Susan Diol, actress, in Marquette
- June 23 - Steve Shelley, drummer for Sonic Youth, in Midland
- June 26 - Preston A. Whitmore II, motion picture director (This Christmas, Doing Hard Time), in Detroit
- July 10 - Gary Aubuchon, Congressman for Florida, in Ferndale
- July 27 - Cecilia Muñoz, director of the White House Domestic Policy Council under President Obama, in Detroit
- July 29 - Margaret Bell-Byars, gospel musician, in Detroit
- August 14 - Jim Buckmaster, computer programmer and CEO of Craigslist, in Ann Arbor
- August 20 - Paul Porter, gospel musician, in Detroit
- August 25 - Tommy Blacha, comedy writer (Metalocalypse, Da Ali G Show and Late Night with Conan O'Brien), in Detroit
- August 29 - Carl Banks, American football linebacker, in Flint
- September 7 - Mark Guzdial, computer scientist, in Detroit
- September 17 - Paul Feig, actor, in Mt. Clemens
- September 17 - BeBe Winans, gospel and R&B singer, in Detroit
- October 12 - Kevin R. McMahon, conductor and composer, in Grand Rapids
- October 14 - Ron Pitts, sportcaster and former football player, in Detroit
- November 1 - Anthony Kiedis, lead singer and lyricist of the Red Hot Chili Peppers, in Grand Rapids
- November 4 - Bob Tyrrell, tattoo artist, in Detroit
- November 7 - Tracie Savage, actress, in Ann Arbor
- December 1 - Pamela McGee, basketball player, in Flint
- December 4 - Vinnie Dombroski, lead vocalist and main songwriter for Sponge, in Detroit
- December 9 - Juan Atkins, originator of Detroit techno music, in Detroit
- No date - John Jasinski, president of Northwest Missouri State University, in Flint
- No date - Bonnie Rideout, fiddler and recording artist, in Saline
- No date - Thomas Sugrue, American historian at University of Pennsylvania and NYU, in Detroit
- No date - Robert Kirby, openly gay cartoonist, known the syndicated comic Curbside, in Detroit
- No date - Carla Cook, Grammy-nominated jazz vocalist, in Detroit

=== Gallery of 1962 births ===
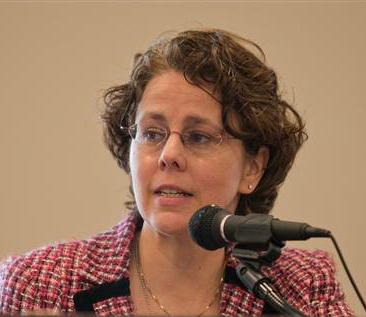
Cecilia Muñoz

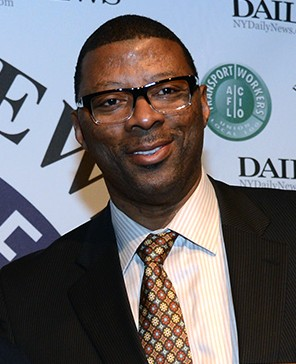
Carl Banks

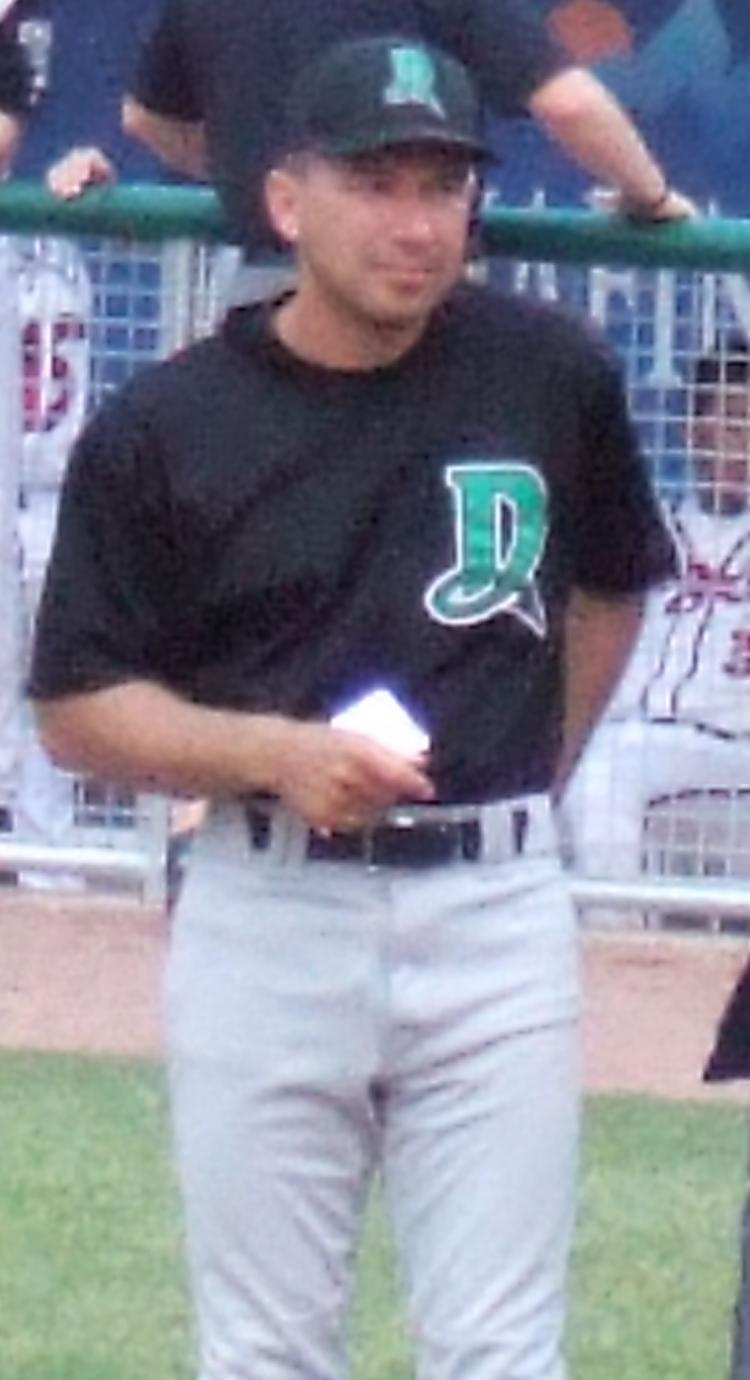
Chris Sabo

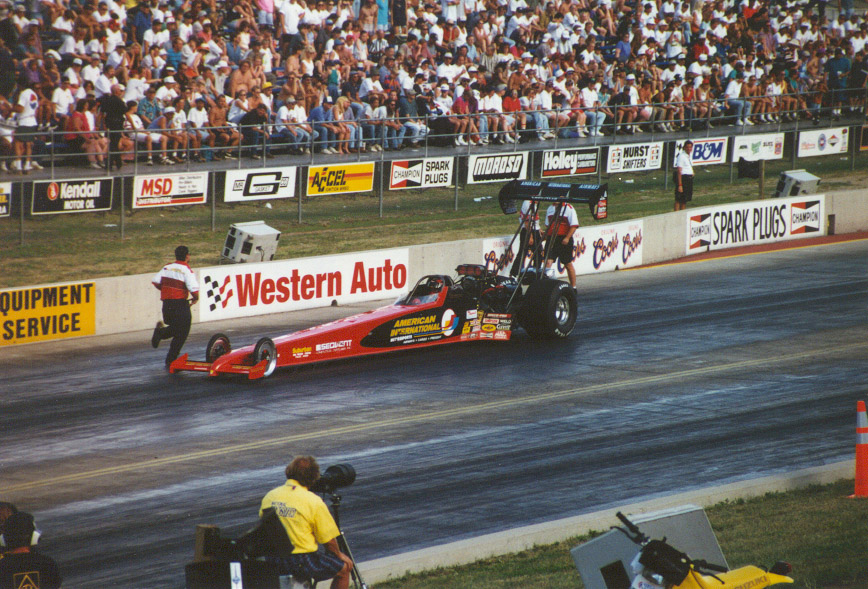
Scott Kalitta's dragster

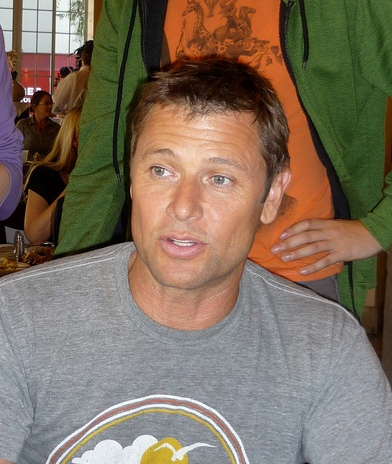
Grant Show

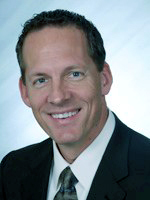
Gary Aubuchon

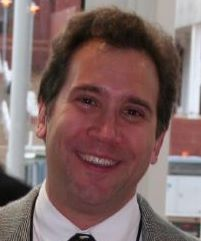
Mark Guzdial

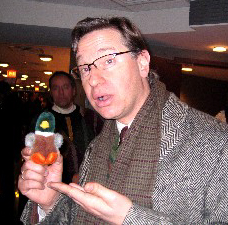
Paul Feig

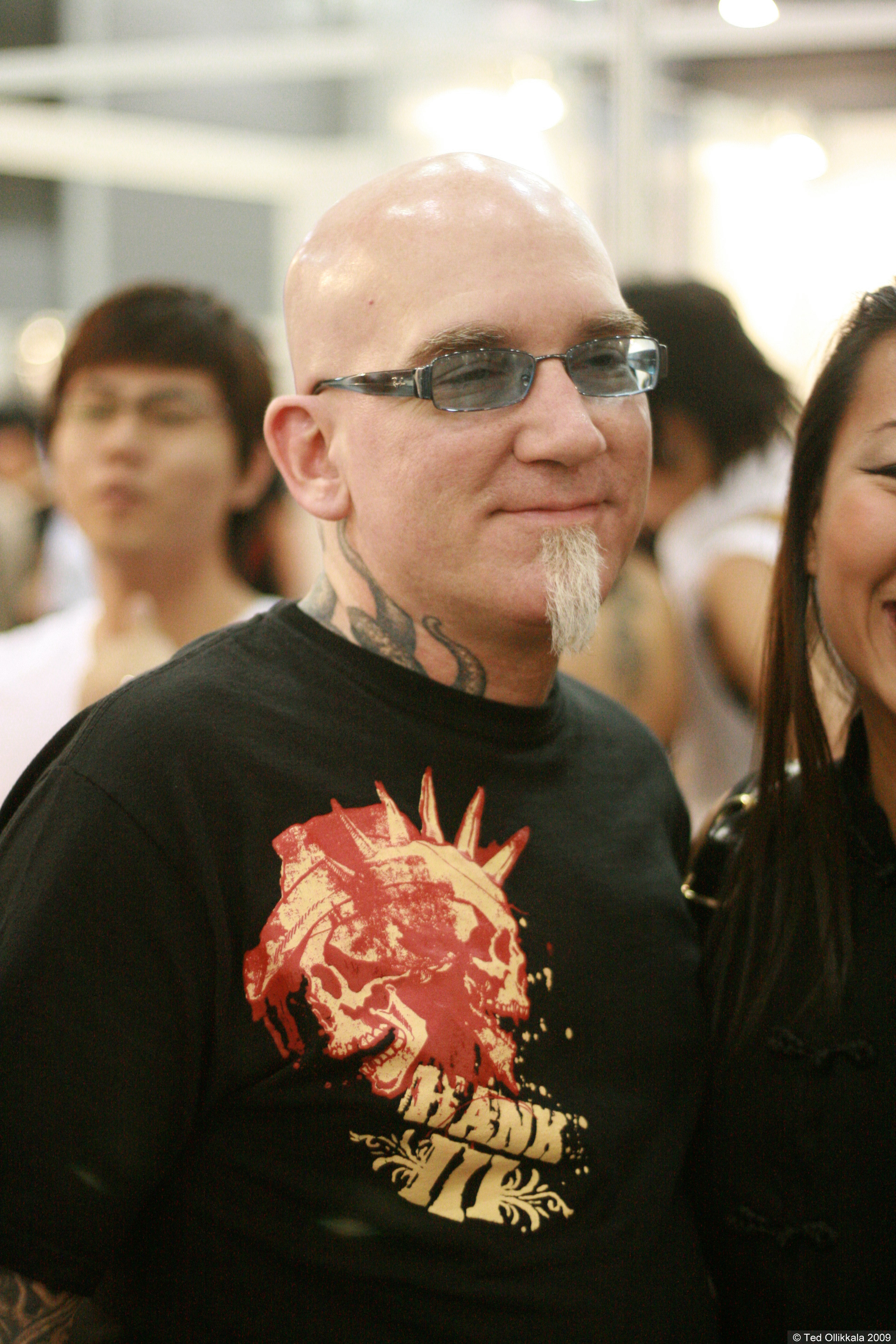
Bob Tyrrell

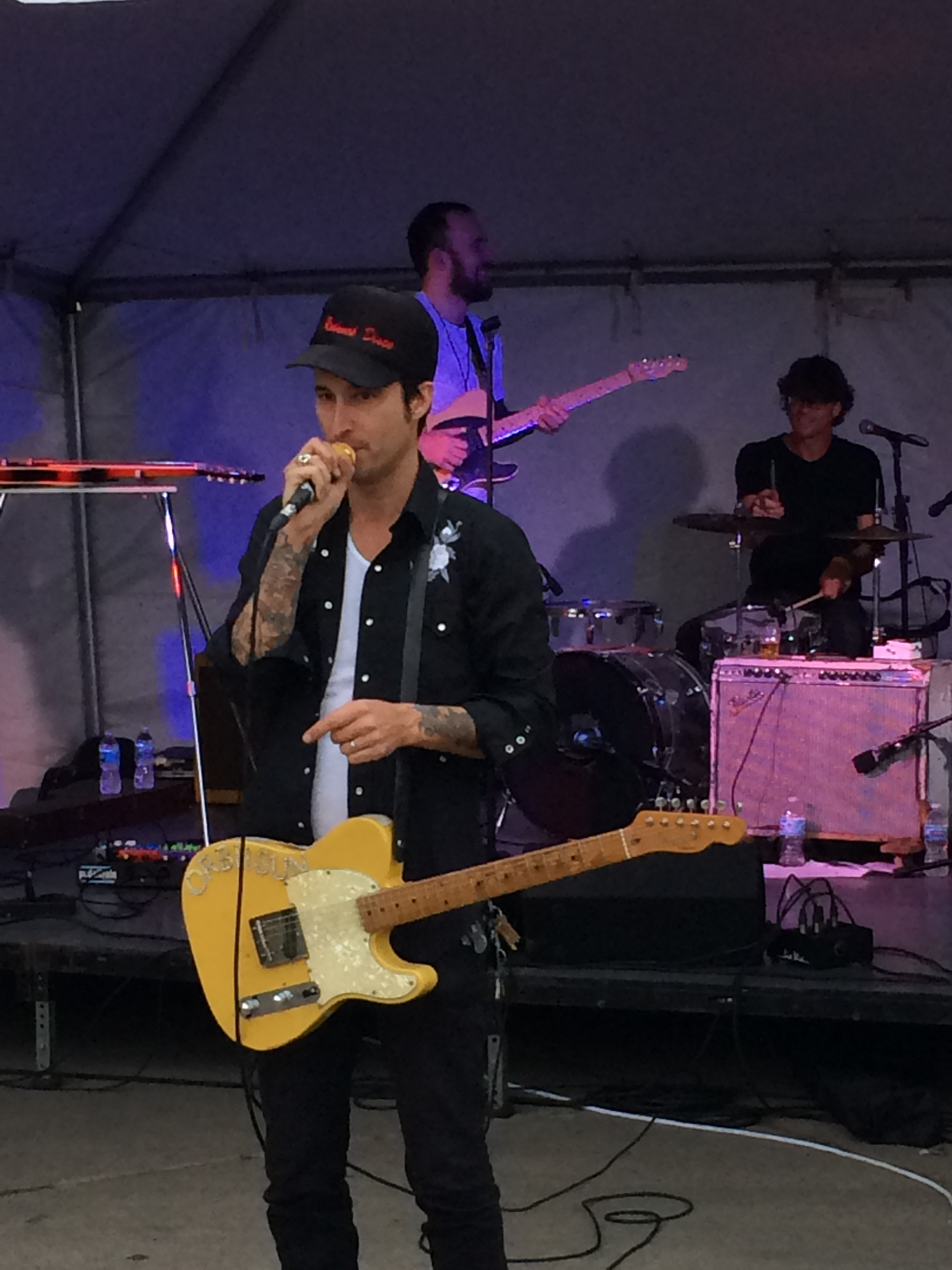
Vinnie Dombrowski

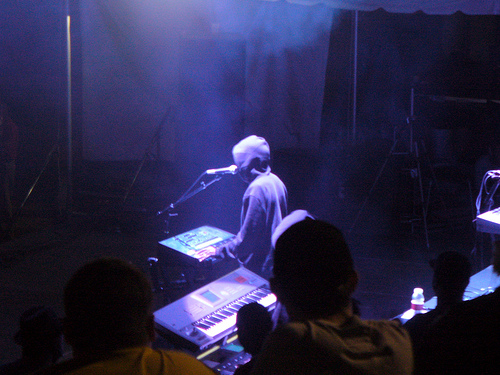
Juan Atkins

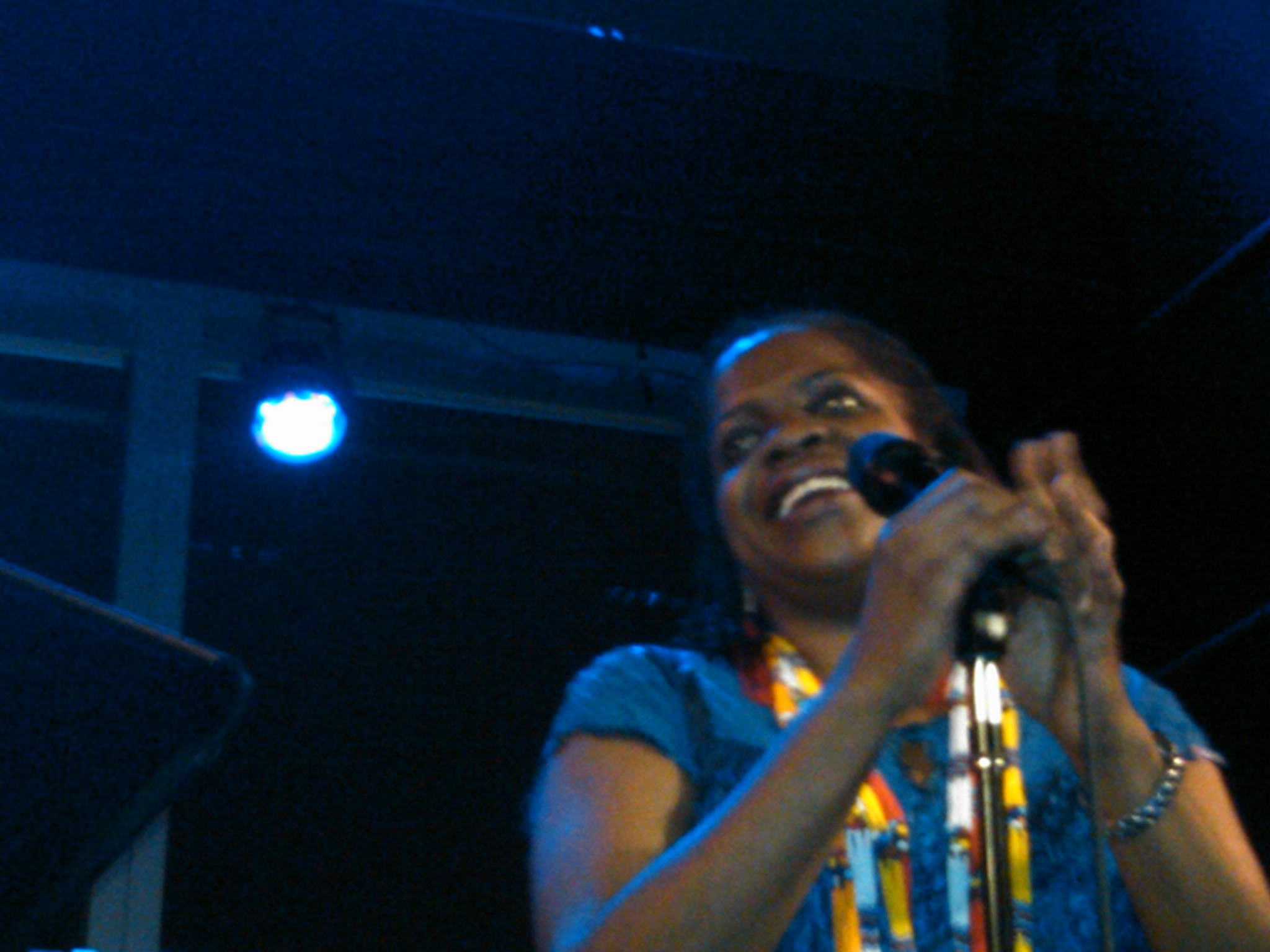
Carla Cook

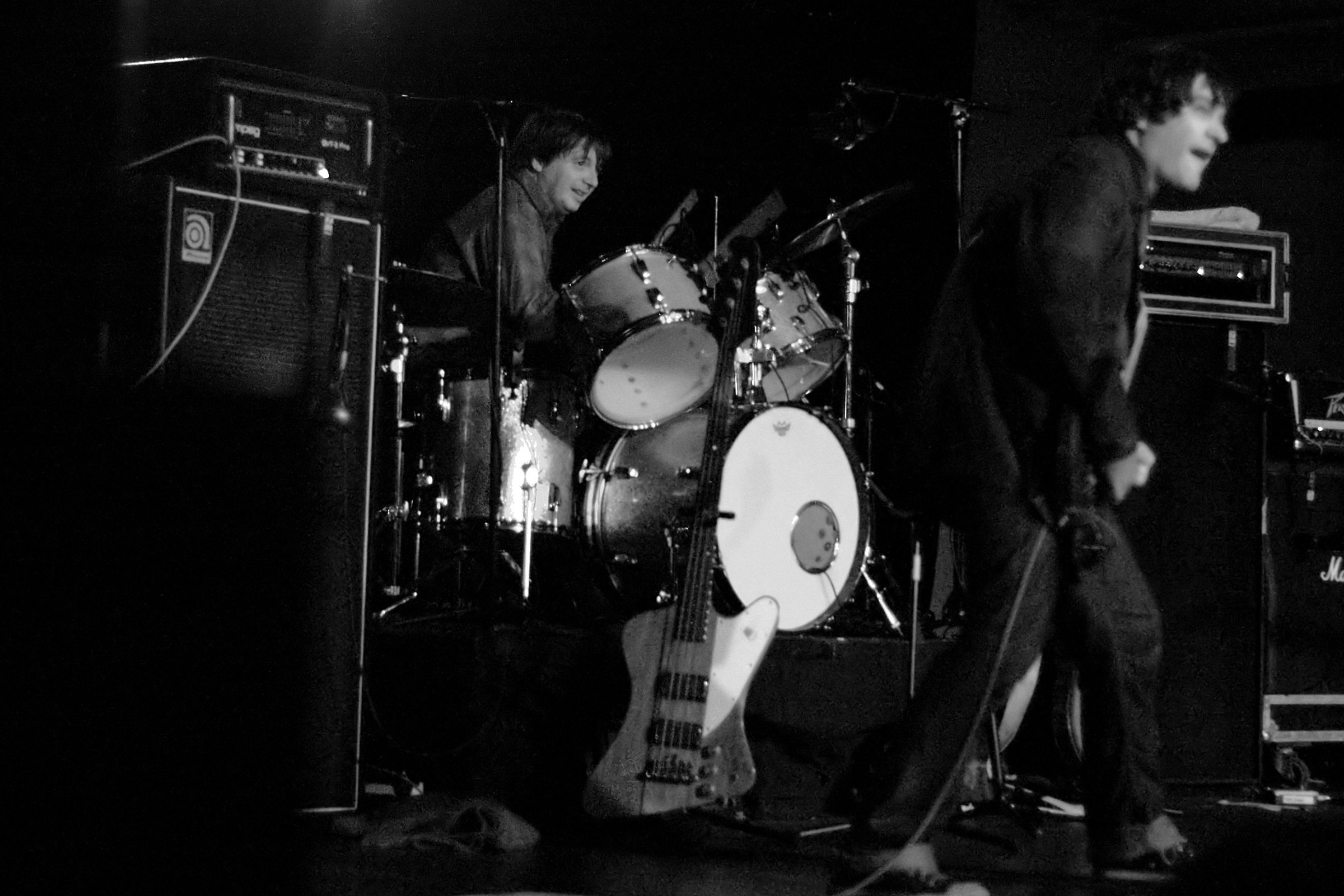
Steve Shelley with Sonic Youth

== Deaths ==
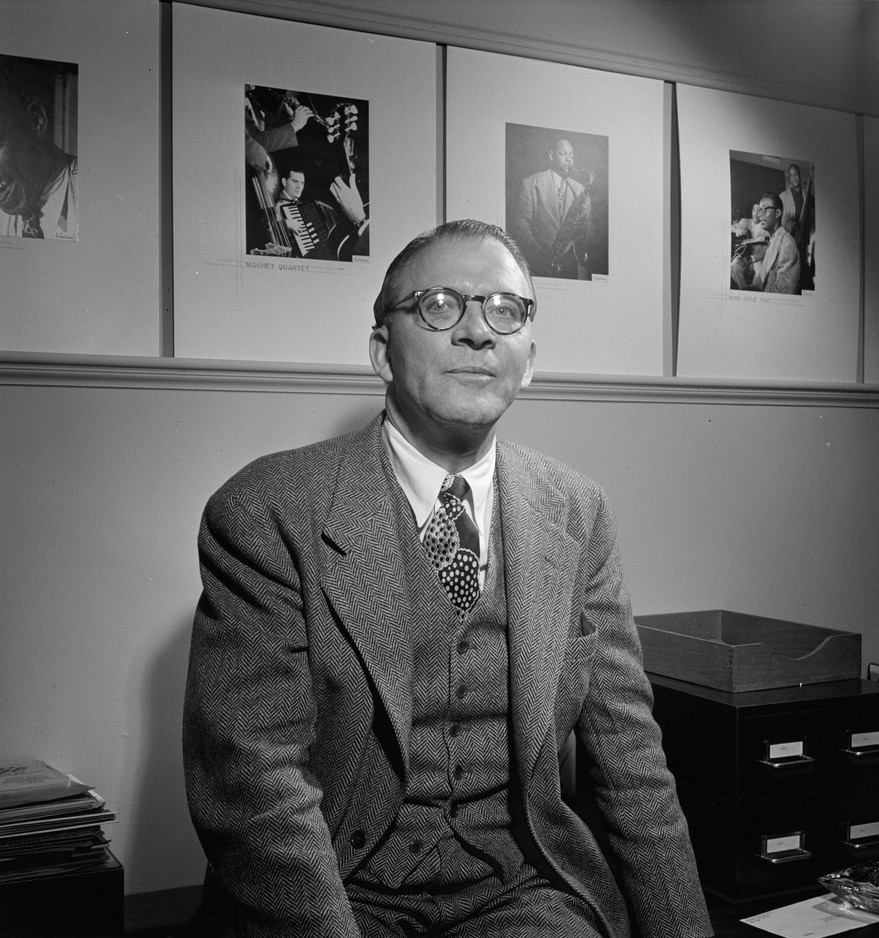
Jean Goldkette

- January 2 - Robert Raynolds McMath, solar astronomer and director of the McMath–Hulbert Observatory until 1961, in Bloomfield Hills at age 70
- January 23 - Ralph H. Young, Michigan State's athletic director for 32 years from 1923 to 1954, in East Lansing at age 72
- January 26 - Lynn S. Miller, editor of the Royal Oak Daily Tribune since 1919, in Royal Oak at age 70
- January 28 - Theodore I. Fry, Michigan State Treasurer (1933–1938, 1941–1942), at age 80 in Fremont, Michigan
- March 4 - Hanley Dawson, bank teller to Henry Ford who was given a Detroit Ford dealership in 1911, in Birmingham at age 73
- March 20 - John Tjaarda, Dutch-born designer of kitchenware and automobiles whose innovations included the first rear-engine auto in the United States, independent wheel suspension, and fully automatic drives, in Diamond Springs, California, at age 65
- March 24 - Jean Goldkette, Detroit bandleader who "discovered" the Dorsey brothers, Artie Shaw, and Glen Gray, in Santa Barbara, California, at age 67
- March 27 - Albert Barron, athletic director and head football coach at Michigan State from 1921 to 1922, in Ocean City, New Jersey, at age 73
- March 30 - Chuck Bernard, All-American center at Michigan in 1932 and 1933, in Detroit at age 48
- April 7 - Thomas Read, former Republican lieutenant governor, attorney general, and candidate for governor, in Kalamazoo at age 80
- April 19 - Ron Finch, head football coach at Central Michigan from 1937 to 1946, in Mount Pleasant at age 59
- April 23 - Robert H. Clancy, Congressman between 1923 and 1933 and opponent of Prohibition, in Detroit at age 80
- June 28 - Mickey Cochrane, player-manager of the Detroit Tigers from 1934 to 1938, including the World Series champion 1935 team, in Lake Forest, Illinois, at age 59
- August 1 - Michael H. "Dad" Butler, former track coach and football trainer for the University of Detroit, in Detroit at age 92
- August 5 - Eugene Van Antwerp, former Mayor of Detroit, in Detroit at age 73
- August 7 - Matt Mann, swimming coach at the University of Michigan since 1921, at Camp Chikopi in Ontario at age 77
- August 11 - David M. Borden, chief automotive research engineer for Chrysler and developer of the company's gas-turbine engine, in Royal Oak at age 60
- September 4 - Fran Striker, creator of the Lone Ranger and Green Hornet who was affiliated for many years with WXYZ radio in Detroit, in an automobile crash near Buffalo, New York, at age 59
- September 14 - Frederick Schule, track star at the University of Michigan, gold medalist in 110 meter hurdles at 1904 Summer Olympics, in DeRuyter, New York, at age 82
- November 3 - Harlow Curtice, former president of General Motors and Time Man of the Year for 1955, in Flint at age 69
- December 7 - Bobo Newsom, baseball pitcher who compiled a 21–5 record in leading the 1940 Detroit Tigers to the American League penant, in Orlando, Florida, at age 55
- December 29 - Sam Dibert, bandleader, in Detroit at age 55

=== Gallery of 1962 deaths ===
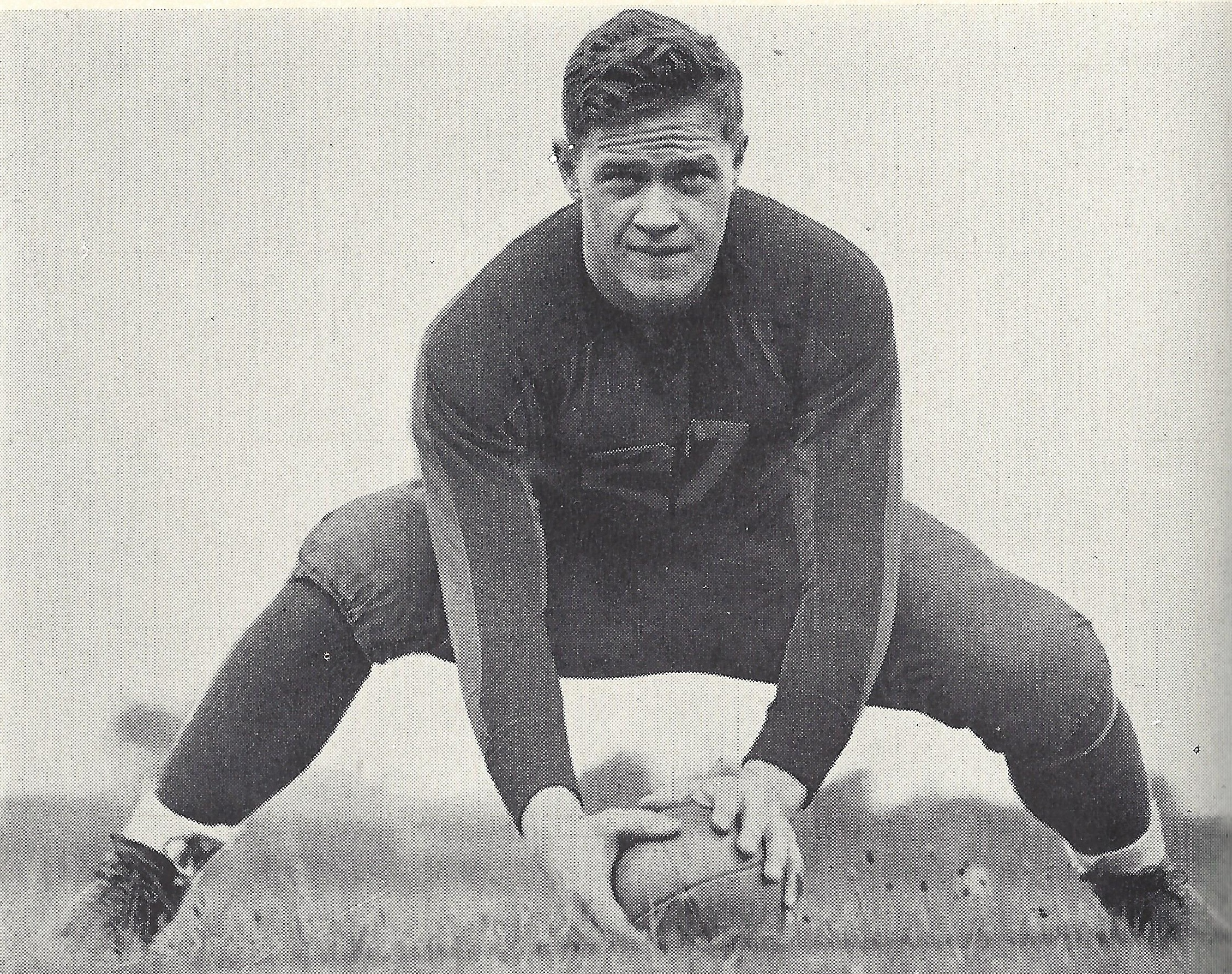
Chuck Bernard

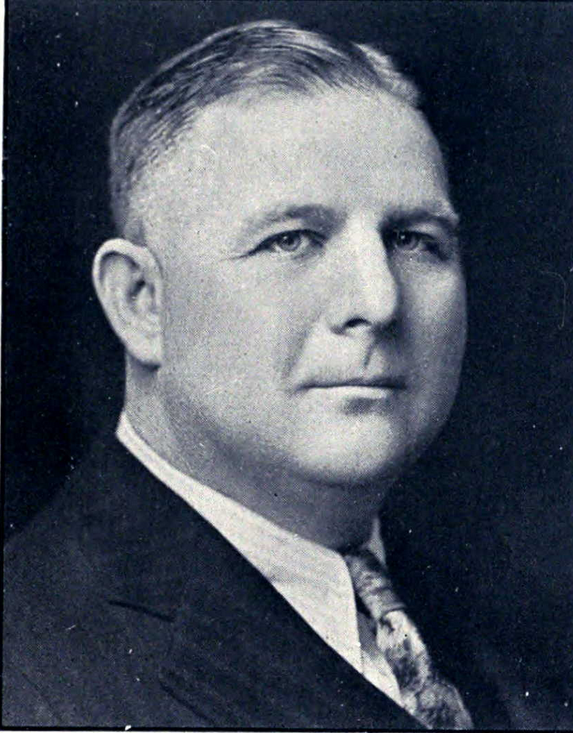
Ralph H. Young

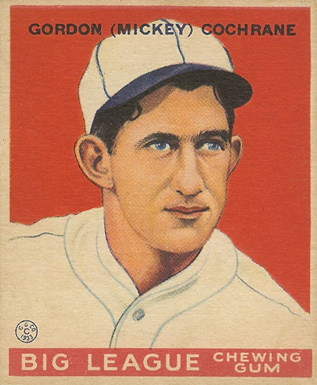
Mickey Cochrane

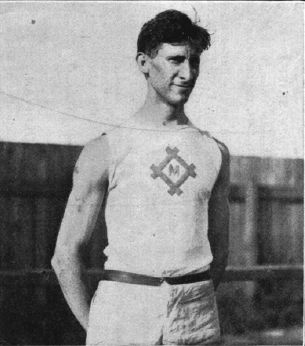
Frederick Schule

Matt Mann

== See also ==
- History of Michigan
- History of Detroit
