= Robert Tyrrell =

Robert Tyrrell may refer to:

- Robert Yelverton Tyrrell (1844–1914), Irish classical scholar
- Bob Tyrrell (tattoo artist) (born 1962), American tattoo artist
- Emmett Tyrrell or Bob Tyrell (born 1943), editor, author, and columnist
- Ken Tyrrell or Robert Kenneth Tyrrell (1924–2001), British Formula Two racing driver
