= Willis F. Woods =

American art museum director

Willis F. Woods was an American art museum director.

== Life ==
He was appointed director of the Detroit Institute of Arts in 1962. He left his position as director in 1973. He was executive director of the Seattle Art Museum, from 1974 to 1979. He was a founder of Friends of African and African American Art, at the Detroit Institute of Arts. He was director of the Norton Gallery, West Palm Beach.

His letters are held at the Archives of American Art.
