= Bob Tyrrell (tattoo artist) =

American tattoo artist (born 1962)

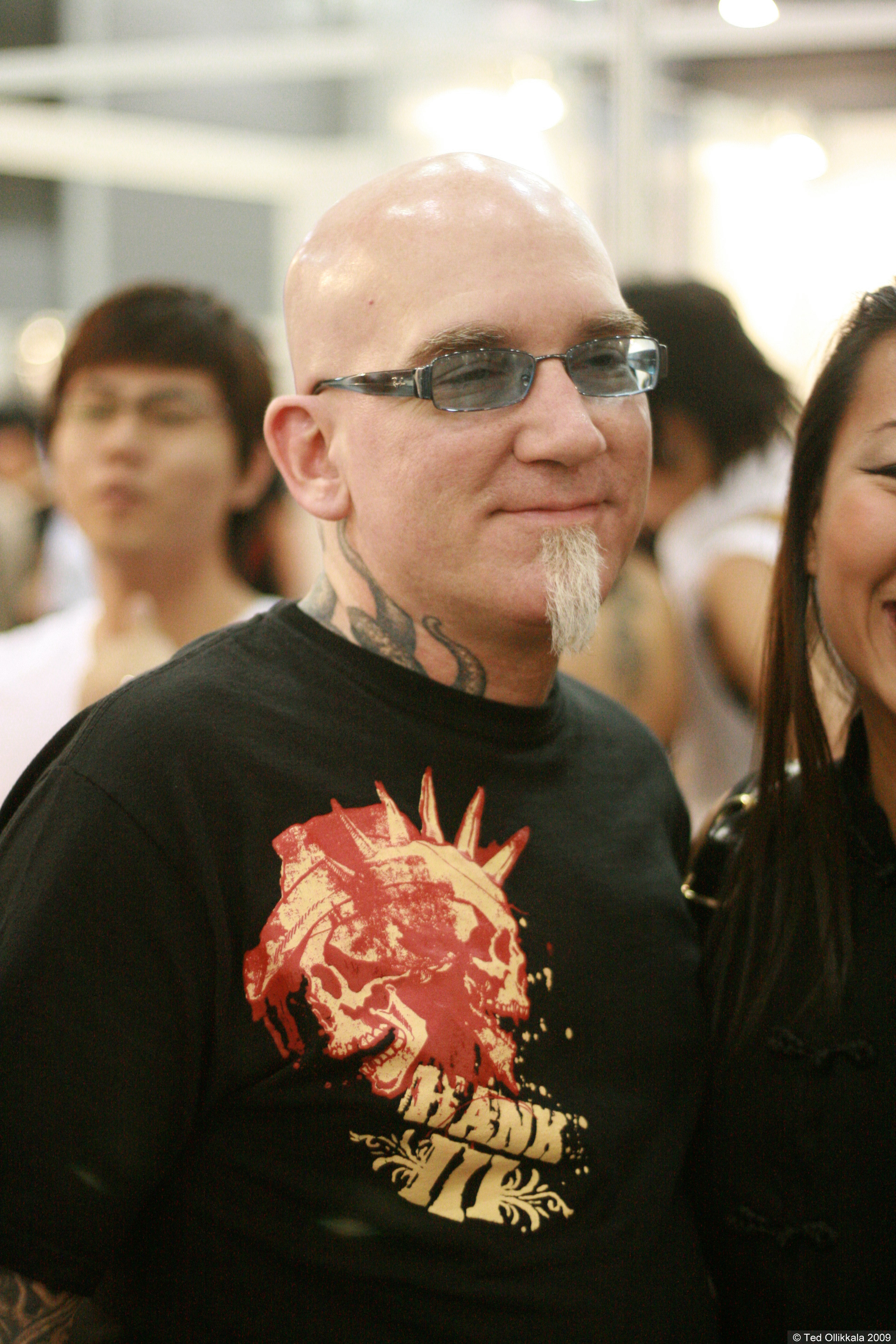
- Tyrrell in 2009 at Singapore tattoo convention.
- Born: November 4, 1962 (age 62); Detroit, Michigan, U.S.
- Occupation: Tattoo artist
- Website: www.bobtyrrell.com

Bob Tyrrell (born November 4, 1962) is an American tattoo artist. He is known for his black-and-gray tattooing style.

== Biography ==
Bob Tyrrell was born on November 4, 1962 in Detroit, Michigan. His father was an artist. He began tattooing in his early 30s. He apprenticed at Eternal Tattoos, a tattoo shop in Michigan.

He has been featured in LA Ink and London Ink. He became known for tattooing Kid Rock's back. In 2012, he participated as a jury member in the first Chaudesaigues Award, an award that recognizes the career and artwork of tattoo artists. In that year, he appeared on an episode of Ink Master as a special guest judge.

== Filmography ==
=== DVDs ===
- Method to My Madness (2014)
- Hair of the Dog (2017)
