= 1962 NBA Finals =

1962 basketball championship series

Team	Coach	Wins
Boston Celtics	Red Auerbach	4
Los Angeles Lakers	Fred Schaus	3
- Dates: April 7–18
- Hall of Famers: Celtics: Carl Braun (2019); Bob Cousy (1971); Tom Heinsohn (1986 as player, 2015 as coach); K. C. Jones (1989); Sam Jones (1984); Frank Ramsey (1982); Bill Russell (1975); Satch Sanders (2011, contributor); Lakers: Elgin Baylor (1977); Jerry West (1980); Coaches: Red Auerbach (1969); Officials: Mendy Rudolph (2007); Earl Strom (1995)
- Eastern finals: Celtics defeated Warriors, 4–3
- Western finals: Lakers defeated Pistons, 4–2

The 1962 NBA World Championship Series was the championship round of the 1962 NBA playoffs, which concluded the National Basketball Association (NBA)'s 1961–62 season. The best-of-seven series was played between the Western Division champion Los Angeles Lakers and Eastern Division champion Boston Celtics. This was the Celtics' sixth straight trip to the Finals, and they won the best-of-seven series in Game 7, 110–107 in overtime. It was the second time in NBA history and the most recent Finals in which the series was decided by overtime in Game 7. The only other Finals series decided in overtime in the seventh game was the 1957 Finals.

== Series summary ==
Game	Date	Home team	Result	Road team
Game 1	April 7	Boston Celtics	122–108 (1–0)	Los Angeles Lakers
Game 2	April 8	Boston Celtics	122–129 (1–1)	Los Angeles Lakers
Game 3	April 10	Los Angeles Lakers	117–115 (2–1)	Boston Celtics
Game 4	April 11	Los Angeles Lakers	103–115 (2–2)	Boston Celtics
Game 5	April 14	Boston Celtics	121–126 (2–3)	Los Angeles Lakers
Game 6	April 16	Los Angeles Lakers	105–119 (3–3)	Boston Celtics
Game 7	April 18	Boston Celtics	110–107 (OT) (4–3)	Los Angeles Lakers

Celtics win series 4–3

== Team rosters ==
=== Los Angeles Lakers ===
1961–62 Los Angeles Lakers roster
Players

Pos.	No.	Player	Height	Weight	DOB	From
SF	22	Elgin Baylor	6 ft 5 in (1.96 m)	225 lb (102 kg)	1934-09-16	Seattle
C	14	Ray Felix	6 ft 11 in (2.11 m)	220 lb (100 kg)	1930-12-10	Long Island
SF	20	Tom Hawkins	6 ft 5 in (1.96 m)	210 lb (95 kg)	1936-12-22	Notre Dame
SG	33	Hot Rod Hundley	6 ft 4 in (1.93 m)	185 lb (84 kg)	1934-10-26	West Virginia
PF	54	Howie Jolliff	6 ft 7 in (2.01 m)	218 lb (99 kg)	1938-07-20	Ohio
C	32	Jim Krebs	6 ft 8 in (2.03 m)	230 lb (104 kg)	1935-09-08	SMU
PF	35	Rudy LaRusso	6 ft 7 in (2.01 m)	220 lb (100 kg)	1937-11-11	Dartmouth
PG	52	Bob McNeill	6 ft 1 in (1.85 m)	170 lb (77 kg)	1938-10-22	Saint Joseph's
SG	11	Frank Selvy	6 ft 3 in (1.91 m)	180 lb (82 kg)	1932-11-09	Furman
PG	44	Jerry West	6 ft 3 in (1.91 m)	175 lb (79 kg)	1938-05-28	West Virginia
C	55	Wayne Yates	6 ft 8 in (2.03 m)	235 lb (107 kg)	1937-11-07	Memphis

Coaches
Head coach
- Fred Schaus

Legend
- (DP) Unsigned draft pick
- (FA) Free agent
- (S) Suspended
- Injured

Roster

== Box scores ==
April 7

Boxscore

Los Angeles Lakers 108, Boston Celtics 122
Scoring by quarter: 32–29, 20–31, 22–35, 34–27
Pts: Elgin Baylor 35; Rebs: Elgin Baylor 17; Asts: Jerry West 4	Pts: Sam Jones 24; Rebs: Bill Russell 28; Asts: Bob Cousy 7
Boston leads series, 1–0

Boston Garden, Boston, Massachusetts
Attendance: 7,467

April 8

Boxscore

Los Angeles Lakers 129, Boston Celtics 122
Scoring by quarter: 30–36, 43–23, 29–39, 27–24
Pts: Jerry West 40; Rebs: Jim Krebs 13; Asts: Frank Selvy 6	Pts: Tom Heinsohn 27; Rebs: Bill Russell 23; Asts: Bob Cousy 11
Series tied, 1–1

Boston Garden, Boston, Massachusetts
Attendance: 12,364

April 10

Boxscore

Boston Celtics 115, Los Angeles Lakers 117
Scoring by quarter: 27–24, 23–30, 28–33, 37–30
Pts: Bill Russell 26; Rebs: Bill Russell 32; Asts: Bob Cousy 8	Pts: Elgin Baylor 39; Rebs: Elgin Baylor 23; Asts: Frank Selvy 5
Los Angeles leads series, 2–1

Los Angeles Memorial Sports Arena, Los Angeles, California
Attendance: 15,180

- Jerry West steals Sam Jones' inbound pass and hit the game winning buzzer-beater.

April 11

Boxscore

Boston Celtics 115, Los Angeles Lakers 103
Scoring by quarter: 32–20, 28–31, 31–25, 24–27
Pts: Bill Russell 21; Rebs: Bill Russell 22; Asts: Bob Cousy 13	Pts: Elgin Baylor 38; Rebs: Elgin Baylor 14; Asts: Elgin Baylor 6
Series tied, 2–2

Los Angeles Memorial Sports Arena, Los Angeles, California
Attendance: 15,104

April 14

Boxscore

Los Angeles Lakers 126, Boston Celtics 121
Scoring by quarter: 31–30, 35–38, 27–31, 33–22
Pts: Elgin Baylor 61; Rebs: Elgin Baylor 22; Asts: Frank Selvy 5	Pts: Tom Heinsohn 30; Rebs: Bill Russell 29; Asts: Bob Cousy 10
Los Angeles leads series, 3–2

Boston Garden, Boston, Massachusetts
Attendance: 13,909

- Elgin Baylor's 61 points sets a Finals record for an individual scorer in a game.

April 16

Boxscore

Boston Celtics 119, Los Angeles Lakers 105
Scoring by quarter: 33–34, 24–31, 34–16, 28–24
Pts: Sam Jones 35; Rebs: Bill Russell 24; Asts: Bill Russell 10	Pts: West, Baylor 34 each Rebs: Elgin Baylor 15; Asts: West, LaRusso 5 each
Series tied, 3–3

Los Angeles Memorial Sports Arena, Los Angeles, California
Attendance: 14,030

April 18

Boxscore

Los Angeles Lakers 107, Boston Celtics 110 (OT)
Scoring by quarter: 22–22, 25–31, 28–22, 25–25, Overtime: 7–10
Pts: Elgin Baylor 41; Rebs: Elgin Baylor 22; Asts: three players 4 each	Pts: Bill Russell 30; Rebs: Bill Russell 40; Asts: Bob Cousy 9
Boston wins series, 4–3

Boston Garden, Boston, Massachusetts
Attendance: 13,909

Celtics center Bill Russell set a still-standing record for rebounds in a 7-game series with 189, and tied his own record for rebounds in a single game with 40 in Game 7. In the last 5 seconds of regulation in Game 7, Los Angeles’ Frank Selvy missed an open 12-footer from the baseline that would have won the championship for the Lakers and ended the Celtics dynasty. Instead, the game went into overtime in which the Celtics won the game and thus the title. For the Lakers, it would start the pattern of not winning the big games in the NBA Finals, something that lasted until 1972 when the Lakers finally won their first title in Los Angeles. The Lakers would not defeat the Celtics in the NBA Finals until 1985, where they clinched the title at Boston Garden; the Lakers would lose to the Celtics in the Finals in 1963, 1965, 1966, 1968, 1969, 1984 and 2008. After the 1985 Finals, the Lakers would beat the Celtics in the NBA Finals again in 1987 and 2010, both times in Los Angeles.

== See also ==
- 1962 NBA playoffs
- 1961–62 NBA season
