= 1961–62 Chicago Packers season =

NBA professional basketball team season

- Head coach: Jim Pollard
- General manager: Harry Hannin
- Owner: David Trager
- Arena: International Amphitheatre

Results
- Record: 18–62 (.225)
- Place: Division: 5th (Western)
- Playoff finish: Did not qualify
- Stats at Basketball Reference

Local media
- Television: WGN-TV(Jack Brickhouse)
- Radio: WTAQ(Jim Karvellas)

The 1961–62 Chicago Packers season was the Chicago Packers' 1st season in the NBA. It would also be their only season for the franchise under that name. They would be renamed the Chicago Zephyrs for the 1962–1963 season.

== Roster ==
1961–62 Chicago Packers roster
Players

Pos.	No.	Player	Height	Weight	DOB	From
C	8	Walt Bellamy	6 ft 11 in (2.11 m)	225 lb (102 kg)	1939-07-24	Indiana
PF	33	George Bon Salle	6 ft 8 in (2.03 m)	220 lb (100 kg)	1935-07-01	Illinois
PG	10	Howie Carl	5 ft 9 in (1.75 m)	160 lb (73 kg)	1938-06-07	DePaul
SG	25	Ralph Davis	6 ft 4 in (1.93 m)	180 lb (82 kg)	1938-09-07	Cincinnati
SG	16	Si Green	6 ft 2 in (1.88 m)	185 lb (84 kg)	1933-08-20	Duquesne
SF	12	Andy Johnson	6 ft 5 in (1.96 m)	215 lb (98 kg)	1932-11-08	Portland
PG	21	Slick Leonard	6 ft 3 in (1.91 m)	185 lb (84 kg)	1932-07-17	Indiana
PF	33	Dave Piontek	6 ft 6 in (1.98 m)	230 lb (104 kg)	1934-08-27	Xavier
PF	35	Woody Sauldsberry	6 ft 7 in (2.01 m)	220 lb (100 kg)	1934-07-11	Texas Southern
SG	22	Jack Turner	6 ft 5 in (1.96 m)	200 lb (91 kg)	1939-06-05	Louisville
PF	14	Charlie Tyra	6 ft 8 in (2.03 m)	230 lb (104 kg)	1935-08-16	Louisville
SF	15	Horace Walker	6 ft 3 in (1.91 m)	210 lb (95 kg)	1937-04-17	Michigan State

Coaches
Head coach
- Jim Pollard

Legend
- (DP) Unsigned draft pick
- (FA) Free agent
- (S) Suspended
- Injured

Roster
Updated: December 28, 1961

== Regular season ==
=== Season standings ===
Western Division	W	L	PCT	GB	Home	Road	Neutral	Div
x-Los Angeles Lakers	54	26	.675	–	26–5	18–13	10–8	33–13
x-Cincinnati Royals	43	37	.538	11	18–13	14–16	11–8	29–17
x-Detroit Pistons	37	43	.463	17	16–14	8–17	13–12	24–22
St. Louis Hawks	29	51	.363	25	19–16	7–27	3–8	16–30
Chicago Packers	18	62	.225	36	15-23	3-39	0–0	10–30

- x – clinched playoff spot

=== Game log ===
#	Date	Opponent	Score	High points	Location	Record
1	October 19	@ New York	L 103–120	Walt Bellamy (29)		0–1
2	October 21	@ Syracuse	L 103–123	Walt Bellamy (29)		0–2
3	October 27	St. Louis	L 106–117	Walt Bellamy (35)		1–2
4	October 28	@ St. Louis	L 95–122	Bobby Leonard (22)		1–3
5	November 3	New York	L 118–129	Walt Bellamy (35)		2–3
6	November 4	Los Angeles	W 125–112	Walt Bellamy (28)		2–4
7	November 8	vs. New York	W 130–108	Walt Bellamy (23)		2–5
8	November 10	@ Cincinnati	L 117–122	Walt Bellamy (37)		2–6
9	November 11	Cincinnati	W 117–107	Walt Bellamy (45)		2–7
10	November 12	Boston	W 112–96	Archie Dees (18)		2–8
11	November 13	@ Los Angeles	L 113–127	Walt Bellamy (30)		2–9
12	November 15	@ Los Angeles	L 118–133	Walt Bellamy (28)		2–10
13	November 18	@ Detroit	L 112–119	Bobby Leonard (27)		2–11
14	November 19	Philadelphia	W 122–114	Vernon Hatton (25)		2–12
15	November 21	@ New York	W 109–107	Walt Bellamy (20)		3–12
16	November 25	@ Philadelphia	L 102–134	Walt Bellamy (27)		3–13
17	December 1	@ Boston	L 121–140	Walt Bellamy (33)		3–14
18	December 2	@ Syracuse	L 118–132	Andy Johnson (33)		3–15
19	December 5	vs. St. Louis	L 99–101	Horace Walker (26)		4–15
20	December 8	vs. Detroit	W 133–107	Walt Bellamy (23)		4–16
21	December 9	@ Philadelphia	L 113–135	Walt Bellamy (39)		4–17
22	December 10	vs. Philadelphia	W 118–109	Walt Bellamy (33)		4–18
23	December 11	vs. Cincinnati	W 133–117	Bobby Leonard (31)		4–19
24	December 13	vs. New York	L 112–113	Walt Bellamy (33)		5–19
25	December 14	vs. Boston	L 108–123	Walt Bellamy (41)		5–20
26	December 15	Los Angeles	L 94–97	Walt Bellamy (32)		6–20
27	December 16	Philadelphia	W 112–110	Walt Bellamy (45)		6–21
28	December 20	vs. Los Angeles	W 102–98	Walt Bellamy (36)		6–22
29	December 25	vs. Detroit	L 97–118	Walt Bellamy (35)		7–22
30	December 26	vs. Detroit	L 101–108	Walt Bellamy (30)		8–22
31	December 27	@ Detroit	L 93–121	Walt Bellamy (16)		8–23
32	December 29	St. Louis	W 120–103	Walt Bellamy (33)		8–24
33	December 30	@ St. Louis	L 92–101	Walt Bellamy (31)		8–25
34	January 2	Syracuse	W 127–102	Walt Bellamy (31)		8–26
35	January 6	@ Syracuse	L 102–120	Walt Bellamy (36)		8–27
36	January 7	vs. Cincinnati	W 123–113	Walt Bellamy (44)		8–28
37	January 9	vs. Cincinnati	W 113–106	Walt Bellamy (28)		8–29
38	January 10	Boston	L 90–103	Walt Bellamy (35)		9–29
39	January 12	Detroit	W 102–99	Walt Bellamy (27)		9–30
40	January 13	@ Philadelphia	L 117–135	Walt Bellamy (35)		9–31
41	January 18	vs. Syracuse	W 118–111	Walt Bellamy (27)		9–32
42	January 19	St. Louis	W 114–113	Walt Bellamy (35)		9–33
43	January 20	@ St. Louis	L 112–116	Walt Bellamy (31)		9–34
44	January 21	Los Angeles	W 112–111 (OT)	Walt Bellamy (48)		9–35
45	January 22	vs. New York	W 131–94	Walt Bellamy (21)		9–36
46	January 23	@ New York	W 109–103	Bobby Leonard (39)		10–36
47	January 24	vs. Philadelphia	W 122–108	Walt Bellamy (47)		10–37
48	January 25	New York	W 117–102	Walt Bellamy (36)		10–38
49	January 27	Syracuse	W 107–102	Walt Bellamy (45)		10–39
50	January 28	@ Los Angeles	L 109–124	Walt Bellamy (45)		10–40
51	January 30	@ Los Angeles	L 92–107	Walt Bellamy (32)		10–41
52	January 31	Boston	W 122–115	Walt Bellamy (47)		10–42
53	February 2	Detroit	L 96–112	Walt Bellamy (35)		11–42
54	February 3	vs. Detroit	W 116–109	Walt Bellamy (30)		11–43
55	February 4	Los Angeles	L 105–113	Walt Bellamy (33)		12–43
56	February 5	Boston	W 127–111	Walt Bellamy (34)		12–44
57	February 6	vs. Syracuse	W 127–123	Walt Bellamy (38)		12–45
58	February 10	vs. New York	L 111–126	Walt Bellamy (44)		13–45
59	February 11	@ Boston	L 115–148	Walt Bellamy (28)		13–46
60	February 13	vs. Boston	L 117–138	Walt Bellamy (36)		13–47
61	February 14	vs. Cincinnati	L 121–125	Walt Bellamy (38)		14–47
62	February 15	Syracuse	L 121–126	Walt Bellamy (31)		15–47
63	February 16	vs. Syracuse	W 132–106	Woody Sauldsberry (23)		15–48
64	February 17	vs. Syracuse	W 136–127	Walt Bellamy (33)		15–49
65	February 18	vs. Cincinnati	W 138–121	Walt Bellamy (30)		15–50
66	February 20	vs. Philadelphia	W 112–107	Walt Bellamy (44)		15–51
67	February 21	Cincinnati	W 153–125	Andy Johnson (29)		15–52
68	February 23	vs. Los Angeles	W 124–117 (OT)	Walt Bellamy (42)		15–53
69	February 24	St. Louis	L 119–129	Walt Bellamy (38)		16–53
70	February 25	@ Cincinnati	L 105–108	Bellamy, Sauldsberry (26)		16–54
71	February 27	vs. Boston	L 100–115	Andy Johnson (32)		16–55
72	February 28	Philadelphia	W 128–119	Andy Johnson (29)		16–56
73	March 3	Cincinnati	W 126–119	Walt Bellamy (23)		16–57
74	March 4	vs. Detroit	W 133–116	Andy Johnson (21)		16–58
75	March 8	Boston	W 108–102	Walt Bellamy (31)		16–59
76	March 9	vs. St. Louis	W 124–120	Walt Bellamy (30)		16–60
77	March 10	New York	L 116–128	Walt Bellamy (33)		17–60
78	March 12	vs. Detroit	W 121–116	Walt Bellamy (31)		17–61
79	March 13	@ St. Louis	W 124–118	Bellamy, Sauldsberry (29)		18–61
80	March 14	Philadelphia	W 119–115 (OT)	Walt Bellamy (38)		18–62

== Awards and records ==
- Walt Bellamy, NBA Rookie of the Year Award
