= 1961–62 Detroit Pistons season =

NBA team season

- Head coach: Dick McGuire
- Owner: Fred Zollner
- Arena: Cobo Arena

Results
- Record: 37–43 (.463)
- Place: Division: 3rd (Western)
- Playoff finish: West Division Finals (Lost to Lakers 2–4)
- Stats at Basketball Reference

Local media
- Television: WJBK
- Radio: WXYZ

The 1961–62 Detroit Pistons season was the Detroit Pistons' 14th season in the NBA and fifth season in the city of Detroit. The team moved to newly built Cobo Arena in the 1961–62 season.

The Pistons were led by guard Gene Shue (19.0 ppg, 5.8 apg, NBA All-Star) and forward Bailey Howell (19.9 ppg, 12.6 rpg). The Pistons also featured rookie Ray Scott (13.3 ppg, 11.5 rpg), who would go on to a long career with the Pistons as a player and eventually coaching the team. For the thirteenth straight season, the Pistons made the playoffs, with this being the seventh time they finished third place in the Western Division. Detroit faced the Cincinnati Royals and star Oscar Robertson in the Western Division semifinals; the Pistons won in four games to advance to the Division Finals for the first time in four years, facing the Los Angeles Lakers. The Lakers beat the Pistons in six games. While the Pistons would make the postseason the following year, this was the last postseason series victory for the Pistons until 1976.

== Regular season ==
=== Season standings ===
Western Division	W	L	PCT	GB	Home	Road	Neutral	Div
x-Los Angeles Lakers	54	26	.675	–	26–5	18–13	10–8	33–13
x-Cincinnati Royals	43	37	.538	11	18–13	14–16	11–8	29–17
x-Detroit Pistons	37	43	.463	17	16–14	8–17	13–12	24–22
St. Louis Hawks	29	51	.363	25	19–16	7–27	3–8	16–30
Chicago Packers	18	62	.225	36	15-23	3-39	0–0	10–30

x – clinched playoff spot

=== Game log ===
1961–62 Game log
#	Date	Opponent	Score	High points	Record
1	October 21	@ Boston	L 102–137	Gene Shue (17)	0–1
2	October 25	Los Angeles	L 116–120	Bailey Howell (33)	0–2
3	October 27	@ Los Angeles	L 118–128	Lee, Shue (22)	0–3
4	October 28	@ Los Angeles	L 126–135	Bob Ferry (29)	0–4
5	November 1	New York	W 111–95	Bob Ferry (21)	1–4
6	November 4	@ Philadelphia	L 132–135	Gene Shue (28)	1–5
7	November 8	Philadelphia	L 128–132	Don Ohl (27)	1–6
8	November 9	vs. Boston	W 116–110	Don Ohl (29)	2–6
9	November 10	@ New York	W 124–118	Gene Shue (32)	3–6
10	November 11	@ St. Louis	L 119–132	Gene Shue (22)	3–7
11	November 15	St. Louis	W 127–122	Bailey Howell (30)	4–7
12	November 18	Chicago	W 119–112	Bob Ferry (25)	5–7
13	November 19	vs. Cincinnati	L 112–128	Gene Shue (28)	5–8
14	November 21	vs. Los Angeles	W 108–102	Gene Shue (22)	6–8
15	November 24	vs. St. Louis	W 142–135	Don Ohl (36)	7–8
16	November 25	Los Angeles	W 104–103	Bob Ferry (22)	8–8
17	November 26	Boston	L 101–107	Don Ohl (20)	8–9
18	November 28	vs. Boston	L 108–116	Ray Scott (20)	8–10
19	December 1	@ St. Louis	L 116–119	Gene Shue (30)	8–11
20	December 2	St. Louis	W 118–109	Bailey Howell (33)	9–11
21	December 6	New York	W 133–97	Johnny Egan (19)	10–11
22	December 8	vs. Chicago	W 133–107	Walter Dukes (21)	11–11
23	December 9	Los Angeles	L 107–114	Bailey Howell (23)	11–12
24	December 12	vs. Philadelphia	L 109–132	Don Ohl (28)	11–13
25	December 14	@ Cincinnati	W 107–103	Bailey Howell (25)	12–13
26	December 16	Cincinnati	L 110–121	Bailey Howell (20)	12–14
27	December 17	vs. Los Angeles	L 116–122	Gene Shue (21)	12–15
28	December 19	vs. Syracuse	L 111–124	Bailey Howell (21)	12–16
29	December 20	Philadelphia	L 102–117	Ferry, Ohl (19)	12–17
30	December 23	vs. Cincinnati	W 134–125	Gene Shue (27)	13–17
31	December 25	vs. Chicago	L 97–118	Gene Shue (20)	13–18
32	December 26	vs. Chicago	L 101–108	Gene Shue (26)	13–19
33	December 27	Chicago	W 121–93	Gene Shue (26)	14–19
34	December 29	@ Cincinnati	W 131–116	Gene Shue (25)	15–19
35	December 30	@ Syracuse	L 108–109	Don Ohl (31)	15–20
36	January 1	St. Louis	L 139–145	Don Ohl (27)	15–21
37	January 2	@ New York	L 104–110	Bailey Howell (24)	15–22
38	January 3	Boston	W 112–103	Gene Shue (22)	16–22
39	January 5	vs. Syracuse	W 138–135 (OT)	Bailey Howell (35)	17–22
40	January 6	vs. New York	L 111–115	Bob Ferry (20)	17–23
41	January 9	vs. St. Louis	W 122–113	Gene Shue (24)	18–23
42	January 10	Philadelphia	L 110–113	Don Ohl (20)	18–24
43	January 12	@ Chicago	W 102–99	Gene Shue (25)	19–24
44	January 13	Cincinnati	L 112–119	Ray Scott (29)	19–25
45	January 14	vs. Los Angeles	W 118–108	Gene Shue (32)	20–25
46	January 17	Boston	L 116–126	Bailey Howell (35)	20–26
47	January 19	vs. Philadelphia	L 125–136	Bailey Howell (27)	20–27
48	January 20	@ Philadelphia	L 107–123	Gene Shue (23)	20–28
49	January 21	@ Boston	W 124–120	Gene Shue (30)	21–28
50	January 22	vs. Cincinnati	L 106–115	Bailey Howell (21)	21–29
51	January 24	Syracuse	W 111–102	Don Ohl (25)	22–29
52	January 25	vs. Syracuse	W 101–100	Ray Scott (20)	23–29
53	January 27	New York	W 115–107	Bailey Howell (28)	24–29
54	January 28	@ St. Louis	L 97–110	Don Ohl (21)	24–30
55	January 31	Los Angeles	L 122–123 (OT)	Bailey Howell (27)	24–31
56	February 2	@ Chicago	L 96–112	Bob Ferry (20)	24–32
57	February 3	vs. Chicago	W 116–109	Gene Shue (28)	25–32
58	February 4	St. Louis	W 121–113	Gene Shue (30)	26–32
59	February 6	@ Cincinnati	W 119–118	Gene Shue (27)	27–32
60	February 7	Cincinnati	W 113–107	Bailey Howell (29)	28–32
61	February 11	@ Syracuse	L 116–132	Don Ohl (24)	28–33
62	February 14	Philadelphia	W 119–110	Don Ohl (26)	29–33
63	February 16	Los Angeles	W 127–121	Don Ohl (27)	30–33
64	February 17	@ Cincinnati	W 123–113	Don Ohl (25)	31–33
65	February 18	St. Louis	W 119–112	Don Ohl (30)	32–33
66	February 20	@ New York	L 103–110	Bailey Howell (26)	32–34
67	February 21	@ St. Louis	W 126–123	Ohl, Shue (27)	33–34
68	February 23	Cincinnati	L 120–134	Bailey Howell (27)	33–35
69	February 25	@ Los Angeles	L 99–128	Scott, Shue (16)	33–36
70	February 27	@ Los Angeles	L 100–107	Bailey Howell (28)	33–37
71	February 28	vs. New York	L 109–119	Howell, Shue (23)	33–38
72	March 2	vs. Cincinnati	L 112–120	Bailey Howell (22)	33–39
73	March 3	Syracuse	L 114–128	Bailey Howell (25)	33–40
74	March 4	vs. Chicago	W 133–116	Dukes, Howell, Ohl (21)	34–40
75	March 7	vs. New York	W 119–112	Bailey Howell (31)	35–40
76	March 9	Boston	L 111–130	Johnny Egan (20)	35–41
77	March 10	@ Syracuse	L 111–128	Bailey Howell (21)	35–42
78	March 11	@ St. Louis	L 123–126	Shue, Scott (24)	35–43
79	March 12	vs. Chicago	W 121–116	Bailey Howell (29)	36–43
80	March 14	Syracuse	W 105–102	Ray Scott (28)	37–43

== Playoffs ==
1962 playoff game log
Division Semifinals: 3–1 (home: 2–0; road: 1–1)

Game	Date	Team	Score	High points	Location	Series
1	March 16	Cincinnati	W 123–122	Ray Scott (34)	Cobo Arena	1–0
2	March 17	@ Cincinnati	L 107–129	Ohl, Shue (18)	Cincinnati Gardens	1–1
3	March 18	Cincinnati	W 118–107	Bailey Howell (27)	Cobo Arena	2–1
4	March 20	@ Cincinnati	W 112–111	Don Ohl (33)	Cincinnati Gardens	3–1

Division Finals: 2–4 (home: 1–2; road: 1–2)

Game	Date	Team	Score	High points	High rebounds	Location	Series
1	March 24	@ Los Angeles	L 108–132	Bailey Howell (27)	Walter Dukes (12)	Los Angeles Memorial Sports Arena	0–1
2	March 25	@ Los Angeles	L 112–127	Don Ohl (33)	Bailey Howell (13)	Los Angeles Memorial Sports Arena	0–2
3	March 27	Los Angeles	L 106–111	Gene Shue (26)	Walter Dukes (25)	Cobo Arena	0–3
4	March 29	Los Angeles	W 118–117	Bailey Howell (24)	Ray Scott (23)	Cobo Arena	1–3
5	March 31	@ Los Angeles	W 132–125	Willie Jones (27)	Ray Scott (13)	Los Angeles Memorial Sports Arena	2–3
6	April 3	Los Angeles	L 117–123	Ray Scott (22)	—	Cobo Arena	2–4

1962 schedule

== See also ==
- 1962 in Michigan
