= Frank Selvy =

American basketball player (1932–2024)

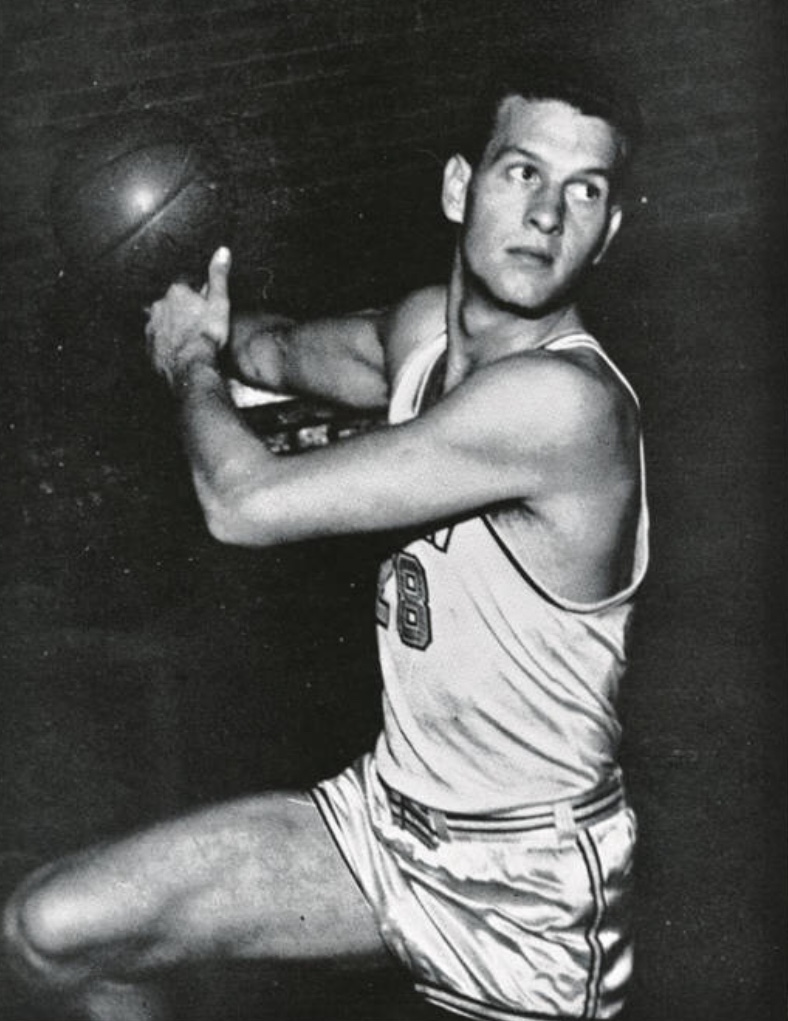
- Selvy in 1954

Personal information
- Born: November 9, 1932 Corbin, Kentucky, U.S.
- Died: August 13, 2024 (aged 91) Simpsonville, South Carolina, U.S.
- Listed height: 6 ft 3 in (1.91 m)
- Listed weight: 180 lb (82 kg)

Career information
- High school: Corbin (Corbin, Kentucky)
- College: Furman (1951–1954)
- NBA draft: 1954: 1st round, 1st overall pick
- Drafted by: Baltimore Bullets
- Playing career: 1954–1964
- Position: Shooting guard / small forward
- Number: 13, 28, 19, 11, 15, 70
- Coaching career: 1964–1970

Career history

Playing
- 1954: Baltimore Bullets
- 1954–1958: Milwaukee / St. Louis Hawks
- 1958: Minneapolis Lakers
- 1958–1959: New York Knicks
- 1959: Syracuse Nationals
- 1959–1964: Minneapolis / Los Angeles Lakers

Career highlights
- 2× NBA All-Star (1955, 1962); Consensus first-team All-American (1954); Consensus second-team All-American (1953); 2× NCAA scoring champion (1953, 1954); 2× SoCon Player of the Year (1953, 1954); No. 28 retired by Furman Paladins

Career statistics
- Points: 6,120 (10.8 ppg)
- Rebounds: 2,097 (3.7 rpg)
- Assists: 1,569 (2.8 apg)
- Stats at NBA.com
- Stats at Basketball Reference
- Collegiate Basketball Hall of Fame

Franklin Delano Selvy (November 9, 1932 – August 13, 2024) was an American National Basketball Association (NBA) player who was best known for holding the record for the most points (100) in a Division I college basketball game. Born in Corbin, Kentucky, Selvy was an All-State basketball player at Corbin High School and was a teammate of College Football Hall of Fame inductee Roy Kidd. Selvy was the No. 1 overall pick in the 1954 NBA draft and was a two-time NBA All-Star, playing nine seasons.

== Early life ==
Selvy was born on November 9, 1932, in Corbin, Kentucky to John Robert Selvy, a coal miner from ages 12–54, and Iva Selvy. He was named after Franklin Delano Roosevelt, who had been elected President of the United States the day before Selvy was born. He was one of ten children living in a two-bedroom home. At only 12 years old, Selvy was a summer migrant worker in Indiana, picking tomatoes. Selvy attended Corbin High School where he starred in basketball, even though his playing time was limited because he had to work. He played basketball for coach Harry Taylor, as did older brother Curt and younger brother Edd. He was the Most Valuable Player (MVP) in a number of high school all-star games.

== College career ==
After a storied career at Corbin High School, Selvy attended Furman University, where he was two-time Southern Conference Player of the Year, and a two-time All American. Selvy, chose Furman after Kentucky's Adolph Rupp and Western Kentucky's E.A. Diddle refused him scholarships, due to his then-six-foot (1.83 m) height and small frame.

After Selvy grew three inches and was named MVP in the Kentucky East-West All-Star Game, Kentucky offered a scholarship, but Selvy had committed to play at Furman. "I liked Coach [Lyles] Alley," Selvy said. "He came up and talked to my mother. Plus there were two or three guys from Corbin High who came along with me."

In 1951–52, Selvy averaged 24.6 points per game as Furman finished 18–6 under Coach Lyles Alley. In 1952–53, Selvy averaged 29.5 points as Furman finished 21–6.

As a senior in 1953–54, Selvy led the NCAA in scoring for the second season in a row, scoring 1,209 points (averaging 41.7 points per game), as Furman finished 20–9. His 41.7 points per game remained a record until Pete Maravich averaged 43.8 points per game at Louisiana State University in the 1967–68 season. Maravich would go on to break his own scoring records in the following two seasons (44.2 and 44.5 points per game), and remains the only person to average more than Selvy in a season in men's Division I basketball.

Overall, in 78 career games, Selvy averaged 32.5 points at Furman.

=== 100-point college game ===
Selvy is best remembered for scoring 100 points in a college game for Furman University against Newberry College on February 13, 1954, the only NCAA Division I player ever to do so. (Jack Taylor of Division III Grinnell College holds the NCAA all-time record for points scored at 138.) Selvy's 100-point game was played towards the end of his final collegiate season on a night that Furman coach Lyles Alley had designated the game "Frank Selvy Night." The special night was planned to garner recognition for Selvy, who was already certain to finish the season leading the nation in scoring and earn first-team All-American honors, two accomplishments he had attained the year before.

The game was the first to be broadcast live on television in South Carolina (where Furman is located and where the game was being played) and a large contingent from Selvy's hometown, including his family, had made the six-hour trek just for the occasion. It was actually the first college game his mother saw him play. The instructions from Coach Alley were simply to get the ball to Selvy so he can score as much as possible. Selvy obliged, hitting 41 of 66 field goals and 18 of 22 free throws, his last two points coming on a desperate heave near midcourt at the buzzer. (The game was played well before the introduction of the three-point line; Selvy later estimated that eight or nine of his shots that day would have been three-pointers today.) This was the only game of his that Selvy's mother ever attended.

== NBA career ==
Selvy was drafted first overall by the Baltimore Bullets in the 1954 NBA draft. He went on to play nine seasons in the National Basketball Association during the late 1950s and early 1960s, interrupted by a stint in the U.S. Army. As a professional, Selvy was mostly known for his time with the Los Angeles Lakers, teaming with Jerry West and Elgin Baylor. He was twice an NBA All-Star.

Drafted No. 1 overall by the Bullets, Selvy quickly moved to the Milwaukee Hawks on November 28, 1954, as the Baltimore franchise was folded. Selvy was drafted by Milwaukee in the dispersal draft of Baltimore players. Selvy averaged 19.0 points as a rookie as the Hawks finished 29–46 under Red Holzman.

The Hawks moved to St. Louis, Missouri in 1955–56 and Selvy averaged 11.0 points, as future Naismith Hall of Fame inductee Bob Pettit became the centerpiece of the 33–39 Hawks. Selvy then missed the 1956–57 season to military service with the U.S. Army.

In 1957–58, Selvy played a reserve role, averaging only 7.5 minutes per game in 26 games, as the St. Louis Hawks captured the 1958 NBA Championship, defeating the Boston Celtics in six games. Selvy missed a ring, as he was traded on February 16, 1958, by the Hawks to the Minneapolis Lakers for Dick Boushka and Terry Rand.

Selvy then played for the New York Knicks in 1958–59, averaging 9.8 points per game.

In the 1959–60 season, Selvy was waived by the Knicks on October 25, 1959, and quickly picked up on October 28, 1959, by the Syracuse Nationals. Then, on December 15, 1959, Selvy was sold by Syracuse to the Minneapolis Lakers. Subsequently, Selvy remained with the Lakers for the last five seasons of his career. He averaged 10.7 points for the Lakers in their last season in Minneapolis. Selvy was one of the Lakers on the plane that crashed in an Iowa cornfield in 1960, during a blinding snowstorm. In 1960–61, Selvy averaged 10.8 points in the first season in Los Angeles, playing alongside Elgin Baylor and Jerry West, as the team advanced to the Western Division Finals.

In 1961–62, the Lakers finished 54–26 as Selvy averaged 14.7 points. They advanced to the 1962 NBA Finals, losing to the Boston Celtics in seven games. Selvy averaged 12.1 points, 4.7 rebounds, and 4.0 assists in the Finals.

The Lakers advanced to the NBA Finals again in 1962–63, with Selvy averaging 10.3 points, 3.6 rebounds, and 3.5 assists per game. They lost to the Celtics in six games, with Selvy averaging 7.5 points in the series.

Selvy averaged 10.8 points, 3.7 rebounds, and 2.8 assists in his nine-season NBA Career and played in the 1955 and 1962 NBA All-Star Games.

=== 1962 NBA Finals, Game 7 ===
Selvy's best known game in the NBA was probably Game 7 of the 1962 NBA Finals in which he almost defeated the Celtics. Selvy's Lakers faced a four-point deficit at the hands of the Boston Celtics in the final minute of the game's fourth quarter. Selvy proceeded to secure two crucial rebounds and score two baskets in 20 seconds to tie the game at 100. With 5 seconds left, Selvy inbounded the pass at midcourt to Rodney "Hot Rod" Hundley, who dribbled to the top of the key. He pump-faked a pass to Jerry West, who was covered, then passed back to an open Selvy in the left corner. "I had one thought in my mind when the ball came to me: 'Do I take the shot?' I was wide open," Hundley recalled. "I thought, 'If I make it, I'll be the mayor of L.A. But if I miss, they'll be riding me out of town on a rail.' So I elected to pass it to Frank."

However, Selvy lost his chance for the ultimate heroic moment as he missed a 12-foot jump shot right before the buzzer that would have secured the championship for the Lakers had it gone in. The miss sent the game to overtime, where the Celtics prevailed in this, the second of seven NBA Finals match-ups between Boston and Los Angeles over the course of eleven seasons. Selvy was proud of his two baskets in 20 seconds that tied the game, giving the Lakers a chance to win, but would typically only hear about the missed shot.

Selvy's missed shot gained greater significance over the following years, as the Lakers ultimately lost each of their championship matchups with the Celtics during that period. thus magnifying the pain of Los Angeles having lost an opportunity, with Selvy's shot, to end that streak before it had even begun. (The Lakers, while still playing in Minneapolis, had lost to the Celtics in the NBA Finals in 1959, as well, though Selvy was not on that team).

Selvy's miss meant that Hundley's sacrifice had been for nought and that Hundley would never know if indeed he would have won the championship himself, had he taken the shot he had available. Because of this, Hundley would occasionally call Selvy and, when Selvy answered the phone, Hundley would simply say, "Nice shot!" and then hang up. For his part, Selvy has expressed some degree of irritation at Hundley's teasing.

It was a fairly tough shot because I was almost on the baseline. But I would trade all my points for that last basket.

— Frank Selvy as quoted on NBA.com

== Coaching career ==
After retiring from the NBA with multiple injuries, Selvy joined the Furman basketball staff as an assistant coach in 1964, under his former coach Lyles Alley.

Selvy was hired to replace Alley as head coach at Furman beginning in the 1966–67 season. His Furman teams finished 9–15, 13–14, 9–17 and 13–13 in his four seasons. His brother, Charles Selvy, was a top player on his Furman teams. He was replaced as head coach by Joe Williams in 1970. Overall, Selvy led Furman to a 44–59 mark.

== Personal life ==
Later, Selvy was employed for 25 years with the St. Joe Paper Company. In 2016, a biography of Selvy's life was published. He married Barbara A. Banks, Miss Arkansas of 1956 and winner of the talent division in that year's Ms. America Pageant, on April 15, 1959, in Conway, Arkansas. She had attended Louisiana State University with Bob Pettit, and Pettit introduced her to Selvy in 1958 while Pettit's Hawks were in New York playing against Selvy and the Knicks. Barbara Banks had been living in New York when she met Selvy, working as singer in television and theater, and as a model.

== Death ==
Selvy died at his home in Simpsonville, South Carolina, on the morning of August 13, 2024. He was 91.

== Career statistics ==
Legend
GP	Games played	GS	Games started	MPG	Minutes per game
FG%	Field goal percentage	3P%	3-point field goal percentage	FT%	Free throw percentage
RPG	Rebounds per game	APG	Assists per game	SPG	Steals per game
BPG	Blocks per game	PPG	Points per game	**Bold**	Career high
*	Led the league

=== NBA ===
==== Regular season ====
Year	Team	GP	MPG	FG%	FT%	RPG	APG	PPG
1954–55	Baltimore	11	**39.3**	.378	.730	**7.0**	2.7	**22.1**
1954–55	Milwaukee	60	37.3	.378	.727	5.3	3.6	18.4
1955–56	St. Louis	17	26.1	.366	.746	3.2	2.1	11.0
1957–58	St. Louis	26	7.5	.193	.563	2.0	.6	2.3
1957–58	Minneapolis	12	19.3	.333	.690	2.9	1.6	6.3
1958–59	New York	68	21.3	.385	**.767**	3.6	1.4	9.8
1959–60	Syracuse	19	11.4	.383	.646	2.5	1.6	5.4
1959–60	Minneapolis	43	25.4	.396	.763	3.0	1.9	10.7
1960–61	L.A. Lakers	77	28.0	.405	.753	3.9	3.2	10.8
1961–62	L.A. Lakers	79	35.5	.420	.738	5.2	**4.8**	14.7
1962–63	L.A. Lakers	**80***	29.6	**.424**	.714	3.6	3.5	10.3
1963–64	L.A. Lakers	73	17.6	.378	.639	1.9	2.0	5.5
Career		565	26.4	.394	.728	3.7	2.8	10.8
All-Star		2	15.0	.200	.750	3.5	1.0	3.5

==== Playoffs ====
Year	Team	GP	MPG	FG%	FT%	RPG	APG	PPG
1959	New York	2	21.5	**.500**	.818	2.0	1.5	14.5
1960	Minneapolis	9	36.7	.359	.705	**6.1**	3.2	**15.7**
1961	L.A. Lakers	12*	30.9	.387	.771	3.7	4.2	10.3
1962	L.A. Lakers	**13**	**36.8**	.434	.846	5.6	**5.0**	12.7
1963	L.A. Lakers	**13***	24.4	.395	.813	3.5	2.8	7.9
1964	L.A. Lakers	3	23.0	.481	**1.000**	1.7	2.0	9.3
Career		52	30.9	.403	.786	4.3	3.6	11.3

== Head coaching record ==
Record table
Season	Team	Overall	Conference	Standing	Postseason
Furman Paladins (Southern Conference) (1966–1970)
1966–67	Furman	9–15	4–6	7th	
1967–68	Furman	13–14	6–6	5th	
1968–69	Furman	9–17	5–6	5th	
1969–70	Furman	13–13	5–6	4th	
Furman:		44–59 (.427)	20–24 (.455)		
Total:		44–59 (.427)			
National champion Postseason invitational champion Conference regular season champion Conference regular season and conference tournament champion Division regular season champion Division regular season and conference tournament champion Conference tournament champion

== Honors ==
- Selvy was the 1954 United Press National Player of the Year.
- Consensus first-team All-American (1954)
- Consensus second-team All-American (1953)
- 2 × NCAA scoring champion (1953, 1954)
- 2 × SoCon Player of the Year (1953, 1954)
- Selvy was a 1955 and 1962 NBA All-Star.
- In 2009, Selvy was a charter member inducted into the Southern Conference Hall of Fame.
- Selvy was a charter member of the Furman Athletic Hall of Fame (1981).
- Selvy's jersey number 28 is retired at Furman.
- Selvy is listed on the "Naismith Memorial Basketball Hall of Fame Eligible Candidates" for the Class of 2019.
- A street in Corbin, Kentucky is named "Frank Selvy Way".
- The video boards in Timmons Arena at Furman University have "Frank Selvy" adorned on them.

== See also ==
- History of the Los Angeles Lakers
- List of basketball players who have scored 100 points in a single game
- List of NCAA Division I men's basketball players with 60 or more points in a game
- List of NCAA Division I men's basketball season scoring leaders
