= Frank Radovich =

American basketball player and coach

Personal information
- Born: March 3, 1938 (age 88) Hammond, Indiana, U.S.
- Listed height: 6 ft 8 in (2.03 m)
- Listed weight: 235 lb (107 kg)

Career information
- High school: Hammond (Hammond, Indiana)
- College: Indiana (1957–1960)
- NBA draft: 1960: 2nd round, 14th overall pick
- Drafted by: St. Louis Hawks
- Playing career: 1961–1962
- Position: Forward
- Number: 9

Career history

Playing
- 1961–1962: Philadelphia Warriors

Coaching
- 1967–1970: Georgia Southern
- 1971–1972: Indiana (GA)

Career NBA statistics
- Points: 87 (2.4 ppg)
- Rebounds: 51 (1.4 rpg)
- Assists: 4 (0.1 apg)
- Stats at NBA.com
- Stats at Basketball Reference

Frank Raymond Radovich (born March 3, 1938) is an American former professional basketball player and college coach. Radovich was selected in the 1960 NBA draft by the St. Louis Hawks after a collegiate career at Indiana. He played for the Philadelphia Warriors in the 1961–62 NBA season. Radovich later coached the Georgia Southern University men's basketball team from 1967 to 1970, compiling a 48–24 overall record. He later earned a master's degree at Indiana University where he also served as a graduate assistant coach for one season.

== Career playing statistics ==
Legend
GP	Games played	GS	Games started	MPG	Minutes per game
FG%	Field goal percentage	3P%	3-point field goal percentage	FT%	Free throw percentage
RPG	Rebounds per game	APG	Assists per game	SPG	Steals per game
BPG	Blocks per game	PPG	Points per game	**Bold**	Career high

=== NBA ===
==== Regular season ====
Year	Team	GP	MPG	FG%	FT%	RPG	APG	PPG
1961–62	Philadelphia	37	4.7	.398	.500	1.4	.1	2.4

=== Playoffs ===
Year	Team	GP	MPG	FG%	FT%	RPG	APG	PPG
1962	Philadelphia	2	6.0	.167	.500	1.5	.0	2.0

== Head coaching record ==
Record table
Season	Team	Overall	Conference	Standing	Postseason
**Georgia Southern Eagles** (NAIA independent) (1967–1969)
1967–68	Georgia Southern	13–11			
1968–69	Georgia Southern	18–7			
**Georgia Southern Eagles** (NCAA College Division independent) (1969–1970)
1969–70	Georgia Southern	17–6			NCAA College Division Second Round
Georgia Southern:		48–24			
Total:		48–24			
