= 1961–62 Philadelphia Warriors season =

NBA professional basketball team season

- Head coach: Frank McGuire
- Arena: Philadelphia Civic Center

Results
- Record: 49–31 (.613)
- Place: Division: 2nd (Eastern)
- Playoff finish: Division finals (lost to Celtics 3–4)
- Stats at Basketball Reference
- Radio: WCAU (Bill Campbell, Byrum Saam & Tommy Roberts)

The 1961–62 Philadelphia Warriors season was the sixteenth season for the National Basketball Association franchise in Philadelphia, and the last before their relocation to San Francisco, California, for the following season.

Wilt Chamberlain had the most statistically dominating season in NBA history. Chamberlain led the league with an NBA record 50.4 points per game. In one eight-day stretch in January, Chamberlain participated in three games in which he scored at least 63 points per game. On March 2, 1962, the Warriors played the New York Knicks in Hershey, Pennsylvania. Chamberlain had the most dominating performance in NBA history as he notched 100 points before 4,124 fans. The game was actually played at the Warriors' training facility. Despite his high scoring, Wilt did not win the NBA MVP that season. The award was given to Bill Russell. The Warriors finished second behind Russell's Boston Celtics with a 49–31 record. In the playoffs, the Warriors defeated the Syracuse Nationals in five games. Russell and Chamberlain met in the Eastern Division finals. The series went for the full seven games. In Game 7, the Celtics' Sam Jones hit the winning shot with 2 seconds remaining.

== Roster ==
1961–62 Philadelphia Warriors roster
Players

| Pos. | No. | Player | Height | Weight | DOB | From |
|---|---|---|---|---|---|---|
| F | 11 | Paul Arizin | 6 ft 4 in (1.93 m) | 190 lb (86 kg) | | Villanova |
| G | 16 | Al Attles | 6 ft 0 in (1.83 m) | 175 lb (79 kg) | | North Carolina A&T |
| C | 13 | Wilt Chamberlain | 7 ft 1 in (2.16 m) | 275 lb (125 kg) | | Kansas |
| G/F | 7 | Ed Conlin | 6 ft 5 in (1.96 m) | 200 lb (91 kg) | | Fordham |
| G/F | 15 | Tom Gola | 6 ft 6 in (1.98 m) | 205 lb (93 kg) | | La Salle |
| G | 34 | York Larese | 6 ft 4 in (1.93 m) | 183 lb (83 kg) | | North Carolina |
| F | 12 | Ted Luckenbill | 6 ft 6 in (1.98 m) | 205 lb (93 kg) | | Houston |
| F | 14 | Tom Meschery | 6 ft 6 in (1.98 m) | 215 lb (98 kg) | | Saint Mary's |
| F | 9 | Frank Radovich | 6 ft 8 in (2.03 m) | 235 lb (107 kg) | | Indiana |
| G | 5 | Guy Rodgers | 6 ft 0 in (1.83 m) | 185 lb (84 kg) | | Temple |
| F | 17 | Joe Ruklick | 6 ft 9 in (2.06 m) | 220 lb (100 kg) | | Northwestern |

Coaches
Head coach
- Frank McGuire (St. John's)

Legend
- (DP) Unsigned draft pick
- (FA) Free agent
- (S) Suspended
- Injured

== Regular season ==
Wilt Chamberlain's 100-point game, named by the National Basketball Association as one of its greatest games, took place between the Philadelphia Warriors and the New York Knicks on March 2, 1962, at Hersheypark Arena in Hershey, Pennsylvania.

The Warriors won the game, 169–147, setting what was then a record for the most combined points in a game by both teams. But the game is most remembered for the 100 points scored by Warriors center Wilt Chamberlain, who set the NBA single-game scoring record. The next leading scorer for Philadelphia was Al Attles with 17 points. The Knicks' leading scorer was Guerin with 39 points. In that game, Chamberlain also broke five other NBA scoring records, of which four still stand.

=== Season standings ===
| Eastern Division | W | L | PCT | GB | Home | Road | Neutral | Div |
|---|---|---|---|---|---|---|---|---|
| x-Boston Celtics | 60 | 20 | .750 | – | 23–5 | 26–12 | 11–3 | 26–10 |
| x-Philadelphia Warriors | 49 | 31 | .613 | 11 | 18–11 | 19–19 | 12–1 | 18–18 |
| x-Syracuse Nationals | 41 | 39 | .513 | 19 | 18–10 | 11–19 | 12–10 | 17–19 |
| New York Knicks | 29 | 51 | .363 | 31 | 19–15 | 2–23 | 8–13 | 11–25 |

=== Game log ===
1961–62 game log
| # | Date | Opponent | Score | High points | Record |
| 1 | October 19 | vs. Los Angeles | L 113–118 | Wilt Chamberlain (48) | 0–1 |
| 2 | October 20 | Los Angeles | W 122–115 | Wilt Chamberlain (57) | 1–1 |
| 3 | October 21 | New York | W 132–95 | Wilt Chamberlain (53) | 2–1 |
| 4 | October 27 | Syracuse | 126–122 | Wilt Chamberlain (55) | 2–2 |
| 5 | October 28 | @ Syracuse | 119–115 | Wilt Chamberlain (43) | 3–2 |
| 6 | November 3 | Boston | 112–98 | Wilt Chamberlain (28) | 3–3 |
| 7 | November 4 | Detroit | 132–135 | Wilt Chamberlain (58) | 4–3 |
| 8 | November 8 | @ Detroit | 132–128 | Wilt Chamberlain (58) | 5–3 |
| 9 | November 9 | Syracuse | 108–151 | Wilt Chamberlain (55) | 6–3 |
| 10 | November 11 | @ Boston | 125–128 | Wilt Chamberlain (41) | 6–4 |
| 11 | November 14 | @ New York | 122–124 | Wilt Chamberlain (34) | 6–5 |
| 12 | November 15 | Cincinnati | 133–145 | Wilt Chamberlain (43) | 7–5 |
| 13 | November 17 | Los Angeles | 125–121 | Wilt Chamberlain (56) | 7–6 |
| 14 | November 18 | @ Syracuse | 130–148 | Wilt Chamberlain (39) | 7–7 |
| 15 | November 19 | @ Chicago | 122–114 | Wilt Chamberlain (51) | 8–7 |
| 16 | November 21 | @ Cincinnati | 125–118 | Wilt Chamberlain (45) | 9–7 |
| 17 | November 23 | Boston | 119–106 | Wilt Chamberlain (31) | 9–8 |
| 18 | November 25 | Chicago | 102–134 | Wilt Chamberlain (39) | 10–8 |
| 19 | November 28 | @ St. Louis | 121–111 | Wilt Chamberlain (39) | 11–8 |
| 20 | December 1 | @ Los Angeles | 138–117 | Wilt Chamberlain (60) | 12–8 |
| 21 | December 2 | @ Los Angeles | 119–129 | Wilt Chamberlain (37) | 12–9 |
| 22 | December 5 | @ New York | 122–105 | Wilt Chamberlain (39) | 13–9 |
| 23 | December 6 | St. Louis | 137–132 | Wilt Chamberlain (39) | 13–10 |
| 24 | December 8 | Los Angeles | 151–147 (3OT) | Wilt Chamberlain (78) | 13–11 |
| 25 | December 9 | Chicago | 113–135 | Wilt Chamberlain (61) | 14–11 |
| 26 | December 10 | vs. Chicago | 118–109 | Wilt Chamberlain (55) | 15–11 |
| 27 | December 12 | vs. Detroit | 132–109 | Wilt Chamberlain (54) | 16–11 |
| 28 | December 13 | @ Boston | 113–123 | Wilt Chamberlain (52) | 16–12 |
| 29 | December 14 | Syracuse | 125–136 | Wilt Chamberlain (43) | 17–12 |
| 30 | December 16 | @ Chicago | 112–110 | Wilt Chamberlain (50) | 18–12 |
| 31 | December 19 | @ Cincinnati | 117–110 | Wilt Chamberlain (57) | 19–12 |
| 32 | December 20 | @ Detroit | 117–102 | Wilt Chamberlain (55) | 20–12 |
| 33 | December 25 | @ New York | 135–136 (2OT) | Wilt Chamberlain (59) | 20–13 |
| 34 | December 26 | vs. Syracuse | 111–118 | Wilt Chamberlain (51) | 21–13 |
| 35 | December 27 | New York | 119–131 | Wilt Chamberlain (53) | 22–13 |
| 36 | December 29 | vs. Los Angeles | 123–118 | Wilt Chamberlain (60) | 23–13 |
| 37 | December 30 | Boston | 116–111 (OT) | Wilt Chamberlain (41) | 23–14 |
| 38 | January 1 | @ Los Angeles | 111–114 | Wilt Chamberlain (32) | 23–15 |
| 39 | January 3 | @ Los Angeles | 123–124 | Wilt Chamberlain (36) | 23–16 |
| 40 | January 5 | St. Louis | 116–134 | Wilt Chamberlain (53) | 24–16 |
| 41 | January 7 | @ St. Louis | 112–137 | Wilt Chamberlain (55) | 24–17 |
| 42 | January 9 | Syracuse | 129–120 | Wilt Chamberlain (47) | 24–18 |
| 43 | January 10 | @ Detroit | 113–110 | Wilt Chamberlain (39) | 25–18 |
| 44 | January 11 | @ Cincinnati | 128–145 | Wilt Chamberlain (52) | 25–19 |
| 45 | January 13 | Chicago | 117–135 | Wilt Chamberlain (73) | 26–19 |
| 46 | January 14 | @ Boston | 136–145 | Wilt Chamberlain (62) | 26–20 |
| 47 | January 17 | vs. St. Louis | 130–136 (OT) | Wilt Chamberlain (62) | 27–20 |
| 48 | January 18 | Cincinnati | 151–133 | Wilt Chamberlain (54) | 27–21 |
| 49 | January 19 | vs. Detroit | 136–125 | Wilt Chamberlain (53) | 28–21 |
| 50 | January 20 | Detroit | 107–123 | Wilt Chamberlain (44) | 29–21 |
| 51 | January 21 | vs. Syracuse | 132–139 (OT) | Wilt Chamberlain (62) | 30–21 |
| 52 | January 24 | vs. Chicago | 122–108 | Wilt Chamberlain (55) | 31–21 |
| 53 | January 26 | vs. St. Louis | 110–136 | Wilt Chamberlain (47) | 32–21 |
| 54 | January 27 | Boston | 106–131 | Wilt Chamberlain (53) | 33–21 |
| 55 | January 28 | @ Boston | 133–129 (OT) | Wilt Chamberlain (50) | 34–21 |
| 56 | January 30 | @ New York | 110–116 | Wilt Chamberlain (55) | 34–22 |
| 57 | February 1 | Cincinnati | 109–130 | Wilt Chamberlain (53) | 35–22 |
| 58 | February 2 | vs. New York | 129–116 | Wilt Chamberlain (35) | 36–22 |
| 59 | February 3 | @ Syracuse | 112–134 | Wilt Chamberlain (41) | 36–23 |
| 60 | February 4 | Syracuse | 117–128 | Wilt Chamberlain (50) | 37–23 |
| 61 | February 8 | vs. New York | 136–120 | Wilt Chamberlain (59) | 38–23 |
| 62 | February 9 | @ Boston | 126–124 | Wilt Chamberlain (48) | 39–23 |
| 63 | February 10 | Boston | 106–107 | Wilt Chamberlain (38) | 40–23 |
| 64 | February 11 | @ New York | 121–111 | Wilt Chamberlain (42) | 41–23 |
| 65 | February 13 | @ Cincinnati | 132–152 | Wilt Chamberlain (65) | 41–24 |
| 66 | February 14 | @ Detroit | 110–119 | Wilt Chamberlain (42) | 41–25 |
| 67 | February 16 | Cincinnati | 132–136 | Wilt Chamberlain (48) | 42–25 |
| 68 | February 17 | @ St. Louis | 121–128 | Wilt Chamberlain (67) | 42–26 |
| 69 | February 20 | vs. Chicago | 112–107 | Wilt Chamberlain (48) | 43–26 |
| 70 | February 21 | @ Syracuse | 109–150 | Wilt Chamberlain (46) | 43–27 |
| 71 | February 22 | St. Louis | 121–139 | Wilt Chamberlain (61) | 44–27 |
| 72 | February 24 | Boston | 109–86 | Wilt Chamberlain (26) | 44–28 |
| 73 | February 25 | New York | 149–135 | Wilt Chamberlain (67) | 44–29 |
| 74 | February 27 | @ St. Louis | 147–137 | Wilt Chamberlain (65) | 45–29 |
| 75 | February 28 | @ Chicago | 128–119 | Wilt Chamberlain (61) | 46–29 |
| 76 | March 2 | New York | 169–147 | Wilt Chamberlain (100) | 47–29 |
| 77 | March 4 | @ New York | 129–128 | Wilt Chamberlain (58) | 48–29 |
| 78 | March 7 | @ Boston | 102–153 | Wilt Chamberlain (30) | 48–30 |
| 79 | March 11 | @ Syracuse | 130–148 | Wilt Chamberlain (44) | 48–31 |
| 80 | March 14 | @ Chicago | 119–115 (OT) | Wilt Chamberlain (34) | 49–31 |

== Player stats ==
Note: GP= Games played; MIN=Minutes; FG= Field Goals; FT= Free Throws; REB= Rebounds; AST= Assists; PTS = Points; AVG = Average

| = Indicates team leader |

| Player | GP | MIN | FG | FT | REB | AST | PTS |
|---|---|---|---|---|---|---|---|
| Wilt Chamberlain | 80 | 3882 | 1597 | 835 | 2052 | 192 | 4029 |
| Paul Arizin | | | | | | | |
| Tom Meschery | | | | | | | |
| Al Attles | | | | | | | |
| Tom Gola | | | | | | | |
| Guy Rodgers | 80 | 2648 | 267 | 121 | 348 | 643 | 655 |

== Playoffs ==
1962 playoff game log
Division Semi-finals: 3–2 (home: 2–1; road: 1–1)

| Game | Date | Team | Score | High points | High rebounds | High assists | Location Attendance | Series |
|---|---|---|---|---|---|---|---|---|
| 1 | March 16 | Syracuse | W 110–103 | Paul Arizin (43) | Wilt Chamberlain (25) | Guy Rodgers (8) | Philadelphia Civic Center; 6,937 | 1–0 |
| 2 | March 18 | @ Syracuse | W 97–82 | Wilt Chamberlain (28) | Wilt Chamberlain (26) | Wilt Chamberlain (4) | Onondaga War Memorial; 5,250 | 2–0 |
| 3 | March 19 | Syracuse | L 100–101 | Wilt Chamberlain (40) | Wilt Chamberlain (25) | Guy Rodgers (9) | Philadelphia Civic Center; 5,328 | 2–1 |
| 4 | March 20 | @ Syracuse | L 99–106 | Wilt Chamberlain (29) | Wilt Chamberlain (9) | Guy Rodgers (7) | Onondaga War Memorial | 2–2 |
| 5 | March 22 | Syracuse | W 121–104 | Wilt Chamberlain (56) | Wilt Chamberlain (35) | Guy Rodgers (10) | Philadelphia Civic Center; 7,829 | 3–2 |

Division finals: 3–4 (home: 3–0; road: 0–4)

| Game | Date | Team | Score | High points | High rebounds | High assists | Location | Series |
|---|---|---|---|---|---|---|---|---|
| 1 | March 24 | @ Boston | L 89–117 | Wilt Chamberlain (33) | Wilt Chamberlain (31) | Chamberlain, Arizin (3) | Boston Garden | 0–1 |
| 2 | March 27 | Boston | W 113–106 | Wilt Chamberlain (42) | Wilt Chamberlain (37) | Guy Rodgers (10) | Philadelphia Civic Center | 1–1 |
| 3 | March 28 | @ Boston | L 114–129 | Wilt Chamberlain (35) | Wilt Chamberlain (29) | Wilt Chamberlain (6) | Boston Garden | 1–2 |
| 4 | March 31 | Boston | W 110–106 | Wilt Chamberlain (41) | Wilt Chamberlain (34) | Guy Rodgers (10) | Philadelphia Civic Center | 2–2 |
| 5 | April 1 | @ Boston | L 104–119 | Wilt Chamberlain (30) | Wilt Chamberlain (14) | Guy Rodgers (9) | Boston Garden | 2–3 |
| 6 | April 3 | Boston | W 109–99 | Wilt Chamberlain (32) | Wilt Chamberlain (21) | Guy Rodgers (10) | Philadelphia Civic Center | 3–3 |
| 7 | April 5 | @ Boston | L 107–109 | Tom Meschery (32) | Wilt Chamberlain (22) | Guy Rodgers (8) | Boston Garden | 3–4 |

1962 schedule

== Awards and honors ==
- Wilt Chamberlain, NBA All-Star Game
- Paul Arizin, NBA All-Star Game
- Tom Gola, NBA All-Star Game
- Wilt Chamberlain, NBA scoring champion
- Wilt Chamberlain, All-NBA First Team
- Wilt Chamberlain, NBA Leader, Rebounds, 2,052
- Wilt Chamberlain, NBA Leader, Points per Game, 50.4
- Wilt Chamberlain, NBA Record, Most Points in One Game (see Wilt Chamberlain's 100-point game)

== Relocation to San Francisco ==
Following the season, the Warriors moved west to San Francisco after Edward Gottlieb sold the team to a Bay Area credit card company. Despite the loss, Philadelphia was without pro-basketball for just that one season. The Syracuse Nationals, who challenged the Warriors in the playoffs for many years, moved to Philadelphia in 1963, becoming the Philadelphia 76ers.
