= Willie Jones (basketball player) =

American basketball player (born 1936)

Personal information
- Born: June 29, 1936 (age 90)
- Listed height: 6 ft 3 in (1.91 m)
- Listed weight: 185 lb (84 kg)

Career information
- College: Northwestern (1957–1960)
- NBA draft: 1960: 5th round, 36th overall pick
- Drafted by: Detroit Pistons
- Playing career: 1960–1965
- Position: Point guard
- Number: 5

Career history
- 1960–1965: Detroit Pistons
- Stats at NBA.com
- Stats at Basketball Reference

William A. Jones (born June 29, 1936) is former NBA basketball player for the Detroit Pistons. Jones was drafted with the fourth pick in the fifth round of the 1960 NBA draft by the Pistons. In five seasons with the Pistons, Jones averaged 7.4 points per game, 2.0 assists per game and 2.8 rebounds per game.

== Career statistics ==
Legend
| GP | Games played | GS | Games started | MPG | Minutes per game |
| FG% | Field goal percentage | 3P% | 3-point field goal percentage | FT% | Free throw percentage |
| RPG | Rebounds per game | APG | Assists per game | SPG | Steals per game |
| BPG | Blocks per game | PPG | Points per game | **Bold** | Career high |

=== NBA ===
==== Regular season ====
| Year | Team | GP | MPG | FG% | FT% | RPG | APG | PPG |
|---|---|---|---|---|---|---|---|---|
| 1960–61 | Detroit | 35 | 12.9 | .361 | .635 | 2.7 | 1.8 | 5.6 |
| 1961–62 | Detroit | 69 | 14.6 | .373 | .634 | 2.6 | 1.7 | 6.1 |
| 1962–63 | Detroit | **79** | 18.6 | **.418** | **.720** | 2.9 | **2.4** | **9.2** |
| 1963–64 | Detroit | 77 | **20.0** | .390 | .709 | **3.3** | 2.2 | 8.2 |
| 1964–65 | Detroit | 12 | 8.4 | .404 | .333 | .8 | .6 | 3.7 |
| Career | | 272 | 16.8 | .393 | .682 | 2.8 | 2.0 | 7.4 |

==== Playoffs ====
| Year | Team | GP | MPG | FG% | FT% | RPG | APG | PPG |
|---|---|---|---|---|---|---|---|---|
| 1961 | Detroit | 3 | 13.3 | .414 | .857 | 2.3 | 2.0 | 10.0 |
| 1962 | Detroit | **9** | **20.0** | **.426** | **.929** | **2.6** | **3.4** | **11.0** |
| 1963 | Detroit | 4 | 16.8 | .393 | .750 | 1.8 | 1.5 | 7.0 |
| Career | | 16 | 17.9 | .418 | .862 | 2.3 | 2.7 | 9.8 |
