= Howie Jolliff =

American basketball player

Personal information
- Born: July 20, 1938 (age 88) Canton, Ohio, U.S.
- Listed height: 6 ft 7 in (2.01 m)
- Listed weight: 218 lb (99 kg)

Career information
- High school: Canton South (Canton, Ohio)
- College: Ohio (1957–1960)
- NBA draft: 1960: 7th round, 50th overall pick
- Drafted by: Minneapolis Lakers
- Playing career: 1960–1963
- Position: Power forward / center
- Number: 54

Career history
- 1960–1963: Los Angeles Lakers

Career highlights
- First-team All-MAC (1960)

Career NBA statistics
- Points: 388 (2.8 ppg)
- Rebounds: 586 (4.2 rpg)
- Assists: 112 (0.8 apg)
- Stats at NBA.com
- Stats at Basketball Reference

Howard "Howie" Jolliff (born July 20, 1938) is an American former professional basketball player. Jolliff was selected in the 1960 NBA draft by the Minneapolis Lakers after a collegiate career at Ohio University. In his NBA career, Jolliff averaged 2.8 points, 4.2 rebounds, and 0.8 assists per game while playing for the Lakers.

In 2010, ESPN ranked him as the "least productive player in Lakers history" among players who had played in at least 100 games for the team.

== Career statistics ==
Legend
GP	Games played	GS	Games started	MPG	Minutes per game
FG%	Field goal percentage	3P%	3-point field goal percentage	FT%	Free throw percentage
RPG	Rebounds per game	APG	Assists per game	SPG	Steals per game
BPG	Blocks per game	PPG	Points per game	**Bold**	Career high

=== NBA ===
==== Regular season ====
Year	Team	GP	MPG	FG%	FT%	RPG	APG	PPG
1960–61	L.A. Lakers	46	7.7	.326	.478	3.1	.3	2.2
1961–62	L.A. Lakers	**64**	**17.1**	**.411**	.526	**6.0**	**1.2**	**3.9**
1962–63	L.A. Lakers	28	10.5	.273	**.667**	2.2	.7	1.3
Career		138	12.6	.367	.527	4.2	.8	2.8

=== Playoffs ===
Year	Team	GP	MPG	FG%	FT%	RPG	APG	PPG
1961	L.A. Lakers	4	**8.8**	**.462**	–	**6.3**	**2.0**	**3.0**
1962	L.A. Lakers	**9**	8.6	.222	**1.000**	3.1	.8	1.3
Career		13	8.6	.364	1.000	4.1	1.2	1.8
