= Hot Rod Hundley =

American basketball player (1934–2015)

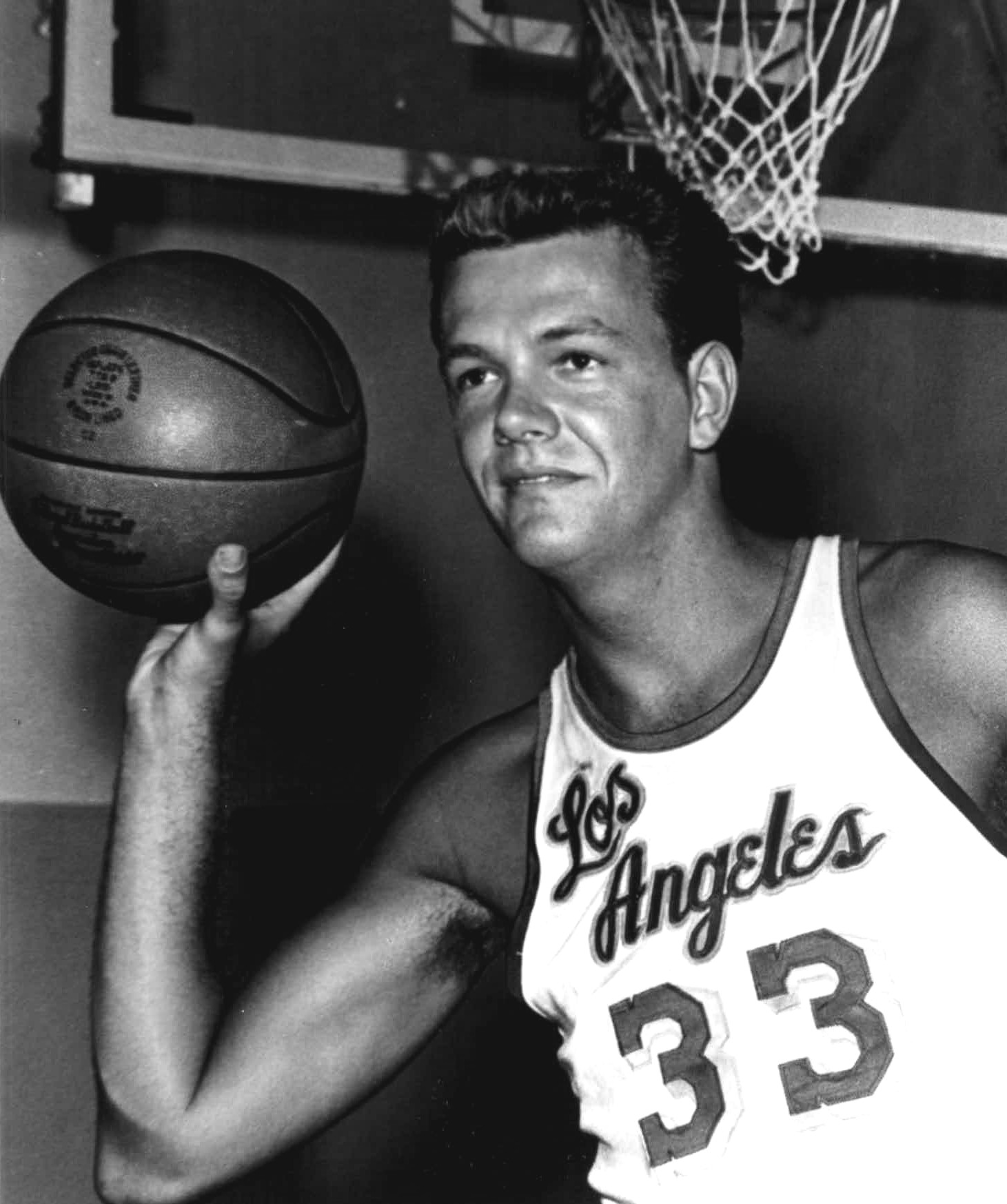
- Hundley, c. 1960–63

Personal information
- Born: October 26, 1934 Charleston, West Virginia, U.S.
- Died: March 27, 2015 (aged 80) Phoenix, Arizona, U.S.
- Listed height: 6 ft 4 in (1.93 m)
- Listed weight: 185 lb (84 kg)

Career information
- High school: Charleston (Charleston, West Virginia)
- College: West Virginia (1954–1957)
- NBA draft: 1957: 1st round, 1st overall pick
- Drafted by: Cincinnati Royals
- Playing career: 1957–1963
- Position: Point guard / shooting guard
- Number: 33

Career history
- 1957–1963: Minneapolis / Los Angeles Lakers

Career highlights
- 2× NBA All-Star (1960, 1961); Consensus first-team All-American (1957); Consensus second-team All-American (1956); SoCon Player of the Year (1957); No. 33 retired by West Virginia Mountaineers

Career NBA statistics
- Points: 3,625 (8.4 ppg)
- Rebounds: 1,420 (3.3 rpg)
- Assists: 1,455 (3.4 apg)
- Stats at NBA.com
- Stats at Basketball Reference

Rodney Clark "Hot Rod" Hundley (October 26, 1934 – March 27, 2015) was an American professional basketball player and television broadcaster. Hundley played college basketball for the West Virginia Mountaineers and was selected by the Cincinnati Royals with the first overall pick of the 1957 NBA draft. In 2003, Hundley received the Curt Gowdy Media Award from the Naismith Memorial Basketball Hall of Fame.

Hundley's life revolved around the game of basketball. His love and talent for the game led him to achieve honors in high school and most notably during his college years. At West Virginia University, Hundley played to packed crowds at the Old Field House. His dribbling antics and daredevil maneuvers on the floor led to his popular nickname, "Hot Rod". He later was a broadcaster for the Utah Jazz.

== Early life ==
Hundley was born on October 26, 1934, in Charleston, West Virginia. His parents divorced when he was young, after his father abandoned his teenage mother shortly after Hundley was born. He was sent to live with various relatives and friends in Charleston, and was placed in foster homes where he was abused and neglected. He was finally placed with a kindly older couple, living with them until he was 16; though his bedroom was a closet under the stairs in their small home. In high school, Hundley lived alone in a cheap hotel. He spent considerable time at YMCA basketball courts (where he began playing basketball at age 10), bars, and pool halls. In 2014, the YMCA of Kanawha Valley renamed its gymnasium in Hundley's honor.

Hundley showed evident talent for the game during his youth. At Charleston High School in West Virginia he averaged 30 points per game, and was named All-State three times, breaking the state's four-year scoring record in just three years, with 1,956 points (which has since been surpassed).

He received over 100 scholarship offers to colleges and universities.

== College career ==
Hundley played for West Virginia University (WVU) from 1953 to 1957, with one year of freshman basketball and three years of varsity basketball. As a freshman in 1953-1954, Hundley averaged nearly 35 points per game, and set a freshman scoring record with 62 points in a game against Ohio University. He scored over 40 points in 10 of the freshman team's 22 games, including 42 points in his very first game on December 2, 1953.

The Mountaineers made their first National Collegiate Athletic Association (NCAA) tournament appearance in 1955, Hundley's sophomore season, where they lost in the first round to eventual national champion La Salle. WVU also played in the NCAA tournaments in 1956 (losing to Dartmouth by two points in the first round) and 1957 (losing to Canisius in the first round). The Associated Press (AP) ranked the Mountaineers No. 19 in the nation in 1954-55, No. 20 in 1955-56, and as high as No. 4 in 1956-57, with a final ranking at No. 7.

=== Sophomore season ===
As a sophomore in 1955, Hundley averaged 23.7 points per game and 8.1 rebounds in 30 games, 27 of which he started. Hundley scored 24 points against Wake Forest, then followed up with 30 against Alabama. He then scored another 47 points against Wake Forest two games later. He then followed up with 24 points against Cornell then 38 points against NYU. Two games later, he scored 35 points and grabbed 10 rebounds against Carnegie Tech. Then he followed that up three games later with 30 points against VMI. He then had 17 points against Virginia Tech and 25 points with 11 rebounds against Pittsburgh in the Backyard Brawl. He then scored 35 points in a loss to Duke, had 21 against Penn State, 28 against Washington and Lee, 23 against William & Mary, and 35 points with 13 rebounds against Pitt. He followed the five-game stretch with 39 points and 10 rebounds against George Washington, then 25 points and 7 rebounds against Rutgers. He then had 27 points and 9 rebounds against VMI, 27 points and 12 rebounds against Washington & Lee, and then 30 points and 12 rebounds against George Washington.

In the Southern Conference tournament, Hundley had the opportunity to set the tournament scoring record with two free throws in the final seconds of a game against George Washington with the Mountaineers already having the game won. However, Hundley shot a hook shot and a behind-the-back shot that both resulted in air balls.

=== Junior season ===
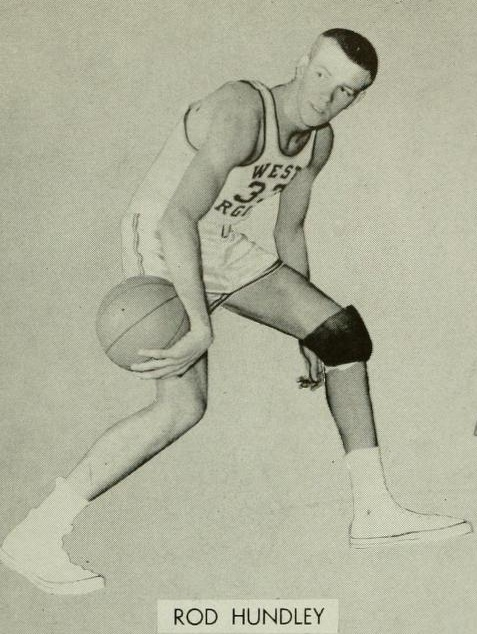
Hundley from The 1955 Monticola

As a junior in 1956, Hundley set a career-high with 26.6 points and 13.1 rebounds per game. He was a consensus second team All-American. Hundley's first six games of the season had scores of 34 points, 20 points, 27 points, 40 points, 20 points, and 21 points, respectively. He then had games of 23 points and 29 points against Columbia and Washington and Lee, respectively. He followed up with 17 points and 9 rebounds against Villanova, 25 points and 10 rebounds against La Salle, then a career-game of 24 points, 26 rebounds and 9 assists against VMI. He then had 28 points against Carnegie Tech and 29 points, 5 rebounds and 4 assists against Penn State. He followed it up with 29 points against Pittsburgh in the Backyard Brawl, 35 points and 6 rebounds against Furman, 28 points against VMI, and then 25 points and 24 rebounds against Richmond. He followed up with 25 points against Penn State and 28 points, 13 rebounds and 7 assists against Virginia Tech. He continued with 38 points against William & Mary, 40 points and 13 rebounds against St. John's, 31 points and 13 rebounds against William & Mary, and then 40 points and 7 rebounds against Pitt. He then had a season-high 42 points and 9 rebounds against Furman, then 26 points against Richmond.

=== Senior season ===
In his final collegiate season, in 1957, Hundley averaged 23.1 points and 10.5 rebounds per game. He was a consensus first team All-American. He began his senior season with 23 points and 9 rebounds in the first game, 25 points and 13 rebounds in the second game, and 28 points and 12 rebounds in the third game of the season. In the next contest against Penn State, Hundley scored 17 points and totaled 16 rebounds. He then had 25 points and 10 rebounds in the 83–82 upset over the Duke Blue Devils. He then had consecutive games of 24 points, the first with 9 rebounds and the second with 12. In the January 5 game against Furman, Hundley scored a career-high 54 points and grabbed 18 rebounds in the victory, a school record for points in a game. He followed the game up with a game of 32 points and then the following game with 34 points and 15 rebounds against Villanova. He then had three games of 21 points, 19 points and then 18 points. He then had a game of 30 points with 13 points against St. John's followed by a game of 34 points and 10 rebounds against VMI. He then had a five-game stretch of 32 points, 28 points, 23 points, 39 points, and 27 points and 20 rebounds.

=== Legacy ===
Hundley holds a varsity school record with 54 points in a single game against Furman and holds a freshman team record of 62 points. Over three varsity seasons, Hundley averaged 24.5 points per game, and totaled 2,180 career points, second only to Naismith Memorial Basketball Hall of Fame guard Jerry West's 2,309 points. He also averaged 10.6 rebounds per game over three years. During Hundley's varsity career, WVU had a won-loss record of 72–16 (.818), with three Southern Conference titles and three NCAA tournament appearances. He scored more than 40 points in a game six times, which led to the Mountaineers scoring over 100 points in nine games.

Hundley was the fourth player in NCAA history to score more than 2,000 points during his career—and he did it in three years, because freshman then could not play varsity basketball. Hundley was a second-team consensus All-American in 1955-56, and first-team consensus All-American in 1956-57. He was a two-time, first-team All-American and currently holds eight school records. As of 2025, he holds the school record for field goal attempts in a season and over a career; has three of the top ten scoring averages per season; is second all-time in points, field goals, and free throws attempted and made (behind Jerry West); and is third all-time in points per game.

He is one of only two Mountaineers to be drafted first overall in an NBA draft, with Mark Workman going first overall to the Milwaukee Hawks five years earlier in the 1952 NBA draft. Once on a trip back to West Virginia to play in a charity game at the WVU Coliseum, constructed more than 10 years after he left WVU, Rod was said to have told Basketball Hall of Famer and fellow WVU alumnus Jerry West: "I built this building." West retorted, "Yeah but I paid it off."

Hundley was also memorable in school history for his on-court antics. His in-game repertoire included trick shots, behind-the-back passes and spinning the ball on his finger. He was famous for dribbling the ball behind his back, spinning the ball on his finger, rolling it down his arm, and even going around his back. He also often took hook shots at the free throw line and also would hang off the rim waiting for a lob pass from a teammate. He was known to sit with fans in the stands and eat popcorn, instead of participating in time-out team huddles. He was nicknamed the "clown prince".

==== WVU honors ====
In 1992, Hundley was inducted into the WVU Sports Hall of Fame. In January 2010, WVU retired his number 33, making Hundley and West the only players in school history to be awarded the honor. On February 20, 2016, a bronze statue of him was unveiled outside the blue gate of the WVU Coliseum, joining the statue of West. In 2017, he was named an inaugural member of WVU's Mountaineer Legends Society.

== Professional career ==
In 1957, the Cincinnati Royals made Hundley the first pick of the NBA draft and immediately traded his rights to the Minneapolis Lakers. Hundley and Mark Workman, who also attended West Virginia, (1952 NBA draft) are the only No. 1 overall draft picks to come from the same high school.

Hundley played for the Lakers in Minneapolis and Los Angeles from 1957 until 1963, averaging 8.4 points per game and recording over 1,400 assists. He also played in two All Star games. His best season came in the 1959–60 season, when he averaged 12.8 points, 5.3 rebounds, and 4.6 assists per game. On February 1, 1960, Hundley recorded a triple-double, a feat even more notable in his era, with 17 points, 10 rebounds, and 10 assists.

On February 28, he scored a career high 33 points in a loss against the Philadelphia Warriors. That postseason, Hundley and the Lakers nearly made it back to the NBA Finals for the second year in a row, but lost in a tough seven-game series to Bob Pettit and the St. Louis Hawks in the Western Division Finals, where Hundley averaged 10.9 points, 6.6 rebounds, and 6.1 assists per game. The following year, during the 1960-61 NBA season, Hundley got teamed up with fellow Mountaineer legend Jerry West, as he was drafted in that year's draft.

In 1960, he was aboard the Minneapolis Lakers flight that crashed in an Iowa cornfield during a blizzard, with everyone surviving. After crashing, Hundley broke the silence by calling out "'I live to love again!'"

Hundley finished his six-year professional career at age 28 in 1963, due to his bad knees and poor training habits and lifestyle. His career totals were 3,625 points, 1,420 rebounds and 1,455 assists in his six seasons.

== Broadcasting career ==
After his retirement, Hundley moved to the broadcast booth, working four seasons for the Phoenix Suns, where he worked with Al McCoy; and four seasons for the Los Angeles Lakers. The Lakers' Chick Hearn was his announcing mentor. In the early 1970s, he also teamed with Dick Enberg to call syndicated college basketball for TVS. Hundley was an NBA announcer for five years for CBS, where he called four All-Star Games; he worked two All-Star Games on ABC Radio.

In 1974, Hundley became the first radio and television voice of the expansion New Orleans Jazz. Hundley continued as the voice of the Jazz until his retirement in 2009. He followed them to Salt Lake City in 1979, where he became as celebrated a broadcaster as he was a player. He was known for his rapid-fire style and sayings such as "from the parking lot" for a long-distance shot, or "with a gentle push and a mild arc and the old cowhide globe hits home" for a jump shot.

For many years, Hundley's broadcasts were simulcast on both television and radio, but the league forced the Jazz to end this practice starting with the 2005–2006 season, when Craig Bolerjack took over television duties. Hot Rod continued to provide the radio voice for the Jazz for four more seasons. As the decade wore on, nearly all NBA teams eventually moved radio broadcasters from court-side to perches high above the court, and the strain on Hundley's surgically replaced hips and knees became too much for him to bear. He announced his retirement on April 24, 2009, effective at the end of the season. In 2010, the Jazz named its media center for him.

After retirement, Hundley surfaced alongside Joel Meyers on KCAL's televised Lakers broadcasts as a fill-in color commentator for Stu Lantz.

In 2000, Hundley graduated from WVU with a bachelor's degree, 43 years after leaving his alma mater without a degree to play in the NBA. In 1982, he was on the NCAA Silver Anniversary All-America Team for distinguished service. In 1992, he was inducted into the WVU Sports Hall of Fame. He received the NBA's Distinguished Broadcaster award in 1994. In 2003, he received the Curt Gowdy Media Award from the Naismith Memorial Basketball Hall of Fame – the first former professional player to achieve such an honor. He was the master of ceremonies at three Naismith Memorial Hall of Fame induction ceremonies. In June 2004, he was voted into the Utah Broadcast Hall of Fame. He co-authored the book Hot Rod Hundley: You Gotta Love It Baby in 1998 with Tom McEachin; Bill Libby also wrote a biographical book about Hundley, Clown: No. 33 in Your Program, No. 1 in Your Heart, in 1970.

A newspaper once incorrectly reported Hundley wrote a book entitled The Man With a Lot to Smile About, and other sources have persisted in repeating the error.

== Film appearances ==
Hundley appeared in the 2006 movie Church Ball starring Fred Willard and Clint Howard. He had also been in talks for a movie that would have showcased his early childhood and basketball career.

Hundley is the subject of "Hot Rod The Documentary, the Untold Story of Hot Rod Hundley." The documentary was production of Pikewood Creative.

== Personal life and death ==
Hundley had three daughters with his wife, Flo Hundley, but he had not lived with her for over three decades at the time of her death in 2006 (though they remained married), and had not been involved with raising their children. In the documentary on Hundley's life, one of his adult daughters recognized that Hundley's own extremely difficult upbringing, and the absence of any guidance in his early life, were related to his later failings as a husband and father. One Utah columnist who wrote on Hundley over the years said Hundley had taken on his own father's bad qualities as a husband and father (though he did provide financial support to his wife and daughters that his own father never provided to him); and described Hundley's life from youth on as one filled with loneliness and sorrows, despite his flamboyant outer persona.

During the off-season, Hundley regularly conducted basketball clinics around the country and worked with charities in the Salt Lake City area until withdrawing from the public eye due to Alzheimer's disease in his final years. For a time, he also hosted the Hot Rod Hundley Celebrity Golf Tournament to benefit the Salt Lake Shriners Hospital.

Hundley died at the age of 80 in Phoenix, Arizona on March 27, 2015. After his death, the Jazz players wore a black stripe to honor him for the remainder of that season.

== Career statistics ==
Legend
GP	Games played	GS	Games started	MPG	Minutes per game
FG%	Field goal percentage	3P%	3-point field goal percentage	FT%	Free throw percentage
RPG	Rebounds per game	APG	Assists per game	SPG	Steals per game
BPG	Blocks per game	PPG	Points per game	**Bold**	Career high
*	Led the league

=== NBA ===
==== Regular season ====
Year	Team	GP	MPG	FG%	FT%	RPG	APG	PPG
1957–58	Minneapolis	65	17.8	.318	.642	2.9	1.9	7.0
1958–59	Minneapolis	71	23.4	**.360**	.752	3.5	2.9	9.6
1959–60	Minneapolis	73	**31.2**	.358	.744	**5.3**	**4.6**	**12.8**
1960–61	L.A. Lakers	**79***	27.6	.351	**.753**	3.7	4.4	11.0
1961–62	L.A. Lakers	78	19.1	.340	.654	2.6	3.7	5.5
1962–63	L.A. Lakers	65	12.1	.336	.706	1.6	2.3	4.0
Career		431	22.2	.347	.721	3.3	3.4	8.4
All-Star		2	18.5	.500	1.000	1.5	2.0	12.0

==== Playoffs ====
Year	Team	GP	MPG	FG%	FT%	RPG	APG	PPG
1959	Minneapolis	**13***	13.5	**.345**	.857	1.8	1.5	4.0
1960	Minneapolis	9	**37.4**	.336	.649	**6.8**	**6.1**	**11.8**
1961	L.A. Lakers	12*	23.9	.297	.690	3.4	3.8	6.7
1962	L.A. Lakers	12	15.6	.280	.750	1.5	2.7	1.9
1963	L.A. Lakers	7	4.9	.300	**1.000**	.9	.7	1.3
Career		53	19.2	.320	.716	2.8	3.0	5.1

== Honors ==
- In 1992, Hundley was inducted into the West Virginia University Sports Hall of Fame.
- Hundley received the NBA's Distinguished Broadcaster award in 1994.
- In 2003, Hundley received the Curt Gowdy Media Award from the Naismith Memorial Basketball Hall of Fame.
- In 2004, Hundley was inducted into the Utah Broadcast Hall of Fame.
- On January 23, 2010, Hundley's #33 Jersey was retired by West Virginia University. (After the halftime ceremony, Hundley took a basketball and made a hook shot to a standing ovation.)
- Hundley was inducted into the Southern Conference Hall of Fame in 2010.
- In 2016, a statue of Hundley was dedicated and placed outside the WVU Coliseum at West Virginia University.
