= 1961–62 Syracuse Nationals season =

Season for the Nationals in the National Basketball Association

- Head coach: Alex Hannum
- Arena: Onondaga War Memorial

Results
- Record: 41–39 (.513)
- Place: Division: 3rd (Eastern)
- Playoff finish: East Division Semifinals (lost to Warriors 2–3)
- Stats at Basketball Reference

Local media
- Television: WSYR-TV (National broadcasts NBC only)
- Radio: WFBL (Peter Scott)

The 1961–62 Syracuse Nationals season was the 13th season of the Nationals in the NBA.

== Roster ==
1961-62 Syracuse Nationals roster
Players

Pos.	No.	Player	Height	Weight	DOB	From
G	24	Al Bianchi	6 ft 3 in (1.91 m)	185 lb (84 kg)	1932-03-26	Bowling Green
G	21	Larry Costello	6 ft 1 in (1.85 m)	185 lb (84 kg)	1931-07-02	Niagara
F	20	Dave Gambee	6 ft 6 in (1.98 m)	215 lb (98 kg)	1937-04-16	Oregon State
F	23	Joe Graboski	6 ft 7 in (2.01 m)	195 lb (88 kg)	1930-01-15	Tuley (IL)
G/F	15	Hal Greer	6 ft 2 in (1.88 m)	175 lb (79 kg)	1936-06-26	Marshall
C	11	Swede Halbrook	7 ft 3 in (2.21 m)	230 lb (104 kg)	1933-01-30	Oregon State
F/C	10	Johnny Kerr	6 ft 9 in (2.06 m)	230 lb (104 kg)	1932-08-17	Illinois
G	5	Paul Neumann	6 ft 1 in (1.85 m)	175 lb (79 kg)	1938-01-30	Stanford
F	23	Chuck Osborne	6 ft 6 in (1.98 m)	210 lb (95 kg)	1939-01-21	Western Kentucky
F	12	Joe Roberts	6 ft 6 in (1.98 m)	214 lb (97 kg)	1936-05-18	Ohio State
F/C	4	Dolph Schayes	6 ft 7 in (2.01 m)	195 lb (88 kg)	1928-05-19	NYU
F	22	Lee Shaffer	6 ft 7 in (2.01 m)	215 lb (98 kg)	1939-02-23	North Carolina

Coaches
Head coach

Alex Hannum

Legend
- (DP) Unsigned draft pick
- (FA) Free agent
- (S) Suspended
- Injured

Roster

== Regular season ==
=== Season standings ===
Eastern Division	W	L	PCT	GB	Home	Road	Neutral	Div
x-Boston Celtics	60	20	.750	–	23–5	26–12	11–3	26–10
x-Philadelphia Warriors	49	31	.613	11	18–11	19–19	12–1	18–18
x-Syracuse Nationals	41	39	.513	19	18–10	11–19	12–10	17–19
New York Knicks	29	51	.363	31	19–15	2–23	8–13	11–25

x – clinched playoff spot

=== Game log ===
1961–62 Game log
#	Date	Opponent	Score	High points	Record
1	October 21	Chicago	103–123	Hal Greer (23)	1–0
2	October 26	N St. Louis	107–110	Dave Gambee (21)	1–1
3	October 27	@ Philadelphia	126–122	Dolph Schayes (28)	2–1
4	October 28	Philadelphia	119–115	Dolph Schayes (31)	2–2
5	October 29	@ Cincinnati	132–139	Dolph Schayes (27)	2–3
6	October 31	@ St. Louis	107–90	Hal Greer (30)	3–3
7	November 3	St. Louis	106–94	Lee Shaffer (16)	3–4
8	November 4	@ Boston	107–127	Johnny Kerr (21)	3–5
9	November 9	@ Philadelphia	108–151	Dave Gambee (20)	3–6
10	November 11	New York	109–135	Hal Greer (24)	4–6
11	November 14	N Cincinnati	115–119	Dolph Schayes (28)	4–7
12	November 15	N New York	114–102	Johnny Kerr (25)	5–7
13	November 18	Philadelphia	130–148	Hal Greer (36)	6–7
14	November 22	N New York	109–110	Hal Greer (30)	6–8
15	November 23	N Cincinnati	117–99	Hal Greer (21)	7–8
16	November 24	Cincinnati	127–125	Dolph Schayes (32)	7–9
17	November 25	@ St. Louis	108–141	Larry Costello (20)	7–10
18	November 28	N Los Angeles	121–111	Johnny Kerr (24)	8–10
19	November 29	@ Cincinnati	136–122	Dave Gambee (30)	9–10
20	December 1	@ New York	100–118	Dolph Schayes (23)	9–11
21	December 2	Chicago	118–132	Kerr, Shaffer (25)	10–11
22	December 4	@ Los Angeles	120–131	Lee Shaffer (32)	10–12
23	December 5	N Los Angeles	120–125	Larry Costello (22)	10–13
24	December 6	@ Los Angeles	121–123 (OT)	Dolph Schayes (28)	10–14
25	December 8	@ Boston	111–123	Larry Costello (32)	10–15
26	December 9	Boston	106–102	Dolph Schayes (24)	10–16
27	December 12	@ New York	126–124	Hal Greer (33)	11–16
28	December 13	Cincinnati	136–126	Lee Shaffer (28)	11–17
29	December 14	@ Philadelphia	125–136	Johnny Kerr (26)	11–18
30	December 16	N Los Angeles	128–123	Lee Shaffer (34)	12–18
31	December 19	N Detroit	124–111	Larry Costello (30)	13–18
32	December 25	Boston	127–122	Dave Gambee (28)	13–19
33	December 26	N Philadelphia	111–118	Hal Greer (25)	13–20
34	December 27	N Los Angeles	111–119	Lee Shaffer (23)	13–21
35	December 28	Los Angeles	121–114	Lee Shaffer (26)	13–22
36	December 30	Detroit	108–109	Lee Shaffer (22)	14–22
37	January 1	@ Cincinnati	110–106	Johnny Kerr (23)	15–22
38	January 2	@ Chicago	127–102	Hal Greer (31)	16–22
39	January 5	N Detroit	135–138 (OT)	Dave Gambee (34)	16–23
40	January 6	Chicago	102–120	Hal Greer (27)	17–23
41	January 7	@ New York	123–116	Greer, Shaffer (23)	18–23
42	January 9	@ Philadelphia	129–120	Johnny Kerr (31)	19–23
43	January 10	St. Louis	122–134	Hal Greer (36)	20–23
44	January 13	N Boston	127–117	Lee Shaffer (26)	21–23
45	January 14	New York	118–141	Hal Greer (40)	22–23
46	January 18	N Chicago	118–111	Hal Greer (35)	23–23
47	January 19	@ Boston	103–128	Hal Greer (23)	23–24
48	January 20	Boston	107–101	Johnny Kerr (27)	23–25
49	January 21	N Philadelphia	132–139 (OT)	Hal Greer (44)	23–26
50	January 23	@ St. Louis	107–115	Dave Gambee (21)	23–27
51	January 24	@ Detroit	102–111	Hal Greer (34)	23–28
52	January 25	N Detroit	100–101	Lee Shaffer (23)	23–29
53	January 27	@ Chicago	107–102	Hal Greer (22)	24–29
54	January 28	@ Cincinnati	131–139	Lee Shaffer (31)	24–30
55	January 31	New York	109–138	Hal Greer (30)	25–30
56	February 2	N St. Louis	135–101	Hal Greer (38)	26–30
57	February 3	Philadelphia	112–134	Johnny Kerr (32)	27–30
58	February 4	@ Philadelphia	117–128	Hal Greer (38)	27–31
59	February 6	N Chicago	127–123	Hal Greer (33)	28–31
60	February 8	Boston	110–122	Lee Shaffer (28)	29–31
61	February 9	@ New York	111–120	Al Bianchi (23)	29–32
62	February 11	Detroit	116–132	Hal Greer (23)	30–32
63	February 15	@ Chicago	121–126	Hal Greer (33)	30–33
64	February 16	N Chicago	132–106	Hal Greer (25)	31–33
65	February 17	N Chicago	136–127	Dolph Schayes (30)	32–33
66	February 18	New York	126–141	Gambee, Greer (33)	33–33
67	February 21	Philadelphia	109–150	Dave Gambee (31)	34–33
68	February 22	N Boston	106–134	Johnny Kerr (26)	34–34
69	February 23	@ Boston	107–121	Dave Gambee (28)	34–35
70	February 24	N New York	120–117	Dave Gambee (36)	35–35
71	February 25	Boston	110–106	Lee Shaffer (24)	35–36
72	February 27	@ New York	130–120	Lee Shaffer (34)	36–36
73	March 1	Cincinnati	108–137	Al Bianchi (29)	37–36
74	March 3	@ Detroit	128–114	Lee Shaffer (26)	38–36
75	March 4	Los Angeles	124–115	Lee Shaffer (32)	38–37
76	March 7	St. Louis	126–129	Dave Gambee (34)	39–37
77	March 10	Detroit	111–128	Lee Shaffer (31)	40–37
78	March 11	Philadelphia	130–148	Johnny Kerr (36)	41–37
79	March 13	@ Boston	110–142	Johnny Kerr (24)	41–38
80	March 14	@ Detroit	102–105	Larry Costello (21)	41–39

== Playoffs ==
1962 playoff game log
Division Semifinals: 2–3 (home: 1–1; road: 1–2)

Game	Date	Team	Score	High points	High rebounds	High assists	Location Attendance	Series
1	March 16	@ Philadelphia	L 103–110	Larry Costello (23)	Red Kerr (15)	Bianchi, Shaffer (4)	Philadelphia Civic Center; 6,937	0–1
2	March 18	Philadelphia	L 82–97	Red Kerr (18)	Lee Shaffer (13)	Larry Costello (5)	Onondaga War Memorial; 5,250	0–2
3	March 19	@ Philadelphia	W 101–100	Lee Shaffer (30)	Red Kerr (16)	Larry Costello (10)	Philadelphia Civic Center; 5,328	1–2
4	March 20	Philadelphia	W 106–99	Red Kerr (27)	Red Kerr (22)	Larry Costello (7)	Onondaga War Memorial	2–2
5	March 22	@ Philadelphia	L 104–121	Lee Shaffer (30)	Red Kerr (15)	Al Bianchi (5)	Philadelphia Civic Center; 7,829	2–3

1962 schedule
