= 1961–62 Los Angeles Lakers season =

Season of NBA team the Los Angeles Lakers

- Division champions
- Head coach: Fred Schaus
- Arena: Los Angeles Memorial Sports Arena

Results
- Record: 54–26 (.675)
- Place: Division: 1st (Western)
- Playoff finish: NBA Finals (lost to Celtics 3–4)
- Stats at Basketball Reference

Local media
- Television: KHJ-TV; Chick Hearn & Bill Brundige
- Radio: KHJ; Hearn and Brundige

The 1961–62 Los Angeles Lakers season was the Lakers' 14th season in the NBA and second season in Los Angeles. For the first time since 1959, the Lakers advanced to the NBA Finals, and it was the first NBA Finals appearance for the team in the city of Los Angeles. For the second time, they met the Boston Celtics, who they would meet five further times in the 1960s. However, the Lakers lost in seven games; Frank Selvy missed a potential winning shot in Game 7 after the Lakers had lost Game 6 in Los Angeles, and the Celtics pulled away in overtime to win their fourth straight title.

== Roster ==
1961–62 Los Angeles Lakers roster
Players

Pos.	No.	Player	Height	Weight	DOB	From
SF	22	Elgin Baylor	6 ft 5 in (1.96 m)	225 lb (102 kg)	1934-09-16	Seattle
C	14	Ray Felix	6 ft 11 in (2.11 m)	220 lb (100 kg)	1930-12-10	Long Island
SF	20	Tom Hawkins	6 ft 5 in (1.96 m)	210 lb (95 kg)	1936-12-22	Notre Dame
SG	33	Hot Rod Hundley	6 ft 4 in (1.93 m)	185 lb (84 kg)	1934-10-26	West Virginia
PF	54	Howie Jolliff	6 ft 7 in (2.01 m)	218 lb (99 kg)	1938-07-20	Ohio
C	32	Jim Krebs	6 ft 8 in (2.03 m)	230 lb (104 kg)	1935-09-08	SMU
PF	35	Rudy LaRusso	6 ft 7 in (2.01 m)	220 lb (100 kg)	1937-11-11	Dartmouth
PG	52	Bob McNeill	6 ft 1 in (1.85 m)	170 lb (77 kg)	1938-10-22	Saint Joseph's
SG	11	Frank Selvy	6 ft 3 in (1.91 m)	180 lb (82 kg)	1932-11-09	Furman
PG	44	Jerry West	6 ft 3 in (1.91 m)	175 lb (79 kg)	1938-05-28	West Virginia
C	55	Wayne Yates	6 ft 8 in (2.03 m)	235 lb (107 kg)	1937-11-07	Memphis

Coaches
Head coach
- Fred Schaus

Legend
- (DP) Unsigned draft pick
- (FA) Free agent
- (S) Suspended
- Injured

Roster
Updated: December, 1961

== Regular season ==
=== Season standings ===
Western Division	W	L	PCT	GB	Home	Road	Neutral	Div
x-Los Angeles Lakers	54	26	.675	–	26–5	18–13	10–8	33–13
x-Cincinnati Royals	43	37	.538	11	18–13	14–16	11–8	29–17
x-Detroit Pistons	37	43	.463	17	16–14	8–17	13–12	24–22
St. Louis Hawks	29	51	.363	25	19–16	7–27	3–8	16–30
Chicago Packers	18	62	.225	36	15-23	3-39	0–0	10–30

x – clinched playoff spot

=== Game log ===
1961–62 game log
#	Date	Opponent	Score	High points	Record
1	October 19	N Philadelphia	113–118	Elgin Baylor (35)	1–0
2	October 20	@ Philadelphia	115–122	Jerry West (36)	1–1
3	October 24	N Cincinnati	124–122	Elgin Baylor (31)	2–1
4	October 25	@ Detroit	120–116	Elgin Baylor (36)	3–1
5	October 27	Detroit	118–128	Elgin Baylor (27)	4–1
6	October 28	Detroit	126–135	Jerry West (40)	5–1
7	November 1	Cincinnati	115–120	Elgin Baylor (41)	6–1
8	November 3	Cincinnati	132–114	Elgin Baylor (30)	6–2
9	November 4	@ Chicago	125–112	Jerry West (42)	7–2
10	November 7	@ St. Louis	127–110	Elgin Baylor (37)	8–2
11	November 8	St. Louis	118–124	Jerry West (42)	9–2
12	November 13	Chicago	113–127	Elgin Baylor (39)	10–2
13	November 15	Chicago	118–133	Elgin Baylor (36)	11–2
14	November 17	@ Philadelphia	125–121	Elgin Baylor (37)	12–2
15	November 18	@ Boston	103–101	Elgin Baylor (32)	13–2
16	November 21	N Detroit	102–108	Elgin Baylor (26)	13–3
17	November 23	@ St. Louis	122–114	Elgin Baylor (40)	14–3
18	November 24	@ New York	100–89	Elgin Baylor (34)	15–3
19	November 25	@ Detroit	103–104	Elgin Baylor (31)	15–4
20	November 26	@ Cincinnati	102–117	Elgin Baylor (37)	15–5
21	November 28	N Syracuse	121–111	Elgin Baylor (49)	15–6
22	December 1	Philadelphia	138–117	Jerry West (36)	15–7
23	December 2	Philadelphia	119–129	Jerry West (32)	16–7
24	December 4	Syracuse	120–131	Elgin Baylor (50)	17–7
25	December 5	Syracuse	120–125	Elgin Baylor (45)	18–7
26	December 6	Syracuse	121–123 (OT)	Elgin Baylor (47)	19–7
27	December 8	@ Philadelphia	151–147 (3OT)	Elgin Baylor (63)	20–7
28	December 9	@ Detroit	114–107	Elgin Baylor (38)	21–7
29	December 11	St. Louis	119–132	Elgin Baylor (52)	22–7
30	December 13	St. Louis	136–137 (OT)	Elgin Baylor (52)	23–7
31	December 15	@ Chicago	94–97	Elgin Baylor (28)	23–8
32	December 16	N Syracuse	128–123	Elgin Baylor (42)	23–9
33	December 17	N Detroit	122–116	Jerry West (47)	24–9
34	December 19	Boston	101–104	Jerry West (29)	25–9
35	December 20	N Chicago	102–98	Elgin Baylor (35)	26–9
36	December 23	@ St. Louis	129–126	Elgin Baylor (47)	27–9
37	December 25	@ Cincinnati	141–127	Elgin Baylor (40)	28–9
38	December 26	@ Boston	117–129	Elgin Baylor (30)	28–10
39	December 27	N Syracuse	111–119	Elgin Baylor (48)	29–10
40	December 28	@ Syracuse	121–114	Elgin Baylor (44)	30–10
41	December 29	N Philadelphia	123–118	Elgin Baylor (52)	30–11
42	January 1	Philadelphia	111–114	Jerry West (36)	31–11
43	January 3	Philadelphia	123–124	Jerry West (44)	32–11
44	January 7	Boston	118–95	Jerry West (31)	32–12
45	January 13	@ St. Louis	108–107	Jerry West (43)	33–12
46	January 14	N Detroit	108–118	Jerry West (31)	33–13
47	January 17	New York	121–129	Jerry West (63)	34–13
48	January 19	New York	107–108	Jerry West (32)	35–13
49	January 20	@ Cincinnati	124–125	Jerry West (36)	35–14
50	January 21	@ Chicago	112–111 (OT)	Jerry West (36)	36–14
51	January 23	N Boston	103–118	Jerry West (32)	36–15
52	January 24	Cincinnati	123–136	Jerry West (50)	37–15
53	January 25	Cincinnati	112–116	Elgin Baylor (39)	38–15
54	January 28	Chicago	109–124	Elgin Baylor (36)	39–15
55	January 30	Chicago	92–107	Jerry West (36)	40–15
56	January 31	@ Detroit	123–122 (OT)	Jerry West (39)	41–15
57	February 1	N Boston	115–130	Selvy, West (22)	41–16
58	February 3	@ St. Louis	127–124	Jerry West (45)	42–16
59	February 4	@ Chicago	105–113	Rudy LaRusso (30)	42–17
60	February 5	N Cincinnati	134–128 (OT)	Jerry West (46)	43–17
61	February 6	@ New York	112–116	Jerry West (36)	43–18
62	February 8	N Cincinnati	109–113	Rudy LaRusso (23)	43–19
63	February 12	St. Louis	117–113	Rudy LaRusso (28)	43–20
64	February 14	St. Louis	107–130	Jerry West (30)	44–20
65	February 16	@ Detroit	121–127	Jerry West (40)	44–21
66	February 17	@ New York	128–121	Rudy LaRusso (31)	45–21
67	February 18	Boston	99–125	Elgin Baylor (38)	46–21
68	February 20	Boston	115–96	Krebs, West (19)	46–22
69	February 22	N New York	116–118	Jerry West (36)	47–22
70	February 23	N Chicago	124–117 (OT)	Jerry West (39)	48–22
71	February 24	@ Cincinnati	114–118	Jerry West (34)	48–23
72	February 25	Detroit	99–128	Elgin Baylor (45)	49–23
73	February 27	Detroit	100–107	Jerry West (34)	50–23
74	March 3	@ St. Louis	125–134	Rudy LaRusso (42)	50–24
75	March 4	@ Syracuse	124–115	Jerry West (35)	51–24
76	March 9	@ New York	100–122	Jerry West (28)	51–25
77	March 11	@ Boston	105–119	Jerry West (31)	51–26
78	March 12	N New York	106–119	Elgin Baylor (37)	52–26
79	March 13	Cincinnati	111–120	Jerry West (37)	53–26
80	March 14	St. Louis	115–125	Rudy LaRusso (50)	54–26

== Playoffs ==
1962 playoff game log
Division finals: 4–2 (home: 2–1; road: 2–1)

Game	Date	Team	Score	High points	High rebounds	Location	Series
1	March 24	Detroit	W 132–108	Elgin Baylor (35)	Elgin Baylor (17)	Los Angeles Memorial Sports Arena	1–0
2	March 25	Detroit	W 127–112	Jerry West (40)	West, Baylor (13)	Los Angeles Memorial Sports Arena	2–0
3	March 27	@ Detroit	W 111–106	Elgin Baylor (34)	Elgin Baylor (17)	Cobo Arena	3–0
4	March 29	@ Detroit	L 117–118	Elgin Baylor (45)	Elgin Baylor (17)	Cobo Arena	3–1
5	March 31	Detroit	L 125–132	Elgin Baylor (37)	Elgin Baylor (19)	Los Angeles Memorial Sports Arena	3–2
6	April 3	@ Detroit	W 123–117	West, Baylor (38)	—	Cobo Arena	4–2

NBA Finals: 3–4 (home: 1–2; road: 2–2)

Game	Date	Team	Score	High points	High rebounds	High assists	Location Attendance	Series
1	April 7	@ Boston	L 108–122	Elgin Baylor (35)	Elgin Baylor (17)	Jerry West (4)	Boston Garden; 7,467	0–1
2	April 8	@ Boston	W 129–122	Jerry West (40)	Jim Krebs (13)	Frank Selvy (6)	Boston Garden; 12,364	1–1
3	April 10	Boston	W 117–115	Elgin Baylor (39)	Elgin Baylor (23)	Frank Selvy (5)	Los Angeles Memorial Sports Arena; 15,180	2–1
4	April 11	Boston	L 103–115	Elgin Baylor (38)	Elgin Baylor (14)	Elgin Baylor (6)	Los Angeles Memorial Sports Arena; 15,104	2–2
5	April 14	@ Boston	W 126–121	Elgin Baylor (61)	Elgin Baylor (22)	Frank Selvy (5)	Boston Garden; 13,909	3–2
6	April 16	Boston	L 105–119	West, Baylor (34)	Elgin Baylor (15)	West, LaRusso (5)	Los Angeles Memorial Sports Arena; 14,030	3–3
7	April 18	@ Boston	L 107–110 (OT)	Elgin Baylor (41)	Elgin Baylor (22)	three players tied (4)	Boston Garden; 13,909	3–4

1962 schedule

== Awards and records ==
- Elgin Baylor, All-NBA First Team
- Jerry West, All-NBA First Team
- Elgin Baylor, NBA All-Star Game
- Jerry West, NBA All-Star Game
- Frank Selvy, NBA All-Star Game
- Rudy LaRusso, NBA All-Star Game
