= 1962 NBA playoffs =

Sports tournament

Tournament details
- Dates: March 16–April 18, 1962
- Season: 1961–62
- Teams: 6

Final positions
- Champions: Boston Celtics (5th title)
- Runners-up: Los Angeles Lakers
- Semifinalists: Detroit Pistons; Philadelphia Warriors

Tournament statistics
- Scoring leader(s): Elgin Baylor (Lakers) (38.6 PPG)

The 1962 NBA playoffs was the postseason tournament of the National Basketball Association's 1961-62 season. The tournament concluded with the Eastern Division champion Boston Celtics defeating the Western Division champion Los Angeles Lakers 4 games to 3 in the NBA Finals.

The Celtics won their 4th straight title to become the first (and as of 2026, only) NBA team to do so. Boston's Game 7 victory occurred in OT, with Bill Russell tying his own Finals record with 40 rebounds.

This was the second NBA Finals played between the Celtics and Lakers, but it was the first one the Lakers played in since they moved to Los Angeles.

Though the NBA has existed since 1947, this is the earliest NBA Finals played between two teams that still reside in their present (2022) locations.

== Bracket ==
Division Semifinals
E3	Syracuse	2
E2	Philadelphia	3
W3	Detroit	3
W2	Cincinnati	1

Division Finals
Eastern Division
E1	Boston*	4
E2	Philadelphia	3
Western Division
W1	Los Angeles*	4
W3	Detroit	2

NBA Finals
E1	Boston*	4
W1	Los Angeles*	3

- * Division winner
- Bold Series winner
- Italic Team with home-court advantage in NBA Finals

== Division Semifinals ==
=== Eastern Division Semifinals ===
==== (2) Philadelphia Warriors vs. (3) Syracuse Nationals ====
March 16

Boxscore

Syracuse Nationals 103, Philadelphia Warriors 110
Scoring by quarter: 21–26, 22–29, 28–35, 32–20
Pts: Larry Costello 23; Rebs: Red Kerr 15; Asts: Bianchi, Shaffer 4 each	Pts: Paul Arizin 43; Rebs: Wilt Chamberlain 25; Asts: Guy Rodgers 8
Philadelphia leads series, 1–0

Philadelphia Civic Center, Philadelphia, Pennsylvania
Attendance: 6,937

March 18

Boxscore

Philadelphia Warriors 97, Syracuse Nationals 82
Scoring by quarter: 26–27, 28–16, 22–18, 21–21
Pts: Wilt Chamberlain 28; Rebs: Wilt Chamberlain 26; Asts: Wilt Chamberlain 4	Pts: Red Kerr 18; Rebs: Lee Shaffer 13; Asts: Larry Costello 5
Philadelphia leads series, 2–0

Onondaga War Memorial, Syracuse, New York
Attendance: 5,250

March 19

Boxscore

Syracuse Nationals 101, Philadelphia Warriors 100
Scoring by quarter: 27–27, 34–35, 19–24, 21–14
Pts: Lee Shaffer 30; Rebs: Red Kerr 16; Asts: Larry Costello 10	Pts: Wilt Chamberlain 40; Rebs: Wilt Chamberlain 25; Asts: Guy Rodgers 9
Philadelphia leads series, 2–1

Philadelphia Civic Center, Philadelphia, Pennsylvania
Attendance: 5,328

March 20

Boxscore

Philadelphia Warriors 99, Syracuse Nationals 106
Scoring by quarter: 24–30, 24–28, 24–25, 27–23
Pts: Wilt Chamberlain 29; Rebs: Wilt Chamberlain 20; Asts: Guy Rodgers 7	Pts: Red Kerr 27; Rebs: Red Kerr 22; Asts: Larry Costello 7
Series tied, 2–2

Onondaga War Memorial, Syracuse, New York

March 22

Boxscore

Syracuse Nationals 104, Philadelphia Warriors 121
Scoring by quarter: 28–35, 29–24, 20–31, 27–31
Pts: Lee Shaffer 30; Rebs: Red Kerr 15; Asts: Al Bianchi 5	Pts: Wilt Chamberlain 56; Rebs: Wilt Chamberlain 35; Asts: Guy Rodgers 10
Philadelphia wins series, 3–2

Philadelphia Civic Center, Philadelphia, Pennsylvania
Attendance: 7,829

This was the ninth playoff meeting between these two teams, with the 76ers/Nationals winning five of the first eight meetings.

Previous playoff series
Philadelphia 76ers/ Syracuse Nationals leads 5–3 in all-time playoff series

1950

Philadelphia Warriors 0, Syracuse Nationals 2

1950 Eastern Division Semifinals

1951

Philadelphia Warriors 0, Syracuse Nationals 2

1951 Eastern Division Semifinals

1952

Philadelphia Warriors 1, Syracuse Nationals 2

1952 Eastern Division Semifinals

1956

Philadelphia Warriors 3, Syracuse Nationals 2

1956 Eastern Division Finals

1957

Philadelphia Warriors 0, Syracuse Nationals 2

1957 Eastern Division Semifinals

1958

Philadelphia Warriors 2, Syracuse Nationals 1

1958 Eastern Division Semifinals

1960

Philadelphia Warriors 2, Syracuse Nationals 1

1960 Eastern Division Semifinals

1961

Philadelphia Warriors 0, Syracuse Nationals 3

1961 Eastern Division Semifinals

=== Western Division Semifinals ===
==== (2) Cincinnati Royals vs. (3) Detroit Pistons ====
March 16

Boxscore

Cincinnati Royals 122, Detroit Pistons 123
Scoring by quarter: 29–32, 29–27, 31–34, 33–30
Pts: Bockhorn, Robertson 24 each	Pts: Ray Scott 34
Detroit leads series, 1–0

Cobo Arena, Detroit, Michigan
Attendance: 4,121

March 17

Boxscore

Detroit Pistons 107, Cincinnati Royals 129
Scoring by quarter: 25–31, 24–31, 29–30, 29–37
Pts: Ohl, Shue 18 each	Pts: Oscar Robertson 33
Series tied, 1–1

Cincinnati Gardens, Cincinnati, Ohio
Attendance: 1,829

March 18

Boxscore

Cincinnati Royals 107, Detroit Pistons 118
Scoring by quarter: 25–19, 24–29, 32–39, 26–31
Pts: Oscar Robertson 26	Pts: Bailey Howell 27
Detroit leads series, 2–1

Cobo Arena, Detroit, Michigan
Attendance: 3,147

March 20

Boxscore

Detroit Pistons 112, Cincinnati Royals 111
Scoring by quarter: 27–21, 36–34, 22–24, 27–32
Pts: Don Ohl 33	Pts: Oscar Robertson 32
Detroit wins series, 3–1

Cincinnati Gardens, Cincinnati, Ohio
Attendance: 3,336

This was the seventh playoff meeting between these two teams, with both teams splitting the first six meetings. (It would also be Detroit's last playoff series victory for fourteen years.)

Previous playoff series
Tied 3–3 in all-time playoff series

1950

Fort Wayne Pistons 2, Rochester Royals 0

1950 Central Division Semifinals

1951

Fort Wayne Pistons 1, Rochester Royals 2

1951 Western Division Semifinals

1952

Fort Wayne Pistons 0, Rochester Royals 2

1952 Western Division Semifinals

1953

Fort Wayne Pistons 2, Rochester Royals 0

1953 Western Division Semifinals

1954

Fort Wayne Pistons 0, Rochester Royals 2

1954 Western Division Round Robin Semifinals

1958

Fort Wayne Pistons 2, Cincinnati Royals 0

1958 Western Division Semifinals

== Division Finals ==
=== Eastern Division Finals ===
==== (1) Boston Celtics vs. (2) Philadelphia Warriors ====
March 24

Boxscore

Philadelphia Warriors 89, Boston Celtics 117
Scoring by quarter: 15–24, 20–26, 29–36, 25–31
Pts: Wilt Chamberlain 33; Rebs: Wilt Chamberlain 31; Asts: Chamberlain, Arizin 3 each	Pts: Sam Jones 20; Rebs: Bill Russell 30; Asts: Bob Cousy 8
Boston leads series, 1–0

Boston Garden, Boston, Massachusetts
Attendance: 10,274

March 27

Boxscore

Boston Celtics 106, Philadelphia Warriors 113
Scoring by quarter: 26–27, 34–22, 25–30, 21–34
Pts: Tom Heinsohn 24; Rebs: Bill Russell 20; Asts: Bill Russell 6	Pts: Wilt Chamberlain 42; Rebs: Wilt Chamberlain 37; Asts: Guy Rodgers 10
Series tied, 1–1

Philadelphia Civic Center, Philadelphia, Pennsylvania

March 28

Boxscore

Philadelphia Warriors 114, Boston Celtics 129
Scoring by quarter: 29–35, 26–41, 26–33, 33–20
Pts: Wilt Chamberlain 35; Rebs: Wilt Chamberlain 29; Asts: Wilt Chamberlain 6	Pts: Russell, Heinsohn 31 each Rebs: Bill Russell 31; Asts: Bob Cousy 10
Boston leads series, 2–1

Boston Garden, Boston, Massachusetts

March 31

Boxscore

Boston Celtics 106, Philadelphia Warriors 110
Scoring by quarter: 25–23, 29–32, 23–23, 29–32
Pts: Bill Russell 31; Rebs: Bill Russell 30; Asts: Bob Cousy 10	Pts: Wilt Chamberlain 41; Rebs: Wilt Chamberlain 34; Asts: Guy Rodgers 10
Series tied, 2–2

Philadelphia Civic Center, Philadelphia, Pennsylvania

April 1

Boxscore

Philadelphia Warriors 104, Boston Celtics 119
Scoring by quarter: 26–36, 23–36, 19–18, 36–29
Pts: Wilt Chamberlain 30; Rebs: Wilt Chamberlain 14; Asts: Guy Rodgers 9	Pts: Bill Russell 29; Rebs: Bill Russell 26; Asts: Russell, S. Jones 7 each
Boston leads series, 3–2

Boston Garden, Boston, Massachusetts

April 3

Boxscore

Boston Celtics 99, Philadelphia Warriors 109
Scoring by quarter: 22–34, 30–28, 26–25, 21–22
Pts: Heinsohn, Cousy 22 each Rebs: Bill Russell 22; Asts: Bob Cousy 12	Pts: Wilt Chamberlain 32; Rebs: Wilt Chamberlain 21; Asts: Guy Rodgers 10
Series tied, 3–3

Philadelphia Civic Center, Philadelphia, Pennsylvania

April 5

Boxscore

Philadelphia Warriors 107, Boston Celtics 109
Scoring by quarter: 23–34, 33–18, 25–28, 26–29
Pts: Tom Meschery 32; Rebs: Wilt Chamberlain 22; Asts: Guy Rodgers 8	Pts: Sam Jones 28; Rebs: Bill Russell 22; Asts: K. C. Jones 10
Boston wins series, 4–3

Boston Garden, Boston, Massachusetts

- Paul Arizin's final NBA game; Sam Jones hits the series-winning shot with 2 seconds left.

This was the third playoff meeting between these two teams, with the Celtics winning the first two meetings.

Previous playoff series
Boston leads 2–0 in all-time playoff series

1958

Boston Celtics 4, Philadelphia Warriors 1

1958 Eastern Division Finals

1960

Boston Celtics 4, Philadelphia Warriors 2

1960 Eastern Division Finals

=== Western Division Finals ===
==== (1) Los Angeles Lakers vs. (3) Detroit Pistons ====
March 24

Boxscore

Detroit Pistons 108, Los Angeles Lakers 132
Scoring by quarter: 27–28, 31–39, 30–32, 20–33
Pts: Bailey Howell 27; Rebs: Walter Dukes 12	Pts: Elgin Baylor 35; Rebs: Elgin Baylor 17
Los Angeles leads series, 1–0

Los Angeles Memorial Sports Arena, Los Angeles, California

March 25

Boxscore

Detroit Pistons 112, Los Angeles Lakers 127
Scoring by quarter: 24–29, 24–32, 35–38, 29–28
Pts: Don Ohl 33; Rebs: Bailey Howell 13	Pts: Jerry West 40; Rebs: West, Baylor 13 each
Los Angeles leads series, 2–0

Los Angeles Memorial Sports Arena, Los Angeles, California

March 27

Boxscore

Los Angeles Lakers 111, Detroit Pistons 106
Scoring by quarter: 35–24, 26–29, 26–27, 24–26
Pts: Elgin Baylor 34; Rebs: Elgin Baylor 17	Pts: Gene Shue 26; Rebs: Walter Dukes 25
Los Angeles leads series, 3–0

Cobo Arena, Detroit, Michigan

March 29

Boxscore

Los Angeles Lakers 117, Detroit Pistons 118
Scoring by quarter: 23–29, 36–35, 27–27, 31–27
Pts: Elgin Baylor 45; Rebs: Elgin Baylor 17	Pts: Bailey Howell 24; Rebs: Ray Scott 23
Los Angeles leads series, 3–1

Cobo Arena, Detroit, Michigan

March 31

Boxscore

Detroit Pistons 132, Los Angeles Lakers 125
Scoring by quarter: 30–19, 38–33, 34–22, 30–51
Pts: Willie Jones 27; Rebs: Ray Scott 13	Pts: Elgin Baylor 37; Rebs: Elgin Baylor 19
Los Angeles leads series, 3–2

Los Angeles Memorial Sports Arena, Los Angeles, California

April 3

Boxscore

Los Angeles Lakers 123, Detroit Pistons 117
Scoring by quarter: 31–27, 33–18, 33–39, 26–33
Pts: Baylor, West 38 each	Pts: Ray Scott 22
Los Angeles wins series, 4–2

Cobo Arena, Detroit, Michigan

This was the ninth playoff meeting between these two teams, with the Lakers winning seven of the first eight meetings.

Previous playoff series
Los Angeles leads 7–1 in all-time playoff series

1950

Fort Wayne Pistons 0, Minneapolis Lakers 2

1950 Central Division Finals

1953

Fort Wayne Pistons 2, Minneapolis Lakers 3

1953 Western Division Finals

1954

Fort Wayne Pistons 0, Minneapolis Lakers 2

1954 Western Division Round Robin Semifinals

1955

Fort Wayne Pistons 3, Minneapolis Lakers 1

1955 Western Division Finals

1957

Fort Wayne Pistons 0, Minneapolis Lakers 2

1957 Western Division Semifinals

1959

Detroit Pistons 1, Minneapolis Lakers 2

1959 Western Division Semifinals

1960

Detroit Pistons 0, Minneapolis Lakers 2

1960 Western Division Semifinals

1961

Detroit Pistons 2, Los Angeles Lakers 3

1961 Western Division Semifinals

== NBA Finals: (E1) Boston Celtics vs. (W1) Los Angeles Lakers ==
April 7

Boxscore

Los Angeles Lakers 108, Boston Celtics 122
Scoring by quarter: 32–29, 20–31, 22–35, 34–27
Pts: Elgin Baylor 35; Rebs: Elgin Baylor 17; Asts: Jerry West 4	Pts: Sam Jones 24; Rebs: Bill Russell 28; Asts: Bob Cousy 7
Boston leads series, 1–0

Boston Garden, Boston, Massachusetts
Attendance: 7,467

April 8

Boxscore

Los Angeles Lakers 129, Boston Celtics 122
Scoring by quarter: 30–36, 43–23, 29–39, 27–24
Pts: Jerry West 40; Rebs: Jim Krebs 13; Asts: Frank Selvy 6	Pts: Tom Heinsohn 27; Rebs: Bill Russell 23; Asts: Bob Cousy 11
Series tied, 1–1

Boston Garden, Boston, Massachusetts
Attendance: 12,364

April 10

Boxscore

Boston Celtics 115, Los Angeles Lakers 117
Scoring by quarter: 27–24, 23–30, 28–33, 37–30
Pts: Bill Russell 26; Rebs: Bill Russell 32; Asts: Bob Cousy 8	Pts: Elgin Baylor 39; Rebs: Elgin Baylor 23; Asts: Frank Selvy 5
Los Angeles leads series, 2–1

Los Angeles Memorial Sports Arena, Los Angeles, California
Attendance: 15,180

- Jerry West steals Sam Jones' inbound pass and hit the game winning buzzer-beater.

April 11

Boxscore

Boston Celtics 115, Los Angeles Lakers 103
Scoring by quarter: 32–20, 28–31, 31–25, 24–27
Pts: Bill Russell 21; Rebs: Bill Russell 22; Asts: Bob Cousy 13	Pts: Elgin Baylor 38; Rebs: Elgin Baylor 14; Asts: Elgin Baylor 6
Series tied, 2–2

Los Angeles Memorial Sports Arena, Los Angeles, California
Attendance: 15,104

April 14

Boxscore

Los Angeles Lakers 126, Boston Celtics 121
Scoring by quarter: 31–30, 35–38, 27–31, 33–22
Pts: Elgin Baylor 61; Rebs: Elgin Baylor 22; Asts: Frank Selvy 5	Pts: Tom Heinsohn 30; Rebs: Bill Russell 29; Asts: Bob Cousy 10
Los Angeles leads series, 3–2

Boston Garden, Boston, Massachusetts
Attendance: 13,909

- Elgin Baylor's 61 points sets a Finals record for an individual scorer in a game.

April 16

Boxscore

Boston Celtics 119, Los Angeles Lakers 105
Scoring by quarter: 33–34, 24–31, 34–16, 28–24
Pts: Sam Jones 35; Rebs: Bill Russell 24; Asts: Bill Russell 10	Pts: West, Baylor 34 each Rebs: Elgin Baylor 15; Asts: West, LaRusso 5 each
Series tied, 3–3

Los Angeles Memorial Sports Arena, Los Angeles, California
Attendance: 14,030

April 18

Boxscore

Los Angeles Lakers 107, Boston Celtics 110 (OT)
Scoring by quarter: 22–22, 25–31, 28–22, 25–25, Overtime: 7–10
Pts: Elgin Baylor 41; Rebs: Elgin Baylor 22; Asts: three players 4 each	Pts: Bill Russell 30; Rebs: Bill Russell 40; Asts: Bob Cousy 9
Boston wins series, 4–3

Boston Garden, Boston, Massachusetts
Attendance: 13,909

- Frank Selvy misses the championship-winning shot in regulation; Bill Russell's 40 rebounds ties his own Finals record in a single game.

This was the second playoff meeting between these two teams, with the Celtics winning first meeting when the Lakers were in Minneapolis.

Previous playoff series
Boston leads 1–0 in all-time playoff series

1959

Boston Celtics 4, Minneapolis Lakers 0

1959 NBA Finals
