= 1961–62 New York Knicks season =

Season of National Basketball Association team the New York Knicks

- Head coach: Eddie Donovan
- General manager: Fred Podesta
- Arena: Madison Square Garden

Results
- Record: 29–51 (.363)
- Place: Division: 4th (Eastern)
- Playoff finish: Did not qualify
- Stats at Basketball Reference

Local media
- Television: WPIX
- Radio: WINS

The 1961–62 New York Knicks season was the Knicks' 16th season in the NBA.

== Regular season ==
=== Season standings ===
Eastern Division	W	L	PCT	GB	Home	Road	Neutral	Div
x-Boston Celtics	60	20	.750	–	23–5	26–12	11–3	26–10
x-Philadelphia Warriors	49	31	.613	11	18–11	19–19	12–1	18–18
x-Syracuse Nationals	41	39	.513	19	18–10	11–19	12–10	17–19
New York Knicks	29	51	.363	31	19–15	2–23	8–13	11–25

x – clinched playoff spot

=== Game log ===
1961–62 game log
#	Date	Opponent	Score	High points	Record
1	October 19	Chicago	103–120	Johnny Green (27)	1–0
2	October 21	@ Philadelphia	95–132	Richie Guerin (29)	1–1
3	October 24	St. Louis	110–112	Willie Naulls (22)	2–1
4	October 26	Cincinnati	117–120	Richie Guerin (35)	3–1
5	October 28	@ Boston	102–132	Richie Guerin (19)	3–2
6	October 31	N Cincinnati	131–127	Willie Naulls (37)	4–2
7	November 1	@ Detroit	95–111	Johnny Green (23)	4–3
8	November 3	@ Chicago	118–129	Richie Guerin (37)	4–4
9	November 4	@ St. Louis	111–112	Richie Guerin (34)	4–5
10	November 7	@ Cincinnati	98–123	Willie Naulls (25)	4–6
11	November 8	N Chicago	130–108	Richie Guerin (33)	5–6
12	November 10	Detroit	124–118	Richie Guerin (36)	5–7
13	November 11	@ Syracuse	109–135	Willie Naulls (27)	5–8
14	November 14	Philadelphia	122–124	Phil Jordon (33)	6–8
15	November 15	N Syracuse	114–102	Green, Guerin (23)	6–9
16	November 17	Boston	104–100	Richie Guerin (38)	6–10
17	November 21	Chicago	109–107	Richie Guerin (47)	6–11
18	November 22	N Syracuse	109–110	Richie Guerin (37)	7–11
19	November 24	Los Angeles	100–89	Richie Guerin (29)	7–12
20	November 25	@ Boston	96–116	Richie Guerin (30)	7–13
21	November 28	Cincinnati	131–117	Richie Guerin (42)	7–14
22	December 1	Syracuse	100–118	Richie Guerin (27)	8–14
23	December 5	Philadelphia	122–105	Willie Naulls (24)	8–15
24	December 6	@ Detroit	97–133	Willie Naulls (22)	8–16
25	December 9	@ St. Louis	91–102	Willie Naulls (31)	8–17
26	December 10	@ Cincinnati	94–134	Richie Guerin (22)	8–18
27	December 12	Syracuse	126–124	Richie Guerin (29)	8–19
28	December 13	N Chicago	112–113	Richie Guerin (31)	8–20
29	December 15	N St. Louis	120–108	Al Butler (26)	8–21
30	December 17	Boston	117–109	Richie Guerin (26)	8–22
31	December 19	St. Louis	111–128	Johnny Green (30)	9–22
32	December 21	N Boston	103–122	Richie Guerin (23)	9–23
33	December 23	@ Boston	111–122	Willie Naulls (28)	9–24
34	December 25	Philadelphia	135–136 (2OT)	Richie Guerin (40)	10–24
35	December 27	@ Philadelphia	119–131	Willie Naulls (33)	10–25
36	December 29	Boston	100–110	Willie Naulls (24)	11–25
37	December 30	N Cincinnati	123–119	Richie Guerin (33)	12–25
38	January 2	Detroit	104–110	Richie Guerin (37)	13–25
39	January 3	N Cincinnati	111–122	Phil Jordon (21)	13–26
40	January 6	N Detroit	115–111	Johnny Green (33)	14–26
41	January 7	Syracuse	123–116	Richie Guerin (32)	14–27
42	January 12	N St. Louis	126–128	Richie Guerin (31)	15–27
43	January 14	@ Syracuse	118–141	Willie Naulls (27)	15–28
44	January 17	@ Los Angeles	121–129	Willie Naulls (36)	15–29
45	January 19	@ Los Angeles	107–108	Guerin, Naulls (28)	15–30
46	January 21	@ St. Louis	113–124	Richie Guerin (29)	15–31
47	January 22	N Chicago	131–94	Richie Guerin (31)	16–31
48	January 23	Chicago	109–103	Richie Guerin (25)	16–32
49	January 25	@ Chicago	117–102	Richie Guerin (30)	17–32
50	January 26	Boston	121–129	Al Butler (35)	18–32
51	January 27	@ Detroit	107–115	Willie Naulls (26)	18–33
52	January 30	Philadelphia	110–116	Richie Guerin (46)	19–33
53	January 31	@ Syracuse	109–138	Richie Guerin (22)	19–34
54	February 2	N Philadelphia	129–116	Willie Naulls (25)	19–35
55	February 3	Cincinnati	110–121	Richie Guerin (34)	20–35
56	February 4	@ Boston	114–130	Willie Naulls (29)	20–36
57	February 6	Los Angeles	112–116	Willie Naulls (29)	21–36
58	February 8	N Philadelphia	136–120	Guerin, Naulls (37)	21–37
59	February 9	Syracuse	111–120	Richie Guerin (34)	22–37
60	February 10	N Chicago	111–126	Richie Guerin (25)	22–38
61	February 11	Philadelphia	121–111	Willie Naulls (31)	22–39
62	February 14	Boston	112–125	Richie Guerin (51)	23–39
63	February 16	N Boston	104–127	Richie Guerin (32)	23–40
64	February 17	Los Angeles	128–121	Richie Guerin (39)	23–41
65	February 18	@ Syracuse	126–141	Willie Naulls (42)	23–42
66	February 20	Detroit	103–110	Willie Naulls (27)	24–42
67	February 22	N Los Angeles	116–118	Guerin, Naulls (32)	24–43
68	February 23	St. Louis	118–130	Willie Naulls (33)	25–43
69	February 24	N Syracuse	120–117	Willie Naulls (34)	25–44
70	February 25	@ Philadelphia	149–135	Richie Guerin (50)	26–44
71	February 27	Syracuse	130–120	Willie Naulls (42)	26–45
72	February 28	N Detroit	119–109	Richie Guerin (34)	27–45
73	March 2	N Philadelphia	169–147	Richie Guerin (39)	27–46
74	March 4	Philadelphia	129–128	Willie Naulls (39)	27–47
75	March 6	Boston	106–113	Richie Guerin (40)	28–47
76	March 7	N Detroit	112–119	Willie Naulls (37)	28–48
77	March 9	Los Angeles	100–122	Willie Naulls (27)	29–48
78	March 10	@ Chicago	116–128	Richie Guerin (36)	29–49
79	March 12	N Los Angeles	106–119	Richie Guerin (29)	29–50
80	March 14	@ Cincinnati	134–136	Richie Guerin (36)	29–51

== Awards and records ==
- Richie Guerin, All-NBA Second Team
