= 1961–62 Boston Celtics season =

NBA basketball team season (won NBA championship)

- NBA champions
- Division champions
- Head coach: Red Auerbach
- Arena: Boston Garden

Results
- Record: 60–20 (.750)
- Place: Division: 1st (Eastern)
- Playoff finish: NBA champions (Defeated Lakers 4–3)
- Stats at Basketball Reference

Local media
- Television: WHDH-TV
- Radio: WHDH

The 1961–62 Boston Celtics season was the Celtics' 16th season in the NBA. The Celtics defeated the Los Angeles Lakers to claim their fifth NBA Championship. They set new records with the most games won and the first NBA team to post 60 wins. Three years later, the Celtics would break this record with 62 wins in 1964–65 season.

== Offseason ==
=== NBA draft ===
The 1961 NBA draft took place on March 27, 1961.

Round	Pick	Player	Position	Nationality	School/Club team
1	9	Gary Phillips	Guard	United States	Houston
2	17	Al Butler	Guard	United States	Niagara

== Roster ==
1961–62 Boston Celtics roster
Players

Pos.	No.	Player	Height	Weight	DOB	From
SG	4	Carl Braun	6 ft 5 in (1.96 m)	180 lb (82 kg)		Colgate
G	14	Bob Cousy	6 ft 1 in (1.85 m)	175 lb (79 kg)		Holy Cross
F	20	Gene Guarilia	6 ft 5 in (1.96 m)	220 lb (100 kg)		George Washington
F	15	Tom Heinsohn	6 ft 7 in (2.01 m)	218 lb (99 kg)		Holy Cross
G	25	K. C. Jones	6 ft 1 in (1.85 m)	200 lb (91 kg)		San Francisco
G/F	24	Sam Jones	6 ft 4 in (1.93 m)	198 lb (90 kg)		North Carolina Central
F	18	Jim Loscutoff	6 ft 5 in (1.96 m)	220 lb (100 kg)		Oregon
PG	21	Gary Phillips	6 ft 3 in (1.91 m)	189 lb (86 kg)		Houston
G/F	23	Frank Ramsey	6 ft 3 in (1.91 m)	190 lb (86 kg)		Kentucky
C	6	Bill Russell	6 ft 10 in (2.08 m)	215 lb (98 kg)		San Francisco
F	16	Satch Sanders	6 ft 6 in (1.98 m)	210 lb (95 kg)		NYU

Coaches
Head coach
- Red Auerbach

Legend
- (DP) Unsigned draft pick
- (FA) Free agent
- (S) Suspended
- Injured

== Regular season ==
=== Season standings ===
Eastern Division	W	L	PCT	GB	Home	Road	Neutral	Div
x-Boston Celtics	60	20	.750	–	23–5	26–12	11–3	26–10
x-Philadelphia Warriors	49	31	.613	11	18–11	19–19	12–1	18–18
x-Syracuse Nationals	41	39	.513	19	18–10	11–19	12–10	17–19
New York Knicks	29	51	.363	31	19–15	2–23	8–13	11–25

=== Game log ===
1961–62 game log
#	Date	Opponent	Score	High points	Record
1	October 21	Detroit	102–137	Tom Heinsohn (26)	1–0
2	October 28	New York	102–132	Tom Heinsohn (19)	2–0
3	November 3	@ Philadelphia	112–98	Bob Cousy (27)	3–0
4	November 4	Syracuse	107–127	Bob Cousy (23)	4–0
5	November 9	N Detroit	116–110	Bill Russell (28)	4–1
6	November 11	Philadelphia	125–128	Bill Russell (28)	5–1
7	November 12	@ Chicago	112–96	Bill Russell (28)	6–1
8	November 14	@ St. Louis	119–117	Bill Russell (35)	7–1
9	November 16	@ Cincinnati	127–121	Tom Heinsohn (29)	8–1
10	November 17	@ New York	104–100	Bill Russell (25)	9–1
11	November 18	Los Angeles	103–101	Tom Heinsohn (26)	9–2
12	November 22	St. Louis	121–141	Heinsohn, Sanders (22)	10–2
13	November 23	@ Philadelphia	119–106	Tom Heinsohn (31)	11–2
14	November 25	New York	96–116	Frank Ramsey (26)	12–2
15	November 26	@ Detroit	107–101	Sam Jones (28)	13–2
16	November 28	N Detroit	108–116	Bob Cousy (27)	14–2
17	November 30	N Cincinnati	133–130	Tom Heinsohn (31)	14–3
18	December 1	Chicago	121–140	Bill Russell (26)	15–3
19	December 3	@ Cincinnati	119–96	Bill Russell (23)	16–3
20	December 6	N Cincinnati	102–103	Bill Russell (28)	17–3
21	December 8	Syracuse	111–123	Tom Heinsohn (30)	18–3
22	December 9	@ Syracuse	106–102	Sam Jones (30)	19–3
23	December 13	Philadelphia	113–123	Sam Jones (35)	20–3
24	December 14	N Chicago	108–123	Tom Heinsohn (28)	21–3
25	December 16	St. Louis	113–130	Bill Russell (25)	22–3
26	December 17	@ New York	117–109	Sam Jones (30)	23–3
27	December 19	@ Los Angeles	101–104	Sam Jones (26)	23–4
28	December 21	N New York	103–122	Satch Sanders (23)	24–4
29	December 23	New York	111–122	Bill Russell (31)	25–4
30	December 25	@ Syracuse	127–122	Tom Heinsohn (45)	26–4
31	December 26	Los Angeles	117–129	Bob Cousy (26)	27–4
32	December 28	@ St. Louis	117–109	Sam Jones (26)	28–4
33	December 29	@ New York	100–110	Bob Cousy (20)	28–5
34	December 30	@ Philadelphia	116–111	Sam Jones (36)	29–5
35	January 2	N St. Louis	99–136	Tom Heinsohn (25)	30–5
36	January 3	@ Detroit	103–112	Tom Heinsohn (23)	30–6
37	January 5	@ Cincinnati	124–103	Tom Heinsohn (31)	31–6
38	January 7	@ Los Angeles	118–95	Tom Heinsohn (28)	32–6
39	January 10	@ Chicago	90–103	Bob Cousy (21)	32–7
40	January 12	Cincinnati	125–141	Tom Heinsohn (32)	33–7
41	January 13	N Syracuse	127–117	Tom Heinsohn (23)	33–8
42	January 14	Philadelphia	136–145	Sam Jones (30)	34–8
43	January 17	@ Detroit	126–116	Sam Jones (33)	35–8
44	January 19	Syracuse	103–128	Bill Russell (24)	36–8
45	January 20	@ Syracuse	107–101	Bill Russell (24)	37–8
46	January 21	Detroit	124–120	Tom Heinsohn (43)	37–9
47	January 23	N Los Angeles	103–118	Tom Heinsohn (28)	38–9
48	January 24	St. Louis	135–123	Tom Heinsohn (28)	38–10
49	January 26	@ New York	121–129	Frank Ramsey (38)	38–11
50	January 27	@ Philadelphia	106–131	Satch Sanders (24)	38–12
51	January 28	Philadelphia	133–129 (OT)	Tom Heinsohn (31)	38–13
52	January 31	@ Chicago	122–115	Bob Cousy (27)	39–13
53	February 1	N Los Angeles	115–130	Sam Jones (22)	40–13
54	February 2	Cincinnati	124–143	Tom Heinsohn (24)	41–13
55	February 4	New York	114–130	Frank Ramsey (24)	42–13
56	February 5	@ Chicago	127–111	Tom Heinsohn (28)	43–13
57	February 6	@ St. Louis	129–114	Heinsohn, S. Jones (24)	44–13
58	February 8	@ Syracuse	110–122	Sam Jones (26)	44–14
59	February 9	Philadelphia	126–124	Heinsohn, S. Jones (23)	44–15
60	February 10	@ Philadelphia	106–107	Sam Jones (21)	44–16
61	February 11	Chicago	115–148	Tom Heinsohn (42)	45–16
62	February 13	N Chicago	117–138	Tom Heinsohn (30)	46–16
63	February 14	@ New York	112–125	Bob Cousy (26)	46–17
64	February 16	N New York	104–127	Bob Cousy (28)	47–17
65	February 18	@ Los Angeles	99–125	Frank Ramsey (19)	47–18
66	February 20	@ Los Angeles	115–96	Satch Sanders (26)	48–18
67	February 22	N Syracuse	106–134	Bob Cousy (32)	49–18
68	February 23	Syracuse	107–121	Tom Heinsohn (31)	50–18
69	February 24	@ Philadelphia	109–86	Bob Cousy (22)	51–18
70	February 25	@ Syracuse	110–106	Bill Russell (23)	52–18
71	February 27	N Chicago	100–115	Heinsohn, Russell (20)	53–18
72	February 28	@ Cincinnati	129–123 (OT)	Frank Ramsey (30)	54–18
73	March 2	@ St. Louis	120–138	Tom Heinsohn (22)	54–19
74	March 4	St. Louis	120–123	Tom Heinsohn (28)	55–19
75	March 6	@ New York	106–113	Tom Heinsohn (30)	55–20
76	March 7	Philadelphia	102–153	Sam Jones (23)	56–20
77	March 8	@ Chicago	108–102	Bill Russell (27)	57–20
78	March 9	@ Detroit	130–111	Tom Heinsohn (32)	58–20
79	March 11	Los Angeles	105–119	Sam Jones (20)	59–20
80	March 13	Syracuse	110–142	Satch Sanders (30)	60–20

== Playoffs ==
1962 playoff game log
Division Finals: 4–3 (home: 4–0; road: 0–3)

Game	Date	Team	Score	High points	High rebounds	High assists	Location Attendance	Series
1	March 24	Philadelphia	W 117–89	Sam Jones (20)	Bill Russell (30)	Bob Cousy (8)	Boston Garden	1–0
2	March 27	@ Philadelphia	L 106–113	Tom Heinsohn (24)	Bill Russell (20)	Bill Russell (6)	Philadelphia Civic Center	1–1
3	March 28	Philadelphia	W 129–114	Russell, Heinsohn (31)	Bill Russell (31)	Bob Cousy (10)	Boston Garden	2–1
4	March 31	@ Philadelphia	L 106–110	Bill Russell (31)	Bill Russell (30)	Bob Cousy (10)	Philadelphia Civic Center	2–2
5	April 1	Philadelphia	W 119–104	Bill Russell (29)	Bill Russell (26)	Russell, S. Jones (7)	Boston Garden	3–2
6	April 3	@ Philadelphia	L 99–109	Heinsohn, Cousy (22)	Bill Russell (22)	Bob Cousy (12)	Philadelphia Civic Center	3–3
7	April 5	Philadelphia	W 109–107	Sam Jones (28)	Bill Russell (22)	K. C. Jones (10)	Boston Garden	4–3

NBA Finals: 4–3 (home: 2–2; road: 2–1)

Game	Date	Team	Score	High points	High rebounds	High assists	Location Attendance	Series
1	April 7	Los Angeles	W 122–108	Sam Jones (24)	Bill Russell (28)	Bob Cousy (7)	Boston Garden; 7,467	1–0
2	April 8	Los Angeles	L 122–129	Tom Heinsohn (27)	Bill Russell (23)	Bob Cousy (11)	Boston Garden; 12,364	1–1
3	April 10	@ Los Angeles	L 115–117	Bill Russell (26)	Bill Russell (32)	Bob Cousy (8)	Los Angeles Memorial Sports Arena; 15,180	1–2
4	April 11	@ Los Angeles	W 115–103	Bill Russell (21)	Bill Russell (22)	Bob Cousy (13)	Los Angeles Memorial Sports Arena; 15,104	2–2
5	April 14	Los Angeles	L 121–126	Tom Heinsohn (30)	Bill Russell (29)	Bob Cousy (10)	Boston Garden; 13,909	2–3
6	April 16	@ Los Angeles	W 119–105	Sam Jones (35)	Bill Russell (24)	Bill Russell (10)	Los Angeles Memorial Sports Arena; 14,030	3–3
7	April 18	Los Angeles	W 110–107 (OT)	Bill Russell (30)	Bill Russell (40)	Bob Cousy (9)	Boston Garden; 13,909	4–3

1962 schedule

== Awards and honors ==
- Bill Russell, NBA Most Valuable Player
- Bill Russell, All-NBA Second Team
- Bob Cousy, All-NBA Second Team
- Tom Heinsohn, All-NBA Second Team
