= St. Bonaventure Bonnies men's basketball statistical leaders =

The St. Bonaventure Bonnies men's basketball statistical leaders are individual statistical leaders of the St. Bonaventure Bonnies men's basketball program in various categories, including points, assists, blocks, rebounds, and steals. Within those areas, the lists identify single-game, single-season, and career leaders. The Bonnies represent St. Bonaventure University in the NCAA Division I Atlantic 10 Conference.

St. Bonaventure began competing in intercollegiate basketball in 1919. However, the school's record book does not generally list records from before the 1950s, as records from before this period are often incomplete and inconsistent. Since scoring was much lower in this era, and teams played much fewer games during a typical season, it is likely that few or no players from this era would appear on these lists anyway.

The NCAA did not officially record assists as a statistic in Division I until the 1983–84 season, and blocks and steals until the 1985–86 season, but St. Bonaventure's record books includes players in these stats before these seasons. These lists are updated through the end of the 2020–21 season.

== Scoring ==
Career
Rk	Player	Points	Seasons
1	Greg Sanders	2,238	1974–75 1975–76 1976–77 1977–78
2	Andrew Nicholson	2,103	2008–09 2009–10 2010–11 2011–12
3	Earl Belcher	2,077	1977–78 1978–79 1979–80 1980–81
4	Bob Lanier	2,067	1967–68 1968–69 1969–70
5	Tom Stith	2,052	1958–59 1959–60 1960–61
6	Jaylen Adams	1,912	2014–15 2015–16 2016–17 2017–18
7	Essie Hollis	1,798	1973–74 1974–75 1975–76 1976–77
8	Fred Crawford	1,738	1960–61 1961–62 1962–63 1963–64
9	Marques Green	1,734	2000–01 2001–02 2002–03 2003–04
10	J.R. Bremer	1,732	1998–99 1999–00 2000–01 2001–02

Season
Rk	Player	Points	Season
1	Tom Stith	830	1960–61
2	Tom Stith	819	1959–60
3	Bob Lanier	757	1969–70
4	J.R. Bremer	738	2001–02
5	Bob Lanier	656	1967–68
6	Bob Lanier	654	1968–69
7	Earl Belcher	646	1979–80
8	Andrew Nicholson	645	2010–11
9	Greg Sanders	642	1977–78
10	Earl Belcher	637	1980–81

Single game
Rk	Player	Points	Season	Opponent
1	Bob Lanier	51	1968–69	Seton Hall
2	Bob Lanier	50	1969–70	Purdue
3	Tom Stith	48	1959–60	Manhattan
4	Marcus Posley	47	2015–16	Saint Joseph’s
5	Greg Sanders	46	1977–78	Detroit
	Tom Stith	46	1960–61	Niagara
	Tom Stith	46	1959–60	Providence
	Tom Stith	46	1959–60	Marshall
9	Jaylen Adams	44	2017–18	Saint Louis
	Andrew Nicholson	44	2010–11	Ohio

== Rebounds ==
Career
Rk	Player	Rebounds	Seasons
1	Bob Lanier	1,180	1967–68 1968–69 1969–70
2	Essie Hollis	939	1973–74 1974–75 1975–76 1976–77
3	Glenn Price	922	1971–72 1972–73 1973–74
4	Osun Osunniyi	898	2018–19 2019–20 2020–21 2021–22
5	Andrew Nicholson	887	2008–09 2009–10 2010–11 2011–12
6	George Carter	849	1964–65 1965–66 1966–67
7	Fred Crawford	789	1960–61 1961–62 1962–63 1963–64
8	Tim Waterman	744	1974–75 1975–76 1976–77 1977–78 1978–79
9	Delmar Harrod	739	1976–77 1977–78 1978–79 1979–80
10	Eric Stover	737	1979–80 1980–81 1981–82 1982–83

Season
Rk	Player	Rebounds	Season
1	Bob Lanier	416	1969–70
2	Bob Lanier	390	1968–69
3	Bob Lanier	374	1967–68
	Glenn Price	374	1973–74
5	Frank Mitchell	346	2025–26
6	Tim Waterman	314	1978–79
7	Bill Kenville	309	1951–52
8	George Carter	305	1966–67
9	Youssou Ndoye	302	2014–15
10	Glenn Price	295	1972–73

Single game
Rk	Player	Rebounds	Season	Opponent
1	Bob Lanier	27	1966–67	Loyola (Md.)
2	Bob Lanier	24	1969–70	Loyola (Md.)
3	Andrew Nicholson	23	2011–12	Duquesne
	John Connors	23	1956–57	Iona
	Bob Lanier	23	1969–70	Niagara
6	Osun Osunniyi	22	2018–19	Duquesne
	John Connors	22	1957–58	LeMoyne
	Bob Lanier	22	1969–70	DePaul
	John Connors	22	1957–58	Witchita State
10	Bob Lanier	21	1969–70	Duquesne
	Matt Gantt	21	1970–71	DePaul
	Glenn Price	21	1973–74	Loyola (Md.)
	Essie Hollis	21	1975–76	Rutgers
	Essie Hollis	21	1975–76	St. Joseph’s (Ind.)
	Essie Hollis	21	1976–77	DePaul

== Assists ==
Career
Rk	Player	Assists	Seasons
1	Marques Green	657	2000–01 2001–02 2002–03 2003–04
2	Shandue McNeill	616	1993–94 1994–95 1995–96 1996–97
3	Kyle Lofton	604	2018–19 2019–20 2020–21 2021–22
4	Jaylen Adams	590	2014–15 2015–16 2016–17 2017–18
5	Glenn Hagan	486	1974–75 1975–76 1976–77 1977–78
6	Tim Winn	449	1996–97 1997–98 1998–99 1999–00
7	Norman Clarke	419	1980–81 1981–82 1982–83 1983–84
8	Mark Jones	408	1979–80 1980–81 1981–82 1982–83
9	David Vanterpool	401	1991–92 1992–93 1993–94 1994–95
10	J.R. Bremer	334	1998–99 1999–00 2000–01 2001–02

Season
Rk	Player	Assists	Season
1	Marques Green	216	2002–03
2	Jaylen Adams	195	2016–17
3	Kyle Lofton	186	2019–20
4	Marques Green	179	2001–02
	Glenn Hagan	179	1977–78
6	Kyle Lofton	176	2021–22
7	Jim Elenz	173	1978–79
8	Shandue McNeill	172	1994–95
9	Charlon Kloof	164	2013–14
10	Dasonte Bowen	160	2025–26

Single game
Rk	Player	Assists	Season	Opponent
1	Kyle Lofton	17	2021–22	UMass
2	Jaylen Adams	14	2016–17	Saint Louis
	Jaylen Adams	14	2014–15	Duquesne
	Marques Green	14	2002–03	La Salle
5	Marques Green	13	2002–03	Toledo
	Marques Green	13	2002–03	Kent State
	Jim Elenz	13	1979–80	Wisconsin- Milwaukee
	Rob Lanier	13	1988–89	St. Joseph’s
	Shandue McNeill	13	1993–94	Rhode Island
10	Jaylen Adams	12	2015–16	Niagara
	Marques Green	12	2002–03	Connecticut
	James Singleton	12	1997–98	La Salle
	Mike Weber	12	1990–91	Rutgers
	Elmer Anderson	12	1985–86	Fairmont State
	Glenn Hagan	12	1977–78	Hofstra
	Jim Elenz	12	1978–79	UNC-Charlotte

== Steals ==
Career
Rk	Player	Steals	Seasons
1	Marques Green	325	2000–01 2001–02 2002–03 2003–04
2	Tim Winn	319	1996–97 1997–98 1998–99 1999–00
3	Shandue McNeill	281	1993–94 1994–95 1995–96 1996–97
4	David Vanterpool	247	1991–92 1992–93 1993–94 1994–95
5	Mark Jones	194	1979–80 1980–81 1981–82 1982–83
6	J.R. Bremer	185	1998–99 1999–00 2000–01 2001–02
7	Kyle Lofton	181	2018–19 2019–20 2020–21 2021–22
8	Jaylen Adams	170	2014–15 2015–16 2016–17 2017–18
9	Nii Nelson-Richards	164	1991–92 1992–93 1993–94 1994–95
10	Elmer Anderson	155	1983–84 1984–85 1985–86 1986–87

Season
Rk	Player	Steals	Season
1	Marques Green	107	2003–04
2	Tim Winn	103	1999–00
3	Marques Green	102	2001–02
4	Shandue McNeill	90	1994–95
5	Tim Winn	81	1998–99
6	Alvin Lott	80	1983–84
7	David Vanterpool	75	1993–94
8	Doug Turner	74	1985–86
9	Mark Jones	72	1982–83
	Melvin Council Jr	72	2024–25

Single game
Rk	Player	Steals	Season	Opponent
1	David Vanterpool	8	1994–95	Duquesne
2	Marques Green	7	2003–04	Saint Joseph’s
	Marques Green	7	2003–04	Robert Morris
	Mark Jones	7	1982–83	Rutgers
	Elmer Anderson	7	1985–86	California (Pa.)
	Michael Burnett	7	1988–89	Penn State
	Shandue McNeill	7	1994–95	Niagara
	Tim Winn	7	1997–98	Liberty
	Tim Winn	7	1997–98	Xavier
	Tim Winn	7	1999–00	Colorado State
	Melvin Council Jr.	7	2024–25	Siena

== Blocks ==
Career
Rk	Player	Blocks	Seasons
1	Osun Osunniyi	305	2018–19 2019–20 2020–21 2021–22
2	Caswell Cyrus	289	1996–97 1997–98 1998–99 1999–00
3	Andrew Nicholson	244	2008–09 2009–10 2010–11 2011–12
4	Youssou Ndoye	209	2011–12 2012–13 2013–14 2014–15
5	Eric Stover	163	1979–80 1980–81 1981–82 1982–83
6	Denzel Gregg	137	2013–14 2014–15 2015–16 2016–17
7	Chad Venning	100	2022–23 2023–24
8	Jerome Spellman	97	1994–95 1995–96
9	Essie Hollis	85	1973–74 1974–75 1975–76 1976–77
10	LaDarien Griffin	77	2015–16 2016–17 2017–18 2018–19
	Michael Lee	77	2004–05 2005–06 2006–07 2007–08

Season
Rk	Player	Blocks	Season
1	Caswell Cyrus	99	1997–98
2	Osun Osunniyi	94	2021–22
3	Osun Osunniyi	92	2018–19
4	Caswell Cyrus	84	1998–99
5	Andrew Nicholson	81	2008–09
6	Youssou Ndoye	78	2014–15
7	Youssou Ndoye	73	2013–14
8	Andrew Nicholson	63	2011–12
9	Osun Osunniyi	60	2020–21
10	Osun Osunniyi	59	2019–20

Single game
Rk	Player	Blocks	Season	Opponent
1	Andrew Nicholson	9	2008–09	Bucknell
2	Andrew Osasuyi	8	2025–26	Saint Joseph's
	Andrew Nicholson	8	2011–12	Xavier
	Andrew Nicholson	8	2008–09	Princeton
	Caswell Cyrus	8	1998–99	Siena
