= 1961 NCAA Men's Basketball All-Americans =

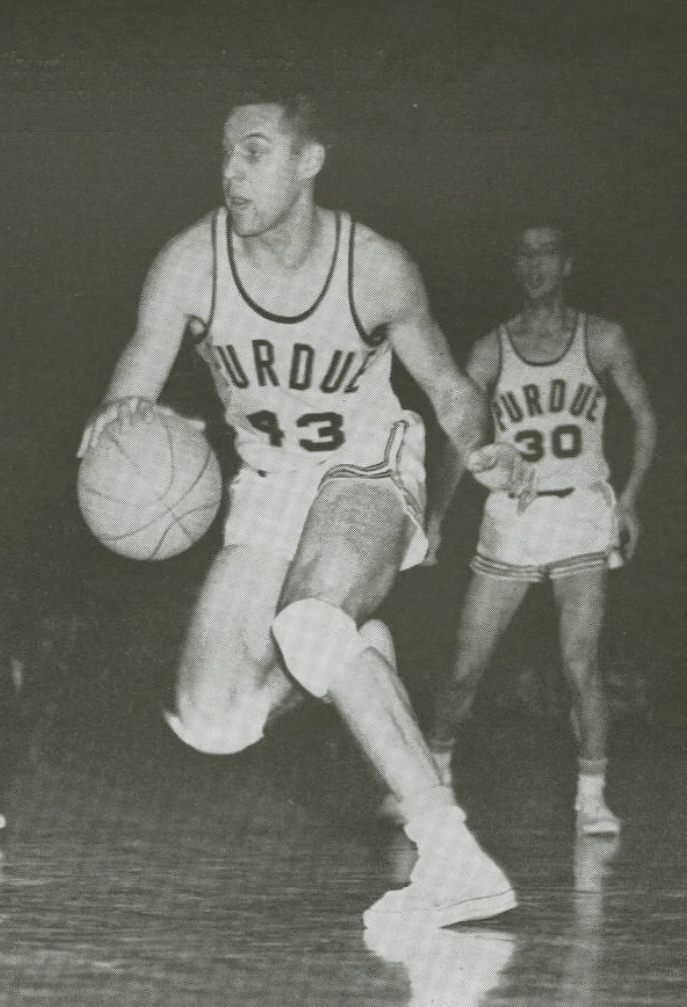
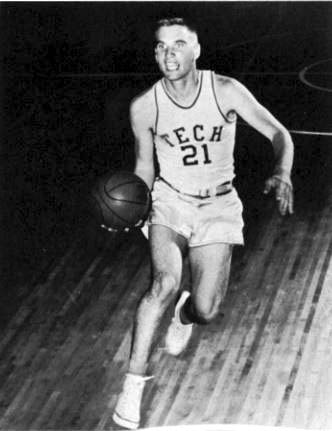
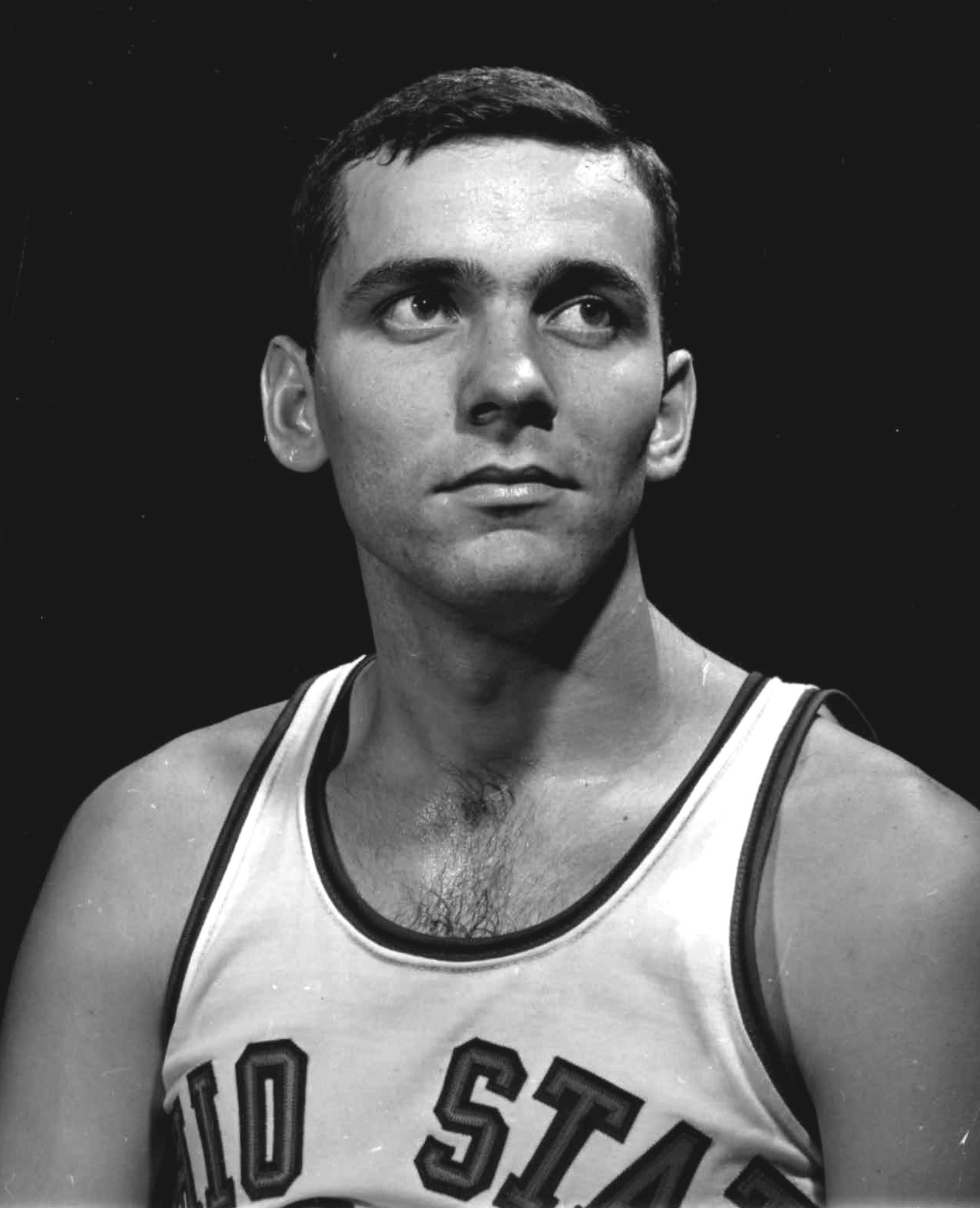
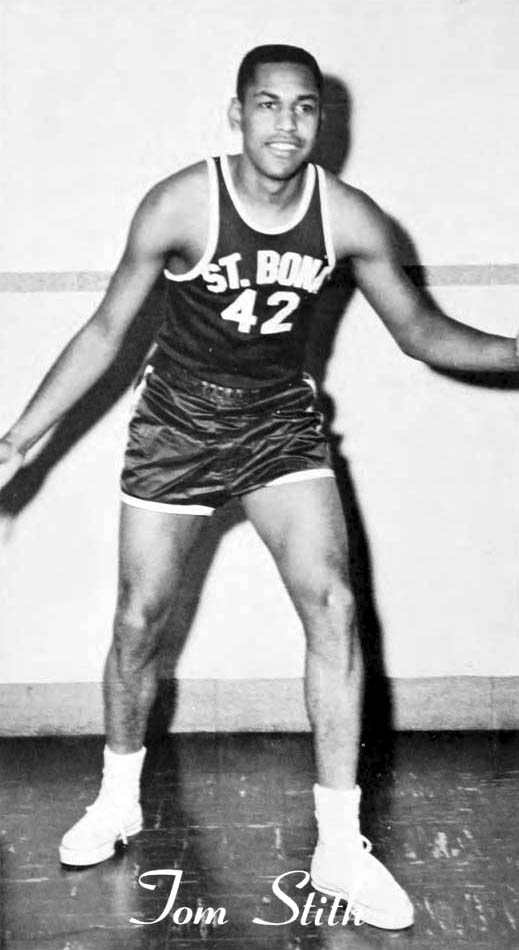
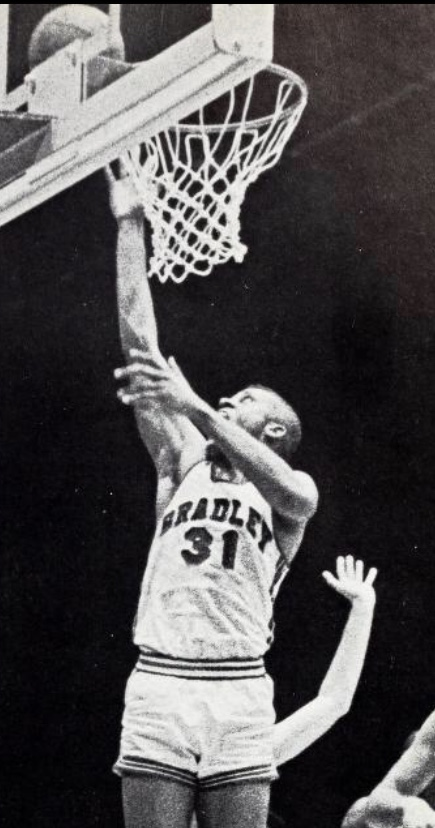
- The 1961 consensus first team. Clockwise from top left: Dischinger, Kaiser, Walker, Stith, Lucas.
- Awarded for: 1960–61 NCAA University Division men's basketball season

The consensus 1961 College Basketball All-American team, as determined by aggregating the results of seven major All-American teams. To earn "consensus" status, a player must win honors from a majority of the following teams: the Associated Press, the USBWA, The United Press International, the National Association of Basketball Coaches, the Newspaper Enterprise Association (NEA), The Sporting News, and the National Collegiate Association Bureau (NCAB). 1961 was the only year where the National Collegiate Association Bureau teams were used in determining consensus teams.

== 1961 Consensus All-America team ==
Consensus First Team
Player	Position	Class	Team
Terry Dischinger	F	Junior	Purdue
Roger Kaiser	G	Senior	Georgia Tech
Jerry Lucas	F/C	Junior	Ohio State
Tom Stith	G/F	Senior	St. Bonaventure
Chet Walker	F	Junior	Bradley

Consensus Second Team
Player	Position	Class	Team
Walt Bellamy	C	Senior	Indiana
Frank Burgess	G	Senior	Gonzaga
Tony Jackson	G	Senior	St. John's
Billy McGill	C	Junior	Utah
Larry Siegfried	G	Senior	Ohio State

== Individual All-America teams ==
All-America Team
All-America Team	First team		Second team		Third team	
All-America Team	Player	School	Player	School	Player	School
Associated Press	Terry Dischinger	Purdue	Walt Bellamy	Indiana	John Havlicek	Ohio State
Associated Press	Roger Kaiser	Georgia Tech	Frank Burgess	Gonzaga	Art Heyman	Duke
Associated Press	Jerry Lucas	Ohio State	Tony Jackson	St. John's	York Larese	North Carolina
Associated Press	Tom Stith	St. Bonaventure	Billy McGill	Utah	John Rudometkin	Southern California
Associated Press	Chet Walker	Bradley	Doug Moe	North Carolina	Larry Siegfried	Ohio State
USBWA/Look Magazine	Terry Dischinger	Purdue	No second or third teams (10-man first team)			
USBWA/Look Magazine	Roger Kaiser	Georgia Tech	No second or third teams (10-man first team)			
USBWA/Look Magazine	Jerry Lucas	Ohio State	No second or third teams (10-man first team)			
USBWA/Look Magazine	Billy McGill	Utah	No second or third teams (10-man first team)			
USBWA/Look Magazine	Tom Meschery	Saint Mary's	No second or third teams (10-man first team)			
USBWA/Look Magazine	Doug Moe	North Carolina	No second or third teams (10-man first team)			
USBWA/Look Magazine	Gary Phillips	Houston	No second or third teams (10-man first team)			
USBWA/Look Magazine	Larry Siegfried	Ohio State	No second or third teams (10-man first team)			
USBWA/Look Magazine	Tom Stith	St. Bonaventure	No second or third teams (10-man first team)			
USBWA/Look Magazine	Chet Walker	Bradley	No second or third teams (10-man first team)			
NABC	Walt Bellamy	Indiana	Dave DeBusschere	Detroit	Frank Burgess	Gonzaga
NABC	Terry Dischinger	Purdue	Tony Jackson	St. John's	Wayne Hightower	Kansas
NABC	Jerry Lucas	Ohio State	Roger Kaiser	Georgia Tech	Doug Moe	North Carolina
NABC	Tom Stith	St. Bonaventure	York Larese	North Carolina	John Rudometkin	Southern California
NABC	Chet Walker	Bradley	Billy McGill	Utah	Larry Siegfried	Ohio State
UPI	Terry Dischinger	Purdue	Walt Bellamy	Indiana	Frank Burgess	Gonzaga
UPI	Roger Kaiser	Georgia Tech	John Havlicek	Ohio State	Dave DeBusschere	Detroit
UPI	Jerry Lucas	Ohio State	Tony Jackson	St. John's	Art Heyman	Duke
UPI	Tom Stith	St. Bonaventure	Billy McGill	Utah	York Larese	North Carolina
UPI	Chet Walker	Bradley	John Rudometkin	Southern California	Larry Siegfried	Ohio State
NEA	Walt Bellamy	Indiana	Frank Burgess	Gonzaga	York Larese	North Carolina
NEA	Terry Dischinger	Purdue	Dave DeBusschere	Detroit	Tom Meschery	Saint Mary's
NEA	Roger Kaiser	Georgia Tech	Tony Jackson	St. John's	Doug Moe	North Carolina
NEA	Jerry Lucas	Ohio State	Billy McGill	Utah	John Rudometkin	Southern California
NEA	Tom Stith	St. Bonaventure	Larry Siegfried	Ohio State	Chet Walker	Bradley
Sporting News	Terry Dischinger	Purdue	Walt Bellamy	Indiana	No third team	
Sporting News	Roger Kaiser	Georgia Tech	Frank Burgess	Gonzaga	No third team	
Sporting News	Jerry Lucas	Ohio State	York Larese	North Carolina	No third team	
Sporting News	Larry Siegfried	Ohio State	Doug Moe	North Carolina	No third team	
Sporting News	Tom Stith	St. Bonaventure	Chet Walker	Bradley	No third team	
NCAB	Terry Dischinger	Purdue	Walt Bellamy	Indiana	No third team	
NCAB	Roger Kaiser	Georgia Tech	Frank Burgess	Gonzaga	No third team	
NCAB	Jerry Lucas	Ohio State	Tony Jackson	St. John's	No third team	
NCAB	Tom Stith	St. Bonaventure	Billy McGill	Utah	No third team	
NCAB	Chet Walker	Bradley	Larry Siegfried	Ohio State	No third team	

AP Honorable Mention:

- Bill Bridges, Kansas
- Carroll Broussard, Texas A&M
- Al Butler, Niagara
- Howie Carl, DePaul
- Len Chappell, Wake Forest
- Tom Chilton, East Tennessee St.
- Jeff Cohen, William & Mary
- Larry Comley, Kansas State
- Freddie Crawford, St. Bonaventure
- Dave DeBusschere, Detroit
- Bill Depp, Vanderbilt
- Bruce Drysdale, Temple
- Jack Egan, Saint Joseph's
- Johnny Egan, Providence
- Dave Fedor, Florida State
- Jack Foley, Holy Cross
- Jerry Graves, Mississippi State
- Bill Green, Colorado State
- Gus Guydon, Drake
- Jim Hadnot, Providence
- Ron Heller, Wichita State
- Charles Henke, Missouri
- Dick Hickox, Miami (FL)
- Wayne Hightower, Kansas
- Paul Hogue, Cincinnati
- Harold Hudgens, Texas Tech
- Don Kojis, Marquette
- Billy Ray Lickert, Kentucky
- Whitey Martin, St. Bonaventure
- Bill McClintock, California
- Lou Merchant, Florida
- Tom Meschery, Saint Mary's
- Del Ray Mounts, Texas Tech
- George Nattin, LSU
- Don Nelson, Iowa
- Mel Nowell, Ohio State
- Gary Phillips, Houston
- Cedric Price, Kansas State
- Chris Smith, Virginia Tech
- Rod Thorn, West Virginia
- John Tidwell, Michigan
- Jack Turner, Louisville
- Charlie Warren, Oregon
- Hank Whitney, Iowa State
- Bob Wiesenhahn, Cincinnati

== See also ==
- 1960–61 NCAA University Division men's basketball season
