= 1960 NCAA Men's Basketball All-Americans =

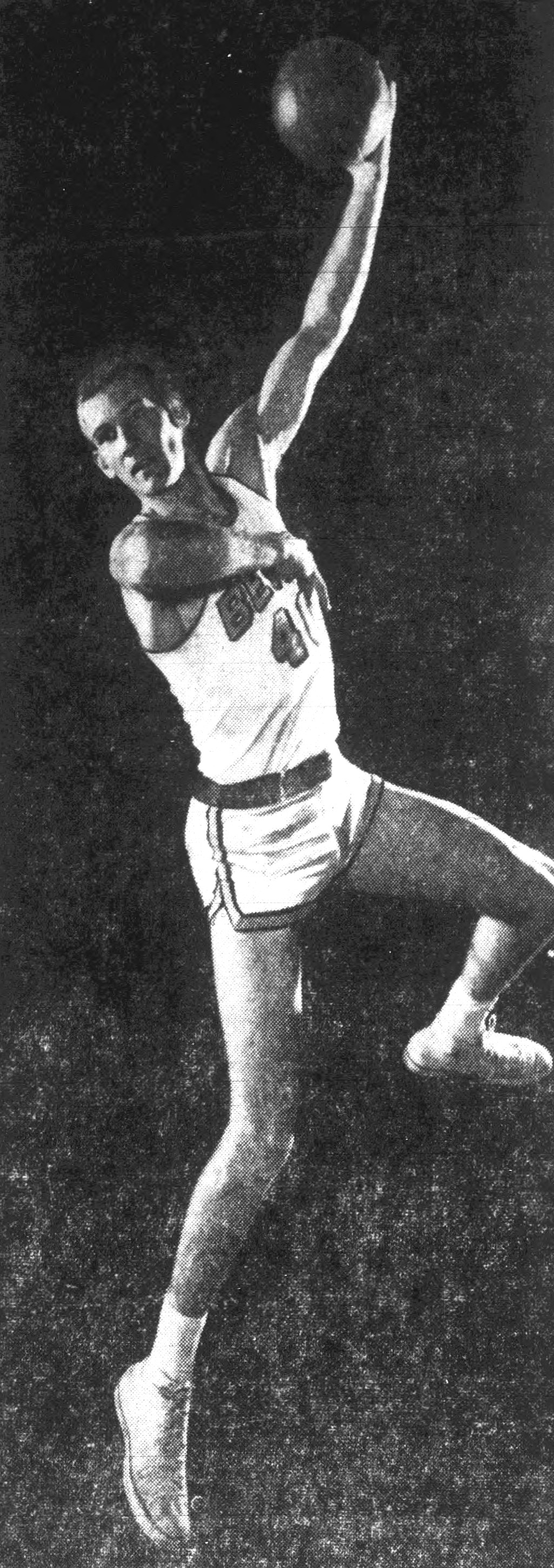
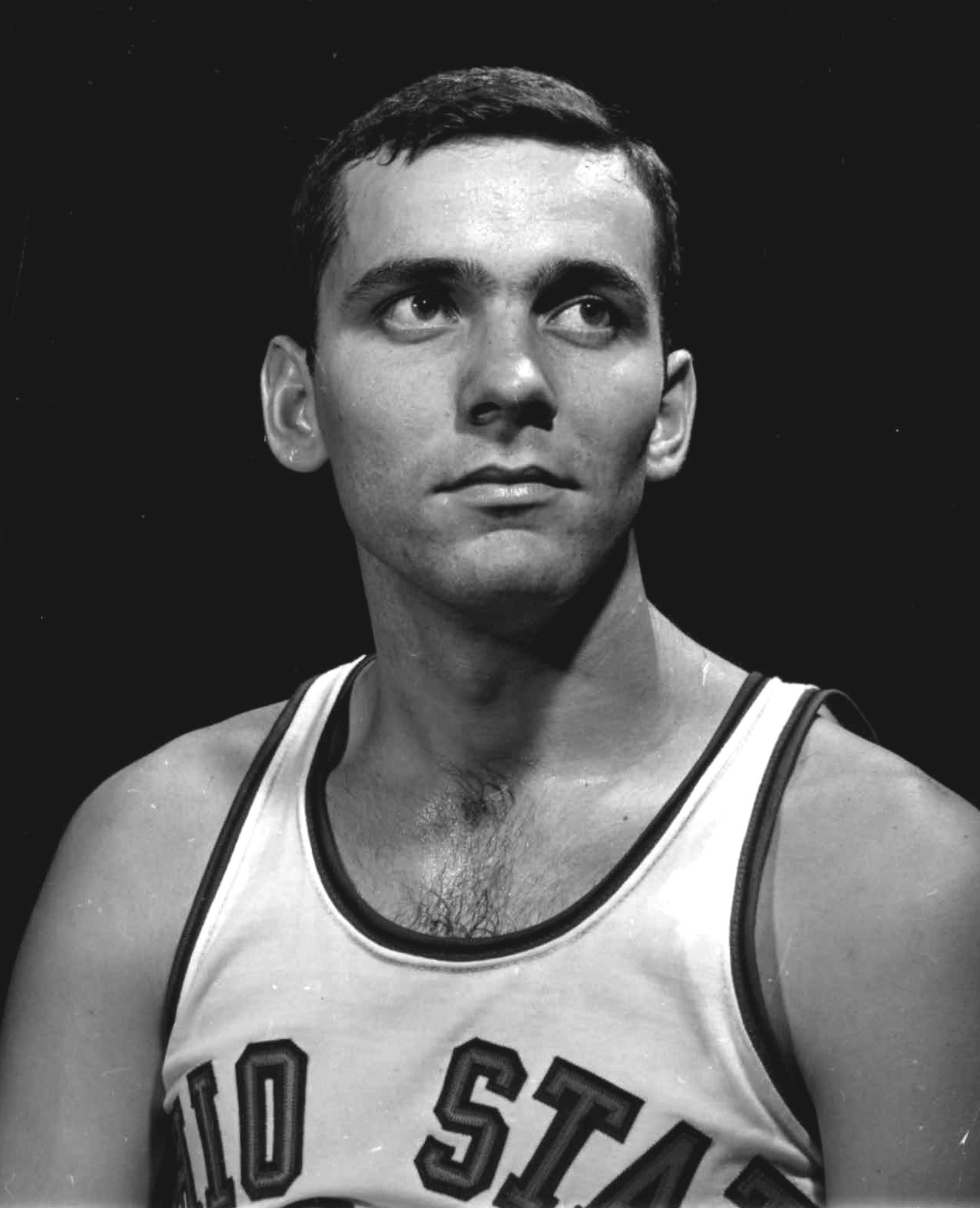
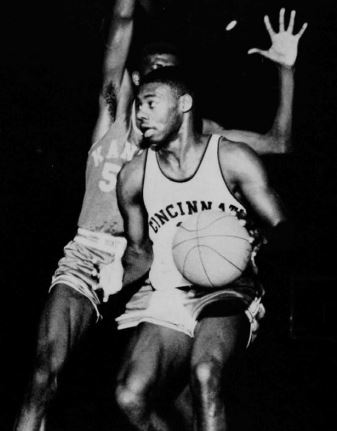
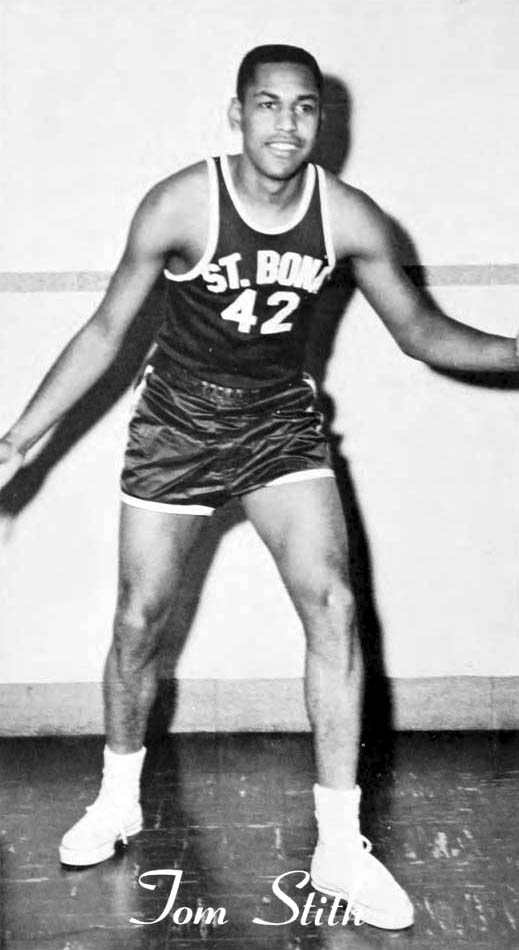
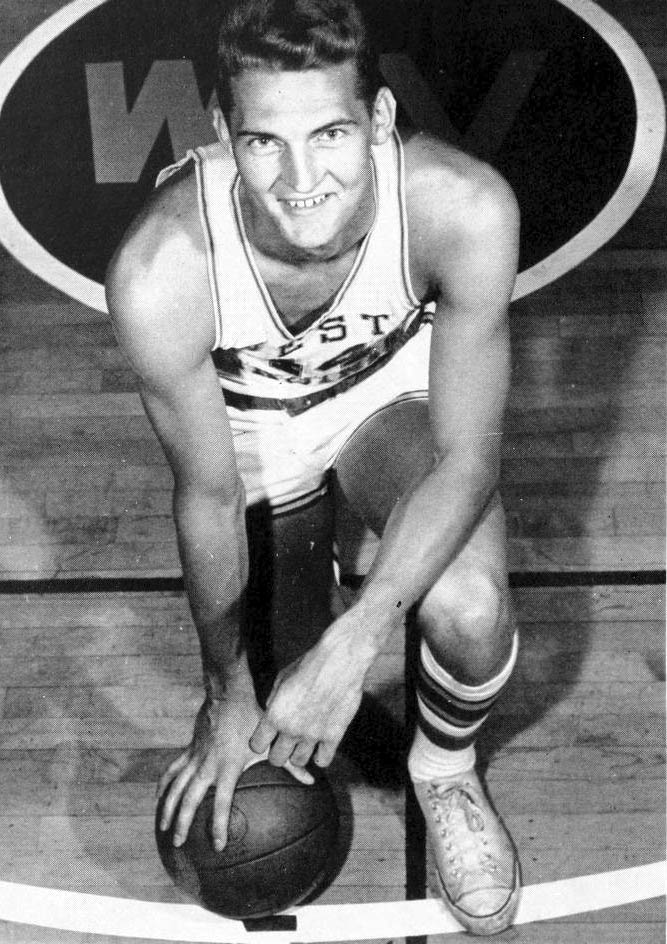
- Members of the 1960 Consensus All-America first team. Clockwise from upper left: Imhoff, Lucas, West, Stith, Robertson.
- Awarded for: 1959–60 NCAA University Division men's basketball season

The consensus 1960 College Basketball All-American team, as determined by aggregating the results of six major All-American teams. To earn "consensus" status, a player must win honors from a majority of the following teams: the Associated Press, the USBWA, The United Press International, the National Association of Basketball Coaches, the Newspaper Enterprise Association (NEA), and The Sporting News.

== 1960 Consensus All-America team ==
Consensus First Team
Player	Position	Class	Team
Darrall Imhoff	C	Senior	California
Jerry Lucas	F/C	Sophomore	Ohio State
Oscar Robertson	G	Senior	Cincinnati
Tom Stith	G/F	Junior	St. Bonaventure
Jerry West	G	Senior	West Virginia

Consensus Second Team
Player	Position	Class	Team
Terry Dischinger	F	Sophomore	Purdue
Tony Jackson	G	Junior	St. John's
Roger Kaiser	G	Junior	Georgia Tech
Lee Shaffer	F	Senior	North Carolina
Len Wilkens	G	Senior	Providence

== Individual All-America teams ==
All-America Team
All-America Team	First team		Second team		Third team	
All-America Team	Player	School	Player	School	Player	School
Associated Press	Darrall Imhoff	California	Terry Dischinger	Purdue	Dick Hickox	Miami (FL)
Associated Press	Tony Jackson	St. John's	Roger Kaiser	Georgia Tech	Bill Kennedy	Temple
Associated Press	Jerry Lucas	Ohio State	Tom Stith	St. Bonaventure	Billy McGill	Utah
Associated Press	Oscar Robertson	Cincinnati	Chet Walker	Bradley	Lee Shaffer	North Carolina
Associated Press	Jerry West	West Virginia	Len Wilkens	Providence	Horace Walker	Michigan State
USBWA/Look Magazine	Walt Bellamy	Indiana	No second or third teams (10-man first team)			
USBWA/Look Magazine	Terry Dischinger	Purdue	No second or third teams (10-man first team)			
USBWA/Look Magazine	Darrall Imhoff	California	No second or third teams (10-man first team)			
USBWA/Look Magazine	Roger Kaiser	Georgia Tech	No second or third teams (10-man first team)			
USBWA/Look Magazine	Jerry Lucas	Ohio State	No second or third teams (10-man first team)			
USBWA/Look Magazine	Oscar Robertson	Cincinnati	No second or third teams (10-man first team)			
USBWA/Look Magazine	Lee Shaffer	North Carolina	No second or third teams (10-man first team)			
USBWA/Look Magazine	Tom Stith	St. Bonaventure	No second or third teams (10-man first team)			
USBWA/Look Magazine	Jerry West	West Virginia	No second or third teams (10-man first team)			
USBWA/Look Magazine	Len Wilkens	Providence	No second or third teams (10-man first team)			
NABC	Darrall Imhoff	California	Terry Dischinger	Purdue	Jimmy Darrow	Bowling Green
NABC	Jerry Lucas	Ohio State	Tony Jackson	St. John's	Ron Johnson	Minnesota
NABC	Oscar Robertson	Cincinnati	Roger Kaiser	Georgia Tech	York Larese	North Carolina
NABC	Tom Stith	St. Bonaventure	Bobby Joe Mason	Bradley	Billy McGill	Utah
NABC	Jerry West	West Virginia	Chet Walker	Bradley	Tom Meschery	Saint Mary's
UPI	Darrall Imhoff	California	Jimmy Darrow	Bowling Green	Walt Bellamy	Indiana
UPI	Jerry Lucas	Ohio State	Terry Dischinger	Purdue	Dave DeBusschere	Detroit
UPI	Oscar Robertson	Cincinnati	Tony Jackson	St. John's	Satch Sanders	NYU
UPI	Tom Stith	St. Bonaventure	Roger Kaiser	Georgia Tech	Lee Shaffer	North Carolina
UPI	Jerry West	West Virginia	Chet Walker	Bradley	Horace Walker	Michigan State
NEA	Dave DeBusschere	Detroit	Walt Bellamy	Indiana	No third team	
NEA	Darrall Imhoff	California	Bill Kennedy	Temple	No third team	
NEA	Jerry Lucas	Ohio State	Lee Shaffer	North Carolina	No third team	
NEA	Oscar Robertson	Cincinnati	Tom Stith	St. Bonaventure	No third team	
NEA	Jerry West	West Virginia	Len Wilkens	Providence	No third team	
Sporting News	Darrall Imhoff	California	Terry Dischinger	Purdue	No third team	
Sporting News	Jerry Lucas	Ohio State	Roger Kaiser	Georgia Tech	No third team	
Sporting News	Oscar Robertson	Cincinnati	Bill Kennedy	Temple	No third team	
Sporting News	Tom Stith	St. Bonaventure	Lee Shaffer	North Carolina	No third team	
Sporting News	Jerry West	West Virginia	Len Wilkens	Providence	No third team	

AP Honorable Mention:

- Jay Arnette, Texas
- Walt Bellamy, Indiana
- Carroll Broussard, Texas A&M
- Al Bunge, Maryland
- Al Butler, Niagara
- Frank Burgess, Gonzaga
- Jeff Cohen, William & Mary
- Jimmy Darrow, Bowling Green
- Ralph Davis, Cincinnati
- Dave DeBusschere, Detroit
- Dave Denton, Georgia Tech
- Mark Dumars, Penn State
- Jim Hagan, Tennessee Tech
- Henry Hart, Auburn
- Wayne Hightower, Kansas
- Ron Johnson, Minnesota
- York Larese, North Carolina
- Bobby Joe Mason, Bradley
- Bill McClintock, California
- Don Ogorek, Seattle
- Gary Phillips, Houston
- Tom Sanders, NYU
- Chris Smith, Virginia Tech
- Herschell Turner, Nebraska
- John Werhas, USC

== See also ==
- 1959–60 NCAA University Division men's basketball season
