= Sam Stith =

American basketball player (born 1937)

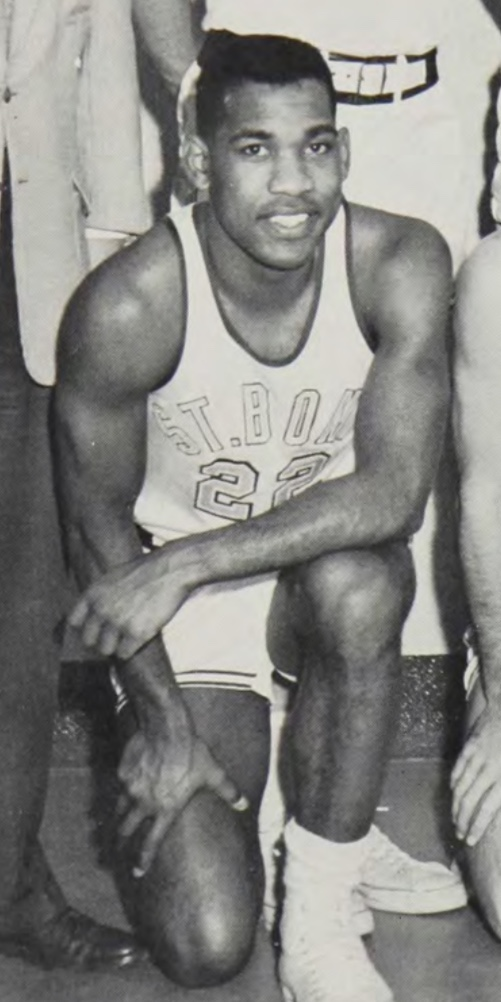
- Stith as a junior at St. Bonaventure

Personal information
- Born: July 22, 1937 (age 89) Greensville County, Virginia, U.S.
- Listed height: 6 ft 2 in (1.88 m)
- Listed weight: 185 lb (84 kg)

Career information
- High school: St. Francis (Queens, New York)
- College: St. Bonaventure (1957–1960)
- NBA draft: 1960: 8th round, 56th overall pick
- Drafted by: Cincinnati Royals
- Playing career: 1961–1964
- Position: Shooting guard
- Number: 17

Career history
- 1961–1962: New York Knicks
- 1962–1963: Allentown Jets
- 1963–1964: Wilkes-Barre Barons

Career highlights
- EPBL champion (1963); No. 22 retired by St. Bonaventure Bonnies
- Stats at NBA.com
- Stats at Basketball Reference

Samuel Elwood Stith (born July 22, 1937) is an American former professional basketball player. Stith was selected in the 1960 NBA draft by the Cincinnati Royals after a collegiate career at St. Bonaventure University. He also played in the Eastern Professional Basketball League, where in 1963 he won the league championship.

He is the brother of professional basketball player Tom Stith.

== Career statistics ==
Legend
GP	Games played	GS	Games started	MPG	Minutes per game
FG%	Field goal percentage	3P%	3-point field goal percentage	FT%	Free throw percentage
RPG	Rebounds per game	APG	Assists per game	SPG	Steals per game
BPG	Blocks per game	PPG	Points per game	**Bold**	Career high

=== NBA ===
==== Regular season ====
Year	Team	GP	MPG	FG%	FT%	RPG	APG	PPG
1961–62	New York	32	13.8	.364	.605	1.6	1.9	4.4
