= List of NBA rookie single-season scoring leaders =

This list exhibits the National Basketball Association's top rookie single-season scoring averages based on at least 70 games played or 1,400 points scored. Wilt Chamberlain holds the rookie record, averaging 37.6 points per game in 1959–60 NBA season. The NBA began recording 3-point field goals during the 1979–80 NBA season.

== List ==
*	Inducted into the Naismith Memorial Basketball Hall of Fame
^	Active NBA player
§	1st time eligible for Hall of Fame in 2026
**Bold**	Denotes NBA season leaders

Statistics accurate as of the 2025–26 NBA season.

Rank	Season	Player	Team	Games	FG	3PFG	FT	Pts	PPG
1	1959–60	Wilt Chamberlain*	Philadelphia Warriors	72	**1,065**	—	577	**2,707**	**37.6**
2	1961–62	Walt Bellamy*	Chicago Packers	79	973	—	549	2,495	31.6
3	1960–61	Oscar Robertson*	Cincinnati Royals	71	756	—	653	2,165	30.5
4	1969–70	Kareem Abdul-Jabbar*	Milwaukee Bucks	82	**938**	—	485	**2,361**	28.8
5	1968–69	Elvin Hayes*	San Diego Rockets	82	**930**	—	467	**2,327**	**28.4**
6	1984–85	Michael Jordan*	Chicago Bulls	82	837	9	630	**2,313**	28.2
7	1965–66	Rick Barry*	San Francisco Warriors	80	745	—	569	2,059	25.7
8	1962–63	Terry Dischinger	Chicago Zephyrs	57	525	—	402	1,452	25.5
9	1958–59	Elgin Baylor*	Minneapolis Lakers	70	605	—	532	1,742	24.9
10	1970–71	Geoff Petrie	Portland Trail Blazers	82	784	—	463	2,031	24.8
11	1971–72	Sidney Wicks	Portland Trail Blazers	82	784	—	441	2,009	24.5
12	1989–90	David Robinson*	San Antonio Spurs	82	690	0	613	1,993	24.3
13	1967–68	Earl Monroe*	Baltimore Bullets	82	742	—	507	1,991	24.3
14	1977–78	Walter Davis*	Phoenix Suns	81	786	—	387	1,959	24.2
15	1977–78	Bernard King*	New Jersey Nets	79	798	—	313	1,909	24.2
16	1982–83	Terry Cummings	San Diego Clippers	70	684	0	292	1,660	23.7
17	1996–97	Allen Iverson*	Philadelphia 76ers	76	625	155	382	1,787	23.5
18	1949–50	Alex Groza	Indianapolis Olympians	64	521	—	454	1,496	23.4
19	1992–93	Shaquille O'Neal*	Orlando Magic	81	733	0	427	1,893	23.4
20	1970–71	Pete Maravich*	Atlanta Hawks	81	738	—	404	1,880	23.2
21	1986–87	Ron Harper	Cleveland Cavaliers	82	734	20	386	1,874	22.9
22	2010–11	Blake Griffin^{§}	Los Angeles Clippers	82	696	7	446	1,845	22.5
23	1988–89	Mitch Richmond*	Golden State Warriors	79	649	33	410	1,741	22.0
24	1994–95	Glenn Robinson	Milwaukee Bucks	80	636	86	397	1,755	21.9
25	1979–80	Bill Cartwright	New York Knicks	82	665	0	451	1,781	21.7

== See also ==
- NBA records
- National Basketball Association
