= Tom Stith =

American basketball player (1939–2010)

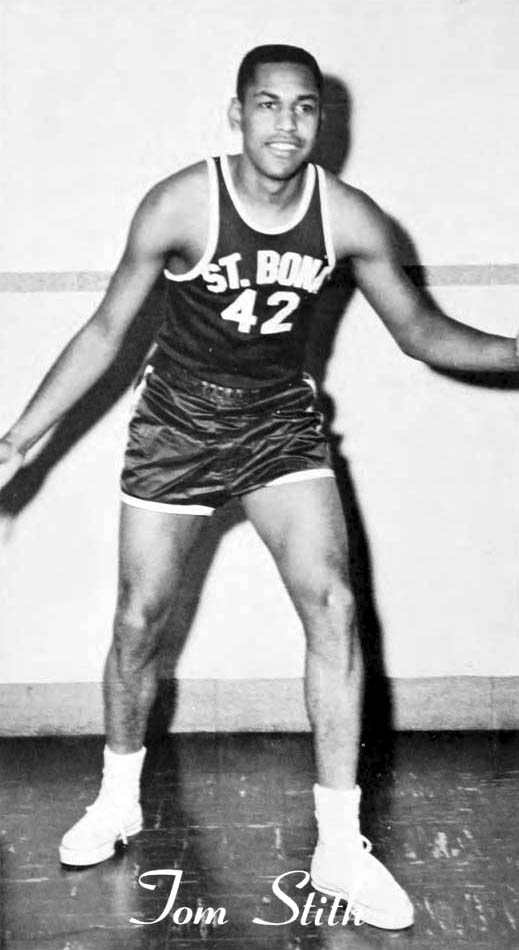
- Stith as a junior at St. Bonaventure

Personal information
- Born: January 21, 1939 Greensville County, Virginia, U.S.
- Died: June 13, 2010 (aged 71) Melville, New York, U.S.
- Listed height: 6 ft 5 in (1.96 m)
- Listed weight: 210 lb (95 kg)

Career information
- High school: St. Francis Preparatory (Brooklyn, New York)
- College: St. Bonaventure (1958–1961)
- NBA draft: 1961: 1st round, 2nd overall pick
- Drafted by: New York Knicks
- Playing career: 1962–1966
- Position: Small forward
- Number: 8

Career history
- 1962–1963: New York Knicks
- 1963–1964: Wilkes-Barre Barons
- 1964–1966: Allentown Jets

Career highlights
- All-EPBL First Team (1965); 2× Consensus first-team All-American (1960, 1961); No. 42 retired by St. Bonaventure Bonnies; Second-team Parade All-American (1957)

Career NBA statistics
- Points: 77
- Rebounds: 39
- Assists: 18
- Stats at NBA.com
- Stats at Basketball Reference
- Collegiate Basketball Hall of Fame

Thomas Alvin Stith (January 21, 1939 – June 13, 2010), born in Greensville County, Virginia, was an American professional basketball player who played for the NBA's New York Knicks. A 6'5" forward, Stith was an All-American at St. Bonaventure University in 1960 and 1961.

== College career ==
Stith attended St. Francis Preparatory School in Brooklyn and committed to St. Bonaventure University, where he and older brother Sam formed a formidable 1-2 punch. The Stith brothers posted a 52.0 points per game combined scoring average for the 1959–1960 season. Tom Stith became St. Bonaventure's first consensus All-American in 1960 and 1961. He was part of a team that won 99 consecutive home games during the then-Brown Indians' tenure at the Olean Armory, a streak that ended during Stith's senior year. Stith left St. Bonaventure as the school's all-time leading scorer, ending his career with 2,052 points. Stith finished second in the nation in scoring to Oscar Robertson in 1960, averaging 31.5 points per game, and he then finished third in 1961 with 29.6 points per game.

== Professional career ==
After completing his collegiate eligibility, Stith was selected by the New York Knicks as the second pick overall in the 1961 NBA draft, behind Indiana's Walt Bellamy. He made the team and played in 46 games over the 1961–62 seasons. However, Stith contracted tuberculosis only a month into the season, and his NBA career was cut short at 25 games and 3.2 points per game.

Stith played in the Eastern Professional Basketball League (EPBL) from 1963 to 1966. He was selected to the All-EPBL First Team in 1965.

== Death ==
Stith died on June 13, 2010, at the age of 71.

== Career statistics ==
Legend
| GP | Games played | GS | Games started | MPG | Minutes per game |
| FG% | Field goal percentage | 3P% | 3-point field goal percentage | FT% | Free throw percentage |
| RPG | Rebounds per game | APG | Assists per game | SPG | Steals per game |
| BPG | Blocks per game | PPG | Points per game | **Bold** | Career high |

=== NBA ===
==== Regular season ====
| Year | Team | GP | MPG | FG% | FT% | RPG | APG | PPG |
|---|---|---|---|---|---|---|---|---|
| 1962–63 | New York | 25 | 8.4 | .336 | .300 | 1.6 | .7 | 3.1 |
