= Terry Dischinger =

American basketball player and coach (1940–2023)

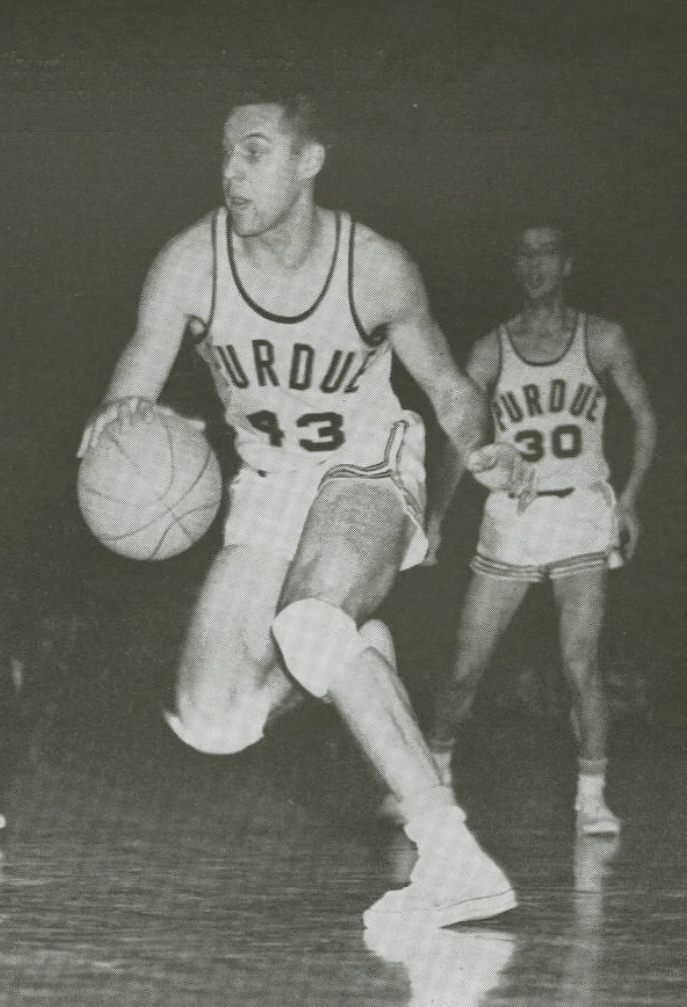
- Dischinger as a junior at Purdue, 1960-61

Personal information
- Born: November 21, 1940 Terre Haute, Indiana, U.S.
- Died: October 9, 2023 (aged 82) Lake Oswego, Oregon, U.S.
- Listed height: 6 ft 7 in (2.01 m)
- Listed weight: 189 lb (86 kg)

Career information
- High school: James A. Garfield (Terre Haute, Indiana)
- College: Purdue (1959–1962)
- NBA draft: 1962: 2nd round, 8th overall pick
- Drafted by: Chicago Zephyrs
- Playing career: 1962–1973
- Position: Small forward / shooting guard
- Number: 43, 18, 42

Career history

Playing
- 1962–1964: Chicago Zephyrs / Baltimore Bullets
- 1964–1972: Detroit Pistons
- 1972–1973: Portland Trail Blazers

Coaching
- 1971: Detroit Pistons

Career highlights
- 3× NBA All-Star (1963–1965); NBA Rookie of the Year (1963); NBA All-Rookie First Team (1963); 2× Consensus first-team All-American (1961, 1962); Consensus second-team All-American (1960); Second-team Parade All-American (1958)

Career NBA statistics
- Points: 9,012 (13.8 ppg)
- Rebounds: 3,646 (5.6 rpg)
- Assists: 1,151 (1.8 apg)
- Stats at NBA.com
- Stats at Basketball Reference
- Collegiate Basketball Hall of Fame
Medals
Men's basketball
Representing United States
Olympic Games
Gold medal – first place	1960 Rome	Team competition

Terry Gilbert Dischinger (/ˈdɪʃɪŋər/ DISH-ing-ər; November 21, 1940 – October 9, 2023) was an American professional basketball player in the National Basketball Association (NBA). Dischinger was a three-time NBA All-Star and the 1963 NBA Rookie of the Year, after averaging 28 points per game in his three seasons at Purdue University.

In 2019, Dischinger was inducted to the College Basketball Hall of Fame. In 2010, the 1960 United States men's Olympic basketball team of which Dischinger was a member, was collectively inducted into the Naismith Memorial Basketball Hall of Fame. Dischinger practiced orthodontics after his NBA career.

== Early life ==
Dischinger attended James A. Garfield High School in Terre Haute, Indiana. The son of the football coach, Dischinger was a 3-year letter winner in basketball and was twice being named the Purple Eagles' MVP. During his senior season (1957–58), he was selected as captain and was the MVP of the 1958 Indiana All-Star team. Dischinger was also a 1958 Parade All-American.

During his high school career, Dischinger earned all-state honors in basketball, while being coached by Willard Kehrt, and in football and track, being coached by his father, Donas Dischinger. As a high school freshman, he was a member of Terre Haute's 1955 Babe Ruth League world championship baseball team. He was also a member of Garfield High's 1955 IHSAA Sectional Championship team; this was the deepest run Garfield would make during his high school career. City rival, Terre Haute Gerstmeyer Tech, was the main opposition to Garfield during Dischinger's career.

== College career ==
Dischinger attended Purdue University in West Lafayette, Indiana, where he played under Coach Ray Eddy in the Big Ten Conference.

=== Sophomore and Junior (1959–1961) ===
In his first varsity season as a sophomore (freshmen were not allowed to play varsity by the NCAA in his era), the 6'7", 190 lb guard/forward was named a Second Team All-American, leading the 11–12 Boilermakers, averaging 26.3 points and 14.3 rebounds. On January 9, 1960, Dischinger pulled down 26 rebounds against Wisconsin, the second most in a game behind Carl McNulty's school record of 27 in 1951. Dishinger made the 1960 Olympic Team after his sophomore season.

During his junior season (1960–1961), Purdue finished 16–7. Dischinger was named a First Team All-American and led the conference in scoring with 28.2 points and 13.4 rebounds a game. On February 25, 1961—a number of online stories say "Christmas Day in 1961" but that is a mistake—Dischinger scored a career high 52 points against Michigan State on 19 field goals and 14 free throws. The 52 points broke Jerry Lucas's prior Big Ten Conference record of 48. In his next game, he made a single-game school record 21 free throws against Iowa on February 27, 1961.

=== Senior (1961–1962) ===
Purdue finished 17–7 in Dischinger's senior season.

In his last college game against Michigan on March 12, 1962, Dischinger played with a sprained ankle and scored 30 points.

His 459 total points in his senior season led the conference in scoring for a third consecutive season. He was named a second straight First Team All-American while leading the Big Ten Conference in both scoring (30.3 points) and rebounding (13.4). He attempted a single-season Purdue record 350 free throws in his senior season.

=== College career summary (1959–1962) ===
When he left Purdue, Dischinger held almost every Purdue scoring record. Many would be broken by Dave Schellhase and Rick Mount within the next decade. Dischinger was named All-Big Ten three consecutive seasons and selected as the Purdue MVP for each season. He currently holds school records for nine 40-plus-point games, 713 made free throws with 871 attempted, 14.3 rebounds a game and the second most in a career with 958 behind Joe Barry Carroll's 1,148 mark.

Dischinger averaged 28.3 points a game in his three varsity seasons, in which he led the conference in scoring each season. He's currently the sixth-highest scorer in Boilermaker history with a total of 1,979 points.

Overall, Dischinger averaged a double-double of 28.3 points and 13.7 rebounds, shooting 55.3% from the floor and 81.9% from the line in 70 career games at Purdue.

== 1960 Olympics ==
Dischinger was selected to the USA men's basketball team that won the gold medal at the 1960 Rome Olympics under head coach Pete Newell; at age 19, and just finishing his sophomore year of college, he was the youngest member of the team. As a starting guard/forward, he was teamed with future Basketball Hall of Famers Oscar Robertson, Jerry West, and Jerry Lucas. The team was named to the Naismith Basketball Hall of Fame in 2010. He started all 8 games, scoring 90 total points, with an 11.3 points-per-game average as the fourth-leading scorer on the team.

"It was a fairy tale because I played with my idol, Oscar Robertson. The experience made me a much better player." said Dischinger.

== Professional career ==
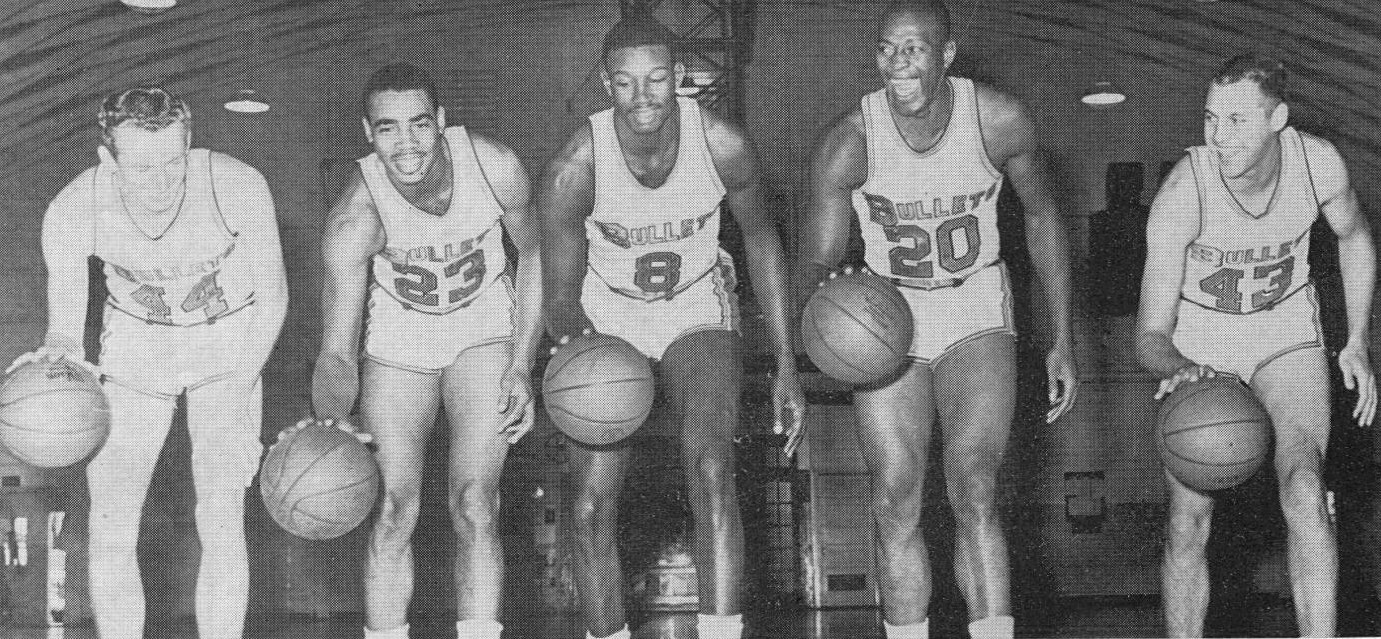
Members of the 1963–64 Baltimore Bullets, From left to rightː Rod Thorn, Charles Hardnett, Walt Bellamy, Gus Johnson and Terry Dischinger. Thorn, Bellamy and Johnson were elected to the Naismith Basketball Hall of Fame as players while Dischinger was elected as part of the 1960 Olympic team.

=== Chicago Zephyrs, Baltimore Bullets (1962–1964) ===
Dischinger was the first pick of the second round (#8 overall) by the Chicago Zephyrs in the 1962 NBA draft.

Dischinger had an immediate impact in the NBA, as won the NBA Rookie of the Year Award in the 1962–63 season, averaging 25.5 points, 8.0 rebounds and 3.1 assists in 57 games. The Zephyrs finished 25–55 under coaches Jack McMahon (12–26) and Slick Leonard (13–29).

"During my rookie year I wanted to obtain my Chemical Engineering degree from Purdue, so Chicago let me attend school and play on weekends and holidays." Dischinger recalled. "One time after class I left Purdue at 4 PM, taped my ankles in a cab and played that night in San Francisco. It wasn't that tough of a year because I received my degree, the rookie of the year award, and was paid to play the game I loved."

Dischinger was named rookie of the year over four future Hall of Famers, whom he joined on the 1962–63 NBA All-Rookie Team: Zelmo Beaty, Dave DeBusschere, John Havlicek and Chet Walker.

After his rookie season the Zephyrs moved to Baltimore, Maryland and became the Baltimore Bullets (today's Washington Wizards). In his second season, Dischinger averaged 20.8 points and 8.3 rebounds as Baltimore finished 31–49 under Hall of Fame Coach Leonard. Dischinger played alongside future Hall of Famers Walt Bellamy and Rod Thorn, as well as Kevin Loughery, Gene Shue and Sihugo Green.

=== Detroit Pistons – 1st stint (1964–1965) ===
In his third season in the NBA, Dischinger was traded to the Detroit Pistons. On June 18, 1964, Dischinger was traded by the Bullets with Don Kojis and Rod Thorn to the Pistons for Bob Ferry, Bailey Howell, Les Hunter, Wali Jones and Don Ohl. With Detroit, he averaged 18.2 points a game, and was chosen as an NBA All-Star for the third consecutive season.

=== Military service (1965–1967) ===
Following his third NBA season, Dischinger left the NBA for military service.

"I was in the ROTC in college and was told I could fulfill my commission with the National Guard," said Dischinger. "But I ended up serving for two years in Hawaii. It was really bad for my basketball career but it was there that I decided to practice dentistry when my playing days ended."

Dischinger spent the next two years serving in the United States Army. There, he continued to play basketball, was named to the all-Rainbow Classic team (1965), led the Rainbow Classic in scoring (91-pts, 30.3 ppg), was named MVP for the Army all-Pacific team, served as a coach of the all-Army basketball team, and coached a State Department team on a tour of Central America in 1966.

=== Detroit Pistons – 2nd stint (1967–1972) ===
After returning to the NBA in 1967, he returned to the Pistons, where he played for the next five seasons. During the 1971–72 season, he coached in two games as a player-coach at the age of 31. In six total seasons in Detroit, Dischinger averaged 12.2 points, 5.2 rebounds and 1.6 assists in 452 games, playing alongside Hall of Famers Bob Lanier, Dave Bing and Walt Bellamy.

"When you were winning it was great, and when you weren't it wasn't so great, but that's true anywhere, said Dischinger of his Pistons tenure. "I played with a bunch of great players like Dave DeBusschere, Dave Bing, Bob Lanier, Tom Van Arsdale and Jimmy Walker. We had a special relationship and I loved my basketball life."

=== Portland Trail Blazers (1972–1973) ===
July 31, 1972, Dischinger was traded by the Pistons to the Portland Trail Blazers for Fred Foster. He averaged 6.1 points and 3.0 rebounds in 15 minutes per game for the 21–61 Blazers under Coach Jack McCloskey during the 1972–73 season.

Dischinger was involved in an altercation in 1973, with Mike Price of the Philadelphia 76ers. "Dale Schlueter and LaRue Martin got into a fight, and I went over to help out and Price reacted," Dischinger recalled. "It was a one-punch thing, and you know how those things are in sports. I had teeth loosened, but I didn't lose any. I thought I had a tooth in my mouth, but I felt in there, and it was chewing gum. I threw it away. I decided it was time to retire after that year," Dischinger said, jokingly, "if that is the only thing you're remembered for, something is wrong."

After his one season in Portland, he retired after nine seasons in the NBA.

Overall, in his NBA career, Dischinger averaged 13.8 points, 5.6 rebounds, 1.8 assists and had a .506 field goal percentage in 652 games.

== Personal life ==
Following his retirement as a player in 1973, Dischinger completed dental school in Memphis, Tennessee. With his wife Mary, he returned to Portland, where he had ended his NBA career, to begin an orthodontic practice in the Portland suburb of Lake Oswego. He also served as an analyst for Trail Blazers telecasts.

Dischinger and his wife Mary were married for more than fifty years and have three children and nine grandchildren. His grandson Michael Loomis played basketball at Northwest Christian University in Eugene, Oregon.

Dischinger graduated from Purdue University with a BS in chemical engineering. He graduated from the University of Tennessee College of Dentistry in Nashville where he earned his DDS and was valedictorian of his class.

Dischinger died at age 82 from complications of Alzheimer's disease in Lake Oswego, Oregon on October 9, 2023.

== Honors ==
- In 1989, Dischinger was inducted into the Indiana Basketball Hall of Fame.
- Dischinger was elected to the Purdue Intercollegiate Athletics Hall Of Fame in 1994.
- In 1995, Dischinger was named to the NFHS Hall of Fame.
- Dischinger was inducted into the Indiana High School Athletic Association Hall of Fame in 1995.
- Dischinger was named to the "Purdue Centennial Basketball Team" in 1997. Other members were: Dave Charters (1909–11) Charles "Stretch" Murphy (1928–30), John Wooden (1930–32), Jewell Young (1936–38), Paul Hoffman (1944–47), Joe Sexson (1954–56), Dave Schellhase (1964–66), Rick Mount (1968–70), Joe Barry Carroll (1977–80), Troy Lewis (1985–88) and Glenn Robinson (1993–94).
- The 1960 United States men's Olympic basketball team of which Dischinger was a member, was collectively inducted into the Naismith Memorial Basketball Hall of Fame in 2010.
- In 2019 Dischinger was inducted to the College Basketball Hall of Fame.

== NBA career statistics ==
Legend
GP	Games played	GS	Games started	MPG	Minutes per game
FG%	Field goal percentage	3P%	3-point field goal percentage	FT%	Free throw percentage
RPG	Rebounds per game	APG	Assists per game	SPG	Steals per game
BPG	Blocks per game	PPG	Points per game	**Bold**	Career high

=== Regular season ===
Year	Team	GP	MPG	FG%	FT%	RPG	APG	PPG
1962–63	Chicago	57	**40.2**	.512	.770	8.0	**3.1**	**25.5**
1963–64	Baltimore	**80**	35.2	.496	.776	**8.3**	2.0	20.8
1964–65	Detroit	80	33.7	.493	.755	6.0	2.5	18.2
1967–68	Detroit	78	24.8	.494	.762	6.2	1.5	13.1
1968–69	Detroit	75	19.4	.515	.730	4.3	1.2	8.8
1969–70	Detroit	75	23.4	.526	.722	4.9	1.4	11.4
1970–71	Detroit	65	28.5	**.535**	.763	5.2	1.7	11.8
1971–72	Detroit	79	26.1	.514	**.780**	4.3	1.2	9.4
1972–73	Portland	63	15.4	.476	.667	3.0	1.6	6.1
Career		652	27.4	.506	.758	5.6	1.8	13.8
All-Star		3	14.7	.467	.833	2.7	0.7	6.3

=== Playoffs ===
Year	Team	GP	MPG	FG%	FT%	RPG	APG	PPG
1968	Detroit	6	25.7	.375	.737	4.8	1.5	9.3
Career		6	25.7	.375	.737	4.8	1.5	9.3

== Head coaching record ==
Legend
Regular season	G	Games coached	W	Games won	L	Games lost	W–L %	Win–loss %
Playoffs	PG	Playoff games	PW	Playoff wins	PL	Playoff losses	PW–L %	Playoff win–loss %

Team	Year	G	W	L	W–L%	Finish	PG	PW	PL	PW–L%	Result
Detroit	1971–72	2	0	2	.000	(interim)	–	–	–	–	—
Career		2	0	2	.000		–	–	–	–	

== See also ==
- List of NCAA Division I men's basketball career free throw scoring leaders
- List of National Basketball Association top rookie scoring averages
