= Tony Jackson (basketball, born 1942) =

American basketball player

Personal information
- Born: November 7, 1942 Brooklyn, New York, U.S.
- Died: October 28, 2005 (aged 62) Brooklyn, New York, U.S.
- Listed height: 6 ft 4 in (1.93 m)
- Listed weight: 185 lb (84 kg)

Career information
- High school: Thomas Jefferson (Brooklyn, New York)
- College: St. John's (1958–1961)
- NBA draft: 1961: 3rd round, 24th overall pick
- Drafted by: New York Knicks
- Playing career: 1961–1969
- Position: Small forward / shooting guard
- Number: 24, 25

Career history
- 1961–1963: Chicago Majors
- 1967–1968: New Jersey Americans / New York Nets
- 1968: Minnesota Pipers
- 1968–1969: Houston Mavericks

Career highlights
- ABA All-Star (1968); 2× Consensus second-team All-American (1960, 1961); Third-team All-American – NABC (1959); National Invitation Tournament MVP (1959); Haggerty Award (1961); No. 24 retired by St. John's; First-team Parade All-American (1957)
- Stats at Basketball Reference

Tony B. Jackson (November 7, 1942 – October 28, 2005) was an American professional basketball player.

Jackson was born in the borough of Brooklyn in New York City. A standout player under coach Joe Lapchick at St. John's University from 1958 to 1961, Jackson was six feet, four inches tall and played two seasons in the American Basketball League and two seasons in the American Basketball Association. Jackson scored 53 points (including 12 three-point baskets) while playing for the Chicago Majors of the ABL on March 14, 1962. He died of cancer in 2005 in Brooklyn.

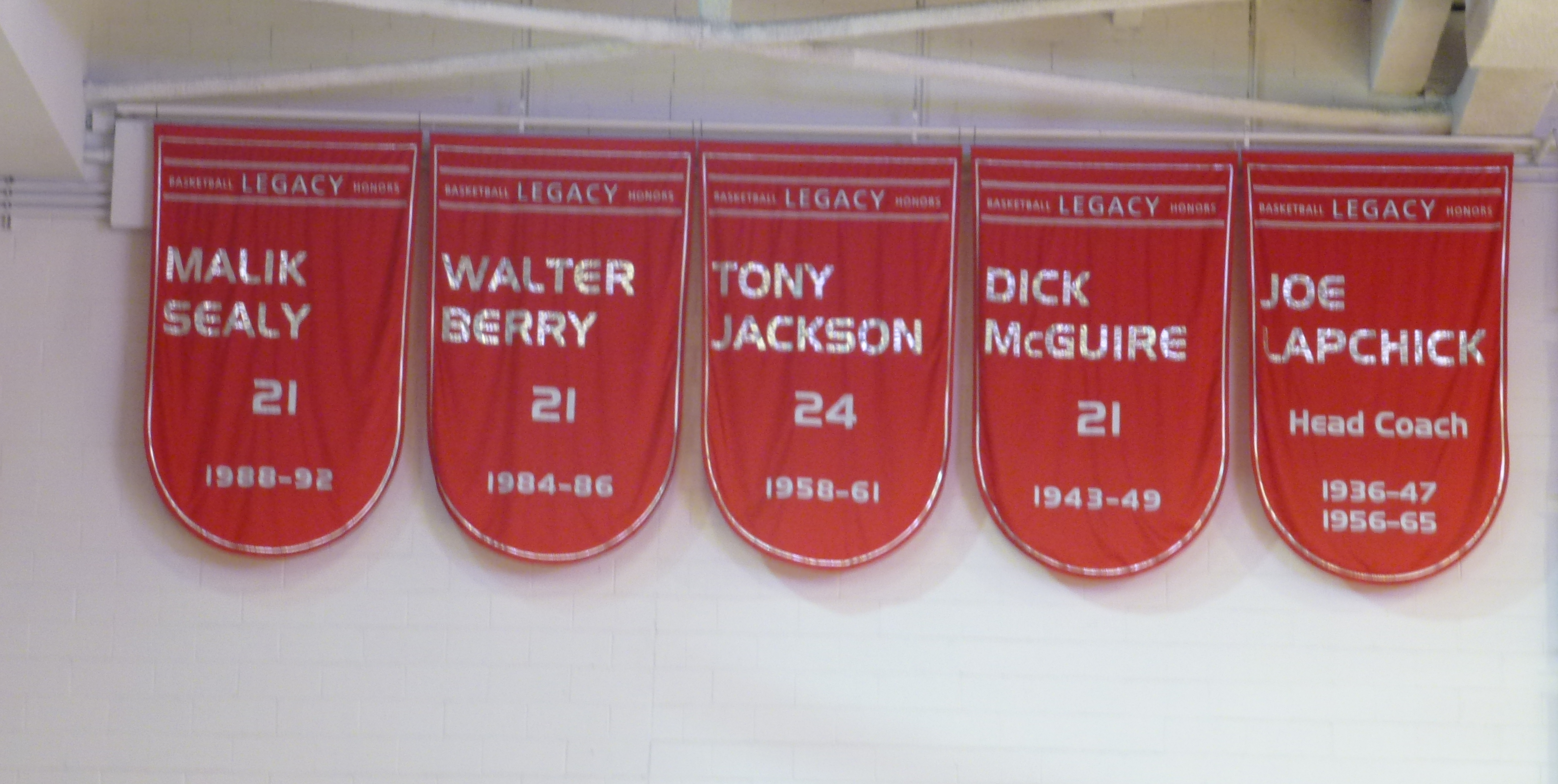
Tony Jackson's retired number

Jackson, Connie Hawkins, Doug Moe, and Roger Brown were named in an indictment in the 1962 NCAA basketball point shaving scandals involving Jack Molinas and banned from the NBA for life by then-NBA commissioner Walter Kennedy. Jackson participated in the 1968 ABA All-Star Game and holds the ABA record for free throws in a single game with 24.

== See also ==
- List of people banned or suspended by the NBA
