= Roger Kaiser =

American basketball player-coach (born 1939)

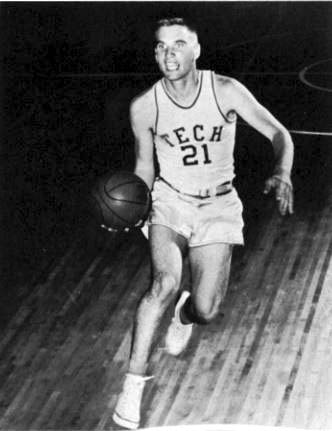
- Kaiser as a junior at Georgia Tech

Personal information
- Born: February 23, 1939 (age 87) Dale, Indiana, U.S.
- Listed height: 6 ft 2 in (1.88 m)
- Listed weight: 189 lb (86 kg)

Career information
- High school: Dale (Dale, Indiana)
- College: Georgia Tech (1958–1961)
- NBA draft: 1961: 4th round, 41st overall pick
- Drafted by: Chicago Packers
- Playing career: 1962–1963
- Position: Guard
- Number: 21
- Coaching career: 1963–1990

Career history

Playing
- 1962–1963: Washington/New York Tapers
- 1963–1964: Philadelphia Tapers

Coaching
- 1963: Philadelphia Tapers
- 1970–1990: West Georgia
- 1990–2000: Life

Career highlights
- As player: Consensus first-team All-American (1961); Consensus second-team All-American (1960); 2× First-team All-SEC (1960, 1961); No. 21 retired by Georgia Tech Yellow Jackets; As coach: 4× NAIA champion (1974, 1997, 1999, 2000)

Career ABL statistics
- Points: 2,023 (18.9 ppg)
- Rebounds: unk
- Assists: 307 (2.9 apg)
- Stats at Basketball Reference

Roger Allen Kaiser (born February 23, 1939) is an American retired basketball player and coach. Kaiser was a two-time All-American player at Georgia Tech and won four NAIA national championships as a coach at West Georgia College (now the University of West Georgia) and Life University. Kaiser was the athletic director at Mt. Bethel Christian Academy in Marietta, Georgia until his retirement in 2014.

== Playing career ==
Roger Kaiser was a 1957 Indiana All-Star player for the Dale (High School) Golden Aces of Dale, Indiana and played collegiately at Georgia Tech for head coach John "Whack" Hyder.

Roger started on the Dale High varsity for 4 seasons, leading the Golden Aces to a record of 71–24; 2 Sectional titles and 2 PAC championships. He scored a total of 1,549 points without the benefit of the 3-point shot.

Kaiser led the Southeastern Conference in scoring in both 1960 and 1961, and led the Yellow Jackets to their first NCAA tournament berth in 1960. Kaiser was named a consensus All-American in both 1960 and 1961; he was named the Southeastern Conference MVP in 1961 and was selected as an All-Southeastern Conference player in 1960 and 1961. He finished his Yellow Jacket career with 1,628 points. Kaiser also lettered in baseball at Georgia Tech.

Georgia Tech retired his number 21 in 1961 and inducted him into their Hall of Fame in 1966.

After his collegiate career was over, Kaiser played in the American Basketball League for the New York and Washington Tapers; he ranks in the Top Ten in scoring in league history. He also holds 3 of the Top Ten marks for 'points in a game' in franchise history, including a franchise record 51 point game vs. the Hawai'i Chiefs on Dec 4, 1961

=== College baseball ===
Kaiser was a two-sport star at Georgia Tech; a 3-year letterman, he was an All-Southeastern Conference outfielder in 1959; winning the Triple Crown for Georgia Tech and leading them to their first NCAA baseball Tournament. He was the team captain in 1961.

== Coaching career ==
Following the conclusion of his playing days, Kaiser spent one season as the Freshman coach at Georgia Tech before moving on to Decatur (GA) High, he began coaching at West Georgia College in 1970. His UWG Braves won the 1974 NAIA National Championship. Following 20 years at West Georgia, Kaiser was recruited to start an athletics program at Life University in Atlanta. Kaiser's teams won national championships in 1997, 1999, and 2000 and were National Finalists in 1994. Kaiser won two NAIA national coach of the year awards (1997, 2000).
