= Mark Jones (basketball, born 1961) =

American basketball player

Personal information
- Born: April 10, 1961 (age 65) Rochester, New York, U.S.
- Listed height: 6 ft 1 in (1.85 m)
- Listed weight: 175 lb (79 kg)

Career information
- High school: East (Rochester, New York)
- College: St. Bonaventure (1979–1983)
- NBA draft: 1983: 4th round, 82nd overall pick
- Drafted by: New York Knicks
- Position: Point guard
- Number: 11

Career history
- 1983: New Jersey Nets
- 1983–1984: Albany Patroons

Career highlights
- CBA champion (1984)
- Stats at NBA.com
- Stats at Basketball Reference

Mark Anthony Jones (born April 10, 1961) is an American former professional basketball player. He played point guard. Jones played college basketball for the St. Bonaventure Bonnies before being selected by the New York Knicks in the fourth round of the 1983 NBA draft with the 82nd overall pick. He never played for the Knicks and instead played six games in the NBA for the New Jersey Nets during the 1983–84 season.

== Biography ==
Jones played for four seasons at St. Bonaventure University and averaged 15.2 points per game. In 1982 he was named to the All-Eastern Athletic Association first team and the following year he made the second team, with the conference being renamed the Atlantic 10 Conference. Jones is currently the ninth leading scorer in St. Bonaventure history.

Jones was drafted by the New York Knicks as the 82nd overall pick in the 4th round of the 1983 NBA draft. He was cut from the final roster shortly before the start of the 1983–84 season. Weeks later he signed with the New Jersey Nets and he scored 7 points in six games. Jones played the rest of the season in the Continental Basketball Association (CBA), appearing in 29 games for the Albany Patroons. He averaged 10.8 points per game playing for coach Phil Jackson as the Patroons won the CBA championship.

== Career statistics ==
Legend
GP	Games played	GS	Games started	MPG	Minutes per game
FG%	Field goal percentage	3P%	3-point field goal percentage	FT%	Free throw percentage
RPG	Rebounds per game	APG	Assists per game	SPG	Steals per game
BPG	Blocks per game	PPG	Points per game	**Bold**	Career high

=== NBA ===
==== Regular season ====
Year	Team	GP	GS	MPG	FG%	3P%	FT%	RPG	APG	SPG	BPG	PPG
1983–84	New Jersey	6	0	2.7	.500	.000	.500	.3	.8	.0	.0	1.2
