= Whitey Martin =

American basketball player

Personal information
- Born: April 11, 1939 (age 87)
- Listed height: 6 ft 2 in (1.88 m)
- Listed weight: 185 lb (84 kg)

Career information
- High school: Bishop Timon (Buffalo, New York)
- College: St. Bonaventure (1958–1961)
- NBA draft: 1961: 2nd round, 10th overall pick
- Drafted by: New York Knicks
- Playing career: 1961–1962
- Position: Point guard
- Number: 7

Career history
- 1961–1962: New York Knicks

Career highlights
- No. 34 retired by St. Bonaventure Bonnies
- Stats at NBA.com
- Stats at Basketball Reference

Ronald Barry "Whitey" Martin (born April 11, 1939) is a former NBA basketball player for the New York Knicks. Martin received his nickname "Whitey," because of bleach-blond hair color. In college, Martin was mainly known as an exceptional ballhandler and defensive player. In a 1961 Sports Illustrated article, Martin was described as a "6-foot-2 sandy-haired senior with hands as quick as a nervous pickpocket." Martin was drafted with the first pick in the second round of the 1961 NBA draft. He played sixty-six games in the 1961-62 NBA season for the Knicks and averaged 3.4 points per game, 2.4 rebounds per game and 1.7 assists per game.

== Career statistics ==
Legend
GP	Games played	GS	Games started	MPG	Minutes per game
FG%	Field goal percentage	3P%	3-point field goal percentage	FT%	Free throw percentage
RPG	Rebounds per game	APG	Assists per game	SPG	Steals per game
BPG	Blocks per game	PPG	Points per game	**Bold**	Career high

=== NBA ===
==== Regular season ====
Year	Team	GP	MPG	FG%	FT%	RPG	APG	PPG
1961–62	New York	66	15.4	.325	.673	2.4	1.7	3.4
