= Dick Hickox =

American basketball player and coach

Personal information
- Born: February 15, 1938
- Died: August 18, 2006 (aged 68)
- Listed height: 5 ft 6 in (1.68 m)
- Listed weight: 165 lb (75 kg)

Career information
- High school: North Side (Fort Wayne, Indiana)
- College: Allan Hancock (1956–1957); Miami (Florida) (1958–1961)
- NBA draft: 1961: undrafted
- Position: Guard

Career history

Coaching
- 1967–1971: Miami (Florida) (assistant)

Career highlights
- Third-team All-American – AP (1960); No. 13 honored by Miami Hurricanes

Richard A. Hickox (February 15, 1938 – August 18, 2006) was an American basketball player, best known for his college career at the University of Miami (UM), where he was the school's first basketball All-American. Hickox later coached at the college and high school levels.

== High school and college ==
Hickox was a three-year starting guard at North Side High School in Fort Wayne, Indiana. Because of his size, he received little recruiting attention – gaining scholarship offers from only Western Michigan and Montana State. He opted instead for Allan Hancock College, a junior college in California. It was while at Allan Hancock that Hickox was discovered by Miami head coach Bruce Hale, who convinced him to transfer to UM.

The Hurricanes reached new success with Hickox, as the diminutive guard made All-America teams all three seasons. He was a third-team pick by the Associated Press in 1960 after leading the team to a 23–4 record and the program's first NCAA Tournament bid. In his sophomore and senior seasons, Hickox was an honorable mention pick and in all three of his seasons at UM he was named to the UPI "Little All-America" team – which showcased players under 5 feet, 10 inches in height.

For his three-year Miami career, Hickox scored 1,529 points, averaging 19.4 points per game. He is a member of the University of Miami Athletic Hall of Fame and the Indiana Basketball Hall of Fame.

== Coaching career ==
After the close of his college career, Hickox was drafted by the Kansas City Steers of the American Basketball League. However, he never played for the team as he was drafted into the United States Army prior to the start of the 1961–62 season. After his military stint, he returned to the University of Miami as the freshman basketball coach, then spent some time as a physical education teacher in his native Fort Wayne. When his former UM teammate Ron Godfrey was named head coach in 1967, Hickox was brought in as the team's assistant coach until the school abolished its basketball program in 1971. Hickox spent many years coaching four different high school teams in the Miami area.

Hickox died on August 18, 2006, following esophageal and colon cancer.
