= Olean Armory =

- U.S. National Register of Historic Places
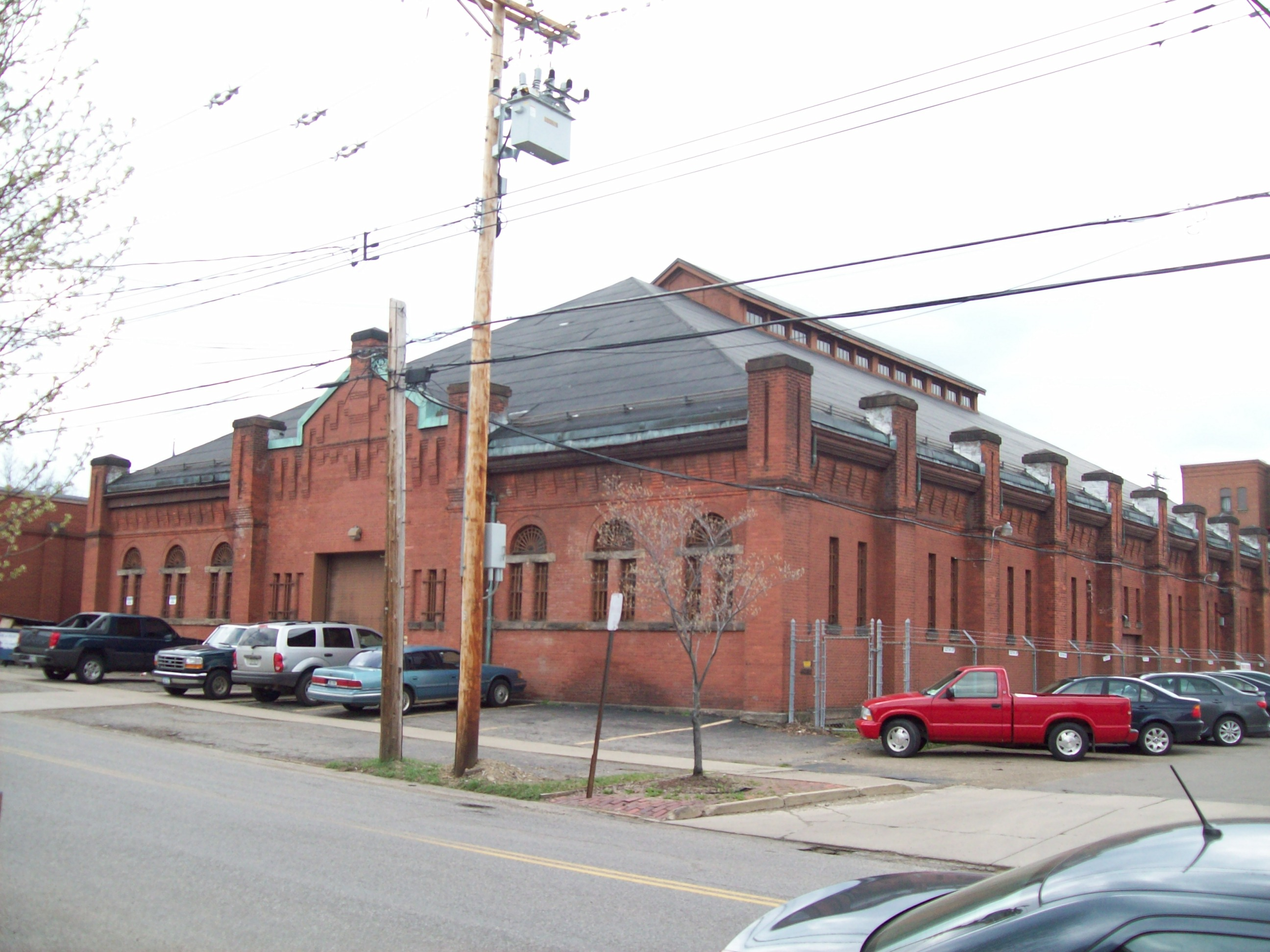
- Olean Armory, April 2010

- Location within New York Location within the United States
- Location: 119 Times Sq., Olean, New York
- Coordinates: 42°4′41″N 78°25′43″W
- Built: 1890
- Architect: Isaac Perry, Lewis Pilcher
- Architectural style: Late Victorian, Tudor Revival, castellated
- MPS: Army National Guard Armories in New York State MPS
- NRHP reference No.: 95000080
- Added to NRHP: March 2, 1995

Olean Armory is a historic armory building located at Olean in Cattaraugus County, New York. It was designed by State architects Isaac G. Perry (1890 structure) and Lewis Pilcher (1919 structure). It consists of a two-story, Tudor inspired administration building constructed in 1919, with an attached Romanesque drill shed constructed in 1890. The building features a number of castellated style features such as turrets and buttresses.

From 1946 to 1966, the Armory served as the home arena for the St. Bonaventure University basketball squad. The squad won 99 consecutive home games at the armory before their streak was broken in 1961. In its basketball configuration, the Armory held 2,200 spectators and was noted for its extreme intimate atmosphere (the front row was inches away from the court), poor lighting and ugly aesthetics, with Sports Illustrated describing the armory as an "architectural monstrosity."

It was listed on the National Register of Historic Places in 1995.
