= St. Bonaventure Bonnies men's basketball =

College basketball team in New York, US

| 2026–27 St. Bonaventure Bonnies men's basketball team |
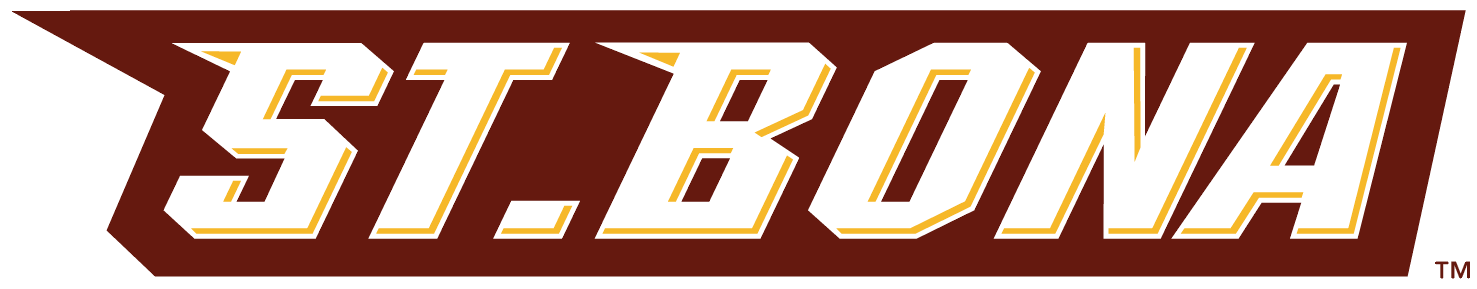
- University: St. Bonaventure University
- Athletic director: Bob Beretta
- Head coach: Mike MacDonald (1st season)
- Location: Allegany, New York
- Arena: Reilly Center (capacity: 8,257)
- Conference: Atlantic 10
- Nickname: Bonnies
- Colors: Brown and white
- Student section: Wolf Pack
- All-time record: 1420–1064 (.570)

NCAA Division I tournament Final Four
- 1970
Other NCAA Division I tournament results
| Elite Eight | 1970 |
| Sweet Sixteen | 1961, 1968, 1970 |
| Appearances | 1961, 1968, 1970, 1978, 2000, 2012, 2018, 2021 |

NIT champions
- 1977

Conference tournament champions
- 2012, 2021

Conference regular-season champions
- 2016, 2021; WNY3: 1950, 1951, 1957, 1958

Uniforms
| Home | Away | Alternate |

The St. Bonaventure Bonnies men's basketball (formerly the St. Bonaventure Brown Indians) team is the college basketball team that represents St. Bonaventure University, located near the city of Olean, New York. The school's team currently competes in the Atlantic 10 Conference and plays its home games at the Reilly Center. The Bonnies are currently coached by Mike MacDonald.

== History ==
=== Beginnings ===
Of the major sports at St. Bonaventure, basketball was the last introduced. In 1902, the first team had been put together, mainly consisting of former football players. The coach of this team was university professor Patric Driscoll. Official records of these games were not kept. Proper facilities were not available until four years later when intramural games began to be played in a handball court on campus.

In 1916, Butler Gym was constructed, but wasn't finished by the time the intercollegiate team played its first game against University at Buffalo. This game was played in the Olean Armory. Games were cancelled until after World War I had ended. The first game played in Butler Gym was during the 1919-1920 season with Richard Phelan as the coach. Basketball prospered on campus in the decades between World War I and World War II. From 1942 to 1944, basketball was again put on hold for a world war. Following World War II, Anslem Kreiger, a former All-American Basketball player, took over the program, with a record of 15-10 over his two-year tenure. The Brown Indians returned to the Olean Armory after the war and remained there for the next 20 seasons. The team was noted for having won 99 consecutive home games at the Armory before that streak was broken in February 1961.

Ed (Melvin) Milkovich took over the basketball team for a six-year period starting with the 1948–49 season, after Kreiger was promoted to athletic director. This was a period of great success for the program, with two appearances in the National Invitational Tournament (NIT), the first during the 1950–51 season when the team was eliminated in the second round. Further success came with the team's appearance in the 1952 NIT, where they made it to the semifinals. Over his tenure, Milkovich led the team to a record of 98–47.

Edward Donovan took over head coaching duties for the 1953–54 season, holding the position for an eight-year period. The team again made an appearance in the NIT in 1957, again making it to the semifinals

=== Golden era ===
Under Donovan, the team made it to the NIT every year from 1957 to 1960. In 1961, the team made its first trip to the NCAA tournament and finished third in its regional. However, this was Donovan's final season coaching the Brown Indians; in May 1961 he took a job as a coach of the New York Knicks.

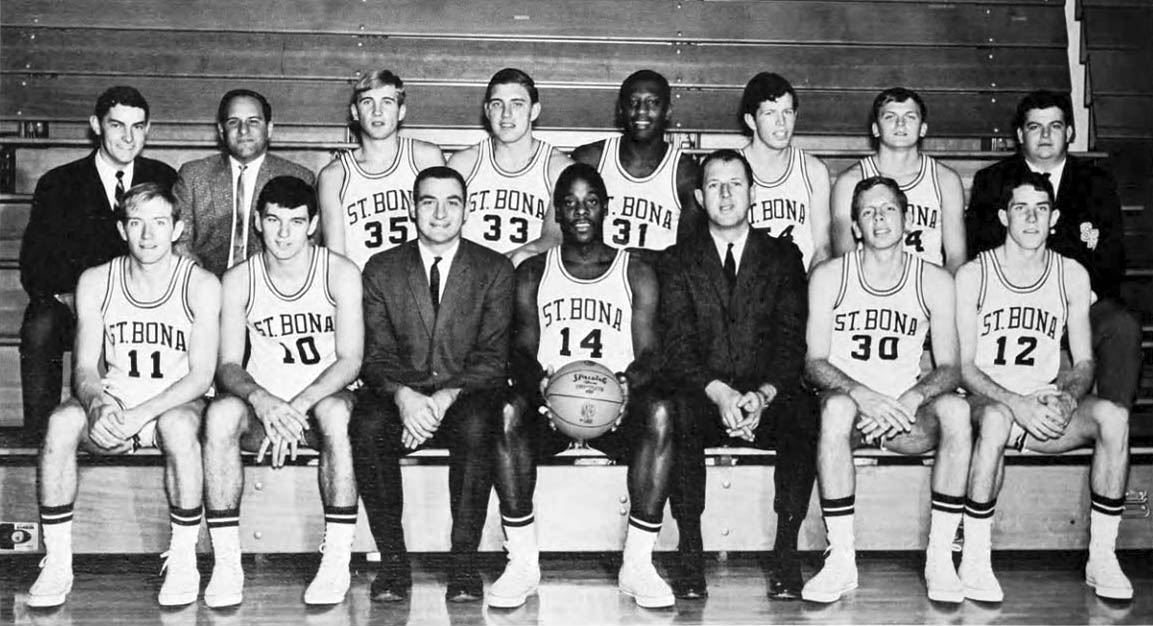
The 1967-68 team. Bob Lanier has #31

Former Brown Indian Larry Weise took over the team starting with the 1961–62 season. In 1964, Weise led the team to the NCIT Tournament and the NIT. Under Weise's tutelage, the team returned to the NCAA tournament in 1968, proceeding to the second round prior to being eliminated. In 1970, St. Bonaventure, led by future NBA-great Bob Lanier, was thought to have a legitimate shot at unseating UCLA for the national title. However, they lost Lanier late in their East regional final victory over Villanova to a torn ligament, causing the All-American to miss the Final Four. St. Bonaventure was upset by Jacksonville in the national semifinals, before losing to New Mexico State in the national consolation game. In each Final Four game, the Lanier-less Bonnies were dominated by the opponent's pivot, Artis Gilmore for Jacksonville and Sam Lacey for New Mexico State.

Weise led the team to another trip to the NIT in 1971. In 1973, he relinquished his post as coach. He was replaced by Jim Satalin, another former Brown Indian. He led the team to a championship in the NIT in 1977. The next year, the team again made it to the NCAA tournament and was defeated in the first round. In 1979, St. Bonaventure joined the Eastern Athletic Association (informally known as the "Eastern 8," and renamed the Atlantic 10 Conference in 1982) and the Brown Indians made another appearance at the NIT and again were defeated in the first round. The team was renamed the Bonnies in 1992.

=== Rebounding ===
In the 1999–2000 season, the Bonnies finished in second place in A-10 play under coach Jim Baron and lost to #6 ranked Temple in the A-10 tournament championship. The Bonnies received an at-large bid to the NCAA tournament, their first bid since 1978. However, they failed to advance, losing to #19 ranked Kentucky in double overtime in the first round. After the following season Baron moved on to coach fellow A-10 school, Rhode Island.

=== 2003 scandal ===
Jan van Breda Kolff was hired to continue the success Baron had achieved. However his tenure ended after only two seasons due to an off-court scandal. The 2002–03 men's basketball season led to controversy after it emerged that a junior college transfer student, Jamil Terrell, was permitted to play even though he had not completed his associate degree, and was therefore ineligible for one year. The team was forced to forfeit every game in which he played and was barred from the A-10 Tournament. In protest, players voted to sit out the last two games of the regular season. Head coach Jan van Breda Kolff, athletic director Gothard Lane, and school president Dr. Robert Wickenheiser were all ousted. St. Bonaventure's chairman of the board of trustees, William Swan, took his own life in August 2003, feeling that he had let down his alma mater by failing to prevent the scandal.

St. Bonaventure docked itself three scholarships from 2003 to 2005 and the NCAA subsequently put the team on three years' probation and banned it from postseason play in 2003–04. Subsequently, the Bonnies failed to achieve a winning record until the 2010–11 season under coach Mark Schmidt.

=== Renewed success ===
In the 2011–12 season, the team enjoyed more success than in any season since the 2003 scandal. Led by conference Player of the Year Andrew Nicholson — the 19th pick by Orlando in the 2012 NBA draft — they accumulated a 20–12 record during the regular season. They then won the school's first-ever Atlantic 10 tournament title, beating Saint Joseph's, UMass, and Xavier. The conference title earned them an automatic bid to the NCAA tournament, where they lost 66–63 to ACC champion Florida State in the second round at Bridgestone Arena in Nashville, Tennessee.

After Nicholson departed for the NBA, the 2012–13 team failed to qualify for the 2013 A-10 tournament in Brooklyn. However, the 2013–14 Bonnies qualified for the A-10 tournament, advancing to the semifinals. They upset the #1 seed Saint Louis on a buzzer-beater shot by Jordan Gathers, the nephew of Hank Gathers. That play made the SportsCenter Top 10 plays of the Night. In the 2014–15 campaign, the Bonnies had a winning record and advanced to the quarterfinals of the A-10 Conference tournament. On February 7, 2015, Bonnies guard Marcus Posley hit a buzzer beater shot to upset the nationally ranked VCU Rams and Shaka Smart at the nearly sold-out Reilly Center. The students, and many fans, rushed the court to celebrate after Posley's shot went in.

The 2015–16 Bonnies finished in a three-way tie for first place in the A-10 regular season. The Bonnies were upset in their first game of the A-10 tournament, losing in overtime to Davidson. The Bonnies failed to receive a bid to the NCAA tournament and were considered one of the "first four out" by the selection committee, their poor non-conference strength of schedule and lack of non-conference quality wins being listed as the reasons they were not selected for a bid. Their omission was widely considered to be one of the largest snubs of the year, if not all time, being the first team to ever to have an RPI ranking in the top 30 and a conference regular season title to their name, and not receive a bid. It came as such a surprise to so many in the college basketball world, that it prompted the Atlantic 10 athletic director to issue a public statement voicing her dissatisfaction with the committee's decision to exclude the Bonnies. The following year, St. Bonaventure alum Brian Toolan wrote a short book about the Bonnies' 2015-2016 season, entitled "Snubbed".

The 2017-18 Bonnies tied the school's season record at 25 wins, a record previously set by the 1969-1970 Final Four team. The 25-win season resulted in an at-large bid in the NCAA tournament as an 11-seed, where the Bonnies went on to beat the UCLA Bruins 65-58 for their first NCAA tournament win since 1970. The 2017-2018 season marked the Bonnies' seventh NCAA tournament appearance in program history and the second under head coach Mark Schmidt. The Bonnies later lost to the Florida Gators 62-77 in the 1st round of the NCAA tournament.

On February 27, 2021 the Bonnies clinched the first ever outright Atlantic 10 regular season title in program history when Davidson defeated VCU 65-57. The successful season continued two weeks later when, on March 14, 2021, the Bonnies won their first A-10 tournament title since 2012, beating VCU 74-65. With this win the Bonnies secured an automatic bid to the NCAA tournament, their second in 4 years.

The 2021–22 Bonnies opened the new campaign ranked in the AP Poll for the first time in a half century. Following a win in the Charleston Classic (in which the Bonnies defeated Boise State, Clemson and Marquette) the Bonnies reached as high as 16th in the national poll. The Bonnies went unranked the rest of the season following a loss to Northern Iowa in their first game after the Charleston Classic win. Following an ankle injury to their star Point Guard Kyle Lofton, the Bonnies fell to AP ranked UCONN and were blown out against Virginia Tech in Lofton's return to play. Following that loss to VA Tech. the Bonnies went on a one-month COVID pause due to positive cases within their program and their opponents. The A-10 preseason favorite Bonnies finished the regular season as the 4th seed for the A-10 tournament, losing to 5th seeded Saint Louis in the quarterfinals after Lofton missed 2 free throws trailing by 1 point with under 2 seconds remaining.

The Bonnies returned to National Invitational Tournament (NIT) after missing out on an NCAA tournament berth. They defeated Colorado, Oklahoma and Virginia en route to an appearance at Madison Square Garden for the NIT semifinals versus Xavier. The Bonnies fell in that game to finish their season. Following the loss, the "ironman 5 2.0" as they were called composed of Kyle Lofton, Dominick Welch, Jaren Holmes, Jalen Adaway and Osun Osunniyi all opted to take their talents elsewhere. Adaway entered the NBA draft, Lofton transferred to Florida, Holmes and Osunniyi transferred to Iowa State, and Welch transferred to Alabama.

On September 18, 2024, former ESPN journalist Adrian Wojnarowski, a 1991 graduate of the school, was announced as the program's general manager.

== Seasons ==
Record table
| Season | Team | Overall | Conference | Standing | Postseason |
|---|---|---|---|---|---|
St. Bonaventure Bonnies men's basketball (Atlantic 10 Conference) (1994–present)
| 1994–95 | St. Bonaventure | 18–13 | 9–7 | 4th | NIT |
| 1995–96 | St. Bonaventure | 10–18 | 4–12 | 5th | |
| 1996–97 | St. Bonaventure | 14–14 | 5–11 | 5th | |
| 1997–98 | St. Bonaventure | 17–15 | 6–10 | 4th | NIT |
| 1998–99 | St. Bonaventure | 14–15 | 8–8 | 4th | |
| 1999–00 | St. Bonaventure | 21–10 | 11–5 | 2nd | NCAA Tournament |
| 2000–01 | St. Bonaventure | 18–12 | 9–7 | 5th | NIT |
| 2001–02 | St. Bonaventure | 17–13 | 8–8 | 3rd | NIT |
| 2002–03 | St. Bonaventure | 13–14 | 7–9 | 6th | |
| 2003–04 | St. Bonaventure | 7–21 | 3–13 | 5th | |
| 2004–05 | St. Bonaventure | 2–26 | 1–15 | 6th | |
| 2005–06 | St. Bonaventure | 8–19 | 2–14 | 13th | |
| 2006–07 | St. Bonaventure | 7–22 | 4–12 | 12th | |
| 2007–08 | St. Bonaventure | 8–22 | 2–14 | 14th | |
| 2008–09 | St. Bonaventure | 15–15 | 6–10 | 11th | |
| 2009–10 | St. Bonaventure | 15–16 | 7–9 | 8th | |
| 2010–11 | St. Bonaventure | 16–15 | 8–8 | 7th | CBI Tournament |
| 2011–12 | St. Bonaventure | 20–12 | 10–6 | 3rd | NCAA Tournament |
| 2012–13 | St. Bonaventure | 14–15 | 7–9 | 11th | |
| 2013–14 | St. Bonaventure | 18–15 | 6–10 | 9th | |
| 2014–15 | St. Bonaventure | 18–13 | 10–8 | 6th | |
| 2015–16 | St. Bonaventure | 22–9 | 14–4 | 1st | NIT |
| 2016–17 | St. Bonaventure | 20–12 | 11–7 | 5th | |
| 2017–18 | St. Bonaventure | 26–8 | 14–4 | 2nd | NCAA Tournament |
| 2018–19 | St. Bonaventure | 18–16 | 12–6 | 4th | |
| 2019–20 | St. Bonaventure | 19–12 | 11–7 | 5th | Tournaments canceled due to COVID-19 |
| 2020–21 | St. Bonaventure | 16–4 | 11–4 | 1st | NCAA Tournament |
| 2021–22 | St. Bonaventure | 23–10 | 12–5 | 4th | NIT |
| 2022–23 | St. Bonaventure | 14-18 | 8-10 | 8th | |
| 2023–24 | St. Bonaventure | 20-13 | 9-9 | 7th | |
| St. Bonaventure Bonnies: | | 1454-1096 (.570) | 632–662 (.488) | | |
| Total: | | 14254-1096 (.570) | | | |
National champion Postseason invitational champion Conference regular season champion Conference regular season and conference tournament champion Division regular season champion Division regular season and conference tournament champion Conference tournament champion

== Postseason ==
=== NCAA Division I tournament results ===
The Bonnies have appeared in eight NCAA Tournaments. Their combined record is 7–10.

| Year | Round | Opponent | Result |
|---|---|---|---|
| 1961 | First round Sweet Sixteen; Regional third-place game | Rhode Island; Wake Forest; Princeton | W 86–76; L 73–78; W 85–67 |
| 1968 | First round Sweet Sixteen; Regional third-place game | Boston College; North Carolina; Columbia | W 102–93; L 72–91; L 75–95 |
| 1970 | First round Sweet Sixteen; Elite Eight; Final Four; National third-place game | Davidson; North Carolina State; Villanova; Jacksonville; New Mexico State | W 85–72; W 80–68; W 97–74; L 83–91; L 73–79 |
| 1978 | First round | Pennsylvania | L 83–92 |
| 2000 | First round | Kentucky | L 80–85 ^{OT} |
| 2012 | Second round | Florida State | L 63–66 |
| 2018 | First Four; First round | UCLA; Florida | W 65–58; L 62–77 |
| 2021 | First round | LSU | L 61–76 |

=== NCAA tournament seeding history ===
The NCAA began seeding the tournament with the 1979 edition.

| Year | '00 | '12 | '18 | '21 |
|---|---|---|---|---|
| Seed | 12 | 14 | 11 | 9 |

=== NIT results ===
The Bonnies have appeared in 18 National Invitation Tournaments. Their combined record is 21–19. They were NIT champions in 1977, and were the tournament's top overall seed in 2016.

| Year | Round | Opponent | Result |
|---|---|---|---|
| 1951 | First round Quarterfinals | Cincinnati; St. John's | W 70–67; L 58–60 |
| 1952 | Quarterfinals; Semifinals; Third-place game | Western Kentucky; Dayton; Duquesne | W 70–69; L 62–69; W 48–34 |
| 1957 | First round Quarterfinals; Semifinals; Third-place game | Cincinnati; Seattle; Memphis; Temple | W 90–72; W 85–68; L 78–80; L 50–67 |
| 1958 | Quarterfinals; Semifinals; Third-place game | St. Joseph's; Xavier; St. John's | W 79–75; L 53–72; W 84–69 |
| 1959 | First round Quarterfinals | Villanova; St. John's | W 75–67; L 74–82 |
| 1960 | First round Quarterfinals; Semifinals; Third-place game | Holy Cross; St. John's; Bradley; Utah State | W 94–81; W 106–71; L 71–82; L 83–99 |
| 1964 | First round | Army | L 62–64 |
| 1971 | First round Quarterfinals; Semifinals; Third-place game | Purdue; Hawaiʻi; Georgia Tech; Duke | W 94–79; W 73–64; L 71–76; W 92–88 |
| 1977 | First round Quarterfinals; Semifinals; Championship Game | Rutgers; Oregon; Villanova; Houston | W 79–77; W 76–73; W 86–82; W 94–91 |
| 1979 | First round | Alabama | L 89–98 |
| 1983 | First round | Iona | L 76–90 |
| 1995 | First round Second round | Southern Miss; Marquette | W 75–70; L 61–70 |
| 1998 | First round | Vanderbilt | L 61–73 |
| 2001 | First round | Pittsburgh | L 75–84 |
| 2002 | First round | Syracuse | L 66–76 |
| 2016 | First round | Wagner | L 75–79 |
| 2022 | First round Second round Quarterfinals; Semifinals | Colorado; Oklahoma; Virginia; Xavier | W 76–68; W 70–68; W 52–51; L 77–84 |
| 2025 | First round | Kent State | L 56–75 |

=== CBI results ===
The Bonnies have appeared in one College Basketball Invitational. Their record is 0–1.

| Year | Round | Opponent | Result |
|---|---|---|---|
| 2011 | First round | UCF | L 54–69 |

In accordance with school policy, since 2014, the team has declined all postseason tournament invitations other than the NCAA tournament and NIT. In 2024, the school reportedly declined an NIT invitation, one of 17 schools, and the only mid-major to do so that year. It reversed that decision for 2025 and accepted their invitation to that tournament.

== National polls ==
St. Bonaventure has finished in the Final Top 25 rankings 6 times in the AP Poll.

St. Bonaventure Final Rankings

| Year | Record | AP Poll† |
|---|---|---|
| 1952 | 21–6 | 15 |
| 1959 | 20–3 | 19 |
| 1960 | 21–5 | 9 |
| 1961 | 24–4 | 3 |
| 1968 | 23–2 | 3 |
| 1970 | 25–3 | 3 |

† The Associated Press began compiling a ranking of the top 20 college men's basketball teams during the 1948–1949 season. It has issued the poll continuously since the 1950–1951 season. Beginning with the 1989-1990 season, the poll expanded to 25 teams.

== Notable players and coaches ==
=== Coaches with NCAA Tournament appearances ===
| Coach | Years | Win–loss | Win % | Final Four | NCAA appearances |
|---|---|---|---|---|---|
| Eddie Donovan | 1954–1961 | 139–57 | .550 | 0 | 1 |
| Larry Weise | 1962–1973 | 202–90 | .692 | 1 | 2 |
| Jim Satalin | 1974–1982 | 155-93 | .625 | 0 | 1 |
| Jim Baron | 1993–2001 | 132–131 | .502 | 0 | 1 |
| Mark Schmidt | 2007–pres | 268–194† | .580 | 0 | 3 |

† - As of March 25, 2022

=== All-Americans ===
St. Bonaventure has had 11 All-Americans in its history.

| Player | Count | Years |
|---|---|---|
| Ken Murray | 1 | 1950 AP Honorable Mention |
| Bob Sassone | 1 | 1952 AP Honorable Mention |
| Tom Stith | 3 | 1959 AP Honorable Mention 1960 First Team, 1961 First Team |
| Freddie Crawford | 2 | 1961 AP Honorable Mention, 1964 AP Honorable Mention |
| Whitey Martin | 1 | 1961 AP Honorable Mention |
| Bob Lanier | 3 | 1968 Second Team, 1969 AP Second Team, 1970 First Team |
| Greg Sanders | 1 | 1978 AP Honorable Mention |
| Earl Belcher | 2 | 1980 AP Honorable Mention, 1981 AP Honorable Mention |
| Mark Jones | 2 | 1982 AP Honorable Mention, 1983 AP Honorable Mention |
| Andrew Nicholson | 1 | 2012 AP Honorable Mention |
| Jaylen Adams | 1 | 2018 AP Honorable Mention |

=== Retired numbers ===
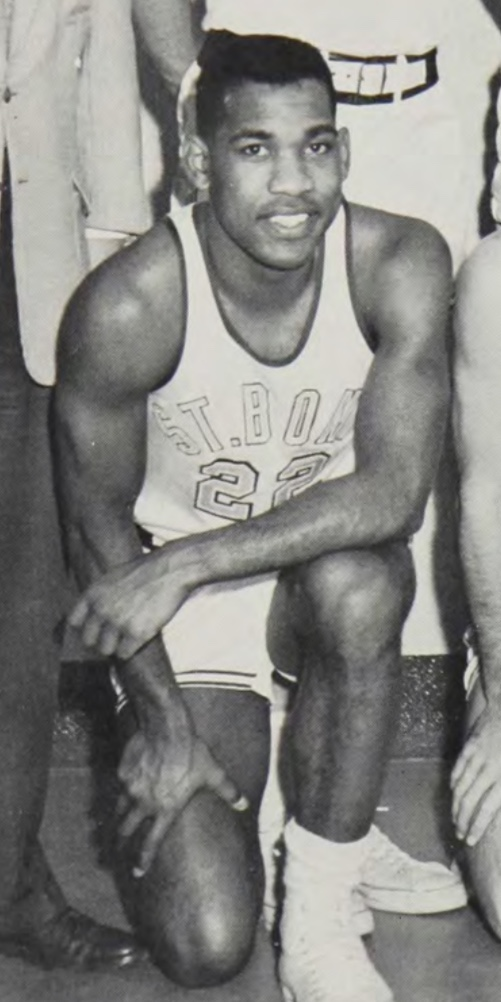
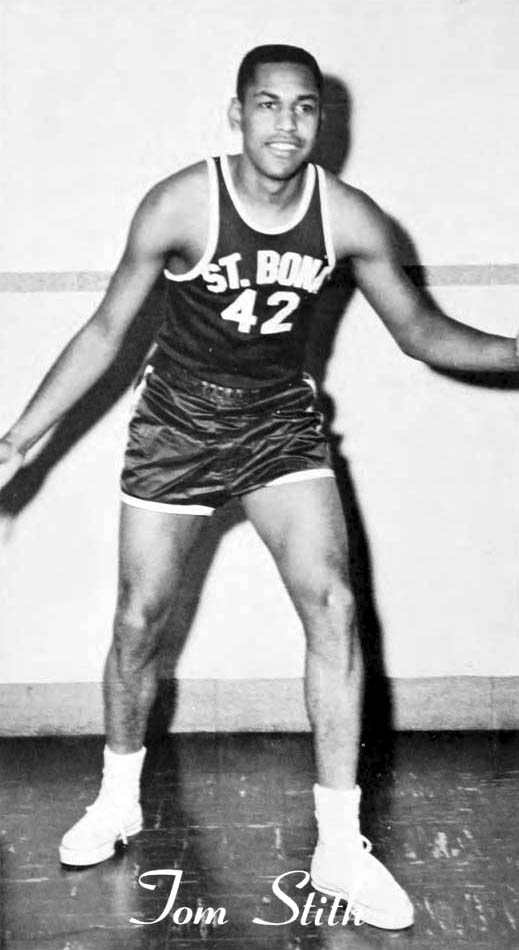
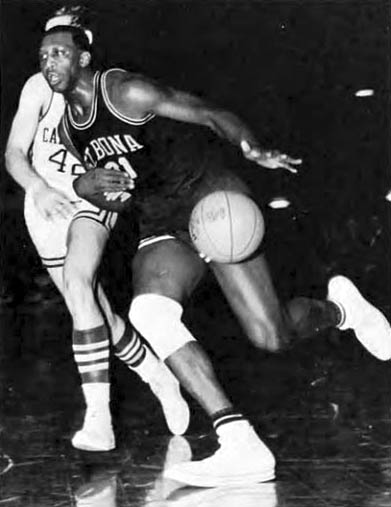
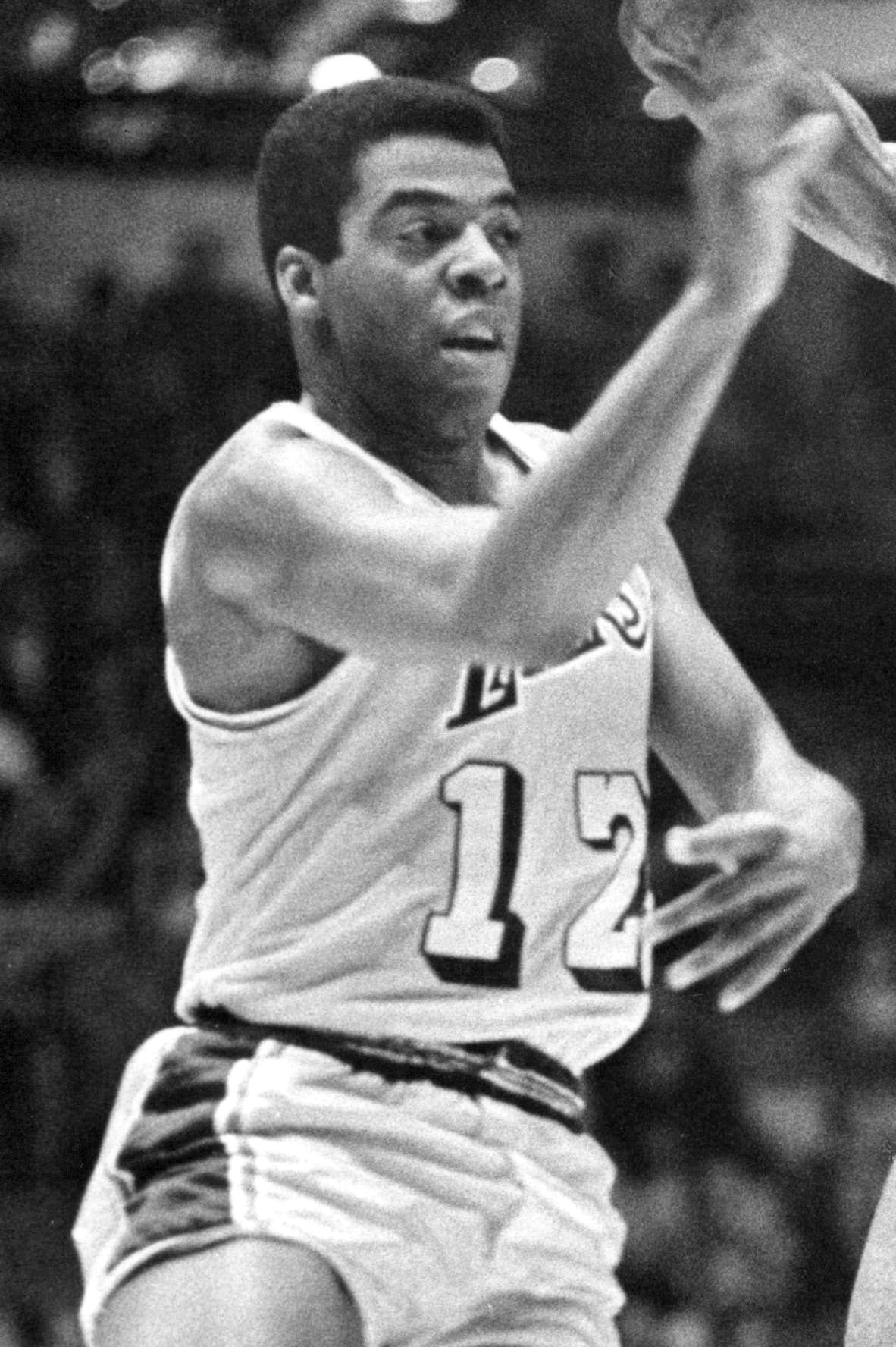
Fltr (above): Sam Stith, Tom Stith; (below) Bob Lanier, and Freddie Crawford, some of the players whose numbers were retired

St. Bonaventure Bonnies retired numbers
| No. | Player | Position | Career | No. ret. | Ref. |
| 13 | Ken Murray | G | 1946–1950 | 1969 | |
| 14 | Bill Butler | F | 1964–1968 | 1969 | |
| 22 | Sam Stith | G | 1957–1960 | 1969 | |
| 25 | Earl Belcher | F | 1977–1981 | 1991 | |
| 25 | Essie Hollis | F | 1973–1977 | 1988 | |
| 31 | Bob Lanier | C | 1967–1970 | 1975 | |
| 34 | Roland Martin | PG | 1958–1961 | 1969 | |
| 42 | Tom Stith | F | 1958–1961 | 1969 | |
| 44 | Andrew Nicholson | F | 2008–2012 | Feb 22, 2014 | |
| 53 | Greg Sanders | F | 1974–1978 | Dec 3, 2016 | |
| 54 | Freddie Crawford | G | 1960–1964 | 1970 | |

=== Basketball Hall of Fame inductees ===
| Name | Pos. | Years | Inducted |
|---|---|---|---|
| Bob Lanier | F | 1967-1970 | 1992 |

=== Bonnies in the NBA ===
St. Bonaventure has had 17 former players who have gone on to play in the NBA.

| Name | Years in NBA |
|---|---|
| Ken Murray | 1951-1955 |
| Billy Kenville | 1954-1960 |
| Fred Diute | 1955 |
| Brendan McCann | 1958-1960 |
| Sam Stith | 1962 |
| Whitey Martin | 1962 |
| Tom Stith | 1963 |
| Freddie Crawford | 1967-1971 |
| George Carter | 1968-1976 |
| Bob Lanier | 1971-1984 |
| Essie Hollis | 1979 |
| Glenn Hagan | 1982 |
| Mark Jones | 1982 |
| David Vanterpool | 2001 |
| J.R. Bremer | 2003-2004 |
| Andrew Nicholson | 2013-2017 |
| Jaylen Adams | 2019-2021 |

=== Bonnies in the Olympics ===
| Name | Year | City | Position | Country | Medal |
|---|---|---|---|---|---|
| Barry Mungar | 1988 | Seoul | Forward | Canada | |
| Norman Clarke | 1988 | Seoul | Guard | Canada | |

== SBU wins vs. the AP Top 25 ==
Since the 1993–94 season, SBU has played a total of 48 games against teams ranked in the AP Top 25 Poll. SBU has a record of 11–37 against such teams. They have a record of 0–8 against teams in the Top 5 during this span. The Bonnies also hold a record of 9–9 against ranked teams at the Reilly Center since 1993.

| Year | Opponent | Result | Site |
|---|---|---|---|
| 1950–51 | #19 Siena #15 Villanova #17 Cincinnati | W 47–45; W 74–69; W 70–67 | Home; Away; Neutral |
| 1951–52 | #11 Western Kentucky #18 Siena #4 Duquesne | W 73–60; W 69–44; W 49–31 | Home; Home; Neutral |
| 1955–56 | #16 Memphis | W 79–67 | Home |
| 1956–57 | #14 Canisus #5 Seattle | W 57–48; W 85–65 | Home; Neutral |
| 1959–60 | #14 Providence #9 Villanova | W 90–89; W 72–70 | Home; Away |
| 1960–61 | #3 Bradley | W 75–61 | Home |
| 1968–69 | #18 Marquette | W 84–62 | Home |
| 1969–70 | #17 Purdue #10 Davidson #10 NC State | W 91–75; W 85–72; W 80–68 | Neutral; Neutral; Neutral |
| 1971–72 | #12 Providence | W 98–82 | Home |
| 1977–78 | #17 Syracuse | W 91–84 | Home |
| 1977–78 | #16 Providence #14 Syracuse | W 72–64; W 70–69 | Home; Neutral |
| 1993–94 | #23 George Washington #19 West Virginia | W 71–67; W 72–66 | Home; Home |
| 1997–98 | #13 Xavier #20 Rhode Island #20 Massachusetts | W 80–77; W 86–81; W 72–70 | Home; Home; Home |
| 1999–00 | #23 Temple | W 57–56 | Home |
| 2013–14 | #21 Massachusetts #18 St. Louis | W 78–65; W 71–68 | Home; Neutral |
| 2014–15 | #18 VCU | W 73–71 | Home |
| 2015–16 | #15 Dayton | W 79–72 | Away |
| 2017–18 | #16 Rhode Island | W 77–74 | Home |

== Broadcasting ==
FM 95.7 in Olean signed on in 1949 and carried the St. Bonaventure men's basketball team from its sign-on through the next 74 seasons. In July 2023, the university announced that it was unable to come to an agreement with the station's current owners to continue broadcasting the games. For the 2023–24 season, the Bonnies broadcast their home games exclusively online. The university retained Gary Nease, their play-by-play broadcaster since 1995, to helm the play-by-play broadcast. Chris Russell, former station manager at FM 105.9 in Little Valley (where he formerly broadcast the women's basketball team), served as producer of the broadcasts. Nease explained that "I was getting it from both my company and Bonaventure that they weren't happy with some of the things that were going on (...) Bonaventure was doing a good job recruiting corporate sponsors. I think our station and Bonaventure were competing directly against each other for the advertising dollars that we needed to cover our costs and turn a profit."

After one season of carrying the games exclusively online, in which the broadcasts drew fewer than 1,500 listeners per game, St. Bonaventure signed an agreement with WBRR (FM 100.1) in Bradford, Pennsylvania to carry the team's men's basketball broadcasts beginning in fall 2024, with all staff carrying over. The university also signed an agreement with YES Network to televise five games, with streaming rights to those games held by the "Gotham Sports App" joint venture between YES and MSG Networks. In 2025, the university added WKSN in Jamestown, WLEA in Hornell and WYSL in Avon as affiliates.

== Roc City Hoops Classic ==
Formerly known as the Lightower Conference Classic, the Roc City Hoops Classic is an annual collegiate men's basketball event. The event formerly featured a game played between two Atlantic 10 Conference NCAA Division-I member schools at Blue Cross Arena.

The event, started by St. Bonaventure University, brings NCAA Division-I basketball to Rochester, New York, the largest city in the United States of America without a full NCAA Division-I member school in basketball. While the early contests featured non-conference games, often with power conference teams, in 2014, with the rise of Atlantic 10 Conference's success in the NCAA National Tournament, the event moved to feature a conference matchup for the Bonnies men's basketball program.

Alesco Advisors is the presenting Sponsor for the event. Lightower Fiber Networks (formerly Fibertech), a Boxborough, MA based provider of fiber networks has held the title sponsorship from 2002-2016.

=== Classic history ===
| Date | Score | | | | Bonnies Record | Attendance | Notes |
| November 25, 2000 | St. Bonaventure | 79 | 78 | Charlotte | 1-0 | 6,678 | Winning basket in final seconds |
| November 30, 2002 | St. Bonaventure | 54 | 56 | Saint Louis | 1-1 | 6,575 | |
| December 3, 2003 | St. Bonaventure | 78 | 87 | #16 Syracuse | 1-2 | 11,650 | Blue Cross Attendance Record |
| November 30, 2005 | St. Bonaventure | 61 | 66 | West Virginia | 1-3 | 5,162 | |
| November 17, 2009 | St. Bonaventure | 68 | 69 | St. John's | 1-4 | 4,181 | Winning basket in final seconds |
| December 23, 2010 | St. Bonaventure | 68 | 76 | Virginia Tech | 1-5 | 5,285 | Overtime |
| December 20, 2011 | St. Bonaventure | 65 | 67 | #16 NC State | 1-6 | 5,802 | |
| November 24, 2012 | St. Bonaventure | 80 | 75 | Niagara | 2-6 | 4,758 | |
| January 14, 2015 | St. Bonaventure | 75 | 55 | George Mason | 3-6 | 4,032 | Start of A-10 series |
| March 2, 2016 | St. Bonaventure | 98 | 90 | Saint Joseph's | 4-6 | 6,734 | Posley scores D1 High 47 points |
| January 14, 2017 | St. Bonaventure | 73 | 53 | Fordham | 5-6 | 6,386 | National Broadcast on NBCSN |
| December 16, 2017 | St. Bonaventure | 81 | 79 | Vermont | 6-6 | 5,828 | Winning basket in final seconds |
| January 12, 2019 | St. Bonaventure | 71 | 64 | Fordham | 7-6 | 4,914 | |
| January 15, 2020 | St. Bonaventure | 74 | 61 | UMass | 8-6 | 4,276 | |
