= Earl Belcher =

American jazz musician (born 1958)

Personal information
- Born: December 15, 1958 (age 67) Queens, New York, U.S.
- Listed height: 6 ft 6 in (1.98 m)

Career information
- High school: Christian Brothers Academy (DeWitt, New York)
- College: St. Bonaventure (1977–1981)
- NBA draft: 1981: 4th round, 87th overall pick
- Drafted by: San Antonio Spurs
- Position: Forward

Career highlights
- 2× Eastern 8 Player of the Year (1980, 1981); No. 25 retired by St. Bonaventure Bonnies
- Stats at Basketball Reference

Earl V. Belcher Jr. (born December 15, 1958) is a retired American basketball player who is best known for his collegiate career at St. Bonaventure University between 1977–78 and 1980–81. While playing for the Bonnies, Belcher scored 2,077 points, averaged 20 points per game for his career, and was twice named the Eastern 8 Men's Basketball Player of the Year (the Eastern 8 is now known as the Atlantic 10 Conference).

== Early life ==
Born in Queens, Belcher moved upstate to Syracuse at age six when his father had to relocate while working for General Motors. He played many sports as a youth, including basketball, golf, tennis, baseball, football and hockey. As Belcher got older, he began to grow quickly. He claims to have grown from 5'6" to 6'1" in seventh grade, to 6'3" in eighth grade and then 6'6" by his senior year in high school at Christian Brothers Academy. The reason he focused on basketball, he later explained, was because "Basketball was a given in my neighborhood if you were that tall, so I went with the flow and played." Belcher became an All-American player in high school and then decided to continue his career at St. Bonaventure University.

== College career ==
Belcher's collegiate career began in 1977–78. A forward, he averaged 7.3 points and 3.9 rebounds per game during his freshman season. St. Bonaventure earned a berth into the 1978 NCAA Tournament but lost in the round of 32 to Penn. They finished their season with a 21–8 overall record. The following year, Belcher increased his averages to 21.5 points and 6.6 rebounds per game while leading the team in points for the first of three consecutive seasons. Behind a 19–8 record, the Bonnies earned their way into the 1979 National Invitation Tournament. They lost in the first round to Alabama, however, thus ending their season with a 19–9 record.

In 1979–80, his junior year, Belcher led the Eastern Athletic Association, popularly known as the Eastern 8, in scoring with a 26.9 points per game average. He also recorded 7.3 rebounds per game, and even though St. Bonaventure finished in sixth place in the conference with a 16–11 record, Belcher was chosen as the conference player of the year. He was also selected to the Eastern 8 All-Conference First Team. In Belcher's final season he repeated as both a First Team and conference player of the year honoree. His scoring and rebounding decreased slightly, however, to averages of 24.5 points and 6.2 rebounds per game. St. Bonaventure finished with a 14–13 overall record and in sixth place once again. During Belcher's four-year career, his teams compiled a record of 70 wins and 34 losses. He scored 2,077 points, which is second all-time in school history behind Greg Sanders' 2,238 but still ahead of Hall of Famer Bob Lanier, who sits third on the list.

== Later life ==
After college, the San Antonio Spurs selected him in the fourth round (87th overall) in the 1981 NBA draft. He was supposed to be the back-up to future Hall of Famer George Gervin in 1981–82 but he never appeared in a regular season game. When he broke all of the bones in his right ankle during a preseason exhibition game, his basketball career officially ended, with the exception of a two-game attempted comeback with the Continental Basketball Association's Wyoming Wildcatters. He then went home to Syracuse, New York to work for his old high school basketball coach at Niagara Mohawk Gas and Electric Company. He concurrently pursued a master's degree in business (MBA) at the State University of New York at Oswego, and in 1999 he received his degree.

Belcher is an actor and musician as well and plays the saxophone. After Niagara Mohawk Gas and Electric Company downsized and he lost his job, Belcher became a professional jazz musician. He is also a proficient on piano, trumpet, drums, upright bass and guitar player and utilizes his musical ability in Albany and Schenectady, New York. Aside from performing in a jazz trio alongside his wife, Sarah, Belcher also holds a regular day job.
