= Freddie Crawford =

American basketball player (born 1941)

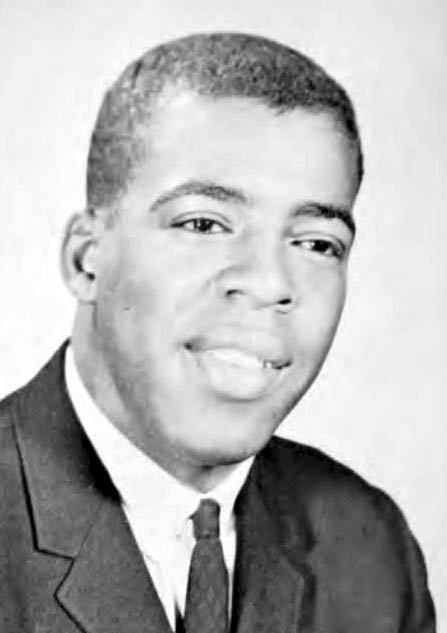
- Crawford in 1962

Personal information
- Born: December 23, 1941 (age 84) New York City, New York, U.S.
- Listed height: 6 ft 4 in (1.93 m)
- Listed weight: 189 lb (86 kg)

Career information
- High school: Samuel Gompers (Bronx, New York)
- College: St. Bonaventure (1960–1964)
- NBA draft: 1964: 4th round, 26th overall pick
- Drafted by: New York Knicks
- Playing career: 1964–1971
- Position: Shooting guard
- Number: 4, 12, 16, 15, 11

Career history
- 1964–1967: Wilmington Blue Bombers
- 1967–1968: New York Knicks
- 1968–1969: Los Angeles Lakers
- 1969–1970: Milwaukee Bucks
- 1970: Buffalo Braves
- 1970–1971: Philadelphia 76ers

Career highlights
- EPBL champion (1966); All-EPBL First Team (1966); No. 54 retired by St. Bonaventure Bonnies

Career NBA statistics
- Points: 2,031
- Rebounds: 746
- Assists: 610
- Stats at NBA.com
- Stats at Basketball Reference

Frederick Russell Crawford Jr. (born December 23, 1941) is an American former basketball player who played in the National Basketball Association (NBA). Crawford was drafted in the fourth round of the 1964 NBA draft by the New York Knicks. Previously, he had been drafted by the Knicks in the 1963 NBA draft. He eventually played with the Knicks in the NBA in 1967. The following year, he was sold to the Los Angeles Lakers. In 1969, he was again sold, this time to the Milwaukee Bucks. Later, Crawford was selected by the Buffalo Braves in the 1970 NBA expansion draft. He was traded to the Philadelphia 76ers later that year.

Crawford played for the Wilmington Blue Bombers of the Eastern Professional Basketball League (EPBL) from 1964 to 1967. He won an EPBL championship with the Blue Bombers in 1966. Crawford was selected to the All-EPBL First Team in 1966.

== NBA career statistics ==
Legend
GP	Games played	GS	Games started	MPG	Minutes per game
FG%	Field goal percentage	3P%	3-point field goal percentage	FT%	Free throw percentage
RPG	Rebounds per game	APG	Assists per game	SPG	Steals per game
BPG	Blocks per game	PPG	Points per game	**Bold**	Career high

=== Regular season ===
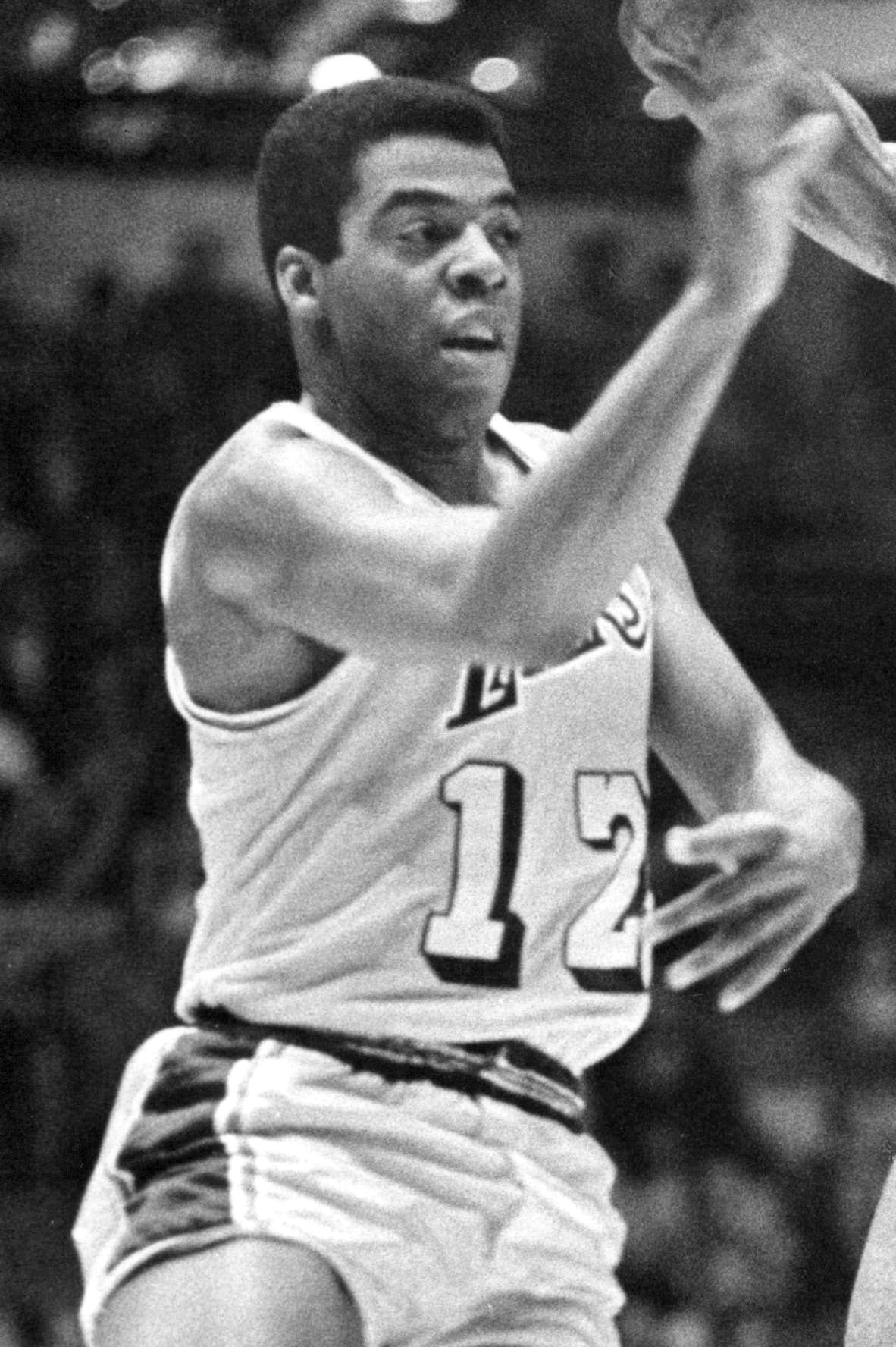
Crawford with the Lakers in 1969

Year	Team	GP	GS	MPG	FG%	3P%	FT%	RPG	APG	SPG	BPG	PPG
1966–67	New York	19	-	10.1	.379	-	.632	2.5	0.6	-	-	5.9
1967–68	New York	31	-	13.7	.367	-	.627	2.7	1.5	-	-	5.4
1967–68	Los Angeles	38	-	19.9	**.482**	-	.617	**2.9**	2.5	-	-	**10.3**
1968–69	Los Angeles	**81**	-	**20.9**	.465	-	.539	2.7	1.9	-	-	6.2
1969–70	Milwaukee	77	-	17.3	.480	-	**.682**	2.4	**2.9**	-	-	7.6
1970–71	Buffalo	15	-	13.5	.340	-	.615	2.3	1.6	-	-	5.9
1970–71	Philadelphia	36	-	12.5	.423	-	.444	1.9	1.5	-	-	5.0
Career		297	-	17.0	.446	-	.595	2.5	2.1	-	-	6.8

=== Playoffs ===
Year	Team	GP	GS	MPG	FG%	3P%	FT%	RPG	APG	SPG	BPG	PPG
1966–67	New York	4	-	**28.0**	.425	-	.500	**6.0**	**4.0**	-	-	**17.0**
1967–68	Los Angeles	**15**	-	17.1	.434	-	.543	2.3	1.1	-	-	6.1
1968–69	Los Angeles	5	-	4.0	**.500**	-	.000	0.6	0.6	-	-	0.8
1969–70	Milwaukee	10	-	20.8	.386	-	**.833**	3.5	3.7	-	-	8.8
1970–71	Philadelphia	1	-	9.0	**.500**	-	.750	0.0	1.0	-	-	7.0
Career		35	-	17.3	.417	-	.632	2.8	2.1	-	-	7.4
