= Bill McClintock =

American basketball player and coach

Personal information
- Born: Milwaukee, Wisconsin
- Listed height: 6 ft 4 in (1.93 m)
- Listed weight: 215 lb (98 kg)

Career information
- High school: West Division (Milwaukee, Wisconsin)
- College: Monterey Peninsula (1957–1958); California (1958–1961)
- NBA draft: 1961: 6th round, 54th overall pick
- Drafted by: Los Angeles Lakers
- Position: Forward
- Number: 42

Career history

Playing
- 1961–1962: San Francisco Saints

Coaching
- 1971–1972: San Francisco (assistant)
- 1996–1998: San Jose State (assistant)
- 1999–2003: Cal State Monterey Bay

Career highlights
- NCAA champion (1959); 2× First-team All-AAWU (1960, 1961)
- Stats at Basketball Reference

William Charles McClintock is a retired American basketball player and coach. He is best known for his college career at the University of California, where he was an All-Conference player and a key player for the school's 1959 NCAA championship team.

== High school and junior college ==
A 6'4" forward, McClintock played for West Division High School in Milwaukee, Wisconsin, graduating in 1954. However, he received minimal recruiting interest from in state schools like Marquette and Wisconsin, and ended up taking an apprenticeship at a foundry. He was recruited by Cal coach Pete Newell. He spent a year at Monterey Peninsula College (a junior college) getting his academics in order, then joined the Golden Bears' lineup for the 1958–59 season.

== College career ==
In his first season with the Golden Bears, McClintock was a key contributor throughout the season, helping the team to the 1959 NCAA championship. McClintock started each game of the tournament, averaging 8.2 points per game. He led the Bears in rebounding in their Western semifinal game against Utah with 12. Cal defeated Cincinnati and West Virginia (with stars Oscar Robertson and Jerry West respectively) to win the title.

As a junior, both McClintock's role and statistics increased. He scored 11.9 points per game and was named first team All-Conference by the Athletic Association of Western Universities (now the Pac-12 Conference). He and center Darrall Imhoff again led the Golden Bears to the NCAA championship game, though this time the Bears lost to Jerry Lucas and the Ohio State Buckeyes. With the departure of Imhoff the following season, McClintock assumed the role of team leader. He averaged 15.0 points and 10.6 rebounds per game and was again named to the All-Conference team.

== Coaching career ==
Following the close of his college career, McClintock was drafted in the sixth round of the 1961 NBA draft (54th pick overall) by the Los Angeles Lakers. However, he did not play in the NBA. He instead moved into coaching, where was an assistant at Bellarmine College Prep in San Jose, the University of San Francisco, and San Jose State, and was head coach and athletic director at Division II Cal State Monterey Bay. McClintock also maintained a long relationship with his college coach Pete Newell, including long-standing involvement with Newell's Big Man and Tall Woman camps for post players.

== Head coaching record ==
Record table
Season	Team	Overall	Conference	Standing	Postseason
Cal State Monterey Bay Otters (California Pacific Conference) (1999–2003)
1999–2000	Cal State Monterey Bay	9–18	5–9	4th (South)	
2000–01	Cal State Monterey Bay	9–20	7–7	4th (South)	
2001–02	Cal State Monterey Bay	15–16	9–5		
2002–03	Cal State Monterey Bay	15–14	10–4	T–1st (South)	
Total:		48–69			
National champion Postseason invitational champion Conference regular season champion Conference regular season and conference tournament champion Division regular season champion Division regular season and conference tournament champion Conference tournament champion
