= Sacramento Kings draft history =

This is a list of draft picks by the Sacramento Kings of the NBA. In total, the Kings have had 514 draft picks.

== Key ==
Naismith Basketball Hall of Famer	First overall NBA draft pick	Selected for an NBA All-Star Game

== NBA Draft picks ==
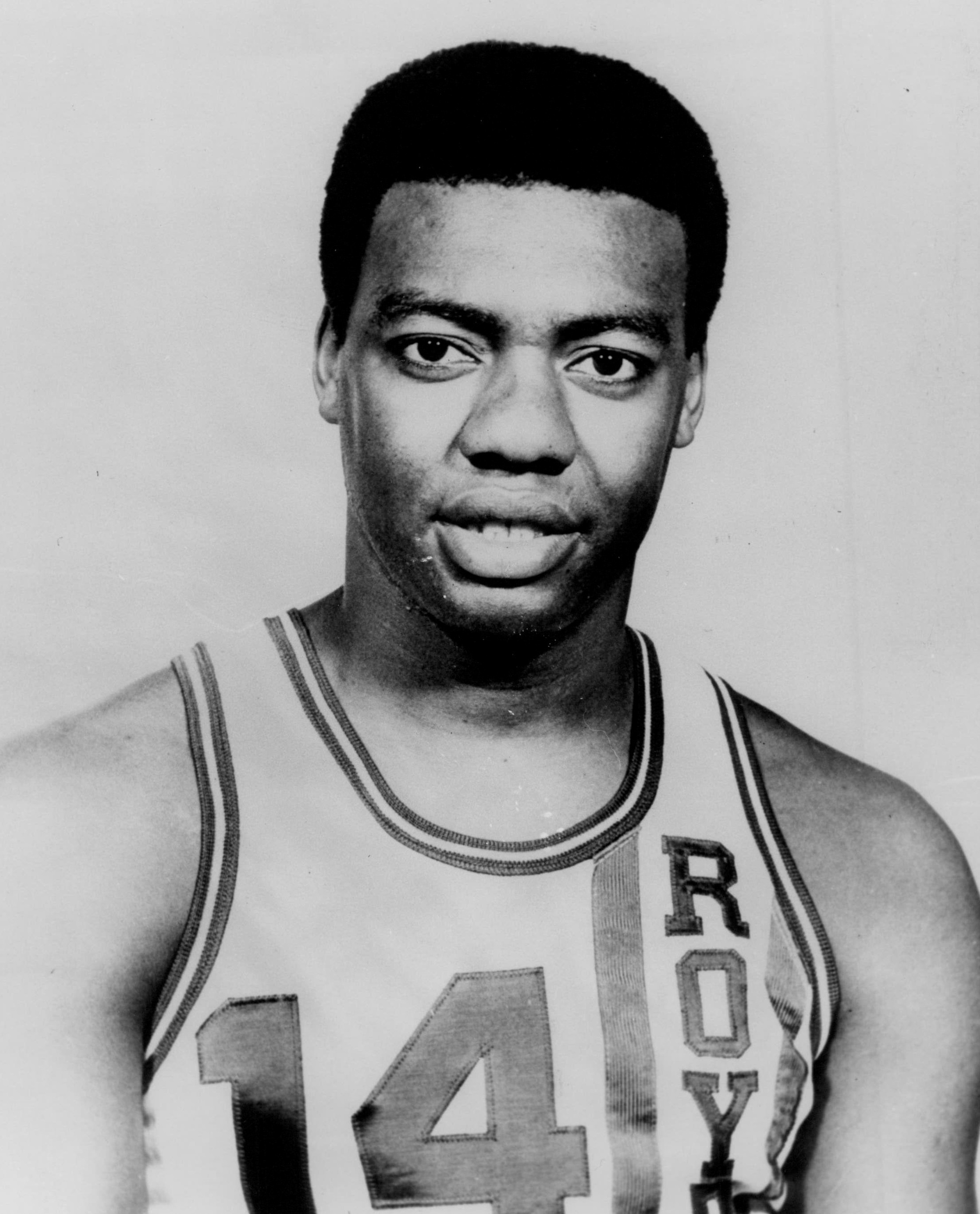
Hall of Famer Oscar Robertson, the first pick in the 1960 NBA draft, is one of only three players in NBA history to average a triple-double for a season. He was also the MVP of the 1963–64 NBA season.

Year	League	Round	Pick	Player	College/High School/Club
2025		2	42	Maxime Reynaud	Stanford
2024		1	13	Devin Carter	Providence
2024		2	45	Jamal Shead	Houston
2023		1	24	Olivier-Maxence Prosper	Marquette
2023		2	38	Jordan Walsh	Arkansas
2023		2	54	Jalen Slawson	Furman
2022	NBA	1	4	Keegan Murray	Iowa
2021	NBA	1	9	Davion Mitchell	Baylor
2021	NBA	2	39	Neemias Queta	Utah State University
2020	NBA	1	12	Tyrese Haliburton	Iowa State
2020	NBA	2	35	Xavier Tillman	Michigan State
2020	NBA	2	43	Jahmi'us Ramsey	Texas Tech
2020	NBA	2	52	Kenyon Martin Jr.	IMG Academy
2019	NBA	2	40	Justin James	University of Wyoming
2019	NBA	2	47	Ignas Brazdeikis	University of Michigan
2019	NBA	2	60	Vanja Marinkovic	
2018	NBA	1	2	Marvin Bagley	Duke University
2018	NBA	2	37	Gary Trent Jr.	Duke University
2017	NBA	1	5	De'Aaron Fox	University of Kentucky
2017	NBA	1	10	Zach Collins	Gonzaga University
2017	NBA	2	34	Frank Mason III	University of Kansas
2016	NBA	1	8	Marquese Chriss	University of Washington
2016	NBA	2	59	Isaiah Cousins	University of Oklahoma
2015	NBA	1	6	Willie Cauley-Stein	University of Kentucky
2014	NBA	1	8	Nik Stauskas	University of Michigan
2013	NBA	1	7	Ben McLemore	University of Kansas
2013	NBA	2	36	Ray McCallum Jr.	University of Detroit Mercy
2012	NBA	1	5	Thomas Robinson	University of Kansas
2012	NBA	2	36	Orlando Johnson	University of California, Santa Barbara
2011	NBA	1	7	Bismack Biyombo	
2011	NBA	2	35	Tyler Honeycutt	University of California, Los Angeles
2011	NBA	2	60	Isaiah Thomas	University of Washington
2010	NBA	1	5	DeMarcus Cousins	University of Kentucky
2010	NBA	2	33	Hassan Whiteside	Marshall University
2009	NBA	1	4	Tyreke Evans	University of Memphis
2009	NBA	1	23	Omri Casspi	
2008	NBA	1	12	Jason Thompson	Rider University
2008	NBA	2	42	Sean Singletary	University of Virginia
2008	NBA	2	43	Patrick Ewing Jr.	Georgetown University
2007	NBA	1	10	Spencer Hawes	University of Washington
2006	NBA	1	19	Quincy Douby	Rutgers University
2005	NBA	1	23	Francisco Garcia	University of Louisville
2004	NBA	1	26	Kevin Martin	Western Carolina University
2002	NBA	1	28	Dan Dickau	Gonzaga University
2002	NBA	2	57	Corsley Edwards	Central Connecticut State University
2001	NBA	1	25	Gerald Wallace	University of Alabama
2000	NBA	1	16	Hedo Turkoglu	
1999	NBA	2	45	Ryan Robertson	University of Kansas
1998	NBA	1	7	Jason Williams	University of Florida
1998	NBA	2	36	Jerome James	Florida Agricultural and Mechanical University
1997	NBA	1	11	Tariq Abdul-Wahad	San Jose State University
1997	NBA	2	39	Anthony Johnson	College of Charleston
1996	NBA	1	14	Peja Stojakovic	
1996	NBA	2	41	Jason Sasser	Texas Tech University
1995	NBA	1	13	Corliss Williamson	University of Arkansas
1995	NBA	2	47	Tyus Edney	University of California, Los Angeles
1995	NBA	2	51	Dejan Bodiroga	
1994	NBA	1	8	Brian Grant	Xavier University
1994	NBA	2	35	Michael Smith	Providence College
1994	NBA	2	51	Lawrence Funderburke	Ohio State University
1993	NBA	1	7	Bobby Hurley	Duke University
1993	NBA	2	31	Evers Burns	University of Maryland
1993	NBA	2	44	Alex Holcombe	Baylor University
1993	NBA	2	52	Mike Peplowski	Michigan State University
1992	NBA	1	7	Walt Williams	University of Maryland
1991	NBA	1	3	Billy Owens	Syracuse University
1991	NBA	1	27	Pete Chilcutt	University of North Carolina
1991	NBA	2	31	Randy Brown	New Mexico State University
1990	NBA	1	7	Lionel Simmons	La Salle University
1990	NBA	1	14	Travis Mays	University of Texas at Austin
1990	NBA	1	18	Duane Causwell	Temple University
1990	NBA	1	23	Anthony Bonner	Saint Louis University
1990	NBA	2	40	Bimbo Coles	Virginia Polytechnic Institute and State University
1989	NBA	1	1	Pervis Ellison	University of Louisville
1988	NBA	1	18	Ricky Berry	San Jose State University
1988	NBA	2	29	Vinny Del Negro	North Carolina State University
1987	NBA	1	6	Kenny Smith	University of North Carolina
1987	NBA	3	51	Sven Myer	University of Oregon
1987	NBA	4	74	Joe Arlauckas	Niagara University
1987	NBA	5	97	Vernon Carr	Michigan State University
1987	NBA	6	120	Darryl Thomas	Indiana University
1987	NBA	7	143	Scott Adubato	Upsala College
1986	NBA	1	17	Harold Pressley	Villanova University
1986	NBA	2	34	Johnny Rogers	University of California, Irvine
1986	NBA	3	57	Bruce Douglas	University of Illinois at Urbana-Champaign
1986	NBA	4	80	Alvin Franklin	University of Houston
1986	NBA	4	91	Bob Beecher	Virginia Polytechnic Institute and State University
1986	NBA	5	103	Keith Morrison	Washington State University
1986	NBA	6	126	John Flowers	University of Nevada, Las Vegas
1986	NBA	7	149	Ron Rankin	Southeast Missouri State University
1985	NBA	1	6	Joe Kleine	University of Arkansas
1985	NBA	3	51	Charlie Bradley	University of South Florida
1985	NBA	3	66	Michael Adams	Boston College
1985	NBA	4	76	Willie Simmons	Louisiana Tech University
1985	NBA	5	98	Bob Lojewski	Saint Joseph's University
1985	NBA	6	120	Charles Valentine	University of Arkansas
1985	NBA	7	145	Alton Gipson	Florida State University
1984	NBA	1	9	Otis Thorpe	Providence College
1984	NBA	3	54	Roosevelt Chapman	University of Dayton
1984	NBA	3	56	Jeff Allen	St. John's University
1984	NBA	4	80	Carl Henry	University of Kansas
1984	NBA	5	102	Jim Foster	University of South Carolina
1984	NBA	6	126	Bruce Vanley	University of Tulsa
1984	NBA	7	148	Chipper Harris	Robert Morris University (PA)
1984	NBA	8	172	Nate Rollins	Fort Hays State University
1984	NBA	9	193	Greg Turner	Auburn University
1984	NBA	10	216	Victor Coleman	Northwest Missouri State University
1983	NBA	1	13	Ennis Whatley	University of Alabama
1983	NBA	2	38	Chris McNealy	San Jose State University
1983	NBA	3	60	Steve Harriel	Washington State University
1983	NBA	4	84	Mike Jackson	University of Wyoming
1983	NBA	5	106	Lorenza Andrews	Oklahoma State University
1983	NBA	6	130	Alvis Rogers	Wake Forest University
1983	NBA	7	152	Dane Suttle	Pepperdine University
1983	NBA	8	176	Preston Neumayr	University of California, Davis
1983	NBA	9	197	Bernard Hill	Oklahoma Panhandle State University
1983	NBA	10	219	Aaron Haskins	Washington State University
1982	NBA	1	5	LaSalle Thompson	University of Texas at Austin
1982	NBA	1	17	Brook Steppe	Georgia Institute of Technology
1982	NBA	3	51	Jim Johnstone	Wake Forest University
1982	NBA	4	74	Mike Sanders	University of California, Los Angeles
1982	NBA	5	97	Kenny Simpson	Grambling State University
1982	NBA	6	120	Poncho Wright	University of Louisville
1982	NBA	7	143	Perry Range	University of Illinois at Urbana-Champaign
1982	NBA	8	166	Ed Nealy	Kansas State University
1982	NBA	9	189	Jack Moore	University of Nebraska
1982	NBA	10	210	Robert Estes	Iowa State University
1981	NBA	1	7	Steve Johnson	Oregon State University
1981	NBA	1	17	Kevin Loder	Alabama State University
1981	NBA	2	29	Eddie Johnson	University of Illinois at Urbana-Champaign
1981	NBA	3	58	Curtis Berry	University of Missouri
1981	NBA	4	78	Kenny Dennard	Duke University
1981	NBA	4	82	B. B. Davis	Lamar University
1981	NBA	5	104	Ulysses Reed	University of Arkansas
1981	NBA	6	128	Brian Walker	Purdue University
1981	NBA	7	150	Clinton Wheeler	William Paterson University
1981	NBA	8	173	Randy Smithson	Wichita State University
1981	NBA	9	194	Mike Perry	University of Richmond
1981	NBA	10	214	Mark Wilson	Fort Hays State University
1980	NBA	1	16	Hawkeye Whitney	North Carolina State University
1980	NBA	3	62	Tony Murphy	Southern University and A&M College
1980	NBA	5	108	Kevin Blakley	Eastern Michigan University
1980	NBA	6	131	Trent Grooms	Kent State University
1980	NBA	7	154	Arnold McDowell	Montana State University
1980	NBA	9	193	Charley Cole	Delta State University
1979	NBA	1	18	Reggie King	University of Alabama
1979	NBA	3	62	Terry Crosby	University of Tennessee
1979	NBA	4	85	John McCullough	University of Oklahoma
1979	NBA	5	105	Curtis Watkins	DePaul University
1979	NBA	6	126	Bob Roma	Princeton University
1979	NBA	7	145	Nick Daniels	Xavier University
1979	NBA	8	164	Tony Vann	University of Alabama in Huntsville
1979	NBA	9	181	Gary Wilson	Southern Illinois University
1979	NBA	10	200	Russell Saunders	University of New Mexico
1978	NBA	1	2	Phil Ford	University of North Carolina
1978	NBA	3	49	Jeff Cook	Idaho State University
1978	NBA	3	52	Mike Russell	Texas Tech University
1978	NBA	4	70	Jeffrey Crompton	University of North Carolina
1978	NBA	5	93	Derick Clairborne	University of Massachusetts Amherst
1978	NBA	6	114	Jim Krivacs	University of Texas at Austin
1978	NBA	7	136	Charles McMilliam	North Texas State University
1978	NBA	8	155	Ron Hammye	Bowling Green State University
1977	NBA	1	2	Otis Birdsong	University of Houston
1977	NBA	2	31	Eddie Owens	University of Nevada, Las Vegas
1977	NBA	3	45	Bill Paterno	University of Notre Dame
1977	NBA	3	53	John Kuester	University of North Carolina
1977	NBA	4	75	Larry Williams	Texas Southern University
1977	NBA	5	97	Bob Chapman	Michigan State University
1977	NBA	6	119	Bob Cooper	Providence College
1977	NBA	7	139	Bruce Jenner (Note: Jenner changed her name due to gender transition in 2015.)	Graceland University
1976	NBA	1	3	Richard Washington	University of California, Los Angeles
1976	NBA	4	54	Clarence Ramsey	University of Washington
1976	NBA	5	71	Willie Hodge	Duke University
1976	NBA	6	89	Andre McCarter	University of California, Los Angeles
1976	NBA	7	107	Craig Prosser	Canisius College
1976	NBA	8	125	Mike Davis	Bradley University
1976	NBA	9	143	Dave Logan	University of Colorado
1976	NBA	10	160	Harry Bailey	North Texas State University
1975	NBA	1	10	Bill Robinzine	DePaul University
1975	NBA	1	13	Bob Bigelow	University of Pennsylvania
1975	NBA	2	31	Glenn Hansen	Louisiana State University
1975	NBA	3	49	Bob Guyette	University of Kentucky
1975	NBA	4	67	Kevin Cleuss	St. John's University
1975	NBA	5	85	Ed Stahl	University of North Carolina
1975	NBA	6	103	Clint Chapman	University of Southern California
1975	NBA	7	121	Wayne Croft	Clemson University
1975	NBA	8	139	Jim Bostic	New Mexico State University
1974	NBA	1	6	Scott Wedman	University of Colorado
1974	NBA	2	24	Len Kosmalski	University of Tennessee
1974	NBA	4	60	Lloyd Batts	University of Cincinnati
1974	NBA	5	78	Terry Compton	Vanderbilt University
1974	NBA	6	96	Ron Kennedy	University of Arizona
1974	NBA	7	114	Mark Browne	Missouri Western State College
1974	NBA	8	132	Richie O'Connor	Fairfield University
1974	NBA	9	150	Jeff Dawson	University of Illinois at Urbana-Champaign
1974	NBA	10	167	Dennis White	University of Arkansas
1973	NBA	1	7	Ron Behagen	University of Minnesota
1973	NBA	2	20	Mike D'Antoni	Marshall University
1973	NBA	2	25	Larry McNeill	Marquette University
1973	NBA	5	76	M. L. Carr	Guilford College
1973	NBA	6	93	Mike Quick	University of San Francisco
1973	NBA	7	110	Mike Jeffries	University of Missouri
1973	NBA	8	127	Mike Williams	Kentucky Wesleyan College
1973	NBA	9	143	James Brown	Dartmouth College
1973	NBA	10	157	Ernie Kusyner	Kansas State University
1972	NBA	2	19	Sam Sibert	Kentucky State University
1972	NBA	2	28	Mike Ratliff	University of Wisconsin-Eau Claire
1972	NBA	3	38	Ron Riley	University of Southern California
1972	NBA	4	53	Frank Schade	University of Wisconsin-Eau Claire
1972	NBA	5	68	David Bustion	University of Denver
1972	NBA	6	86	Jerry Crocker	Guilford College
1972	NBA	7	102	Mike Sneed	Fayetteville State University
1972	NBA	8	119	Jerry Clack	Oklahoma State University
1972	NBA	9	134	Steve McMahon	Merrimack College
1972	NBA	10	148	David Hall	Kansas State University
1972	NBA	11	159	Floyd Mathew	Northern Arizona University
1972	NBA	12	168	Len Baltimore	George Washington University
1972	NBA	13	177	Kent Scott	University of Pittsburgh
1972	NBA	14	183	Bob Allen	University of Missouri
1972	NBA	15	190	Mike Jefferies	Oklahoma State University
1972	NBA	16	195	Mike Peterson	University of Nebraska
1971	NBA	1	4	Ken Durrett	La Salle University
1971	NBA	2	21	John Mengelt	Auburn University
1971	NBA	2	31	Joe Bergman	Creighton University
1971	NBA	3	38	Rich Yunkus	Georgia Institute of Technology
1971	NBA	4	55	Sid Catlett	University of Notre Dame
1971	NBA	5	72	Jim Guymond	Eastern New Mexico University
1971	NBA	5	73	Tyrone Marionneaux	Loyola University New Orleans
1971	NBA	6	89	Gil McGregor	Wake Forest University
1971	NBA	7	106	Ollie Shannon	University of Minnesota
1971	NBA	8	123	Frank Fitzgerald	Boston College
1970	NBA	1	5	Sam Lacey	New Mexico State University
1970	NBA	2	19	Nate Archibald	University of Texas at El Paso
1970	NBA	2	22	Doug Cook	Davidson College
1970	NBA	3	39	Greg Hyder	Eastern New Mexico University
1970	NBA	4	56	Wade Fuller	Loyola University of Chicago
1970	NBA	5	73	Uluss Thompson	Wiley College
1970	NBA	6	90	Charles Bishop	Louisiana Tech University
1970	NBA	7	107	Michael Bernard	Kentucky State University
1970	NBA	8	124	Joel McBride	Augusta State University
1970	NBA	9	141	Bob Mabry	University of Rio Grande
1970	NBA	10	158	Carl Johnson	Gustavus Adolphus
1970	NBA	11	173	Ted Hillary	Saint Joseph's College
1970	NBA	12	186	Reggie Roach	Virginia State University
1970	NBA	13	196	Larry Gray	Huston-Tillotson University
1970	NBA	14	206	Andy Jennings	Alderson-Broaddus College
1970	NBA	15	216	Mike Neer	Washington & Lee University
1970	NBA	16	225	Paul Favorite	Georgetown University
1969	NBA	1	8	Herm Gilliam	Purdue University
1969	NBA	3	37	Luther Rackley	Xavier University
1969	NBA	3	41	Luther Green	Long Island University
1969	NBA	4	51	Ron Sanford	University of New Mexico
1969	NBA	5	65	Jake Ford	University of Maryland Eastern Shore
1969	NBA	6	79	Mel Coleman	University of Wisconsin-Stout
1969	NBA	7	93	L.C. Bowen	Bradley University
1969	NBA	8	107	Merton Bancroft	Missouri State University
1969	NBA	9	121	James Hurley	Transylvania University
1969	NBA	10	135	Bill Bowes	Elon University
1969	NBA	11	149	Jim Supple	Georgetown University
1969	NBA	12	162	Mike Davis	Colorado State University
1969	NBA	13	174	Ted Johnson	Baldwin-Wallace College
1968	NBA	1	5	Zaid Abdul-Aziz	Iowa State University
1968	NBA	3	27	Pat Frink	University of Colorado
1968	NBA	3	28	Fred Foster	Miami University
1968	NBA	4	41	Dan Sparks	Weber State University
1968	NBA	5	55	Jim Kissane	Boston College
1968	NBA	6	69	Calvin Martin	Texas Southern University
1968	NBA	7	83	Dick Dumas	Northeastern State University
1968	NBA	8	97	Dave Williams	Mississippi State University
1968	NBA	9	111	Butch Joyner	Indiana University
1968	NBA	10	125	Robert Wyendanet	Vanderbilt University
1968	NBA	11	139	James Robinson	Rochester Institute of Technology
1968	NBA	12	152	Glynn Saulters	University of Louisiana at Monroe
1968	NBA	13	165	Bill Tindall	University of Massachusetts Amherst
1968	NBA	14	176	Charles Core	Southeastern Louisiana University
1968	NBA	15	185	Mike Drepling	Westminster College of Pennsylvania
1968	NBA	16	193	Dick Harris	Manchester College
1968	NBA	17	201	John Howard	University of Cincinnati
1968	NBA	18	207	Larry Humes	University of Evansville
1968	NBA	19	211	Jay Reffords	
1967	NBA	1	9	Mel Daniels	University of New Mexico
1967	NBA	3	26	Gary Gray	Oklahoma City University
1967	NBA	3	28	Sam Smith	Kentucky Wesleyan College
1967	NBA	4	38	Louie Dampier	University of Kentucky
1967	NBA	5	50	Trooper Washington	Cheyney University of Pennsylvania
1967	NBA	6	62	Frank Stronczek	American International College
1967	NBA	7	74	Charlie Beasley	Southern Methodist University
1967	NBA	8	86	Frank Hollendoner	Georgetown University
1967	NBA	9	97	Ron Sepic	Ohio State University
1967	NBA	10	108	Willie Davis	North Texas State University
1967	NBA	11	118	Ken Callaway	University of Cincinnati
1967	NBA	12	129	Frank Gadjunas	Villanova University
1967	NBA	13	138	John Moates	University of Richmond
1967	NBA	14	144	Jerry Pettway	Northwood Institute
1967	NBA	15	150	Earl Beechum	Midwestern State University
1967	NBA	16	155	John Vermelyea	Morningside College
1967	NBA	17	158	Darryll Meachem	Edinboro University of Pennsylvania
1966	NBA	1	6	Walt Wesley	University of Kansas
1966	NBA	2	16	Jerry Lee Wells	Oklahoma City University
1966	NBA	3	26	Jim Ware	Oklahoma City University
1966	NBA	4	36	Charles Schmaus	Virginia Military Institute
1966	NBA	5	47	Richard Parks	Saint Louis University
1966	NBA	6	56	Steve Cunningham	Western Kentucky University
1966	NBA	7	65	Gary Schull	Florida State University
1966	NBA	8	74	Ron Krick	University of Cincinnati
1966	NBA	9	81	Billy Smith	Loyola University of Chicago
1966	NBA	10	88	Freddie Lewis	Arizona State University
1966	NBA	11	95	R. B. Lynam	Oklahoma Baptist University
1965	NBA	1	7	Nate Bowman	Wichita State University
1965	NBA	2	15	Flynn Robinson	University of Wyoming
1965	NBA	3	24	Jon McGlocklin	Indiana University
1965	NBA	4	33	Bob Love	Southern University and A&M College
1965	NBA	5	42	Warren Isaac	Iona College
1965	NBA	6	51	Leon Clements	Ouachita Baptist University
1965	NBA	7	59	Jeff Gehring	Miami University
1965	NBA	8	67	Jim Fox	University of South Carolina
1965	NBA	9	73	Ron Krick	University of Cincinnati
1965	NBA	10	79	Richie Dec	Seton Hall University
1965	NBA	11	85	Dick Maile	Louisiana State University
1965	NBA	12	91	Robert McCollough	Benedict College
1965	NBA	13	96	Oliver Jones	Albany State University
1965	NBA	14	100	Larry Franks	University of Texas at Austin
1965	NBA	15	104	Ronald Scharf	Georgia Institute of Technology
1965	NBA	16	108	Willie Porter	Tennessee State University
1964	NBA	Territorial pick		George Wilson	University of Cincinnati
1964	NBA	2	15	Bill Chmielewski	University of Dayton
1964	NBA	3	24	Steve Courtin	Saint Joseph's University
1964	NBA	4	33	Happy Hairston	New York University
1964	NBA	5	42	George Kirk	University of Memphis
1964	NBA	6	51	Al Thresher	Wittenberg University
1964	NBA	7	60	Vic Rouse	Loyola University of Chicago
1964	NBA	8	69	Joe Gieger	Xavier University
1964	NBA	9	76	Scotty Pierce	West Texas A&M University
1964	NBA	10	83	Bob Neumann	University of Memphis
1964	NBA	11	89	Jim Reynolds	Abilene Christian University
1964	NBA	12	93	Fred Jones	Youngstown State University
1963	NBA	T		Tom Thacker	University of Cincinnati
1963	NBA	3	22	Jimmy Rayl	Indiana University
1963	NBA	4	31	Ken Charlton	University of Colorado
1963	NBA	5	40	Mac Herndon	Bradley University
1963	NBA	6	49	Jim McCormack	West Virginia University
1963	NBA	7	58	Hunter Beckman	University of Memphis
1962	NBA	T		Jerry Lucas	Ohio State University
1962	NBA	2	13	Bud Olsen	University of Louisville
1962	NBA	3	22	Chris Appel	University of Southern California
1962	NBA	4	31	Jack Thobe	Xavier University
1962	NBA	5	40	Mike Wroblewski	Kansas State University
1962	NBA	6	49	Jerry Foster	Drake University
1962	NBA	7	58	Gary Cunningham	University of California, Los Angeles
1962	NBA	8	66	Ed Bento	Loyola Marymount University
1962	NBA	9	75	Chris Jones	Carson-Newman College
1962	NBA	10	83	George Knighton	New Mexico State University
1962	NBA	11	88	Frank Pinchback	Xavier University
1961	NBA	1	3	Larry Siegfried	Ohio State University
1961	NBA	2	11	Bob Wiesenhahn	University of Cincinnati
1961	NBA	3	25	Bevo Nordmann	Saint Louis University
1961	NBA	4	34	Lowery Kirk	University of Memphis
1961	NBA	5	43	Rossie Johnson	Tennessee State University
1961	NBA	6	52	Bob Slobodnik	Duquesne University
1961	NBA	7	61	Dave Zeller	Miami University
1961	NBA	8	70	Jerry Thelen	Thomas More College
1961	NBA	9	78	Larry Krueger	Ohio University
1961	NBA	10	85	Jack Waters	University of Mississippi
1961	NBA	11	93	Carl Short	Newberry College
1961	NBA	12	100	George Patterson	University of Toledo
1961	NBA	13	103	Clair McRoberts	Monmouth University
1961	NBA	14	106	Carl Bouldin	University of Cincinnati
1960	NBA	T	1	Oscar Robertson	University of Cincinnati
1960	NBA	2	9	Jay Arnette	University of Texas at Austin
1960	NBA	3	17	Ralph Davis	University of Cincinnati
1960	NBA	4	25	Dalen Showalter	University of Tennessee
1960	NBA	5	33	Don Ogorek	Seattle University
1960	NBA	6	41	Bobby Joe Mason	Bradley University
1960	NBA	7	49	Fred Sobrero	Santa Clara University
1960	NBA	8	56	Sam Stith	St. Bonaventure University
1960	NBA	9	63	Al Nealey	Arizona State University
1960	NBA	10	70	Lon Sizemore	West Virginia University Institute of Technology
1960	NBA	11	75	Dennis Moore	Regis University
1960	NBA	12	80	Ron Altenberg	Cornell College
1960	NBA	13	85	John Milhoan	Marshall University
1960	NBA	14	88	Larry Chaney	Montana State University
1960	NBA	15	90	Ducky Potter	Moravian College
1960	NBA	16	92	Gene Jordan	Northwest Missouri State University
1960	NBA	17	94	Ernie McCray	University of Arizona
1960	NBA	18	96	Don Mills	University of Kentucky
1960	NBA	19	98	Larry Willey	University of Cincinnati
1960	NBA	20	99	Tony Wilcox	Wittenberg University
1960	NBA	21	100	Jim McDonald	West Virginia Wesleyan College
1959	NBA	1	1	Bob Boozer	Kansas State University
1959	NBA	3	15	Mike Mendenhall	University of Cincinnati
1959	NBA	4	23	Leo Byrd	Marshall University
1959	NBA	5	31	Harry Kirchner	Texas Christian University
1959	NBA	6	39	Don Hennon	University of Pittsburgh
1959	NBA	7	47	Dale Moore	Eastern Kentucky University
1959	NBA	8	54	Don Matuszak	Kansas State University
1959	NBA	9	60	Joe Billy McDade	Bradley University
1959	NBA	10	66	Joe Viviano	Xavier University
1959	NBA	11	72	Charlie Brown	Seattle University
1959	NBA	12	78	Roger Wendel	University of Tulsa
1958	NBA	1	2	Archie Dees	Indiana University
1958	NBA	2	9	Vern Hatton	University of Kentucky
1958	NBA	3	17	Bucky Bockhorn	University of Dayton
1958	NBA	4	25	Red Murrell	Drake University
1958	NBA	5	33	Jim Fulmer	University of Alabama
1958	NBA	6	41	Jim McClennan	Saint Francis University
1958	NBA	7	49	Wayne Stevens	University of Cincinnati
1958	NBA	8	57	Bob Mantz	Lafayette College
1958	NBA	9	64	Larry Staverman	Thomas More College
1958	NBA	10	70	Jack Parr	Kansas State University
1958	NBA	11	75	Frank Tartaton	Xavier University
1958	NBA	12	79	Don Medsker	Iowa State University
1958	NBA	13	83	Jerry DuPont	University of Louisville
1958	NBA	14	84	Jim Newcomb	Duke University
1958	NBA	15	85	Adrian Smith	University of Kentucky
1958	NBA	16	86	Jack McCarthy	University of Dayton
1958	NBA	17	87	John Powell	Miami University
1957	NBA	1	1	Hot Rod Hundley	West Virginia University
1957	NBA	2	9	Dick Duckett	St. John's University
1957	NBA	3	17	Jerry Paulson	Manhattan College
1957	NBA	4	25	Jed Dormeyer	University of Minnesota
1957	NBA	5	33	Stewart Murray	Lafayette College
1957	NBA	6	41	John Maglio	North Carolina State University
1957	NBA	7	49	Chet Forte	Columbia University
1957	NBA	8	56	Bob Daniels	Western Kentucky University
1957	NBA	9	63	Dick Heise	DePaul University
1957	NBA	10	70	Mel Wright	Oklahoma State University
1957	NBA	11	76	Cliff Hafer	North Carolina State University
1957	NBA	12	79	Jim Boothe	Xavier University
1956	NBA	1	1	Si Green	Duquesne University
1956	NBA			Bob Burrow	University of Kentucky
1956	NBA			Carl Cain	University of Iowa
1956	NBA			Gene Carpenter	Texas Tech University
1956	NBA			Clayton Carter	Oklahoma State University
1956	NBA			Dan Mannix	St. Francis College
1956	NBA			Johnny McCarthy	Canisius College
1956	NBA			Jerry Moreman	University of Louisville
1956	NBA			Dave Piontek	Xavier University
1956	NBA			Kevin Thomas	Boston University
1956	NBA			Bill Uhl	University of Dayton
1955	NBA	1	2	Maurice Stokes	Saint Francis University
1955	NBA	2	8	Jack Twyman	University of Cincinnati
1955	NBA	3	16	Ed Fleming	Niagara University
1955	NBA	4	24	Bob McKeen	University of California
1955	NBA	5	32	Bill Evans	University of Kentucky
1955	NBA			Bob Armstrong	Michigan State University
1955	NBA			Harry Jorgensen	University of Wyoming
1955	NBA			Jerry Jung	Kansas State University
1955	NBA			Jim McConnell	Niagara University
1955	NBA			John Prudhoe	University of Louisville
1955	NBA			Art Quimby	University of Connecticut
1955	NBA			Tony Vlastelica	Oregon State University
1954	NBA	1	7	Tom Marshall	Western Kentucky University
1954	NBA	2	16	Boris Nachamkin	New York University
1954	NBA	3	25	Lee Morton	Cornell University
1954	NBA	4	34	Art Spoelstra	Western Kentucky University
1954	NBA	5	43	Bo Erias	Niagara University
1954	NBA	6	52	Red Davis	St. John's University
1954	NBA	7	61	Bill Hull	Utah State University
1954	NBA	8	70	Paul Morrow	University of Wisconsin
1954	NBA	9	78	Roy Irvin	University of Southern California
1954	NBA	10	87	Ed Parchinski	Fordham University
1954	NBA	11	95	Jim Paxson	University of Dayton
1953	NBA	1	4	Richie Regan	Seton Hall University
1953	NBA			Will Bales	Eastern Kentucky University
1953	NBA			Hugh Beins	Georgetown University
1953	NBA			Bill Edwards	St. Bonaventure University
1953	NBA			Jim Gerber	Bowling Green State University
1953	NBA			Bob Goss	North Carolina State University
1953	NBA			Dick Gross	Wheaton College
1953	NBA			Ed Kohl	Regis University
1953	NBA			John Kurz	Loyola Marymount University
1953	NBA			Gene Lambert	University of Arkansas
1953	NBA			Nick McGuire	Villanova University
1953	NBA			Frank Reddout	Syracuse University
1953	NBA			Jim Scottie	West Virginia University
1953	NBA			Kenny Sears	Santa Clara University
1953	NBA			Kendall Sheets	Oklahoma State University
1953	NBA			Tex Silverman	George Washington University
1953	NBA			Paul Smaagard	Hamline University
1953	NBA			Norm Swanson	University of Detroit Mercy
1953	NBA			Will Walls	Miami University
1952	NBA	1	8	Chuck Darling	University of Iowa
1952	NBA			Bryant Ivey	University of Alabama
1952	NBA			Leroy Leslie	University of Notre Dame
1952	NBA			Ronnie MacGilvray	St. John's University
1952	NBA			Jewell McDowell	Texas A&M University
1952	NBA			Jack McMahon	St. John's University
1952	NBA			Sam Miranda	Indiana University
1952	NBA			Jerry Romney	Brigham Young University
1952	NBA			Ray Royce	University of Houston
1952	NBA			Arnold Smith	City College of New York
1952	NBA			Ray Sonnenberg	Saint Louis University
1952	NBA			Ray Steiner	Saint Louis University
1952	NBA			Bob Whitmer	Florida State University
1951	NBA	1	8	Sam Ranzino	North Carolina State University
1951	NBA	2	17	Ray Ragelis	Northwestern University
1951	NBA	3	27	Fred Diute	St. Bonaventure University
1951	NBA	4	37	Elmer Behnke	Bradley University
1951	NBA	5	47	Dan Bagley	University of Notre Dame
1951	NBA	6	57	Jim Ove	Valparaiso University
1951	NBA	7	67	John Brown	Southern Methodist University
1951	NBA	8	76	George Davidson	Lafayette College
1950	NBA	1	9	Joe McNamee	University of San Francisco
1950	NBA	2		George Stanich	University of California, Los Angeles
1950	NBA	3		Bob Roper	John Carroll University
1950	NBA	4		Chet Giermak	College of William & Mary
1950	NBA	5		Joe Nelson	Brigham Young University
1950	NBA	6		John Givens	Western Kentucky University
1950	NBA	7		Dan Kahler	Southwestern College
1950	NBA	8		Carl Kraushaar	University of California, Los Angeles
1950	NBA	9		Warren Switzer	Rice University
1950	NBA	10		Harry Foley	Niagara University
1949	BAA	1	10	Pep Saul	Seton Hall University
1949	BAA	2		Jack Coleman	University of Louisville
1948	BAA	1	10	Bobby Wanzer	Seton Hall University
1948	BAA			Alex Athas	Tulane University
1948	BAA			Bill Gabor	Syracuse University
1948	BAA			Ed Keim	Niagara University
1948	BAA			Leo Kubiak	Bowling Green State University
1948	BAA			Johnny Macknowski	Seton Hall University
1948	BAA			Lionel Melamed	City College of New York
1948	BAA			Hank O'Keefe	Canisius College
1948	BAA			Warren Stickel	Syracuse University
1948	BAA			Paul Yesavi	Niagara University

== Notes ==
- "Sacramento Kings Draft Picks". Basketball-Reference.com.
