= American Basketball League (1961–1962) =

Former basketball league

- Sport: Basketball
- Founded: 1961
- Folded: 1962
- No. of teams: 8
- Country: United States
- Last champion: Kansas City Steers

The American Basketball League played one full season, 1961–1962, and approximately one-third of the next season until the league folded on December 31, 1962. The ABL was the first basketball league to have a three-point field goal for shots from a longer distance. Other rules that set the league apart from the National Basketball Association (NBA) were a 30-second shot clock, as opposed to 24, and a wider free throw lane of 18 feet instead of the NBA's 12 feet. The NBA would later expand their free throw lane to 16 feet (a couple of feet shorter than the ABL's free throw lane) in 1964, partially as a means of preventing the dominance of center play there.

== Formation ==
The league was formed when Harlem Globetrotters owner Abe Saperstein was not awarded the Los Angeles NBA franchise he felt he had been promised in return for his years of supporting the NBA with doubleheader games featuring his highly popular Trotters.

When Minneapolis Lakers owner Bob Short was permitted to move the Lakers to Los Angeles, Saperstein reacted by convincing National Alliance of Basketball Leagues (NABL) team owner Paul Cohen (Tuck Tapers) and Amateur Athletic Union (AAU) National Champion Cleveland Pipers owner George Steinbrenner to take the top NABL and AAU teams and players and form a rival league.

Saperstein had been secretly planning the new league since 1959 but it is unclear whether he would have abandoned these plans had he been granted the NBA franchise. In reality, Saperstein and Cohen each secretly made arrangements with local promoters in the other cities to finance those teams so there would be an eight-team league. The eight teams would be separated into two divisions: the East Division (originally hosting the Chicago Majors, Cleveland Pipers, Pittsburgh Rens, and Washington Tapers) and the West Division (hosting the Hawaii Chiefs, Kansas City Steers, Los Angeles Jets, and San Francisco Saints).

Saperstein placed the Los Angeles Jets to take on the transplanted Lakers. He got Bill Sharman as coach and signed former NBA players Larry Friend and George Yardley to give the team instant credibility. The idea backfired; the Jets did not last the season.

== George Steinbrenner ==
In Cleveland, Steinbrenner's coach was John McLendon, who became the first African-American coach of a major pro basketball team. He was hired by Pipers' general manager, Mike Cleary, later the Executive Director of the National Association of Collegiate Directors of Athletics. McLendon had several of his star players from Tennessee State such as John Barnhill and Ben Warley, plus several former Akron Wingfoots, such as Johnny Cox and Jimmy Darrow, who had won the AAU National Championship the year before. In a game against the Hawaii Chiefs, Steinbrenner sold player Grady McCollum to the Chiefs at halftime. McLendon chafed at Steinbrenner's interference and quit in midseason, following the team's return from playing in Hawaii. Steinbrenner immediately named Sharman, from the recently defunct Jets, as his coach, and the Pipers went on to win the only ABL title in the league's brief history.

== Jerry Lucas ==
Steinbrenner signed All-American Jerry Lucas to a contract worth $40,000. With the Lucas signing, Steinbrenner had a secret deal with NBA commissioner Maurice Podoloff. The Pipers would merge with the Kansas City Steers and join the NBA. A schedule was printed for the 1963–64 NBA season with the Pipers playing the New York Knicks in the first game. The gambit worked, but the ABL sued to block the move, and as a result Steinbrenner had a team and no league. Instead of returning to the ABL, Steinbrenner folded his tent.

== Relocation ==
The Hawaii Chiefs drew well, but other teams felt the cost of air travel was prohibitive, resulting in scheduling that saw the Eastern teams playing all of their games in Hawaii within a 5-6 day period and vice versa. After that first season, the Chiefs relocated to Long Beach, California. The San Francisco Saints escaped head-to-head competition with the newly relocated San Francisco Warriors by heading to Oakland. Paul Cohen, who secretly owned the Pittsburgh team as well as officially owning the Tapers, moved the Tapers again from New York, where they had been an NABL powerhouse for years, to Philadelphia, where he hoped to fill the void of the move of the Warriors (with Wilt Chamberlain) from Philadelphia to San Francisco.

The radical changes, combined with uneven attendance (although some teams, such as the Kansas City Steers, drew well), and no fresh capital from new owners, caused Saperstein and Cohen to decide to throw in the towel with the close of 1962 on December 31. The league that pioneered the three-point shot and the wider foul line (both eventually adopted by the rest of the basketball world) was gone. After the ABL folded, Steinbrenner had $125,000 in debts and personal losses of $2 million.

== Teams ==
- Chicago Majors (1961–62, 1962–63)
- Cleveland Pipers (1961–62)
- Kansas City Steers (1961–62, 1962–63)
- Long Beach Chiefs (1962–63 as Hawaii Chiefs in 1961–62)
- Los Angeles Jets (1961–62, disbanded during season)
- Oakland Oaks (1962–63 as San Francisco Saints in 1961–62)
- Philadelphia Tapers (1962–63, as Washington Tapers in 1961–62; moved to New York during 1961–62 season; as New York Tapers in 1961–62)
- Pittsburgh Rens (1961–62, 1962–63)

== Champions ==
Year	Winner	Result	Runner-up
1961–62	Cleveland Pipers	3–2	Kansas City Steers
1962–63	Kansas City Steers declared champions		

== Notable players ==
List of ABL players:

- Jack Adams
- Dick Barnett
- Sylvester "Sy" Blye
- Bucky Bolyard
- Bill Bridges
- Frank Burgess
- Jeff Cohen
- Kelly Coleman
- Gene Conley
- Johnny Cox
- Connie Dierking
- Bevo Francis
- Connie Hawkins
- Tony Jackson
- Roger Kaiser
- Maurice King
- Herb Lee
- Walt Mangham
- Nick Mantis
- Phil Rollins
- Fred Sawyer
- Ken Sears
- Larry Siegfried
- Bill Spivey
- Bruce Spraggins
- Larry Staverman
- John F. Sullivan
- Dan Swartz
- Roger Taylor
- Gene Tormohlen
- Herschell Turner
- Ben Warley
- Win Wilfong
- George Yardley
- Wayne Yates

== Drafts ==
During the new ABL's existence, Abe Saperstein and the league would compete with the NBA by creating their own draft system against the NBA draft system of that era in time. They would only have two whole ABL drafts to work with during their existence before prematurely shutting down the league in 1962.

=== 1961 ABL draft ===
The inaugural ABL draft took place at Chicago, Illinois on March 19, 1961, over a week before the 1961 NBA draft began. The ABL proved to be a helpful alternative for some players that had been implicated in the 1961 NCAA University Division men's basketball gambling scandal (as well as the 1951 college basketball point-shaving scandal in the case of Bill Spivey), as a select few players like Tony Jackson and Connie Hawkins (who would not be drafted there, but would sign up with the ABL following this draft) would manage to see professional playing time they otherwise wouldn't have due to their bans from the NBA at the time. Outside of those players, however, the ABL would see scant success from this year’s draft with the players they got, as a vast majority of players would sign with the NBA instead if they weren't banned from that league already. Outside of that, only the territorial selections for this year (which every team got two of this year) were officially recorded for each team. While every team got enough picks to showcase entire, proper teams, no known round records were officially held during that period of time, though it was known that Rafer Johnson was drafted in what could technically be considered the first round of that draft (even though he's officially considered to be a territorial pick) by the Los Angeles Jets and he would go into the 1956 & 1960 Summer Olympics for the decathlon.

Territorial Picks

Chicago Majors

- Hank Whitney, Iowa State University
- Don Kojis, Marquette University

Cleveland Pipers

- Larry Siegfried, Ohio State University
- Walt Bellamy, Indiana University

Hawaii Chiefs

- Frank Burgess, Gonzaga University
- Dave Mills, Seattle University

Kansas City Steers

- Bob Nordmann, St. Louis University
- Charlie Henke, University of Missouri

Los Angeles Jets

- Rafer Johnson, University of California, Los Angeles
- Gary Phillips, University of Houston

Pittsburgh Rens

- Tom Stith, St. Bonaventure University
- Jack Egan, St. Joseph's College

San Francisco Saints

- Tom Meschery, St. Mary's College of California
- Bill McClintock, University of California

Washington Tapers

- Doug Moe, University of North Carolina
- Roger Kaiser, Georgia Institute of Technology

Additional Selections

Chicago Majors

- Howie Carl, DePaul University
- Jack Turner, University of Louisville
- Fred Sawyer, University of Louisville
- John Wessels, University of Illinois
- John Tidwell, University of Michigan
- Bill Crosby, University of Notre Dame
- Tom Lewis, Wake Forest College
- Carl Cole, Eastern Kentucky State College
- Stanley Niewierowski, North Carolina State College
- Sam Barnard, Iowa State University
- Joe Scott, University of Missouri
- Ron Zagar, University of Iowa
- Skip Wolfe, Memphis State University
- Jim Kowalke, University of Nebraska

Cleveland Pipers

- Ned Jennings, University of Kentucky
- Rossie Johnson, Tennessee A&I University
- George Finley, Tennessee A&I University
- Art Werts, Tennessee A&I University
- Richie Hoyt, Ohio State University
- Tom Chilton, East Tennessee State College
- Bunk Adams, Ohio University
- Bob Wiesenhahn, University of Cincinnati
- Bob Pawlak, Toledo University
- Phil Dubensky, University of Dayton
- Ed Auzenbergs, Columbia University

Hawaii Chiefs

- Jeff Cohen, College of William & Mary
- Doug Kistler, Duke University
- Chris Smith, University of Virginia
- Karl Anderson, Oregon State University
- Bill Depp, Vanderbilt University
- Max Perry, Utah State University
- Dale Wise, University of Evansville
- Jim Altenhofen, University of Portland
- Rollie Williams, University of Idaho
- Dave Eastis, Brigham Young University
- John Tulley, University of Notre Dame
- Albert Almanza, University of Texas
- Lowery Kirk, Memphis State University
- Dave Kissinger, Hardin–Simmons University

Kansas City Steers

- Bill Bridges, University of Kansas
- Cedrick Price, Kansas State University
- Glen Mankowski, St. Louis University
- David Voss, Temple University
- Larry Swift, Northeast Missouri State Teachers College
- Dick Kepley, University of North Carolina
- Whitey Martin, St. Bonaventure University
- Clyde Rhoden, University of Arkansas
- Don Jacobson, University of South Dakota
- Bob McDonald, University of Maryland
- Jerry Graves, Mississippi State University
- Dick Hickox, University of Miami, Florida
- Wayne Clark, University of Texas

Los Angeles Jets

- Bill Engesser, Los Angeles State College
- Bill Heymen, Los Angeles State College
- Leo Hill, Los Angeles State College
- Bill Ellis, University of California, Los Angeles
- Wayne Yates, Memphis State University
- York Larese, University of North Carolina
- Al Butler, Niagara University
- Clint Names, University of Washington
- Bill Lickert, University of Kentucky
- Al Saunders, Bradley University
- Jim Ritchie, West Virginia University
- Tom Grissom, North Texas State University

Pittsburgh Rens

- Tony Jackson, St. John's University
- Bob Slobodnik, Duquesne University
- Ned Twyman, Duquesne University
- John Fridley, University of Pittsburgh
- Dick Falenski, University of Pittsburgh
- Lee Patrone, West Virginia University
- Mark DuMars, Penn State University
- Ron Heller, Municipal University of Wichita
- Fred Moses, Oklahoma City University
- George Patterson, Toledo University
- Ron Godfrey, University of Miami, Florida
- Roger Brooks, Indiana State College
- Ernie Fields, Penn State University
- Don Black, University of Massachusetts
- Bob DiStefano, North Carolina State College
- Bob Ayersman, Virginia Polytechnic Institute
- Tom Booker, University of Richmond
- Pete Chudy, Syracuse University
- Jim Galicki, Toledo University

San Francisco Saints

- Stan Morrison, University of California
- Earl Shultz, University of California
- John Berberich, University of California, Los Angeles
- Jom Woodland, Oregon State University
- Charles Hardnett, Grambling College
- Steve Strange, Southern Methodist University
- Billy Joe Price, New Mexico State University
- Carroll Youngkin, Duke University
- Cleveland Buckner, Jackson State College
- Gene Wilfong, Memphis State University
- Bob Grinstead, University of Denver
- Vincent Kempton, St. Joseph's College
- Rex Tippitt, Grambling College
- Allen Holmes, University of Utah

Washington Tapers

- John Egan, Providence College
- Ted Luckenbill, University of Houston
- Charles Osborne, Western Kentucky State College
- Cleo Hill, Winston-Salem Teachers College
- Bruce Spraggins, Virginia Union University
- Walter Holtzclaw, North Carolina A&T State University
- George Ramming, Dartmouth College
- Jerry Steele, Wake Forest College
- Bev Vaughan, College of William & Mary
- Walter Ward, Hampton Institute
- Phil Estepp, Eastern Kentucky State College
- Bill Cramsey, University of Dayton
- Vern Lawson, Miami University, Ohio
- Tyler Wilbon, Utah State University

=== 1962 ABL draft ===
The second ABL draft took place at Chicago, Illinois on March 25, 1962, this time being two days before the NBA completed their draft. It would also prove to be their final draft in general due to a combination of a failure to persuade top-tier players to join the competing ABL instead of the NBA, financial struggles with the ABL in general, and the notion that one of their teams intended on leaving the ABL to join the NBA instead, which showcased greater instability in mind (especially with a few of the ABL's teams already moving elsewhere following their first season's completion and the Los Angeles Jets later folding before the upcoming season began). Much like last year's draft, each team had two territorial draft picks to select players with, though the Long Beach Chiefs (who were still named the Hawaii Chiefs at the time) could not find any suitable players that fit the territorial distinction this time around, while the Kansas City Steers and Oakland Oaks (known as the San Francisco Saints at the time) could only get one territorial selection at hand. However, unlike last year's draft, which held no known records of rounds for each team in the draft, they did keep record of at least the first round before not keeping record of any other rounds afterward (including the first names of at least two players selected), though there was a known record for Cornell Green going to what could be considered the second round by the Hawaii Chiefs despite him later joining the NFL for the Dallas Cowboys instead. As such, excluding territorial selections, the #1 pick of that year's draft in the ABL would become UCLA's John Green by the Los Angeles Jets, who would later fold operations before their upcoming season began alongside the Cleveland Pipers franchise, with Cleveland folding following their failed attempt to transfer into the NBA.

Territorial Picks

Chicago Majors

- Chet Walker, Bradley University
- Dave DeBusschere, University of Detroit

Cleveland Pipers

- Jerry Lucas, Ohio State University
- John Havlicek, Ohio State University

Hawaii Chiefs

- No players that could be considered eligible were selected there.

Kansas City Steers

- Mike Wroblewski, Kansas State University

Los Angeles Jets

- John Rudometkin, University of Southern California
- Zelmo Beaty, Prairie View A&M College

New York Tapers

- Jack Foley, College of the Holy Cross
- LeRoy Ellis, St. John's University

Pittsburgh Rens

- Len Chappell, Wake Forest College
- Ron Galbreath, Westminster College

San Francisco Saints

- Bill McGill, University of Utah

First round

Round	Pick	Player	Pos.	Nationality	Team	College
1	1	John Green	G	United States	Los Angeles Jets	UCLA (Sr.)
1	2	Chris Appel	G	United States	Hawaii Chiefs	USC (Sr.)
1	3	Bobby Rascoe	G/F	United States	New York Tapers	Western Kentucky (Sr.)
1	4	Don Nelson	SF	United States	Chicago Majors	Iowa (Sr.)
1	5	Paul Hogue	C	United States	San Francisco Saints	Cincinnati (Sr.)
1	6	Garry Roggenburk	SF	United States	Pittsburgh Rens	Dayton (Sr.)
1	7	Terry Dischinger	G/F	United States	Cleveland Pipers	Purdue (Sr.)
1	8	John Windsor	PF	United States	Kansas City Steers	Stanford (Sr.)

Additional Rounds

Chicago Majors

- Bud Olsen, University of Louisville
- Armand Reo, University of Notre Dame
- Jim Hudock, University of North Carolina
- Russ Marvel, North Carolina State College
- Larry Pursiful, University of Kentucky
- Mike Cingiser, Brown University
- Bob Bolton, Western Michigan University
- Alfred Kaemmerling, Princeton University
- Lindberg Moody, South Carolina State College
- Frank Snyder, Memphis State University
- Ralph Wells, Northwestern University
- Bucky Keller, Virginia Polytechnic Institute

Cleveland Pipers

- Hubie White, Villanova University
- Mel Nowell, Ohio State University
- Bill Hanson, University of Washington
- Bob Jones, Georgetown College
- Bruce Drysdale, Temple University
- Redell Walton, Savannah State College
- Chester Moran, Lincoln University
- Clarence Lively, University of Wyoming
- Bob Mahlin, Williams College
- Art Schwarm, Michigan State University
- Billy Packer, Wake Forest College
- Gene Werts, Tennessee A&I University
- Tom Hatton, University of Dayton

Hawaii Chiefs

- Cornell Green, Utah State University
- Charlie Sells, Washington State University
- Ed Bento, Loyola University of Los Angeles
- Porter Meriwether, Tennessee A&I University
- Bill Garner, University of Portland
- Jay Carty, Oregon State University
- Carroll Broussard, Texas A&M College
- Larry Armstrong, Arizona State University
- Thomas Redmon, Prairie View A&M College
- Terry Ball, Washington State University
- Ira Jackson, Savannah State College
- Frank Swopes, Idaho State College

Kansas City Steers

- Jack Thobe, Xavier University
- Del Ray Mounts, Texas Technological College
- Jack Ardon, Tulane University
- Bob Duffy, Colgate University
- Wilky Gilmore, University of Colorado
- Pat McKenzie, Kansas State University
- Harold Hudgens, Texas Technological College
- Vinnie Brewer, Iowa State University
- Mike Bohnet, Ferris Institute
- Ray Goddard, Indiana State College
- Gary Wheeler, Iowa State University
- Cecil Epperly, Oklahoma State University
- Dan Tieman, Villa Madonna College
- Bill Kirvin, Xavier University
- Don Lister, St. Benedict's College
- Howard Montgomery, Pan American College
- Tom Hannon, St. Bonaventure University

Los Angeles Jets

- Harry Williams, California State Polytechnic College
- Glenn Moore, Oregon State University
- Clyde Arnold, Duquesne University
- George Knighton, University of New Mexico
- Darnell Haney, Utah State University
- George Foree, Winston-Salem Teachers College
- Lanny Van Eman, Municipal University of Wichita
- Paul Miller, West Virginia University
- Rally Rounsaville, California State Polytechnic College

New York Tapers

- Wayne Hightower, University of Kansas
- Richie Swartz, Hofstra College
- Marvin Trotman, Elizabeth City State Teachers College
- Jim Hadnot, Providence College

Pittsburgh Rens

- Kevin Loughery, St. John's University
- Granville Williams, Morehead State College
- Mike Rice, Duquesne University
- Walt Kennedy, Florida A&M University
- Ed Noe, Morehead State College
- John Ritter, St. Benedict's College
- Paul Benec, Duquesne University
- Bob McAteer, La Salle College
- Art Whisnant, University of South Carolina
- Gene Harris, Penn State University
- Bill Stromple, Duquesne University

San Francisco Saints

- Charles Hardnett, Grambling College
- Roger Strickland, Jacksonville University
- Jerry Grote, Loyola University of Los Angeles
- Bill Green, Colorado State University
- Bob Gaillard, University of San Francisco
- Charles Warren, University of Oregon
- James Barfield, Jackson State College
- Ken Stanley, University of Southern California
- Gary Daniels, The Citadel Military College
- Ken Stanley, University of the Pacific
- Jeremy Schultz, Owatonna College
- Clarence Winkle, University of Kentucky
- James Oleander, Colorado State University

== Rebirth ==
The Philadelphia Tapers, Kansas City Steers, Hawaii Chiefs, Cleveland Pipers, and the Los Angeles Jets eventually returned to their NABL roots, where they continue as AAU Elite teams.
