= Buckhalter =

Buckhalter is a surname, being an Americanized form of the surname Buchhalter. Notable people with the surname include:

- Correll Buckhalter (born 1978), American former football running back
- Joe Buckhalter (1937–2013), American basketball player

== See also ==
- Lepke Buchalter (1897–1944), American mobster
