= Adrian Smith (basketball) =

American basketball player (1936–2026)

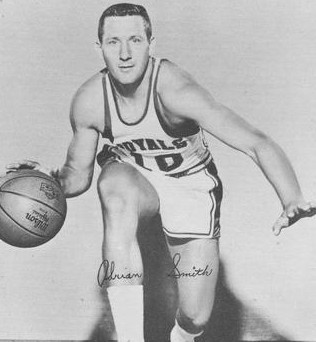

Personal information
- Born: October 5, 1936 Farmington, Kentucky, U.S.
- Died: April 28, 2026 (aged 89)
- Listed height: 6 ft 1 in (1.85 m)
- Listed weight: 180 lb (82 kg)

Career information
- High school: Farmington (Farmington, Kentucky)
- College: Northeast Mississippi CC (1954–1956); Kentucky (1956–1958)
- NBA draft: 1958: 15th round, 85th overall pick
- Drafted by: Cincinnati Royals
- Playing career: 1961–1972
- Position: Point guard
- Number: 10

Career history
- 1959–1960: USAF All-Stars
- 1961: Akron Goodyear Wingfoots
- 1961–1969: Cincinnati Royals
- 1969–1971: San Francisco Warriors
- 1971–1972: Virginia Squires

Career highlights
- NBA All-Star (1966); NBA All-Star Game MVP (1966); NCAA champion (1958)

Career NBA and ABA statistics
- Points: 8,750 (11.3 ppg)
- Rebounds: 1,626 (2.1 rpg)
- Assists: 1,739 (2.3 apg)
- Stats at NBA.com
- Stats at Basketball Reference
Medals
Men's basketball
Representing the United States
Olympic Games
Gold medal – first place	1960 Rome	Team competition
Pan American Games
Gold medal – first place	1959 Chicago

Adrian Howard "Odie" Smith (October 5, 1936 – April 28, 2026) was an American professional basketball player. He played college basketball for Northeast Mississippi Community College and Kentucky, winning the NCAA championship with the later in 1958. Following his college career, he was drafted by the Cincinnati Royals with the 85th pick in the 1958 NBA draft. He joined the Royals in 1961 after serving in the U.S. Army and went on to play 10 seasons in the NBA and one in the ABA. In his lone NBA All-Star appearance in 1966, he was named the All-Star Game MVP.

Smith was a member of the United States national team that won gold at the 1959 Pan American games in Chicago and the 1960 Olympic games in Rome.

== Early life and education ==
Smith was the fifth of six children of Oury and Ruth Smith of Farmington, Kentucky. The family lived in a farmhouse that had no electricity and no indoor plumbing. He was nicknamed "Odie" after a comedian on the Grand Ole Opry. As a child, he attended a three-room schoolhouse in rural Graves County, Kentucky. Because the family didn't have money for a basketball, he learned to shoot one his mother made from rolling up his dad's socks.

He attended Farmington High School, where he nearly didn't play high school basketball until the school's principal and basketball coach agreed to give him a ride home, a distance of seven miles, after practices. As a senior, his only scholarship offer was from nearby Murray State University, but he took too long to accept and the offer was withdrawn.

== College career ==
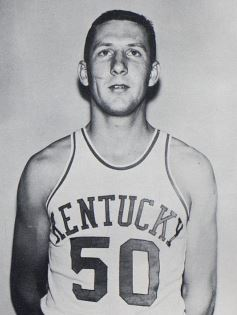
Smith from the 1958 Kentuckian

Smith enrolled to play basketball at Northeast Mississippi Junior College (now known as Northeast Mississippi Community College). After Smith excelled on the court, Northeast coach Bonner Arnold convinced legendary University of Kentucky coach Adolph Rupp to send a scout to see Smith, and UK offered a scholarship.

He didn't see much action his junior season until Kentucky's star guard, Vernon Hatton, went out with an appendectomy, and for seven games, Smith averaged 16.3 points. As a senior, Smith was a starter and averaged 12.4 points per game. The Wildcats' team, known as the "Fiddlin' Five", beat Seattle University 84–72 to win the 1957–58 national championship, led by 30 points from Hatton and 24 from Johnny Cox. Smith averaged just under 14 points in UK's four NCAA tourney wins, including seven in the championship game.

Smith graduated from Kentucky with a business degree.

== After college ==
Smith was selected in the 1958 NBA draft, but not until the 15th round (85th overall) by the Cincinnati Royals.

=== USAF All-Stars (1959–1960) ===
Instead of attempting to make the Royals, Smith joined the U.S. Army, where he played on the Army's All-Star team and in 1960 was selected to play on the eventual undefeated U.S. men's basketball team that won the gold medal in the 1960 Olympics in Rome, Italy. The team went 8–0 in the Olympics, led by future hall-of-famers Oscar Robertson, Jerry Lucas, and Jerry West, although in the opening win against host Italy, Smith was the team's leading scorer, with 17 points scored. The team's average margin of victory in the eight games was 42.4 points per game.

=== Akron Goodyear Wingfoots (1961) ===
Smith played for the Akron Goodyear Wingfoots in 1961.

== Professional career ==
=== Cincinnati Royals (1961–1969) ===
Smith began his professional career in the 1961–62 NBA season. During his first three seasons, he served as a backup guard behind Oscar Robertson and Bucky Bockhorn, averaging about 20 minutes per game with scoring averages of 7.2, 8.9, and 9.4, respectively.

In his fourth season of 1964–65, he became a starter in the Royals' backcourt alongside Robertson. Playing over 34 minutes per game, he averaged 15.1 points per game, with a .456 field goal percentage and .830 free throw percentage.

The 1965–66 season was both his most productive and noteworthy. He averaged a career-high 18.4 points and 3.6 rebounds per game as the Royals went 45–35 and, in the Eastern Division semifinals, extended the Boston Celtics to a fifth and deciding game before falling to the eventual NBA champions. On December 15 he scored a career-high 34 points against the Celtics, and followed that up on January 5 with another career-high of 35 points. During the season, Smith was selected to the 1966 NBA All-Star Game and, surprisingly for a game that including sixteen future Hall-of-Famers, Smith was named MVP after he scored 24 points in 26 minutes. It was his only All-Star appearance, and for winning the MVP award, he received a new Ford Galaxie car.

In his sixth NBA season, 1966–67, Smith averaged 16.6 points per game and led the NBA with a .903 free throw percentage and, for the fourth time, the durable Smith led the league in games played. In 1967–68, Smith averaged 15.6 points per game in his last year as a starter. In 1968–69, playing primarily as a backup to Robertson and Tom Van Arsdale, Smith averaged 9.6 ponts per game.

=== San Francisco Warriors (1969–1971) ===
In the 1969–70 season, after 32 games with the Royals, Smith was traded to the San Francisco Warriors, for whom he played another 45 games, averaging 5.9 points per game for the season. In 1970–71, his 10th NBA season, he played only 21 games, averaging 5.3 points per game in his final NBA season.

=== Virginia Squires (1971–1972) ===
Smith played for the American Basketball Association's Virginia Squires in 1971–72, averaging 5.1 points per game. He also played 13 times for the United States.

== Later life and death ==
Smith worked for many years as a commercial relationship manager for Cincinnati-based Fifth Third Bank, where he was a vice president. He resided in Cincinnati with his wife, Paula, and he still owned the Ford Galaxie he won from the 1966 NBA All-Star Game.

Smith died on April 28, 2026, at the age of 89.

== Honors ==
The entire 1960 USA Olympic basketball team, including Smith, was inducted into the Naismith Memorial Basketball Hall of Fame on August 13, 2010. Smith is also a member of the Northeast Mississippi Community College Sports Hall of Fame and the Mississippi Community College Sports Hall of Fame.

== NBA/ABA career statistics ==
Legend
GP	Games played	GS	Games started	MPG	Minutes per game
FG%	Field goal percentage	3P%	3-point field goal percentage	FT%	Free throw percentage
RPG	Rebounds per game	APG	Assists per game	SPG	Steals per game
BPG	Blocks per game	PPG	Points per game	**Bold**	Career high

*	Led the league

=== Regular season ===
Year	Team	GP	MPG	FG%	FT%	RPG	APG	PPG
1961–62	Cincinnati	80	18.3	.405	.775	1.9	2.1	7.2
1962–63	Cincinnati	79	19.3	.443	.811	2.2	1.8	8.9
1963–64	Cincinnati	66	23.1	.406	.782	2.2	2.2	9.4
1964–65	Cincinnati	80	34.3	.456	.830	2.8	3.0	15.1
1965–66	Cincinnati	80	**37.3**	.405	.850	**3.6**	3.2	**18.4**
1966–67	Cincinnati	81	32.5	.438	.903*	2.5	2.3	16.6
1967–68	Cincinnati	**82**	33.9	**.464**	.829	2.3	**3.3**	15.6
1968–69	Cincinnati	73	18.3	.432	.807	1.4	1.7	9.6
1969–70	Cincinnati	32	14.2	.405	.867	1.0	1.4	5.4
1969–70	San Francisco	45	14.1	.347	**.909**	1.1	1.9	6.4
1970–71	San Francisco	21	11.8	.427	.854	1.1	1.4	5.3
1971–72	Virginia (ABA)	53	12.9	.446	.893	.9	.8	5.1
Career		772	24.6	.430	.838	2.1	2.3	11.3

=== Playoffs ===
Year	Team	GP	MPG	FG%	FT%	RPG	APG	PPG
1962	Cincinnati	4	13.3	.421	**1.000**	1.3	.8	5.3
1963	Cincinnati	**12**	16.7	.402	.705	1.3	2.3	8.1
1964	Cincinnati	7	9.4	.308	.714	1.3	.6	3.0
1965	Cincinnati	4	**37.5**	.375	.955	**2.8**	**5.3**	**14.3**
1966	Cincinnati	5	31.4	.373	.955*	2.4	2.6	13.0
1967	Cincinnati	4	30.0	.375	.750	2.0	2.8	11.3
1972	Virginia (ABA)	11	27.0	**.465**	.865	1.7	1.5	11.4
Career		47	22.2	.402	.832	1.7	2.1	9.2
