= Hub Reed =

American basketball player (1934–2024)

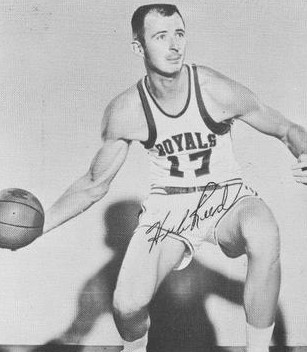

Personal information
- Born: October 4, 1936 Harrah, Oklahoma, U.S.
- Died: May 28, 2024 (aged 87) Shawnee, Oklahoma, U.S.
- Listed height: 6 ft 9 in (2.06 m)
- Listed weight: 215 lb (98 kg)

Career information
- High school: Capitol Hill (Oklahoma City, Oklahoma)
- College: Oklahoma City (1955–1958)
- NBA draft: 1958: 2nd round, 14th overall pick
- Drafted by: St. Louis Hawks
- Playing career: 1958–1965
- Position: Power forward / center
- Number: 12, 19, 26, 51, 14, 20, 23

Career history
- 1958–1960: St. Louis Hawks
- 1960–1963: Cincinnati Royals
- 1963–1964: Los Angeles Lakers
- 1964–1965: Detroit Pistons

Career NBA statistics
- Points: 2,618 (5.5 ppg)
- Rebounds: 2,449 (5.1 rpg)
- Assists: 367 (0.8 apg)
- Stats at NBA.com
- Stats at Basketball Reference

Hubert F. Reed (October 4, 1936 – May 28, 2024) was an American professional basketball player born in Harrah, Oklahoma.

A 6 ft 9 in (2.06 m) center from Oklahoma City University under coach Abe Lemons, Reed played in the National Basketball Association (NBA) from 1958 to 1965 as a member of the St. Louis Hawks, Cincinnati Royals, Los Angeles Lakers, and Detroit Pistons. He averaged 5.5 points and 5.1 rebounds over his career.

Reed died in Shawnee, Oklahoma, on May 28, 2024, at the age of 89.

== Career statistics ==
Legend
GP	Games played	GS	Games started	MPG	Minutes per game
FG%	Field goal percentage	3P%	3-point field goal percentage	FT%	Free throw percentage
RPG	Rebounds per game	APG	Assists per game	SPG	Steals per game
BPG	Blocks per game	PPG	Points per game	**Bold**	Career high
*	Led the league

=== NBA ===
==== Regular season ====
Year	Team	GP	MPG	FG%	FT%	RPG	APG	PPG
1958–59	St. Louis	65	14.6	.429	.746	4.9	.5	5.0
1959–60	St. Louis	2	8.5	.333	–	1.0	.0	1.0
1959–60	Cincinnati	69	**26.1**	.450	.728	**8.9**	**1.0**	**9.7**
1960–61	Cincinnati	75	16.2	.429	.697	4.9	.9	5.3
1961–62	Cincinnati	**80***	18.1	.441	.732	5.5	.7	5.8
1962–63	Cincinnati	**80***	16.2	**.466**	**.755**	5.0	**1.0**	5.9
1963–64	L.A. Lakers	46	8.4	.363	.667	2.3	.5	1.7
1964–65	Detroit	62	12.1	.380	.690	3.3	.6	3.4
Career		479	16.4	.436	.724	5.1	.8	5.5

==== Playoffs ====
Year	Team	GP	MPG	FG%	FT%	RPG	APG	PPG
1959	St. Louis	4	12.0	.364	.500	4.3	.3	2.8
1962	Cincinnati	4	**17.3**	.429	.750	5.0	**1.3**	5.3
1963	Cincinnati	**12**	15.8	.400	**.833**	**5.3**	.8	**5.9**
1964	L.A. Lakers	1	12.0	**.500**	.000	2.0	.0	4.0
Career		21	15.2	.406	.700	4.9	.8	5.1
