= Jennie Gomarlo =

American politician

Member of the New Hampshire House of Representatives from the Cheshire 12 district
- In office December 5, 2018 – December 7, 2022
- Preceded by: Jim McConnell

Personal details
- Party: Democratic
- Education: Monadnock Regional High School; Keene State College

Jennie Gomarlo is a New Hampshire politician.

== Education ==
Gomarlo graduated from Monadnock Regional High School. Later, Gomarlo earned a BS in industrial chemistry from Keene State College.

== Career ==
Gomarlo has been the owner and bookkeeper of Gomarlo's Inc. since 1990. On November 6, 2018, Gomarlo was elected to the New Hampshire House of Representatives where she represents the Cheshire 12 district. She assumed office on December 5, 2018. She is a Democrat.

== Personal life ==
Gomarlo resides in Swanzey, New Hampshire. Gomarlo is married to Michael and has two children.
