= Joe Buckhalter =

American basketball player

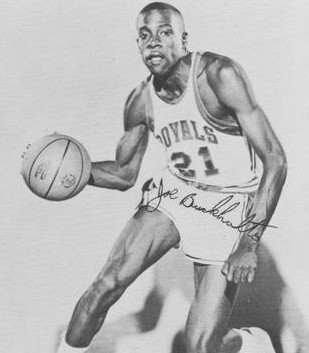

Personal information
- Born: August 1, 1937
- Died: December 30, 2013 (aged 76) Cincinnati, Ohio, U.S.
- Listed height: 6 ft 7 in (2.01 m)
- Listed weight: 210 lb (95 kg)

Career information
- High school: Tilden (Chicago, Illinois)
- College: Tennessee State (1956–1958)
- NBA draft: 1958: 12th round, 81st overall pick
- Drafted by: St. Louis Hawks
- Playing career: 1961–1964
- Position: Power forward
- Number: 21

Career history
- 1961–1963: Cincinnati Royals
- 1963–1964: Wilkes-Barre Barons

Career NBA statistics
- Points: 375 (5.8 ppg)
- Rebounds: 265 (4.1 rpg)
- Assists: 43 (0.7 apg)
- Stats at NBA.com
- Stats at Basketball Reference

Joseph A. Buckhalter Jr. (August 1, 1937 – December 30, 2013) was an American retired basketball player.

He played collegiately for Tennessee State University.

He was selected by the St. Louis Hawks in the 12th round (81st pick overall) of the 1958 NBA draft.

He played for the Cincinnati Royals (1961–63) in the NBA.

He also played with the Harlem Globetrotters.

== Career statistics ==
Legend
GP	Games played	GS	Games started	MPG	Minutes per game
FG%	Field goal percentage	3P%	3-point field goal percentage	FT%	Free throw percentage
RPG	Rebounds per game	APG	Assists per game	SPG	Steals per game
BPG	Blocks per game	PPG	Points per game	**Bold**	Career high

=== NBA ===
==== Regular season ====
Year	Team	GP	MPG	FG%	FT%	RPG	APG	PPG
1961–62	Cincinnati	**63**	**11.6**	**.458**	.620	**4.2**	**.7**	**5.9**
1962–63	Cincinnati	2	6.0	.000	**1.000**	1.5	.0	1.0
Career		65	11.4	.451	.627	4.1	.7	5.8

=== Playoffs ===
Year	Team	GP	MPG	FG%	FT%	RPG	APG	PPG
1962	Cincinnati	4	15.0	.421	.667	5.5	1.0	8.5
