= Danny Doyle (basketball) =

American basketball player (born 1940)

Personal information
- Born: February 6, 1940 (age 86) Long Island City, New York, U.S.
- Listed height: 6 ft 8 in (2.03 m)
- Listed weight: 200 lb (91 kg)

Career information
- High school: William Cullen Bryant (Queens, New York)
- College: Belmont Abbey (1958–1961)
- NBA draft: 1961: 5th round, 44th overall pick
- Drafted by: Detroit Pistons
- Playing career: 1961–1966
- Position: Power forward
- Number: 14

Career history
- 1961–1962: Pittsburgh Rens
- 1962: Detroit Pistons
- 1962–1963: Trenton Colonials
- 1965–1966: Harlem Wizards
- Stats at NBA.com
- Stats at Basketball Reference

Daniel F. Doyle (February 6, 1940) is an American former professional basketball player. He played for the NBA's Detroit Pistons in four games early into the 1962–63 season and recorded 16 total points.

== Career statistics ==
Legend
GP	Games played	GS	Games started	MPG	Minutes per game
FG%	Field goal percentage	3P%	3-point field goal percentage	FT%	Free throw percentage
RPG	Rebounds per game	APG	Assists per game	SPG	Steals per game
BPG	Blocks per game	PPG	Points per game	**Bold**	Career high

=== NBA ===
==== Regular season ====
Year	Team	GP	MPG	FG%	FT%	RPG	APG	PPG
1962–63	Detroit	4	6.3	.500	.800	2.0	.8	4.0
