= Bob Wiesenhahn =

American basketball player (born 1938)

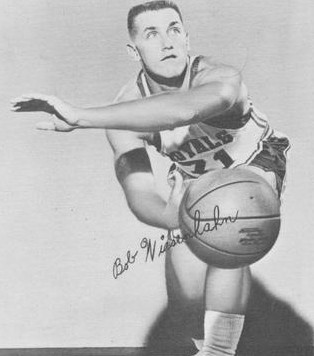

Personal information
- Born: December 22, 1938 (age 87)
- Listed height: 6 ft 4 in (1.93 m)
- Listed weight: 215 lb (98 kg)

Career information
- High school: Archbishop McNicholas (Cincinnati, Ohio)
- College: Cincinnati (1958–1961)
- NBA draft: 1961: 2nd round, 11th overall pick
- Drafted by: Cincinnati Royals
- Playing career: 1961–1963
- Position: Small forward
- Number: 71

Career history
- 1961–1962: Cincinnati Royals
- 1962–1963: Pittsburgh Rens

Career highlights
- NCAA champion (1961)

Career NBA statistics
- Points: 119 (2.0 ppg)
- Rebounds: 112 (1.9 rpg)
- Assists: 33 (0.4 apg)
- Stats at NBA.com
- Stats at Basketball Reference

Robert B. Wiesenhahn Jr. (born December 22, 1938) is an American former professional basketball player.

== Early life ==
Wiesenhahn attended McNicholas High School in Cincinnati. He played basketball for the Rockets and graduated in 1957.

== College career ==
Wiesenhahn played college basketball at the University of Cincinnati.

As a sophomore in 1958–59, Wiesenhahn was a starting forward on the nationally ranked team led by Oscar Robertson. Wiesenhahn averaged 6.2 points and 6.4 rebounds per game as the 26–4 Bearcats won the Missouri Valley Conference (MVC) title and advanced to the NCAA Final Four, where they finished in third place nationally.

As a junior in 1959–60, Wiesenhahn averaged 7.5 points and 6.8 rebounds per game. The Bearcats posted a 28–2 record, won the MVC title and again advanced to the Final Four, but they again had to settle for third place.

In 1961 as a senior, Wiesenhahn led the Bearcats with 17.1 points per game to go with a .481 field goal percentage and 10.0 rebounds per game as Cincinnati posted a 27–3 record and again captured the MVC crown. the Bearcats advanced to the NCAA national championship game against Ohio State, and Wiesenhahn would be guarding future Hall-of-Famer John Havlicek. The hard-nosed, defensive-minded Wiesenhahn outscored Havlicek 17 points to four and outrebounded him nine to four. The Bearcats, led by starters Wiesenhahn, Tom Thacker, Tony Yates, Paul Hogue, and Carl Bouldin, defeated the heavily favored Buckeyes, 71–65 in overtime to claim the national crown. Wiesenhahn was named to the All-MVC team and was named first-team All-American by the Helms Foundation and by Converse.

== Professional career ==
A 6'4", 220 lb. forward, Wiesenhahn was selected in the second round (11th overall) of the 1961 NBA draft by the Cincinnati Royals. He played one season, 1961–62, for the 43–37 Royals, and in 60 games he averaged 2.0 points and 1.9 rebounds per game.

The next season, 1962–63, he played for the American Basketball League, but the league folded in December 1962. Because of Wiesenhahn's build, athleticism and reputation for hard-nosed play, even though he never played college football, he was offered a tryout by coach George Halas and the NFL's Chicago Bears. However, with no financial guarantee and married with two children, Wiesenhahn passed on the offer.

== Personal life ==
In 1987, Wiesenhahn was inducted into the University of Cincinnati Athletics Hall of Fame. He is also a member of the McNicholas High School Athletic Hall of Fame.

In 2014 at age 75 he continues to work out regularly and closely follows local high school basketball as well as college and NBA basketball. He has two sons and two daughters.

== Career statistics ==
Legend
| GP | Games played | GS | Games started | MPG | Minutes per game |
| FG% | Field goal percentage | 3P% | 3-point field goal percentage | FT% | Free throw percentage |
| RPG | Rebounds per game | APG | Assists per game | SPG | Steals per game |
| BPG | Blocks per game | PPG | Points per game | **Bold** | Career high |

=== NBA ===
==== Regular season ====
| Year | Team | GP | MPG | FG% | FT% | RPG | APG | PPG |
|---|---|---|---|---|---|---|---|---|
| 1961–62 | Cincinnati | 60 | 5.4 | .317 | .567 | 1.9 | .4 | 2.0 |

==== Playoffs ====
| Year | Team | GP | MPG | FG% | FT% | RPG | APG | PPG |
|---|---|---|---|---|---|---|---|---|
| 1962 | Cincinnati | 2 | 3.0 | .250 | 1.000 | 1.0 | .0 | 1.5 |
