= Dave Zeller =

American basketball player (1939–2020)

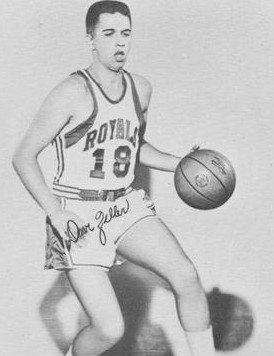

Personal information
- Born: June 8, 1939 Springfield, Ohio, U.S.
- Died: September 2, 2020 (aged 81) Toledo, Ohio, U.S.
- Listed height: 6 ft 1 in (1.85 m)
- Listed weight: 175 lb (79 kg)

Career information
- High school: Tecumseh (New Carlisle, Ohio)
- College: Miami (Ohio) (1958–1961)
- NBA draft: 1961: 7th round, 61st overall pick
- Drafted by: Cincinnati Royals
- Position: Point guard
- Number: 18

Career history
- 1961–1962: Cincinnati Royals

Career highlights
- First-team All-MAC (1961)
- Stats at NBA.com
- Stats at Basketball Reference

David A. Zeller (June 8, 1939 – September 2, 2020) was an American professional basketball player. He played college basketball for the Miami RedHawks and played in the National Basketball Association for the Cincinnati Royals. In 61 career games, he averaged 4.6 minutes and 1.5 points per game.

== Career statistics ==
Legend
GP	Games played	GS	Games started	MPG	Minutes per game
FG%	Field goal percentage	3P%	3-point field goal percentage	FT%	Free throw percentage
RPG	Rebounds per game	APG	Assists per game	SPG	Steals per game
BPG	Blocks per game	PPG	Points per game	**Bold**	Career high

=== NBA ===
==== Regular season ====
Year	Team	GP	MPG	FG%	FT%	RPG	APG	PPG
1961–62	Cincinnati	61	4.6	.353	.750	.4	1.0	1.5

=== Playoffs ===
Year	Team	GP	MPG	FG%	FT%	RPG	APG	PPG
1962	Cincinnati	2	2.5	.500	–	.5	.5	1.0
