= Ted Luckenbill =

American basketball player

Personal information
- Born: July 27, 1939 Elkhart, Indiana, U.S.
- Died: June 24, 2012 (aged 72) Dallas, Texas, U.S.
- Listed height: 6 ft 6 in (1.98 m)
- Listed weight: 205 lb (93 kg)

Career information
- High school: Elkhart (Elkhart, Indiana)
- College: Houston (1958–1961)
- NBA draft: 1961: 2nd round, 15th overall pick
- Drafted by: Philadelphia Warriors
- Playing career: 1961–1964
- Position: Small forward
- Number: 12

Career history
- 1961–1963: Philadelphia / San Francisco Warriors
- 1963–1964: Wilkes-Barre Barons

Career highlights
- All-EPBL Second Team (1963)

Career NBA statistics
- Points: 196 (2.3 ppg)
- Rebounds: 166 (1.9 rpg)
- Assists: 35 (0.4 apg)
- Stats at NBA.com
- Stats at Basketball Reference

Theodore Ray Luckenbill (July 27, 1939 – June 24, 2012) was an American professional basketball player. He spent two seasons (1961–1963) in the National Basketball Association (NBA).

A 6'6" forward who attended Elkhart High School and the University of Houston, Luckenbill was selected by the Philadelphia Warriors in the 1961 NBA draft. He would later play in Wilt Chamberlain's 100-point game.

Luckenbill played for the Wilkes-Barre Barons of the Eastern Professional Basketball League (EPBL) from 1963 to 1964. He was selected to the All-EPBL Second Team in 1963.

Luckenbill died in Dallas, Texas on June 24, 2012, at age 72 from cancer.

== Career statistics ==
Legend
GP	Games played	GS	Games started	MPG	Minutes per game
FG%	Field goal percentage	3P%	3-point field goal percentage	FT%	Free throw percentage
RPG	Rebounds per game	APG	Assists per game	SPG	Steals per game
BPG	Blocks per game	PPG	Points per game	**Bold**	Career high

=== NBA ===
==== Regular season ====
Year	Team	GP	MPG	FG%	FT%	RPG	APG	PPG
1961–62	Philadelphia	**67**	5.9	.358	**.645**	1.6	**.4**	2.0
1962–63	San Francisco	20	**10.1**	**.382**	.450	**2.8**	**.4**	**3.1**
Career		87	6.9	.367	.604	1.9	.4	2.3

=== Playoffs ===
Year	Team	GP	MPG	FG%	FT%	RPG	APG	PPG
1962	Philadelphia	4	4.3	.000	.400	.8	.3	.5
