= Jimmy Smith (basketball, born 1934) =

American basketball player and political activist

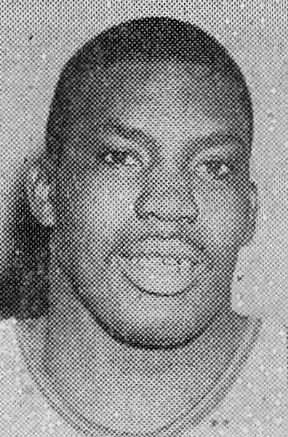
- Smith, circa 1960

Personal information
- Born: December 6, 1934 Pittsburgh, Pennsylvania, U.S.
- Died: May 5, 2002 (aged 67) Harrisburg, Pennsylvania, U.S.
- Listed height: 6 ft 6 in (1.98 m)
- Listed weight: 230 lb (104 kg)

Career information
- High school: Allderdice (Pittsburgh, Pennsylvania); Homestead (Homestead, Pennsylvania)
- College: Franciscan (1954–1958)
- NBA draft: 1958: 2nd round, 15th overall pick
- Drafted by: Boston Celtics
- Position: Power forward

Career highlights
- 2× Second-team All-American – NEA (1957, 1958)
- Stats at Basketball Reference

James William Smith-Betsil (December 12, 1934 – May 5, 2002) was an American basketball player and political activist. He was an All-American college player at the College of Steubenville (now Franciscan University of Steubenville) and was a second-round pick in the 1958 NBA draft.

Smith was born James Betsil and played his first two years of high school basketball at Taylor Allderdice High School in Pittsburgh, Pennsylvania. During the Summer before his junior year, he transferred to Homestead High School in Homestead, Pennsylvania. He made the move largely to increase his chances of playing college basketball, going so far as to move in with a local family (who became his legal guardians) and legally changing his name to James Smith. Following his high school career, Smith went to Steubenville for college, becoming perhaps the greatest player in school history. He was twice named an All-American, averaged over 20 rebounds per game and scored 2,048 points for his career.

Following the close of his college career, Smith was drafted in the second round of the 1958 NBA draft (15th pick overall) by the Boston Celtics. However, he was drafted into the United States Army as well. Smith was discharged in 1960 due to knee problems, injuries that ultimately derailed his professional basketball career. Smith ultimately became an activist for racial integration and later a public servant. He died on May 5, 2002, due to complications from leukemia.
