= Howie Carl =

American basketball player

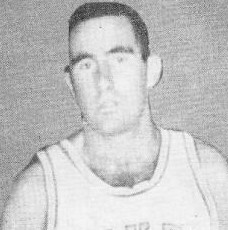
- Carl in 1962

Personal information
- Born: June 7, 1938 Chicago, Illinois, U.S.
- Died: October 24, 2005 (aged 67) Glenview, Illinois, U.S.
- Listed height: 5 ft 9 in (1.75 m)
- Listed weight: 160 lb (73 kg)

Career information
- High school: Von Steuben (Chicago, Illinois)
- College: DePaul (1958–1961)
- NBA draft: 1961: 5th round, 50th overall pick
- Drafted by: Chicago Packers
- Playing career: 1961–1962
- Position: Point guard
- Number: 10

Career history
- 1961–1962: Chicago Packers

Career NBA statistics
- Points: 170 (5.5 ppg)
- Rebounds: 39 (1.3 rpg)
- Assists: 57 (1.8 apg)
- Stats at NBA.com
- Stats at Basketball Reference

Howard Hershey Carl (June 7, 1938 – October 24, 2005) was an American basketball player.

Born in Chicago, Illinois, he played collegiately for DePaul University.

He was selected by the Chicago Packers in the 5th round (50th pick overall) of the 1961 NBA draft.

He played for the Packers (1961–62) in the NBA for 31 games.

== Career statistics ==
Legend
GP	Games played	GS	Games started	MPG	Minutes per game
FG%	Field goal percentage	3P%	3-point field goal percentage	FT%	Free throw percentage
RPG	Rebounds per game	APG	Assists per game	SPG	Steals per game
BPG	Blocks per game	PPG	Points per game	**Bold**	Career high

=== NBA ===
==== Regular season ====
Year	Team	GP	MPG	FG%	FT%	RPG	APG	PPG
1961–62	Chicago	31	12.3	.333	.706	1.3	1.8	5.5

== See also ==
- List of shortest players in National Basketball Association history
