= Jerry Graves =

American basketball player (1938–2021)

Personal information
- Born: September 12, 1938 Lexington, Tennessee, U.S.
- Died: February 7, 2021 (aged 82) Jackson, Tennessee, U.S.
- Listed height: 6 ft 6 in (1.98 m)
- Listed weight: 190 lb (86 kg)

Career information
- High school: Lexington (Lexington, Tennessee)
- College: Mississippi State (1958–1961)
- NBA draft: 1961: 2nd round, 19th overall pick
- Drafted by: Chicago Packers
- Position: Forward

Career highlights
- 2× First-team All-SEC (1960, 1961)
- Stats at Basketball Reference

Jerry Lynn Graves (September 12, 1938 – February 7, 2021) was an American basketball player. He was banned from the National Basketball Association (NBA) for his involvement in the 1961 college basketball point shaving scandal during his senior season playing for the Mississippi State Bulldogs.

Graves played at Lexington High School in his hometown of Lexington, Tennessee, where he set a state record for points scored in a season with 1,156 during his senior year. Graves played college basketball for the Mississippi State Bulldogs from 1958 to 1961 and was a two-time first-team All-Southeastern Conference (SEC) selection. He was voted "Mr. Mississippi State" as the university's most popular student in 1960 and led the Bulldogs to the SEC regular season championship in 1961.

Graves was selected by the newly-formed Chicago Packers as the 19th overall pick in the 1961 NBA draft but elected to sign with the Chicago Majors of the American Basketball League (ABL). On April 27, 1961, he was alleged to have been involved in a point shaving scandal during his senior season. He refused the allegation and said he "played [his] best for Coach McCarthy in every game". However, Graves admitted that he accepted $4,750 in bribes from gamblers who bet on Bulldogs games and paid him if he won. He was expelled from Mississippi State University and banned from the NBA.

Graves worked as a teacher, principal, coach and superintendent for 42 years.

== See also ==
- List of people banned or suspended by the NBA
