= Lexington High School (Tennessee) =

Coordinates: 35.658°N 88.388°W

Location
- 284 White Street; Lexington, (Henderson County), Tennessee 38351; United States

Information
- Type: Public high school
- Principal: Brandon Rainey
- Staff: 49.50 (FTE)
- Enrollment: 922 (2023-2024)
- Student to teacher ratio: 18.63
- Colors: Red and white
- Nickname: Tigers

Lexington High School is a grade 9–12 high school in Lexington, Tennessee. The school's enrollment is roughly 1,000 students.

== Academics ==
Jackson State Community College offers some AP classes on-campus, as well as off-campus classes, including English Language, English Literature, and Calculus.

== Extra-curricular activities ==
Clubs include Future Farmers of America (FFA), Family, Career, and Community Leaders of America FCCLA, Student Council, Air Force JROTC, and Renaissance. LHS also has a marching band, cheerleading squad, dance team, BETA, tennis, volleyball, soccer, baseball, football, basketball, and a yearbook staff.

== Sports ==
Girls' sports include volleyball, golf, basketball, cross country, track, softball, dance team, tennis, and cheerleading. Boys' sports include golf, football, basketball, soccer, cross country, track & field, tennis, and baseball.

Lexington football team has a tradition of excellence. In 2005, the team finished the regular season undefeated and went on to win their first 12 games of the season before losing to David Lipscomb in the quarterfinals of the 3A playoffs. Also went undefeated in 2011 regular season.

Lexington's golf team won the TSSAA State Championship in 2003. In 2004, the golf team finished 5th at State. The Lexington Baseball team won the TSSAA State Championship in 2002. Steve Sweat was player of the year in AA. Jason Patterson was coach of the year in the state for AA.

== Notable alumni ==
- Jerry Graves – All-American Basketball Player from 1955 to 1957, Went on to play at Mississippi State
- James Dale Todd – US District Court Judge for Western Tennessee 1985–2008.
- S. Thomas Anderson – US District Court Judge for Western Tennessee 2008–present.
