= 1961–62 Cincinnati Royals season =

NBA professional basketball team season

- Head coach: Charles Wolf
- Owners: Thomas E. Woods estate
- Arena: Cincinnati Gardens

Results
- Record: 43–37 (.538)
- Place: Division: 2nd (Western)
- Playoff finish: Division semifinals (lost to Pistons 1–3)

Local media
- Television: WKRC-TV
- Radio: WKRC

The 1961/62 season was the Royals 14th season in the NBA and its fifth in Cincinnati. Oscar Robertson had a career season as he averaged a triple double on the season. All 5 starters on the Royals averaged double digits points per games as the team ended a 4-year playoff drought. The Royals had a record of 43–37 and the improving team finished in 2nd place. Despite that, the NBA team had real local competition for fans in The Queen City due to remarkably successful college teams there. The starting five of the team had improved, with Bob Boozer improving to join solid holdovers Oscar Robertson, Jack Twyman, Wayne Embry, Arlen Bockhorn. In the playoffs, the Royals dealt with injuries and would be defeated by the Detroit Pistons in 4 games.

== Roster ==
1961–62 Cincinnati Royals roster
Players

Pos.	No.	Player	Height	Weight	DOB	From
SG	11	Arlen Bockhorn	6 ft 4 in (1.93 m)	200 lb (91 kg)	1933–07–08	Dayton
PF	13	Bob Boozer	6 ft 8 in (2.03 m)	215 lb (98 kg)	1937–04–26	Kansas State
PF	21	Joe Buckhalter	6 ft 7 in (2.01 m)	210 lb (95 kg)	1937–08–01	Tennessee State
C	15	Wayne Embry	6 ft 8 in (2.03 m)	240 lb (109 kg)	1937–03–26	Miami (OH)
C	61	Bevo Nordmann	6 ft 10 in (2.08 m)	225 lb (102 kg)	1939–12–11	Saint Louis
C	51	Hub Reed	6 ft 9 in (2.06 m)	215 lb (98 kg)	1936–10–04	Oklahoma City
PG	14	Oscar Robertson	6 ft 5 in (1.96 m)	205 lb (93 kg)	1938–11–24	Cincinnati
SG	10	Adrian Smith	6 ft 1 in (1.85 m)	180 lb (82 kg)	1936–10–05	Kentucky
SF	31	Jack Twyman	6 ft 6 in (1.98 m)	210 lb (95 kg)	1934–05–11	Cincinnati
SF	71	Bob Wiesenhahn	6 ft 4 in (1.93 m)	215 lb (98 kg)	1938–12–22	Cincinnati
PG	18	Dave Zeller	6 ft 1 in (1.85 m)	175 lb (79 kg)	1939–06–08	Miami (OH)

Coaches
Head coach
- Charles Wolf

Legend
- (DP) Unsigned draft pick
- (FA) Free agent
- (S) Suspended
- Injured

Roster

== Regular season ==
=== Season standings ===
Western Division	W	L	PCT	GB	Home	Road	Neutral	Div
x-Los Angeles Lakers	54	26	.675	–	26–5	18–13	10–8	33–13
x-Cincinnati Royals	43	37	.538	11	18–13	14–16	11–8	29–17
x-Detroit Pistons	37	43	.463	17	16–14	8–17	13–12	24–22
St. Louis Hawks	29	51	.363	25	19–16	7–27	3–8	16–30
Chicago Packers	18	62	.225	36	15-23	3-39	0–0	10–30

=== Game log ===
1961–62 game log
#	Date	Opponent	Score	High points	Record
1	October 21	@ St. Louis	138–129	Jack Twyman (39)	1–0
2	October 24	N Los Angeles	124–122	Oscar Robertson (32)	1–1
3	October 26	@ New York	117–120	Oscar Robertson (30)	1–2
4	October 29	Syracuse	132–139	Jack Twyman (31)	2–2
5	October 31	N New York	131–127	Oscar Robertson (37)	2–3
6	November 1	@ Los Angeles	115–120	Jack Twyman (35)	2–4
7	November 3	@ Los Angeles	132–114	Oscar Robertson (31)	3–4
8	November 7	New York	98–123	Jack Twyman (26)	4–4
9	November 10	Chicago	117–122	Oscar Robertson (40)	5–4
10	November 11	@ Chicago	117–107	Wayne Embry (32)	6–4
11	November 12	St. Louis	126–136	Robertson, Twyman (31)	7–4
12	November 14	N Syracuse	115–119	Oscar Robertson (36)	8–4
13	November 15	@ Philadelphia	133–145	Oscar Robertson (49)	8–5
14	November 16	Boston	127–121	Jack Twyman (29)	8–6
15	November 18	@ St. Louis	133–136	Oscar Robertson (37)	8–7
16	November 19	N Detroit	112–128	Jack Twyman (32)	9–7
17	November 21	Philadelphia	125–118	Wayne Embry (26)	9–8
18	November 23	N Syracuse	117–99	Oscar Robertson (20)	9–9
19	November 24	@ Syracuse	127–125	Wayne Embry (32)	10–9
20	November 26	Los Angeles	102–117	Oscar Robertson (24)	11–9
21	November 28	@ New York	131–117	Oscar Robertson (31)	12–9
22	November 29	Syracuse	136–122	Wayne Embry (33)	12–10
23	November 30	N Boston	133–130	Oscar Robertson (33)	13–10
24	December 3	Boston	119–96	Oscar Robertson (28)	13–11
25	December 6	N Boston	102–103	Oscar Robertson (31)	13–12
26	December 8	St. Louis	123–128	Jack Twyman (34)	14–12
27	December 10	New York	94–134	Jack Twyman (38)	15–12
28	December 11	N Chicago	133–117	Oscar Robertson (32)	16–12
29	December 13	@ Syracuse	136–126	Jack Twyman (31)	17–12
30	December 14	Detroit	107–103	Oscar Robertson (39)	17–13
31	December 16	@ Detroit	121–110	Oscar Robertson (27)	18–13
32	December 19	Philadelphia	117–110	Oscar Robertson (28)	18–14
33	December 23	N Detroit	134–125	Oscar Robertson (35)	18–15
34	December 25	Los Angeles	141–127	Oscar Robertson (40)	18–16
35	December 26	@ St. Louis	129–118	Oscar Robertson (29)	19–16
36	December 27	St. Louis	117–142	Jack Twyman (34)	20–16
37	December 29	Detroit	131–116	Oscar Robertson (38)	20–17
38	December 30	N New York	123–119	Jack Twyman (26)	20–18
39	January 1	Syracuse	110–106	Jack Twyman (28)	20–19
40	January 3	N New York	111–122	Jack Twyman (34)	21–19
41	January 5	Boston	124–103	Oscar Robertson (27)	21–20
42	January 7	N Chicago	123–113	Wayne Embry (30)	22–20
43	January 9	N Chicago	113–106	Oscar Robertson (33)	23–20
44	January 11	Philadelphia	128–145	Oscar Robertson (38)	24–20
45	January 12	@ Boston	125–141	Oscar Robertson (33)	24–21
46	January 13	@ Detroit	119–112	Oscar Robertson (39)	25–21
47	January 14	St. Louis	114–119	Oscar Robertson (36)	26–21
48	January 18	@ Philadelphia	151–133	Oscar Robertson (28)	27–21
49	January 20	Los Angeles	124–125	Oscar Robertson (39)	28–21
50	January 22	N Detroit	106–115	Oscar Robertson (29)	29–21
51	January 24	@ Los Angeles	123–136	Oscar Robertson (32)	29–22
52	January 25	@ Los Angeles	112–116	Oscar Robertson (33)	29–23
53	January 28	Syracuse	131–139	Jack Twyman (29)	30–23
54	January 30	@ St. Louis	131–121	Oscar Robertson (36)	31–23
55	February 1	@ Philadelphia	109–130	Oscar Robertson (21)	31–24
56	February 2	@ Boston	124–143	Oscar Robertson (34)	31–25
57	February 3	@ New York	110–121	Jack Twyman (26)	31–26
58	February 5	N Los Angeles	134–128 (OT)	Oscar Robertson (30)	31–27
59	February 6	Detroit	119–118	Oscar Robertson (47)	31–28
60	February 7	@ Detroit	107–113	Oscar Robertson (28)	31–29
61	February 8	N Los Angeles	109–113	Oscar Robertson (38)	32–29
62	February 10	St. Louis	118–134	Oscar Robertson (32)	33–29
63	February 11	@ St. Louis	109–129	Oscar Robertson (33)	33–30
64	February 13	Philadelphia	132–152	Oscar Robertson (42)	34–30
65	February 14	N Chicago	121–125	Jack Twyman (28)	34–31
66	February 16	@ Philadelphia	132–136	Oscar Robertson (40)	34–32
67	February 17	Detroit	123–113	Oscar Robertson (30)	34–33
68	February 18	N Chicago	138–121	Oscar Robertson (30)	35–33
69	February 20	St. Louis	109–129	Oscar Robertson (31)	36–33
70	February 21	@ Chicago	153–125	Arlen Bockhorn (25)	37–33
71	February 23	@ Detroit	134–120	Oscar Robertson (39)	38–33
72	February 24	Los Angeles	114–118	Oscar Robertson (35)	39–33
73	February 25	Chicago	105–108	Oscar Robertson (33)	40–33
74	February 28	Boston	129–123 (OT)	Oscar Robertson (41)	40–34
75	March 1	@ Syracuse	108–137	Arlen Bockhorn (17)	40–35
76	March 2	N Detroit	112–120	Oscar Robertson (41)	41–35
77	March 3	@ Chicago	126–119	Robertson, Twyman (27)	42–35
78	March 10	@ St. Louis	110–116	Jack Twyman (26)	42–36
79	March 13	@ Los Angeles	111–120	Oscar Robertson (24)	42–37
80	March 14	New York	134–136	Wayne Embry (23)	43–37

== Playoffs ==
1962 playoff game log
Division semifinals: 1–3 (home: 1–1; road: 0–2)

Game	Date	Team	Score	High points	Location	Series
1	March 16	@ Detroit	L 122–123	Bockhorn, Robertson (24)	Cobo Arena	0–1
2	March 17	Detroit	W 129–107	Oscar Robertson (33)	Cincinnati Gardens	1–1
3	March 18	@ Detroit	L 107–118	Oscar Robertson (26)	Cobo Arena	1–2
4	March 20	Detroit	L 111–112	Oscar Robertson (32)	Cincinnati Gardens	1–3

1962 schedule

== Player statistics ==
=== Regular season ===
Player	GP	GS	MPG	FG%	3FG%	FT%	RPG	APG	SPG	BPG	PPG
Arlen Bockhorn											
Bob Boozer											
Joe Buckhalter											
Wayne Embry											
Bevo Nordmann											
Hub Reed											
Oscar Robertson											
Adrian Smith											
Jack Twyman											
Bob Wiesenhahn											
Dave Zeller											

=== Playoffs ===
Player	GP	GS	MPG	FG%	3FG%	FT%	RPG	APG	SPG	BPG	PPG
Arlen Bockhorn											
Bob Boozer											
Joe Buckhalter											
Wayne Embry											
Bevo Nordmann											
Hub Reed											
Oscar Robertson											
Adrian Smith											
Jack Twyman											
Bob Wiesenhahn											
Dave Zeller											

== Awards and honors ==
- Oscar Robertson, All-NBA First Team
- Oscar Robertson, NBA Leader, Assists, 899
