= Fred Sawyer =

American basketball player

Personal information
- Born: Cleveland, Ohio, U.S.
- Listed height: 6 ft 11 in (2.11 m)
- Listed weight: 210 lb (95 kg)

Career information
- College: Louisville (1958–1961)
- NBA draft: 1961: 2nd round, 13th overall pick
- Drafted by: Los Angeles Lakers
- Position: Center

Career history
- 1961–1962: Hawaii Chiefs
- Stats at Basketball Reference

Fred Sawyer is an American former professional basketball player. He played collegiately for the Louisville Cardinals from 1958 to 1961. Sawyer was a secondary player for the Cardinals when they made the Final Four of the 1959 NCAA tournament but improved to become credited as the primary reason for the team's success during his junior season. Sawyer's height of 6 ft 11 in (2.11 m) led to an intimidating presence, such as when Western Kentucky Hilltoppers head coach Edgar Diddle remarked before a game that Sawyer was "the biggest man I ever saw" and must be "6 feet 13 or 14". During his senior season, Sawyer made a pledge he would not wash his socks until the Cardinals lost a game – a challenge that survived 12 games.

Sawyer was selected in the 1961 NBA draft by the Los Angeles Lakers as the 13th overall pick. Lakers head coach Fred Schaus considered Sawyer to "be a couple of years away" from playing in the National Basketball Association (NBA) but expected Sawyer to join the team during the following season. Sawyer began his professional career in the American Basketball League (ABL) with the Hawaii Chiefs during the 1961–62 season. During a game against the Washington Tapers on December 5, 1961, he was involved in a fight with Gene Conley that left Conley with a broken left hand.
