= Jack Turner (basketball, born 1939) =

American basketball player

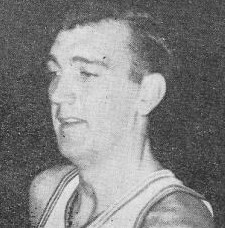

Personal information
- Born: June 5, 1939 Newport, Kentucky, U.S.
- Died: May 5, 2013 (aged 73) Newport, Kentucky, U.S.
- Listed height: 6 ft 5 in (1.96 m)
- Listed weight: 200 lb (91 kg)

Career information
- High school: Newport (Newport, Kentucky)
- College: Louisville (1958–1961)
- NBA draft: 1961: 2nd round, 18th overall pick
- Drafted by: Chicago Packers
- Position: Shooting guard
- Number: 22

Career history
- 1961–1962: Chicago Packers
- Stats at NBA.com
- Stats at Basketball Reference

John Willard Turner (June 5, 1939 – May 5, 2013) was a National Basketball Association (NBA) player for the Chicago Packers. He was drafted with the ninth pick in the second round of the 1961 NBA draft by the Chicago Packers. In his one NBA season, Turner averaged 4.8 points per game, 2.0 rebounds per game and 1.0 assist per game.

Turner died on May 5, 2013, at the age of 73.

Turner still ranks eighth all-time at the University of Louisville in both career scoring average (16.9 ppg) and career rebounding average (10.6 rpg)

== Career statistics ==
Legend
GP	Games played	GS	Games started	MPG	Minutes per game
FG%	Field goal percentage	3P%	3-point field goal percentage	FT%	Free throw percentage
RPG	Rebounds per game	APG	Assists per game	SPG	Steals per game
BPG	Blocks per game	PPG	Points per game	**Bold**	Career high

=== NBA ===
==== Regular season ====
Year	Team	GP	MPG	FG%	FT%	RPG	APG	PPG
1961–62	Chicago	42	13.5	.380	.762	2.0	1.0	4.8
