= 1961 NBA draft =

Basketball player selection

General information
- Sport: Basketball
- Date: March 27, 1961
- Location: St. Louis, Missouri
- Network: NBC

Overview
- 107 total selections in 15 rounds
- League: NBA
- Teams: 9
- First selection: Walt Bellamy, Chicago Packers
- Hall of Famers: 1: C Walt Bellamy

The 1961 NBA draft was the 15th annual draft of the National Basketball Association (NBA). The draft was held on March 27, 1961, before the 1961–62 season. In this draft, nine NBA teams took turns selecting amateur U.S. college basketball players. A player who had finished his four-year college eligibility was eligible for selection. If a player left college early, he would not be eligible for selection until his college class graduated. In each round, the teams select in reverse order of their win–loss record in the previous season. Before the draft, a team could forfeit its first-round draft pick and then select any player from within a 50-mile radius of its home arena as their territorial pick. An expansion franchise, the Chicago Packers, were assigned the first pick of the first round and the last pick of each subsequent round, along with five extra picks at the end of the second round. The draft consisted of 15 rounds comprising 107 players selected.

== Draft selections and draftee career notes ==
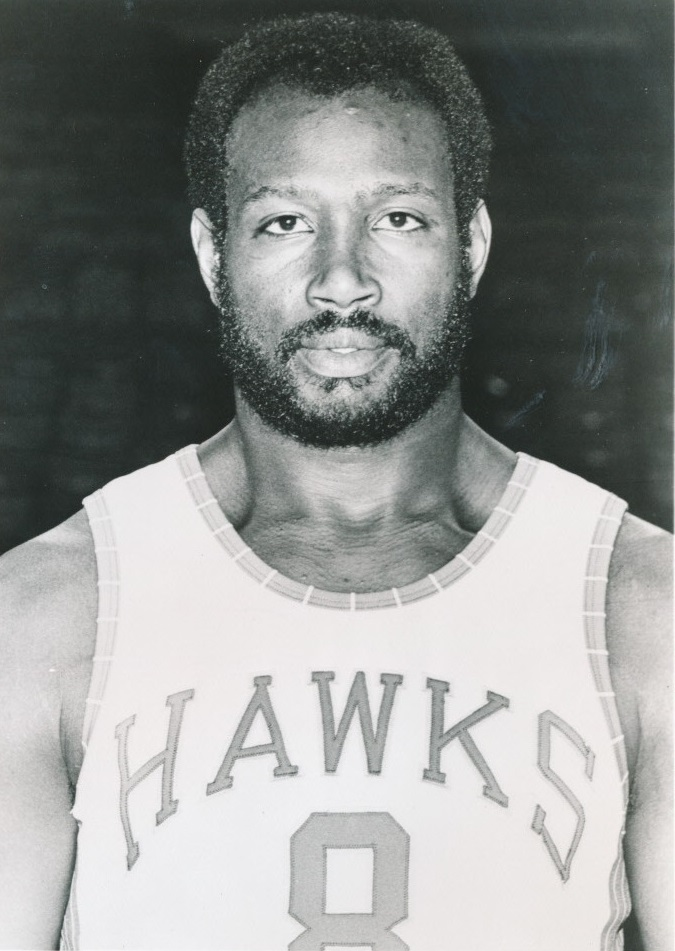
Walt Bellamy was selected first overall by the Chicago Packers.

Walt Bellamy from the Indiana University was selected first overall by the Chicago Packers. Bellamy went on to win the Rookie of the Year Award in his first season and was also selected to the All-Star Game. In his rookie season, he averaged 31.6 points per game, the second highest scoring average for a rookie, and 19.0 rebounds per game, the third highest rebounding average for a rookie. He was selected to four consecutive All-Star Games during his stint with the Packers, which later became the Chicago Zephyrs and Baltimore Bullets. He then played for three other NBA teams during his 14-year career. For his achievements, he has been inducted to the Basketball Hall of Fame.

Three other players from this draft, 7th pick Tom Meschery, 21st pick Don Kojis and 32nd pick Bill Bridges, have also been selected to at least one All-Star Game. Doug Moe, the 22nd pick, never played in the NBA. His contract with the Packers was voided due to his suspected involvement in the college basketball point shaving scandal. He eventually played in the American Basketball Association (ABA) for five years. He won the ABA championship in 1969 and was selected to three ABA All-Star Games and two All-ABA Teams. After his playing career, he became a head coach. He coached four NBA teams and won the Coach of the Year Award in 1988 with the Denver Nuggets. Ray Scott, the 4th pick, played for the Detroit Pistons for five and a half seasons before he moved on to play with two other teams in the NBA and ABA. After retiring as a player in 1972, he immediately became a head coach. He coached the Pistons for three and a half seasons and won the Coach of the Year Award in 1974. Two other players drafted also went on to have a coaching career: 12th pick Johnny Egan and 60th pick Donnie Butcher.

Similar to the 1951 draft, this draft would also be marked by a significant number of players being permanently banned in the NBA before even playing a single game due to their participation in a significant college scandal, in this case a gambling scandal. While none of the players selected this year were considered to have been as high profile of players as Gene Melchiorre, the #1 pick of the 1951 NBA draft was, a significant amount of players drafted during this time were still permanently banned due to their participation in the event all the same. Players from this draft who were selected by teams there, but were later permanently banned by the NBA (at least in terms of playing there) included the likes of Leroy Wright (the 16th pick of the draft), Jerry Graves (the 19th pick of the draft), Doug Moe (the 22nd pick of the draft), Tony Jackson (the 24th pick of the draft), Jack Egan (the 29th pick of the draft), and Vincent Kempton (the 107th and final pick of the draft). Many other players that went undrafted following this scandal would also be permanently banned by extension also, including two college freshmen at the time who would since become Hall of Famers following the case.

== Key ==
Pos.	G	F	C
Position	Guard	Forward	Center

^	Denotes player who has been inducted to the Naismith Memorial Basketball Hall of Fame
^{+}	Denotes player who has been selected for at least one All-Star Game
^{#}	Denotes player who has never appeared in an NBA regular-season or playoff game
^{~}	Denotes player who has been selected as Rookie of the Year

== Draft ==
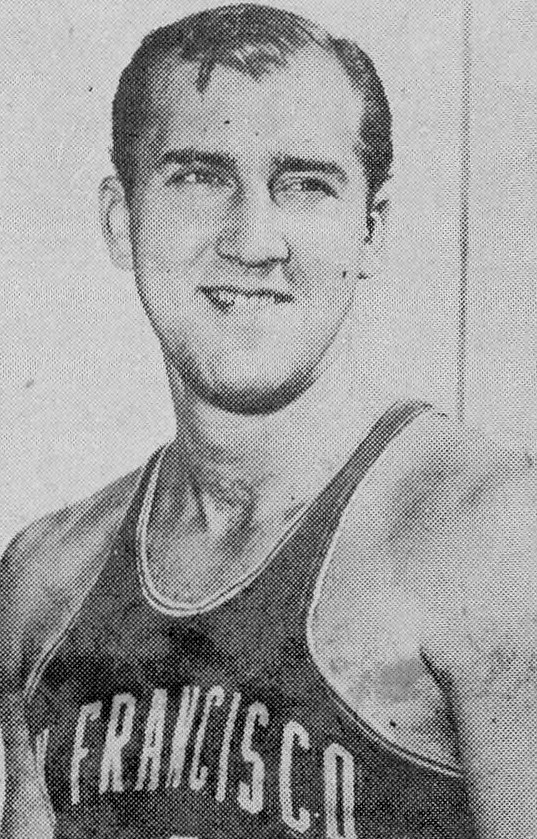
Tom Meschery was selected 7th overall by the Philadelphia Warriors.

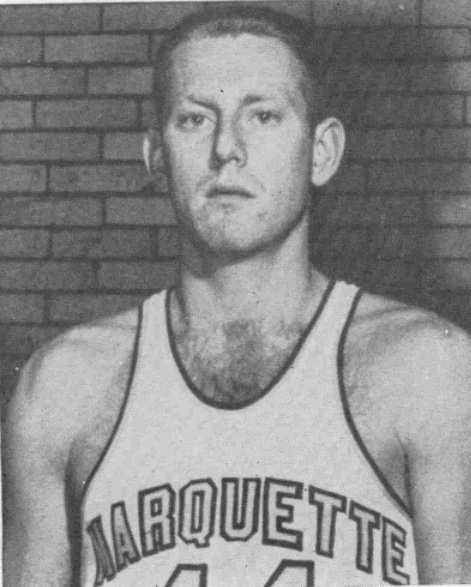
Don Kojis was selected 21st overall by the Chicago Packers.

Round	Pick	Player	Pos.	Nationality	Team	School/club team
1	1	Walt Bellamy^^{~}	C	United States	Chicago Packers	Indiana
1	2	Tom Stith	F	United States	New York Knicks	St. Bonaventure
1	3	Larry Siegfried	F	United States	Cincinnati Royals	Ohio State
1	4	Ray Scott	F/C	United States	Detroit Pistons	Allentown Jets (EPBL)
1	5	Wayne Yates	C	United States	Los Angeles Lakers	Memphis State
1	6	Ben Warley	G/F	United States	Syracuse Nationals	Cleveland Pipers (NIBL)
1	7	Tom Meschery^{+}	F	United States	Philadelphia Warriors	Saint Mary's (CA)
1	8	Cleo Hill	G	United States	St. Louis Hawks	Winston-Salem State
1	9	Gary Phillips	G	United States	Boston Celtics	Houston
2	10	Whitey Martin	G	United States	New York Knicks	St. Bonaventure
2	11	Bob Wiesenhahn	F	United States	Cincinnati Royals	Cincinnati
2	12	Johnny Egan	G	United States	Detroit Pistons	Providence
2	13	Fred Sawyer^{#}	C	United States	Los Angeles Lakers	Louisville
2	14	Chris Smith^{#}	C	United States	Syracuse Nationals	Virginia Tech
2	15	Ted Luckenbill	F	United States	Philadelphia Warriors	Houston
2	16	Ron Horn	F	United States	St. Louis Hawks	U.S. Armed Forces (AAU)
2	17	Al Butler	G	United States	Boston Celtics	Niagara
2	18	Jack Turner	G/F	United States	Chicago Packers	Louisville
2	19	Jerry Graves^{#}	F	United States	Chicago Packers	Mississippi State
2	20	York Larese	G	United States	Chicago Packers	North Carolina
2	21	Don Kojis^{+}	F	United States	Chicago Packers	Marquette
2	22	Doug Moe^{#}	G/F	United States	Chicago Packers	North Carolina
2	23	Jeff Cohen^{#}	C	United States	Chicago Packers	William & Mary

== Other picks ==
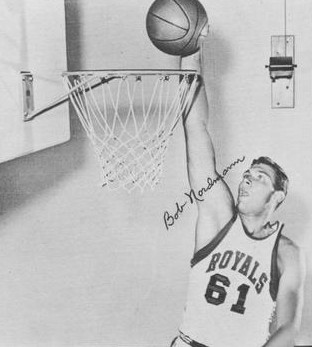
Bevo Nordmann was selected 25th overall by the Cincinnati Royals.

The following list includes other draft picks who have appeared in at least one NBA game.

Round	Pick	Player	Pos.	Nationality	Team	School/club team
3	25	Bevo Nordmann	C	United States	Cincinnati Royals	Saint Louis
3	26	Doug Kistler	F	United States	Detroit Pistons	Duke
3	28	Chuck Osborne	F	United States	Syracuse Nationals	Western Kentucky
3	32	Bill Bridges^{+}	F/C	United States	Chicago Packers	Kansas
4	33	George Blaney	G	United States	New York Knicks	Holy Cross
5	42	Bill Smith	G/F	United States	New York Knicks	Saint Peter's
5	44	Danny Doyle	F	United States	Detroit Pistons	Belmont Abbey
5	50	Howie Carl	G	United States	Chicago Packers	DePaul
6	51	Cleveland Buckner	F/C	United States	New York Knicks	Jackson State
7	60	Donnis Butcher	G	United States	New York Knicks	Pikeville
7	61	Dave Zeller	G	United States	Cincinnati Royals	Miami (OH)
10	91	Larry Comley	G	United States	Chicago Packers	Kansas State
11	92	Kevin Loughery	G	United States	New York Knicks	St. John's
12	100	George Patterson	F/C	United States	Cincinnati Royals	Toledo

== Notable undrafted players ==
These players were not selected in the 1961 draft but played at least one game in the NBA.

Player	Pos.	Nationality	School/club team
Ed Burton	SF	United States	Allentown Jets (EPBL)

== Notes ==
1: Tom Meschery (née Tomislav Mescheryakov) was born in Harbin, Manchuria (now part of China) to Russian parents. He moved to the United States at the age of 8 and became a naturalized U.S. citizen.

== See also ==
- List of first overall NBA draft picks
