= Bevo Nordmann =

American basketball player and coach

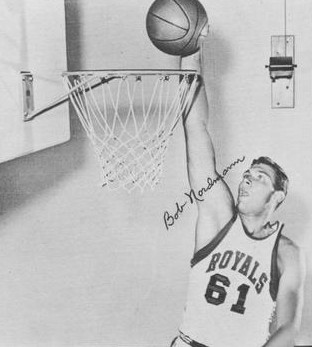

Personal information
- Born: December 11, 1939 St. Louis, Missouri, U.S.
- Died: August 24, 2015 (aged 75) DeWitt, Michigan, U.S.
- Listed height: 6 ft 10 in (2.08 m)
- Listed weight: 225 lb (102 kg)

Career information
- High school: St. Louis University HS (St. Louis, Missouri)
- College: Saint Louis (1958–1961)
- NBA draft: 1961: 3rd round, 25th overall pick
- Drafted by: Cincinnati Royals
- Playing career: 1961–1965
- Position: Center
- Number: 61, 10, 22, 34

Career history
- 1961–1962: Cincinnati Royals
- 1962: St. Louis Hawks
- 1962–1963: New York Knicks
- 1963–1964: St. Louis Hawks
- 1964: Boston Celtics
- 1964: Allentown Jets

Career highlights
- First-team All-MVC (1960)

Career NBA statistics
- Points: 571 (4.3 ppg)
- Rebounds: 517 (3.9 rpg)
- Assists: 73 (0.5 apg)
- Stats at NBA.com
- Stats at Basketball Reference

Robert William "Bevo" Nordmann (December 11, 1939 – August 24, 2015) was an American professional basketball player. He played college basketball for the Saint Louis Billikens.

Born in St. Louis, Missouri, Nordmann was a 6'10" center who played at Saint Louis University from 1958 to 1961. He was named to the All-MVC First Team during his junior season, when he averaged 16 points per game.

In 1961, Nordmann was drafted by the Cincinnati Royals with the 25th pick in the NBA draft. He appeared in four NBA seasons as a member of the Royals, St. Louis Hawks, New York Knicks and Boston Celtics, averaging 4.3 points per game.

After his basketball playing career ended, Nordmann served as an assistant coach at Michigan State University and Saint Louis University. He was inducted into Saint Louis' Hall of Fame in 2005. Nordmann died from cancer on August 24, 2015.

== Career statistics ==
Legend
GP	Games played	GS	Games started	MPG	Minutes per game
FG%	Field goal percentage	3P%	3-point field goal percentage	FT%	Free throw percentage
RPG	Rebounds per game	APG	Assists per game	SPG	Steals per game
BPG	Blocks per game	PPG	Points per game	**Bold**	Career high

=== NBA ===
==== Regular season ====
Year	Team	GP	MPG	FG%	FT%	RPG	APG	PPG
1961–62	Cincinnati	**58**	5.9	.405	.509	2.2	.3	2.3
1962–63	St. Louis	27	10.0	.450	.538	3.1	.3	3.4
1962–63	New York	26	**28.0**	.502	.458	**8.9**	**1.5**	**10.7**
1963–64	New York	7	15.1	.520	**.571**	3.6	.1	4.9
1963–64	St. Louis	12	12.8	.341	.200	3.3	.4	2.4
1964–65	Boston	3	8.3	**.600**	–	2.7	1.0	2.0
Career		133	12.2	.459	.490	3.9	.45	4.3

==== Playoffs ====
Year	Team	GP	MPG	FG%	FT%	RPG	APG	PPG
1962	Cincinnati	2	2.5	.000	–	1.0	.0	.0
