= Arlen Bockhorn =

American basketball player

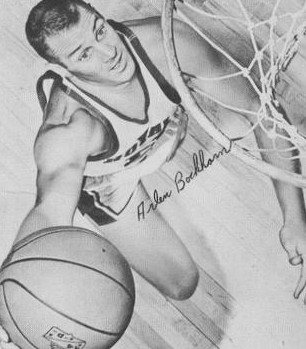

Personal information
- Born: July 8, 1933 (age 93) Campbell Hill, Illinois, U.S.
- Listed height: 6 ft 4 in (1.93 m)
- Listed weight: 200 lb (91 kg)

Career information
- High school: Trico (Campbell Hill, Illinois)
- College: Dayton (1955–1958)
- NBA draft: 1958: 3rd round, 17th overall pick
- Drafted by: Cincinnati Royals
- Playing career: 1958–1965
- Position: Shooting guard
- Number: 15, 11

Career history
- 1958–1965: Cincinnati Royals

Career statistics
- Points: 5,430 (11.5 ppg)
- Rebounds: 2,234 (4.7 rpg)
- Assists: 1,645 (3.5 apg)
- Stats at NBA.com
- Stats at Basketball Reference

Arlen Dale "Bucky" Bockhorn (born July 8, 1933) is an American former basketball player. He was a guard for the National Basketball Association's Cincinnati Royals from 1958 to 1965. He played college basketball for the Dayton Flyers and is a member of Dayton's Hall of Fame and All-Century team.

== Early life ==
Raised in the small coal-mining town of Campbell Hill, Illinois, Bockhorn attended Trico Consolidated High School.

== College career ==
Bockhorn spent a year at the University of Dayton and two years in the U.S. Army before becoming a starter for three National Invitation Tournament (NIT) teams at Dayton, beginning in 1955–56. As a sophomore at Dayton, Bockhorn was on a team that had a 25–4 record, finished third in the final Associated Press poll and was runner-up in the NIT. He averaged 10.7, 11.8 and 10.8 points in his three UD seasons, averaging 12.4 rebounds in 1957–58 when he was the team's most valuable player. In his three seasons, the Flyers were a combined 69–17.

Bockhorn has the distinction of being one of three brothers to play on one varsity major college team, in 1957–58 with brothers Terry and Harold, one of the few times this has happened in Division I history. Brothers Matthew, Thomas and William Brennan also played together in 1957–58, for Villanova University. The two trios of brothers were the last to play together in Division I for 54 seasons until Miles, Mason, and Marshall Plumlee played for Duke University in 2011–12.

== NBA career ==
Bockhorn was selected in the third round (17th overall) of the 1958 NBA draft by the Cincinnati Royals.

Known primarily as a tough defender, he was primarily a starter at guard alongside Johnny McCarthy for one season, Win Wilfong for one season, then future Hall-of-Famer Oscar Robertson for three seasons, his most productive season was 1961–62, when he averaged a career-high 15.8 points along with 4.7 rebounds and a career-high 4.6 assists The Royals posted a record of 43–37, advancing to the NBA playoffs, where they were ousted by the Detroit Pistons. On January 18, 1962,. Bockhorn and Oscar Robertson became the first NBA teammates to record triple-doubles in the same game: Bockhorn had 19 points, 12 assists, and 10 rebounds, while Robertson totalled 28–16–14 in a 151–133 win against the Philadelphia Warriors.

In 1962–63, with Bockhorn still a starter and averaging 11.7 points, 4.0 rebounds and 3.3 assists per game, the Royals went 42–38 to again make the playoffs, where they defeated the Syracuse Nationals in the first round. In the Eastern Division finals against the Boston Celtics, the Royals extended the eventual champions to a seventh and deciding game, which the Royals lost 142–131. Although the Royals got 43 points from Robertson (Bockhorn scored nine), the Celtics countered with Sam Jones' 47 and Tom Heinsohn's 31.

In 1963–64, with Bockhorn primarily coming off the bench and averaging 8.3 points per game, the Royals recorded a stellar 55–25 record and once again advanced to the Eastern Division finals, where they again lost to the Celtics, this time in five games.

A knee injury curtailed his career 19 games into the 1964–65 season.

In seven NBA seasons, all with the Royals, Bockhorn played in 474 games, averaging 11.5 points, 4.7 rebounds and 3.5 assists per game.

== Personal life ==
After retiring from the NBA, Bockhorn became a successful businessman in Dayton. Since 1970, Bockhorn has provided the color commentary for WHIO radio broadcasts of University of Dayton men's basketball games. In 2010, he was awarded the Bob Vetrone Atlantic 10 Media Award by the league's sports information directors. He has also been a big booster and advocate of the University of Dayton.

Bockhorn is a member of the University of Dayton Hall of Fame and in 2003–04 he was named to Dayton's All-Century Team. In 2011, he was inducted into the Ohio Basketball Hall of Fame. In 2012, the practice court at the University of Dayton's new Cronin Athletics Center was named Bockhorn Court.

He and his wife, Peggy, reside in Dayton.

== Career statistics ==
Legend
| GP | Games played | GS | Games started | MPG | Minutes per game |
| FG% | Field goal percentage | 3P% | 3-point field goal percentage | FT% | Free throw percentage |
| RPG | Rebounds per game | APG | Assists per game | SPG | Steals per game |
| BPG | Blocks per game | PPG | Points per game | **Bold** | Career high |
| * | Led the league |

=== NBA ===
==== Regular season ====
| Year | Team | GP | MPG | FG% | FT% | RPG | APG | PPG |
|---|---|---|---|---|---|---|---|---|
| 1958–59 | Cincinnati | 71 | 31.7 | .381 | .704 | **6.5** | 2.9 | 10.2 |
| 1959–60 | Cincinnati | 75 | 28.0 | .398 | .747 | 5.1 | 3.4 | 10.5 |
| 1960–61 | Cincinnati | 79* | 33.8 | .397 | .731 | 5.5 | 4.3 | 12.6 |
| 1961–62 | Cincinnati | **80*** | **38.3** | **.430** | **.789** | 4.7 | 4.6 | **15.8** |
| 1962–63 | Cincinnati | **80*** | 32.7 | .393 | .756 | 4.0 | 3.3 | 11.7 |
| 1963–64 | Cincinnati | 70 | 23.9 | .412 | .762 | 2.9 | 2.5 | 8.3 |
| 1964–65 | Cincinnati | 19 | 22.3 | .382 | .718 | 2.9 | 2.4 | 7.8 |
| Career | | 474 | 31.2 | .403 | .748 | 4.7 | 3.5 | 11.5 |

==== Playoffs ====
| Year | Team | GP | MPG | FG% | FT% | RPG | APG | PPG |
|---|---|---|---|---|---|---|---|---|
| 1962 | Cincinnati | 4 | **39.3** | **.435** | **.875** | **4.8** | **5.0** | **17.0** |
| 1963 | Cincinnati | **12** | 33.9 | .415 | .742 | 3.8 | 3.3 | 11.3 |
| 1964 | Cincinnati | 10 | 30.1 | .380 | .750 | 3.9 | 3.9 | 9.7 |
| Career | | 26 | 33.3 | .407 | .776 | 4.0 | 3.8 | 11.5 |
