= Wayne Stevens (basketball) =

American professional basketball player (1936–2021)

Personal information
- Born: June 19, 1936 Chillicothe, Ohio, U.S.
- Died: January 23, 2021 (aged 84) Ocala, Florida, U.S.
- Listed height: 6 ft 3 in (1.91 m)
- Listed weight: 185 lb (84 kg)

Career information
- High school: Chillicothe (Chillicothe, Ohio)
- College: Cincinnati (1955–1958)
- NBA draft: 1958: 7th round, 49th overall pick
- Drafted by: Cincinnati Royals
- Position: Small forward
- Number: 20

Career history
- 1959: Cincinnati Royals
- Stats at NBA.com
- Stats at Basketball Reference

Wayne Leroy Stevens (June 19, 1936 – January 23, 2021) was an American professional basketball player.

== Biography ==
Stevens was born in Chillicothe, Ohio, and attended Chillicothe High School, where he was a three-time All-Central Ohio League selection in basketball. As a junior in 1952–53, he was named Class A (big-school) second-team all-state by the Associated Press (AP). As a senior in 1953–54, he was again named second-team all-state, along with future basketball hall-of-famer Wayne Embry and baseball hall-of-famer Bill Mazeroski. In track, he was also the state high-jump champion.

Stevens played college basketball for coach George Smith at the University of Cincinnati. As a sophomore starting forward in 1955–56, Stevens scored 10.3 points per game and grabbed a team-leading 13.9 rebounds per game for the 17-7 Bearcats.

As a junior in 1956–57, Stevens averaged 13.0 points and 11.3 rebounds per game, both second on the team behind center Connie Dierking, for the 15-9 Bearcats.

As a senior in 1957–58, third-year starter Stevens and Dierking served as co-captains and Stevens averaged 10.7 points and 5.1 rebounds per game. The Bearcats, who welcomed sophomore starters Oscar Robertson and Ralph Davis to the team, went 25-3 and won the Missouri Valley Conference (MVC) and advanced to the NCAA Tournament, where, in the Midwest Regional, they fell to Kansas State in overtime before defeating Arkansas.

Stevens was selected in the seventh round (49th overall) of the 1958 NBA draft by the Cincinnati Royals. He played in eight games for the Royals during the beginning of the 1959–60 NBA season, and averaging 1.6 points and 2.0 rebounds per game.

Stevens died on January 23, 2021, in Ocala, Florida.

== Career statistics ==
Legend
GP	Games played	GS	Games started	MPG	Minutes per game
FG%	Field goal percentage	3P%	3-point field goal percentage	FT%	Free throw percentage
RPG	Rebounds per game	APG	Assists per game	SPG	Steals per game
BPG	Blocks per game	PPG	Points per game	**Bold**	Career high

=== NBA ===
==== Regular season ====
Year	Team	GP	MPG	FG%	FT%	RPG	APG	PPG
1959–60	Cincinnati	8	6.1	.158	.700	2.0	.5	1.6
