= Jim McConnell =

American politician (born 1946)

Member of the New Hampshire House of Representatives from the Cheshire 12th district
- In office December 3, 2014 – December 5, 2018 Serving with Ben Tilton (2014–2016), F. Barrett "Barry" Faulkner (2016–2018)
- Preceded by: Gus Lerandeau; Jane Johnson
- Succeeded by: Jennie Gomarlo

Personal details
- Born: 1946 (age 79–80)
- Party: Republican

James (Jim) W. McConnell (born 1946) is an American politician. He was a member of the New Hampshire House of Representatives.
