= 1958 NBA draft =

Basketball player selection

General information
- Sport: Basketball
- Date: April 22, 1958
- Location: Detroit, Michigan

Overview
- 88 total selections in 17 rounds
- League: NBA
- Territorial picks: Guy Rodgers, Philadelphia Warriors
- First selection: Elgin Baylor, Minneapolis Lakers
- Hall of Famers: 3: G Guy Rodgers; F Elgin Baylor; G Hal Greer

The 1958 NBA draft was the 12th annual draft of the National Basketball Association (NBA). The draft was held on April 22, 1958, before the 1958–59 season. In this draft, eight NBA teams took turns selecting amateur U.S. college basketball players. In each round, the teams select in reverse order of their win–loss record in the previous season. The draft consisted of 17 rounds comprising 88 players selected.

== Draft selections and draftee career notes ==
Elgin Baylor from Seattle University was selected first overall by the Minneapolis Lakers. Baylor went on to win the Rookie of the Year Award in his first season. Guy Rodgers from Temple University was selected before the draft as Philadelphia Warriors' territorial pick. Three players from this draft, Elgin Baylor, Guy Rodgers and Hal Greer, have been inducted to the Basketball Hall of Fame. Frank Howard from Ohio State University was selected in the third round by the Philadelphia Warriors, but he opted for a professional baseball career and eventually playing 16 successful seasons in the Major League Baseball (MLB).

== Key ==
Pos.	G	F	C
Position	Guard	Forward	Center

^	Denotes player who has been inducted to the Naismith Memorial Basketball Hall of Fame
^{+}	Denotes player who has been selected for at least one All-Star Game
^{#}	Denotes player who has never appeared in an NBA regular-season or playoff game
^{~}	Denotes player who has been selected as Rookie of the Year

== Draft ==
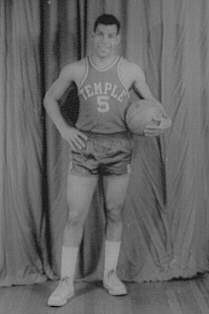
Guy Rodgers was selected as the Philadelphia Warriors' territorial pick.

Round	Pick	Player	Position	Nationality	Team	College
T	–	Guy Rodgers^	G	United States	Philadelphia Warriors	Temple
1	1	Elgin Baylor^^{~}	F	United States	Minneapolis Lakers	Seattle
1	2	Archie Dees	F/C	United States	Cincinnati Royals	Indiana
1	3	Mike Farmer	F	United States	New York Knicks (from Detroit)^{[a]}	San Francisco
1	4	Pete Brennan	F	United States	New York Knicks	North Carolina
1	5	Connie Dierking	F/C	United States	Syracuse Nationals	Cincinnati
1	6	Dave Gambee	F	United States	St. Louis Hawks	Oregon State
1	7	Bennie Swain	F	United States	Boston Celtics	Texas Southern
2	8	Steve Hamilton	F/C	United States	Minneapolis Lakers	Morehead State
2	9	Vernon Hatton	G	United States	Cincinnati Royals	Kentucky
2	10	Barney Cable	F	United States	Detroit Pistons	Bradley
2	11	Joe Quigg^{#}	F/C	United States	New York Knicks	North Carolina
2	12	Lloyd Sharrar^{#}	C	United States	Philadelphia Warriors	West Virginia
2	13	Hal Greer^	G/F	United States	Syracuse Nationals	Marshall
2	14	Hub Reed	F/C	United States	St. Louis Hawks	Oklahoma City
2	15	Jimmy Smith^{#}	F	United States	Boston Celtics	Franciscan

== Other picks ==
The following list includes other draft picks who have appeared in at least one NBA game.

Round	Pick	Player	Position	Nationality	Team	College
3	16	Boo Ellis	F	United States	Minneapolis Lakers	Niagara
3	17	Bucky Bockhorn	G	United States	Cincinnati Royals	Dayton
3	22	Wayne Embry^{+}	F/C	United States	St. Louis Hawks	Miami (OH)
4	27	Johnny Cox	G	United States	New York Knicks	Kentucky
4	29	Tommy Kearns	G	United States	Syracuse Nationals	North Carolina
5	36	Don Ohl^{+}	G	United States	Philadelphia Warriors	Illinois
6	42	Shellie McMillon	F	United States	Detroit Pistons	Bradley
7	49	Wayne Stevens	F	United States	Cincinnati Royals	Cincinnati
9	64	Larry Staverman	F	United States	Cincinnati Royals	Villa Madonna
10	70	Jack Parr	C	United States	Cincinnati Royals	Kansas State
12	81	Joe Buckhalter	F	United States	St. Louis Hawks	Tennessee State
15	85	Adrian Smith^{+}	G	United States	Cincinnati Royals	Kentucky

== Notable undrafted players ==
These players were not selected in the 1958 draft but played at least one game in the NBA.

Player	Pos.	Nationality	School/club team
Stacey Arceneaux	SG	United States	Iowa State
Whitey Bell	PG	United States	NC State

== Trades ==
- ^{a} Prior to the draft, the New York Knicks acquired the Detroit Pistons' first-round pick, which was used to select Mike Farmer, from the Pistons in exchange for Dick McGuire.

== See also ==
- List of first overall NBA draft picks
