= 1961–62 NBA season =

16th NBA season

- League: National Basketball Association
- Sport: Basketball
- Duration: October 19, 1961 – March 14, 1962; March 16 – April 5, 1962 (Playoffs); April 7–18, 1962 (Finals)
- Games: 80
- Teams: 9
- TV partner: NBC

Draft
- Top draft pick: Walt Bellamy
- Picked by: Chicago Packers

Regular season
- Top seed: Boston Celtics
- Season MVP: Bill Russell (Boston)
- Top scorer: Wilt Chamberlain (Philadelphia)

Playoffs
- Eastern champions: Boston Celtics
- Eastern runners-up: Philadelphia Warriors
- Western champions: Los Angeles Lakers
- Western runners-up: Detroit Pistons

Finals
- Champions: Boston Celtics
- Runners-up: Los Angeles Lakers

NBA seasons
- ← 1960–61 1962–63 →

The 1961–62 NBA season was the 16th season of the National Basketball Association. The season ended with the Boston Celtics winning their fourth straight NBA championship, beating the Los Angeles Lakers 4 games to 3 in the NBA Finals.

== Notable occurrences ==
- The Chicago Packers entered the league, bringing the number of teams to nine. Originally, there was planned to be a new franchise in Pittsburgh that was to be added alongside them, but the Pittsburgh franchise ended up withdrawing their application to join the NBA on January 18, 1961 due to a disagreement with the Boston Celtics regarding the availability of Bill Sharman to coach the upcoming Pittsburgh franchise.
- The NBA also initially voted to add in the new American Basketball League champions in the Cleveland Pipers into the NBA, with the Pipers' addition being a merger between them and the runner-up Kansas City Steers ABL franchise (with them essentially adding the best players from both teams onto the Pipers once they entered the NBA). However, financial complications from team owner (and future New York Yankees team owner) George Steinbrenner's end would help cause the NBA to renege on their decision to add the Pipers into the NBA, which later caused the Pipers to fold operations as a franchise soon afterward (as well as became the final breaking point on Maurice Podoloff's end for his eventual resignation as the NBA's president).
- The NBA schedule was expanded for the third consecutive season. This time it went from 79 games per team, to 80.
- The Philadelphia Warriors played their final season before their transcontinental relocation to San Francisco for the following season. The NBA would return to Philadelphia in 1963.
- The 1962 NBA All-Star Game was played in St. Louis, Missouri, with the West beating the East 150–130. Local favorite Bob Pettit won the game's MVP award.
- In a game played in Hershey, Pennsylvania, Wilt Chamberlain made history by scoring 100 points in the Philadelphia Warriors 169–147 win over the New York Knicks. It still stands as one of the greatest individual feats in sports history. Chamberlain would go on to average 50.4 points per game that season, another record.
- This year witnessed the first occurrence of a player averaging a triple-double throughout an entire season when Oscar Robertson averaged 30.8 points, 11.4 assists, and 12.5 rebounds per game.
- This was the last season of the NBA on NBC, the network would regain NBA coverage starting in the 1990–91 season.

Coaching changes
Offseason
Team	1960–61 coach	1961–62 coach
New York Knicks	Carl Braun	Eddie Donovan
Philadelphia Warriors	Neil Johnston	Frank McGuire
In-season
Team	Outgoing coach	Incoming coach
St. Louis Hawks	Paul Seymour	Andrew Levane; Bob Pettit

== Final standings ==
=== Eastern Division ===
Eastern Division	W	L	PCT	GB	Home	Road	Neutral	Div
x-Boston Celtics	60	20	.750	–	23–5	26–12	11–3	26–10
x-Philadelphia Warriors	49	31	.613	11	18–11	19–19	12–1	18–18
x-Syracuse Nationals	41	39	.513	19	18–10	11–19	12–10	17–19
New York Knicks	29	51	.363	31	19–15	2–23	8–13	11–25

=== Western Division ===
Western Division	W	L	PCT	GB	Home	Road	Neutral	Div
x-Los Angeles Lakers	54	26	.675	–	26–5	18–13	10–8	33–13
x-Cincinnati Royals	43	37	.538	11	18–13	14–16	11–8	29–17
x-Detroit Pistons	37	43	.463	17	16–14	8–17	13–12	24–22
St. Louis Hawks	29	51	.363	25	19–16	7–27	3–8	16–30
Chicago Packers	18	62	.225	36	15-23	3-39	0–0	10–30

x – clinched playoff spot

== Playoffs ==
Division Semifinals
E3	Syracuse	2
E2	Philadelphia	3
W3	Detroit	3
W2	Cincinnati	1

Division Finals
Eastern Division
E1	Boston*	4
E2	Philadelphia	3
Western Division
W1	Los Angeles*	4
W3	Detroit	2

NBA Finals
E1	Boston*	4
W1	Los Angeles*	3

- * Division winner
- Bold Series winner
- Italic Team with home-court advantage in NBA Finals

== Statistics leaders ==
Category	Player	Team	Stat
Points	Wilt Chamberlain	Philadelphia Warriors	4,029
Rebounds	Wilt Chamberlain	Philadelphia Warriors	2,052
Assists	Oscar Robertson	Cincinnati Royals	899
FG%	Walt Bellamy	Chicago Packers	.519
FT%	Dolph Schayes	Syracuse Nationals	.899

Note: Prior to the 1969–70 season, league leaders in points, rebounds, and assists were determined by totals rather than averages.

== NBA awards ==
- Most Valuable Player: Bill Russell, Boston Celtics
- Rookie of the Year: Walt Bellamy, Chicago Packers
- All-NBA First Team:
  - F – Elgin Baylor, Los Angeles Lakers
  - F – Bob Pettit, St. Louis Hawks
  - C – Wilt Chamberlain, Philadelphia Warriors
  - G – Oscar Robertson, Cincinnati Royals
  - G – Jerry West, Los Angeles Lakers
- All-NBA Second Team:
  - F – Tom Heinsohn, Boston Celtics
  - F – Jack Twyman, Cincinnati Royals
  - C – Bill Russell, Boston Celtics
  - G – Bob Cousy, Boston Celtics
  - G – Richie Guerin, New York Knicks

== Individual statistics ==
The 1961–62 season is notable for having some of the most impressive individual season statistics ever. A number of records were set this season, some of which still stand to this day. Below is a table showcasing some of the most significant individual per game statistics of the season.

Player	Team	GP	MPG	PPG	RPG	APG
Wilt Chamberlain	Philadelphia	80	48.5	50.4	25.7	2.4
Bill Russell	Boston	76	45.2	18.9	23.6	4.5
Oscar Robertson	Cincinnati	79	44.3	30.8	12.5	11.4
Elgin Baylor	Los Angeles	44	44.4	38.3	18.6	4.6
Bob Pettit	St Louis	78	42.1	31.1	18.7	3.7
Jerry West	Los Angeles	75	41.2	30.8	7.9	5.4
Richie Guerin	New York	78	42.9	29.5	6.4	6.9
Walt Bellamy	Chicago	79	42.3	31.6	19.0	2.7
Cliff Hagan	St Louis	77	36.2	22.9	8.2	4.8
Willie Naulls	New York	75	39.7	25.0	11.6	2.6
Red Kerr	Syracuse	80	34.6	16.3	14.7	3.0

When comparing these players to the 2014–15 NBA league leaders, 7 of these players would win the scoring title, 5 would win the rebounding title and 1 would win the assist title.

== See also ==
- List of NBA regular season records
