= Oh Happy Day (disambiguation) =

"Oh Happy Day" is a 1967 gospel song.

Oh Happy Day may also refer to:

- "Oh Happy Day" (1952 song), the pop song made famous by Don Howard and Larry Hooper
- Oh Happy Day (Don Patterson album), 1969
- Oh Happy Day (Glen Campbell album), 1970
- Oh Happy Day: An All-Star Music Celebration, a 2009 gospel compilation album
- "O Happy Day", a 1755 hymn by Philip Doddridge

== See also ==
- Happy Day (disambiguation)
- Happy Days (disambiguation)
