= Happy Daze =

Happy Daze may refer to:

- Happy Daze (Lindisfarne album), a 1974 album by Lindisfarne
- Happy Daze (Battlefield Band album), 2001
- Happy Daze (compilation album), 1990 compilation album of Madchester and associated singles

== See also ==
- Happy Days (disambiguation)
