= Nutcracker: Money, Madness and Murder =

- DVD cover
- Based on: Nutcracker: Money, Madness, Murder: A Family Album by Shana Alexander
- Written by: William Hanley
- Directed by: Paul Bogart
- Starring: Lee Remick
- Theme music composer: Billy Goldenberg
- Country of origin: United States
- Original language: English
- No. of episodes: 3

Production
- Producers: William Beaudine Jr. William Hanley; Chuck McLain; Tracy Wolff-Hughes
- Cinematography: Isidore Mankofsky
- Editors: Richard Bracken; Jack Fegan
- Running time: 300 minutes (total)
- Production companies: Green Arrow Productions; Warner Bros. Television

Original release
- Network: NBC
- Release: March 22 – March 24, 1987

Nutcracker: Money, Madness and Murder is a 1987 miniseries directed by Paul Bogart based on the book Nutcracker: Money, Madness, Murder: A Family Album by Shana Alexander that tells the story of Frances Schreuder.

== Synopsis ==
New York City resident and wannabe socialite Frances Berenice Schreuder (née Bradshaw) plots the murder of her multi-millionaire father Franklin Bradshaw. She has stolen money from him in the past and has also alienated her sisters; however, her mother is blind to her narcissism and staunchly defends her. Schreuder wants her daughter to become a famous ballerina. Totally without scruples, she tries to manipulate the men in her life, including her two sons, into doing her bidding.

== Cast ==
- Lee Remick as Frances Schreuder
- Tate Donovan as Marc
- John Glover as Richard Behrens
- Linda Kelsey as Elaine
- Frank Military as Larry
- John Kirby as Frank
- G.D. Spradlin as Franklin Bradshaw
- Inga Swenson as Marilyn
- Elizabeth Wilson as Berenice Bradshaw
- David Ackroyd as Jones
- Lee de Broux as Van Dam
- Jonathan Frakes as Rosen
- Tony Musante as Vittorio
- Ben Hartigan as Minister

== Reception ==
Critics from The Los Angeles Times and The New York Times both noted that this was the second of two miniseries adaptations of the Frances Schreuder story, the earlier adaptation being At Mother's Request.

== Accolades ==
Lee Remick was nominated for a Primetime Emmy Award for Outstanding Lead Actress in a Limited Series or Movie and John Glover was nominated for a Primetime Emmy Award for Outstanding Supporting Actor in a Limited Series or Movie at the 39th Primetime Emmy Awards.
