= Jerry West =

American basketball player and executive (1938–2024)

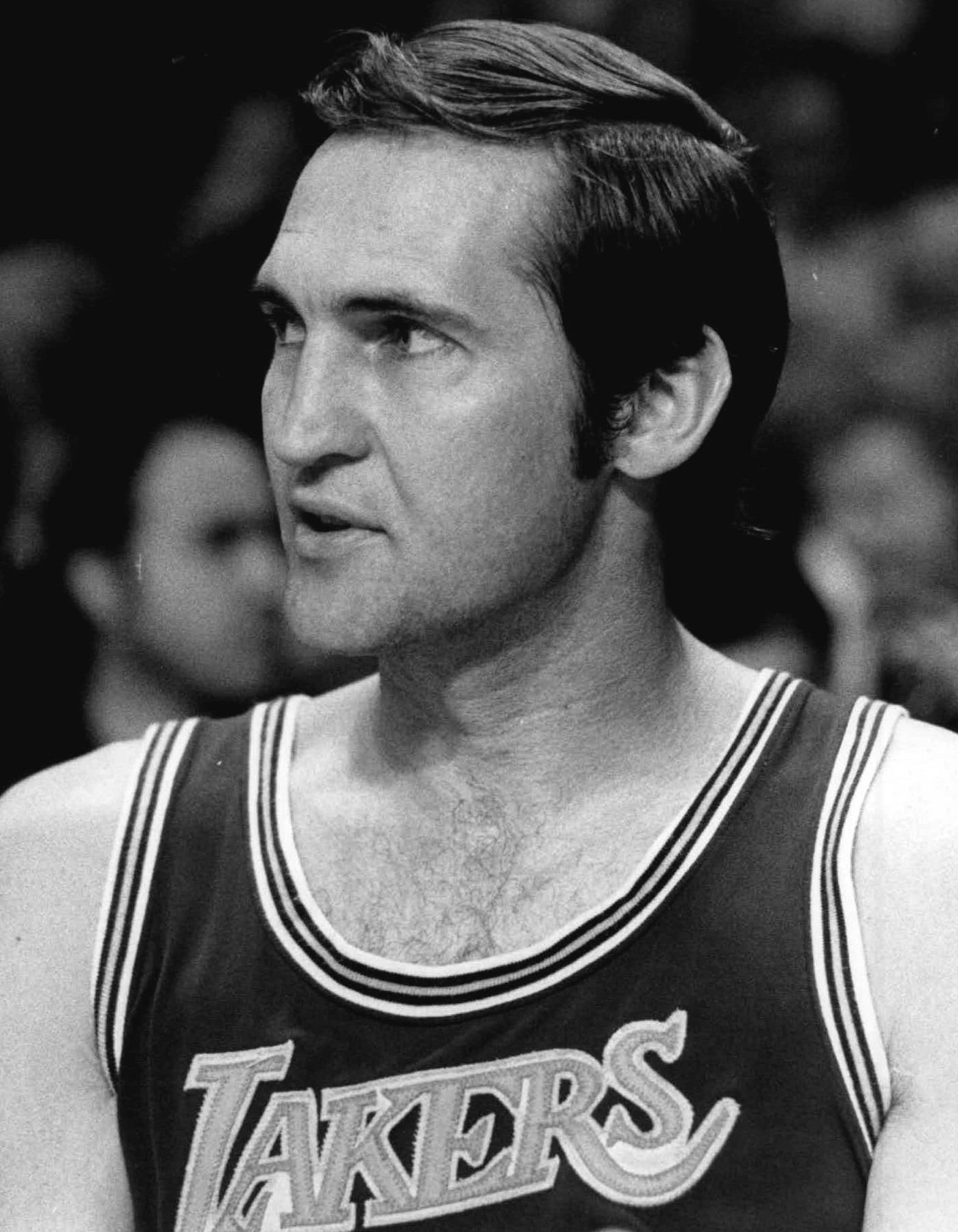
- West with the Los Angeles Lakers in 1972

Personal information
- Born: May 28, 1938 Chelyan, West Virginia, U.S.
- Died: June 12, 2024 (aged 86) Los Angeles, California, U.S.
- Listed height: 6 ft 3 in (1.91 m) (Note: Listed by the NBA at 6 feet 3 inches (1.91 m), West has stated that he was 6 feet 4.5 inches (1.943 m).)
- Listed weight: 175 lb (79 kg)

Career information
- High school: East Bank (East Bank, West Virginia)
- College: West Virginia (1957–1960)
- NBA draft: 1960: 1st round, 2nd overall pick
- Drafted by: Minneapolis Lakers
- Playing career: 1960–1974
- Position: Point guard / shooting guard
- Number: 44
- Coaching career: 1976–1979

Career history

Playing
- 1960–1974: Los Angeles Lakers

Coaching
- 1976–1979: Los Angeles Lakers

Career highlights
- As player: NBA champion (1972); NBA Finals MVP (1969); 14× NBA All-Star (1961–1974); NBA All-Star Game MVP (1972); 10× All-NBA First Team (1962–1967, 1970–1973); 2× All-NBA Second Team (1968, 1969); 4× NBA All-Defensive First Team (1970–1973); NBA All-Defensive Second Team (1969); NBA scoring champion (1970); NBA assists leader (1972); NBA anniversary team (35th, 50th, 75th); No. 44 retired by Los Angeles Lakers; NCAA Final Four Most Outstanding Player (1959); 2× Consensus first-team All-American (1959, 1960); Third-team All-American – AP, UPI (1958); 2× SoCon Player of the Year (1959, 1960); No. 44 retired by West Virginia Mountaineers; As executive: 8× NBA champion (1980, 1982, 1985, 1987, 1988, 2000, 2015, 2017); 2× NBA Executive of the Year (1995, 2004); Other: Presidential Medal of Freedom (2019)

Career playing statistics
- Points: 25,192 (27.0 ppg)
- Rebounds: 5,366 (5.8 rpg)
- Assists: 6,238 (6.7 apg)
- Stats at NBA.com
- Stats at Basketball Reference

Career coaching record
- NBA: 145–101 (.589)
- Record at Basketball Reference
- Basketball Hall of Fame
- Collegiate Basketball Hall of Fame
Medals
Men's basketball
Representing the United States
Olympic Games
Gold medal – first place	1960 Rome	Team competition
Pan American Games
Gold medal – first place	1959 Chicago	Team competition

Jerry Alan West (Note: Some sources list his name as Jerome Alan West. Author Jonathan Coleman, who co-wrote West's memoir West by West with him, wrote that his name is Jerry Alan West, "not Jerome, never Jerome".) (May 28, 1938 – June 12, 2024) was an American basketball player and executive. He played professionally for the Los Angeles Lakers of the National Basketball Association (NBA), and is universally regarded as one of the greatest players of all time. His nicknames included "the Logo", in reference to his silhouette being the basis for the NBA logo; "Mr. Clutch", for his ability to make a big play in a key situation such as his famous buzzer-beating 60-foot shot that tied game 3 of the 1970 NBA Finals against the New York Knicks; "Mr. Outside", in reference to his perimeter play with the Lakers and "Zeke from Cabin Creek" for the creek near his birthplace of Chelyan, West Virginia.

West played college basketball for the West Virginia Mountaineers, leading them to the 1959 NCAA championship game. He earned the NCAA Final Four Most Outstanding Player honor despite the loss in the championship. He then embarked on a 14-year career with the Lakers and was the co-captain of the 1960 U.S. Olympic gold medal team, a squad that was inducted as a unit into the Naismith Memorial Basketball Hall of Fame in 2010.

Playing mostly the guard position, West was voted 12 times into the All-NBA First and Second Teams, was elected into the NBA All-Star Team 14 times and was chosen as the All-Star MVP in 1972, the same year that he won the only title of his career. West holds the NBA record for the highest points per game average in a playoff series with 46.3. He was also a member of the first five NBA All-Defensive Teams (one second, followed by four firsts), which were introduced when he was 32 years old. Having played in nine NBA Finals, he is also the only player in NBA history to be named Finals MVP despite being on the losing team (1969). In 1980, West was inducted into the Hall of Fame and named to the NBA 35th Anniversary Team. West was named as one of the 50 Greatest Players in NBA History in 1996, and to the NBA 75th Anniversary Team in 2021.

After his playing career ended, West took over as head coach of the Lakers for three years. He led Los Angeles into the playoffs each year and earned a Western Conference finals berth once. Working as a player-scout for three years, West was named general manager of the Lakers before the 1982–83 NBA season. Under his reign, Los Angeles won six championship rings. In 2002, West became general manager of the Memphis Grizzlies and helped the franchise win their first-ever playoff berths. For his contributions, West won the NBA Executive of the Year Award twice: once as a Lakers manager (1995) and then as a Grizzlies manager (2004). He won two more NBA titles as a consultant with the Golden State Warriors (2015, 2017). In 2024, he was inducted to the Hall of Fame as a contributor to the sport as an executive and consultant.

== Early life ==
West was born into a poor household in Chelyan, West Virginia, on May 28, 1938. He was the fifth of six children of Cecil Sue West, a housewife, and Howard Stewart West, a coal mine electrician. West's father physically abused him, and West has stated that for a time he slept with a loaded shotgun under his bed out of fear that he might have to kill his father in self-defense.

West was an outgoing and aggressive child in his youth. In 1951, his older brother, David, was killed in action in the Korean War, and the grief turned him into a shy and introverted boy. Growing up, West spent his days hunting and fishing, but his main activity was shooting at a basketball hoop that a neighbor had nailed to his storage shed. West spent days shooting baskets from every possible angle, ignoring mud and snow in the backyard, as well as his mother's whippings when he came home hours late for dinner.

West attended East Bank High School in East Bank, West Virginia, from 1952 to 1956. During his first year, West was benched by his coach Duke Shaver due to his lack of height. Shaver emphasized the importance of conditioning and defense, which were lessons that the teenager appreciated. West soon became the captain of the freshman team, and during the summer of 1953 he grew to 6 ft 0 in (1.83 m). West eventually became the team's starting small forward, and he quickly established himself as one of the finest West Virginia high school players of his generation. He represented East Bank High School at a high level on and off the court, attending the 1955 session of Mountaineer Boys State and was named All-State from 1953 to 1956, then All-American in 1956 when he was West Virginia Player of the Year, becoming the state's first high-school player to score more than 900 points in a season, with an average of 32.2 points per game. West's mid-range jump shot became his trademark and he often used it to score while under pressure from opposing defenses. West led East Bank to a state championship on March 24 that year, prompting East Bank High School to change its name to "West Bank High School" every year on March 24 in honor of their basketball prodigy. This practice remained in effect until the school closed in 1999.

== College career ==
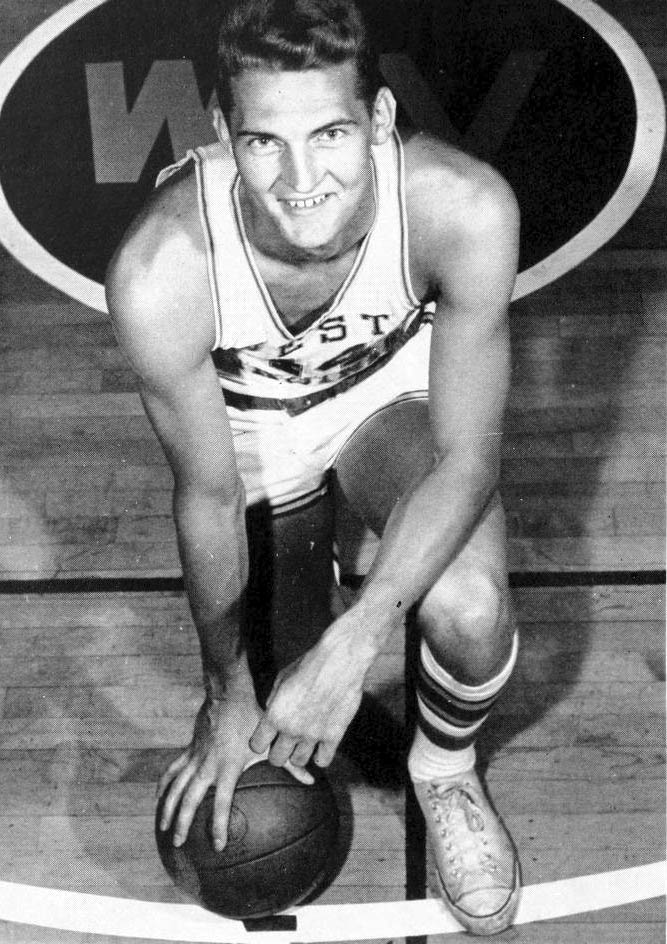
West from The Monticola, 1959

West graduated from East Bank High School in 1956, and more than 60 universities showed interest in him. He eventually chose to stay in his home state and attend West Virginia University (WVU), located in Morgantown. In his freshman year (1956–57), West was a member of the WVU freshman squad that achieved a perfect record of 17 straight wins over the course of the season; other team members included Jay Jacobs and Willie Akers. In his first varsity year under head coach Fred Schaus, West scored 17.8 points per game and averaged 11.1 rebounds; he also started in all 28 games while shooting 49.6% from the field and 73.2% from the free throw line. These performances earned him a multitude of honors, among them an All-American Third Team call-up, First Team All-Southern Conference, Southern Conference Tournament Most Valuable Player Award and First Team honors, Chuck Taylor–Converse Second-team All-American honors, and Associated Press and United Press International Third-team All-America honors. The Mountaineers went 26–2 that year, ending the season with a loss to Manhattan College in postseason tournament play.

During his junior year (1958–59), West scored 26.6 points per game and grabbed 12.3 rebounds per game. He tied the NCAA five-game tournament record of 160 points (32 points per game) and led all scorers and rebounders in every West Virginia game, including getting 28 points and 11 rebounds in a 71–70 loss to California in the final. West was named Most Outstanding Player of that year's Final Four. Further awards were All-America, Southern Conference Tournament MVP and Southern Conference Player of the Year and Athlete of the Year. He was also named to be a member of the U.S. Pan American Games basketball team that won the gold medal. West demonstrated his tenacity for the game in a match against the Kentucky Wildcats. He broke his nose during an incident in the game, but he continued to play despite intense pain and having to breathe through his mouth. He scored 19 points in the second half, leading WVU to an upset victory.

In his final collegiate season (1959–60), West enjoyed several career highs, such as scoring 29.3 points per game, a 134 season-assists, 16.5 rebounds per game, and a shooting average of 50.4% from the field, 76.6% from the free throw line. He was honored again with several awards: a call-up to the All-America selection, and being voted Southern Conference MVP. West's best performance was a game against Virginia, in which he grabbed 16 rebounds and scored 40 points. Moreover, during that final year, he had 30 double-doubles and fifteen 30-point games. In his collegiate career, West totaled 2,309 points and 1,240 rebounds. He averaged 24.8 points per game and 13.3 rebounds. As of 2011, West holds 12 WVU all-time records. West and Oscar Robertson co-captained the U.S. men's basketball team that won the gold medal at the 1960 Summer Olympics.

== Professional career ==
=== Los Angeles Lakers (1960–1974) ===
==== 1960–64: Mr. Inside and Mr. Outside ====
West made himself available for the 1960 NBA draft, and he was drafted with the second overall pick by the Minneapolis Lakers, shortly before the team relocated to Los Angeles. West became the first draft pick ever of the relocated franchise. His college coach, Schaus, was also hired that same season to coach the Lakers. He played West as a guard, in contrast to West's college days as a forward. The Lakers were captained by Hall-of-Fame forward Elgin Baylor, who was complemented by centers Jim Krebs and Ray Felix; forwards Rudy LaRusso and Tom Hawkins; and guards Rod Hundley (from West Virginia, like West), Frank Selvy, and Bobby Leonard. This team perennially had strong forwards and guards, but was constantly weak at center, giving them a disadvantage against the Boston Celtics with their Hall-of-Fame center, Bill Russell.

Initially, West felt odd in his new environment. He was a loner. His high-pitched voice earned him the nickname "Tweety Bird", and he spoke with such a thick Appalachian accent that his teammates also referred to him as "Zeke from Cabin Creek" (his nickname acknowledged his country roots, and his accent was so thick that he squeaked his nickname sheepishly – "Zeek from Cab'n Creek"). He soon impressed his colleagues with his defensive hustle, with his vertical jump—he could reach up 16 inches above the rim when he went up—and with his work ethic, spending countless extra hours working on his game. On the floor, West scored 17.6 points, grabbed 7.7 rebounds and dished 4.2 assists per game. West won Schaus's trust and, alternating with Hundley, Selvy, and Leonard, played 35 minutes per game and established himself as the Lakers' second scoring option. The NBA commented that the Lakers now had a potent one-two-punch—with "Mr. Inside" (the low-post scorer, Baylor) and "Mr. Outside" (the long-distance shooter, West). These performances soon earned West his first of 14 NBA All-Star Game call-ups.

West helped the Lakers improve from their previous 25-win season to 36 wins as they reached the 1961 NBA playoffs. They needed all five games to put away the Detroit Pistons but then lost to the St. Louis Hawks in seven games, losing the final game 105–103.

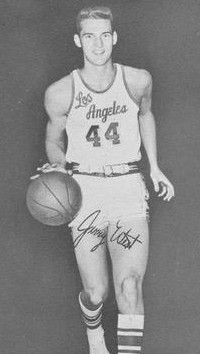
West in 1961

In the 1961–62 NBA season, Baylor was called up by the U.S. Army Reserves and could play only 48 games. West took over the role of team leader and established himself as the main Lakers scorer, averaging 30.8 points, 7.9 rebounds and 5.4 assists per game, winning All-NBA First Team honors. On January 17, 1962, West scored a career-high 63 points in a 129–121 win over the New York Knicks. West became known especially for hitting important late-game shots, and Lakers' announcer Chick Hearn named him "Mr. Clutch" a handle which stuck with West for his entire career.

The Lakers won 54 regular season games and secured a first-round bye in the 1962 NBA playoffs. They beat the Pistons four games to two to advance to the 1962 NBA Finals against the Boston Celtics. The teams split the first two games, and at the end of game 3 in Los Angeles, West tied the game at 115. The Celtics' Sam Jones inbounded the ball at half-court with three seconds left. West stole the ball, raced up court, and converted a running layup as the buzzer sounded. The Celtics tied the series in game 6 at three games apiece, and the teams headed to Boston for game 7. For most of the game, the Lakers trailed, but West and Frank Selvy hit several clutch baskets and tied the game at 100. Selvy then missed an open 8-foot shot which would have won the Lakers their first title. Baylor's tip-in attempt was thwarted by Sam Jones. In overtime, Jones scored several clutch baskets to ensure a 110–107 win for the Celtics. The 1962 NBA Finals would serve as the beginning of the greatest rivalry in NBA history.

In the 1962–63 NBA season, Baylor was back full-time. West averaged 27.8 points, 7 rebounds and 5.6 assists and was again NBA All-Star and All-NBA First-Team. He played only 55 regular season games, missing the last seven weeks due to a hamstring injury. Again, the Lakers reached the 1963 Finals, and again, they battled the Celtics. With West not yet in shape, Baylor and the Lakers fell back 3–2; then they succumbed in game 6 in front of their home crowd with a 112–109 loss. As the game ended, veteran Celtics playmaker Bob Cousy threw the ball high into the rafters of the Los Angeles Memorial Sports Arena.

In the following 1963–64 NBA season, West became the Lakers' scoring leader for the first time. His 28.7 points per game eclipsed the 25.4 by Baylor, who stated that he suffered from knee problems. The Lakers struggled during the entire season, winning only 42 games, and were beaten by the Hawks in five games during the first round of the 1964 NBA playoffs.

==== 1964–68: Leader of the Lakers ====
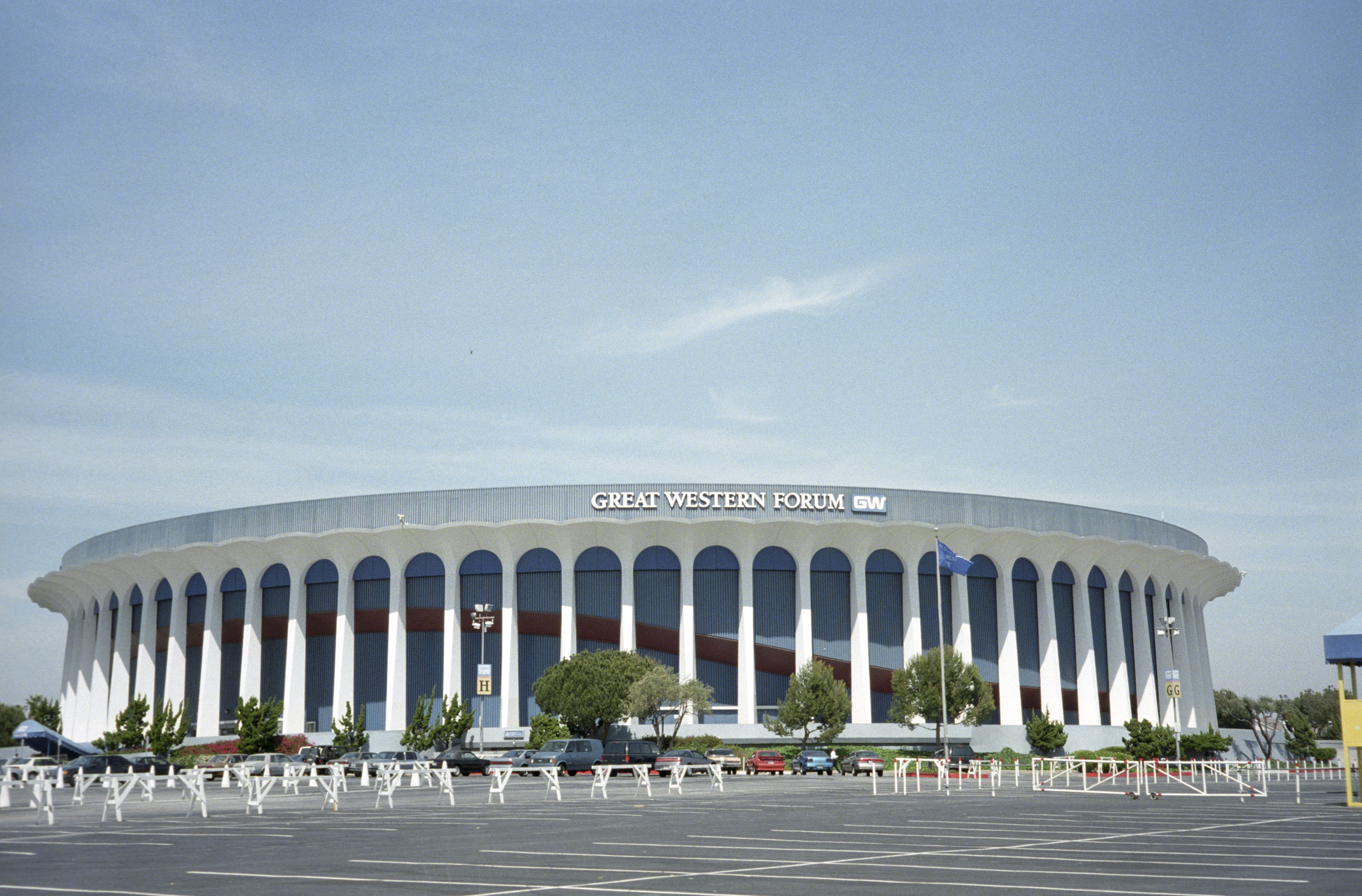
The Forum was the home of the Lakers from 1967 until 1999.

In the following 1964–65 NBA season, West averaged a then-career-high 31.0 points. After ending the regular season with 49 wins, the Lakers played the Baltimore Bullets in the first round of the 1965 NBA playoffs, but then team captain Baylor suffered a career-threatening knee injury. West spectacularly took over Baylor's leading role, as he scored 49 points and willed the shocked Lakers to the win. In game 2, Baltimore was unable to stop the Lakers guard, who scored 52 points, nearly half of Los Angeles' total, in the 118–115 win. The Bullets took their two home games, despite West scoring 44 and 48 points respectively, but in the decisive game 5 in Los Angeles, the guard helped beat the Bullets with 42 points in a close 117–115 win. West averaged 46.3 points per game, a figure that is still an NBA record. In the 1965 NBA Finals, the Celtics easily beat the short-handed Lakers, 4–1. In game 1, which Boston easily won, defensive Celtics guard K. C. Jones held West to only 26 points, and in game 2, West scored 45 points, but Boston still won 129–123. In game 3, West scored 49 points, and the Lakers finally won a game, but in games 4 and 5, they were beaten by double digits; in the last quarter of game 5, West missed 14 of 15 shots and could not prevent yet another Celtics win. Still, the Lakers guard finished the playoffs with 40.6 points per game.

In the 1965–66 NBA season, West averaged a career-best 31.3 points, along with 7.1 rebounds and 6.1 assists per game. He made an NBA record 840 free throws, and earned yet another pair of All-Star Team and All-NBA First Team nominations. Winning 45 games, the Lakers beat the St. Louis Hawks in a close seven-game series, and yet again met the Boston Celtics in the 1966 NBA Finals. West was assisted by Baylor, who was a self-estimated "75 percent" of his pre-injury self, The two long-standing rivals split the first six games, with West's usual scoring dominance countered by Celtics forward John Havlicek, whose size and speed created serious mismatch problems for the Lakers. In game 7, West and Baylor shot a combined three of 18 in the first half, and the Lakers fell far behind; they willed themselves back to a close 95–93 with four seconds left, but the Celtics ran the clock out and the Lakers were denied yet again.

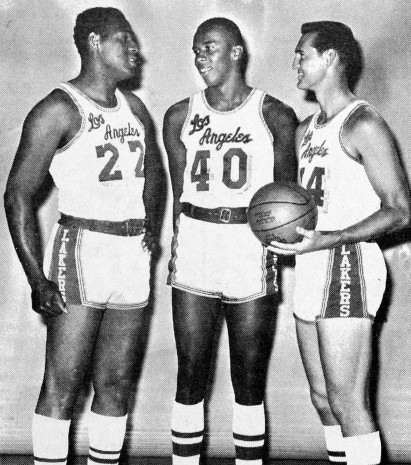
West (right) in 1966, with Elgin Baylor (left) and Jerry Chambers (center)

The 1966–67 NBA season saw West playing only 66 regular season games due to injury; his averages fell slightly to 28 points, 5.9 rebounds and 6.8 assists per game. The Lakers had a disappointing season, winning only 36 games and getting swept by the San Francisco Warriors in the first round of the 1967 NBA playoffs. Veteran coach Fred Schaus retired, and Butch Van Breda Kolff took over; under his reign, the Lakers won 52 games in the 1967–68 NBA season in their first season in The Forum. The 52 wins were accumulated despite West playing only 51 regular season games due to injury and scoring 26.3 points, the lowest average since his rookie year: after being a First-Teamer for six times en bloc, he only made the All-NBA Second Team.

In the 1968 NBA playoffs, the Lakers beat the Chicago Bulls and the Warriors to set up yet another Lakers–Celtics NBA Finals; it was considered a match of size versus speed, as the Lakers had nobody to guard Celtics coach/center Bill Russell or forward John Havlicek close to the basket, but the Celtics in return had difficulties guarding prolific Lakers' outside shooters Baylor, West and fellow guard Gail Goodrich. In game 1, West only hit seven of 24 shots, and the Lakers lost 107–101, but they evened out the series at two games each. But West, who had scored 38 points in a game 4 win, had sprained his ankle, and did not play at full strength the rest of the series. In game 5, an injured West scored 35 points, but Boston won by 3 points. In game 6, Havlicek shredded the Lakers with 40 points, and after yet another Finals loss to Boston, West commented that the Lakers lost two games they should have won: "We gave them the first game, and we gave them the fifth. But I take nothing from them... They're all that way on the Celtics, and you can't teach it."

==== 1968–71: Arrival of Wilt Chamberlain ====
On July 9, 1968, the Lakers made a trade that brought reigning NBA Most Valuable Player Wilt Chamberlain of the Philadelphia 76ers to Los Angeles at the beginning of the 1968–69 NBA season. To get the center, the Lakers traded West's backcourt partner Archie Clark, starting center Darrall Imhoff and backup forward Jerry Chambers to Philadelphia. Coach Van Breda Kolff was concerned about the drain at the guard positions after losing Clark, and especially after losing Goodrich in the expansion draft to the Phoenix Suns. He only had diminutive, defensively weak Johnny Egan left next to West. While West himself got on well with his new teammate, Chamberlain often argued with team captain Elgin Baylor and had a poor relationship with Van Breda Kolff. Van Breda Kolff pejoratively called Chamberlain "The Load", and later complained that Chamberlain was egotistical, never respected him, too often slacked off in practice and focused too much on his statistics. In return, the center blasted Van Breda Kolff as "the dumbest and worst coach ever". There was an altercation in which Chamberlain was about to punch Van Breda Kolff before Baylor had intervened. West was disturbed by locker room tension; used to playing on teams with good chemistry, his quality of play became erratic, and his scoring average of 25.9 points was his lowest since his rookie season. He made the Second Team of the inaugural All-Defensive Team.

In the 1969 NBA playoffs, the 55-win Lakers defeated the Atlanta Hawks and the San Francisco Warriors, setting up the sixth finals series versus Boston in eight years. Before game 1, West privately complained to Bill Russell of exhaustion, but then the Lakers guard scored 53 points on Boston in a close two-point win. The Lakers also took game 2, with West scoring 41 points. In game 3, Russell opted to double-team West, and the guard's exhaustion began to show: West twice asked to be subbed for longer periods, and both times the Lakers fell back by double digits and finally lost by six points. Game 4 saw Celtics guard Sam Jones hit an off-balance buzzer beater to tie the series, but in game 5, the Lakers struck back and won by 13 points. West – who scored 39 points and by far led all players in scoring during the entire series – lunged for a meaningless late-game ball and seriously pulled his hamstring: it was immediately visible that the injury would not heal until the end of the series. Limping, he scored 26 points in game 6, but the Celtics won 99–90 with a strong Bill Russell, who held Chamberlain to only 8 points in the entire game. In game 7, Lakers owner Jack Kent Cooke had put up thousands of balloons in the rafters of the Forum in Los Angeles. This display of arrogance motivated the Celtics and angered West. The Lakers trailed the entire game and were behind 91–76 after three quarters, but powered by a limping West, the Lakers closed the gap to 103–102 with two minutes to go and had the ball. But West committed costly turnovers and Los Angeles lost the game 108–106 despite a triple-double of 42 points, 13 rebounds and 12 assists from West, who became the only recipient of the NBA Finals Most Valuable Player Award from the losing team. After the loss West was seen as the ultimate tragic hero: after the game, Bill Russell held his hand, and John Havlicek said: "I love you, Jerry".

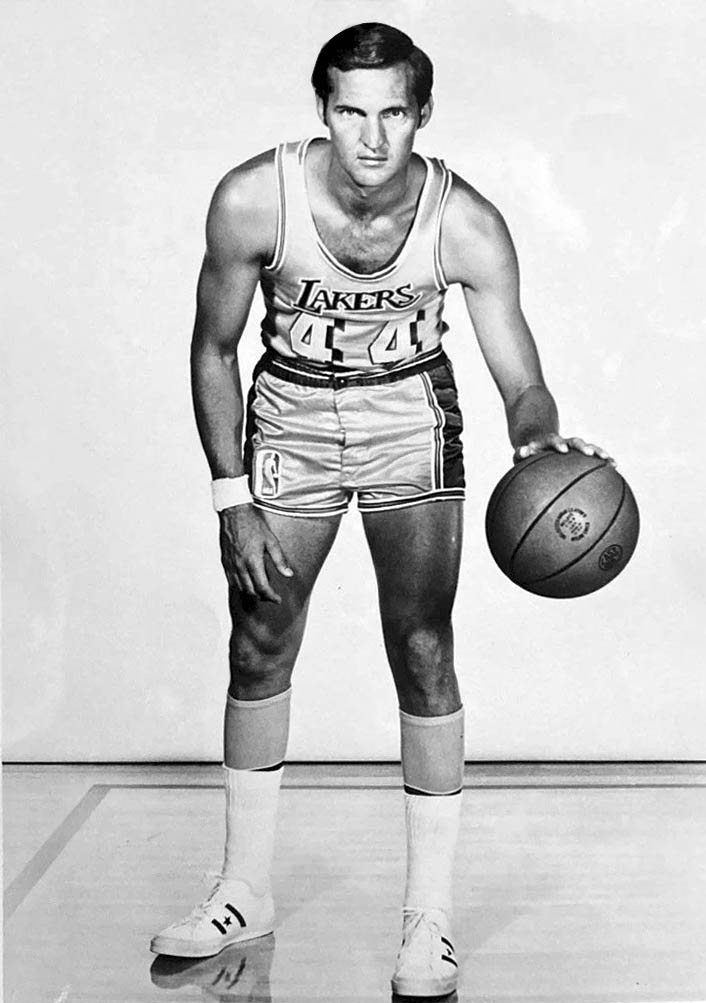
West in 1970

In the 1969–70 NBA season under new coach Joe Mullaney, the Lakers' season began with a shock when Wilt Chamberlain seriously injured his knee and missed practically the whole regular season. As after Baylor's injury years before, West stepped into the void, leading the NBA in scoring average with 31.2 points per game, and averaging 4.6 rebounds and 7.5 assists per game, earning him his first of four All-Defensive First Team votes and another All-NBA First Team berth after two Second Team years. The Lakers won 46 games, and in the 1970 NBA playoffs, they narrowly beat the Phoenix Suns in seven games and swept the Hawks in four, setting up the first NBA Finals between the Lakers and the rugged New York Knicks, led by Hall-of-Famers such as Willis Reed, Dave DeBusschere, Bill Bradley, and Walt Frazier. The Lakers and Knicks split the first two games, with both games respectively decided by centers Reed and the still-hobbling Chamberlain. In game 3, DeBusschere hit a mid-range jump shot with three seconds left to put the Knicks ahead 102–100, and the Lakers had no time-outs left. Chamberlain inbounded the ball to West, who raced past Walt Frazier and threw up a 60-foot shot. Frazier later commented: "The man's crazy. He looks determined. He thinks it's going in!" West incredibly connected, and this basket was later called one of the greatest moments ever by the NBA. As the three-point line had not been introduced yet, the shot just tied the game. In overtime, West sprained his left hand and missed all five of his shots, and the Knicks won 111–108. In game 4, the guard scored 37 points and 18 assists, and the Lakers won. More frustration awaited West in game 5, when Reed pulled his thigh muscle and seemed out for the series; instead of capitalizing on a double-digit lead and reeling off an easy win, the Lakers committed 19 second-half turnovers, and the two main scorers Chamberlain and West shot the ball only three and two times, respectively, in the entire second half and lost 107–100 in what was called one of the greatest comebacks in NBA Finals history. After Chamberlain scored 45 points and West 31 points plus 13 assists in a series-equalizing 135–113 Lakers win, the Lakers seemed favorites prior to game 7. West had also injured his right hand and taken several manual injections, and Reed hobbled up court before game 7 – the Knicks center scored the first four points, and inspired his team to one of the most famous playoff upsets of all time. With his injured hands, West still hit nine of his 19 shots, but was outplayed by Walt Frazier, who scored 36 points and 19 assists and was credited with several crucial steals on Lakers guard Dick Garrett.

In the 1970–71 NBA season, the Lakers reacquired Gail Goodrich, who came back from the Phoenix Suns after playing for the Lakers until 1968. At age 32, West averaged 26.9 points, 4.6 rebounds and 9.5 assists, and helped the Lakers win 46 games and make the 1971 NBA playoffs. After losing Elgin Baylor to an Achilles tendon rupture that effectively ended his career, West himself injured his knee and was out for the season; the short-handed Lakers lost the Western Conference finals in five games to the championship-bound Milwaukee Bucks, who were led by freshly-crowned Most Valuable Player Lew Alcindor (later known as Kareem Abdul-Jabbar) and veteran Hall-of-Fame guard Oscar Robertson.

==== 1971–74: Late success and twilight years ====
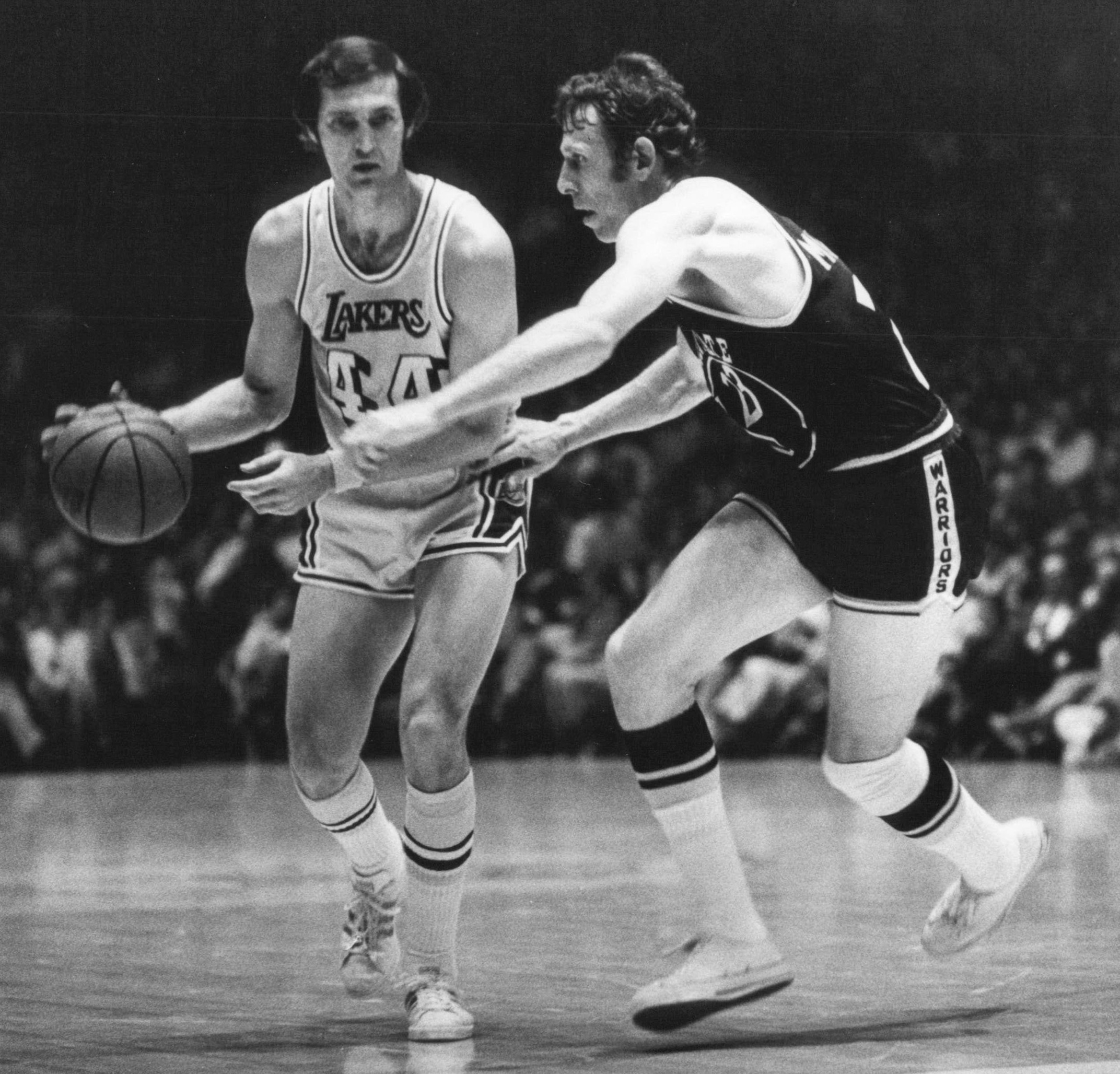
Jerry West (with the ball) in 1971

Before the 1971–72 NBA season, West was smarting from his frequent injuries and losses and considered retirement. The Lakers hired former Celtics star guard and future Hall-of-Fame coach Bill Sharman as head coach. Although injured captain Elgin Baylor ended his career, the Lakers had a season for the ages. The team was powered by Sharman's emphasis on tough defense and fast break offense, and Los Angeles embarked on an unprecedented 33 game win streak, en route to a then-record 69 wins in the regular season. West himself contributed with 25.8 points and led the league with a career-high 9.7 assists per game. He was named All-Star, All-NBA and All-Defense First Teamer and voted 1972 All-Star Game MVP. Prior to the Lakers' 33 game team win streak, in which West started every game, the Lakers played 5 games in which West was injured and did not play. The Lakers lost 3 of the 5 games. Prior to that, West started 8 straight games in which the Lakers won each game. As a result, Jerry West had a personal win streak of 41 games in which he started. This is the longest such personal win streak in major American professional sports history.

In the postseason, the Lakers defeated the Chicago Bulls in a four-game sweep, then went on to face the Milwaukee Bucks, and defeated them in six games. In the 1972 NBA Finals, the Lakers again met the New York Knicks. Although West suffered a terrible shooting slump during games 1 and 2, the Lakers tied the series at one win each, and in game 3, he scored 21 points and helped the Lakers win and take a 2-1 series lead. In this game, he reached 4,002 playoff points, which set an all-time NBA record. After winning game 4 due to a superb outing from Wilt Chamberlain, West scored 23 points and dished out 9 assists in game 5, helping the Lakers to win the game and the NBA championship. The championship was West's first-ever NBA title. West conceded that he had played a terrible series and credited the team for the success. Years later he said "I played terrible basketball in the Finals, and we won... It was particularly frustrating because I was playing so poorly that the team overcame me. Maybe that's what a team is all about."

Having overcome this long term frustration, West entered his 13th NBA year. In the 1972–73 NBA season, Goodrich took over as the principal scorer, and West was now primarily again a playmaking guard. He averaged 22.8 points per game but also averaged 8.8 assists and again was a first team selection on the All-Star, All-NBA, and All-Defense teams. The Lakers won 60 games and reached the 1973 NBA Finals against the New York Knicks. In game 1 West scored 24 points before fouling out with three minutes left; Los Angeles still won game 1 115–112. The Knicks took games 2 and 3, and West strained both of his hamstrings. In game 4, the shorthanded Lakers were no match for New York, and in game 5, both the injured West and Hairston had subpar performances, and despite Chamberlain's 23 points and 21 rebounds, the Lakers lost 102–93 and the series.

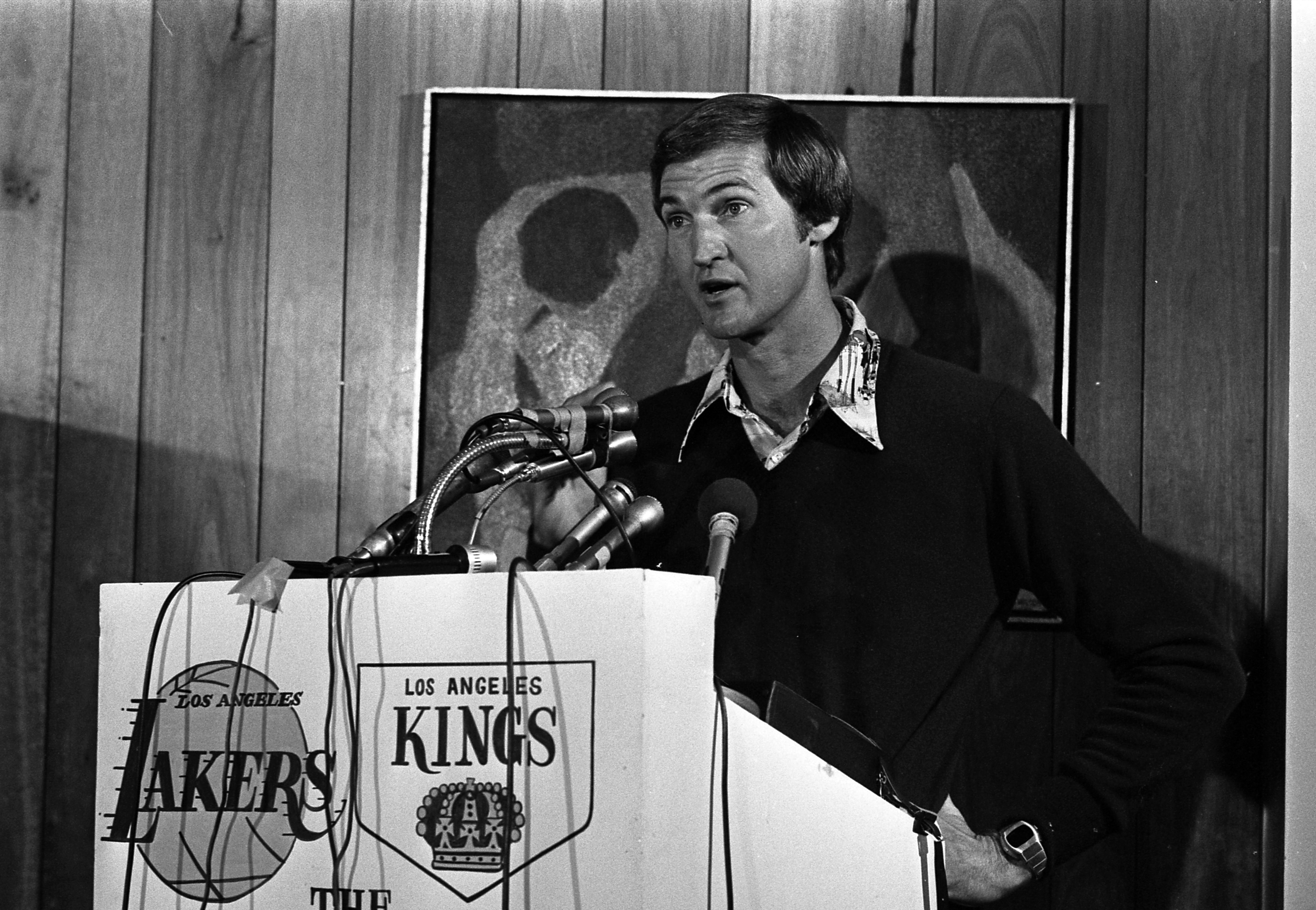
West announcing his retirement from playing in 1974

The 1973–74 NBA season was to be West's last as a player. Now 36 years old, the veteran guard averaged 20.3 points, 3.7 rebounds and 6.6 assists per game. In two newly introduced statistics, steals and blocks, he was credited with 2.6 steals and 0.7 blocks per game. Despite playing only 31 games due to a strained groin muscle, West was still regarded as an elite guard, earning another selection for his final All-Star Game. Without Chamberlain, who had ended his NBA career, the Lakers won 47 games but lost in five games in the playoffs to Kareem Abdul-Jabbar and the Milwaukee Bucks. West took on the role of team captain for the first time after deferring to Chamberlain in 1972. However, in his last season West only played 14 minutes in the playoffs, possibly due to rumored contractual frustration with Jack Kent Cooke and another groin injury. After this loss, West retired and filed a suit for unpaid back wages. West wanted to renegotiate his contract and keep playing. He said Cooke "basically told my agent to go to hell. I felt I was deceived. When you feel that you're deceived you don't want any part of the organization that deceived you. I could've played another very good year. Every athlete says that. But I could've, and I knew I could've. But I could never have played for the Lakers again, and I wasn't going to play for anybody else." At the time of his departure, West had scored more points than any other Laker in franchise history.

== Coaching career ==
=== Los Angeles Lakers (1976–1979) ===
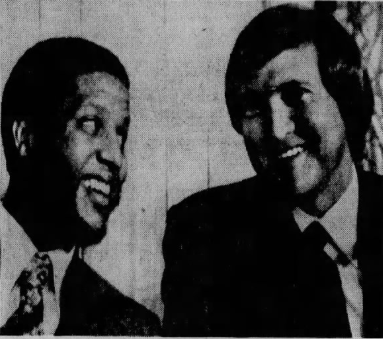
West with new Lakers acquisition Jamaal Wilkes in 1977

Lakers owner Jack Kent Cooke was known for a keen eye identifying leadership and teaching qualities (he also gave Hall of Famers Sparky Anderson and Joe Gibbs their first managerial/head coaching positions) and asked West to coach and participate in player personnel decisions. In the 1976–77 season, West became coach of the Los Angeles Lakers. In three years, he led the Lakers and star center Kareem Abdul-Jabbar to a 145–101 record, making the playoffs all three seasons and reaching the Western Conference finals in 1977.

== Executive career ==
=== Los Angeles Lakers (1979–2000) ===
After his coaching stint, West worked as a scout for three years before becoming general manager of the Lakers before the 1982–83 season, when he succeeded Bill Sharman. West helped to build the great 1980s Lakers dynasty, also known as Showtime, which brought five championship rings (1980, 1982, 1985, 1987, and 1988) to Los Angeles.

Those championship-winning Lakers were coached by Pat Riley, and featured superstar players Magic Johnson, Kareem Abdul-Jabbar and James Worthy. After a slump in the early 1990s, West rebuilt the team of coach Del Harris around center Vlade Divac, forward Cedric Ceballos, and guard Nick Van Exel, which won 48 games, and went to the Western Conference semifinals. In 1995, West received his first Executive of the Year Award for his role in turning the Lakers around.

West continued to propel the Lakers to championship contender status by trading Divac for the draft rights to Kobe Bryant (1996), by signing free agent center Shaquille O'Neal (also in 1996), and by signing six-time NBA champion Phil Jackson as a coach (1999). West departed from the Lakers at the end of the 1999–2000 season after he won his sixth championship as a Lakers' executive, due to a power struggle with head coach Phil Jackson. West had laid down the foundation of the Lakers' three-peat as they defended their NBA championship in 2001 and 2002.

=== Memphis Grizzlies (2002–2007) ===
In 2002, West became the general manager of the Memphis Grizzlies. He explained his decision with the desire for exploring something new: "After being a part of the Lakers success for so many years, I have always wondered how it would be to build a winning franchise that has not experienced much success. I want to help make a difference." West's Memphis stint was not as spectacular as his Los Angeles stint, but he turned a franchise which was about to be sold into a reliable playoffs team, making few trades but getting the maximum from the players he had available (such as Pau Gasol, James Posey, and Jason Williams) and signing coach Hubie Brown, who became Coach of the Year in 2004. West himself won his second NBA Executive of the Year Award in the same year. In 2007, West retired as a Grizzlies general manager and turned over managing duties to Chris Wallace.

=== Golden State Warriors (2011–2017) ===
On May 19, 2011, West joined the Golden State Warriors as an executive board member, reporting directly to new owners Joe Lacob and Peter Guber. This role also came with an undisclosed minority ownership stake in the team. In 2015, the Warriors won their first championship in 40 years; the championship was the seventh earned by West while serving as a team executive. He earned his eighth in the 2017 NBA Finals.

=== Los Angeles Clippers (2017–2024) ===
On June 1, 2017, West publicly stated that he would have been interested in returning to the Lakers, but nothing materialized as they hired Magic Johnson and Rob Pelinka to run the team. On June 14, West announced that he would go to the Los Angeles Clippers as an executive board member and consultant. Clippers coach Doc Rivers floated the idea of West joining the organization during the 2016 season. West referred to leaving Golden State as "one of the saddest days of his life" but was excited to find a new challenge. On December 17, 2020, it was reported that West and the Los Angeles Clippers were under investigation by the NBA following a lawsuit filed by John Wilkes against the Clippers over the recruitment of Kawhi Leonard to the team.

== NBA career statistics ==
Legend
GP	Games played	GS	Games started	MPG	Minutes per game
FG%	Field goal percentage	3P%	3-point field goal percentage	FT%	Free throw percentage
RPG	Rebounds per game	APG	Assists per game	SPG	Steals per game
BPG	Blocks per game	PPG	Points per game	**Bold**	Career high
†	Won an NBA championship	*	Led the league

=== Regular season ===
Year	Team	GP	GS	MPG	FG%	3P%	FT%	RPG	APG	SPG	BPG	PPG
1960–61	L.A. Lakers	**79***	—	35.4	.419	—	.666	7.7	4.2	—	—	17.6
1961–62	L.A. Lakers	75	—	41.2	.445	—	.769	**7.9**	5.4	—	—	30.8
1962–63	L.A. Lakers	55	—	39.3	.461	—	.778	7.0	5.6	—	—	27.1
1963–64	L.A. Lakers	72	—	40.4	.484	—	.832	6.0	5.6	—	—	28.7
1964–65	L.A. Lakers	74	—	41.4	.497	—	.821	6.0	4.9	—	—	31.0
1965–66	L.A. Lakers	**79**	—	40.7	.473	—	.860	7.1	6.1	—	—	**31.3**
1966–67	L.A. Lakers	66	—	40.5	.464	—	**.878**	5.9	6.8	—	—	28.7
1967–68	L.A. Lakers	51	—	37.6	**.514**	—	.811	5.8	6.1	—	—	26.3
1968–69	L.A. Lakers	61	—	39.2	.471	—	.821	4.3	6.9	—	—	25.9
1969–70	L.A. Lakers	74	—	**42.0**	.497	—	.824	4.6	7.5	—	—	31.2*
1970–71	L.A. Lakers	69	—	41.2	.494	—	.832	4.6	9.5	—	—	26.9
1971–72†	L.A. Lakers	77	—	38.6	.477	—	.814	4.2	**9.7***	—	—	25.8
1972–73	L.A. Lakers	69	—	35.7	.479	—	.805	4.2	8.8	—	—	22.8
1973–74	L.A. Lakers	31	—	31.2	.447	—	.833	3.7	6.6	**2.6**	**.7**	20.3
Career		932	—	39.2	.474	—	.814	5.8	6.7	2.6	.7	27.0
All-Star		12	11	28.4	.453	—	.720	3.9	4.6	—	—	13.3

=== Playoffs ===
Year	Team	GP	GS	MPG	FG%	3P%	FT%	RPG	APG	SPG	BPG	PPG
1961	L.A. Lakers	12	—	38.4	.490	—	.726	**8.7**	5.3	—	—	22.9
1962	L.A. Lakers	13	—	42.8	.465	—	.807	6.8	4.4	—	—	31.5
1963	L.A. Lakers	13	—	41.4	.503	—	.740	8.2	4.7	—	—	27.8
1964	L.A. Lakers	5	—	41.2	.496	—	.792	7.2	3.4	—	—	31.2
1965	L.A. Lakers	11	—	42.7	.442	—	**.890**	5.7	5.3	—	—	**40.6**
1966	L.A. Lakers	14	—	44.2	.518	—	.872	6.3	5.6	—	—	34.2
1967	L.A. Lakers	1	—	1.0	—	—	—	1.0	.0	—	—	—
1968	L.A. Lakers	15	—	41.5	**.527**	—	.781	5.4	5.5	—	—	30.8
1969	L.A. Lakers	**18**	—	42.1	.463	—	.804	3.9	7.5	—	—	30.9
1970	L.A. Lakers	**18**	—	**46.1**	.469	—	.802	3.7	8.4	—	—	31.2
1972†	L.A. Lakers	15	—	40.5	.376	—	.830	4.9	**8.9**	—	—	22.9
1973	L.A. Lakers	17	—	37.5	.449	—	.780	4.5	7.8	—	—	23.6
1974	L.A. Lakers	1	—	14.0	.222	—	—	2.0	1.0	.0	.0	4.0
Career		153	—	41.3	.469	—	.805	5.6	6.3	.0	.0	29.1

== Head coaching record ==
Legend
Regular season	G	Games coached	W	Games won	L	Games lost	W–L %	Win–loss %
Playoffs	PG	Playoff games	PW	Playoff wins	PL	Playoff losses	PW–L %	Playoff win–loss %

Team	Year	G	W	L	W–L%	Finish	PG	PW	PL	PW–L%	Result
L.A. Lakers	1976–77	82	53	29	.646	1st in Pacific	11	4	7	.364	Lost in conference finals
L.A. Lakers	1977–78	82	45	37	.549	4th in Pacific	3	1	2	.333	Lost in first round
L.A. Lakers	1978–79	82	47	35	.573	3rd in Pacific	8	3	5	.375	Lost in conference semifinals
Career		246	145	101	.589		22	8	14	.364	

== Player profile ==
West was an all-around combo guard who could take the playmaking roles of a point guard and score like a shooting guard, while being equally strong on offense and defense. He had a jump shot with a release the NBA lauded as "lightning quick", and was known for making baskets late in the game, earning him the nickname "Mr. Clutch". Having played forward early in his career, he was also a capable rebounder, and gifted with long arms, quick hands, and strong defensive instincts. He was also described as one of the best ballhawks, man-to-man defenders and shot blockers among NBA guards: when the All-Defensive Teams were introduced in 1969, he made every one of them until his career ended in 1974. "He stole more than anybody, although they didn't keep records on it then", said Sharman. Contemporaries were most impressed by his work ethic, practicing, shooting and, rarely satisfying himself.

West's all-round game and attitude is maybe best expressed in his statistically most spectacular game: he once was credited with 44 points (16 of 17 shots from the field, 12 of 12 free throw attempts) with 12 rebounds, 12 assists, and (unofficially counted) 10 blocked shots, thus scoring a non-official ultra-rare quadruple double. He commented: "Defensively, from a team standpoint, I didn't feel I played very well. Very rarely was I satisfied with how I played."

== Legacy ==
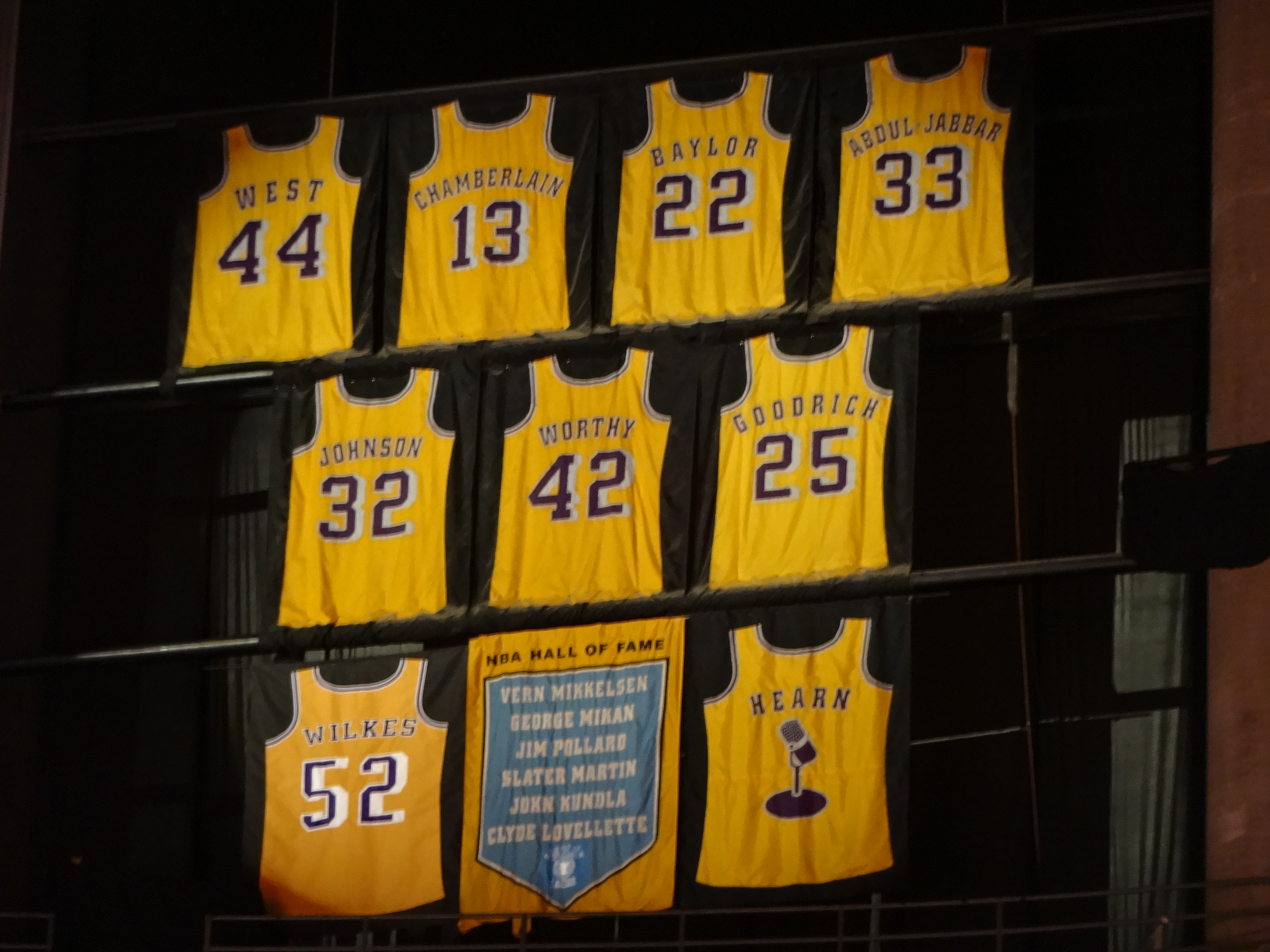
West's No. 44 jersey (upper left) was retired in 1983 and hangs in the rafters of Crypto.com Arena.

West ended his playing career with 14 All-Star, 12 All-NBA Team and five All-Defensive Team selections, and scored 25,192 points, 6,238 assists and 5,366 rebounds in 932 games, translating to an average of 27.0 points, 6.7 assists and 5.8 rebounds per game. Among retired players, only Michael Jordan, Elgin Baylor and Wilt Chamberlain surpass his 27.0 points per game average. He led the Lakers in scoring in seven seasons, and is the league leader in career scoring in the NBA Finals (1,679). In 1979, West was elected into the Naismith Memorial Basketball Hall of Fame, and the Lakers retired his No. 44 jersey in 1983. He was also elected to the Basketball Hall of Fame as a member of the 1960 U.S. Olympic team in 2010 and as a contributor in 2024; his induction as a contributor honors his tenure as a general manager and consultant. West was the first person to be enshrined in the Basketball Hall of Fame as both a player and a contributor, and is also the first three-time inductee. In 1990, he was inducted into the National High School Hall of Fame.

The NBA logo, which was designed in 1969, incorporates a silhouette based on a photograph of West, according to its designer Alan Siegel. In March 2008, ESPN voted West the third greatest shooting guard of all time. In 2022, to commemorate the NBA's 75th Anniversary The Athletic ranked their top 75 players of all time, and named West as the 14th greatest player in NBA history. As a coach, West led the Lakers into three consecutive playoff campaigns, and then went on to win eight NBA championships as an executive and consultant. West built the 1980s Lakers dynasty under coach Pat Riley and players Magic Johnson, Kareem Abdul-Jabbar, and James Worthy and the 2000s under coach Phil Jackson and players Shaquille O'Neal and Kobe Bryant. He was a member of Golden State's front office when the Warriors won titles in 2015 and 2017.

In the summer of 2000, the city of Morgantown, West Virginia, and West Virginia Governor Cecil Underwood, dedicated the road outside of the West Virginia University Coliseum, "Jerry West Boulevard". The same road is shared on the south end of Morgantown with Don Knotts Boulevard, in honor of another WVU alumnus. Also, on November 26, 2005, his number 44 became the first basketball number to be retired by West Virginia University and on February 17, 2007, a bronze statue created by sculptor Jamie Lester was installed outside of the WVU Coliseum. On February 17, 2011, a statue of West was unveiled outside Staples Center at the Star Plaza in Los Angeles, California. On September 5, 2019, West received the Presidential Medal of Freedom from President Donald Trump in recognition of his contributions to the sport.

== Personal life ==
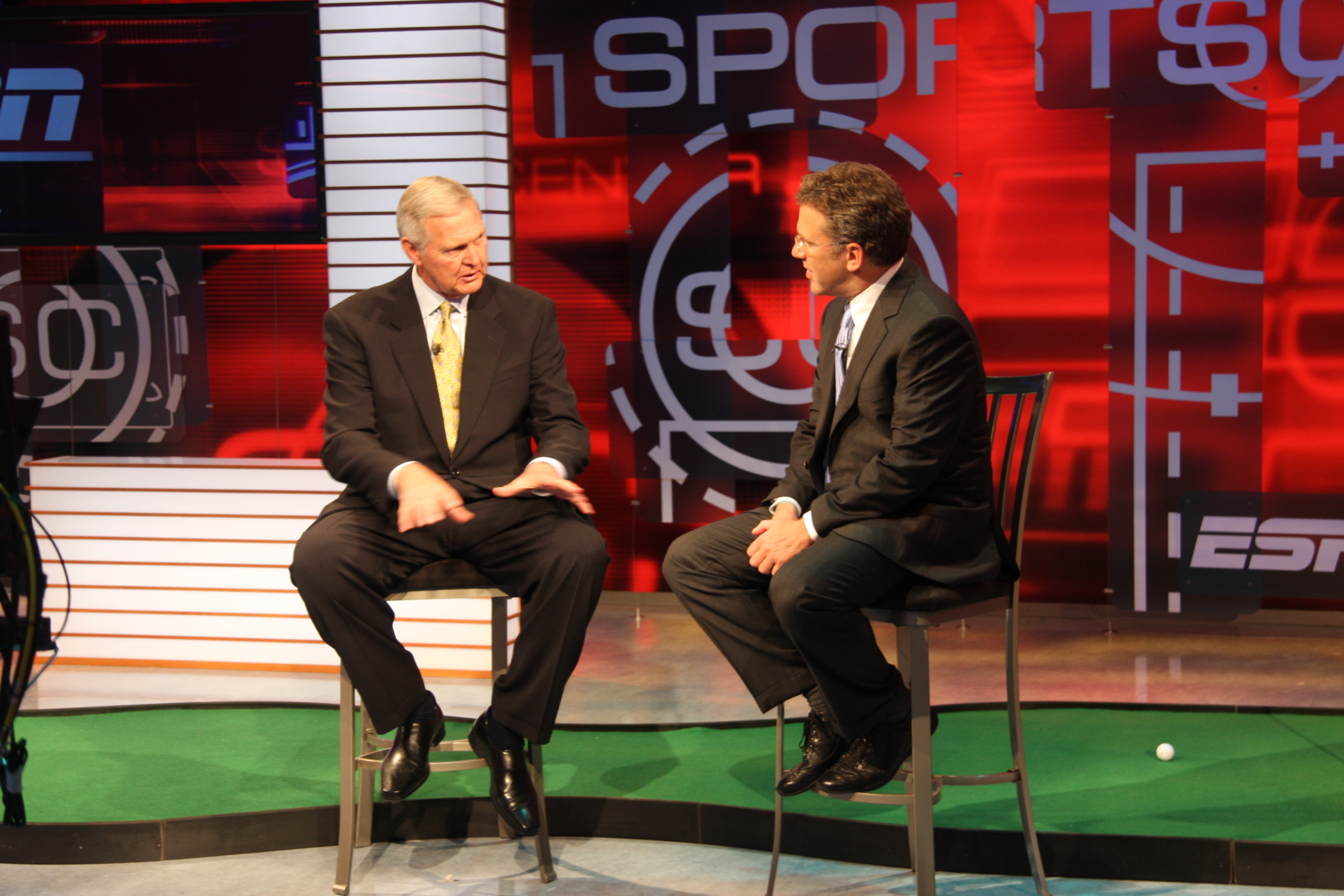
West interviewed on ESPN Los Angeles in 2010

West married his college sweetheart Martha Jane Kane in April 1960 in Morgantown; they divorced in 1976. They had three sons: David, Mark, and Michael.

Jerry married his second wife, Kristine "Karen" Bua, in 1978. They had two sons, Ryan and Jonnie. Ryan is an executive with the Detroit Pistons. Jonnie played guard for West's college team, the West Virginia Mountaineers, is director of Basketball Operations for the Golden State Warriors, and married professional golfer Michelle Wie in 2019.

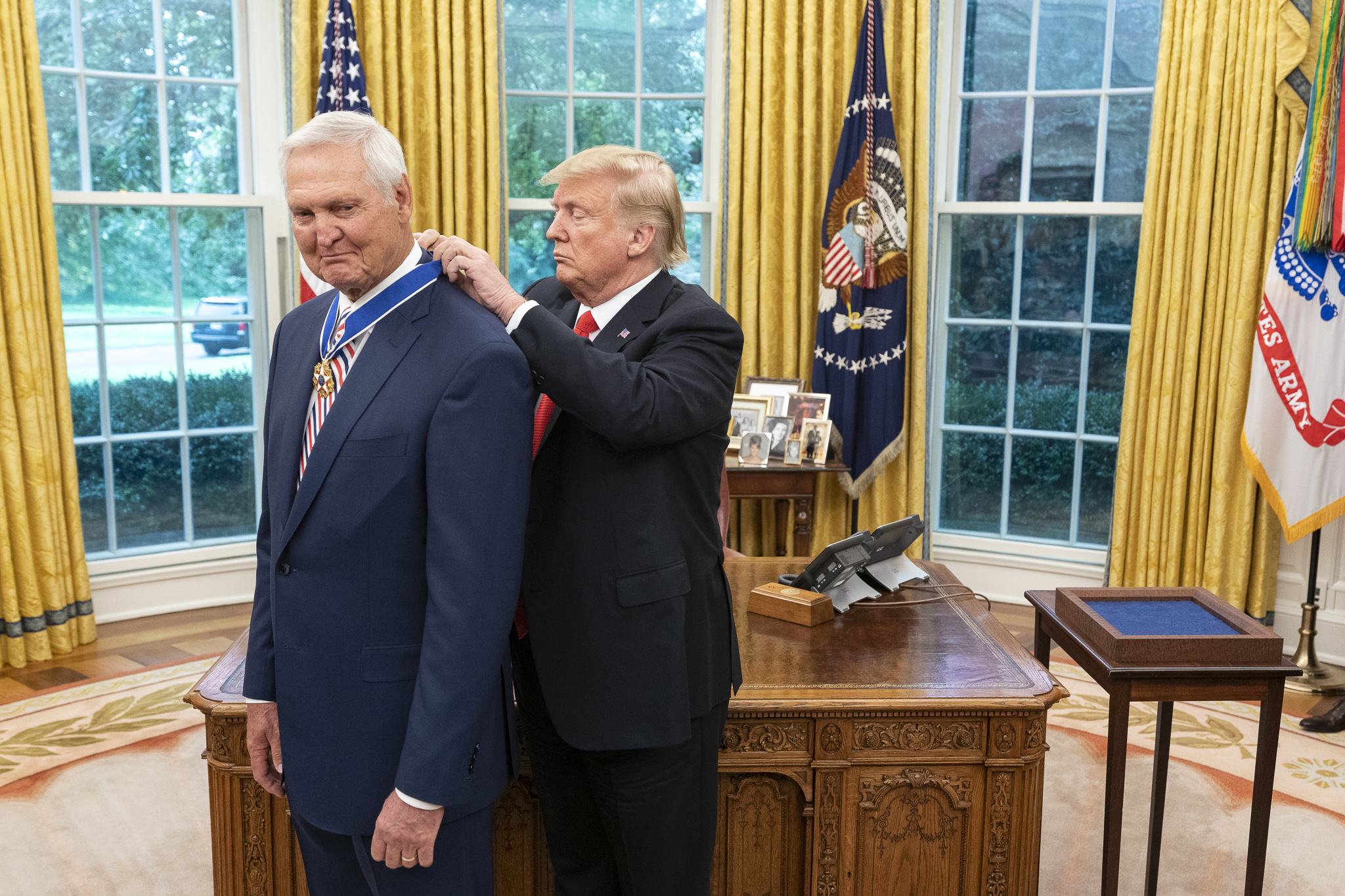
West receives the Presidential Medal of Freedom from President Donald Trump in the Oval Office in 2019

West was often described as an introverted and nervous character, but he also drew the highest praise for his uncompromising work ethic. Regarding his shyness, WVU roommate Jody Gardner testified that West never dated in his entire freshman year, and Lakers coach Fred Schaus once recalled two weeks when his guard never said a word. Apart from being shy, West was always restless: Schaus described him as a "bundle of nerves", Celtics contemporary Bob Cousy said West "was always on the move", and fellow Laker and Mountaineer Rod Hundley testified that during bar visits, West would quickly squirm and demand to go elsewhere before everybody else had settled. His first wife Martha Kane recalled that her husband often had difficulties opening up to her. After a big loss, the Wests would drive home and she would try to console him, but West would say "get out" at the home porch and drive away—an experience that "killed" her as a wife.

Early in his career, West's West Virginian roots made him a target for some mild jeering. He spoke with a high-pitched voice that became even shriller when he became excited so that Lakers captain Elgin Baylor dubbed West "Tweety Bird". His Appalachian accent was so thick that one coach interrupted him and asked him to speak English. Baylor once commented: "Rumors are safe with you, Tweety Bird. You pass them on, but nobody can understand you."

West was also regarded for his extreme mental toughness and his exemplary work ethic. The NBA said he had "obsessive perfectionism, unabashed confidence, and an uncompromising will to win... a level of intensity so high it could melt lead". Lakers broadcaster Chick Hearn once said: "He took a loss harder than any player I've ever known. He would sit by himself and stare into space. A loss just ripped his guts out." Even before his sole championship in 1972, the Lakers held a "Jerry West Night", and eleven-time NBA champion and perennial rival Bill Russell appeared and said: "Jerry, you are, in every sense of the word, truly a champion... If I could have one wish granted, it would be that you would always be happy."

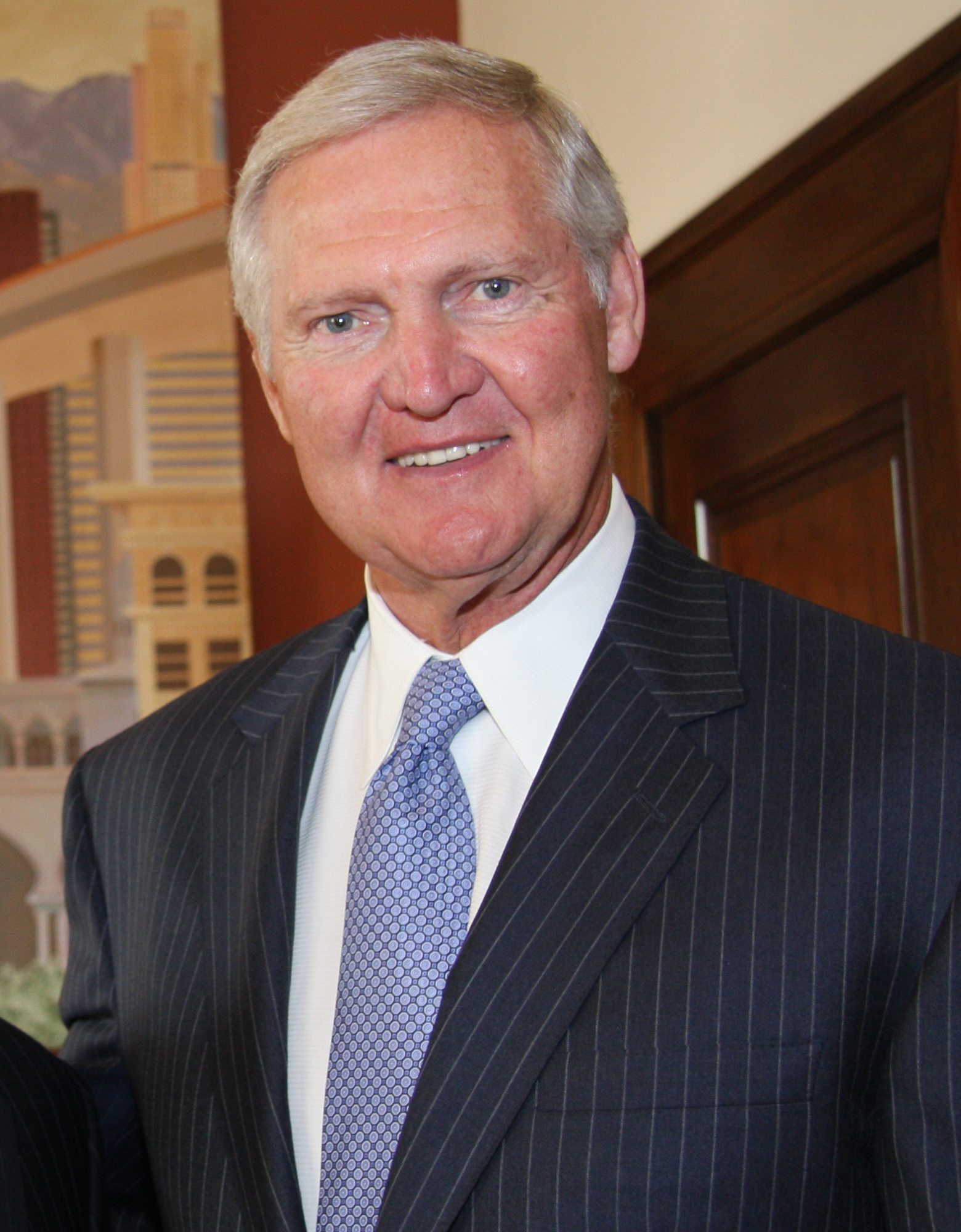
West in 2010

In 2011, West and bestselling author Jonathan Coleman wrote a memoir entitled West by West: My Charmed, Tormented Life. The book had tremendous critical acclaim and became an instant New York Times bestseller. During an interview on HBO's Real Sports with Bryant Gumbel, West revealed that as a child he was the victim of physical abuse from his father and has suffered from depression ever since.

West was portrayed in the 2022 HBO docudrama series Winning Time: The Rise of the Lakers Dynasty as a temperamental, foul-mouthed executive, prone to angry outbursts and mood swings. On April 19, 2022, West demanded a retraction from the network within two weeks for the "cruel" and "deliberately false" depiction, as played by actor Jason Clarke.

=== Death ===
West died in Los Angeles on June 12, 2024, at the age of 86. A moment of silence was held in West's memory before game 3 of the 2024 NBA Finals between the Celtics and the Dallas Mavericks that night.

== Publications ==
- West, Jerry; Libby, Bill (1969). Mr. Clutch: The Jerry West Story. Prentice-Hall. ISBN 9780136047100.
- West, Jerry; Libby, Bill (1973). Basketball My Way. Prentice-Hall. ISBN 9780130724397.
- West, Jerry; Coleman, Jonathan (2011). West by West: My Charmed, Tormented Life. Little, Brown and Company. ISBN 978-0316194204.

== See also ==
- List of NBA career scoring leaders
- List of NBA career assists leaders
- List of NBA career free throw scoring leaders
- List of NBA career playoff scoring leaders
- List of NBA career playoff assists leaders
- List of NBA annual scoring leaders
- List of NBA single-game scoring leaders
- List of NBA single-game assists leaders
- List of NBA single-game steals leaders
- List of NBA single-game playoff scoring leaders
- List of NCAA Division I men's basketball players with 2,000 points and 1,000 rebounds
- List of NBA players who have spent their entire career with one franchise
