= Jonathan Coleman (author) =

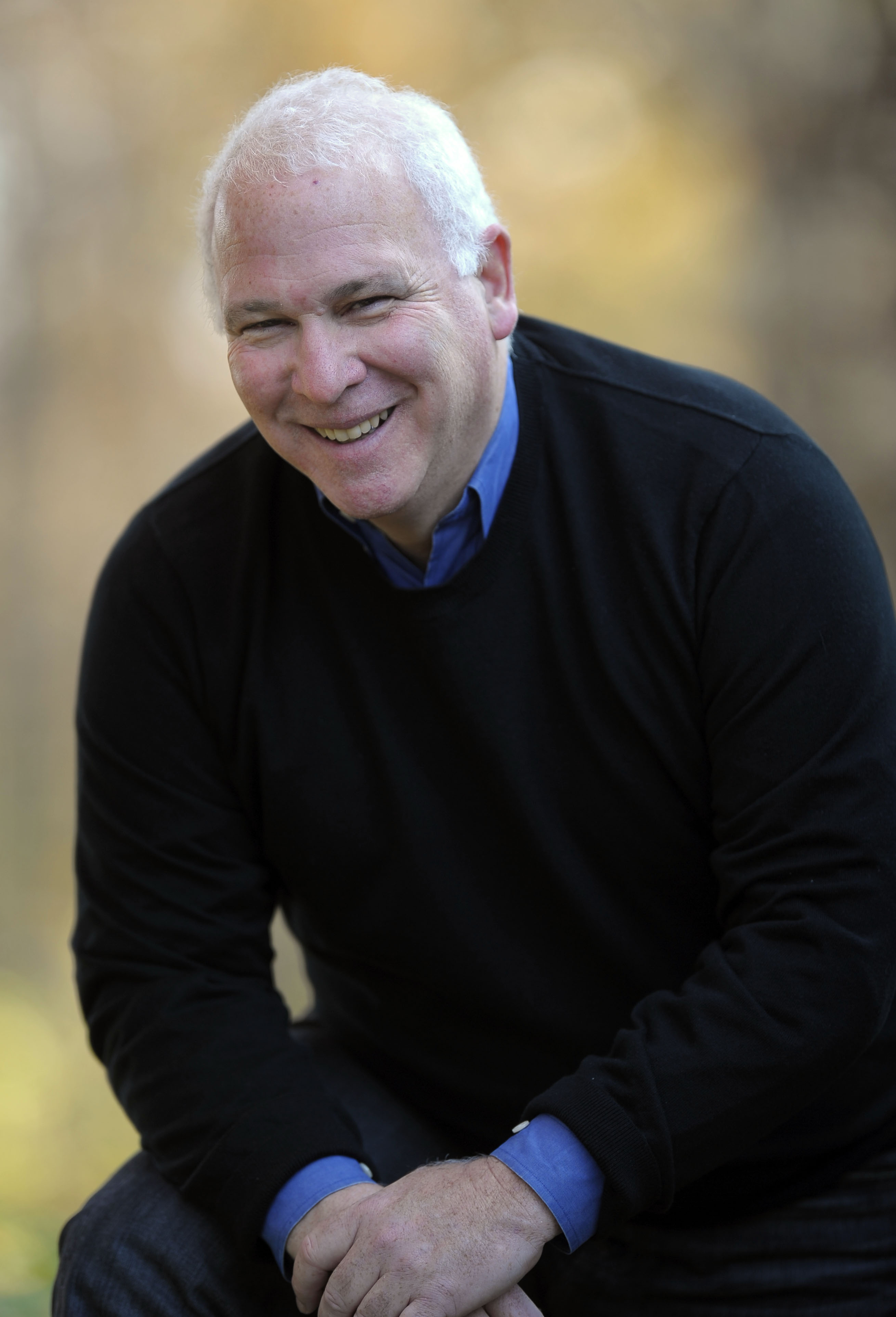
- Portrait
- Born: 1951 (age 74–75); Allentown, United States
- Occupation: Author

Jonathan Coleman (born 1951) is an American author of literary nonfiction living in New York City.

== Background ==
Jonathan Coleman was born in 1951 in Allentown, Pennsylvania.

== Career ==
=== Publishing ===
Jonathan Coleman worked as a book editor with Knopf and Simon & Schuster. In 1980, in a piece about publishing, he was profiled in Time magazine as one of the best editors in the field.

=== Producer ===
In 1981, Coleman was a producer and correspondent with CBS News.

=== Teaching ===
In 1986, Coleman began teaching literary nonfiction writing at the University of Virginia through 1993. He lectures at universities throughout the country.

=== Writing ===
Coleman's books—three of which have been New York Times bestsellers—have included Exit the Rainmaker (1989), the story of Jay Carsey, a college president who abruptly abandoned his marriage and career and disappeared, a book the Los Angeles Times Book Review called "A fascinating, symbolic statement of the American psyche"; At Mother's Request: A True Story of Money, Murder, and Betrayal, about the murder of Franklin Bradshaw (which was hailed as "a masterwork of reporting" by the Washington Post Book World, won an Edgar Allan Poe Award from the Mystery Writers of America and was made into a CBS miniseries); and Long Way to Go: Black and White in America, which Library Journal called "A stunner....Coleman's narrative technique is superb...a brilliant book."

In 2011, Coleman coauthored the autobiography of basketball legend Jerry West—West by West: My Charmed, Tormented Life—which was greeted with critical acclaim (Gay Talese called the book "powerful" and "exceptional" and The New Yorker said it was "deeply thoughtful in a way rare among books by former athletes") and became an instant New York Times bestseller. The Los Angeles Times named it one of the best nonfiction books of 2011. In 2015, he published an e-book, CROSSING THE LINE: How One Incident in a Girls' Soccer Match Rippled Across Small-town America. The author Bob Kolker called Coleman "a nonfiction mastermind."

=== Voice work ===
Coleman currently narrates documentaries and audio books, as well as doing voiceovers for commercials. As "The Voice" of the Culinary Institute of America, he won two Telly Awards and a James Beard Award for Best Video Webcast. He has recently narrated Ken Auletta's Hollywood Ending: Harvey Weinstein and the Culture of Silence, which was released in 2022. His voice, said AudioFile is one "we are likely to hear for years to come."

== Works ==
Books:

- At Mother's Request: A True Story of Money, Murder, and Betrayal (1985)
- Exit the Rainmaker (1989)
- Long Way to Go: Black and White in America (1997)
- West by West: My Charmed, Tormented Life (2011)
- Crossing the Line: How One Incident in a Girls' Soccer Match Rippled Across Small-Town America(2015; updated epilogue published in 2017 with significant new information)

Articles:

- "Taking Pictures In the Belly of the World's Largest Camera," New Yorker (2000)
- "Death at the Garden," New Yorker (2013)
