= Happy Day =

Happy Day may refer to:

- The Happy Day, a 1916 musical comedy
- Happy Day (album), a 2008 album by Tim Hughes
- "The Happy Day" (Ashes to Ashes), an episode of Ashes to Ashes
- Hap Day (1901–1990), Canadian professional hockey player
- "Happy Day", a 1994 song by house musical duo Uncanny Alliance
- "Happy Day", a song by Talking Heads from their 1977 album Talking Heads: 77
- "Happy Day" (song), a 2014 song by Georgian singer Lizi Pop
- Happy Day (film), a 1939 Egyptian film
- The Happy Day (picture book), a 1949 picture book
- "Happy Day," a 1755 hymn by Philip Doddridge

== See also ==
- International Day of Happiness
- Happy Days (disambiguation)
- Oh Happy Day (disambiguation)
