= Jay Carsey =

American academic (1935–2000)

Julian Nance "Jay" Carsey (1935–2000) was an American college administrator and former president of Charles County Community College (now the College of Southern Maryland). He is known for twice vanishing from his established life and reinventing himself elsewhere.

== Biography ==
Carsey was born in Ballinger, Texas and graduated from Stephen F. Austin High School in 1952. He graduated from Texas A&M University in 1958. Upon graduation, he received a commission as a 2nd lieutenant in the United States Army Reserves. He graduated from George Washington University with a doctorate in public administration in 1971. He served with the United States Army. In 1965, he became a president of Charles County Community College (now the College of Southern Maryland) in Maryland.

In May 1982 Carsey left his wife Nancy Stevens Brumfield and his job and left Maryland, heading to Texas. He left a note saying he did not want to drag his wife down with him and she granted him a divorce in 1985. They had no children.

Carsey moved to El Paso, Texas, married Dawn Peacock Garcia, and taught mathematics at US Air Force bases in Europe. In 1988, he did administrative work with El Paso Community College and had an interview with an investigative reporter Jonathan Coleman. However, in December 1992 he vanished again and later divorced Dawn.

According to an interviewed source in Coleman's book Exit the Rainmaker, Carsey, when in his early 20s, fathered a child in Texas who he paid child support for a period of time, but did not acknowledge or contact. Carsey moved to Jacksonville, Florida and taught in some of the local colleges. He later moved in with Corinne Silverton.

Jay Carsey died in Jacksonville in August 2000.

== Books ==
- Jonathan Coleman – Exit the Rainmaker (1989) ISBN 0-689-11877-5
