= Happy Days (book) =

1995 autobiography by Shana Alexander

Happy Days: My Mother, My Father, My Sister & Me
- Author: Shana Alexander
- Genre: Autobiography
- Publisher: Doubleday
- Publication date: 1995

Happy Days: My Mother, My Father, My Sister & Me is an autobiography by American journalist, Shana Alexander, published by Doubleday in 1995.

== Subject of the book ==
While the book addresses her often strained relationship with her parents, Tin Pan Alley composer Milton Ager and columnist Cecelia Ager, Alexander stated in interviews that she aimed to avoid writing a sensationalized, Mommie Dearest-style celebrity confessional. Instead, she intended to "tell this difficult story and to make a memorial to them," describing them as "a remarkable couple, spanning a rich history of show business," and noting that by the end of the process, they had become her "best friends."

“When you write about your parents you have to find a balance and be truthful without sacrificing any dignity,” she said. “I feel I described my parents in a careful refinement of words.”

Although used to writing about difficult subjects and complicated, tough people (her previous books had included Anyone's Daughter, about Patty Hearst; Very Much a Lady about Jean Harris, the headmistress convicted of murdering Scarsdale diet author Dr. Herman Tarnower; and The Pizza Connection about Mafia drug dealing), in interviews, Alexander maintained that the look at herself and her own family, especially the complex, sometimes baffling relationship between her parents and her relationship with them was a daunting task. Alexander researched the book for five years and found difficult the fact that her parents, the primary subjects, refused to reveal key facts. "We were an allegedly open family, but our parents never told us anything," Ms. Alexander said. "I had to do a lot of detective work to uncover the truth about my parents' lives. I knew almost nothing about them as people."

In the book, Alexander reveals a perplexing contrast between her parents public and private lives. On the surface, her parents lead glamorous lives and were the toast of the town. Her father Milton was a noted and highly successful composer whose songs included "Happy Days Are Here Again", "Ain't She Sweet", and "I'm Nobody’s Baby"; her mother Cecelia wrote columns in Variety, was a Hollywood screenwriter, and Manhattan movie critic. Friends like George and Ira Gershwin, the Marx Brothers, Sophie Tucker, and Dorothy Parker were some of the frequent visitors to their homes in New York and Hollywood. Yet, in their private lives, the couple, who often lived in hotels, were temperamentally opposites, slept in separate rooms, and essentially led separate lives. Alexander describes her mother as cold and unattached and writes of her inability to express love to either her daughters or her husband. However, the marriage lasted 57 years.

The book's title, "Happy Days", taken from one of her father's most famous songs, "Happy Days Are Here Again" is ironic “because my childhood was anything but,” Alexander said.

== Critical reception ==
The book was praised for its craftsmanship and its intriguing subject matter, particularly around the unanswered questions concerning Alexander's parents’ lives and as a “moving autobiography of a life damaged by the chilly Cecilia's inability to love her and her sister Laurel, and her beloved father's inability to help.” While noting the glittery atmosphere created by appearances of the many celebrities who were the Ager's friends, Publishers Weekly summed up the book's main achievement: “But ultimately what will stay with readers the most is Alexander's moving account of her parents, her relationships with them, and their relationship with each other.”
