= Shana Alexander =

American journalist (1925–2005)

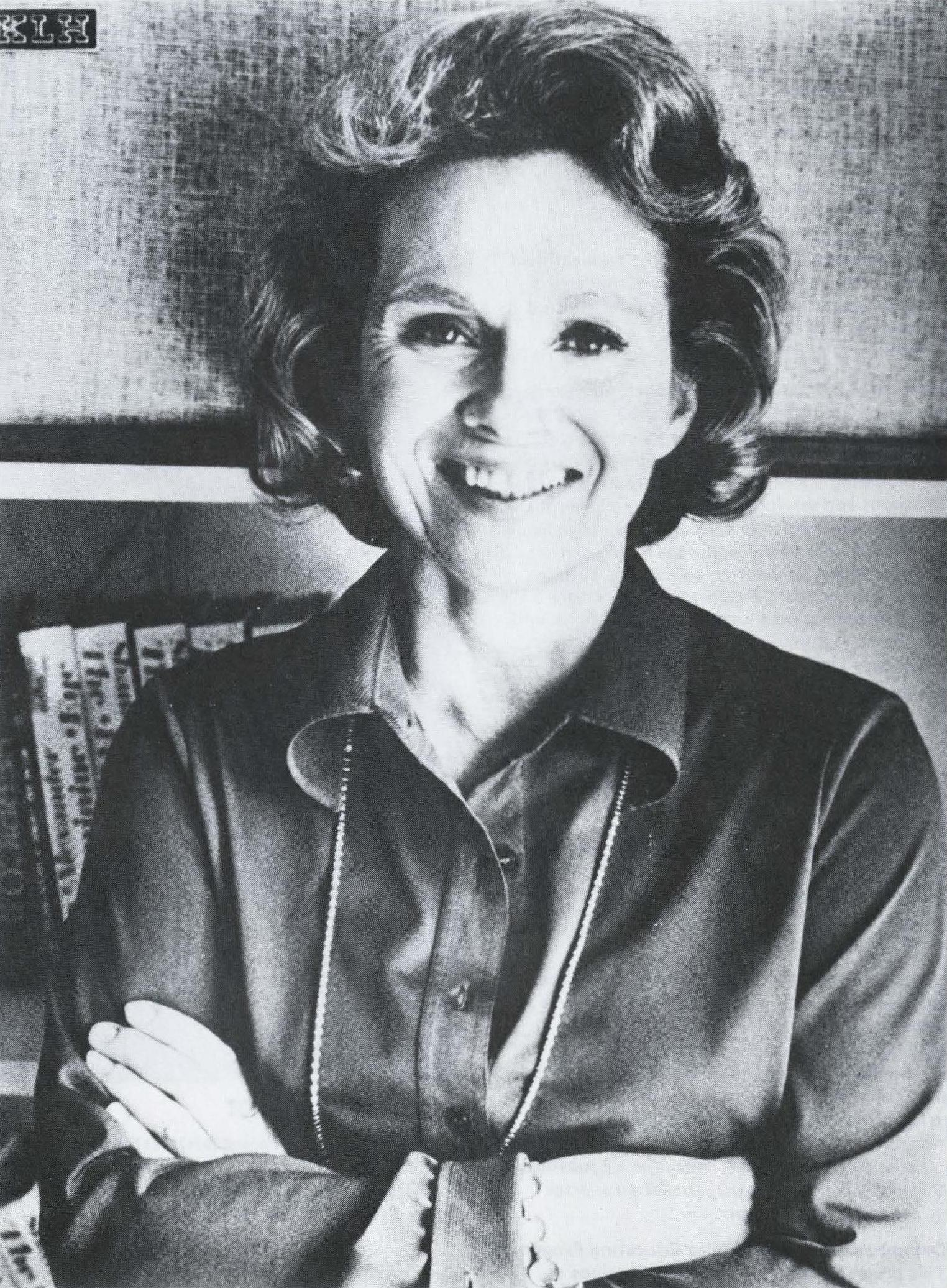
- Alexander c. 1978
- Born: Shana Ager; October 6, 1925; New York City, U.S.
- Died: June 23, 2005 (aged 79); Hermosa Beach, California, U.S.
- Education: Vassar College
- Occupation: Journalist
- Writing career
- Notable works: Anyone's Daughter (1979); Happy Days: My Mother, My Father, My Sister & Me (1995); Very Much a Lady: The Untold Story of Jean Harris and Dr. Herman Tarnower (1983)

Shana Alexander (October 6, 1925 – June 23, 2005) was an American journalist. Although she became the first woman staff writer and columnist for Life magazine, she was best known for her participation in the "Point-Counterpoint" debate segments of 60 Minutes in the late 1970s with conservative James J. Kilpatrick.

== Early life and journalism career ==
Alexander was born Shana Ager on October 6, 1925, in New York City, the daughter of columnist Cecelia Ager (née Rubenstein) and Tin Pan Alley composer Milton Ager, who composed the song "Happy Days Are Here Again". She inspired his famous song "Ain't She Sweet." Her family was Jewish. Alexander graduated from Vassar College in 1945, majoring in anthropology. She fell into writing when she took a summer job as a copy clerk at the New York City newspaper PM, where her mother worked. She worked as a freelance writer for Junior Bazaar and Mademoiselle magazines before becoming a researcher at Life magazine for $65 a week in 1951. During the 1960s she wrote "The Feminine Eye" column for Life.

In 1962 she wrote an article for Life entitled "They Decide Who Lives, Who Dies: Medical miracle puts moral burden on small committee," which sparked a national debate on the allocation of scarce kidney dialysis machine resources. Another Life article, about a suicide-hotline worker's efforts to keep a caller from killing herself, was turned into the 1965 film, The Slender Thread.

== 60 Minutes and later career ==
In 1969 she became the first female editor at McCall's since 1921, but quit in 1971, complaining that it was a token job in a sexist environment. She was writing a column for Newsweek in 1975 when she replaced Nicholas von Hoffman on 60 Minutes, and debated Kilpatrick for the next four years. She played down this part of her career, commenting in 1979 that prior to that she "had been a writer, a columnist for Life magazine and for Newsweek -- that was about as high as you could get in column writing. I care about my writing. I'm not a quack-quack TV journalist."

Still, the debates Alexander had with Kilpatrick were so prominent in American culture that they were famously satirized on Saturday Night Live, with Jane Curtin taking Alexander's role on the “Weekend Update" segment opposite Dan Aykroyd's version of Kilpatrick, arguing two sides of a topic in the news. Aykroyd opened his segment with the now-infamous line, "Jane, you ignorant slut."

She also wrote a number of non-fiction books, including Anyone's Daughter, a biography of kidnapped heiress Patricia Hearst. Her book Nutcracker, about Frances Schreuder, the convicted socialite who persuaded her son to kill her millionaire father, was made into a 1987 TV miniseries. Schreuder was played by actress Lee Remick.

== Personal life ==
Alexander married and divorced twice. Her first marriage, at age 19, ended quickly. Her second, to Stephen Alexander, lasted 12 years and Shana described it as "unhappy." They had one daughter, Katherine, chose to live with Stephen and his new wife following the divorce. Katherine later lived with her mother in a Park Avenue high-rise in New York. In February 1987, Katherine jumped 31 stories to her death.

== Death ==
Shana Alexander died of cancer in an assisted living facility in Hermosa Beach, California, on June 23, 2005. She was 79 and had lived in Manhattan and Wainscott, New York, for many years. Alexander was survived by a sister, Laurel Bentley, and a niece.

== Books ==
- Talking Woman (1976)
- Anyone's Daughter (1979)
- Happy Days: My Mother, My Father, My Sister & Me (1995), autobiography
- Very Much a Lady: The Untold Story of Jean Harris and Dr. Herman Tarnower, Edgar Award, Best Fact Crime book, (1983)
- When She Was Bad (1991)
- Nutcracker (1985)
- The Astonishing Elephant (2000)
- The Pizza Connection: Lawyers, Money, Drugs, Mafia (1988)
