= Murder of Franklin Bradshaw =

1978 murder of an Utahn industrialist by his grandson

Franklin Bradshaw was a Utah industrialist who was murdered on July 23, 1978, by his grandson, Marc Schreuder, at the instigation of his daughter, Frances Berenice Schreuder.

The case inspired widespread coverage, including two books and two television movies. Prosecutors alleged that Frances Schreuder did not want to be cut out of her father's will and wished to continue funding her lavish lifestyle.

== The killing ==
Heiress Frances Berenice Schreuder (born on April 6, 1938, in Salt Lake City, and died on March 30, 2004) pressured her 17 year old son Marc Schreuder to murder her father, oil and auto parts millionaire Franklin Bradshaw. The murder was committed on July 23, 1978, when Marc Schreuder shot his grandfather in the back of the head.

Once Marc Schreuder's link to the crime was discovered, it was alleged that Frances Schreuder manipulated him through an unhealthy and abusive form of "triangulation","using him to target and murder her father. One of the wrinkles of the case was that Frances Schreuder's mother, Berenice Bradshaw, continued to support her daughter throughout the case and bequeathed to Frances a share of her estate.

Marc Schreuder was convicted of second-degree murder in 1982 and spent 12 years in the Utah State Prison. Frances Schreuder was convicted of first-degree murder in 1983 and spent 13 years in prison.

== Books ==
The case has inspired at least two nonfiction books: At Mother's Request: A True Story of Money, Murder and Betrayal by Jonathan Coleman and Nutcracker: Money, Madness, Murder: A Family Album by Shana Alexander.

Schreuder's psychiatrist Herman Weiner filed a libel suit against Alexander and her publisher based on his being mentioned in two paragraphs. The case went to the New York Court of Appeals, which ruled in favor of the author and publisher, noting that the allegedly defamatory content was "pure opinion" and thus protected under the law, and also set legal precedent.

== Television ==
Alexander's book was the basis for the 1987 miniseries Nutcracker: Money, Madness and Murder, starring Lee Remick as Frances Schreuder and Tate Donovan as Marc Schreuder.

Coleman's book was the basis for the 1987 television movie At Mother's Request, starring Stefanie Powers as Frances Schreuder and Doug McKeon as Marc Schreuder.

On February 25, 2004, the case was discussed by Dominick Dunne in the episode "Family Secrets" (season 4, episode 5) of the true-crime series Dominick Dunne's Power, Privilege, and Justice.

On March 18, 2005, the case was featured on My Dirty Little Secret on the Investigation Discovery Channel.

The case was featured on the documentary television series Behind Mansion Walls (season 3, episode 4, titled "Flesh And Blood")

The April 7, 2018 episode "Mother's Little Helper" (Season 5, episode 8), of the Investigation Discovery series A Crime to Remember focused on the case.
