= Bob Markell =

American television producer (1924–2020)

- Born: Robert Joseph Markell; April 12, 1924; Boston, Massachusetts, U.S.
- Died: January 25, 2020 (aged 95); Shelter Island, New York, U.S.
- Other names: Bob Markel; Robert Markel; Robert Markell
- Occupations: Art director, television producer
- Years active: 1950—1992

Robert Joseph Markell (April 12, 1924 - January 25, 2020) was an artist, engineer, and award-winning television producer and art director of television series, movies and mini-series.

== Early life and education ==
Robert Markell was born in Boston, Massachusetts on April 12, 1924. He earned a Bachelor of Engineering degree in 1944 and an honorary Doctorate of Fine Arts in 1965 from Northeastern University. After college, Markell worked for the Grumman Aircraft Company in 1944-1946 as a civil engineer and architect in Boston until 1948. In 1948, he became a student at the Art Students League in New York City.

== Film career ==
Markell began his film career as a scenic designer at CBS-TV, where he worked from 1949 to 1959. During that time, he also had the opportunities to take on art director roles, one of which landed him an Emmy. From 1959 to 1960, he was the associate producer for Playhouse 90. He moved on to produce the classic TV courtroom drama The Defenders during the years 1961–65, winning two Emmy awards. Between 1967 and 1969, he produced the popular television show NYPD, starring Jack Warden, Robert Hooks and Frank Converse. NYPD featured one of the earliest performances by Al Pacino, who guest starred as a bigoted southerner. In 1973, he became the executive producer of dramatic programs for CBS-TV. Markell received Emmy awards in 1954, 1962, 1963, 1964, and 1976, and the Screen Producers Guild Award in 1962 and 1963.

"We were free to do anything we wanted, to say anything we wanted. And we weren't afraid of being fired or anything like that. We kind of knew our limits so we weren't that extravagant. The Golden Age of Television was an age where everybody was learning. There were no experts, so there was nobody to tell us what to do." -Bob Markell

=== Executive producer roles ===
- Nicky's World (1974)
- Dain Curse (1978)
- Bicentennial Minutes (1974-1976)
- Word (1979)
- You Can't Go Home Again (1979)
- If Tomorrow Comes (1986)
- At Mother's Request (1987)

=== Producer roles ===
- Playhouse 90 (1959-1960)
- NYPD (1967-1969)
- Dr. Cook's Garden (1971)
- Tattered Web (1972)
- Murder Once Removed (1972)
- Settle the Score (1990)

=== Art director roles ===
- You Are There (1954)
- 12 Angry Men (1957)

== Later life ==
After retiring from his film career, Markell spent his time painting and printmaking. He experimented in etching, monoprints, oil and acrylic paintings, and was known for his studies of the nude figure on the East End of the Island. His work has been on display in numerous exhibits, galleries, and the Brooklyn Museum.
