= Cecelia Ager =

American film critic and reporter

- Born: Cecelia Rubinstein; January 23, 1902; Grass Valley, California, U.S.
- Died: April 3, 1981 (aged 79); Los Angeles, California
- Occupation: Film critic
- Spouse(s): Milton Ager (1922–1979)
- Children: Shana Alexander, Laurel Bentley

Cecelia Ager (née Rubinstein; January 23, 1902 – April 3, 1981) was an American film critic and star reporter for Variety and The New York Times Magazine.

== Life and career ==
Ager was born Cecelia Rubenstein in Grass Valley, California, a mining town, the daughter of Fannie (Meyer) and Zalkin H. Rubenstein. Her parents were Polish Jewish immigrants. She married Milton Ager four months after meeting him; Mayor Jimmy Walker of New York, also a songwriter, presided at the wedding in his office.

Ager was the first female reporter for Variety, and was known as one of the best dressed women in America. Ager was the movie critic for the New York newspaper PM and a contributor to The New York Times and several national magazines. Her sense of style became an asset to advance her work as a writer. It has been said that "she used fashion as her entry into examining the constricting roles women were asked to play, in real life and onscreen.”

Amongst the earliest critics to take notice of the importance of Orson Welles's 1941 film Citizen Kane, she wrote for PM: “Before Citizen Kane, it's as if the motion picture were a slumbering monster, a mighty force stupidly sleeping, lying there…awaiting a fierce young man to come kick it to life, to rouse it, shake it, awaken it to its potentialities.... Seeing it, it's as if you never really saw a movie before.”

Cecelia's aunt was Anzia Yezierska, known for her sensitive writing about the immigrant Jewish experience in New York. Anzia's uncle, Meyer Yeziersky/Max Mayer was the first of his family to immigrate to the US. Anzia arrived in 1901 after the rest of the family had joined him in adopting his first name as their surname in the US. Her success with novels and a film encouraged her niece and grandniece.

Ager died in Los Angeles in 1981 after suffering a stroke.
