= At Mother's Request =

- Genre: Drama
- Based on: At Mother's Request: A True Story of Money, Murder and Betrayal by Jonathan Coleman
- Teleplay by: Richard DeLong Adams
- Directed by: Michael Tuchner
- Starring: E.G. Marshall; Stefanie Powers; Doug McKeon
- Theme music composer: Charles Gross
- Country of origin: United States
- Original language: English

Production
- Producers: Bob Markell; Christopher Morgan
- Cinematography: Larry Pizer
- Editor: Gary Griffin
- Running time: 240 minutes
- Production companies: Incorporated Television Company; Vista Organization

Original release
- Network: CBS
- Release: January 4 – January 6, 1987

At Mother's Request is a 1987 two-part television miniseries based on a true story (the Franklin Bradshaw murder). The movie stars E.G. Marshall and Stefanie Powers.

== Plot summary ==
Frances Schreuder is a mother who is mean to her sons and sometimes her only daughter, especially when she imagines that they're not living up to what she expects them to be as her children. Greedy and selfish, she decides she wants her inheritance from her rich, multimillionaire-although miserly-father, auto parts and oil industrialist Franklin Bradshaw.

Frances has done many bad things to get what she wants. For example, she has forged some of her father's checks to get things she wants and had her sons steal money from him when they were visiting him the summer before his death. She eventually decides she wants her money right away, especially when she finds he drew up a new, although unofficial, will that specifically left her out of it. Frances manipulates her son Marc into murdering her father by threatening suicide and locking him out if he didn't commit the murder, as she had already ejected her older son (firstborn of her three children), Larry, because he was "sick in the head," and threatened to commit her daughter to a psychiatric facility just for not being able to say the definition of a sentence.

== Cast ==
- E.G. Marshall as Franklin Bradshaw
- Stefanie Powers as Frances Schreuder
- Doug McKeon as Marc Schreuder
- Jenna von Oÿ as Ashley Schreuder
- Corey Parker as Larry Schreuder
- Frances Lee McCain as Lois Turner
- Terry O'Quinn as Jeol Campbell
- Ray Baker as Michael George
- Frances Sternhagen as Berenice Bradshaw
- Martin Donovan as Detective Rogen
- George Sullivan as Detective Voyles
- Roberts Blossom as Doug Steele
- Chris Noth as Steve Klein
- Dan Lauria as Myles Manning
- Louis Borgenicht as Stanley Turner
- Nancy Borgenicht as Nancy Jones
- Jasmine Guy as Bank Teller

== Production ==
Parts of the miniseries were shot in Salt Lake City, Utah.
