= Happy Days (disambiguation) =

Happy Days is an American television sitcom set during the 1950s and 1960s.

Happy Days may also refer to:

== Film ==
- Happy Days (1929 film), musical film, the first film to be shown entirely in widescreen
- Happy Days (1936 film), last of the Comicolor cartoons (Ub Iwerks Studio)
- Happy Days (1978 film), Turkish film
- Happy Days (1991 film), Soviet film
- Happy Days (2007 film), Telugu film by Shekar Kammula
- Happy Days (2018 film), Nepalese film

== Music ==
- Happy Days (TV theme), theme song of the hit 1970s sitcom
- "Happy Days" (North End song), 1981
- Happy Days (album), 1995 music album by Catherine Wheel
- "Happy Days" (Ai Otsuka song), 2004
- Happy Days, song on the 2014 album Pink Lemonade by Closure in Moscow
- "Happy Days" (Brooke Candy song), 2016
- “Happy Days” (Blink-182 song), 2019
- Happy Days, song on the 2017 album Album by Ghali

== Publications ==
- Happy Days, 1933-42 newsletter of the Civilian Conservation Corps published by Happy Days Publication Company
- Happy Days, 1880–1892, 1940 first book in an autobiographical trilogy by HL Mencken
- Happy Days (book), 1995 autobiography by Shana Alexander

== Other uses ==
- Happy Days, a respite home for children run by the Melbourne City Mission, Australia, in the 1930s
- Happy Days (musical), 2009 musical based on the sitcom
- Happy Days (play), 1961 play by Samuel Beckett
- Happy Days (tobacco), a former brand of dipping tobacco from the United States Tobacco Company

== See also ==
- "Happy Days Are Here Again", 1929 song
- Happy Days Are Here Again (film), 1936 film
- Happy Day (disambiguation)
