= List of Northern Illinois Huskies men's basketball head coaches =

The following is a list of Northern Illinois Huskies men's basketball head coaches. There have been 29 head coaches of the Huskies in their 123-season history.

Northern Illinois' current head coach is Rashon Burno. He was hired as the Huskies' head coach in March 2021, replacing Mark Montgomery, who was fired in January 2021.

| No. | Tenure | Coach | Years | Record | Pct. |
|---|---|---|---|---|---|
| 1 | 1900–1902; 1904–1905 | John A. H. Keith | 3 | 13–7 | .650 |
| 2 | 1902–1903 | Fred Charles | 1 | 2–1 | .667 |
| 3 | 1903–1904 | William Crocker | 1 | 3–7 | .300 |
| 4 | 1905–1906 | Harry Sauthoff | 1 | 7–2 | .778 |
| 5 | 1906–1910 | Nelson A. Kellogg | 4 | 17–27 | .386 |
| 6 | 1910–1918 | William Wirtz | 8 | 57–31 | .648 |
| 7 | 1918–1920 | Ralph Wagner | 2 | 13–10 | .565 |
| 8 | 1920–1923 | Milo Oakland | 3 | 25–18 | .581 |
| 9 | 1923–1926 | William Muir | 3 | 34–11 | .756 |
| 10 | 1926–1929 | Roland Cowell | 3 | 40–14 | .741 |
| 11 | 1929–1940 | Chick Evans | 11 | 125–93 | .573 |
| 12 | 1940–1948 | Ralph McKinzie | 8 | 94–56 | .627 |
| 13 | 1948–1949 | Gene Fekete | 1 | 10–11 | .476 |
| 14 | 1949–1950 | Gilbert Wilson | 1 | 4–17 | .190 |
| 15 | 1950–1954 | Gilman Hertz | 4 | 35–44 | .443 |
| 16 | 1954–1963 | William Healey | 9 | 96–94 | .505 |
| 17 | 1963–1966 | Ev Cochrane | 3 | 33–34 | .493 |
| 18 | 1966–1973 | Tom Jorgensen | 7 | 95–71 | .572 |
| 19 | 1973–1976 | Emory Luck | 3 | 21–53 | .284 |
| 20 | 1976–1986 | John McDougal | 10 | 136–141 | .491 |
| 21 | 1986–1989 | Jim Rosborough | 3 | 28–56 | .333 |
| 22 | 1989–1991 | Jim Molinari | 2 | 42–17 | .712 |
| 23 | 1991–2000 (Note: Hammel resigned in December 2000. Andy Greer served as interim head coach for the remainder of the 2000–01 season.) | Brian Hammel | 10 | 117–138 | .459 |
| 24 | 2000–2001* | Andy Greer | 1 | 4–17 | .190 |
| 25 | 2001–2007 | Rob Judson | 6 | 74–101 | .423 |
| 26 | 2007–2011 | Ricardo Patton | 4 | 35–83 | .297 |
| 27 | 2011–2021 (Note: Montgomery was fired in January 2021. Lamar Chapman served as interim head coach for the remainder of the 2020–21 season.) | Mark Montgomery | 10 | 124–170 | .422 |
| 28 | 2021* | Lamar Chapman | 1 | 2–9 | .182 |
| 29 | 2021–present | Rashon Burno | 2 | 22–40 | .355 |
| Totals | | 29 coaches | 123 seasons | 1,308–1,373 | .488 |
Records updated through end of 2022–23 season * - Denotes interim head coach. Source
