= 1955–56 Illinois Fighting Illini men's basketball team =

American college basketball season

1955–56 Illinois Fighting Illini men's basketball
- Conference: Big Ten Conference

Ranking
- Coaches: No. 8
- AP: No. 10
- Record: 18–4 (11-3 Big Ten)
- Head coach: Harry Combes (9th season)
- Assistant coach: Howie Braun (19th season)
- MVP: Bruce Brothers
- Captain: Paul Judson
- Home arena: Huff Hall

1955–56 Big Ten Conference men's basketball standings
	Conf.				Overall
Team	W		L	PCT	W		L	PCT
No. 4 Iowa	13	–	1	.929	20	–	6	.769
No. 10 Illinois	11	–	3	.786	18	–	4	.818
Ohio State	9	–	5	.643	16	–	6	.727
Purdue	9	–	5	.643	16	–	6	.727
Michigan State	7	–	7	.500	13	–	9	.591
Indiana	6	–	8	.429	13	–	9	.591
Minnesota	6	–	8	.429	11	–	11	.500
Michigan	4	–	10	.286	9	–	13	.409
Wisconsin	4	–	10	.286	6	–	16	.273
Northwestern	1	–	13	.071	2	–	20	.091
Rankings from AP Poll

The 1955–56 Illinois Fighting Illini men’s basketball team represented the University of Illinois.

== Regular season ==
Harry Combes, for the ninth consecutive year at Illinois, directed a team that would finish no worse than third place in the Big Ten. His 164 wins and 44 losses overall with a 94 and 30 record in the conference gave Combes three "Final Four" finishes as well as three conference championships. Combes' team, recruited by assistant coach Howie Braun, was exclusively recruited from the state of Illinois.

The 1955-56 team had talented lettermen return including the leading scorers George Bon Salle and team "captain" Paul Judson. It also saw the return of Bruce Brothers, Bill Ridley, Bill Altenberger, Hiles Stout, and future Illini head coach, Harv Schmidt. The team also added future NBA all-star Don Ohl as a sophomore. The Illini finished the season with a conference record of 11 wins and 3 losses, finishing in 2nd place in the Big Ten. Unfortunately the Illini would lose four total games with two of the four coming in the final three days of the season. The Illini's final Associated Press ranking placed them at "#7", however; they maintained a "#2" national ranking for the final month of the regular season. The starting lineup included George Bon Salle at the center position, Bill Ridley and Paul Judson at guard and Harv Schmidt, Bruce Brothers and Don Ohl at the forward slots.

=== Roster ===
1955–56 Illinois Fighting Illini men's basketball team
Players
Coaches

Pos.	#	Name	Height	Weight	Year	Previous school	Hometown
F	8	Jim Chengary	6 ft 3 in (1.91 m)	190 lb (86 kg)	So	Bowen High School	Chicago, Illinois
F	10	Hiles Stout	6 ft 4 in (1.93 m)	205 lb (93 kg)	Jr	Central High School	Peoria, Illinois
G	11	Bill Ridley	5 ft 9 in (1.75 m)	160 lb (73 kg)	Sr	Taylorville High School	Taylorville, Illinois
G	20	Bill Altenberger	6 ft 1 in (1.85 m)	179 lb (81 kg)	Jr	Senior High School	East St. Louis, Illinois
C	22	George Bon Salle	6 ft 7 in (2.01 m)	215 lb (98 kg)	Jr	Loyola Academy	Chicago, Illinois
C	24	Ted Caiazza	6 ft 7 in (2.01 m)	235 lb (107 kg)	So	Lyons Township High School	LaGrange, Illinois
G	30	Phil Judson	6 ft 2 in (1.88 m)	165 lb (75 kg)	Sr	Alden-Hebron High School	Hebron, Illinois
F	32	Bruce Brothers	6 ft 5 in (1.96 m)	200 lb (91 kg)	Sr	Quincy Senior High School	Quincy, Illinois
F	33	Harvard Schmidt	6 ft 6 in (1.98 m)	190 lb (86 kg)	Jr	Kankakee High School	Kankakee, Illinois
G	34	Paul Judson (C)	6 ft 4 in (1.93 m)	172 lb (78 kg)	Sr	Alden-Hebron High School	Hebron, Illinois
F	35	Larry Breyfogle	6 ft 3 in (1.91 m)	165 lb (75 kg)	So	Lawrenceville High School	Lawrenceville, Illinois
G	43	John Paul	6 ft 1 in (1.85 m)	175 lb (79 kg)	So	St. Edward High School	Elgin, Illinois
G	44	Don Ohl	6 ft 3 in (1.91 m)	190 lb (86 kg)	So	Edwardsville High School	Edwardsville, Illinois

Head coach

- Harry Combes (University of Illinois) (9th year)

Assistant coach(es)

- Howie Braun (University of Illinois) (19th year)

Legend

- (C) Team captain
- (S) Suspended
- (I) Ineligible
- (W) Walk-on
- Injured
- Current redshirt

Roster

== Schedule ==
Date time, TV	Rank^{#}	Opponent^{#}	Result	Record	Site (attendance) city, state
Non-Conference regular season
12/6/1955*	No. 8	Butler	W 107–75	1-0	Huff Hall (4,535); Champaign, IL
12/10/1955*	No. 8	at Missouri; Rivalry	L 73–74	1-1	Brewer Fieldhouse (5,800); Columbia, MO
12/13/1955*		at Notre Dame	W 103–93	2-1	Notre Dame Fieldhouse (4,300); Notre Dame, IN
12/17/1955*		Washington (St. Louis)	W 75–74	3-1	Huff Hall (4,444); Champaign, IL
12/19/1955*		DePaul	W 97–79	4-1	Huff Hall (4,747); Champaign, IL
12/23/1955*	No. 17	Oklahoma	W 82–58	5-1	Huff Hall (3,390); Champaign, IL
12/29/1955*	No. 9	Drake	W 102–66	6-1	Huff Hall (3,713); Champaign, IL
Big Ten regular season
1/2/1956	No. 9	No. 16 Michigan State	W 73–65	7-1 (1-0)	Huff Hall (5,192); Champaign, IL
1/9/1956	No. 6	Wisconsin	W 96–77	8-1 (2-0)	Huff Hall (6,069); Champaign, IL
1/14/1956	No. 8	at No. 12 Indiana; Rivalry	W 96–72	9-1 (3-0)	The Fieldhouse (10,056); Bloomington, IN
1/16/1956	No. 8	at Purdue	W 92–76	10-1 (4-0)	Lambert Fieldhouse (9,500); West Lafayette, IN
1/28/1956*	No. 5	at DePaul	W 80–66	11-1	Chicago Stadium (15,254); Chicago, IL
1/30/1956	No. 5	at Minnesota	W 95–84	12-1 (5-0)	Williams Arena (9,805); Minneapolis, MN
2/6/1956	No. 6	Indiana; Rivalry	W 92–89	13-1 (6-0)	Huff Hall (6,912); Champaign, IL
2/11/1956	No. 6	Ohio State	W 111–64	14-1 (7-0)	Huff Hall (6,154); Champaign, IL
2/13/1956	No. 6	Michigan	W 89–66	15-1 (8-0))	Huff Hall (6,135); Champaign, IL
2/18/1956	No. 3	at Michigan State	W 96–76	16-1 (9-0)	Jenison Fieldhouse (9,094); East Lansing, MI
2/20/1956	No. 3	Purdue	W 102–77	17-1 (10-0)	Huff Hall (6,135); Champaign, IL
2/25/1956	No. 2	at Ohio State	L 84–87	17-2 (10-1)	Ohio Expo Center Coliseum (8,539); Columbus, OH
2/27/1956	No. 2	Minnesota	W 97–81	18-2 (11-1)	Huff Hall (5,765); Champaign, IL
3/3/1956	No. 2	at No. 10 Iowa; Rivalry	L 72–96	18-3 (11-2)	Iowa Field House (15,200); Iowa City, IA
3/5/1956	No. 2	at Northwestern; Rivalry	L 82–83	18-4 (11-3)	McGaw Memorial Hall (8,500); Evanston, IL
*Non-conference game. ^{#}Rankings from AP Poll. (#) Tournament seedings in parentheses. All times are in Central Time.

== Player stats ==
Player	Games played	Field goals	Free throws	Points
George BonSalle	22	156	118	430
Paul Judson	22	160	84	404
Bill Ridley	21	109	104	322
Harv Schmidt	22	113	69	295
Bruce Brothers	22	51	58	160
Don Ohl	22	57	33	147
Hiles Stout	22	35	42	112
Bill Altenberger	18	19	15	53
Ted Caiazza	5	8	4	20
Phil Judson	6	7	4	18
Jim Chengary	9	7	0	14
Larry Breyfogle	9	5	1	11
John Paul	12	5	0	10

== Awards and honors ==
- Paul Judson
  - Converse 2nd Team All-American
  - National Association of Basketball Coaches 3rd Team All-American
  - United Press International 3rd Team All-American
  - Newspaper Enterprises Association 3rd Team All-American
  - International News Service Honorable Mention All-American
- Bill Ridley
  - Converse 2nd Team All-American
  - National Association of Basketball Coaches 3rd Team All-American
  - United Press International 3rd Team All-American
  - Newspaper Enterprises Association 3rd Team All-American
- Bruce Brothers
  - Converse Honorable Mention All-American
  - Team Most Valuable Player
- Harv Schmidt
  - Converse Honorable Mention All-American

== Team players drafted into the NBA ==
Player	NBA club	Round	Pick
Paul Judson	Syracuse Nationals	2	13
