= Dick Jorgensen =

American football official (1934–1990)

- Born: Richard M. Jorgensen; April 12, 1934; Neenah, Wisconsin, U.S.
- Died: October 10, 1990 (aged 56); Urbana, Illinois, U.S.
- Resting place: Bailey Memorial Cemetery, Tolono, Illinois
- Education: University of Wisconsin, 1956; Neenah High School, 1952
- Occupations: Bank president, NFL referee
- Known for: NFL referee, civic leader
- Board member of: United Way, chamber of commerce, country club
- Spouse: Adlon Dohme Jorgensen (m.1959–1990, his death)
- Children: 3 daughters
- Military career
- Allegiance: United States
- Branch: U.S. Navy
- Service years: 1956–1958
- Conflicts: Cold War

Richard M. Jorgensen (April 12, 1934 – October 10, 1990) was an American football official in the National Football League (NFL) for 22 years, through the 1989 season, the last 19 years as a referee.

Jorgensen's officiating career was highlighted by being selected to referee Super Bowl XXIV in January 1990. He was an alternate official for Super Bowl VIII in 1974 and Super Bowl XV in 1981.

== Early life ==
Born and raised in Neenah, Wisconsin, southwest of Green Bay, Jorgensen was a three-sport athlete at Neenah High School, where he starred in football and tennis. His primary sport was basketball, played under longtime head coach Ole Jorgensen (1904–1988), his father. His mother Edith also worked at the school, as a physical education teacher. In Jorgensen's senior year in 1952, Neenah advanced to the state semifinals in basketball. and he was selected for the all-state team.

A 6-foot (1.83 m) shooting guard, Jorgensen played college basketball in the Big Ten Conference at the University of Wisconsin in Madison under hall of fame head coach Bud Foster. He was captain of the Badgers his senior year in 1956, graduated and served two years in the U.S. Navy, and married Adlon Dohme in 1959.

== NFL official ==
After five seasons officiating high school and small college football, Jorgensen began his NFL career in 1968 as a line judge. He was promoted to referee three years later in 1971 when his crew chief from 1970, George Rennix, retired.

In the NFL, Jorgensen was assigned to 12 post-season games, including four conference championship games and Super Bowl XXIV (he was the alternate referee for Super Bowl XV). On the field, Jorgensen wore uniform number 60 for the majority of his career (he wore number 6 from 1979–81, when officials were numbered separately by position).

Known for his poise as a referee in the 1970s and 1980s, one incident summarized his presence and is often replayed in highlights. While approaching a fourth quarter scuffle during a Monday night game in November 1983, Jorgensen was inadvertently struck in the mouth by an elbow from Detroit Lions guard Larry Lee, who swung at New York Giants linebacker Lawrence Taylor. The blow caused a cut which required a stitch, but Jorgensen proceeded with the game after calling a penalty and ejecting Lee.

== Bank president ==
Off the field, Jorgensen served as President of Marine Bank of Champaign-Urbana, Illinois. Active in the community as a civic leader, he was also president of the local chapter of the United Way, the chamber of commerce, and his country club.

== Death ==
Super Bowl XXIV in January 1990 was Jorgensen's final game as a game official; that May, he was diagnosed with a rare blood disorder. He died five months later at age 56 on October 10 in Urbana, Illinois. For the remainder of the 1990 season, NFL officials wore a black armband on their left sleeve with the white number 60 to honor Jorgensen.

He and his wife Adlon had three daughters. Jorgensen was buried at Bailey Memorial Cemetery in Tolono.
