= 1955–56 Iowa Hawkeyes men's basketball team =

American college basketball season

1955–56 Iowa Hawkeyes men's basketball
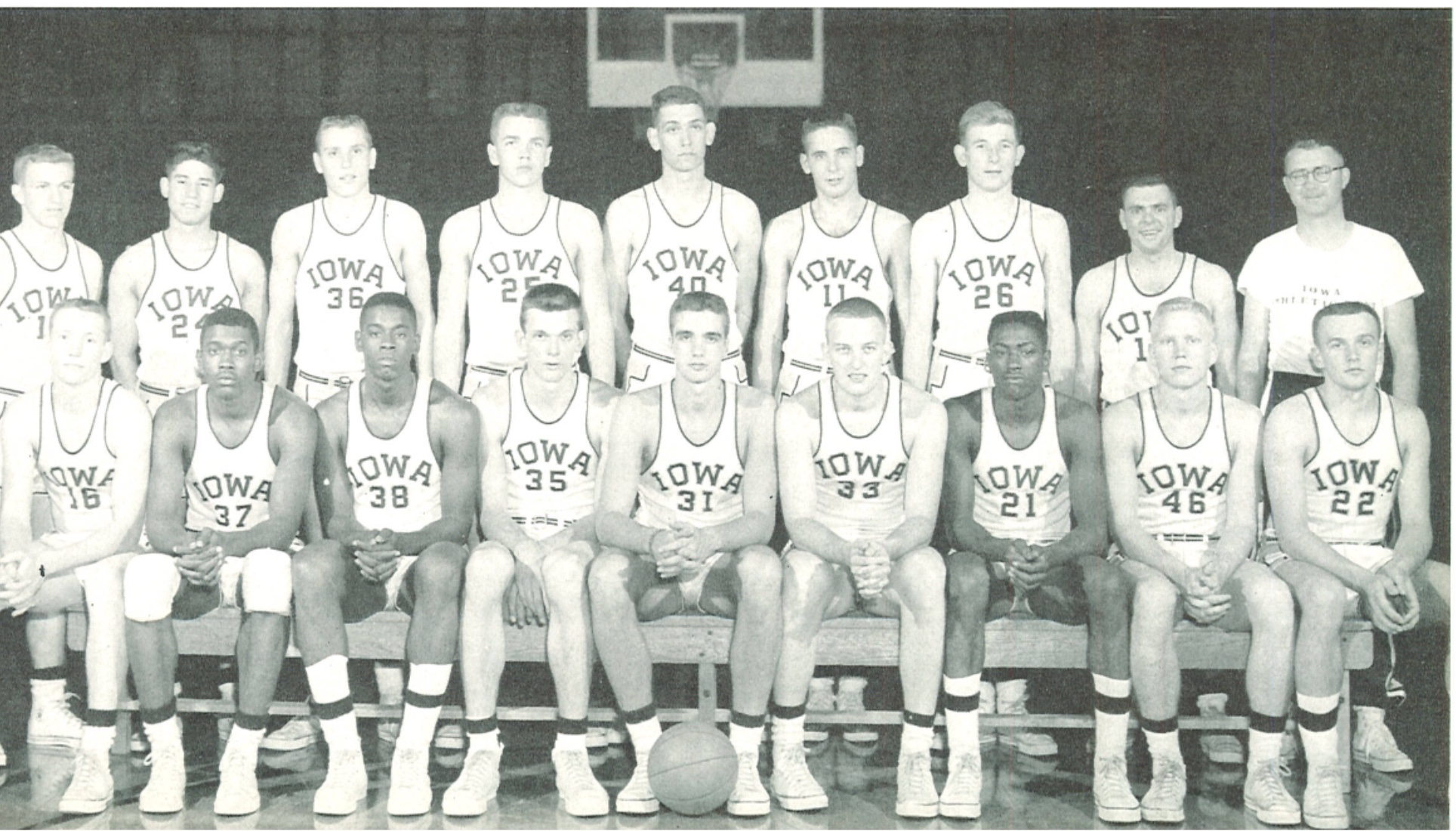

NCAA tournament, Runner-up Big Ten Champions

National Championship Game, L 71-83 vs. San Francisco
- Conference: Big Ten Conference

Ranking
- Coaches: No. 4
- AP: No. 4
- Record: 20–6 (13–1 Big Ten)
- Head coach: Bucky O'Connor
- MVP: Carl Cain
- Home arena: Iowa Field House

1955–56 Big Ten Conference men's basketball standings
	Conf.				Overall
Team	W		L	PCT	W		L	PCT
No. 4 Iowa	13	–	1	.929	20	–	6	.769
No. 10 Illinois	11	–	3	.786	18	–	4	.818
Ohio State	9	–	5	.643	16	–	6	.727
Purdue	9	–	5	.643	16	–	6	.727
Michigan State	7	–	7	.500	13	–	9	.591
Indiana	6	–	8	.429	13	–	9	.591
Minnesota	6	–	8	.429	11	–	11	.500
Michigan	4	–	10	.286	9	–	13	.409
Wisconsin	4	–	10	.286	6	–	16	.273
Northwestern	1	–	13	.071	2	–	20	.091
Rankings from AP Poll

The 1955–56 Iowa Hawkeyes men's basketball team represented the University of Iowa in intercollegiate basketball during the 1955–56 season. After opening the season 3–5, the team won 17 consecutive games to finish with a 20–6 record (13–1 in Big Ten), and won their second straight Big Ten title. The Hawkeyes also made their second consecutive trip to the Final Four, defeating Temple before falling to the unbeaten, back-to-back National champion San Francisco Dons in the title game.

== Roster ==
The group of seniors on this team – Sharm Scheuerman, Bill Logan, Carl Cain, Bill Seaberg and Bill Schoof – are known to Hawkeye fans as the "Fabulous Five."

1955–56 Iowa Hawkeyes men's basketball team
Players
Coaches

Pos.	#	Name	Height	Weight	Year	Previous school	Hometown
F	21	Carl Cain	6 ft 3 in (1.91 m)	—	Sr	Freeport High School	Freeport, IL
G	22	Bill Seaberg	6 ft 2 in (1.88 m)	—	Sr	–	Moline, IL
G	24	Augie Martel	5 ft 10 in (1.78 m)	—	Jr	–	–
C	31	Bill Logan	6 ft 6 in (1.98 m)	—	Sr	Keokuk High School	Keokuk, IA
F	33	Bill Schoof	6 ft 6 in (1.98 m)	—	Sr	–	Homewood, IL
F/C	35	Bob George	—	—	Sr	–	–
F	42	Tom Payne	6 ft 7 in (2.01 m)	—	So	Quincy Senior High School	Quincy, IL
G	46	Sharm Scheuerman	6 ft 2 in (1.88 m)	—	Sr	Rock Island High School	Moline, IL

Head coach

- Bucky O'Connor

Assistant coach(es)

Legend

- (C) Team captain
- (S) Suspended
- (I) Ineligible
- (W) Walk-on
- Injured
- Current redshirt

== Schedule/results ==
Date time, TV	Rank^{#}	Opponent^{#}	Result	Record	High points	High rebounds	High assists	Site (attendance) city, state
Regular season
12/4/1955*	No. 4	Nebraska; Rivalry	W 60–51	1–0	16 – Logan	–	–	Iowa Field House; Iowa City, IA
12/9/1955*	No. 4	SMU	W 80–62	2–0	17 – Seaberg	–	–	Iowa Field House; Iowa City, IA
12/12/1955*	No. 4	at Colorado	L 57–60	2–1	18 – Seaberg	–	–	Balch Fieldhouse; Boulder, CO
12/17/1955*; 8:00 pm	No. 4	Loyola (Los Angeles)	W 84–61	3–1	17 – Logan	–	–	Iowa Field House; Iowa City, IA
12/27/1955*	No. 6	at Washington	L 71–76	3–2	–	–	–	Hec Edmundson Pavilion; Seattle, WA
12/29/1955*	No. 6	at Stanford	L 52–54	3–3	–	–	–	Old Pavilion; Palo Alto, CA
12/30/1955*	No. 6	at California	L 45–70	3–4	–	–	–	Harmon Gym; Berkeley, CA
1/7/1956		No. 20 Michigan State	L 64–65	3–5 (0–1)	–	–	–	Iowa Field House; Iowa City, IA
1/9/1956		No. 10 Ohio State	W 88–73	4–5 (1–1)	–	–	–	Ohio Expo Center Coliseum; Columbus, OH
1/14/1956		Minnesota	W 84–62	5–5 (2–1)	–	–	–	Iowa Field House; Iowa City, IA
1/21/1956	No. 20	Michigan	W 78–67	6–5 (3–1)	–	–	–	Yost Field House; Ann Arbor, MI
1/23/1956	No. 20	Purdue	W 67–63	7–5 (4–1)	–	–	–	Lambert Fieldhouse; West Lafayette, IN
2/4/1956*	No. 19	Wichita	W 98–86	8–5	–	–	–	Iowa Field House; Iowa City, IA
2/6/1956	No. 19	Wisconsin	W 78–74	9–5 (5–1)	–	–	–	Wisconsin Field House; Madison, WI
2/11/1956	No. 17	at Northwestern	W 70–65	10–5 (6–1)	–	–	–	McGaw Hall; Evanston, IL
2/13/1956	No. 17	Purdue	W 88–75	11–5 (7–1)	–	–	–	Iowa Field House; Iowa City, IA
2/18/1956; 7:30 pm	No. 15	Wisconsin	W 80–66	12–5 (8–1)	–	–	–	Iowa Field House; Iowa City, IA
2/20/1956	No. 15	at Indiana	W 87–83	13–5 (9–1)	–	–	–	The Fieldhouse; Bloomington, IN
2/25/1956	No. 13	at Minnesota	W 83–73	14–5 (10–1)	–	–	–	Williams Arena; Minneapolis, MN
2/27/1956	No. 13	Northwestern	W 86–68	15–5 (11–1)	21 – Logan	–	–	Iowa Field House; Iowa City, IA
3/3/1956	No. 10	No. 2 Illinois	W 96–72	16–5 (12–1)	–	–	–	Iowa Field House; Iowa City, IA
3/5/1956	No. 10	Indiana	W 84–73	17–5 (13–1)	21 – Seaberg	–	–	Iowa Field House (14,900); Iowa City, IA
NCAA tournament
3/16/1956*	No. 4	vs. Morehead State; Midwest Regional semifinal	W 97–83	18–5	28 – Cain	14 – Cain	–	Iowa Field House; Iowa City, IA
3/17/1956*	No. 4	vs. No. 9 Kentucky; Midwest Regional Final	W 89–77	19–5	34 – Cain	13 – Logan	–	Iowa Field House; Iowa City, IA
3/22/1956*	No. 4	vs. No. 15 Temple; National semifinal	W 83–76	20–5	36 – Logan	18 – Schoof	–	McGaw Hall; Evanston, IL
3/23/1956*	No. 4	vs. No. 1 San Francisco; National Championship	L 71–83	20–6	17 – Tied	15 – Logan	–	McGaw Hall; Evanston, IL
*Non-conference game. ^{#}Rankings from AP Poll. (#) Tournament seedings in parentheses. MW=Midwest.

== Rankings ==
Ranking movements Legend: ██ Increase in ranking ██ Decrease in ranking — = Not ranked
	Week															
Poll	Pre	1	2	3	4	5	6	7	8	9	10	11	12	13	14	Final
AP	Not released	5	4	10	6	—	—	20	13	19	17	15	13	10	5	4
Coaches	5	5	4	6	5	16	—	—	13	12	16	13	12	9	4	Not released

== Awards and honors ==
- Carl Cain – Honorable Mention AP All-American
- Bill Logan – Honorable Mention AP All-American
