= Robin Freeman (basketball) =

American basketball player

Personal information
- Born: April 8, 1934 Cincinnati, Ohio, U.S.
- Died: September 23, 2014 (aged 80) Columbus, Ohio, U.S.
- Listed height: 5 ft 11 in (1.80 m)
- Listed weight: 160 lb (73 kg)

Career information
- High school: Hughes (Cincinnati, Ohio)
- College: Ohio State (1953–1956)
- NBA draft: 1956: 4th round, 25th overall pick
- Drafted by: St. Louis Hawks
- Position: Guard
- Number: 24

Career highlights
- Consensus first-team All-American (1956); Consensus second-team All-American (1955); Chicago Tribune Silver Basketball (Big Ten MVP) (1956); 2× First-team All-Big Ten (1955, 1956)
- Stats at Basketball Reference

Robin R. Freeman (April 8, 1934 – September 23, 2014) was an American basketball player who was a two-time All-American at Ohio State University.

Freeman, a 5'11 guard from Hughes High School in Cincinnati, set an Ohio state high school scoring mark of 39.5 points per game as a senior in 1951–52.

Robin Freeman played at OSU from 1953 to 1956, has been called one of the most exciting players in Buckeye history. He broke out as a junior in 1954–55, scoring at a 31.5 point per game clip. His season was limited to just 13 games due to a variety of health issues, but Freeman was still named a Consensus second team All-American at the season's end. He picked up where he left off as a senior, averaging 32.9 points per contest (good for second in the nation behind Furman's Darrell Floyd). Freeman became Ohio State's first repeat All-American and the first player in Big Ten history to average 30+ points per game in back to back years. Freeman was also named Big Ten MVP by the Chicago Tribune.

Following the conclusion of his Ohio State career, Freeman was selected in the 1956 NBA draft by the Saint Louis Hawks. However, he never played in the NBA, as he severed the tips of two fingers while chopping wood. He instead attended law school and practiced law in Springfield, Ohio.

He is a member of the Ohio basketball Hall of Fame and the Ohio State Athletic Hall of Fame.

Freeman died on September 23, 2014.
