= Jorgy =

Jorgy may refer to:

- Holger Jorgensen (1927-2020), Alaskan bush and commercial airline pilot - see Alaska Territorial Guard
- Noble Jorgensen (1925–1982), American basketball player
- Tom Jorgensen (c. 1935–2013), American college basketball coach and player sometimes known as Jorgy
- Andrew "Jorgy" Jorgenson, a main character in the 1991 film Other People's Money, played by Gregory Peck
- Jorge Luiz Frello Filho, known as Jorginho, or simply Jorgy, plays as a midfielder for Premier League club Arsenal
