= 1955–56 Indiana Hoosiers men's basketball team =

American college basketball season

1955–56 Indiana Hoosiers men's basketball
- Conference: Big Ten Conference
- Record: 13–9 (6–8 Big Ten)
- Head coach: Branch McCracken (15th season)
- Assistant coaches: Lou Watson; Ernie Andres
- Captain: Wally Choice
- Home arena: The Fieldhouse

1955–56 Big Ten Conference men's basketball standings
	Conf.				Overall
Team	W		L	PCT	W		L	PCT
No. 4 Iowa	13	–	1	.929	20	–	6	.769
No. 10 Illinois	11	–	3	.786	18	–	4	.818
Ohio State	9	–	5	.643	16	–	6	.727
Purdue	9	–	5	.643	16	–	6	.727
Michigan State	7	–	7	.500	13	–	9	.591
Indiana	6	–	8	.429	13	–	9	.591
Minnesota	6	–	8	.429	11	–	11	.500
Michigan	4	–	10	.286	9	–	13	.409
Wisconsin	4	–	10	.286	6	–	16	.273
Northwestern	1	–	13	.071	2	–	20	.091
Rankings from AP Poll

The 1955–56 Indiana Hoosiers men's basketball team represented Indiana University. Their head coach was Branch McCracken, who was in his 15th year. The team played its home games in The Fieldhouse in Bloomington, Indiana, and was a member of the Big Ten Conference.

The Hoosiers finished the regular season with an overall record of 13–9 and a conference record of 6–8, finishing 6th in the Big Ten Conference. Indiana was not invited to participate in any postseason tournament.

== Roster ==
No.	Name	Position	Ht.	Year	Hometown
13	Charlie Brown	F	6–2	So.	Chicago
14	Paxton Lumpkin	G	6–1	So.	Chicago
15	Sam Gee	G	6–1	So.	Washington, Indiana
20	Jim Barley	G	6–2	Sr.	Marion, Indiana
21	Hallie Bryant	G	6–3	Jr.	Indianapolis
22	Warren Fisher	F	6–3	Sr.	Fort Wayne, Indiana
23	Jim Phipps	G	5–11	Sr.	Kokomo, Indiana
24	Ray Ball	F	6–3	So.	Elkhart, Indiana
30	Charlie Hodson	G	5–9	Jr.	Muncie, Indiana
31	Pete Obremskey	F	6–3	Jr.	Jeffersonville, Indiana
32	Dick Custer	C	6–6	So.	Parkersburg, West Virginia
33	Archie Dees	C	6–8	So.	Mount Carmel, Illinois
35	Dick Neal	F	6–5	Jr.	Reelsville, Indiana
43	Cliff Williamson	F	6–3	Sr.	Kokomo, Indiana
44	Wally Choice	F	6–4	Sr.	Montclair, New Jersey
45	Jerry Thompson	F	6–5	So.	South Bend, Indiana

== Schedule/results ==
Date time, TV	Rank^{#}	Opponent^{#}	Result	Record	Site city, state
Regular season
12/3/1955*		Ohio	W 93–74	1–0	The Fieldhouse; Bloomington, Indiana
12/10/1955*		Kansas State	W 96–72	2–0	The Fieldhouse; Bloomington, Indiana
12/12/1955*		Saint Louis	L 75–86	2–1	The Fieldhouse; Bloomington, Indiana
12/17/1955*	No. 19	at Missouri	W 81–78	3–1	Brewer Fieldhouse; Columbia, Missouri
12/19/1955*	No. 19	Cincinnati	W 80–61	4–1	The Fieldhouse; Bloomington, Indiana
12/22/1955*	No. 18	at Drake	W 82–79	5–1	Drake Fieldhouse; Des Moines, Iowa
12/27/1955*		at Butler	W 94–70	6–1	Butler Fieldhouse; Indianapolis
1/2/1956		Northwestern	W 94–81	7–1 (1–0)	The Fieldhouse; Bloomington, Indiana
1/7/1956	No. 13	at Wisconsin	W 75–71	8–1 (2–0)	Wisconsin Field House; Madison, Wisconsin
1/9/1956	No. 13	at Minnesota	L 71–77	8–2 (2–1)	Williams Arena; Minneapolis
1/14/1956	No. 12	Illinois; Rivalry	L 72–96	8–3 (2–2)	The Fieldhouse; Bloomington, Indiana
1/16/1956	No. 12	Michigan State	W 79–70	9–3 (3–2)	The Fieldhouse; Bloomington, Indiana
1/30/1956*		Notre Dame	W 81–76	10–3 (3–2)	The Fieldhouse; Bloomington, Indiana
2/4/1956		at Ohio State	L 82–100	10–4 (3–3)	Ohio Expo Center Coliseum; Columbus, Ohio
2/6/1956		at Illinois; Rivalry	L 89–92	10–5 (3–4)	Huff Hall; Champaign, Illinois
2/11/1956		Michigan	W 97–73	11–5 (4–4)	The Fieldhouse; Bloomington, Indiana
2/13/1956		Wisconsin	L 67–69	11–6 (4–5)	The Fieldhouse; Bloomington, Indiana
2/18/1956		at Michigan	W 80–75	12–6 (5–5)	Yost Field House; Ann Arbor, Michigan
2/20/1956		Iowa	L 83–87	12–7 (5–6)	The Fieldhouse; Bloomington, Indiana
2/25/1956		at Northwestern	W 84–82	13–7 (6–6)	Welsh-Ryan Arena; Evanston, Illinois
3/3/1956		Purdue; Rivalry	L 71–73	13–8 (6–7)	The Fieldhouse; Bloomington, Indiana
3/5/1956		at Iowa	L 73–84	13–9 (6–8)	Iowa Field House; Iowa City, Iowa
*Non-conference game. ^{#}Rankings from AP Poll. (#) Tournament seedings in parentheses.
