= Jay Handlan =

American basketball player (1928–2013)

Personal information
- Born: February 2, 1928 Wheeling, West Virginia, U.S.
- Died: January 10, 2013 (aged 84)
- Listed height: 6 ft 2 in (1.88 m)

Career information
- High school: Triadelphia (Wheeling, West Virginia)
- College: Washington and Lee (1948–1952)
- NBA draft: 1952: – round, –
- Drafted by: Indianapolis Olympians
- Position: Forward

Career history
- 1953–1954: Akron Goodyears

Career highlights
- 3× honorable mention All-American; 2× All-Southern Conference
- Stats at Basketball Reference

John Bernard "Jay" Handlan (February 2, 1928 – January 10, 2013) was an American college basketball star at Washington and Lee University in Lexington, Virginia from 1948 to 1952. He was born in Wheeling, West Virginia. A 6 ft 2 in (1.88 m) forward, Handlan is best known for being a prolific scorer and for setting the still–standing National Collegiate Athletic Association (NCAA) record for field goal attempts in a game with 71.

== College career ==
During his four-year career with the W&L Generals, Handlan set two NCAA basketball records, including most free throws made in a single game without a miss (18) and field goal attempts (71). The former record has since been broken, but the 71 field goal attempts is a record that will probably last forever, given today's focus on team-concept basketball and a slower-style pace of play. The attempts record occurred on February 17, 1951 in a 97–82 win over Furman University. Handlan scored 66 points that game, which is in the NCAA Division I top five record for most points in a game by a single player. He shot 30-for-71 in field goal attempts but missed his first seven shots. He scored 49 of his 66 points in the first half alone. When asked about his 71 shot attempts and school-record 66 points performance, Handlan offered his rationale for why he was allowed to do so:

We weren't super formidable. I was the only scholarship player on the team. That night was sort of a planned situation. It was 'Let's see what I can get.' To be honest, I was tired at the half.

Handlan owns the highest single-season scoring average (26.7 points per game) in Washington and Lee history as well as the top career scoring average (21.3 points per game). In his last collegiate game, played on March 1, 1952 against West Virginia University, Handlan surpassed the 2,000-point threshold to become just the third player to score 2,000+ points in major college basketball history. He entered that contest with 1,987 points and scored 15, finishing his Washington and Lee career with 2,002 points—currently the second highest in school history behind Dom Flora's 2,310.

== Later life ==
Shortly after he concluded his college career, Handlan was drafted by the National Basketball Association (NBA)'s Indianapolis Olympians in the 1952 draft. However, he never played a game in the NBA. He instead played in the Amateur Athletic Union (AAU) for a brief period, including a selection in 1953–54 as an all-star while playing for the Akron Goodyears.

He eventually became the president of an engineering firm in Philadelphia, Pennsylvania and owned a house in New Jersey.

Handlan died on January 10, 2013.

== See also ==
- List of NCAA Division I men's basketball players with 60 or more points in a game
