= Gale McArthur =

American basketball player (1929–2020)

Personal information
- Born: March 6, 1929 Mangum, Oklahoma, U.S.
- Died: January 2, 2020 (aged 90) Ponca City, Oklahoma, U.S.
- Listed height: 6 ft 2 in (1.88 m)
- Listed weight: 185 lb (84 kg)

Career information
- High school: Mangum (Mangum, Oklahoma)
- College: Oklahoma State (1948–1951)
- NBA draft: 1951: 4th round, 39th overall pick
- Drafted by: Minneapolis Lakers
- Position: Guard
- Number: 55

Career highlights
- Consensus second-team All-American (1951); First-team All-MVC (1951)
- Stats at Basketball Reference

Gale Eugene McArthur (March 6, 1929 – January 2, 2020) was an All-American basketball player at Oklahoma A&M University (now Oklahoma State).

McArthur, a 6-foot-2-inch (188 cm) guard from Mangum, Oklahoma, attended Oklahoma A&M and played basketball for Hall of Fame coach Henry Iba from 1948 to 1951. During his time in Stillwater, McArthur played on two Final Four teams, playing in the NCAA championship game in 1949 (a 46–36 loss to Kentucky) as a sophomore and the national semifinals as a senior in 1951.

In that senior year of 1950–51, McArthur averaged 11.6 points per game and led the Aggies to a 29–6 record. The team won the Missouri Valley Conference for the second time in McArthur's career.

After graduation from Oklahoma A&M, McArthur was drafted by the Minneapolis Lakers in the 1951 NBA draft. However, McArthur opted for dental school instead, ultimately starting his own practice in Ponca City, Oklahoma. He died on January 2, 2020.
