= Kevin Bradshaw =

American-Israeli basketball player

Personal information
- Born: February 13, 1965 (age 61) Gainesville, Florida
- Listed height: 6 ft 6 in (1.98 m)

Career information
- High school: Buchholz (Gainesville, Florida)
- College: Bethune–Cookman (1983–1985); US International (1989–1991)
- NBA draft: 1991: undrafted
- Position: Shooting guard
- Coaching career: 2004–present

Career history

Coaching
- 2005–2009: Hapoel Eilat B.C. (assistant)
- 2009–2014: Point Loma Nazarene

Career highlights
- NCAA scoring champion (1991)

Kevin Bradshaw (born February 13, 1965) is an American-Israeli former professional basketball player and college basketball coach. He is best known as the NCAA record-holder for most points in a single game against a Division I opponent.

Bradshaw played and coached in Israel for 16 years, during which he married an Israeli citizen, obtained Israeli citizenship, and served in the Israel Defense Forces (IDF) reserves.

== College career ==
Bradshaw, a 6'6" guard, played high school basketball at Buchholz High School in Gainesville, Florida. Playing alongside future NBA player Vernon Maxwell, Bradshaw averaged 30.6 points per game as a senior in 1983 and was named first team All-State.

Bradshaw turned down his hometown Florida Gators, instead opting to play for the smaller Bethune–Cookman University. After his sophomore season, he left the school and joined the Navy. After being stationed on a submarine tender near San Diego, Bradshaw began playing with the All-Navy team. He would go on to travel the country playing with the Navy All Stars and later the All-Armed Forces team, alongside future NBA star David Robinson. After getting permission from the Navy to once again pursue his education, Bradshaw was recruited by Gary Zarecky, head coach of the Gulls of U.S. International University, who saw a great fit for his team's fast-paced style of play. It was the perfect match of player and system, as Bradshaw went on to lead the NCAA in scoring as a senior in 1990–91 at 37.6 points per game.

On January 5, 1991, Bradshaw made NCAA history as he scored 72 points for the Gulls in a 186–140 loss to Loyola Marymount University – a meeting of two teams specializing in that fast-break style of play. This performance broke Pete Maravich's NCAA record for most points scored against a Division I opponent. The previous record had been 69 points, set by Maravich in a 1970 game against Alabama.

Bradshaw ended his college career with 2,804 points – currently #16 on the all-time NCAA career scoring list.

=== College statistics ===
Season Averages
Season	Team	G	PTS	PPG	REB	AST	STL	BLK	FG%	3P%	FT%
1983–84	Bethune–Cookman Wildcats	28	361	12.9	2.8	1.3	–	–	.435	–	.686
1984–85	Bethune–Cookman Wildcats	27	514	19.0	4.4	1.6	–	–	.430	–	.698
1989–90	US International Gulls	28	875	31.3	4.9	2.5	1.7	0.5	.412	.338	.844
1990–91	US International Gulls	28	1054	37.6	5.1	2.4	1.8	1.0	.428	.316	.822
Totals:		111	2804	25.3	4.3	1.9	1.7	0.8	.425	.328	.801

== Post-college ==
After failing to catch on with the NBA, Bradshaw played professionally in Israel for eleven years. He set numerous offensive records there, including once scoring 101 points in a game. After his playing career was over he became the first African-American coach in Israeli professional basketball history, guiding Hapoel Eilat to a 58–39 record in three years with the team. In 2008, he returned to the US and spent two years as an assistant coach at NAIA school Point Loma Nazarene University in San Diego, California. He became a teacher and coach at an inner-city high school (King-Chavez) in San Diego, while running "Be the Best" basketball camps, which tours nationwide and internationally in Israel, providing instruction for children of all ages.

== See also ==
- List of basketball players who have scored 100 points in a single game
- List of NCAA Division I men's basketball players with 60 or more points in a game
- List of NCAA Division I men's basketball season scoring leaders
