= Rob Judson =

American men's basketball coach (born 1958)

Current position
- Title: Assistant Coach
- Team: Illinois State
- Conference: Missouri Valley

Biographical details
- Born: January 13, 1958 (age 68)

Playing career
- 1976–1980: Illinois

Coaching career (HC unless noted)
- 1981–1983: Wauconda HS
- 1983–1989: Glenbrook South HS
- 1989–1991: Northern Illinois (assistant)
- 1991–1996: Bradley (assistant)
- 1996–2001: Illinois (assistant)
- 2001–2007: Northern Illinois
- 2007–2013: Illinois State (assistant)
- 2015–2017: Indiana (assistant)
- 2017–2022: Marquette (Spec. asst. to HC)
- 2022–present: Illinois State (assistant)

Administrative career (AD unless noted)
- 2014–2015: Indiana (Dir. Basketball Ops)

Head coaching record
- Overall: 74–101 (.423)

Rob Judson (born January 13, 1958) is an American men's basketball coach who is currently an assistant coach at Illinois State. He was the head coach at the Northern Illinois University from 2001 to 2007 and held assistant positions at Bradley, Illinois, and Indiana. He played college basketball at the University of Illinois from 1976 to 1980.

Inducted into the Illinois Basketball Coaches Association's Hall of Fame as a player in 1990. He is the son of Phil Judson and nephew of All-American basketball player Paul Judson and Major League Baseball player Howie Judson.

== Head coaching record ==
Record table
Season	Team	Overall	Conference	Standing	Postseason
Northern Illinois Huskies (MAC) (2001–2007)
2001–02	Northern Illinois	12–16	8–10	4th (West)	
2002–03	Northern Illinois	17–14	11–7	2nd (West)	
2003–04	Northern Illinois	10–20	5–13	6th (West)	
2004–05	Northern Illinois	11–17	7–11	5th (West)	
2005–06	Northern Illinois	17–11	12–6	1st (West)	
2006–07	Northern Illinois	7–23	4–12	6th (West)	
Northern Illinois:		74–101 (.423)	47–59 (.443)		
Total:		74–101 (.423)			
National champion Postseason invitational champion Conference regular season champion Conference regular season and conference tournament champion Division regular season champion Division regular season and conference tournament champion Conference tournament champion
