= 1955 NCAA Men's Basketball All-Americans =

- Awarded for: 1954–55 NCAA men's basketball season

The consensus 1955 College Basketball All-American team, as determined by aggregating the results of six major All-American teams. To earn "consensus" status, a player must win honors from a majority of the following teams: the Associated Press, Look Magazine, The United Press International, the Newspaper Enterprise Association (NEA), Collier's Magazine and the International News Service.

== 1955 Consensus All-America team ==
Consensus First Team
Player	Position	Class	Team
Dick Garmaker	G	Senior	Minnesota
Tom Gola	F	Senior	La Salle
Sihugo Green	G	Junior	Duquesne
Dick Ricketts	F/C	Senior	Duquesne
Bill Russell	C	Junior	San Francisco

Consensus Second Team
Player	Position	Class	Team
Darrell Floyd	G	Junior	Furman
Robin Freeman	G	Junior	Ohio State
Dickie Hemric	C	Senior	Wake Forest
Don Schlundt	C	Senior	Indiana
Ronnie Shavlik	F/C	Junior	North Carolina State

== Individual All-America teams ==
All-America Team
All-America Team	First team		Second team		Third team	
All-America Team	Player	School	Player	School	Player	School
Associated Press	Darrell Floyd	Furman	Dick Garmaker	Minnesota	Dick Boushka	Saint Louis
Associated Press	Robin Freeman	Ohio State	Sihugo Green	Duquesne	Bob Burrow	Kentucky
Associated Press	Tom Gola	La Salle	Dickie Hemric	Wake Forest	Tom Heinsohn	Holy Cross
Associated Press	Dick Ricketts	Duquesne	Don Schlundt	Indiana	Maurice Stokes	St. Francis (PA)
Associated Press	Bill Russell	San Francisco	Ronnie Shavlik	North Carolina State	Buzz Wilkinson	Virginia
UPI	Dick Garmaker	Minnesota	Darrell Floyd	Furman	Tom Heinsohn	Holy Cross
UPI	Tom Gola	La Salle	Robin Freeman	Ohio State	Johnny Horan	Dayton
UPI	Sihugo Green	Duquesne	Dickie Hemric	Wake Forest	Ken Sears	Santa Clara
UPI	Dick Ricketts	Duquesne	Don Schlundt	Indiana	Jack Stephens	Notre Dame
UPI	Bill Russell	San Francisco	Ronnie Shavlik	North Carolina State	Maurice Stokes	St. Francis (PA)
Look Magazine	Ed Conlin	Fordham	No second or third teams (10-man first team)			
Look Magazine	Frank Ehmann	Northwestern	No second or third teams (10-man first team)			
Look Magazine	Dick Garmaker	Minnesota	No second or third teams (10-man first team)			
Look Magazine	Tom Gola	La Salle	No second or third teams (10-man first team)			
Look Magazine	Sihugo Green	Duquesne	No second or third teams (10-man first team)			
Look Magazine	Dickie Hemric	Wake Forest	No second or third teams (10-man first team)			
Look Magazine	Bob Patterson	Tulsa	No second or third teams (10-man first team)			
Look Magazine	Dick Ricketts	Duquesne	No second or third teams (10-man first team)			
Look Magazine	Bill Russell	San Francisco	No second or third teams (10-man first team)			
Look Magazine	Maurice Stokes	St. Francis (PA)	No second or third teams (10-man first team)			
NEA	Dick Garmaker	Minnesota	Ed Conlin	Fordham	Art Bunte	Utah
NEA	Tom Gola	La Salle	Dick Ricketts	Duquesne	Tom Heinsohn	Holy Cross
NEA	Sihugo Green	Duquesne	Ronnie Shavlik	North Carolina State	Bob Patterson	Tulsa
NEA	Dickie Hemric	Wake Forest	Maurice Stokes	St. Francis (PA)	Don Schlundt	Indiana
NEA	Bill Russell	San Francisco	Jack Twyman	Cincinnati	Ken Sears	Santa Clara
International News Service	Dick Garmaker	Minnesota	Art Bunte	Utah	No third team	
International News Service	Tom Gola	La Salle	Dickie Hemric	Wake Forest	No third team	
International News Service	Sihugo Green	Duquesne	Bob McKeen	California	No third team	
International News Service	Bill Russell	San Francisco	Dick Ricketts	Duquesne	No third team	
International News Service	Ronnie Shavlik	North Carolina State	Jack Twyman	Cincinnati	No third team	
Collier's	Robin Freeman	Ohio State	Dick Garmaker	Minnesota	Jesse Arnelle	Penn State
Collier's	Tom Gola	La Salle	Tom Heinsohn	Holy Cross	Ed Conlin	Fordham
Collier's	Sihugo Green	Duquesne	Dickie Hemric	Wake Forest	Darrell Floyd	Furman
Collier's	Dick Ricketts	Duquesne	Jack Stephens	Notre Dame	Ronnie Shavlik	North Carolina State
Collier's	Don Schlundt	Indiana	Bill Russell	San Francisco	Maurice Stokes	St. Francis (PA)

AP Honorable Mention:

- Jesse Arnelle, Penn State
- Denver Brackeen, Ole Miss
- Art Bunte, Utah
- Carl Cain, Iowa
- Ed Conlin, Fordham
- Walter Devlin, George Washington
- Frank Ehmann, Northwestern
- Bill Evans, Kentucky
- Ed Fleming, Niagara
- Swede Halbrook, Oregon State
- Jerry Harper, Alabama
- Joe Holup, George Washington
- Johnny Horan, Dayton
- Rod Hundley, West Virginia
- Cleo Littleton, Wichita State
- Bob McKeen, California
- Chuck Mencel, Minnesota
- Warren Mills, Richmond
- Johnny Moore, UCLA
- Jerry Mullen, San Francisco
- Dick O'Neal, Texas Christian
- Bob Patterson, Tulsa
- Art Quimby, Connecticut
- Jim Reed, Texas Tech
- Bill Ridley, Illinois
- Ken Sears, Santa Clara
- Jack Stephens, Notre Dame
- Ron Tomsic, Stanford
- Jack Twyman, Cincinnati
- Dick Welsh, Southern California

== See also ==
- 1954–55 NCAA men's basketball season
