= Paul Judson =

American basketball player (1934–2023)

Personal information
- Born: April 10, 1934 Hebron, Illinois, U.S.
- Died: June 5, 2023 (aged 89) West Dundee, Illinois, U.S.
- Listed height: 6 ft 3 in (1.91 m)
- Listed weight: 170 lb (77 kg)

Career information
- High school: Alden-Hebron (Hebron, Illinois)
- College: Illinois (1953–1956)
- NBA draft: 1956: 2nd round, 12th overall pick
- Drafted by: Syracuse Nationals
- Position: Guard

Career highlights
- Third-team All-American – UPI, NEA (1956)
- Stats at Basketball Reference

Paul B. Judson (April 10, 1934 – June 5, 2023) was an American basketball player. He was selected as the twelfth pick in the 1956 NBA draft, but did not play in the National Basketball Association (NBA).

== Basketball ==
In high school, he helped lead Alden-Hebron High School to the 1952 Illinois high school basketball state championship. Judson served as the team captain for the 1955–56 Illinois Fighting Illini men's basketball team and helped guide them to an 18–4 record. He was named an honorable mention All-American by the Associated Press in his final college season.

== Personal life ==
His brother, Howie Judson, played for the Chicago White Sox from 1948 to 1952 and the Cincinnati Redlegs from 1953 to 1954.

Twin brother Phil Judson was also teammate on the same Fighting Illini basketball teams.

Uncle to former Northern Illinois University head coach, Rob Judson. Rob is the son of Phil.

Paul Judson died on June 5, 2023, at the age of 89.

== Honors ==
- 1955 – Team MVP
- 1955 – 1st Team All-Big Ten
- 1955 – Honorable Mention All American
- 1955 – University of Illinois Athlete of the Year
- 1956 – Team Captain
- 1956 – Consensus 1st Team All-Big Ten
- 1956 – 3rd Team All American
- 1973 – Inducted into the Illinois Basketball Coaches Association's Hall of Fame as a player.

== College statistics ==
=== University of Illinois ===
Season	Games	Points	Field Goals	Attempts	Avg	Free Throws	Attempts	Avg	PPG
1953–54	22	246	92	244	.377	62	79	.785	11.2
1954–55	22	363	139	343	.405	85	119	.714	16.5
1955–56	22	404	160	388	.412	84	113	.743	18.4
Totals	66	1013	391	975	.401	231	311	.743	15.3
