= List of NCAA Division I men's basketball players with 60 or more points in a game =

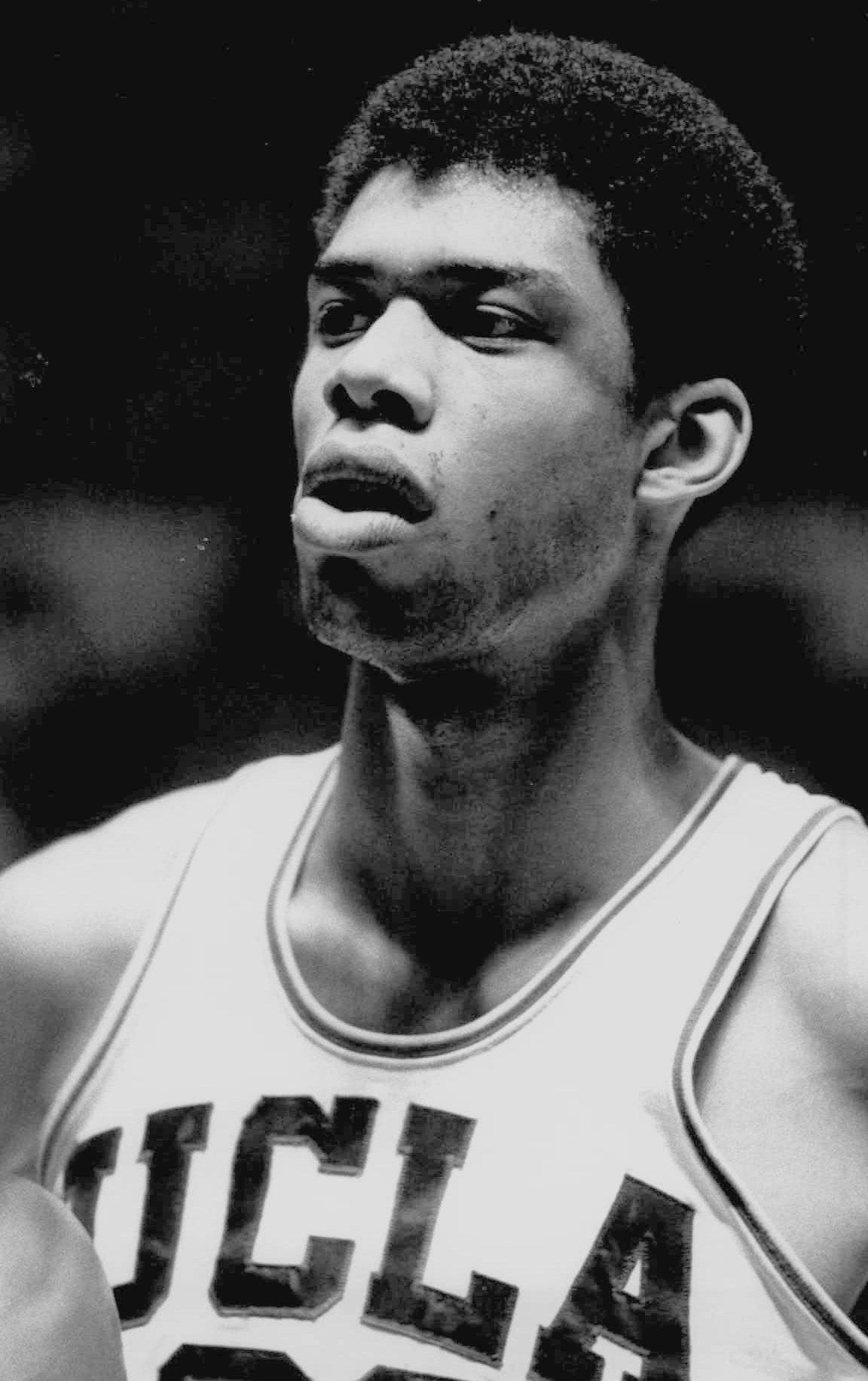
Lew Alcindor (later known as Kareem Abdul-Jabbar), who once scored 61 points, is also in the Basketball Hall of Fame.

In basketball, points are the sum of the score accumulated through free throws and field goals. The National Collegiate Athletic Association's (NCAA) Division I is the highest level of amateur basketball in the United States. The NCAA did not split into its current divisions format until August 1973. From 1906 to 1955, there were no classifications to the NCAA nor its predecessor, the Intercollegiate Athletic Association of the United States (IAAUS). Then, from 1956 to 1973, colleges were classified as either "NCAA University Division (Major College)" or "NCAA College Division (Small College)". This is a comprehensive list (through the 2011–12 season) of all occurrences of an NCAA Division I men's basketball player scoring 60 or more points in a single game. The official NCAA men's basketball media guide includes two lists: one listing all 60+ point games against Division I opponents and the other listing all 60+ point games against non-Division I opponents.

The all-time record against a Division I opponent is 72 points. It was set by U.S. International's Kevin Bradshaw, a 6 ft 6 in (1.98 m) guard, on January 5, 1991, against Loyola Marymount in the highest-scoring game in Division I history. Loyola Marymount defeated U.S. International 186–140. Bradshaw shot 23 for 59 in field goal attempts overall (7 of 22 from three-point range) and made 19 of 23 free throws in his record-setting performance. After the game, Bradshaw reflected on the achievement, "I'm still completely stunned. I wasn't gunning for the record until the last 10 minutes. That's when the bench became aware of the mark and the coaches allowed me to go for it. I won't be celebrating because we lost the game." He also remarked on how he was even able to put himself in the position to break Pete Maravich's record of 69 points: "Our style of play allows for the freelancing that we do. I have to put up the ball a lot because we don't have a lot of shooters on the team."

Among the players who have scored 60+ points against Division I opponents, only LSU's Maravich, Oral Roberts' Anthony Roberts and Ole Miss' Johnny Neumann appear on the list more than once. Maravich's four career 60+ point games is the most in NCAA Division I history. Five players who achieved the feat against a Division I opponent—Maravich, Calvin Murphy, Oscar Robertson, Lew Alcindor (later Kareem Abdul-Jabbar) and Elgin Baylor—are all inductees in the Naismith Memorial Basketball Hall of Fame. Meanwhile, three players who achieved the feat against non-Division I opponents are also Hall of Fame inductees: Paul Arizin, Elvin Hayes, and Bob Pettit.

The highest scoring performance in NCAA Division I basketball history, regardless of the opponent's classification, is 100 points, scored by Frank Selvy of Furman against Newberry College on February 13, 1954. He made a still-standing NCAA record 41 field goals on 66 attempts. He made his final shot of the game—scoring his 99th and 100th points—with only two seconds remaining on a 40-foot attempt. Selvy later said, "I'll say that I made at least eight or nine baskets that would have been three-pointers today. Plus they didn't have the one-and-one in those days." The performance occurred during Selvy's senior season in which he led the nation in scoring at 41.7 points per game. He also led the nation in scoring the previous year at 29.5 points per game. Coincidentally, a teammate of Selvy's for one season, Darrell Floyd, is the only player who has scored 60 or more points against both a Division I and a non-Division I opponent. Floyd scored 62 points against The Citadel (Division I) and 67 against (then) non-Division I Morehead State.

== Key ==
Pos.	G	F	C	Ref.
Position	Guard	Forward	Center	References

Class (Cl.) key
Fr	Freshman	So	Sophomore	Jr	Junior	Sr	Senior

*	Elected to the Naismith Memorial Basketball Hall of Fame
Player (X)	Denotes the number of times the player appears on the list

== Against Division I opponents ==
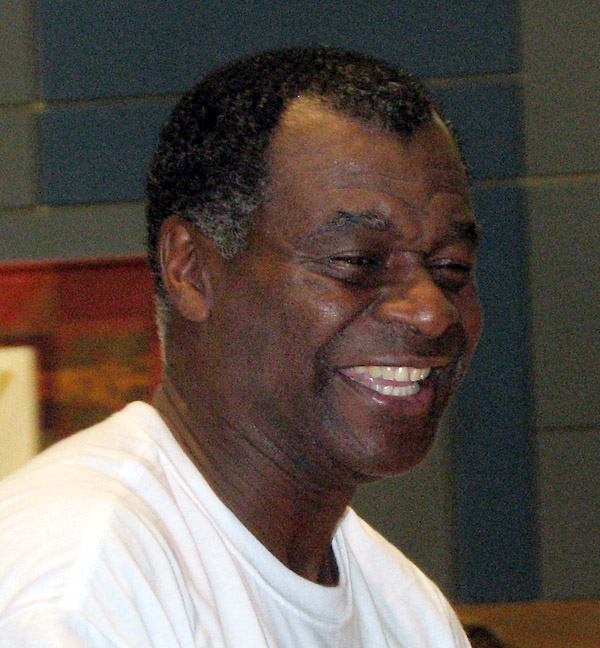
Point guard Calvin Murphy is responsible for the third-highest output against a Division I opponent (68 points).

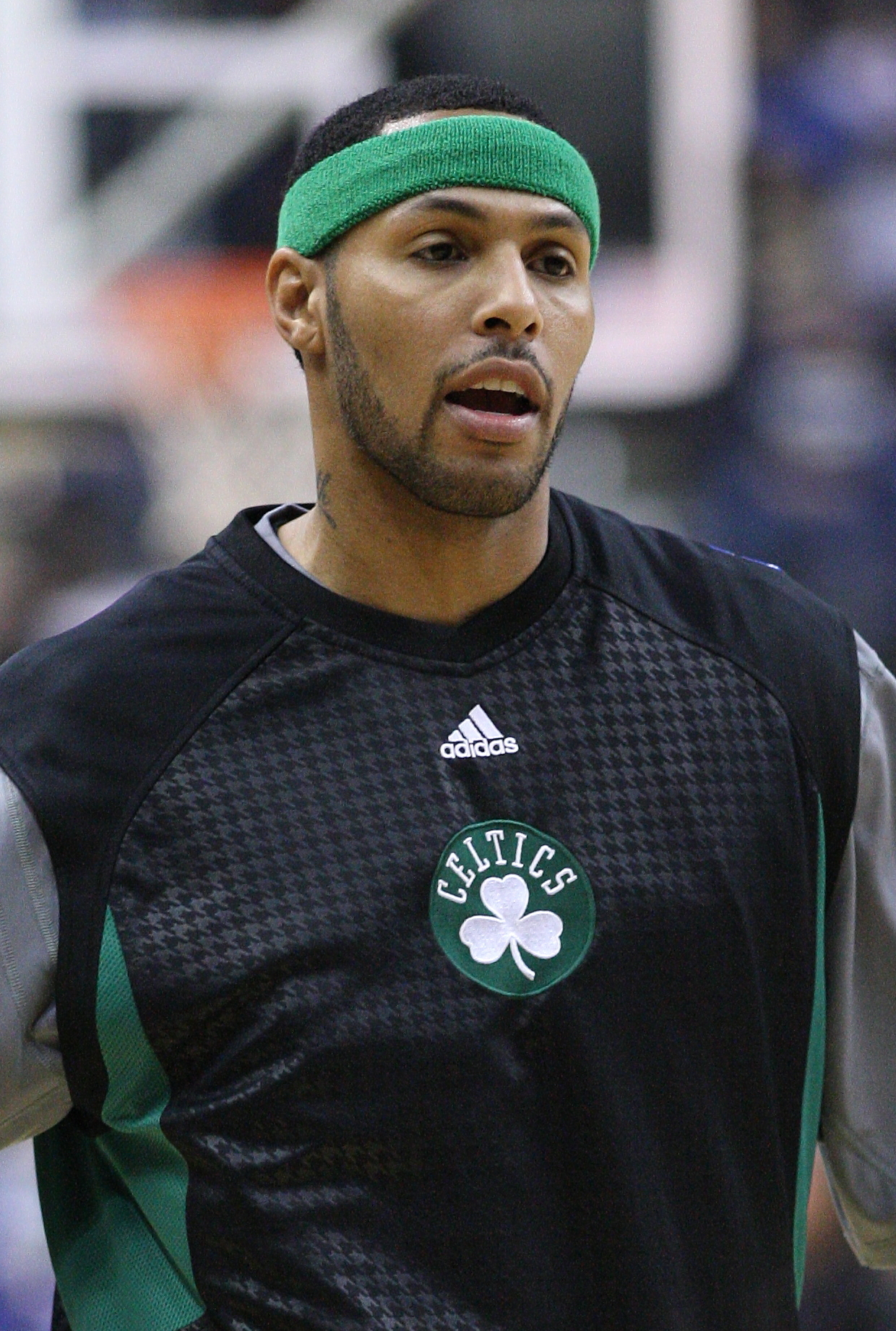
Eddie House once scored 61 points while playing for Arizona State.

Points	Player	Pos.	Cl.	Team	Opponent	Date	Ref.
72	Kevin Bradshaw	G	Sr	U.S. International	Loyola Marymount	January 5, 1991	
69	Pete Maravich*	G	Sr	LSU	Alabama	February 7, 1970	
68	Calvin Murphy*	G	Jr	Niagara	Syracuse	December 7, 1968	
66	Jay Handlan	F	Jr	Washington and Lee	Furman	February 17, 1951	
66	Pete Maravich* (2)	G	Jr	LSU	Tulane	February 10, 1969	
66	Anthony Roberts	F/G	Sr	Oral Roberts	North Carolina A&T	February 19, 1977	
65	Scott Haffner	G	Sr	Evansville	Dayton	February 18, 1989	
65 ^{(NIT)}	Anthony Roberts (2)	F/G	Sr	Oral Roberts	Oregon	March 9, 1977	
64	Pete Maravich* (3)	G	Sr	LSU	Kentucky	February 21, 1970	
63	Hersey Hawkins	G	Sr	Bradley	Detroit	February 22, 1988	
63	Johnny Neumann	F/G	So	Ole Miss	LSU	January 30, 1971	
63 ^{(4OT)}	Ryan Toolson	G	Sr	Utah Valley	Chicago State	January 29, 2009	
62	Darrell Floyd	G	Sr	Furman	The Citadel	January 14, 1956	
62 ^{(NIT)}	Askia Jones	G	Sr	Kansas State	Fresno State	March 24, 1994	
62	Oscar Robertson*	G/F	Sr	Cincinnati	North Texas	February 6, 1960	
61	Lew Alcindor*	C	So	UCLA	Washington State	February 25, 1967	
61 ^{(NCAAT)}	Austin Carr	G	Jr	Notre Dame	Ohio	March 7, 1970	
61 ^{(2OT)}	Eddie House	G	Sr	Arizona State	California	January 8, 2000	
61	Pete Maravich* (4)	G	Sr	LSU	Vanderbilt	December 11, 1969	
61	Rick Mount	G	Sr	Purdue	Iowa	February 28, 1970	
61	Wayman Tisdale	F/C	So	Oklahoma	UTSA	December 28, 1983	
60	Elgin Baylor*	F	Jr	Seattle	Portland	January 30, 1958	
60	Billy McGill	C/F	Sr	Utah	BYU	February 24, 1962	
60	John Mengelt	G	Jr	Auburn	Alabama	February 14, 1970	
60	Johnny Neumann (2)	F/G	So	Ole Miss	Baylor	December 29, 1970	
60 ^{(3OT)}	Ben Woodside	G	Sr	North Dakota State	Stephen F. Austin	December 12, 2008	

== Against non-Division I opponents ==
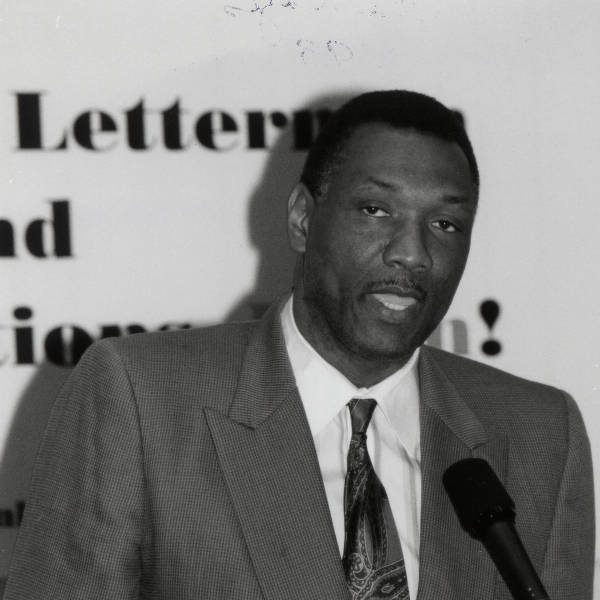
Elvin Hayes scored 62 points against Valparaiso.

Some of the opponents on this list that are currently Division I universities were not classified as Division I schools at the time the 60-point game occurred. Five of the opposing schools in this list—Morehead State, Saint Peter's, Mercer, Marshall, and Valparaiso—are present-day Division I schools.

Points	Player	Pos.	Cl.	Team	Opponent	Date	Ref.
100	Frank Selvy	G	Sr	Furman	Newberry	February 13, 1954	
85	Paul Arizin*	F/G	Jr	Villanova	Naval Air Materials Center	February 12, 1949	
81	Freeman Williams	G/F	Sr	Portland State	Rocky Mountain	February 3, 1978	
73	Bill Mlkvy	F	Jr	Temple	Wilkes	March 3, 1951	
71	Freeman Williams (2)	G/F	Jr	Portland State	Southern Oregon	February 9, 1977	
67	Darrell Floyd	G	Jr	Furman	Morehead State	February 22, 1955	
66	Freeman Williams (3)	G/F	Sr	Portland State	George Fox	January 13, 1978	
65	Bob Zawoluk	C	Sr	St. John's	Saint Peter's	March 30, 1950	
63	Frank Selvy (2)	G	Jr	Furman	Mercer	February 11, 1953	
63	Sherman White	F	Jr	LIU Brooklyn	Marshall	February 28, 1950	
62	Elvin Hayes*	C	Sr	Houston	Valparaiso	February 24, 1968	
60	Dave Jamerson	G	Sr	Ohio	Charleston (WV)	December 21, 1989	
60	Harry Kelly	F	Sr	Texas Southern	Jarvis Christian	February 23, 1983	
60	Bob Pettit*	C	Sr	LSU	Louisiana College	December 7, 1953	

== See also ==
- List of National Basketball Association players with most points in a game
- List of basketball players who have scored 100 points in a single game
