= Bob Burrow =

American basketball player (1934–2019)

Personal information
- Born: June 29, 1934 Malvern, Arkansas, U.S.
- Died: January 3, 2019 (aged 84) Franklin, Tennessee, U.S.
- Listed height: 6 ft 7 in (2.01 m)
- Listed weight: 228 lb (103 kg)

Career information
- High school: Wells (Wells, Texas)
- College: Lon Morris (1952–1954); Kentucky (1954–1956)
- NBA draft: 1956: 2nd round, 8th overall pick
- Drafted by: Rochester Royals
- Playing career: 1956–1958
- Position: Power forward / center
- Number: 6, 50

Career history
- 1956–1957: Rochester Royals
- 1957–1958: Minneapolis Lakers

Career highlights
- Consensus second-team All-American (1956); Third-team All-American – AP (1955); 2× First-team All-SEC (1955, 1956)

Career NBA statistics
- Points: 459 (5.7 ppg)
- Rebounds: 357 (4.4 rpg)
- Assists: 47 (0.6 apg)
- Stats at NBA.com
- Stats at Basketball Reference

Robert Brantley Burrow (June 29, 1934 – January 3, 2019) was an American basketball player. The son of a lumberjack, Burrow was considered the nation's No. 1 junior college player in 1954 at Lon Morris, where he scored 2,191 points.

== Early life ==
Reportedly, Adolph Rupp gave Burrow a scholarship without seeing him play in person. He played collegiately for the University of Kentucky and was selected by the Rochester Royals in the 1956 NBA draft.

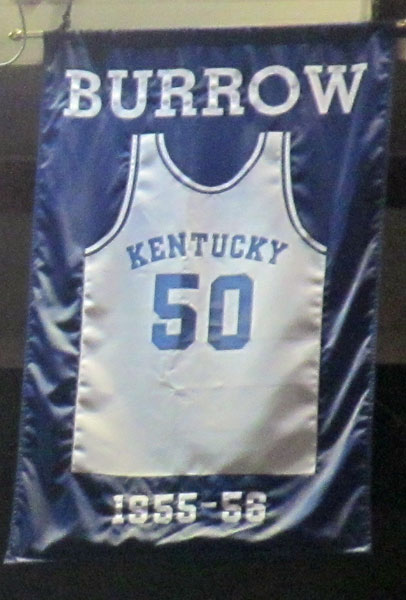
A jersey honoring Burrow hangs in Rupp Arena.

Burrow played for the Royals (1956–57) and Minneapolis Lakers (1957–58) in the NBA for a total of 81 games.

Burrow died on January 3, 2019, at age 84.

== Career statistics ==
Legend
GP	Games played	GS	Games started	MPG	Minutes per game
FG%	Field goal percentage	3P%	3-point field goal percentage	FT%	Free throw percentage
RPG	Rebounds per game	APG	Assists per game	SPG	Steals per game
BPG	Blocks per game	PPG	Points per game	**Bold**	Career high

=== NBA ===
==== Regular season ====
Year	Team	GP	MPG	FG%	FT%	RPG	APG	PPG
1956–57	Rochester	**67**	**15.3**	**.374**	**.616**	4.4	**.6**	**6.0**
1957–58	Minneapolis	14	12.2	.314	.333	**4.6**	.4	3.9
Career		81	14.8	.365	.578	4.4	.6	5.7

== See also ==
- List of NCAA Division I men's basketball players with 30 or more rebounds in a game
