= Art Bunte =

American basketball player (born 1933)

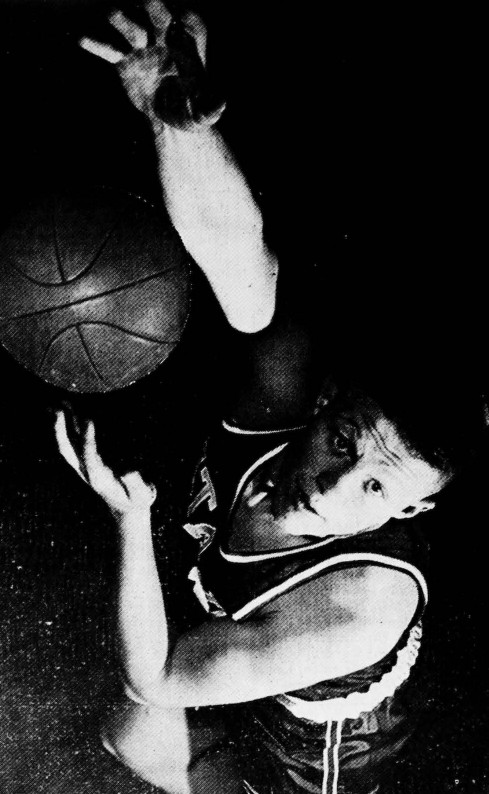

Personal information
- Born: November 16, 1933 (age 92) Denver, Colorado, U.S.
- Listed height: 6 ft 3 in (1.91 m)
- Listed weight: 215 lb (98 kg)

Career information
- High school: South (Denver, Colorado)
- College: Colorado (1951–1953); Utah (1954–1956)
- NBA draft: 1956: – round, –
- Drafted by: New York Knicks
- Position: Power forward / center

Career highlights
- Second-team All-American – INS (1955); Second-team All-American – Collier's (1956); Third-team All-American – NEA (1955); First-team All-Big Seven (1953)
- Stats at Basketball Reference

Arthur Bunte (born November 16, 1933) is an American former basketball player, best known for his All-American college career at the University of Utah.

Bunte played high school basketball at South High School in Denver, Colorado, then committed to the University of Colorado. He played two years at Colorado, but elected to transfer after his sophomore season, despite averaging 19.1 points per game and earning first-team All-Big Seven Conference honors in 1953. He then landed at Utah to play for new coach Jack Gardner. Bunte proved to be a prolific scorer for the Utes, despite being an undersized but solidly-built post player. He used deceptive quickness and a deft shooting touch to score against larger opponents. Bunte was named an All-American in 1955 after leading the Utes to the Skyline Conference title and a berth in the 1955 NCAA Tournament. He repeated the feat the following season.

Following the end of his college career, Bunte was drafted by the New York Knicks in the 1956 NBA draft. He played several years in the Amateur Athletic Union for the Denver-Chicago Truckers and the Phillips 66ers. Following his retirement from basketball, Bunte went into the trucking business until his retirement in 2000.
