= 1955–56 Michigan Wolverines men's basketball team =

American college basketball season

1955–56 Michigan Wolverines men's basketball
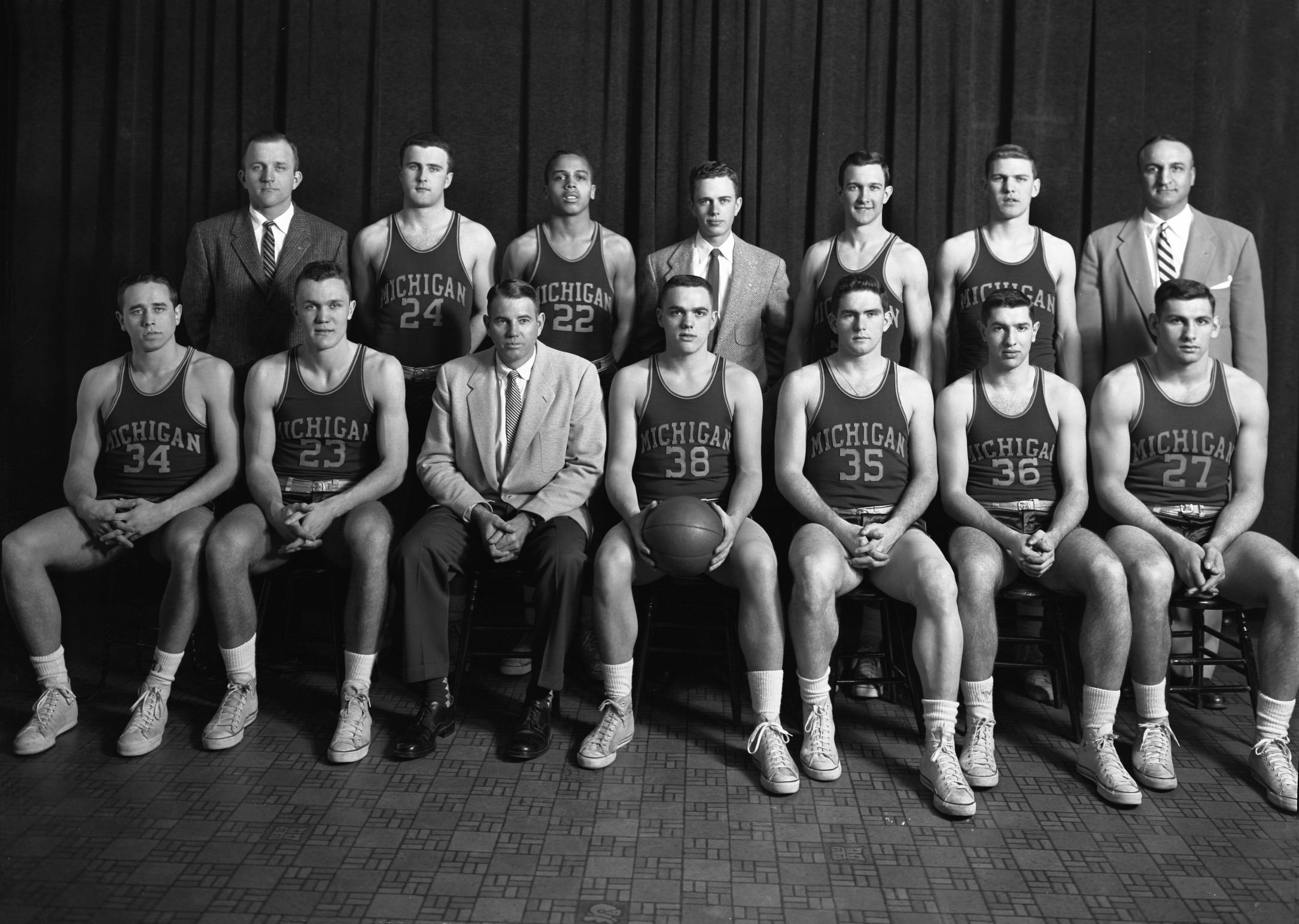
- Conference: Big Ten Conference
- Record: 9–13 (4–10 Big Ten)
- Head coach: William Perigo
- Captain: Tom Jorgensen
- Home arena: Yost Field House

1955–56 Big Ten Conference men's basketball standings
	Conf.				Overall
Team	W		L	PCT	W		L	PCT
No. 4 Iowa	13	–	1	.929	20	–	6	.769
No. 10 Illinois	11	–	3	.786	18	–	4	.818
Ohio State	9	–	5	.643	16	–	6	.727
Purdue	9	–	5	.643	16	–	6	.727
Michigan State	7	–	7	.500	13	–	9	.591
Indiana	6	–	8	.429	13	–	9	.591
Minnesota	6	–	8	.429	11	–	11	.500
Michigan	4	–	10	.286	9	–	13	.409
Wisconsin	4	–	10	.286	6	–	16	.273
Northwestern	1	–	13	.071	2	–	20	.091
Rankings from AP Poll

The 1955–56 Michigan Wolverines men's basketball team represented the University of Michigan in intercollegiate basketball during the 1955–56 season. The team finished the season in a tie for eighth place in the Big Ten Conference with an overall record of 9–13 and 4–10 against conference opponents.

William Perigo was in his fourth year as the team's head coach. Junior Ron Kramer was the team's leading scorer with 448 points in 22 games for an average of 20.3 points per game. Tom Jorgensen was the team captain.

== Statistical leaders ==
Player	Pos.	Yr	G	FG	FT	RB	Pts	PPG
Ron Kramer		Jr.	22	169-444	110-177		448	20.3
Tom Jorgensen		Sr.	22	89-239	79-92		257	11.6
Pete Tillotson			22	86-204	26-62		198	9.0
Randy Tarrier			22	63-173	55-89		181	8.2
Billy Wright			20	62-202	20-29		144	6.9
Jim Shearon			21	53-164	34-58		140	6.6
Totals			22	608-1711	394-638		1610	73.1

== Team players drafted into the NBA ==
Two players from this team were selected in the NBA draft.

Year	Round	Pick	Overall	Player	NBA Club
1957	5	2	34	Ron Kramer	Detroit Pistons
1958	7	6	53	Pete Tillotson	Syracuse Nationals
