= Bill Mlkvy =

American basketball player (1931–2024)

Personal information
- Born: January 19, 1931 Palmerton, Pennsylvania, U.S.
- Died: December 12, 2024 (aged 93) Medford, New Jersey, U.S.
- Listed height: 6 ft 4 in (1.93 m)
- Listed weight: 190 lb (86 kg)

Career information
- High school: Stephen S. Palmer (Palmerton, Pennsylvania)
- College: Temple (1949–1952)
- NBA draft: 1952: territorial pick
- Drafted by: Philadelphia Warriors
- Playing career: 1952–1953
- Position: Small forward
- Number: 16

Career history
- 1952–1953: Philadelphia Warriors

Career highlights
- Consensus first-team All-American (1951); NCAA scoring champion (1951); No. 20 retired by Temple Owls

Career NBA statistics
- Points: 181 (5.8 ppg)
- Rebounds: 101 (3.3 rpg)
- Assists: 62 (2.0 apg)
- Stats at NBA.com
- Stats at Basketball Reference

William Paul Mlkvy (January 19, 1931 – December 12, 2024) was an American professional basketball player who spent his one-year career with the Philadelphia Warriors (now the Golden State Warriors). Philadelphia selected Mlkvy with a territorial pick of the 1952 NBA draft out of Temple University.

A 6 ft 4 in (1.93 m) and 190 pounds (86 kg) forward, he was nicknamed "the Owl without a Vowel." His parents, John and Margaret, migrated to the United States in 1907 from present-day Slovakia, then part of the Austro-Hungarian Empire, when his father got a job with The New Jersey Zinc Company. Mlkvy was one of eight children.

After being drafted, Mlkvy continued with his schooling, attending Temple's dental school while playing with the Warriors. After his rookie season, Warriors general manager and coach Eddie Gottlieb made Mlkvy choose between school and basketball. Mlkvy initially chose basketball but changed course when he was informed that he would be drafted into the United States Army as a private if he was no longer enrolled in school but, if he finished school, he would be drafted as a dental officer.

Mlkvy finished dental school the following year and enlisted in the Army as a dentist and served from 1955 to 1962, eventually reaching the rank of major and was stationed in Korea for the last few years of his service.

In 1992, Mlkvy was inducted into the Pennsylvania Sports Hall of Fame. Mlkvy died in Medford, New Jersey, on December 12, 2024, at the age of 93.

== Career statistics ==
Legend
GP	Games played	GS	Games started	MPG	Minutes per game
FG%	Field goal percentage	3P%	3-point field goal percentage	FT%	Free throw percentage
RPG	Rebounds per game	APG	Assists per game	SPG	Steals per game
BPG	Blocks per game	PPG	Points per game	**Bold**	Career high

=== NBA ===
==== Regular season ====
Year	Team	GP	MPG	FG%	FT%	RPG	APG	PPG
1952–53	Philadelphia	31	19.6	.305	.646	3.3	2.0	5.8

==== College ====
*	Led NCAA Division I

Year	Team	GP	FG%	FT%	RPG	APG	PPG
1949–50	Temple	24		**.782**			16.3
1950–51	Temple	**25**	.314	.691	**18.9**	**7.0**	**29.2***
1951–52	Temple	24	**.497**	.777	15.8	5.2	17.4
Career		73	.362	.739	17.4	6.1	21.1

== See also ==
- List of NCAA Division I men's basketball players with 60 or more points in a game
- List of NCAA Division I men's basketball season scoring leaders
