= 1951 NCAA Men's Basketball All-Americans =

- Awarded for: 1950–51 NCAA men's basketball season

The consensus 1951 College Basketball All-American team, as determined by aggregating the results of five major All-American teams. To earn "consensus" status, a player must win honors from a majority of the following teams: the Associated Press, Look Magazine, The United Press International, Collier's Magazine and the International News Service.

== 1951 Consensus All-America team ==
Consensus First Team
Player	Position	Class	Team
Clyde Lovellette	C	Junior	Kansas
Gene Melchiorre	G	Senior	Bradley
Bill Mlkvy	F	Junior	Temple
Sam Ranzino	G	Senior	North Carolina State
Bill Spivey	C	Junior	Kentucky

Consensus Second Team
Player	Position	Class	Team
Ernie Barrett	G/F	Senior	Kansas State
Bill Garrett	F	Senior	Indiana
Dick Groat	G	Junior	Duke
Mel Hutchins	F/C	Senior	Brigham Young
Gale McArthur	G	Senior	Oklahoma A&M

== Individual All-America teams ==
All-America Team
All-America Team	First team		Second team		Third team	
All-America Team	Player	School	Player	School	Player	School
Associated Press	Clyde Lovellette	Kansas	Ernie Barrett	Kansas State	John Azary	Columbia
Associated Press	Gene Melchiorre	Bradley	Bill Garrett	Indiana	Mel Hutchins	Brigham Young
Associated Press	Bill Mlkvy	Temple	Dick Groat	Duke	Frank Ramsey	Kentucky
Associated Press	Sam Ranzino	North Carolina State	Gale McArthur	Oklahoma A&M	Whitey Skoog	Minnesota
Associated Press	Bill Spivey	Kentucky	Bob Zawoluk	St. John's	Mark Workman	West Virginia
UPI	Clyde Lovellette	Kansas	John Azary	Columbia	Ernie Barrett	Kansas State
UPI	Gene Melchiorre	Bradley	Bill Garrett	Indiana	Mel Hutchins	Brigham Young
UPI	Bill Mlkvy	Temple	Dick Groat	Duke	Frank Ramsey	Kentucky
UPI	Sam Ranzino	North Carolina State	Gale McArthur	Oklahoma A&M	Whitey Skoog	Minnesota
UPI	Bill Spivey	Kentucky	Bob Zawoluk	St. John's	Don Sunderlage	Illinois
Look Magazine	Mel Hutchins	Brigham Young	John Azary	Columbia	Dick Groat	Duke
Look Magazine	Gale McArthur	Oklahoma A&M	Ernie Barrett	Kansas State	Gene Melchiorre	Bradley
Look Magazine	Bill Mlkvy	Temple	Bill Garrett	Indiana	Ray Ragelis	Northwestern
Look Magazine	Sam Ranzino	North Carolina State	Clyde Lovellette	Kansas	Mark Workman	West Virginia
Look Magazine	Bill Spivey	Kentucky	Whitey Skoog	Minnesota	Bob Zawoluk	St. John's
International News Service	Ernie Barrett	Kansas State	No second or third team			
International News Service	Mel Hutchins	Brigham Young	No second or third team			
International News Service	Gene Melchiorre	Bradley	No second or third team			
International News Service	Bill Mlkvy	Temple	No second or third team			
International News Service	Bill Spivey	Kentucky	No second or third team			
Collier's	Clyde Lovellette	Kansas	John Azary	Columbia	No third team	
Collier's	Gene Melchiorre	Bradley	Bill Garrett	Indiana	No third team	
Collier's	Bill Mlkvy	Temple	Dick Groat	Duke	No third team	
Collier's	Sam Ranzino	North Carolina State	Gale McArthur	Oklahoma A&M	No third team	
Collier's	Bill Spivey	Kentucky	Whitey Skoog	Minnesota	No third team	

AP Honorable Mention:

- Ernie Beck, Pennsylvania
- Ron Bontemps, Beloit
- Frank Guisness, Washington
- Roger Johnson, Arizona
- Jack Kiley, Syracuse
- Johnny O'Brien, Seattle
- Ray Ragelis, Northwestern
- Eddie Sheldrake, UCLA
- Jim Slaughter, South Carolina
- Don Sunderlage, Illinois
- Bobby Watson, Kentucky

== See also ==
- 1950–51 NCAA men's basketball season
