= List of NCAA Division I men's basketball season scoring leaders =

In basketball, points are the sum of the score accumulated through free throws and field goals. The National Collegiate Athletic Association's (NCAA) Division I scoring title is awarded to the player with the highest points per game (ppg) average in a given season. The NCAA did not split into its current divisions format until August 1973. From 1906 to 1955, there were no classifications to the NCAA nor its predecessor, the Intercollegiate Athletic Association of the United States (IAAUS). Then, from 1956 to 1973, colleges were classified as either "NCAA University Division (Major College)" or "NCAA College Division (Small College)". The NCAA's official men's basketball media guide recognizes scoring champions beginning with the 1947–48 season; from 1935–36 to 1946–47, "unofficial" scoring champions were compiled from the annual National Basketball Committee Official Basketball Guide.

Pete Maravich of LSU holds the all-time NCAA Division I records for career scoring (3,667) and average (44.2). His three consecutive scoring titles from 1968 to 1970 are also the three highest single-season averages in NCAA history.

Nine players have earned multiple scoring titles. The most recent player to accomplish this is Reggie Williams of Virginia Military Institute (2007, 2008). There have been two occurrences where, in back-to-back seasons, two different teammates have earned the NCAA scoring title. Frank Selvy and Darrell Floyd of Furman each won in 1954 and 1955, respectively, while Hank Gathers and Bo Kimble of Loyola Marymount won in 1989 and 1990, respectively.

Many of the scoring champions from the 1986–87 season and earlier could have added significantly more points if the three-point line had been instituted. It wasn't until the 1987–88 season that the NCAA standardized the line and accounted for three-point field goals in its official record book. The only player since they were instituted to have not made a single three-point shot in his scoring title season is Gathers, who instead made 419 field goals and 177 free throws en route to scoring 1,015 points and averaging 32.7 points per game.

One prolific college basketball scorer who was not an NCAA scoring champion was Notre Dame's Austin Carr. Carr averaged 38.2 ppg as a junior in 1969–70 (tied for eighth highest in NCAA history) and 38.0 ppg as a senior in 1970–71 (tenth highest). Unfortunately for Carr, he happened to accomplish these feats while playing at the same time as Maravich, whose 44.5 ppg in 1969–70 is the highest in Division I history, and as Johnny Neumann, whose 40.1 ppg in 1970–71 is the fifth highest average. While finishing second in the scoring races each of his last two seasons, Carr is the only player on the NCAA's top ten single season scoring averages list who never won an NCAA scoring title.

== Key ==
Pos.	G	F	C	PPG	Ref.
Position	Guard	Forward	Center	Points per game	References

Class (Cl.) key
Fr	Freshman	So	Sophomore	Jr	Junior	Sr	Senior	Gr	Graduate

^	Player still competing in NCAA Division I
*	Elected to the Naismith Memorial Basketball Hall of Fame
Player (X)	Denotes the number of times the player had been the scoring leader up to and including that season

== Scoring leaders ==
Except as specifically noted, all teams are listed under their current athletic brand names, which do not always match those used by a given program in a specific season.

=== Unofficial ===
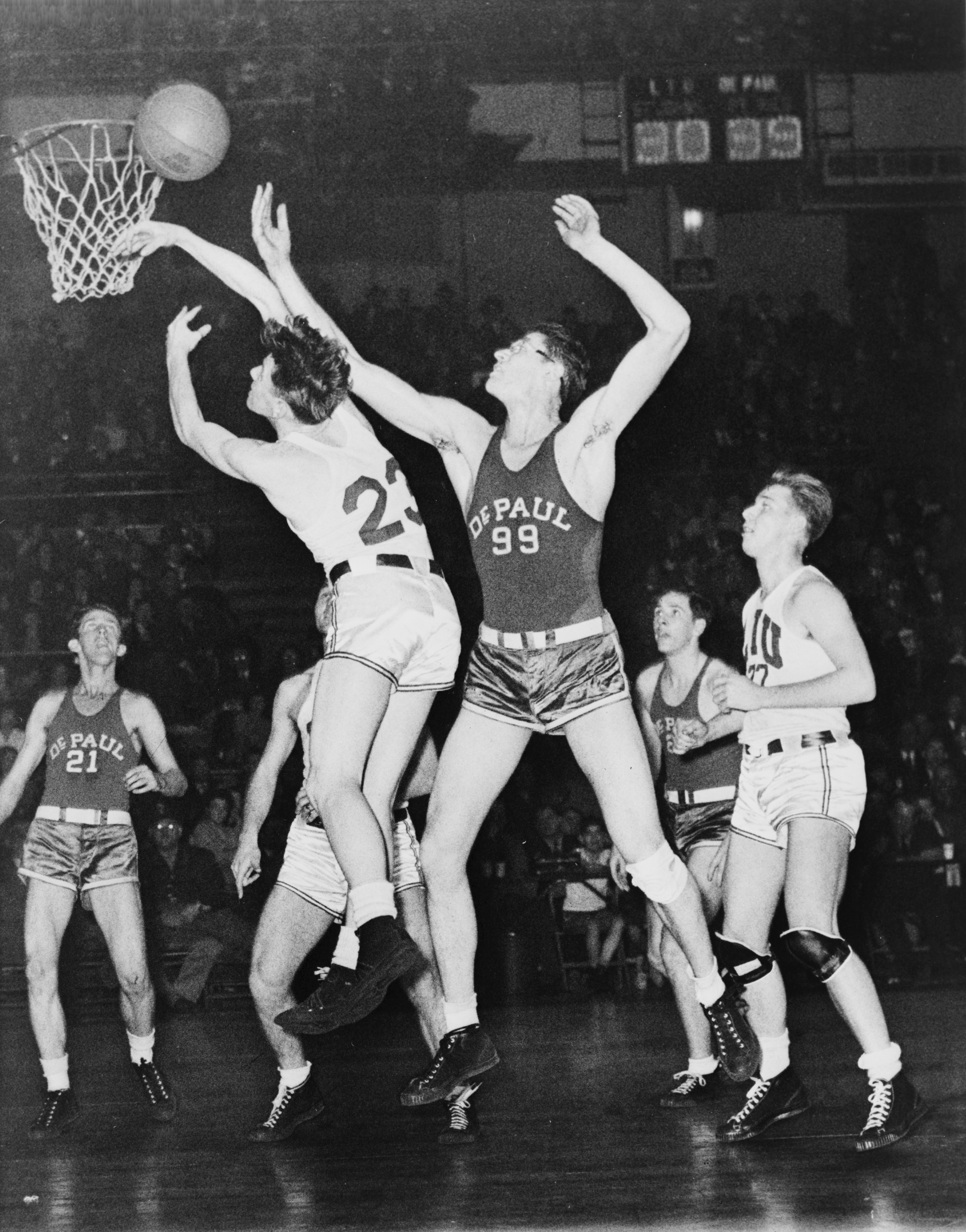
George Mikan (#99) was the first center to lead the nation in scoring, albeit unofficially.

Between 1935–36 and 1946–47, there were no "official" NCAA scoring champions. The statistics during that era were compiled from the National Basketball Committee Official Basketball Guide, which was not regulated by NCAA authorities. Therefore, the following players are included in the annual NCAA men's basketball media guide, but are listed as unofficial season scoring leaders.

Season	Player	Pos.	Cl.	Team	Games played	Field goals made	3-point field goals made	Free throws made	Total points	PPG
1935–36	Hank Luisetti*	G	So	Stanford	29	?	—	?	416	14.3
1936–37	Hank Luisetti* (2)	G	Jr	Stanford	24	?	—	?	410	17.1
1937–38	Chet Jaworski	F	Jr	Rhode Island	21	177	—	87	441	21.0
1938–39	Chet Jaworski (2)	F	Sr	Rhode Island	21	201	—	73	475	22.6
1939–40	Stan Modzelewski	G/F	So	Rhode Island	22	210	—	89	509	23.1
1940–41	Stan Modzelewski (2)	G/F	Jr	Rhode Island	25	178	—	107	463	18.5
1941–42	Stan Modzelewski (3)	G/F	Sr	Rhode Island	22	182	—	106	470	21.4
1942–43	George Senesky	G	Sr	Saint Joseph's	22	211	—	93	515	23.4
1943–44	Ernie Calverley	G	So	Rhode Island	20	226	—	82	534	26.7
1944–45	George Mikan*	C	Jr	DePaul	24	222	—	114	558	23.3
1945–46	George Mikan* (2)	C	Sr	DePaul	24	206	—	143	555	23.1
1946–47	Jim Lacy	F	So	Loyola (MD)	32	242	—	183	667	20.8

=== Official ===
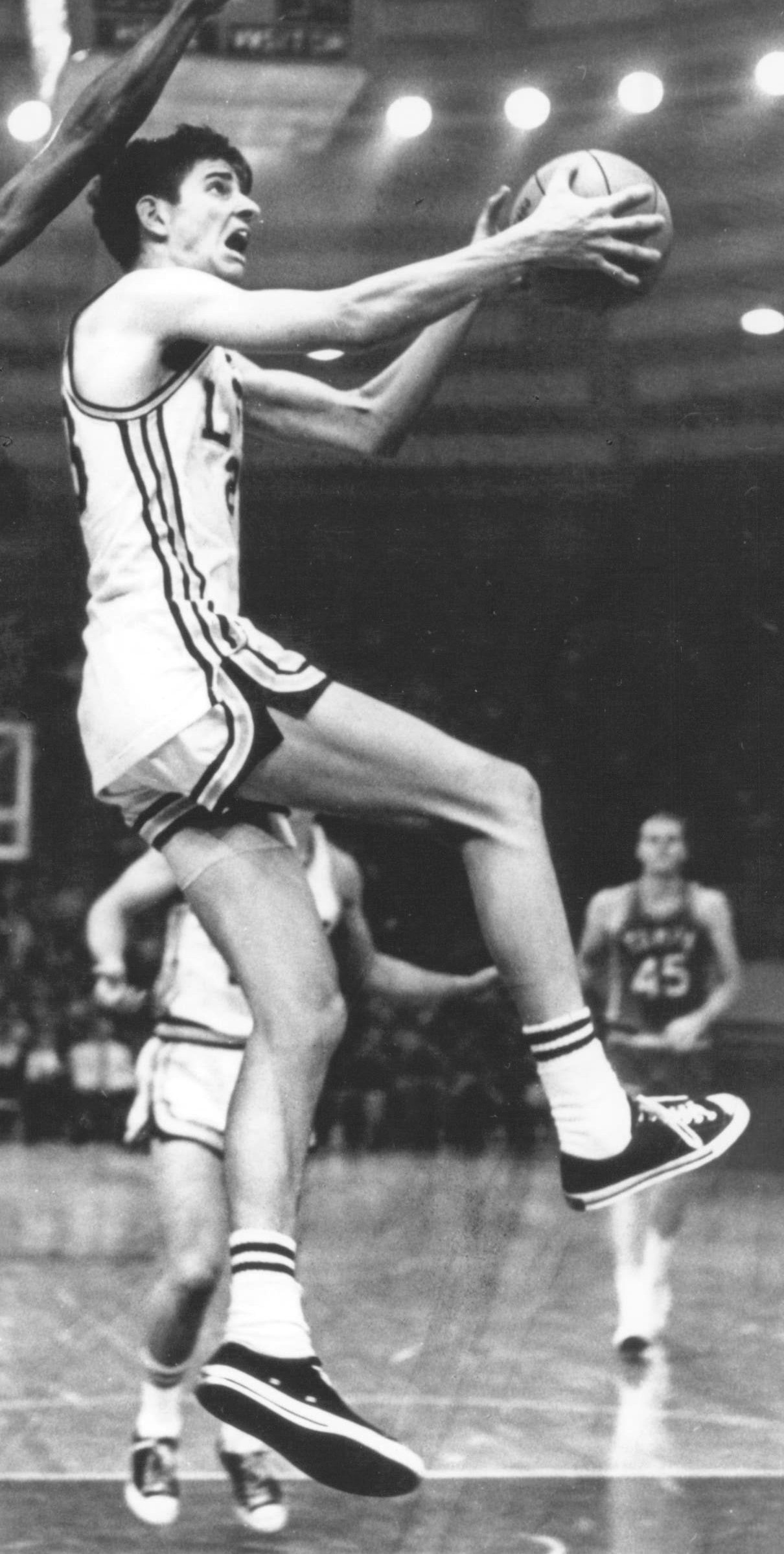
Pete Maravich averaged 44.2 points per game over three seasons for LSU

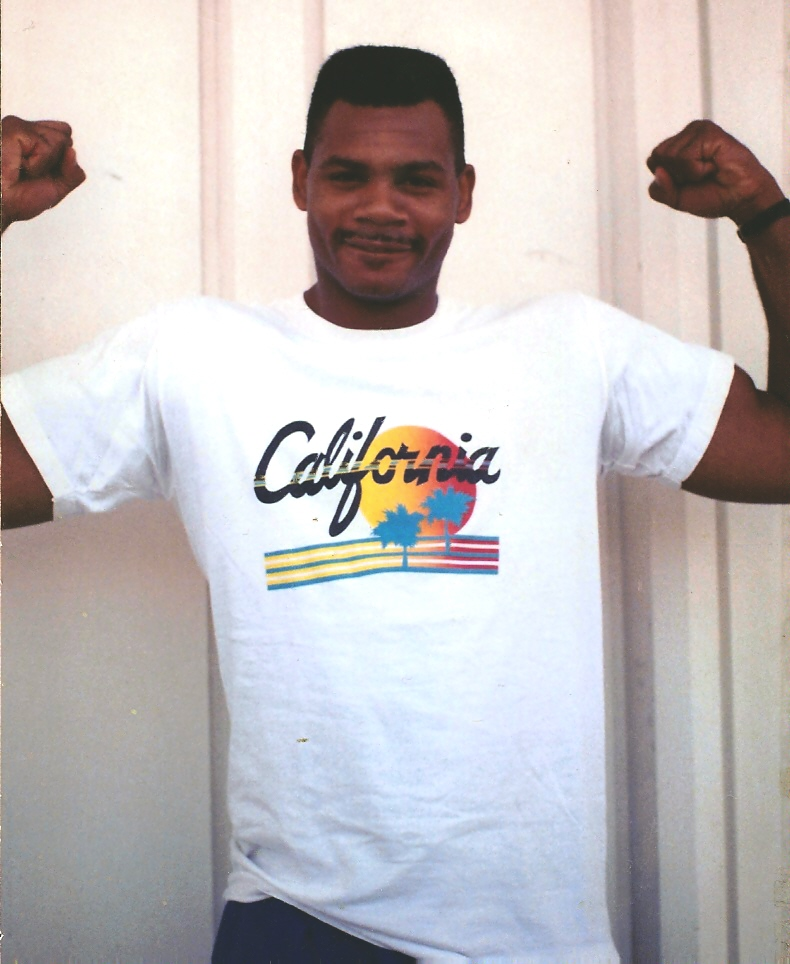
Hank Gathers led the NCAA in both scoring and rebounding in 1989.

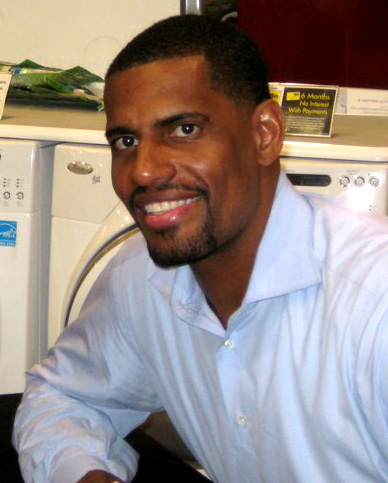
Kurt Thomas was the scoring champion in 1995.

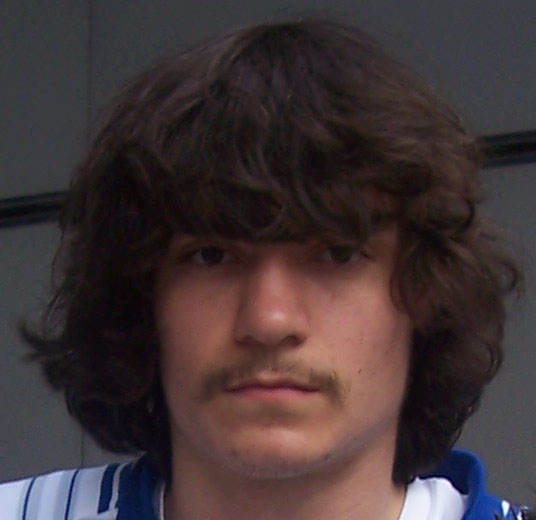
Adam Morrison edged out Duke's JJ Redick for the title in 2006.

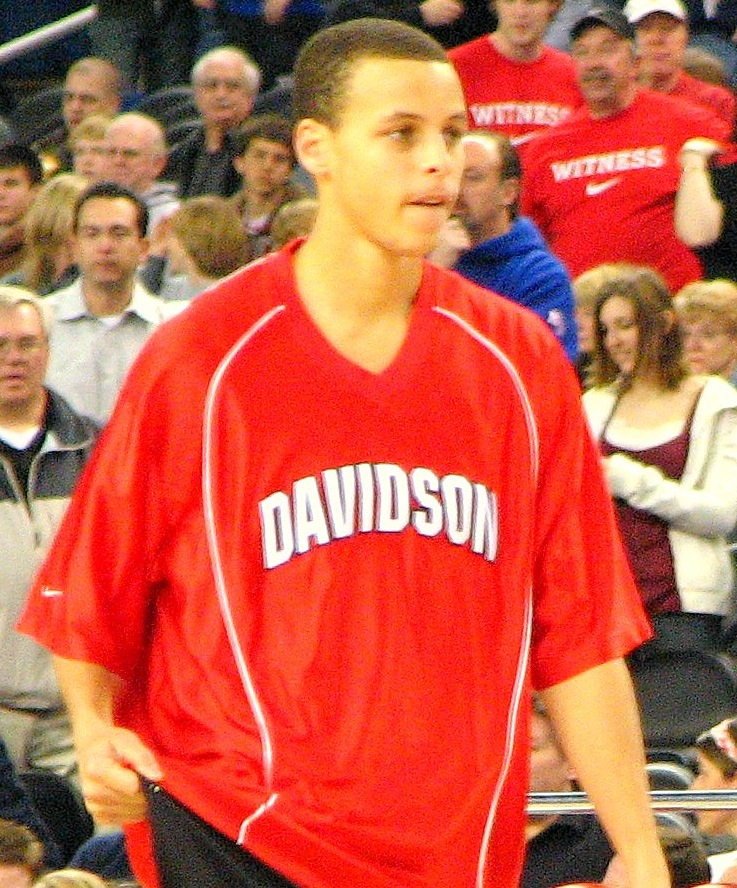
Stephen Curry won while at Davidson.

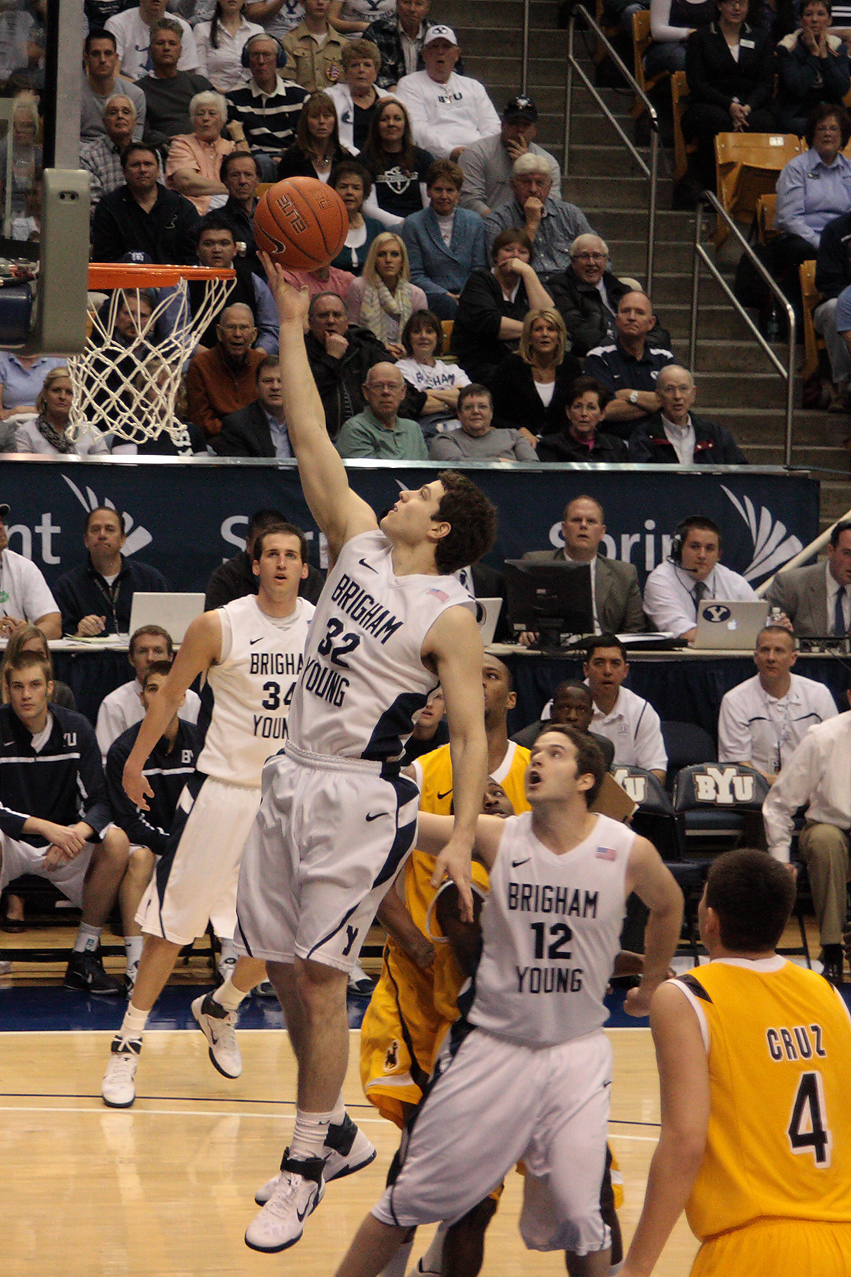
Jimmer Fredette, the 2011 scoring leader.

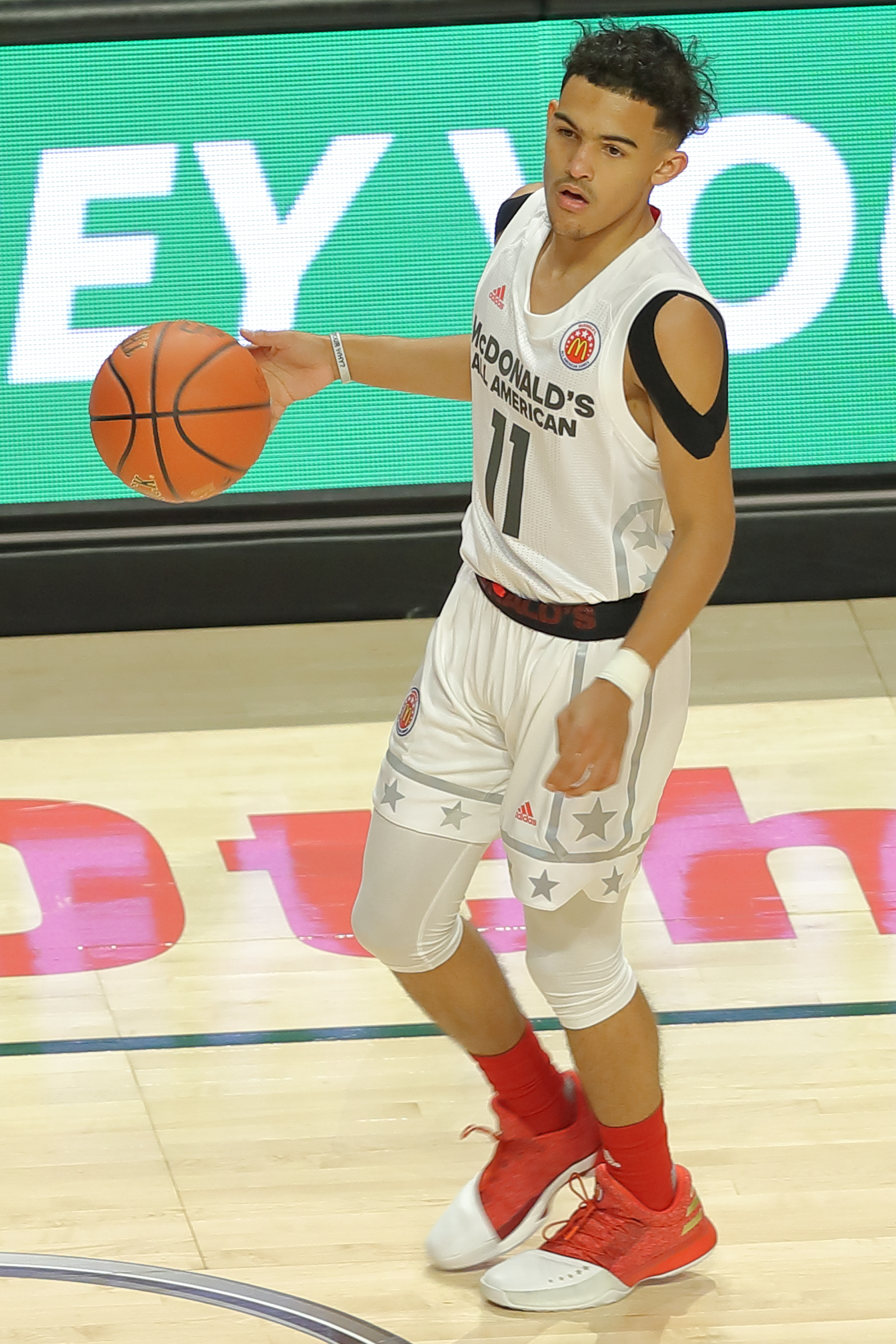
Trae Young led the nation in both points and assists during the same season in 2018.

Season	Player	Pos.	Cl.	Team	Games played	Field goals made	3-point field goals made	Free throws made	Total points	PPG	Ref.
1947–48	Murray Wier	G	Sr	Iowa	19	152	—	95	399	21.0	
1948–49	Tony Lavelli	F	Sr	Yale	30	228	—	215	671	22.4	
1949–50	Paul Arizin*	F	Sr	Villanova	29	260	—	215	735	25.3	
1950–51	Bill Mlkvy	F	Sr	Temple	25	303	—	125	731	29.2	
1951–52	Clyde Lovellette*	C	Sr	Kansas	28	352	—	182	795	28.4	
1952–53	Frank Selvy	G	Jr	Furman	25	272	—	194	738	29.5	
1953–54	Frank Selvy (2)	G	Sr	Furman	29	427	—	355	1,209	41.7	
1954–55	Darrell Floyd	G	Jr	Furman	25	344	—	209	897	35.9	
1955–56	Darrell Floyd (2)	G	Sr	Furman	28	339	—	268	946	33.8	
1956–57	Grady Wallace	F	Sr	South Carolina	29	336	—	234	906	31.2	
1957–58	Oscar Robertson*	G	So	Cincinnati	28	352	—	280	984	35.1	
1958–59	Oscar Robertson* (2)	G	Jr	Cincinnati	30	331	—	316	978	32.6	
1959–60	Oscar Robertson* (3)	G	Sr	Cincinnati	30	369	—	273	1,011	33.7	
1960–61	Frank Burgess	G	Sr	Gonzaga	26	304	—	234	842	32.4	
1961–62	Bill McGill	C/F	Sr	Utah	26	394	—	221	1,009	38.8	
1962–63	Nick Werkman	F	Jr	Seton Hall	22	221	—	208	650	29.5	
1963–64	Howie Komives	G	Sr	Bowling Green	23	292	—	260	844	36.7	
1964–65	Rick Barry*	F	Sr	Miami (Florida)	26	340	—	293	973	37.4	
1965–66	Dave Schellhase	G	Sr	Purdue	24	284	—	213	781	32.5	
1966–67	Jimmy Walker	G	Sr	Providence	28	323	—	205	851	30.4	
1967–68	Pete Maravich*	G	So	LSU	26	432	—	274	1,138	43.8	
1968–69	Pete Maravich* (2)	G	Jr	LSU	26	433	—	282	1,148	44.2	
1969–70	Pete Maravich* (3)	G	Sr	LSU	31	522	—	337	1,381	44.5	
1970–71	Johnny Neumann	F/G	So	Ole Miss	23	366	—	191	923	40.1	
1971–72	Bo Lamar	G	Jr	Louisiana	29	429	—	196	1,054	36.3	
1972–73	Bird Averitt	G	Sr	Pepperdine	25	352	—	144	848	33.9	
1973–74	Larry Fogle	G	So	Canisius	25	326	—	183	835	33.4	
1974–75	Bob McCurdy	G	Sr	Richmond	26	321	—	213	855	32.9	
1975–76	Marshall Rogers	G	Sr	Texas–Pan American (Note: Texas–Pan American ceased to exist after the 2014–15 school year, when the 2013 merger of the University of Texas–Pan American (UTPA) and the University of Texas at Brownsville, creating the current University of Texas Rio Grande Valley (UTRGV), took full effect. The UTPA athletic program, including its history, records, and memberships in Division I and the Western Athletic Conference, was fully inherited by UTRGV.)	25	361	—	197	919	36.8	
1976–77	Freeman Williams	F/G	Jr	Portland State	26	417	—	176	1,010	38.8	
1977–78	Freeman Williams (2)	F/G	Sr	Portland State	27	410	—	149	969	35.9	
1978–79	Lawrence Butler	G	Sr	Idaho State	27	310	—	192	812	30.1	
1979–80	Tony Murphy	G	Sr	Southern	29	377	—	178	932	32.1	
1980–81	Zam Fredrick	G	Sr	South Carolina	27	300	—	181	781	28.9	
1981–82	Harry Kelly	F	Jr	Texas Southern	29	336	—	190	862	29.7	
1982–83	Harry Kelly (2)	F	Sr	Texas Southern	29	333	—	169	835	28.8	
1983–84	Joe Jakubick	G	Sr	Akron	27	304	—	206	814	30.1	
1984–85	Xavier McDaniel	F/C	Sr	Wichita State	31	351	—	142	844	27.2	
1985–86	Terrance Bailey	G	Jr	Wagner	29	321	—	212	854	29.4	
1986–87	Kevin Houston	G	Sr	Army	29	311	—	268	953	32.9	
1987–88	Hersey Hawkins	G	Sr	Bradley	31	377	87	284	1,125	36.3	
1988–89	Hank Gathers	F/C	Jr	Loyola Marymount	31	419	0	177	1,015	32.7	
1989–90	Bo Kimble	G	Sr	Loyola Marymount	32	404	92	231	1,131	35.3	
1990–91	Kevin Bradshaw	G	Sr	U.S. International	28	358	60	278	1,054	37.6	
1991–92	Brett Roberts	F	Sr	Morehead State	29	278	66	193	815	28.1	
1992–93	Greg Guy	G	Jr	Texas–Pan American	19	189	67	111	556	29.3	
1993–94	Glenn Robinson	F	Jr	Purdue	34	368	79	215	1,030	30.3	
1994–95	Kurt Thomas	C	Sr	TCU	27	288	3	202	781	28.9	
1995–96	Kevin Granger	G	Sr	Texas Southern	24	194	30	230	648	27.0	
1996–97	Charles Jones	G	Jr	LIU (Note: At the time, Long Island University operated two separate athletic programs—the Division I Long Island Blackbirds (later rebranded as the "LIU Brooklyn Blackbirds"), representing the school's Brooklyn campus, and the Division II LIU Post Pioneers, representing the Post campus in Nassau County, New York. After the 2018–19 school year, the university merged its athletic programs, creating the current LIU Sharks. The Sharks inherited LIU Brooklyn's Division I and Northeast Conference memberships, as well as the history and records of all sports that the Brooklyn campus sponsored at the time of the merger.)	30	338	109	118	903	30.1	
1997–98	Charles Jones (2)	G	Sr	LIU	30	326	116	101	869	29.0	
1998–99	Alvin Young	G	Sr	Niagara	29	253	65	157	728	25.1	
1999–00	Courtney Alexander	G	Sr	Fresno State	27	252	58	107	669	24.8	
2000–01	Ronnie McCollum	G	Sr	Centenary	27	244	85	214	787	29.1	
2001–02	Jason Conley	G	Fr	VMI	28	285	79	171	820	29.3	
2002–03	Ruben Douglas	G	Sr	New Mexico	28	218	94	253	783	28.0	
2003–04	Keydren Clark	G	So	Saint Peter's	29	233	112	197	775	26.7	
2004–05	Keydren Clark (2)	G	Jr	Saint Peter's	28	230	109	152	721	25.8	
2005–06	Adam Morrison	F	Jr	Gonzaga	33	306	74	240	926	28.1	
2006–07	Reggie Williams	G	Jr	VMI	33	338	76	176	928	28.1	
2007–08	Reggie Williams (2)	G	Sr	VMI	25	269	43	114	695	27.8	
2008–09	Stephen Curry	G	Jr	Davidson	34	312	130	220	974	28.6	
2009–10	Aubrey Coleman	G	Sr	Houston	35	305	51	235	896	25.6	
2010–11	Jimmer Fredette	G	Sr	BYU	37	346	124	252	1,068	28.9	
2011–12	Reggie Hamilton	G	Sr	Oakland	36	281	118	262	942	26.2	
2012–13	Erick Green	G	Sr	Virginia Tech	32	261	61	218	801	25.0	
2013–14	Doug McDermott	F	Sr	Creighton	35	330	96	178	934	26.7	
2014–15	Tyler Harvey	G	Jr	Eastern Washington	32	230	128	150	738	23.1	
2015–16	James Daniel III	G	Jr	Howard	30	226	80	280	812	27.1	
2016–17	Marcus Keene	G	Jr	Central Michigan	32	313	125	208	959	30.0	
2017–18	Trae Young	G	Fr	Oklahoma	32	261	118	236	876	27.4	
2018–19	Chris Clemons	G	Sr	Campbell	33	304	139	246	993	30.1	
2019–20	Markus Howard	G	Sr	Marquette	29	237	121	211	806	27.8	
2020–21	Max Abmas	G	So	Oral Roberts	28	224	100	138	686	24.5	
2021–22	Peter Kiss	G	Sr	Bryant	27	246	50	138	680	25.2	
2022–23	Antoine Davis	G	Gr	Detroit Mercy	33	303	159	165	930	28.2	
2023–24	Zach Edey	C	Sr	Purdue	39	336	1	310	983	25.2	
2024–25	Eric Dixon	F	Gr	Villanova	35	269	103	174	815	23.3	
2025–26	AJ Dybantsa	F	Fr	BYU	35	308	49	229	894	25.5	

== Multiple-time leaders ==
Rank	Player	Team	Times leader	Years
1	Stan Modzelewski	Rhode Island	3	1939–40, 1940–41, 1941–42
1	Pete Maravich	LSU	3	1967–68, 1968–69, 1969–70
1	Oscar Robertson	Cincinnati	3	1957–58, 1958–59, 1959–60
4	Chet Jaworski	Rhode Island	2	1937–38, 1938–39
4	Hank Luisetti	Stanford	2	1935–36, 1936–37
4	George Mikan	DePaul	2	1944–45, 1945–46
4	Keydren Clark	Saint Peter's	2	2003–04, 2004–05
4	Darrell Floyd	Furman	2	1954–55, 1955–56
4	Charles Jones	LIU	2	1996–97, 1997–98
4	Harry Kelly	Texas Southern	2	1981–82, 1982–83
4	Frank Selvy	Furman	2	1952–53, 1953–54
4	Freeman Williams	Portland State	2	1976–77, 1977–78
4	Reggie Williams	VMI	2	2006–07, 2007–08
