= Bill Ridley =

American basketball player (1934–2019)

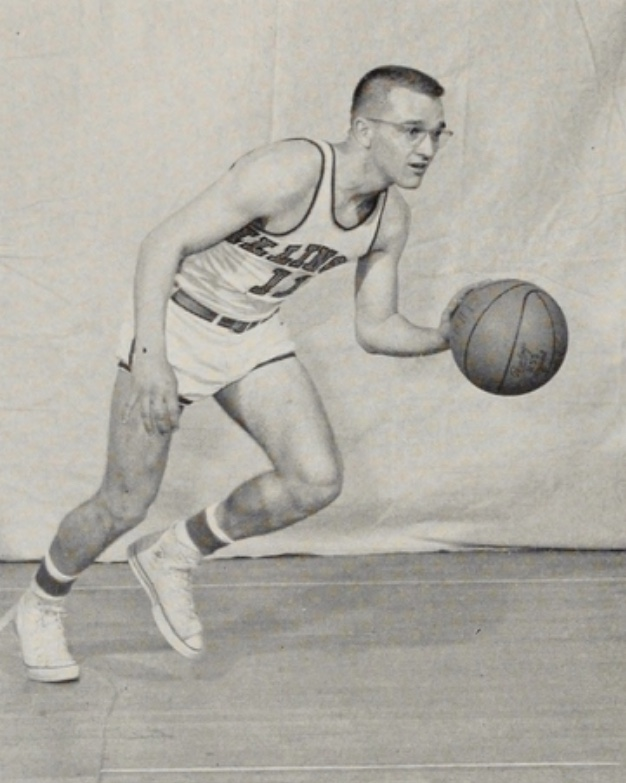
- Ridley as a senior at Illinois.

Personal information
- Born: February 2, 1934 Taylorville, Illinois, U.S.
- Died: September 28, 2019 (aged 91) Frostproof, Florida, U.S.
- Listed height: 5 ft 9 in (1.75 m)

Career information
- High school: Taylorville (Taylorville, Illinois)
- College: Illinois (1953–1956)
- NBA draft: 1956: undrafted
- Position: Point guard

Career highlights
- Third-team All-American – AP, UPI (1956); First-team All-Big Ten (1956); Third-team All-Big Ten (1955)

William D. Ridley (February 2, 1934 – September 28, 2019) was an American college basketball player. He was an All-American and All-Big Ten player for the Illinois Fighting Illini.

Ridley, a diminutive but quick 5 ft 9 in (1.75 m) point guard, went to Taylorville High School in Taylorville, Illinois While there, he was a unanimous all-state performer as a senior in 1952. He chose to play for coach Harry Combes at Illinois as a part of a strong recruiting class that also included in-state players Bruce Brothers and twins Phil and Paul Judson. After sitting out what would have been his freshman season per NCAA eligibility rules of the time, Ridley joined the varsity team for the 1953–54 season, averaging 6.0 points per game in a supporting role. He moved into the starting lineup in his sophomore season, raising his scoring average to 15.2 points per game and was named third-team All-Big Ten Conference by the United Press International (UPI), who also named him to their national "Small-America" team of the top players under 5 ft 10 in (1.78 m).

In Ridley's senior season, the Illini started a potent scoring lineup with Brother, Paul Judson and George Bon Salle in the frontcourt with Ridley running the attack from the perimeter. Ridley led the team's fast break, using his speed and ballhandling to push the ball ahead off of the team's strong rebounding ability. Ridley finished the year averaging 15.3 points per game and at the close of the season was named All-Big Ten and as a third-team All-American by both the Associated Press (AP) and UPI.

Following the close of his college career, Ridley's size made a National Basketball Association career difficult. He was not drafted in the 1956 NBA draft and instead went into the insurance and asset management business. He died on September 28, 2019, in his post-retirement home of Frostproof, Florida.
