= Wally Choice =

American basketball player

Personal information
- Born: August 13, 1932 Montclair, New Jersey, U.S.
- Died: September 9, 2018 (aged 86) Montclair, New Jersey, U.S.
- Listed height: 6 ft 4 in (1.93 m)
- Listed weight: 195 lb (88 kg)

Career information
- High school: Montclair (Montclair, New Jersey)
- College: Indiana (1953–1956)
- NBA draft: 1956: 11th round, 78th overall pick
- Drafted by: St. Louis Hawks
- Position: Forward

Career history
- 1957–1964: Easton Madisons / Trenton Colonials

Career highlights
- EPBL champion (1960); All-EPBL First Team (1962); 4× All-EPBL Second Team (1958–1960, 1963)
- Stats at Basketball Reference

Wallace Choice Jr. (August 13, 1932 – September 9, 2018) was an American professional basketball player. He played college basketball for the Indiana Hoosiers. Choice played professionally with the Harlem Globetrotters and in the Eastern Professional Basketball League. After his retirement from playing, he became a prominent community activist in his hometown of Montclair, New Jersey.

== Playing career ==
Choice was born in Montclair, New Jersey, and graduated from Montclair High School in 1952. He played college basketball for the Indiana Hoosiers and was the second African-American to play in the Big Ten Conference. Choice was appointed as team captain and became the first African-American to hold the role for a Big Ten team.

Choice played for the Harlem Globetrotters and in the Eastern Professional Basketball League (EPBL). He played for the Easton Madisons / Trenton Colonials with whom he won an EPBL championship in 1960 and was a five-time selection to the All-EPBL Team. Choice led the EPBL in scoring twice: 1,033 points during the 1961–62 season and 956 during the 1962–63 season. His 41.3 points per game during the 1961–62 season were a league record.

== Later life ==
Choice returned to Montclair where he became a real estate developer and owned retail outlets. He was a founding member of Montclair Grass Roots in 1968 which hosted summer camps. Choice was a community activist and nicknamed as a "godfather" of the Montclair community. Montclair Grass Roots led upgrades at Glenfield Park which renamed its Glenfield Park House to the Wally Choice Community Center in 2009.

== Personal life ==
Choice met his wife at Indiana University. He had a son.

== Death ==
Choice died aged 85 at the Mountainside Medical Center on September 9, 2018, after a short illness.
