= Darrell Floyd =

American basketball player (1932–2000)

Personal information
- Born: May 11, 1932 Thomasville, North Carolina, U.S.
- Died: March 7, 2000 (aged 67) Greenville, South Carolina, U.S.
- Listed height: 6 ft 1 in (1.85 m)

Career information
- High school: Fair Grove (Thomasville, North Carolina)
- College: Wingate (1952–1953); Furman (1953–1956)
- NBA draft: 1956: 3rd round, 17th overall pick
- Drafted by: St. Louis Hawks
- Position: Guard
- Number: 33

Career highlights
- 2× Consensus second-team All-American (1955, 1956); 2× NCAA scoring champion (1955, 1956); 2× SoCon Player of the Year (1955, 1956); 2× First-team All-SoCon (1955, 1956); No. 33 retired by Furman Paladins
- Stats at Basketball Reference

Darrell Floyd (May 11, 1932 – March 7, 2000) was an American college basketball All-American while playing for Furman University in Greenville, South Carolina from 1953 to 1956. He was a two-time national scoring champion, two-time Consensus NCAA Division I All-America Second Team selection, two-time South Carolina Player of the Year and two-time Southern Conference Player of the Year. Floyd was just the second player to repeat as NCAA scoring champion. The first was Frank Selvy who also played for Furman with Floyd for one season (1953–54) and won consecutive scoring titles in 1953 and 1954.

== College career ==
Darrell Floyd began his college career in 1950–51 at Wingate (N.C.) Junior College, where in his only season there he was named a Junior College All-American. From there he transferred to Furman University where he played for three years.

As a junior in 1954–55, Floyd led the nation in scoring while averaging 35.9 points per game. On January 2, 1955, he scored 67 points in a win over Morehead State, which stands as the ninth-highest single-game scoring total in NCAA history. Also in his junior season he scored 56 points against Clemson, which is still the highest opponent total against the Tigers. Floyd was named to the Consensus All-America Second Team in 1955.

In 1955–56, Floyd repeated as the national scoring leader by averaging 33.8 points. By the time his Furman career had ended he owned a 32.1 points per game scoring average, which is the eighth-highest in NCAA history and ahead of other college greats like Elgin Baylor and Larry Bird. In 71 career games, the 6-foot-1-inch (1.85 m) guard scored 2,281 points and topped 40 points in a game on 15 occasions.

When Floyd played college basketball the game's rules were different from the present. The three-point shot had yet to be created and implemented, a common foul only allowed for one point on free throws, and the "one-and-one" rule meant that the free throw shooter did not get the ball back if he made his first attempt. Given that Floyd was a small guard, one may reasonably infer that the majority of his shots were from at least a mid-range distance. Additionally, as a 78.3% free throw shooter, his scoring averages would have been higher if players had been rewarded with bonus free throw opportunities as they are under the game's current rules.

== Post-college ==
After graduating in 1956 with a bachelor's degree in health and physical education, Floyd spent two years serving in the United States Army. Although he had been drafted by the St. Louis Hawks of the National Basketball Association (NBA), the league was in its fledgling state and could not offer more money than his job selling heavy machinery was paying. When the Hawks and Floyd could not agree on a contract price, the Hawks traded his rights to the Cincinnati Royals, but nothing ever came of it. Floyd holds the rare distinction of being a two-time NCAA scoring champion who never played a single game of professional basketball anywhere.

In his later life, Floyd became an entrepreneur, businessman and basketball coach for a girls' church league team. He married Kay Harling, and they had three daughters—Diane, Nancy and Libby.

== See also ==
- List of NCAA Division I men's basketball players with 60 or more points in a game
- List of NCAA Division I men's basketball season scoring leaders
