= 1955–56 Wisconsin Badgers men's basketball team =

American college basketball season

1955–56 Wisconsin Badgers men's basketball
- Conference: Big Ten Conference
- Record: 6–16 (4–10 Big Ten)
- Head coach: Harold E. Foster
- Home arena: UW Fieldhouse

1955–56 Big Ten Conference men's basketball standings
	Conf.				Overall
Team	W		L	PCT	W		L	PCT
No. 4 Iowa	13	–	1	.929	20	–	6	.769
No. 10 Illinois	11	–	3	.786	18	–	4	.818
Ohio State	9	–	5	.643	16	–	6	.727
Purdue	9	–	5	.643	16	–	6	.727
Michigan State	7	–	7	.500	13	–	9	.591
Indiana	6	–	8	.429	13	–	9	.591
Minnesota	6	–	8	.429	11	–	11	.500
Michigan	4	–	10	.286	9	–	13	.409
Wisconsin	4	–	10	.286	6	–	16	.273
Northwestern	1	–	13	.071	2	–	20	.091
Rankings from AP Poll

The 1955–56 Wisconsin Badgers men's basketball team represented University of Wisconsin–Madison. The head coach was Harold E. Foster, coaching his twenty-second season with the Badgers. The team played their home games at the UW Fieldhouse in Madison, Wisconsin and was a member of the Big Ten Conference.

== Schedule ==
Date time, TV	Rank^{#}	Opponent^{#}	Result	Record	Site city, state
Regular Season
12/01/1955*		Butler	L 63–67	0–1	UW Fieldhouse; Madison, Wisconsin
12/05/1955*		at Notre Dame	W 70–66	1–1	Notre Dame Fieldhouse; Notre Dame, Indiana
12/10/1955*		Kansas	L 66–74	1–2	UW Fieldhouse; Madison, Wisconsin
12/12/1955*		Southern Methodist	L 62–75	1–3	UW Fieldhouse; Madison, Wisconsin
12/19/1955*		Nebraska	W 71–52	2–3	UW Fieldhouse; Madison, Wisconsin
12/28/1955*		at Washington	L 53–54	2–4	Hec Edmundson Pavilion; Seattle, WA
12/29/1955*		at California	L 55–62	2–5	Men's Gym; Berkeley, California
12/30/1955*		at Stanford	L 53–65	2–6	Stanford Pavilion; Stanford, California
1/02/1956		Purdue	L 66–78	2–7 (0–1)	UW Fieldhouse; Madison, Wisconsin
1/07/1956		No. 13 Indiana	L 71–75	2–8 (0–2)	UW Fieldhouse; Madison, Wisconsin
1/09/1956		at No. 8 Illinois	L 77–96	2–9 (0–3)	Huff Hall; Champaign, Illinois
1/14/1956		at No. 7 Ohio State	L 98–100 ^{2OT}	2–10 (0–4)	Ohio Expo Center Coliseum; Columbus, Ohio
1/16/1956		Michigan	W 69–58	3–10 (1–4)	UW Fieldhouse; Madison, Wisconsin
2/04/1956		at Northwestern	W 79–55	4–10 (2–4)	Welsh-Ryan Arena; Evanston, Illinois
2/06/1956		No. 19 Iowa	L 74–78	4–11 (2–5)	UW Fieldhouse; Madison, Wisconsin
2/11/1956		Minnesota	L 71–77	4–12 (2–6)	UW Fieldhouse; Madison, Wisconsin
2/13/1956		at Indiana	W 69–67	5–12 (3–6)	The Fieldhouse; Bloomington, Indiana
2/18/1956		at No. 15 Iowa	L 66–80	5–13 (3–7)	Iowa Field House; Iowa City, IA
2/20/1956		Ohio State	L 71–79	5–14 (3–8)	UW Fieldhouse; Madison, Wisconsin
2/25/1956		at Michigan	L 68–78	5–15 (3–9)	Yost Field House; Ann Arbor, Michigan
2/27/1956		at Michigan State	L 82–89	5–16 (3–10)	Jenison Fieldhouse; East Lansing, Michigan
3/03/1956		Northwestern	W 76–70	6–16 (4–10)	UW Fieldhouse; Madison, Wisconsin
*Non-conference game. ^{#}Rankings from AP Poll. (#) Tournament seedings in parentheses.
