= Tom Jorgensen =

American basketball player and coach

Tom Jorgenson
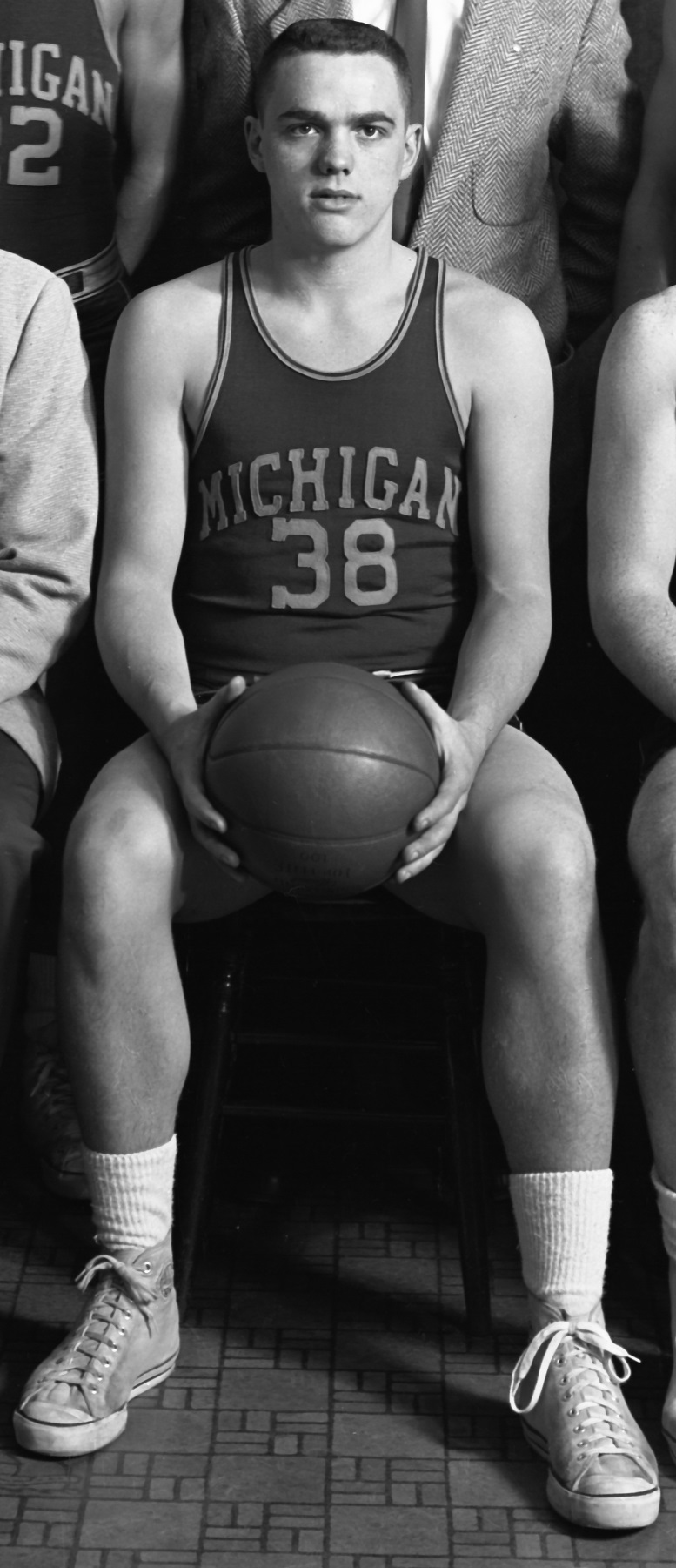
- Jorgensen from 1956 Michigan team portrait

Biographical details
- Born: January 2, 1935; Illinois, United States
- Died: November 29, 2013 (aged 78)

Playing career
- 1953–1956: Michigan

Coaching career (HC unless noted)
- 1960–1966: Michigan (asst.)
- 1966–1973: Northern Illinois

Accomplishments and honors

Championships
- 1 Midwestern regular season (1972)

Awards
- Midwestern Coach of the Year (1972)

Thomas A. Jorgensen, Jr.(January 2, 1935 – November 29, 2013) was an American basketball coach and player. He was the head coach of the Northern Illinois Huskies men's basketball from 1966 to 1973, compiling a record of 95–61 (.609). He played college basketball at the University of Michigan from 1953 to 1956. He was also an assistant basketball coach at Michigan from 1960 to 1966.

== Early years ==
Jorgensen attended Parker High School in the Chicago's Englewood neighborhood.

== University of Michigan ==
Jorgensen played college basketball at the University of Michigan from 1953 to 1956. He was the team's second leading scorer for three consecutive years. He had a career total of 862 points for the Wolverines. He was also selected as the captain of the 1955–56 Michigan Wolverines men's basketball team. In 1955, The Michigan Daily wrote of Jorgensen: "His deadly outside set shot and excellent dribbling ability made him one of the Big Ten's best all-around ballplayers."

== Coaching and scouting career ==
After graduating from Michigan, Jorgensen became a basketball coach at Maumee High School near Toledo, Ohio. He also played in the Toledo Amateur Basketball Federation where he was the high scorer in 1957.

Jorgensen was hired in 1960 as an assistant basketball coach under Dave Strack at Michigan. He remained in that position through 1966.

In 1966, Jorgensen was hired as the head coach of the Northern Illinois Huskies men's basketball team. He remained there for seven seasons. He compiled a record of 95–61 (.609) at Northern Illinois and led the team to the 1972 Midwestern Conference championship. Jorgensen's 1971–72 team defeated No. 5-ranked Indiana (85–71) and was ranked No. 18 in the Associated Press poll. Jorgensen resigned as the head coach at Northern Illinois in March 1973. Jorgensen was inducted into the NIU Athletics Hall of Fame in 1998.

In February 1975, Joregensen was hired as the supervisor of basketball officials for the Western Athletic Conference.

In 1988, Jorgensen was hired as the chief scout for the Charlotte Hornets.

== Head coaching record ==
Record table
Season	Team	Overall	Conference	Standing	Postseason
Northern Illinois Huskies (NCAA University Division Independent) (1966–1970)
1966–67	Northern Illinois	8–12			
1967–68	Northern Illinois	10–14			
1968–69	Northern Illinois	13–11			
1969–70	Northern Illinois	13–12			
Northern Illinois Huskies (Midwestern Conference) (1970–1972)
1970–71	Northern Illinois	13–10	4–4	3rd	
1971–72	Northern Illinois	21–4	7–1	1st	
Northern Illinois Huskies (NCAA University Division Independent) (1972–1973)
1972–73	Northern Illinois	17–8			
Northern Illinois:		82–49 (.626)	11–5 (.688)		
Total:		95–61 (.609)			
National champion Postseason invitational champion Conference regular season champion Conference regular season and conference tournament champion Division regular season champion Division regular season and conference tournament champion Conference tournament champion
