= 1956 NCAA Men's Basketball All-Americans =

- Awarded for: 1955–56 NCAA men's basketball season

The consensus 1956 College Basketball All-American team, as determined by aggregating the results of six major All-American teams. To earn "consensus" status, a player must win honors from a majority of the following teams: the Associated Press, Look Magazine, The United Press International, the Newspaper Enterprise Association (NEA), Collier's Magazine and the International News Service.

== 1956 Consensus All-America team ==
Consensus First Team
Player	Position	Class	Team
Robin Freeman	G	Senior	Ohio State
Sihugo Green	G	Senior	Duquesne
Tom Heinsohn	F	Senior	Holy Cross
Bill Russell	C	Senior	San Francisco
Ronnie Shavlik	F/C	Senior	North Carolina State

Consensus Second Team
Player	Position	Class	Team
Bob Burrow	F	Senior	Kentucky
Darrell Floyd	G	Senior	Furman
Rod Hundley	G/F	Junior	West Virginia
K.C. Jones	G	Senior	San Francisco
Willie Naulls	F	Senior	UCLA
Bill Uhl	C	Senior	Dayton

== Individual All-America teams ==
All-America Team
All-America Team	First team		Second team		Third team	
All-America Team	Player	School	Player	School	Player	School
Associated Press	Darrell Floyd	Furman	Rod Hundley	West Virginia	Bob Burrow	Kentucky
Associated Press	Robin Freeman	Ohio State	K. C. Jones	San Francisco	Joe Holup	George Washington
Associated Press	Sihugo Green	Duquesne	Lennie Rosenbluth	North Carolina	Julius McCoy	Michigan State
Associated Press	Tom Heinsohn	Holy Cross	Ronnie Shavlik	North Carolina State	Willie Naulls	UCLA
Associated Press	Bill Russell	San Francisco	Bill Uhl	Dayton	Bill Ridley	Illinois
UPI	Darrell Floyd	Furman	Tom Heinsohn	Holy Cross	Bob Burrow	Kentucky
UPI	Robin Freeman	Ohio State	Rod Hundley	West Virginia	Paul Judson	Illinois
UPI	Sihugo Green	Duquesne	Lennie Rosenbluth	North Carolina	Julius McCoy	Michigan State
UPI	K. C. Jones	San Francisco	Ronnie Shavlik	North Carolina State	Willie Naulls	UCLA
UPI	Bill Russell	San Francisco	Bill Uhl	Dayton	Bill Ridley	Illinois
Look Magazine	Bob Burrow	Kentucky	No second or third teams (10-man first team)			
Look Magazine	Robin Freeman	Ohio State	No second or third teams (10-man first team)			
Look Magazine	Sihugo Green	Duquesne	No second or third teams (10-man first team)			
Look Magazine	Tom Heinsohn	Holy Cross	No second or third teams (10-man first team)			
Look Magazine	Joe Holup	George Washington	No second or third teams (10-man first team)			
Look Magazine	K. C. Jones	San Francisco	No second or third teams (10-man first team)			
Look Magazine	Willie Naulls	UCLA	No second or third teams (10-man first team)			
Look Magazine	Bill Russell	San Francisco	No second or third teams (10-man first team)			
Look Magazine	Ronnie Shavlik	North Carolina State	No second or third teams (10-man first team)			
Look Magazine	Bill Uhl	Dayton	No second or third teams (10-man first team)			
NEA	Robin Freeman	Ohio State	Bob Burrow	Kentucky	Joe Capua	Wyoming
NEA	Sihugo Green	Duquesne	Rod Hundley	West Virginia	Joe Holup	George Washington
NEA	Tom Heinsohn	Holy Cross	K. C. Jones	San Francisco	Paul Judson	Illinois
NEA	Bill Russell	San Francisco	Willie Naulls	UCLA	Lennie Rosenbluth	North Carolina
NEA	Ronnie Shavlik	North Carolina State	Bill Uhl	Dayton	Temple Tucker	Rice
International News Service	Robin Freeman	Ohio State	Rod Hundley	West Virginia	No third team	
International News Service	Sihugo Green	Duquesne	K. C. Jones	San Francisco	No third team	
International News Service	Tom Heinsohn	Holy Cross	Willie Naulls	UCLA	No third team	
International News Service	Bill Russell	San Francisco	Lennie Rosenbluth	North Carolina	No third team	
International News Service	Ronnie Shavlik	North Carolina State	Bill Uhl	Dayton	No third team	
Collier's	Robin Freeman	Ohio State	Art Bunte	Utah	Joe Holup	George Washington
Collier's	Sihugo Green	Duquesne	Bob Burrow	Kentucky	Rod Hundley	West Virginia
Collier's	K. C. Jones	San Francisco	Darrell Floyd	Furman	Hal Lear	Temple
Collier's	Bill Russell	San Francisco	Tom Heinsohn	Holy Cross	Willie Naulls	UCLA
Collier's	Ronnie Shavlik	North Carolina State	Bill Uhl	Dayton	Lennie Rosenbluth	North Carolina

AP Honorable Mention:

- Don Boldebuck, Houston
- Joe Belmont, Duke
- Jerry Bird, Kentucky
- Art Bunte, Utah
- Carl Cain, Iowa
- Joe Capua, Wyoming
- Jerry Harper, Alabama
- Paul Judson, Illinois
- Jim Krebs, Southern Methodist
- Hal Lear, Temple
- Bill Logan, Iowa
- Johnny McCarthy, Canisius
- Jim McLaughlin, Saint Louis
- Vic Molodet, North Carolina State
- Jim Paxson, Dayton
- Terry Rand, Marquette
- George Selleck, Stanford
- Morris Taft, UCLA
- Terry Tebbs, Brigham Young
- Gary Thompson, Iowa State
- Charlie Tyra, Louisville

== See also ==
- 1955–56 NCAA men's basketball season
