= List of Houston Cougars men's basketball seasons =

This is a list of seasons completed by the Houston Cougars men's basketball team.

== Seasons ==
Statistics overview
Season	Coach	Overall	Conference	Standing	Postseason
Alden Pasche (Lone Star Conference) (1945–1949)
1945–46	Alden Pasche	10–4	8–2	1st	NAIA second round
1946–47	Alden Pasche	15–7	11–1	1st	NAIA second round
1947–48	Alden Pasche	11–11	6–6		
1948–49	Alden Pasche	11–11	7–5		
Alden Pasche (Gulf Coast Conference) (1949–1950)
1949–50	Alden Pasche	16–7	6–0	1st	
Alden Pasche (Missouri Valley Conference) (1950–1956)
1950–51	Alden Pasche	11–17	2–12	8th	
1951–52	Alden Pasche	7–14	3–7	5th	
1952–53	Alden Pasche	9–13	5–5	T–2nd	
1953–54	Alden Pasche	11–15	3–7	5th	
1954–55	Alden Pasche	15–10	3–7	5th	
1955–56	Alden Pasche	19–7	9–3	1st	NCAA Sweet Sixteen
Guy Lewis (Missouri Valley Conference) (1956–1960)
1956–57	Guy Lewis	10–16	5–9	T–5th	
1957–58	Guy Lewis	9–16	4–10	T–6th	
1958–59	Guy Lewis	12–14	6–8	5th	
1959–60	Guy Lewis	13–12	6–8	T–4th	
Guy Lewis (Independent) (1960–1975)
1960–61	Guy Lewis	17–11			NCAA University Division Sweet Sixteen
1961–62	Guy Lewis	21–6			NIT Quarterfinals
1962–63	Guy Lewis	15–11			
1963–64	Guy Lewis	16–10			
1964–65	Guy Lewis	19–10			NCAA University Division Sweet Sixteen
1965–66	Guy Lewis	23–6			NCAA University Division Sweet Sixteen
1966–67	Guy Lewis	27–4			NCAA University Division Final Four
1967–68	Guy Lewis	31–2			NCAA University Division Final Four
1968–69	Guy Lewis	16–10			
1969–70	Guy Lewis	25–5			NCAA University Division Sweet Sixteen
1970–71	Guy Lewis	22–7			NCAA University Division Sweet Sixteen
1971–72	Guy Lewis	20–7			NCAA University Division first round
1972–73	Guy Lewis	23–4			NCAA University Division first round
1973–74	Guy Lewis	17–9			
1974–75	Guy Lewis	16–10			
Guy Lewis (Southwest Conference) (1975–1986)
1975–76	Guy Lewis	17–11	7–9	6th	
1976–77	Guy Lewis	29–8	13–3	2nd	NIT Runner-up
1977–78	Guy Lewis	25–8	11–5	3rd	NCAA Division I first round
1978–79	Guy Lewis	16–15	6–10	T–5th	
1979–80	Guy Lewis	14–14	8–8	T–4th	
1980–81	Guy Lewis	21–9	10–6	T–2nd	NCAA Division I first round
1981–82	Guy Lewis	25–8	11–5	2nd	NCAA Division I Final Four
1982–83	Guy Lewis	31–3	16–0	1st	NCAA Division I Runner-up
1983–84	Guy Lewis	32–5	15–1	1st	NCAA Division I Runner-up
1984–85	Guy Lewis	16–14	8–8	T–5th	NIT first round
1985–86	Guy Lewis	14–14	8–8	6th	
Pat Foster (Southwest Conference) (1986–1993)
1986–87	Pat Foster	18–12	9–7	T–3rd	NCAA Division I first round
1987–88	Pat Foster	18–13	10–6	T–4th	NIT second round
1988–89	Pat Foster	17–14	8–8	T–4th	
1989–90	Pat Foster	25–8	13–3	2nd	NCAA Division I first round
1990–91	Pat Foster	18–11	10–6	3rd	NIT first round
1991–92	Pat Foster	25–6	11–3	T–1st	NCAA Division I first round
1992–93	Pat Foster	21–9	9–5	3rd	NIT first round
Alvin Brooks (Southwest Conference) (1993–1996)
1993–94	Alvin Brooks	8–19	5–9	6th	
1994–95	Alvin Brooks	9–19	5–9	6th	
1995–96	Alvin Brooks	17–10	11–3	2nd	
Alvin Brooks (Conference USA) (1996–1998)
1996–97	Alvin Brooks	11–16	3–11	4th (White)	
1997–98	Alvin Brooks	9–20	2–14	T–5th (National)	
Clyde Drexler (Conference USA) (1998–2000)
1998–99	Clyde Drexler	10–17	5–11	6th (National)	
1999–00	Clyde Drexler	9–22	2–14	6th (National)	
Ray McCallum (Conference USA) (2000–2004)
2000–01	Ray McCallum	9–20	6–10	5th (National)	
2001–02	Ray McCallum	18–15	9–7	2nd (National)	NIT Opening Round
2002–03	Ray McCallum	8–20	6–10	4th (National)	
2003–04	Ray McCallum	9–18	3–13	13th	
Tom Penders (Conference USA) (2004–2010)
2004–05	Tom Penders	18–14	9–7	T–4th	NIT first round
2005–06	Tom Penders	21–10	9–5	4th	NIT second round
2006–07	Tom Penders	18–15	10–6	3rd	
2007–08	Tom Penders	24–10	11–5	3rd	CBI Semifinal
2008–09	Tom Penders	21–12	10–6	T–4th	CBI first round
2009–10	Tom Penders	19–16	7–9	7th	NCAA Division I first round
James Dickey (Conference USA) (2010–2013)
2010–11	James Dickey	12–18	4–12	11th	
2011–12	James Dickey	15–15	7–9	T–8th	
2012–13	James Dickey	20–13	7–9	T–7th	CBI Quarterfinal
James Dickey (American Athletic Conference) (2013–2014)
2013–14	James Dickey	17–16	8–10	6th	
Kelvin Sampson (American Athletic Conference) (2014–2023)
2014–15	Kelvin Sampson	13–19	4–14	10th	
2015–16	Kelvin Sampson	22–10	12–6	T–3rd	NIT first round
2016–17	Kelvin Sampson	21–11	12–6	3rd	NIT first round
2017–18	Kelvin Sampson	27–8	14–4	T–2nd	NCAA Division I second round
2018–19	Kelvin Sampson	33–4	16–2	1st	NCAA Division I Sweet Sixteen
2019–20	Kelvin Sampson	23–8	13–5	T–1st	No postseason held
2020–21	Kelvin Sampson	28–4	14–3	2nd	NCAA Division I Final Four
2021–22	Kelvin Sampson	32–6	15–3	1st	NCAA Division I Elite Eight
2022–23	Kelvin Sampson	33–4	17–1	1st	NCAA Division I Sweet Sixteen
Kelvin Sampson (Big 12 Conference) (2023–present)
2023–24	Kelvin Sampson	32–5	15–3	1st	NCAA Division I Sweet Sixteen
2024–25	Kelvin Sampson	35–5	19–1	1st	NCAA Division I Runner-up
2025–26	Kelvin Sampson	30–7	14–4	2nd	NCAA Division I Sweet Sixteen
Total:		1,500–894			
National champion Postseason invitational champion Conference regular season champion Conference regular season and conference tournament champion Division regular season champion Division regular season and conference tournament champion Conference tournament champion
