= List of Houston Cougars men's basketball head coaches =

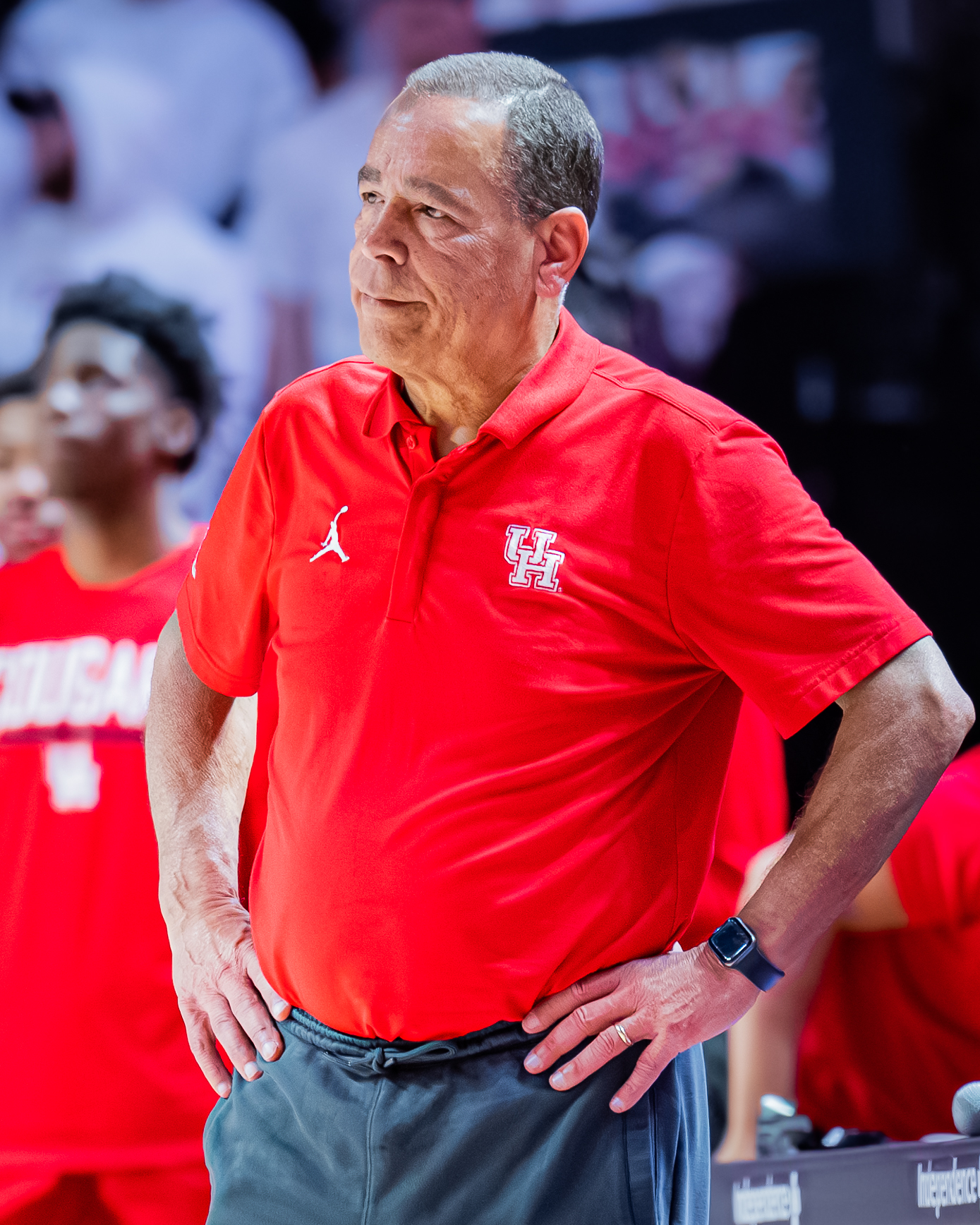
Kelvin Sampson, the current head coach of the Houston Cougars.

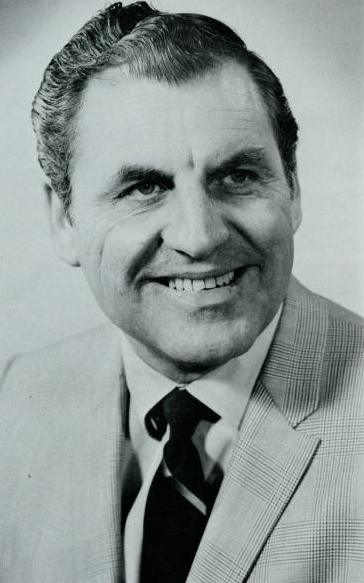
Guy Lewis, the winningest head coach in Cougars men's basketball history.

The following is a list of Houston Cougars men's basketball head coaches. There have been nine head coaches of the Cougars in their 80-season history.

Houston's current head coach is Kelvin Sampson. He was hired as the Cougars' head coach in April 2014, replacing James Dickey, who resigned after the 2013–14 season.

No.	Tenure	Coach	Years	Record	Pct.
1	1945–1956	Alden Pasche	11	135–116	.538
2	1956–1986	Guy Lewis	30	592–279	.680
3	1986–1993	Pat Foster	7	142–73	.660
4	1993–1998	Alvin Brooks	5	54–84	.391
5	1998–2000	Clyde Drexler	2	19–39	.328
6	2000–2004	Ray McCallum	4	44–73	.376
7	2004–2010	Tom Penders	6	121–77	.611
8	2010–2014	James Dickey	4	64–62	.508
9	2014–present	Kelvin Sampson	12	329–91	.783
Totals		9 coaches	81 seasons	1,500–894	.627
Records updated through end of 2025–26 season Source
