= 1945–46 Houston Cougars men's basketball team =

American college basketball season

1945–46 Houston Cougars men's basketball
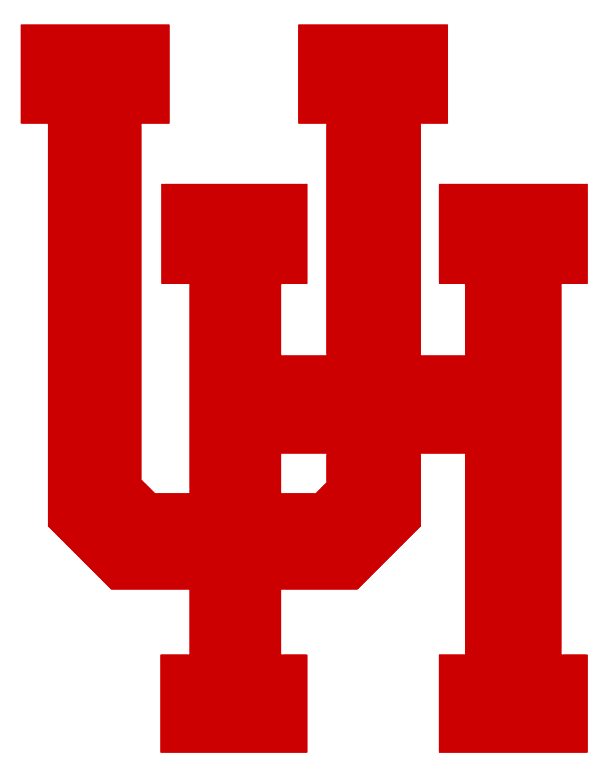

Lone Star Conference champions

NAIA Tournament, Second Round
- Conference: Lone Star Conference
- Record: 10–4 (8–2 LSC)
- Head coach: Alden Pasche (1st season)
- Assistant coach: Ned Thompson
- Home arena: Public School Fieldhouse

The 1945–46 Houston Cougars men's basketball team represented the University of Houston in the college basketball 1945–46 season. It was their inaugural year of season play. The head coach for the Cougars was Alden Pasche, who was serving in his 1st year in that position. The team played its home games at Public School Fieldhouse on-campus in Houston and were members of the Lone Star Conference. Houston captured its first conference regular season title, and competed in the postseason in the 1946 NAIA basketball tournament where they were defeated by eventual national runner-up Indiana State in the second round.

== Roster ==
Charlie Manichia also served as Houston's first starting quarterback. Guy Lewis served as an assistant for Houston from 1953 to 1956, and as head coach from 1956 to 1986.

1945–46 Houston Cougars men's basketball team
Players
Coaches

Pos.	#	Name	Height	Weight	Year	Hometown
	31	Charlie Manichia	5 ft 9 in (1.75 m)	170 lb (77 kg)	So	Houston, Texas
	31	Bill McPhail	—	—
	32	Bobby Dwyer	—	—
F	33	Charlie Carpenter	5 ft 11 in (1.8 m)	—	So
G	34	Simon Wiederman	5 ft 10 in (1.78 m)	—	Sr
	36	Bill Swanson	—	—
C	37	Guy Lewis (C)	6 ft 3 in (1.91 m)	—	So	Arp, Texas
	38	Billy Graham	—	—
F	39	Willie Wells (C)	6 ft 3 in (1.91 m)	—	Jr	Houston, Texas
F	40	Dick Pratt	—	—
G		Louis Brown	5 ft 11 in (1.8 m)	—	Fr

Head coach

- Alden Pasche (Rice)

Assistant coach(es)

- Ned Thompson (Stephen F. Austin)

Legend

- (C) Team captain
- (S) Suspended
- (I) Ineligible
- (W) Walk-on
- Injured
- Current redshirt

Roster
Last update: 2011-02-09

== Schedule ==
Date time, TV	Opponent	Result	Record	Site city, state
Regular Season
01/10/1946	North Texas State	W 62–35	1–0 (1–0)	Public School Fieldhouse; Houston, Texas
01/17/1946	Sam Houston State	L 40–41	1–1 (1–1)	Public School Fieldhouse; Houston, Texas
02/02/1946	Southwest Texas State	W 62–57	2–1 (2–1)	Public School Fieldhouse; Houston, Texas
02/04/1946*	at Southwestern	W 42–40	3–1	Unknown; Georgetown, Texas
02/08/1946	at Sam Houston State	L 39–40	3–2 (2–2)	Sam Houston State Gymnasium; Huntsville, Texas
02/09/1946	at Stephen F. Austin State	W 45–38	4–2 (3–2)	Shelton Gymnasium; Nacogdoches, Texas
02/16/1946	East Texas State	W 54–51	5–2 (4–2)	Public School Fieldhouse; Houston, Texas
02/19/1946*	Southwestern	L 57–58	5–3	Public School Fieldhouse; Houston, Texas
02/20/1946	at Southwest Texas State	W 62–55	6–3 (5–2)	Unknown; San Marcos, Texas
02/23/1946	Stephen F. Austin State	W 65–39	7–3 (6–2)	Public School Fieldhouse; Houston, Texas
03/01/1946	at North Texas State	W 61–56	8–3 (7–2)	Unknown; Denton, Texas
03/02/1946	at East Texas State	W 61–54	9–3 (8–2)	Whitley Gymnasium; Commerce, Texas
NAIA Tournament
03/11/1946*	vs. High Point; First Round	W 63–34	10–3	Municipal Auditorium; Kansas City, Missouri
03/13/1946*	vs. Indiana State; Second Round	L 43–62	10–4	Municipal Auditorium; Kansas City, Missouri
*Non-conference game. (#) Tournament seedings in parentheses.
