= 1946–47 Marshall Thundering Herd men's basketball team =

American college basketball season

1946–47 Marshall Thundering Herd men's basketball

NAIA tournament, Champions
- Conference: Independent
- Record: 32–5
- Head coach: Cam Henderson

The 1946–47 Marshall Thundering Herd men's basketball team represented Marshall College (now Marshall University) in the 1946–47 college basketball season. They and were led by 12th year head coach Cam Henderson. Marshall won the 1947 NAIA basketball tournament National Championship held at Municipal Auditorium in Kansas City, Missouri. The 10th annual men's basketball tournament of what is now the National Association of Intercollegiate Athletics (NAIA) featured 32 teams playing in a single-elimination format.

== Roster ==
1946–47 Marshall Thundering Herd men's basketball team
Players
Coaches

Pos.	#	Name	Height	Weight	Year	Hometown
		Fred Altizer	—	—
		Jim Bakalis	—	—
		Dick Erickson	—	—
		Mervin Gutshell	—	—
		Bill Hall	—	—
		Gene James	—	—		Ironton, Ohio
		Ed Little	—	—
		Al Mazza	—	—
		Andy Tonkovich	—	—		Wheeling, West Virginia
		Bill Toothman	—	—
		Jimmy Van Zant	—	—
		Bob Wright	—	—

Head coach

- Cam Henderson

Assistant coach(es)

- None

Legend

- (C) Team captain
- (S) Suspended
- (I) Ineligible
- (W) Walk-on
- Injured
- Current redshirt

Roster
Last update: 2019-04-13

== Schedule and results ==
Date time, TV	Rank^{#}	Opponent^{#}	Result	Record	Site city, state
Regular Season
December 5, 1946		Kentucky Wesleyan	W 76–53	1–0	Vanity Fair; Huntington, WV
December 13, 1946		Morehead State	W 54–50	2–0	Vanity Fair; Huntington, WV
December 16, 1946		Xavier	W 56–47	3–0	Vanity Fair; Huntington, WV
December 20, 1946		Murray State	W 68–59	4–0	Vanity Fair; Huntington, WV
December 26, 1946		vs. Eastern Illinois; Midwest Tournament	W 67–60	5–0	Indiana State Gymnasium; Terre Haute, IN
December 27, 1946		at Indiana State; Midwest Tournament	W 66–58	6–0	Indiana State Gymnasium; Terre Haute, IN
December 28, 1946		vs. Xavier; Midwest Tournament	W 75–58	7–0	Indiana State Gymnasium; Terre Haute, IN
December 30, 1946		Toronto	W 84–40	8–0	Vanity Fair; Huntington, WV
January 3, 1947		Creighton	W 54–46	9–0	Vanity Fair; Huntington, WV
January 6, 1947		Morris Harvey	W 86–65	10–0	Vanity Fair; Huntington, WV
January 11, 1947		at Akron	W 63–61	11–0	Akron Armory; Akron, OH
January 13, 1947		Concord	W 87–45	12–0	Vanity Fair; Huntington, WV
January 17, 1947		at Xavier	W 53–41	13–0	Schmidt Fieldhouse; Cincinnati, OH
January 18, 1947		at Dayton	W 65–61	14–0	Montgomery County Fairgrounds Coliseum; Dayton, OH
January 20, 1947		at Concord	W 86–47	15–0	Athens, WV
January 24, 1947		at Morehead State	W 69–65	16–0	Button Auditorium; Morehead, KY
January 27, 1947		West Liberty	W 94–44	17–0	Vanity Fair; Huntington, WV
January 31, 1947		Cincinnati	L 54–66	17–1	Vanity Fair; Huntington, WV
February 1, 1947		at Kentucky Wesleyan	W 61–53	18–1	Owensboro, KY
February 4, 1947		at West Liberty	W 72–49	19–1	Benwood, WV
February 8, 1947		Louisville	W 62–55	20–1	Vanity Fair; Huntington, WV
February 10, 1947		at Morris Harvey	W 44–34	21–1	Charleston, WV
February 15, 1947		DePauw	W 73–58	22–1	Vanity Fair; Huntington, WV
February 18, 1947		at Cincinnati	L 42–53	22–2	Schmidlapp Gymnasium; Cincinnati, OH
February 19, 1947		vs. Miami (OH)	L 56–62	22–3	Jefferson County Armory; Louisville, KY
February 22, 1947		Dayton	W 79–53	23–3	Vanity Fair; Huntington, WV
February 24, 1947		at Evansville	L 69–73	23–4	Evansville, IN
February 25, 1947		Concordia (MO)	W 62–61	24–4	Vanity Fair; Huntington, WV
February 27, 1947		at Bradley	L 51–62	24–5	Peoria Armory; Peoria, IL
February 28, 1947		at Illinois Wesleyan	W 70–60	25–5	Bloomington, IL
March 3, 1947		Hawaii	W 84–57	26–5	Vanity Fair; Huntington, WV
March 7, 1947		Fort Knox	W 85–62	27–5	Vanity Fair; Huntington, WV
NAIA tournament
March 10, 1947		vs. River Falls State; First round	W 113–80	28–5	Municipal Auditorium; Kansas City, MO
March 12, 1947		vs. Hamline; Second round	W 55–54	29–5	Municipal Auditorium; Kansas City, MO
March 13, 1947		vs. Eastern Washington; Quarterfinals	W 56–48	30–5	Municipal Auditorium; Kansas City, MO
March 14, 1947		vs. Emporia State; Semfinals	W 56–55 ^{OT}	31–5	Municipal Auditorium; Kansas City, MO
March 15, 1947		vs. Mankota State; Finals	W 73–59	32–5	Municipal Auditorium; Kansas City, MO
*Non-conference game. ^{#}Rankings from AP Poll. (#) Tournament seedings in parentheses.
