= 1949–50 Houston Cougars men's basketball team =

American college basketball season

1949–50 Houston Cougars men's basketball
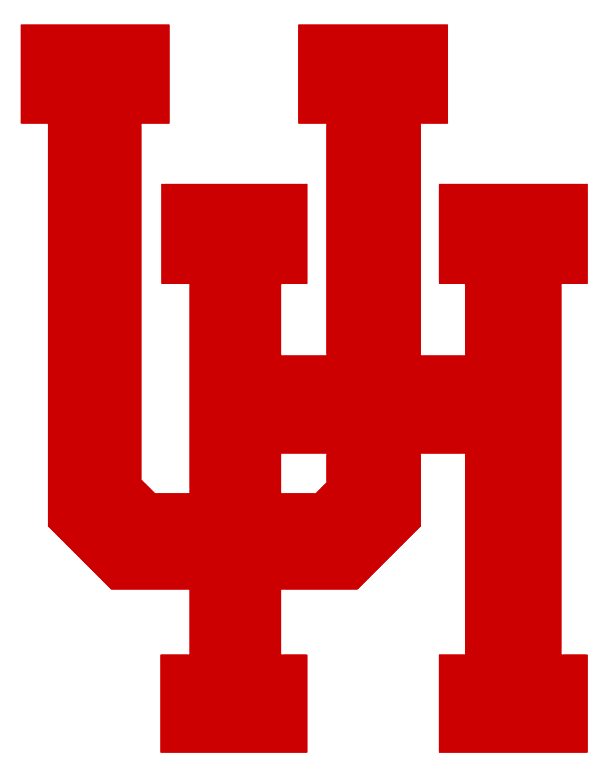

Gulf Coast Conference champions
- Conference: Gulf Coast Conference
- Record: 16–7 (6–0 GCC)
- Head coach: Alden Pasche (5th season)
- Assistant coach: Ned Thompson
- Home arena: Public School Fieldhouse

The 1949–50 Houston Cougars men's basketball team represented the University of Houston in the 1949–50 season of college basketball. It was their fifth year of season play. The head coach for the Cougars was Alden Pasche, who was serving in his 5th year in that position. The team played its home games at Public School Fieldhouse on-campus in Houston and were members of the Gulf Coast Conference. Houston captured its third conference regular season title.

== Roster ==
1949–50 Houston Cougars men's basketball team
Players
Coaches

Pos.	#	Name	Height	Weight	Year	Hometown
F	30	Lloyd Hendrix	6 ft 1 in (1.85 m)	—	Jr
G	32	Marvin Reichle (C)	6 ft 0 in (1.83 m)	—	Sr
G	35	Herb Richardson	6 ft 3 in (1.91 m)	—	Jr
F	37	Richard Berg (C)	6 ft 3 in (1.91 m)	—	Sr
C	38	David Rodriguez	6 ft 5 in (1.96 m)	—	So

Head coach

- Alden Pasche (Rice)

Assistant coach(es)

- Ned Thompson (Stephen F. Austin)

Legend

- (C) Team captain
- (S) Suspended
- (I) Ineligible
- (W) Walk-on
- Injured
- Current redshirt

== Schedule ==
Date time, TV	Opponent	Result	Record	Site city, state
Regular season
12/1/1949*	Hardin–Simmons	W 48–36	1–0	Public School Fieldhouse; Houston, Texas
12/2/1949*	Loyola (LA)	W 57–33	2–0	Public School Fieldhouse; Houston, Texas
12/6/1949*	at Bradley	L 57–73	2–1	Robertson Memorial Field House; Peoria, Illinois
12/8/1949*	at Loras	W 65–51	3–1	Unknown; Dubuque, Iowa
12/9/1949*	at Beloit	L 56–70	3–2	Unknown; Beloit, Wisconsin
12/10/1949*	at Marquette	L 65–69	3–3	Marquette Gymnasium; Milwaukee, Wisconsin
12/13/1949*	at Creighton	L 47–52	3–4	Creighton University Gym; Omaha, Nebraska
12/20/1949*	at Texas	L 44–46	3–5	Gregory Gymnasium; Austin, Texas
12/30/1949*	Wichita	W 72–66	4–5	Public School Fieldhouse; Houston, Texas
1/3/1950*	Pepperdine	W 47–46	5–5	Public School Fieldhouse; Houston, Texas
1/5/1950*	at Sam Houston State	W 58–52	6–5	Sam Houston State Gymnasium; Huntsville, Texas
1/7/1950	at Trinity (TX)	W 67–62	7–5 (1–0)	Unknown; San Antonio, Texas
1/11/1950	Hardin	W 63–38	8–5 (2–0)	Public School Fieldhouse; Houston, Texas
1/13/1950	at North Texas State	W 66–58	9–5 (3–0)	Men's Gymnasium; Denton, Texas
1/14/1950*	at Oklahoma City	L 51–60	9–6	Municipal Auditorium; Oklahoma City, Oklahoma
1/21/1950*	Oklahoma City	W 52–45	10–6	Public School Fieldhouse; Houston, Texas
2/1/1950*	Sam Houston State	W 85–57	11–6	Public School Fieldhouse; Houston, Texas
2/4/1950*	Stephen F. Austin State	W 62–55	12–6	Public School Fieldhouse; Houston, Texas
2/6/1950	North Texas State	W 62–55	13–6 (4–0)	Public School Fieldhouse; Houston, Texas
2/8/1950	Trinity (TX)	W 80–49	14–6 (5–0)	Public School Fieldhouse; Houston, Texas
2/11/1950*	at Stephen F. Austin State	W 55–51	15–6	Unknown; Nacogdoches, Texas
2/17/1950	at Hardin	W 68–40	16–6 (6–0)	Unknown; Wichita Falls, Texas
2/25/1950*	at Loyola (LA)	L 50–58	16–7	Unknown; New Orleans, Louisiana
*Non-conference game. ^{#}Rankings from AP Poll. (#) Tournament seedings in parentheses.
