= Harry D. Payne =

American architect

Harry Daniel Payne
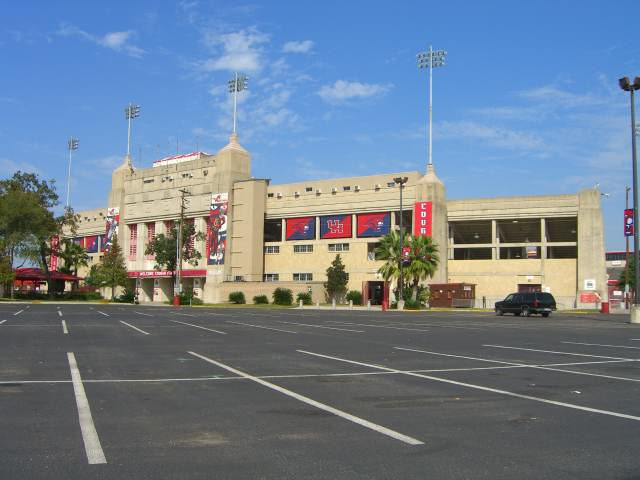
- John O'Quinn Field at Corbin J. Robertson Stadium
- Born: 1891; St. Louis, Missouri, US
- Died: 1987 (aged 95–96)
- Education: Washington University in St. Louis
- Occupation: Architect

Harry Daniel Payne (1891–1987) was an American architect and engineer; protégé of noted St. Louis Architect, William Ittner. Payne is most known for building designs in the U.S. State of Texas after 1926, but before this as a member of the Ittner Firm, he designed schools and hospitals in other states. Payne was born in St. Louis, Missouri, and was trained at Washington University in St. Louis. Upon graduation, he attended Fort Sheridan Officers Training School, and served in World War I in Company H, 320th Infantry, 80th Division. On September 25–26, 1918 he fought in the Meuse-Argone Offensive, leading men of H Company to take Dead Man's Hill (Le Mort Homme). Payne received a battlefield commission to Captain just before the Armistice. He returned to St. Louis after the war to work with the Ittner form until 1926. That year he was recruited by Houston School Board to design all new schools for the city. After this contract was completed he went on to design schools, jails, office buildings, stadiums, houses and museums in Texas including for Anahuac ISD, Beaumont ISD, Corpus Christi ISD, Houston ISD, and Huntsville ISD.

After December 7, 1941, Payne tried to secure the renewal of his WWI Commission as Captain, but was refused because of disabilities resulting from injuries in the First World War. He found an outlet for his desire to serve by applying at Brown Shipbuilding in Houston where he worked on the design of destroyers, frigates escorts and landing craft. The USS Stewart is one surviving example of this work.

Payne was an active member of the American Institute of Architects, and was awarded the Edward C. Kemper Award by the organization in 1962.

== List of works built ==
- River Oaks Elementary (1926) Houston
- Wharton Elementary (1926) Houston
- DeZavalla Elementary (1926) Houston
- Eugene Field Elementary (1926) Houston
- Andrew P. Briscoe Elementary (1926) Houston
- Rufus Cage Elementary (1926) Houston
- Edgar Allan Poe School (1926) Houston
- Ashbel Smith Elementary (1927) Houston
- Robert Louis Stevenson Elementary (1927) Houston
- Hogg Junior High School (1928) Goose Creek (Baytown)
- Cedar Bayou High School (1928) Cedar Bayou
- Robert E. Lee High School (1928) Goose Creek (Baytown)
- Governor William P. Hobby House (1928, 1936, 1939) Houston
- M. C. Parker & Co. Offices (1928) Houston
- Richmond Home Economics Cottage (1928) Richmond, Texas
- Alta Loma/Santa Fe High School (1928) Santa Fe
- Gasow-Howard Motor Co. (1929) Beaumont
- Beaumont High School (1929) Beaumont
- Wheatley High School (1929) Houston
- William Gaston Love Elementary (1929) Houston
- El Campo Ag Shop and Laboratory (1929) El Campo
- Deer Park High School (1930)
- Charles Bender High School (1930) Humble
- Bay City High School (1930) Bay City
- Barbers Hill High School (1930)
- Midfield Common School No. 10 (1930) Midfield, Texas
- Clifford Smith House (1930) Houston
- Channelview Elementary (1930)
- Harris County Elementary School #18 (1930) Houston
- Edward Griffey House (1930) Houston
- Huntsville High School and athletic field (1931) Huntsville
- Harry F. Estill Home (1931) Huntsville
- A. C. Standley House (1931) Huntsville
- Bay City M. E. Church Educational Building (1931) Bay City
- Matagorda County Jail (1931) Bay City
- LaWard Elementary/High School (1931) LaWard
- Dodge Rural High School (1931) Dodge, Texas
- Edward Boettcher House (1933) Huntsville
- Crabbs Prairie School #1 (1933) Huntsville
- Markham High School (1934) Markham
- Nelson Stiles House (1934) Baytown
- William C. Holt House (1934) Angleton
- Blessing High School (1934)
- Walker County Jail (1934), Huntsville
- John Seale Junior High School (1934) Corpus Christi
- Markham High School (1934)
- Rusk State Hospital Ward Building (1935) Rusk
- August Kraft House (1935) Bay Villa (Baytown)
- Garwood High School (1935)
- Almeda High School (1935)
- Albert M. Ball House (1935) Houston
- Mirabeau B. Lamar High School (1935) Houston; with John F. Staub, Kenneth Franzheim, Louis A. Glover, and Lamar Q. Cato
- Palacios High School (1935,1936) Palacios
- H. Gillmore Webster House (1935) Houston
- Sam Houston Memorial Museum Rotunda (1936), Huntsville
- J. S. Palmer House (1935) Baytown
- W. W. Floyd House (1936) Huntsville
- Hockley Rural High School#3 Auditorium (1936)
- New Caney High School (1936)
- Center High School (1936) Center, Texas
- Anahuac High School (1936)
- C. M. Hurst House (1937) Baytown
- Don S. Freese House (1937) Baytown
- A. E. Lindquist House (1937) Baytown
- Raymond P. Elledge House (1937) Baytown
- Stuart MacKay House (1937) Baytown
- Fred Page House (1937) Houston
- W. O. Cox House (1937) Houston
- H. F. Ireland House (1937) Houston
- Sam Houston State College Chapel Improvements (1937) Huntsville
- Sam Houston State College Farm Boys Dormitory (1937) Huntsville
- Sam Houston State College open air theater (Greek amphitheater) (1937) Huntsville
- E. Q. Camp House (1937) Baytown
- Hugh G. Henderson office and warehouse (1937) Houston
- H. W. Wells House (1938) Ganado
- W. W. Harris House (1938) Baytown
- Angleton High School Gymnasium (1938)
- Huntsville M. E. Church south addition (1938) Huntsville
- Sam Houston State College Andrew Jackson Hall (1938) Huntsville
- N. D. Stiles Lumber Co. (1938) Baytown
- Deer Park Physical Education Building (1938)
- Max Rodgers House (1938) Huntsville, Texas
- Bering Memorial M. E. Church (1938) Houston
- A. A. Wells House (1938) Houston, Texas
- Harry D. Payne House (1939) Houston, Texas
- Whitehead House (1939) Houston, Texas
- Markham High School additions (1939)
- Sam Houston State College Stadium (1940) Huntsville
- Elizabeth Elliott Hall (1940) Huntsville
- F. H. Ireland House (1940) Houston
- Ben D. Ward House, (1940) Baytown
- Hugh Henderson House (1940) Houston
- Albert Wadsworth House (1941) Bay City
- Air Training Center (1941) Huntsville
- Jeppesen Gymnasium (1941) Houston
- John O'Quinn Field at Robertson Stadium (1941) Houston
- R. F. Parsons House (1941) Houston
- Sam Houston State College improvements to Old Main (1942) Huntsville
- Sam Houston State College Classroom Building (1942) Huntsville
- Sam Houston State College Halley Hall Science Building (1942) Huntsville
- Sam Houston State College Campus Development Plan (1943) Huntsville
- Rugley Motor Co. (19450 Bay City
- Sam Houston State College Apartments (1945) Huntsville
- Sam Houston State College Josey School of Vocational Arts (1945) Huntsville
- Bay City Bank and Trust Co. (1945)
- Smither Office Building (1945) Huntsville
- Palacios Hospital (1944)
- Sam Houston State College conversion of POW Camp to Country Campus (1946) Huntsville
- First National Bank of Bay City (1947) Bay City
- Deer Park Comprehensive Building (1947)
- W. W. Harris House (1947) Baytown
- Herbert C. May House (1948) Houston
- Deer Park Lynchburg Elementary (1948)
- Christ Presbyterian Church school building (1948) Houston
- Hugh Henderson Laundry Equipment office and warehouse (1948) Houston
- Deer Park High School swimming pool (1949) Deer Park
- Nelson D. Stiles Store Shop and Offices (1950) Baytown
- Deer Park lunchroom, music building, football field, auto mechanics shop (1950)
- Deer Park San Jacinto Elementary (1950)
- Christ Presbyterian Church Sanctuary (1952) Houston
- Robert Earl Wolters house (1952) Columbus
- Columbus State Bank (1952) Columbus
- Denver Presbyterian Church Sanctuary (1953) Denver, Co.
- Spring Branch Presbyterian Church fellowship hall (1954) Spring Branch
- F. H. Luther garden room (1955) Houston
- Henry Beck garden room and air conditioning (1955) Houston
- Norman Way plant room (1955) Houston
- Dr. T. P. Shearer House (1959) Houston
- Tyler C. Clark House (1959) Columbus
- Cohen Estates Abe Gollob (1959)
- Bering Bearing Service (1959) Houston
- Spring Branch Presbyterian Church classrooms (1960) Spring Branch
- Harold Steadman Credit Co. (1963) LaBranch, Texas
- Henry J. Beck Kitchen (1963)
- Bering Bearing Service Accounting Dept building and warehouse (1966) Houston
