= Alden Pasche =

American basketball coach (1910–1986)

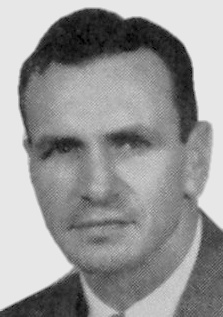
- Pasche, ca. 1947

Biographical details
- Born: July 19, 1910; Houston, Texas, U.S.
- Died: May 9, 1986 (aged 75); Houston, Texas, U.S.

Playing career

Football
- 1930–1931: Rice

Coaching career (HC unless noted)

Basketball
- 1945–1956: Houston

Football
- 1946–1947: Houston (assistant)

Head coaching record
- Overall: 135–116 (.538) (college)
- Tournaments: 0–2 (NCAA); 2–2 (NAIA)

Accomplishments and honors

Championships
- 2 LSC regular season (1946, 1947); GCC regular season (1950); MVC regular season (1956)

Awards
- MVC Coach of the Year (1956)

Herbert Alden Pasche (July 19, 1910 – May 9, 1986) was the first head coach of the Houston Cougars men's basketball team from 1945 to 1956. Pasche also served off as an assistant coach for the Houston Cougars football program as a line coach from 1946 to 1947. While at the university, Pasche served as an associate professor of health and physical education. Pasche was a 1932 graduate of Rice University, where he played football as an end for the Rice Owls.

During Pasche's tenure, he posted a 135–116 record. Under his leadership in 1949, the Cougars won the Gulf Coast Conference championship. Hall of Fame coach Guy Lewis played for Pasche, eventually becoming an assistant coach before being handed the job upon Pasche's retirement.

== Head coaching record ==
Record table
Season	Team	Overall	Conference	Standing	Postseason
Houston Cougars (Lone Star Conference) (1945–1949)
1945–46	Houston	10–4	8–2	1st	NAIA Second Round
1946–47	Houston	15–7	11–1	1st	NAIA Second Round
1947–48	Houston	11–11	6–6		
1948–49	Houston	11–11	7–5		
Houston Cougars (Gulf Coast Conference) (1949–1950)
1949–50	Houston	16–7	6–0	1st	
Houston Cougars (Missouri Valley Conference) (1950–1956)
1950–51	Houston	11–17	2–12	8th	
1951–52	Houston	7–14	3–7	5th	
1952–53	Houston	9–13	5–5	2nd	
1953–54	Houston	11–15	3–7	5th	
1954–55	Houston	15–10	3–7	5th	
1955–56	Houston	19–7	9–3	1st	NCAA Regional Semifinals
Houston:		135–116 (.538)	63–55 (.534)		
Total:		135–116 (.538)			
National champion Postseason invitational champion Conference regular season champion Conference regular season and conference tournament champion Division regular season champion Division regular season and conference tournament champion Conference tournament champion
