= 1946–47 Houston Cougars men's basketball team =

American college basketball season

1946–47 Houston Cougars men's basketball
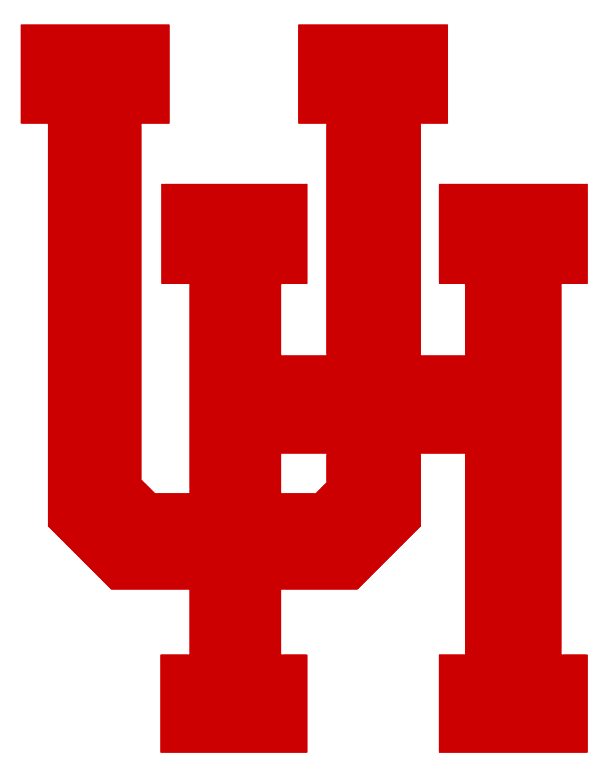

Lone Star Conference champions

NAIA Tournament, Second Round
- Conference: Lone Star Conference
- Record: 15–7 (11–1 LSC)
- Head coach: Alden Pasche (2nd season)
- Assistant coach: Ned Thompson
- Home arena: Public School Fieldhouse

The 1946–47 Houston Cougars men's basketball team represented the University of Houston in the college basketball 1946–47 season. It was their second year of season play. The head coach for the Cougars was Alden Pasche, who was serving in his 2nd year in that position. The team played its home games at Public School Fieldhouse on-campus in Houston and were members of the Lone Star Conference. Houston captured its second conference regular season title, and competed in the postseason in the 1947 NAIA basketball tournament where they were defeated by Arizona State–Flagstaff (now known as Northern Arizona) in the second round.

== Schedule ==
Date time, TV	Opponent	Result	Record	Site city, state
Regular season
12/07/1946*	Loyola (LA)	L 39–51	0–1	Public School Fieldhouse; Houston, Texas
12/11/1946*	at Tulane	L 49–62	0–2	Tulane Gym; New Orleans, Louisiana
12/12/1946*	at Loyola (LA)	L 57–62	0–3	Unknown; New Orleans, Louisiana
12/16/1946*	Southeastern State	W 63–56	1–3	Public School Fieldhouse; Houston, Texas
12/17/1946*	Southeastern State	W 47–44	2–3	Public School Fieldhouse; Houston, Texas
12/20/1946*	Pepperdine; Houston Intercollegiate	L 61–73	2–4	Public School Fieldhouse; Houston, Texas
12/21/1946*	Stephen F. Austin State; Houston Intercollegiate	L 43–54	2–5	Public School Fieldhouse; Houston, Texas
12/28/1946*	Texas A&M; Houston Intercollegiate	W 62–41	3–5	Public School Fieldhouse; Houston, Texas
01/06/1947	at Southwest Texas State	W 55–39	4–5 (1–0)	Unknown; San Marcos, Texas
01/07/1947 no, no	at Trinity (TX)	W 74–37	5–5 (2–0)	Unknown; San Antonio, Texas
01/17/1947	Sam Houston State	L 55–59	5–6 (2–1)	Public School Fieldhouse; Houston, Texas
01/29/1947	at Sam Houston State	W 49–48	6–6 (3–1)	Sam Houston State Gymnasium; Huntsville, Texas
02/01/1947	East Texas State	W 65–61	7–6 (4–1)	Public School Fieldhouse; Houston, Texas
02/08/1947	Trinity (TX)	W 68–34	8–6 (5–1)	Public School Fieldhouse; Houston, Texas
02/14/1947	North Texas State	W 70–53	9–6 (6–1)	Public School Fieldhouse; Houston, Texas
02/15/1947	Southwest Texas State	W 98–60	10–6 (7–1)	Public School Fieldhouse; Houston, Texas
02/17/1947	at Stephen F. Austin State	W 67–61	11–6 (8–1)	Unknown; Nacogdoches, Texas
02/22/1947	Stephen F. Austin State	W 60–57	12–6 (9–1)	Public School Fieldhouse; Houston, Texas
02/28/1947	at East Texas State	W 60–51	13–6 (10–1)	Unknown; Commerce, Texas
03/01/1947	at North Texas State	W 60–51	14–6 (11–1)	Unknown; Denton, Texas
NAIA Tournament
03/11/1947*	vs. Montana State; First Round	W 60–58	15–6	Municipal Auditorium; Kansas City, Missouri
03/12/1947*	vs. Arizona State–Flagstaff; Second Round	L 42–44 ^{3OT}	15–7	Municipal Auditorium; Kansas City, Missouri
*Non-conference game. (#) Tournament seedings in parentheses.
