= Bob Wright (basketball) =

American basketball coach

Robert G. Wright (March 31, 1926 – April 15, 2012) was an American college basketball coach. He coached Morehead State University for three seasons, and won a Kentucky high school state championship in 1961 as coach of the Ashland High School.

Wright played collegiate basketball at Marshall. After a stint in the United States Navy, Wright became a successful high school coach for Ashland and Vanceburg High School. In 1965, he left to try his hand at college coaching at Morehead State. He stayed from 1965 to 1969, accumulating a record of 58–38. His 1968–69 Eagles squad were Ohio Valley Conference co-champions with an 18–9 season record. He then left coaching to pursue a career in education.

On April 15, 2012, Wright died at the age of 86 in Pikeville, Kentucky.
