= Louis Dunbar =

Basketball player and coach

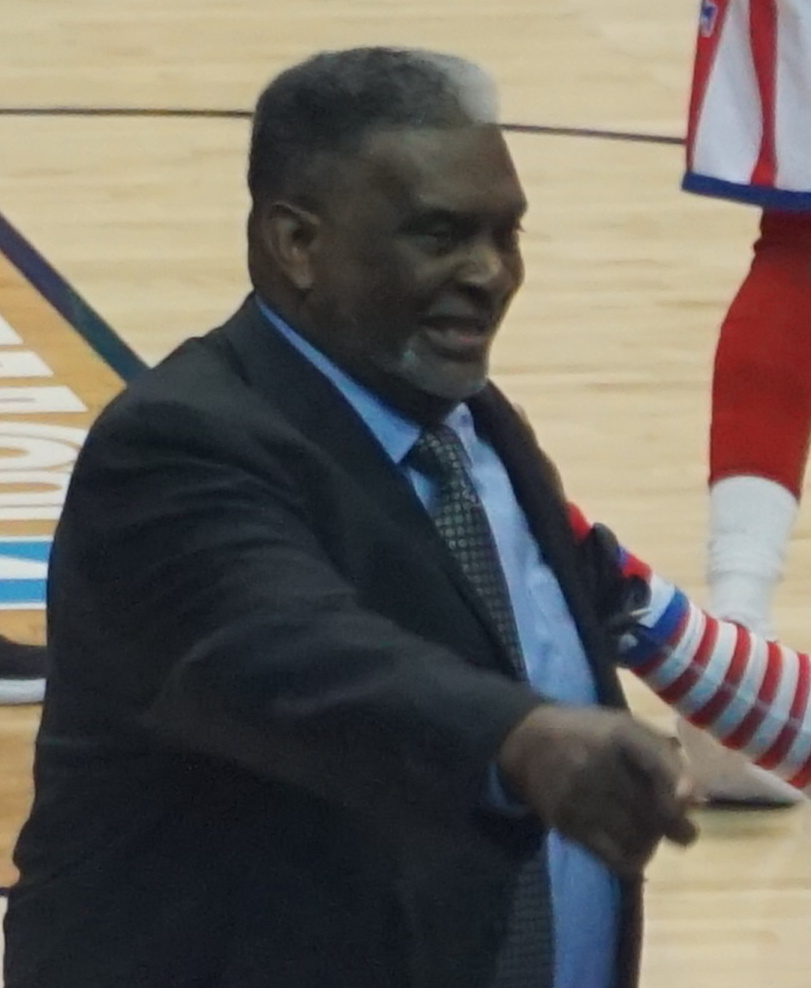
- Louis "Sweet Lou" Dunbar during a Globetrotters game

Personal information
- Born: August 8, 1953 (age 73) Minden, Louisiana, U.S.
- Listed height: 6 ft 9 in (2.06 m)

Career information
- High school: Webster (Minden, Louisiana)
- College: Houston (1972–1975)
- NBA draft: 1975: 4th round, 59th overall pick
- Drafted by: Philadelphia 76ers
- Playing career: 1975–1977
- Position: Small forward

Career history
- 1975–1977: SP Federale

Career highlights
- As player: Swiss League champion (1976); Louisiana Mr. Basketball (1971)
- Stats at Basketball Reference

Louis "Sweet Lou" Dunbar (born August 8, 1953) is the Director of Player Personnel, a coach, and a former 27-year veteran basketball player for the Harlem Globetrotters.

== High school ==
He won a high school state championship in his senior year of high school and was named the Louisiana Mr. Basketball.

== College career ==
Dunbar played college basketball at the University of Houston, with the Houston Cougars, from 1972 to 1975. He averaged 22.3 points, 7.7 rebounds, and 4.1 assists per game during his college career.

== Professional career ==
Dunbar was selected in the 4th round, with the 59th overall pick of the 1975 NBA draft, by the Philadelphia 76ers. However, he never played in the NBA. Instead, he played professional basketball in Switzerland, with SP Federale. With Federale, he won the Swiss League championship in 1976. He also played with SP Federale in the EuroLeague, during the 1975–76 season.

After ending his pro club career in 1977, Dunbar joined the Harlem Globetrotters.

== Coaching career ==
Dunbar served as a boys’ basketball coach in the Houston area, and also conducted private basketball lessons. He has also coached at the First Presbyterian School.

== Personal life ==
Dunbar is a member of "Legends of Basketball", the National Basketball Retired Players Association. He was inducted into the University of Houston Hall of Honor on November 15, 2008.
