= Houston Cougars men's basketball =

American basketball team

2026–27 Houston Cougars men's basketball team
- University: University of Houston
- First season: 1945–46; 81 years ago
- Athletic director: Eddie Nuñez
- Head coach: Kelvin Sampson; 13th season, 329–91 (.783)
- Location: Houston, Texas
- Arena: Fertitta Center (capacity: 7,100)
- NCAA division: Division I
- Conference: Big 12
- Nickname: Cougars
- Colors: Scarlet and white
- Student section: The Cage
- All-time record: 1,500–894 (.627)
- NCAA tournament record: 47–32 (.595)

NCAA Division I tournament runner-up
- 1983, 1984, 2025
Other NCAA Division I tournament results
Final Four	1967, 1968, 1982, 1983, 1984, 2021, 2025
Elite Eight	1967, 1968, 1982, 1983, 1984, 2021, 2022, 2025
Sweet Sixteen	1956, 1961, 1965, 1966, 1967, 1968, 1970, 1971, 1982, 1983, 1984, 2019, 2021, 2022, 2023, 2024, 2025, 2026
Appearances	1956, 1961, 1965, 1966, 1967, 1968, 1970, 1971, 1972, 1973, 1978, 1981, 1982, 1983, 1984, 1987, 1990, 1992, 2010, 2018, 2019, 2021, 2022, 2023, 2024, 2025, 2026

Conference tournament champions
- SWC: 1978, 1981, 1983, 1984, 1992 C-USA: 2010 AAC: 2021, 2022 Big 12: 2025

Conference regular-season champions
- LSC: 1946, 1947 GCC: 1950 MVC: 1956 SWC: 1983, 1984, 1992 AAC: 2019, 2020, 2022, 2023 Big 12: 2024, 2025

Uniforms
Home	Away

The Houston Cougars men's basketball team represents the University of Houston in Houston, Texas, in NCAA Division I men's basketball competition. They compete as members of the Big 12 Conference. In addition to 27 NCAA tournament appearances, the Cougars have won 22 conference championships and have had three players and a coach elected to the Basketball Hall of Fame.

== History ==
=== Early history (1945–56) ===
Although the University of Houston already had a women's basketball program, the Houston Cougars men's basketball program did not begin until the 1945–46 season. Alden Pasche was the team's first head coach. In their first two seasons, the Cougars won Lone Star Conference regular-season titles and qualified for postseason play in the NAIA Men's Basketball tournaments in 1946 and 1947. The Cougars had an all-time NAIA tournament record of 2–2 in two years.

During Pasche's tenure, the Cougars posted a 135–116 record. Under his leadership in 1950, the Cougars won the Gulf Coast Conference championship. Future College Basketball Hall of Fame coach Guy Lewis played for Pasche, eventually becoming an assistant coach before being handed the job upon Pasche's retirement.

=== Guy Lewis era (1956–86) ===
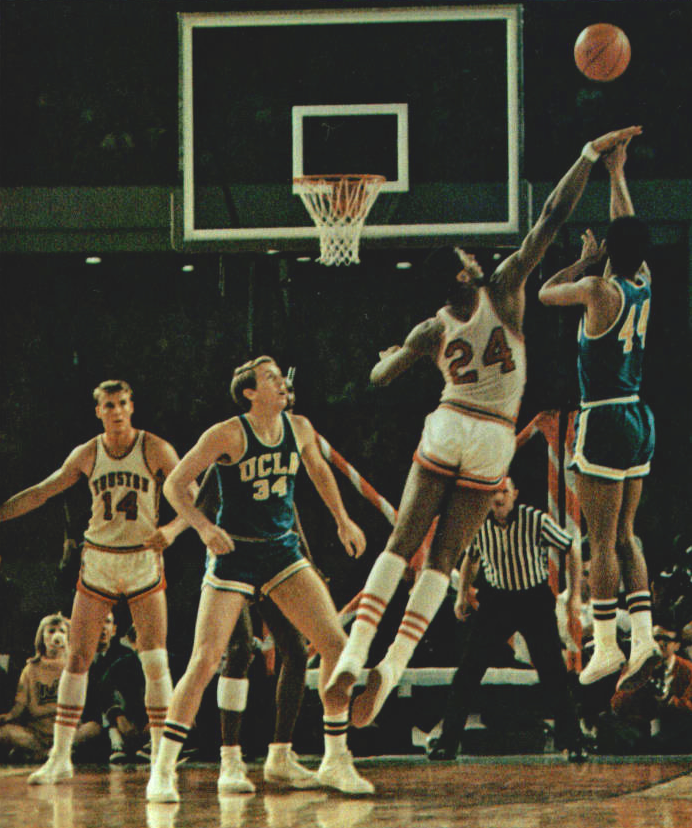
Houston's Don Chaney blocks a shot against UCLA in the 1968 Game of the Century.

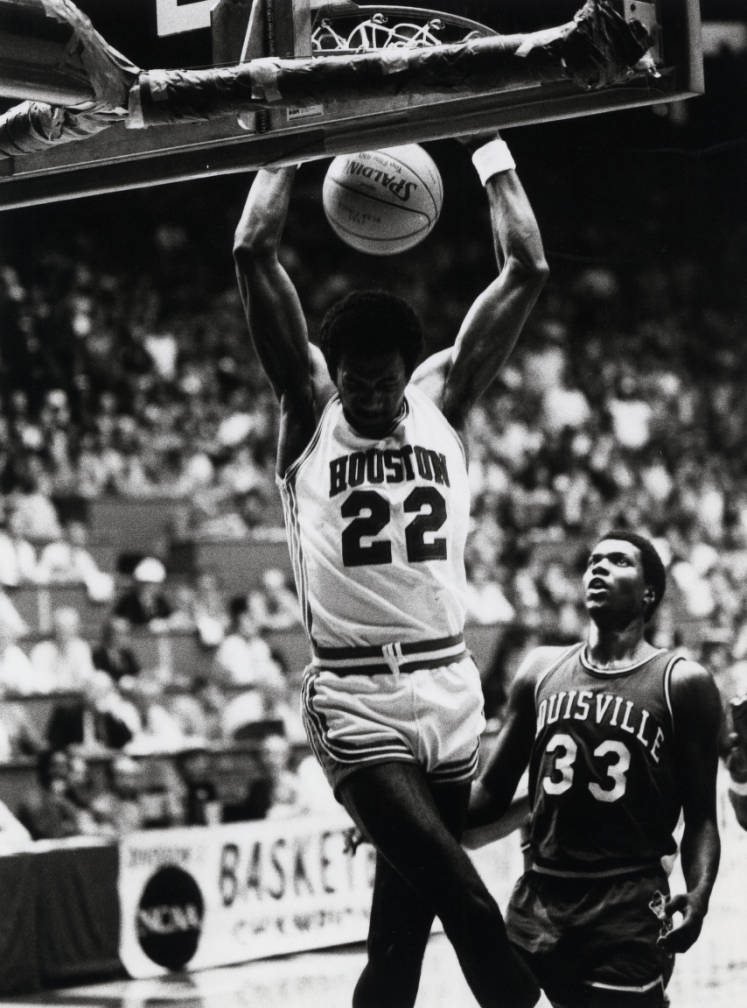
Clyde Drexler performs a slam dunk as a member of the Houston Cougars men's basketball team under Lewis.

Pasche retired after the 1955–56 season, and Houston assistant Guy Lewis was promoted to the head coaching position. Lewis, a former Cougar player, led Houston to 27 straight winning seasons and 14 seasons with 20 or more wins, including 14 trips to the NCAA tournament. His Houston teams made the Final Four on five occasions (1967, 1968, 1982–84) and twice advanced to the NCAA Championship Game (1983, 1984). Among the outstanding players who Lewis coached are Elvin Hayes, Hakeem Olajuwon, Clyde Drexler, Otis Birdsong, Dwight Jones, Dwight Davis, Don Chaney and Louis "Sweet Lou" Dunbar.

Lewis's UH teams twice played key roles in high-profile events that helped to popularize college basketball as a spectator sport. In 1968, his underdog, Elvin Hayes-led Cougars upset the undefeated and top-ranked UCLA Bruins in front of more than 50,000 fans at Houston's Astrodome. The game became known as the “Game of the Century” and marked a watershed in the popularity of college basketball. In the early 1980s, Lewis's Phi Slama Jama teams at UH gained notoriety for their fast-breaking, "above the rim" style of play as well as their overall success. These teams attracted great public interest with their entertaining style of play. At the height of Phi Slama Jama's notoriety, they suffered a dramatic, last-second loss in the 1983 NCAA Final that set a then-ratings record for college basketball broadcasts and became an iconic moment in the history of the sport. Lewis's insistence that these highly successful teams play an acrobatic, up-tempo brand of basketball that emphasized dunking brought this style of play to the fore and helped popularize it amongst younger players.

Houston lost in both NCAA Final games in which Lewis coached, despite his "Phi Slama Jama" teams featuring superstars Clyde Drexler and Hakeem Olajuwon. In 1983, Houston lost in a dramatic title game to the North Carolina State Wolfpack on a last-second dunk by Lorenzo Charles. The Cougars lost in the 1984 NCAA Final to the Georgetown Hoyas, led by Patrick Ewing. Lewis retired from coaching in 1986 at number 20 in all-time NCAA Division I victories, his 592–279 record giving him a .680 career winning percentage.

As a coach, Lewis was known for championing the once-outlawed dunk, which he characterized as a "high percentage shot", and for clutching a brightly colored red-and-white polka dot towel on the bench during games. Lewis was a major force in the racial integration of college athletics in the South during the 1960s, being one of the first major college coaches in the region to actively recruit African-American athletes. His recruitment of Elvin Hayes and Don Chaney in 1964 ushered in an era of tremendous success in Cougar basketball. The dominant play of Hayes led the Cougars to two Final Fours and sent shock waves through Southern colleges that realized that they would have to begin recruiting black players if they wanted to compete with integrated teams.

=== Welcome to Conference USA (1996–2004) ===
After 21 years in the Southwest Conference, the Cougars joined Conference USA in 1996. Under head coach Alvin Brooks, the basketball program had a disappointing initial season in C-USA. The team went 3–11 against C-USA teams in 1996–97. The next season was even more futile. Brooks, who had led the Cougars since 1993, coached the Cougars to a rock bottom conference record of 2–14 in 1997–98. The last, and only other, time the Cougars recorded only two conference victories in a season was in 1950–51; their first season in the Missouri Valley Conference.

One of Houston's biggest sports icons and one of the Cougars best basketball players ever, Clyde Drexler was hired to coach the program that he led as a player to the 1983 NCAA Final as part of Phi Slama Jama. Basketball excitement was back on campus, and fans looked forward to the promising years to come. After just two seasons with minimal success, Drexler resigned as head coach citing his intention to spend more time with his family.

Ray McCallum was hired to do what Clyde Drexler could not—lead the Cougars to a winning season and earn a spot in the NCAA tournament. After losing seasons in each of his first two years, McCallum guided the Cougars to an 18–15 record in 2001–02. That season, the team won two conference tournament games and qualified for the National Invitation Tournament. However, the team regressed in the following season and failed to qualify for even their own C-USA tournament.

=== Two steps forward, one step back (2004–07) ===
Tom Penders was named as the head coach of Cougars basketball in 2004. Known as "Turnaround Tom" for his reputation of inheriting sub-par basketball programs and making them better, Penders was hired to rebuild a program that recorded only one winning season in its last eight years. After a surprising debut season in 2004–05 that led to an NIT appearance, the team had high hopes to build on their relative success and make the NCAA tournament in 2006.

The 2005–06 season looked promising at the outset. The Cougars started their first game on a 30–0 scoring run against the Florida Tech Panthers. Less than two weeks later, the Cougars beat the nationally ranked LSU Tigers on the road and the Arizona Wildcats at home. The surprising wins earned the Cougars their first national ranking in several years. The team that seemed destined for an NCAA tournament berth failed to capitalize on their success and national recognition and began to stumble after a loss to South Alabama Jaguars in December. The Cougars won only one conference tournament game and had to settle again for another NIT bid.

Dubbed as "The Show," the 2006–07 Cougars entered the season with cockiness and strong expectations to finally make it into the NCAA tournament. A difficult schedule matched the Cougars with seven different teams that would end up qualifying for either the 2007 NCAA tournament or NIT. Houston lost three times to the Memphis Tigers and once each to Arizona, the Creighton Bluejays, the Kentucky Wildcats, South Alabama, the UNLV Runnin' Rebels, and the VCU Rams. By going 0–9 against these quality teams, the Cougars proved they were not worthy of an at-large bid to the NCAA tournament. Not surprisingly, two conference tournament wins against lower seeds and an unimpressive 18–15 overall record were not even enough to earn the team an invitation to the NIT.

=== Team goal: NCAA tournament (2007–10) ===
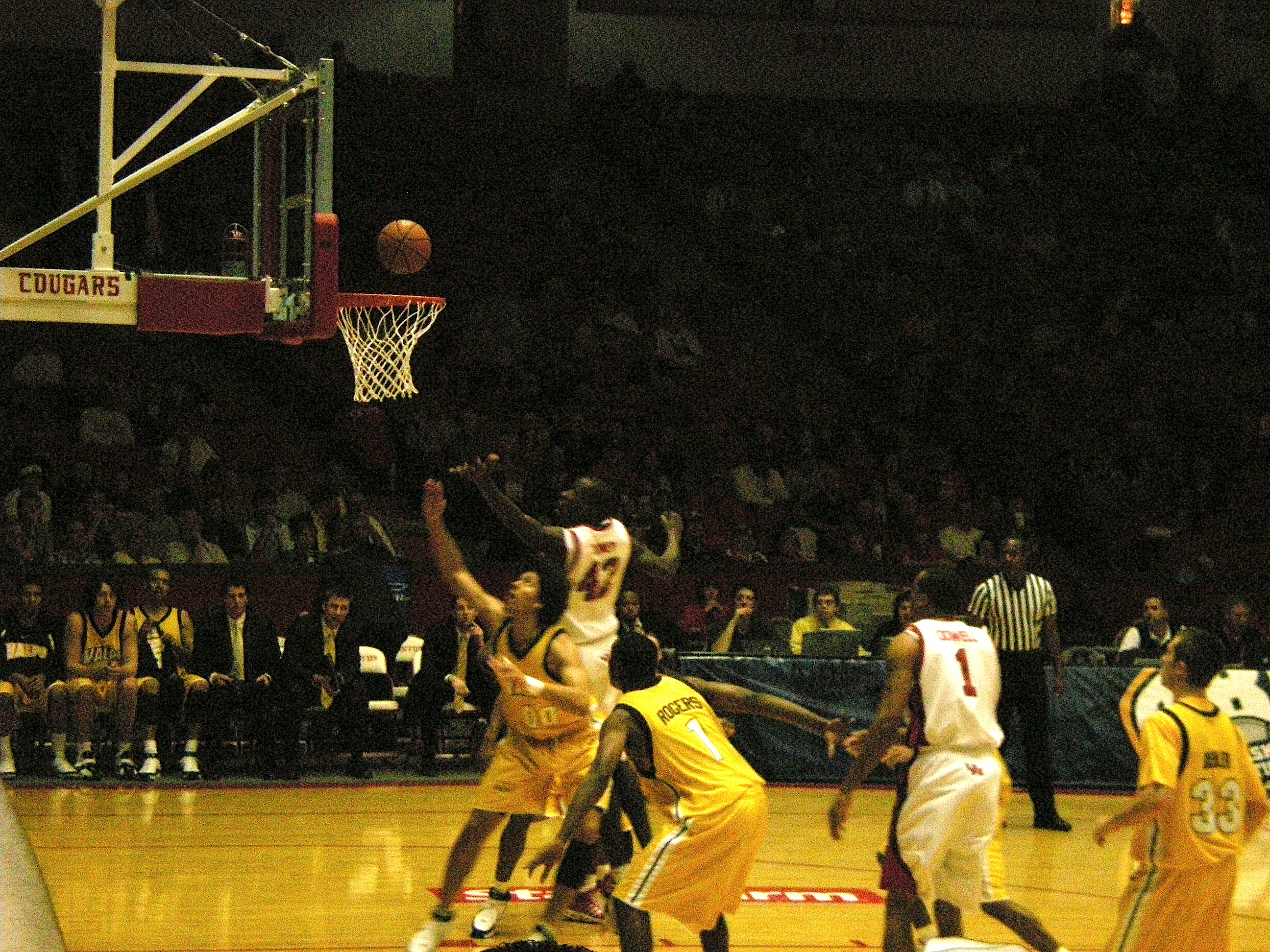
The Houston Cougars at the 2008 CBI

In 2007–08 the team introduced a new nickname ("The Show—In 3D") and a slightly new uniform (a changed trim design). The team hoped to reach the NCAA tournament for the first time since 1992. Eight straight home games from November 21 to December 29 helped the Cougars get off to an 11–1 start. However, the team lost most of its critical games at the end of the season, including their last two games (both against the UTEP Miners). Houston received an invitation to the inaugural College Basketball Invitational tournament and defeated the Nevada Wolf Pack and the Valparaiso Crusaders but lost to their conference rival, the Tulsa Golden Hurricane, in the semifinal round.

The 2008–09 season began on November 11 with a two-point loss to the Georgia Southern Eagles; this was the first game of the Division I college basketball season and the opening game of the 2K Sports Classic tournament in Durham, North Carolina. A Cougars win would have meant a second round matchup with the Duke Blue Devils. Overall, the Cougars played a balanced home and away regular season schedule. Fifteen games (three in November, three in December, four in January, three in February, and two in March) were played at Hofheinz Pavilion. There were 14 away games (two in November, two in December, five in January, and five in February).

The 2009–10 team finished the regular season 15–15 and 7–9 in C-USA, finishing seventh place in the conference. Following a 93–80 win over East Carolina in the first round of the C–USA Tournament, the Cougars beat Memphis 66–65, ending a string of four tournament titles for the Tigers. In the next game, they defeated Southern Miss 74–66 to advance to the championship game. Finally, the Cougars beat #25 ranked UTEP 81–73 to earn the conference's bid to the NCAA tournament, their first since 1992. In the first round of the NCAA tournament, Houston, seeded 13th, was defeated 89–77 by 4th-seeded Maryland.

Penders announced his resignation as Houston head coach on March 22, 2010.

The school hired James Dickey on March 21, 2010.

=== Joining the American (2013–23) ===
Beginning with the 2013–14 season, Houston joined the newly created American Athletic Conference following the Big East realignment.

In March 2014, Dickey stepped down as head coach because of "private family matters". In four seasons with Houston, Dickey amassed a 64–62 record with no NCAA tournament appearances or conference titles.

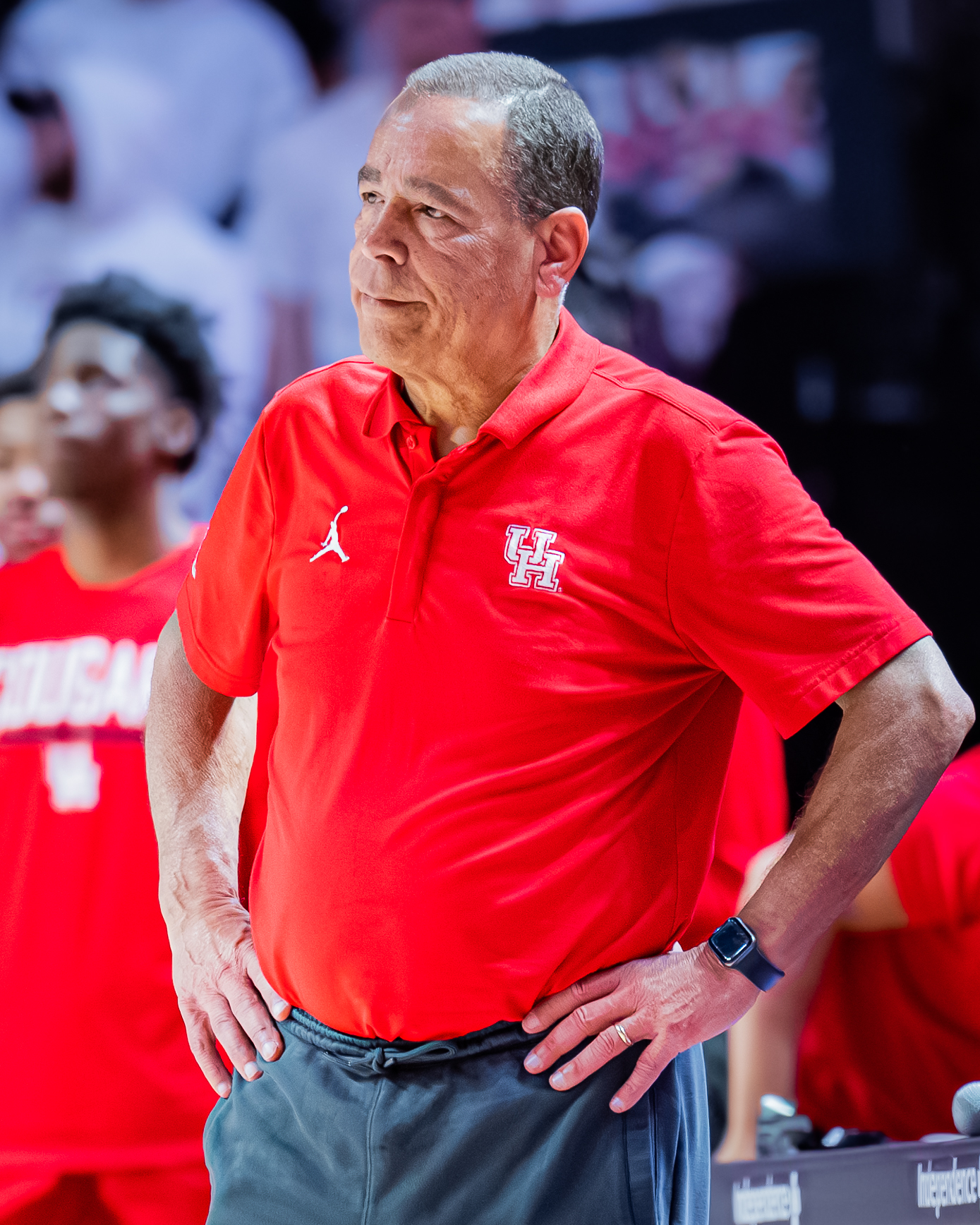
Sampson, courtside in 2023

On April 3, 2014, Houston hired Kelvin Sampson as the new Cougars head coach. Sampson had just become eligible to be a college coach again after receiving a five-year show cause penalty in 2008 for sanctions against him during his time as Indiana head coach. In 2014–15, Sampson's first season, Houston struggled again, finishing with a 13–19 record and 4–14 in the AAC.

The 2015–16 team led a resurgence, finishing 22–10 overall, 12–6 in conference, but lost in the AAC tournament and in the first round of the NIT.

In 2017–18, the Cougars compiled a 27–8 overall record, reaching the finals of the AAC tournament and winning a game in the NCAA tournament for the first time since 1984.

In 2018–19, the Cougars' success continued as they set a program record for wins with a 33–4 mark. They were AAC regular-season champions but fell in the finals of the conference tournament. They proceeded to the NCAA tournament, where they reached the Sweet Sixteen for the first time in 35 years.

In 2020–21, the Cougars were ranked as high as No. 5 in the nation. After winning the AAC Tournament, the Cougars were awarded a #2 seed in the NCAA tournament. UH defeated Cleveland State, Rutgers, Syracuse and Oregon State to achieve their first Final Four appearance since 1984. They would lose to eventual national champions Baylor in the Final Four.

During the 2021–22 season, the Cougars won the AAC regular season championship with a 15–3 conference record. They then defeated Cincinnati, Tulane and Memphis to win the conference tournament. With the conference championship, an overall record of 29–5 and ranked No. 15 in the nation, Houston received a #5 seed in the NCAA tournament. In the tournament, UH defeated UAB, Illinois and Arizona before losing to Villanova in the Elite Eight.

In 2022–23, the Cougars' last season in the AAC, the team reached the number one ranking in the AP Poll, marking the first time they had held the top spot since 1983.

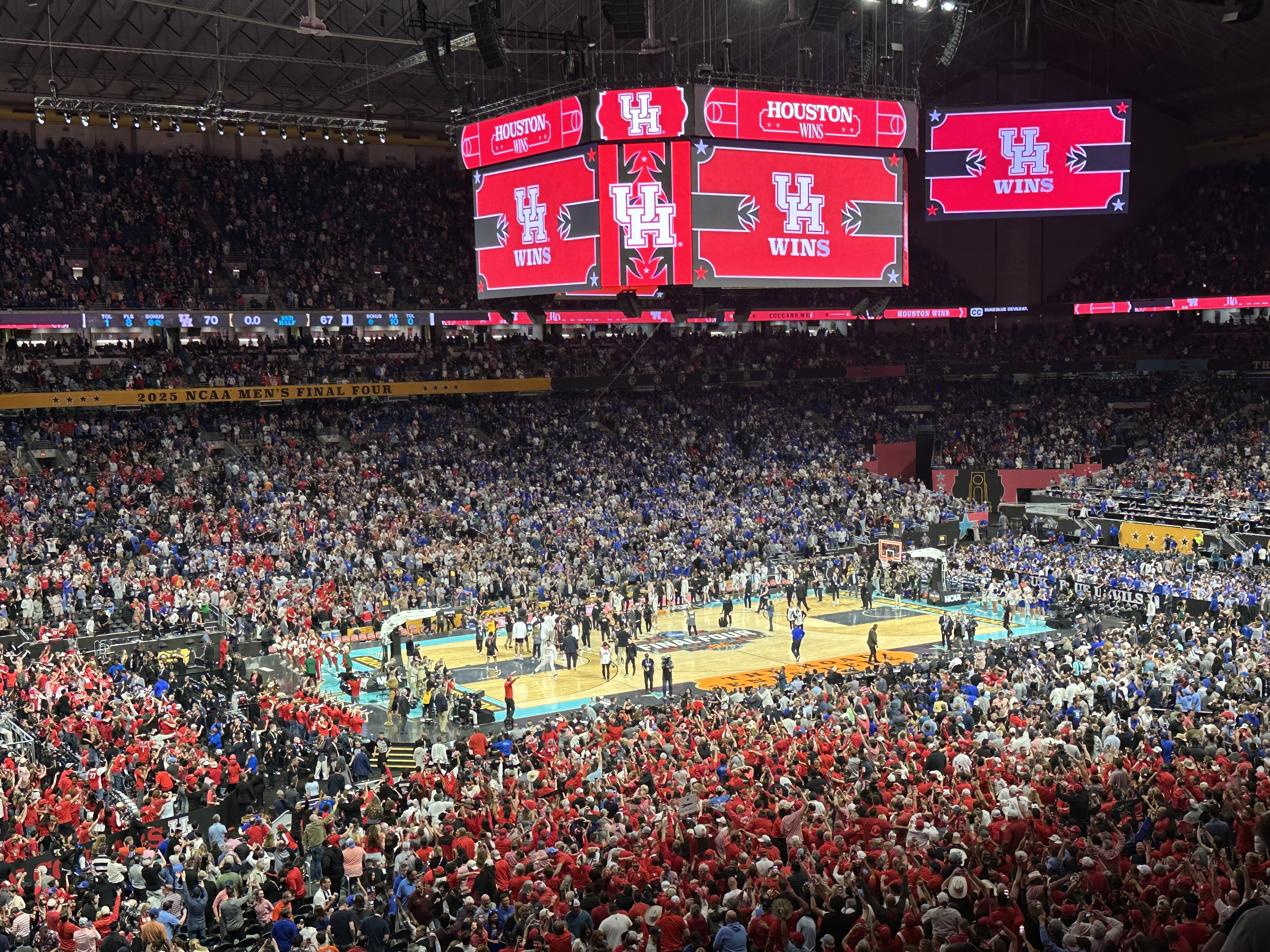
The Alamodome after Houston's 70–67 win over Duke in the 2025 Final Four in San Antonio.

=== Big 12 ===
In September 2021, the University of Houston was invited to join the Big 12 Conference, along with Cincinnati, UCF and BYU. The Cougars began Big 12 play in the 2023–24 season. In their first year of play, the Cougars went 32–5 overall, 15–3 in conference play, to claim an outright regular season title.

In the 2024–25 season, the Cougars enjoyed one of the most successful campaigns in school history. They won both the Big 12 Conference regular-season and tournament titles, earned the No. 1 seed in the NCAA tournament, and advanced to the national championship game. En route to the final, they survived close contests against Purdue in the Sweet 16 and a heavily favoured Duke Team in the national semifinal. In the championship game, the Cougars surrendered a lead of as many as 12 points before narrowly losing to Florida in the closing moments.

== Conference affiliations ==
- Lone Star Conference (1945–1949)
- Gulf Coast Conference (1949–1950)
- Missouri Valley Conference (1950–1960)
- Independent (1960–1975)
- Southwest Conference (1975–1996)
- Conference USA (1996–2013)
- American Athletic Conference (2013–2023)
- Big 12 Conference (2023–present)

== Top 25 finishes ==
The Houston Cougars have finished ranked in the AP Poll and/or the Coaches Poll 18 times in the program's history.

Season	Final record	AP Poll	Coaches Poll
1965–66	23–6		14
1966–67	27–4	7	6
1967–68	31–2	1	1
1969–70	25–5	12	11
1970–71	22–7	14	18
1972–73	23–4	13	18
1977–78	25–8		16
1982–83	31–3	1	1
1983–84	32–5	5	5
2017–18	27–8	21	22
2018–19	33–4	11	12
2019–20	23–8	22	23
2020–21	28–4	6	3
2021–22	32–6	15	7
2022–23	33–4	2	6
2023–24	32–5	3	3
2024–25	35–5	2	2
2025–26	30–7	7	6

== Rivalries ==
Rice is considered to be Houston's main rival, with the Bayou Cup trophy being awarded to the winner of the crosstown rivalry game. More recently, over the years in C-USA and the AAC, a rivalry has developed with Memphis.

Other rivals include former Southwest Conference foes Baylor, TCU, Texas, Texas A&M, and Texas Tech.

=== Rice ===
Houston leads Rice in the series 66–18 through the 2025–26 season.

=== SMU ===
Houston leads SMU in the series 58–34 through the 2025–26 season.

== Head coaches ==
Coach	Tenure	Overall record	Conference record	Conference regular season titles	Conference tournament titles	NCAA tournament appearances
Alden Pasche	1945–1956	135–116 (.538)	63–55 (.534)	4		1
Guy Lewis	1956–1986	592–279 (.680)	134–98 (.578)	2	4	14
Pat Foster	1986–1993	142–73 (.660)	70–38 (.648)	1	1	3
Alvin Brooks	1993–1998	54–84 (.391)	26–46 (.361)			
Clyde Drexler	1998–2000	19–39 (.328)	7–25 (.219)			
Ray McCallum	2000–2004	44–73 (.376)	24–40 (.375)			
Tom Penders	2004–2010	121–77 (.611)	56–38 (.596)		1	1
James Dickey	2010–2014	64–62 (.508)	26–40 (.394)			
Kelvin Sampson	2014–present	329–91 (.783)	165–52 (.760)	6	3	8
Totals		1,500–894 (.627)		13	9	27

Note: Through 2025–26 season.

== Postseason play ==
=== NCAA Division I tournament results ===
The Cougars have appeared in 27 NCAA tournaments. Their combined record is 47–32. They have made seven appearances in the Final Four of the tournament, which is the most of any team who has not won a national championship.

The NCAA began seeding the tournament with the 1978 edition.

Year	Seed	Round	Opponent	Result
1956		Regional semifinals Regional 3rd-place game	SMU; Kansas State	L 74–89; L 70–89
1961		Regional quarterfinals Regional semifinals Regional 3rd-place game	Marquette; Kansas State; Texas Tech	W 77–61; L 64–75; L 67–69
1965		Regional quarterfinals Regional semifinals Regional 3rd-place game	Notre Dame; Oklahoma State; SMU	W 99–98; L 60–75; L 87–89
1966		Regional quarterfinals Regional semifinals Regional 3rd-place game	Colorado State; Oregon State; Pacific	W 82–76; L 60–63; W 102–91
1967		Regional quarterfinals Regional semifinals Regional finals Final Four; National 3rd-place game	New Mexico State; Kansas; SMU; UCLA; North Carolina	W 59–58; W 66–53; W 83–75; L 58–73; W 84–62
1968		Regional quarterfinals Regional semifinals Regional finals Final Four; National 3rd-place game	Loyola–Chicago; Louisville; TCU; UCLA; Ohio State	W 94–76; W 91–75; W 103–68; L 69–101; L 85–89
1970		Regional quarterfinals Regional semifinals Regional 3rd-place game	Dayton; Drake; Kansas State	W 71–64; L 87–92; L 98–107
1971		Regional quarterfinals Regional semifinals Regional 3rd-place game	New Mexico State; Kansas; Notre Dame	W 72–69; L 77–78; W 119–106
1972		Regional quarterfinals	Texas	L 74–85
1973		Regional quarterfinals	Southwestern Louisiana	L 89–102
1978	(4Q)	First round	(2L) Notre Dame	L 77–100
1981	#8	First round	#9 Villanova	L 72–90
1982	#6	First round Second round Sweet Sixteen; Elite Eight; Final Four	#11 Alcorn State #3 Tulsa #2 Missouri #8 Boston College #1 North Carolina	W 94–84; W 78–74; W 79–78; W 99–92; L 63–68
1983	#1	Second round Sweet Sixteen; Elite Eight; Final Four; National Championship	#8 Maryland #4 Memphis State #3 Villanova #1 Louisville #6 NC State	W 60–50; W 70–63; W 89–71; W 94–81; L 52–54
1984	#2	Second round Sweet Sixteen; Elite Eight; Final Four; National Championship	#10 Louisiana Tech #6 Memphis State #4 Wake Forest #7 Virginia #1 Georgetown	W 77–70; W 78–71; W 68–63; W 49–47 ^{OT} L 75–84
1987	#12	First round	#5 Kansas	L 55–66
1990	#8	First round	#9 UC Santa Barbara	L 66–70
1992	#10	First round	#7 Georgia Tech	L 60–65
2010	#13	First round	#4 Maryland	L 77–89
2018	#6	First round Second round	#11 San Diego State #3 Michigan	W 67–65; L 63–64
2019	#3	First round Second round Sweet Sixteen	#14 Georgia State #11 Ohio State #2 Kentucky	W 84–55; W 74–59; L 58–62
2021	#2	First round Second round Sweet Sixteen; Elite Eight; Final Four	#15 Cleveland State #10 Rutgers #11 Syracuse #12 Oregon State #1 Baylor	W 87–56; W 63–60; W 62–46; W 67–61; L 59–78
2022	#5	First round Second round Sweet Sixteen; Elite Eight	#12 UAB #4 Illinois #1 Arizona #2 Villanova	W 82–68; W 68–53; W 72–60; L 44–50
2023	#1	First round Second round Sweet Sixteen	#16 Northern Kentucky #9 Auburn #5 Miami (FL)	W 63–52; W 81–64; L 75–89
2024	#1	First round Second round Sweet Sixteen	#16 Longwood #9 Texas A&M #4 Duke	W 86–46; W 100–95 ^{OT} L 51–54
2025	#1	First round Second round Sweet Sixteen; Elite Eight; Final Four; National Championship	#16 SIU Edwardsville #8 Gonzaga #4 Purdue #2 Tennessee #1 Duke #1 Florida	W 78–40; W 81–76; W 62–60; W 69–50; W 70–67; L 63–65
2026	#2	First round Second round Sweet Sixteen	#15 Idaho #10 Texas A&M #3 Illinois	W 78–47; W 88–57; L 55–65

=== NIT results ===
The Cougars have appeared in 11 National Invitation Tournaments (NIT). Their combined record is 5–11.

Year	Round	Opponent	Result
1962	Quarterfinals	Dayton	L 77–94
1977	First round Quarterfinals; Semifinals; Final	Indiana State; Illinois State; Alabama; St. Bonaventure	W 83–82; W 91–90; W 82–76; L 91–94
1985	First round	Lamar	L 71–78
1988	First round Second round	Fordham; Colorado State	W 69–61; L 61–71
1991	First round	Stanford	L 86–93
1993	First round	UTEP	L 61–67
2002	Opening round	Vanderbilt	L 50–59
2005	Opening round	Wichita State	L 69–85
2006	First round Second round	BYU; Missouri State	W 77–67; L 59–60
2016	First round	Georgia Tech	L 62–81
2017	First round	Akron	L 75–78

=== CBI results ===
The Cougars have appeared in the College Basketball Invitational (CBI) three times. Their combined record is 3–3.

Year	Round	Opponent	Result
2008	First round Quarterfinals; Semifinals	Nevada; Valparaiso; Tulsa	W 80–79; W 91–67; L 69–73
2009	First round	Oregon State	L 45–49
2013	First round Quarterfinals	Texas; George Mason	W 73–72; L 84–88 ^{OT}

=== NAIA tournament results ===
The Cougars have appeared in the NAIA tournament twice. Their combined record is 2–2.

Year	Round	Opponent	Result
1946	First round Second round	High Point; Indiana State	W 63–34; L 43–62
1947	First round Second round	Montana State; Arizona State–Flagstaff	W 60–58; L 42–44 ^{3OT}

== Houston Cougars in the NBA draft ==
Houston has had 52 players selected in the NBA draft.

Draft year	Round	Pick (overall)	Player	Position	Drafted by
1947	5	49	Charles Raynor	G	Baltimore Bullets
1952	9	96	Royce Ray	G	Rochester Royals
1954	10	81	Gary Shivers	C	Baltimore Bullets
1955	8	69	Don Boldebuck	C	Minneapolis Lakers
1956	6	46	Don Boldebuck	C	Boston Celtics
1956	13	70	Arthur Helms	F	St. Louis Hawks
1961	1	9	Gary Phillips	G	Boston Celtics
1961	2	15	Ted Luckenbill	F	Philadelphia Warriors
1963	3	25	Lyle Harger	F	Los Angeles Lakers
1965	14	101	Jack Morgenthal	G	Philadelphia 76ers
1967	10	105	Don Kruse	C	Los Angeles Lakers
1968	1	1	Elvin Hayes	F/C	San Diego Rockets
1968	1	12	Don Chaney	G	Boston Celtics
1969	2	20	Ken Spain	C	Chicago Bulls
1969	9	117	George Reynolds	G	Detroit Pistons
1970	11	183	Melvin Bell	F	Baltimore Bullets
1970	12	189	Ollie Taylor	G	Cleveland Cavaliers
1971	4	56	Poo Welch	G	Atlanta Hawks
1972	1	3	Dwight Davis	F	Cleveland Cavaliers
1973	1	9	Dwight Jones	F/C	Atlanta Hawks
1973	3	47	Steve Newsome	F	Chicago Bulls
1975	4	59	Louis Dunbar	F	Philadelphia 76ers
1975	5	78	Maurice Presley	C	Portland Trail Blazers
1976	5	78	Dave Marrs	F	Houston Rockets
1977	1	2	Otis Birdsong	G	Kansas City Kings
1978	5	89	Cecile Rose	G	New Jersey Nets
1978	6	128	Charles Thompson	F	Phoenix Suns
1979	4	71	Larry Rogers	F	New York Knicks
1980	9	189	Ken Williams	G	Dallas Mavericks
1982	1	19	Rob Williams	G	Denver Nuggets
1982	6	136	Lynden Rose	G	Los Angeles Lakers
1983	1	14	Clyde Drexler	G/F	Portland Trail Blazers
1983	2	29	Larry Micheaux	F	Chicago Bulls
1984	1	1	Akeem Olajuwon	C	Houston Rockets
1984	1	24	Michael Young	G/F	Boston Celtics
1984	10	208	Carl Lewis	G	Chicago Bulls
1985	5	103	Reid Gettys	G	Chicago Bulls
1986	4	80	Alvin Franklin	G	Sacramento Kings
1987	1	23	Cadillac Anderson	F/C	San Antonio Spurs
1987	2	28	Rickie Winslow	F	Chicago Bulls
1988	2	26	Rolando Ferreira	C	Portland Trail Blazers
1990	2	30	Carl Herrera	F	Miami Heat
1991	2	44	Álvaro Teherán	C	Philadelphia 76ers
1994	2	52	Anthony Goldwire	G	Phoenix Suns
2001	2	51	Alton Ford	C	Phoenix Suns
2017	2	44	Damyean Dotson	G	New York Knicks
2021	1	25	Quentin Grimes	G	Los Angeles Clippers
2023	1	8	Jarace Walker	F	Washington Wizards
2023	1	25	Marcus Sasser	G	Memphis Grizzlies
2024	2	45	Jamal Shead	G	Sacramento Kings
2026	1	8	Kingston Flemings	G	Atlanta Hawks
2026	1	27	Chris Cenac Jr.	F/C	Boston Celtics
2026	2	45	Emanuel Sharp	G	Sacramento Kings

== Individual awards ==
=== National Coach of the Year award winners ===
Associated Press College Basketball Coach of the Year

- Guy Lewis – 1968 & 1983
- Kelvin Sampson – 2024

Ben Jobe Award

- Kelvin Sampson – 2022

Henry Iba Award

- Guy Lewis – 1968
- Kelvin Sampson – 2024

NABC Coach of the Year

- Guy Lewis – 1968
- Kelvin Sampson – 2024

The Sporting News Men's College Basketball Coach of the Year Award

- Guy Lewis – 1968
- Kelvin Sampson – 2025

UPI College Basketball Coach of the Year

- Guy Lewis – 1968

=== National Player of the Year award winners ===
Associated Press College Basketball Player of the Year

- Elvin Hayes – 1968

Basketball Times Player of the Year

- Akeem Olajuwon – 1984

Helms Foundation College Basketball Player of the Year

- Akeem Olajuwon – 1983

Jerry West Award

- Marcus Sasser – 2023

Lefty Driesell Award

- Joseph Tugler – 2025

NABC Defensive Player of the Year

- Jamal Shead – 2024

Naismith Defensive Player of the Year Award

- Jamal Shead – 2024

NCAA basketball tournament Most Outstanding Player

- Akeem Olajuwon – 1983

Sporting News Men's College Basketball Player of the Year

- Elvin Hayes – 1968

UPI College Basketball Player of the Year

- Elvin Hayes – 1968

=== All-Americans ===
Houston players have been named to an All-American team 14 times.

==== Key ====
^{†}	Consensus first-team selection
^{‡}	Consensus second-team selection

AP	Associated Press	UPI	United Press International
NABC	National Association of Basketball Coaches	USBWA	United States Basketball Writers Association
SN	The Sporting News		

Year	Player	Position	Selector(s)
1961	Gary Phillips	G	USBWA (1st)
1967	Elvin Hayes†	F/C	AP (1st), USBWA (1st), NABC (1st), UPI (1st)
1968	Elvin Hayes†	F/C	AP (1st), USBWA (1st), NABC (1st), UPI (1st)
1972	Dwight Davis	F	AP (2nd)
1977	Otis Birdsong†	G	AP (2nd), USBWA (1st), NABC (1st), UPI (1st)
1981	Rob Williams	G	AP (3rd)
1983	Clyde Drexler‡	G/F	AP (2nd), USBWA (1st), UPI (3rd)
1984	Akeem Olajuwon†	C	AP (1st), USBWA (1st), NABC (1st), UPI (2nd)
1984	Michael Young	G/F	AP (3rd), NABC (3rd), UPI (3rd)
2021	Quentin Grimes	G	AP (3rd), USBWA (3rd), NABC (3rd), SN (3rd)
2023	Marcus Sasser†	G	AP (1st), USBWA (1st), NABC (1st), SN (2nd)
2024	Jamal Shead†	G	AP (1st), USBWA (1st), NABC (1st), SN (1st)
2025	LJ Cryer	G	AP (3rd), USBWA (3rd), NABC (3rd), SN (3rd)
2026	Kingston Flemings‡	G	AP (3rd), USBWA (2nd), NABC (2nd), SN (2nd)

Note: Honorable Mention selections are not included.

=== Conference Player of the Year ===
The following Houston players have been named Conference Player of the Year while at UH.

Season	Player	Position	Conference
1976–77	Otis Birdsong	G	Southwest
1980–81	Rob Williams	G	Southwest
1982–83†	Clyde Drexler	G/F	Southwest
1983–84	Akeem Olajuwon	C	Southwest
2020–21†	Quentin Grimes	G	The American
2022–23	Marcus Sasser	G	The American
2023–24	Jamal Shead	G	Big 12

† co-Player of the Year

=== Conference Coach of the Year ===
The following Houston coaches have been named Conference Coach of the Year while at UH.

Season	Coach	Conference
1955–56	Alden Pasche	Missouri Valley
1982–83	Guy Lewis	Southwest
1983–84	Guy Lewis	Southwest
1991–92	Pat Foster	Southwest
2017–18	Kelvin Sampson	The American
2018–19	Kelvin Sampson	The American
2021–22	Kelvin Sampson	The American
2022–23	Kelvin Sampson	The American
2023–24	Kelvin Sampson	Big 12
2024–25	Kelvin Sampson	Big 12

== Individual honors ==
=== Naismith Memorial Basketball Hall of Fame inductees ===
The following Houston players and coaches have been enshrined in the Naismith Memorial Basketball Hall of Fame.

Year inducted	Name	Position	Tenure	Ref.
1990	Elvin Hayes	F/C	1965–1968	
2004	Clyde Drexler	G/F	1980–1983	
2008	Hakeem Olajuwon	C	1981–1984	
2013	Guy Lewis	Coach	1953–1986	

=== Retired numbers ===
The Cougars have retired the numbers of seven men's basketball players:

Houston Cougars retired numbers
No.	Player	Pos.	Tenure	Ref.
10	Otis Birdsong	G	1973–1977	
22	Clyde Drexler	G/F	1980–1983	
24	Don Chaney	G	1965–1968	
34	Hakeem Olajuwon	C	1981–1984	
42	Dwight Davis	F	1969–1972	
42	Michael Young	G/F	1980–1984	
44	Elvin Hayes	F/C	1965–1968	

== See also ==
- Game of the Century
- Guy Lewis
- Phi Slama Jama
