= Jeppesen Gymnasium =

Former sports facility in Houston, Texas

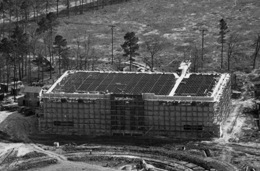
- Jeppesen Gymnasium prior to opening in 1942.
- Interactive map of Jeppesen Gymnasium
- Former names: Public School Fieldhouse (1942–1958)
- Location: Houston, Texas
- Coordinates: 29.723027°N 95.349484°W
- Owner: University of Houston
- Capacity: 2,500

Construction
- Groundbreaking: 1941
- Opened: 1942
- Demolished: March 1996
- Architect: Harry D. Payne
- General contractor: Fretz Construction Company

Tenant
- Houston Cougars men's basketball (NCAA) (1946–1966)

Jeppesen Gymnasium, also known as Jeppesen Fieldhouse, was a multi-purpose sports facility on the campus of the University of Houston in Houston, Texas. The facility was the first home to the Houston Cougars men's basketball team, and later home to the Cougars women's volleyball team. Located next to Robertson Stadium, the facility was demolished in 1996 to make room for renovations of Robertson Stadium such as the scoreboard.

== Planning and construction ==
Prior to the construction of Robertson Stadium, the University of Houston campus had been built nearby in 1939. In the summer of 1941, construction began on Jeppesen Gymnasium as part of a joint project between the Works Progress Administration and the Houston Independent School District. It was constructed simultaneously with nearby Robertson Stadium.

== Architecture and features ==
Designed by Harry D. Payne using an art deco design style, Jeppesen Gymnasium's structure consisted of two stories and a basement. It was built of reinforced concrete and steel with masonry walls. Buttresses, columns, and steel trusses supported a sound-absorbing roof. On the south end of the structure were four entrances to a lobby that led to the basketball court itself.
