= Guy Lewis =

American basketball player and coach (1922–2015)

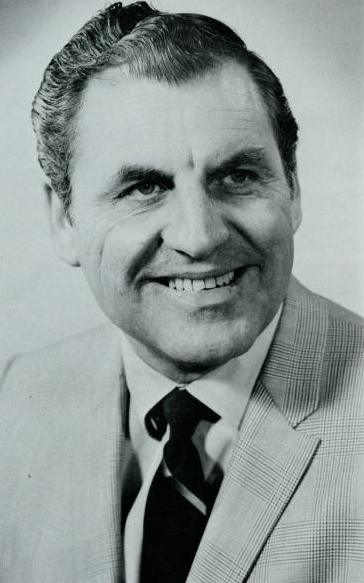
- Lewis, c. 1972

Biographical details
- Born: March 19, 1922; Arp, Texas, U.S.
- Died: November 26, 2015 (aged 93); Kyle, Texas, U.S.

Playing career
- 1945–1947: Houston
- Positions: Center, forward

Coaching career (HC unless noted)
- 1953–1956: Houston (assistant)
- 1956–1986: Houston

Head coaching record
- Overall: 592–279 (.680)
- Tournaments: 26–18 (NCAA); 3–3 (NIT)

Accomplishments and honors

Championships
- 5 NCAA regional—Final Four (1967, 1968, 1982–1984); 4 SWC tournament (1978, 1981, 1983, 1984); 2 SWC regular season (1983, 1984)

Awards
- 2× AP Coach of the Year (1968, 1983); Henry Iba Award (1968); NABC Coach of the Year (1968); Sporting News Coach of the Year (1968); UPI Coach of the Year (1968); 2× SWC Coach of the Year (1983, 1984)
- Basketball Hall of Fame; Inducted in 2013 (profile)
- College Basketball Hall of Fame; Inducted in 2007

Guy Vernon Lewis II (March 19, 1922 – November 26, 2015) was an American basketball player and coach. He served as the head men's basketball coach at the University of Houston from 1956 to 1986. Lewis led his Houston Cougars to five appearances in the Final Four of the NCAA tournament, in 1967, 1968, 1982, 1983, and 1984. His 1980s teams, nicknamed Phi Slama Jama for their slam dunks, were runners-up for the national championship in back-to-back seasons in 1983 and 1984. He was inducted into National Collegiate Basketball Hall of Fame in 2007 and the Naismith Memorial Basketball Hall of Fame in 2013.

== Coaching career ==
Born in Arp, Texas, Lewis was on the basketball and football teams of Arp High School. Lewis served as an Army Air Corps flight instructor in World War II. After serving in World War II, Lewis enrolled at the University of Houston on the GI Bill. He played center and forward on Houston's first varsity basketball team, graduating in 1947. In 1953, he returned to UH as an assistant coach, succeeding Alden Pasche as head coach in 1956. As a coach, he was known for championing the once-outlawed dunk, which he characterized as a "high percentage shot," and for clutching a brightly colored red-and-white polka dot towel on the bench during games. Lewis was a major force in the racial integration of college athletics in the South during the 1960s, being one of the first major college coaches in the region to actively recruit African American athletes. In 1964, his recruitment of the program's first African-American players, Elvin Hayes and Don Chaney, ushered in an era of tremendous success in Cougar basketball. The dominant play of Hayes led the Cougars to two Final Fours during the 1960s and sent shock waves through Southern colleges that realized that they would have to begin recruiting black players if they wanted to compete with integrated teams.

Lewis led the Houston Cougars program to 27 straight winning seasons, 14 seasons with 20 or more wins, and 14 trips to the NCAA tournament. His Houston teams advanced to the Final Four on five occasions (1967, 1968, 1982, 1983, 1984) and twice advanced to the national championship game (1983, 1984). Standout players Lewis coached during his tenure at Houston included Hayes, Chaney, Hakeem Olajuwon, Clyde Drexler, Otis Birdsong, Dwight Jones, Louis Dunbar, Dwight Davis, and Ken Spain.

Lewis's Houston teams played a key role in two watershed events that helped to popularize college basketball as a spectator sport. In January 1968, his underdog Cougars, led by Hayes, upset John Wooden's undefeated and top-ranked UCLA Bruins 71–69 in front of 52,693 fans at the Houston Astrodome. This was the first nationally televised regular season college basketball game and subsequently became known as the "Game of the Century." It marked a turning point in the emerging popularity of college basketball. In the early 1980s, Lewis's Phi Slama Jama teams at UH gained notoriety for their fast-breaking, "above the rim" style of play as well as their overall success. At the height of Phi Slama Jama's notoriety, they advanced all the way to the national championship game in 1983 and 1984, along the way notching consecutive 30-win seasons. In the first of those appearances, in 1983, the Cougars suffered a dramatic, last-second loss to underdog North Carolina State in the 1983 NCAA Final that became an iconic moment in the history of the sport, one that solidified the NCAA basketball tournament in the cultural firmament as March Madness. Lewis's insistence that his teams play an acrobatic, up-tempo brand of basketball that emphasized dunking brought this style of play to the fore and helped popularize it amongst younger players.

The Cougars also lost in the 1984 NCAA Final to the Georgetown Hoyas led by Patrick Ewing. On January 21, 1986, Lewis announced that he would retire from coaching after the end of the 1985–86 season. When asked who he would suggest to replace him, he suggested long-time assistant Donnie Schverak; the team replaced Lewis with Pat Foster. Lewis retired at number 20 in all-time NCAA Division I victories, his 592–279 record giving him a .680 career winning percentage. In 1995, the University of Houston named the playing surface at Hofheinz Pavilion (now the Fertitta Center) "Guy V. Lewis Court" in Lewis' honor.

== Later life and honors ==
Lewis was hospitalized for a stroke on February 27, 2002. He later recovered, but experienced some lasting effects from the episode. From 1959 until his death, Lewis resided in the University Oaks subdivision adjacent to the University of Houston. Lewis was the honoree at the 2012 Houston Aphasia Recovery Center luncheon benefit.

Lewis died on the morning of November 26, 2015 at a retirement facility in Kyle, Texas, at the age of 93.

== Head coaching record ==
Record table
Season	Team	Overall	Conference	Standing	Postseason
Houston Cougars (Missouri Valley Conference) (1956–1960)
1956–57	Houston	10–16	5–9	T–5th	
1957–58	Houston	9–16	4–10	T–6th	
1958–59	Houston	12–14	6–8	5th	
1959–60	Houston	13–12	6–8	T–4th	
Houston Cougars (NCAA University Division / Division I Independent) (1960–1975)
1960–61	Houston	17–11			NCAA University Division Regional Semifinals
1961–62	Houston	21–6			NIT Quarterfinals
1962–63	Houston	15–11			
1963–64	Houston	16–10			
1964–65	Houston	19–10			NCAA University Division Regional Semifinals
1965–66	Houston	23–6			NCAA University Division Regional Semifinals
1966–67	Houston	27–4			NCAA University Division Third Place
1967–68	Houston	31–2			NCAA University Division Fourth Place
1968–69	Houston	16–10			
1969–70	Houston	25–5			NCAA University Division Regional Semifinals
1970–71	Houston	22–7			NCAA University Division Regional Semifinals
1971–72	Houston	20–7			NCAA University Division First Round
1972–73	Houston	23–4			NCAA University Division First Round
1973–74	Houston	17–9			
1974–75	Houston	16–10			
Houston Cougars (Southwest Conference) (1975–1986)
1975–76	Houston	17–11	7–9	6th	
1976–77	Houston	29–8	13–3	2nd	NIT Runner-up
1977–78	Houston	25–8	11–5	3rd	NCAA Division I First Round
1978–79	Houston	16–15	6–10	T–5th	
1979–80	Houston	14–14	8–8	T–4th	
1980–81	Houston	21–9	10–6	T–2nd	NCAA Division I First Round
1981–82	Houston	25–8	11–5	2nd	NCAA Division I Final Four
1982–83	Houston	31–3	16–0	1st	NCAA Division I Runner-up
1983–84	Houston	32–5	15–1	1st	NCAA Division I Runner-up
1984–85	Houston	16–14	8–8	T–5th	NIT First Round
1985–86	Houston	14–14	8–8	6th	
Houston:		592–279 (.680)	134–98 (.578)		
Total:		592–279 (.680)			
National champion Postseason invitational champion Conference regular season champion Conference regular season and conference tournament champion Division regular season champion Division regular season and conference tournament champion Conference tournament champion

== See also ==
- List of NCAA Division I men's basketball tournament Final Four appearances by coach
