= 1946 NAIA basketball tournament =

College basketball tournament

1946 NAIA men's basketball tournament
- Teams: 32
- Finals site: Municipal Auditorium; Kansas City, Missouri
- Champions: Southern Illinois (1st title, 1st title game, 2nd Final Four)
- Runner-up: Indiana State (1st title game, 1st Final Four)
- Semifinalists: Pepperdine (2nd Final Four); Loyola New Orleans (2nd Final Four)
- MVP: Gene Stotlar (Southern Illinois)

The 1946 NAIA basketball tournament was held in March at Municipal Auditorium in Kansas City, Missouri. The 9th annual NAIA basketball tournament featured 32 teams playing in a single-elimination format.

The championship game was won by Southern Illinois when the Salukis defeated the Indiana State Sycamores, 49-40.

Central Missouri State, the original National Champions, and first back-to-back National Champions, played in their final NAIA tournament, although they remained an NAIA member for another decade, leaving in the mid 1950s to join the NCAA. The Mules appeared seven tournaments recording an overall record of 13 wins and 6 losses. The Mules won two National Championships in 1937 and 1938 and finishing in 4th place in 1942.

== Awards and honors ==
Many of the records set by the 1945 tournament have been broken, and many of the awards were established much later:

- Leading scorer est. 1963
- Leading rebounder est. 1963
- Charles Stevenson Hustle Award est. 1958
- Coach of the Year est. 1954
- Player of the Year est. 1994.

== Bracket ==
First round	Second round
Loyola New Orleans	76
Hastings	48
Loyola New Orleans	60*
Arizona State-Flagstaff	56
Arizona State-Flagstaff	45
Rockhurst	37
TOP TIER
Drury	51
Eastern Kentucky	47
Drury	55
Augsburg	47
Augsburg	64
Washburn	36
Southern Illinois	49
Central Missouri State	39
Southern Illinois	58
Loras	55
Loras	57
Panzer	43
TOP TIER
West Texas State	71
Eau Claire State	47
West Texas State	46
Nevada	60
Nevada	56
Morningside	40
Pepperdine	63
Arkansas State Teachers	37
Pepperdine	64
Iowa State Teachers	22
Iowa State Teachers	58
Montana State	42
BOTTOM TIER
Eastern Washington State	66
Louisiana Tech	44
Eastern Washington State	45
Southeastern State	37
Southeastern State (OK)	50
Peru State	36
Houston	63
High Point	34
Indiana State	62
Houston	43
Indiana State	62
St. Cloud State	51
BOTTOM TIER
Culver–Stockton	55
Wichita State	51
Culver-Stockton	40
Dakota Wesleyan	41
Dakota Wesleyan	39
New Mexico Mines	36

Elite Eight
Loyola New Orleans	54
Drury	43
Southern Illinois	66
Nevada	58
Pepperdine	46
Eastern Washington State	42
Indiana State	55
Dakota Wesleyan	34

NAIA national semifinals
Loyola New Orleans	37
Southern Illinois	53
Indiana State	56
Pepperdine	43

NAIA national championship
Southern Illinois	49
Indiana State	40
NAIA Third-place game
Pepperdine	82
Loyola New Orleans	55

- * denotes overtime.

== See also ==
- 1946 NCAA basketball tournament
- 1946 National Invitation Tournament
