= 1947 NAIA basketball tournament =

College basketball tournament

1947 NAIA men's basketball tournament
- Teams: 32
- Finals site: Municipal Auditorium, Kansas City, Missouri
- Champions: Marshall (1st title, 1st title game, 1st Final Four)
- Runner-up: Mankato State (1st title game, 1st Final Four)
- Semifinalists: Arizona State-Flagstaff (1st Final Four); Emporia State (1st Final Four)
- MVP: Irvin Leifer (Eastern Washington)

The 1947 NAIA National Tournament was held in March at Municipal Auditorium in Kansas City, Missouri. The 10th annual men's basketball tournament of what is now the National Association of Intercollegiate Athletics (NAIA) featured 32 teams playing in a single-elimination format.

It would be the first time since 1945 the NAIA Semifinalist would feature four new teams. Becoming the 3rd tournament to do so, and a feat that would not be repeated until 1965.

The championship game featured Marshall defeating Mankato State, 73–59. The third place game featured Arizona State-Flagstaff, now Northern Arizona, defeating Emporia State, 47–38.

1947 kicked off the "golden age" of NAIA National Tournaments. Harold Haskins became the first of 16 all-time leading scorers. Coach John Wooden withdrew Indiana State from the tournament because the NAIB would not allow black student-athlete Clarence Walker to play. The NAIB changed in time for Walker to play for Indiana in the 1948 tournament.

== Awards and honors ==
Many of the records set by the 1947 tournament have been broken, and many of the awards were established much later:

- Leading scorer est. 1963
- Leading rebounder est. 1963
- Charles Stevenson Hustle Award est. 1958
- Coach of the Year est. 1954
- Player of the Year est. 1994
- Top single-game scoring performances: 2nd by Nate DeLong, Wisconsin-River Falls vs. Marshall (W.Va.). Delong scored 22 field goals had 12 free throws totaling 56 points.
- All-time scoring leader; first appearance: Harold Haskins, 12th, Hamline (Minn.) (1947,48,49,50), 14 games, 104 field goals, 72 free throws, 280 total points, 20.0 average per game.

== Bracket ==
First round March 11, 1947	Second round March 12, 1947
Beloit	75
Arkansas State	60
Beloit	63
Texas Wesleyan	53
Texas Wesleyan	84
Linfield	50
TOP TIER
Canterbury (IN)	68
Western Carolina	55
Canterbury	48
Emporia State	60
Emporia State	78
Lawrence Tech	54
Dakota Wesleyan	44
Southern Illinois	39
Dakota Wesleyan	48
Eastern Washington State	62
Eastern Washington State	51
Culver–Stockton	48
TOP TIER
Hamline	71
New Mexico	49
Hamline	54
Marshall	55
Marshall	113
River Falls State	80
Whittier	70
Northwestern State (LA)	56
Whittier	49
NE Missouri State	51
NE Missouri State	76
Delta State	58
BOTTOM TIER
Arizona State-Flagstaff	49
Youngstown	45*
Arizona State-Flagstaff	44
Houston	42***
Houston	60
Montana State	58
Hastings	53
Loyola Maryland	44
Hastings	42
Southeastern State	48
Southeastern State (OK)	53
Eastern Illinois State	42
BOTTOM TIER
Mankato State	71
Loras	63
Mankato State	65
DePauw	54
DePauw	82
Oglethorpe	30

Elite Eight
Beloit	52
Emporia State	55
Eastern Washington State	48
Marshall	56
Arizona State-Flagstaff	59
NE Missouri State	55
Southeastern State	44
Mankato State	50

NAIA national semifinals
Emporia State	55
Marshall	56*
Arizona State-Flagstaff	46
Mankato State	52

NAIA national championship
Marshall	73
Mankato State	59
NAIA third-place game
Arizona State-Flagstaff	47
Emporia State	38

- * denotes overtime.

== See also ==
- 1947 NCAA basketball tournament
- 1947 National Invitation Tournament
