= SMU Mustangs men's basketball statistical leaders =

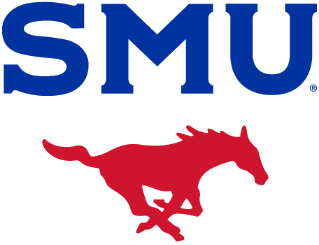

The SMU Mustangs men's basketball statistical leaders are individual statistical leaders of the SMU Mustangs men's basketball program in various categories, including points, assists, blocks, rebounds, and steals. Within those areas, the lists identify single-game, single-season, and career leaders. As of the next college basketball season in 2024–25, the Mustangs represent Southern Methodist University in the NCAA Division I Atlantic Coast Conference.

SMU began competing in intercollegiate basketball in 1916. However, the school's record book does not generally list records from before the 1950s, as records from before this period are often incomplete and inconsistent. Since scoring was much lower in this era, and teams played much fewer games during a typical season, it is likely that few or no players from this era would appear on these lists anyway.

The NCAA did not officially record assists as a stat until the 1983–84 season, and blocks and steals until the 1985–86 season, but SMU's record books includes players in these stats before these seasons. These lists are updated through the end of the 2020–21 season.

== Scoring ==
Career
Rk	Player	Points	Seasons
1	Jeryl Sasser	1992	1997–98 1998–99 1999–00 2000–01
2	Gene Phillips	1932	1968–69 1969–70 1970–71
3	Jon Koncak	1784	1981–82 1982–83 1983–84 1984–85
4	Quinton Ross	1761	1999–00 2000–01 2001–02 2002–03
5	Jim Krebs	1753	1954–55 1955–56 1956–57
6	Ira Terrell	1715	1972–73 1973–74 1975–76
7	Larry Davis	1665	1981–82 1982–83 1983–84 1984–85
8	Bryan Hopkins	1660	2002–03 2003–04 2004–05 2005–06
9	Mike Wilson	1529	1990–91 1991–92 1992–93
10	Damon Hancock	1482	1998–99 1999–00 2000–01 2001–02

Season
Rk	Player	Points	Season
1	Gene Phillips	737	1970–71
2	Gene Phillips	685	1969–70
3	Semi Ojeleye	665	2016–17
4	Papa Dia	639	2010–11
5	Ira Terrell	634	1975–76
6	Boopie Miller	629	2025–26
7	Jim Krebs	624	1956–57
8	Kendric Davis	622	2021–22
9	Quinton Ross	608	2002–03
10	Jaron Pierre Jr.	599	2025–26

Single game
Rk	Player	Points	Season	Opponent
1	Gene Phillips	51	1970–71	Texas
2	Jim Krebs	50	1955–56	Texas
3	Gene Phillips	44	1970–71	Texas A&M
	Gene Phillips	44	1970–71	Creighton
5	Jeryl Sasser	39	2000–01	UTEP
	Gene Phillips	39	1969–70	Vanderbilt
	Gene Phillips	39	1970–71	McMurry
	Gene Phillips	39	1969–70	Oklahoma City
9	Mike Wilson	37	1992–93	Texas
	Ira Terrell	37	1973–74	Texas

== Rebounds ==
Career
Rk	Player	Rebounds	Seasons
1	Jon Koncak	1169	1981–82 1982–83 1983–84 1984–85
2	Ira Terrell	1077	1972–73 1973–74 1975–76
3	Jeryl Sasser	976	1997–98 1998–99 1999–00 2000–01
4	Papa Dia	911	2007–08 2008–09 2009–10 2010–11
5	Larry Davis	889	1981–82 1982–83 1983–84 1984–85
6	Jim Krebs	840	1954–55 1955–56 1956–57
7	Willie Davis	790	1997–98 1998–99 1999–00 2000–01
8	Jeff Swanson	785	1974–75 1975–76 1976–77 1977–78
9	Ben Moore	780	2013–14 2014–15 2015–16 2016–17
10	Patrick Simpson	759	2001–02 2002–03 2003–04 2004–05

Season
Rk	Player	Rebounds	Season
1	Jon Koncak	378	1983–84
2	Ira Terrell	374	1975–76
3	Jon Koncak	354	1984–85
4	Ira Terrell	352	1972–73
5	Ira Terrell	351	1973–74
6	Papa Dia	335	2010–11
7	Jim Krebs	313	1956–57
8	Jim Krebs	299	1955–56
9	Ruben Triplett	292	1971–72
10	Jon Koncak	282	1982–83

Single game
Rk	Player	Rebounds	Season	Opponent
1	Ira Terrell	26	1975–76	New Mexico State
2	Ira Terrell	24	1975–76	TCU
3	Ira Terrell	23	1972–73	Texas A&M
	Jordan Tolbert	23	2015–16	Nicholls
5	Gene Elmore	22	1963–64	Rice
	Carroll Hooser	22	1964–65	Houston
	Ira Terrell	22	1973–74	Dallas Baptist
	Rusty Bourquein	22	1974–75	Pan American
9	Joel Krog	21	1955–56	Kansas
	Joel Krog	21	1954–55	Texas A&M
	Jim Krebs	21	1955–56	Texas A&M
	Ira Terrell	21	1972–73	Arkansas
	Jeff Swanson	21	1974–75	Texas
	Jon Koncak	21	1984–85	Texas Southern
	Jon Koncak	21	1984–85	Houston
	Papa Dia	21	2010–11	Northern Iowa

== Assists ==
Career
Rk	Player	Assists	Seasons
1	Butch Moore	828	1982–83 1983–84 1984–85 1985–86
2	Nic Moore	508	2013–14 2014–15 2015–16
3	Gerald Lewis	491	1989–90 1990–91 1991–92 1992–93
4	Jeryl Sasser	469	1997–98 1998–99 1999–00 2000–01
5	Billy Allen	468	1978–79 1979–80
6	Carl Wright	460	1982–83 1983–84 1984–85
7	Kendric Davis	445	2019–20 2020–21 2021–22
8	Roderick Hampton	419	1987–88 1988–89 1989–90 1990–91
9	Kato Armstrong	403	1985–86 1986–87 1987–88 1988–89
10	Bryan Hopkins	396	2002–03 2003–04 2004–05 2005–06

Season
Rk	Player	Assists	Season
1	Billy Allen	255	1979–80
2	Butch Moore	247	1984–85
3	Butch Moore	222	1985–86
4	Billy Allen	213	1978–79
5	Boopie Miller	211	2025–26
6	Kato Armstrong	209	1987–88
7	Michael Jaccar	206	1975–76
8	Carl Wright	203	1983–84
9	Butch Moore	192	1982–83
10	Nic Moore	181	2013–14

Single game
Rk	Player	Assists	Season	Opponent
1	Gerald Lewis	17	1992–93	Texas
2	Gerald Lewis	15	1992–93	Texas A&M
	Butch Moore	15	1982–83	Penn State
	Billy Allen	15	1979–80	Baylor
	Billy Allen	15	1979–80	Kansas
	Billy Allen	15	1978–79	Texas Wesleyan
	Michael Jaccar	15	1975–76	Houston
8	Kendric Davis	14	2020–21	Cincinnati
	Carl Wright	14	1983–84	Miami (OH)

== Steals ==
Career
Rk	Player	Steals	Seasons
1	Bryan Hopkins	225	2002–03 2003–04 2004–05 2005–06
2	Gerald Lewis	209	1989–90 1990–91 1991–92 1992–93
3	Carl Wright	205	1982–83 1983–84 1984–85
4	Jeryl Sasser	197	1997–98 1998–99 1999–00 2000–01
5	BJ Edwards	180	2023–24 2024–25 2025–26
6	Stephen Woods	179	1996–97 1997–98 1998–99 1999–00
7	Willie Davis	160	1997–98 1998–99 1999–00 2000–01
8	Zhuric Phelps	158	2021–22 2022–23 2023–24
9	Quinton Ross	153	1999–00 2000–01 2001–02 2002–03
10	Jon Killen	144	2004–05 2005–06 2006–07 2007–08

Season
Rk	Player	Steals	Season
1	B.J. Edwards	83	2024–25
2	Gerald Lewis	79	1992–93
3	Carl Wright	77	1983–84
4	Carl Wright	76	1984–85
5	Zhuric Phelps	68	2022–23
6	Willie Davis	67	1999–00
7	BJ Edwards	65	2025–26
8	Gerald Lewis	63	1991–92
	Zhuric Phelps	63	2023–24
10	Bryan Hopkins	61	2002–03
	Carlton McKinney	61	1987–88

Single game
Rk	Player	Steals	Season	Opponent
1	B.J. Edwards	10	2025–26	Arkansas State
2	Bryan Hopkins	9	2004–05	San Jose State
3	Willie Davis	8	1999–00	Tulsa
4	Jeryl Sasser	7	2000–01	UT-Pan Am
	Bobby Dimson	7	1997–98	Tulsa
	Stephen Woods	7	1996–97	Prairie View A&M
	Gerald Lewis	7	1992–93	Houston
	Gerald Lewis	7	1992–93	Rice
	Gerald Lewis	7	1991–92	Baylor
	Nic Moore	7	2014–15	Texas Southern
	Zhuric Phelps	7	2022–23	Wichita State
	Boopie Miller	7	2025–26	Arkansas State

== Blocks ==
Career
Rk	Player	Blocks	Seasons
1	Jon Koncak	278	1981–82 1982–83 1983–84 1984–85
2	Bamba Fall	245	2005–06 2006–07 2007–08 2008–09
3	Ira Terrell	169	1972–73 1973–74 1975–76
4	Patrick Simpson	151	2001–02 2002–03 2003–04 2004–05
5	Papa Dia	143	2007–08 2008–09 2009–10 2010–11
6	Cannen Cunningham	131	2011–12 2012–13 2013–14 2014–15
7	Reggie Franklin	129	1977–78 1978–79
8	Ben Moore	125	2013–14 2014–15 2015–16 2016–17
9	Markus Kennedy	97	2013–14 2014–15 2015–16
10	James Gatewood	88	1990–91 1991–92 1992–93 1993–94

Season
Rk	Player	Blocks	Season
1	Jon Koncak	97	1983–84
2	Jon Koncak	91	1984–85
3	Ira Terrell	79	1975–76
4	Papa Dia	78	2010–11
5	Reggie Franklin	70	1978–79
6	Bamba Fall	67	2008–09
7	Bamba Fall	63	2007–08
8	Bamba Fall	62	2006–07
9	Reggie Franklin	59	1977–78
	Cannen Cunningham	59	2012–13

Single game
Rk	Player	Blocks	Season	Opponent
1	Yanick Moreira	9	2014–15	Midwestern State
2	Ira Terrell	8	1975–76	East Texas State
	Jon Koncak	8	1983–84	Texas A&M
4	Ira Terrell	7	1975–76	North Texas
	Jon Koncak	7	1983–84	Miami (OH)
	Jon Koncak	7	1984–85	Oklahoma State
	Nigel Smith	7	1998–99	Navy
	Papa Dia	7	2010–11	Houston
	Michael Weathers	7	2021–22	Tulsa
