= List of SMU Mustangs men's basketball seasons =

This is a list of seasons completed by the SMU Mustangs men's basketball team.

== Season-by-season results ==
Statistics overview
Season	Coach	Overall	Conference	Standing	Postseason
Dale Morrison (Texas Intercollegiate Athletic Conference) (1916–1917)
1916–17	Dale Morrison	12–2	4–1	1st	
Burton Rix (Texas Intercollegiate Athletic Conference) (1917–1918)
1917–18	Burton Rix	5–4			
Burton Rix (Southwest Conference) (1918–1921)
1918–19	Burton Rix	7–8	5–6	3rd	
1919–20	Burton Rix	6–11	2–8	5th	
1920–21	Burton Rix	6–13	0–11	5th	
R.N. Blackwell (Southwest Conference) (1921–1922)
1921–22	R.N. Blackwell	8–14	4–11	4th	
H.A. Faulkner (Southwest Conference) (1922–1924)
1922–23	H.A. Faulkner	10–11	4–10	6th	
1923–24	H.A. Faulkner	9–15	7–15	5th	
Jimmie W. St. Clair (Southwest Conference) (1924–1938)
1924–25	Jimmie W. St. Clair	5–11	4–10	6th	
1925–26	Jimmie W. St. Clair	10–6	8–4	2nd	
1926–27	Jimmie W. St. Clair	12–5	7–4	T–2nd	
1927–28	Jimmie W. St. Clair	14–3	10–2	2nd	
1928–29	Jimmie W. St. Clair	7–9	6–6	3rd	
1929–30	Jimmie W. St. Clair	8–10	6–6	3rd	
1930–31	Jimmie W. St. Clair	15–8	8–4	2nd	
1931–32	Jimmie W. St. Clair	9–13	2–10	7th	
1932–33	Jimmie W. St. Clair	9–9	5–7	5th	
1933–34	Jimmie W. St. Clair	11–9	5–7	6th	
1934–35	Jimmie W. St. Clair	14–3	9–3	T–1st	
1935–36	Jimmie W. St. Clair	4–8	4–8	5th	
1936–37	Jimmie W. St. Clair	13–8	10–2	1st	
1937–38	Jimmie W. St. Clair	9–6	8–4	3rd	
Forrest C. Baccus (Southwest Conference) (1938–1942)
1938–39	Forrest C. Baccus	14–8	8–4	3rd	
1939–40	Forrest C. Baccus	7–13	5–7	T–5th	
1940–41	Forrest C. Baccus	10–10	6–6	T–4th	
1941–42	Forrest C. Baccus	3–16	1–11	7th	
James Stewart (Southwest Conference) (1942–1944)
1942–43	James Stewart	10–8	4–8	T−5th	
1943–44	James Stewart	8–9	6–6	T−3rd	
Roy Dale Baccus (Southwest Conference) (1944–1947)
1944–45	Roy Dale Baccus	11–10	7–5	T−3rd	
1945–46	Forrest C. Baccus	7–16	0–12	7th	
1946–47	Forrest C. Baccus	14–8	8–4	T−2nd	
Doc Hayes (Southwest Conference) (1947–1967)
1947–48	Doc Hayes	13–10	5–7	5th	
1948–49	Doc Hayes	11–13	5–7	5th	
1949–50	Doc Hayes	10–13	7–5	3rd	
1950–51	Doc Hayes	14–10	6–6	5th	
1951–52	Doc Hayes	11–13	5–7	T–3rd	
1952–53	Doc Hayes	8–12	4–8	T–5th	
1953–54	Doc Hayes	13–9	6–6	T–3rd	
1954–55	Doc Hayes	15–11	9–3	1st	NCAA Sweet Sixteen
1955–56	Doc Hayes	26–4	12–0	1st	NCAA Final Four
1956–57	Doc Hayes	22–4	11–1	1st	NCAA University Division Sweet Sixteen
1957–58	Doc Hayes	15–10	9–5	T–1st	
1958–59	Doc Hayes	16–8	10–4	2nd	
1959–60	Doc Hayes	17–7	10–4	T–2nd	
1960–61	Doc Hayes	12–12	6–8	6th	
1961–62	Doc Hayes	18–7	11–3	T–1st	
1962–63	Doc Hayes	12–12	6–8	T–5th	
1963–64	Doc Hayes	12–12	8–6	T–3rd	
1964–65	Doc Hayes	17–10	10–4	T–1st	NCAA University Division Sweet Sixteen
1965–66	Doc Hayes	17–9	11–3	1st	NCAA University Division Sweet Sixteen
1966–67	Doc Hayes	20–6	12–2	1st	NCAA University Division Elite Eight
Bob Prewitt (Southwest Conference) (1967–1975)
1967–68	Bob Prewitt	6–18	5–9	T–7th	
1968–69	Bob Prewitt	12–12	8–6	3rd	
1969–70	Bob Prewitt	5–19	4–10	7th	
1970–71	Bob Prewitt	16–10	8–6	4th	
1971–72	Bob Prewitt	16–11	10–4	T–1st	
1972–73	Bob Prewitt	10–15	7–7	T–5th	
1973–74	Bob Prewitt	15–12	10–4	T–2nd	
1974–75	Bob Prewitt	8–18	4–10	T–6th	
Sonny Allen (Southwest Conference) (1975–1980)
1975–76	Sonny Allen	16–12	10–6	3rd	
1976–77	Sonny Allen	8–19	7–9	6th	
1977–78	Sonny Allen	10–18	6–10	6th	
1978–79	Sonny Allen	11–16	6–10	T–6th	
1979–80	Sonny Allen	16–12	7–9	6th	
Dave Bliss (Southwest Conference) (1980–1988)
1980–81	Dave Bliss	7–20	3–13	9th	
1981–82	Dave Bliss	6–21	1–15	9th	
1982–83	Dave Bliss	19–11	9–7	T–4th	
1983–84	Dave Bliss	25–8	12–4	3rd	NCAA Division I Second Round
1984–85	Dave Bliss	23–10	10–6	T–2nd	NCAA Division I Second Round
1985–86	Dave Bliss	18–11	10–6	4th	NIT First Round
1986–87	Dave Bliss	16–13	7–9	T–6th	
1987–88	Dave Bliss	28–7	12–4	1st	NCAA Division I Second Round
John Shumate (Southwest Conference) (1988–1995)
1988–89	John Shumate	13–16	7–9	7th	
1989–90	John Shumate	10–18	5–11	8th	
1990–91	John Shumate	12–17	6–10	6th	
1991–92	John Shumate	10–18	4–10	7th	
1992–93	John Shumate	20–8	12–2	1st	NCAA Division I First Round
1993–94	John Shumate	6–21	3–11	7th	
1994–95	John Shumate	7–20	3–11	7th	
Mike Dement (Southwest Conference) (1996–2004)
1995–96	Mike Dement	8–20	3–11	T–7th	
Mike Dement (Western Athletic Conference) (1996–2004)
1996–97	Mike Dement	16–12	7–9	T–4th (Mountain)	
1997–98	Mike Dement	18–10	6–8	5th (Pacific)	
1998–99	Mike Dement	15–15	7–7	T–4th (Mountain)	
1999–00	Mike Dement	21–9	9–5	3rd	NIT First Round
2000–01	Mike Dement	18–12	8–8	T–5th	
2001–02	Mike Dement	15–14	10–8	4th	
2002–03	Mike Dement	17–13	11–7	3rd	
2003–04	Mike Dement; Robert Lineburg	12–18	5–13	8th	
Jimmy Tubbs (Conference USA) (2004–2006)
2004–05	Jimmy Tubbs	14–14	9–9	T–4th	
2005–06	Jimmy Tubbs	13–16	4–10	10th	
Matt Doherty (Conference USA) (2006–2012)
2006–07	Matt Doherty	14–17	3–13	11th	
2007–08	Matt Doherty	10–20	4–12	11th	
2008–09	Matt Doherty	9–21	3–13	12th	
2009–10	Matt Doherty	14–17	7–9	T–7th	
2010–11	Matt Doherty	20–15	8–8	T–7th	CIT Semifinal
2011–12	Matt Doherty	13–19	4–12	11th	
Larry Brown (Conference USA) (2012–2013)
2012–13	Larry Brown	15–17	5–11	11th	
Larry Brown (American Athletic Conference) (2013–2016)
2013–14	Larry Brown	27–10	12–6	T–3rd	NIT Runner–up
2014–15	Larry Brown	27–7	15–3	1st	NCAA Division I First Round
2015–16	Larry Brown; Tim Jankovich	25–5^{[Note A]}	13–5	2nd	Ineligible
Tim Jankovich (American Athletic Conference) (2016–2022)
2016–17	Tim Jankovich	30–5	17–1	1st	NCAA Division I First Round
2017–18	Tim Jankovich	17–16	6–12	9th	
2018–19	Tim Jankovich	15–17	6–12	9th	
2019–20	Tim Jankovich	19–11	9–9	7th	No postseason held
2020–21	Tim Jankovich	11–6	7–4	4th	NIT First Round
2021–22	Tim Jankovich	24–9	13–4	2nd	NIT Second Round
Rob Lanier (American Athletic Conference) (2022–2024)
2022–23	Rob Lanier	10–22	5–13	10th	
2023–24	Rob Lanier	20–13	11–7	6th	NIT First Round
Andy Enfield (Atlantic Coast Conference) (2024–present)
2024–25	Andy Enfield	24–11	13–7	T–4th	NIT Second Round
2025–26	Andy Enfield	20–14	8–10	T–11th	NCAA Division I First Four
Total:		1454–1301 (.528)			
National champion Postseason invitational champion Conference regular season champion Conference regular season and conference tournament champion Division regular season champion Division regular season and conference tournament champion Conference tournament champion

^A. Due to multiple violations, including academic fraud and unethical conduct, SMU was ineligible for all postseason play including the AAC Tournament and NCAA Tournament. Additionally, head coach Larry Brown was suspended for nine games.
