= Charlie Beasley =

American basketball player (1945–2015)

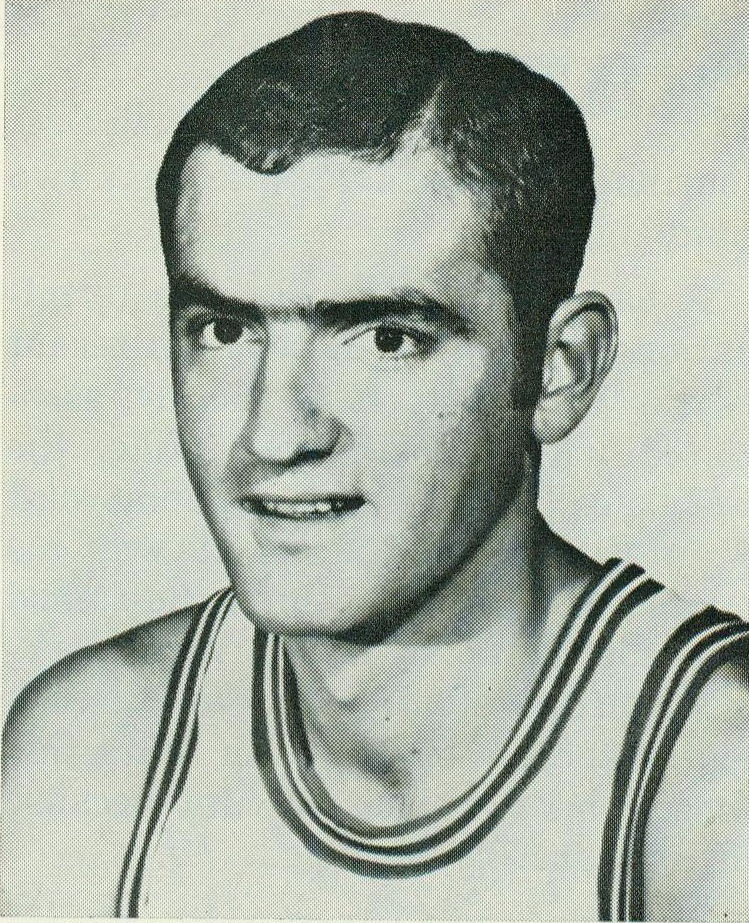

Personal information
- Born: August 23, 1945 Shawnee, Oklahoma
- Died: April 11, 2015 (aged 69) McKinney, Texas
- Listed height: 6 ft 5 in (1.96 m)
- Listed weight: 190 lb (86 kg)

Career information
- High school: Fair Park (Shreveport, Louisiana)
- College: SMU (1964–1967)
- NBA draft: 1967: 7th round, 74th overall pick
- Drafted by: Cincinnati Royals
- Playing career: 1967–1971
- Position: Forward / guard
- Number: 24

Career history
- 1967–1971: Dallas/Texas Chaparrals
- 1971: The Floridians
- Stats at Basketball Reference

Charles P. Beasley (September 23, 1945 – April 11, 2015) was an American basketball player. Beasley played college basketball for the SMU Mustangs. He played professionally in the ABA for the Dallas Chaparrals and The Floridians.

== College career ==
Beasley played collegiately for Southern Methodist University from 1964 to 1967. Beasley averaged 15.4 points and 4.5 rebounds a game during his collegiate career.

In Beasley’s first year with SMU in 1964–65, he was third leading scorer over the season and averaged 12.8 points and 3.1 rebounds a game. The Mustangs finished with an overall record of 17-10 and qualified for the 1965 NCAA tournament. In the tournament, the Mustangs lost in the Midwest regional semifinal to Wichita State.

In 1965–66, Beasley increased his scoring and role on SMU, averaging 18.7 points per game, second on the team behind Carroll Hooser. The Mustangs finished 17–9 and lost in the Midwest regional semifinal to Kansas in the 1966 NCAA tournament.

Beasley returned to SMU for his final season in 1966–67. Averaging 15 points per game, he was the second leading scorer behind Denny Holman. SMU defeated Louisville in the Midwest regional semifinal of the 1967 NCAA tournament. Beasley played his final college game in a 83–75 loss to Houston in the Midwest regional final, which eliminated SMU from the championship.

== Professional career ==
He was selected by the Cincinnati Royals in the seventh round (74th pick overall) of the 1967 NBA draft.

He played for the Dallas/Texas Chaparrals (1967–1971) and The Floridians (1971) in the ABA for 281 games. Beasley died aged 69 in 2015.
