= George Brown (basketball) =

American basketball player

Personal information
- Born: October 30, 1935
- Died: September 2016 (aged 80)
- Listed height: 6 ft 6 in (1.98 m)
- Listed weight: 190 lb (86 kg)

Career information
- High school: Cass Technical (Detroit, Michigan)
- College: Wayne State (1953–1957)
- NBA draft: 1957: 4th round, 27th overall pick
- Drafted by: Minneapolis Lakers
- Position: Forward
- Number: 22

Career history
- 1957: Minneapolis Lakers
- 1958: Harlem Globetrotters
- 1960–1961: Cook's Texaco Oilers
- 1961–1962: Toledo Twisters
- 1962–1963: Grand Rapids Tackers
- 1963–1964: Battle Creek Braves

Career highlights
- 2× First-team All-PAC (1956, 1957)
- Stats at NBA.com
- Stats at Basketball Reference

George Raff Brown (October 30, 1935 – September 2016) was an American basketball player for the Minneapolis Lakers in the National Basketball Association (NBA). He played college basketball at Wayne State University. Brown was selected by the Lakers in the fourth round of the 1957 NBA draft. He played one game for the Lakers. He also played for the Harlem Globetrotters and later in the Midwest Professional Basketball League.

== College career ==
After playing basketball for Cass Technical High School, Brown played collegiately at Wayne State, where he also competed on the school's track and field team. He led the basketball team in scoring in his final two seasons, averaging 17.4 and 19.1 points per game, respectively. He averaged 15 rebounds per game over his last three seasons.

As a junior, Brown helped lead the team to the 1956 NCAA tournament, the second postseason tournament appearance in the school's history. They were the second team from Michigan to ever play in the tournament. The Tartars advanced to the second round before losing to Kentucky. In his senior year, Brown was voted the team's outstanding player of the year and was named an honorary co-captain for the season. He was inducted into the school's athletics hall of fame in 1983.

== Professional career ==
Brown was selected by the Minneapolis Lakers in the fourth round (27th pick overall) of the 1957 NBA draft. He became the first Wayne State player to be drafted by a pro basketball team. He appeared in one regular season game for the Lakers, on October 30, 1957, where he scored 1 point, becoming one of 11 players in NBA history to score their current career high on their birthday. He was waived by the Lakers on November 4, 1957.

Following his release from the Lakers, he played with the Harlem Globetrotters barnstorming team. During the 1960–61 season, he played for the Cook's Texaco Oilers. Considered a pro player, he was released in February 1961, when the team was preparing to become a member of the Amateur Athletic Union in Michigan. He spent the next few seasons in the Midwest Professional Basketball League with the Toledo Twisters, Grand Rapids Tackers and the Battle Creek Braves.

== Personal life ==
Brown died in September 2016 at age 80.

== Career statistics ==
Legend
| GP | Games played | GS | Games started | MPG | Minutes per game |
| FG% | Field goal percentage | 3P% | 3-point field goal percentage | FT% | Free throw percentage |
| RPG | Rebounds per game | APG | Assists per game | SPG | Steals per game |
| BPG | Blocks per game | PPG | Points per game | **Bold** | Career high |

=== NBA ===
==== Regular season ====
| Year | Team | GP | MPG | FG% | FT% | RPG | APG | PPG |
|---|---|---|---|---|---|---|---|---|
| 1957–58 | Minneapolis | 1 | 6.0 | .000 | .500 | 1.0 | .0 | 1.0 |
