= 1955–56 SMU Mustangs men's basketball team =

American college basketball season

1955–56 SMU Mustangs men's basketball

Southwest Conference champion

NCAA tournament, Final Four
- Conference: Southwest Conference

Ranking
- Coaches: No. 6
- AP: No. 7
- Record: 25–4 (12–0 SWC)
- Head coach: Doc Hayes (9th season)
- Assistant coach: Bob Prewitt (7th season)
- Home arena: Perkins Gymnasium

1955–56 Southwest Conference men's basketball standings
	Conf.				Overall
Team	W		L	PCT	W		L	PCT
No. 7 SMU	12	–	0	1.000	25	–	4	.862
Arkansas	9	–	3	.750	11	–	12	.478
Rice	8	–	4	.667	19	–	5	.792
Texas	5	–	7	.417	12	–	10	.545
Baylor	3	–	9	.250	6	–	17	.261
Texas A&M	3	–	9	.250	6	–	18	.250
TCU	2	–	10	.167	4	–	20	.167
Rankings from AP Poll

The 1955–56 SMU Mustangs men's basketball team represented Southern Methodist University as a member of the Southwest Conference during the 1955–56 NCAA men's basketball season. The team was led by head coach Doc Hayes and played their home games at Perkins Gymnasium in Dallas, Texas for the final season (SMU Coliseum opened in December 1956). Playing out of the Midwest region, the Mustangs made a run to the Final Four of the NCAA tournament – the first, and only, in program history. In the National semifinals, SMU lost to the eventual National champions, San Francisco, 86–68, in what was the Dons 54th consecutive victory. The Mustangs closed out the season with a loss to Temple in the consolation game to finish with a record of 25–4 (12–0). Three of the team's four losses came to Final Four participants.

== Roster ==
1955–56 SMU Mustangs men's basketball team
Players	Coaches
Pos. / # / Name / Height / Weight / Year / Previous school / Hometown; C / 32 / Jim Krebs / 6 ft 8 in (2.03 m) / 225 lb (102 kg) / Jr / Webster Groves HS / Webster Groves, Missouri	Head coach: Doc Hayes; Assistant coach(es) Bob Prewitt Legend: (C) Team captain; (S) Suspended; (I) Ineligible; (W) Walk-on; Injured; Current redshirt; Roster

== Schedule and results ==
Date time, TV	Rank^{#}	Opponent^{#}	Result	Record	Site city, state
Regular season
December 1, 1955*		North Texas State	W 82–67	1–0	Perkins Gym; Dallas, TX
December 3, 1955*		Austin College	W 94–56	2–0	Perkins Gym; Dallas, TX
December 6, 1955*		Texas Wesleyan	W 65–42	3–0	Perkins Gym; Dallas, TX
December 9, 1955*		at No. 4 Iowa	L 62–80	3–1	Iowa Field House; Iowa City, IA
December 10, 1955*		at No. 20 Minnesota	W 82–81 ^{OT}	4–1	Williams Arena; Minneapolis, MN
December 12, 1955*		at Wisconsin	W 75–62	5–1	Wisconsin Field House; Madison, WI
December 17, 1955*		No. 18 Kansas	W 81–61	6–1	Perkins Gym; Dallas, TX
December 21, 1955*		at Kansas	L 58–62	6–2	Allen Fieldhouse; Lawrence, KS
December 22, 1955*		at Wichita	W 85–67	7–2	University of Wichita Field House; Wichita, KS
December 28, 1955*		vs. Arkansas; SWC Christmas Tournament	W 67–62	8–2	Tudor Fieldhouse; Houston, TX
December 29, 1955*		vs. Southern California; SWC Christmas Tournament	W 70–64	9–2	Tudor Fieldhouse; Houston, TX
Dec 30, 1955*		at No. 17 Rice; SWC Christmas Tournament	W 76–73 ^{OT}	10–2	Tudor Fieldhouse; Houston, TX
Jan 4, 1956		No. 18 Rice	W 87–65	11–2 (1–0)	Perkins Gym; Dallas, TX
Jan 7, 1956		at Texas	W 66–63	12–2 (2–0)	Gregory Gym; Austin, TX
January 10, 1956		Texas A&M	W 97–68	13–2 (3–0)	Perkins Gym; Dallas, Texas
January 28, 1956	No. 18	Texas Christian	W 105–64	14–2 (4–0)	Perkins Gym; Dallas, Texas
January 31, 1956	No. 17	at Baylor	W 92–72	15–2 (5–0)	Heart O' Texas Fair Complex; Waco, Texas
February 4, 1956	No. 17	at Arkansas	W 58–53	16–2 (6–0)	Barnhill Arena; Fayetteville, AR
Feb 7, 1956	No. 15	Texas	W 109–96	17–2 (7–0)	Perkins Gym; Dallas, TX
Feb 28, 1956	No. 9	Rice	W 89–75	22–2 (12–0)	Perkins Gym; Dallas, TX
NCAA Tournament
March 13, 1956*	No. 7	vs. Texas Tech; First round	W 68–67	23–2	University of Wichita Field House; Wichita, KS
March 16, 1956*	No. 7	vs. Houston; Midwest Regional semifinal – Sweet Sixteen	W 89–74	24–2	Allen Fieldhouse; Lawrence, KS
March 17, 1956*	No. 7	vs. No. 11 Oklahoma City; Midwest Regional final – Elite Eight	W 84–63	25–2	Allen Fieldhouse; Lawrence, KS
March 22, 1956*	No. 7	vs. No. 1 San Francisco; National semifinal – Final Four	L 68–86	25–3	McGaw Hall; Evanston, IL
March 23, 1956*	No. 7	vs. No. 15 Temple; Consolation	L 81–90	25–4	McGaw Hall; Evanston, Illinois
*Non-conference game. ^{#}Rankings from AP Poll. (#) Tournament seedings in parentheses. MW=Midwest. All times are in Eastern Standard Time.

== Rankings ==
Ranking movements Legend: ██ Increase in ranking ██ Decrease in ranking — = Not ranked т = Tied with team above or below
	Week															
Poll	Pre	1	2	3	4	5	6	7	8	9	10	11	12	13	14	Final
AP	Not released	—	—	—	—	—	—	19	18	17	15	12	12	9	8	7
Coaches	18 т	—	—	12	19 т	10 т	7	8 т	9	10	9	8	7	7	6	Not released

== Awards and honors ==
- Jim Krebs – All-American
