= Gerald Lewis =

Gerald Lewis may refer to:

- Gerald Lewis (basketball) (born 1971), retired American basketball player
- Gerald Lewis (politician) (born 1934), American attorney and Florida state comptroller
