= Frederick Cohen =

Frederick Cohen may refer to:

- Fritz Cohen (Frederick A. Cohen, 1904–1967), German composer
- Frederick R. Cohen (1945–2022), American mathematician specializing in algebraic topology
- Fred Cohen (born 1956), American computer scientist
- Fred Cohen (basketball) (1933–2002), American basketball player
- Freddie Cohen (born 1957), British businessman and politician
