= Fred Cohen (basketball) =

American basketball player

Personal information
- Born: March 31, 1933 The Bronx, New York, U.S.
- Died: March 30, 2022 (aged 88) Tucson, Arizona, U.S.
- Listed height: 6 ft 6 in (1.98 m)

Career information
- High school: Yeadon (Lansdowne, Pennsylvania)
- College: Duquesne (1953–1954); Temple (1955–1956)
- NBA draft: 1956: undrafted
- Number: 15

Fred Cohen (March 31, 1933 – March 30, 2022) was an American basketball player. Cohen played college basketball at Duquesne University and Temple University. He is best remembered for his historic 34-rebound game as a member of Temple in the 1956 NCAA tournament, an NCAA playoff record and Palestra arena record.

== Early life and college career ==
Cohen was born in The Bronx in New York City and grew up in Yeadon, Pennsylvania. He attended Yeadon High School (now Penn Wood High School due to a 1982 merger).

Cohen began his college career playing for the Duquesne Dukes. He played one season for Temple in his senior year in the 1955–56 season, averaging 8.2 points and 9.9 rebounds per game. At Temple he played alongside Hal Lear and Guy Rodgers and went to the Final Four in 1956.

While playing for Temple in the 1956 NCAA tournament, Cohen set an NCAA Division I record for rebounds in a playoff game with 34 against UConn.

== Later life ==
Cohen attended Temple University Beasley School of Law and edited the Law Review. After graduating with honors, he was awarded a fellowship to Yale Law School. He graduated from Yale with the L.L.M. degree.

Cohen then entered law school teaching and became a scholar and the nation’s leading legal expert on the rights of mentally ill prisoners. He worked with several presidential commissions and also the American Bar Association in producing standards for juvenile and criminal justice. He was also an author and editor, a federal court prison monitor and keynote speaker. Cohen taught at the University of Denver Law School, the University of Texas at Austin School of Law, and the University at Albany School of Criminal Justice.

In 2013, he was inducted into the Philadelphia Jewish Sports Hall of Fame.

== Death ==
Cohen died on March 30, 2022 in Tucson, Arizona on the eve of his 89th birthday. He was survived by his wife Emily and children Roger, Rachel, and Reuben.

== See also ==
- List of NCAA Division I men's basketball players with 30 or more rebounds in a game
