= 1980 Tefilin Polyesters season =

- Head coach: Fely Fajardo
- Owner(s): Filipinas Synthetic Fiber Corp.

Open Conference results
- Record: 9–9 (50%)
- Place: 6th
- Playoff finish: N/A

Invitational Championship results
- Record: 0–0
- Place: N/A
- Playoff finish: N/A

All Filipino Conference results
- Record: 5–7 (41.7%)
- Place: N/A
- Playoff finish: N/A

Tefilin Polyesters seasons

The 1980 Tefilin Polyesters season was the 1st season of the franchise in the Philippine Basketball Association (PBA).

== New team ==
Filipinas Synthetic Fiber Corporation (Filsyn), a textile manufacturing firm, was one of two new companies joining the PBA in the league's 1980 season, increasing the number of teams to 10. Among the amateur recruits of the new ballclub to be known as Tefilin were Jojo de Guzman and four former members of the Philippine team – Efren Manila, Caesar Yabut, Joselito Ocampo and Gregorio Gozum. The team will be handled by veteran coach Fely Fajardo, who was returning to the league after a four-year absence, and with assistant coach Jun Bernardino and team manager Frank Harn. In the Open Conference, the ballclub has enlisted the services of Ira Terrell, starter of the Phoenix Suns in the NBA team's last 36 games in 1976, and Charlie Floyd, a Washington Bullets' third round choice, as their imports.

== Notable date ==
March 20: Tefilin scored the season's early shocker, upsetting powerhouse Crispa Walk Tall Jeans, 79-75, for their very first franchise win.

== Win–loss record vs opponents ==
Teams	Win	Loss	1st (Open)	3rd (All-Filipino)
Galleon Shippers	2	2	1-1	1-1
Gilbey’s Gin	2	1	2-0	0–1
Great Taste / Presto	2	2	0–2	2-0
Honda	2	2	1-1	1-1
Royal / San Miguel	2	1	2-0	0–1
Tanduay	3	0	2-0	1-0
Toyota Tamaraws	0	3	0–2	0–1
U-Tex Wranglers	0	3	0–2	0–1
Walk Tall / Crispa	1	2	1-1	0–1
Total	14	16	9-9	5–7

== Roster ==
Tefilin roster
Players
Coaches

Pos.	No.	Nat.	Name	Ht.	Wt.
G	5	(Philippines)	Marty Tierra	5 ft 11 in (1.80 m)		José Rizal
F	6	(Philippines)	Gregorio Gozum	6 ft 2 in (1.88 m)		Letran
G	7	(Philippines)	Efren Manila	5 ft 11 in (1.80 m)
F	8	(Philippines)	Ricardo Mariano	6 ft 0 in (1.83 m)		Mapúa
G	9	(Philippines)	Joselito Ocampo	6 ft 1 in (1.85 m)		PSBA
C	10	(Philippines)	Danilo Mendoza	6 ft 5 in (1.96 m)		Letran
G	11	(Philippines)	Jose Orozco	5 ft 9 in (1.75 m)		UST
C	14	(Philippines)	Mario Basco	6 ft 3 in (1.91 m)		San Sebastian
G	15	(Philippines)	Fernando De Guzman	5 ft 9 in (1.75 m)		Letran
F	21	(Philippines)	Jovenal Francisco	6 ft 0 in (1.83 m)		Far Eastern
F	24	(Philippines)	Caesar Yabut	6 ft 2 in (1.88 m)		Mapúa
F	17	(Philippines)	Amadeo Sagarbarria	6 ft 2 in (1.88 m)		De La Salle
F/C	32	(United States)	Ira Terrell (I)	6 ft 8 in (2.03 m)		SMU
F	33	(United States)	Charles Floyd (I)	6 ft 7 in (2.01 m)		High Point

Head coach

- (Philippines) Fely Fajardo

Assistant coach(es)

- (Philippines) Jun Bernardino

Legend

- (C) Team captain
- (I) Import
- Injured
