= Abe Lemons =

American basketball player and coach (1922–2002)

- Lemons as head coach at Texas

Biographical details
- Born: November 21, 1922; Ryan, Oklahoma, U.S.
- Died: September 2, 2002 (aged 79); Oklahoma City, Oklahoma, U.S.

Playing career
- 1946–1947: Hardin
- 1947–1949: Oklahoma City
- Positions: Center, forward

Coaching career (HC unless noted)
- 1955–1973: Oklahoma City
- 1973–1976: Pan American
- 1976–1982: Texas
- 1983–1990: Oklahoma City

Head coaching record
- Overall: 594–343

Accomplishments and honors

Championships
- NIT (1978); 2 SWC regular season (1978, 1979); SAC regular season (1987)

Awards
- NABC Coach of the Year (1978); SWC Coach of the Year (1978)

A.E. "Abe" Lemons (November 21, 1922 – September 2, 2002) was an American college basketball player and coach. As a head coach at Oklahoma City University, Pan American University and the University of Texas at Austin, he compiled a record of 594–343 in 34 seasons.

== Early life ==
Lemons was born in Ryan, Oklahoma, and given the initials-only name "A.E." He grew up in the town of Walters, Oklahoma and graduated from Walters High School in the spring of 1941.

Lemons earned a basketball scholarship to play for Southwestern Oklahoma Teachers College (now known as Southwestern Oklahoma State University). and their long-time coach Rankin Williams.

After the United States entered World War II in December 1941, Lemons joined the Merchant Marine. He served in the Pacific and often referred to the pressures of his war experience to put sports into perspective.

After the war, Lemons enrolled at Hardin College, which had just added a four-year senior college in 1946. He was a 6-foot 4-inch center/forward for the Indians, who finished 4–15 under first-year head coach Fermon "Red" Rutledge, during the 1946–47 season.

In 1947, Lemons transferred to Oklahoma City University (OCU) where he played two years for coach Doyle Parrack. In 1947–48, the Chiefs had an 18–13 record, which improved to 20–6 in 1948–49.

== Coaching career ==
=== Oklahoma City University ===
Lemons was hired in 1955 to coach at his alma mater. He would coach the program until 1973 in his first tenure there. During that time, the team went 309–181 while making the NIT twice while appearing in the NCAA tournament seven times (1956, 1957, 1963–1966, and 1973). Oklahoma City also won the All-College Tournament in 1965. Lemons coached several All-America & future NBA players, such as Arnold Short and Hub Reed.

=== Pan American University ===
From 1973 to 1976, Lemons was head coach at Pan American University, where he was named 1974–75 Texas Coach of the Year and coached the nation's leading scorer in Marshall Rogers.

=== University of Texas ===
Lemons became the head coach at the University of Texas on March 16, 1976, succeeding Leon Black who had resigned seventeen days prior on February 28. He served as president of the National Association of Basketball Coaches in 1977 and was named National Coach of the Year in 1978. In March 1978, Lemons led the University of Texas to the championship of the NIT with a victory over North Carolina State. The Longhorns would enjoy a minor blip in national prominence under Lemons, with the aforementioned NIT championship and an NCAA Tournament appearance in 1979. Lemons' last season at Texas was 1981–82.

Lemons became beloved across all of his jobs for his witticisms, but at his most prominent job, Texas, he made a number of notable quotes that made him popular among the fanbase. When Rice head coach Mike Schuler made 99 substitutions in a 78–64 Longhorns victory at the Frank Erwin Center on January 17, 1978, Lemons commented, "All they need are a few clowns to make a circus." In the rematch which was also won by the Longhorns 102–86 at Rice Gymnasium three weeks later on February 7, he and his players encountered a crowd which included about 75 Rice students dressed as clowns. An unfazed Lemons responded, "I was in the war with the Japanese and the Germans. After that, a few clowns aren't going to bother me."

=== Return to Oklahoma City University ===
Lemons returned to Oklahoma City University in 1983. In his second stint at the program, Lemons took the Chiefs (now known as the Stars) to the NAIA Championship tournament once and to the District IX playoffs four times. Lemons was Sooner Athletic Conference Coach of the Year in 1985–1986. OCU had an undefeated season record and a trip to the NAIA tournament in 1986–1987. That year, they were ranked number one throughout the season. The season ended with a 34–1 record, Lemons was named District 9 Coach of the Year and Sooner Athletic Conference Coach of the Year. In 1987, he was named Basketball Times Coach of the Year. In 1989, he received the Jim Thorpe Lifetime Achievement Award.

During his 25 years with OCU, Lemons posted a record of 432–264. He brought positive national attention to the state of Oklahoma, Oklahoma City, and OCU. He established himself as a "teacher of men," not only in sports, but in the values of life, as proven by the success and leadership accomplishments of his students and players. In 1990, Lemons was inducted into the Oklahoma Sports Hall of Fame.

== Personal life and death ==
Lemons married Betty Jo Bills, and they had two daughters, Dana and Jan.

Lemons died on September 2, 2002, of complications from Parkinson's disease at the age of 79.

== Head coaching record ==
Record table
Season	Team	Overall	Conference	Standing	Postseason
Oklahoma City Chiefs (NCAA University Division independent) (1955–1973)
1955–56	Oklahoma City	20–7			NCAA Elite Eight
1956–57	Oklahoma City	19–9			NCAA University Division Elite Eight
1957–58	Oklahoma City	14–12			
1958–59	Oklahoma City	20–7			NIT Quarterfinal
1959–60	Oklahoma City	12–13			
1960–61	Oklahoma City	14–12			
1961–62	Oklahoma City	14–12			
1962–63	Oklahoma City	19–10			NCAA University Division Sweet 16
1963–64	Oklahoma City	15–11			NCAA University Division First Round
1964–65	Oklahoma City	21–10			NCAA University Division Elite Eight
1965–66	Oklahoma City	24–5			NCAA University Division First Round
1966–67	Oklahoma City	16–10			
1967–68	Oklahoma City	20–7			NIT First Round
1968–69	Oklahoma City	18–9			
1969–70	Oklahoma City	17–13			
1970–71	Oklahoma City	9–16			
1971–72	Oklahoma City	16–12			
1972–73	Oklahoma City	21–6			NCAA University Division First Round
Pan American Broncs (Independent) (1973–1976)
1973–74	Pan American	13–9			
1974–75	Pan American	22–2			
1975–76	Pan American	20–5			
Pan American:		55–16 (.775)			
Texas Longhorns (Southwest Conference) (1976–1982)
1976–77	Texas	13–13	8–8	T–4th	
1977–78	Texas	26–5	14–2	T–1st	NIT Champion
1978–79	Texas	21–8	13–3	T–1st	NCAA Division I Second Round
1979–80	Texas	19–11	10–6	3rd	NIT Second Round
1980–81	Texas	15–15	7–9	T–6th	
1981–82	Texas	16–11	6–10	T–7th	
Texas:		110–63 (.636)	58–38 (.604)		
Oklahoma City Chiefs (Midwestern City Conference) (1983–1985)
1983–84	Oklahoma City	8–18	3–11	8th	
1984–85	Oklahoma City	6–20	1–13	8th	
Oklahoma City Chiefs (Sooner Athletic Conference) (1985–1990)
1985–86	Oklahoma City	21–6			
1986–87	Oklahoma City	34–1		1st	NAIA Second Round
1987–88	Oklahoma City	19–12			
1988–89	Oklahoma City	12–14			
1989–90	Oklahoma City	18–13			
Oklahoma City:		427–264 (.618)			
Total:		592–343 (.633)			
National champion Postseason invitational champion Conference regular season champion Conference regular season and conference tournament champion Division regular season champion Division regular season and conference tournament champion Conference tournament champion
