= 1968–69 SMU Mustangs men's basketball team =

American college basketball season

1968–69 SMU Mustangs men's basketball
- Conference: Southwest Conference
- Record: 12–12 (8–6 SWC)
- Head coach: Bob Prewitt (2nd season)
- Home arena: Moody Coliseum

The 1968–69 SMU Mustangs men's basketball team represented Southern Methodist University during the 1968–69 men's college basketball season.

== Roster ==
1968–69 SMU Mustangs men's basketball team
Players	Coaches
Pos. / # / Name / Height / Weight / Year / Hometown; F / 23 / Gene Phillips / 6 ft 4 in (1.93 m) / 175 lb (79 kg) / So / Houston, Texas	Head coach: Bob Prewitt; Assistant coach(es) Legend: (C) Team captain; (S) Suspended; (I) Ineligible; (W) Walk-on; Injured; Current redshirt

== Schedule ==
Date time, TV	Rank^{#}	Opponent^{#}	Result	Record	Site city, state
December 2*		at No. 13 Vanderbilt	L 94–97	0–1	Memorial Gymnasium; Nashville, Tennessee
December 3*		at Georgia Tech	L 59–87	0–2	Alexander Memorial Coliseum; Atlanta, Georgia
December 7*		at No. 17 Western Kentucky	L 79–92	0–3	E.A. Diddle Arena; Bowling Green, Kentucky
December 9*		at Southern Illinois	W 81–70	1–3	The SIU Arena; Carbondale, Illinois
December 11*		Louisville	L 73–79	1–4	Moody Coliseum; University Park, Texas
December 23*		Yale	W 82–76	2–4	Moody Coliseum; University Park, Texas
December 27*		Ole Miss	W 94–70	3–4	Moody Coliseum; University Park, Texas
December 28*		Drake	L 81–86	3–5	Moody Coliseum; University Park, Texas
January 4		at TCU	W 81–78	4–5 (1–0)	Daniel-Meyer Coliseum; Fort Worth, Texas
January 7		at Baylor	L 67–69	4–6 (1–1)	Heart O' Texas Coliseum; Waco, Texas
January 11		Texas	W 68–62	5–6 (2–1)	Moody Coliseum; University Park, Texas
January 14		Texas A&M	L 75–76 ^{OT}	5–7 (2–2)	Moody Coliseum; University Park, Texas
January 18		at Rice	W 101–80	6–7 (3–2)	Tudor Fieldhouse; Houston, Texas
January 20*		at Oklahoma City	L 74–96	6–8 (3–2)	State Fair Arena; Oklahoma City, OK
January 25*		Oklahoma City	W 103–84	7–8 (3–2)	Moody Coliseum; University Park, Texas
February 1		Texas Tech	W 87–77	8–8 (4–2)	Moody Coliseum; University Park, Texas
February 8		Arkansas	W 84–69	9–8 (5–2)	Moody Coliseum; University Park, Texas
February 11		at Texas Tech	W 84–65	10–8 (6–2)	Lubbock Municipal Coliseum; Lubbock, Texas
February 15		at Arkansas	W 76–68	11–8 (7–2)	Barnhill Arena; Fayetteville, Arkansas
February 18		TCU	L 84–87 ^{OT}	11–9 (7–3)	Moody Coliseum; University Park, Texas
February 22		Baylor	L 78–90 ^{OT}	11–10 (7–4)	Moody Coliseum; University Park, Texas
February 25		at Texas	W 71–69	12–10 (8–4)	Gregory Gym; Austin, Texas
March 1		at Texas A&M	L 98–119	12–11 (8–5)	G. Rollie White Coliseum; College Station, Texas
March 4		Rice	L 90–96	12–12 (8–6)	Moody Coliseum; University Park, Texas
*Non-conference game. ^{#}Rankings from AP Poll. (#) Tournament seedings in parentheses.
