= 1955–56 Houston Cougars men's basketball team =

American college basketball season

1955–56 Houston Cougars men's basketball
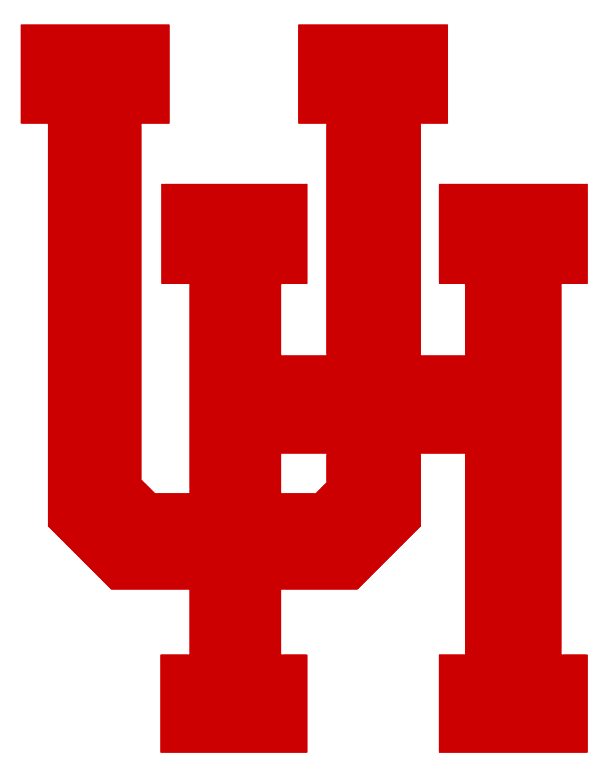

Missouri Valley Conference champions

NCAA tournament, Regional Semifinals
- Conference: Missouri Valley Conference
- Record: 19–7 (9–3 MVC)
- Head coach: Alden Pasche (11th season)
- Assistant coaches: Guy Lewis; Ned Thompson
- Home arena: Public School Fieldhouse

1955–56 Missouri Valley Conference men's basketball standings
	Conf.				Overall
Team	W		L	PCT	W		L	PCT
Houston	9	–	3	.750	19	–	7	.731
Saint Louis	8	–	4	.667	18	–	7	.720
No. 19 Oklahoma A&M	8	–	4	.667	18	–	9	.667
Wichita	7	–	5	.583	14	–	12	.538
Tulsa	4	–	8	.333	16	–	10	.615
Detroit	3	–	9	.250	13	–	12	.520
Bradley	3	–	9	.250	13	–	13	.500
Rankings from AP Poll

The 1955–56 Houston Cougars men's basketball team represented the University of Houston in the 1955–56 season of college basketball. It was their eleventh year of season play. The head coach for the Cougars was Alden Pasche, who was serving in his 11th year in that position. The team played its home games at Public School Fieldhouse on-campus in Houston and were members of the Missouri Valley Conference. Houston captured its fourth conference regular season title, and competed in the postseason in the 1956 NCAA basketball tournament where they were defeated by SMU and Kansas State. It was Houston's first ever appearance in the NCAA tournament.

After the season, Pasche retired. He was 135–116 in eleven seasons, and was replaced by assistant coach Guy Lewis.

== Roster ==
1955–56 Houston Cougars men's basketball team
Players
Coaches

Pos.	#	Name	Height	Weight	Year	Hometown
F	34	Arthur Helms	6 ft 4 in (1.93 m)	—	So
C	40	Don Boldebuck	7 ft 0 in (2.13 m)	—	So

Head coach

- Alden Pasche (Rice)

Assistant coach(es)

- Guy Lewis (Houston)
- Ned Thompson (Stephen F. Austin)

Legend

- (C) Team captain
- (S) Suspended
- (I) Ineligible
- (W) Walk-on
- Injured
- Current redshirt

Roster
Last update: 2021-05-18

== Schedule ==
Date time, TV	Rank^{#}	Opponent^{#}	Result	Record	Site city, state
Regular season
12/1/1955*		Sam Houston State	W 77–55	1–0	Public School Fieldhouse; Houston, Texas
12/7/1955*		Texas A&I	W 86–59	2–0	Public School Fieldhouse; Houston, Texas
12/9/1955*		vs. Valparaiso; Birmingham Classic	L 80–84	2–1	Unknown; Birmingham, Alabama
12/10/1955*		vs. TCU; Birmingham Classic	W 101–58	3–1	Unknown; Birmingham, Alabama
12/14/1955*		at Texas A&M	W 78–44	4–1	G. Rollie White Coliseum; College Station, Texas
12/16/1955		Detroit Mercy	W 89–76	5–1 (1–0)	Public School Fieldhouse; Houston, Texas
12/17/1955		Detroit Mercy	W 86–84	6–1 (2–0)	Public School Fieldhouse; Houston, Texas
12/21/1955*		Kansas State	W 86–79	7–1	Public School Fieldhouse; Houston, Texas
1/2/1956		Wichita	W 82–77	8–1 (3–0)	Public School Fieldhouse; Houston, Texas
1/7/1956		Saint Louis	L 73–76	8–2 (3–1)	Public School Fieldhouse; Houston, Texas
1/9/1956*		No. 16 Oklahoma City	W 78–64	9–2	Public School Fieldhouse; Houston, Texas
1/12/1956		at Tulsa	W 69–60	10–2 (4–1)	Tulsa Fairgrounds Pavilion; Tulsa, Oklahoma
1/14/1956		at Oklahoma A&M	L 44–63	10–3 (4–2)	Gallagher Hall; Stillwater, Oklahoma
1/23/1956		Tulsa	W 71–62 ^{OT}	11–3 (5–2)	Public School Fieldhouse; Houston, Texas
1/25/1956*		at Miami (FL)	W 95–77	12–3	Unknown; Coral Gables, Florida
1/28/1956*		Trinity (TX)	W 104–62	13–3	Public School Fieldhouse; Houston, Texas
1/30/1956*		at Sam Houston State	W 87–59	14–3	Sam Houston State Gymnasium; Huntsville, Texas
2/4/1956*		Texas A&M	W 105–74	15–3	Public School Fieldhouse; Houston, Texas
2/9/1956		at Bradley	W 82–70	16–3 (6–2)	Robertson Memorial Field House; Peoria, Illinois
2/11/1956		at No. 11 Saint Louis	W 67–66	17–3 (7–2)	Kiel Auditorium; St. Louis, Missouri
2/18/1956	No. 18	Oklahoma A&M	W 62–60	18–3 (8–2)	Public School Fieldhouse; Houston, Texas
2/20/1956	No. 14	Bradley	W 68–53	19–3 (9–2)	Public School Fieldhouse; Houston, Texas
2/25/1956	No. 14	at Wichita	L 72–82	19–4 (9–3)	University of Wichita Field House; Wichita, Kansas
2/27/1956*	No. 18	at No. 16 Oklahoma City	L 67–76	19–5	Municipal Auditorium; Oklahoma City, Oklahoma
NCAA tournament
3/16/1956*		vs. No. 7 SMU; Regional semifinals – Sweet Sixteen	L 74–89	19–6	Allen Fieldhouse; Lawrence, Kansas
3/17/1956*		vs. Kansas State; Regional third-place game	L 70–89	19–7	Allen Fieldhouse; Lawrence, Kansas
*Non-conference game. ^{#}Rankings from AP Poll. (#) Tournament seedings in parentheses.

== Rankings ==
Ranking movements Legend: ██ Increase in ranking ██ Decrease in ranking — = Not ranked
	Week														
Poll	1	2	3	4	5	6	7	8	9	10	11	12	13	14	Final
AP	—	—	—	—	—	—	—	—	—	—	18	14	18	17	—
Coaches	—	—	—	—	—	—	—	—	—	—	—	19	14	18	—
