= 1955–56 Temple Owls men's basketball team =

American college basketball season

1955–56 Temple Owls men's basketball

NCAA tournament, Third place
- Conference: Independent

Ranking
- Coaches: No. 14
- AP: No. 15
- Record: 27–4
- Head coach: Harry Litwack (4th season)
- Home arena: The Palestra

The 1955–56 Temple Owls men's basketball team represented Temple University during the 1955–56 NCAA men's basketball season. The team was led by head coach Harry Litwack and played their home games at The Palestra in Philadelphia, Pennsylvania.

Playing out of the East region, the Owls made a run to the Final Four of the NCAA tournament – the first in program history. In the National semifinals, Temple lost to Iowa. The Owls bounced back to defeat SMU in the consolation game to finish with a record of 27–4. It would be the second time in three seasons Temple reached the Final Four and took third place.

== Roster ==
1955–56 Temple Owls men's basketball team
Players
Coaches

Pos.	#	Name	Height	Weight	Year	Previous school	Hometown
G		Guy Rodgers	6 ft 0 in (1.83 m)	—	So
G		Hal Lear	5 ft 11 in (1.8 m)	—	Sr
		Fred Cohen	6 ft 6 in (1.98 m)	—	Sr
		Hal Reinfeld	6 ft 2 in (1.88 m)	—	Sr
		Jay Norman	6 ft 3 in (1.91 m)	—	So
		Tink Van Patton	6 ft 8 in (2.03 m)	—	So
		Barry Goldstein	6 ft 0 in (1.83 m)	—
		Dan Fleming	6 ft 6 in (1.98 m)	—	So
		Bill Smith	6 ft 4 in (1.93 m)	—	Jr

Head coach

- Harry Litwack

Assistant coach(es)

Legend

- (C) Team captain
- (S) Suspended
- (I) Ineligible
- (W) Walk-on
- Injured
- Current redshirt

Roster

== Schedule and results ==
Date time, TV	Rank^{#}	Opponent^{#}	Result	Record	Site city, state
Regular season
Dec 1, 1957*		Albright	W 87–56	1–0	South Hall; Philadelphia, Pennsylvania
Dec 7, 1957*		Gettysburg	W 74–53	2–0	The Palestra; Philadelphia, Pennsylvania
Dec 10, 1955*		at No. 2 Kentucky	W 73–61	3–0	Memorial Coliseum; Lexington, Kentucky
Dec 14, 1957*	No. 11	at Gettysburg	W 74–53	4–0	Gettysburg, Pennsylvania
Dec 17, 1955*	No. 11	Princeton	W 83–80	5–0	The Palestra; Philadelphia, Pennsylvania
Dec 20, 1955*	No. 12	vs. Penn	W 93–72	6–0	The Palestra; Philadelphia, Pennsylvania
Jan 4, 1956*	No. 16	at Lehigh	W 81–48	7–0	Taylor Gym; Bethlehem, Pennsylvania
Jan 6, 1956*	No. 16	at Scranton	W 90–60	8–0	John Long Center; Scranton, Pennsylvania
Jan 11, 1956*	No. 10	vs. Villanova	W 80–73	9–0	The Palestra; Philadelphia, Pennsylvania
Jan 14, 1956*	No. 10	Manhattan	W 91–79	10–0	The Palestra; Philadelphia, Pennsylvania
Jan 21, 1956*	No. 8	Lehigh	W 72–44	11–0	The Palestra; Philadelphia, Pennsylvania
Jan 26, 1956*	No. 6	at Delaware	W 108–81	12–0	Newark, Delaware
Jan 28, 1956*	No. 6	at Navy	W 93–74	13–0	Dahlgren Hall; Annapolis, Maryland
Feb 1, 1956*	No. 7	at Muhlenberg	L 66–67	13–1	Memorial Hall; Allentown, Pennsylvania
Feb 4, 1956*	No. 7	at Saint Francis (PA)	W 103–68	14–1	Loretto, Pennsylvania
Feb 6, 1956*	No. 9	at Duquesne	W 63–48	15–1	Duquesne Gymnasium; Pittsburgh, Pennsylvania
Feb 8, 1956*	No. 9	Bucknell	W 88–50	16–1	The Palestra; Philadelphia, Pennsylvania
Feb 10, 1956*	No. 9	Penn State	W 77–58	17–1	The Palestra; Philadelphia, Pennsylvania
Feb 15, 1956*	No. 9	vs. La Salle	W 60–57	18–1	The Palestra; Philadelphia, Pennsylvania
Feb 18, 1956*	No. 9	at Lafayette	W 66–65	19–1	Alumni Gym; Easton, Pennsylvania
Feb 20, 1958*	No. 10	Lebanon Valley	W 72–68	20–1	South Hall; Philadelphia, Pennsylvania
Feb 22, 1956*	No. 10	vs. Saint Joseph's	L 68–77	20–2	The Palestra; Philadelphia, Pennsylvania
Feb 25, 1956*	No. 10	Duquesne	L 64–66	20–3	The Palestra; Philadelphia, Pennsylvania
Feb 29, 1958*	No. 14	at Albright	W 86–75	21–3	Reading, Pennsylvania
Mar 7, 1956*	No. 13	St. John's	W 71–66	22–3	The Palestra; Philadelphia, Pennsylvania
Mar 10, 1956*	No. 13	vs. Saint Joseph's	W 89–82	23–3	The Palestra; Philadelphia, Pennsylvania
NCAA Tournament
Mar 12, 1956*	No. 15	vs. No. 14 Holy Cross; First round	W 74–72	24–3	Madison Square Garden; New York, New York
Mar 16, 1956*	No. 15	vs. Connecticut; Regional semifinal – Sweet Sixteen	W 65–59	25–3	The Palestra; Philadelphia, Pennsylvania
Mar 17, 1956*	No. 15	vs. Canisius; Regional final – Elite Eight	W 60–58	26–3	The Palestra; Philadelphia, Pennsylvania
Mar 22, 1956*	No. 15	vs. No. 4 Iowa; National semifinal – Final Four	L 76–83	26–4	McGaw Hall; Evanston, Illinois
Mar 23, 1956*	No. 15	vs. No. 7 Southern Methodist; Consolation	W 90–81	27–4	McGaw Hall; Evanston, Illinois
*Non-conference game. ^{#}Rankings from AP Poll. (#) Tournament seedings in parentheses. E=East. All times are in Eastern Standard Time.

== Rankings ==
Ranking movements Legend: ██ Increase in ranking ██ Decrease in ranking — = Not ranked т = Tied with team above or below
	Week															
Poll	Pre	1	2	3	4	5	6	7	8	9	10	11	12	13	14	Final
AP	Not released	—	11	12	17 т	16	10	8	6	7	9	9	10	14	13	15
Coaches	—	—	11	16 т	—	19	14	9	7	7	8	9	8	12	14	Not released

== Awards and honors ==
- Hal Lear – All-American

== Team players drafted into the NBA ==
Round	Pick	Player	NBA club
1	7	Hal Lear	Philadelphia Warriors
