= Jimmy Tubbs =

American basketball coach

Jimmy Tubbs Jr. (February 16, 1950 – May 9, 2009) was a college basketball coach. A native of Oakwood, Texas, he was head coach of the SMU Mustangs team from 2004 to 2006 before being fired related to NCAA violations.

Before becoming a head coach of the SMU Mustangs, Tubbs was an assistant coach for 2 seasons under Kelvin Sampson at Oklahoma and an assistant at SMU for 12 years prior. Tubbs died on May 9, 2009.

== Head coaching record ==
Statistics overview
Season	Team	Overall	Conference	Standing	Postseason
SMU Mustangs (Western Athletic Conference) (2004–2005)
2004–05	SMU	14–14	9–9	T–4th	
SMU Mustangs (Conference USA) (2005–2006)
2005–06	SMU	13–16	4–10	10th	
SMU:		27–30 (.474)	13–19 (.406)		
Total:		27–30 (.474)			
National champion Postseason invitational champion Conference regular season champion Conference regular season and conference tournament champion Division regular season champion Division regular season and conference tournament champion Conference tournament champion
