= Mike Dement =

American college basketball coach

Biographical details
- Born: April 10, 1954 (age 72)
- Education: Louisburg; East Carolina

Coaching career (HC unless noted)
- 1982–1983: Duke (assistant)
- 1983–1985: Cornell (assistant)
- 1985–1986: East Carolina (assistant)
- 1986–1991: Cornell
- 1991–1995: UNC Greensboro
- 1995–2004: SMU
- 2005–2011: UNC Greensboro

Head coaching record
- Tournaments: 0–1 (NCAA Division I); 0–1 (NIT)

Accomplishments and honors

Championships
- Ivy League regular season (1988); Big South regular season (1995)

Awards
- Ivy League Coach of the Year (1988)

David Michael Dement (born April 10, 1954) is an American college basketball coach who was most recently the head men's basketball coach at the University of North Carolina at Greensboro. He is married to former Southern Methodist University women's basketball head coach Rhonda Rompola.

From Louisburg, North Carolina, he was the head coach for UNCG from 1991 to 1995, leading them from a team with no conference affiliation to the top of the Big South Conference regular season standings in just four seasons. In his last two seasons at UNCG, Dement's teams went 38–18, including a school-record 23 wins in 1994–95 winning the Big South regular season title.

In 2007–08, Dement won his 300th career game when the Spartans topped The Citadel in Charleston. He enters his 23rd year as a head coach with a mark of 312–313.

On December 13, 2011, Dement stepped down as head coach of the Spartans.

== Head coaching record ==
Record table
Season	Team	Overall	Conference	Standing	Postseason
Cornell Big Red (Ivy League) (1986–1991)
1986–87	Cornell	15–11	9–5	T–2nd	
1987–88	Cornell	17–10	11–3	1st	NCAA Division I Round of 64
1988–89	Cornell	10–16	7–7	T–4th	
1989–90	Cornell	12–17	5–9	7th	
1990–91	Cornell	13–13	6–8	T–3rd	
Cornell:		69–67	38–32		
UNC Greensboro Spartans (Independent) (1991–1993)
1991–92	UNC Greensboro	7–21			
1992–93	UNC Greensboro	10–17			
UNC Greensboro Spartans (Big South Conference) (1993–1995)
1993–94	UNC Greensboro	15–12	11–7	5th	
1994–95	UNC Greensboro	23–6	14–2	1st	
UNC Greensboro:		55–56	25–9		
SMU Mustangs (Southwest Conference) (1995–1996)
1995–96	SMU	8–20	3–11	T–7th	
SMU Mustangs (Western Athletic Conference) (1996–2004)
1996–97	SMU	16–12	7–9	T–4th (Mountain)	
1997–98	SMU	18–10	6–8	5th (Pacific)	
1998–99	SMU	15–15	7–7	T–4th (Mountain)	
1999–00	SMU	21–9	9–5	3rd	NIT first round
2000–01	SMU	18–12	8–8	T–5th	
2001–02	SMU	15–14	10–8	4th	
2002–03	SMU	17–13	11–7	3rd	
2003–04	SMU	10–15^{‡}	5–10	8th	
SMU:		138–120	65–74	‡ Dement resigned on February 27. Robert Lineburg coached rest of season.	
UNC Greensboro Spartans (Southern Conference) (2005–2011)
2005–06	UNC Greensboro	12–19	4–10	5th (North)	
2006–07	UNC Greensboro	16–14	12–6	2nd (North)	
2007–08	UNC Greensboro	19–12	12–8	3rd (North)	
2008–09	UNC Greensboro	5–25	4–16	6th (North)	
2009–10	UNC Greensboro	8–23	6–12	5th (North)	
2010–11	UNC Greensboro	7–24	6–12	5th (North)	
2011–12	UNC Greensboro	2–8^{‡}	0–3	6th (North)	
UNC Greensboro:		69–125	44–67	‡ Dement resigned on December 13. Wes Miller coached rest of season.	
Total:		329–368			
National champion Postseason invitational champion Conference regular season champion Conference regular season and conference tournament champion Division regular season champion Division regular season and conference tournament champion Conference tournament champion
