= Mike Wilson (SMU basketball) =

American basketball player

Personal information
- Listed height: 6 ft 5 in (1.96 m)
- Listed weight: 215 lb (98 kg)

Career information
- High school: Redan (Redan, Georgia)
- College: Western Kentucky (1988–1989); SMU (1990–1993)
- NBA draft: 1993: undrafted
- Position: Guard

Career highlights
- SWC Player of the Year (1993); First-team All-SWC (1993); SWC All-Newcomer Team (1991); Sun Belt All-Freshman Team (1989)

Mike Wilson is an American former basketball player known for his college career at Southern Methodist University (SMU) between 1990 and 1993. He set numerous school records and culminated his career in 1992–93 as the Southwest Conference Player of the Year, the fifth SMU Mustang to be so honored in the award's history. He played the guard position.

== Playing career ==
=== High school ===
Wilson grew up in the Atlanta, Georgia area and starred at Redan High School. As a senior in 1987–88, Wilson was named to The Atlanta Constitution's Area All-Stars Team after averaging 19.7 and points and 7.3 rebounds per game. He was also the co-MVP at the B/C Camp during his high school career. Wilson was recruited to play NCAA Division I basketball by Western Kentucky University, to whom he committed the spring of 1988.

=== College ===
As a freshman playing for the Western Kentucky Hilltoppers in 1988–89, Wilson averaged 9.5 points, 2.7 rebounds, and 1.5 assists per game. He was named to the Sun Belt Conference All-Freshman Team. Several months after the season ended, Wilson filed transfer paperwork with the NCAA to go play basketball at SMU; his father had recently relocated to Tyler, Texas for a job and Wilson wanted to be closer to his new home.

After redshirting (sitting out) the 1989–90 season due to NCAA transfer rules, Wilson first suited up for SMU in 1990–91. He burst onto the scene by averaging 18.3 points and 6.5 rebounds per game. Although the Mustangs did not participate in any postseason tournaments, Wilson was honored for his personal performance by being named to the Southwest Conference (SWC) All-Newcomer Team. The following season, Wilson's junior year, saw him average 16.3 points and 6.4 rebounds per game, but he did not earn any accolades, nor did SMU finish better than seventh in the SWC standings.

In Wilson's final season at SMU (1992–93), the Mustangs finished first in the SWC with a 12–2 conference record (20–8 overall) and advanced to the NCAA tournament. Wilson averaged career highs of 19.4 points and 6.9 rebounds per game. He was named to the All-SWC First Team and earned the top individual honor as the SWC Player of the Year. In just 85 games played for SMU, Wilson scored 1,529 points.

Following college, Wilson was not selected in the 1993 NBA draft, nor did make any final rosters.
