= Jim Thorpe Lifetime Achievement Award =

- Description: Highest award presented by the Jim Thorpe Association honoring exemplary lifetime leadership and character
- Country: United States
- Presented by: Jim Thorpe Association

The Jim Thorpe Lifetime Achievement Award is the highest award presented by the Jim Thorpe Association. Without consideration of athletic accomplishments, the award recognizes a lifetime of achievement by people who "set the living examples that influence others to strive for the highest goals and leadership of men, and who blaze the trails of accomplishments which leave behind the pathways of tradition for others to follow."

Only seven people have received this award since the association was founded in 1986.

== Lifetime Achievement Award winners ==
- 1989 – Abe Lemons
- 1992 – George Nigh
- 1993 – Allie Reynolds
- 1999 – Chris Schenkel
- 2000 – Tom Osborne
- 2002 – Lynne Draper
- 2004 – Barry Switzer
- 2009 – Steve Owens
