= Bob Prewitt =

American basketball player and coach (1924–2018)

Biographical details
- Born: July 26, 1924
- Died: May 3, 2018 (aged 93); Dallas, Texas, U.S.

Playing career
- 1947–1949: SMU

Coaching career (HC unless noted)
- 1949–1967: SMU (assistant)
- 1967–1975: SMU

Head coaching record
- Overall: 88–115 (.433)
- Tournaments: 0–1 (CCAT)

Accomplishments and honors

Championships
- SWC regular season (1972)

Robert I. Prewitt (July 26, 1924 – May 3, 2018) was an American college basketball coach. He was the head coach at Southern Methodist University from 1967 to 1975.

Prewitt served in the Army Air Corps before enrolling at SMU in 1947. He served as team captain for the 1948–49 season, and was an All-Conference pick. Prewitt joined the coaching staff as an assistant in 1949 and helped the team to its first Final Four in 1956. In 1967, he became head coach, and led the team to a Southwest Conference regular-season title in 1972. He died on May 3, 2018, in Dallas, Texas at age 93.

== Head coaching record ==
Record table
Season	Team	Overall	Conference	Standing	Postseason
SMU Mustangs (Southwest Conference) (1967–1975)
1967–68	SMU	6–18	5–9	T–7th	
1968–69	SMU	12–12	8–6	3rd	
1969–70	SMU	5–19	4–10	7th	
1970–71	SMU	16–10	8–6	4th	
1971–72	SMU	16–11	10–4	T–1st	
1972–73	SMU	10–15	7–7	T–5th	
1973–74	SMU	15–12	10–4	T–2nd	CCAT Quarterfinals
1974–75	SMU	8–18	4–10	T–6th	
SMU:		88–115 (.433)	56–56 (.500)		
Total:		88–115 (.433)			
National champion Postseason invitational champion Conference regular season champion Conference regular season and conference tournament champion Division regular season champion Division regular season and conference tournament champion Conference tournament champion
