= Carroll Hooser =

American basketball player (born 1944)

Personal information
- Born: March 5, 1944 (age 82) Dallas, Texas
- Listed height: 6 ft 7 in (2.01 m)
- Listed weight: 230 lb (104 kg)

Career information
- High school: Richardson (Richardson, Texas)
- College: SMU (1963–1966)
- NBA draft: 1966: 6th round, 52nd overall pick
- Drafted by: Detroit Pistons
- Position: Power forward
- Number: 25

Career history
- 1967–1968: Dallas Chaparrals
- Stats at Basketball Reference

Carroll L. Hooser (born March 5, 1944, in Dallas, Texas) is a retired professional basketball power forward who spent one season in the American Basketball Association as a member of the Dallas Chaparrals during the 1967–68 season. He was drafted by the Detroit Pistons during the 1967 NBA draft from Southern Methodist University.
