= Jeryl Sasser =

American basketball player (born 1979)

Personal information
- Born: February 13, 1979 (age 47) Dallas, Texas, U.S.
- Listed height: 6 ft 6 in (1.98 m)
- Listed weight: 200 lb (91 kg)

Career information
- High school: Kimball (Dallas, Texas)
- College: SMU (1997–2001)
- NBA draft: 2001: 1st round, 22nd overall pick
- Drafted by: Orlando Magic
- Playing career: 2001–2009
- Position: Shooting guard
- Number: 5

Career history
- 2001–2003: Orlando Magic
- 2003–2004: Élan Béarnais Pau-Orthez
- 2005: Yakima Sun Kings
- 2005–2006: Bnei HaSharon
- 2007–2009: Al Arabi

Career highlights
- WAC Player of the Year (1999); WAC Freshman of the Year (1998); 2× First-team All-WAC (1999, 2000); 2× Second-team All-WAC (1998, 2001); AP Honorable mention All-American (2000)
- Stats at NBA.com
- Stats at Basketball Reference

Jeryl Henry Braxton Sasser Jr. (born February 13, 1979) is an American former professional basketball player. Sasser played college basketball for the SMU Mustangs and professionally in the National Basketball Association (NBA) for the Orlando Magic.

Born in Dallas, Texas, Sasser graduated from Justin F. Kimball High School and played college basketball at Southern Methodist University (SMU). He was selected by the Orlando Magic as the 22nd overall pick in the 2001 NBA draft.

In two seasons for the Magic (his only time in the NBA) he averaged 2.5 points and 2.3 rebounds per game. Sasser's final NBA game was played in Game 7 of the Eastern Conference First Round on May 4, 2003. In that game, Orlando would drop the series to the Detroit Pistons, losing Game 7 93-108, with Sasser recording 3 points and 1 rebound.

He also played with the Yakima Sun Kings of the Continental Basketball Association, and with French Pro A team Élan Béarnais Pau-Orthez. In November 2005, Sasser signed for Bnei HaSharon in Israel replacing injured Cookie Belcher, but he was released after two games. From 2007 to 2009, he played for Al Arabi in Kuwait, and was a Kuwait League Champion in 2008.

Jeryl Sasser is the younger brother of former NBA player Jason Sasser.

Post-playing Career

After retiring from professional basketball, Sasser became involved in religious teaching. As of 2025, he serves as a teacher and elder with Yah’s Hidden Ones, a religious congregation based in Irving, Texas.
