= 1957 NBA draft =

Basketball player selection

General information
- Sport: Basketball
- Date: April 17, 1957
- Location: St. Louis, Missouri

Overview
- 85 total selections in 14 rounds
- League: NBA
- First selection: Rod Hundley Cincinnati Royals
- Hall of Famers: 1: G Sam Jones

The 1957 NBA draft was the 11th annual draft of the National Basketball Association (NBA). The draft was held on April 17, 1957, before the 1957–58 season. In this draft, eight NBA teams took turns selecting amateur U.S. college basketball players. Prior to the draft, the Fort Wayne Pistons and the Rochester Royals relocated to Detroit and Cincinnati, and became the Detroit Pistons and the Cincinnati Royals respectively. In each round, the teams select in reverse order of their win–loss record in the previous season. The draft consisted of 14 rounds comprising 85 players selected.

== Draft selections and draftee career notes ==
Rod Hundley from West Virginia University was selected first overall by the Cincinnati Royals. However, the Royals immediately traded his draft rights to the Minneapolis Lakers. Eight pick of the draft, Sam Jones from North Carolina Central University, have been inducted to the Basketball Hall of Fame. Woody Sauldsberry, who was selected in the eighth round, went on to win the Rookie of the Year Award in his first season. He would be the highest selected rookie to ever win the award in league history, being selected as the 60th pick in the NBA that year. Jim Brown from Syracuse University was selected in the ninth round by the Syracuse Nationals, but he opted for a professional football career and eventually playing nine successful seasons in the National Football League (NFL). Brown was later inducted to the Pro Football Hall of Fame and is considered one of the greatest professional football players ever.

== Key ==
Pos.	G	F	C
Position	Guard	Forward	Center

^	Denotes player who has been inducted to the Naismith Memorial Basketball Hall of Fame
^{+}	Denotes player who has been selected for at least one All-Star Game
^{#}	Denotes player who has never appeared in an NBA regular-season or playoff game
^{~}	Denotes player who has been selected as Rookie of the Year

== Draft ==
Round	Pick	Player	Position	Nationality	Team	College
1	1	Rod Hundley ^{+}	G	United States	Cincinnati Royals (traded to Minneapolis)^{[a]}	West Virginia
1	2	Charlie Tyra	F/C	United States	Detroit Pistons (traded to New York)^{[b]}	Louisville
1	3	Jim Krebs	C	United States	Minneapolis Lakers	SMU
1	4	Win Wilfong	G	United States	St. Louis Hawks	Memphis State
1	5	Brendan McCann	G	United States	New York Knicks	St. Bonaventure
1	6	Lennie Rosenbluth	F	United States	Philadelphia Warriors	North Carolina
1	7	George Bon Salle	F	United States	Syracuse Nationals	Illinois
1	8	Sam Jones^	G/F	United States	Boston Celtics	NC Central
2	9	Dick Duckett	G	United States	Cincinnati Royals	St. John's
2	10	Bob McCoy^{#}	F	United States	Detroit Pistons	Grambling
2	11	Harv Schmidt^{#}	F	United States	Minneapolis Lakers	Illinois
2	12	Jim Palmer	F/C	United States	St. Louis Hawks	Dayton
2	13	Larry Friend	G/F	United States	New York Knicks	California
2	14	Jack Sullivan^{#}	F	United States	Philadelphia Warriors	Mount St. Mary's
2	15	Jim Morgan^{#}	G	United States	Syracuse Nationals	Louisville
2	16	Dick O'Neal^{#}	F	United States	Boston Celtics	TCU

== Other picks ==
The following list includes other draft picks who have appeared in at least one NBA game.

Round	Pick	Player	Position	Nationality	Team	College
3	17	Jerry Paulson	G	United States	Cincinnati Royals	Manhattan
3	18	Bill Ebben	G	United States	Detroit Pistons	Detroit
4	27	George Brown	F	United States	Minneapolis Lakers	Wayne State
4	30	Ray Radziszewski	F	United States	Philadelphia Warriors	Saint Joseph's
6	48	Maury King	G	United States	Boston Celtics	Kansas
8	57	Doug Bolstorff	G	United States	Detroit Pistons	Minnesota
8	60	Woody Sauldsberry^{+}^{~}	F/C	United States	Philadelphia Warriors	Texas Southern
9	67	Steve Hamilton	F/C	United States	Philadelphia Warriors	Morehead State

== Trades ==
- ^{a} On draft-day, the Minneapolis Lakers acquired the draft rights to first pick Rod Hundley along with Bob Burrow, Ed Fleming, Don Meineke and Art Spoelstra from the Cincinnati Royals in exchange for Clyde Lovellette and Jim Paxson.
- ^{b} Prior to the draft, the New York Knicks acquired the Detroit Pistons' first-round pick, which was used to select Charlie Tyra, along with Mel Hutchins from the Pistons in exchange for Dick Atha, Nathaniel Clifton and Harry Gallatin.

== See also ==
- List of first overall NBA draft picks
