= Jim Krebs =

American basketball player (1935–1965)

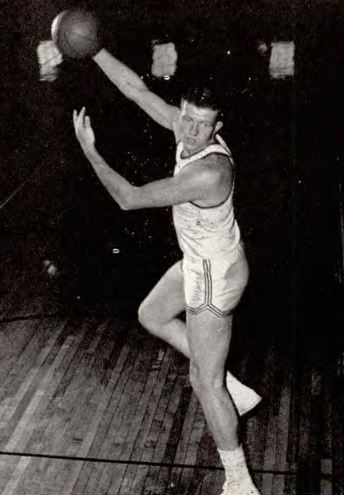
- Krebs as a junior at SMU

Personal information
- Born: September 8, 1935 Webster Groves, Missouri, U.S.
- Died: May 6, 1965 (aged 29) Woodland Hills, California, U.S.
- Listed height: 6 ft 8 in (2.03 m)
- Listed weight: 230 lb (104 kg)

Career information
- High school: Webster Groves (Webster Groves, Missouri)
- College: SMU (1954–1957)
- NBA draft: 1957: 1st round, 3rd overall pick
- Drafted by: Minneapolis Lakers
- Playing career: 1957–1964
- Position: Center
- Number: 32

Career history
- 1957–1964: Minneapolis / Los Angeles Lakers

Career highlights
- Consensus first-team All-American (1957)

Career NBA statistics
- Points: 4,128 (8.0 ppg)
- Rebounds: 3,177 (6.2 rpg)
- Assists: 429 (0.8 apg)
- Stats at NBA.com
- Stats at Basketball Reference

James Krebs (September 8, 1935 – May 6, 1965) was an American basketball player. A 6-foot-8-inch (2.03 m) power forward/center, he starred for the SMU Mustangs during the mid-1950s and later played with the Minneapolis/Los Angeles Lakers of the NBA. He died in a tree falling accident at the age of 29.

== Early life and college ==
Krebs was born in Webster Groves, Missouri. While representing Webster Groves High School in a St. Louis-area all-star game, he attracted the attention of Doc Hayes, the men's basketball coach at Southern Methodist University in Texas. Hayes convinced Krebs to sign with SMU, and recruited two fellow Missourans to play alongside him.

Described as a "cautious, careful player" with an "unstoppable hook shot," Krebs became the star of the Mustangs and one of the best players in the nation. He scored 1,753 points in his three varsity seasons (1954–1957), led the Mustangs to three consecutive Southwest Conference championships, and was named to three All-SWC teams. Coach Hayes' strategy was simple: "[W]hen Jim is free, feed it to the big man."

In 1956, Krebs' team reached the NCAA National Semifinals, where they faced Bill Russell and the University of San Francisco. SMU lost 68–86, but Krebs did outscore future Hall of Famer Russell 24–17. The next year, Krebs earned consensus All-American honors and appeared on the cover of Sports Illustrated with the headline: "Big Jim and the Texas Boom". His team reached the NCAA Tournament once again that spring, but they were defeated 73–65 by Wilt Chamberlain and the University of Kansas in the Midwestern semifinals.

During Krebs' collegiate career, basketball became so popular at SMU that the school constructed a new, $2.25 million basketball arena in 1956 — Moody Coliseum, which the Mustangs use to this day. Other schools in the Southwest Conference, who had mainly emphasized college football, took notice of Krebs' success and increased funding for their own basketball programs.

== NBA ==
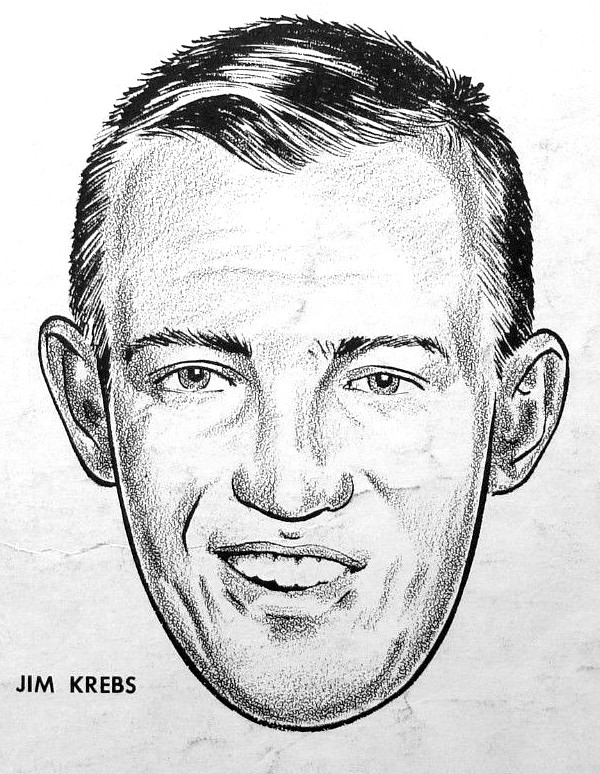
Krebs depicted with the Lakers.

After his senior season at SMU, Krebs was selected by the Minneapolis Lakers with the third overall pick in the 1957 NBA draft. He played with the Lakers (who moved to Los Angeles in 1960) for seven seasons, mostly in a reserve role behind Vern Mikkelsen, Larry Foust or Rudy LaRusso. The team reached the NBA Finals three times (1959, 1962 and 1963), but lost each series to the Boston Celtics. Over his career, Krebs posted statistics of 8.0 points per game, 6.2 rebounds per game and 0.8 assists per game. His statistically strongest season occurred in 1961–62, when he averaged 10.0 points and 7.9 rebounds.

Krebs occasionally struggled with foul trouble while in the NBA. He once ranked ninth in the league in personal fouls, and committed a playoff-record five fouls in one quarter during the fifth game of the 1963 NBA Finals. Krebs also engaged in several fights with opposing players, including Boston's Bill Russell and St. Louis' Bob Pettit. Indeed, Russell once wrote, "Jim Krebs was known in the league as a man who was willing to go beyond the rules in getting his man." Though he could be aggressive on the court, teammates described Krebs as fun-loving and charismatic. Los Angeles Times sportswriter Jim Murray once wrote, "Time and again I've seen him make a team that was about to cry, laugh."

=== Plane crash survivor ===
On one evening in 1960, the Lakers' team plane experienced electrical problems and crashed into a field near Carroll, Iowa. All the passengers survived, and Krebs later wrote an account of the crash for Sports Illustrated. His article took a humorous tone. Describing a hearse which arrived at the scene, he wrote, "I'm positive I detected a slightly disappointed look when the driver found out everyone was all right." He also joked that his wife asked him, "Where have you been? Carol who?" when he called home to report what happened.

== Post-basketball ==
After retiring from basketball in 1964, Krebs became a loan officer at a bank in Beverly Hills, California. He built a home for his wife and children in Woodland Hills.

Krebs apparently was afraid of death, remarking to teammates that he believed he wouldn't live to 33. On May 6, 1965, Krebs was suddenly killed while trying to remove a tree that had fallen onto his neighbor's roof during a storm. A limb from the tree struck him in the head as it fell from the roof in an uncontrolled fashion that crushed his skull and chest. His wife was pregnant with a son, who was born two months later.

Krebs was posthumously elected to the Texas Sports Hall of Fame in 1976. His number 32 jersey was retired at SMU in 2002.

== Career statistics ==
Legend
GP	Games played	GS	Games started	MPG	Minutes per game
FG%	Field goal percentage	3P%	3-point field goal percentage	FT%	Free throw percentage
RPG	Rebounds per game	APG	Assists per game	SPG	Steals per game
BPG	Blocks per game	PPG	Points per game	**Bold**	Career high
*	Led the league

=== NBA ===
==== Regular season ====
Year	Team	GP	MPG	FG%	FT%	RPG	APG	PPG
1957–58	Minneapolis	68	18.5	.378	.767	7.4	.4	7.8
1958–59	Minneapolis	72*	21.9	.399	.748	6.8	.7	8.8
1959–60	Minneapolis	75	16.9	.392	.721	4.4	.5	7.6
1960–61	L.A. Lakers	75	22.1	.392	**.806**	6.1	.9	8.2
1961–62	L.A. Lakers	78	**25.2**	**.445**	.750	**7.9**	**1.4**	**10.0**
1962–63	L.A. Lakers	**79**	24.2	.434	.747	6.4	1.1	8.3
1963–64	L.A. Lakers	68	14.3	.375	.765	4.2	.7	4.9
Career		515	20.7	.405	.755	6.2	.8	8.0

==== Playoffs ====
Year	Team	GP	MPG	FG%	FT%	RPG	APG	PPG
1959	Minneapolis	**13***	16.4	.350	**.957**	5.9	.4	7.2
1960	Minneapolis	9	17.4	.418	.500	5.2	.9	5.7
1961	L.A. Lakers	12*	15.3	.340	.778	5.0	.8	3.8
1962	L.A. Lakers	11	**29.7**	.333	.846	**9.3**	**1.9**	**7.5**
1963	L.A. Lakers	**13***	15.3	.340	.667	3.1	.3	3.2
1964	L.A. Lakers	4	12.5	**.667**	.500	5.5	1.5	3.5
Career		62	18.2	.362	.781	5.6	.9	5.3
