= 1955–56 Oklahoma City Chiefs men's basketball team =

American college basketball season

1955–56 Oklahoma City Chiefs men's basketball

NCAA tournament, Elite Eight
- Conference: Independent

Ranking
- Coaches: No. 16
- AP: No. 11
- Record: 20–7
- Head coach: Abe Lemons (1st season)
- Home arena: Municipal Auditorium

The 1955–56 Oklahoma City Chiefs men's basketball team represented Oklahoma City University in the 1955–56 NCAA men's basketball season as an independent. They finished the season 20–7 overall record, and made it to the Elite Eight of the 1956 NCAA basketball tournament. They were coached by Abe Lemons in his first season as head coach of the Chiefs. They played their home games at the Municipal Auditorium in Oklahoma City, Oklahoma.

== Schedule ==
Date time, TV	Rank^{#}	Opponent^{#}	Result	Record	Site city, state
Regular season
		Emporia State	W 63–44	1–0	Municipal Auditorium; Oklahoma City, OK
December 5, 1955		TCU	W 84–56	2–0	Municipal Auditorium; Oklahoma City, OK
December 15, 1955	No. 20	Wyoming	W 65–59	3–0	Municipal Auditorium; Oklahoma City, OK
December 17, 1955	No. 20	Western Kentucky	W 92–87	4–0	Municipal Auditorium; Oklahoma City, OK
December 20, 1955	No. 15	Auburn	W 76–58	5–0	Municipal Auditorium; Oklahoma City, OK
December 23, 1955	No. 15	TCU	W 64–54	6–0	Fort Worth, TX
December 27, 1955	No. 10	Penn; All-College Basketball Tournament	W 74–62	7–0	Municipal Auditorium; Oklahoma City, OK
December 28, 1955	No. 10	Oklahoma A&M; All-College Basketball Tournament	W 48–47	8–0	Municipal Auditorium; Oklahoma City, OK
December 29, 1955	No. 10	Tulsa; All-College Basketball Tournament	L 58–65	8–1	Municipal Auditorium; Oklahoma City, OK
January 4, 1956		at No. 15 Tulsa	W 58–50	9–1	Municipal Auditorium; Tulsa, OK
January 9, 1956		at Houston	L 64–78	9–2	Public School Field House; Houston, TX
January 14, 1956	No. 16	at Drake	W 78–74	10–2	Drake Fieldhouse; Des Moines, IA
January 17, 1956	No. 14	at Seattle	L 84–89	10–3	Seattle, WA
January 18, 1956	No. 14	at Seattle	W 74–70	11–3	Seattle, WA
January 20, 1956	No. 14	at No. 16 Utah	L 58–60	11–4	Nielsen Fieldhouse; Salt Lake City, UT
January 21, 1956	No. 14	at BYU	W 62–60	12–4	Smith Fieldhouse; Provo, UT
January 24, 1956	No. 16	at Wichita	W 56–55	13–4	University of Wichita Field House; Wichita, KS
January 30, 1956	No. 16	Texas A&M	W 76–56	14–4	Municipal Auditorium; Oklahoma City, OK
February 1, 1956	No. 15	at Loyola (LA)	W 81–66	15–4	Loyola Field House; New Orleans, LA
February 6, 1956	No. 15	Wichita	W 63–59	16–4	Municipal Auditorium; Oklahoma City, OK
February 13, 1956	No. 14	Drake	L 66–70	16–5	Municipal Auditorium; Oklahoma City, OK
February 20, 1956	No. 14	Loyola (LA)	W 93–78	17–5	Municipal Auditorium; Oklahoma City, OK
February 24, 1956	No. 18	Seattle	L 63–70	17–6	Municipal Auditorium; Oklahoma City, OK
February 27, 1956	No. 18	No. 14 Houston	W 63–59	18–6	Municipal Auditorium; Oklahoma City, OK
NCAA Tournament
March 13, 1956	No. 16	vs. Memphis State; First round	W 97–81	19–6	University of Wichita Field House; Wichita, KS
March 16, 1956	No. 11	vs. Kansas State; West Regional semifinal	W 97–93	20–6	Allen Fieldhouse; Lawrence, KS
March 17, 1956	No. 11	vs. No. 7 SMU; West Regional final	L 63–84	20–7	Allen Fieldhouse; Lawrence, KS
*Non-conference game. ^{#}Rankings from AP Poll. (#) Tournament seedings in parentheses. W=West Region. All times are in Central Time.

== Rankings ==
Ranking movements Legend: ██ Increase in ranking ██ Decrease in ranking — = Not ranked
	Week														
Poll	Pre	1	2	3	4	5	6	7	8	9	10	11	12	13	Final
AP	12	20	15	10	—	16	14	16	15	14	14	18	16	16	11
