= 1955–56 Texas Tech Red Raiders basketball team =

American college basketball season

1955–56 Texas Tech Red Raiders basketball

Border Conference regular season champion

NCAA Division I men's basketball tournament First round, L, 68–67 v. SMU
- Conference: Border Intercollegiate Athletic Association
- Record: 12–12 (8–4 Border)
- Head coach: Polk Robison (9th season)

The 1955–56 Texas Tech Red Raiders men's basketball team represented Texas Tech University in the Border Intercollegiate Athletic Association during the 1955–56 NCAA men's basketball season. This was Texas Tech's last year in the Border Conference before becoming members of the Southwest Conference. The head coach was Polk Robison, his 9th year with the team.
