= Denny Holman =

American basketball player

Personal information
- Born: October 8, 1945 (age 81)
- Listed height: 6 ft 3 in (1.91 m)
- Listed weight: 175 lb (79 kg)

Career information
- High school: Hillcrest (Dallas, Texas)
- College: SMU (1964–1967)
- NBA draft: 1967: undrafted
- Position: Point guard
- Number: 15, 20

Career history
- 1967–1968: Dallas Chaparrals

Career highlights
- SWC Player of the Year (1967)
- Stats at Basketball Reference

Dennis R. Holman (born October 8, 1945) is a former basketball player for the Dallas Chaparrals of the American Basketball Association (ABA). In his one season with Dallas, he averaged 3.8 points, 1.7 rebounds, and 1.6 assists per game. Holman played college basketball for the SMU Mustangs.
