= Doc Hayes =

American basketball coach (1906–1973)

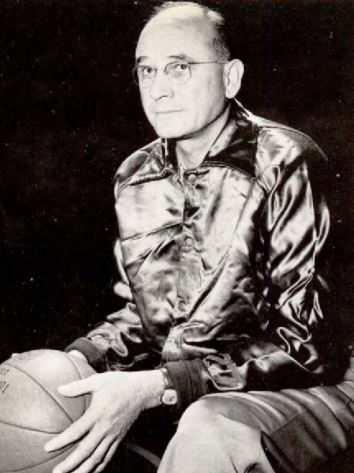

Biographical details
- Born: 1906; Krum, Texas, U.S.
- Died: February 26, 1973 (aged 67); Terrell, Texas, U.S.

Playing career
- 1926–1928: North Texas

Coaching career (HC unless noted)
- 1928–1947: Crozier Tech HS
- 1947–1967: SMU

Head coaching record
- Overall: 298–191 (college)
- Tournaments: 7–8 (NCAA / NCAA University Division)

Accomplishments and honors

Championships
- 8 SWC regular season (1955–1958, 1962, 1965–1967)

Awards
- SMU's Athletics Hall of Fame (2012)

E. O. "Doc" Hayes (1906 – February 26, 1973) was an American basketball coach. He served as head basketball coach at Southern Methodist University (SMU) from 1947 to 1967, during which time, his teams won eight Southwest Conference (SWC) titles and reached six NCAA Tournaments. In 1956, Hayes' Mustangs, led by Jim Krebs, made the only Final Four appearance in program history.

Eighteen of Hayes' players earned a total of thirty All-SWC honors, and two players earned All-America honors. Hayes is a member of The Texas Sports Hall of Fame, and will be inducted into SMU's Athletics Hall of Fame on May 18, 2012. He died in 1973.

Regarding the rule that coaches must remain seated during a game, Hayes was quoted as saying: "If you've got 10,000 people seated in an arena and everybody's standing up and hollering and you expect the coaches and players to be quiet and relaxed, you're going to have to give them a sedative. Then the coach probably will be fired at the end of the season and the players cut off their scholarships."

Hayes and his wife, Kathleen, were killed in a one-car accident near Terrell, Texas on February 26, 1973.

== Head coaching record ==
=== College ===
Statistics overview
Season	Team	Overall	Conference	Standing	Postseason
SMU Mustangs (Southwest Conference) (1947–1967)
1947–48	SMU	13–10	5–7	5th	
1948–49	SMU	11–13	5–7	5th	
1949–50	SMU	10–13	7–5	3rd	
1950–51	SMU	14–10	6–6	5th	
1951–52	SMU	11–13	5–7	T–3rd	
1952–53	SMU	8–12	4–8	T–5th	
1953–54	SMU	13–9	6–6	T–3rd	
1954–55	SMU	15–10	9–3	1st	NCAA Regional Fourth Place
1955–56	SMU	25–4	12–0	1st	NCAA Fourth Place
1956–57	SMU	22–4	11–1	1st	NCAA University Division Regional Third Place
1957–58	SMU	15–10	9–5	T–1st	
1958–59	SMU	16–8	10–4	2nd	
1959–60	SMU	17–7	10–4	T–2nd	
1960–61	SMU	12–12	6–8	6th	
1961–62	SMU	18–7	11–3	T–1st	
1962–63	SMU	12–12	6–8	T–5th	
1963–64	SMU	12–12	8–6	T–3rd	
1964–65	SMU	17–10	10–4	T–1st	NCAA University Division Regional Third Place
1965–66	SMU	17–9	11–3	1st	NCAA University Division Regional Third Place
1966–67	SMU	20–6	12–2	1st	NCAA University Division Elite Eight
SMU:		298–191 (.609)	163–97 (.627)		
Total:		298–191 (.609)			
National champion Postseason invitational champion Conference regular season champion Conference regular season and conference tournament champion Division regular season champion Division regular season and conference tournament champion Conference tournament champion

== See also ==
- List of NCAA Division I Men's Final Four appearances by coach
