= Gerald Lewis (basketball) =

American basketball player

Personal information
- Born: March 25, 1971 (age 55) New Orleans, Louisiana
- Listed height: 6 ft 3 in (191 cm)

Career information
- College: SMU (1989–1993)
- NBA draft: 1993: undrafted
- Playing career: 1993–2000
- Position: Guard

Career history
- KK Kantrida
- KK Zadar
- Slovakofarma Pezinok

Gerald Lewis (born March 25, 1971) is an American retired basketball player. A 6'3" guard, he led the Euroleague in steals during the 1998–99 season with 2.5 per game. It was his first and last participation in the competition, playing for KK Zadar.

Lewis is a 1989 graduate of St. Martin's Episcopal School in Metairie, Louisiana. He was inducted into the school's Alumni Athletic Hall of Fame in 2011. From 1989 to 1993, Lewis played for the SMU Mustangs men's basketball team.

Lewis has also worked as an assistant coach for the New Mexico State Aggies and Southeastern Louisiana Lions. He coached at David W. Carter High School before joining St. Augustine High School.
