= Hal Lear =

American basketball player (1935–2016)

Personal information
- Born: January 31, 1935 Philadelphia, Pennsylvania, U.S.
- Died: June 25, 2016 (aged 81) White Plains, New York, U.S.
- Listed height: 6 ft 0 in (1.83 m)
- Listed weight: 163 lb (74 kg)

Career information
- High school: Overbrook (Philadelphia, Pennsylvania)
- College: Temple (1953–1956)
- NBA draft: 1956: 1st round, 7th overall pick
- Drafted by: Philadelphia Warriors
- Playing career: 1956–1967
- Position: Point guard
- Number: 16

Career history
- 1956: Philadelphia Warriors
- 1956–1961: Easton Madisons
- 1961–1962: Los Angeles Jets
- 1962–1965: Camden Bullets
- 1965–1966: Johnstown C-J's
- 1966–1967: New Haven Elms

Career highlights
- 2× EPBL champion (1960, 1964); EPBL Most Valuable Player (1957); 4× All-EPBL First Team (1957, 1959–1961); 2× All-EPBL Second Team (1958, 1965); Third-team All-American – Collier's (1956); NCAA Tournament Most Outstanding Player (1956); No. 6 retired by Temple Owls
- Stats at NBA.com
- Stats at Basketball Reference

Harold C. Lear Jr. (January 31, 1935 – June 25, 2016) was an American professional basketball player.

== Biography ==
A 6 ft 0 in (1.83 m) guard born in Philadelphia, Lear starred at Temple University in his hometown during the 1950s. He earned the NCAA basketball tournament Most Outstanding Player in 1956 after leading Temple to the Final Four, where they lost to the University of Iowa.

After college, Lear was selected by the Philadelphia Warriors with the seventh pick of the 1956 NBA draft. His NBA career was brief, however: he appeared in just three games during the 1956–57 NBA season and scored four points. He played for the Easton Madisons of the Eastern Professional Basketball League (EPBL) and was named the league's Most Valuable Player in 1957.

Lear won EPBL championships with the Madisons in 1960 and the Camden Bullets in 1964. He was a four-time selection to the All-EPBL First Team and two-time selection to the Second Team.

In 2013, Temple retired his No. 6 jersey.

== Death ==
Lear died on June 25, 2016, at his home in White Plains, New York, after an illness.

== Career statistics ==
Legend
| GP | Games played | GS | Games started | MPG | Minutes per game |
| FG% | Field goal percentage | 3P% | 3-point field goal percentage | FT% | Free throw percentage |
| RPG | Rebounds per game | APG | Assists per game | SPG | Steals per game |
| BPG | Blocks per game | PPG | Points per game | **Bold** | Career high |

=== NBA ===
==== Regular season ====
| Year | Team | GP | MPG | FG% | FT% | RPG | APG | PPG |
|---|---|---|---|---|---|---|---|---|
| 1956–57 | Philadelphia | 3 | 4.7 | .333 | – | .3 | .3 | 1.3 |
