= Gene Phillips (basketball) =

American basketball player

Personal information
- Born: October 25, 1948 (age 78) Livingston, Texas, U.S.
- Listed height: 6 ft 4 in (1.93 m)
- Listed weight: 175 lb (79 kg)

Career information
- High school: Jones (Houston, Texas)
- College: SMU (1968–1971)
- NBA draft: 1971: 7th round, 119th overall pick
- Drafted by: Milwaukee Bucks
- Position: Shooting guard
- Number: 13

Career history
- 1971–1972: Dallas Chaparrals

Career highlights
- SWC Player of the Year (1970); 3× First-team All-SWC (1969–1971)
- Stats at Basketball Reference

Gene Phillips (born October 25, 1948) is an American former professional basketball player. Phillips played college basketball for the SMU Mustangs and played professionally for the Dallas Chaparrals from 1971 to 1972.

== Biography ==
Phillips was born in Livingston, Texas. He attended Jones High School in Houston, Texas.

== Career ==
Phillips played for the Dallas Chaparrals of the American Basketball Association (ABA). Previously, he had been drafted by the Milwaukee Bucks in the seventh round of the 1971 NBA draft.

He played at the collegiate level at Southern Methodist University.
