= Ira Terrell =

American basketball player

Personal information
- Born: June 19, 1954 (age 72) Dallas, Texas, U.S.
- Listed height: 6 ft 8 in (2.03 m)
- Listed weight: 200 lb (91 kg)

Career information
- High school: Franklin D. Roosevelt (Dallas, Texas)
- College: SMU (1972–1976)
- NBA draft: 1976: 3rd round, 45th overall pick
- Drafted by: Phoenix Suns
- Playing career: 1976–1979
- Position: Power forward / center
- Number: 32, 34, 33

Career history
- 1976–1977: Phoenix Suns
- 1978–1979: New Orleans Jazz
- 1979: Portland Trail Blazers

Career highlights
- SWC Player of the Year (1976); Third-team Parade All-American (1972)
- Stats at NBA.com
- Stats at Basketball Reference

Ira Edmondson Terrell (born June 19, 1954) is an American former professional basketball player. Terrell played college basketball for the SMU Mustangs and professionally in the National Basketball Association (NBA) for the Phoenix Suns, New Orleans Jazz, and Portland Trail Blazers.

A 6'8" power forward from Dallas' Roosevelt High School and Southern Methodist University, Terrell played in the National Basketball Association from 1976 to 1979 as a member of the Phoenix Suns, New Orleans Jazz and Portland Trail Blazers. He averaged 7.0 points per game and 4.2 rebounds per game in his career.

== Career statistics ==
Legend
GP	Games played	GS	Games started	MPG	Minutes per game
FG%	Field goal percentage	3P%	3-point field goal percentage	FT%	Free throw percentage
RPG	Rebounds per game	APG	Assists per game	SPG	Steals per game
BPG	Blocks per game	PPG	Points per game	**Bold**	Career high

=== NBA ===
==== Regular season ====
Year	Team	GP	MPG	FG%	FT%	RPG	APG	SPG	BPG	PPG
1976–77	Houston	**78**	**22.4**	.508	.631	**5.0**	**1.3**	**.5**	.6	**8.5**
1978–79	New Orleans	31	18.5	.438	**.711**	3.5	.8	**.5**	**.7**	4.9
1978–79	Portland	18	8.9	**.556**	.533	2.1	.8	.4	.3	3.8
Career		127	19.6	.498	.638	4.2	1.1	.5	.6	7.0

==== Playoffs ====
Year	Team	GP	MPG	FG%	FT%	RPG	APG	SPG	BPG	PPG
1979	Portland	1	6.0	.000	–	2.0	.0	.0	.0	.0
