= SMU Mustangs men's basketball =

Team of Southern Methodist University

2026–27 SMU Mustangs men's basketball team
- University: Southern Methodist University
- First season: 1916–17; 110 years ago
- Athletic director: Damon Evans
- Head coach: Andy Enfield; 3rd season, 45–25 (.643)
- Location: University Park, Texas (Note: Almost all of the SMU campus is located in University Park, a separate city within the Dallas city limits. All locations in University Park have a Dallas mailing address.)
- Arena: Moody Coliseum (capacity: 7,000)
- NCAA division: Division I
- Conference: ACC
- Nickname: Mustangs
- Colors: Red and blue
- Student section: The Stampede
- All-time record: 1,475–1,311 (.529)
- NCAA tournament record: 10–15 (.400)

NCAA Division I tournament Final Four
- 1956
Other NCAA Division I tournament results
Elite Eight	1956, 1967
Sweet Sixteen	1955, 1956, 1957, 1965, 1966, 1967
Appearances	1955, 1956, 1957, 1965, 1966, 1967, 1984, 1985, 1988, 1993, 2015, 2017, 2026

Conference tournament champions
- SWC: 1988 AAC: 2015, 2017

Conference regular-season champions
- TIAA: 1917 SWC: 1935, 1937, 1955, 1956, 1957, 1958, 1962, 1965, 1966, 1967, 1972, 1988, 1993 AAC: 2015, 2017

Uniforms
Home	Away	Alternate

The SMU Mustangs men's basketball team represents Southern Methodist University (SMU) in University Park, Texas and competes in the Atlantic Coast Conference of NCAA Division I college basketball. SMU first fielded a team in the 1916–17 season, and its all-time record is 1,475–1,311. SMU has reached one Final Four, made 13 NCAA Tournament appearances, won 16 conference regular season championships, had 12 All-Americans, and had 25 players selected in the NBA draft.

SMU finished the 2016–17 season with a 30–5 record, and won their second conference title in three years. They set the school record for single season wins, and returned to the NCAA Tournament following a postseason ban in the 2015–16 season. In 2026, under head coach Andy Enfield, the Mustangs returned to the NCAA Tournament for the first time since 2017.

== History ==
=== 1916: The Beginning ===
1916 was the inaugural season of SMU basketball where it went 12–2. SMU joined the Southwest Conference in the 1918–19 season. SMU won its first two conference titles in 1935 and 1937.

=== 1955–1967: The Doc Hayes Era (Golden Era of Pony Hoops) ===
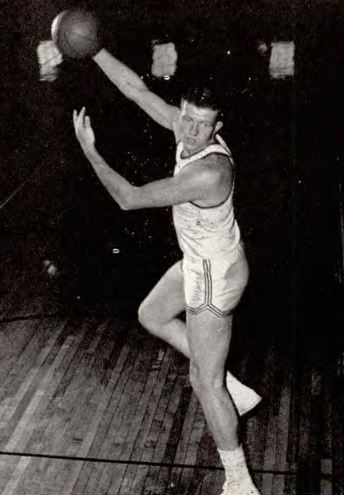
All-American Jim Krebs powered Mustang teams in the mid 1950s.

Doc Hayes took over as SMU's head coach in 1947. By 1955 Hayes had SMU in the NCAA Tournament for the first time in school history advancing to the Sweet Sixteen and had won their first conference title in almost 20 years. The four year stretch from 1955–58, SMU went 77–28, won four consecutive Southwest Conference championships, and reached 3 Sweet Sixteen's while also reaching the school's only ever Final Four in the 1955-56 season, led by All-American Jim Krebs. SMU during the Doc Hayes era won 8 SWC championships and reached the NCAA tournament 6 times including Final Four and Elite Eight appearances. Doc Hayes retired after the 1967 season with a final record of 298–191 (.609) at SMU.

=== 1968–1993: The Fall to Mediocrity ===
Following Doc Hayes, SMU basketball fell down into a period of mediocrity with some sprinkled success highlighted by SMU greats Jon Koncak, Ira Terrell, and Gene Phillips. Though the Bob Prewitt and Sonny Allen eras were largely unsuccessful and only produced one Southwest Conference Championship during a stretch between 1968 and 1980 the program looked to be back on the rise during the Dave Bliss era. Bliss and star big man Jon Koncak led SMU to 3 NCAA tournament appearances and an NIT appearance. The Dave Bliss era was highlighted by his final season where SMU went 28–7 winning the SWC regular season and tournament championships and making it to the Second round of the NCAA Tournament. SMU would win the SWC Championship and reach the NCAA tournament one more time in the 1993 season under John Shumate, however, this was the start of the Dark Ages of SMU basketball.

=== 1994–2012: The Dark Ages ===
This period was the dark age for SMU basketball. From 1994 to 2012 SMU had just seven winning seasons and did not win any conference titles or reach the NCAA tournament. The Mustangs only reached the NIT and CIT once each during these nineteen years.

=== 2012–2016: The Larry Brown Era ===
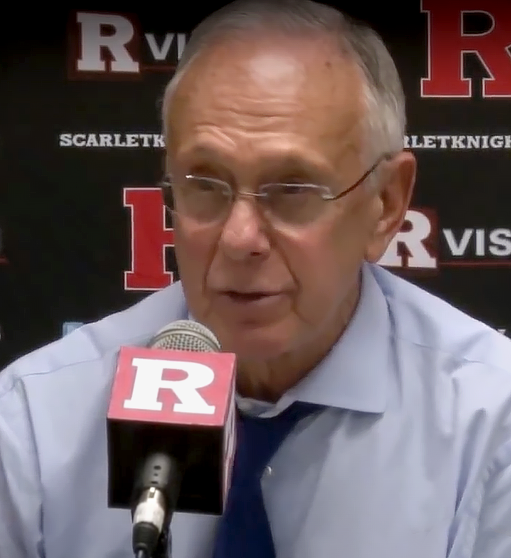
Former SMU coach Larry Brown

The reemergence of SMU basketball occurred when Hall of Fame coach Larry Brown took over the Mustangs in the 2012 season, coinciding with the $48 million renovation of Moody Coliseum. By his second season, he had led SMU to a 27–10 record, and to a championship appearance in the NIT. In his third season, (2014–15) led by Nic Moore, SMU won its first conference title in 22 years (regular season and tournament champions), and returned to the NCAA tournament, losing a controversial game to UCLA on a goaltending call. In the 2015–16 season, SMU was banned from postseason play due to NCAA violations, but still managed to start the season with an unprecedented 18–0 record, peaking at the #8 spot in the AP Poll, and finish the season at 25–5. It was SMU's third straight 25+ win season. In the summer of 2016, Brown stepped down as SMU's basketball coach unexpectedly, finishing with a record of 85–39(.685). He currently holds the third-highest W-L percentage of any head coach in SMU basketball history.

=== 2016–2024: Maintaining Success (Post Larry Brown) ===
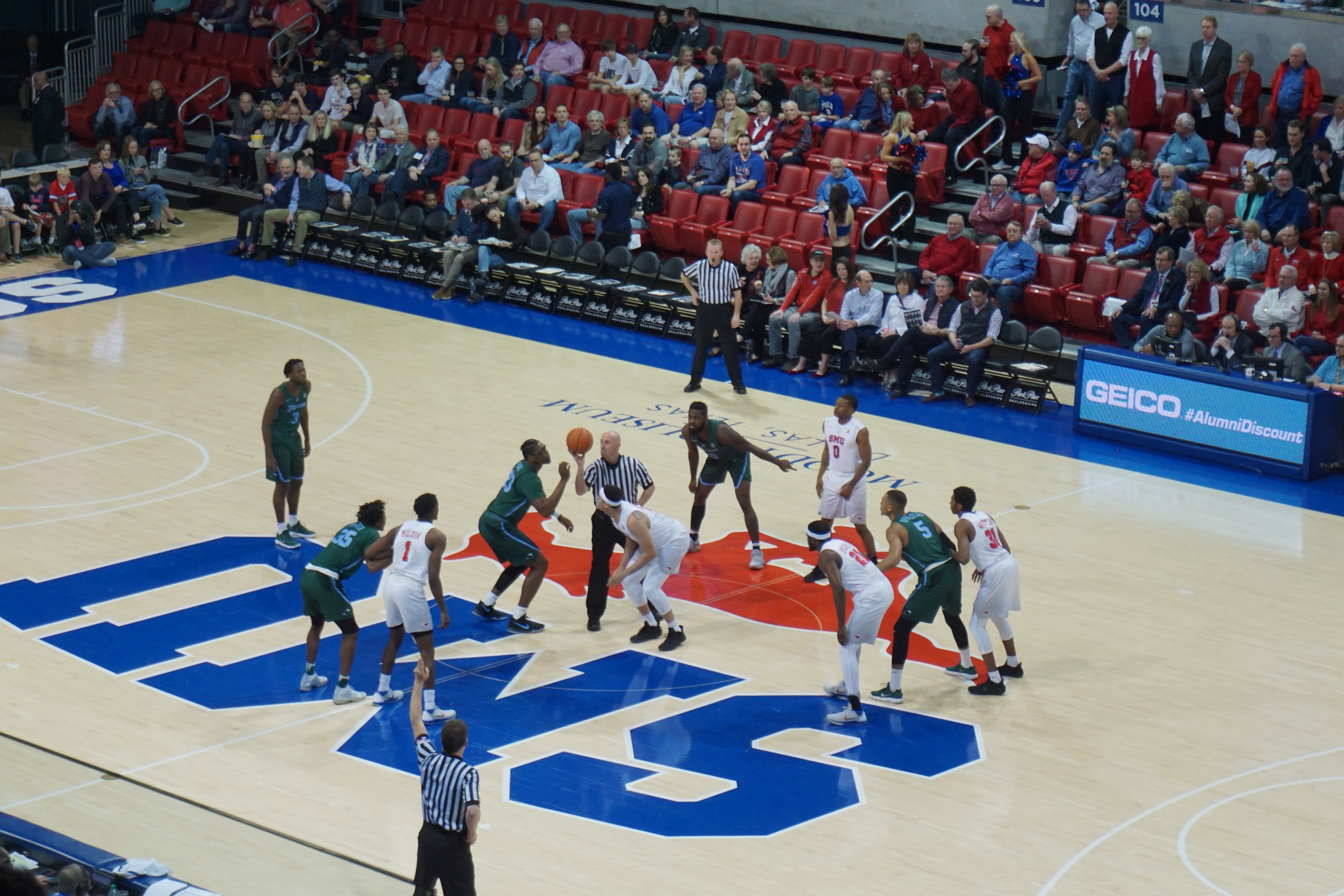
SMU in action against the Tulane Green Wave in 2018

Tim Jankovich took over in the summer of 2016 following the departure of Larry Brown. In his first full season as SMU's head coach, SMU achieved a 30–5 overall record, including a 17–1 in-conference record, and finished ranked #11 in the AP Poll. The Mustangs won the 2016–17 American Athletic Conference regular season and conference tournament titles, and received a bid to the NCAA tournament as a 6 seed, where they were upset by 11th seeded USC by one point in the opening round.

Following the season, Junior standout Semi Ojeleye announced that he would not be returning for his final year, joining seniors Sterling Brown and Ben Moore in entering the NBA draft where both Ojeleye and Brown were selected 37th and 46th overall, respectively. Ben Moore spent 27 games with the G League team, Fort Wayne Mad Ants where he averaged 11.4 points per game and 6.7 rebounds per game. He was signed to a two way contract with the Indiana Pacers on January 12, 2018. This marked the first time an SMU player had been drafted since 2001. This was also the first time SMU had ever had 3 players join their first NBA rosters in the same season, topping the previous high of 1. After a season cut short by an injury to his right hand, in which he averaged 18.0 points (3rd in the AAC), 4.4 assists (3rd), and 1.4 steals (10th) per game while shooting 43.4% from three-point range (5th) and 84.7% from the free throw line (2nd), junior guard Shake Milton was drafted in the 2018 NBA draft and began his career playing for the Philadelphia 76ers.

=== 2024–present: Move to the ACC and the Andy Enfield Era ===
In July 2024, SMU left The American for the Atlantic Coast Conference, returning SMU to the power-conference ranks for the first time since the collapse of the Southwest Conference. The Mustangs entered the ACC under new head coach Andy Enfield, who was hired from USC in 2024.

In their first ACC season, the 2024–25 Mustangs went 24–11 and 13–7 in conference play, finishing in a three-way tie for fourth place, and reached the second round of the NIT. In 2025–26, SMU defeated twelfth-ranked North Carolina and twenty-first ranked Louisville, recording two wins over top-25 opponents in the same season for the first time in six seasons, and was ranked in the AP Top 25 for the first time in nine seasons. The Mustangs finished 20–14 and received an at-large bid to the 2026 NCAA tournament, the program's first appearance since 2017, where they lost to Miami (OH) in the First Four. Following the season, Jaron Pierre Jr. was selected 58th overall by the New Orleans Pelicans in the 2026 NBA draft, the program's first draft pick since 2018.

The 2026–27 Mustangs began Enfield's third season with a heavily rebuilt roster after ten players departed, including all five starters.

== SMU career records ==
Games Played	Sterling Brown — 136 games
Rebounds	Jon Koncak — 1,169 rebounds
Assists	Butch Moore — 828 assists
Steals	Bryan Hopkins — 225 steals
Blocks	Jon Koncak — 278 blocks
Points Scored	Jeryl Sasser — 1992 points
Career Wins	Sterling Brown — 109 wins

== Postseason ==
=== Complete NCAA tournament results ===
The Mustangs have appeared in 13 NCAA Tournaments. Their combined record is 10–15.

The NCAA began seeding the tournament with the 1978 edition.

Year	Seed	Round	Opponent	Result
1955		Sweet Sixteen; Regional 3rd Place Game	Bradley; Tulsa	L 79–81; L 67–68
1956		First Round; Sweet Sixteen; Elite Eight; Final Four; National 3rd Place Game	Texas Tech; Houston; Oklahoma City; San Francisco; Temple	W 68–67; W 89–74; W 84–63; L 68–86; L 81–90
1957		Sweet Sixteen; Regional 3rd Place Game	Kansas; Saint Louis	L 65–73 ^{OT} W 78–68
1965		Sweet Sixteen; Regional 3rd Place Game	Wichita State; Houston	L 81–86; W 89–87
1966		Sweet Sixteen; Regional 3rd Place Game	Kansas; Cincinnati	L 70–76; W 89–84
1967		Sweet Sixteen; Elite Eight	Louisville; Houston	W 83–81; L 75–83
1984	#9	First Round; Second Round	#8 Miami (OH) #1 Georgetown	W 83–69; L 36–37
1985	#5	First Round; Second Round	#12 Old Dominion #4 Loyola–Chicago	W 85–68; L 57–70
1988	#7	First Round; Second Round	#10 Notre Dame #2 Duke	W 83–75; L 79–94
1993	#10	First Round	#7 BYU	L 71–80
2015	#6	First Round	#11 UCLA	L 59–60
2017	#6	First Round	#11 USC	L 65–66
2026	#11	First Four	#11 Miami (OH)	L 79–89

=== NIT results ===
The Mustangs have appeared in seven National Invitation Tournaments (NIT). Their combined record is 6–7.

Year	Round	Opponent	Result
1986	First Round	BYU	L 63–67
2000	First Round	Missouri State	L 64–77
2014	First Round; Second Round; Quarterfinals; Semifinals; Final	UC Irvine; LSU; California; Clemson; Minnesota	W 68–54; W 80–67; W 67–65; W 65–59; L 63–65
2021	First Round	Boise State	L 84–85
2022	First Round; Second Round	Nicholls; Washington State	W 68–58; L 63–75
2024	First Round	Indiana State	L 92–101
2025	First Round; Second Round	Northern Iowa; Oklahoma State	W 73–63; L 83–85

=== CIT results ===
The Mustangs have appeared in one CollegeInsider.com Postseason Tournament (CIT). Their record is 3–1.

Year	Round	Opponent	Result
2011	First Round; Second Round; Quarterfinals; Semifinals	Oral Roberts; Jacksonville; Northern Iowa; Santa Clara	W 64–57 ^{OT} W 63–62; W 57–50; L 55–72

=== CCA/NCIT results ===
The Mustangs appeared in one of the two National Commissioners Invitational Tournaments, in 1974, and went 0–1.

Year	Round	Opponent	Result
1974	Quarterfinals	USC	L 80–82

== Notable players ==
=== Summary ===
Name	Class year	Notability	Reference(s)
Jim Krebs	1957	Former NBA player (1st round, 3rd overall), led SMU to Final Four	
Rick Herrscher	1958	1958 SWC Player of the Year	
Gene Phillips	1971	3 time SWC Player of the Year; Former NBA player	
Ira Terrell	1976	Former NBA player (45th overall) & 1976 SWC POY	
Jon Koncak	1985	Former NBA player (1st Round, 5th overall)	
Mike Wilson	1993	1993 SWC Player of the Year	
Jeryl Sasser	2001	Former NBA player (1st Round, 22nd overall), 1998-99 WAC Player of the Year	
Quinton Ross	2003	Former NBA player; 2002-03 WAC Player of the Year	
Nic Moore	2016	2015 & 2016 AAC Player of the Year; French A League Player for Nanterre 92	
Sterling Brown	2017	NBA Player (2nd Round, 46th overall); Winningest player in SMU History	
Semi Ojeleye	2017	2017 AAC Player of the Year; 2017 AP All-American Honorable Mention; NBA Player (2nd Round, 37th overall)	

=== Mustangs and the NBA ===
==== NBA draft picks ====
Year	Round	Pick	Player	Selected by	NBA games played
1949	–	63	Bob Prewitt	New York Knicks	0
1951	7	68	Jack Brown	Rochester Royals	0
1957	1	3	Jim Krebs	Minneapolis Lakers	515
1957	10	98	Bobby Mills	St. Louis Hawks	0
1958	6	47	Rick Herrscher	St. Louis Hawks	0
1961	9	83	Steve Strange	Chicago Packers	0
1962	4	35	Jan Loudermilk	Los Angeles Lakers	0
1964	4	34	Gene Elmore	San Francisco Warriors	0
1966	6	52	Carroll Hooser	Detroit Pistons	56
1967	7	74	Charlie Beasley	Cincinnati Royals	281
1969	16	196	Bill Voight	Milwaukee Bucks	0
1969	17	202	Lynn Phillips	Milwaukee Bucks	0
1971	7	119	Gene Phillips	Milwaukee Bucks	31
1974	6	97	Sammy Hervey	Atlanta Hawks	0
1976	3	45	Ira Terrell	Phoenix Suns	127
1980	2	45	Brad Branson	Detroit Pistons	72
1985	1	5	Jon Koncak	Atlanta Hawks	784
1985	5	113	Carl Wright	Philadelphia 76ers	0
1986	6	125	Kevin Lewis	San Antonio Spurs	0
1987	5	105	Terry Williams	Golden State Warriors	0
2001	1	22	Jeryl Sasser	Orlando Magic	82
2017	2	37	Semi Ojeleye	Boston Celtics	53
2017	2	46	Sterling Brown^	Philadelphia 76ers	34
2018	2	54	Shake Milton^	Dallas Mavericks	20
2026	2	58	Jaron Pierre Jr.^	New Orleans Pelicans	0

==== Notable undrafted players ====
Draft year	Player	NBA games played
1948	Roy Pugh	23
1967	Denny Holman	46
1988	Carlton McKinney	9
2003	Quinton Ross	458
2017	Ben Moore	2
2021	Feron Hunt	2

== Mustangs in international leagues ==
- Jalen Jones (born 1993), player for Hapoel Haifa in the Israeli Basketball Premier League
- Isiaha Mike (born 1997), player for Bahçeşehir Koleji of the Turkish Basketbol Süper Ligi (BSL) and the EuroCup
- Shake Milton (born 1996), player for Hapoel Jerusalem in the Israeli Basketball Premier League
- Ike Ofoegbu (born 1984), American-Nigerian Israeli Premier Basketball League player

== Awards ==
AAC Player of the Year

Player	Year(s)
Nic Moore	2015, 2016
Semi Ojeleye	2017
Kendric Davis	2022

AAC Tournament MVP

Player	Year(s)
Markus Kennedy	2015
Semi Ojeleye	2017

AAC Sixth Man of the Year

Player	Year(s)
Markus Kennedy	2016
Ben Emelogu	2017

WAC Player of the Year

Player	Year(s)
Jeryl Sasser	1999
Quinton Ross	2003

SWC Player of the Year

Player	Year(s)
Rick Herrscher	1958
Denny Holman	1967
Gene Phillips	1970
Ira Terrell	1976
Mike Wilson	1993

== All-Americans ==
SMU has had 12 All-Americans:

2016-2017 Semi Ojeleye (Jr.)(AP All-American Honorable Mention); 2015–16 Nic Moore (Sr.) (AP All-American Honorable Mention); 2014–15 Nic Moore (Jr.) (AP All-American Honorable Mention); 2002–03 Quinton Ross (Sr.); 1984–85 Jon Koncak (Sr.) (2nd team – Consensus); 1975–76 Ira Terrell (Sr.); 1970–71 Gene Phillips (Sr.); 1969–70 Gene Phillips (Jr.); 1959–60 Max Williams (Sr.); 1956–57 Jim Krebs (Sr.) (1st team – Consensus); 1955–56 Jim Krebs (Jr.); 1934–35 Whitey Baccus (Sr.)
