= 1956 NCAA basketball tournament =

Edition of USA college basketball tournament

- Season: 1955–56
- Teams: 25
- Finals site: McGaw Hall, Evanston, Illinois
- Champions: San Francisco Dons (2nd title, 2nd title game, 2nd Final Four)
- Runner-up: Iowa Hawkeyes (1st title game, 2nd Final Four)
- Semifinalists: SMU Mustangs (1st Final Four); Temple Owls (1st Final Four)
- Winning coach: Phil Woolpert (2nd title)
- MOP: Hal Lear (Temple)
- Attendance: 132,513
- Top scorer: Hal Lear (Temple) (160 points)

The 1956 NCAA basketball tournament involved 25 schools playing in single-elimination play to determine the national champion of men's NCAA college basketball. The 18th annual edition of the tournament began on March 12, 1956, and ended with the championship game on March 24, at McGaw Hall, located on Northwestern University's campus in Evanston, Illinois. A total of 29 games were played, including a third-place game in each region and a national third-place game.

The 1955–56 season was the last in which only one NCAA Tournament was held. Effective in 1956–57, the NCAA divided its membership into two competitive levels. The larger and more competitive athletic programs were placed in the University Division, and smaller programs in the College Division. Accordingly, that season would see separate tournaments contested in the University and College Divisions. In 1973, the University Division would be renamed NCAA Division I, while the College Division would be split into today's Divisions II and III.

This was the first NCAA tournament in which the four regionals were given distinct names, although the concept of four regional winners advancing to a single site for the "Final Four" had been introduced in 1952.

San Francisco, coached by Phil Woolpert, won the national title with an 83–71 victory in the final game over Iowa, coached by Bucky O'Connor. Hal Lear of Temple was named the tournament's Most Outstanding Player.

== Locations ==
Round	Region	Site	Venue
First Round	East	New York, New York	Madison Square Garden
First Round	Far West	Seattle, Washington	Hec Edmundson Pavilion
First Round	Midwest	Fort Wayne, Indiana	Allen County War Memorial Coliseum
First Round	West	Wichita, Kansas	U. of Wichita Field House
Regionals	East	Philadelphia, Pennsylvania	The Palestra
Regionals	Far West	Corvallis, Oregon	Oregon State Coliseum
Regionals	Midwest	Iowa City, Iowa	Iowa Field House
Regionals	West	Lawrence, Kansas	Allen Fieldhouse
Final Four		Evanston, Illinois	McGaw Memorial Hall

== Teams ==
Region	Team	Coach	Conference	Finished	Final Opponent	Score
East
East	Canisius	Joseph Curran	WNY3	Regional Runner-up	Temple	L 60–58
East	Connecticut	Hugh Greer	Yankee	Regional Fourth Place	Dartmouth	L 85–64
East	Dartmouth	Doggie Julian	Ivy League	Regional third place	Connecticut	W 85–64
East	Holy Cross	Roy Leenig	Independent	First round	Temple	L 74–72
East	Manhattan	Ken Norton	Metro NY	First round	Connecticut	L 84–75
East	NC State	Everett Case	Atlantic Coast	First round	Canisius	L 79–78
East	Temple	Harry Litwack	Independent	Third Place	SMU	W 90–81
East	West Virginia	Fred Schaus	Southern	First round	Dartmouth	L 61–59
Far West
Far West	Idaho State	Steve Belko	Independent	First round	Seattle	L 68–66
Far West	San Francisco	Phil Woolpert	CBA	Champion	Iowa	W 83–71
Far West	Seattle	Al Brightman	Independent	Regional Fourth Place	UCLA	L 94–70
Far West	UCLA	John Wooden	Pacific Coast	Regional third place	Seattle	W 94–70
Far West	Utah	Jack Gardner	Mountain States	Regional Runner-up	San Francisco	L 92–77
Midwest
Midwest	DePaul	Ray Meyer	Independent	First round	Wayne State (MI)	L 72–63
Midwest	Iowa	Bucky O'Connor	Big Ten	Runner Up	San Francisco	L 83–71
Midwest	Kentucky	Adolph Rupp	Southeastern	Regional Runner-up	Iowa	L 89–77
Midwest	Marshall	Jule Rivlin	Mid-American	First round	Morehead State	L 107–92
Midwest	Morehead State	Bobby Laughlin	Ohio Valley	Regional third place	Wayne State (MI)	W 95–84
Midwest	Wayne State (MI)	Joel Mason	Independent	Regional Fourth Place	Morehead State	L 95–84
West
West	Houston	Alden Pasche	Missouri Valley	Regional Fourth Place	Kansas State	L 89–70
West	Kansas State	Tex Winter	Big 7	Regional third place	Houston	W 89–70
West	Memphis State	Eugene Lambert	Independent	First round	Oklahoma City	L 97–81
West	Oklahoma City	Abe Lemons	Independent	Regional Runner-up	SMU	L 84–63
West	SMU	Doc Hayes	Southwest	Fourth Place	Temple	L 90–81
West	Texas Tech	Polk Robison	Border	First round	SMU	L 68–67

== Bracket ==
* – Denotes overtime period

=== East Region ===
Quarterfinals
Connecticut	84
Manhattan	75
Temple	74
Holy Cross	72
Dartmouth	61
West Virginia	59*
Canisius	79
NC State	78****

Semifinals
Connecticut	59
Temple	65
Dartmouth	58
Canisius	66

Finals
Temple	60
Canisius	58
Third place
Dartmouth	85
Connecticut	64

=== Midwest Region ===
First round
Morehead State	107
Marshall	92
Wayne State (MI)	72
DePaul	63

Semifinals
Iowa	97
Morehead State	83
Kentucky	84
Wayne State	64

Final
Iowa	89
Kentucky	77
Third place
Morehead State	95
Wayne State	84

=== West Region ===
First round
SMU	68
Texas Tech	67
Oklahoma City	97
Memphis State	81

Semifinals
Houston	74
SMU	89
Kansas State	93
Oklahoma City	97

Final
SMU	84
Oklahoma City	63
Third place
Kansas State	89
Houston	70

=== Far West Region ===
Quarterfinals
Seattle	68
Idaho State	66

Semifinals
Utah	81
Seattle	72
San Francisco	72
UCLA	61

Finals
Utah	77
San Francisco	92
Third place
UCLA	94
Seattle	70

=== Final Four ===
National Semifinals
E	Temple	76
MW	Iowa	83
W	SMU	68
FW	San Francisco	86

National Championship Game
MW	Iowa	71
FW	San Francisco	83
National third-place game
Temple	90
SMU	81

== See also ==
- 1956 National Invitation Tournament
- 1956 NAIA Basketball Tournament

== Notes ==
- Canisius's first-round victory over the second-ranked North Carolina State Wolfpack, considered by many to be among the top ten upsets in tournament history, set a record for most overtime periods in a Division I men's tournament game with four, a record that still stands as of 2023 (tied once, in 1961).
- Northwestern University previously hosted the first ever NCAA Men's Basketball Championship game on March 27, 1939, in the first Patten Gym.
- Alabama (21–3, 14–0) had won the Southeastern Conference and had their all-time highest ranking (#4) at the end of the 1956 season, but due to a rule that players could not play as freshman, as their entire starting lineup had previously done, they were ruled ineligible for the 1956 NCAA Tournament.
- There were six new participants in the 1956 tournament: Houston, Manhattan, Marshall, Michigan State, Morehead State and Wayne University (which became Wayne State University later that year). This was the only tournament for the Tartars (now Warriors), as they would drop to the College Division and eventually Division II. They are one of five teams to win a game in the tournament and drop from what is now Division I afterwards.
