= 1955–56 Idaho Vandals men's basketball team =

American college basketball season

1955–56 Idaho Vandals men's basketball
- Conference: Pacific Coast Conference
- Record: 10–16 (4–12 PCC)
- Head coach: Harlan Hodges (2nd season)
- Assistant coach: Clem Parberry
- Home arena: Memorial Gymnasium

1955–56 Pacific Coast Conference men's basketball standings
	Conf.				Overall
Team	W		L	PCT	W		L	PCT
No. 8 UCLA	16	–	0	1.000	22	–	6	.786
Washington	11	–	5	.688	15	–	11	.577
Stanford	10	–	6	.625	18	–	6	.750
California	10	–	6	.625	17	–	8	.680
USC	9	–	7	.563	14	–	12	.538
Oregon	5	–	11	.313	11	–	15	.423
Oregon State	5	–	11	.313	8	–	18	.308
Idaho	4	–	12	.250	6	–	19	.240
Washington State	2	–	14	.125	4	–	22	.154
Rankings from AP Poll

The 1955–56 Idaho Vandals men's basketball team represented the University of Idaho during the 1955–56 NCAA college basketball season. Members of the Pacific Coast Conference, the Vandals were led by second-year head coach Harlan Hodges and played their home games on campus at Memorial Gymnasium in Moscow, Idaho.

The Vandals were 6–19 overall and 4–12 in conference play.
