= Jule Rivlin =

American basketball player and coach (1917–2002)

Personal information
- Born: February 2, 1917 Pittsburgh, Pennsylvania, U.S.
- Died: September 23, 2002 (aged 85) Los Angeles, California, U.S.
- Listed height: 5 ft 11 in (1.80 m)

Career information
- High school: Tridelphia (Wheeling, West Virginia)
- College: Marshall (1937–1940)
- Playing career: 1940–1948
- Position: Guard

Career history

Playing
- 1939–1941: Akron Goodyear Wingfoots
- 1945–1946: Toledo Whites
- 1946–1948: Toledo Jeeps
- 1948–1952: Wheeling

Coaching
- 1946–1948: Toledo Jeeps
- 1955–1963: Marshall

Career highlights
- WPBT MVP (1947); AAU All-American (1944)

Julius Leon Rivlin (February 2, 1917 – September 23, 2002) was a college men's basketball coach and professional basketball player. He was the head coach of Marshall from 1955 to 1963. He coached Marshall to a 100–88 record, winning one Mid-American Conference championship and making one NCAA tournament appearance.

Rivlin played college basketball at Marshall before playing three seasons in the National Basketball League for the Akron Goodyear Wingfoots and the Toledo Jeeps, with a break for service in World War II at Fort Warren, Wyoming.

Prior to the war, Jules played semi-pro basketball for the Clarksburg (West Virginia) Pure Oilers where he was a close friend and teammate of Press Maravich (father of "Pistol" Pete Maravich).

Rivlin also served as the Jeeps' coach. In 1947, he was named the World Professional Basketball Tournament's MVP. In 1974, Julie coached Maccabi Union's basketball team to the Europe Maccabiah Games Championships. Rivlin was named second team All-Century Marshall University Basketball Team, and is a member of the West Virginia Sports Hall of Fame.

== Head coaching record ==
Record table
Season	Team	Overall	Conference	Standing	Postseason
Marshall Thundering Herd (Mid-American Conference) (1955–1963)
1955–56	Marshall	18–5	10–2	1st	NCAA First Round
1956–57	Marshall	15–9	8–4	2nd	
1957–58	Marshall	17–7	9–3	2nd	
1958–59	Marshall	12–12	6–6	T–3rd	
1959–60	Marshall	10–13	4–8	6th	
1960–61	Marshall	11–13	5–7	4th	
1961–62	Marshall	10–13	6–6	4th	
1962–63	Marshall	7–16	1–11	T-6th	
Marshall:		100–88 (.532)	49–47 (.510)		
Total:		100–88 (.532)			
National champion Postseason invitational champion Conference regular season champion Conference regular season and conference tournament champion Division regular season champion Division regular season and conference tournament champion Conference tournament champion
