= 1955–56 Washington State Cougars men's basketball team =

American college basketball season

1955–56 Washington State Cougars men's basketball
- Conference: Pacific Coast Conference
- Record: 4–22 (2–14 PCC)
- Head coach: Jack Friel (28th season)
- Home arena: Bohler Gymnasium

1955–56 Pacific Coast Conference men's basketball standings
	Conf.				Overall
Team	W		L	PCT	W		L	PCT
No. 8 UCLA	16	–	0	1.000	22	–	6	.786
Washington	11	–	5	.688	15	–	11	.577
Stanford	10	–	6	.625	18	–	6	.750
California	10	–	6	.625	17	–	8	.680
USC	9	–	7	.563	14	–	12	.538
Oregon	5	–	11	.313	11	–	15	.423
Oregon State	5	–	11	.313	8	–	18	.308
Idaho	4	–	12	.250	6	–	19	.240
Washington State	2	–	14	.125	4	–	22	.154
Rankings from AP Poll

The 1955–56 Washington State Cougars men's basketball team represented Washington State College for the 1955–56 NCAA college basketball season. Led by 28th-year head coach Jack Friel, the Cougars were members of the Pacific Coast Conference and played their home games on campus at Bohler Gymnasium in Pullman, Washington.

The Cougars were 4–22 overall in the regular season and 2–14 in conference play, last in the standings.
