= 1955–56 Georgia Bulldogs basketball team =

American college basketball season

1955–56 Georgia Bulldogs basketball
- Conference: Southeastern Conference
- Record: 3–21 (1–13 SEC)
- Head coach: Harbin Lawson (5th season)
- Captain: Horace Knight
- Home arena: Woodruff Hall

1955–56 Southeastern Conference men's basketball standings
	Conf.				Overall
Team	W		L	PCT	W		L	PCT
No. 5 Alabama	14	–	0	1.000	21	–	3	.875
No. 9 Kentucky	12	–	2	.857	20	–	6	.769
No. 12 Vanderbilt	11	–	3	.786	19	–	4	.826
Auburn	8	–	6	.571	11	–	10	.524
Tulane	7	–	7	.500	12	–	12	.500
Georgia Tech	6	–	8	.429	12	–	11	.522
Mississippi State	6	–	8	.429	12	–	12	.500
Tennessee	6	–	8	.429	10	–	14	.417
LSU	5	–	9	.357	7	–	17	.292
Florida	4	–	10	.286	11	–	12	.478
Ole Miss	4	–	10	.286	10	–	13	.435
Georgia	1	–	13	.071	3	–	21	.125
Rankings from AP Poll

The 1955–56 Georgia Bulldogs basketball team represented the University of Georgia as a member of the Southeastern Conference (SEC) during the 1955–56 NCAA men's basketball season. Led by fifth-year head coach Harbin Lawson, the Bulldogs compiled an overall record of 3–21 with a mark of 1–13 conference play, placing last out of 12 teams in the SEC. The team captain was Horace Knight.

== Roster ==
1955–56 Georgia Bulldogs men's basketball team
Players
Coaches

Pos.	#	Name	Height	Weight	Year	Previous school	Hometown
G		Morris Dinwiddie	5 ft 10 in (1.78 m)	—	Sr
F		Bill Ensley	6 ft 5 in (1.96 m)	—	Jr
C		Henry Cabaniss	6 ft 5 in (1.96 m)	—	So
F		Curtis Gleaton	6 ft 4 in (1.93 m)	—
G		Ray Allen	6 ft 1 in (1.85 m)	—	So
G		Don Hartsfield	6 ft 0 in (1.83 m)	—	So
F		George Bell	6 ft 3 in (1.91 m)	—	Sr
		Bill Hearn	6 ft 3 in (1.91 m)	—
F		Horace Knight	6 ft 2 in (1.88 m)	—
F		Ronald Bradley	6 ft 0 in (1.83 m)	—	Sr
F		Terry Hagan	6 ft 3 in (1.91 m)	—

Head coach

Harbin Lawson

Assistant coach(es)

Legend

- (C) Team captain
- (S) Suspended
- (I) Ineligible
- (W) Walk-on
- Injured
- Current redshirt

== Schedule ==
Date time, TV	Opponent	Result	Record	Site city, state
12/1/1955	at Tennessee	L 67-86	0–1	
12/7/1955	at Mercer	W 75-72	1–1	
12/17/1955	at Georgia Tech	L 62-75	1–2	
12/19/1955	at Vanderbilt	L 61-85	1–3	
12/28/1955	South Carolina	L 68-85	1–4	Athens, GA
12/29/1955	LSU	L 86-91	1–5	Athens, GA
1/5/1956	at Tulane	L 77-96	1–6	
1/7/1956	at LSU	L 56-72	1–7	
1/11/1956	Tennessee	L 59-62	1–8	Athens, GA
1/13/1956	Florida State	L 76-79	1–9	Athens, GA
1/21/1956	Auburn	L 59-60	1–10	Athens, GA
1/28/1956	Alabama	L 75-99	1–11	Athens, GA
1/30/1956	Florida	W 93-73	2–11	Athens, GA
2/4/1956	Vanderbilt	L 56-69	2–12	Athens, GA
2/8/1956	at Mercer	W 91-79	3–12	
2/11/1956	at Alabama	L 69-94	3–13	
2/13/1956	Georgia Tech	L 68-72	3–14	Athens, GA
2/16/1956	at Auburn	L 80-96	3–15	
2/18/1956	at Mississippi	L 65-105	3–16	
2/20/1956	at Miss. State	L 71-83	3–17	
2/25/1956	Georgia Tech	L 72-81	3–18	Athens, GA
2/27/1956	Kentucky	L 66-143	3–19	Athens, GA
3/3/1956	at Florida	L 69-82	3–20	
3/5/1956	at Florida State	L 75-80	3–21	
*Non-conference game. (#) Tournament seedings in parentheses.
