= 1955–56 UCLA Bruins men's basketball team =

American college basketball season

1955–56 UCLA Bruins men's basketball

PCC Champions

NCAA tournament, W Regional consolation Game
- Conference: Pacific Coast Conference

Ranking
- Coaches: No. 9
- AP: No. 8
- Record: 22–6 (16–0 PCC)
- Head coach: John R. Wooden (8th season)
- Assistant coaches: Bill Putnam; Deane Richardson
- Home arena: Men's Gym

1955–56 Pacific Coast Conference men's basketball standings
	Conf.				Overall
Team	W		L	PCT	W		L	PCT
No. 8 UCLA	16	–	0	1.000	22	–	6	.786
Washington	11	–	5	.688	15	–	11	.577
Stanford	10	–	6	.625	18	–	6	.750
California	10	–	6	.625	17	–	8	.680
USC	9	–	7	.563	14	–	12	.538
Oregon	5	–	11	.313	11	–	15	.423
Oregon State	5	–	11	.313	8	–	18	.308
Idaho	4	–	12	.250	6	–	19	.240
Washington State	2	–	14	.125	4	–	22	.154
Rankings from AP Poll

The 1955–56 UCLA Bruins men's basketball team represented the University of California, Los Angeles during the 1955–56 NCAA men's basketball season and were members of the Pacific Coast Conference. The Bruins were led by eight year head coach John Wooden. They finished the regular season with a record of 22–6 and won the PCC regular season championship with a record of 16–0. UCLA lost to the San Francisco Dons in the NCAA regional semifinals and defeated the Seattle Chieftains in the regional consolation game. The victory over Seattle was UCLA's first victory in the NCAA tournament.

== Previous season ==
The Bruins finished the regular season with a record of 21–5 and won the PCC Southern Division with a record of 11–1. UCLA lost to Oregon State in the PCC conference play-offs.

== Roster ==
1955–56 UCLA Bruins men's basketball team
Players
Coaches

Pos.	#	Name	Height	Weight	Year	Hometown
G	55	Carroll Adams	6 ft 1 in (1.85 m)	—	Sr
F	43	Jack Arnold	6 ft 3 in (1.91 m)	—
F		Allen Bailey	6 ft 5 in (1.96 m)	—
G	42	Dick Banton	6 ft 1 in (1.85 m)	—	Jr
F	35	Conrad Burke	6 ft 5 in (1.96 m)	—	So
F	54	Bill Eblen	6 ft 3 in (1.91 m)	—
F	44	Jim Halsten	6 ft 4 in (1.93 m)	—	So
F	44	Jim Harrison	6 ft 0 in (1.83 m)	—	So
F	53	Allen Herring	6 ft 3 in (1.91 m)	—	Sr
G		Art Hutchins	5 ft 11 in (1.8 m)	—
C	33	Nolan Johnson	6 ft 6 in (1.98 m)	—
C	33	Willie Naulls (C)	6 ft 5 in (1.96 m)	—	Sr	Dallas, Texas
F	32	Ben Rogers	6 ft 6 in (1.98 m)	—	So
G	22	Morris Taft	6 ft 3 in (1.91 m)	—	Sr
G	22	Walt Torrence	6 ft 2 in (1.88 m)	—	Fr
G		Ron Winterburn	6 ft 2 in (1.88 m)	—

Head coach

John Wooden (Purdue)

Assistant coach(es)

- Bill Putnam (UCLA)
- Deane Richardson

Legend

- (C) Team captain
- (S) Suspended
- (I) Ineligible
- (W) Walk-on
- Injured
- Current redshirt

Roster
Last update: 30 January 2018

== Schedule ==
Date time, TV	Rank^{#}	Opponent^{#}	Result	Record	Site city, state
Regular Season
December 2, 1955*		at BYU	L 58–75	0–1	Smith Fieldhouse; Provo, UT
December 3, 1955*		at BYU	L 65–67	0–2	Smith Fieldhouse; Provo, UT
December 9, 1955*	No. 16	vs. Denver	W 68–40	1–2	Long Beach City College; Long Beach Arena
December 10, 1955*	No. 16	vs. Purdue	W 76–60	2–2	Long Beach City College; Long Beach, CA
December 16, 1955*		at Nebraska	L 65–71	2–3	Nebraska Coliseum; Lincoln, NE
December 17, 1955*		at Wichita State	L 68–76	2–4	University of Wichita Field House; Wichita, KS
December 26, 1955*		at St. John's; ECAC Holiday Festival	W 93–86	3–4	Madison Square Garden; New York, NY
December 28, 1955*		vs. Duquesne; ECAC Holiday Festival	W 72–57	4–4	Madison Square Garden; New York, NY
December 30, 1955*		vs. No. 1 San Francisco; ECAC Holiday Festival	L 53–70	4–5	Madison Square Garden; New York, NY
January 6, 1956		Idaho	W 92–73	5–5 (1–0)	Pan-Pacific Auditorium; Los Angeles, CA
January 7, 1956		Idaho	W 78–61	6–5 (2–0)	Pan-Pacific Auditorium; Los Angeles, CA
January 13, 1956		at Washington State	W 86–72	7–5 (3–0)	Beasley Coliseum; Pullman, WA
January 14, 1956		at Washington State	W 95–70	8–5 (4–0)	Beasley Coliseum; Pullman, WA
January 28, 1956*		at Arizona State	W 99–79	9–5	Sun Devil Gym; Tempe, AZ
February 3, 1956	No. 20	Washington	W 61–60	10–5 (5–0)	Pan-Pacific Auditorium; Los Angeles, CA
February 4, 1956	No. 20	Washington	W 82–75	11–5 (6–0)	Pan-Pacific Auditorium; Los Angeles, CA
February 10, 1956	No. 18	at Stanford	W 50–48	12–5 (7–0)	Stanford Pavilion; Stanford, CA
February 11, 1956	No. 18	at Stanford	W 81–72	13–5 (8–0)	Stanford Pavilion; Stanford, CA
February 17, 1956	No. 20	at Oregon State	W 77–56	14–5 (9–0)	Oregon State Coliseum; Corvallis, OR
February 18, 1956	No. 20	at Oregon State	W 72–59	15–5 (10–0)	Oregon State Coliseum; Corvallis, OR
February 24, 1956	No. 15	Oregon	W 95–71	16–5 (11–0)	Venice High School Gym; Los Angeles, CA
February 25, 1956	No. 15	Oregon	W 108–89	17–5 (12–0)	Venice High School Gym; Los Angeles, CA
March 2, 1956	No. 13	California	W 85–80	18–5 (13–0)	Venice High School Gym; Los Angeles, CA
March 3, 1956	No. 13	California	W 84–62	19–5 (14–0)	Venice High School Gym; Los Angeles, CA
March 9, 1956	No. 10	at USC	W 85–70	20–5 (15–0)	Pan-Pacific Auditorium; Los Angeles, CA
March 10, 1956	No. 10	at USC	W 97–84	21–5 (16–0)	Pan-Pacific Auditorium; Los Angeles, CA
NCAA tournament
March 16, 1956*	No. 10	vs. No. 1 San Francisco; Regional semifinals	L 61–72	21–6	Oregon State Coliseum; Corvallis, OR
March 17, 1956*	No. 10	vs. Seattle; Regional consolation game	W 94–70	22–6	Oregon State Coliseum; Corvallis, OR
*Non-conference game. ^{#}Rankings from AP Poll. (#) Tournament seedings in parentheses. All times are in Pacific Time.
