= 1955–56 San Francisco Dons men's basketball team =

American college basketball season

1955–56 San Francisco Dons men's basketball
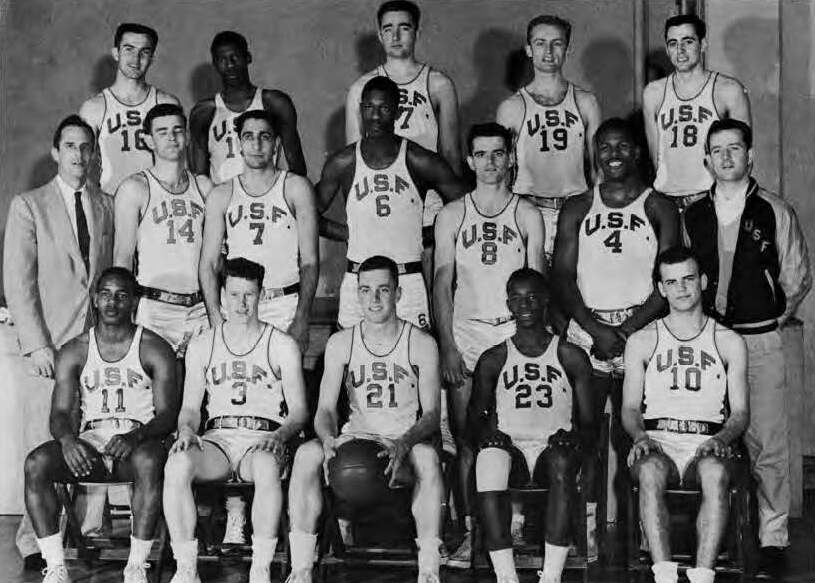

NCAA tournament National champions NCAA regular season champions CBA regular season champions

National Championship Game, W 83–71 vs. Iowa
- Conference: California Basketball Association

Ranking
- Coaches: No. 1
- AP: No. 1
- Record: 29–0 (14–0 CBA)
- Head coach: Phil Woolpert (6th season)
- Assistant coach: Ross Giudice
- Home arena: Kezar Pavilion

1955–56 California Basketball Association men's basketball standings
	Conf.				Overall
Team	W		L	PCT	W		L	PCT
No. 1 San Francisco	14	–	0	1.000	29	–	0	1.000
Pacific	9	–	5	.643	15	–	11	.577
Loyola (Calif.)	9	–	5	.643	13	–	12	.520
Saint Mary's	8	–	6	.571	16	–	10	.615
San Jose State	8	–	6	.571	15	–	10	.600
Santa Clara	6	–	8	.429	8	–	16	.333
Fresno State	2	–	12	.143	9	–	17	.346
Pepperdine	0	–	14	.000	2	–	23	.080
Rankings from AP Poll

The 1955–56 San Francisco Dons men's basketball team represented the University of San Francisco as a member of the California Basketball Association during the 1955–56 NCAA men's basketball season. The Dons ended the season undefeated, becoming the first NCAA tournament champion to record a perfect season and the first team to go wire-to-wire as No. 1 in the AP and UP polls. San Francisco finished the season with a 29–0 record (14–0 CBA) and had won 55 consecutive games.

== Season summary ==
San Francisco won two straight NCAA titles behind a punishing defense led by Bill Russell, who turned shot blocking into an art form. He was also a much better scorer than history gives him credit for, averaging more than 20 points in both championship seasons. In 1956, Russell had support from guard K.C. Jones and a balanced lineup; besides Russell, five other players averaged between 7.1 and 9.8 points per game.

== Roster ==
1955–56 San Francisco Dons men's basketball team
Players
Coaches

Pos.	#	Name	Height	Weight	Year	Hometown
	3	Hal Payne	—	—
G	4	K. C. Jones	6 ft 1 in (1.85 m)	195 lb (88 kg)	Sr	San Francisco, California
C	6	Bill Russell	6 ft 9 in (2.06 m)	210 lb (95 kg)	Sr	Oakland, California
	7	John Koljian	—	—
	8	Bill Bush	—	—
	10	Steve Balchios	—	—
	11	Warren Baxter	—	—
	12	Bill Mallen	—	—
	14	Vince Boyle	—	—
G	15	Gene Brown	6 ft 3 in (1.91 m)	—	So	San Francisco, California
	16	Tom Nelson	—	—
F	17	Mike Farmer	6 ft 7 in (2.01 m)	200 lb (91 kg)	So	Richmond, California
F	18	Mike Preaseau	6 ft 5 in (1.96 m)	180 lb (82 kg)	So	Redding, California
F	19	Carl Boldt	6 ft 4 in (1.93 m)	—	Jr	Tujunga, California
	21	Jack King	—	—
G	23	Hal Perry	5 ft 10 in (1.78 m)	—	Sr	Ukiah, California

Head coach

- Phil Woolpert (Loyola Marymount)

Assistant coach(es)

- Ross Giudice (San Francisco)

Legend

- (C) Team captain
- (S) Suspended
- (I) Ineligible
- (W) Walk-on
- Injured
- Current redshirt

== Schedule and results ==
Date time, TV	Rank^{#}	Opponent^{#}	Result	Record	High points	High rebounds	High assists	Site city, state
Regular Season
Dec 2, 1955*	No. 1	Cal State-Chico	W 70–39	1–0	–	–	–	Kezar Pavilion; San Francisco, California
Dec 3, 1955*	No. 1	Southern California	W 58–42	2–0	–	–	–	Kezar Pavilion; San Francisco, California
Dec 6, 1955*	No. 1	San Francisco State	W 72–47	3–0	–	–	–	Kezar Pavilion; San Francisco, California
Dec 16, 1955*	No. 1	vs. Marquette; DePaul Tournament	W 65–58	4–0	–	–	–	University Auditorium; Chicago, Illinois
Dec 17, 1955*	No. 1	at DePaul; DePaul Tournament	W 82–59	5–0	–	–	–	University Auditorium; Chicago, Illinois
Dec 20, 1955*	No. 1	at Wichita State	W 75–65	6–0	–	–	–	University of Wichita Field House; Wichita, Kansas
Dec 23, 1955*	No. 1	at Loyola (LA)	W 61–43	7–0	–	–	–	Loyola Field House; New Orleans, Louisiana
Dec 26, 1955*	No. 1	vs. La Salle; ECAC Holiday Festival	W 79–62	8–0	–	–	–	Madison Square Garden; New York, New York
Dec 28, 1955*	No. 1	vs. No. 14 Holy Cross; ECAC Holiday Festival	W 67–51	9–0	–	–	–	Madison Square Garden; New York, New York
Dec 30, 1955*	No. 1	vs. UCLA; ECAC Holiday Festival	W 70–53	10–0	–	–	–	Madison Square Garden; New York, New York
Jan 6, 1956	No. 1	Pepperdine	W 62–51	11–0 (1–0)	–	–	–	Kezar Pavilion; San Francisco, California
Jan 10, 1956	No. 1	Santa Clara	W 74–56	12–0 (2–0)	–	–	–	Kezar Pavilion; San Francisco, California
Jan 13, 1956	No. 1	at Fresno State	W 69–50	13–0 (3–0)	–	–	–	College Gym; Fresno, California
Jan 28, 1956*	No. 1	at California	W 33–24	14–0	–	–	–	Cow Palace; Daly City, California
Jan 31, 1956	No. 1	San Jose State	W 67–40	15–0 (4–0)	–	–	–	Cow Palace; Daly City, California
Feb 3, 1956	No. 1	Loyola (Los Angeles)	W 68–46	16–0 (5–0)	–	–	–	Kezar Pavilion; San Francisco, California
Feb 7, 1956	No. 1	at Pacific	W 77–60	17–0 (6–0)	–	–	–	Pacific Pavilion; Stockton, California
Feb 10, 1956	No. 1	Fresno State	W 79–46	18–0 (7–0)	–	–	–	Kezar Pavilion; San Francisco, California
Feb 14, 1956	No. 1	at San Jose State	W 76–52	19–0 (8–0)	–	–	–	Spartan Gym; San Jose, California
Feb 17, 1956	No. 1	at Saint Mary's	W 74–63	20–0 (9–0)	28 – Russell	–	–	Madigan Gymnasium; Moraga, California
Feb 24, 1956	No. 1	at Santa Clara	W 80–44	21–0 (10–0)	29 – Russell	–	–	San Jose Civic Auditorium; San Jose, California
Feb 28, 1956	No. 1	Pacific	W 87–49	22–0 (11–0)	28 – Russell	–	–	Kezar Pavilion; San Francisco, California
Mar 2, 1956	No. 1	at Pepperdine	W 68–40	23–0 (12–0)	–	–	–	LBCC Main Gym; Long Beach, California
Mar 3, 1956	No. 1	at Loyola (Los Angeles)	W 65–48	24–0 (13–0)	–	–	–	LBCC Main Gym; Long Beach, California
Mar 6, 1956	No. 1	Saint Mary's	W 82–49	25–0 (14–0)	–	–	–	Cow Palace; Daly City, California
NCAA Tournament
Mar 16, 1956*	No. 1	vs. No. 8 UCLA; Far West Regional semifinal	W 72–61	26–0	23 – Brown	23 – Russell	–	Oregon State Coliseum; Corvallis, Oregon
Mar 17, 1956*	No. 1	vs. No. 18 Utah; Far West Regional Final	W 92–77	27–0	27 – Russell	22 – Russell	–	Oregon State Coliseum; Corvallis, Oregon
Mar 22, 1956*	No. 1	vs. No. 7 SMU; National semifinal – Final Four	W 86–68	28–0	26 – Farmer	23 – Russell	–	McGaw Hall; Evanston, Illinois
Mar 23, 1956*	No. 1	vs. No. 4 Iowa; National Championship Game	W 83–71	29–0	26 – Russell	27 – Russell	–	McGaw Hall; Evanston, Illinois
*Non-conference game. ^{#}Rankings from AP Poll. (#) Tournament seedings in parentheses. FW=Far West. All times are in Pacific Time.

== Rankings ==
Ranking movements
	Week															
Poll	Pre	1	2	3	4	5	6	7	8	9	10	11	12	13	14	Final
AP	Not released	1	1	1	1	1	1	1	1	1	1	1	1	1	1	1
Coaches	1	1	1	1	1	1	1	1	1	1	1	1	1	1	1	Not released

== Awards and honors ==
- Bill Russell – Consensus First Team All-America selection, Helms Foundation College Basketball Player of the Year (2x), UPI College Basketball Player of the Year, California Basketball Association Player of the Year
- K. C. Jones – Consensus Second Team All-America selection
- Phil Woolpert – UPI College Basketball Coach of the Year

== Team players drafted into the NBA ==
Round	Pick	Player	NBA club
1	2	Bill Russell	Boston Celtics
2	1	KC Jones	Boston Celtics
7	50	Carl Boldt	Detroit Pistons
