= 1955–56 Iowa State Cyclones men's basketball team =

American college basketball season

1955–56 Iowa State Cyclones men's basketball

Big Seven Holiday Tournament Champions
- Conference: Big Seven Conference
- Record: 18–5 (8–4 Big Seven)
- Head coach: Bill Strannigan (2nd season)
- Assistant coach: Bob Lamson
- Home arena: Iowa State Armory

1955–56 Big Seven Conference men's basketball standings
	Conf.				Overall
Team	W		L	PCT	W		L	PCT
Kansas State	9	–	3	.750	17	–	8	.680
Iowa State	8	–	4	.667	18	–	5	.783
Missouri	8	–	4	.667	15	–	7	.682
Colorado	7	–	5	.583	11	–	10	.524
Kansas	6	–	6	.500	14	–	9	.609
Nebraska	3	–	9	.250	7	–	16	.304
Oklahoma	1	–	11	.083	4	–	19	.174
Rankings from AP Poll

The 1955–56 Iowa State Cyclones men's basketball team represented Iowa State University during the 1955–56 NCAA men's basketball season. The Cyclones were coached by Bill Strannigan, who was in his second season with the Cyclones. They played their home games at the Iowa State Armory in Ames, Iowa.

They finished the season 18–5, 8–4 in Big Seven play to finish in a tie for second place. They won the Big Seven Holiday Tournament, defeating Kansas State, Colorado and Kansas.

== Roster ==
1955–56 Iowa State Cyclones men's basketball team
Players
Coaches

Pos.	#	Name	Height	Weight	Year	Hometown
F	25	Bud Bergman	6 ft 4 in (1.93 m)	—	Fr	Grundy Center, Iowa
F	40	John Crawford	6 ft 5 in (1.96 m)	—	So	New York City
C	31	Bill Dale	6 ft 5 in (1.96 m)	—	Sr	Lehigh, Iowa
G	23	Dick Farwell	6 ft 1 in (1.85 m)	—	So	Clinton, Iowa
G	33	Lyle Frahm	6 ft 2 in (1.88 m)	—	So	Manning, Iowa
G	22	Arnie Gaarde (C)	5 ft 10 in (1.78 m)	—	Sr	Armstrong, Iowa
G		Al Lowery	5 ft 10 in (1.78 m)	—	So	Homewood, Illinois
C	30	Don Medsker	6 ft 8 in (2.03 m)	—	So	Englewood, Colorado
	35	Bill Meyer	6 ft 4 in (1.93 m)	—		Davenport, Iowa
F	24	Jack Peterson	6 ft 2 in (1.88 m)	—		Des Moines, Iowa
G	32	Jerry Sandbulte (C)	6 ft 0 in (1.83 m)	—		Sioux Center, Iowa
G	21	Larry Swanson	6 ft 0 in (1.83 m)	—		Oshkosh, Wisconsin
G	20	Gary Thompson	5 ft 10 in (1.78 m)	—	Jr	Roland, Iowa
F	41	Chuck Vogt	6 ft 6 in (1.98 m)	—	Jr	Clinton, Iowa
		Dave Young	6 ft 2 in (1.88 m)	—		Ottumwa, Iowa

Head coach

- Bill Strannigan

Assistant coach(es)

Bob Lamson

Legend

- (C) Team captain
- (S) Suspended
- (I) Ineligible
- (W) Walk-on
- Injured
- Current redshirt

== Schedule and results ==
Date time, TV	Rank^{#}	Opponent^{#}	Result	Record	Site city, state
Regular season
December 3, 1955*; 7:35 pm		North Dakota State	W 86–60	1–0	Iowa State Armory; Ames, Iowa
December 8, 1955*; 7:35 pm		Texas Tech	W 72–52	2–0	Iowa State Armory; Ames, Iowa
December 10, 1955*; 7:35 pm		Tulsa	W 62–50	3–0	Iowa State Armory; Ames, Iowa
December 19, 1955*; 9:00 pm		at Colorado A&M (Colorado State)	W 72–60	4–0	South College Gymnasium; Fort Collins, Colorado
December 21, 1955*; 9:45 pm		at Denver	L 62–65	4–1	DU Fieldhouse; Denver, Colorado
December 23, 1955*; 8:45 pm		No. 8 Vanderbilt	W 87–76	5–1	Iowa State Armory; Ames, Iowa
December 27, 1955*; 9:30 pm		vs. Kansas State; Big Seven Holiday Tournament Quarterfinals	W 79–71	6–1	Municipal Auditorium; Kansas City, Missouri
December 29, 1955*; 7:30 pm		vs. Colorado; Big Seven Holiday Tournament Semifinals	W 55–52	7–1	Municipal Auditorium; Kansas City, Missouri
December 30, 1955*; 9:45 pm		vs. Kansas; Big Seven Holiday Tournament Championship	W 67–56	8–1	Municipal Auditorium; Kansas City, Missouri
January 7, 1956; 7:35 pm, WOI	No. 8	Kansas State	L 64–68	8–2 (0–1)	Iowa State Armory; Ames, Iowa
January 14, 1956; 7:30 pm	No. 15	at Oklahoma	W 58–55	9–2 (1–1)	OU Field House; Norman, Oklahoma
January 16, 1956; 7:35 pm		at Kansas	L 63–68	9–3 (1–2)	Allen Fieldhouse; Lawrence, Kansas
January 20, 1956*; 8:05 pm, WOI		Drake; Iowa Big Four	W 81–60	10–3	Iowa State Armory; Ames, Iowa
January 23, 1956; 7:35 pm, WOI		Colorado	W 70–68	11–3 (2–2)	Iowa State Armory; Ames, Iowa
January 28, 1956; 7:35 pm, WOI		Oklahoma	W 71–59	12–3 (3–2)	Iowa State Armory; Ames, Iowa
February 4, 1956; 7:35 pm, WOI		Kansas	W 79–63	13–3 (4–2)	Iowa State Armory; Ames, Iowa
February 7, 1956*; 8:15 pm		at Drake; Iowa Big Four	W 87–70	14–3	Drake Fieldhouse; Des Moines, Iowa
February 11, 1956; 8:00 pm		at Missouri	W 88–85 ^{OT}	15–3 (5–2)	Brewer Fieldhouse; Columbia, Missouri
February 18, 1956; 8:05 pm		at Nebraska	W 71–69 ^{OT}	16–3 (6–2)	Nebraska Coliseum; Lincoln, Nebraska
February 20, 1956; 7:35 pm, WOI		Missouri	L 66–73	16–4 (6–3)	Iowa State Armory; Ames, Iowa
February 25, 1956; 7:35 pm		at Kansas State	L 62–82	16–5 (6–4)	Ahearn Field House; Manhattan, Kansas
February 27, 1956; 9:05 pm		at Colorado	W 79–62	17–5 (7–4)	Balch Fieldhouse; Boulder, Colorado
March 8, 1956; 7:35 pm, WOI		Nebraska	W 94–74	18–5 (8–4)	Iowa State Armory; Ames, Iowa
*Non-conference game. ^{#}Rankings from AP poll. (#) Tournament seedings in parentheses. All times are in Central Time.
