= 1955–56 Kansas Jayhawks men's basketball team =

American college basketball season

1955–56 Kansas Jayhawks men's basketball
- Conference: Big Seven Conference
- Record: 14–9 (6–6 Big 7)
- Head coach: Phog Allen (39th season)
- Assistant coaches: Jack Eskridge (2nd season); Dick Harp (7th season)
- Captain: Dallas Dobbs
- Home arena: Allen Fieldhouse

1955–56 Big Seven Conference men's basketball standings
	Conf.				Overall
Team	W		L	PCT	W		L	PCT
Kansas State	9	–	3	.750	17	–	8	.680
Iowa State	8	–	4	.667	18	–	5	.783
Missouri	8	–	4	.667	15	–	7	.682
Colorado	7	–	5	.583	11	–	10	.524
Kansas	6	–	6	.500	14	–	9	.609
Nebraska	3	–	9	.250	7	–	16	.304
Oklahoma	1	–	11	.083	4	–	19	.174
Rankings from AP Poll

The 1955–56 Kansas Jayhawks men's basketball team represented the University of Kansas during the 1955–56 college men's basketball season. The Jayhawks played their home games at Allen Fieldhouse, their first full season playing at the arena. It was the 39th and final season under head coach Phog Allen, who was forced to retire after the season. The Jayhawks finished the season 14–9 overall and 6–6 in the Big Seven Conference and did not qualify for the NCAA Tournament.

== Roster ==
- Maurice King
- Gene Elstun
- Dallas Dobbs
- Lew Johnson
- Ron Johnston
- Bill Brainard
- John Parker
- Eddie Dater
- Lee Green
- Bob Lockley
- John Cleland
- Harry Jett
- Blaine Hollinger
- Jim Toft
- Gary Mowry
- Mark Boxberger

== Schedule ==
Date time, TV	Rank^{#}	Opponent^{#}	Result	Record	Site city, state
December 5*		Northwestern	W 91–70	1–0	Allen Fieldhouse; Lawrence, KS
December 7*		at Wichita	W 56–55	2–0	WSU Fieldhouse; Wichita, KS
December 10*		at Wisconsin	W 74–66	3–0	Wisconsin Field House; Madison, WI
December 17*	No. 18	at SMU	L 61–81	3–1	Perkins Gym; Dallas, TX
December 19*	No. 18	at Rice	L 66–75	3–2	Tudor Fieldhouse; Houston, TX
December 21*		SMU	W 62–58	4–2	Allen Fieldhouse; Lawrence, KS
December 28*		vs. Cornell	W 75–58	5-2	Municipal Auditorium; Kansas City, MO
December 29		vs. Missouri; Border War	W 73–56	6-2	Municipal Auditorium; Kansas City, MO
December 30		vs. Iowa State	L 56–67	6-3	Municipal Auditorium; Kansas City, MO
January 4*		at Oklahoma A&M	W 65–62	7-3	Gallagher-Iba Arena; Stillwater, OK
January 7		Oklahoma	W 77–65	8-3 (1-0)	Allen Fieldhouse; Lawrence, KS
January 9		at Missouri; Border War	L 54–76	8–4 (1–1)	Brewer Fieldhouse; Columbia, MO
January 14		at Kansas State; Sunflower Showdown	W 91–86	9–4 (2–1)	Ahearn Field House; Manhattan, KS
January 16		Iowa State	W 68–63	10–4 (3–1)	Allen Fieldhouse; Lawrence, KS
January 31		Oklahoma A&M	W 56–55	11–4	Allen Fieldhouse; Lawrence, KS
February 4		at Iowa State	L 63–79	11–5 (3–2)	The Armory; Ames, IA
February 6		Missouri; Border War	L 78–85	11–6 (3–3)	Allen Fieldhouse; Lawrence, KS
February 11		Nebraska	W 80–56	12–6 (4–3)	Allen Fieldhouse; Lawrence, KS
February 17		at Oklahoma	L 68–69	12–7 (4–4)	Field House; Norman, OK
February 25		at Nebraska	W 60–56	13–7 (5–4)	Nebraska Coliseum; Lincoln, NE
March 2		Colorado	W 54–44	14–7 (6–4)	Allen Fieldhouse; Lawrence, KS
March 6		Kansas State	L 68–79	14–8 (6–5)	Allen Fieldhouse; Lawrence, KS
March 10		at Colorado	L 67–75	14–9 (6–6)	Balch Fieldhouse; Boulder, CO
*Non-conference game. ^{#}Rankings from AP Poll. (#) Tournament seedings in parentheses.
