= 1956 ACC men's basketball tournament =

- Classification: Division I
- Season: 1955–56
- Teams: 8
- Site: Reynolds Coliseum; Raleigh, North Carolina
- Champions: NC State (3rd title)
- Winning coach: Everett Case (3rd title)
- MVP: Vic Molodet (NC State)

1955–56 ACC men's basketball standings
	Conf.				Overall
Team	W		L	PCT	W		L	PCT
No. 2 NC State †	11	–	3	.786	24	–	4	.857
No. 13 North Carolina	11	–	3	.786	18	–	5	.783
No. 16 Wake Forest	10	–	4	.714	19	–	9	.679
No. 17 Duke	10	–	4	.714	19	–	7	.731
Maryland	7	–	7	.500	14	–	10	.583
South Carolina	3	–	11	.214	9	–	14	.391
Virginia	3	–	11	.214	10	–	17	.370
Clemson	1	–	13	.071	9	–	17	.346
† 1956 ACC tournament winner Rankings from AP Poll

The 1956 Atlantic Coast Conference men's basketball tournament was held in Raleigh, North Carolina, at Reynolds Coliseum from March 1–3, 1956. NC State defeated Wake Forest, 76–64, to win the championship. Vic Molodet of NC State was named tournament MVP.

== Bracket ==
Quarterfinals; March 1
1	#5 NC State	88
8	Clemson	84
4	#11 Duke	94
5	Maryland	69
2	#8 North Carolina	81
7	Virginia	77
3	#20 Wake Forest	79
6	South Carolina	64

Semifinals; March 2
1	#5 NC State	91
4	#11 Duke	77
2	#8 North Carolina	56
3	#20 Wake Forest	77

Championship Game; March 3
1	#5 NC State	76
3	#20 Wake Forest	64
