= 1956 NCAA basketball championship game =

1956 NCAA Tournament Championship Game
National championship game
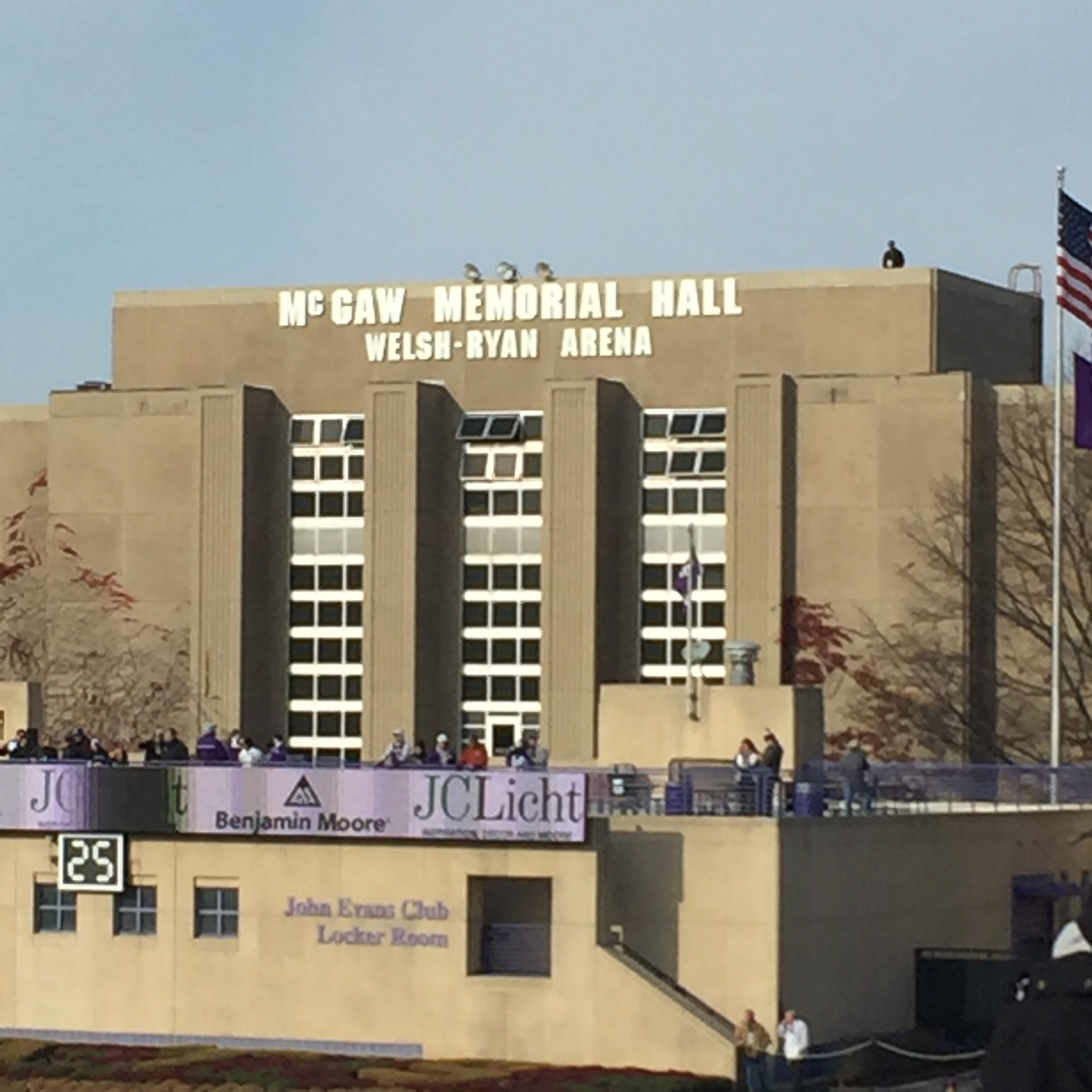
- McGaw Hall in Evanston, Illinois, hosted the championship game.
San Francisco Dons	Iowa Hawkeyes
CBA	Big Ten
(28-0)	(20-5)
83	71
Head coach: Phil Woolpert	Head coach: Bucky O'Connor
- AP: 1
- Coaches: 1
- AP: 4
- Coaches: 4
	1st half	2nd half	Total
San Francisco Dons	38	45	83
Iowa Hawkeyes	33	38	71
- Date: March 23, 1956
- Venue: McGaw Hall, Evanston, Illinois

The 1956 NCAA University Division Basketball Championship Game was the finals of the 1956 NCAA basketball tournament and it determined the national champion for the 1955-56 NCAA men's basketball season. The game was played on March 23, 1956, at McGaw Hall in Evanston, Illinois. It featured the defending national champion San Francisco Dons of the California Basketball Association, and the Iowa Hawkeyes of the Big Ten Conference.

As of 2024, this remains Iowa's sole appearance in the national championship game.

== Participating teams ==
=== San Francisco Dons ===
- Far West
  - San Francisco 72, UCLA 61
  - San Francisco 92, Utah 77
- Final Four
  - San Francisco 86, SMU 68

=== Iowa Hawkeyes ===
- Midwest
  - Iowa 97, Morehead State 83
  - Iowa 89, Kentucky 77
- Final Four
  - Iowa 83, Temple 76

== Game summary ==
March 23, 1956

#1 San Francisco Dons 83, #4 Iowa Hawkeyes 71
Scoring by half: 38-33, 45-38
Pts: Bill Russell 26; Rebs: Bill Russell 27	Pts: Carl Cain, Bill Seaberg 17; Rebs: Bill Logan 15

McGaw Hall, Evanston, Illinois
