= Carl Boldt =

American basketball player (1932–2015)

Personal information
- Born: October 22, 1932 Long Beach, California, U.S.
- Died: January 30, 2015 (aged 82) Panorama City, California, U.S.
- Listed height: 6 ft 5 in (1.96 m)

Career information
- High school: Verdugo Hills (Tujunga, California)
- College: Glendale CC (1951–1953); San Francisco (1955–1957)
- NBA draft: 1957: 7th round, 50th overall pick
- Drafted by: Detroit Pistons
- Position: Forward

Career highlights
- NCAA champion (1956); NIBL All-Star Game MVP (1959)
- Stats at Basketball Reference

Carl Robert Boldt (October 22, 1932 – January 30, 2015) was an American college basketball player who was an integral member to the University of San Francisco's national championship team in 1955–56. A 6'5" forward, Boldt started alongside future Hall of Famers Bill Russell and K. C. Jones as the Dons won their second-consecutive national championship with an unblemished 29–0 record. He scored 16 points in the 1956 national championship match against Iowa.

== College and army career ==
=== Junior college ===
Boldt graduated from Verdugo Hills High School in Tujunga, California before enrolling at Glendale Community College in the fall of 1951. At Verdugo, Boldt scored 1,024 points in 63 career games. He won Most Valuable Player (MVP) or was named to the all-tournament team in "most" of the tournaments he played in. For a time, Boldt was the nation's leading scorer at the junior college level. He earned All-America honors following his 1950–51 sophomore season.

=== Army ===
After graduating from Glendale, Boldt enrolled in the United States Army and was stationed at Fort Ord. He spent one year serving in the military from 1954 to 1955 and played on the Army's basketball squad. Boldt made the all-star team, and upon being honorably discharged he went home to California.

=== San Francisco ===
In the fall of 1955–56, Boldt enrolled at USF to play basketball. In his first season, the Dons, led by Russell and Jones, recorded an undefeated season en route to winning the NCAA Tournament. He was a starting forward. Years later, Boldt mentioned how it's been pointed out that he and Michael Jordan both scored 16 points in their respective NCAA national championship games. He said, "I had to laugh. I may have got 16 but I wouldn't be talking to anyone if we didn't have Bill Russell playing center and K. C. Jones playing guard for us."

The following season, Boldt's senior year in 1956–57, the USF squad had lost Russell, Jones and other key players due to graduation, so a third straight national championship seemed implausible. The Dons performed surprisingly well, won a third consecutive conference championship, and made it to the Final Four of the 1957 NCAA Tournament. The Dons beat Michigan State in the Third Place consolation game. Early into Boldt's final season, San Francisco's then-NCAA record 60-game winning streak was snapped on December 17, 1956. Coincidentally, the streak had begun exactly two years earlier on December 17, 1954. San Francisco compiled a 60–7 record in Boldt's two seasons on the team.

== Professional career and later life ==
Boldt was selected in the 7th round (50th overall) in the 1957 NBA draft by the Detroit Pistons following the conclusion of his collegiate career. He never played in the National Basketball Association, however. Boldt then spent some time playing for the Buchan Bakers in the National Industrial Basketball League (NIBL), where in 1958–59 he was a Western Conference All-Star. He was also named the All-Star Game MVP after holding Dick Boushka, the NIBL's leading scorer, to only six points (all coming off free throws). After Boldt quit playing basketball, he spent time in the 1970s working as a scout and assistant coach for the American Basketball Association's Los Angeles Stars. He then began his career in business, and in 1984 he entered the coffee industry. Boldt lived in Arcadia, California with his wife when he died after a period of declining health, on January 30, 2015.
