= Charlie Kendall =

American football player (born 1935)

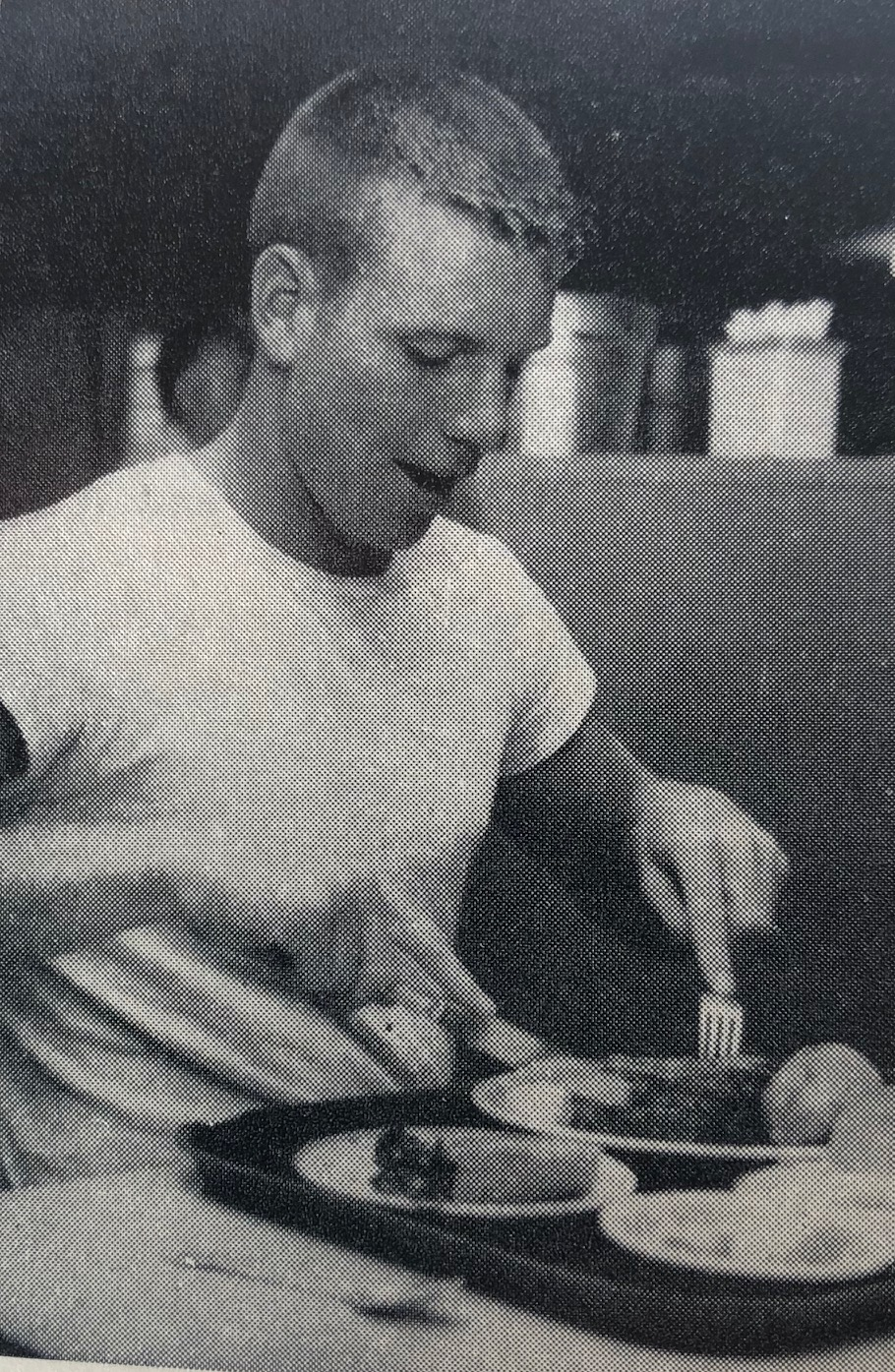
- 1958 UCLA yearbook

No. 34
- Position: Defensive back

Personal information
- Born: January 4, 1935 (age 91); Manila, Philippines
- Listed height: 6 ft 2 in (1.88 m)
- Listed weight: 165 lb (75 kg)

Career information
- High school: Verdugo Hills (Los Angeles)
- College: Los Angeles Valley (1955–1956); UCLA (1957–1958)

Career history
- Houston Oilers (1960)

Awards and highlights
- AFL champion (1960)
- Stats at Pro Football Reference

Charles Barton Kendall, Jr (born January 4, 1935) is an American former professional football defensive back who played one season with the Houston Oilers of the American Football League (AFL). He played college football at Los Angeles Valley College and the University of California, Los Angeles.

== Early life and college ==
Charles Barton Kendall, Jr was born on January 4, 1935, in Manila in the Philippines. He attended Verdugo Hills High School in Los Angeles, California.

Kendall first played college football at Los Angeles Valley College from 1955 to 1956. He was then a two-year letterman for the UCLA Bruins of the University of California, Los Angeles from 1957 to 1958.

== Professional career ==
Kendall signed with the Houston Oilers of the American Football League (AFL) in 1960. He played in all 14 games, starting six, for the Oilers during the team's inaugural 1960 season and recorded two interceptions. He also played in the 1960 AFL Championship Game, a 24–16 victory over the Los Angeles Chargers. Kendall became a free agent after the season.

== Personal life ==
In 1982, Kendall was reportedly interested in purchasing the Los Angeles Clippers from owner Donald Sterling but Sterling did not sell.
