= 1955–56 NCAA men's basketball season =

Men's university basketball season

- Preseason AP No. 1: None; San Francisco Dons (UP)
- NCAA Tournament: 1956
- Tournament dates: March 12, 1956 – March 24, 1956
- National Championship: McGaw Hall; Evanston, Illinois
- NCAA Champions: San Francisco Dons
- Helms National Champions: San Francisco Dons
- Other champions: Louisville Cardinals (NIT)
- Player of the Year (Helms): Bill Russell, San Francisco Dons

The 1955–56 NCAA men's basketball season began in December 1955, progressed through the regular season and conference tournaments, and concluded with the 1956 NCAA basketball tournament championship game on March 24, 1956, at McGaw Hall in Evanston, Illinois. The San Francisco Dons won their second NCAA national championship with an 83–71 victory over the Iowa Hawkeyes.

== Season headlines ==
- The Ivy League, which had been formally established as an athletic conference in 1954, played its first basketball season under that name. Previously, Ivy League schools had competed in the Eastern Intercollegiate Basketball League; today's Ivy League considers the EIBL part of its history.
- The Philadelphia Big 5, an informal association of colleges and universities in Philadelphia, Pennsylvania, focused on college basketball, began play. The Big 5 teams played a regular-season round robin schedule with one another each year through the 1990–91 season with the results determining an informal Big 5 championship, and revived the round-robin schedule during the 1999–2000 season.
- The NCAA tournament expanded from 24 to 25 teams.
- For the first time, the four regional competitions of the NCAA Tournament received names. In 1956, they were named the East, Midwest, West, and Far West Regions.
- For the last time, the NCAA held only a single championship tournament. The following season, it divided teams into a University Division and a College Division and began holding a separate tournament for each division.
- San Francisco won its second consecutive NCAA championship. With a record of 29–0, it became the first undefeated team to win the NCAA championship.
- Bill Russell of San Francisco completed his career (1954–1956) averaging 20.7 points and 20.3 rebounds per game. He was the first player to average more than 20 points and 20 rebounds per game during his career.

== Major rule changes ==
Beginning in 1955–56, the following rules changes were implemented:

- The free-throw lane was increased in width from 6 feet (1.8 m) to 12 feet (3.7 m).
- The two-shot penalty in the last three minutes of the game was eliminated. The "one-and-one" free throw, in which a player shoots a second free throw only if he makes his first, went into effect for the entire game.

== Season outlook ==
=== Pre-season polls ===
The top 20 from the AP Poll during the pre-season.

Associated Press
Ranking	Team
1	San Francisco
2	Kentucky
3	Utah
4	NC State
5	Iowa
6	Dayton
7	Illinois
7	UCLA
9	Duquesne
10	George Washington
11	Holy Cross
12	Marquette
13	Fordham
14	Washington
15	Alabama
16	Indiana
16	Saint Louis
18	Oregon State
18	SMU
20	Kansas

== Conference membership changes ==
School	Former conference	New conference
Bradley Braves	Independent	Missouri Valley Conference
Brown Bears	Eastern Intercollegiate Basketball League	Ivy League
Columbia Lions	Eastern Intercollegiate Basketball League	Ivy League
Cornell Big Red	Eastern Intercollegiate Basketball League	Ivy League
Dartmouth Big Green	Eastern Intercollegiate Basketball League	Ivy League
Fresno Bulldogs	Non-major independent	California Basketball Association
Harvard Crimson	Eastern Intercollegiate Basketball League	Ivy League
Loyola (Calif.) Lions	Independent	California Basketball Association
Penn Quakers	Eastern Intercollegiate Basketball League	Ivy League
Pepperdine Waves	Non-major independent	California Basketball Association
Princeton Tigers	Eastern Intercollegiate Basketball League	Ivy League
Western Reserve Red Cats	Mid-American Conference	Presidents' Athletic Conference (non-major)
Yale Bulldogs	Eastern Intercollegiate Basketball League	Ivy League

== Regular season ==
=== Conference ===
==== Conference winners and tournaments ====
Conference	Regular season winner	Conference player of the year	Conference tournament	Tournament venue (City)	Tournament winner
Atlantic Coast Conference	North Carolina & NC State	Ronnie Shavlik, NC State	1956 ACC men's basketball tournament	Reynolds Coliseum (Raleigh, North Carolina)	NC State
Big Seven Conference	Kansas State	None Selected	No Tournament		
Big Ten Conference	Iowa	None Selected	No Tournament		
Border Conference	Texas Tech	None Selected	No Tournament		
California Basketball Association	San Francisco	Bill Russell, San Francisco	No Tournament		
Ivy League	Dartmouth	None Selected	No Tournament		
Metropolitan New York Conference	St. Francis (NY)	None Selected	No Tournament		
Mid-American Conference	Marshall	None Selected	No Tournament		
Missouri Valley Conference	Houston	None Selected	No Tournament		
Mountain States (Skyline) Conference	Utah	None Selected	No Tournament		
Ohio Valley Conference	Morehead State, Tennessee Tech & Western Kentucky State	None Selected	No Tournament		
Pacific Coast Conference	UCLA	None Selected	No Tournament		
Southeastern Conference	Alabama	None Selected	No Tournament		
Southern Conference	George Washington & West Virginia	Darrell Floyd, Furman	1956 Southern Conference men's basketball tournament	Richmond Arena (Richmond, Virginia)	West Virginia
Southwest Conference	SMU	None Selected	No Tournament		
Western New York Little Three Conference	Canisius		No Tournament		
Yankee Conference	Connecticut		No Tournament		

==== Conference standings ====
1955–56 ACC men's basketball standings
	Conf.				Overall
Team	W		L	PCT	W		L	PCT
No. 2 NC State †	11	–	3	.786	24	–	4	.857
No. 13 North Carolina	11	–	3	.786	18	–	5	.783
No. 16 Wake Forest	10	–	4	.714	19	–	9	.679
No. 17 Duke	10	–	4	.714	19	–	7	.731
Maryland	7	–	7	.500	14	–	10	.583
South Carolina	3	–	11	.214	9	–	14	.391
Virginia	3	–	11	.214	10	–	17	.370
Clemson	1	–	13	.071	9	–	17	.346
† 1956 ACC tournament winner Rankings from AP Poll

1955–56 Big Seven Conference men's basketball standings
	Conf.				Overall
Team	W		L	PCT	W		L	PCT
Kansas State	9	–	3	.750	17	–	8	.680
Iowa State	8	–	4	.667	18	–	5	.783
Missouri	8	–	4	.667	15	–	7	.682
Colorado	7	–	5	.583	11	–	10	.524
Kansas	6	–	6	.500	14	–	9	.609
Nebraska	3	–	9	.250	7	–	16	.304
Oklahoma	1	–	11	.083	4	–	19	.174
Rankings from AP Poll

1955–56 Big Ten Conference men's basketball standings
	Conf.				Overall
Team	W		L	PCT	W		L	PCT
No. 4 Iowa	13	–	1	.929	20	–	6	.769
No. 10 Illinois	11	–	3	.786	18	–	4	.818
Ohio State	9	–	5	.643	16	–	6	.727
Purdue	9	–	5	.643	16	–	6	.727
Michigan State	7	–	7	.500	13	–	9	.591
Indiana	6	–	8	.429	13	–	9	.591
Minnesota	6	–	8	.429	11	–	11	.500
Michigan	4	–	10	.286	9	–	13	.409
Wisconsin	4	–	10	.286	6	–	16	.273
Northwestern	1	–	13	.071	2	–	20	.091
Rankings from AP Poll

1955–56 Border Conference men's basketball standings
	Conf.				Overall
Team	W		L	PCT	W		L	PCT
Texas Tech	8	–	4	.667	13	–	12	.520
New Mexico A&M	7	–	5	.583	16	–	7	.696
Texas Western	7	–	5	.583	12	–	10	.545
West Texas State	6	–	6	.500	12	–	10	.545
Arizona	6	–	6	.500	11	–	15	.423
Arizona State–Tempe	5	–	7	.417	11	–	15	.423
Hardin–Simmons	3	–	9	.250	7	–	18	.280
Rankings from AP Poll

1955–56 California Basketball Association men's basketball standings
	Conf.				Overall
Team	W		L	PCT	W		L	PCT
No. 1 San Francisco	14	–	0	1.000	29	–	0	1.000
Pacific	9	–	5	.643	15	–	11	.577
Loyola (Calif.)	9	–	5	.643	13	–	12	.520
Saint Mary's	8	–	6	.571	16	–	10	.615
San Jose State	8	–	6	.571	15	–	10	.600
Santa Clara	6	–	8	.429	8	–	16	.333
Fresno State	2	–	12	.143	9	–	17	.346
Pepperdine	0	–	14	.000	2	–	23	.080
Rankings from AP Poll

1955–56 Ivy League men's basketball standings
	Conf.				Overall
Team	W		L	PCT	W		L	PCT
Dartmouth	10	–	4	.714	18	–	11	.621
Columbia	9	–	5	.643	15	–	9	.625
Pennsylvania	9	–	5	.643	12	–	13	.480
Cornell	8	–	6	.571	11	–	13	.458
Yale	7	–	7	.500	15	–	11	.577
Princeton	7	–	7	.500	11	–	13	.458
Harvard	3	–	11	.214	8	–	16	.333
Brown	3	–	11	.214	7	–	18	.280
Rankings from AP Poll

1955–56 Metropolitan New York Conference men's basketball standings
	Conf.				Overall
Team	W		L	PCT	W		L	PCT
St. Francis (NY)	4	–	0	1.000	21	–	4	.840
Manhattan	4	–	1	.800	16	–	8	.667
Brooklyn	2	–	2	.500	11	–	7	.611
NYU	2	–	2	.500	10	–	8	.556
St. John's	3	–	3	.500	12	–	12	.500
Fordham	2	–	2	.500	11	–	12	.478
CCNY	0	–	7	.000	4	–	14	.222
Rankings from AP Poll

1955–56 Mid-American Conference men's basketball standings
	Conf.				Overall
Team	W		L	PCT	W		L	PCT
Marshall	10	–	2	.833	18	–	5	.783
Miami (OH)	8	–	4	.667	12	–	8	.600
Western Michigan	7	–	5	.583	11	–	9	.550
Toledo	6	–	6	.500	9	–	13	.409
Ohio	5	–	7	.417	13	–	11	.542
Kent State	5	–	7	.417	10	–	11	.476
Bowling Green	1	–	11	.083	4	–	19	.174
Rankings from AP Poll

1955–56 Missouri Valley Conference men's basketball standings
	Conf.				Overall
Team	W		L	PCT	W		L	PCT
Houston	9	–	3	.750	19	–	7	.731
Saint Louis	8	–	4	.667	18	–	7	.720
No. 19 Oklahoma A&M	8	–	4	.667	18	–	9	.667
Wichita	7	–	5	.583	14	–	12	.538
Tulsa	4	–	8	.333	16	–	10	.615
Detroit	3	–	9	.250	13	–	12	.520
Bradley	3	–	9	.250	13	–	13	.500
Rankings from AP Poll

1955–56 Mountain States Conference men's basketball standings
	Conf.				Overall
Team	W		L	PCT	W		L	PCT
No. 18 Utah	12	–	2	.857	22	–	6	.786
BYU	10	–	4	.714	18	–	8	.692
Utah State	7	–	7	.500	13	–	13	.500
Colorado A&M	7	–	7	.500	12	–	13	.480
Denver	6	–	8	.429	13	–	12	.520
New Mexico	5	–	9	.357	6	–	16	.273
Wyoming	5	–	9	.357	7	–	19	.269
Montana	4	–	10	.286	14	–	12	.538
Rankings from AP Poll

1955–56 Ohio Valley Conference men's basketball standings
	Conf.				Overall
Team	W		L	PCT	W		L	PCT
Tennessee Tech	7	–	3	.700	14	–	7	.667
Morehead State	7	–	3	.700	19	–	10	.655
Western Kentucky State	7	–	3	.700	16	–	12	.571
Murray State	6	–	4	.600	15	–	10	.600
Eastern Kentucky State	3	–	7	.300	9	–	16	.360
Middle Tennessee		–		–	6	–	15	.286
Rankings from AP Poll

1955–56 Pacific Coast Conference men's basketball standings
	Conf.				Overall
Team	W		L	PCT	W		L	PCT
No. 8 UCLA	16	–	0	1.000	22	–	6	.786
Washington	11	–	5	.688	15	–	11	.577
Stanford	10	–	6	.625	18	–	6	.750
California	10	–	6	.625	17	–	8	.680
USC	9	–	7	.563	14	–	12	.538
Oregon	5	–	11	.313	11	–	15	.423
Oregon State	5	–	11	.313	8	–	18	.308
Idaho	4	–	12	.250	6	–	19	.240
Washington State	2	–	14	.125	4	–	22	.154
Rankings from AP Poll

1955–56 Southeastern Conference men's basketball standings
	Conf.				Overall
Team	W		L	PCT	W		L	PCT
No. 5 Alabama	14	–	0	1.000	21	–	3	.875
No. 9 Kentucky	12	–	2	.857	20	–	6	.769
No. 12 Vanderbilt	11	–	3	.786	19	–	4	.826
Auburn	8	–	6	.571	11	–	10	.524
Tulane	7	–	7	.500	12	–	12	.500
Georgia Tech	6	–	8	.429	12	–	11	.522
Mississippi State	6	–	8	.429	12	–	12	.500
Tennessee	6	–	8	.429	10	–	14	.417
LSU	5	–	9	.357	7	–	17	.292
Florida	4	–	10	.286	11	–	12	.478
Ole Miss	4	–	10	.286	10	–	13	.435
Georgia	1	–	13	.071	3	–	21	.125
Rankings from AP Poll

1955–56 Southern Conference men's basketball standings
	Conf.				Overall
Team	W		L	PCT	W		L	PCT
George Washington	10	–	2	.833	19	–	7	.731
No. 20 West Virginia †	10	–	2	.833	21	–	9	.700
Virginia Tech	10	–	7	.588	14	–	11	.560
Richmond	8	–	6	.571	16	–	13	.552
William & Mary	9	–	7	.563	12	–	14	.462
Furman	7	–	7	.500	12	–	16	.429
Davidson	5	–	7	.417	10	–	15	.400
Washington and Lee	5	–	8	.385	12	–	16	.429
VMI	3	–	11	.214	4	–	19	.174
The Citadel	0	–	10	.000	2	–	19	.095
† Southern Conference Tournament winner Rankings from AP Poll

1955–56 Southwest Conference men's basketball standings
	Conf.				Overall
Team	W		L	PCT	W		L	PCT
No. 7 SMU	12	–	0	1.000	25	–	4	.862
Arkansas	9	–	3	.750	11	–	12	.478
Rice	8	–	4	.667	19	–	5	.792
Texas	5	–	7	.417	12	–	10	.545
Baylor	3	–	9	.250	6	–	17	.261
Texas A&M	3	–	9	.250	6	–	18	.250
TCU	2	–	10	.167	4	–	20	.167
Rankings from AP Poll

1955–56 Western New York Little Three Conference men's basketball standings
	Conf.				Overall
Team	W		L	PCT	W		L	PCT
Canisius	4	–	0	1.000	19	–	7	.731
Niagara	2	–	2	.500	20	–	7	.741
St. Bonaventure	0	–	4	.000	11	–	12	.478
Rankings from AP Poll

1955–56 Yankee Conference men's basketball standings
	Conf.				Overall
Team	W		L	PCT	W		L	PCT
Connecticut	6	–	1	.857	17	–	11	.607
Massachusetts	5	–	1	.833	17	–	6	.739
Rhode Island	6	–	2	.750	11	–	14	.440
Vermont	2	–	3	.400	6	–	12	.333
Maine	3	–	5	.375	6	–	12	.333
New Hampshire	0	–	10	.000	2	–	15	.118

=== Major independents ===
A total of 43 college teams played as major independents. Among them, Louisville (26–3) had the best winning percentage (.897) and Temple (27–4) finished with the most wins.

1955–56 NCAA men's basketball independents standings
	Conf.				Overall
Team	W		L	PCT	W		L	PCT
No. 6 Louisville		–		–	26	–	3	.897
No. 15 Temple		–		–	27	–	4	.871
No. 3 Dayton		–		–	25	–	4	.862
No. 14 Holy Cross		–		–	22	–	5	.815
Seton Hall		–		–	20	–	5	.800
Saint Joseph's		–		–	23	–	6	.793
Washington University		–		–	17	–	5	.773
Lafayette		–		–	20	–	7	.741
Memphis State		–		–	20	–	7	.741
No. 11 Oklahoma City		–		–	20	–	7	.741
Portland		–		–	20	–	8	.714
Cincinnati		–		–	17	–	7	.708
DePaul		–		–	16	–	8	.667
Colgate		–		–	17	–	9	.654
Syracuse		–		–	14	–	8	.636
Duquesne		–		–	17	–	10	.630
Seattle		–		–	18	–	11	.621
Butler		–		–	14	–	9	.609
Xavier		–		–	17	–	11	.607
La Salle		–		–	15	–	10	.600
Muhlenberg		–		–	15	–	10	.600
Pittsburgh		–		–	15	–	10	.600
Georgetown		–		–	13	–	11	.542
Marquette		–		–	13	–	11	.542
Miami (Fla.)		–		–	14	–	12	.538
Villanova		–		–	14	–	12	.538
Navy		–		–	10	–	9	.526
Creighton		–		–	11	–	12	.478
Gonzaga		–		–	13	–	15	.464
Penn State		–		–	12	–	14	.462
Valparaiso		–		–	12	–	14	.462
Army		–		–	10	–	13	.435
Bucknell		–		–	10	–	14	.417
Drake		–		–	10	–	14	.417
Loyola (Ill.)		–		–	10	–	14	.417
Saint Francis (Pa.)		–		–	10	–	14	.417
Loyola (La.)		–		–	10	–	15	.400
Lehigh		–		–	7	–	11	.389
Notre Dame		–		–	9	–	15	.375
Iona		–		–	8	–	14	.364
Siena		–		–	7	–	13	.350
Boston College		–		–	6	–	17	.261
Rutgers		–		–	3	–	15	.167
Rankings from AP Poll

=== Informal championships ===
Conference	Regular season winner	Most Valuable Player
Philadelphia Big 5	St. Joseph's	Guy Rodgers, Temple

Saint Joseph's finished with a 4–0 record in head-to-head competition among the Philadelphia Big 5.

=== Statistical leaders ===
Points per game			Rebounds percentage			Field goal percentage			Free throw percentage		
Player	School	PPG	Player	School	REB%	Player	School	FG%	Player	School	FT%
Darrell Floyd	Furman	33.8	Joe Holup	G. Washington	.256	Joe Holup	G. Washington	64.7	Bill Von Weyhe	Rhode Island	86.5
Robin Freeman	Ohio State	32.9	Charlie Tyra	Louisville	.235	Hal Greer	Marshall	60.1	Jackie Murdock	Wake Forest	85.7
Dan Swartz	Morehead St.	28.6	Jerry Harper	Alabama	.232	Odell Johnson	St. Mary's (CA)	56.3	Vic Molodet	NC State	85.2
Tom Heinsohn	Holy Cross	27.4	Bill Russell	San Francisco	.231	Raymond Downs	Texas	54.0	Dick Miani	Miami (FL)	83.7
Julius McCoy	Michigan St.	27.3	Charlie Slack	Marshall	.215	Angelo Lombardo	Manhattan	53.4	Bob McCarty	Virginia	83.2

== Post-season tournaments ==
=== NCAA tournament ===
Coach Phil Woolpert and his star Bill Russell successfully guided San Francisco to its second consecutive championship, capping an undefeated season. The Dons became the first team in college basketball history to go undefeated and win the NCAA tournament. Temple's Hal Lear was named tournament Most Outstanding Player.

==== Final Four ====
Played at McGaw Hall in Evanston, Illinois

National Semifinals
E	Temple	76
ME	Iowa	83
MW	SMU	68
W	San Francisco	86

National Championship Game
ME	Iowa	71
W	San Francisco	83
National Third-Place Game
E	Temple	90
MW	SMU	81

=== National Invitation tournament ===
Louisville won its first NIT title, defeating Dayton 83–80. Louisville's Charlie Tyra won MVP honors

==== NIT Semifinals and Final ====
Played at Madison Square Garden in New York City

Semifinals
Louisville	89
St. Joseph's	79
St. Francis (N.Y.)	58
Dayton	89

Final
Louisville	90
Dayton	83
Third place
St. Joseph's	93
St. Francis (N.Y.)	82

== Award winners ==
=== Consensus All-American teams ===
Consensus First Team
Player	Position	Class	Team
Robin Freeman	G	Senior	Ohio State
Sihugo Green	G	Senior	Duquesne
Tom Heinsohn	F	Senior	Holy Cross
Bill Russell	C	Senior	San Francisco
Ronnie Shavlik	F/C	Senior	North Carolina State

Consensus Second Team
Player	Position	Class	Team
Bob Burrow	F	Senior	Kentucky
Darrell Floyd	G	Senior	Furman
Rod Hundley	G/F	Junior	West Virginia
K.C. Jones	G	Senior	San Francisco
Willie Naulls	F	Senior	UCLA
Bill Uhl	C	Senior	Dayton

=== Major player of the year awards ===
- Helms Foundation Player of the Year: Bill Russell, San Francisco
- UPI Player of the Year: Bill Russell, San Francisco

=== Major coach of the year awards ===
- UPI Coach of the Year: Phil Woolpert, San Francisco

=== Other major awards ===
- Robert V. Geasey Trophy (Top player in Philadelphia Big 5): Guy Rodgers, Temple
- NIT/Haggerty Award (Top player in NYC area): Bill Thieben, Hofstra

== Coaching changes ==
A number of teams changed coaches during the season and after it ended.

Team	Former Coach	Interim Coach	New Coach	Reason
Alabama	John Dee		Eugene Lambert	
Bradley	Bob Vanatta		Chuck Orsborn	
Buffalo	Malcolm Eiken		Len Serfustini	
The Citadel	Hank Witt		Norm Sloan	
Clemson	Banks McFadden		Press Maravich	
Colorado	Bebe Lee		Sox Walseth	
Drake	Jack McClelland		John Bennington	
Georgetown	Buddy Jeannette		Tom Nolan	After four seasons, Jeannette resigned.
Houston	Alden Pasche		Guy Lewis	
Kansas	Phog Allen		Dick Harp	Allen retired following the season and was replaced by assistant Harp.
Memphis State	Eugene Lambert		Bob Vanatta	Lambert left to coach Alabama.
Middle Tennessee	Charles Greer		Ed Diddle Jr.	
New Hampshire	Bob Kerr		Bill Olsen	
Oregon	Bill Borcher		Steve Belko	
Pennsylvania	Ray Stanley		Jack McCloskey	
Rutgers	Donald White		Warren Harris	
Seattle	Al Brightman		John Castellani	
St. John's	Dusty DeStefano		Joe Lapchick	
Texas	Slue Hull		Marshall Hughes	
Yale	Howard Hobson		Joe Vancisin	
