= 1955–56 Washington Huskies men's basketball team =

American college basketball season

1955–56 Washington Huskies men's basketball
- Conference: Pacific Coast Conference
- Record: 15–11 (11–5 PCC)
- Head coach: Tippy Dye (6th season)
- Home arena: Hec Edmundson Pavilion

1955–56 Pacific Coast Conference men's basketball standings
	Conf.				Overall
Team	W		L	PCT	W		L	PCT
No. 8 UCLA	16	–	0	1.000	22	–	6	.786
Washington	11	–	5	.688	15	–	11	.577
Stanford	10	–	6	.625	18	–	6	.750
California	10	–	6	.625	17	–	8	.680
USC	9	–	7	.563	14	–	12	.538
Oregon	5	–	11	.313	11	–	15	.423
Oregon State	5	–	11	.313	8	–	18	.308
Idaho	4	–	12	.250	6	–	19	.240
Washington State	2	–	14	.125	4	–	22	.154
Rankings from AP Poll

The 1955–56 Washington Huskies men's basketball team represented the University of Washington for the 1955–56 NCAA college basketball season. Led by sixth-year head coach Tippy Dye, the Huskies were members of the Pacific Coast Conference and played their home games on campus at Hec Edmundson Pavilion in Seattle, Washington.

The Huskies were 15–11 overall in the regular season and 11–5 in conference play, second in the standings.
