= 1955–56 Duke Blue Devils men's basketball team =

American college basketball season

1955–56 Duke Blue Devils men's basketball
- Conference: Atlantic Coast Conference

Ranking
- Coaches: No. 18
- AP: No. 17
- Record: 19–7 (10–4 ACC)
- Head coach: Harold Bradley
- Home arena: Cameron Indoor Stadium

1955–56 ACC men's basketball standings
	Conf.				Overall
Team	W		L	PCT	W		L	PCT
No. 2 NC State †	11	–	3	.786	24	–	4	.857
No. 13 North Carolina	11	–	3	.786	18	–	5	.783
No. 16 Wake Forest	10	–	4	.714	19	–	9	.679
No. 17 Duke	10	–	4	.714	19	–	7	.731
Maryland	7	–	7	.500	14	–	10	.583
South Carolina	3	–	11	.214	9	–	14	.391
Virginia	3	–	11	.214	10	–	17	.370
Clemson	1	–	13	.071	9	–	17	.346
† 1956 ACC tournament winner Rankings from AP Poll

The 1955–56 Duke Blue Devils men's basketball team represented Duke University in the 1955–56 NCAA men's basketball season. The head coach was Harold Bradley and the team finished the season with an overall record of 19–7.
