= Verdugo Hills High School =

Public school in Los Angeles

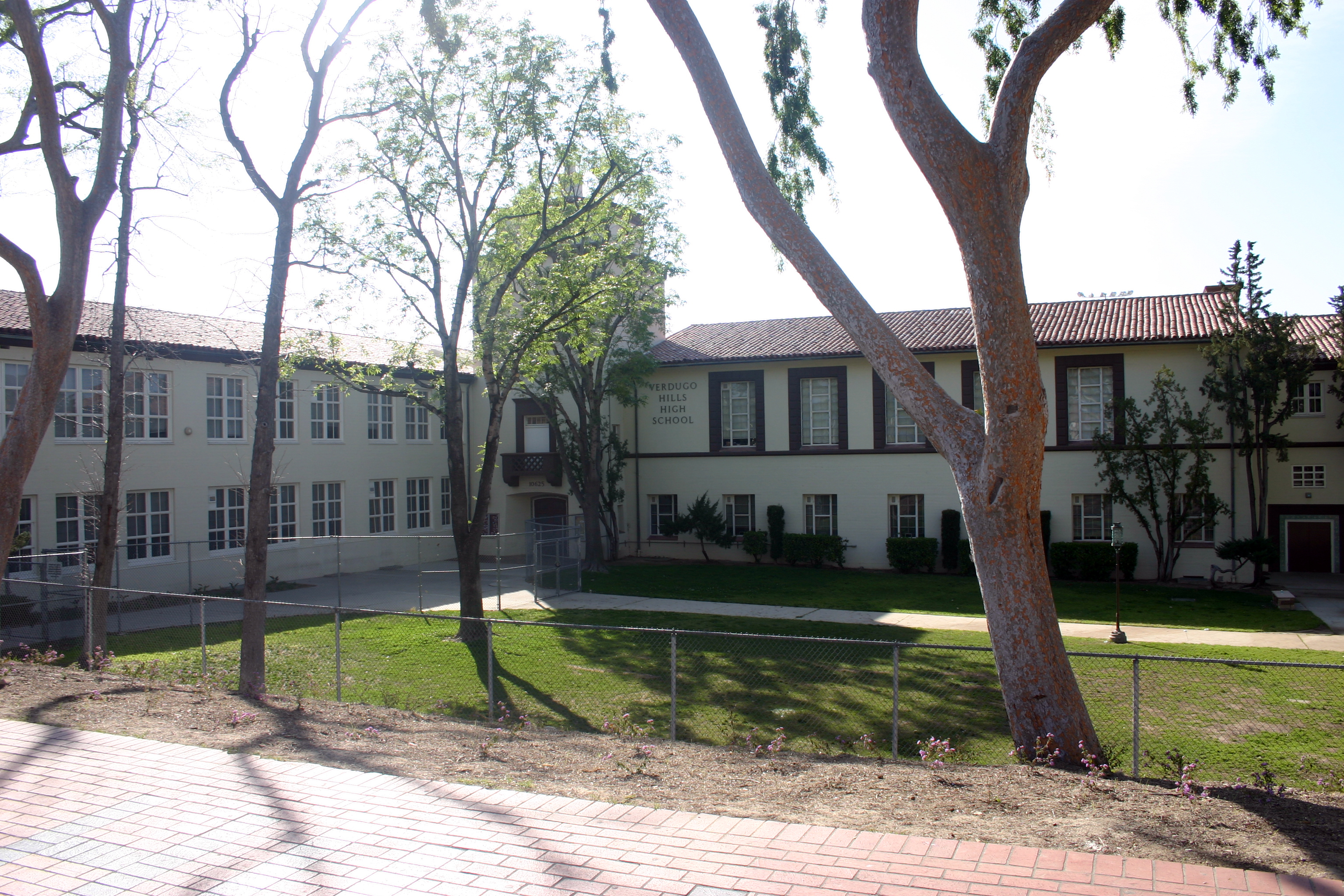

Location
- 10625 Plainview Avenue; Tujunga, Los Angeles, California 91042; 34.26218°N 118.2986°W

Information
- Type: Public
- Motto: Victory with Honor
- Established: 1937
- Status: Open
- School district: Los Angeles Unified School District
- Dean: Lisette Duran; Darren Fitzgerald
- Principal: Arturo Barcenas
- Assistant Principal: Marine Davtyan; Carrie Medeiros
- Staff: 67.11 (FTE)
- Grades: 9-12
- Enrollment: 1,198 (2023–2024)
- Student to teacher ratio: 17.85
- Colors: Black, red, and white
- Mascot: Don
- Newspaper: La Yuca
- School Television Broadcast: Eye on Verdugo (IOV)
- Website: verdugohillshs.lausd.org

Verdugo Hills High School (VHHS) is a public school located in the Tujunga community of Los Angeles, California, United States, within the Los Angeles Unified School District (LAUSD).

The school serves students from several areas of Los Angeles, including Sunland-Tujunga, Lake View Terrace, and portions of North Hollywood, Sun Valley, and Shadow Hills.

== History ==
The school officially opened for classes for the first time on September 13, 1937, with 437 students enrolled in grades 7 through 11. Verdugo Hills High School was built on the site of a lemon orchard next to the original Plainview Avenue Elementary School.

The school district was going to name the new school Calvin Coolidge High School, but Congressman John Steven McGroarty and others lobbied successfully to have the name changed to reflect the "green Verdugo hills" to the south which the campus overlooks.

It was in the Los Angeles City High School District until 1961, when it merged into LAUSD.

The 2009 opening of Sun Valley High School relieved Verdugo Hills of increasingly crowded conditions.

== Schedule ==
Verdugo Hills is the only school in LAUSD to host the Copernican Block Schedule. VHHS has experienced widespread success with this schedule since it was implemented in the fall of 1998. Most students have 4 classes per 10-week terms, each class lasting for 77 minutes. Semester courses are now 10 weeks in length and previous year-long courses are now 20 weeks. Athletics, band, and other activities have been moved to an optional 4th period. This gives an opportunity for a student to accomplish more before graduation. In addition, students taking the optional fourth period every semester can graduate a semester, or more, early. Students not opting to take a fourth period are released at 1:12 every day, allowing more time to complete homework or to work an after-school job.

== CIF Champions ==
The 2015 girls' volleyball team, led by captains Shelley Quema and Ashley Aglanao, became CIF Champions for 2 consecutive years.

On Saturday, June 2 - Charlie Rocca, an MLB prospect at the shortstop position, powered the Dons (23–13 overall and a co-East Valley league title with Polytechnic High School) to their 1st-ever CIF-LACS Division 1 title in a 4-2 extra-inning contest over the first-ranked Carson Colts at Dodgers Stadium. Junior starter Nick Rodriguez poured in eight fantastic innings and senior center-fielder Dakota Gray scored the game-winning run in the top of the 9th, in which Gray caught the final out. Junior Nick Masumoto, the CIF D1 Pitcher of the Year, finished the season with a 0.95 ERA and overall record of 8&4 in 88 1/3 innings, striking out 62 to nine walks. Rocca ends his Dons career with 25 bombs (14 of which came in 2018).

== Notable alumni ==
- Corey Allen, actor and director
- A. Michael Baldwin, actor
- Carl Boldt, American basketball player, University of San Francisco, 1955-56 At Verdugo, Boldt scored 1,024 points in 63 career games.
- Jan Brewer, governor of Arizona
- Ivan Dorschner, model and actor
- John Ingle, actor
- Bob James, former MLB pitcher
- Charlie Kendall, American football player
- A Martinez, actor
- Howard P. McKeon, U.S. congressman
- Jaye P. Morgan, singer, actress, entertainer
- Dick Smothers, entertainer
- Tom Smothers, entertainer
- Giancarlo Stanton, MLB player for the New York Yankees
- Ryan Starr, singer, reality TV star, travel blogger
- Steven A. White, admiral, U.S. Navy

== Filming location ==
In proximity to the Hollywood movie industry, the school website claims that VHHS has been "the location of choice for more movies, television shows and commercials than any other school in the world".

The school was a filming location in the following films, television movies, television series:

Films

- Corvette Summer (1978)
- Almost Summer (1978)
- Christine (1983)
- Better Off Dead (1985)
- River's Edge (1987)
- Heathers (1988)
- The Craft (1996)
- One Eight Seven (1997) - As John Quincy Adams High School
- Boys and Girls (2000)
- Clockstoppers (February 2001)
- Not Another Teen Movie (March 2001)
- Cursed (April 2003)
- Hercules in 3-D (November 2005)

Television movies

- Scandal In A Small Town (1988)
- I Know My First Name Is Steven (1989)
- The Tonya Harding Story
- The Brady Bunch Reunion
- The Jacksons: An American Dream (1992)
- Other Mothers (1993)
- The Great Mom Swap (1995)
- Skipper
- Killing Mr. Griffin (1997)
- Safety Patrol (1998)
- Gotta Kick It Up! (June 2001)
- 10 things I hate about you (2009) (Remake Movie)

Television series

- Quantum Leap
- Beverly Hills, 90210
- My So-Called Life (1994)
- TV-101 (1988–89)
- Dangerous Minds (1996–97)
- Moloney (1997)
- Beyond Belief: Fact or Fiction (1998)
- Felicity (1998)
- Hyperion Bay (1998)
- Rescue 77 (1999)
- Court TV (1999)
- Once and Again (1999)
- Get Real (1999)
- CSI: Crime Scene Investigation (2001)
- Lifetime Television (November 2001)
- MTV (December 2001)
- Miracles (2002, December)
- American Dreams (October and December 2002, January and March 2003, July 2004)
- Summerland (October 2004)
- Monk (May 2005)
- American Idol (November 2006)
- CSI: Crime Scene Investigation (2000- )
- The Secret Life of the American Teenager (2008- )
- Sons of Anarchy (2008)
- The Glee Project (2011)
- The Mindy Project (2012)
- The Bachelor (2016)
- Little Fires Everywhere (2020)

The music video of Selena Gomez's Bad Liar, My Chemical Romance's Teenagers, and Marilyn Manson's Fight song are filmed at the school, as well as Disney Channel's Legendary.
