= 1955–56 Ohio Bobcats men's basketball team =

American college basketball season

1955–56 Ohio Bobcats men's basketball
- Conference: Mid-American Conference
- Record: 13–11 (5–7 MAC)
- Head coach: Jim Snyder (7th season)
- Home arena: Men's Gymnasium

1955–56 Mid-American Conference men's basketball standings
	Conf.				Overall
Team	W		L	PCT	W		L	PCT
Marshall	10	–	2	.833	18	–	5	.783
Miami (OH)	8	–	4	.667	12	–	8	.600
Western Michigan	7	–	5	.583	11	–	9	.550
Toledo	6	–	6	.500	9	–	13	.409
Ohio	5	–	7	.417	13	–	11	.542
Kent State	5	–	7	.417	10	–	11	.476
Bowling Green	1	–	11	.083	4	–	19	.174
Rankings from AP Poll

The 1955–56 Ohio Bobcats men's basketball team represented Ohio University as a member of the Mid-American Conference in the college basketball season of 1955–56. The team was coached by Jim Snyder and played their home games at the Men's Gymnasium. The Bobcats finished the regular season with a record of 13–11 and finished fifth in the MAC regular season with a conference record of 5–7.

== Schedule ==
Date time, TV	Rank^{#}	Opponent^{#}	Result	Record	Site (attendance) city, state
Regular Season
12/3/1955*		at Indiana	L 74–93	0–1	
12/8/1955*		at Morris Harvey	W 91–71	1–1	
12/10/1955*		Ohio Wesleyan	W 94–85	2–1	
12/13/1955*		Marietta	W 85–54	3–1	
12/15/1955		at Marshall	L 71–87	3–2 (0–1)	
12/27/1955*		vs. Western Kentucky; Kentucky Invitational	L 60–76	3–3	
12/28/1955*		vs. Arizona; Kentucky Invitational	W 90–76	4–3	
12/29/1955*		vs. Morehead State; Kentucky Invitational	W 97–91	5–3	
1/5/1956*		at Georgetown (KY)	W 98–79	6–3	
MAC regular season
1/7/1956		at Kent State	W 80–72	7–3 (1–1)	
1/9/1956		Western Michigan	L 74–86	7–4 (1–2)	
1/12/1956		Marshall	L 63–72	7–5 (1–3)	
1/17/1956		at Miami (OH)	L 70–93	7–6 (1–4)	
1/21/1956		at Bowling Green	W 83–81	8–6 (2–4)	
1/25/1956		Toledo	W 89–79	9–6 (3–4)	
1/27/1956		Kent State	W 90–71	10–6 (4–4)	
2/4/1956*		at Baldwin-Wallace	L 84–85	10–7	
2/10/1956*		at Morehead State	L 67–110	10–8	
2/14/1956		Miami (OH)	L 84–85	10–9 (4–5)	
2/18/1956		Bowling Green	W 78–74	11–9 (5–5)	
2/22/1956		at Western Michigan	L 63–70	11–10 (5–6)	
2/25/1956*		Morehead State	W 113–99	12–10	
2/27/1956		at Toledo	L 67–77	12–11 (5–7)	
3/1/1956*		at Marietta	W 105–89	13–11	
*Non-conference game. ^{#}Rankings from AP Poll. (#) Tournament seedings in parentheses. All times are in Eastern Time.

== Statistics ==
=== Team statistics ===
Final 1955–56 statistics

Record	Ohio	OPP
Scoring	1970	1955
Scoring Average	82.08	81.46
Field goals – Att	705–1822	692–1858
Free throws – Att	560–819	571–825
Rebounds	1188	1188
Assists		
Turnovers		
Steals		
Blocked Shots		

=== Player statistics ===
			Minutes		Scoring		Total FGs			Free-Throws			Rebounds						
Player	GP	GS	Tot	Avg	Pts	Avg	FG	FGA	Pct	FT	FTA	Pct	Tot	Avg	A	PF	TO	Stl	Blk
Scotty Griesheimer	23	-			327	14.2	128	267	0.479	71	117	0.607	194	8.4		60			
Fred Moore	24	-			308	12.8	133	346	0.384	42	68	0.618	135	5.6		47			
Bob Evans	24	-			283	11.8	81	200	0.405	121	154	0.786	171	7.1		76			
Dick Garrison	24	-			275	11.5	82	189	0.434	111	148	0.750	183	7.6		75			
Bob Peters	24	-			190	7.9	69	155	0.445	52	77	0.675	101	4.2		58			
Harry Weinbrecht	24	-			177	7.4	58	191	0.304	61	85	0.718	67	2.8		43			
Don Sifft	23	-			153	6.7	63	176	0.358	27	41	0.659	74	3.2		32			
Larry Morrison	22	-			92	4.2	31	109	0.284	30	47	0.638	42	1.9		27			
Henry Pell	21	-			90	4.3	36	111	0.324	18	30	0.600	53	2.5		34			
John Tudor	13	-			33	2.5	10	29	0.345	13	29	0.448	35	2.7		13			
Larry Williams	11	-			24	2.2	8	21	0.381	8	13	0.615	7	0.6		8			
Russ Grooms	8	-			14	1.8	5	19	0.263	4	8	0.500	11	1.4		12			
Bill Oppenheimer	7	-			2	0.3	1	7	0.143	0	0	0.000	2	0.3		3			
John Paulette	3	-			2	0.7	0	0	0.000	2	2	1.000	0	0.0		0			
Duane Baker	3	-			0	0.0	0	0	0.000	0	0	0.000	0	0.0		2			
Total	24	-	-	-	1970	82.1	705	1822	0.387	560	819	0.684	1188	49.5		490			
Opponents	24	-	-	-	1955	81.5	692	1858	0.372	571	825	0.692	1188	49.5		478			

Legend
GP	Games played	GS	Games started	Avg	Average per game
FG	Field-goals made	FGA	Field-goal attempts	Off	Offensive rebounds
Def	Defensive rebounds	A	Assists	TO	Turnovers
Blk	Blocks	Stl	Steals	High	Team high
