= 1955–56 NCAA men's basketball rankings =

- Season: 1955–56
- NCAA Tournament: 1956
- Preseason No. 1: San Francisco
- NCAA Tournament Champions: San Francisco
NCAA men's basketball rankings


The 1955–56 NCAA men's basketball rankings was made up of two human polls, the AP Poll and the Coaches Poll.

== Legend ==
	Increase in ranking
	Decrease in ranking
	New to rankings from previous week
Italics	Number of first place votes
(#–#)	Win–loss record
т	Tied with team above or below also with this symbol

== AP Poll ==
	Week 1 Dec. 5	Week 2 Dec. 12	Week 3 Dec. 19	Week 4 Dec. 26	Week 5 Jan. 2	Week 6 Jan. 9	Week 7 Jan. 16	Week 8 Jan. 23	Week 9 Jan. 30	Week 10 Feb. 6	Week 11 Feb. 13	Week 12 Feb. 20	Week 13 Feb. 27	Week 14 Mar. 5	Final Mar. 12	
1.	San Francisco (2–0)	San Francisco (3–0)	San Francisco (5–0)	San Francisco (7–0)	San Francisco (10–0)	San Francisco (11–0)	San Francisco (13–0)	San Francisco (13–0)	San Francisco (14–0)	San Francisco (15–0)	San Francisco (18–0)	San Francisco (20–0)	San Francisco (21–0)	San Francisco (24–0)	San Francisco (25–0)	1.
2.	Kentucky (1–0)	NC State (4–0)	NC State (7–0)	Dayton (8–0)	NC State (11–0)	Dayton (11–0)	Dayton (12–0)	Dayton (14–0)	Dayton (14–1)	Dayton (16–1)	Dayton (18–1)	Illinois (16–1)	Illinois (17–2)	NC State (24–3)	NC State (24–3)	2.
3.	NC State (2–0)	Utah (3–0)	Utah (5–0)	NC State (8–0)	Dayton (9–0)	NC State (11–1)	NC State (12–1)	Kentucky (10–2)	Vanderbilt (14–1)	Vanderbilt (15–1)	Illinois (14–1)	Louisville (21–2)	Dayton (22–2)	Dayton (23–3)	Dayton (23–3)	3.
4.	Iowa (1–0)	Iowa (2–0)	Dayton (6–0)	North Carolina (5–0)	Vanderbilt (7–1)	Vanderbilt (8–2)	Kentucky (9–2)	NC State (13–2)	NC State (14–2)	NC State (16–2)	Louisville (19–2)	Dayton (20–2)	Alabama (18–3)	Alabama (20–3)	Iowa (17–5)	4.
5.	Utah (1–0)	Alabama (4–0)	BYU (6–0)	Vanderbilt (6–1)	North Carolina (7–1)	Kentucky (7–2)	Vanderbilt (12–1)	Illinois (10–1)	Louisville (16–1)	Louisville (18–1)	NC State (18–2)	Vanderbilt (18–2)	NC State (21–3)	Iowa (16–5)	Alabama (21–3)	5.
6.	Alabama (2–0)	Duquesne (3–0)	North Carolina (6–0)	Iowa (3–1)	Kentucky (6–2)	Duke (9–2)	Illinois (10–1)	Temple (11–0)	Illinois (11–1)	Illinois (12–1)	Vanderbilt (16–2)	NC State (19–3)	Louisville (22–3)	Louisville (26–3)	Louisville (26–3)	6.
7.	Dayton (2–0)	Dayton (4–0)	Holy Cross (5–0)	Utah (5–2)	George Washington (9–1)	Ohio State (8–1)	Duke (12–2)	Vanderbilt (13–1)	Temple (13–0)	Kentucky (13–3)	Kentucky (15–3)	Alabama (16–3)	Vanderbilt (19–3)	Illinois (18–3)	SMU (22–2)	7.
8.	Illinois (0–0)	BYU (4–0)	Vanderbilt (4–0)	Duke (6–0)	Iowa State (9–1)	Illinois (7–1)	Temple (10–0)	North Carolina (13–2)	Kentucky (10–3)	Duke (13–3)	Alabama (14–3)	Kentucky (16–4)	North Carolina (17–4)	SMU (22–2)	UCLA (19–5)	8.
9.	Duquesne (1–0)	Vanderbilt (4–0)	Kentucky (4–1)	Illinois (5–1)	Illinois (6–1)	North Carolina (8–2)	North Carolina (12–2)	Louisville (15–1)	North Carolina (13–2)	Temple (14–1)	Temple (17–1)	North Carolina (16–3)	SMU (21–2)	Kentucky (19–5)	Kentucky (19–5)	9.
10.	BYU (2–0)	Holy Cross (3–0)	Iowa (3–1)	Oklahoma City (6–0)	Ohio State (7–1)	Temple (8–0)	Louisville (13–1)	Duke (12–2)	Duke (12–2)	Alabama (12–3)	North Carolina (15–3)	Temple (19–1)	Iowa (14–5)	UCLA (19–5)	Illinois (18–4)	10.
11.	Holy Cross (1–0)	Temple (3–0)	George Washington (6–0)	Louisville (7–0)	Duke (8–1)	Holy Cross (9–2)	Ohio State (9–2)	Holy Cross (13–2)	Saint Louis (12–2)	Saint Louis (14–2)	Duke (15–4)	Duke (16–5)	Duke (18–6)	Vanderbilt (19–4)	Oklahoma City (18–6)	11.
12.	Oklahoma City (2–0)	Kentucky (1–1)	Temple (5–0)	George Washington (6–1)	Memphis State (7–0)	Indiana (8–1)	Holy Cross (11–2)	Alabama (10–3)	Alabama (11–3)	North Carolina (13–3)	SMU (17–2)	SMU (19–2)	Kentucky (17–5)	Holy Cross (22–4)	Vanderbilt (19–4)	12.
13.	George Washington (1–0)	George Washington (3–0)	Marquette (5–1)	Kentucky (5–2)	Indiana (6–1)	Louisville (10–1)	Alabama (9–3)	Iowa (6–5)	St. Francis Brooklyn (13–0)	Holy Cross (16–2)	St. Francis Brooklyn (16–0)	Iowa (12–5)	UCLA (17–5)	Temple (21–3)	North Carolina (18–5)	13.
14.	Marquette (1–0) т	Cincinnati (3–0)	Duke (5–0)	Holy Cross (5–1)	Holy Cross (7–2)	George Washington (9–3)	Oklahoma City (10–2)	Cincinnati (12–3)	Holy Cross (13–2)	Oklahoma City (15–4)	Oklahoma City (16–4)	Houston (18–3)	Temple (20–3)	West Virginia (21–8)	Holy Cross (22–4)	14.
15.	West Virginia (1–0) т	West Virginia (3–0)	Oklahoma City (4–0)	Ohio State (6–1)	Tulsa (10–1)	Iowa State (8–2)	Memphis State (11–1)	St. Francis Brooklyn (11–0)	Oklahoma City (13–4)	SMU (16–2)	Iowa (10–5)	UCLA (15–5)	Holy Cross (21–4)	North Carolina (18–5)	Temple (23–3)	15.
16.	UCLA (0–2) т	North Carolina (3–0)	Alabama (4–2)	Michigan State (4–0)	Temple (6–0)	Oklahoma City (9–1)	Utah (11–3)	Oklahoma City (12–4)	Memphis State (13–2)	St. Francis Brooklyn (15–0)	Holy Cross (17–3)	St. Francis Brooklyn (18–1)	Oklahoma City (17–6)	Oklahoma City (18–6)	Wake Forest (19–9)	16.
17.	Ohio State (1–1) т	Saint Louis (3–0)	Illinois (3–1)	Rice (8–0) т	Alabama (6–3)	Memphis State (9–1)	Saint Louis (10–2)	Saint Louis (11–2)	SMU (14–2)	Iowa (8–5)	Saint Louis (14–4)	Holy Cross (19–4)	Kansas State (15–6)	Houston (19–5)	Duke (19–7)	17.
18.	La Salle (1–1)	Kansas (3–0)	Indiana (3–1) т	Temple (5–0) т	Rice (9–1)	Wake Forest (8–5)	UCLA (8–5)	SMU (13–2)	Marshall (13–2)	UCLA (11–5)	Houston (17–3)	Oklahoma City (16–5)	Houston (19–4)	Wake Forest (19–9)	Utah (21–5)	18.
19.	Stanford (2–0)	Indiana (2–0)	Memphis State (5–0) т	Alabama (5–2)	West Virginia (7–2)	Alabama (7–3)	SMU (13–2)	Memphis State (12–2)	Iowa (7–5)	George Washington (12–4)	Memphis State (17–3)	George Washington (17–5)	Saint Louis (17–5)	Duke (19–7)	Oklahoma A&M (18–8)	19.
20.	Minnesota (1–0)	Oklahoma City (2–0)	Duquesne (4–2)	BYU (6–2)	Michigan State (5–1) т Cincinnati (7–2) т	Cincinnati (8–2) т Utah (8–3) т	Iowa (5–5) т Oklahoma A&M (11–3) т	Oklahoma A&M (11–2)	UCLA (9–5)	Cincinnati (13–3)	UCLA (13–5)	Iowa State (16–3)	Wake Forest (17–8)	Utah (21–5)	West Virginia (21–8)	20.
	Week 1 Dec. 5	Week 2 Dec. 12	Week 3 Dec. 19	Week 4 Dec. 26	Week 5 Jan. 2	Week 6 Jan. 9	Week 7 Jan. 16	Week 8 Jan. 23	Week 9 Jan. 30	Week 10 Feb. 6	Week 11 Feb. 13	Week 12 Feb. 20	Week 13 Feb. 27	Week 14 Mar. 5	Final Mar. 12	
		Dropped: Illinois (1–1); Marquette (1–1); UCLA (2–2); Ohio State (1–1); La Salle (1–1); Stanford (1–1); Minnesota (1–1)	Dropped: Saint Louis (4–1); Cincinnati (3–2); West Virginia (3–2); Kansas (3–2)	Dropped: Marquette (5–2); Indiana (5–1); Memphis State (5–0)	Dropped: Iowa (3–4); Oklahoma City (7–1); Louisville (8–1); BYU (7–3)	Dropped: Rice; Michigan State (6–2)	Dropped: Iowa State (9–3); George Washington (9–4)	Dropped: Utah (12–3); UCLA (8–5)	Dropped: Cincinnati (12–3)	Dropped: Memphis State (14–3); Marshall (14–3)	Dropped: George Washington (13–5); Cincinnati (14–4)	Dropped: Memphis State (18–4)	Dropped: Iowa State (17–4); St. Francis Brooklyn (18–2)	Dropped: Kansas State (15–8); Saint Louis (17–6)	Dropped: Houston (19–6)	

== UP Poll ==
	Preseason	Week 2 Dec. 6	Week 3 Dec. 13	Week 4 Dec. 20	Week 5 Dec. 27	Week 6 Jan. 3	Week 7 Jan. 10	Week 8 Jan. 17	Week 9 Jan. 24	Week 10 Jan. 31	Week 11 Feb. 7	Week 12 Feb. 14	Week 13 Feb. 21	Week 14 Feb. 28	Final Mar. 6	
1.	San Francisco	San Francisco (2–0)	San Francisco (3–0)	San Francisco (5–0)	San Francisco (7–0)	San Francisco (10–0)	San Francisco (11–0)	San Francisco (13–0)	San Francisco (13–0)	San Francisco (14–0)	San Francisco (15–0)	San Francisco (18–0)	San Francisco (20–0)	San Francisco (21–0)	San Francisco (24–0)	1.
2.	Kentucky	Kentucky (1–0)	NC State (4–0)	Utah (5–0)	Dayton (8–0)	Dayton (9–0)	Dayton (11–0)	Dayton (12–0)	Dayton (14–0)	Dayton (14–1)	Dayton (16–1)	Dayton (18–1)	Illinois (16–1)	Dayton (22–2)	NC State (24–3)	2.
3.	Utah	NC State (2–0)	Utah (3–0)	NC State (7–0)	NC State (8–0)	NC State (11–0)	NC State (11–1)	NC State (12–1)	Illinois (10–1)	Illinois (11–1)	Illinois (12–1)	Illinois (14–1)	Dayton (20–2)	Illinois (17–2)	Dayton (23–3)	3.
4.	NC State	Utah (1–0)	Iowa (2–0)	Dayton (6–0)	North Carolina (5–0)	North Carolina (7–1)	Kentucky (7–2)	Illinois (10–1)	Kentucky (10–2)	NC State (14–2)	NC State (16–2)	NC State (18–2)	Louisville (21–2)	NC State (21–3)	Iowa (16–5)	4.
5.	Iowa	Iowa (1–0)	Alabama (4–0)	BYU (6–0)	Iowa (3–1)	Illinois (6–1)	Illinois (7–1)	Kentucky (9–2)	NC State (13–2)	Vanderbilt (14–1)	Louisville (18–1)	Louisville (19–2)	NC State (19–3)	Louisville (22–3)	Alabama (20–3)	5.
6.	Dayton	Dayton (2–0)	Duquesne (3–0)	Iowa (3–1)	Utah (5–2)	Kentucky (6–2)	Indiana (8–1)	Vanderbilt (12–1)	North Carolina (13–2)	Louisville (16–1)	Vanderbilt (15–1)	Vanderbilt (16–2)	Vanderbilt (18–2)	Alabama (18–3)	SMU (22–2)	6.
7.	Illinois т	Illinois (0–0)	Dayton (4–0)	Holy Cross (5–0)	Holy Cross (5–1)	Iowa State (8–1)	SMU (12–2)	Duke (12–2) т	Temple (11–0)	Temple (13–0)	Kentucky (13–3)	Kentucky (15–3)	SMU (19–2)	SMU (21–2)	Louisville (26–3)	7.
8.	UCLA	Duquesne (1–0)	BYU (4–0)	North Carolina (6–0)	Illinois (5–1) т	Utah (6–3)	Vanderbilt (8–2) т	SMU (13–2) т	Vanderbilt (13–1)	North Carolina (13–2)	Temple (14–1)	SMU (17–2)	Temple (19–1)	North Carolina (17–4)	Illinois (18–3)	8.
9.	Duquesne	Holy Cross (1–0)	Vanderbilt (4–0)	Kentucky (4–1)	Louisville (7–0) т	Holy Cross (7–2)	Duke (9–2) т	Temple (10–0)	SMU (13–2)	Kentucky (10–3)	SMU (16–2)	Temple (17–1)	North Carolina (16–3)	Iowa (14–5)	UCLA (19–5)	9.
10.	George Washington	BYU (2–0)	Holy Cross (3–0)	Marquette (5–1)	Marquette (5–2)	George Washington (9–1) т	North Carolina (8–2)	Louisville (13–1)	Louisville (15–1)	SMU (14–2)	Duke (13–3)	North Carolina (15–3)	Kentucky (16–4)	UCLA (17–5)	Vanderbilt (19–4)	10.
11.	Holy Cross	George Washington (1–0)	Temple (3–0)	George Washington (6–0)	BYU (6–2)	SMU (10–2) т	Holy Cross (9–2)	North Carolina (12–2)	Duke (12–2)	Duke (12–2)	Saint Louis (14–2)	Alabama (14–3)	Alabama (16–3)	Vanderbilt (19–3)	North Carolina (18–5)	11.
12.	Marquette	Indiana (1–0)	Kentucky (1–1)	SMU (6–1)	Kentucky (5–2)	Louisville (9–1)	Utah (8–3)	Utah (11–3)	Utah (12–3)	Iowa (7–5)	North Carolina (13–3)	UCLA (13–5)	Iowa (12–5)	Temple (20–3)	Kentucky (19–5)	12.
13.	Fordham	Saint Louis (1–0)	George Washington (3–0)	Illinois (3–1) т	Vanderbilt (6–1)	Rice (9–1)	Louisville (10–1)	Holy Cross (11–2)	Holy Cross (13–2) т	UCLA (9–5)	UCLA (11–5)	Iowa (10–5)	UCLA (15–5)	Kentucky (17–5)	Utah (21–5)	13.
14.	Washington	UCLA (0–2)	Cincinnati (3–0)	Saint Louis (4–1) т	Rice (8–0)	Indiana (6–1) т	Temple (8–0)	UCLA (8–5)	Iowa (6–5) т	Saint Louis (12–2)	Alabama (12–3) т	Duke (15–4)	Houston (18–3)	Utah (19–5)	Temple (21–3)	14.
15.	Alabama	Marquette (1–0)	West Virginia (3–0)	Louisville (6–0)	Duke (6–0)	UCLA (4–5) т	Ohio State (8–1)	Ohio State (9–2)	UCLA (8–5)	Holy Cross (13–2)	Holy Cross (16–2) т	Saint Louis (14–4)	Holy Cross (19–4) т	Duke (18–6) т	Holy Cross (22–4)	15.
16.	Indiana т	Stanford (2–0)	North Carolina (3–0)	Temple (5–0) т	Saint Louis (6–2)	Iowa (3–4)	Iowa State (8–2)	BYU (11–3)	Cincinnati (12–3)	Utah (14–3)	Iowa (8–5)	Holy Cross (17–3)	Utah (17–5) т	Saint Louis (17–5) т	Oklahoma City (18–6)	16.
17.	Saint Louis т	Kansas (0–0)	Saint Louis (3–0)	Duquesne (4–2) т	Indiana (5–1)	Tulsa (10–1)	UCLA (6–5)	Iowa State (9–3) т	Saint Louis (11–2)	Alabama (11–3)	BYU (13–5)	BYU (14–6) т	St. Francis Brooklyn (18–1)	Cincinnati (16–5) т	Saint Louis (17–6)	17.
18.	Oregon State т	Alabama (2–0)	Kansas (3–0)	Ohio State (5–1) т	Alabama (5–2)	Duke (8–1)	Marquette (8–4) т	Stanford (10–1) т	Alabama (10–3) т	St. Francis Brooklyn (13–0)	St. Francis Brooklyn (15–0)	Utah (16–5) т	Iowa State (16–3)	Houston (19–4)	Duke (19–7)	18.
19.	SMU т	Seton Hall (2–0)	Indiana (2–0)	Vanderbilt (4–0)	George Washington (6–1) т	Temple (6–0)	Saint Louis (8–2) т	Saint Louis (10–2) т	Marquette (10–4) т	BYU (11–5)	Utah (14–5)	Houston (17–3)	Cincinnati (15–4) т	Kansas State (15–6)	Canisius (17–6)	19.
20.	Kansas	Louisville (1–0)	Oklahoma City (2–1)	Indiana (3–1)	SMU (7–1) т	Stanford (6–0)	Michigan (5–4)	Marquette (10–4) т	Stanford (11–2)	Canisius (9–5) т Cincinnati (12–3) т	Stanford (13–2)	Cincinnati (14–4) т Iowa State (15–3) т Xavier (12–7) т	Xavier (13–9) т	Holy Cross (21–4) т Ohio State (15–5) т	Seattle (17–9)	20.
	Preseason	Week 2 Dec. 6	Week 3 Dec. 13	Week 4 Dec. 20	Week 5 Dec. 27	Week 6 Jan. 3	Week 7 Jan. 10	Week 8 Jan. 17	Week 9 Jan. 24	Week 10 Jan. 31	Week 11 Feb. 7	Week 12 Feb. 14	Week 13 Feb. 21	Week 14 Feb. 28	Final Mar. 6	
		Dropped: Fordham; Washington; Oregon State; SMU	Dropped: Illinois (1–1); UCLA (2–2); Marquette (1–1); Stanford (1–1); Louisville	Dropped: Alabama; Cincinnati; West Virginia (3–2); Kansas; Oklahoma City	Dropped: Temple (5–0); Duquesne; Ohio State (6–1)	Dropped: Marquette; BYU; Vanderbilt; Saint Louis; Alabama	Dropped: George Washington; Rice; Iowa (4–5); Tulsa; Stanford	Dropped: Indiana; Michigan	Dropped: Ohio State; BYU; Iowa State	Dropped: Marquette; Stanford	Dropped: Canisius; Cincinnati	Dropped: St. Francis Brooklyn; Stanford	Dropped: Duke; Saint Louis; BYU	Dropped: Iowa State; Xavier	Dropped: Cincinnati (17–6); Houston (19–5); Kansas State (16–7); Ohio State (16–6)	
