= 1955–56 Marshall Thundering Herd men's basketball team =

American college basketball season

1955–56 Marshall Thundering Herd men's basketball

Mid-American Conference champions

NCAA tournament, first round
- Conference: Mid-American Conference
- Record: 18–5 (10–2 MAC)
- Head coach: Jule Rivlin (1st season)
- Home arena: Veterans Memorial Fieldhouse

1955–56 Mid-American Conference men's basketball standings
	Conf.				Overall
Team	W		L	PCT	W		L	PCT
Marshall	10	–	2	.833	18	–	5	.783
Miami (OH)	8	–	4	.667	12	–	8	.600
Western Michigan	7	–	5	.583	11	–	9	.550
Toledo	6	–	6	.500	9	–	13	.409
Ohio	5	–	7	.417	13	–	11	.542
Kent State	5	–	7	.417	10	–	11	.476
Bowling Green	1	–	11	.083	4	–	19	.174
Rankings from AP Poll

The 1955–56 Marshall Thundering Herd men's basketball team represented Marshall College (now Marshall University) during the 1955–56 NCAA men's basketball season. The Thundering Herd, led by first-year head coach Jule Rivlin, played their home games at the Veterans Memorial Fieldhouse as members of the Mid-American Conference. They finished the season 18–5, 10–2 in MAC play to finish in first place. For the first time in school history, they received the MAC's automatic bid to the NCAA tournament where they lost to Morehead State in the first round.

The season also marked the first time in the program's history that the Thundering Herd were ranked in the AP Poll during the season, coming in at No. 18 on the week of January 31.

== Roster ==
1955–56 Marshall Thundering Herd men's basketball team
Players
Coaches

Pos.	#	Name	Height	Weight	Year	Hometown
		Bob Ashley	6 ft 4 in (1.93 m)	—
		Dave Dingess	6 ft 1 in (1.85 m)	—
		Jack Freeman	6 ft 1 in (1.85 m)	—
G	16	Hal Greer	6 ft 2 in (1.88 m)	—	So
		Joe Hunnicutt	6 ft 3 in (1.91 m)	—
		Dave Kirk	6 ft 4 in (1.93 m)	—
		John Mayfield	6 ft 5 in (1.96 m)	—
		Sonny Parkins	6 ft 2 in (1.88 m)	—
		Jerry Pierson	5 ft 7 in (1.7 m)	—
		Cebe Price	6 ft 2 in (1.88 m)	—
	17	Charlie Slack	6 ft 4 in (1.93 m)	—	Sr
		Paul Underwood	6 ft 2 in (1.88 m)	—
		Ron Williamson	—	—
		Bill Zban	—	—

Head coach

- Jule Rivlin

Assistant coach(es)

- None

Legend

- (C) Team captain
- (S) Suspended
- (I) Ineligible
- (W) Walk-on
- Injured
- Current redshirt

== Schedule/results ==
Date time, TV	Rank^{#}	Opponent^{#}	Result	Record	Site city, state
Regular Season
Dec 8, 1955*		Spring Hill	W 83–69	1–0	Veterans Memorial Fieldhouse; Huntington, WV
Dec 10, 1955*		Washington and Lee	W 115–83	2–0	Veterans Memorial Fieldhouse; Huntington, WV
Dec 15, 1955		Ohio	W 87–71	3–0 (1–0)	Veterans Memorial Fieldhouse; Huntington, WV
Dec 17, 1955		at Western Michigan	L 70–80	3–1 (1–1)	Oakland Gymnasium; Kalamazoo, MI
Dec 20, 1955*		at Morehead State	L 89–102	3–2	Button Hall; Morehead, KY
Dec 29, 1955*		vs. Boston College; Fayetteville Invitational	W 130–69	4–2	Fayetteville, IN
Dec 30, 1955*		vs. Denver; Fayetteville Invitational	W 79–78	5–2	Fayetteville, IN
Jan 4, 1956		Miami (OH)	W 99–93	6–2 (2–1)	Veterans Memorial Fieldhouse; Huntington, WV
Jan 7, 1956		Western Michigan	W 85–72	7–2 (3–1)	Veterans Memorial Fieldhouse; Huntington, WV
Jan 12, 1956		at Ohio	W 72–63	8–2 (4–1)	Woodruff Hall; Athens, OH
Jan 14, 1956		Toledo	W 92–53	9–2 (5–1)	Veterans Memorial Fieldhouse; Huntington, WV
Jan 18, 1956*		Morris Harvey	W 115–76	10–2	Veterans Memorial Fieldhouse; Huntington, WV
Jan 20, 1956*		at Baldwin Wallace	W 91–87	11–2	Berea, OH
Jan 21, 1956		at Kent State	W 97–83	12–2 (6–1)	Men's Physical Education Building; Kent, OH
Jan 28, 1956		Kent State	W 110–108	13–2 (7–1)	Veterans Memorial Fieldhouse; Huntington, WV
Feb 2, 1956*	No. 18	Morehead State	L 103–108	13–3	Veterans Memorial Fieldhouse; Huntington, WV
Feb 7, 1956*		West Virginia Wesleyan	W 85–64	14–3	Veterans Memorial Fieldhouse; Huntington, WV
Feb 10, 1956		at Bowling Green	W 87–85	15–3 (8–1)	Bowling Green, OH
Feb 11, 1956		at Toledo	W 78–70	16–3 (9–1)	The Field House; Toledo, OH
Feb 20, 1956		Bowling Green	W 95–91	17–3 (10–1)	Veterans Memorial Fieldhouse; Huntington, WV
Feb 22, 1956		at Miami (OH)	L 82–103	17–4 (10–2)	Withrow Court; Oxford, OH
Feb 25, 1956*		at Morris Harvey	W 109–91	18–4	Charleston, WV
NCAA tournament
Mar 12, 1956*		vs. Morehead State; First Round – Midwest Region	L 92–107	18–5	Allen County War Memorial Coliseum; Fort Wayne, IN
*Non-conference game. ^{#}Rankings from AP Poll. (#) Tournament seedings in parentheses.
