= Sun Devil Gym =

Multi-purpose arena at ASU in Tempe, Arizona

- Sun Devil Gym
- Interactive map of Sun Devil Gym
- Full name: Sun Devil Gym
- Location: 451 E Orange St; Tempe, AZ
- Coordinates: 33°25′5″N 111°56′0″W
- Owner: Arizona State University
- Operator: Arizona State University
- Capacity: 4,609

Construction
- Opened: December 15, 1953
- Cost: $1 million

Sun Devil Gym is a 4,609-seat multi-purpose arena in Tempe, Arizona. It was home to the Arizona State University Sun Devils basketball team from 1953 until the Desert Financial Arena opened in 1974. The building is now known as Physical Education West and is used mostly for classrooms and events.

Prior to its opening, the basketball team played at either College Gym (cap. 1,500) on the Tempe campus or at the Mesa Civic Center, which was destroyed by fire in 1959.
