= 1955–56 Atlantic Coast Conference men's basketball season =

== Final standings ==
Team	ACC Regular Season	Regular season %	All Games	All Games %	Nonconference Games	Ranked AP All	Ranked AP Nonconference
NC State	11–3	.786	24–4	.857			
North Carolina	11–3	.786	18–5	.783			
Wake Forest	10–4	.714	19–9	.679			
Duke	10–4	.714	19–7	.731			
Maryland	7–7	.500	14–10	.583			
Virginia	3–11	.214	10–17	.370			
South Carolina	3–11	.214	9–14	.391			
Clemson	1–13	.071	9–17	.346			
Total			124–86	.590			

== ACC tournament ==
See 1956 ACC men's basketball tournament

== NCAA tournament ==
=== Round of 25 ===
Canisius 79, NC State 78 (4 OT)

== NIT ==
League rules prevented ACC teams from playing in the NIT, 1954–1966
